= The Mandalorian season 3 =

The Mandalorian
- Season 3
- Promotional poster
- Showrunner: Jon Favreau
- Starring: Pedro Pascal; Katee Sackhoff
- No. of episodes: 8

Release
- Original network: Disney+
- Original release: March 1 – April 19, 2023

Season chronology
- ← Previous; Season 2

The third season of the American television series The Mandalorian is part of the Star Wars franchise, set after the events of the film Return of the Jedi (1983). It continues the story of a bounty hunter and his charge, Grogu, after they were reunited in the spin-off series The Book of Boba Fett. It also depicts efforts to unite the scattered Mandalorian people and retake their home planet from remnants of the Empire. The season was produced by Lucasfilm, Fairview Entertainment, and Golem Creations, with Jon Favreau serving as showrunner.

Pedro Pascal and Katee Sackhoff star as the title character and Mandalorian leader Bo-Katan Kryze, respectively. Development on a third season of The Mandalorian began by late April 2020, and it was officially confirmed that December. The season concludes storylines from the first two seasons as well as The Book of Boba Fett, and teases new stories for future projects. Filming began by October 2021 and wrapped in late March 2022. Joseph Shirley took over as composer from Ludwig Göransson.

The eight-episode season premiered on the streaming service Disney+ on March 1, 2023, and ran until April 19, 2023. It received generally positive reviews from critics, with praise for the performances, musical score, direction, cinematography, and action sequences, but criticism for the writing and pacing, with some deeming the season weaker than its predecessors. The season won a Primetime Creative Arts Emmy Award and was nominated for eight others. A fourth season entered development, before Lucasfilm re-evaluated their plans for the franchise and instead announced a continuation film, The Mandalorian and Grogu (2026), in January 2024.

== Episodes ==
No. overall	No. in season	Title	Directed by	Written by	Original release date
17	1	"Chapter 17: The Apostate"	Rick Famuyiwa	Jon Favreau	March 1, 2023
The Armorer and a group of Mandalorians hold a ceremony to induct a young child, Ragnar Vizsla, into the tribe. The ceremony is interrupted when a Dinosaur Turtle attacks the Mandalorians. The clan initially fails to defend themselves, but they are saved by Din Djarin and Grogu, who have been reunited. (Note: As depicted in The Book of Boba Fett episode "Chapter 7: In the Name of Honor" (2022).) The Armorer confirms that if the mines of Mandalore still exist, Djarin may become a Mandalorian once more. Djarin travels to Nevarro to meet High Magistrate Greef Karga. Djarin helps Karga stave off a group of pirates, led by the pirate Vane. Karga offers Djarin the position of marshal, but Djarin refuses, stating that he came to rebuild IG-11. Djarin successfully revives IG-11, but the droid defaults to his original, violent programming. Djarin brings the parts to a group of Anzellan mechanics, who tell him that they need a new memory core to repair the droid. As Djarin leaves Nevarro, the pirate crew led by Vane's superior, Gorian Shard, attacks his ship, but Djarin escapes. Djarin meets with Bo-Katan Kryze in an old Mandalorian castle on Kalevala, who reveals that after losing the Darksaber, she has abandoned her plans to reclaim Mandalore and tells Djarin to travel there alone.
18	2	"Chapter 18: The Mines of Mandalore"	Rachel Morrison	Jon Favreau	March 8, 2023
Djarin visits Peli Motto on Tatooine in search of a new memory chip for IG-11. She does not have one, but instead sells him R5-D4. Djarin, Grogu and R5 fly to Mandalore, where Djarin orders R5 to scout ahead and ensure that the atmosphere is non-toxic. When R5 does not return, Djarin ventures after it and is attacked by several Alamites, a native troll-like species living in the caves. Heading deeper into the mines, Djarin is captured by a cyborg creature and sends Grogu for Bo-Katan's help. Bo-Katan rescues Djarin and kills the cyborg before leading Djarin to the Living Waters. Djarin immerses himself to restore his status as a Mandalorian, but a sudden drop off causes him to sink deep into the water. Bo-Katan dives in to save him. On the way back up, she comes face to face with a Mythosaur.
19	3	"Chapter 19: The Convert"	Lee Isaac Chung	Noah Kloor & Jon Favreau	March 15, 2023
After Djarin recovers, he and Bo-Katan depart Mandalore, though Bo-Katan withholds the Mythosaur's existence from him. Upon returning to Kalevala, they are attacked by Imperial TIE squads, who destroy Bo-Katan's home, and are forced to retreat. On Coruscant, Dr. Pershing receives a pardon by the New Republic, but is startled to find Elia Kane—a former communications officer who was a part of Moff Gideon's Imperial remnant—among the amnesty program's recipients. Kane agrees to assist Pershing in his efforts to continue his cloning research, which has been outlawed by the Republic. They sneak aboard a decommissioned Imperial-class Star Destroyer to steal the necessary materials, but Kane betrays Pershing to the Republic's lawkeepers and later secretly sabotages the mind-wiping procedure used on him. Meanwhile, Djarin and Bo-Katan arrive at the secret Mandalorian enclave, where Djarin presents the Armorer with a sample of the Living Waters as proof of his redemption. Because she has also bathed in the Waters, Bo-Katan is welcomed to the enclave as well.
20	4	"Chapter 20: The Foundling"	Carl Weathers	Jon Favreau & Dave Filoni	March 22, 2023
Djarin introduces Grogu to Mandalorian combat training. Grogu wins a training match, but his opponent Ragnar Vizsla is captured by a large raptor. Bo-Katan gathers a hunting party, which includes Djarin and Ragnar's father Paz Vizsla, and leads them to the raptor's nest on foot. The Armorer forges a new piece of Mandalorian armor for Grogu, a rondel bearing Djarin's mudhorn sigil. As she works, Grogu has visions of his rescue from the burning Jedi Temple by Jedi Master Kelleran Beq and sympathetic members of the Naboo Armed Forces. (Note: Set during the events of Star Wars: Episode III – Revenge of the Sith (2005).) Vizsla's over-eagerness to save Ragnar disrupts Bo-Katan's plan and leads to a difficult aerial confrontation in which Bo-Katan and Djarin rescue the boy unharmed, kill the raptor, collect its chicks, and earn the clan's respect. As the Armorer replaces Bo-Katan's pauldron, lost in the scuffle with the raptor, Bo-Katan reveals her encounter with the Mythosaur, but the Armorer meets her account with indifferent disbelief.
21	5	"Chapter 21: The Pirate"	Peter Ramsey	Jon Favreau	March 29, 2023
In retaliation for Vane's expulsion, Gorian Shard invades Nevarro. Greef Karga contacts Carson Teva for help from the New Republic. Suspecting that the attack is a prelude to a new rise of the Empire, Teva informs Colonel Tuttle, but when Tuttle shows indifference, he tracks down the Mandalorian covert and asks Din Djarin for help. Djarin convinces the covert to come to Karga's aid despite their prior confrontations with him, and Bo-Katan assumes command of the attack force. As the Mandalorians overcome the invasion, Vane flees, Shard is killed, and the remaining pirates are detained. The Mandalorians are welcomed back by Karga and the people, and move back into their old enclave. The Armorer meets with Bo-Katan, acknowledging the Mythosaur's reappearance as an omen that Bo-Katan is the one who can reunite all Mandalorians, and bids her to remove her helmet to symbolize this new position. On his way back to Adelphi, Teva encounters the wreckage of Moff Gideon's prison transport, which had gone missing during transit, and finds a fragment of beskar alloy inside.
22	6	"Chapter 22: Guns for Hire"	Bryce Dallas Howard	Jon Favreau	April 5, 2023
Bo-Katan, Djarin and Grogu set out for the idyllic planet Plazir-15, where Bo-Katan's former army, now led by Axe Woves, have set themselves up as mercenaries. Before they can meet them, they are involuntarily diverted by the planet's rulers, Captain Bombardier and the Duchess, who ask for their help in neutralizing several repurposed but malfunctioning Imperial and Separatist droids. After stopping a rogue droid, Bo-Katan and Djarin follow its trail to The Resistor, a droid bar, and convince its bartender and clientele to help them. They discover that the droids were sabotaged through nanodroids in the bar's maintenance fluid, which were covertly imported by Commissioner Helgait, head of the planetary Security Office. Confronted, Helgait reveals himself as a Separatist before Bo-Katan knocks him out, and the Duchess sentences him to a penitent exile on the Moon of Paraquaat. Granted an audience with the Mandalorian privateers, Bo-Katan challenges Woves for leadership and defeats him. To help her ascendance, Djarin admits his capture by the cyborg in the mines of Mandalore and his rescue by Bo-Katan, which rightfully bestows the Darksaber back to her.
23	7	"Chapter 23: The Spies"	Rick Famuyiwa	Jon Favreau & Dave Filoni	April 12, 2023
Moff Gideon is informed by Elia Kane of the Mandalorians' intent to retake their planet. Gideon relays this information to the Shadow Council, a group of Imperial remnant warlords. He requests reinforcements from Commandant Brendol Hux and questions Captain Pellaeon on the absence of Grand Admiral Thrawn. Reassembling on Nevarro, Bo-Katan unites the Mandalorian clans and prepares a recon party to explore the surface of Mandalore and locate the Great Forge. Before leaving, Greef Karga presents Din Djarin with IG-12: a rebuilt version of IG-11, which is able to be controlled by Grogu. On Mandalore, the group meets another surviving clan, who is loyal to Bo-Katan. Bo-Katan admits that she surrendered to Gideon shortly after the Night of a Thousand Tears, hoping that her people would be spared from further harm. The party finds the Great Forge but is ambushed by beskar-enhanced stormtroopers. Djarin is captured by a beskar-clad Gideon, who reveals his intent to complete the Great Purge of Mandalore. He attempts to kill the search party, but Bo-Katan uses the Darksaber to make an escape for the group. Paz Vizsla stays behind to buy time, but is killed by Gideon's Praetorian Guards.
24	8	"Chapter 24: The Return"	Rick Famuyiwa	Jon Favreau	April 19, 2023
Bo-Katan and her reconnaissance squad retreat from Moff Gideon's base. Upon returning to the Mandalorian flagship, Axe Woves sends the remaining Mandalorians to reinforce the planetary troops, while he defends the ship from Imperial TIE squadrons. With assistance from Grogu, Din Djarin escapes from captivity and seeks out Gideon. Djarin and Grogu discover cloning tanks filled with Force-sensitive clones of Gideon, and Djarin destroys them. After a lengthy skirmish between the Mandalorians and the beskar-enhanced stormtroopers within the base, Bo-Katan, Djarin, and Grogu make a final stand against Gideon and his Praetorian Guards, in which the Darksaber is destroyed. Woves rams the Mandalorian capital ship into the Imperial base and Gideon is consumed by the resulting blast; Grogu protects himself, Bo-Katan and Djarin from the blast with a Force barrier. After the battle, the Mandalorians restart the Great Forge and Djarin formally adopts Grogu. Afterwards, Djarin takes up honest contract work with Carson Teva and moves into a cabin on the outskirts of Nevarro's capital, while IG-11 is rebuilt by the Anzellan mechanics to serve as Nevarro's new marshal.

== Cast and characters ==
=== Starring ===
- Pedro Pascal as Din Djarin / The Mandalorian
  - Brendan Wayne and Lateef Crowder as the on-set doubles for the Mandalorian
- Katee Sackhoff as Bo-Katan Kryze
- Grogu

=== Recurring co-stars ===
- Emily Swallow as The Armorer
- Carl Weathers as Greef Karga
- Katy M. O'Brian as Elia Kane
- Paul Sun-Hyung Lee as Carson Teva
- Simon Kassianides as Axe Woves
- Mercedes Varnado as Koska Reeves
- Tait Fletcher as Paz Vizsla (Note: Voiced by Jon Favreau (uncredited).)
- Giancarlo Esposito as Moff Gideon

=== Other co-stars ===
- Amy Sedaris as Peli Motto
- Omid Abtahi as Penn Pershing
- Ahmed Best as Kelleran Beq
- Tim Meadows as Colonel Tuttle
- Jack Black as Captain Bombardier
- Lizzo as Duchess of Plazir-15
- Christopher Lloyd as Commander Helgait

== Production ==
=== Development ===
By late April 2020, The Mandalorian creator and showrunner Jon Favreau had been writing a third season for "a while" and further development on the season was beginning. That September, co-star Giancarlo Esposito said the second season would "start to lay the groundwork for the depth and breadth that's going to come in season 3 and season 4, where you're really gonna start to get answers." After the second-season finale announced The Book of Boba Fett for December 2021, commentators speculated that the third season would be shifting focus from Din Djarin, The Mandalorian, to Boba Fett. Favreau soon clarified that The Book of Boba Fett was a separate spin-off series that was already in production in December 2020, with the third season of The Mandalorian again focusing on Djarin. He added that the third season was in pre-production, and filming would begin in 2021. Bryce Dallas Howard, Rick Famuyiwa, and co-star Carl Weathers all directed episodes after doing so for previous seasons, with Famuyiwa also being promoted to executive producer. Lee Isaac Chung, Peter Ramsey, and Rachel Morrison all directed episodes of the season.

=== Writing ===
Favreau wrote all eight episodes of the season, working with Noah Kloor on the third and Dave Filoni on the fourth and seventh episodes. The season picks up after the events of The Book of Boba Fett (2021), with the Mandalorian and Grogu traveling to Mandalore so Din Djarin can redeem himself for his transgressions of removing his helmet. Discussing the absence of Cara Dune in the season following the firing of actress Gina Carano, Famuyiwa said the character was still "a big part... of the world" and that Favreau took the time to address her absence. However, the creatives knew "the heart of the show" was Din Djarin and Grogu with Filoni stating the season was "mainly dealing with Mandalorians and the Mandalorian saga, the Mandalorian tale", and how that affects the duo's story. Famuyiwa stated the season would resolve a number of plot points established in the previous Mandalorian seasons as well as in the spin-off series The Book of Boba Fett, particularly in the final two episodes, concluding the first chapter of these connected stories. The season would also plant seeds as to where the connected storyline was heading.

=== Casting ===
Pedro Pascal stars in the series as The Mandalorian. The Mandalorian is also portrayed by stunt doubles Brendan Wayne and Lateef Crowder, with Wayne and Crowder receiving co-star credit for the first time in the third season. In November 2020, Esposito said he expected to be featured more prominently in the third season than previous ones. Also returning are Carl Weathers as Greef Karga, Katee Sackhoff as Bo-Katan Kryze, Emily Swallow as The Armorer, Amy Sedaris as Peli Motto, Omid Abtahi as Penn Pershing, Simon Kassianides as Axe Woves, and Mercedes Varnado as Koska Reeves. Katy O'Brian co-stars as Elia Kane, reprising the role from the second season, while Ahmed Best co-stars as Jedi Master Kelleran Beq; Best originated the role on the children's game show Star Wars: Jedi Temple Challenge. Due to the previous experience and concern to how his character would fit in the story, Best was initially reluctant to appear. However, executive producers Jon Favreau and Dave Filoni were able to convince him to appear. Paul Sun-Hyung Lee also reprises his role as Carson Teva, as does Tait Fletcher as the Mandalorian Paz Vizsla, with the character voiced by Favreau. In March 2022, Christopher Lloyd was revealed to be a guest star for the season, as Commissioner Helgait, and in May 2022 it was revealed that Tim Meadows would appear in the season, as New Republic Colonel Tuttle. Jack Black and singer Lizzo co-star as Captain Bombardier and his wife The Duchess, respectively, of the planet Plazir-15. Favreau cast Black and Lizzo as Bombardier and the Duchess because of their reputations in social media as Star Wars fans, with Black often doing funny videos of The Mandalorian on his Instagram and TikTok accounts while Lizzo often cosplayed as Grogu in videos that Favreau's kids showed to his father. As the showrunners were preparing to make an episode with an eccentric royal couple in a court that felt like something taken from Lewis Carroll's Alice's Adventures in Wonderland, Favreau reached out to Black and Lizzo and they gladly accepted, especially for the opportunity of interacting with the Grogu puppet.

Also starring in the season are Temuera Morrison reprising his role as the voice of the clone troopers, Steve Blum reprising his role as the voice of Rebels character Garazeb "Zeb" Orrelios, and directors Deborah Chow, Rick Famuyiwa, and Dave Filoni reprising their roles as New Republic pilots Sash Ketter, Jib Dodger, and Trapper Wolf, respectively. Brian Gleeson and Xander Berkeley appear as Brendol Hux and Gillad Pellaeon, two Imperial warlords and members of the Shadow Council. Jonny Coyne, Jodi Long, Hemky Madera, Ron Bottitta, Marco Khan, and Imelda Corcoran appear as additional warlords.

=== Filming ===
Filming for the season began by October 13, 2021, with David Klein serving as the cinematographer. It had previously been expected to begin once filming for The Book of Boba Fett completed in June 2021, but was unable to then because Obi-Wan Kenobi was using the Los Angeles soundstages. Esposito noted that the production did not need to wait for Pascal to complete filming the HBO series The Last of Us since the Mandalorian is primarily seen with his helmet on. Regarding filming the season during the COVID-19 pandemic, Favreau felt The Mandalorian was in an advantageous situation since many characters are in masks and the series employs "a lot of digital work that augments things", allowing the production to be flexible to adhere to filming protocols. Filming wrapped on March 29, 2022. Reshoots occurred in early July 2022.

=== Music ===
In February 2023, Joseph Shirley was revealed to be composing the score for the season, replacing Ludwig Göransson. Shirley previously provided additional music for the first two seasons and used Göransson's themes to compose the score for The Book of Boba Fett. Like the previous season, its music was released into two volumes. The first volume featuring selections from "Chapter 17" to "Chapter 20" of the season was released digitally by Walt Disney Records on March 29, 2023, while the second, featuring selections from "Chapter 21" to "Chapter 24" was released on April 21, 2023.

The Mandalorian: Season 3 – Vol. 1 (Chapters 17–20) [Original Score]
No.	Title	Length
1.	"The Living Waters"	3:27
2.	"The Apostate"	1:58
3.	"High Magistrate"	3:41
4.	"We Got Pirates"	3:24
5.	"A Castle"	3:34
6.	"Back for a Tune Up"	2:12
7.	"Mando's in Trouble"	4:35
8.	"The Old Mines"	3:02
9.	"I Swear on My Name"	2:31
10.	"Attack on the Gauntlet"	5:27
11.	"Amnesty Scientist"	4:05
12.	"Coruscant Street Fair"	3:33
13.	"Worth the Risk"	2:02
14.	"L52"	3:26
15.	"You Are One of Us"	3:55
16.	"Playtime's Over"	3:58
17.	"There Are No Others"	5:39
18.	"Quest for a Foundling"	5:09
19.	"Double Signet"	1:44
Total length:		67:00

The Mandalorian: Season 3 – Vol. 2 (Chapters 21–24) [Original Score]
No.	Title	Length
1.	"Adelphi Jukebox"	1:47
2.	"Imperial Thinking"	3:12
3.	"Siege on Navarro"	5:45
4.	"Open Fire Below"	2:24
5.	"Walk the Way Together"	2:04
6.	"All's Fair in Love and War"	3:37
7.	"Plazir Royal Hall" (feat. Sasha Flute)	3:05
8.	"Battle Droids"	1:39
9.	"A Challenge"	4:15
10.	"Welcomed Guests"	3:21
11.	"Langskib"	2:40
12.	"The Great Forge"	8:12
13.	"Sleeping Beauties"	3:30
14.	"Let's Take Back Our Planet"	4:22
15.	"Stronger Together"	5:01
16.	"Forever Forged in My Heart"	7:28
Total length:		62:00

== Marketing ==
Filoni, Favreau, and Sackhoff promoted the season at Lucasfilm's Star Wars Celebration panel on May 26, 2022, revealing the first teaser to those in attendance. They returned for a panel on The Mandalorian and The Book of Boba Fett on May 28 along with Pascal, Esposito, and Weathers, where more footage from the season was shown. Filoni, Favreau, and cast members promoted the season at the 2022 D23 Expo, while also debuting a trailer. A second trailer for the season was released on January 16, 2023, during Monday Night Football. The trailer had 83.5 million global views in its first 24 hours, becoming the most viewed trailer in that time period for a Star Wars Disney+ series; surpassing Obi-Wan Kenobi (58 million views).

== Release ==
The season premiered on March 1, 2023 on Disney+, and consists of eight episodes.

== Reception ==
=== Audience viewership ===
According to Samba TV the first episode was the number one streamed show that week and watched by 1.6 million households over the first five days. According to Parrot Analytics, which looks at consumer engagement in consumer research, streaming, downloads, and on social media, The Mandalorian was the most in-demand streaming original series in the United States during the week of 25 February to 3 March 2023, and during the week of 4 March to 10 March 2023.

According to Whip Media's TV Time, The Mandalorian was the most streamed television series across all platforms in the United States during the week of March 5, 2023, during the week of March 12, 2023, during the week of March 19, 2023, during the week of March 26, 2023, during the week of April 2, 2023, during the week of April 9, 2023, during the week of April 16, 2023, and during the week of April 23, 2023. Whip Media later announced The Mandalorian was the most-watched streaming original television series of 2023.

=== Critical response ===
The Mandalorian season 3: Critical reception by episode
Season 3 (2023): Percentage of positive critics' reviews tracked by the website Rotten Tomatoes

The review aggregator website Rotten Tomatoes reported an 84% approval rating with an average score of 7.55/10 based on 248 reviews. The site's critical consensus reads: "Mileage may vary by a couple parsecs as The Mandalorian becomes more and more about the connective tissue of broader Star Wars lore, but this remains one of the most engaging adventures in a galaxy far, far away." Metacritic, which uses a weighted average, assigned a score of 70 out of 100 based on 14 critics, indicating "generally favorable" reviews.

=== Accolades ===
Year	Award	Category	Nominee(s)	Result	Ref.
2023	Black Reel Awards	Outstanding Guest Actor, Drama Series	Giancarlo Esposito	Nominated	
2023	Hollywood Critics Association Creative Arts TV Awards	Best Guest Actor in a Drama Series	Giancarlo Esposito	Nominated	
2023	Hollywood Critics Association Creative Arts TV Awards	Best Guest Actress in a Drama Series	Lizzo	Nominated	
2023	Hollywood Critics Association Creative Arts TV Awards	Best Fantasy or Science Fiction Costumes	The Mandalorian	Nominated	
2023	Hollywood Critics Association Creative Arts TV Awards	Best Stunts	The Mandalorian	Nominated	
2023	Hollywood Critics Association TV Awards	Best Streaming Series, Drama	The Mandalorian	Nominated	
2023	Hollywood Critics Association TV Awards	Best Supporting Actress in a Streaming Series, Drama	Emily Swallow	Nominated	
2023	Hollywood Critics Association TV Awards	Best Directing in a Streaming Series, Drama	Lee Isaac Chung (for "Chapter 19: The Convert")	Nominated	
2023	Primetime Creative Arts Emmy Awards	Outstanding Cinematography for a Series (Half-Hour)	Dean Cundey (for "Chapter 20: The Foundling")	Nominated	
2023	Primetime Creative Arts Emmy Awards	Outstanding Fantasy/Sci-Fi Costumes	Shawna Trpcic, Elissa Alcala, Julie Robar, and Julie Yang Silver (for "Chapter 22: Guns for Hire")	Nominated	
2023	Primetime Creative Arts Emmy Awards	Outstanding Period and/or Character Hairstyling	Maria Sandoval, Ashleigh Childers, and Sallie Ciganovich (for "Chapter 19: The Convert")	Nominated	
2023	Primetime Creative Arts Emmy Awards	Outstanding Period and/or Character Makeup (Non-Prosthetic)	Cristina Waltz, Ana Gabriela Quinonez Urrego, Alex Perrone, and Crystal Gomez (for "Chapter 22: Guns for Hire")	Nominated	
2023	Primetime Creative Arts Emmy Awards	Outstanding Sound Editing for a Comedy or Drama Series (Half-Hour) and Animation	Matthew Wood, Trey Turner, Brad Semenoff, David W. Collins, Luis Galdames, Stephanie McNally, Nicholas Fitzgerald, Joel Raabe, and Shelley Roden (for "Chapter 24: The Return")	Nominated	
2023	Primetime Creative Arts Emmy Awards	Outstanding Sound Mixing for a Comedy or Drama Series (Half-Hour) and Animation	Scott R. Lewis, Tony Villaflor, Shawn Holden, and Chris Fogel (for "Chapter 24: The Return")	Nominated	
2023	Primetime Creative Arts Emmy Awards	Outstanding Special Visual Effects in a Season or a Movie	Grady Cofer, Abbigail Keller, Paul Kavanagh, Cameron Neilson, Scott Fisher, Hal Hickel, J. Alan Scott, Victor Schutz IV, and Bobo Skipper	Nominated	
2023	Primetime Creative Arts Emmy Awards	Outstanding Stunt Coordination for a Drama Series, Limited or Anthology Series or Movie	JJ Dashnaw	Nominated	
2023	Primetime Creative Arts Emmy Awards	Outstanding Stunt Performance	Lateef Crowder, Paul Darnell, JJ Dashnaw, and Ryan Ryusaki (for "Chapter 24: The Return")	Won	
