= Paz Vizsla =

Star Wars character

- Star Wars character
- Paz Vizsla in The Book of Boba Fett
- First appearance: "Chapter 3: The Sin"; The Mandalorian; (2019)
- Last appearance: "Chapter 23: The Spies"; The Mandalorian; (2023)
- Created by: Jon Favreau
- Voiced by: Jon Favreau
- Portrayed by: Tait Fletcher

In-universe information
- Species: Human
- Gender: Male
- Title: Heavy Infantry Mandalorian
- Affiliation: Children of the Watch; House Vizsla
- Children: Ragnar Vizsla (son)
- Relatives: Tarre Vizsla (ancestor); Pre Vizsla
- Homeworld: Mandalore

Paz Vizsla is a fictional character in the Star Wars franchise. He first appeared in the first season of the Disney+ television series The Mandalorian as a member of the same tribe of Mandalorian warriors in service of the Armorer as the titular character, with whom Vizsla initially clashes with but later assists in repelling a remnant of the Galactic Empire. The two had another altercation in the spin-off series The Book of Boba Fett over ownership of the Darksaber, a legendary lightsaber forged by Paz's ancestor, Tarre Vizsla. He then returned in the third season of The Mandalorian, in which he dies protecting Bo-Katan Kryze.

Encased in physically imposing Beskar armor, Paz Vizsla is a heavy infantry warrior who uses a large, minigun-like blaster as well as a jet pack. Physically portrayed by Tait Fletcher, a stunt performer and former mixed martial artist, the character was voiced by Jon Favreau, the creator and showrunner of The Mandalorian; Favreau previously voiced Pre Vizsla, another member of House Vizsla, in the animated television series Star Wars: The Clone Wars. In-universe, Vizsla is the name of one of the largest Mandalorian clans.

Paz Vizsla has received a positive response from fans and reviewers. Action figures and other merchandise of the character have been produced and sold. The character's name was initially misspelled as Paz Vizla onscreen and in marketing materials for the first season of The Mandalorian, before being corrected for the character's reappearance in The Book of Boba Fett.

== Appearances ==
Paz Vizsla is a member of The Children of the Watch, a secret enclave of Mandalorian warriors on the planet Nevarro led by the Armorer, during the events of the first season of The Mandalorian. The Mandalorians are in hiding after having suffered persecution by the Galactic Empire, and although the Empire has fallen out of power by this time, the tribe has not yet regained its former status. Vizsla is a heavy infantry warrior who uses a large, minigun-like blaster as well as a jet pack. He appears in the episode "Chapter 3: The Sin". When the show's title character, a bounty hunter named Din Djarin, brings Beskar steel to the Armorer for her to forge him new armor, Vizsla observes that the steel was provided by a remnant of the Empire. Vizsla criticises Djarin for collaborating with Imperials, and the two have a brief knife fight which is broken up by the Armorer. Later in the episode, when Djarin is attacked by multiple bounty hunters after he rescued an alien child from an Imperial remnant, Vizsla and multiple Mandalorian warriors surface to assist him. As a result of revealing their presence, the Mandalorian tribe is later destroyed by the Imperials, though the Armorer notes that some of them managed to escape off-world. A pile of helmets belonging to the slain warriors is shown in the season finale "Chapter 8: Redemption", and fans noted that Vizsla's helmet was not among them, suggesting his possible survival.

Paz Vizsla's survival is confirmed in the episode "Chapter 5: Return of the Mandalorian" of the spin-off series The Book of Boba Fett, where he and the Armorer have relocated to a new enclave beneath the massive space station city of Glavis. Djarin reunites with them at the new covert and presents the Darksaber, an ancient Mandalorian lightsaber that gives its wielder the right to claim rule over Mandalore, that he won in combat against Moff Gideon. Vizsla declares the Darksaber his birthright as it had been crafted by his ancestor, the Mandalorian Jedi Tarre Vizsla, and challenges Djarin to a duel. Although Paz loses, he denounces Djarin as an apostate upon learning that he previously broke the Mandalorian Creed by removing his helmet. Vizsla orders him to leave, which the Armorer upholds, but allows Djarin take the Darksaber with him.

Vizsla returns in the third season The Mandalorian episode "Chapter 17: The Apostate", attending the initiation of his son Ragnar as a Mandalorian on a new covert planet where their enclave has moved. In "Chapter 19: The Convert", he witnesses the induction of Bo-Katan Kryze into his enclave and Din Djarin's redemption for breaking the Creed. In "Chapter 20: The Foundling", Paz is overseeing the training of young initiates when Ragnar is kidnapped by a pterodactyl-like creature. Paz and Djarin pursue the beast on their jetpacks only to run out of fuel. Bo-Katan is able to track the creature and rouses a rescue party, which Paz joins and consents the role of squad leader to her. Paz gets captured by the creature at her nest but is rescued by Kryze while Djarin rescues Ragnar. In "Chapter 23: The Spies", both the Nite Owls and the Children of the Watch tribes unite in order to reclaim Mandalore, requiring them to travel to the Great Forge alongside survivors from the planet's purge. However, the war party is ambushed by Moff Gideon's forces and subsequently trapped. In order to allow the others to escape, Paz remains to hold off their ambushers, where he is ultimately killed by Praetorian Guards.

== Characterization ==
Paz Vizsla is physically imposing, displaying great height and tremendous strength. Tough and aggressive, he is good in a fight, as seen by his efficiency in attacking and repelling multiple bounty hunters during the climactic scene in "Chapter 3: The Sin". Vizsla has a confident personality and is more outspoken than most of the other Mandalorians in his tribe; Scott Snowden of Space.com called him "the alpha-Mandalorian in the room". He despises the Galactic Empire due to its persecution of the Mandalorian people. His hatred for the Empire runs so deep that he opposes any collaboration or association with them whatsoever. This distinguishes him from the show's title character, who reluctantly accepts a bounty hunting assignment from Imperials, a decision that ultimately leads to a brief physical skirmish between him and Vizsla.

However, Vizsla has a respect for both his tribe and Mandalorian culture that supersedes his feelings of distaste toward the Empire. He willingly steps down from his confrontation with Din Djarin when the tribe's leader, the Armorer, reminds them of the moral code and way of the Mandalorian people. Despite their differences, Vizsla and Djarin display a mutual respect for each other. This is demonstrated when Vizsla places his own safety and that of his tribe at risk to help Djarin at the end of "Chapter 3: The Sin". When Djarin notes that this would place the sanctuary of the tribe's enclave at risk, Vizsla responds with the clan's credo, "This is the Way". Snowden called this "a genuine lump-in-the-throat moment as the Mandalorian's comrades have sacrificed everything to help the bounty hunter do the right thing". Din Djarin later returns the favor in "Chapter 20: The Foundling", in which he helps Vizsla rescue his son from a flying creature.

== Portrayal ==
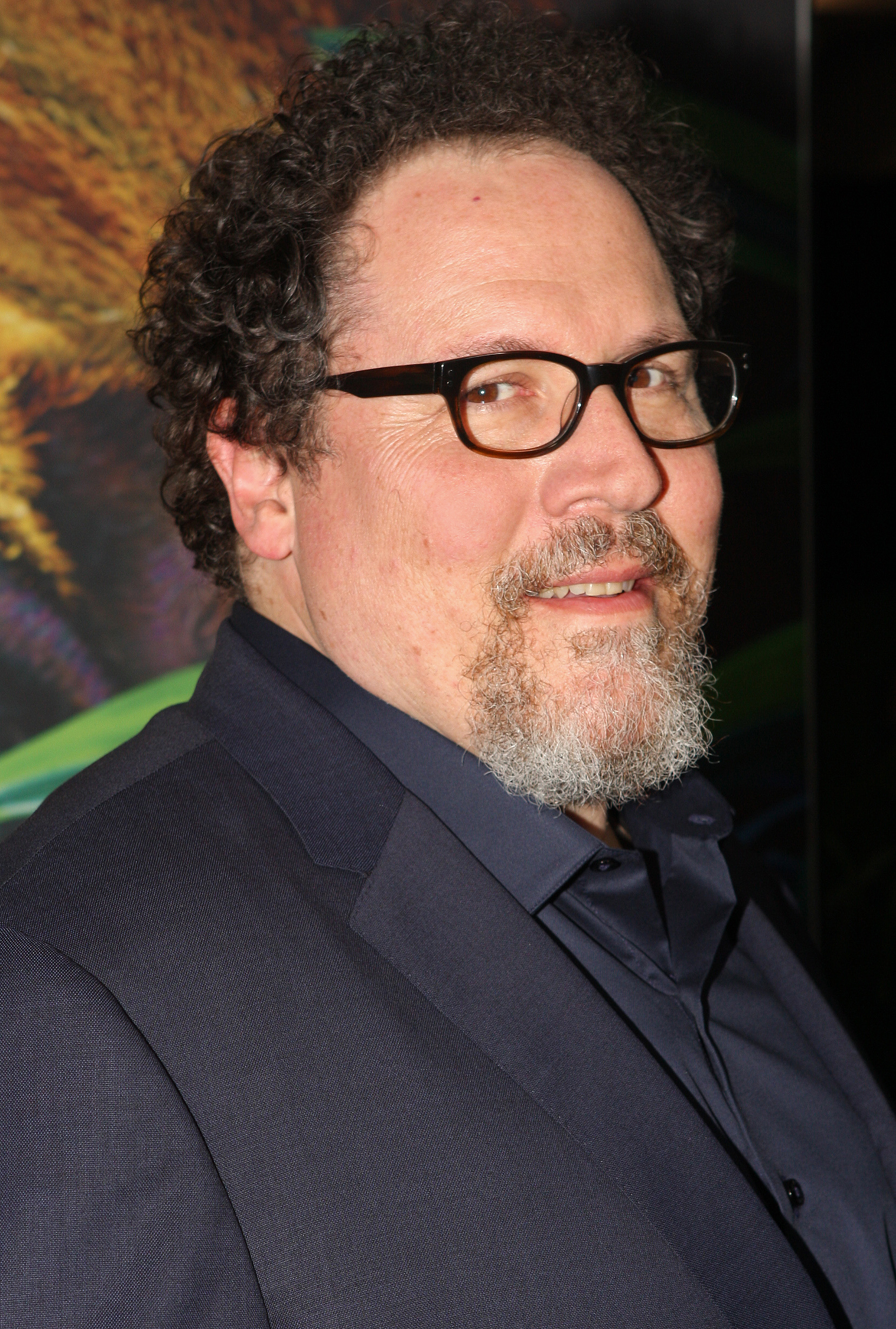
Paz Vizsla was originally voiced by Jon Favreau, the creator and showrunner of The Mandalorian.

For The Mandalorian's first and third seasons and in The Book of Boba Fett, Paz Vizsla was voiced by Jon Favreau, the show's creator and showrunner. Favreau previously voiced another member of House Vizsla, the Mandalorian warlord Pre Vizsla, in the animated television series Star Wars: The Clone Wars. In-universe, Vizsla is the name of one of the largest Mandalorian clans.

Paz Vizsla is physically portrayed by Tait Fletcher, a stunt performer and former mixed martial artist, whose face remains concealed by Vizsla's helmet. Fletcher also appeared in the series premiere "Chapter 1: The Mandalorian", in which he played an unnamed man who gets into a bar fight with the Mandalorian. That was the role that Fletcher initially accepted when he joined The Mandalorian, and was not aware he would also be playing Paz Vizsla until later. He described Vizsla as "a galvanizing character that really exposes the ferocity and dignity with which we hold the Code of the Mandalorians."

Despite never being referred to by name in "Chapter 3: The Sin", the character was identified as "Paz Vizla" in the closing credits. He was subsequently renamed "Paz Vizsla" (the previous surname confirmed as a typo) in merchandise and for his reappearance in The Book of Boba Fett.

== Critical reception ==
Paz Vizsla has received a positive response from fans and reviewers. Inverse writer Jake Kleinman called him a "fan-favorite character" who "made a big splash" despite his relatively brief screen time, particularly describing his salute to the Mandalorian as an "iconic" moment. Bayani Miguel Acebedo of Epicstream described him as "undoubtedly one of the more memorable Mandos in the show". James Whitbrook of Gizmodo called him a "badass character" and "unsung hero" of the series who "looks cool as hell". Niner Times writer Noah Howell called the character "just the best", and particularly praised the scene in which Vizsla and the other Mandalorians rescue the protagonist at the end of "Chapter 3: The Sin". A headline for a /Film story by Ethan Anderton described him as an "awesome new The Mandalorian character that isn't Baby Yoda". Christopher Marc of HN Entertainment called Vizsla an "interesting new character" who he hopes to see again. Scott Snowden of Space.com said he "looks like the product of a marriage twixt Boba Fett and War Machine".

== Merchandise ==
An action figure of Paz Vizsla has been released by Hot Toys, though it is identified only as "Heavy Infantry Mandalorian". The figure is 12.5 in (32 cm) in height, taller than most Star Wars Hot Toys figurines due to the character's larger size, and includes such accessories as a minigun blaster, alternate hands, a knife, a themed base to pose him upon, and special effects pieces for his jetpack to simulate rocket blasts. Additionally, a Funko Pop figurine of Paz Vizsla was announced on December 31, 2019. Hasbro also released a 6 in (15 cm) action figure of Paz Vizsla as part of the company's Star Wars: The Black Series toy line.
