= Moff Gideon =

Fictional character in the Star Wars franchise

- Star Wars character
- Giancarlo Esposito as Moff Gideon in The Mandalorian
- First appearance: "Chapter 7: The Reckoning"; The Mandalorian; December 18, 2019
- Last appearance: "Chapter 24: The Return"; The Mandalorian; April 19, 2023
- Created by: Jon Favreau
- Portrayed by: Giancarlo Esposito

In-universe information
- Species: Human
- Title(s): Moff; Heir to Mandalore (formerly)
- Occupation: Imperial Security Bureau officer (formerly); Imperial remnant commander and warlord
- Affiliation: Galactic Empire; The Client
- Weapon: The Darksaber; Preceded by: Bo-Katan Kryze (first and second wieldings); Succeeded by: The Mandalorian / Din Djarin (first wielding)
- Relatives: Gideon's Force sensitive clones ("Chapter 24: The Return")

Moff Gideon (/ˈmɒf ˈɡɪdiən/) is a fictional character in the Star Wars franchise who first appeared as the main antagonist in the Disney+ television series The Mandalorian. Gideon is the leader of a remnant of the fallen Galactic Empire and responsible for the Purge of Mandalore. He was the wielder of the Darksaber before Din Djarin and Bo-Katan Kryze. He attempts to capture the young Force sensitive child Grogu, who is being protected by the title character of the series, planning on using Grogu's blood to imbue numerous clones of himself with Force sensitivity.

Gideon is portrayed by Giancarlo Esposito. He was recruited for the part by The Mandalorian creator and showrunner Jon Favreau, who had previously worked with Esposito on several projects. Gideon is portrayed as a dangerous and fierce man who, "seems to know everything about everyone", and does not hesitate to kill anyone to get what he wants, including his men. The character did not make his first appearance until the penultimate episode of the first season but played a larger role in the second season with five episodes. He returns for the two last episodes of the third season.

Esposito has rejected simple classifications of Gideon as a "good" or "bad" character, noting that he is attempting to restore order to a lawless galaxy and could arguably be seen as a "savior for the galaxy". Gideon's all-black costume has been compared to that of Star Wars character Darth Vader, and reviewers have noted similarities in their personalities and behavior as well. Moff Gideon has been received positively by reviewers and fans. Esposito was nominated for a Primetime Emmy Award for Outstanding Guest Actor in a Drama Series for his performance in the first season, while also earning a nomination for Outstanding Supporting Actor in a Drama Series for the second.

== Appearances ==
=== Backstory ===
Few details of his backstory have been revealed. Gideon was previously an operative in the Imperial Security Bureau, a covert intelligence arm and secret police for the Galactic Empire. Before the events of The Mandalorian, Gideon played a role in the Great Purge, an oppressive combat operation against a culture known as the Mandalorians, which resulted in many of them being killed and the survivors becoming scattered across the galaxy. Gideon knows information about the show's title character, otherwise known as "The Mandalorian", including his identity, due to his role in the Purge. It is revealed in "Chapter 23: The Spies" that during the Great Purge, Bo-Katan had surrendered the Darksaber and leadership of Mandalore over to Moff Gideon to prevent the bombing of the planet's surface, but that Moff Gideon had turned on his word and ordered the destruction of the planet anyway. The term "Moff" is a title for a high-ranking Imperial official who served as a governor of a specific sector of space for the Empire. Its first use dates back to the original Star Wars (1977) film, most notably with the character Grand Moff Tarkin, though the word "Moff" is not used in that film and the character is only identified by that title in the end credits.

Gideon's life drastically changed after the fall of the Empire, and he became a warlord leading his own Imperial remnant. As the character Cara Dune states in the show, it was widely believed Gideon had been executed for war crimes before the events of the series. In The Mandalorian, Gideon is attempting to capture a young alien Grogu, also known as "The Child", to extract its blood for Dr. Pershing's secret experiments. Just prior to Gideon's first appearance on The Mandalorian, he dispatched his forces to eliminate the Mandalorian tribe on the planet Nevarro after they revealed their presence there during the episode "Chapter 3: The Sin".

=== The Mandalorian season one ===
Gideon made his first appearance in "Chapter 7: The Reckoning", the penultimate episode of the first season of The Mandalorian. He first appears when he contacts "The Client", an unnamed operative working to obtain Grogu for Gideon. The Client is meeting with the bounty hunter Greef Karga and his associate Cara Dune at a cantina on the planet Nevarro. He is under the impression that Greef has brought Grogu to him, along with the imprisoned Mandalorian, who had been trying to protect Grogu from the Empire. In reality, Grogu is not with them, and the meeting is a trap arranged by the Mandalorian and his allies to kill the Client and his stormtroopers. When Gideon contacts the Client during the meeting, the Client assures him he has Grogu in his custody. Gideon suggests that is not the case, then orders a squadron of his death troopers to open fire on the cantina, killing the Client and his troops. Afterwards, the cantina is surrounded by stormtroopers and death troopers, and Gideon lands his modified TIE fighter outside the building and emerges, informing the trapped Mandalorian, Cara, and Greef that he wants Grogu.

Gideon returns in the season finale episode, "Chapter 8: Redemption", in which he speaks to the Mandalorian and his party from outside the cantina, demanding they turn Grogu over to him. Gideon reveals he knows secret details about all of them, and refers to the Mandalorian by his real name, Din Djarin, marking the first time this name was revealed in the show. When the droid IG-11 arrives to assist the Mandalorian and his allies, a brief gunfight breaks out between them and the stormtroopers. During this fight, Gideon seriously injures and nearly kills the Mandalorian by shooting a power generator near him, causing an explosion.

The Mandalorian and his party escape from the Imperials, but Gideon later encounters them elsewhere on the planet, where Gideon attacks them from above with his TIE fighter while they are on the ground. The Mandalorian uses his jetpack to fly after and attack Gideon's starfighter, connecting his grapple hook to the wing after briefly clinging to the top of the TIE fighter in mid-air. He places an explosive charge on the ship and it explodes, causing the damaged TIE fighter to crash in the distance, which allows the Mandalorian and his allies to escape. In the final scene of the episode and season, Gideon is shown to have survived the crash, and he extracts himself from the wreckage by cutting through the TIE fighter's metal exterior with the Darksaber, a black-bladed lightsaber which is an ancient Mandalorian artifact.

=== The Mandalorian season two ===
In "Chapter 11: The Heiress", Gideon is contacted by the captain of an Imperial freighter on the oceanic moon Trask, which was come under siege by the Mandalorian and a group of other Mandalorian warriors led by Bo-Katan Kryze, who is targeting Imperial cargo ships in the hopes of reclaiming the Darksaber. Deeming the ship doomed, Gideon orders the captain to destroy it and everyone aboard. The Mandalorians manage to prevent the ship's destruction, though the captain commits suicide, more afraid of Gideon than Bo-Katan Kryze.

Gideon's plan is partially revealed in "Chapter 12: The Siege", in which the Mandalorian, Greef, Cara, and their Mythrol companion infiltrate a secret cloning facility at an Imperial base on Nevarro. There, they discover several bodies encased in tanks and a recorded message from Dr. Pershing to Gideon. Pershing states that he requires access to Grogu's blood, which is needed to provide a body with Force-sensitivity. However, several of the experiments have failed. Gideon makes a physical appearance at the end of the episode, standing in a chamber filled with Dark Troopers, aboard his cruiser. An officer informs him that the Mandalorian is still in possession of Grogu and that a tracking beacon has been placed on his ship, the Razor Crest.

In "Chapter 14: The Tragedy", Gideon tracks the Mandalorian to Tython and sends two shuttles of stormtroopers to capture Grogu. While the Mandalorian and the recently arrived Boba Fett and Fennec Shand fight them off, they fail to prevent Grogu from being taken by four of Gideon's Dark Troopers, and the Razor Crest from being destroyed by an orbital strike from Gideon's cruiser. Escaping with Grogu, Gideon witnesses him using his Force powers on two stormtroopers that he throws around his holding cell, before stunning him and preparing to take him to Dr. Pershing to complete the blood transfusion.

In "Chapter 16: The Rescue", the Mandalorian and his team infiltrate Gideon's ship, where Grogu is held hostage. Gideon offers Grogu to the Mandalorian on the condition that he leave the ship. However, Gideon attacks the Mandalorian with the Darksaber. The Mandalorian wins the duel and hands Gideon over to Cara Dune. When the Mandalorian tries to give the Darksaber to Bo-Katan, Gideon reveals that the wielder of the blade has a claim to the throne of Mandalore and that the blade can only be won in battle. A squadron of dark troopers attempt to rescue Gideon, but they are destroyed by Luke Skywalker, who has come to take Grogu for him to be trained as a Jedi. Defeated, Gideon attempts suicide but is foiled by Cara Dune and taken into custody.

=== The Book of Boba Fett ===
Gideon is briefly mentioned in the spinoff show The Book of Boba Fett, set after season two of The Mandalorian. In "Chapter 5: Return of the Mandalorian", the Mandalorian explains to the survivors of his tribe that he had defeated Gideon, one of the perpetrators of the "Purge of Mandalore", to claim the Darksaber and that Gideon had been turned over to the New Republic to be tried for his crimes. The Armorer explains to the Mandalorian that ownership of the Darksaber made Gideon the "Heir to Mandalore" before the Mandalorian had won it from him, a title that is now his, although due to removing his helmet, he cannot be considered a Mandalorian by their tribe before bathing in the caves beneath the ruined Mandalore.

=== The Mandalorian season three ===
After the ending of "Chapter 16: The Rescue", it was assumed that Moff Gideon had been arrested and brought to trial. However, in the ending of "Chapter 21: The Pirate", the wreckage of the transport ship that was carrying him to trial was found by Carson Teva with a fragment of Beskar alloy left behind.

In "Chapter 23: The Spies", it is revealed that Elia Kane (one of the bridge officers of Gideon's ship when the Mandalorian attacked it in the Season 2 finale and who targeted Dr. Pershing on his behalf in "Chapter 19: The Convert") has been working as a spy in the New Republic for Moff Gideon and that Gideon has been amassing a new army on Mandalore. Moff Gideon attends a meeting alongside members of the Shadow Council, a group of Imperial remnant leaders including Captain Gilad Pellaeon and Commandant Brendol Hux (father of the Star Wars sequel trilogy's General Hux). Moff Gideon begins questioning Pellaeon about Grand Admiral Thrawn's leadership of the Imperial remnant and when he would return from the Outer Rim while requesting military reinforcements after discovering that the Mandarlorians were planning on retaking Mandalore after "Chapter 22: Guns for Hire". As Bo-Katan Kryze and the Mandalorian discover Gideon's military base on Mandalore, Gideon reveals himself to the Mandalorians donning a new suit of Mandalorian armor, boasting of his newfound power and that he will aggregate the best resources of Mandalore, cloners, and Jedi to create an army with which to bring order to the galaxy. After having a disarmed Djarin taken to the briefing room, Gideon orders his fleet of TIE Interceptors and TIE Bombers to begin attacking the Mandalorian fleet in orbit above Mandalore causing Bo-Katan to evacuate the Mandalorians while Paz Vizsla buys everyone time to get away, managing to kill all of Gideon's men before the three Praetorian Guards that Gideon requested to the Shadow Council arrive and dispatch Vizsla.

In "Chapter 24: The Return", after Din Djarin escapes captivity with Grogu's help and sets out to hunt down Gideon, they discover a number of dormant clones of Gideon and destroy them, before confronting Gideon himself. Gideon reveals that his project with Dr. Pershing was to create a force of perfect warriors in his own likeness, with Mandalorian weapons and armour, and Jedi power of the force. As Gideon and Din Djarin do battle, back on the surface, Bo-Katan's reinforcements have arrived, and she launches her attack on Gideon's base. Gideon's TIE Interceptors ravage the Mandalorians' capital ship, and Axe Woves sets it on a collision course with the base. The three Praetorian Guards take over the fight against Din Djarin, but Grogu draws them away, to Din Djarin's horror, but with his help Din Djarin kills the three Praetorian Guards. Bo-Katan arrives to assist, and she confronts Gideon while Din Djarin joins Grogu to dispatch the Guards. Gideon defeats Bo-Katan by crushing the Darksaber, but before he can kill her, Din Djarin and Grogu return, the capital ship plunges into the base, and a fiery blast engulfs Gideon while Grogu protects himself and the two Mandalorians with a force shield.

=== Other media ===
Moff Gideon appears as a playable character in the mobile role-playing game, Star Wars: Galaxy of Heroes. He also appears as a DLC character in Lego Star Wars: The Skywalker Saga as part of The Mandalorian season 2 pack.

Gideon appeared as a playable character in Fortnite on August 13th 2024, buyable in the item shop.

== Characterization ==
This guy is a fierce guy. You have a great amount of expectations surrounding his appearance because we don't know whether he's good or bad. The universe has fallen. Someone is trying to put it back together. Is it an organization? Is it a government? What is it? Is it a militia? Who is this person, who seems to know everything about everyone? We have a bit of a mysterious character, but once you see him and you get to know him, you'll be intrigued by how he wields his power.

— Giancarlo Esposito

Gideon is a dangerous and fierce man, who does not hesitate to harm or kill anyone to get what he wants. Though leading a remnant of the Galactic Empire, Gideon freely admits that he acts in his own self-interest, and in the first-season finale of The Mandalorian he explicitly states to the Mandalorian and his allies that they cannot trust him and he would gladly kill them all. Gideon does not hesitate to kill his own men when they fail him, or even for mere annoyances, like when they interrupt him. Sly, intimidating, and unforgiving, Gideon is extremely determined to achieve his goals, and is willing to sacrifice the lives of his men to get Grogu. His motivation to get Grogu appears personal, as he tells the Mandalorian: "it means more to me than you will ever know".

Gideon is a strong military strategist, and despite the fall of the Empire still wields power, commanding a considerable number of Imperial forces, including people, equipment, and spaceships. Stephanie Dube Dwilson of Heavy.com noted that while many of the remnant Imperial stormtroopers featured throughout the first season had worn and dirty armor, the troopers under Gideon's command had new and pristine armor, reflecting Gideon's stature. Through his past association with the Imperial Security Bureau, Gideon had access to a great deal of classified intelligence, and as a result, he is extremely knowledgeable about topics unknown to most other characters in the series. Giancarlo Esposito said the character "seems to know everything about everyone", as illustrated in the season finale, when he reveals he knows the names and biographical details of the Mandalorian, Cara Dune, and Greef Karga.

Esposito has rejected simple classifications of Gideon as a "good" or "bad" character, noting that he is attempting to restore stability to the galaxy following the fall of the Empire. Esposito felt Gideon becomes "sort of the guardian of the people" after the Empire's decline, and that in attempting to bring order to a lawless time, the character could be seen as a "savior". Esposito said of the character: "Is he good? Is he bad? We don't know. We do know that the world needs someone to put it back together." He felt this moral ambiguity was particularly applicable to the real world at the time in which the series was released, saying: "Leaders who exhibit kind of a faulty power because they still have ideas that they want to aggrandize themselves; we're in that world now." Gideon has a vision for the future, and a strong personal sense of order, one of the driving principles of the Empire, which had a militaristic approach to policing the galaxy that Gideon also embraces.

Several reviewers have suggested that Gideon may be actively attempting to emulate Darth Vader, one of the major characters from the Star Wars franchise who had been an agent of the Empire. Gideon's personality and behavior also bear similarities to Vader, including his tendency to execute underlings who disappoint him. Kevin Melrose of Comic Book Resources also noted that Gideon's TIE fighter crash near the end of the first-season finale is similar to Vader's final scene in the original Star Wars film when his TIE Advanced fighter is sent spiraling out of control into space.

== Concept and creation ==
=== Portrayal ===
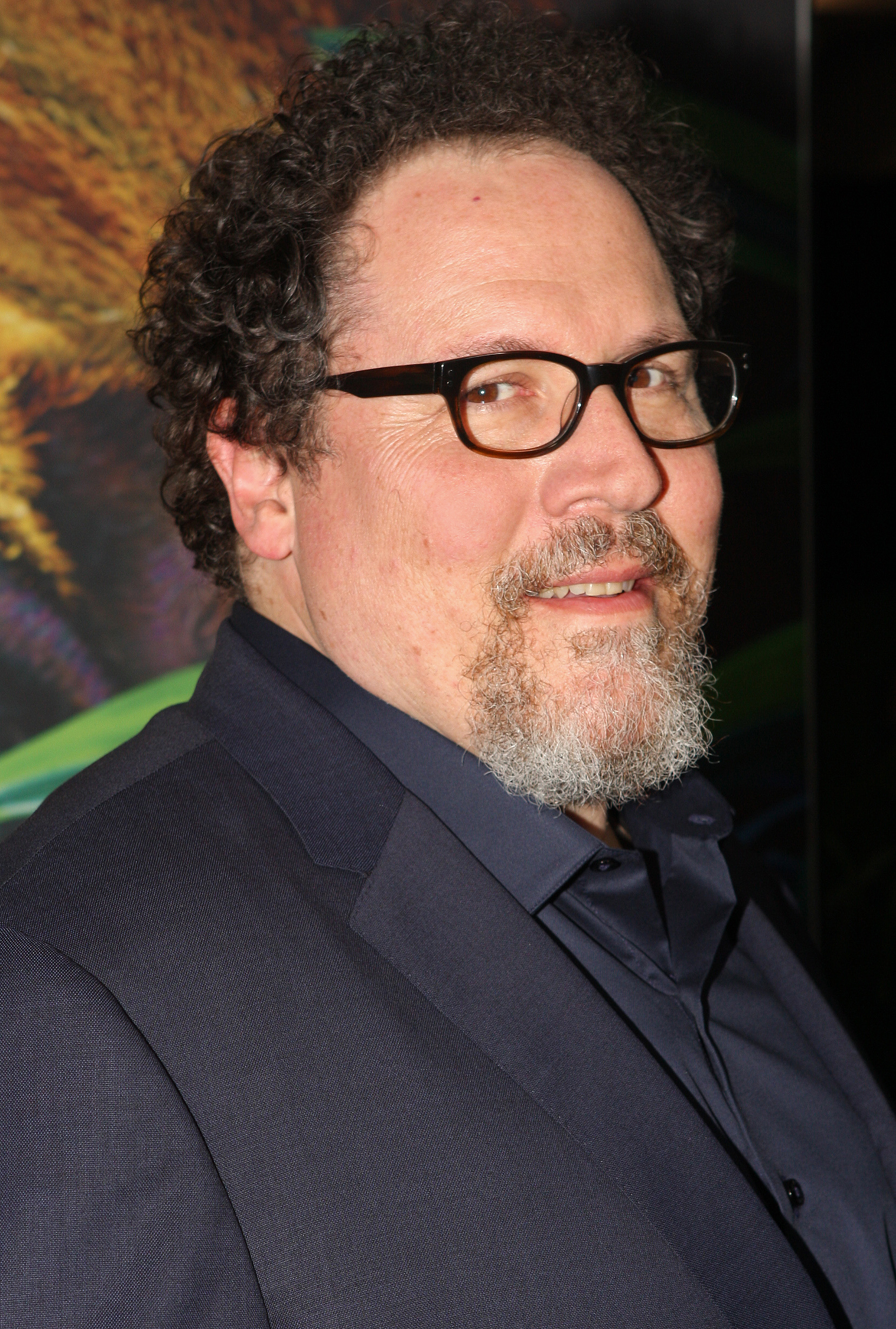
Jon Favreau, The Mandalorian creator and showrunner with whom Esposito had previously worked on several projects recruited Giancarlo Esposito for the part of Moff Gideon.

Moff Gideon is portrayed in The Mandalorian by Giancarlo Esposito. He was recruited for the part by series creator and showrunner Jon Favreau. Esposito and Favreau had previously worked together on several previous projects, starting with the pilot for the post-apocalyptic science fiction television series Revolution, which Favreau directed and in which Esposito starred. Favreau next directed Esposito in a commercial for the video game Destiny, which led to Favreau casting him in his film adaptation of The Jungle Book (2016). Esposito said one of the first things he did after accepting the role was to contact his friend Samuel L. Jackson, the actor who portrayed Mace Windu in the Star Wars prequel trilogy, and say: "Yo man, I'm in that series too, dude!"

The casting of Esposito was announced on December 12, 2018. Details about his character were not immediately revealed, though there was early speculation he might be playing a villain due to his past performance as Gus Fring, one of the primary antagonists of Breaking Bad and an important character in its spinoff Better Call Saul. Footage of Gideon was first publicly shown at the Star Wars Celebration convention in Chicago on April 14, 2019, which included a brief shot of the character flying his TIE Fighter. Esposito was on-hand at the D23 Expo on August 23, 2019, for the release of the first public trailer of The Mandalorian. Gideon also appeared briefly in a second trailer released on October 28, 2019.

In preparation for the role, Esposito rewatched the Star Wars films to get a sense of the "style of the films" and to try to get a feeling for what it would be like to be in that fictional universe. Esposito was a fan of the original Star Wars trilogy film prior to joining The Mandalorian, though he said he was less interested in the later prequel films because they "became more and more in a different vein than what I wanted to be in". Regarding the original Star Wars films, Esposito said:

For me, these films, they formed a part of my childhood and they gave me the ability to dream and to feel like they would take me to another place. And when you have a film that does that in an imaginary world that could be so real, it's very exciting for you. They taught me how to feel like a champion, how to feel like there are always going to be challenges but that if we are able to come together as a family somehow and if I can believe in myself, I can overcome anything.

Esposito was disappointed with the lack of diversity in the older Star Wars films and appreciated that there were more minority actors in the later productions, as well as in the cast of The Mandalorian, which he credited to Favreau. He called being cast as Moff Gideon "a dream come true", and said of the role: "He's a very interesting character and I'm so honored to be a part of this production." After the show aired, Giancarlo said two of his four daughters sent him text messages urging him not to hurt the Child, who had become an Internet sensation. Esposito said he jokingly responded: "I will squash that little big-eared bastard."

=== Costume ===
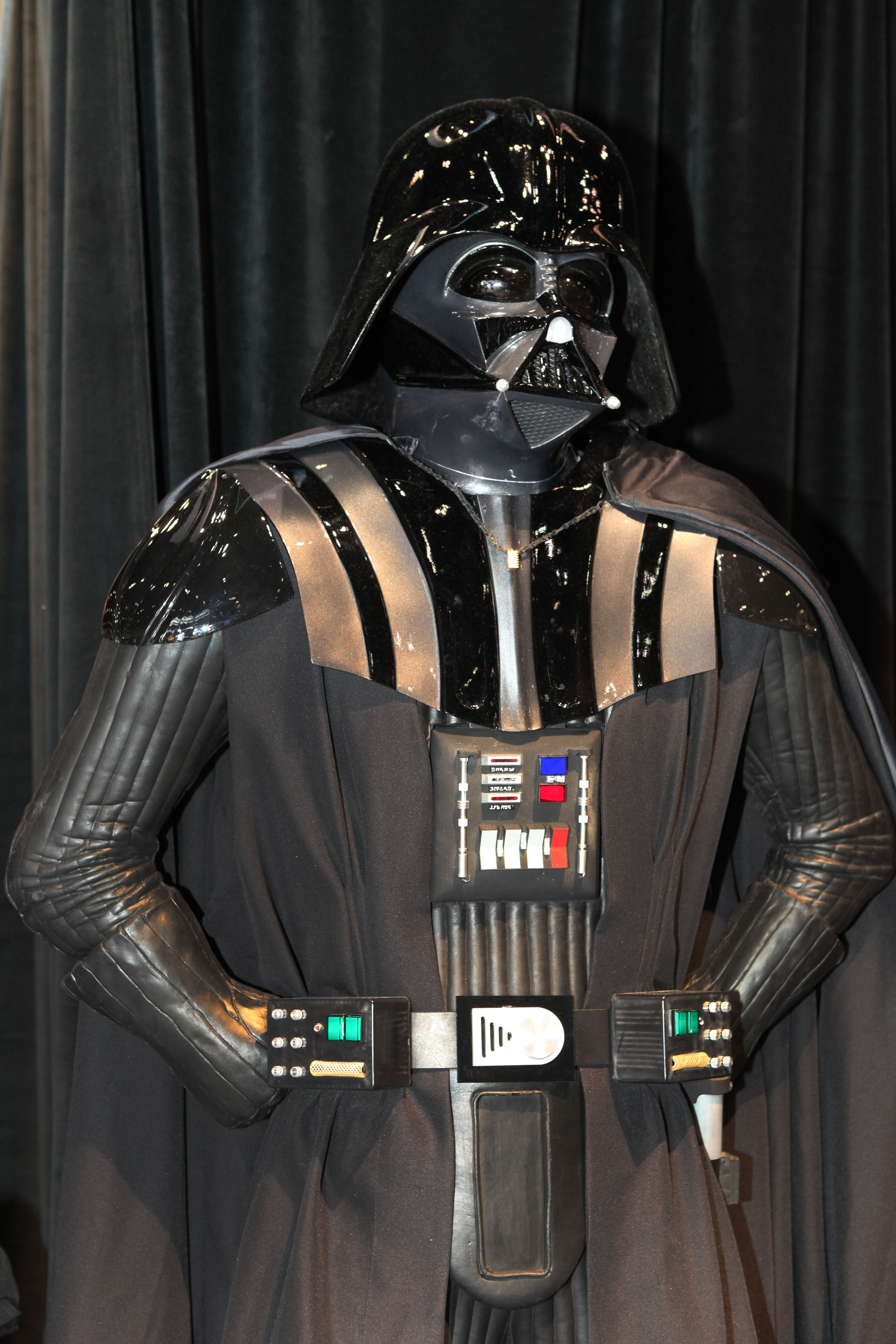
Several reviewers have noted similarities between the costume of Moff Gideon and that of Star Wars character Darth Vader (pictured).

Moff Gideon's costume was designed by Brian Matyas, concept designer and artist for The Mandalorian. He called designing Gideon's costume "one of the highlights for me on the show, and for my career as a whole". The costume was created based upon the design by costume designer Joseph Porro, with props and costume fabrication by Frank Ippolito via Ippolito's company Thingergy Inc. The costume is all-black and includes body armor, a cape, and an elaborate chest piece, and several reviewers have noted the costume's similarities to that of Star Wars character Darth Vader. Esposito called his costume "incredible", and said he wanted to keep his costume and props after filming, but was not able to: "They said to me, it's all going to wind up in a museum. You're going to be so honored when you see it there in a couple of years. But you can't have it now."

=== Filming ===
Esposito's scenes for The Mandalorian were filmed on a sound stage in Southern California on a "Volume", a large warehouse-like motion-capture stage with green screens and tracking cameras spread throughout the space. Using a combination of physical set pieces and images projected onto the screens, the Volume allows the actors to be filmed and placed into a digital environment. Esposito said of filming scenes in the Volume: "we can control the physical atmosphere of what is projected on the walls and control how gravity is; you get a feeling that gravity is being played with".

Esposito particularly enjoyed working with Taika Waititi, the director of the season finale, whom he described as "in his own world creatively" and called "a very different and odd human being, but aren't we all as creative artists?" The sequences with Moff Gideon flying his TIE Fighter were filmed in the Volume, and Waititi was very detail-oriented in working with Esposito on the scenes. For example, Waititi gave Esposito very specific feedback on what he felt Esposito should be doing with his feet during the final scene when he cuts himself free from the crashed TIE Fighter. Esposito found this direction confusing, saying: "What's bugging you about the way my feet are? I'm on [a] globe 30 feet in [the] sky." Esposito said he enjoyed seeing and interacting with the animatronic puppet of Grogu during filming, saying: "It melts my heart, because the reality is, this little baby does things that you could never imagine and when you look at those eyes and that little body, how can you not help but fall in love?" Esposito had not seen the finished footage of The Mandalorian until a few months before the show aired.

== Reception ==
Moff Gideon has been received positively by reviewers and fans alike. Scott Snowden of Space.com said Giancarlo Esposito "plays the role to perfection". Sean Keane of CNET called the character "absolutely magnificent" and "pretty damn scary". Screen Rant writer Kiki Evans said Moff Gideon "makes quite a terrifying villain". Kevin Pantoja, also from Screen Rant, said the character "immediately feels like a major threat" upon his introduction to the show. Stephanie Dube Dwilson of Heavy.com said the character "strikes the perfect mix of potentially crazy and very powerful". SyFy writer Matthew Jackson said though Gideon's appearance in the first season was brief, it was also impactful, writing: "The character quickly established himself as a force to be reckoned with." Brian Silliman, also of SyFy, called Moff Gideon a "formidable" villain. IGN writer Laura Prudom said the first season ends with Moff Gideon positioned as "a worthy adversary" for the Mandalorian and his allies. Ben Pearson of /Film said the character "made a big impact" in the season finale. Caitlin Gallagher of Bustle noted that immediately after "Chapter 7: The Reckoning" aired, many fans expressed "outrage, sadness, and anxiety" about Moff Gideon, particularly on social media websites, due to his role in the death of the character Kuiil and the kidnapping of the Child at the end of that episode. Moff Gideon ranked second on a Screen Rant list of the most interesting characters from the first season of The Mandalorian, third on a separate list of the ten best characters from the show, and his costume was ranked seventh on a list of the ten best costumes in the first season.

For his performance as Gideon in the Season One finale, Esposito was nominated for a Primetime Emmy Award for Outstanding Guest Actor in a Drama Series.
