= Bo-Katan Kryze =

Character in Star Wars

- Star Wars character
- Katee Sackhoff as Bo-Katan Kryze in "Chapter 11: The Heiress" of The Mandalorian
- First appearance: "A Friend in Need"; The Clone Wars; (2012)
- Created by: Dave Filoni
- Designed by: Darren Marshall
- Voiced by: Katee Sackhoff
- Portrayed by: Katee Sackhoff

In-universe information
- Gender: Female
- Title: Lady
- Occupation: Lieutenant of the Death Watch; Leader of the Nite Owls; Ruler of Mandalore
- Affiliation: House Kryze; Death Watch; Darth Maul's Shadow Collective; Nite Owls; Galactic Republic; Rebel Alliance – Ghost Cell; Children of the Watch
- Weapon: The Darksaber
- Family: Adonai Kryze (father); Satine Kryze (sister); Korkie Kryze (nephew)
- Homeworld: Mandalore

Bo-Katan Kryze (pronounced /boʊ kəˈtɑːn kriːz/; BO-kə-TAHN KREEZ) is a fictional character in the Star Wars franchise. She was introduced in the animated television series Star Wars: The Clone Wars, in which she was voiced by Katee Sackhoff. Sackhoff subsequently reprised her role in the sequel series Star Wars Rebels, and made her live-action debut as the character in the second season of the Disney+ series The Mandalorian.

In The Clone Wars, Bo-Katan is a member of the Death Watch, a terrorist faction of Mandalorians who wish to restore the ancient warrior ways of their planet, Mandalore. She is also the sister of Duchess Satine Kryze, the pacifist ruler of Mandalore, from whom she is estranged due to differences in their politics. She later allies herself with former Jedi Ahsoka Tano and the Galactic Republic in liberating Mandalore from Darth Maul. In Rebels, Bo-Katan is declared the new ruler of Mandalore. In The Mandalorian, after the Great Purge of Mandalore, she seeks to recover the Darksaber from Moff Gideon and retake her homeworld.

== Concept and creation ==
On January 13, 2012, Bo-Katan Kryze first appeared in the Star Wars: The Clone Wars fourth season episode "A Friend in Need," voiced by Katee Sackhoff. Although not originally included in the script for the episode, director Dave Filoni added the character to set up a greater role in the series' fifth season. Due to the series' initial cancellation, and renewal years later, Bo-Katan would not reappear in The Clone Wars until the series' seventh and final season in 2020. During the hiatus between the sixth and seventh seasons of The Clone Wars, Bo-Katan appeared in several episodes of Star Wars Rebels, in episodes set fifteen years after the events of The Clone Wars.

Bo-Katan's name is a mnemonic riff on the words "boogie-cat-Anne" pronounced together, referring to the name of the cat belonging to Filoni's wife, herself named Anne. Bo-Katan is a warrior at her core, and left the politics of leadership to the diplomats like her sister Duchess Satine Kryze. She has her faults, and a strong sense of her own self-importance, but she understands the Mandalorian warrior culture and over time grows into her role as a leader.

On November 16, 2019, Sackhoff confirmed that she would portray Bo-Katan in live-action in the then-upcoming second season of The Mandalorian, appearing in "Chapter 11: The Heiress", released on November 13, 2020. Costume designer Shawna Trpcic commissioned sculptor Jose Fernandez and his Ironhead Studios to build Mandalorian armor for Bo-Katan. Sackhoff had hoped to play the character in live action but expected that it would be recast with someone more famous such as Scarlett Johansson. When she finally wore the armor for the first time she was overwhelmed and cried with joy.

== Appearances ==
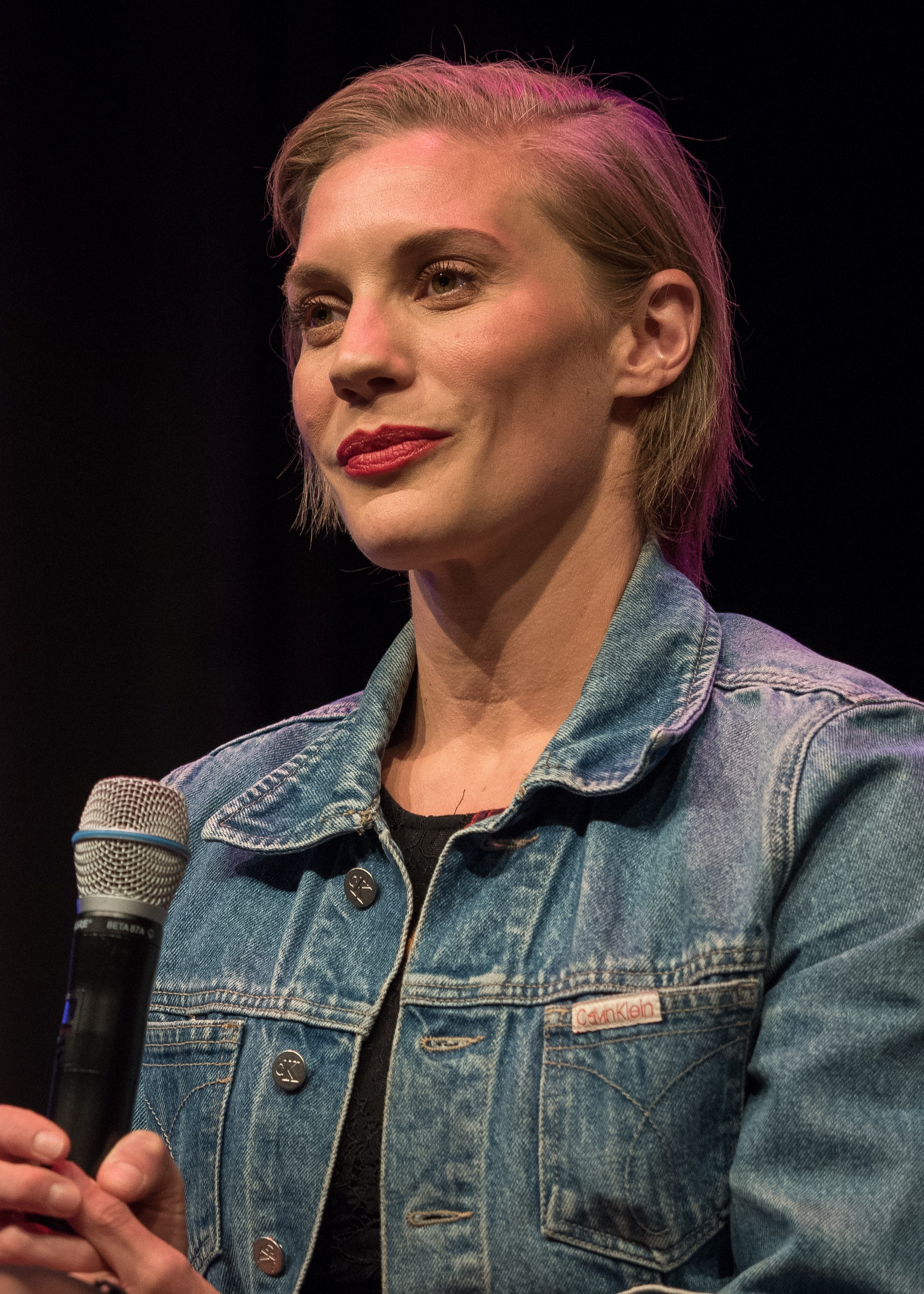
Bo-Katan Kryze was voiced and later also portrayed in live-action by Katee Sackhoff.

=== Star Wars: The Clone Wars ===
Bo-Katan Kryze (voiced by Katee Sackhoff) first appeared in the fourth season of Star Wars: The Clone Wars, in the episode "A Friend in Need" as the lieutenant of Death Watch, a terrorist group seeking to overthrow the pacifist government of Mandalore, under the leadership of Pre Vizsla (voiced by Jon Favreau). She leads the Nite Owls, an elite unit within the Death Watch. In this episode, Lux Bonteri meets with Death Watch on Carlac to join forces against Count Dooku. Ahsoka Tano and R2-D2 are forced to accompany him; they encounter Bo-Katan, who puts Ahsoka to work with women from a local village who have been enslaved by the Death Watch. Bo-Katan and the Death Watch later burn down the village and murder the innocent villagers. Ahsoka reveals herself as a Jedi and fights off the Death Watch before being taken prisoner, but is freed shortly after. While Ahsoka, R2-D2 and Lux escape towards their ship, Bo-Katan pursues them and tries to kill Ahsoka, but is defeated.

Bo-Katan reappears in the fifth season episodes "Eminence", "Shades of Reason" and "The Lawless". In this story arc, the Death Watch ally themselves with Darth Maul and several crime syndicates (in an alliance known as the Shadow Collective) with the intent of performing false flag operations against the Mandalorian people in order to stage a coup against Duchess Satine Kryze, the pacifist ruler of Mandalore and Bo-Katan's sister. Bo-Katan believes that Sith are no better than Jedi and distrusts the gangsters, but is outvoted. Once the Death Watch conquers Mandalore, they betray Maul, but he challenges Vizsla to a duel for the right to rule Mandalore. Maul defeats Vizsla and kills him with his own Darksaber, but Bo-Katan refuses to accept an outsider as a ruler and flees with the Death Watch members loyal to her. They later save Satine, but the former Duchess is recaptured. Soon after, Obi-Wan Kenobi arrives on Mandalore to rescue her as well. Maul murders Satine and has Obi-Wan taken to prison; however, Bo-Katan and her forces free him. She helps him escape so that he may bring the forces of the Galactic Republic upon Mandalore to remove Maul from power.

In the seventh and final season, Bo-Katan and the Nite Owls continue to fight against Maul. While on a mission on Oba Diah, Bo-Katan, Ursa Wren and another Nite Owl spot Ahsoka and follow her back to Coruscant, where Kryze puts aside her differences and recruits her. Ahsoka and Bo-Katan contact Obi-Wan Kenobi and Anakin Skywalker, requesting that the Republic assist them in reclaiming Mandalore from Maul. Though reluctant at first, the Jedi decide to send a division of the 501st Legion under Commander Rex to stage an invasion that becomes known as the Siege of Mandalore. They succeed in overthrowing Maul and Bo-Katan is declared regent.

=== Star Wars Rebels ===
Bo-Katan returns in the Star Wars Rebels fourth-season premiere and television film "Heroes of Mandalore". During the Galactic Empire's occupation of Mandalore, Bo-Katan refused to serve the Empire and was forced to abdicate, being replaced by Clan Saxon. Seeing herself as unworthy to lead, she initially refuses the Darksaber from Sabine Wren, who recovered it from Maul. In "Heroes of Mandalore", Bo-Katan and her Mandalorian allies combine efforts with the Ghost crew in destroying "The Duchess", a weapon created by Sabine that is capable of destroying Beskar armor. Governor Tiber Saxon captures Sabine and Bo-Katan, threatening to kill Kryze if Wren does not upgrade the weapon. Sabine reprograms the weapon to target stormtrooper armor and kill Saxon, but Bo-Katan warns her against sinking to the Empire's level. Heeding Bo-Katan, Sabine destroys the weapon and allows the Rebels to free Mandalore from the Empire's control. Bo-Katan eventually accepts the Darksaber from Sabine, becoming the ruler of Mandalore once more as the surviving Mandalorians pledge loyalty to her.

=== The Mandalorian ===
==== Season Two ====
Sackhoff reprises her role in the second season of The Mandalorian, appearing in "Chapter 11: The Heiress" for the character's first live-action appearance. Caitlin Dechelle and Caitlin Hutson served as her stunt doubles. In the third season of The Mandalorian, Sackhoff is credited as starring alongside Pedro Pascal (who was previously the only actor credited as starring in the show).

In "Chapter 11", Bo-Katan, Koska Reeves, and Axe Woves rescue Din Djarin "the Mandalorian" and the Child from a group of Quarren. They remove their helmets and Bo-Katan explains her history, also revealing to the Mandalorian that his sect of Mandalorians, the Children of the Watch, who follow the strict ancient rules known as "the Way", are not the only sect Mandalorians, many of whom do not follow "the Way". Distrusting Bo-Katan because of this, the Mandalorian rejects their help. After they save him a second time, he agrees to help them seize weapons from an Imperial freighter, and Bo-Katan agrees to tell the Mandalorian where he can find a Jedi. During the raid, Bo-Katan interrogates the captain, wanting to know the whereabouts of Moff Gideon and if he has the Darksaber. Afterwards, she offers the Mandalorian the chance to join them despite their differences but he chooses to continue his quest. Bo-Katan tells him that he will find Ahsoka Tano in the city of Calodan on the planet of Corvus.

In "Chapter 16: The Rescue", the Mandalorian and Boba Fett approach Bo-Katan and Koska at a cantina to recruit them in their mission to rescue Grogu (The Child) from Moff Gideon. Bo-Katan is initially hostile to Boba and calls him a disgrace to his Mandalorian armor, since he is a clone. Nevertheless, she breaks a scuffle between Boba and Koska and agrees to help the Mandalorian under the condition that she will get Gideon's cruiser and the Darksaber from him, and the Mandalorian considers helping her to liberate Mandalore. The Mandalorian bests Gideon in combat, spoiling her plan to win back the Darksaber in combat herself. He attempts to surrender the weapon to her, but is told by Gideon that it must be won in combat. Bo-Katan does not accept the Darksaber from the Mandalorian.

==== Season Three ====
In "Chapter 17: The Apostate", the Mandalorian and Grogu visit Bo-Katan at her castle on Kalevala. Having failed to win the Darksaber, she has abandoned her plans to retake Mandalore, and her forces have gone. The Mandalorian seeks redemption by bathing in the Living Waters in the Mines of Mandalore, and she reluctantly tells him where to go. In "Chapter 18: The Mines of Mandalore", after the Mandalorian is caught in a trap, Grogu convinces Bo-Katan to travel to Mandalore and rescue him. Although she is cynical about the legends surrounding the Living Waters and wishes to leave the ruined planet, she agrees to continue and lead them to the mines herself. Bathing in the Living Waters, the Mandalorian is dragged underwater, and while rescuing him Bo-Katan witnesses a living mythosaur, an ancient creature of Mandalorian legend thought to be extinct. In "Chapter 19: The Convert", upon returning to Kalevala, they are attacked by Imperial ships, and bombers destroy her castle. The Mandalorian brings her to the covert's hidden base. The Armorer declares that the Mandalorian has been redeemed. As Bo-Katan also bathed in the Living Waters and has not removed her helmet since, she too is accepted into the covert. In "Chapter 20: The Foundling", Bo-Katan leads a rescue party when the foundling Ragnar Vizsla is abducted by a large winged raptor. Bo-Katan successfully rescues Ragnar and brings the raptor's chicks back to the enclave, which earns her the respect of the tribe. When the Armorer forges Bo-Katan a new pauldron, Bo-Katan reveals the existence of the mythosaur she saw on Mandalore, but the Armorer is dismissive.

Following the events of "Chapter 21: The Pirate", the Armorer summons Bo-Katan and orders her to take off her helmet - the Armorer believes that Bo-Katan can walk in both worlds, and reunite all Mandalorians. In "Chapter 22: Guns for Hire", Bo-Katan reunites with her former group of Mandalorians and challenges Axe Woves in combat. After forcing Woves to yield, he claims that they can not follow her as she does not hold the Darksaber. The Mandalorian Din Djarin, then retells the events of "Chapter 18: The Mines of Mandalore" where he had been captured and disarmed of the Darksaber, and that Bo-Katan slayed his captor using it. He deems her the rightful ruler through rule of combat because of this and returns the Darksaber to her. They return to Nevarro to unite the two Mandalorian factions and In "Chapter 23: The Spies", they move to reclaim their homeworld of Mandalore. The combined group searches for a location underground known as the Great Forge, but instead discover Moff Gideon's hidden base. Gideon wears an enhanced Dark Trooper suit of armor and his stormtroopers are equipped with beskar armor and jetpacks. They are trapped, the Mandalorian is captured but the rest barely manage to escape.

In "Chapter 24: The Return", Bo-Katan leads the Mandalorians against Moff Gideon's forces, but with his new armor he gains the upper hand and destroys the Darksaber. Having freed himself, The Mandalorian and Grogu return to help her fight on. Meanwhile, Axe Woves crashes a starship into the base, causing a gigantic explosion that kills Gideon while Grogu uses the Force to shield himself, the Mandalorian, and Bo-Katan, and the trio survive. Later, the Armorer restarts the Great Forge of Mandalore, and Bo-Katan is proclaimed the leader of all Mandalorians.
