= Mandalorians =

Fictional group of warrior people in the Star Wars universe

- Star Wars race
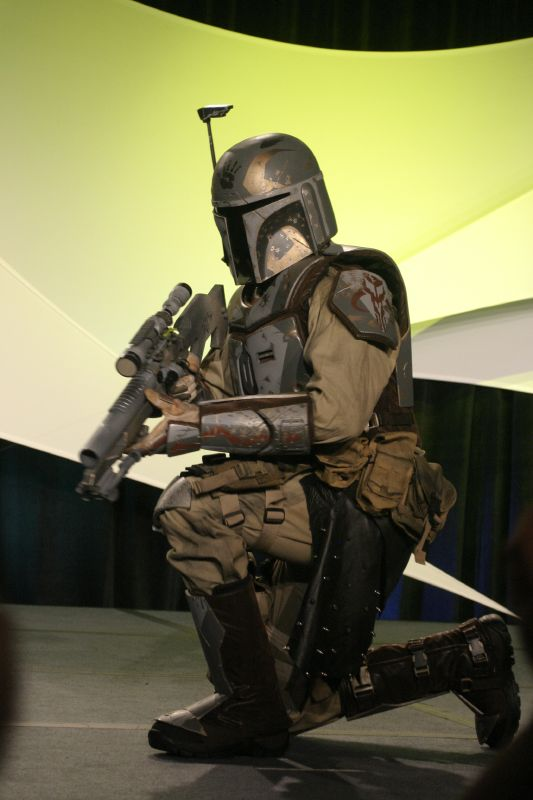
- Created by: Joe Johnston (design); George Lucas

In-universe information
- Home world: Mandalore
- Base of operations: Mandalore, Concordia, Concord Dawn system
- Language: Mando'a, Galactic Basic
- Affiliation: Galactic Republic; Confederacy of Independent Systems; Galactic Empire; Rebel Alliance; New Republic
- Notable members: The Armorer; Din Djarin; Boba Fett; Jango Fett; Bo-Katan Kryze; Canderous Ordo; Paz Vizsla; Pre Vizsla; Sabine Wren

Mandalorians are a fictional group of people associated with the planet Mandalore in the Star Wars universe and franchise created by Joe Johnston and George Lucas. Their appearance is often distinguished by gear such as battle helmets, armor, and jetpacks.

First conceptualized for The Empire Strikes Back as a group of white-armored "super troopers", the idea developed into a single bounty hunter character, Boba Fett. Although Fett was not identified as a Mandalorian in the film, his popularity inspired an extensive inquisition into Mandalorians in future Star Wars media, including novels, comics, television series, and video games.

The Star Wars Expanded Universe and the television series The Clone Wars, Rebels, and The Mandalorian expanded upon Mandalorian lore with the introduction of additional characters, and established the Mandalorians not as an "alien race or species", but a distinct ethnic cultural ideology of humans and various aliens from Mandalore and nearby worlds united by a common creed with a stoic, spartan warrior tradition.

== Creation and development ==
In production for The Empire Strikes Back (1980), Ralph McQuarrie and Joe Johnston designed armor intended to be worn by soldiers described as super-commandos from the Mandalore system, armed with weapons built into white suits and known for battling the Jedi. Initially, the soldiers were called Super Troopers and were intended to look alike. The group eventually developed into a single bounty hunter character, Boba Fett, and the costume was reworked, but it retained elements such as wrist lasers, rocket darts, a jetpack, and a missile.

In a 1979 issue of Bantha Tracks, the newsletter of the Official Star Wars Fan Club, Boba's armor was described as that of the "Imperial Shocktroopers, warriors from the olden time" who "came from the far side of the galaxy" and are few in number because they "were wiped out by the Jedi Knights during the Clone Wars". The backstory of the Mandalorians was first extensively explored in issues of Marvel Comics' original Star Wars comic book series (1977) series and various other Star Wars legends media, including comics by Dark Horse and video games by LucasArts.

Star Wars: Episode II – Attack of the Clones (2002) introduces the bounty hunter Jango Fett, who also wore Mandalorian armor, and was the adoptive father of Boba, a clone of Jango. More spin-off material explored Mandalorian lore, including the violent Death Watch sect. Following the acquisition of Lucasfilm by Disney in 2014, most existing spin-off material was declared non-canon. Only the films and spin-off works produced after April 25, 2014, are part of the restructured canon, including television series such as The Clone Wars, Rebels, and The Mandalorian, the latter of which heavily focuses on the Mandalorian creed.

== Appearances ==
=== Film ===
Mandalorians made their live action cinematic debut in The Empire Strikes Back (1980), with the bounty hunter Boba Fett, a supporting antagonist. The character previously appeared in the television special Star Wars Holiday Special (1978), and returned in Return of the Jedi (1983) and the prequel film Attack of the Clones (2002), the latter of which established him as a clone, raised by his genetic template, Jango Fett, to be his son. Jango is also a bounty hunter who is not explicitly identified as a Mandalorian in the film, but wears Mandalorian armor, which passes down to Boba Fett. In The Mandalorian, Boba refers to his father as a Mandalorian foundling.

=== Television series ===
==== The Clone Wars ====
The animated series Star Wars: The Clone Wars expands upon Mandalorian lore with the introduction of new characters, such as Duchess Satine Kryze, the pacifist leader of Mandalore and a romantic interest for the Jedi Master Obi-Wan Kenobi, and Pre Vizsla, the leader of the Death Watch faction of Mandalorians who seek to overthrow Satine and restore Mandalore's warrior traditions. Mandalore is depicted as the fictional home planet of the Mandalorian people, located in the Outer Rim in the sector and system of the same name. It has an inhabited moon called Concordia, a mining settlement to which Mandalorian warriors were exiled. Concord Dawn, located in the Mandalore sector, is also the homeworld of several Mandalorian characters, including Jango Fett, and the base of operations for the Protectors.

In The Clone Wars, the planet Mandalore is a largely uninhabitable desert, caused by a war with the Jedi that occurred before the timeframe of the series. The New Mandalorian people built their cities, such as the capital Sundari, in large biodomes. The design of Sundari draws on Cubist elements, and murals located in the city mimic Pablo Picasso's Guernica. The concept of Mandalore as a "large desolate planet of white sand with these cube-like buildings" was developed by Lucas early in development for The Clone Wars season two. Lucas also wanted layers of glass incorporated into the design. Because Sundari did not look enough like a giant city, the production team developed it into a dome with cubes on it. Filoni noted that the desolate and barren appearance was "kind of a Moebius-influenced design". Filoni had the shapes of Boba Fett's armor worked into the windows and the design of the architecture, feeling that the shapes were "emblematic" and that the warrior culture was so strong it was embedded into the architecture.

==== Rebels ====
It is established in Star Wars Rebels that Mandalorians had colonized other worlds, such as Concord Dawn and Krownest. The Mandalorians eventually came into contact with the Old Republic and fought their Jedi protectors. Upon seeing the Jedi's force abilities, the Mandalorians created gadgets, weapons and armor to counter Jedi abilities. Despite the animosity between the Mandalorians and the Jedi, Tarre Vizsla became the first Mandalorian Jedi. As a Jedi, Vizsla built the Darksaber and used it to unite his people as their Mand'alor. During Star Wars Rebels, a Mandalorian named Sabine Wren of Clan Wren discovers the Darksaber from Maul's hideout. With the Darksaber, she hoped to unite Mandalore and get her honor back after creating a weapon that would kill Mandalorians. Upon returning to Mandalore, she gained the support of her estranged mother Ursa. Sabine and her mother had differences of opinion as her mother turned to the Empire for support. Ultimately House Wren sides with Sabine. With the Darksaber, she rallies Clan Wren and takes arms against Clan Saxon, which has the backing of the Empire. After Clan Saxon is defeated, the Empire seemingly backs off from Mandalore, and Sabine renounces ownership of the Darksaber to Bo-Katan Kryze, sister of the late Duchess Satine Kryze, who promises to unite all Mandalorian clans under her leadership and restore peace to Mandalore.

==== The Mandalorian ====
At some point during the Galactic Civil War, between the events of Rebels (5–1 BBY) and Return of the Jedi (4 ABY), the Empire returned to Mandalore and purged the Mandalorian people, leaving only a few surviving clans and stealing large quantities of the precious Beskar metal, which no blaster or lightsaber can penetrate; this event became known as the "Great Purge" among Mandalorians. The Mandalorian follows the exploits of Din Djarin, also known simply as "The Mandalorian", or "Mando" for short, a bounty hunter not originally from Mandalore. He was orphaned on another planet during the Clone Wars (22–19 BBY) when Separatist battle droids killed his parents; saved by a Mandalorian clan called "The Tribe", Djarin was adopted as a Foundling and raised with their Creed ("The Way of the Mandalore", or simply "The Way"). The Yoda-like toddler that he adopts, Grogu, also known as "the Child", is also considered a foundling, but Djarin decides to return it to the Jedi after discovering it is Force-sensitive.

According to Bo-Katan Kryze in "Chapter 11: The Heiress", Djarin was found by the "Children of the Watch", a group of religious zealots who follow the ancient "Way of the Mandalore", consisting of various forgotten Mandalorian traditions, such as never removing their helmets in front of others; they were excluded from the mainstream of Mandalorian society for trying to spread their beliefs. Djarin thus finds out he's part of an extremist group without ever having known it; he was raised by The Armorer to believe only people who choose to follow the Creed are true Mandalorians. But this confrontation with Kryze's group of Nite Owls revealed that there were also other Mandalorians who were Mandalorian by ancestry, which share some broad cultural ideas and practices with the Watch such as wearing Mandalorian armor, but have no rule against removing one's helmet.

Moff Gideon, leading a faction of ex-Imperials, was personally involved in the Great Purge and obtained the Darksaber (a unique, black-bladed lightsaber symbolising dynastic authority on Mandalore) from Bo-Katan after defeating her in combat. During the show's second season, it is revealed that Bo-Katan, along with a small number of Mandalorian warriors willing to follow her, is attempting to reclaim the Darksaber and liberate Mandalore from Imperial occupation. In the season two finale, Djarin defeats Moff Gideon in combat, thus becoming the rightful owner of the Darksaber and the legitimate ruler of Mandalore, which Bo-Katan accepts; even though Djarin is not interested in ruling and would rather pass the Darksaber to her as they intended, she insists she needs to obtain it through combat. The season thus ends with a cliffhanger, as Djarin could either help Bo-Katan and her forces liberate Mandalore in exchange for their assistance in taking down Gideon, or they could become hostile over possession of the Darksaber and ideological differences. Despite his loyalty to the Creed-following Mandalorians who raised him, Djarin seems ever more open to Bo-Katan's Mandalorian views of the Way, as illustrated by his new willingness to remove his helmet on one occasion in front of living organisms.

Eventually Kryze and Djarin were able unite Djarin's tribe and Kryze's followers into reclaiming Mandalore from Gideon's Imperial remnant. After Gideon's demise, all Mandalorians were able to return to Mandalore.

=== Legends ===
In April 2014, Lucasfilm rebranded most of the licensed Star Wars novels, comics, and video games produced since the originating 1977 film Star Wars as Star Wars Legends and declared them noncanon to the franchise. Within the Legends continuity, the name "Mandalorian" is associated with a multi-species culture of warrior clans who adhere to the tenets of the Mandalorians. While most of them are humans, there are also Mandalorians of various other species. Mandalore serves as the Mandalorians' home planet. It was originally inhabited by the Taung, a simian species originally native to Coruscant who renamed themselves Mandalorian and created the culture practiced by later non-Taung Mandalorians after being expelled from Coruscant by pre-historic humans known as the Zhell. Mandalore is largely sparsely populated wilderness, and its capital city of Keldabe is located on a river that acts as a natural moat. Keldabe is described as an "anarchic fortress" characterized by dissimilar architectural styles.

==== Literature ====
Mandalorians debuted in Marvel's Star Wars #68: "The Search Begins", which describes the super-commandos, the official protectors of the planet Mandalore. They are described as being two of three survivors of the Clone Wars, in which they fought for Emperor Palpatine. In Tales of the Jedi, set thousands of years before the original Star Wars film, the Mandalorians are a major military power who side with the Sith in their war against the Jedi, and their leader is manipulated by the Sith into triggering a war with the Republic. They are defeated with the aid of Revan and Malak, and Revan ensures a new Mand'alor, the sole ruler of the Mandalorian people, cannot rise. Their unity as a people dissolved, and instead, the Mandalorians develop into a culture of wandering mercenaries. Through instructions from Revan, as depicted in Knights of the Old Republic and Knights of the Old Republic II: The Sith Lords, Canderous Ordo assumes the title of Mand'alor and reunites the warrior clans. Canderous thus redefined Mandalorians from a species to the idea 'that anybody who follows the Mandalorian warrior way could become a Mandalorian'.

Jango Fett: Open Seasons, set shortly before the Clone Wars, depicts the fighting between two factions: Death Watch, led by Tor Vizsla, and the True Mandalorians, led by Jango Fett's adoptive father Jaster Mereel and later Jango himself. A ruse orchestrated by Vizsla tricks the Jedi into attacking and killing all of the True Mandalorians except Jango, but Jango eventually kills Vizsla and scatters Death Watch.

In the Republic Commando novels, set during the Clone Wars, Mandalore is an independent planet, although many Mandalorian warriors fight for the Separatists. However, a group of Mandalorians had also acted as training sergeants for the clone trooper army under the direction of Jango Fett, and many clone troopers practice Mandalorian customs and traditions. After the establishment of the Galactic Empire, the Mandalorian people are characterized as wary of and reluctant to aid the Empire but unwilling to declare open rebellion because Mandalore lacks the resources to wage war. However, Death Watch reappears and openly supports the Empire.

The Empire wishes to mine the planet for its beskar, a blaster-resistant steel, and establishes a garrison in the capital. Beskar is also described as being lightsaber-proof in the reference book The Jedi Path (2010). Mandalore and its people reappear again in the Legacy of the Force novels, set forty years after the original Star Wars film, where Boba Fett is convinced by his granddaughter Mirta Gev to assume the title of Mand'alor and again reunite the Mandalorian people.

==== Video games ====
In the video game Star Wars: Knights of the Old Republic, set roughly 4000 years before the original Star Wars film, the Mandalorian leader (referred to as Mandalore the Ultimate) has been defeated, and no one rules the Mandalorian clans. Mandalorians are also present in the sequels: Knights of the Old Republic II: The Sith Lords, where players can visit a Mandalorian base on a moon called Dxun (where a new leader, Mandalore the Preserver, has ascended to the position), and The Old Republic, an MMORPG set almost four centuries after the previous two games.

== Characters ==
Many Mandalorians were organised in clans, such as Eldar, Kryze, Rook, Saxon, Vizsla, and Wren. Sometimes organisations were formed that transcended the usual boundaries between the clans, such as the Death Watch during the Clone Wars, which any Mandalorian and even non-Mandalorians could join and lead. The Death Watch, originally founded and led by members of Clan Vizsla, but later taken over by the non-Mandalorian Maul, has been variously characterised as a clan, a crime syndicate, and a warrior faction. Individuals such as Din Djarin (adopted into Mandalorian culture as a foundling by the Children of the Watch, which formed out of the Death Watch) are also shown as members of multi-ethnic organizations, such as the Nevarro-based Bounty Hunters' Guild. The Protectors of Concord Dawn were an organisation assigned to protect the royal house of Mandalore. After the Great Purge, Bo-Katan Kryze formed a cross-clan unit seeking to retrieve the Darksaber and restore Mandalore.

Name	Portrayal and Description
Almec	Voice: Julian Holloway (The Clone Wars)
Almec	Mandalorian politician who served as Prime Minister of Mandalore during the Clone Wars. A prominent supporter of Duchess Satine Kryze and her New Mandalorian government, he was imprisoned for his involvement in an illegal smuggling ring, but was later freed and reinstated as Prime Minister after Darth Maul took over the New Mandalorian capital city of Sundari. When Maul was later captured by Darth Sidious, Almec sent Mandalorian super commandos Gar Saxon and Rook Kast to rescue him. During the Siege of Mandalore, he was captured by warriors led by Bo-Katan Kryze, and later assassinated by Saxon while attempting to give information to Ahsoka Tano, Commander Rex and Bo-Katan.
The Armorer	Emily Swallow (The Mandalorian and The Book of Boba Fett)
The Armorer	Female Mandalorian armorer, survivor of the Great Purge, leader and member of The Tribe, and ally of Din Djarin.
Din Djarin (The Mandalorian/"Mando")	Pedro Pascal (The Mandalorian and The Book of Boba Fett)
Din Djarin (The Mandalorian/"Mando")	Mandalorian bounty hunter, and the titular protagonist of The Mandalorian. He is a foundling, having been adopted by the Children of the Watch after his biological parents were killed during the Clone Wars, a survivor of the Great Purge, a member of The Tribe, and the adoptive father of Grogu, an alien toddler, whom he is protecting from the remnants of the Galactic Empire and other threats while searching for his people, the Jedi.
Boba Fett	Jeremy Bulloch (The Empire Strikes Back and Return of the Jedi), Daniel Logan (Attack of the Clones), Temuera Morrison (The Mandalorian and The Book of Boba Fett) Voice: Jason Wingreen (The Empire Strikes Back), Temuera Morrison (The Empire Strikes Back [Special Edition]), Daniel Logan (The Clone Wars)
Boba Fett	Notorious Mandalorian bounty hunter. He is a clone of the bounty hunter Jango Fett, who raised him on Kamino as his son. Following his father's death at the hands of Jedi Master Mace Windu in Attack of the Clones, the young Fett honors his legacy by becoming a bounty hunter himself and begins a quest of vengeance against Windu, forming a small guild of bounty hunters, but eventually gives up on it and becomes one of the greatest bounty hunters in the galaxy. In The Empire Strikes Back, he is one of the six bounty hunters hired by Darth Vader to find the Millennium Falcon. Fett finds the ship and brings a bounty of its captain, Han Solo, frozen in carbonite, to Jabba the Hutt. He appears again in Return of the Jedi, at Jabba's palace. When Luke Skywalker and his friends come to rescue Han, Fett falls into the mouth of Jabba's Sarlacc during the fight. Fett survives this incident, but is scarred and loses his armor. In The Mandalorian, he rescues the assassin Fennec Shand, whom he recruits as his partner, and attempts to reclaim his armor from Din Djarin, who agrees to give it to him in exchange for Grogu's protection. Fett honors this agreement by helping Djarin rescue Grogu after he is captured by a remnant of the Empire. He and Shand later take over the remains of Jabba's criminal empire from Bib Fortuna. He then asks Djarin for help against the Pyke Syndicate.
Jango Fett	Temuera Morrison (Attack of the Clones)
Jango Fett	Mandalorian bounty hunter, chosen by Count Dooku to serve as the template for all the clones who made up the Galactic Republic's army. He is also the father of Boba Fett, whom, despite being another clone, Jango considers to be his "son". In Attack of the Clones, he is shown to be under Dooku's and the Confederacy of Independent Systems' employ, and takes part in the battle of Geonosis, where he is killed by Mace Windu in the Geonosian arena. According to Boba in The Mandalorian episode "Chapter 14: The Tragedy", Jango was a Mandalorian foundling and fought in the Mandalorian Civil Wars at some point prior to the Clone Wars.
Hark	Voice: Andrew Kishino (Rebels)
Hark	Male Mandalorian warrior who served as a captain in the Imperial Super Commandos under Tiber Saxon.
Rook Kast	Voice: Vanessa Marshall (The Clone Wars and Maul – Shadow Lord)
Rook Kast	Female Mandalorian super commando who served under Darth Maul. She aided Maul's escape from Darth Sidious and commanded his forces during the Siege of Mandalore, until Maul betrayed them all and allowed them to be captured by Bo-Katan's warriors. During the early Imperial era she remained loyal to Maul and continued aiding him, until she was killed by Darth Vader.
Bo-Katan Kryze	Katee Sackhoff (The Mandalorian) Voice: Katee Sackhoff (The Clone Wars, Rebels and Tales of the Empire)
Bo-Katan Kryze	Female Mandalorian, leader of the Nite Owls, and member of the Death Watch, second-in-command to Pre Vizsla and sister to the Death Watch's political enemy, Duchess Satine. She opposed Vizsla's alliance with Darth Maul and Savage Oppress, and later led members of the Death Watch loyal to her against those who remained loyal to Maul and his criminal allies. Following the Clone Wars, she briefly became Regent of Mandalore until her refusal to follow the newly appointed Emperor Palpatine resulted with Clan Saxon being placed in power. Siding with Clan Wren during the Mandalorian Civil War, believing that she had lost the right, she accepted the Darksaber from Sabine to lead their people once more as Regent of Mandalore after Sabine and their people convinced her that there was no other that could do it better; she would later lose the Darksaber to Moff Gideon during the Great Mandalorian Purge. Five years following the Empire's defeat, Bo-Katan planned to reunite the survivors of the purge and liberate Mandalore from Imperial occupation. She enlisted Din Djarin's help in raiding an Imperial freighter transporting weapons, where she had hoped to find the Darksaber, in exchange for telling him where to find Ahsoka Tano, her old Jedi ally from during the Siege of Mandalore. Bo-Katan later agreed to help Djarin rescue Grogu from Moff Gideon in exchange for the Darksaber and his assistance in liberating Mandalore. After Gideon's defeat at Djarin's hands, Bo-Katan renounced the Darksaber, as Djarin had become its rightful owner by besting Gideon in combat.
Satine Kryze	Voice: Anna Graves (The Clone Wars)
Satine Kryze	Duchess of Mandalore, sister of Bo-Katan, and romantic interest of Obi-Wan Kenobi, hailing from the planet Kalevala of the Mandalore system. A pacifist leader, she tried not to get involved in the Clone Wars and formed the Council of Neutral Systems, much to the disgust of the Death Watch, who tried to assassinate and replace her numerous times throughout the war, but all their attempts were thwarted by the Jedi, particularly Kenobi. The Jedi Master had previously protected Satine in her youth, and the two formed a close bond, with Kenobi claiming that he would have left the Jedi Order a long time ago had Satine asked. Satine later watched her world fall to the Shadow Collective, under Darth Maul, who ultimately murdered her in front of a captured Kenobi.
Tal Merrik	Voice: Greg Proops (The Clone Wars)
Tal Merrik	Senator of Kalevala and member of the Council of Neutral Systems. He appeared to be an ally of Duchess Satine, but was secretly working with the Death Watch to overthrow her. After Obi-Wan Kenobi uncovered his treason, Merrik took Satine hostage. He planned to escape the starship they were on and blow it up, but was killed by Anakin Skywalker while being confronted by Kenobi.
Ketsu Onyo	Voice: Gina Torres (Rebels and Forces of Destiny)
Ketsu Onyo	Mandalorian bounty hunter and former estranged friend of Sabine Wren. She and Sabine were cadets at the Imperial Academy, later escaping and becoming bounty hunting partners before Ketsu left Sabine for dead and began working for the Black Sun. After they reconciled, Ketsu aided the Rebel Alliance.
Fenn Rau	Voice: Kevin McKidd (Rebels)
Fenn Rau	Leader of the Protectors of Concord Dawn. During the Clone Wars, he saved the lives of Kanan Jarrus (then known as Caleb Dume) and his master Depa Billaba in the Third Battle of Mygeeto. He accepted Imperial bribes to prevent Rebels from traveling through his system, but later ordered his men to permit Rebel passage to keep the Empire away after being captured by Sabine. He sided with the Rebellion after his men were slaughtered by the Imperial Super Commandos and eventually joined Clan Wren in the Mandalorian Civil War.
Koska Reeves	Sasha Banks (The Mandalorian)
Koska Reeves	Member of the Nite Owls who accompanied Bo-Katan on her quest to reunite survivors of the Great Mandalorian Purge.
Gar Saxon	Voice: Ray Stevenson (The Clone Wars and Rebels)
Gar Saxon	Mandalorian super commando who served under Darth Maul. He aided Maul's escape from Darth Sidious and commanded his forces during the Siege of Mandalore, until Maul betrayed them all and allowed them to be captured by Bo-Katan's warriors. Following the Galactic Empire's takeover of Mandalore, Saxon became Imperial Viceroy and Governor, wiping out the protectors, but was ultimately defeated by Sabine Wren and killed by Ursa Wren
Tiber Saxon	Voice: Tobias Menzies (Rebels)
Tiber Saxon	Governor of Mandalore and brother of Gar Saxon, whom he succeeded as Imperial Viceroy of Mandalore after his death. During the civil war between the Mandalorian resistance and the Imperial government of Mandalore, Tiber deployed the Arc Pulse Generator, a weapon designed by Sabine Wren, whom he captured and forced to finish the weapon. Eventually, Sabine destroyed the weapon with the Darksaber, causing an explosion that killed Saxon.
Paz Vizsla	Tait Fletcher (The Mandalorian and The Book of Boba Fett) Voice: Jon Favreau (The Mandalorian and The Book of Boba Fett)
Paz Vizsla	Physically imposing Mandalorian warrior and member of the Tribe, who holds a grudge against the Empire due to their purge against the Mandalorian people. He was also a member of both House and Clan Vizsla. While he was initially at odds with Din Djarin because he accepted a mission from a remnant of the Empire led by Moff Gideon, he later assisted in his rescue of "The Child" from said remnant. However, this allowed Gideon to find the Tribe's hideout and massacre most of its members. Vizsla was among the survivors, as his armor was not seen among those of the fallen Mandalorian warriors. He and the Armorer were able to relocate themselves to Glavis. There, they reunited with Djarin. Vizsla attempted to reclaim the Darksaber for his house and clan, but was defeated by Djarin. By the time Djarin became an apostate, he adopted a son named Ragnar. He perished in battle while giving his allies, including Bo-Katan Kryze, time to escape Moff Gideon's forces.
Pre Vizsla	Voice: Jon Favreau (The Clone Wars)
Pre Vizsla	Mandalorian warrior and the leader of the Death Watch during the Clone Wars. Formerly the Governor of Concordia, one of Mandalore's moons, he secretly sided with Count Dooku during the Clone Wars and longed to restore the warrior heritage of Mandalore by overthrowing its pacifist government led by Duchess Satine. His many attempts to do so failed and he eventually broke ties with the CIS. Vizsla later allied himself with the Sith Lords Darth Maul and Savage Oppress, and together they recruited the Black Sun, Pyke Syndicate, and Hutt Clan to form a criminal alliance known as the Shadow Collective. After Vizsla ousted Duchess Satine with the help of the collective, he betrayed his allies (except the Death Watch) and had them imprisoned. Later, Maul escaped and challenged Vizla to a duel to determine who shall rule Mandalore. Vizsla accepted, but was ultimately no match for the former Sith Lord, who executed him and took over Mandalore and the Death Watch.
Tarre Vizsla	—N/a
Tarre Vizsla	First Mandalorian to be inducted into the Jedi Order and creator of the Darksaber, which he used to lead his people and become ruler of Mandalore.
Axe Woves	Simon Kassianides (The Mandalorian)
Axe Woves	Male Mandalorian warrior who accompanied Bo-Katan on her quest to reunite survivors of the Great Mandalorian Purge.
Alrich Wren	Voice: Cary-Hiroyuki Tagawa (Rebels)
Alrich Wren	Mandalorian artist, husband of Ursa Wren and father of Sabine and Tristan Wren. He was made a captive of Gar Saxon, but was rescued by his family and the rebels.
Sabine Wren	Natasha Liu Bordizzo (Ahsoka) Voice: Tiya Sircar (Rebels and Forces of Destiny)
Sabine Wren	Sixteen-year-old Mandalorian graffiti artist, Imperial Academy dropout, former bounty hunter and the Ghost crew's weapons expert.
Tristan Wren	Voice: Ritesh Rajan (Rebels and Forces of Destiny)
Tristan Wren	Mandalorian warrior and brother of Sabine Wren. After his sister deserted the Imperial Academy, he was forced to join the Imperial Super Commandos to prove Clan Wren's loyalty to the Empire. He reunited with Sabine when she returned to persuade Clan Wren to aid the rebellion. When Gar Saxon betrayed Clan Wren and prepared to destroy them, Tristan sided with his family and the rebels, and later fought alongside them in the Mandalorian Civil War.
Ursa Wren	Voice: Sharmila Devar (The Clone Wars and Rebels)
Ursa Wren	Countess of Clan Wren and mother of Sabine Wren. Prior to the Empire's occupation of Mandalore, she participated in the Siege of Mandalore under the command of Bo-Katan Kryze. When Sabine fled the Imperial Academy and spoke out against the Empire, Ursa and the rest of her family sided with the Empire instead. Years later, Sabine returned to her homeworld of Krownest accompanied by Kanan Jarrus, Ezra Bridger, and Fenn Rau, hoping to recruit Clan Wren to the rebel cause and unite Mandalore. Ursa made a deal with Gar Saxon in which she would hand over the Jedi if he promised to spare Sabine's life. She later sided with her daughter after being betrayed by Saxon, whom she killed, and then led Clan Wren in the ensuing Mandalorian Civil War.

== Mandalorian language ==
The Mandalorian language script as created for Attack of the Clones

The written form of the Mandalorian language, created by Philip Metschan for the display screens of Jango Fett's ship, the Slave I, in Attack of the Clones, later re-appeared in The Clone Wars and Rebels. Composer Jesse Harlin, needing lyrics for the choral work he wanted for the 2005 Republic Commando video game, invented a spoken form, intending it to represent an ancient language. It was named Mando'a and extensively expanded by Karen Traviss, author of the Republic Commando novel series.

Mando'a is a primarily spoken, agglutinative language that lacks grammatical gender in its nouns and pronouns. The language is also characterized as lacking a passive voice, instead primarily using the active voice. It is also described as having only three grammatical tenses—present, past, and future—but it is said to be often vague and its speakers typically do not use tenses other than the present. The language is described as having a mutually intelligible dialect called Concordian spoken on the planet Concord Dawn, as stated in Traviss' novels Order 66 and 501st, and a dialect spoken on Mandalore's moon Concordia is heard in "The Mandalore Plot", a season-two episode of The Clone Wars.
