= Chapter 9: The Marshal =

- The Mandalorian episode
- Episode no.: Season 2 Episode 1
- Directed by: Jon Favreau
- Written by: Jon Favreau
- Cinematography by: Barry "Baz" Idoine
- Editing by: Adam Gerstel
- Original release date: October 30, 2020
- Running time: 50 minutes

Co-starring
- John Leguizamo as the voice of Gor Koresh; Amy Sedaris as Peli Motto; Timothy Olyphant as Cobb Vanth; Temuera Morrison as Boba Fett (Note: Upon the episode's airing, Morrison's role was not officially confirmed. "Chapter 14: The Tragedy" confirmed Morrison as Fett.)

Episode chronology
← Previous "Chapter 8: Redemption"	Next → "Chapter 10: The Passenger"
- The Mandalorian season 2

"Chapter 9: The Marshal" is the first episode of the second season of the American streaming television series The Mandalorian. It was written and directed by the series' showrunner Jon Favreau and released on Disney+ on October 30, 2020. The episode stars Pedro Pascal as the Mandalorian, a lone bounty hunter on the run with "the Child", in search of other Mandalorians to help him return the Child to his people. The episode was critically acclaimed, with praise for the performances (particularly Olyphant's) and Favreau's writing and direction.

== Plot ==
Seeking other Mandalorians to help him reunite the Child with its kind, the Mandalorian approaches gangster Gor Koresh, who attempts to kill him for his beskar armor but fails. Under interrogation, he reveals that a Mandalorian has been seen in the town of Mos Pelgo on Tatooine. Returning to Tatooine, the Mandalorian is reunited with mechanic Peli Motto. Although she thought that Mos Pelgo had been destroyed, her droid R5-D4 shows them an old map.

The Mandalorian finds Mos Pelgo and confronts the town's marshal, Cobb Vanth, who is wearing dark green Mandalorian armor. (Note: This is confirmed as Boba Fett's armor, in "Chapter 14: The Tragedy".) Vanth reveals that he is not a Mandalorian but bought the armor from Jawas and then used it to fight off the Mining Collective that overtook the town after the collapse of the Empire. After Vanth and the Mandalorian witness a Krayt Dragon eating the town's livestock, Vanth agrees to give up the armor, if the Mandalorian helps kill the dragon.

On the way to the dragon's lair, Vanth and the Mandalorian encounter a tribe of Tusken Raiders, who agree to help them kill the dragon. The Mandalorian volunteers the Mos Pelgo townspeople as reinforcements. Vanth and the Mandalorian convince the townsfolk to work with the Tuskens, who agree not to attack the town in exchange for the dragon's carcass.

Together, the Tuskens and the townsfolk bury explosives in front of the cave, planning to lure the dragon out and detonate them beneath its vulnerable belly. The dragon survives the explosion and spews acid at them, inflicting heavy casualties. The Mandalorian baits the dragon into swallowing him and a bantha loaded with explosives. He escapes from inside the dragon and detonates the explosives, successfully killing it.

The Tuskens butcher the carcass and recover a valuable pearl. Vanth relinquishes the armor as promised, and the Mandalorian leaves on friendly terms. Meanwhile, a heavily scarred figure watches from afar.

== Production ==
=== Development ===
The episode was written and directed by the series' creator Jon Favreau, marking his directorial debut in the series. Favreau wrote a majority of season one episodes, but could not direct any due to schedule conflicts with The Lion King (2019). The character of Cobb Vanth was first featured in the Star Wars: Aftermath novel trilogy, published between 2015 and 2017. Chuck Wendig, the trilogy's author, was unaware of Vanth's appearance in the episode and only became aware after receiving some direct messages and emails which notified him about it.

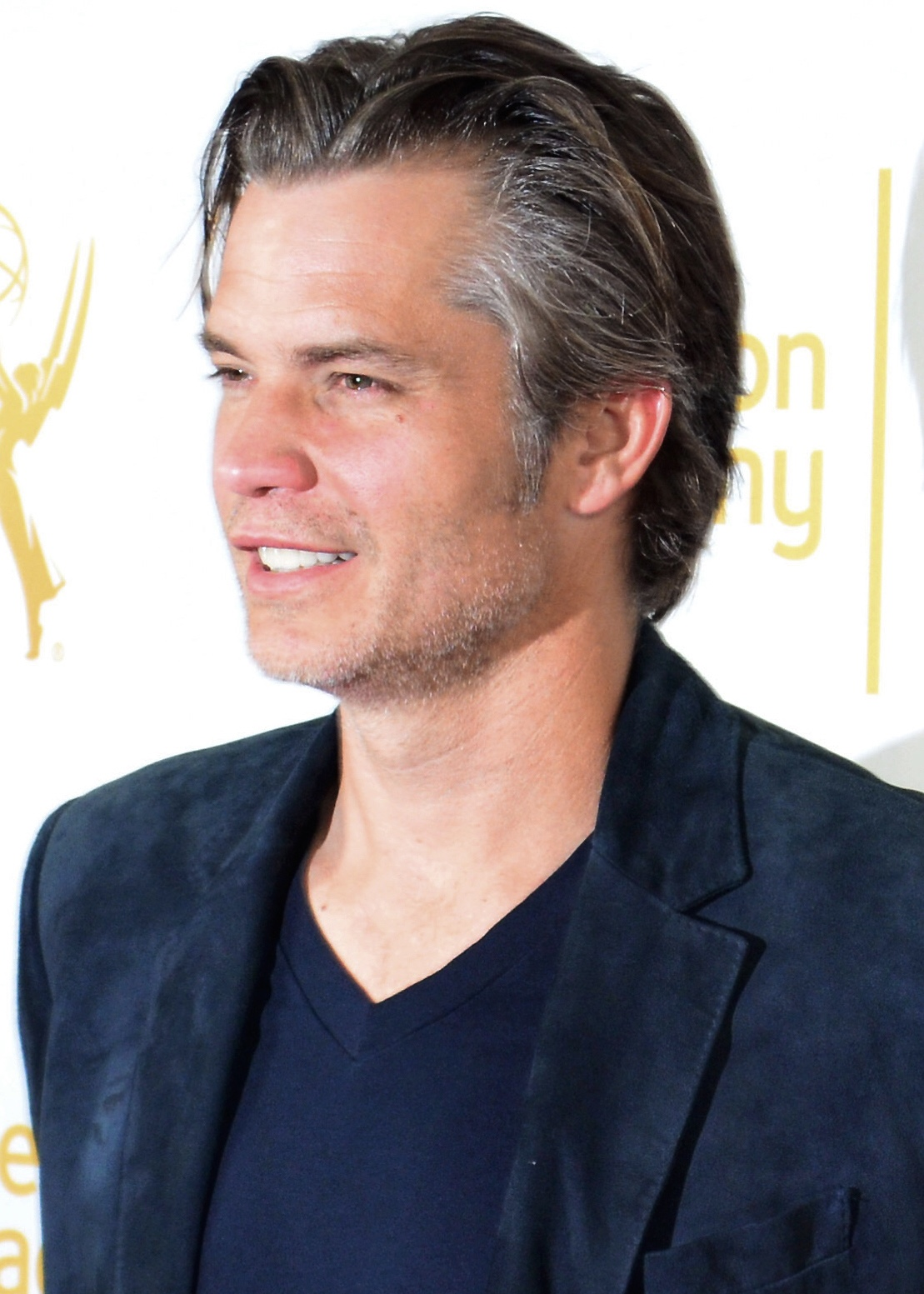
Timothy Olyphant portrays Cobb Vanth in the episode.

=== Casting ===
The co-starring actors cast for this episode are John Leguizamo as the voice of Gor Koresh, Amy Sedaris returning as Peli Motto, Timothy Olyphant as Cobb Vanth, and Temuera Morrison as Boba Fett. Additional guest starring actors cast for this episode include Isaac C. Singleton Jr. as a Twi'lek doorman, David Choe as a ringside spectator, Miguel A. Lopez and Xavier Jimenez as Tusken Raiders, Leilani Shui as a Jawa, W. Earl Brown as a Weequay proprietor, Dietrich Gray as a villager of Mos Pelgo, Karisma Gideon as Jo, and Dylan Curtis as a boy from Mos Pelgo. Choe also provided the graffiti which appear in the episode. Barry Lowin, Brendan Wayne and Lateef Crowder are credited as stunt doubles for the Mandalorian. Paul Darnell is credited as a stunt double for Cobb Vanth, while Legacy Effects supervisor John Rosengrant is credited as a performance artist for Gor Koresh. "The Child" was performed by various puppeteers.

=== Music ===
Ludwig Göransson composed the musical score for the episode. The featured tracks were released on November 20, 2020, in the first volume of the season two soundtrack.

=== Presentation ===
The majority of the episode is shown in a 2.39:1 aspect ratio, while the krayt dragon fight at the end of the episode was expanded to a 1.78:1(16:9) aspect ratio, similar to IMAX format.

== Reception ==
"Chapter 9: The Marshal" received critical acclaim. On Rotten Tomatoes, the episode received an approval rating of 95% based on reviews from 81 critics, with an average rating of 8.1/10. The website's critics consensus reads, "With surprising twists, delightful turns, and tons of turbo-loaded action, "The Marshal" is a spectacular return for The Mandalorian that doesn't skimp on the Baby Yoda."

Nick Allen of RogerEbert.com praised the krayt dragon action sequence and Ludwig Göransson's score. Dan Fienberg of The Hollywood Reporter was concerned that season 2 of the show might become bloated or spoiled in some way by its success, but concluded, "The result was, for a little show, easily its biggest and perhaps most purely entertaining episode to date."

Ben Lindbergh of The Ringer criticized the episode's similarity to previous episodes and stated that the episode "resembled a blend of the mostly monster-of-the-week episodes in the middle of last season, which didn't shed a lot of light on the overarching plot."
