= Chapter 14: The Tragedy =

- The Mandalorian episode
- Promotional poster featuring co-star Temuera Morrison as Boba Fett. Critics highlighted the character's return as one of the main highlights of the episode.
- Episode no.: Season 2 Episode 6
- Directed by: Robert Rodriguez
- Written by: Jon Favreau
- Cinematography by: David Klein
- Editing by: Andrew S. Eisen
- Original release date: December 4, 2020
- Running time: 30 minutes

Co-starring
- Temuera Morrison as Boba Fett; Ming-Na Wen as Fennec Shand; Giancarlo Esposito as Moff Gideon; Gina Carano as Cara Dune

Episode chronology
← Previous "Chapter 13: The Jedi"	Next → "Chapter 15: The Believer"
- The Mandalorian season 2

"Chapter 14: The Tragedy" is the sixth episode of the second season of the American streaming television series The Mandalorian. It was written by showrunner Jon Favreau and directed by Robert Rodriguez. It was released on Disney+ on December 4, 2020. The episode received critical acclaim, with praise towards Rodriguez's direction, action sequences, emotional weight, and the return of Temuera Morrison as Boba Fett.

== Plot ==
The Mandalorian arrives with Grogu on Tython, and finds the ancient temple on top of a mountain. He seats Grogu at the center so that he may choose his path. Grogu meditates, and a protective Force field appears around him. Boba Fett arrives with the mercenary Fennec Shand, whose life he saved on Tatooine, (Note: As depicted in the season 1 episode "Chapter 5: The Gunslinger" (2019).) and demands the return of his Mandalorian armor. (Note: The Mandalorian confiscated the armor from Cobb Vanth in "Chapter 9: The Marshal".) Following a tense confrontation, the Mandalorian agrees to trade the armor for the safety of Grogu. Two Imperial troop carriers arrive, carrying stormtroopers who attempt to capture Grogu. Honoring their agreement, Fett, Shand, and the Mandalorian join forces to fend off the advancing stormtroopers, inflicting heavy casualties. Boba Fett retrieves his armor and uses it to wipe out many stormtroopers before firing a rocket that destroys the fleeing troop ships. As the Force field surrounding him disappears, Grogu collapses from exhaustion.

Moff Gideon arrives in an Imperial light cruiser and destroys the Mandalorian's ship Razor Crest from high overhead. Gideon sends out four Dark Troopers, who capture Grogu and take him back to the cruiser. Fett and Shand agree to help the Mandalorian save Grogu to honor their debt. The Mandalorian seeks the now New Republic Marshal Cara Dune's help in breaking out the criminal Mayfeld to help track Gideon and rescue Grogu. Impressed with the Force powers Grogu exhibits against stormtroopers, Moff Gideon shows Grogu the Darksaber and has a stormtrooper stun and shackle him. After, Gideon informs Dr. Pershing that they have the donor.

== Production ==
=== Development ===
The episode was written by the series' creator Jon Favreau and directed by Robert Rodriguez, whose involvement in the second season was confirmed on May 4, 2020. Rodriguez was not the first choice to direct the episode. Before directing The Mandalorian, Rodriguez worked with Pedro Pascal on the Netflix film We Can Be Heroes. Rodriguez was surprised at the short length of the script and asked Favreau "Is it okay that my script is only 19 pages? Because I cut really fast and it's probably going to end up being 16 minutes" but Favreau explained that Rodriguez was there to fill out the action scenes and make the battle longer. He praised the script saying "It had all the good stuff in it. It was like a 'Greatest Hits' of all the good stuff; I couldn't believe it. To go play in Star Wars with all the toys and to get to play with Boba Fett." Not knowing if Boba Fett would be appearing in the series again, Rodriguez took the opportunity to "make him super badass in this moment [and] be that character that I imagined him being when I heard about him when I was 12. That was my mission, just to go satisfy that 12-year-old fascination with the character." Rodriguez described the experience: "it's fulfilled all my... it's beyond my expectations, I mean, it was SO fun".

Only six of the stormtroopers were real, the others were digitally added to the scene.

=== Casting ===
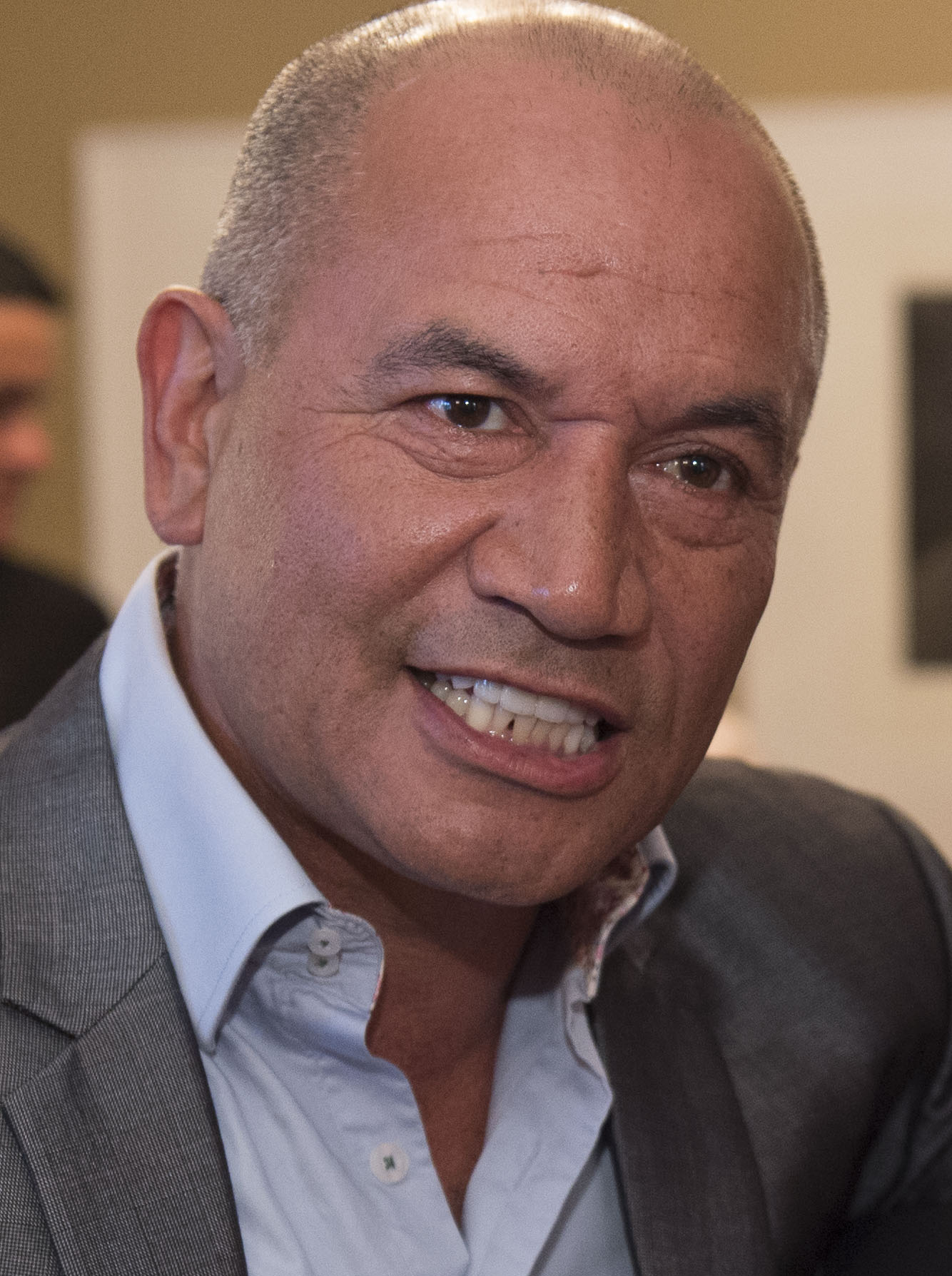
Temuera Morrison portrays Boba Fett in the episode.

The co-starring actors cast for this episode are all returning from previous episodes, and include Temuera Morrison as Boba Fett, Ming-Na Wen as Fennec Shand, Giancarlo Esposito as Moff Gideon, and Gina Carano as Cara Dune. Additional guest starring actors cast for this episode include Gabriel Ebert as an Imperial Gunner Officer and Katy O'Brian returning as an Imperial Comms Officer. Brendan Wayne, Lateef Crowder, and Barry Lowin are credited as stunt doubles for the Mandalorian. Kirk Jenkins and Lauren Kim are credited as stunt doubles for Boba Fett and Fennec Shand, respectively. Grogu was performed by various puppeteers.

=== Music ===
Ludwig Göransson composed the musical score for the episode. The featured tracks were released on December 18, 2020, in the second volume of the season two soundtrack.

Göransson and Rodriguez had music sessions over Zoom where they played with raw sound effects to develop a guide for what would become Boba Fett's theme. Rodriguez wanted Fett to be primal, like a barbarian, and included a war horn, which Göransson took inspiration from and distorted that sound with a didgeridoo and another unique sound. Göransson also added breathing sounds to the track "to make it feel like he's in your head".

== Reception ==
On Rotten Tomatoes, the episode received an approval rating of 100% based on reviews from 45 critics, with an average rating of 8.7/10. The site's critics consensus reads: "Thrilling, confident, and utterly heartbreaking, "The Tragedy" is breathtaking television brilliantly realized by director Robert Rodriguez."

IGN's Laura Prudom gave the episode 10 out of 10, calling it "action-packed, mythology-heavy, and emotionally stirring" and praised Robert Rodriguez for his confident direction and eye for action. Keith Phipps of Vulture gave the episode four out of five stars, praising Boba Fett's characterization and calling the action sequence between Fett, Shand, and the stormtroopers "spectacular" and "smartly choreographed". Alan Sepinwall of Rolling Stone called it "a thrilling episode, and a lovely but rare instance of fact and legend finally merging into the same thing."
