= Vanth (disambiguation) =

Vanth is an etruscan mythology figure.

Vanth may also refer to:

- Vanth (moon), a moon of dwarf planet Orcus (former designation Orcus l)
- Cobb Vanth, a Star Wars character
