= Cara Dune =

Star Wars character

- Star Wars character
- Gina Carano as Cara Dune in The Mandalorian
- First appearance: "Chapter 4: Sanctuary"; The Mandalorian; (2019)
- Last appearance: "Chapter 16: The Rescue"; The Mandalorian; (2020)
- Created by: Jon Favreau
- Portrayed by: Gina Carano

In-universe information
- Full name: Carasynthia Dune
- Occupation: Marshal of Nevarro (former); Mercenary (former); Shock trooper (former)
- Affiliation: New Republic; Rebel Alliance (former)
- Homeworld: Alderaan

Cara Dune is a fictional character in the Star Wars franchise, appearing in the first two seasons of the Disney+ television series The Mandalorian. Portrayed by actress and mixed martial artist Gina Carano, the character is a former Rebel shock trooper who became a mercenary after the Galactic Civil War, and is later employed as a marshal of the New Republic. A highly trained and battle-hardened special forces warrior, Cara is skilled in the use of weaponry, hand-to-hand combat, and battle tactics, and has an intense hatred of the Galactic Empire for its destruction of her homeworld, Alderaan. Carano described Cara as a loner who is having trouble readjusting to society following her career as a soldier.

In February 2021, following a series of controversial posts by Carano on social media, Lucasfilm announced that she would not return as Cara and that the character would not be recast.

== Appearances ==
=== Backstory ===
In the first-season finale, Cara's full given name is revealed to be Carasynthia, and her homeworld to be Alderaan, the planet destroyed by the Death Star in the first Star Wars (1977) film. She is a former shock trooper from the Rebel Alliance, who fought against the Galactic Empire in the Galactic Civil War depicted in the original Star Wars trilogy, and helped establish the New Republic following that conflict. In exposition from The Mandalorian, Cara reveals that most of her past work as a Rebel soldier involved eliminating Imperial warlords and other remnants of the Empire following the destruction of the second Death Star. As a shock trooper, she was dropped behind enemy lines with no support to cause as much damage as possible. The dialogue also establishes that she left the Alliance after her role shifted to a more political "peacekeeping" role, such as protecting delegates and suppressing riots, which Cara said was "not what I signed up for". After taking what she calls "early retirement" from her military position, she became a mercenary, and began drifting from planet to planet. She eventually became wanted for unknown reasons, leading her to hide out on the forest planet of Sorgan.

=== Season 1 ===
Cara made her first appearance in "Chapter 4: Sanctuary", the fourth episode of The Mandalorian. On the planet Sorgan, she meets the show's title character, a bounty hunter known simply as the Mandalorian, and each wrongly believes the other one was attempting to collect a bounty on each other. This results in the two briefly engaging in hand-to-hand combat during their first encounter, ending in a stalemate. They reconcile and ultimately join forces to defend a village against a ravaging band of raiders of the Klatooinian species. Cara and the Mandalorian help prepare defensive obstacles and protective positions throughout the village, as well as train the villagers for combat. Lacking sufficient weapons to take down the raiders' AT-ST, they develop a plan to use the environment of the village, digging ponds deep enough for the walker to collapse after stepping into them. These measures prove effective during the battle, but when the AT-ST fails to advance far enough to fall into the pond traps, Cara successfully lures it forward by leaping into the pond herself and attacking it at close range. When the walker moves forward to target her and becomes stuck, the Mandalorian destroys it with a thermal detonator. After the battle, Cara saves the life of Grogu, aka "The Child", a young alien creature under the Mandalorian's protection, when she finds and kills a bounty hunter just before it is about to execute Grogu. As a result, the Mandalorian realizes he must take Grogu away from Sorgan, and he invites Cara to come along with them, but she declines.

Cara reappears in "Chapter 7: The Reckoning", when the Mandalorian recruits her for a mission to the planet Nevarro to eliminate an Imperial presence there. When he first finds her, she is participating in fights with challengers for money. Cara is initially reluctant to leave Sorgan, but when the Mandalorian explains that the targets are Imperials, she immediately agrees. While traveling to Nevarro on the Mandalorian's ship, she participates in a friendly arm wrestling match with him, but Grogu mistakes her actions as aggressive and uses the Force to choke her, only stopping after the Mandalorian intervenes. During their journey, Cara and the Mandalorian's party are attacked by a group of pterodactyl-like creatures, which they repel after taking casualties. The bounty hunter Greef Karga is critically injured and Cara attempts to apply first aid, but Grogu uses the Force to heal him.

Later, Greef reveals the mission is an ambush, after which the Mandalorian is to be killed and Grogu given over to the Imperials. Cara, the Mandalorian, and Greef instead devise a new plan: they will leave Grogu behind, bring the Mandalorian to the Imperials as if he is a prisoner, and then eliminate them. The plan goes wrong, resulting in the trio becoming pinned down inside a cantina by Imperial officer Moff Gideon and his stormtroopers. At the start of the first-season finale "Chapter 8: Redemption", the group engages in a brief gunfight with the stormtroopers after IG-11, the bounty hunter droid, arrives with Grogu to provide assistance. The Mandalorian is badly injured during the fight, and Cara drags him back into the cantina to safety. The group escapes the building via the sewer system, and flee on a droid-controlled floating barge on a river of lava. Cara is present when IG-11 sacrifices himself to eliminate a large number of stormtroopers to ensure the group's escape, and she survives an attack by Moff Gideon in a TIE fighter, which the Mandalorian repels. Afterward, Cara decides to stay on Nevarro to help eliminate any remaining Imperial presence on the planet, and Greef invites her to work as his enforcer, which she appears to accept.

=== Season 2 ===
The character was confirmed to return for the second season of The Mandalorian ahead of its premiere. She appears in "Chapter 12: The Siege", as the marshal of Nevarro and working with Greef to eliminate the remaining Imperial forces on Nevarro. When the Mandalorian and Grogu return to Nevarro for repairs to the Razor Crest, they ask him to help them destroy the last Imperial base on the planet in exchange for the repairs. The base turns out to have more than just a skeleton crew, as the group finds numerous stormtroopers patrolling its corridors. They deactivate the lava cooling system so that the natural lava flows will destroy the base. During their escape, the group finds scientists and vats of what appear to be cloned bodies. The scientists attempt to destroy the evidence, but they uncover a recording from Dr. Pershing that reveals he had been transfusing Grogu's blood, which has a high 'M-count', into test subjects. Stormtroopers soon swarm the team and they are forced to escape before the lava overheats and destroys the base.

The Mandalorian flies from the base to retrieve his ship, using his jetpack, while Cara and the others escape in a stormtrooper transport. A chase ensues between the transport, driven by Cara, and scout troopers riding speeder bikes. Greef kills the last scout trooper, but TIE fighters launched from the base chase after them, disabling the transport's cannon. The base soon explodes due to the overheating of the lava. As the TIE fighters close in on Cara, Greef, and Mythrol, the Razor Crest appears and destroys the Imperials. After the Mandalorian departs, Greef is visited by New Republic pilots to invite him to help stop whatever the Empire is planning. One of the pilots, Captain Carson Teva, speaks with Cara and makes her the same offer, mentioning Alderaan's destruction by the Empire, to which she replies that she lost everything with it.

In "Chapter 14: The Tragedy", the Mandalorian returns to Nevarro to find Cara to be serving as a Marshal for the New Republic. He requests her assistance in recovering the Child who has been kidnapped by Gideon's forces. In the following episode, "Chapter 15: The Believer", Cara can secure the release of the prisoner Migs Mayfeld to assist the Mandalorian in a mission to infiltrate an imperial base and locate Moff Gideon. Cara joins the mission, acting as a sniper alongside Fennec Shand. After the mission, she agrees to let Mayfeld go free and assures him he will be declared dead.

In "Chapter 16: The Rescue", Cara helps the Mandalorian and his allies intercept Dr. Pershing's transport, during which one of the ship's pilots taunts Cara about the destruction of Alderaan before being shot dead. She later teams up with Fennec, Bo-Katan Kryze, and Koska Reeves to take over the bridge of Moff Gideon's cruiser as a distraction while the Mandalorian rescues Grogu and defeats Gideon. When Luke Skywalker arrives, Cara prevents the captured Gideon from completing a suicide attempt and knocks him unconscious.

=== Season 3 ===
Cara does not appear in season 3, but is briefly mentioned in "Chapter 17: The Apostate" by Greef Karga that she is no longer serving as marshal of Nevarro as she was recruited by New Republic Special Forces after handing in Moff Gideon.

=== Other media ===
Cara Dune appears as an unlockable character in the mobile role-playing game Star Wars: Galaxy of Heroes.

== Characterization ==
Cara Dune is a battle-hardened warrior, with a muscular build giving her far greater strength and durability compared to other heroines of the saga with a tough and aggressive personality, but also a kindness beneath her gruff exterior. Gina Carano, the actress and former mixed martial artist who plays the character, said Cara and the Mandalorian are similar in personality and background, and that the two understand each other and were able to form a bond as a result. A highly trained fighter, she is muscular, an extremely accurate shot, and has excellent hand-to-hand combat skills, as shown immediately in her fight with the Mandalorian when Cara is first introduced. She is one of the few in the show who is able to match the Mandalorian in direct combat.

Carano called Cara "a bit of a loner", who is having trouble reintegrating herself into society following her combat experience. The fact that she mistakes the Mandalorian for attempting to collect a bounty on her during their first meeting indicates she has done some unsavory things since leaving the military; Carano said of this: "I feel like she's always in trouble." As a soldier, Cara enjoyed the adrenaline of war, and when that disappeared during peacetime, she found herself disillusioned with her new role. Carano has said Cara is questioning whether she agreed with everything that occurred during her military service, and that her experiences at war taken a psychological toll on her. When introduced in The Mandalorian, Cara kept to herself, did not easily trust others, and cared about little except her survival, keeping her skills sharp, and killing Imperials. However, she also has a strong sense of loyalty, as shown by her refusal to abandon the Mandalorian after he is seriously injured in the first-season finale. Cara has an intense hatred for the Empire, which is driven in large part by its role in the destruction of her home planet of Alderaan.

The Angry Staff Officer, an anonymous Army National Guard officer who writes for Wired magazine, has called Cara one of the more tactically-proficient characters in Star Wars. He called Cara perhaps "the one person in the Star Wars universe to actually absorb some lessons learned" from her past combat engagements. The writer described the defensive measure the Mandalorian and Cara develop to protect the village in "Chapter 4: Sanctuary" as a "near-perfect defensive engagement", and praised Cara's efforts in luring the AT-ST into a vulnerable position, as well as the way she and the villagers quickly identified their priorities of work, such as establishing obstacles, building protective positions, and training the villagers to fight. In another example, he cited a scene in the first-season finale in which Cara assists an injured Mandalorian by dragging him into cover for assessment while providing covering fire. He said other Star Wars characters in this situation have simply tended to the victim in the middle of the firefight, a dangerous scenario, while Cara's method is the safer method recommended by the United States Armed Forces. He wrote: "Cara Dune would receive a 'go' for all the performance measures for this U.S. Army medical task."

== Concept and creation ==
=== Conception ===
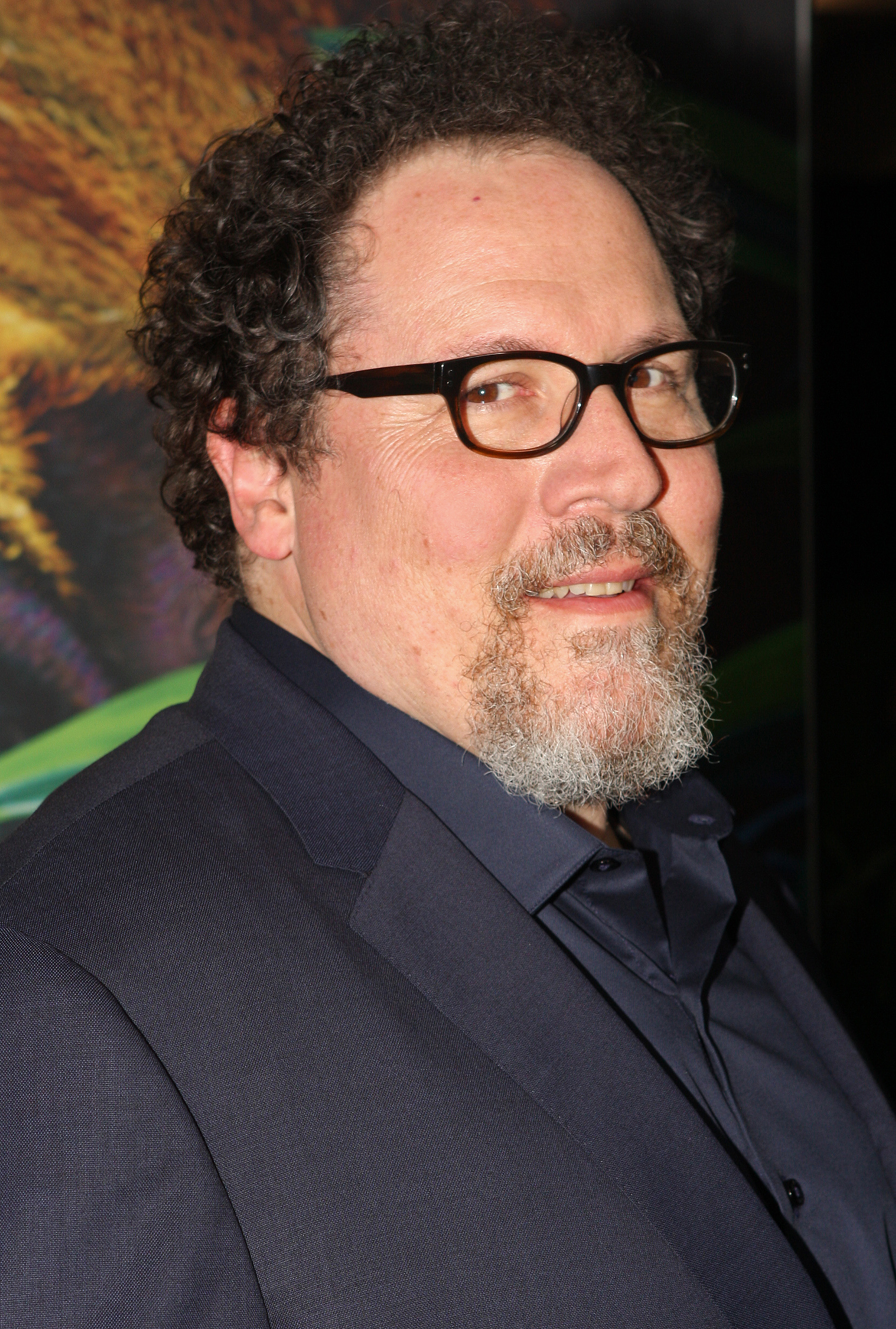
Cara Dune was conceived by Jon Favreau, the creator and showrunner of The Mandalorian.

The character of Cara Dune was conceived by Jon Favreau, the creator and showrunner of The Mandalorian. According to Carano, Favreau created the character with Carano specifically in mind and did not audition any other actresses for the part. Carano said Favreau sought to make a strong and independent character, but one different from Princess Leia or other powerful female characters previously featured in the franchise: "He wanted my character to be this new soldier of women, and he wanted her to have an impact". Favreau said it was the type of character he always wished to portray as an actor himself, describing her as "raising the stakes and raising hell". The writers checked with executive producer Dave Filoni, who had been involved in past Star Wars works, to make sure the Rebel shock trooper position was consistent with the past continuity of the franchise. False rumors had circulated on the Internet about what type of character Cara would be before any official announcements about her were made public.

Cara Dune was first publicly unveiled during the Star Wars Celebration convention in Chicago on April 14, 2019, along with the character Greef Karga. The event also featured teaser footage with Cara, a still photo of the character, and included a panel discussion with Carano and Carl Weathers, the actor who portrays Greef, talking about their characters. Cara was subsequently featured prominently in posters, commercials, and marketing materials in advance of the release of The Mandalorian. On September 4, Entertainment Weekly unveiled an exclusive photo of Cara and the Mandalorian fighting together, and on October 28, a character poster of The Mandalorian solely featuring Cara Dune was released.

=== Portrayal ===
Carano's casting was first announced on December 12, 2018, though the news had been leaked on the Internet before the formal announcement. The production of The Mandalorian called for more secrecy than any other job of Carano's career. Prior to filming one of Cara's first scenes, Carano said Favreau told her that playing this character was going to change Carano's career trajectory, giving her more self-confidence as an actress providing her the opportunity to play stronger roles in the future. Carano said she had a strong positive emotional reaction to the conversation, and that it helped her play the role of Cara Dune more confidently, saying: "I feel like my whole life since I shot that has been a different world." Carano credited Bryce Dallas Howard, who directed the first episode featuring Cara, with helping Carano determine how to best translate the character from the script to the screen during their work together in Cara's debut episode.

In February 2021, Lucasfilm announced that Carano would no longer portray the character, citing social media posts which they said "denigrat[ed] people based on their cultural and religious identities", and that the character would not be recast. Lucasfilm subsequently included the character on a "For Your Consideration" poster for the Emmy Awards.

=== Costume ===
Cara Dune's costume was designed by concept artist Brian Matyas and costume designer Joseph Porro. Gina Carano said she was impressed by the amount of detail the crew of The Mandalorian achieved in their costuming, saying of them: "These people are legit." The costume is mostly black, with armor pieces on the chest and shoulders showing wear from battle damage, and Three lines with black and silver bars running across the sternum. The costume includes two thick belts, one black and one green, as well as holsters for blasters and knives, and a brace on the right knee. The costume also includes thick black gloves with metal on the fingers and knuckles, as well as wrist armor and large black boots.

The creation of Cara's costume began with a mold being made of Carano's body, a process she did not enjoy. The shoulders were built out and the waist cinched in, to create a distinctive hourglass-shaped silhouette for the character. The Mandalorian executive producer Kathleen Kennedy had stressed the importance of Cara having a distinctive silhouette because she felt all Star Wars characters should be recognizable from a great distance. Jon Favreau, Bryce Dallas Howard, and Dave Filoni provided input on the costume, with Howard, in particular, making suggestions about how to convey toughness without sacrificing femininity, while also ensuring Carano would be able to perform the athletic feats required of the character. Carano stressed the importance of this: "How do you put basically football padding on a busty curvy female? I didn't want to be a block. I didn't want to just be this like big, buff refrigerator."

Cara's hairstyle was originally planned to be short, with one side completely buzzed, but Carano objected to this because she wanted to maintain the character's femininity. Maria Sandoval, who described Cara as her favorite character on the show, instead developed a shoulder-length hairstyle with rough edges. The hairstyle was partially inspired by that of director Deborah Chow, who had directed several The Mandalorian first-season episodes. Howard said while she and the producers of the series were discussing Cara's costume, they observed Chow directing and noticed the way her hair was gathered and stylized with braids, and elements of it were factored into Cara Dune's hairstyle. Cara was provided a blaster prop similar in appearance to the firearm used by Han Solo in the Star Wars films. The character also has a handful of tattoos, including a small Rebel Alliance insignia under the left eye, and a series of tattoos and bars around her that signify her as a veteran of the Rebellion, something that had been featured on characters on the animated television series Star Wars: The Clone Wars. Carano said the Rebel insignia tattoo, in particular, has a deeper back story that would be revealed later in future seasons.

The costume was on display at the D23 Expo in Anaheim, California in August 2019.

=== Filming ===
Cara Dune's scenes were filmed in a studio in Manhattan Beach, California. Favreau and Filoni discussed elements of Cara's back story with Carano before filming to help inform her performance, and just before filming the introductory scene of Cara's debut episode, Favreau shared secrets about the character that would not be revealed until later in the series. Carano said having this information helped inform her performance and "added so much depth to what her life has been like". Carano said she enjoyed performing against lead actor Pedro Pascal, who plays the Mandalorian, and other masked characters in the show, and she said it was easy for her to do so because, in her everyday life, "I don't naturally see what somebody's physical appearance is. I instantly kind of feel who a person is"; as a result, she said she could often tell what faces Pascal was making or what emotions he was expressing beneath the mask, despite not seeing his face. Pascal said of working with her: "I couldn't feel in better hands than in the hands of Gina Carano."

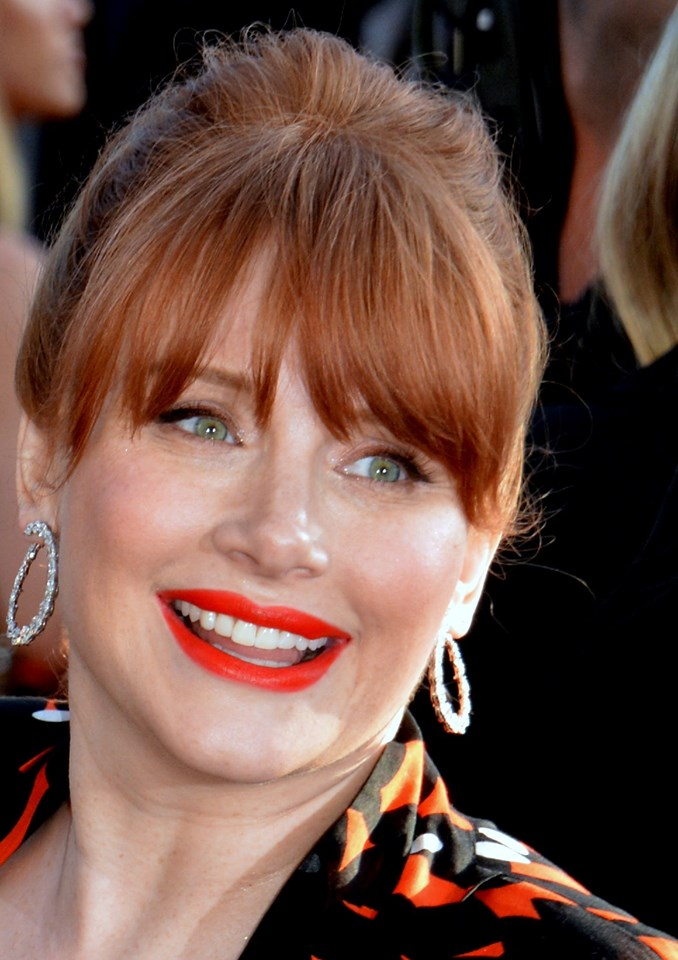
Carano credits Mandalorian director Bryce Dallas Howard (pictured) with helping her find how to best translate the character of Cara Dune from the script to the screen.

Carano said Howard listened to her thoughts and ideas during the filming of Cara's first episode, watched replays with her after shooting scenes, and communicated with her as a fellow actress. Carano said of Howard: "She was very motherly and protective of our performances." Howard also allowed Carano to have as many takes as she needed to get the performance right, which the actress said put her at ease.

During Carano's first day of filming, she was required to ride the mechanical blurrg, a reptilian mounted creature that was so large she needed a ladder to climb atop it. Pascal was unavailable for many of her scenes on "Chapter 4: Sanctuary" because he was auditioning for another series, so Howard mostly worked with Pascal's body double. As a result, she called Carano "the face of the episode". The actress had a stomach flu when her scenes fighting the AT-ST were filmed, which along with two nights of rain in advance of the shoot made the scene very challenging. Her introductory scene in which the Mandalorian and Cara fight each other was originally written differently, but it was changed on the set by Favreau and Howard as the stunt team worked on choreography and previsualization. Carano said one of the changes was "we made it to where she got the jump on him."

Carano said the set of The Mandalorian is "not a green screen set", but rather is very realistic, even with the alien characters and other fantasy elements. She said this helps her performance and has been "an incredible blessing for my imagination". According to Carano, she passed out twice while filming the scene in "Chapter 7: The Reckoning" when Grogu uses the Force to choke her. On March 6, 2020, Carano posted an Instagram photo of herself in the Cara Dune costume on the set of The Mandalorian to mark the end of filming for the second season, writing: "I absolutely love this work and the people in it."

=== Stunts ===
Carano collaborated and worked closely with The Mandalorian stunt team, and she believed they "accepted me as one of their own", in part due to her mixed martial arts background. She said the stunt team "have been like brothers and sisters to me". Carano performed many of the stunts herself. For example, Carano herself drags a wounded comrade off a battlefield during one of her scenes, which surprised many of the bystanders on the set. Carano also outpaced Pascal's stunt double in one scene, and in another, she sent a stunt performer flying across the set due to the force of one of her kicks.

Carano believed her fighting scenes were aided not only by her mixed martial arts skills, but also her training in ballet, jazz dancing, and tap dancing as a child. She said some fighters have trouble transitioning into acting because they want to appear tough and have trouble performing in scenes in which they lose fights or take hits, but Carano said her early arts training helped her avoid that.

== Cultural impact ==
=== Reception ===
Carano said most of the feedback about the character she has heard and read online has been positive, adding: "I have so many people who are rooting for this strong female character." Olivia Luchini of PopSugar called her a character "worthy of riotous applause" and a feminist role model, calling her unique even among the Star Wars franchise's strong female characters due to her physicality and combat skills. Luchini says Cara serves as a role model, particularly for female fans who consider themselves "a little rugged and audacious", writing: "She is a breath of fresh air for those who haven't been able to see themselves in the Star Wars universe quite yet." Megan Crouse of Den of Geek called Cara one of the show's best characters, particularly praising the "great platonic chemistry" between her and the Mandalorian. Crouse said Carano fully inhabits the character that she elevates the script. Variety writer Will Thorne praised Cara Dune, complimenting her combat skills and "debonair charm", and compared her to the Marvel Comics character Gamora as performed by Zoe Saldaña in the Guardians of the Galaxy films.

Vanity Fair writer Joanna Robinson called the character a "prime showcase for Carano" and the first role to capitalize on her "real-life, distinct blend of inherent sweetness and physical toughness". Screen Rant writer Kevin Pantoja called Carano brings a "legitimate physical presence" to the role, and that Cara stands out in a franchise that already includes such strong female protagonists as Princess Leia and Rey. Erik Kain of Forbes called Cara a great character and said he wishes she was featured even more prominently in the series. She ranked fourth on a Screen Rant list of the most interesting characters from the first season of The Mandalorian, fifth on a separate list of the ten best characters from the show, and her costume was ranked third on a list of the ten best costumes in the first season. Several fans have produced artwork of the character and dressed as her in cosplay, and some have gotten the Rebel Alliance tattoo that Cara has under her eye.

According to Anthony Gramuglia of Comic Book Resources some Star Wars fans were critical of the Cara Dune character because they perceived the presence of a strong female fighter as "forced diversity" and "wokeness". Gramuglia calls these objections "misogynist" and "patently ridiculous", comparing them to complaints about other female Star Wars characters such as Rey, Rose Tico, Jyn Erso and Qi'ra. Gramuglia writes: "To them, Cara Dune's presence serves as a means to make men appear weaker by comparison, as she fights battles that most of the male characters aren't capable of undertaking themselves."

=== Merchandise ===
Several toys of Cara Dune were first made available at a Star Wars product launch event called Triple Force Friday on October 4, 2019. Among them was a six-inch action figure by Hasbro as part of the company's Star Wars: The Black Series toy line, and Funko Pop figurine, and a Lego minifigure, as well as The Mandalorian t-shirts featuring the character.

Additionally, two more action figures based on the character were about to be released, one of which was reported to have been part of The Black Series 6 line, but production on all Cara Dune toys was canceled by Hasbro following Carano's firing.
