= Chapter 16: The Rescue =

- The Mandalorian episode
- Luke Skywalker arrives at the bridge of Moff Gideon's light cruiser to retrieve Grogu.
- Episode no.: Season 2 Episode 8
- Directed by: Peyton Reed
- Written by: Jon Favreau
- Cinematography by: Barry "Baz" Idoine
- Editing by: Adam Gerstel
- Original release date: December 18, 2020
- Running time: 44 minutes

Co-starring
- Omid Abtahi as Dr. Pershing; Temuera Morrison as Boba Fett; Gina Carano as Cara Dune; Mercedes Varnado as Koska Reeves; Katee Sackhoff as Bo-Katan Kryze; Ming-Na Wen as Fennec Shand; Giancarlo Esposito as Moff Gideon; Mark Hamill as Luke Skywalker

Episode chronology
| ← Previous "Chapter 15: The Believer" | Next → "Chapter 17: The Apostate" |
- The Mandalorian season 2

"Chapter 16: The Rescue" is the eighth and final episode of the second season of the American television series The Mandalorian. It was written by showrunner Jon Favreau and directed by Peyton Reed. It was released on Disney+ on December 18, 2020. The episode received strong critical acclaim, in particular for the action sequences, Reed's direction, writing, performances, score, and emotional weight, with the surprise cameo of a digitally de-aged Luke Skywalker being a major highlight among fans.

== Plot ==
The Mandalorian boards an Imperial shuttle with Cara Dune and captures Dr. Pershing. He and Boba Fett then visit Bo-Katan and Koska Reeves, who clash with Fett over the purity of his Mandalorian lineage. (Note: Alluding to the fact that Fett is a genetic clone of his father rather than a biological son, as established in Attack of the Clones.) Bo-Katan agrees to help rescue Grogu from Moff Gideon in exchange for the Darksaber, which Gideon has. Having learned from Dr. Pershing that the cruiser is defended by Dark Trooper droids, Fett deceives the Imperials into allowing the others to crash-land in the cruiser's fighter launch tube. Bo-Katan, Reeves, Fennec, and Dune fight through stormtroopers to the ship's bridge, while the Mandalorian attempts to seal off the Dark Troopers. Although one breaks through, he manages to defeat it after a prolonged struggle using his beskar spear and ejects the others out of the airlock.

Gideon, who is guarding Grogu, tries to bargain with the Mandalorian when confronted, but immediately reneges and attacks the Mandalorian with the Darksaber. The Mandalorian overpowers the Moff and brings him and Grogu to the others on the bridge. Gideon attempts to goad Bo-Katan into attacking the Mandalorian for possession of the Darksaber and a better claim on Mandalore since he won the right to own the weapon in combat. The Dark Troopers return and begin to slowly cut through the bridge's defenses.

A single X-wing lands, piloted by a Jedi Knight who engages and destroys all of the Dark Troopers. Gideon seizes his opportunity and shoots Bo-Katan with a hidden blaster, but the Mandalorian protects Grogu by blocking the shot meant for him; refusing to surrender, Gideon tries to shoot himself but is disarmed by Dune. The Mandalorian, overruling the others' objections, opens the blast doors to the Jedi, who is revealed to be Luke Skywalker. Grogu hesitates to leave with Skywalker until the Mandalorian permits him to go with the Jedi to complete his training. The Mandalorian removes his helmet to allow Grogu to bid a proper goodbye and tearfully looks on as Skywalker, accompanied by R2-D2, departs with him.

In a post-credits scene, Fett and Fennec invade Jabba the Hutt's palace on Tatooine, and kill Bib Fortuna and his guards. (Note: Which sets up the events of The Book of Boba Fett.)

== Production ==
=== Development ===
The episode was written by the series' creator Jon Favreau and directed by Peyton Reed. Reed was announced to be directing for the season on May 4, 2020, Star Wars Day, and while promoting Wonder Woman 1984 (2020), Pascal confirmed that Reed directed the final episode of season two. Favreau said the surprise appearance of Luke Skywalker had not been planned from the start, but that as he wrote the story it became clear that it would be the best way to fit within the established continuity. The post-credits scene reveals The Book of Boba Fett (2021-2022) for release in December 2021. Jeremy Bulloch, who originally played Fett in The Empire Strikes Back (1980) and Return of the Jedi (1983), had died the previous day. The episode later added a dedication to Bulloch.

=== Casting ===
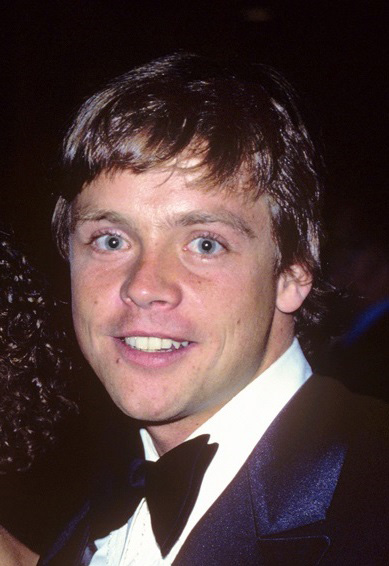
A de-aged digital version of Mark Hamill as Luke Skywalker is featured in the episode.

Mark Hamill guest stars as the famous Jedi Luke Skywalker, reprising his role from the original and sequel trilogies of the Skywalker Saga. Luke, who is twenty-eight at the time of The Mandalorian, appears in the episode through the use of a CGI version of Hamill's de-aged likeness, digitally animated over a body double (played by Max Lloyd-Jones) with the use of motion capture. The technique was previously used in the franchise for the appearance of Grand Moff Tarkin and a young Princess Leia in Rogue One (2016) when a CGI version of Carrie Fisher's face was used. Hamill did not re-record Skywalker's voice. Instead, archive audio recordings of Hamill's voice from the original trilogy and other mediums of the time (such as interviews and audiobooks) were programmed using the software Respeecher. Hamill previously made an uncredited cameo appearance in The Mandalorian when he voiced the droid EV-9D9 in "Chapter 5: The Gunslinger".

The other co-starring actors cast for this episode are all returning from previous episodes, and include Omid Abtahi as Dr. Pershing, Temuera Morrison as Boba Fett, Gina Carano as Cara Dune, Mercedes Varnado as Koska Reeves, Katee Sackhoff as Bo-Katan Kryze, Ming-Na Wen as Fennec Shand, and Giancarlo Esposito as Moff Gideon. Additional guest starring actors cast for this episode include Thomas E. Sullivan as a co-pilot, Luke Baines as a pilot, Gabriel Ebert returning as an Imperial Gunner Officer, Katy O'Brian returning as an Imperial Comms Officer, Max Lloyd-Jones as the body double for Luke Skywalker, and Matthew Wood reprising his role of Bib Fortuna from Star Wars: Episode I – The Phantom Menace (1999). Brendan Wayne, Lateef Crowder, and Barry Lowin are credited as stunt doubles for the Mandalorian. Other stunt doubles cast for this episode are Amy Sturdivant for Cara Dune, Scott Lang and Eddie Perez for Boba Fett, Caitlin Dechelle for Bo-Katan Kryze, Lauren Kim for Koska Reeves, Kirk Jenkins and Tyson Turner for Moff Gideon, Ming Qiu for Fennec Shand, Matt Rugetti for Luke Skywalker, and Jesse La Flair for Bib Fortuna. Chris Bartlett is credited as a performance artist for the RA-7 droid. Grogu was performed by various puppeteers.

=== Music ===
Ludwig Göransson composed the musical score for the episode. The featured tracks were released on December 18, 2020, in the second volume of the season two soundtrack. Open the Door, which plays when Luke removes the hood from his face, references Binary Sunset, John Williams' theme for The Force from A New Hope.

== Reception ==
On Rotten Tomatoes, the episode has a score of 94% based on reviews from 52 critics, with an average rating of 8.8/10. The website's critics consensus reads: "The Rescue balances its emotional stakes with just enough blockbuster action to craft a stunning season finale."

Laura Prudom at IGN gave the episode 10 out of 10, although she wanted to give it 11 out of 10, and called it the "most momentous episode of The Mandalorian yet - both for how it connects to the larger Star Wars universe and for the seismic shift it creates in Din Djarin and Grogu's stories." Alan Sepinwall of Rolling Stone called it "a thrilling and ultimately tear-jerking conclusion to a season that leveled up in pretty much every way from a very satisfying debut year." Keith Phipps of New York Magazine gave the episode 4 out of 5 and wrote: "Great season, right? And it ended well, too, achieving the same heightened emotions as the first-season finale and without killing off anyone."

The cameo of Luke Skywalker brought great delight among fans. The corridor fight has been compared to a similar scene in Rogue One (2016) with Darth Vader and Rebel troopers, with critics and fans praising the allusion.

=== Awards and nominations ===
| Year | Award | Category | Nominee(s) | Result |
|---|---|---|---|---|
| 2021 | Primetime Emmy Awards | Outstanding Writing for a Drama Series | Jon Favreau | Nominated |
| 2021 | Primetime Emmy Awards | Outstanding Supporting Actor in a Drama Series | Giancarlo Esposito | Nominated |
| 2021 | Primetime Emmy Creative Arts Awards | Outstanding Period and/or Character Hairstyling | Maria Sandoval, Ashleigh Childers, and Wendy Southard | Nominated |
| 2021 | Primetime Emmy Creative Arts Awards | Outstanding Music Composition for a Series (Original Dramatic Score) | Ludwig Göransson | Won |
| 2021 | Primetime Emmy Creative Arts Awards | Outstanding Single-Camera Picture Editing for a Drama Series | Adam Gerstel | Nominated |
| 2021 | Primetime Emmy Creative Arts Awards | Outstanding Stunt Performance | Lateef Crowder | Won |

== Documentary special ==
On August 25, 2021, a special documentary episode titled Making of the Season 2 Finale was released as part of the second season of Disney Gallery: The Mandalorian. The special explores the process behind featuring a de-aged Hamill in the episode.
