= The Mandalorian season 2 =

The Mandalorian
- Season 2
- Promotional poster
- Showrunner: Jon Favreau
- Starring: Pedro Pascal
- No. of episodes: 8

Release
- Original network: Disney+
- Original release: October 30 – December 18, 2020

Season chronology
- ← Previous; Season 1 Next → Season 3

The second season of the American television series The Mandalorian is part of the Star Wars franchise, set after the events of the film Return of the Jedi (1983). It follows a bounty hunter trying to return "The Child" to the Jedi. The season was produced by Lucasfilm, Fairview Entertainment, and Golem Creations, with Jon Favreau serving as showrunner.

Pedro Pascal stars as the title character. Development on a second season of The Mandalorian had begun by July 2019. Favreau wanted to expand the scope of the series and introduce new characters, including several that return from previous Star Wars media. Filming took place from October 2019 to March 2020, finishing days before the COVID-19 pandemic forced film and television productions to shut down. Post-production was completed remotely, including the recording of composer Ludwig Göransson's score.

The eight-episode season premiered on the streaming service Disney+ on October 30, 2020, and ran until December 18, 2020. It received critical acclaim, with praise for the visual effects, action sequences, performances, musical score, cinematography, storyline, chemistry of the leads, sense of nostalgia, emotional weight, and the return of several characters from previous Star Wars projects. It was nominated for Outstanding Drama Series at the 73rd Primetime Emmy Awards. A third season was confirmed in December 2020.

== Episodes ==
No. overall	No. in season	Title	Directed by	Written by	Original release date
9	1	"Chapter 9: The Marshal"	Jon Favreau	Jon Favreau	October 30, 2020
The Mandalorian has been tasked with returning his charge, a child, to its people, the Jedi. He begins searching for other Mandalorians he believes can help him find the Jedi, and is directed to a rumored Mandalorian operating out of the Tatooine town Mos Pelgo. There he learns that there is no Mandalorian in Mos Pelgo, but is confronted by marshal Cobb Vanth who wears Mandalorian armor. Vanth explains that he freed his town from the control of the Mining Collective using this armor, which he bought from Jawas in the desert. The town is now frequently attacked by a krayt dragon. Vanth agrees to give the Mandalorian armor back to its people in exchange for help in killing the krayt dragon. The Mandalorian arranges an agreement between the villagers of Mos Pelgo and a local clan of Tusken Raiders to work together to kill the krayt dragon in exchange for peace between the groups. They work together to lure the krayt dragon, which is ultimately killed by the Mandalorian. He leaves with Vanth's armor, watched by a scarred Boba Fett.
10	2	"Chapter 10: The Passenger"	Peyton Reed	Jon Favreau	November 6, 2020
In exchange for information on other Mandalorians, the Mandalorian agrees to take a Frog Lady and her eggs from Tatooine to the estuary moon Trask, where her husband will fertilize the eggs. Due to the eggs' fragility, they must travel at slow "sub-light" speeds. On the way to Trask they are confronted by X-wing fighters who force the Mandalorian to a nearby icy planet because he is wanted by the New Republic for his role in a prison break; he crash-lands on the planet. While the Mandalorian fixes the ship, the child stumbles upon numerous eggs inside an ice cave which hatch to reveal a swarm of spider-like creatures. The Mandalorian, child, and Frog Lady are trapped in the Razor Crest, the Mandalorian's ship, until the X-wing pilots find them and kill the creatures. They explain that because the Mandalorian helped apprehend his accomplices from the prison break, they will drop the arrest warrant and leave him with a warning. After the Mandalorian finishes the repairs, the tattered Razor Crest takes off and resumes its journey to Trask.
11	3	"Chapter 11: The Heiress"	Bryce Dallas Howard	Jon Favreau	November 13, 2020
At Trask, the Frog Lady reunites with her husband and they direct the Mandalorian to a local inn where he can find information on other Mandalorians. A fisherman offers to take the Mandalorian to others of his kind, but onboard the fishing ship he is ambushed by the fishermen who want to sell his armor. The Mandalorian and the child are rescued by three Mandalorians, led by Bo-Katan Kryze. She enlists his help in seizing weapons from an Imperial freighter in exchange for information on the Jedi. After boarding the freighter, Bo-Katan reveals that their main objective is to capture the ship along with the weapons for their war effort to reconquer Mandalore. The Imperial captain is instructed by Moff Gideon to crash the ship, but his efforts are stopped by Bo-Katan, who questions the captain about the Darksaber. The captain kills himself. Bo-Katan directs the Mandalorian to meet the Jedi Ahsoka Tano in the city of Calodan on the forest planet of Corvus. With the Razor Crest partially repaired, the Mandalorian and the child continue on their journey.
12	4	"Chapter 12: The Siege"	Carl Weathers	Jon Favreau	November 20, 2020
The Razor Crest requires further repairs before it can reach Corvus, so the Mandalorian and the child take a detour to Nevarro where they are re-united with their allies Cara Dune and Greef Karga. While the Razor Crest is being repaired, the Mandalorian is shown how much things have improved on Nevarro since he was last there, under the stewardship of Karga as magistrate and Dune as marshal. The last challenge they are facing is a remaining Imperial base, which the Mandalorian agrees to help them destroy. They discover that the base is being used as a laboratory by Dr. Pershing to conduct experiments with the child's blood, which has a high M-count. They destroy the base and are pursued by stormtroopers on speeder bikes and TIE fighters. Dune and Karga manage to stop the speeder bikes while the Mandalorian destroys the TIE fighters with the repaired Razor Crest. The Mandalorian and the child leave for Corvus, unaware that an Imperial spy has planted a tracker on the Razor Crest for Moff Gideon.
13	5	"Chapter 13: The Jedi"	Dave Filoni	Dave Filoni	November 27, 2020
The Mandalorian and the child arrive at the city of Calodan on Corvus to find the population living in fear of the city's magistrate, Morgan Elsbeth, and her guards, including a hired mercenary named Lang. Elsbeth offers to give the Mandalorian a spear of beskar steel in exchange for killing Ahsoka. The Mandalorian finds Ahsoka outside the town and presents the child to her. Using The Force, Ahsoka determines that the child's name is Grogu, and that he had begun training as a Jedi before the rise of the Empire. She agrees to continue his training if the Mandalorian helps defeat Elsbeth. They overpower the guards, free the citizens, and the Mandalorian kills Lang. Ahsoka confronts Elsbeth, and demands to know the whereabouts of her master, Grand Admiral Thrawn. Afterwards, Ahsoka refuses to train Grogu due to his close attachment to the Mandalorian. She directs them to an ancient temple on the planet Tython where Grogu can use the Force to find other Jedi and decide his own fate. She also gives the beskar spear to the Mandalorian.
14	6	"Chapter 14: The Tragedy"	Robert Rodriguez	Jon Favreau	December 4, 2020
The Mandalorian takes Grogu to the ancient temple on Tython, and places him on the seeing stone at its center. Grogu meditates and is surrounded by a protective energy field. Boba Fett soon arrives with the mercenary Fennec Shand, whom the Mandalorian had previously left for dead on Tatooine. Fett explains that the armor worn by Cobb Vanth belongs to him, as his father Jango was a Mandalorian foundling. The Mandalorian agrees to return the armor in exchange for the safety of Grogu, just as Moff Gideon arrives and deploys stormtroopers. Fett, Shand, and the Mandalorian repel the stormtroopers' attack, during which time Grogu finishes meditating and the energy field around him disappears. Gideon destroys the Razor Crest from orbit before deploying his droid Dark Troopers, who succeed in capturing Grogu. To honor their deal, Fett and Shand promise to help the Mandalorian get Grogu back. They travel in Fett's ship Slave I to Nevarro, and ask for Dune's help in breaking criminal Migs Mayfeld out of a New Republic prison.
15	7	"Chapter 15: The Believer"	Rick Famuyiwa	Rick Famuyiwa	December 11, 2020
Dune uses her new credentials as a Marshal of the New Republic to transfer Mayfeld, an ex-Imperial, from prison to her custody. He agrees to help locate Moff Gideon's cruiser, but needs access to an internal terminal. He suggests a secret Imperial mining hub on Morak. Once there, Mayfeld and the Mandalorian hijack a transport carrying the explosive mineral rhydonium and manage to reach the mining facility despite attacks from local pirates. They acquire Gideon's coordinates from the terminal, but the Mandalorian is forced to remove his helmet in front of others for the first time since he took his Mandalorian oath. The pair are confronted by Mayfeld's old Imperial commanding officer, whom Mayfeld kills when he gloats about atrocities committed by the Empire in Operation Cinder. Mayfeld and the Mandalorian escape with the help of Shand, Dune, and Fett. Dune decides to let Mayfeld go. The Mandalorian sends Gideon a transmission warning that he is coming for Grogu, paraphrasing a similar speech that Gideon had previously given.
16	8	"Chapter 16: The Rescue"	Peyton Reed	Jon Favreau	December 18, 2020
The Mandalorian and Dune board an Imperial shuttle and capture Dr. Pershing. They enlist the help of Bo-Katan and Koska Reeves to rescue Grogu; in return, Bo-Katan will get Gideon's cruiser and the Darksaber, while the Mandalorian considers helping her liberate Mandalore. They use the shuttle to get close enough to crash land on Gideon's cruiser, with Fett pretending to attack them in Slave I. Bo-Katan, Koska, Shand, and Dune fight through stormtroopers to the cruiser's bridge. The Mandalorian finds the Dark Troopers, barely defeats one of them with the beskar spear, and ejects the rest into space. He fights Gideon with the spear and overpowers him, making the Mandalorian the new rightful owner of the Darksaber. The Dark Troopers fly back onto the ship, but are all destroyed by Luke Skywalker, the Jedi that Grogu contacted on Tython. The Mandalorian gives Grogu permission to go with Skywalker and R2-D2 to complete his training. In a post-credits scene, Fett and Shand travel to Jabba's Palace on Tatooine, where Fett kills Bib Fortuna and claims the throne.

== Cast and characters ==
=== Starring ===
- Pedro Pascal as Din Djarin / The Mandalorian
- Grogu / "The Child"

=== Recurring co-stars ===
- Amy Sedaris as Peli Motto
- Temuera Morrison as Boba Fett
- Misty Rosas as the Frog Lady (Note: The Frog Lady is voiced by Dee Bradley Baker.)
- Mercedes Varnado as Koska Reeves
- Katee Sackhoff as Bo-Katan Kryze
- Giancarlo Esposito as Moff Gideon
- Gina Carano as Cara Dune
- Omid Abtahi as Dr. Pershing
- Ming-Na Wen as Fennec Shand

=== Other co-stars ===
- John Leguizamo as the voice of Gor Koresh
- Timothy Olyphant as Cobb Vanth
- Richard Ayoade as the voice of Q9-0
- Simon Kassianides as Axe Woves
- Titus Welliver as an Imperial Captain
- Carl Weathers as Greef Karga
- Horatio Sanz as a Mythrol
- Michael Biehn as Lang
- Rosario Dawson as Ahsoka Tano
- Diana Lee Inosanto as Morgan Elsbeth
- Bill Burr as Migs Mayfeld
- Mark Hamill as Luke Skywalker (Note: Mark Hamill was digitally de-aged to portray a younger Luke Skywalker, with Max Lloyd Jones serving as an on-set body double for the character.)

== Production ==
=== Development ===
In July 2019, The Mandalorian creator and showrunner Jon Favreau confirmed that there would be a second season of the series. He had already begun writing the new season, and pre-production was underway. It consists of eight episodes. There were fewer start-up costs for the second season, allowing more of the season's budget to be allocated to each episode than has been possible during the first season. Disney CEO Bob Iger announced in February 2020 that the second season would premiere that October.

Rick Famuyiwa was returning as a director by August 2019, but Taika Waititi was not expected to return due to a scheduling conflict with his film Next Goal Wins (2023). A month later, Favreau said he would direct an episode of the second season, after being unable to direct any of the first due to his commitments to The Lion King (2019). At the end of October, Carl Weathers was confirmed to be directing for the season; Favreau had promised that Weathers could direct a second-season episode when hiring the actor to co-star in the first season. Dave Filoni had returned as director for the second season by March 2020. On May 4, Star Wars Day, Robert Rodriguez and Peyton Reed revealed that they had also directed episodes of the second season. Rodriguez was not originally intended to direct in the season, joining as a last-minute replacement. That June, Bryce Dallas Howard revealed that she had also returned to direct an episode of the second season.

=== Writing ===
The season begins "very directly" after the end of the first season, with the Mandalorian protecting "The Child" and searching for its home. Favreau said the second season would introduce a larger story, with the episodes being "less isolated" than many of the first season's episodes were, though he said each episode of the second season would still have "its own flavor". He added that the new characters introduced in the second season would come with new storylines, allowing the series to begin to explore stories other than the Mandalorian's. Favreau was inspired by the multiple different storylines of Game of Thrones (2011-2019), an approach that he described as "very appealing to me as an audience member".

=== Casting ===
Pedro Pascal stars in the series as The Mandalorian. Also returning from the first season are recurring co-stars Giancarlo Esposito as Moff Gideon and Gina Carano as Cara Dune, in addition to Amy Sedaris as Peli Motto, Carl Weathers as Greef Karga, Horatio Sanz as a Mythrol, Omid Abtahi as Dr. Pershing, Ming-Na Wen as Fennec Shand, and Bill Burr as Migs Mayfeld. Filoni reprises his role as X-Wing pilot Trapper Wolf, while Paul Sun-Hyung Lee portrays the pilot Carson Teva.

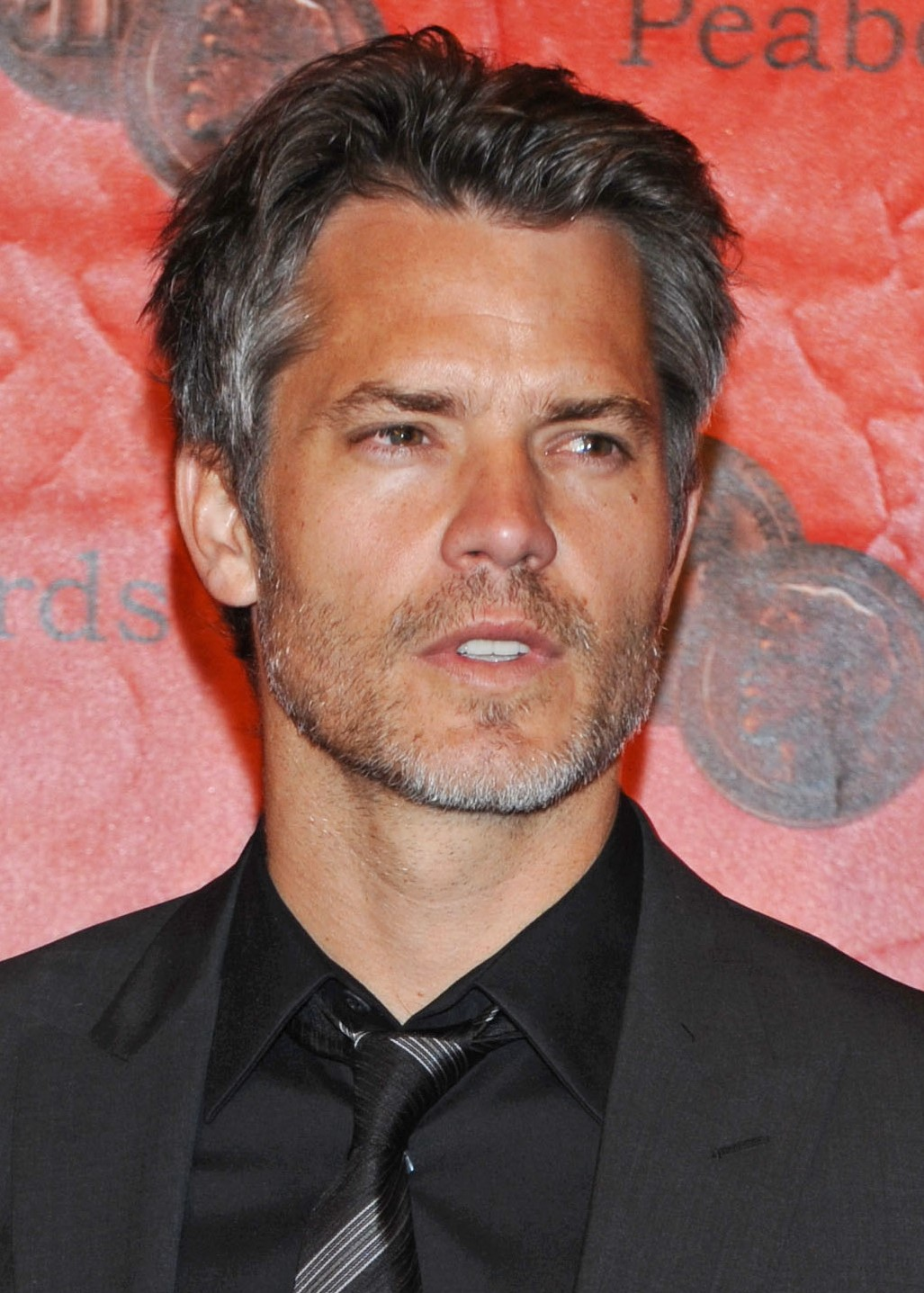
Timothy Olyphant

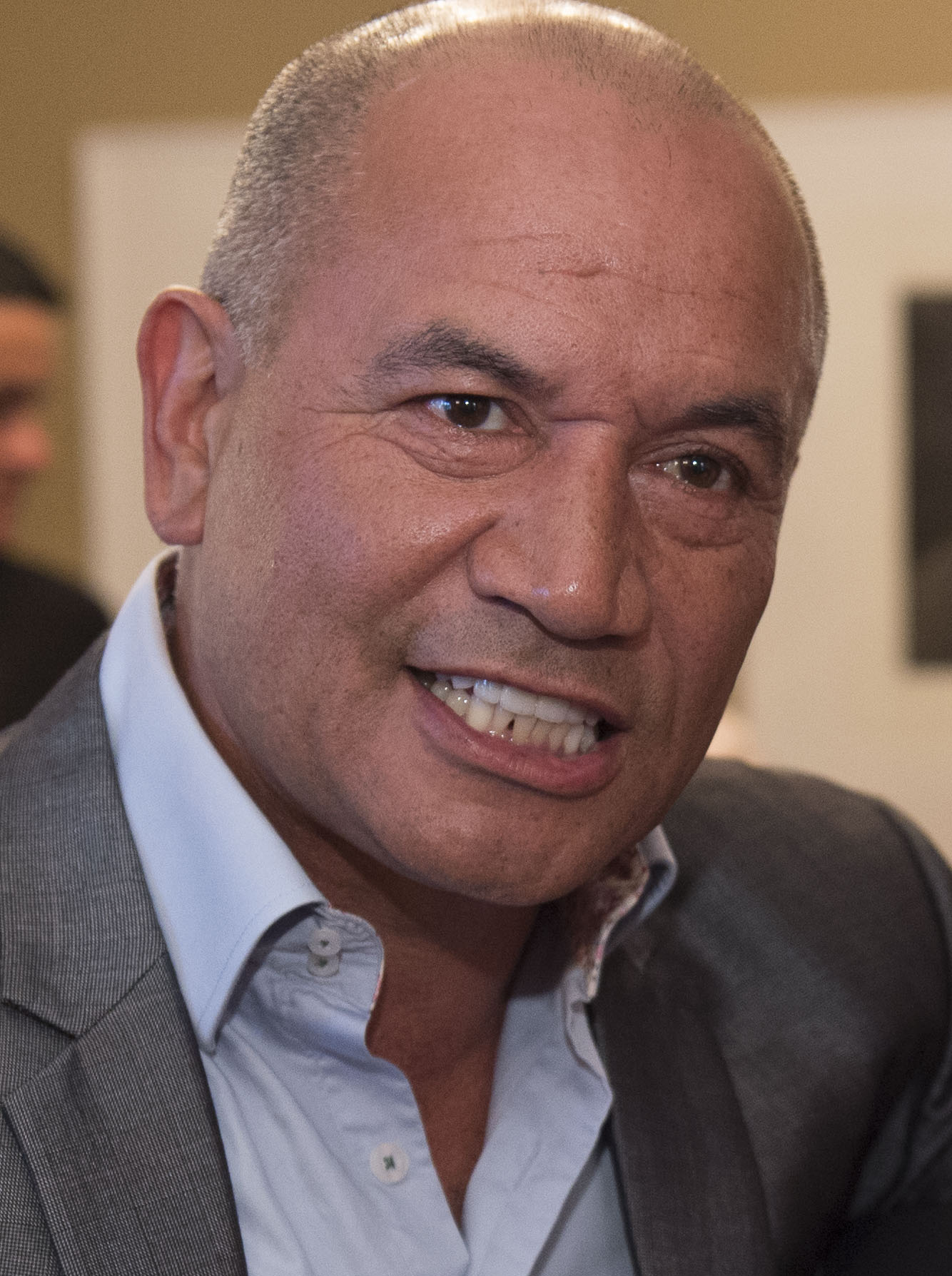
Temuera Morrison

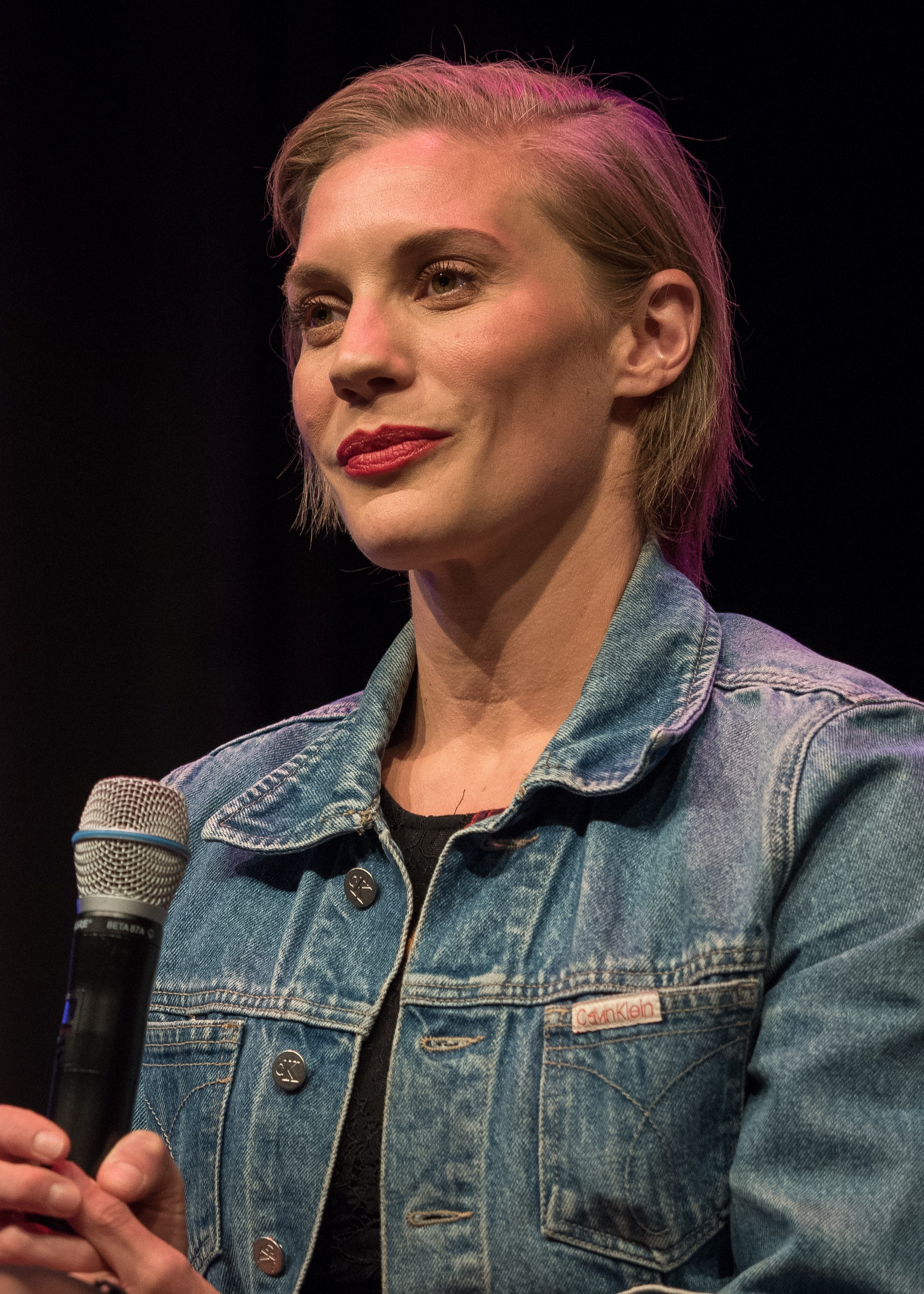
Katee Sackhoff

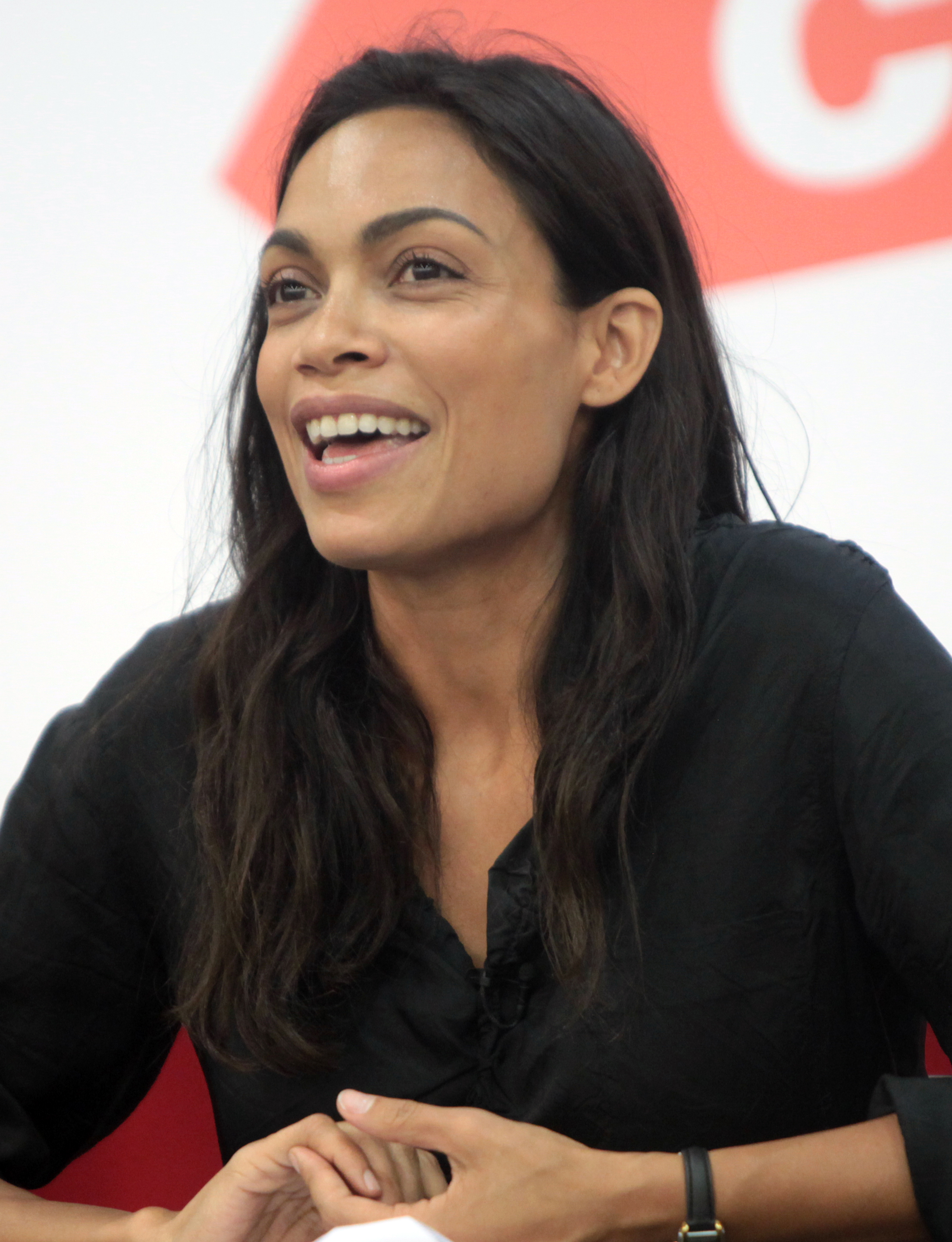
Rosario Dawson

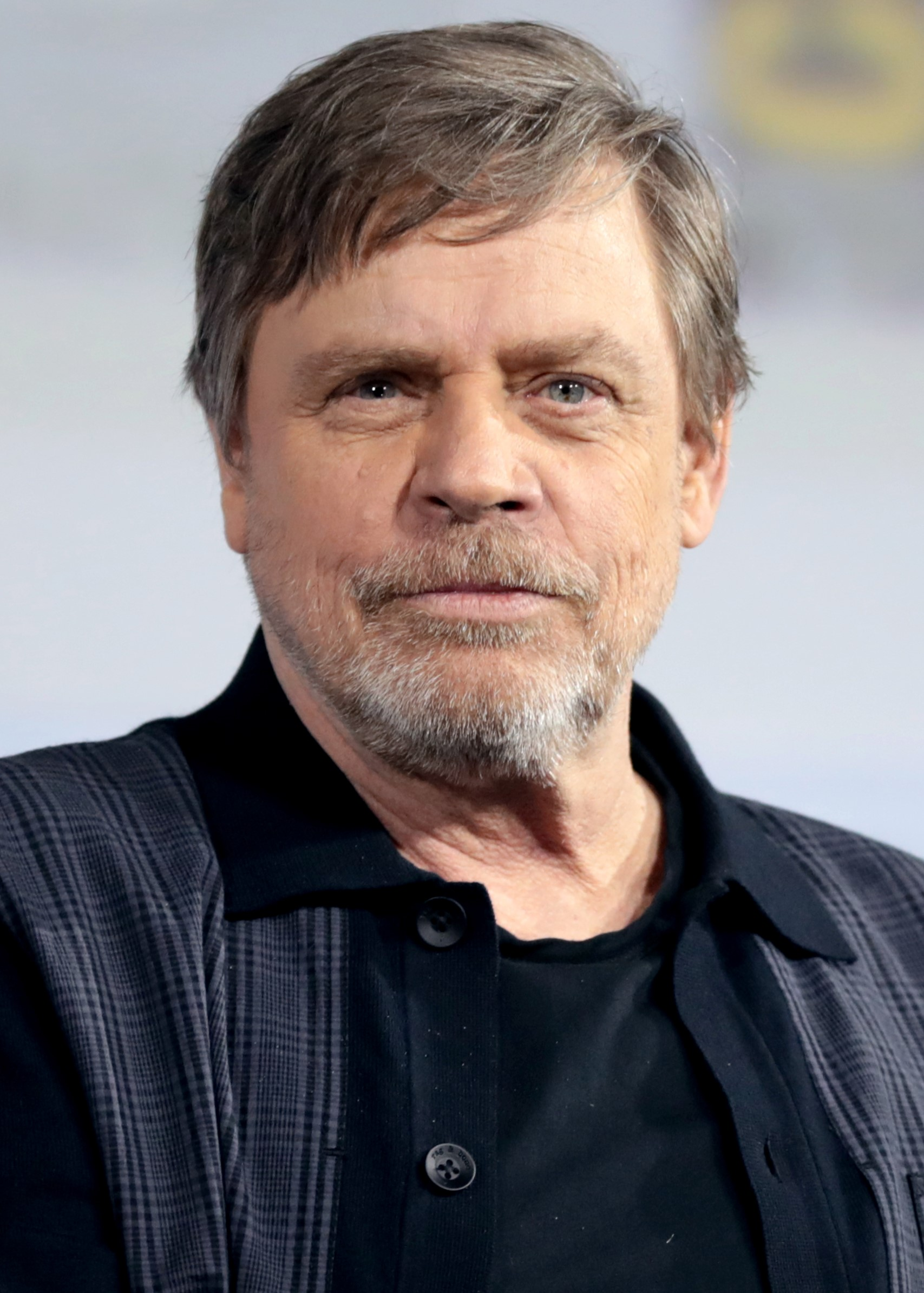
Mark Hamill

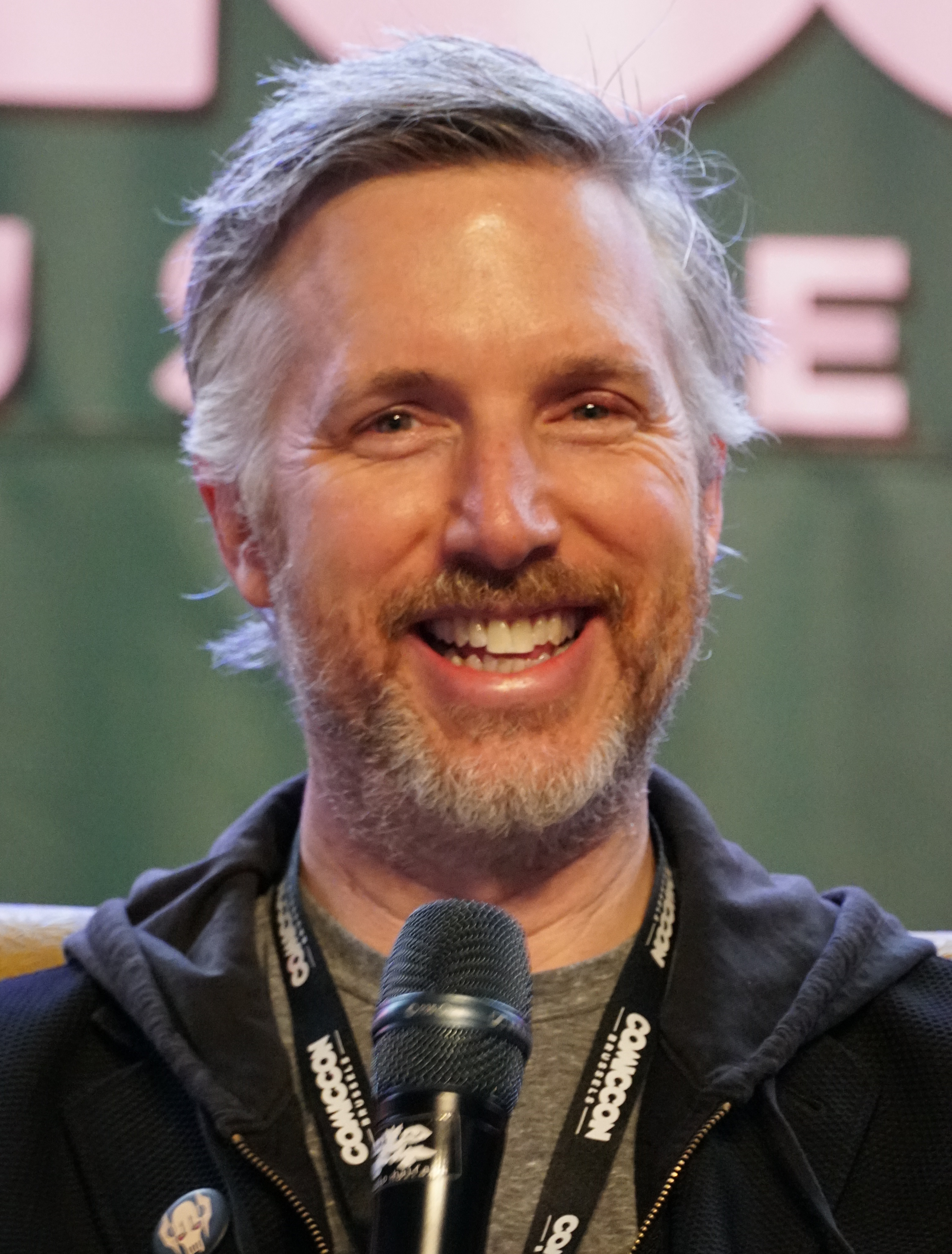
Matthew Wood

Olyphant, Morrison, Sackhoff, Dawson, Hamill, and Wood all portray characters from previous Star Wars media in the season.

In March 2020, Rosario Dawson was reported to be appearing as Ahsoka Tano in the second season. This marks the character's first live-action appearance after previously appearing in the animated series Star Wars: The Clone Wars and Star Wars Rebels and having a voice-only role in the film Star Wars: The Rise of Skywalker (2019); the character was voiced by Ashley Eckstein in these appearances. Dawson had previously expressed interest in taking on the role in live-action after her casting was suggested by a fan in February 2017. Also in March, Michael Biehn joined the cast as Lang, an enforcer. That May, Temuera Morrison was set to reprise his role as Boba Fett in the second season. Morrison portrayed Boba's father Jango Fett in Star Wars: Episode II – Attack of the Clones (2002), and went on to provide the voice of Boba in various Star Wars media. Before Morrison's involvement was confirmed, the character briefly appeared in the first-season episode "Chapter 5: The Gunslinger". Also in May, Katee Sackhoff was revealed to be reprising her role of Bo-Katan Kryze in the second season after previously voicing the character in The Clone Wars and Rebels, and Timothy Olyphant was revealed to be in the season as well. He portrays Cobb Vanth, a character from the Star Wars: Aftermath novels who wears Boba Fett's armor. In September 2020, Mercedes Varnado was revealed to have been cast in the season; she appears as the Mandalorian Koska Reeves, a member of the Nite Owls. In the season finale, the character Luke Skywalker appears along with his droid R2-D2; Mark Hamill reprises his role from the Star Wars films, digitally de-aged to portray a younger version of Skywalker, with Max Lloyd Jones serving as an on-set body double for the character. Additionally, Matthew Wood reprises his role as Bib Fortuna from Star Wars: Episode I – The Phantom Menace (1999).

=== Filming ===
The capabilities of Industrial Light & Magic's StageCraft technology were increased from season one, with the "volume" set also expanded for the season. Filming for the season began on October 7, 2019, once again using the working title Huckleberry. Favreau directed the season premiere. There was "heightened secrecy" surrounding the second season, with actors only receiving scripts for the episodes they were in and being brought to set in hooded cloaks. Additionally, many of the cast and crew were unaware that the Jedi that appears in the final episode of the season would be Luke Skywalker. As he did for the first season, Star Wars creator George Lucas visited the set while Filoni was directing for the second season.

Sam Hargrave served as second unit director for the season. Hargrave said Favreau was "looking for someone... who has experience with action" and that he "wanted to build on" what was done in season one, while bringing in "a new perspective and [taking] it to another level" for season two. Pascal was able to portray the Mandalorian more on set this season than the last, when his other commitments resulted in stunt doubles Brendan Wayne and Lateef Crowder portraying the character at times; Both Wayne and Crowder returned for the season, with Barry Lowin also serving as a double in the season finale. Additional filming took place on location in Simi Valley, California for sequences in "Chapter 14: The Tragedy".

Filming for the season wrapped on March 8, 2020. This was described as "fortuitous" as it was just four days before film and television productions around the world were shut down due to the COVID-19 pandemic. The pandemic still affected post-production for the season.

=== Music ===
Composer Ludwig Göransson was able to take advantage of the emotional attachment that the audience developed with his musical themes during the first season, which gave him the ability to "immediately give them what they want, or play the themes with different harmonies or different instrumentation, and people will instantly recognize it". Göransson uses the series' main theme "in a lot of new and different iterations" in the second season. He explained that the Mandalorian's theme was primarily played on the recorder during the first season to emphasize his "lone man's journey", but was played on guitar in some flashbacks to the character's childhood. In the second season, the theme is primarily played on electric guitar to show the character's new confidence and relationship with Grogu. Göransson uses an Ibanez eight-string electric guitar for this.

Göransson introduces new musical themes for each episode in the season, with new sounds and ideas, as each episode has a different genre, setting, and characters. He uses a "rock 'n' roll, heavy metal mood" in "Chapter 9: The Marshal" as an homage to the music Ennio Morricone wrote for Sergio Leone's Western films. "Chapter 10: The Passenger" prominently features Göransson's theme for Grogu, which he wrote during development on the first season. It is played on a Fender Rhodes electric piano, which Göransson compared to John Williams' use of the glockenspiel and celeste in the Star Wars films to create a "storybook or magical feeling". For Bo-Katan's introduction in "Chapter 11: The Heiress", Göransson used distorted synthesizer sounds to create an industrial sound that matched the character's "speed and energy". His theme for Boba Fett also uses distorted sounds, inspired by sound effects that Rodriguez added to his initial cut of "Chapter 14: The Tragedy". The first season does not feature any references to Williams' original themes, but there were a lot of conversations between Göransson and the producers about how to "flirt with the Star Wars themes a little bit" in the second season, leading to several inclusions: Göransson references Williams' theme for Yoda in "Chapter 13: The Jedi" when that character is mentioned, and he reprises Williams' theme for The Force when Skywalker appears in "Chapter 16: The Rescue". He also uses Kevin Kiner's theme for Ahsoka Tano from Star Wars: The Clone Wars for scenes with that character.

The biggest challenge for the season's post-production team was recording Göransson's orchestral score during the COVID-19 pandemic. The series was one of the first to use the 20th Century Fox scoring stage when it allowed recordings again. Thirty string players were recorded there for the first seven episodes, with the players wearing masks and spaced six feet apart. The final episode increased the string players to forty, while also adding over a dozen brass and woodwind players. To comply with health regulations and musician union rules, the strings were recorded on separate days from the brass and woodwinds. Additional musicians were recorded remotely and combined with the scoring stage recordings, as well as recordings of Göransson playing the guitar, recorder, piano, bass, rock drums, and synthesizers. Recording took place from July to September 2020.

Unlike the first season, where an album of music was released for each episode, Walt Disney Records released the soundtrack for the second season in two volumes: music from "Chapter 9" through "Chapter 12" was released on November 20, 2020, with a second soundtrack for "Chapter 13" through "Chapter 16" released on December 18.

The Mandalorian: Season 2 – Vol. 1 (Chapters 9–12) [Original Score]
No.	Title	Length
1.	"Mando Is Back"	4:04
2.	"Enjoy the Fights"	2:55
3.	"The Marshal's Tale"	6:05
4.	"Tusken Raiders"	3:18
5.	"Get the Child"	2:06
6.	"Beneath the Ice"	5:25
7.	"Snacks"	2:46
8.	"Reunited"	1:40
9.	"Ship o hoj, Mandalorians!"	7:59
10.	"Long Live the Empire"	4:05
11.	"Back Together"	2:19
12.	"Experiment"	5:16
13.	"Quite a Soldier"	2:46
Total length:		50:50

The Mandalorian: Season 2 – Vol. 2 (Chapters 13–16) [Original Score]
No.	Title	Length
1.	"The Sorcerer"	3:32
2.	"The Story"	6:48
3.	"A Mandalorian and a Jedi"	1:57
4.	"Ahsoka Lives"	3:43
5.	"The Seeing Stone"	2:12
6.	"Capture the Flag"	5:38
7.	"The Armor"	2:43
8.	"Invaders on Their Land"	2:48
9.	"Brown Eyes"	2:51
10.	"Rest in Peace"	2:44
11.	"Activated"	6:08
12.	"The Sword"	3:07
13.	"Troopers"	2:33
14.	"A Friend"	3:52
15.	"Open the Door"	4:52
16.	"Come with Me"	2:45
Total length:		58:13

== Marketing ==
The first trailer for the season was released on September 15, 2020, while a special look trailer debuted on October 19, 2020, during Monday Night Football. Merchandise for the season was revealed each Monday from October 26 to December 21, 2020, as part of the "Mando Mondays" initiative.

== Release ==
=== Streaming ===
The season premiered on the streaming service Disney+ on October 30, 2020.

=== Home media ===
The season was released on Ultra HD Blu-ray and Blu-ray by Walt Disney Studios Home Entertainment on December 12, 2023, with Steelbook packaging and concept art cards. It included two featurettes, "Designing the New Republic" that looks at the New Republic design within the series, and "Forging the Covert: Part Two" that looks at the designs of the expanding world of the Mandalorians.

== Reception ==
=== Critical response ===
The Mandalorian season 2: Critical reception by episode
Season 2 (2020): Percentage of positive critics' reviews tracked by the website Rotten Tomatoes

The review aggregator website Rotten Tomatoes reported an 93% approval rating with an average score of 8.55/10 based on 449 reviews. The site's critical consensus reads: "With fan favorites and fresh faces galore both in front of and behind the camera, The Mandalorian's sophomore season solidifies its place as one of Star Wars's most engaging and exciting sagas." Metacritic, which uses a weighted average, assigned a score of 76 out of 100 based on 14 critics, indicating "generally favorable" reviews.

=== Audience viewership ===
The Mandalorian became the first Disney+ show to make an appearance on Nielsen's top 10 list, placing number three in the week of October 26, with a total of 1 billion minutes streamed that week, just behind shows like The Office and The Queen's Gambit. The show became the most watched program in November, reaching 29% of viewers, beating The Queen's Gambit at around 20%. In the week of December 14, the show audience increased more and managed to finally reach number 1 in the Nielsen ratings, beating "The Office" with a total of 1.3 billion streams.

=== Accolades ===
Year	Award	Category	Nominee(s)	Result	Ref.
2021	Critics' Choice Super Awards	Best Science Fiction/Fantasy Series	The Mandalorian	Won	
2021	Critics' Choice Super Awards	Best Actor in a Science Fiction/Fantasy Series	Pedro Pascal	Nominated	
2021	Critics' Choice Television Awards	Best Drama Series	The Mandalorian	Nominated	
2021	Golden Globe Awards	Best Television Series – Drama	The Mandalorian	Nominated	
2021	Satellite Awards	Best Television Series – Genre	The Mandalorian	Nominated	
2021	Screen Actors Guild Awards	Outstanding Performance by a Stunt Ensemble in a Comedy or Drama Series	The Mandalorian	Won	
2021	Black Reel Awards	Outstanding Supporting Actor, Drama Series	Giancarlo Esposito	Nominated	
2021	Black Reel Awards	Outstanding Guest Actor, Drama Series	Carl Weathers	Nominated	
2021	Black Reel Awards	Outstanding Guest Actress, Drama Series	Rosario Dawson	Nominated	
2021	Black Reel Awards	Outstanding Directing, Drama Series	Rick Famuyiwa (for "Chapter 15: The Believer")	Nominated	
2021	Black Reel Awards	Outstanding Writing, Drama Series	Rick Famuyiwa (for "Chapter 15: The Believer")	Nominated	
2021	Writers Guild of America Awards	Drama Series	Rick Famuyiwa, Jon Favreau and Dave Filoni	Nominated	
2021	TCA Awards	Outstanding Achievement in Drama	The Mandalorian	Nominated	
2021	Primetime Emmy Awards	Outstanding Drama Series	Jon Favreau, Dave Filoni, Kathleen Kennedy and Colin Wilson	Nominated	
2021	Primetime Emmy Awards	Outstanding Supporting Actor in a Drama Series	Giancarlo Esposito (for "Chapter 16: The Rescue")	Nominated	
2021	Primetime Emmy Awards	Outstanding Directing for a Drama Series	Jon Favreau (for "Chapter 9: The Marshal")	Nominated	
2021	Primetime Emmy Awards	Outstanding Writing for a Drama Series	Dave Filoni (for "Chapter 13: The Jedi")	Nominated	
2021	Primetime Emmy Awards	Outstanding Writing for a Drama Series	Jon Favreau (for "Chapter 16: The Rescue")	Nominated	
2022	Saturn Awards	Best Science Fiction Series (Streaming)	The Mandalorian	Nominated	
2022	Saturn Awards	Guest Performance in a Streaming Series	Rosario Dawson	Nominated	

== Documentary specials ==
In December 2020, it was announced that a special, Disney Gallery: The Mandalorian – Making of Season Two, would premiere on December 25, 2020. The hour-long special features interviews with the cast and crew of The Mandalorian and behind-the-scenes footage for all eight episodes of season two. A second special, The Making of the Season 2 Finale, was released on August 25, 2021, exploring the process behind featuring a de-aged Hamill in the finale.
