= Chapter 13: The Jedi =

- The Mandalorian episode
- Promotional poster featuring co-star Rosario Dawson as Ahsoka Tano. This episode marks the character's live-action debut.
- Episode no.: Season 2 Episode 5
- Directed by: Dave Filoni
- Written by: Dave Filoni
- Cinematography by: Baz Idoine
- Editing by: Andrew S. Eisen
- Original release date: November 27, 2020
- Running time: 43 minutes

Co-starring
- Michael Biehn as Lang; Rosario Dawson as Ahsoka Tano; Diana Lee Inosanto as Morgan Elsbeth

Episode chronology
← Previous "Chapter 12: The Siege"	Next → "Chapter 14: The Tragedy"
- The Mandalorian season 2

"Chapter 13: The Jedi" is the fifth episode of the second season of the American television series The Mandalorian. It stars Pedro Pascal as the Mandalorian, a bounty hunter trying to return "The Child" to his people, the Jedi. The episode is part of the Star Wars franchise, set after the events of Return of the Jedi (1983), and was written and directed by executive producer Dave Filoni.

The episode co-stars Rosario Dawson as Ahsoka Tano, a character that Filoni co-created for the animated series Star Wars: The Clone Wars. It is the character's live-action debut, which Filoni planned as a way to reveal the Child's real name, Grogu. Dawson was cast after fans suggested her for the role years before this live-action appearance was planned. Filoni put a lot of care into the character's design, and composer Ludwig Göransson reprised Kevin Kiner's theme for the character from The Clone Wars. The episode was filmed using the series' video wall technology so Filoni could control the lighting, and he cited the films of Akira Kurosawa as an influence.

"Chapter 13: The Jedi" was released on the streaming service Disney+ on November 27, 2020, to estimated high viewership and positive reviews. Critics highlighted Filoni's writing and directing, the live-action introduction of Ahsoka, and Dawson's portrayal of the character. The episode has been nominated for and won several awards, including receiving eight Primetime Emmy Award nominations. A spin-off series titled Ahsoka was announced in December 2020, written by Filoni and with Dawson and Diana Lee Inosanto reprising their roles.

== Plot ==
On the forest planet of Corvus, Ahsoka Tano confronts Imperial Magistrate Morgan Elsbeth, ruler of the city of Calodan, and her lieutenant Lang. Ahsoka gives Elsbeth one day to surrender and divulge her master's location.

The Mandalorian and "The Child" arrive at Calodan in search of Ahsoka, as directed by Bo-Katan Kryze. They are taken directly to Elsbeth, who offers the Mandalorian a beskar spear in exchange for killing Ahsoka.

The Mandalorian finds Ahsoka and she communicates with the Child using The Force. She learns that his name is Grogu and he was raised at the Jedi Temple on Coruscant. After the Jedi Order fell, Grogu was rescued and has been suppressing his powers to survive.

Ahsoka refuses to train Grogu, wary of the path he could take due to his attachment to the Mandalorian and the fear and anger inside him. The Mandalorian asks if she will help get Grogu training in exchange for him helping Ahsoka confront Elsbeth.

Ahsoka and the Mandalorian storm the city, killing all the guards and freeing the citizens. The Mandalorian kills Lang, while Ahsoka engages in a duel with Elsbeth. Ahsoka defeats Elsbeth and demands she divulges the location of her master, Grand Admiral Thrawn.

Ahsoka gives the beskar spear to the Mandalorian and directs him to the ruins of a Jedi temple on Tython, where Grogu may be able to contact another Jedi through the Force.

== Production ==
=== Development ===
During development on the first season of The Mandalorian, creator Jon Favreau told executive producer Dave Filoni that "The Child", a character that is the same species as the Star Wars character Yoda, was called Grogu. Filoni began thinking of ways that this could be revealed and realized that the character Ahsoka Tano knew Yoda, would be able to connect with Grogu, and was present during the events of the series. Filoni co-created Ahsoka for the animated series Star Wars: The Clone Wars, in which she was voiced by Ashley Eckstein. Eckstein reprised the role in the series Star Wars Rebels and had a voice-only role in the live-action film Star Wars: The Rise of Skywalker (2019).

Ahsoka was reported to be appearing in the second season of The Mandalorian in March 2020. Filoni said he had avoided introducing Ahsoka in the first season because he did not want to "mess it up", but felt it made sense in the second season to reveal Grogu's name. Filoni announced in May that he had written and directed an episode of the second season, which was confirmed to be the fifth episode by that September. In November, ahead of the episode's release, the title was revealed to be "Chapter 13: The Jedi". It was important to Filoni that fans who grew up watching the animated Ahsoka felt that the live-action version was the same character, and was accurate to her earlier appearances.

=== Writing ===
Filoni described Ahsoka as a wandering samurai in the episode, a progression from her portrayal in Rebels where she is a more traditional knight. This moves the character closer to the "Gandalf stage" that Filoni envisioned her eventually becoming. He said she was more world-weary in the episode than in her previous appearances. For the campfire scene where Ahsoka tells the Mandalorian about Grogu and his backstory, Filoni was inspired by the scene from Star Wars: A New Hope (1977) where Obi-Wan Kenobi tells Luke Skywalker about his father. Ahsoka has a larger quest that she is on when the Mandalorian finds her, which involves her hunt for Grand Admiral Thrawn as first seen in the epilogue of the Rebels series finale. Filoni said the events of this episode might take place before that epilogue. He acknowledged that the episode is titled "The Jedi", but Ahsoka left the Jedi Order in The Clone Wars and famously said "I am no Jedi" in Rebels. He explained that to most observers, such as the Mandalorian, she still appears to be a Jedi. Filoni also felt that "by being so selfless and rejecting a lot of paths that would have given her power—she's more Jedi-like than even some characters who claim to be Jedi."

=== Casting ===
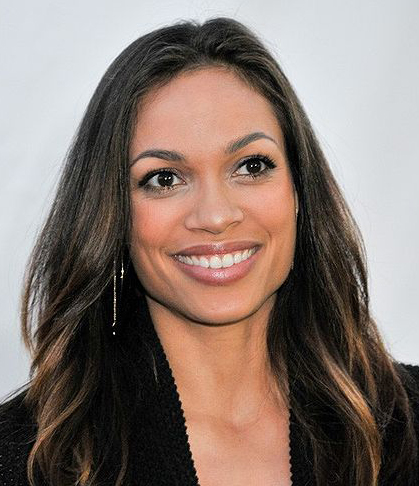
Rosario Dawson co-stars in the episode as Ahsoka Tano, marking the character's first live-action appearance

When Ahsoka was reported to be appearing in the season in March 2020, she was set to be portrayed by Rosario Dawson, though this was not officially confirmed until the episode's release. Dawson had previously expressed interest in taking on the role in live-action after her casting was suggested by a fan in February 2017, something that Filoni had taken note of at the time as he felt the actress would be good for the role. The concept art of Dawson as Ahsoka was created for the series before she was contacted by Filoni and Favreau before the release of the series' first season. After Dawson was officially cast in the role, she watched the character's animated appearances in order and was fascinated to learn of "this whole other world that existed in the animated series, and this young girl was the heart of that space". She highlighted the importance of the character's relationship with Anakin Skywalker, and noted that she had studied acting with Hayden Christensen who portrayed Skywalker in the Star Wars prequel films. Filoni said that after meeting Dawson he knew she was right for the role, and the fan casting or her connection to Christensen ultimately did not play a part in his decision. Dawson studied Eckstein's voice performance for the character "like crazy and tried [her] best to honor that".

Also in March 2020, Michael Biehn joined the cast of the season, reportedly as a bounty hunter. He co-stars in "Chapter 13: The Jedi" as the enforcer Lang, while Diana Lee Inosanto co-stars as Magistrate Morgan Elsbeth. Filoni wanted the Magistrate to be a challenge for Ahsoka and "someone that could go toe to toe with her instantly", and felt Inosanto fulfilled that with her martial arts experience. Lang was added to the episode as an experienced gunslinger for the Mandalorian to fight, and Biehn was cast due to his experience and understanding of Western films. Filoni explained that Biehn had a philosophy about how his character would fight the Mandalorian that was woven into Lang's scenes, down to the number of times the character would shoot. Filoni stated that with both Biehn and Inosanto, he had "two people who knew their characters; they brought so much to the roles through their personal skills and experiences. As the villains of the story I felt we had a good matchup of [the Mandalorian] and Ahsoka versus the Magistrate and her gunslinger."

The episode's guest cast includes Wing T. Chao as Governor Wing, James Croak as a prisoner of the Magistrate, Dylan Alvarado and Mai Brunelle as villager children, and Clark Schierle as another villager. Grogu was performed by various puppeteers, some of whom Dawson had previously worked with on the film Men in Black II (2002).

=== Design ===
Filoni said it was rare for someone working in animation to get to translate those designs into live-action, and all elements of Ahsoka's design for the episode were considered to an "unbelievable" degree. This includes the character's horns and head tails, which are much shorter in the episode than they were in Rebels. Concept designer Brian Matyas did "a ton of design exploration for her and their appropriate size for the actor", and said the chief concern with their size was accommodating Dawson's stunts and movement. The prosthetic that Dawson wore for the head tails used a headband that clipped at the back of her head to hold it in place while she was fighting and doing stunts.

Filoni wanted the character's orange skin to be warm and natural, but not as brightly saturated as it is in the animated series since he felt that would not work as well for live-action. He wanted the white markings on her face to be subtle, and not look like face paint. A lot of tests were done to make sure the colors looked correct in the volume that the series is filmed in, with Filoni stating that orange tends to look more like magenta when filmed in that environment. He did not want the make-up and prosthetics to get in the way of Dawson's performance and told Dawson not to worry about the fact that Ahsoka's eyes are blue in the animated series and Dawson's are not. Despite this, Dawson wanted to wear contact lenses to be accurate to the character and said they were what made the difference between feeling like she was in cosplay versus actually portraying the character.

Prop master Josh Roth explained that Filoni and the crew wanted to make Ahsoka's lightsaber hilts elegant and slender, comparing them to shoto and katana, but they had technical issues with doing this because they put lighting technology and batteries inside lightsaber hilts to make them glow on set and create interactive lighting on the environment and actors. The hilts had to be made bigger to fit this technology, but Filoni insisted they be slimmer. The solution was to use external batteries to power the lighting technology.

The planet Corvus is portrayed as a dead and burnt forest, for which Filoni was inspired by the aftermath of the forest fires in Northern California. He thought that would create a haunting and foreboding feeling, and was able to use the setting to help tell the story such as having "a little bit of green and life" appear around Ahsoka in certain scenes. The Magistrate is guarded by two HK-87 assassin droids in the episode. These are based on the HK-47 droid from the video game Star Wars: Knights of the Old Republic (2003), but their appearance is closer to droid designs by original Star Wars concept artist Ralph McQuarrie. They feature the insignia of Thrawn's Seventh Fleet from Rebels.

=== Filming ===
Filming for the series takes place on a volume in Los Angeles, using Industrial Light & Magic's StageCraft technology to project backgrounds onto a video wall that surrounds the set. Most of the episode is set outdoors, but filming inside on the volume allowed Filoni to control the lighting. It was important to him that the set had the "atmosphere" of a real location, and the crew looked to achieve this by adding particles, wind, and smoke. Filoni felt that the environment was an important part of telling the episode's story, and referenced the films of Akira Kurosawa as an influence for the episode. Cinematographer Baz Idoine described the episode as a "magical journey into Kurosawa-esque samurai culture".

Filoni found Inosanto's knowledge of fight choreography to be useful to him as a director on set. When talking to Dawson about her fight scenes, he referenced Hiroshi Inagaki's Samurai Trilogy of films as well as other films starring Toshiro Mifune. Stunt coordinator Ryan Watson said Dawson's fight movements were intended to be "flowy", and less clean than the movements of a samurai. As he did for the first season, Star Wars creator and Ahsoka Tano co-creator George Lucas visited the set while Filoni was directing the episode, and met Dawson in her make-up and costume as Ahsoka. Dawson described the moment as Lucas and Filoni both "looking at their imagination come to life".

=== Music ===
Ludwig Göransson composed the musical score for the episode. The featured tracks were released on December 18, 2020, in the second volume of the season two soundtrack.

Göransson used Kevin Kiner's theme for Ahsoka from Star Wars: The Clone Wars in the episode. He also referenced John Williams' theme for Yoda when that character is mentioned by Ahsoka. This was a big moment for the series, which previously avoided referencing Williams' existing themes. Göransson said there were a lot of discussions with the series' producers about how to "flirt with the Star Wars themes a little bit" in the second season, leading to these inclusions. Filoni felt that the way Göransson used Yoda's theme at the moment was masterful, and said it added "a little grace moment" to the scene.

== Reception ==
=== Viewership ===
According to Nielsen Media Research, which tracks the number of minutes for streaming service content watched by United States audiences on television sets, 1.21 billion minutes of The Mandalorian were watched in the week of the episode's release, ranking fourth on the company's top 10 streaming programs list for that week.

=== Critical response ===
The review aggregator website Rotten Tomatoes reported a 96% approval rating with an average score of 9.1/10 based on 49 reviews. The site's critical consensus reads: "'The Jedi' successfully brings Ahsoka to life in an epic installment that encapsulates everything that makes The Mandalorian such a worthy entry into the Star Wars canon."

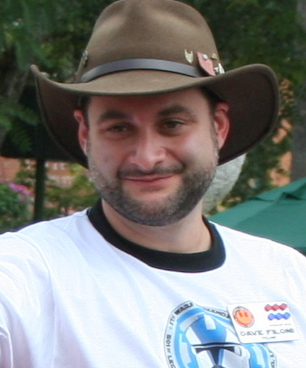
Writer and director Dave Filoni was praised for his work on the episode

Mike Vanderbilt of The A.V. Club, gave the episode an "A" and noted "Beautifully composed shots by Filoni and cinematographer Baz Idoine". He did note that he would have preferred to see more development from the villagers in the episode. Vanderbilt described the episode as "one part samurai flick and one part spaghetti Western, which is about as perfect a distillation of Star Wars as you can get." Writing for Vulture, Keith Phillips gave the episode four out of five stars, praised the guest cast and noted: "The Mandalorian always looks good, but Filoni really outdoes himself with this episode with its memorable action sequences and striking compositions". Reviewer Ian Thomas Malone gave it a positive review stating: "Chapter 13 was the best episode of the series, striking a perfect balance between casual viewers and Star Wars superfans". In a positive review for RogerEbert.com, Nick Allen states: "it's a thrilling mix of old lore and new paths, showing where 'Star Wars' has been but also the many possibilities ahead".

Dawson's debut performance as Ahsoka Tano was met with praise. Vanderbilt noted "Ahsoka is undoubtedly an appealing character". Phillips stated "Rosario Dawson is so good as Tano". TVLine named Dawson a "Performer of the Week" for her performance, saying she "truly embodied the heretofore-animated hero". In referring to her appearance, Malone stated "Thankfully, Star Wars vet Dave Filoni rose to the task with near flawless execution". Writing for Entertainment.ie, Brian Lloyd stated:"Rosario Dawson more than capable of bringing a physical component to Ahsoka Tano, and making her seem like a legitimate threat". Writing for Comicbookmovie.com, Josh Wilding favorably compared her performance to Ashley Eckstein, the original voice actress, saying "you'll definitely be left craving more of this interpretation of Anakin Skywalker's former apprentice".

The revelation that The Child's real name is Grogu was met with mixed responses. Rebecca Alter for Vulture wrote "The powers that be at Disney+/LucasFilm/the Galactic Empire heard how nobody liked that Baby Yoda's 'official name' is 'The Child,' and decided to… absolutely double-down with a way more ridiculous official name". Writing for TheWrap, Phil Owen heavily criticized the name, saying "This revelation might have completely destroyed the appeal of Baby Yoda for me". Malone also disliked the name, stating "Grogu is the kind of cringy name that flies in the face of how adorable this fella is".

Timothy Zahn, the author who created Grand Admiral Thrawn for The Thrawn Trilogy, was unaware of Thrawn's mention in the episode until he was notified about it by fans, who posted on social media speculating about the character's possible return.

=== Accolades ===
Year	Award	Category	Nominee(s)	Result	Ref.
2021	American Society of Cinematographers Awards	Outstanding Achievement in Cinematography in an Episode of a Half-Hour Television Series	Baz Idoine	Won	
2021	Art Directors Guild Awards	Excellence in Production Design for a One-Hour Period or Fantasy Single-Camera Series	Andrew L. Jones and Doug Chiang	Won	
2021	Cinema Audio Society Awards	Television Series – 1/2 Hour	Production Mixer: Shawn Holden; Re-Recording Mixers: Bonnie Wild and Stephen Urata; Scoring Mixer: Christopher Fogel; ADR Mixer: Matthew Wood; Foley Mixer: Jason Butler	Nominated	
2021	Costume Designers Guild Awards	Excellence in Sci-Fi/Fantasy Television	Shawna Trpcic	Nominated	
2021	Hugo Awards	Hugo Award for Best Dramatic Presentation, Short Form	Dave Filoni (director, screenplay)	Nominated	
2021	Motion Picture Sound Editors Awards	Outstanding Achievement in Sound Editing – Episodic Short Form – Dialogue/ADR	Supervising Sound Editors: Matthew Wood and David Acord; Dialogue Editor: Richard Quinn; ADR Editor: James Spencer	Won	
2021	Motion Picture Sound Editors Awards	Outstanding Achievement in Sound Editing – Episodic Short Form – Effects/Foley	Supervising Sound Editors: David Acord and Matthew Wood; Sound Effects Editors: Benjamin A. Burtt and J.R. Grubbs; Foley Editor: Richard Gould; Foley Artists: Ronni Brown and Jana Vance	Won	
2021	Primetime Creative Arts Emmy Awards	Outstanding Production Design for a Narrative Period or Fantasy Program (One Hour or More)	Andrew L. Jones, Doug Chiang, David Lazan, and Amanda Serino	Nominated	
2021	Primetime Creative Arts Emmy Awards	Outstanding Cinematography for a Single-Camera Series (One Hour)	Baz Idoine	Nominated	
2021	Primetime Creative Arts Emmy Awards	Outstanding Fantasy/Sci-Fi Costumes	Shawna Trpcic, Julie Robar, and Sara Fox	Nominated	
2021	Primetime Creative Arts Emmy Awards	Outstanding Single-Camera Picture Editing for a Drama Series	Andrew S. Eisen	Nominated	
2021	Primetime Creative Arts Emmy Awards	Outstanding Prosthetic Makeup	Brian Sipe, Alexei Dmitriew, Samantha Ward, Scott Stoddard, Pepe Mora, Cale Thomas, Carlton Coleman, and Scott Patton	Won	
2021	Primetime Creative Arts Emmy Awards	Outstanding Sound Editing for a Comedy or Drama Series (One-Hour)	Matthew Wood, David Acord, Richard Quinn, James Spencer, Benjamin A. Burtt, J. R. Grubbs, Richard Gould, Stephanie McNally, Ronni Brown, and Jana Vance	Nominated	
2021	Primetime Creative Arts Emmy Awards	Outstanding Sound Mixing for a Comedy or Drama Series (One-Hour)	Bonnie Wild, Stephen Urata, Shawn Holden, and Christopher Fogel	Won	
2021	Primetime Emmy Awards	Outstanding Writing for a Drama Series	Dave Filoni	Nominated	
2021	Visual Effects Society Awards	Outstanding Animated Character in an Episode or Real-Time Project	John Rosengrant, Peter Clarke, Scott Patton, and Hal Hickel	Won	

== Spin-off ==
A limited series titled Ahsoka, featuring Dawson reprising her role as Ahsoka Tano, was revealed in December 2020 with Filoni writing and executive producing alongside Favreau. The series is set within The Mandalorian's timeline and is planned to culminate in a "climactic story event" with other spin-offs from The Mandalorian.
