= Star Wars: Aftermath trilogy =

Trilogy of science fiction novels by Chuck Wendig

Star Wars: Aftermath
- First edition cover of book one, Star Wars: Aftermath (2015)
- Star Wars: Aftermath (2015); Star Wars: Aftermath: Life Debt (2016); Star Wars: Aftermath: Empire's End (2017)
- Author: Chuck Wendig
- Cover artist: Christopher M. Zucker
- Country: United States
- Language: English
- Genre: Science fiction
- Publisher: Del Rey Books
- Published: 2015–2017
- Media type: Print (hardback & paperback) • e-book • audiobook
- No. of books: 3

Star Wars: Aftermath is a trilogy of Star Wars science fiction novels by American author Chuck Wendig. Set soon after the events of the 1983 film Return of the Jedi, the series explores the time period between that film and 2015's The Force Awakens. The trilogy began in 2015 with Aftermath, which was followed by the sequels Aftermath: Life Debt (2016) and Aftermath: Empire's End (2017). Aftermath is one of the projects in "Journey to Star Wars: The Force Awakens", a 2015 Star Wars publishing initiative to connect The Force Awakens with previous film installments.

The Aftermath trilogy features the characters Wedge Antilles, an X-wing fighter pilot from the original Star Wars film trilogy, and Imperial Admiral Rae Sloane, introduced as a captain in John Jackson Miller's 2014 novel A New Dawn. Wendig also introduces several new characters, including ex-Rebel Alliance pilot Norra Wexley, her teenage son Temmin "Snap" Wexley, Temmin's rebuilt B1 battle droid Mister Bones, the Zabrak bounty hunter Jas Emari, and the Imperial turncoat Sinjir Rath Velus, one of the first gay characters in Star Wars canon.

The first novel of the trilogy debuted at No. 4 on The New York Times Best Seller list, and No. 4 on USA Today's best seller list.

== Publication ==
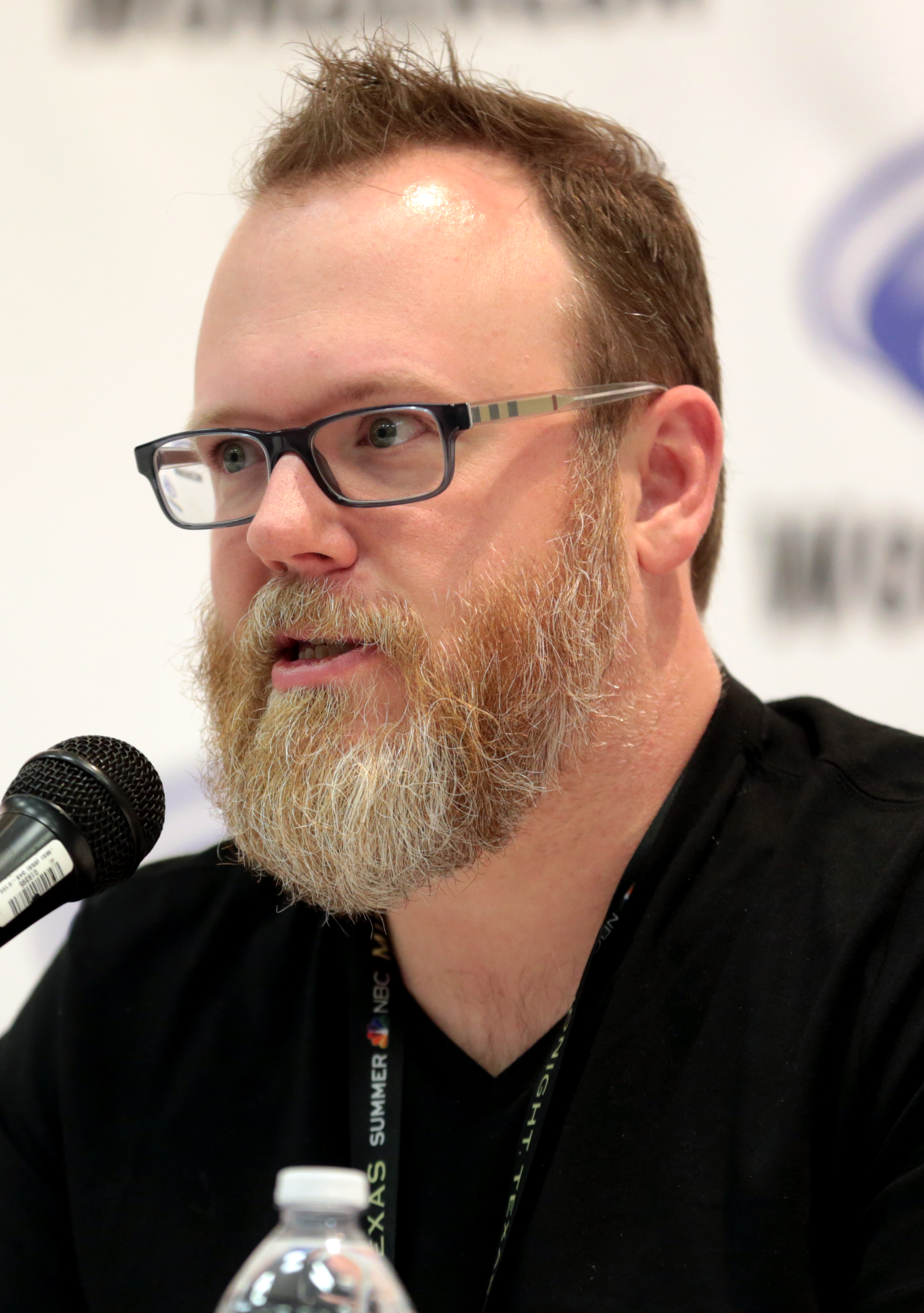
Chuck Wendig wrote all three novels in the Aftermath trilogy.

In March 2015, Disney Publishing Worldwide and Lucasfilm announced the "Journey to Star Wars: The Force Awakens" publishing initiative, a collection of novels and comic books from multiple publishers intended to connect The Force Awakens with previous film installments. Among the first planned releases, the originating 2015 novel Aftermath was subsequently described as being set between the films Return of the Jedi and The Force Awakens. The Hollywood Reporter called the novel "arguably the centerpiece of the Journey line." In July 2015, Del Rey confirmed that Aftermath would be the first novel in a planned trilogy. Aftermath was published on September 4, 2015, and the titles for the other installments—Life Debt and Empire's End—were announced at the New York Comic Con in October 2015. Life Debt was released on July 12, 2016, and Empire's End was released on February 21, 2017.

== Impact ==
Wendig introduces several new characters in Aftermath, including the Zabrak bounty hunter Jas Emari, the Imperial turncoat Sinjir Rath Velus, ex-Rebel pilot Norra Wexley, Norra's teenage son Temmin "Snap" Wexley, and Temmin's rebuilt B1 battle droid Mister Bones.

Acknowledging lesbian Moff Delian Mors from Paul S. Kemp's 2015 novel Star Wars: Lords of the Sith as the first openly gay character in the Star Wars canon, Anthony Breznican of Entertainment Weekly called Aftermath's Sinjir "the first major gay hero" in the franchise. After receiving some fan backlash, Wendig defended the inclusion of a gay character on his blog, writing "If you can imagine a world where Luke Skywalker would be irritated that there were gay people around him, you completely missed the point of Star Wars." The trilogy also introduced secondary character Cobb Vanth, the sheriff of Freetown on the desert planet Tatooine, via an interlude chapter in each of the three novels. Known to have acquired the distinctive armor of Mandalorian bounty hunter Boba Fett, Vanth is portrayed by Timothy Olyphant in season two of the Disney+ series The Mandalorian.

== Works ==
=== Aftermath (2015) ===
Star Wars: Aftermath
- Author: Chuck Wendig
- Audio read by: Marc Thompson
- Cover artist: Christopher M. Zucker
- Language: English
- Series: Star Wars: Aftermath trilogy
- Genre: Science fiction
- Publisher: Del Rey Books
- Publication date: September 4, 2015
- Publication place: United States
- Media type: Print (hardback & paperback) • e-book • audiobook
- Pages: 379 (first edition, hardcover)
- ISBN: 978-0-345-51162-1 (first edition, hardback)
- Followed by: Aftermath: Life Debt

Star Wars: Aftermath is the first novel in Wendig's Aftermath trilogy. It was published by Del Rey Books on September 4, 2015. Aftermath debuted at No. 4 on The New York Times Best Seller list, and No. 4 on USA Today's best seller list.

==== Plot ====
Darth Vader and Emperor Palpatine have fallen and the second Death Star has been destroyed, but the Rebel Alliance—now calling itself the New Republic—has yet to fully subdue the scattered forces of the Empire that remain. Stumbling upon a hub of Imperial activity on the Outer Rim planet Akiva, Rebel pilot Wedge Antilles is captured by Admiral Rae Sloane. Meanwhile, his wartime comrade Norra Wexley has also arrived on the planet to reunite with her teenage son Temmin. Former Imperial officer Sinjir Rath Velus, living quietly on Akiva following the disastrous Battle of Endor, is unhappy to find the Empire at his door, and Zabrak bounty hunter Jas Emari's latest contract leads her to a wealth of valuable targets.

==== Critical reception ====
IGN's Jared Petty awarded the novel a score of 5.9 out of ten, saying "Star Wars: Aftermath is a well-written but ultimately disappointing first look into the post-Endor galaxy."

=== Aftermath: Life Debt (2016) ===
Star Wars: Aftermath: Life Debt
- Author: Chuck Wendig
- Audio read by: Marc Thompson
- Cover artist: Christopher M. Zucker
- Language: English
- Series: Star Wars: Aftermath trilogy
- Genre: Science fiction
- Publisher: Del Rey Books
- Publication date: July 12, 2016
- Publication place: United States
- Media type: Print (hardcover)
- Pages: 448 (first edition, hardcover)
- ISBN: 978-1-101-96693-8 (first edition, hardback)
- Preceded by: Aftermath
- Followed by: Aftermath: Empire's End

Star Wars: Aftermath: Life Debt is the second novel in Wendig's Aftermath trilogy. It was published by Del Rey Books on July 12, 2016.

==== Plot ====
Former Rebel Alliance pilot Norra Wexley, her teenage son Temmin, the Zabrak bounty hunter Jas Emari, the former Imperial officer Sinjir Rath Velus, and the SpecForces officer Jom Barell have become a ragtag team working to collect Imperials whom the New Republic wants to bring to justice. Fresh from their latest mission, the team is asked by General Leia Organa to find her husband Han Solo, who has gone missing during a personal mission to free the Wookiees on the enslaved planet Kashyyyk. The group finds Han and helps him free an imprisoned Chewbacca and a score of longtime Imperial prisoners—among them Norra's husband, Brentin.

Under the secret guidance of the deceased Emperor Palpatine's former advisor, Gallius Rax, Grand Admiral Rae Sloane works to consolidate the remnants of the Empire's forces. Rax reveals the existence of an extensive Imperial fleet, and gathers a selective group of former imperials to form his "Shadow Council". Though their goals seem aligned, Sloane becomes increasingly distrustful of Rax as she begins to discover the extent of his machinations.

With the last minute aid of Leia, Wedge Antilles, and Admiral Ackbar, Han's team frees Kashyyyk from Imperial rule. Meanwhile, as the New Republic celebrates the liberation of the prisoners, Rax's insidious plan comes to fruition. Brainwashed to kill, Brentin and the other prisoners suddenly attack Chancellor Mon Mothma and other New Republic political and military targets, as well as civilians. Disgusted by Rax's tactics and realizing that her attaché Adea Rite is under his command, Sloane flees. Injured by Norra, she aligns herself with Brentin, who is desperate to avenge himself on Rax. They find Rax as he arrives at his homeworld of Jakku with his fleet.

==== Critical reception ====
IGN's Jared Petty awarded the novel a score of 6.8 out of ten, saying "Star Wars Life Debt: Aftermath is an interesting but uneven return to a galaxy far, far away."

=== Aftermath: Empire's End (2017) ===
Star Wars: Aftermath: Empire's End
- Author: Chuck Wendig
- Audio read by: Marc Thompson
- Cover artist: Christopher M. Zucker
- Language: English
- Series: Star Wars: Aftermath trilogy
- Genre: Science fiction
- Publisher: Del Rey Books
- Publication date: February 21, 2017
- Publication place: United States
- Media type: Print (hardcover)
- Pages: 320 (first edition, hardcover)
- ISBN: 978-1-101-96696-9 (first edition, hardback)
- Preceded by: Aftermath: Life Debt

Star Wars: Empire's End is the third novel in Wendig's Aftermath trilogy. It was published by Del Rey Books on February 21, 2017.

==== Plot ====
Using information gleaned from the bounty hunter Mercurial Swift, the team of former Rebel Alliance pilot Norra Wexley, her teenage son Temmin, the Zabrak bounty hunter Jas Emari, and the former Imperial officer Sinjir Rath Velus track Grand Admiral Rae Sloane to the desolate planet Jakku. They arrive to find the remaining Imperial fleet of Star Destroyers in orbit; Norra and Jas head to the surface seeking Sloane, while Temmin and Sinjir escape to Chandrila to alert Leia Organa and the New Republic. Norra and Jas are captured by Imperial stormtroopers; Norra is enslaved, and Jas—who has a bounty on her head—is handed over to the crime lord Niima the Hutt. Temmin's reprogrammed B1 battle droid Mister Bones rescues Norra, and they reunite with an escaped Jas. Sloane and Norra's estranged husband Brentin seek revenge against Gallius Rax, but are captured by him instead. Meanwhile, the indecisive New Republic Senate fails to approve a military offensive against the Imperial forces at Jakku.

Sinjir recruits former SpecForces operative Jom Barell for a covert mission with Temmin, Han Solo, and Sinjir's sometimes lover Conder Kyl to identify the leverage which the Black Sun and Red Key criminal syndicates used to influence the vote. Their efforts provide Chancellor Mon Mothma with the votes she needs, and the motion passes. Led by Admiral Ackbar, the New Republic forces attack with Temmin flying an X-wing under Wedge Antilles' command, and Jom rejoining SpecForces. Sloane and Brentin learn of Rax's insidious program which trains abducted children to be vicious killers. Norra finally intercepts Sloane, but postpones her revenge to join her nemesis in finding out what Rax is protecting in his desert base. The battle turns for the New Republic when the Imperial dreadnought Ravager is destroyed. Mister Bones saves Temmin's life, but the droid is destroyed. Sloane confronts Rax, who has commenced what Palpatine called his "Contingency": the Jakku Observatory will destroy the planet and the entirety of both the Imperial and New Republic forces, plunging the galaxy into chaos. Rax will flee on a predetermined course to the Unknown Regions with a select few Destroyers, where he will create a new empire. Sloane kills Rax and stops Jakku's destruction, but assumes Rax's role as shepherd of Palpatine's plans.

Sinjir becomes an advisor to Mothma, who escapes an assassination attempt, and Brentin and Jom are killed on Jakku. Leia gives birth to Ben Solo, her son with Han, as the Empire formally surrenders. Wedge establishes a flight academy on Hosnian Prime, where he and Norra will be instructors, and Temmin—now officially known as "Snap"—will attend.

==== Critical reception ====
Sean Keane of the New York Daily News called Empire's End a "thrilling conclusion" to the trilogy.
