= Cobb Vanth =

Star Wars character

- Star Wars character
- Timothy Olyphant as Cobb Vanth wearing Boba Fett's armor in a scene from the second season of The Mandalorian
- First appearance: Aftermath (2015)
- Created by: Chuck Wendig
- Adapted by: Jon Favreau; Dave Filoni
- Portrayed by: Timothy Olyphant
- Voiced by: Marc Thompson

In-universe information
- Full name: Cobb Vanth
- Alias: Cobb Vance
- Nickname: The Marshal
- Species: Human
- Gender: Male
- Title: The Marshal of Freetown (formerly the Sheriff of Mos Pelgo)
- Occupation: Marshal / sheriff; former slave
- Affiliation: Mos Pelgo / Freetown
- Home: Tatooine
- Partner: Malakili (formerly)

Cobb Vanth (also known as The Sheriff and later The Marshal) is a fictional character in the Star Wars franchise. Introduced in the 2015–2017 Chuck Wendig novel trilogy Aftermath, he is a former slave who has used the Mandalorian armor of Boba Fett to bring order to Tatooine "Freetown" Mos Pelgo in the five years after the events of the 1983 film Return of the Jedi. Throughout the trilogy, Cobb faces off against foes such as the Red Key Raiders mining collective, the Tusken Raiders, and a krayt dragon.

The character reappears in the second season of the Disney+ television series The Mandalorian, set years after the events of the Aftermath trilogy and depicting Cobb joining forces with the Tuskens and the series' title character to finally defeat the krayt dragon. He is portrayed by Timothy Olyphant, who reprised the role in spin-off series The Book of Boba Fett, where Cobb faces off against the Pyke Syndicate and their representative, Cad Bane.

== Character ==
Cobb first appeared in the 2015 Chuck Wendig novel Aftermath, the first installment of what became known as the Aftermath trilogy, via an interlude chapter in each of the three novels; named as a reference to The Office supporting character Bob Vance, his name is often misspelled "Cobb Vance" in certain chapters throughout the Aftermath trilogy. He is a former Imperial slave and sheriff/marshal of the town of Mos Pelgo/Freetown.

=== Portrayal ===
Cobb is voiced by Marc Thompson in the audiobook for the Aftermath trilogy, and played by Timothy Olyphant in the second season of The Mandalorian and its spin-off series The Book of Boba Fett.

== Appearances ==
=== Aftermath trilogy (2015–2017) ===
The Aftermath trilogy was written by Chuck Wendig between 2015 and 2017. In addition to Cobb, the trilogy introduced several notable characters, including Norra and Snap Wexley. Beginning immediately after the events depicted in Return of the Jedi and concluding one year later with the Battle of Jakku, the Rebel Alliance, now known as the New Republic, fights the remnants of the Galactic Empire, as they consolidate behind Gallius Rax and Rae Sloane in two separate factions; Rax seeking to become the new Emperor, and Sloane seeking to form a more peaceful "first order". On Tatooine, various mining syndicates take advantage of the decreased Imperial presence and vacuum left by the death of Jabba the Hutt to take control over several settlements from which they demand tribute; Cobb Vanth, a former slave-turned-lawman, decides to take a stand against them.

In Aftermath (2015), Adwin Charu, a representative for the Red Key Raiders crime syndicate that sprouts up on Tatooine after the death of Jabba the Hutt, meets with a group of Jawas for some mining equipment, as the syndicate wants to work under the guise of being a mining company, yet cannot come to any agreement with the Jawas. Cobb Vanth, present on the Jawas' vehicle, presents himself as someone willing to help Adwin find purchases for the collective, as Cobb has a rapport with the creatures. After examining the wreckage of Jabba's barge, recovered from a Sarlacc recently eaten by a krayt dragon, the pair come across some Mandalorian armor, both pulling blasters upon the other in seeking to acquire it, with Cobb shooting Adwin. Cobb orders the injured Adwin to tell the rest of the Red Key Raiders to cease their operations or he will come for them, then leaves with the armor.

Life Debt (2016) reveals that Cobb has since become the sheriff of the town Mos Pelgo after liberating it from the Red Key Raiders' mining collective, continuing to wear the Mandalorian armor and take a stand against the Red Key Raiders' forces. Meeting Malakili, the former beastmaster for Jabba, framed for killing a group of Red Key Raiders, Cobb agrees to accompany Malakili – and the infant heir of Jabba he is protecting – Borgo – back to Mos Pelgo (also known as Freetown) to start a different life.

In Empire's End (2017), Cobb and Malakili continue to work together to create a deal with the Tusken Raiders to keep the town protected. The Tusken Raiders agree, due to the town being in a sacred location and having a Hutt, and themselves being promised the pearl from inside a krayt dragon. However, Red Key members capture the town before the krayt dragon can be killed, reducing Cobb's arsenal to such an extent that he is no longer able to try to kill it. While held captive, Cobb is revealed to have once been a slave, having slave markings on his back. Soon enough, the Tusken Raiders come and free Cobb from the Red Key members. They then drive out the crime syndicate, and Cobb vows to continue protecting the town.

In the time between Empire's End and The Mandalorian, however, the town has turned against the Tusken Raiders, and Malakili leaves with the Hutt.

=== The Mandalorian (2020) ===
In May 2020, it was reported that Timothy Olyphant would appear as Cobb Vanth in the second season of The Mandalorian, potentially confirming the character's Mandalorian armor from the Aftermath trilogy to have been that of Boba Fett. In the second season's premiere, "Chapter 9: The Marshal", the show's title character arrives in Mos Pelgo looking for a Mandalorian and is surprised to find Cobb instead, who is wearing Fett's Mandalorian armor. Following a brief standoff, after which Cobb summarises how he acquired the armor, he offers to give his armor to the Mandalorian in exchange for his assistance in killing the krayt dragon he failed to kill in the Aftermath trilogy, allying with the Tusken Raiders once again to do so. Thanks to an ingenious idea by the Mandalorian to use a bantha as a suicide bomber and have it detonate once the dragon eats it, which nearly results in failure and the Mandalorian's death, they manage to kill the dragon, obtaining a pearl in the process. Following this, Cobb honors their agreement by giving up the armor to the Mandalorian, and the two part on good terms.

=== The Book of Boba Fett (2022) ===
Cobb Vanth, played again by Timothy Olyphant, returns in The Book of Boba Fett, a spin-off series of The Mandalorian. He first appears in the sixth episode, titled "Chapter 6: From the Desert Comes a Stranger", where he faces a new threat to Mos Pelgo (renamed Freetown), namely the Pyke Syndicate, who are trying to conquer Tatooine. After Cobb confronts and shoots several Pykes, the syndicate retaliates by sending bounty hunter Cad Bane to deal with him. Before Bane arrives, Cobb is visited by the Mandalorian, who enlists his and his people's help in the upcoming war between Boba Fett's crime syndicate and the Pykes. Cobb is reluctant to get involved but agrees to hold a town hall meeting. Shortly after the Mandalorian leaves Freetown, Bane arrives to demand that Cobb take a neutral stance in the upcoming war. After explaining Fett's prior involvement with the Empire, Bane shoots Cobb and his deputy after a showdown, killing the latter and leaving Cobb's fate uncertain.

Cobb is revealed to have survived in the mid-credits scene of "Chapter 7: In the Name of Honor", where he is seen recovering in Fett's bacta tank while the mod artist who saved Fennec Shand's life after she was similarly wounded prepares to apply cybernetic enhancements to him.

== Reception ==
Upon the character's initial appearance in the Aftermath trilogy, speculation was common as to the character's Mandalorian armor belonging to Boba Fett, or the character themselves being a disguised Fett; the former theory was proven true in the second season of The Mandalorian. Olyphant's portrayal of Cobb in The Mandalorian was generally praised, with Rachel Leishman of The Mary Sue describing the character's backstory of acquiring the armor of Fett as "[h]onestly, iconic", and Comic Book Resources drawing comparisons of Olyphant's portrayal to "basically [his Justified character] Raylan Givens... in Space". TechRadar additionally expressed interest in seeing a spin-off developed around the character.

Olyphant's performance as Vanth in the second season of The Mandalorian earned him a nomination for the Primetime Emmy Award for Outstanding Guest Actor in a Drama Series.
