= Chuck Wendig =

American writer (born 1976)

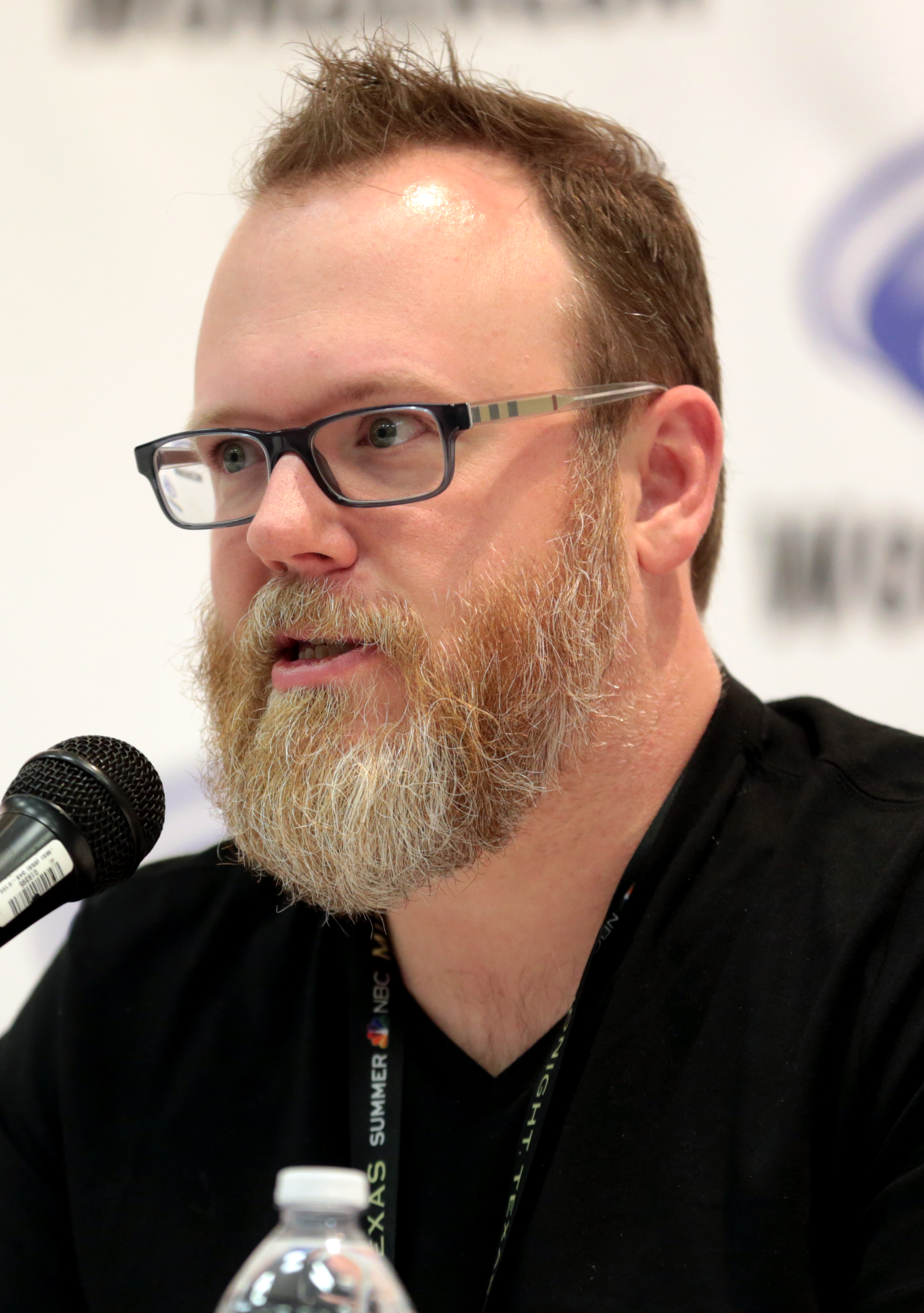
- Wendig at WonderCon 2017
- Born: Charles David Wendig; April 22, 1976 (age 50)
- Education: Queens University of Charlotte
- Occupations: Author; screenwriter; blogger
- Writing career
- Language: English
- Genres: Urban fantasy; science fiction
- Website: terribleminds.com

Charles David Wendig (nicknamed Chuck Wendig; born April 22, 1976) is an American author, comic book writer, screenwriter, and blogger. He is best known for the Star Wars: Aftermath trilogy.

== Early life ==
Wendig grew up in New Hope, Pennsylvania. He studied English and religion at Queens University of Charlotte and graduated in 1998.

== Career ==
Wendig's short film, Pandemic 41.410806, −75.654259, co-written and directed by Lance Weiler, was selected for the 2011 Sundance Short Film Program.

In 2015, Archie Comics announced a new comic series co-written by Wendig and Adam Christopher, featuring a new version of their superhero The Shield.

Wendig was chosen in October 2015 as the writer of new Marvel ongoing comic book series Hyperion, based on the version of the character that appeared in Jonathan Hickman's run on Avengers, alongside artist Nik Virella.

During the ComicsPRO 2016 annual meeting, Marvel Comics announced a five-issue comic book adaptation of Star Wars: The Force Awakens, to be co-written by Wendig and illustrated by Luke Ross, launching in June 2016.

In 2018, Marvel fired Wendig. According to Wendig, he was fired for "uncivil" tweets attacking Republicans and the GOP over the confirmation of Associate Supreme Court Justice Brett Kavanaugh.

== Bibliography ==
=== Gods & Monsters ===
- Unclean Spirits (2013)

=== Mookie Pearl ===
- The Blue Blazes (2013)
- The Hellsblood Bride (2015)

=== Spirit of the Century Universe ===
- Dinocalypse Now (2012)
- Beyond Dinocalypse (2013)

=== Star Wars Universe ===
- Aftermath Trilogy
  - Aftermath (2015)
  - Life Debt (2016)
  - Empire's End (2017)
- From a Certain Point of View
  - "We Don't Serve Their Kind Here" (2017) [SF]

=== The Heartland Trilogy ===
- Under the Empyrean Sky (2013)
- Blightborn (2014)
- The Harvest (2015)

Short story:

- The Wind Has Teeth Tonight (2014) [SF]

=== Tomes of the Dead ===
- Double Dead (2011)
- Bad Blood (2012) [SF]
- The Complete Double Dead (2016) [O/1,2]

=== Wanderers ===
- Wanderers (2019)
- Wayward (2022)

=== The Miriam Black series ===
- Blackbirds (2012)
- Mockingbird (2012)
- The Cormorant (2013)
- Thunderbird (2017)
- The Raptor & the Wren (2018)
- Vultures (2019)

=== Standalone novels ===
- Zer0es (2015)
- Invasive (2016)
- The Book of Accidents (2021)
- Dust & Grim (2021)
- Black River Orchard (2023)
- Monster Movie! (2024)
- The Staircase in the Woods (2025)
- The Calamities (2026)

=== Collections ===
- Irregular Creatures (2011)
