= Greef Karga =

Fictional character from Star Wars

- Star Wars character
- Carl Weathers as Greef Karga in The Mandalorian
- First appearance: "Chapter 1: The Mandalorian"; The Mandalorian; (2019)
- Last appearance: Lego Star Wars: The Mandalorian (2026)
- Created by: Jon Favreau
- Portrayed by: Carl Weathers
- Voiced by: Carl Lumbly

In-universe information
- Species: Human
- Gender: Male
- Occupation: Leader of the Bounty Hunters' Guild; High Magistrate of Nevarro
- Affiliation: Bounty Hunters' Guild

High Magistrate Greef Karga is a fictional character in the Star Wars franchise who appears in the Disney+ television series The Mandalorian. A former leader of the Bounty Hunters' Guild, he provides the show's title character with the bounty that leads him to meet Grogu, an alien infant also known as "The Child" and "Baby Yoda" by fans. Greef serves as both an ally and adversary to the Mandalorian at different points in the first season, and returns as an ally in the second and third seasons.

Greef Karga was created by Jon Favreau, the creator and showrunner of The Mandalorian. The character was originally planned only to appear in a handful of episodes, but Favreau and the writers liked the character so much that the role was expanded. Greef is portrayed by Carl Weathers, whom Favreau knew through the Directors Guild of America. Weathers accepted the part under the condition that he could direct future episodes of The Mandalorian; Weathers directed the episodes "Chapter 12: The Siege", which was Greef's only appearance in the show's second season, and the season three episode "Chapter 20: The Foundling". Following Weathers' death, the role was taken over by Carl Lumbly from Lego Star Wars: The Mandalorian onward.

Elements of the character's background have deliberately been kept mysterious, though it was revealed in the first-season finale that he was previously a disgraced government official, and Weathers said his backstory would be further developed in the second season. Weathers performed his stunts for The Mandalorian. He has described the role as "one of the greatest things that's happened in all of the years that I've been in entertainment". Greef has received generally positive feedback from fans and reviewers. For his performance in the second season, Weathers was nominated for the Primetime Emmy Award for Outstanding Guest Actor in a Drama Series.

== Appearances ==
=== Backstory ===
Greef Karga is a leader of the Bounty Hunters' Guild, an organization that regulates the activities of bounty hunters, assigns bounties to specific individuals, and ensures its members follow the guild's rules. Little of Greef's backstory has been revealed as of the end of the first season, but in the first-season finale, it is revealed he was previously a government official with the title "magistrate" before losing the position in disgrace. Carl Weathers, the actor who portrays Greef, has said additional backstory details will be provided in the show's second season.

=== Season 1 ===
Greef first appears in the series premiere, "Chapter 1: The Mandalorian", where he operates out of a bar on the planet Nevarro. He is first seen when the Mandalorian collects payment from him for several bounties he collected. Greef then informs the Mandalorian about a lucrative job from a mysterious man known only as "The Client", who insists on meeting with the Mandalorian face to face. This job turns out to be a bounty against Grogu, aka "The Child", a young alien of the same unnamed species as Yoda.

Greef next appears in "Chapter 3: The Sin", during which he informs the Mandalorian to bring the captured Grogu directly to the Client. The Mandalorian does so, only to later rescue Grogu back from the Client, who is an agent of the Galactic Empire. This is a violation of the Bounty Hunters' Guild code, so Greef organizes a group of bounty hunters to confront the Mandalorian and get Grogu back. A massive gunfight ensues, in which most of Greef's bounty hunters are killed when the Mandalorian receives assistance from a group of fellow Mandalorian warriors. Greef himself escapes and confronts the Mandalorian at his ship, the Razor Crest, but the Mandalorian shoots him off his boarding ramp before flying away. Greef only survives because he had two ingots of beskar, a rare steel that the Client provided as payment for the Grogu's bounty, inside his vest pocket where he was shot.

The season's penultimate episode, "Chapter 7: The Reckoning", opens with the Mandalorian receiving a message from Greef, who proposes that if the Mandalorian helps eliminate the Imperial presence on Nevarro, Greef will ensure the Bounty Hunters' Guild no longer seeks out the Mandalorian or Grogu. The offer is a trap, and Greef plans to ambush and kill the Mandalorian and return Grogu to the Client. Nevertheless, the Mandalorian accepts Greef's offer, bringing along with him Cara Dune, Kuiil, and IG-11 to assist in the mission. During their voyage, the party is attacked by pterodactyl-like creatures, and Greef receives a poisonous slash that would have been fatal, but Grogu uses the Force to heal him. Greef is so moved that he has a change of heart and informs the others about the trap. They devise a new plan in which they leave Grogu behind, bring the Mandalorian to the Imperials as if he is a prisoner, and then attempt to eliminate them.

The plan goes wrong, resulting in the trio becoming pinned down inside a bar by Imperial officer Moff Gideon and his stormtroopers. At the start of the first-season finale "Chapter 8: Redemption", the group engages in a brief gunfight with the stormtroopers after the IG-11 arrives with Grogu to provide assistance. The group escapes the building via the sewer system, where they travel to a hidden Mandalorian covert and find most of the warriors there have already been killed by the Empire. The Mandalorian initially blames Greef for this, believing the Bounty Hunters' Guild responsible, until a fellow Mandalorian leader known as the Armorer persuades him otherwise. The group then flees on a droid-controlled floating barge on a river of lava. Greef is present when IG-11 sacrifices himself to eliminate a large number of stormtroopers to ensure the group's escape, and he survives an attack by Moff Gideon in a TIE fighter, which the Mandalorian repels. Afterward, Greef decides to stay behind on Nevarro and rebuild the Bounty Hunters' Guild, and he invites Cara Dune to work as his enforcer, which she accepts.

=== Season 2 ===
The character was confirmed to return in the second season of The Mandalorian ahead of its premiere. Greef appears in "Chapter 12: The Siege", the first episode in the show directed by Carl Weathers. Now the magistrate of Nevarro, he worked to eliminate all Imperial forces on the planet, aided by Cara as his marshal and an unnamed Mythrol as his assistant. When the Mandalorian and Grogu return to Nevarro for repairs to the Razor Crest, they reunite with Greef and Cara, who present to them some of the changes made to the place, before inviting the former to join them on a raid on the last Imperial base on the planet in exchange for the repairs. The base turns out to have more than just a skeleton crew, as the group finds numerous stormtroopers patrolling its corridors. They deactivate the lava cooling system so that the natural lava flows will destroy the base. During their escape, the group finds scientists and vats of what appear to be cloned bodies. The scientists attempt to destroy the evidence, but before they can do so, the Mythrol uncovers a recording from Dr. Pershing that reveals he had been transfusing Grogu's blood, which has a high 'M-count', into test subjects. Stormtroopers soon swarm the team and they are forced to escape before the lava overheats and destroys the base.

The Mandalorian flies from the base to retrieve his ship, using his jetpack, whilst Greef, Cara, and Mythrol steal a stormtrooper transport. A chase ensues between the transport, driven by Cara, and scout troopers riding speeder bikes. Greef kills the last scout trooper, but TIE fighters launched from the base chase after them, disabling the transport's cannon. The base soon explodes due to the overheating of the lava. As the TIE fighters close in on Greef, Cara, and Mythrol, the Razor Crest appears and destroys the Imperials. After the Mandalorian receives the promised repairs to his ship and departs from Nevarro once again with Grogu, Greef is visited by New Republic pilots, who invite him to help stop whatever the Empire is planning.

=== Season 3 ===
Greef appears in season 3, where Weathers again directs an episode. He first appears in the season premiere, "Chapter 17: The Apostate", when The Mandalorian returns to Nevarro in hope of retrieving IG-11. Greef, who is now Nevarro's High Magistrate is later confronted by pirates. In a stand off, Greef wounds one of them, as he wants them to inform the others that Nevarro is no longer a haven for Pirates. The two attempt to revive IG-11, and are successful, though he reverts to his original programming, attempting to kill Grogu. Greef leads The Mandalorian to Anzellans, who inform him that he needs a memory core to fix IG-11. Greef agrees to protect IG-11 as The Mandalorian heads off to find a memory core.

In "Chapter 21: The Pirate", Gorian Shard attacks Nevarro, seeking revenge on Greef for killing one of his men. The people of Nevarro are forced to flee the city, and Greef sends a distress signal to the New Republic. This is rejected, but Carson Teva alerts the Mandalorian who agrees to, with help from his Mandalorian forces, assist Greef in taking down Gorian Shard's ship and forces, and eventually killing Shard. Greef thanks the Mandalorian, and offers the Mandalorians a home on Nevarro.

In "Chapter 23: The Spies", Greef gifts the Mandalorian with IG-12, a rebuilt IG-11 which now serves as a mech suit for Grogu, allowing him to communicate saying "yes" or "no".

=== Lego Star Wars: The Mandalorian ===
Greef (now voiced by Carl Lumbly) returns in the Lego Star Wars: The Mandalorian animated special, where he attends the Mandalorian's birthday party after the events of The Mandalorian and Grogu.

== Characterization ==
Greef Karga has a gruff personality and a no-nonsense approach to business. He projects a calm and confident demeanor, and is motivated largely by financial profit, but is also fair in his dealings. He is loyal to his allies to some degree, but can also be duplicitous and shifting in his allegiances, as seen by the way in which he repeatedly switches between friend and adversary to the Mandalorian. Anthony Breznican of Vanity Fair felt Greef simultaneously protected and manipulated the Mandalorian at times, and that Mandalorian did not fully trust him as a result. Weathers has described his character as "a combination of a used car salesman and a puppeteer". KGO-TV writers Janet Davies and Marsha Jordan described Greef as a "shadowy underworld figure". Weathers said the character has "something that you can't quite trust", but also said he is "definitely not amoral". Greef is a mysterious character, and Weathers has said it was a conscious decision by the writers to keep aspects of his history and motivations cryptic: "There's some real strong indications that give you some idea of who he is, but we never let on completely." Greef has a very theatrical and sometimes over-the-top personality, enjoys action and the company of bounty hunters, over whom he exerts strict control through his leadership role in the Bounty Hunters' Guild. Although normally self-assured and confident, Greef does act cautiously and sometimes even fearfully in some situations, such as his interaction with the Client.

== Concept and creation ==
=== Conception ===
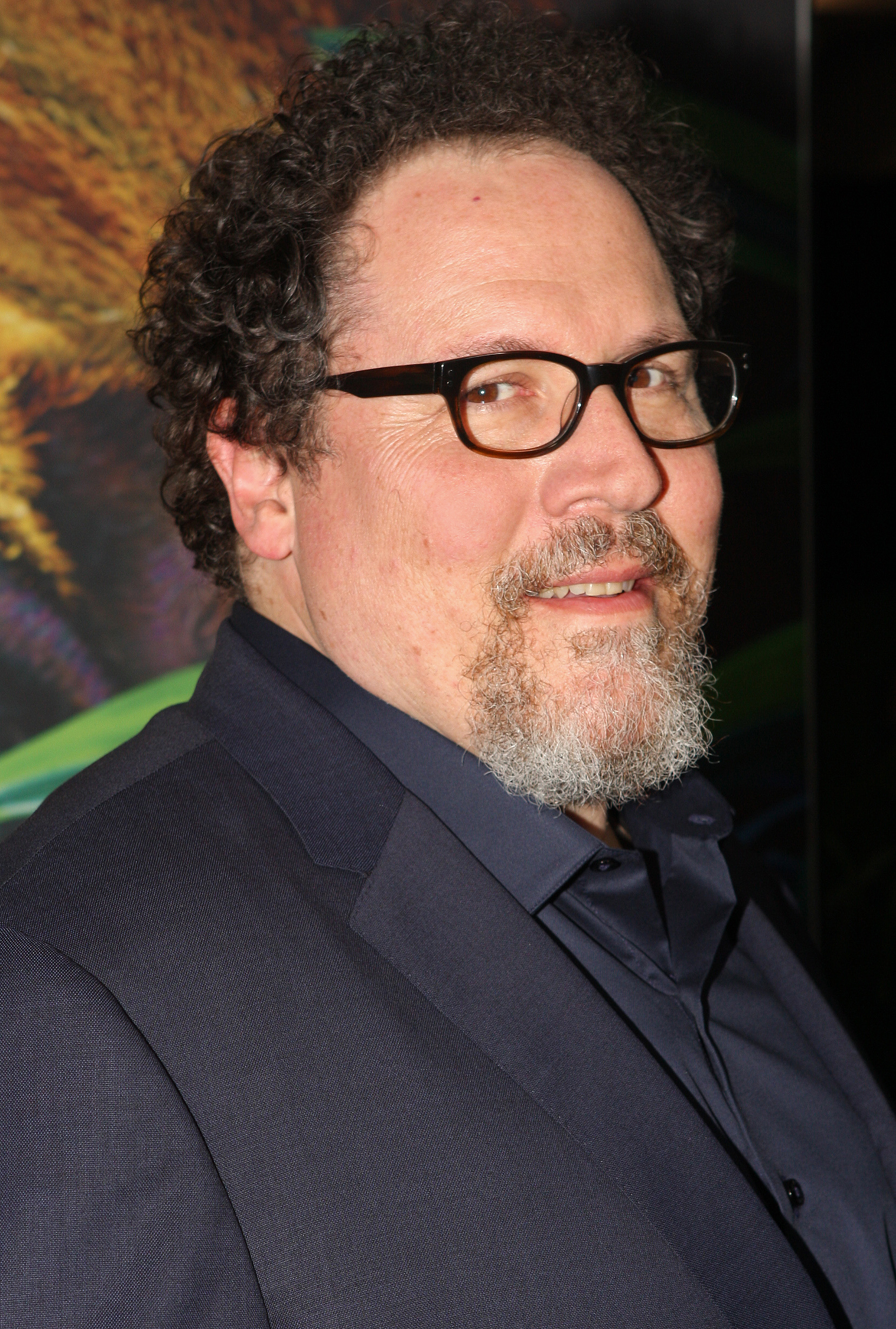
Greef Karga was created by Jon Favreau, the creator and showrunner of The Mandalorian.

The character of Greef Karga was created by Jon Favreau, the creator and showrunner of The Mandalorian. He was originally planned to make a brief appearance in the series, but Favreau and the series writers found that they liked the character so much that they expanded his part and gave him a larger role. Karga was initially envisioned as a Weequay, a species first seen on Return of the Jedi (1983), but Favreau and his crew concluded that they didn't wish to have Karga's performance hidden behind a mask.

Greef Karga was first publicly unveiled during the Star Wars Celebration convention in Chicago on April 14, 2019, along with the character Cara Dune. The event also featured teaser footage featuring Greef, a still photo of the character, and included a panel discussion with Carl Weathers and Gina Carano, the actress who portrays Cara, discussing their characters. A fully finished scene of Greef offering a bounty to the Mandalorian was also screened. It was the first time Weathers had seen finalized footage from the show, after which he said: "How can you not react to that? It's beautiful hearing the fans react to it."

During the panel, Weathers said of his character: "He's kind of the head of this guild of bounty hunters. There seems to be a lot of kind of nefarious people." Some publications misspelled Karga's name after the event, with Anthony Gramuglia of Comic Book Resources calling him "Greif Marda", and Variety writer Jordan Moreau misspelling the last name as "Carga". Further footage of the character was included in the first trailer of The Mandalorian. which debuted at the D23 convention on August 23, 2019. According to Adrienne Tyler of Screen Rant, some viewers mistook images of Greef Carga in the trailer for Lando Calrissian, a Star Wars character who dates back to the original Star Wars trilogy. On October 28, a character poster of The Mandalorian solely featuring Greef Karga was released.

=== Portrayal ===
Favreau, who offered the part to Weathers, was a fan of the actor and had previously met Weathers through their mutual membership in the Directors Guild of America; Favreau began courting him for The Mandalorian early in the process of preparing for the series. Weathers said Favreau "did sort of a slow roll on me", describing the project to him and impressing the actor with his passion for the show. Weathers met with Favreau to discuss the Greef Karga character, with Favreau showing him concept art from the series, which Weathers described as "magnificent" and "some of the most beautiful artwork". He was also impressed with Dave Filoni, the executive director for The Mandalorian, saying of him and Favreau: "We're in really good hands." Although Weathers originally signed on for only a few episodes, the character was later expanded and the role grew larger than what he initially accepted. Favreau said: "We really did rope him in." Weathers agreed to accept the part if he could have the opportunity to direct future episodes of The Mandalorian if it was renewed for a second season, to which Favreau agreed. As a result, Weathers directed the season 2 episode "Chapter 12: The Siege" of The Mandalorian thus becoming the second cast member of The Mandalorian to direct an episode of the show, after IG-11 actor Taika Waititi. Weathers also later directed the season 3 episode, Chapter 20: The Foundling.

Upon first reading the part, Weathers said Greef Karga reminded him of film director, screenwriter, and actor John Huston, particularly his performance in the film Chinatown (1974). He felt there was a theatricality and "larger than life" quality to the character, and he deliberately performed some of his lines in a showy and melodramatic way as a result. Weathers' casting was first announced on December 12, 2018, though rumors had been discussed on the Making Star Wars podcast and other Internet sites two months prior to the formal announcement. Weathers called The Mandalorian one of the "most exciting projects" of his career, saying: "Being a part of this is one of the greatest things that's happened in all of the years that I've been in entertainment." He said he was very impressed by the quality of writing in the scripts, and that he particularly enjoyed his character's shifting allegiances and unpredictable about-faces: "It's much more interesting to play someone who is not all of one thing, not one-dimensional. ... Certainly with Greef, you have to really keep your eye on him."

Weathers said he knew little about Greef Karga's backstory before playing the character, and that he did not want to know it because he felt the mystery helped him convey a sense of ambiguity. Regarding Greef's history, Weathers said, "I didn't ask it. I didn't care. I didn't want to know." However, he also added: "If I had to guess, he was going through some dark times. He was doing maybe some pretty dark stuff."

Following Weathers' death, the role of Greef Karta was assumed by Carl Lumbly, beginning with the Lego Star Wars: The Mandalorian animated special.

=== Filming ===
There was a great deal of secrecy surrounding the filming of The Mandalorian, and Weathers was not allowed to divulge any details about the series. In the early months, he was not even allowed to reveal that he was appearing in the show. He joked: "I had to cut my finger and sign in blood that I would say nothing about it." The actor said his time filming The Mandalorian has been a positive experience, describing it as: "a liberating experience when you have so many smart, talented, collaborative, good-hearted, caring people around you on a daily basis". Weathers performed his stunts for The Mandalorian. He said he has pushed for diversity in the casting of The Mandalorian, not only based upon race but also such factors as height, age, and physical appearance: "I want to see anything that we have experienced in the world to be in that universe, because they're disparate creatures coming from every part of the universe. So why wouldn't they be there?" After filming each episode, Weathers liked to watch the footage and study what the director and actors brought to each scene.

Weathers said he particularly enjoyed working with the director Deborah Chow during the filming of "Chapter 3: The Sin", because she had planned what she wanted to do for the episode very precisely and meticulously in advance. He said this took a lot of pressure off of him and the rest of the cast, giving them more freedom and helping ensure their own choices were in sync with hers. Weathers' action sequences in "Chapter 3: The Sin" took a particularly long time to film due to the many elements involved in the shootout scene. In Greef Karga's scenes with the Client, played by German film director Werner Herzog, Weathers deliberately made Greef less confident and commanding than normal to convey that the Client was a dangerous character. He was a great admirer of Herzog, referring to him as "maestro" on the set of The Mandalorian, and the two had extensive conversations with each other about Herzog's past films and his relationship with actor Klaus Kinski.

== Cultural impact ==
=== Critical reception ===
Greef Karga has received generally positive feedback from fans and reviewers. Screen Rant ranked him sixth on a list of the best characters from the first season of The Mandalorian, as well as on a separate list of the most interesting characters from the season. Vulture writer Keith Phipps praised the character, writing "Just the way he says 'Mando!' is a delight", a reference to the Mandalorian's nickname. Kevin Pantoja of Screen Rant complimented Weathers' performance, who he said is "always awesome". Fans particularly enjoyed Greef's line "Do the magic hand thing!", which he says to Grogu in the season finale while trying to encourage him to use the Force against their enemies. Nobelle Borines of Epicstream called it his "most iconic line" of the season. After the first season concluded, Weathers thanked his fans for their support, writing: "Your enjoyment and appreciation for the work done by the creators, directors, cast and crew fills us all with pride. Until fall of 2020, 'Do the magic hand thing, baby'!" Greef Karga's costume was ranked tenth on a Screen Rant list of the ten best costumes in the first season of The Mandalorian.

=== Merchandise ===
A Funko Pop figurine of Greef Karga was announced on December 31, 2019. Lego produced a minfigure of Greef Karga, included in the 2020 set 75292, the Razor Crest.

=== Video games ===
Karga became a playable character in the game Star Wars: Galaxy of Heroes on April 22, 2020. Furthermore, he was added to Lego Star Wars: The Skywalker Saga as a downloadable character.
