= The Client (Star Wars) =

Star Wars character

- Star Wars character
- Werner Herzog as The Client in The Mandalorian
- First appearance: "Chapter 1: The Mandalorian"; The Mandalorian; November 12, 2019
- Last appearance: "Chapter 7: The Reckoning"; The Mandalorian; December 18, 2019
- Created by: Jon Favreau
- Portrayed by: Werner Herzog

In-universe information
- Gender: Male
- Title: The Client
- Occupation: Imperial agent
- Affiliation: Galactic Empire; Moff Gideon

The Client is a fictional character in the Star Wars franchise who appears in three episodes of the first season of the Disney+ television series The Mandalorian. He is a mysterious, unnamed leader in the former Galactic Empire and subordinate of Moff Gideon, who plays a key role in setting the show's story into motion by hiring the bounty hunter known as "The Mandalorian" to retrieve a "50-year-old", yet infantile alien dubbed "The Child" (later named as Grogu).

The Client is portrayed by German film director, screenwriter, and actor Werner Herzog, who was recruited for the part by series creator and showrunner Jon Favreau. Herzog was not familiar with Favreau's previous work, nor had he ever seen a Star Wars film, but was impressed with the screenplays for The Mandalorian as well as the film-making style of the show.

Herzog particularly enjoyed filming scenes with the animatronic puppet of The Child, subsequently strongly urging Favreau to solely use the puppet for the character and not computer-generated imagery as had originally been intended for later scenes, calling them "cowards" for considering using CGI in its place. The character and Herzog's performance have received positive reviews from critics.

== Appearances ==
Almost no details are provided about the Client's backstory, except that he is loyal to the remnant of the former Galactic Empire, which by this time has fallen from power after losing its war against the Rebel Alliance. The character is never identified by name on the series and is known simply as "The Client".

=== Hiring The Mandalorian ===
He first appears in the series premiere episode "Chapter 1: The Mandalorian" of The Mandalorian, a Star Wars television series on the streaming service Disney+. The show's protagonist, a bounty hunter known as "The Mandalorian", is placed into contact with the Client by Greef Karga, the leader of the Bounty Hunters' Guild headquartered on the planet Nevarro. When the Mandalorian asks for work, Greef informs him that the Client is offering a mysterious, high-paying assignment, but will only meet with bounty hunters in person to discuss the matter. A number of Imperial stormtroopers are present for the Mandalorian's meeting with the Client, during which the Client informs the bounty hunter that the target is an unnamed individual who is 50 years old. Unbeknownst to the Mandalorian, this individual is a young alien creature known only as "The Child", a member of the same species as the Star Wars character Yoda. Werner Herzog, the actor who portrays the Client, said that in this way, his character "sets the story on its path" by recruiting the Mandalorian to seek the Child. The Client says he would prefer the Child be delivered to him alive, but that he is willing to pay a smaller amount for proof of termination. As a down payment, the Client gives the Mandalorian a small bar of beskar, the rare metal traditionally used to create the virtually invulnerable body armor of his people.

=== Acquiring and losing The Child ===
The Client returns in the episode "Chapter 3: The Sin", in which the Mandalorian brings him the captured Child. The Client provides the Mandalorian the promised beskar steel in a white security container he identifies as a "camtono". (This container is identical in appearance to an ice cream maker that an extra carried while fleeing Cloud City in the Star Wars film The Empire Strikes Back (1980). The item and its purpose had been the subject of much discussion by fans over the years, but the Client's use of the camtono was the first time it had been identified within the universe/franchise.) After collecting his payment, the Mandalorian asks what the Client plans to do with the Child, but the Client curtly reminds the Mandalorian that the Bounty Hunters' Guild forbids such questions. Later, the Mandalorian uses technology to eavesdrop on the Client, and hears the Client order his Imperial colleague, Dr. Pershing, to "extract the necessary material" from the Child; the exact material is not identified and his reasons for wanting it are not explained. Although Pershing notes they are supposed to return the Child to their employers alive, the Client insists he simply extracts the material quickly and "be done with it". The Mandalorian later returns to rescue the Child, killing all of the stormtroopers present and successfully fleeing the planet with the Child. The Client was not present during the Mandalorian's rescue.

=== Assassination ===
The Client makes his final appearance in the season's penultimate episode, "Chapter 7: The Reckoning". By this time, the Client had reinforced Nevarro with more stormtroopers, which had made it more difficult for the Bounty Hunters' Guild to operate there. As a result, Greef Karga arranges for the Mandalorian to return so they can kill the Client and his troops and eliminate the Imperial presence from the planet. The offer is a trap, and Greef plans to kill the Mandalorian and return the Child to the Client, but Greef has a change of heart after being healed by Grogu. They devise a new plan to assassinate the Client during a surreptitious meeting at a Nevarro cantina. The scheme initially goes according to plan, with the Client believing the Mandalorian and the alien Child have both been captured. Just as he asks to see the Child, the Client receives a hologram call from his superior, Moff Gideon, who rhetorically inquires about the Child; then presumably to punish his failure, orders a squad of six Death Troopers to open fire on the Client from outside the cantina, through its main window. The Client is seen shot through the chest and killed, as are all of his stormtrooper guards.

== Characterization ==
The Client is a mysterious figure, with little known about his history or motivations. He is an untrustworthy and devious individual, described by Werner Herzog as "a dark, dark sort of figure that shouldn't be trusted at all". He is an intimidating figure, as illustrated by the fact that Greef Karga, who is normally confident and commanding with others, acts cautiously and even fearfully in dealing with the Client. He has an esoteric and existential manner of speaking, much like that of the real-life Herzog himself. Variety writer Will Thorne has suggested the Client's dialogue may have been specifically tailored after Herzog's dark and eccentric personality, particularly citing lines like the one from "Chapter 7: The Reckoning" in which the Client says: "Look outside: is the world more peaceful since the revolution? I see nothing but death and chaos." The Client is a cold and severe individual, as illustrated by his apathy over whether the Child lives or dies. John Serba of Decider.com wrote that the Client was less like criminal characters featured in other Star Wars works like Jabba the Hutt, and more similar to Vito Corleone, the mobster protagonist of The Godfather (1972).

Herzog uses his own German accent for the part, providing what Serba called "instantly identifiable, idiosyncratic, intently articulate intonation". The Client is obsessed with obtaining the Child, and as time passes over the series gets increasingly anxious about capturing him. He truly believes in the mission and cause of the Galactic Empire, saying in "Chapter 7: The Reckoning" that "the Empire improves every system it touches." He believes the galaxy has become less peaceful and more chaotic since the fall of the Empire, and that the violence and oppression brought about by Imperial rule are justified by the order that the Empire provides. He claims that Imperial rule is the ideal form of government when judged by any metric, including "safety, prosperity, trade opportunity, (and) peace". The Client's costume includes a medal with the Imperial insignia worn around his neck, further signifying both his reverence for the Empire and his personal history with it.

== Portrayal ==
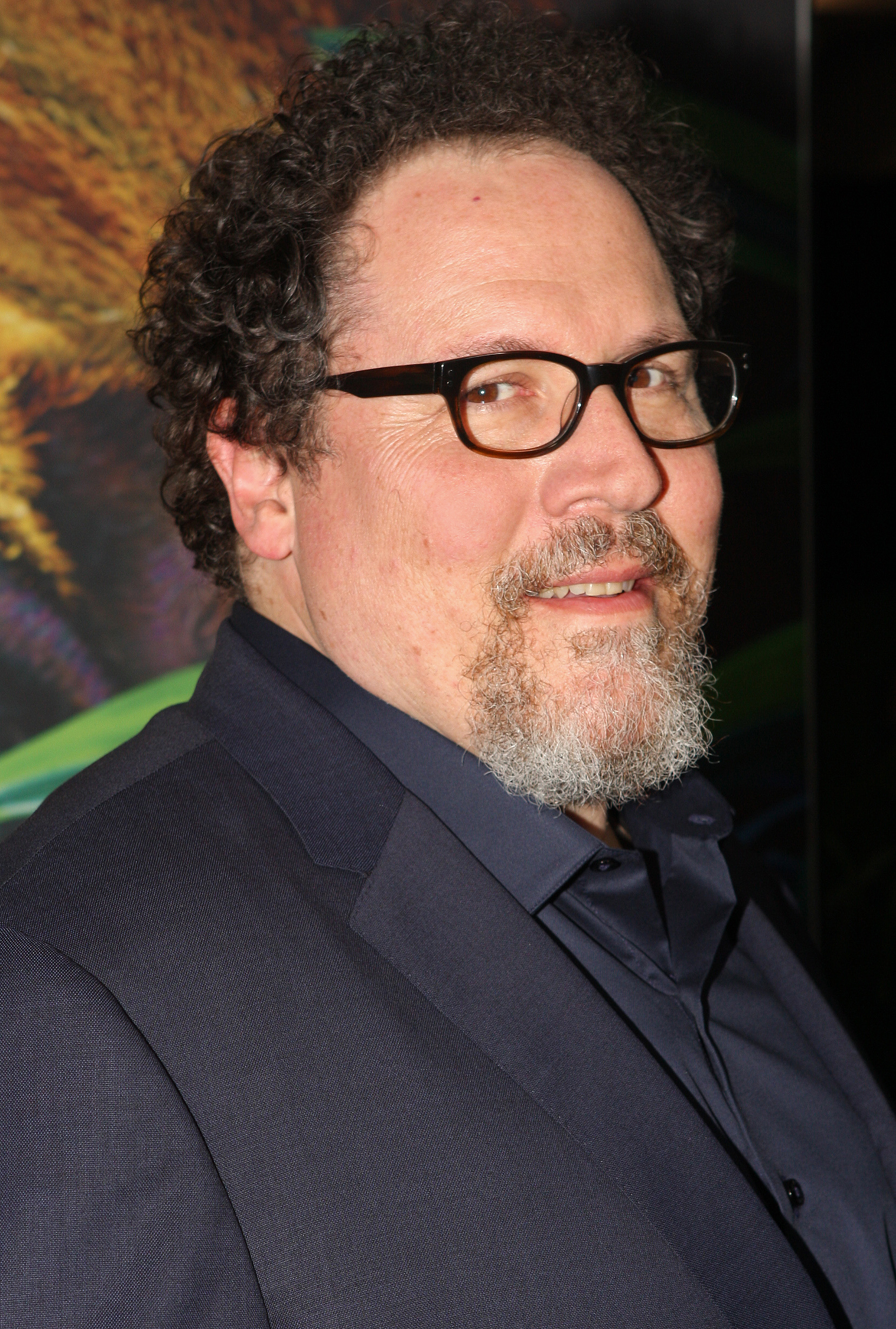
Werner Herzog was recruited for the part of The Client by The Mandalorian creator and showrunner Jon Favreau.

The Client is portrayed in The Mandalorian by German film director, screenwriter, and actor Werner Herzog. He was recruited for the part by series creator and showrunner Jon Favreau. Herzog believed Favreau approached him out of appreciation for his acting abilities, and also because Favreau saw a "kindred spirit" in him. Herzog said: "I think it's a bit of an homage to my films and to my storytelling and to my way of putting emphasis on world stories, fever dreams in the jungle, quasi-science fiction stories." Herzog also believed Favreau wanted him because "they needed somebody who would spread terror, and be frightening for the audience", which he felt he could do. It took Herzog less than one minute after meeting Favreau to be drawn to the project, later saying of the conversation: "I saw the universe. I saw costumes. I saw the round horizon. I saw the spacecraft. I saw an entire universe. And I knew this was really big." However, he requested full screenplays from The Mandalorian before formally accepting the role. After reading them, he felt the part "looked good and interesting".

Herzog accepted the role in part to help fund a film he was writing and directing called Family Romance, LLC (2019), which he financed himself after struggling to find traditional Hollywood financing. At the time he accepted the part on The Mandalorian, Herzog was not familiar with any other films Favreau had previously made, nor had he before seen any Star Wars films. He said of the franchise: "I've seen some trailers, I've seen some excerpts here and there. I know about the whole franchise and about the toys for the kids." Herzog was briefed about the franchise and its storyline by Favreau and members of the crew. He felt his lack of familiarity with Star Wars had no impact on his performance, saying "I knew what was expected of me. I knew the interior landscape of the character and I knew the exterior landscape." Herzog believed portraying the Client was similar to his performance as the antagonist in the action thriller film Jack Reacher (2012).

Rumors about Herzog's role on The Mandalorian first surfaced on the Internet in October 2018. His casting was formally announced on December 12, 2018. Footage of The Client was first publicly unveiled at the Star Wars Celebration convention in Chicago on April 14, 2019, during which the entirety of his first scene in the premiere episode was shown. The Client was also featured prominently in the first official trailer for The Mandalorian, released on August 23, 2019, where he was the only character with a speaking role. Much of Herzog's dialogue was also utilized as voice-over narration for a second Mandalorian trailer released on October 28, 2019.

== Filming ==
Herzog said he "enjoyed every single moment" of his experience filming The Mandalorian. He said that he has assumed previous Star Wars films were shot with a great deal of "motion-controlled cameras and green screens", but that The Mandalorian was a much more genuine and authentic filmmaking experience. He said of the process: "Filmmaking — and that's Jon's great achievement with The Mandalorian — is brought back to where it always has been". With its use of real-time rendering, virtual reality, and visual effects that displayed digitally-augmented environments during the filming process itself, Herzog said The Mandalorian allows the actors "see the entire universe in which they are operating". He said of the series: "It's cinema back at its best."

Deborah Chow, the director of both "Chapter 3: The Sin" and "Chapter 7: The Reckoning", said she normally tries to approach working with each actor the same way and not treat any differently from any other, but that "Werner is special". Herzog particularly enjoyed filming scenes with the animatronic puppet of Child character, which he called "heartbreakingly beautiful". Chow said directing the scene between Herzog and the Child was "one of the weirdest" moments of her career, because he had so much affection for the puppet and was interacting with it like it was a living being. She said: "I literally think that he had forgotten that it's not a real-live creature and he had fallen in love with it." Chow added: "You can't come up with a better matchup than Werner Herzog and Baby Yoda", a reference to the Child's popular nickname among fans and reviewers.

Herzog strongly urged the Mandalorian filmmakers to use the puppet for the character and not computer-generated imagery. Favreau and executive producer Dave Filoni shot scenes for the Child both with and without the puppet, so they could replace the character with a CGI effect in post-production if the puppet did not look satisfactory. After Herzog filmed a scene with the Child, Filoni began to remove the puppet to shoot another alternate scene without him, but Herzog urged him not to do so and to remain committed to the animatronics and puppetry, saying: "You are cowards. Leave it. Leave it." When this story was later told to the public, some media reports mistakenly described it as if the producers of The Mandalorian were entirely replacing the Child puppet with a CGI creation altogether until Herzog convinced them otherwise.

Carl Weathers, the actor who portrayed Greef Karga, said that although his character's personality was normally self-assured, he deliberately made him act more cautious and nervous in his scenes with Herzog to convey that the Client was a dangerous man. Weathers was a great admirer of Herzog, referring to him as "maestro" on the set of The Mandalorian, and the two had extensive conversations with each other about Herzog's past films and his relationship with actor Klaus Kinski.

== Reception ==
The Client character and Werner Herzog's performance have received generally positive reviews from critics. Nick Venable of CinemaBlend said the character "was a scene-stealer from the start" and that he wished he had been featured more prominently in the season. John Serba of Decider.com called Herzog a significant casting coup for The Mandalorian, and said the Client's "steely, dread-drenched, multi-layered, gravely philosophical dialogue" seemed specifically tailored for him. Serba praised the actor's performance, writing: "He delivers the heft with a deeply furrowed glower, and we feel it in our marrow." Scott Snowden of Space.com described Herzog as "magnificent" in delivering the Client's monologues. /Film writer Ethan Anderton said Herzog "makes the perfect crime boss" and has a "unique cadence and screen presence" which made him a good fit for The Mandalorian, which sought to explore a darker side of Star Wars. Likewise, Dazed writer Thom Waite said Herzog's "menacing presence" fits in well with the darker tone that The Mandalorian attempts to set for the Star Wars franchise.

Will Thorne of Variety praised Herzog's performance and described several lines of the character's dialogue as "gems". In an article headline "Werner Herzog's The Mandalorian Character Is The Next Great Star Wars Villain", Gretchen Smail of Bustle complimented Herzog's performance and called his casting "the best sign that you can expect the unexpected in The Mandalorian". Meghan Kirby of Entertainment Weekly wrote: "Everything about Herzog's character is unnerving and it's great." The Client ranked tenth on a Screen Rant list of the most interesting characters from the first season of The Mandalorian. The Nerdist Podcast created a three-minute YouTube video re-imagining The Mandalorian as if it were a documentary directed by Herzog, which included voice-over narration with a parody of Herzog's voice and persona.

== Merchandise ==
A Funko Pop figurine of the Client was announced on December 31, 2019. James Whitbrook of Gizmodo announced the release of the toy in a story with the headline "Forget the Baby Yoda, It's the Werner Herzog Funko Pop I Want", and wrote: "Nothing — nothing — can compare to the absurd brilliance of living in the reality where Funko Pop Werner Herzog is a Thing that Now Exists." Conversely, Vice writer Drew Schwartz wrote: "As strange as it is to see Werner Herzog transformed into a cute, plastic figurine with a giant head and a tiny body, it's even stranger to imagine who the hell would ever want to buy that figurine. But these people exist."
