= Chapter 7: The Reckoning =

- The Mandalorian episode
- Promotional poster
- Episode no.: Season 1 Episode 7
- Directed by: Deborah Chow
- Written by: Jon Favreau
- Cinematography by: Greig Fraser; Barry "Baz" Idoine
- Editing by: Andrew S. Eisen
- Original release date: December 18, 2019
- Running time: 37 minutes

Co-starring
- Carl Weathers as Greef Karga; Gina Carano as Cara Dune; Nick Nolte as the voice of Kuiil; Taika Waititi as the voice of IG-11; Werner Herzog as the Client; Giancarlo Esposito as Moff Gideon

Episode chronology
← Previous "Chapter 6: The Prisoner"	Next → "Chapter 8: Redemption"
- The Mandalorian season 1

"Chapter 7: The Reckoning" is the seventh episode of the first season of the American streaming television series The Mandalorian. It was written by the series' showrunner Jon Favreau and directed by Deborah Chow. The episode takes place in the Star Wars universe five years after the events of Return of the Jedi (1983). In the episode, the guild leader Greef Karga offers the Mandalorian to kill the Client in exchange for his and the Child's freedom. Believing to be a trap but having no choice, the Mandalorian recruits Cara Dune and Kuiil to assist him, with the latter bringing a reprogrammed IG-11 unit. Arriving at Nevarro, they are soon surrounded by the imperial troops where the team will be forced to confront their leader Moff Gideon.

It stars Pedro Pascal as the Mandalorian, while the Child is created through animatronics and puppetry augmented with visual effects. The episode also features co-stars Gina Carano, Carl Weathers, Nick Nolte, Taika Waititi, Werner Herzog, and Giancarlo Esposito. Favreau was hired to be the showrunner of the series in March 2018, while Chow joined the series to direct two episodes for the season in October. Favreau also serves as the executive producer of the series alongside Dave Filoni, Kathleen Kennedy and Colin Wilson.

"Chapter 7: The Reckoning" was released on the streaming service Disney+ on December 18, 2019. It was released early so it could include a sneak preview of Star Wars: The Rise of Skywalker, which was released on December 20. The episode received critical acclaim, with praise for its action sequences, performances, Chow's direction, score, emotional weight, unification of prior storylines, and cinematography, which won a Primetime Emmy Award.

== Plot ==
The Mandalorian receives a message from Greef Karga. Karga's town has been overrun by Imperial troops led by the Client, who is desperate to recover "the Child". Karga proposes that the Mandalorian use the Child as bait to kill the Client and free the town in return for allowing the Mandalorian and the Child to live in peace; Karga secretly plans to kill the Mandalorian and take the Child to the Client. Sensing this trap, the Mandalorian recruits Cara Dune and Kuiil the Ugnaught to assist him. Despite the Mandalorian's apprehension, Kuiil brings a rebuilt IG-11, reprogrammed to act as a nurse droid instead of a bounty hunter and also three blurrg. Upon arrival on Nevarro they meet Karga and his associates, but en route to the town is attacked by large flying reptile creatures. Karga is injured but the Child uses the Force to heal his wound; in return, Karga shoots his associates, unable to go through with his trap.

The group formulates a new plan: Karga will pretend that Dune captured the Mandalorian, and all three will enter the town to meet the Client while Kuiil returns the Child to the ship, where IG-11 is waiting. During the meeting, the Client receives a call from Moff Gideon, whose stormtroopers and deathtroopers surround the building and open fire, killing the Client. Gideon arrives and boasts that the Child will soon be in his possession. In the desert outside town, two scout troopers track and capture the Child, and leave Kuiil dead on the ground.

== Production ==
=== Development ===
Lucasfilm and Disney announced the development of a new live action Star Wars series that would be released for their streaming service Disney+ in November 2017. The series would be focused in the Mandalorians exploring the "scum and villainy" of the Star Wars universe taking place five years the events of the film Return of the Jedi (1983). The series would later reveal its official title The Mandalorian alongside the official premise. Lucasfilm president Kathleen Kennedy saw the opportunity of the series to allow a diverse group of writers and directors to create their own Star Wars stories. In March 2018, Jon Favreau was hired by Lucasfilm to be the head writer of the series, while Deborah Chow was announced to direct two episodes for the series by October. The executive producers of the series include Kennedy, Favreau, Dave Filoni and Colin Wilson. The first season's seventh episode titled "Chapter 7: The Reckoning", was written by Favreau, and was released on Disney+ on December 18, 2019.

=== Writing ===
The series also deals with the concept of good, evil and nature, which is very notable in the episode. Favreau created bounty droid IG-11 to be introduced in the first episode as a ruthless and murderous droid, but for the episode he is reprogrammed by Kuiil as a protector and nurse. Favreau had the intention of showing that IG-11 is not good or bad, but that he was only programed in that way and it is part of the nature. Favreau also explored deeper the Mandalorian hatred against droids as he believes that they are violent by nature and unable to change, even after IG-11 is reprogrammed to take care of other people instead of killing. Giancarlo Esposito believes that his character Moff Gideon cannot be described as a "good" or "bad" character, but instead as a man attempting to restore the order in the aftermath. Esposito stated: "Is he good? Is he bad? We don't know. We do know that the world needs someone to put it back together."

Favreau also use the relationship of Pat and Billy from the film Pat Garrett and Billy the Kid, to develop the relationship between the Mandalorian and Greef Karga, as the two initially are considered allies but soon they become enemies after one of them changes side, only to become allies once again. The episode ending where several stroopers surrounds the main characters after a shootout and apparently had now way no escape, is very reminiscent to the film High Noon (1952), where the Marshal Will Kane is surrounded by several members of the gang while trying to protect the own on his own.

=== Casting ===
Nick Nolte was cast as the voice of Kuiil in November 2018. Giancarlo Esposito, Carl Weathers, and Werner Herzog joined the main cast in December 2018 as Moff Gideon, Greef Karga, and the Client, respectively. Gina Carano and Taika Waititi also co-star as Cara Dune and the voice of IG-11. Additional guest starring actors cast for this episode include Adam Pally as a bike scout trooper and Dave Reaves as a Zabrak fighter. Brendan Wayne and Lateef Crowder are credited as stunt doubles for the Mandalorian.

Misty Rosas, Rio Hackford, and Chris Bartlett are credited as performance artists for Kuiil, IG-11, and the RA-7 droid, respectively. Gene Freeman and John Dixon are credited as stunt doubles for Greef Karga and the Client. "The Child" was performed by various puppeteers. The episode features several stormtroopers in a single scene. When the production team realized they did not have enough suits for the troopers, they contacted the 501st Legion, a fan group dedicated to cosplay of stormtroopers, Imperial officers, and other Star Wars villains, to fill in the extra roles.

=== Music ===
A soundtrack album for the episode was released by digitally by Walt Disney Records on December 18, 2019, featuring Ludwig Göransson's score. On August 24, 2020, it was announced that Mondo would be releasing a limited edition for the complete score of the first season on vinyl edition, consisting of 8-CD discs for each episode with each one set pressed with a 180 Gram vinyl disc housed in it own jacked that features artwork by Paul Mann, while the box set is adorned with Mando's mudhorn Signet. The pre-orders for the soundtrack started on June 26, and finally released on December 15.

The Mandalorian: Chapter 7 (Original Score)
No.	Title	Length
1.	"Man of Honour"	2:19
2.	"Reprogram"	2:32
3.	"Kuiil"	1:22
4.	"The Standoff"	2:57
5.	"Black Skies"	4:37
6.	"This Is It"	1:57
7.	"The Arrival"	3:16
8.	"The Mandalorian (Orchestral Version)"	2:20
Total length:		21:20

== Reception ==
=== Critical response ===
"Chapter 7: The Reckoning" received critical acclaim. On Rotten Tomatoes, the episode holds an approval rating of 100% with an average rating of 8.5/10, based on 29 reviews. The website's critics consensus reads, "The Mandalorian's disparate plot threads coalesce in thrilling fashion during "The Reckoning", with familiar faces making a welcome return and the emotional stakes going into hyperdrive."

In a positive review, Tyler Hersko, of IndieWire, felt the episode was "a superb slice of westernized sci-fi and a much-needed breath of fresh air that will leave viewers rabid to discover what happens next week in the season finale." Alan Sepinwall of Rolling Stone felt that "the episode is as thrilling and entertaining as it is because the season unfolded so simply and carefully." While reviewing for CNET, Sean Keane praised Chow's direction and the return of the characters from previous episodes, calling the episode a "pretty darn epic''. Erik Kain from Forbes, considered that the episode ended in a tragedy though not before bringing an action-packed sequence that brings the characters that appeared in previous episodes of the series. Kain also praised that the episode return to its main storyline, after its departure from the three previous episodes. Matt Webb Mitovich gave a positive review from the episode for TVLine, considering that the episode is the best episode yet of the season that offers an "action-packed lead-up to its season finale, with returning faces" and a worthy cliffhanger that serves as a set-up to the season's finale.

For a review for the Polygon, Charlie Hall stated that the episode "feels like Star Wars" even though it tells a story of its own from a perspective that was never shown. Hall also commented that he expected the eight episode to have a happy ending. Bryan Young from /Film considered that Chow managed to take risks for the filming of the episode, creating great moments for the characters, the action sequences, and the cliffhanger that serve as the setup for the season's finale. The Ringer's reviewer Ben Lindbergh, praised the episode for refocusing on the main story, after three episodes of only being focused on the Mandalorian's and the Child individual adventures and commented "The Mandalorian is refocusing on the characters we care about." Laura Prudom who reviewed the episode for IGN commented that the show finally returns "to the plot threads left dangling since episode 3, when Mando blasted his way out of Nevarro with the Child in tow, burning bridges with the Bounty Hunters' Guild and putting himself in the crosshairs of the Client." Prudom's positive response to the episode prompted her to rate it an 8.5 out of 10, calling it satisfying surprising.

=== Accolades ===
Award	Date of ceremony	Category	Recipient(s)	Result	Ref(s)
Primetime Creative Arts Emmy Awards	September 14–17 & 19, 2020	Outstanding Cinematography for a Single-Camera Series (Half-Hour)	Greig Fraser and Baz Idoine	Won	
