= IG-11 =

Star Wars character

- Star Wars character
- First appearance: "Chapter 1: The Mandalorian"; The Mandalorian; (2019)
- Created by: Jon Favreau
- Based on: IG-88 by George Lucas
- Portrayed by: Rio Hackford
- Voiced by: Taika Waititi

In-universe information
- Species: Droid
- Occupation: Bounty hunter; later reprogrammed as nurse droid and city marshal of Nevarro

IG-11 is a fictional character in the Star Wars franchise who appears in the Disney+ television series The Mandalorian. An extremely deadly and efficient bounty hunter droid, IG-11 initially attempts to capture and kill an alien known as the Child but is stopped and destroyed by another bounty hunter known as the Mandalorian. IG-11 is later repaired by the Ugnaught alien Kuiil and reprogrammed as a nurse and protector of the Child and an ally of the Mandalorian. Following IG-11's destruction, its remains are rebuilt as IG-12, a pilotable exoskeleton to be controlled by the Child, then after further destruction, is rebuilt again, this time with a recycled memory circuit, to serve as city marshal of Nevarro.

The voice of IG-11 is performed by Taika Waititi, who was offered the part by The Mandalorian creator Jon Favreau based on their mutual work in the films of the Marvel Cinematic Universe (MCU). Waititi said he tried to create a voice that lacked human emotion while still maintaining some semblance of humanity and described his performance as a cross between Siri and HAL 9000. IG-11 is based on and closely resembles another Star Wars bounty hunter of the same IG model named IG-88 created by George Lucas, so much so that fans and journalists initially mistook IG-11 for the other droid when the character was first unveiled.

Although capable of great destruction, IG-11 also occasionally provides comedic moments in The Mandalorian, and Waititi felt the character had a childlike innocence and naivety. His transformation from bounty hunter to protector drew discussions about nature versus nurture and the sentience of droids in the Star Wars universe. IG-11 has been received positively by reviewers and has been described as a fan favorite, with some calling him one of the best droids in the franchise. Waititi was nominated for a Primetime Emmy Award for Outstanding Character Voice-Over Performance, making it his first Emmy nomination and the first nominee of the category for a live-action series.

== Appearances ==
IG-11 during his first appearance in the debut episode of The Mandalorian

=== In Star Wars medias ===
IG-11 was in three episodes in the first season of The Mandalorian, making his first appearance in the series premiere episode "Chapter 1: The Mandalorian", which first aired on November 12, 2019. He is an IG-series assassin droid, a dangerous model that has largely been outlawed. In his first appearance, IG-11 is a member of the Bounty Hunters' Guild, and attempts to capture an unidentified living being, which is also being sought by a fellow bounty hunter known as the Mandalorian, the show's protagonist. The Mandalorian has a distrust for all droids that stems from the fact that battle droids attacked his home planet and killed his parents during the Clone Wars when he was a child. This creates tension between himself and IG-11. Both the Mandalorian and IG-11 track the being to a compound on the planet Arvala-7, guarded by a large number of mercenaries of the Nikto alien species. While the Mandalorian is scouting the compound from afar, IG-11 simply walks up and demands they hand it over, resulting in a large gunfight, which The Mandalorian eventually joins. The two agree to team up and split the reward. They eventually eliminate the mercenaries and shoot their way into the compound, where they discover the asset, an alien of the same species as Yoda known as "the Child". IG-11 attempts to kill him, but the Mandalorian shoots IG-11 in the head and destroys him to protect the Child.

IG-11 returns in the season's penultimate episode "Chapter 7: The Reckoning", in which the Ugnaught alien Kuiil, an ally of the Mandalorian living on Arvala-7, repairs IG-11 and reprograms him to be a nurse droid. After Kuiil teaches IG-11 how to walk again, the droid takes on a more docile personality than before, serving meals and tea to guests and helps Kuiil feed his domesticated blurrg creatures. Kuiil set the droid's base function as "to nurse and protect". When the Mandalorian and his ally Cara Dune visit Kuiil seeking help with a mission on the planet Nevarro, they are surprised to find IG-11 alive and initially draw their weapons on him, until Kuiil assures them he will not harm them. Kuiil and IG-11 accompany the Mandalorian and Cara to Nevarro to help protect the Child during the mission. IG-11's new programming means he no longer wants to kill the Child and is instead committed to protecting it, though the Mandalorian still does not trust the droid.

IG-11 next appeared in the first-season finale, "Chapter 8: Redemption". At the start of the episode, after Imperial Scout Troopers have killed Kuiil and kidnapped the Child, IG-11 catches up with the troopers outside of a nearby town, incapacitates them, and reclaims the child. The droid then steals one of their speeder bikes and rides into the town, where he finds he Mandalorian, Cara, and the bounty hunter Greef Karga surrounded by stormtroopers being led by a man named Moff Gideon. IG-11 comes to their assistance, killing multiple stormtroopers while protecting the Child and helping the party retreat to a bunker. The Mandalorian is seriously injured and, still distrusting of droids, he assumes IG-11 is going to kill him, but instead the droid heals him with the use of bacta. IG-11 removes his helmet to treat serious injuries he sustained, marking the first time in the series the Mandalorian's face is shown; he initially objects because his culture requires that no living thing see him without his helmet, to which IG-11 responds, "I am not a living thing." The exchange ultimately wins IG-11 the trust of the Mandalorian.

Later, after IG-11 helps the party escape from the bunker into the sewer system, they come across a Mandalorian armorer in the tunnels, who provides them an escape route aboard a droid-controlled floating barge on a river of lava. As the barge approaches the tunnel exit, the Mandalorian's scans reveal that a large number of Moff Gideon's stormtroopers are hiding at the tunnel gate in an ambush. IG-11 concludes there was no scenario in which the Child could be saved and IG-11 would survive, so he decided to sacrifice himself. He asked the Mandalorian for assurance that the Child would be safe in his care, which would allow him to default to his secondary command so he could self-destruct. The Mandalorian refuses at first, insisting they still need IG-11, but eventually he reluctantly agreed. He is saddened at the loss of IG-11, to which the droid responds: "There's nothing to be sad about. I've never been alive." IG-11 then walks through the river of lava, which causes him to start to melt down, but before doing so he reaches the stormtrooper squadron and detonates himself in the middle of them, killing them all in an explosion and ensuring safe passage for the others.

The Mandalorian and Greef Karga attempt to revive IG-11's remains in "Chapter 17: The Apostate", the former seeking a droid he trusts to explore Mandalore. They are successful, however he reverts to his previous programming, attempting to assassinate the Child (now known as Grogu), and forcing Karga to destroy him. The Mandalorian learns from Anzellans that he would need a new memory core to fully repair him, a quest he ultimately abandons in "Chapter 18: The Mines of Mandalore" in favor of using R5-D4 to explore Mandalore. By the events of "Chapter 23: The Spies", IG-11's remains are used by the Anzellans to build IG-12, a pilotable exoskeleton to be controlled by Grogu. In "Chapter 24: The Return", Grogu operates IG-12 which he uses to rescue Djarin and square off against the three guards that Gideon requested from his fellow warlords. IG-12 was cut down by them. Following the demise of Gideon, Grogu sees a head similar to IG-11 as part of the trophies in a bar that Carson Teva frequents. With help from Teva, Djarin was able to arrange IG-11 to be repaired with the right droid parts as he becomes Nevarro's new marshal.

== Characterization ==
IG-11 has a thin body made of an armored substrate, making it durable and able to withstand repeated assaults. He is an excellent and efficient fighter and an extremely accurate shot, capable of eliminating many enemies even when outnumbered. Taika Waititi, the actor who performs his voice, compared IG-11 to the Terminator, the murderous android character from the media franchise of the same name. IG-11 is also very fast, as illustrated by his ability to quickly catch up on foot to the two Imperial Scout Troopers who abduct the Child, even though they were riding on speeder bikes. When first introduced in The Mandalorian, IG-11 is a ruthless killer, willing to annihilate his victims, and is single-minded in his purpose to collect upon his bounties. Once reprogrammed by Kuiil, IG-11 is still capable of great destruction, but his instincts now are for servitude and protection of the child instead of killing. He remains direct, stoic, and by-the-book, but his personality becomes obedient and deferential, with IG-11 serving the characters meals and tea like a maid. However, he shows the same level of determination he had as a bounty hunter when he is learning, or relearning, everything following his reprogramming. IG-11 does not understand sarcasm or know how to lie. Waititi described him as having a childlike innocence and naivety, saying: "It's like a child with a gun." IG-11 is often a comedic character, with his straightforward personality and monotonic line delivery providing what Kofi Outlaw of Comicbook.com called "unique off-beat droid humor". Waititi believed IG-11 became "a very lovable character" as the season progressed. Armaan Babu of Media Entertainment Arts WorldWide suggested there is a particular bond between IG-11 and Kuiil because they share similar histories: "Both IG-11 and Kuiil have violent pasts that they were sold and forced into against their will, who are now learning to live life on their own terms."

== Conception ==
IG-11 closely resembles the IG-88 (pictured), a bounty hunter droid featured in The Empire Strikes Back (1980), so much so that fans and journalists mistook the new character for IG-88 when he was first announced.

IG-11 closely resembles a bounty hunter droid character of a similar model in the Star Wars franchise named IG-88, who made a brief appearance during one scene in The Empire Strikes Back (1980) as one of several bounty hunters with whom Darth Vader meets. IG-88 stands in one place during the scene and does not move, so IG-11 marked the first time this type of droid was seen moving and in action in a live-action production. The Mandalorian executive producer Dave Filoni said of IG-88: "People forget in Empire, you never even see him walk or take a step – the prop was actually bolted to the floor. So just giving (IG-11) feet was something new and original." The Mandalorian creator Jon Favreau first revealed IG-11 on Christmas of 2018, via a photo on the social media network Instagram of the character standing in front of a green screen, without identifying him by name. The character was then featured prominently in posters, commercials, and other promotional materials in advance of the release of The Mandalorian.

IG-11 immediately became a highly anticipated character among fans familiar with IG-88, and many fans and journalists mistook the character for the actual IG-88 due to their resemblance despite IG-88 seen deactivated on Bespin in The Empire Strikes Back. In an Entertainment Weekly article that ran on April 14, 2019, Favreau clarified that the character was not IG-88, but rather an entirely new character named IG-11. Filoni said rather than simply reusing IG-88, he preferred establishing a new character without any defined backstory and contributing something new to the Star Wars universe. Filoni noted that IG-88 already had a well-established character history in the Star Wars expanded universe, which extends to novels, comic books, video games, and other mediums, even though most of his stories were no longer considered official canon following Disney's purchase of the franchise. Filoni also cited the success of Ahsoka Tano, a new character introduced in the television series Star Wars: The Clone Wars and later featured in the show Star Wars Rebels, as further validating for introducing a new character in IG-11 rather than re-using an old one.

== Portrayal ==
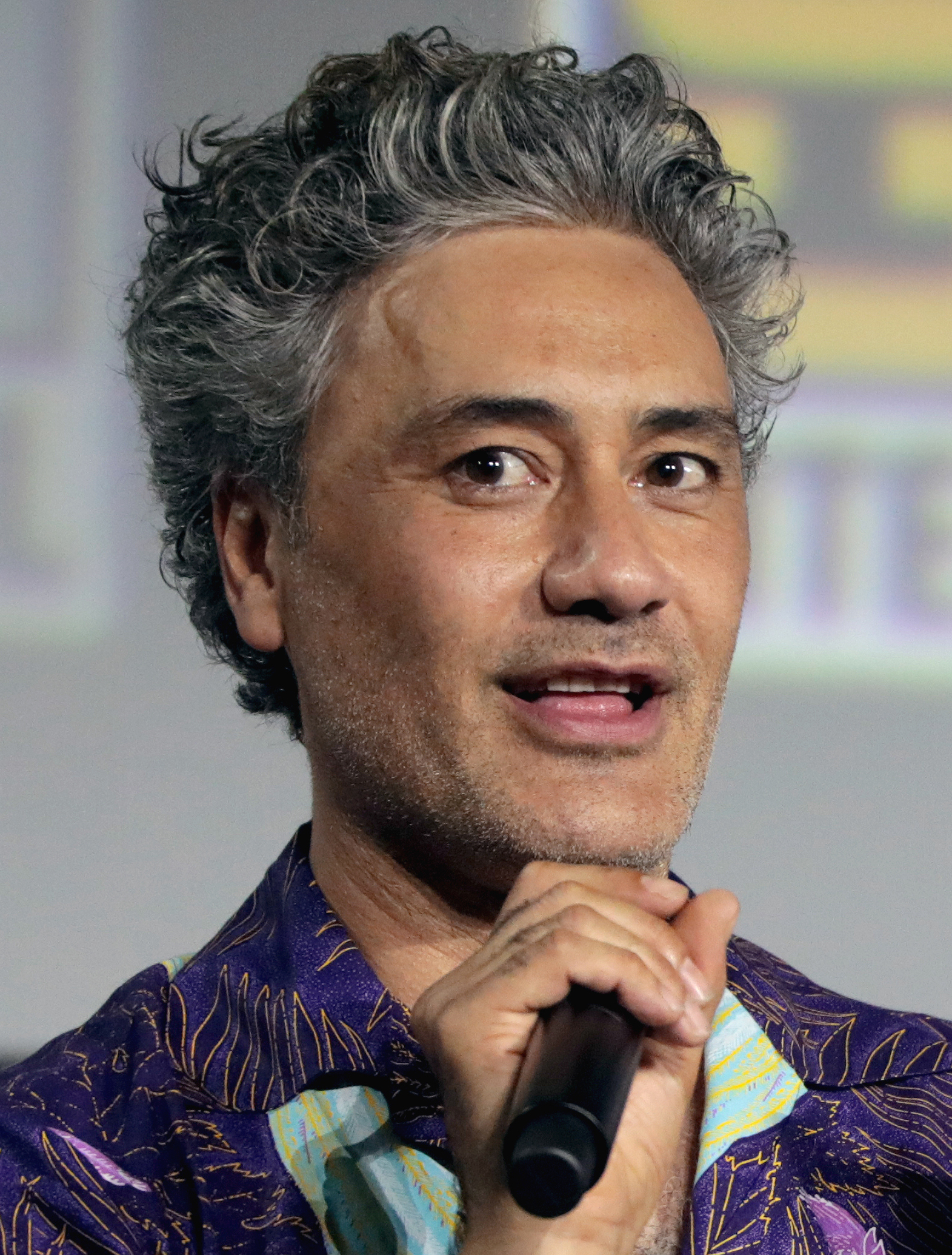
Taika Waititi (pictured) provided the voice of IG-11, and also directed the season finale episode featuring the character.

IG-11 was voiced by actor and director Taika Waititi. Favreau offered him the part, having become familiar with Waititi through their mutual work on films in the Marvel Cinematic Universe; Favreau directed Iron Man (2008) and Iron Man 2 (2010), executive-produced Iron Man 3 and all four Avengers films, and portrayed Happy Hogan in several Marvel films, while Waititi directed Thor: Ragnarok (2017) and played Korg in two Marvel films. Favreau was impressed by Waititi's creativity and energy, describing him as "a powerhouse right now, creatively". He was also impressed by Waititi's comedic background and abilities, as well as his passion for the Star Wars franchise: "He brings his style of humor to it, but he was also a fan. To me, that was the bottom line." The casting was first announced by Favreau on March 21, 2019, when he posted a photo on Instagram of Waititi recording dialogue for the character. Waititi also directed the first-season finale, which included IG-11's final appearance in the series.

Waititi said it was a challenge to come up with the voice for IG-11 because it had to lack human emotion and personality while still maintaining some semblance of humanity, which he described as a subtle and tricky balance. He described the voice somewhere between those of Siri, the virtual assistant of Apple Inc. products, and HAL 9000, the artificial intelligence character from 2001: A Space Odyssey (1968). Waititi said he felt IG-11 had an "amazing arc", changing and evolving as the series progressed.

== Themes ==
Kuiil's reprogramming of IG-11 raises nature versus nurture themes in The Mandalorian. Even after IG-11 is reprogrammed, the Mandalorian does not believe he has truly changed, because he believes droids have an essential nature and that IG-11's nature remains murderous and untrustworthy. But in reprogramming IG-11, Kuiil nurtures him and helps him to change; Kuiil feels that in the process of learning how to function again, IG-11 gained a new personality. Kuiil insists to the Mandalorian: "Droids are not good or bad — they are neutral reflections of those who program them." Keith Phipps of Vulture wrote of IG-11 and the nature versus nurture theme: "He's not bad. He's just programmed that way, and with care and change he can do a lot of good in the world."

The dynamic between Kuiil and IG-11 reflects a childrearing theme that is prevalent among multiple characters throughout the first season of The Mandalorian. The two have a relationship similar to that of a father and son, as demonstrated in the scene in which Kuiil teaches IG-11 how to operate and function after the droid is reprogrammed. This dynamic is similar to the one shared by the Mandalorian and the child throughout the season. The Kuiil and IG-11 scenes also demonstrate that how the "child" character is raised makes a significant difference in whether the child becomes an asset or a threat to those around him. The droid was a dangerous assassin before Kuiil reprogrammed him, but thanks to the Ugnaught's parenting, he becomes a protector and helper instead. This, too, is similar to the relationship between the Mandalorian and the Child. For example, the scene in which the Child uses the Force to choke Cara Dune shows that the Child has the potential for evil if he is not properly guided by his "parent".

Additionally, Phipps questions whether IG-11's destructive behavior around the Child could ultimately be bad for his development, even though the violence is intended to protect him. Since the Child may be learning by observing, Phipps suggests his Force power could become very dangerous if he uses it for violence like IG-11 does: "That look of wonder in the Child's eyes as IG-11 kills and kills again is hilarious, but also a little chilling." IG-11 also raises questions about the sentience of droids in the Star Wars universe. IG-11, like many droids in the franchise, appears to have a distinct personality and be almost fully sentient, but still accepts full servitude to their biological masters and allies. Babu wrote: "Are the droids in the Star Wars universe all slaves, or is their free will merely an illusion borne of their programming, rendering the slavery question moot but bringing up a lot more? IG-11 seems like just the droid to explore that concept further."

== Reception ==
IG-11 has been received positively by reviewers and fans alike. Following the release of the season finale, a large number of fans took to social media outlets like Twitter to discuss and voice their appreciation for the character, with some calling him the best droid in the Star Wars franchise. Gina Carbone of CinemaBlend called IG-11 a "fan favorite", particularly praising his "amazing" final scene in the finale. Charles Ridgely of Comicbook.com called IG-11 "one of the most beloved characters in recent Star Wars history", as well as "the real MVP" of the season finale and possibly the entire series. He wrote: "If you've never been emotional about a droid before, IG-11 will certainly make it happen." Some fans on Twitter said IG-11's sacrifice was more powerful than a scene in Star Wars: The Rise of Skywalker in which C-3PO similarly puts himself in danger to help his friends. Umberto Gonzalez of TheWrap described the character as a scene stealer.

Screen Rant placed IG-11 sixth on the list of the most interesting characters from the first season of The Mandalorian, and fourth on a separate list of the best characters introduced by the show. He also ranked sixth on a CinemaBlend list of the most iconic droids of the Star Wars franchise. Screen Rant writer Kevin Pantoja called IG-11 "awesome from the moment we meet it", and said Taika Waititi's vocal performance is a large part of the character's appeal. Keith Phipps of Vulture said of IG-11 in the series finale: "The title may still read The Mandalorian, but this episode really belongs to IG-11." Armaan Babu called IG-11 "one of the most interesting droids in the 'Star Wars' universe", describing his transformation from bounty hunter to protector a "surprisingly effective tale". Babu felt the story of IG-11 and Kuiil was strong enough that they warranted their spin-off series. Likewise, Variety writer Will Thorne called IG-11's reprogramming and evolution surprising and unexpectedly moving: "Who knew we needed an emotional droid rehabilitation segment?"

Taika Waititi has said of the character: "He really held up the entire season, didn't he? From episode one all the way through, he was the hero." In a January 2020 interview with TheWrap, Waititi said he believed fans should start a petition to bring IG-11 back for the second season of The Mandalorian, though some journalists believed the suggestion was facetious.

== Merchandise ==
A Funko Pop figurine of IG-11 was announced on December 31, 2019. An action figure of the character was released by Hot Toys, and Hasbro released a six-inch action figure of the character as part of the company's Star Wars: The Black Series toy line.
