= Chapter 8: Redemption =

- The Mandalorian episode
- Promotional poster
- Episode no.: Season 1 Episode 8
- Directed by: Taika Waititi
- Written by: Jon Favreau
- Cinematography by: Barry "Baz" Idoine
- Editing by: Jeff Seibenick
- Original release date: December 27, 2019
- Running time: 45 minutes

Co-starring
- Taika Waititi as the voice of IG-11; Giancarlo Esposito as Moff Gideon; Gina Carano as Cara Dune; Carl Weathers as Greef Karga; Emily Swallow as the Armorer

Episode chronology
← Previous "Chapter 7: The Reckoning"	Next → "Chapter 9: The Marshal"
- The Mandalorian season 1

"Chapter 8: Redemption" is the eighth and final episode of the first season of the American streaming television series The Mandalorian. It was written by the series' showrunner Jon Favreau and directed by Taika Waititi. The episode takes place in the Star Wars universe five years after the events of Return of the Jedi (1983). In the episode, The Mandalorian, Greef Karga, Cara Dune, and IG-11 are forced to make their way out, fighting the imperial troopers and their leader Moff Gideon, in order to ensure the Child's safety once and for all. The Mandalorian, whose real name is revealed to be Din Djarin, is instructed by his leader, the Armorer, to deliver the Child to the Jedi.

It stars Pedro Pascal as the Mandalorian, while the Child is created through animatronics and puppetry augmented with visual effects. The episode also features co-stars Taika Waititi, Gina Carano, Carl Weathers, Emily Swallow, and Giancarlo Esposito. Favreau was hired to be the showrunner of the series in March 2018, while Waititi joined the series to direct an episode for the season in October. Favreau also serves as the executive producer of the series alongside Dave Filoni, Kathleen Kennedy and Colin Wilson.

"Chapter 8: Redemption" was released on the streaming service Disney+ on December 27, 2019. The episode received critical acclaim, with praise towards its action sequences, emotional weight, performances, musical score, and Waititi's direction. It received several accolades, including four Primetime Emmy Awards nominations, winning one of them.

== Plot ==
While the Mandalorian, Cara Dune, and Greef Karga are trapped, IG-11 rescues "the Child" from two bickering scout troopers, and informs the group of Kuiil's death. The Mandalorian finds a vent into the sewers, where he hopes to find his people's hidden stronghold. Moff Gideon gives them until nightfall to surrender, or he will order his troops to fire, before saying Din Djarin, the Mandalorian's real name. The Mandalorian recognizes Gideon, who had been an officer of the Empire's secret police when the Empire took over Mandalore. IG-11 arrives on a Scout Trooper's bike with the Child, blasting through the stormtroopers. The Mandalorian takes down several more, but is badly wounded by Gideon. As the group take cover inside, Gideon orders a Flametrooper to incinerate them, but the Child uses the Force to reflect the flames and kill the trooper. The Mandalorian and IG-11 remain behind while Dune and Karga take the Child into the sewers. Pointing out that a Mandalorian's face being seen is technically not a violation of the Mandalorian creed, as he is a droid and not a living thing, IG-11 removes the Mandalorian's helmet, revealing the latter's face for the first time. After treating his injuries they then rejoin the others in the sewers.

Arriving at the Mandalorian enclave, they find it abandoned except for the Armorer, who explains that the Imperials found the enclave when the Mandalorians revealed themselves. Upon seeing the Child, the Armorer is reminded of the Jedi, whom Mandalorians see as their ancient enemies. She instructs the Mandalorian to take the Child to the Jedi, wherever they might be; she also carves a Mudhorn signet into his pauldron and gives him a jetpack. While the Armorer remains behind, the Mandalorian, Dune, Karga, IG-11, and the Child escape down an underground lava river. IG-11 decides to sacrifice himself by walking into an ambush and activating his self-destruct. After they emerge from the tunnel, Gideon attacks in the TIE fighter in which he arrived. Using his jetpack, the Mandalorian plants explosives on Gideon's fighter, which brings down the craft. With the Imperials seemingly dealt with, Karga invites the Mandalorian to return to the Guild, but he refuses as he must take care of the Child. Dune elects to remain behind to work as Karga's enforcer. The Mandalorian buries Kuiil's body beneath a cairn of stones and departs Nevarro. Meanwhile, Gideon cuts himself out of the crashed fighter with the Darksaber. (Note: Actor Giancarlo Esposito, as well as Lucasfilm's official Star Wars website, has identified the weapon as the Darksaber, a Mandalorian lightsaber that has appeared previously in Star Wars animated series.)

== Production ==
=== Development ===
Lucasfilm and Disney announced the development of a new live action Star Wars series that would be released for their streaming service Disney+ in November 2017. The series would be focused in the Mandalorians exploring the "scum and villainy" of the Star Wars universe taking place five years the events of the film Return of the Jedi (1983). The series would later reveal its official title The Mandalorian alongside the official premise. Lucasfilm president Kathleen Kennedy saw the opportunity of the series to allow a diverse group of writers and directors to create their own Star Wars stories. In March 2018, Jon Favreau was hired by Lucasfilm to be the head writer of the series, while Taika Waititi was announced to direct an episode for the series by October. The executive producers of the series include Kennedy, Favreau, Dave Filoni and Colin Wilson. The first season's eight episode titled "Chapter 8: Redemption", was written by Favreau, and was released on Disney+ on December 27, 2019.

=== Writing ===
The episode's storyline focuses on the relationship between the Mandalorian and the Child which is heavily inspired to the comic book manga Lone Wolf and Cub, which follows a similar storyline where the protagonist Ogami Ittō is forced to travel with his child on a dangerous journey with his baby child Daigorō. Favreau developed the story to follow the Mandalorian's struggle to taking care of the Child, until this episode where he finally accepts the role of fatherhood, after the Armorer tasks him to take care of the child as part of his creed or take him to the Jedis. The final scene for the episode, reveals that Moff Gideon has the darksaber, as Favreau intends to create a rivalry between Gideon and the Mandalorian. The episode marks as the live-action debut of the darksaber, after being previously introduced only in the animated series Star Wars: The Clone Wars and Star Wars Rebels.

=== Casting ===
The co-starring actors cast for this episode are Taika Waititi as the voice of IG-11, Giancarlo Esposito as Moff Gideon, Gina Carano as Cara Dune, Carl Weathers as Greef Karga, and Emily Swallow as the Armorer. Swallow previously appeared in "Chapter 1: The Mandalorian" and "Chapter 3: The Sin", but was credited as a guest star. Additional guest starring actors cast for this episode include Jason Sudeikis and Adam Pally as two bike scout troopers, Aidan Bertola as young Din Djarin, Alexandra Manea as Din Djarin's mother, Bernard Bullen as Din Djarin's father, and Brendan Wayne as a Mandalorian warrior. Wayne and Lateef Crowder are credited as stunt doubles for the Mandalorian. Rio Hackford is credited as performance artist IG-11, while Gene Freeman and Lauren Mary Kim are credited as stunt doubles for Greef Karga and the Armorer. "The Child" was performed by various puppeteers.

=== Filming and visual effects ===
Principal photography began in the first week of October 2018 in Southern California. Filming took place at the Manhattan Beach Studios in California under the working title Project Huckleberry, while also receiving a limited location filming in the area of Los Angeles. The series applies the StageCraft which was created with the intention of capturing the digital environments rendered on a video wall in real time in order to bring high quality images for the to final effects. Filming for the first season wrapped on February 27, 2019. Visual effects for the episode were created by Industrial Light & Magic (ILM), Base FX, ImagineEngine, MPC, Pixomondo, El Ranchito, Ghost FX, Hybride FX, and Important Looking Pirates. The development of the visual effects was supervised by Richard Bluff.

=== Music ===
A soundtrack album for the episode was released by digitally by Walt Disney Records on December 18, 2019, featuring Ludwig Göransson's score. On August 24, 2020, it was announced that Mondo would be releasing a limited edition for the complete score of the first season on vinyl edition, consisting of 8-CD discs for each episode with each one set pressed with a 180 Gram vinyl disc housed in it own jacket that features artwork by Paul Mann, while the box set is adorned with Mando's mudhorn Signet. The pre-orders for the soundtrack started on June 26, and finally released on December 15.

The Mandalorian: Chapter 8 (Original Score)
No.	Title	Length
1.	"Check Point"	1:21
2.	"Nurse Droid"	1:08
3.	"The Ewebb"	4:06
4.	"A Thousand Tears"	4:06
5.	"Nurse and Protect"	3:59
6.	"A Warrior's Death"	3:07
7.	"What Remains in the Tunnels"	3:10
8.	"Clan of Two"	3:32
9.	"Sacrifice"	3:29
10.	"Mando Flies"	2:04
11.	"The Baby"	3:20
Total length:		33:22

== Reception ==
=== Critical response ===
"Chapter 8: Redemption" received critical acclaim. On Rotten Tomatoes, the episode holds an approval rating of 100% with an average rating of 8.5/10, based on 29 reviews. The website's critics consensus reads, "The Mandalorian concludes with whiz-bang action and a heartening dose of "Redemption" while teasing tantalizing new adventures to come."

In a positive review, Tyler Hersko, of IndieWire, felt the episode had "heroism, sacrifice, humor, excitable nods to key franchise elements, and tantalizing teases of where the Disney+ show could go in Season 2." Alan Sepinwall, of Rolling Stone, felt that "The Mandalorian season finale, "Redemption", coming up just as soon as we make the baby do the magic hands." Spencer Kornhaber who wrote the episode's review for The Atlantic, praised the show for humanizing the robots and for finally showing the face of the titular character and stated that the Mandalorian "began as an amoral antihero who used gadgets to capture fugitives", but once he knew Baby Yoda he started to indirectly fight against the Empire as he became the main target. While reviewing for The Ringer, praised the episode for its emotional depth and ending, considering that Favreau "found a way to adjust in keeping the core" of dividing the light and dark with the concept of black-and-white. Katie Rife from The A.V. Club, stated that the season manages to partially conclude the storyline as the show leave many questions open that need to be solved in the following season and "with a satisfying conclusion layered on top of the impressively high level of craft in season one."

Sean Keane stated on CNET magazine praised the series' villains and ending, though he lamented the death of IG-11 even if he agreed that he had to go as he was too powerful. While writing the review for the Entertainment Weekly, Meaghan Kirby considered the finale to be satisfying and lauded Waititi's direction, and expressed hopes of getting the unsolved answers for the second season. For the Vulture magazine, Keith Phipps considered the final battle to be similar to the ones from the film and commented that "The Mandalorian has worked as an adventure-of-the-week episodic show, but these past two episodes have revealed those episodes as part of a grander design telling a cohesive story", that would serve as the setup for the second season which would define the future of Star Wars. Laura Prudom from IGN gave the episode a rating of 9.2 out of 10, and praised it for its action sequences, performances, and considered as a satisfactory conclusion to the saga. Thoug she gave some criticism for not solving all the answers and stated that the finale "doesn't offer us many answers - Baby Yoda's true species remains unknown, ensuring that nickname will stick around for the considerable future despite Disney's merchandise-branding efforts, and we're no closer to learning exactly what Moff Gideon wants him for". Despite that, Prudom expressed hope for the series direction.

Media reported on negative fan reactions to a scene where the scout trooper played by Jason Sudeikis punched "Baby Yoda".

=== Accolades ===
Award	Date of ceremony	Category	Recipient(s)	Result	Ref(s)
Hugo Awards	August 1, 2020	Best Dramatic Presentation – Short Form	Jon Favreau and Taika Waititi	Nominated	
Primetime Creative Arts Emmy Awards	September 14–17 & 19, 2020	Outstanding Character Voice-Over Performance	Taika Waititi as IG-11	Nominated	
Primetime Creative Arts Emmy Awards	September 14–17 & 19, 2020	Outstanding Guest Actor in a Drama Series	Giancarlo Esposito as Moff Gideon	Nominated	
Primetime Creative Arts Emmy Awards	September 14–17 & 19, 2020	Outstanding Music Composition for a Series	Ludwig Göransson	Won	
Primetime Creative Arts Emmy Awards	September 14–17 & 19, 2020	Outstanding Single-Camera Picture Editing for a Drama Series	Jeff Seibenick	Nominated	
