= The Mandalorian (disambiguation) =

The Mandalorian is a space western TV series set in the Star Wars universe.

The Mandalorian may also refer to:

- The Mandalorian (character), the series' title character
- "Chapter 1: The Mandalorian", the pilot episode of The Mandalorian
- The Mandalorian and Grogu, a 2026 feature film based on The Mandalorian TV series

== See also ==
- Mandalorians
