= The Armorer =

Fictional character

- Star Wars character
- Emily Swallow as the Armorer (Swal) in The Book of Boba Fett
- First appearance: "Chapter 1: The Mandalorian"; The Mandalorian; (2019)
- Created by: Jon Favreau
- Portrayed by: Emily Swallow
- Body double: Lauren Mary Kim

In-universe information
- Species: Human
- Gender: Female
- Occupation: Mandalorian tribe leader and armorer
- Affiliation: Children of the Watch

The Armorer is a fictional character in the Star Wars franchise who appears in the Disney+ television series The Mandalorian and The Book of Boba Fett. Dressed in red body armor and a gold helmet, she is the leader of a tribe of Mandalorian warriors, which includes the title character of The Mandalorian. A mysterious, patient, and intelligent character, the Armorer provides spiritual guidance for the clan, and forges and repairs their armor.

Jon Favreau, the creator and showrunner of The Mandalorian, was among the creators of the Armorer. The character was partially inspired by the films of Akira Kurosawa, as well as the history and culture of the samurai, particularly in the character's slow-paced movement and aura of authority. The Armorer is portrayed by Emily Swallow, who provides both the character's voice and live-action performance, while her stunts are performed by Lauren Mary Kim. When Swallow auditioned for the role, she knew little about the character and did not know it was for a Star Wars series.

The voice Swallow uses for the Armorer has elements of British and Mid-Atlantic accents, which stemmed from a suggestion made by a casting associate during her audition. She also partially modeled the Armorer's voice after characters from the Lord of the Rings film series. Aspects of The Mandalorian director Deborah Chow's personality influenced Swallow's performance. Kim's combat style in the Armorer's fight scenes was inspired by the Filipino martial art known as Kali.

The Armorer's costume took several weeks to make, and it proved to be challenging to perform in due to limited visibility and the fact that small movements in the costume were very noticeable. Swallow wore the helmet and armor costume for up to nine hours at a time during filming. The Armorer has been received positively by fans and reviewers alike and has been described as a fan favorite.

== Appearances ==
The Armorer appeared in three episodes in the first season of The Mandalorian. She is the leader of a tribe of Mandalorian warriors on the planet Nevarro, where they live in a secret enclave. She provides spiritual guidance for the clan, and forges and repairs their armor. Little is revealed about her backstory, and, like other Mandalorians, she wears highly durable armor and conceals her face with a helmet that she never publicly removes. The Mandalorians are in hiding after having suffered persecution by the Galactic Empire, and although the Empire has fallen out of power by the time of The Mandalorian, the clan has not yet regained its former status or power.

=== Operating on Nevarro ===
The Armorer made her first appearance in the series premiere "Chapter 1: The Mandalorian". The show's protagonist, a bounty hunter known simply as "The Mandalorian", brings her money he received from having collected his most recent bounties, including a bar of beskar steel, a very rare form of metal used to make Mandalorian armor. The Armorer explains that the Empire stole the beskar from the Mandalorians during an event known as "the Great Purge". She uses the beskar to make a single shoulder spaulder for the Mandalorian, and asks whether he has yet identified his "signet", a symbol used to identify clans of Mandalorians. When he says that he has not, she assures him that he will soon. The Armorer says the remaining beskar will be used to assist the "foundlings", a term for children who were not born Mandalorian but rather adopted into their culture. This pleases the Mandalorian because he was a foundling himself. As the Armorer works on his armor, the Mandalorian has flashbacks to his youth, when his family was killed.

The Armorer reappears in the episode "Chapter 3: The Sin", in which the Mandalorian brings her a large amount of beskar, which he received as a bounty for collecting a young alien known as "the Child" and turning him over to a remnant of the fallen Empire. The Armorer uses the steel to make a full cuirass for him. She also makes him a set of explosive projectiles called "whistling birds", named for the whistling noises they make as they fly toward their target. Another clan member named Paz Vizla reprimands the Mandalorian for working with the Empire to obtain the beskar, which leads to a brief fight between the two warriors. The Armorer quickly and quietly defuses the quarrel, reminding them the Empire no longer exists and that it is good the beskar has been returned to the tribe. She speaks about cowardice, honor, and the "Way of the Mandalore", which serves as the tribe's religion and creed. Later, off-screen, the Mandalorians on Nevarro are largely wiped out by the Imperial remnant after the tribe reveals itself at the conclusion of "Chapter 3: The Sin" to assist the Mandalorian. The Armorer is one of the few members of the clan to survive.

In the first-season finale "Chapter 8: Redemption", the Mandalorian and his allies come to the Mandalorian enclave while fleeing from attacking Imperials, only to find it unoccupied except for the Armorer, following the elimination of most of the tribe. The Armorer explains that some Mandalorian warriors may have survived and fled off-world. She is collecting the armor of the fallen Mandalorian warriors and melting it down for salvage. When the Mandalorian presents the Child and reveals he has supernatural powers, the Armorer tells him about the Jedi Order, of which most other characters in the show are not aware. She speaks of the history of the Jedi warriors and their past associations with the Way of the Mandalore, sharing a story from "eons past" about a battle between the Jedi and "Mandalore the Great", a mythological figure in Mandalorian culture. This marks the first time the Jedi are identified by name in The Mandalorian.

The Armorer instructs the Mandalorian to watch over and protect the Child, whom she calls a "foundling", as was the Mandalorian himself, once. She says honor demands that the Mandalorian seek out and deliver the Child to the others of his kind, and that until this occurs, the Mandalorian and the Child are a "clan of two", and that the Mandalorian will be like a father to him. She engraves onto the Mandalorian's pauldron the likeness of a Mudhorn, a type of creature the Mandalorian and the Child worked together to kill in "Chapter 2: The Child"; the Armorer declares it his signet. She also gives the Mandalorian his first jet pack. The Mandalorian invites the Armorer to flee with him, but she refuses to abandon the enclave until she has salvaged what remains. When the Mandalorian and his allies depart, the Armorer waits until five Stormtroopers armed with blasters enter the enclave and attempt to question her. Armed with nothing but her forging tools, the Armorer fights and kills all five in under a minute.

=== Operating on Glavis ===
The Armorer reappears in The Book of Boba Fett in "Chapter 5: Return of the Mandalorian". Now hiding in the ringworld of Glavis, the Armorer and Paz Vizla (the only two survivors of the massacre on Nevarro) are found by Din Djarin, who has recently completed his quest to deliver his foundling to the Jedi. In the course of his quest, Djarin also claimed the Darksaber, a lightsaber that acts as the ancestral blade of the Mandalorian ruler. Inspecting the Darksaber, after Din Djarin asked her about Bo-Katan Kryze, the Armorer explains her history and the saber prophecy to Djarin. He also provides her with the beskar spear which Ahsoka Tano had given him, a weapon the Armorer disapproved of since beskar was never meant as a weapon, just as armor. Djarin asks her to forge the spear into a gift for his foundling, Grogu. Later, the Armorer trains Djarin in the Darksaber's use, a weapon he struggles to master. She tells him that he isn't fighting with the blade, but against it. Paz Vizla challenges Djarin for the saber, as it was forged by his ancestor Tarre Vizsla, but loses. The Armorer asks both men whether they have ever removed their helmets as part of their creed. While Vizla never has, Djarin admits that he has. The Armorer banishes Djarin from the tribe, saying that he is no longer a Mandalorian. However, she informs Djarin that the only way of atonement is to come into contact with the Living Waters in the mines of Mandalore, but they were destroyed by the Empire during the Purge. Despite declaring Djarin an apostate, the Armorer allows him to keep his armor and the Darksaber.

=== Retaking Mandalore ===
The Armorer returns in "Chapter 17: The Apostate". At the covert's new hideout on a different planet, she forges a helmet for a young boy named Ragnar Vizsla, who is being accepted into the creed. The ceremony is later interrupted by an attack from a beast. She, along with other Mandalorians, try and fail to defend themselves from the beast until Din Djarin kills it with his N-1 starfighter. Djarin provides proof of the mines' existence, where the Living Waters are located and making his redemption possible. The Armorer agrees that he may be accepted back into the creed should he bathe in the Waters.

In "Chapter 19: The Convert", Djarin returns with Grogu and Bo-Katan Kryze to the covert with a sample of the Living Waters. Upon realizing that he has indeed visited the Waters, the Armorer accepts him back into the creed, while inducting Bo-Katan into the covert as she has also bathed in the Waters and not removed her helmet since. In "Chapter 20: The Foundling", The Armorer forges a new piece of Mandalorian armor for Grogu, a rondel bearing Djarin's mudhorn sigil. Later, The Armorer replaces Bo-Katan's pauldron, but the Armorer disbelieves Bo-Katan encounter's with the mythosaur.

In "Chapter 21: The Pirate", the Armorer says to Bo-Katan Kryze that she is the one who will reunite all Mandalorians. In "Chapter 23: The Spies", the Children of the Watch and the Nite Owls, now united through Bo-Katan, head to Mandalore. The Armorer assists in bringing wounded Mandalorians back to the fleet while others head to the Great Forge, where they are ambushed by Moff Gideon and his men, resulting in Djarin being captured and Paz Vizsla losing his life.

In "Chapter 24: The Return", the Armorer takes part in taking Mandalore back from Moff Gideon. Following Moff Gideon's demise, the Armorer officially finishes Ragnar's initiation at the waters within Mandalore's mines. At the persuasion of Djarin, the Armorer allows Grogu to become his apprentice. The Armorer is later seen when Bo-Katan reignites the Great Forge of Mandalore.

== Characterization ==
The Armorer is a mysterious and enigmatic character, with a calm and patient temperament, and a Zen-like personality. She is very intelligent and knows how to act quickly in complex situations. She observes what is happening around her and only speaks when necessary, and although she displays knowledge of many different things – from the Mandalorian's past to the history of the Jedi – she often does not reveal her knowledge until she believes the time is right. Swallow said of this: "she will reveal it in good time, but no one's going to get any information out of her without her being good and ready". She is very slow-paced in her movements, and displays what Swallow calls a "simplicity [and] efficiency of movement".

The Armorer plays a relatively small role in the first season of The Mandalorian, but an important one, repeatedly setting the title character on the correct path of his hero's journey. She is the leader of the Mandalorian tribe, providing guidance and direction to a clan that has lost its way after the now fallen Empire persecuted them. She does so by reminding them of their moral code and set of values, and encouraging them to regard each other as a family. The Armorer is the first person in the series to say "This is the Way", which serves as a credo for the Mandalorian clan, and is repeated throughout the first season. She believes strongly in Mandalorian traditions, and is dedicated to ensuring the survival of her tribe, serving as their spiritual leader and as their armorer.

Although strong Mandalorian women had previously been featured in such animated series as Star Wars: The Clone Wars and Star Wars Rebels, Swallow felt the Armorer was the first female Star Wars character to serve as the "spiritual leader" in the same vein as Obi-Wan Kenobi and Yoda.

The Armorer is confident and comfortable in her leadership position and conveys unwavering authority with little effort. Swallow said of this: "One of the coolest things for me in playing her is trusting that she does have that authority without having to be very forceful at all". This is illustrated by how she breaks up a fight between Mandalorian warriors in "Chapter 3: The Sin", without raising her voice or physically interfering.

This also demonstrates that she is well-respected by the members of her tribe, which Comic Book Resources writer Narayan Liu said is particularly impressive because "in such a focused warrior society, it would conceivably take a lot to command the respect of one's comrades". The Armorer's voice conveys a sense of authority, mystery, and sophistication, and Swallow said she enjoys the contrast between her educated accent and warrior lifestyle, saying: "There's just a lot of seeming contradictions about her that I love".

Swallow, as well as several reviewers, have noted that the fact that the tribe's armor is crafted by its leader, rather than a trade worker, speaks to the importance of armor and the warrior status in Mandalorian culture. Liu wrote of this: "Who better to forge Mandalorian armor and weaponry than one with experience, who fully understands its importance to the Mandalorian culture in this hostile galaxy?"

Swallow feels that through her creation and maintenance of the armor, the Armorer is effectively the keeper of their history and rituals, because "she actually has a record based on what it is that she's made". That role is even more important at the time of The Mandalorian, Swallow said, since much of the Mandalorian society has been suppressed and destroyed by the Empire.

In addition to her expertise at foundry work the Armorer is an excellent fighter, displaying great strength and speed as well as particularly honed skills with melee weapons, as seen in her fight with stormtroopers in "Chapter 8: Redemption". Since the character had been so quiet for much of the first season of The Mandalorian, Swallow believes it was a shock when the Armorer fights stormtroopers as well as she does.

Liu argued that the Armorer was the most efficient fighter in the series, even more so than the Mandalorian or other fighter characters like Cara Dune. Liu wrote: "None so far seem more suited to handle the hostility of the Empire and the merciless desert than the guiding hand to the Mandalorians, the Armorer, who, in the season finale, proved that she's the best of the best".

== Concept and creation ==
=== Conception ===
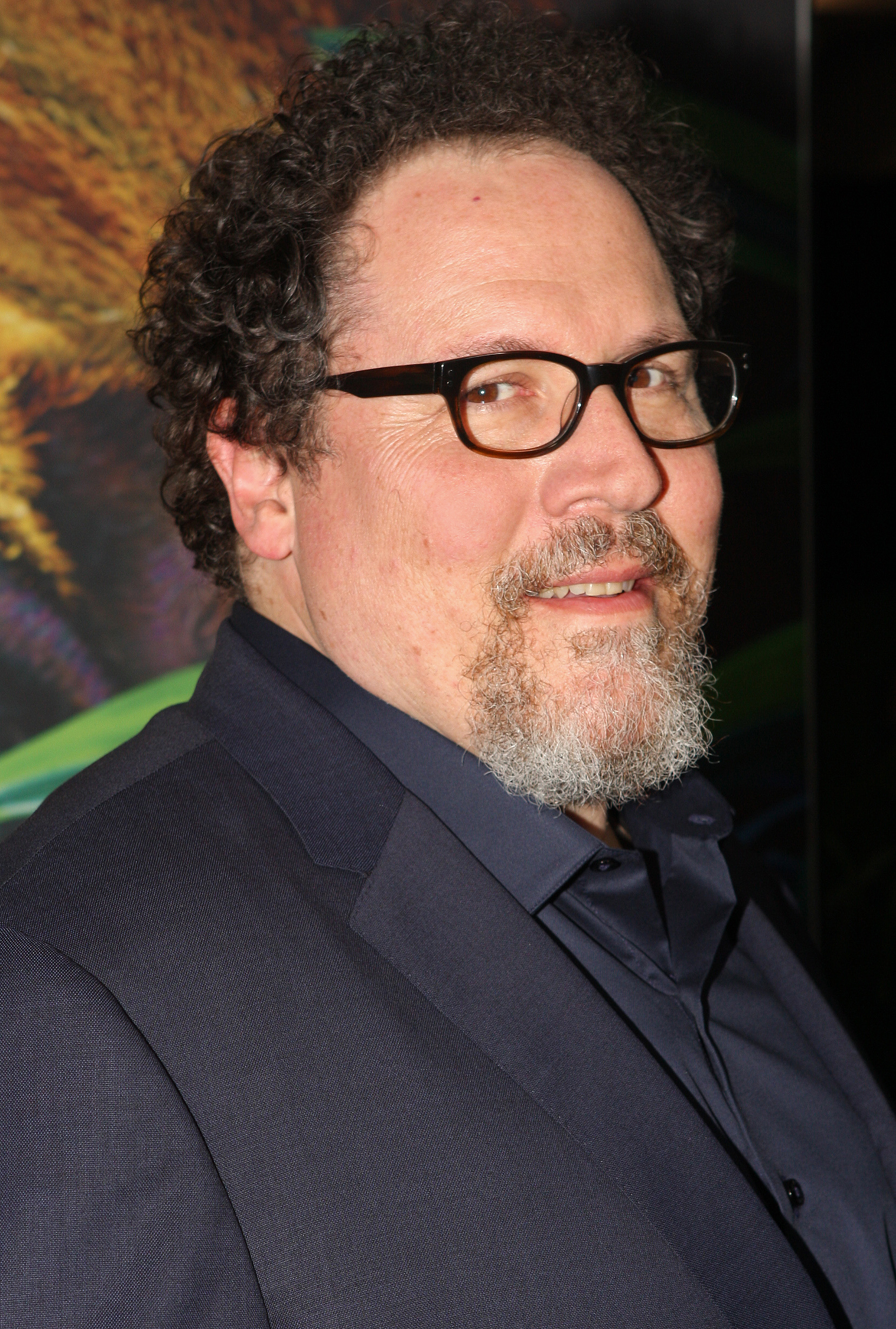
The Armorer was created by Jon Favreau, the creator and showrunner of The Mandalorian.

Jon Favreau, the creator and showrunner of The Mandalorian, was among the creators of the Armorer. Creation of the character, as well as other elements of the series, was influenced by the films of Japanese director Akira Kurosawa. The Armorer in particular drew influence from the history and culture of the samurai, especially in the character's slow-paced movement, sense of ceremony, and aura of authority. Favreau and others involved in the show debated what gender to establish for the character, and ultimately decided to make her a woman, but Swallow said they "didn't want to make it a big deal". She said: "I think they just sort of felt like, 'Why not?'" The animated series Star Wars: The Clone Wars had also featured several strong female Mandalorian characters and leaders, which Swallow said may also have been a consideration in determining the Armorer's gender.

=== Portrayal ===
The Armorer is portrayed by actress Emily Swallow, who provides both the character's voice and live-action performance. Her stunts were performed by Lauren Mary Kim, who was also the stunt performer for various other characters on The Mandalorian.

Swallow auditioned for the role, but she knew little about her character or the series at the time of her audition. The character was described as having a recurring role in a Disney series, which was identified only by the code name "Untitled High Budget". It was not disclosed that it was a Star Wars show, though Swallow's agent suspected that might be the case. Swallow was given only a six-word description of the Armorer character in advance of the audition: "Leader. Strong. Zen, but with authority". However, a casting associate at the audition gave her a little bit more backstory for the character, which Swallow said was helpful. Although she said the audition itself was fairly "low-key" and "mundane", with only her and a single casting associate, she was given only a handful of scenes to perform but little context about how they fit into the overall story of the show, which she described as "bizarre". Swallow later reflected that it was good she did not know it was a Star Wars project because she felt it would have made her more nervous, and instead she was able to approach the audition like any other.

The scene she read in her audition was a variation of the scene in "Chapter 3: The Sin" in which she breaks up a fight among members of the Mandalorian clan, though the final scene was changed slightly when adapted to television. Her audition dialogue included the Armorer's line "This is the Way", which would become one of the most popular lines of the series. The casting company made clear the character would be masked, in case some actors opposed having their faces concealed. Swallow previously did mask training in graduate school acting classes at New York University Tisch School of the Arts, but this marked the first time she had used the training on television, which she called an interesting challenge. Favreau believed Swallow's mask training was evident in her performance.

In preparation for the role, Swallow re-watched the original Star Wars films, which she admired, saying: "I still get so completely swept up in them, in the heart of them, and so to be a part of that legacy is incredible". She also watched shows like Star Wars: The Clone Wars, which she had not seen before, and she tried to conduct internet research about the history of the Mandalorians, but found it difficult because "as soon as you google anything related to Star Wars there are infinite rabbit holes you can go down", so she regularly questioned The Mandalorian executive producer Dave Filoni about the history of Star Wars and whether certain actions were consistent with the continuity. Due to his past work in other Star Wars series, Swallow called him "an encyclopedia of Star Wars knowledge", and said it was a comfort to be able to draw upon his expertise.

Although Swallow herself is American, the voice she uses for the Armorer has elements of British and Mid-Atlantic accents. This stemmed in part from her audition, when a casting associate asked her to try some takes with a British accent since they had mostly been considering British actresses for the role before her. Swallow had experience performing with a British accent from her theater work, as well as on the animated series Castlevania. She also partially modeled the Armorer's voice after characters from the Lord of the Rings film series. Swallow believes the Armorer's accent conveys authority and mystery, though she added: "Maybe it's because I'm American that I think that it's so interesting". Swallow also brought a subtlety to the part that she said was influenced to a certain extent by her previous work on the television series Supernatural, where she played a powerful primordial entity named Amara. Swallow said while playing the part, she realized Amara seemed more powerful if her movements were minimal and deliberate, and she applied this same approach to the Armorer.

Swallow drew some inspiration for her performance as the Armorer from the personality of Deborah Chow, who directed the episode "Chapter 3: The Sin" and was the first woman to direct a live-action Star Wars story. Swallow said she particularly drew from Chow's "intense curiosity", as well as the way she conveyed authority and commanded a room "in a very graceful and simple way". Swallow felt the Armorer had this same effect by the way, particularly by the way she breaks up the fight in "Chapter 3: The Sin" without even raising her voice. Swallow said she did not realize how much Chow influenced her performance and interpretation of the Armorer until later when reporters asked her about the origins of the character. Chow did not know this herself until informed by a reporter, after which she said it was a great compliment. Chow has praised Swallow's performance and called the Armorer "such a great character".

=== Costume ===
The Armorer costume is predominantly red body armor, along with a gold helmet punctuated with tiny horn-like spikes. The helmet has a T-shaped visor similar to those of all Mandalorians, as first featured on the popular Star Wars character Boba Fett. However, Vanity Fair writer Anthony Breznican observed that her helmet is more ornate and elegant than those of other Mandalorian characters on the series, which he believed was meant to communicate an aura of leadership and regality. It is stylized more like an ancient Spartan warrior than the others, particularly around the visor. The costume also includes thick red gloves for welding and foundry work, as well as a fur shoulder piece, which Emily Swallow said she liked, but "it sure doesn't seem very practical for somebody who is surrounded by fire all the time". The costume tapers below the waist in a fashion similar to a skirt, though one with what Swallow calls a "strong, powerful quality that doesn't call too much attention" to itself.

The Armorer's costume took several weeks to make. Swallow called it an "incredible process", and was impressed by the attention to detail. Swallow first saw sketches of the costume a few weeks before filming began, and she said "my breath was taken away", adding: "I feel like it's one of the most amazing combinations of elegant and powerful that I've ever seen in a costume". The costume was designed to give the character a sense of regality and communicate her position of leadership and authority over the other Mandalorians. Pedro Pascal, the actor who plays the title character on The Mandalorian, jokingly said upon first seeing the Armorer's costume on set: "Wait a minute, why does she get to look so much cooler?"

Swallow has said the experience of wearing the costume is "not nearly as dignified as it translates on film". It was often difficult to move in it, and the helmet provided very little peripheral vision. Even simply walking across the room was difficult because of the limited visibility, and because Swallow could not look down, she often feared she was going to trip, though her character's deliberately slow walking pace helped avoid doing so. Swallow said: "I'm really glad that it looks as dignified and impressive as it does, because being inside of it feels ridiculous". She and the other Mandalorian actors would occasionally bump into each other, hit their helmets against each other, or trip over each other. Swallow said: "I really hope that at some point they release a bloopers reel, because when you put like two or more Mandalorians in a room together, chaos ensues".

=== Filming ===
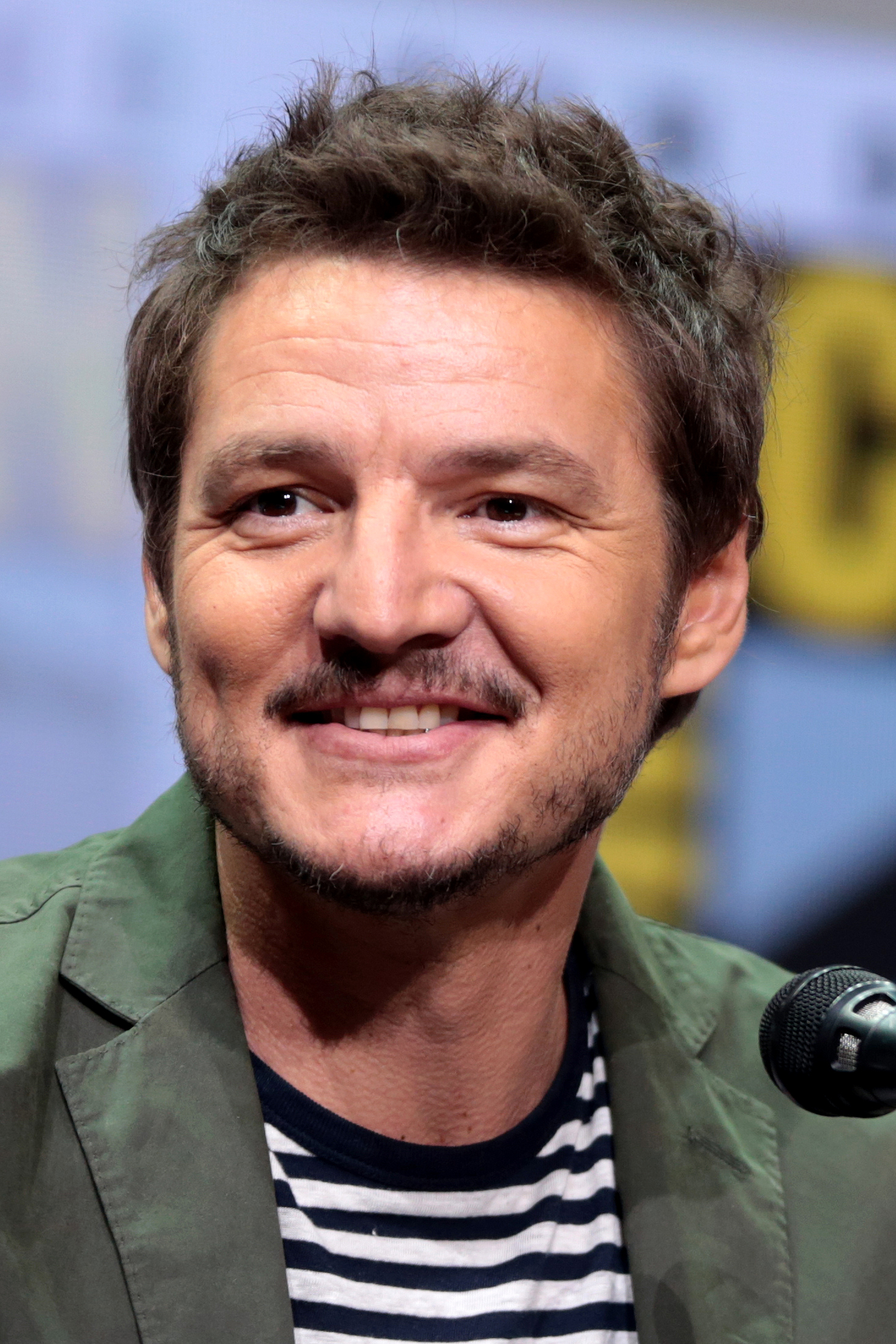
Before The Mandalorian, Emily Swallow and Pedro Pascal (pictured) had known each other from the New York theatre scene, and both having appeared on the show The Mentalist at the same time.

All of the Armorer's scenes were filmed and completed more than a year before The Mandalorian was publicly announced, which Swallow described as "liberating" because she did not feel pressure stemming from publicity or the Star Wars fan community. Before shooting began, Swallow spent time discussing the character with Jon Favreau and Dave Filoni. She was not provided with a detailed backstory about the Armorer, but they described for her the inspirations behind the character, which she said was useful for her performance. Swallow credited Favreau with creating a comfortable and collaborative filming environment, in which no one felt pressure despite the enormity of the Star Wars franchise, but rather excitement and a desire to make a quality product. Swallow felt there was a "magical" feeling and "giddy playfulness" on the set unlike any other she had experienced before, and she said it reminded her of "being a kid and playing Princess Leia". Favreau was present when most of the scenes with the Armorer were shot, and Swallow felt he did a good job of keeping everyone on the same consistent path, but also allowing each of the directors to bring their own unique style and abilities to their episodes.

Swallow said filming The Mandalorian was the most secretive process in which she had ever been involved, to the point she could not even tell her family or friends what she was making. Swallow was initially provided only portions of the episode that involved her character, and only later was she allowed to read the scripts for the full episodes. When she wanted to read the scripts, she had to access a web portal, which tracked when she logged on and for how long. During the filming, the production staff was even more stringent with secrecy because photos from the set had recently leaked to the Internet, and paparazzi photographers were on the rooftops around the studio. Whenever Swallow walked around the lot while wearing her costume, she had to conceal herself by wearing a black cloak with a hood, which she called her "cloak of invisibility". Swallow knew little about the show outside of the scenes specifically involving her character, and she did not know certain cast members were even in the show until they were later announced in news releases.

A microphone was fitted inside the helmet so she could deliver dialogue while filming. Unlike most roles Swallow has played, she was not required to wear make-up or have her hair styled to portray the Armorer because the character is masked, which is something the actress appreciated. However, she wore the helmet and armor costume for up to nine hours at a time during filming. The costume was not heavy, but the helmet was fitted with foam padding so it fits closely to Swallow's head, and she occasionally asked to remove the helmet between takes because she felt claustrophobic. Portraying emotion was a challenge because her face was completely obscured, so she could not use her eyes or facial expressions. During filming she quickly learned that small movements could make a large impact due to the costume, which she believed was beneficial for her performance, but also presented challenges because minor gestures could become distracting or convey the wrong emotion. During the filming of the first episode in particular, Swallow said, the actors portraying Mandalorians had to "learn on the fly" how to master these movements and determine how they appeared on camera.

Several months of preparation work and rehearsal were done in advance of filming the actual sets. The Armorer's scenes for "Chapter 1: The Mandalorian" and "Chapter 3: The Sin" were shot concurrently with each other, with episode directors Filoni and Deborah Chow, respectively, alternating shoots on the set. Swallow said Chow in particular gave her time to try different things and explore the character. The Armorer's scenes were filmed on sound stages, with settings designed to resemble tunnels and sewers. Swallow said she and the other actors portraying Mandalorians had to develop a type of "language" for their masks and armor costumes. She occasionally dropped props like her tongs or hammer due to her thick gloves. Scenes with her hammering metal or putting things into fire took a long time to prepare and film due to mobility challenges with the costume. The fire was not real, but rather a digital effect added later. Swallow and the filmmakers spent a considerable amount of time discussing how the Armorer would handle the beskar steel in "Chapter 3: The Sin", including such details as how she could look at it and stack it. Since the material is an important part of Mandalorian culture and history, the character treats it with a type of reverence, but it is also tainted due to its previous association with the Empire, with the filmmakers comparing it to Nazi gold. Swallow felt her character's handling of the steel purified it and returned it to its past noble standing.

The Armorer's fight scene against five stormtroopers at the end of "Chapter 8: Redemption" was performed by stunt performer Lauren Mary Kim. The Armorer's combat style in the scene was inspired by the Filipino martial art known as Kali. It was the Armorer's only moment in the first season in which Swallow was not the one wearing the costume for the entirety of the scene. Swallow told the show's fight coordinator that she would be willing to undertake martial arts training and perform a portion of the scene, but she was told the stunts would require years of training. Swallow trained in Kali for a few weeks and did as much as possible, such as the transitions before and after the fight scene. Swallow and Pedro Pascal knew each other prior to filming The Mandalorian. They were familiar with each other through the New York theatre scene, and both appeared on the show The Mentalist at the same time. Swallow was a fan of Taika Waititi, who directed "Chapter 8: Redemption", and she expressed her admiration for him and his work but tried not to be too effusive because, she said, "the Armorer doesn't really fangirl, I think". In the first-season finale, The Armorer appeared in scenes with the animatronic puppet used to portray "The Child", who became a viral sensation with fans and became affectionately known as "Baby Yoda". Swallow said she "fell in love with it like everybody else", adding: "I was thrilled when they brought him in that little bag for the scene that I got to have with it. I just wanted to snuggle it". Swallow met Star Wars creator George Lucas during one of her filming days after he visited the set as a surprise for Favreau's birthday. Sometime after her scenes were filmed, she did dubbing for parts of her dialogue in a recording studio in New York.

== Cultural impact ==
=== Critical reception ===
The Armorer has been received positively by fans and reviewers alike and has been described as a fan favorite. Narayan Liu of Comic Book Resources called the Armorer the strongest character on The Mandalorian, and described her fight with stormtroopers at the end of the season finale as one of her greatest moments in the show so far. Liu wrote: "There are a wide variety of bounty hunters and trained soldiers that appear throughout the series, but the Armorer is unmatched". Brian Silliman of Syfy Wire called the Armorer "one of the more interesting characters featured thus far" in The Mandalorian and "a fantastic addition to the lore of the galaxy far, far away". He complimented Emily Swallow's ability to portray emotion despite her face being concealed, and was particularly impressed by how Swallow and Pedro Pascal forge an emotional connection in their scenes despite both wearing masks. Charlie Ridgely of Comicbook.com "said fans became invested in the Armorer from her first appearance, and that she gained more depth as the series progressed. He described her as "the most mysterious and intriguing" of the Mandalorian characters, as well as one of the "most dangerous characters in the show". Judith Anne Dela Cruz of Epicstream called the Armorer an "intriguing" character, writing: "There's definitely tons of cool characters in The Mandalorian, but a number of Star Wars fans have their eyes drawn to The Armorer".

Armaan Babu of MEA WorldWide wrote: "The Mandalorian introduces a wide array of new characters to the Star Wars universe, but perhaps none so commanding as The Armorer". Matt Berger called the Armorer one of the biggest surprises from the series premiere of The Mandalorian, and that her crafting of the Mandalorian armor was one of the "most mesmerizing sequences" of the episode. He also wrote that the Armorer had "one of the most unique looks to any Mandalorian that the Star Wars world has ever seen". Q.V. Hough of Screen Rant said the Armorer played a "small but integral role", noting her importance in advancing the story and setting the Mandalorian on his path. Nick Venable of CinemaBlend said he was intrigued by the interpersonal relationship between the Armorer and the Mandalorian. Charles Ridgely of Comicbook.com praised Lauren May Kim's stunt work as the Armorer, describing her fight scene with stormtroopers in "Chapter 8: Redemption" as "epic" and saying she "had fans jumping out of their seats". Screen Rant writer Jessie Atkin expressed hope that the Armorer would return for the second season of The Mandalorian and that additional details about the character and her backstory would be provided. The Armorer was ranked seventh on a Screen Rant list of the most interesting characters from the first season of The Mandalorian, eighth on a separate list of the ten best characters from the show, and third on a list of "10 Characters We Hope To See Return In Season 2". Additionally, the Armorer's armor was ranked tenth on a Screen Rant list of the ten best costumes in the first season of The Mandalorian.

Swallow said most of the direct feedback she has received and seen about the Armorer has been positive. She has attended Star Wars fan conventions since the release of the show and said she has been "greeted with so much joy and positivity", particularly from young girls who appreciated that the Armorer is a "badass warrior". Swallow said she has been particularly impressed by fan art of the character that she had been sent on social media, including drawings of the Armorer and models constructed resembling her armor. Swallow has shared some of this fan art on her own social media account, including a drawing of the Armorer fighting stormtroopers, and an image of the Armorer making a gesture similar to Rosie the Riveter in the "We Can Do It!" poster. Although Swallow has appeared in franchises with large fanbases before, such as Supernatural, she said the level of fandom for Star Wars was bigger than anything she had ever done. Swallow said it has been "liberating" to portray a character in a mask because there is no attention paid to her physical appearance in reviews and among fans, saying: "Nobody cares how I look. They love the character so much, and it's really kind of freeing". Unlike on Supernatural, Swallow does not get recognized in public for her connection with The Mandalorian, which she enjoys.

The line "This is the Way", first spoken by the Armorer and repeated by her several times throughout her appearances, became one of the most popular and oft-quoted lines of dialogue from The Mandalorian. Silliman said even after just one week, the line was being spoken "everywhere". Fans often request that Swallow write the catchphrase when she signs autographs. Swallow said she first realized the line was a hit when she attended the premiere of The Mandalorian in Los Angeles on November 13. During a screening of "Chapter 3: The Sin", when one of the Mandalorians says "This is the Way" during the final climactic battle, the entire audience repeated the line back to the screen, after which Swallow said, 'OK, I think we have something here.'" She said of the phrase: "It's pretty fun to have something that seems to be lodged in people's psyche as a real phrase for all The Mandalorian people". There has been a great deal of speculation among fans as to the identity of the Armorer. Some have theorized she is Sabine Wren, a Mandalorian warrior and one of the main cast members of the animated television series Star Wars Rebels. Others have argued the horns on her golden helmet and the red color of her armor are references to Darth Maul, a Star Wars antagonist who at one time ruled the Mandalorians. Maul is a member of the species Zabrak, all of whom have an array of small horns atop their heads similar to those on the Armorer's helmet, leading to speculation she may be a Zabrak herself or at the very least a former member of the Shadow Collective.

Following the airing of "Chapter 23: The Spies," several reviewers and fans started speculating that the character could actually be revealed as a villain, specifically as a spy of Moff Gideon, given how Moff Gideon wore a horned Mandalorian helmet reminiscent of hers, in addition to claims of how the Armorer had had a share of mysterious actions since her very first appearance in the series premiere up to that point, such as sending Din Djarin to look for a Jedi alongside Grogu in a search that culminated in Gideon capturing Grogu, disappearing after Gideon's forces attack Nevarro in the first season finale until resurfacing in a space station in the show's spin-off, The Book of Boba Fett, telling Djarin to redeem himself by bathing in Mandalore's waters despite those waters supposedly no longer existing, flexibly allowing Bo-Katan Kryze to join her coven despite the years of animosity between her Mandalorians and Bo-Katan's, volunteering to go to Mandalore with the Mandalorians led by Djarin and Kryze despite never leaving for any missions, conveniently not being with her people when Gideon ambushes them at the Great Forge, Gideon being aware of their combined fleet despite Mandalore's atmosphere interfering with any comms and Gideon having beskar Mandalorian armors forged for his forces; all these instances have been deemed as purported foreshadowings to reveal the character's true allegiances in the third season finale. The possibility of the Armorer turning out to be a villain led fan speculation to reinforce the theory that the Armorer could be The Clone Wars character Rook Kast, who was an ally of Darth Maul who knew about the existence of the Death Watch and the Jedi, though such possibility would cause questions on how Kast escaped from Bo-Katan's imprisonment at the end of the Clone Wars, why would Bo-Katan not recognize her voice or if the Children of the Watch derived themselves from the Shadow Collective. Others, however, theorized that the Armorer could turn out to not be evil and instead give up her life to save her people with some other character like Axe Woves, the Armorer's Tribe and the Nite Owls actually collaborating with Gideon's Imperial remnant all this time, or even the Armorer and Gideon themselves being former Death Watch members who supported Maul like Gar Saxon and who have been manipulating all Mandalorians with a fake creed.

=== Merchandise ===
A Funko Pop figurine of the Armorer was announced on December 31, 2019.

A Star Wars: The Black Series action figure was released during Hasbro's September 2020 PulseCon.
