= Chapter 1: The Mandalorian =

- The Mandalorian episode
- Promotional poster
- Episode no.: Season 1 Episode 1
- Directed by: Dave Filoni
- Written by: Jon Favreau
- Cinematography by: Greig Fraser
- Editing by: Jeff Seibenick
- Original release date: November 12, 2019
- Running time: 37 minutes

Co-starring
- Carl Weathers as Greef Karga; Werner Herzog as The Client; Omid Abtahi as Dr. Pershing; Emily Swallow as the Armorer; Nick Nolte as the voice of Kuiil; Taika Waititi as the voice of IG-11

Episode chronology
← Previous —	Next → "Chapter 2: The Child"
- The Mandalorian season 1

"Chapter 1: The Mandalorian" is the first episode of the first season and series premiere of the American streaming television series The Mandalorian. It was written by the series' showrunner Jon Favreau and directed by Dave Filoni. The episode takes place in the Star Wars universe five years after the events of Return of the Jedi (1983). In the episode, it follows a lone bounty hunter only known as the Mandalorian, who accepts a mission given by a mysterious Client who tasks him to bring alive a fifty-year-old target. He is helped by vapor farmer Kuiil in exchange of ending the constant bounty hunting activity in his area.

It stars Pedro Pascal as the Mandalorian. The episode also features co-stars Carl Weathers, Werner Herzog, Omid Abtahi, Emily Swallow, Nick Nolte, and Taika Waititi. Favreau was hired to be the showrunner of the series in March 2018, while Filoni joined the series to direct two episodes for the season in October. Favreau and Filoni are also the executive producers of the series alongside Kathleen Kennedy and Colin Wilson.

"Chapter 1: The Mandalorian" was released on the streaming service Disney+ on November 12, 2019. The episode received largely positive reviews from critics, with praise towards Pascal's performance, action sequences, musical score, and cinematography. It received several accolades, including two Primetime Emmy Awards.

== Plot ==
Five years after the fall of the Empire, (Note: As depicted in Return of the Jedi (1983).) a Mandalorian bounty hunter collects a fugitive (and saves the fugitive's life) after a scuffle in a bar on the ice planet Pagodon and returns to the planet Nevarro in his ship, the Razor Crest. He meets Greef Karga, leader of the bounty hunters' guild, but is dismayed that the only bounties available will not even cover the cost of fuel for his ship. In desperation, he accepts a mysterious commission, for which Karga can only provide an address, to meet the Client.

The Client, who uses former Imperial stormtroopers as bodyguards, gives the Mandalorian a vague target to bring back alive. The only information he is allowed to give is an age—50 years old—and last known location. In exchange, The Client promises to reward the bounty hunter with a container full of beskar, a rare metal used by Mandalorians to forge their armor. Receiving a single bar of beskar as a down payment, the Mandalorian meets with the Armorer at an enclave housing fellow Mandalorians. The Armorer, who melts the metal into a pauldron reserved for the Mandalorian, says the metal was gathered in The Great Purge and the excess will sponsor foundlings, as the Mandalorian once was.

The Mandalorian travels to the desert planet Arvala-7 and meets a moisture farmer named Kuiil who wants to be rid of the vicious outlaws and mercenaries hiding in the area. Kuiil teaches the Mandalorian to ride a Blurrg, as there are no land-speed vehicles to traverse the area and sends him to where his bounty is located. Upon reaching the hideout, the Mandalorian grudgingly teams up with IG-11, a bounty droid hunting for the same target. They manage to clear the entire facility of its Nikto guards and discover that the bounty is a green, big-eared childlike creature. IG-11 then reveals that its orders are to kill the child. Despite being offered a share of the reward, the Mandalorian instead chooses to shoot the droid.

== Production ==
=== Development ===
Lucasfilm and Disney announced the development of a new live action Star Wars series that would be released for their streaming service Disney+ in November 2017. The series would be focused in the Mandalorians exploring the "scum and villainy" of the Star Wars universe taking place five years after the events of the film Return of the Jedi (1983). The series would later reveal its official title The Mandalorian alongside the official premise. Lucasfilm president Kathleen Kennedy saw the opportunity of the series to allow a diverse group of writers and directors to create their own Star Wars stories. In March 2018, Jon Favreau was hired by Lucasfilm to be the head writer of the series, while Dave Filoni was announced to direct two episodes for the series by October. Filoni make his live-action directorial debut in the episode, who is known for his work on the Star Wars: The Clone Wars series and Star Wars Rebels. Favreau and Filoni executive produce the series, alongside Kennedy and Colin Wilson. The first season's first episode titled "Chapter 1: The Mandalorian", was written by Favreau, and was released on Disney+ on November 12, 2019.

=== Writing ===
The episode takes place five years after the events of Return of the Jedi in the year of 9 ABY in the franchise's timeline. The reason of taking the timeline was due to the producers considering that there's a lot of story to tell between the events of Return of the Jedi and The Force Awakens. For the creation of the series, Favreau took inspiration from several western and samurai films as for the development of the series. The main character of the series, the Mandalorian was mostly influenced by Clint Eastwood's character the Man with No Name and the samurai characters from Akira Kurosawa films. During the creation of the character, Favreau attempted to match the look and aesthetics used in the original Star Wars trilogy, particularly the first film, Star Wars (1977). Favreau describes the character as "a lone gunfighter in the outer reaches of the galaxy far from the authority of the New Republic".

For the episode, Favreau took inspiration from several western and samurai films to create some of the scenes of the films. The Mandalorian is forced to team up with a bounty droid IG-11 in order to manage to reach the asset that both are looking for. The scene is a direct reference of the film For a Few Dollars More (1965) where the Man with No Name (Manco is the nickname he uses for the film) is forced to team up with another bounty hunter. These plot point would be reused for the season's finale for the episode "Chapter 8: Redemption", and the second season's sixth episode "Chapter 14: The Tragedy". The Big Country (1958) also serves as an influence for the series, for the scene where the Mandalorian is trained to ride a Blurrg by Kuiil, similarly when James McKay is trained to ride a horse by a more experienced rancher. The film also references The Wild Bunch (1969), for the scene where the Mandalorian and IG-11 are forced to fight a small army of enemies in a small town and the main character uses a cannon to finish the enemies, which is reminiscent to the brutal battle sequence at "Agua Verde".

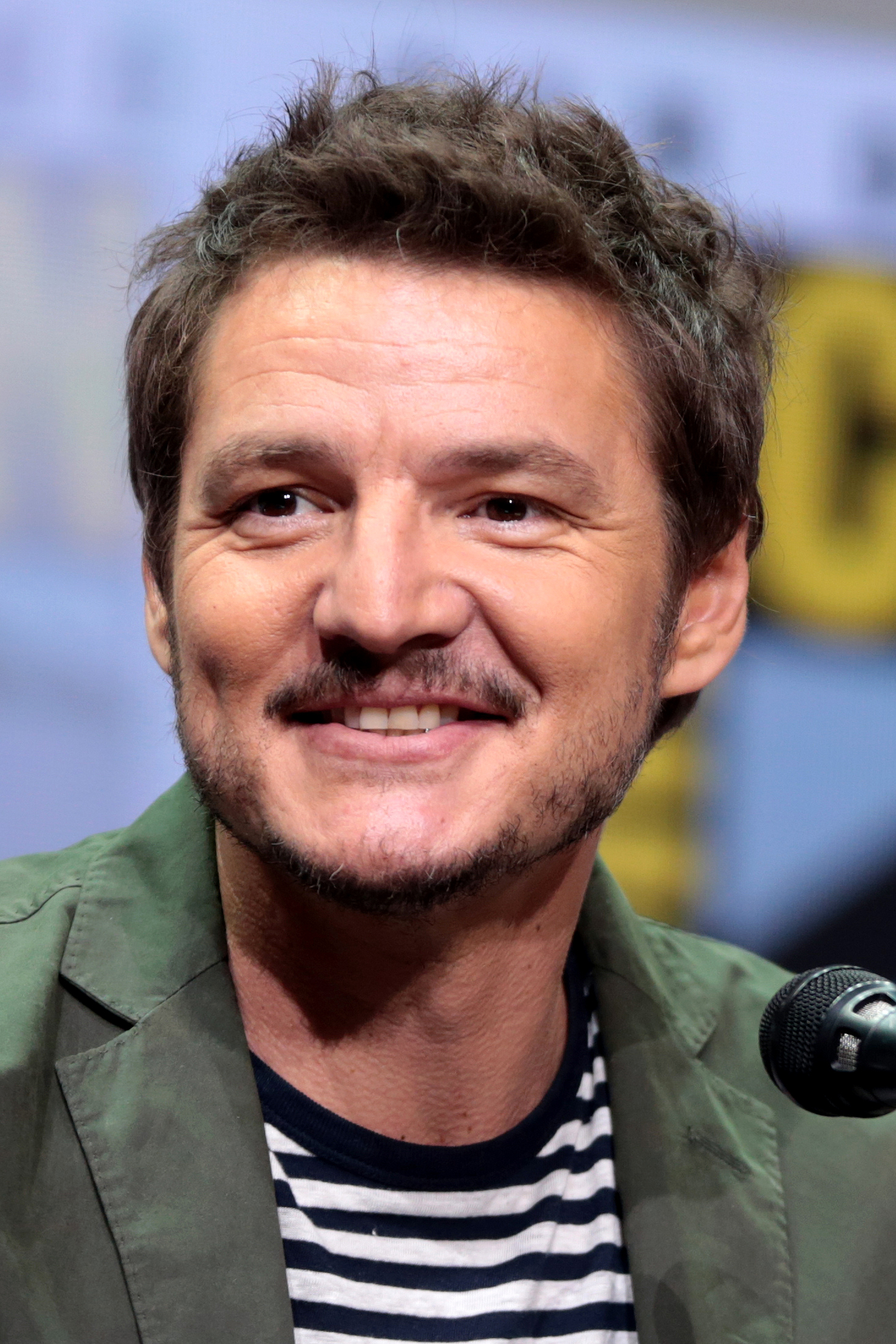
Pedro Pascal portrays the titular Mandalorian in the series.

=== Casting ===
In November 2018, it was announced that Pedro Pascal had been cast as The Mandalorian, the protagonist of the series. After meeting with Favreau, Pascal initially thought he would be playing Boba Fett. Also in November 2018, it was announced that Nick Nolte had been cast as the voice of Kuiil. On December 12, 2018, it was announced that Carl Weathers, Werner Herzog, and Omid Abtahi had joined the main cast as Greef Karga, The Client, and Dr. Pershing, respectively. On March 21, 2019, Taika Waititi was revealed to be recording a voice for the series, speculated to be bounty hunter droid IG-88, but which turned out to be a new character named IG-11.

Additional guest starring actors cast for this episode include John Beasley as a bartender, Horatio Sanz as a Mythrol bounty, Tait Fletcher as Alpha Trawler, Ryan Watson as Beta Trawler, Dmitrious Bistrevsky as Quarren Trawler, Christopher Bartlett as a ferryman, Brian Posehn as a speeder pilot, and Emily Swallow as The Armorer. Brendan Wayne and Lateef Crowder are credited as stunt doubles for The Mandalorian. Both worked closely with Pascal to develop the character's movements. Misty Rosas and Rio Hackford are credited as performance artists for Kuiil and IG-11, respectively. "The Child" was performed by various puppeteers.

=== Filming and visual effects ===
Principal photography began in the first week of October 2018 in Southern California. Filming took place at the Manhattan Beach Studios in California under the working title Project Huckleberry, while also receiving a limited location filming in the area of Los Angeles. The series applies the StageCraft which was created with the intention of capturing the digital environments rendered on a video wall in real time in order to bring high quality images for the to final effects. Greig Fraser was the sole director of photography for the first and third episodes, which were filmed together at the same time. Filming for the first season wrapped on February 27, 2019. Visual effects for the episode were created by Industrial Light & Magic (ILM), Base FX, Image Engine, MPC, Pixomondo, El Ranchito, Ghost FX, Hybride FX, and Important Looking Pirates. The development of the visual effects was supervised by Richard Bluff.

=== Music ===
A soundtrack album for the episode was released by digitally by Walt Disney Records on November 12, 2019, featuring Ludwig Göransson's score. On August 24, 2020, it was announced that Mondo would be releasing a limited edition for the complete score of the first season on vinyl edition, consisting of 8-CD discs for each episode with each one set pressed with a 180 Gram vinyl disc housed in its own jacket that features artwork by Paul Mann, while the box set is adorned with Mando's mudhorn Signet. The pre-orders for the soundtrack started on June 26, and finally released on December 15.

The Mandalorian: Chapter 1 (Original Score)
No.	Title	Length
1.	"Hey Mando!"	2:13
2.	"Face to Face"	5:13
3.	"Back for Beskar"	2:25
4.	"HammerTime"	2:17
5.	"Blurg Attack"	1:25
6.	"You Are a Mandalorian"	3:55
7.	"Bounty Droid"	3:02
8.	"The Asset"	1:35
9.	"The Mandalorian"	3:18
Total length:		25:23

== Reception ==
=== Critical response ===
"Chapter 1: The Mandalorian" received generally positive reviews. On Rotten Tomatoes, the episode has an approval rating of 90% based on reviews from 81 critics, with an average rating of 7.8/10. The website's critics consensus states, "Though its character building leaves something to be desired, "Chapter 1" is a visual feast with enough sense of adventure to inspire hope that the force may be strong with The Mandalorian".

Alan Sepinwall of Rolling Stone praised the episode for introducing the Star Wars franchise considering it to be entertaining and fun, and recognized that Favreau and Filoni can do an effective job by introducing the audience "to this corner of the franchise" and the titular character. Caroline Framke of Variety felt less concerned about capturing the magic of Star Wars and believed that even with the show having lags, "its swerve from a more expected route makes it more intriguing as an entryway into a galaxy far, far away". Brian Tallerico of RogerEbert.com said the premiere was "too hyper by several notches" and considered the flashback sequence to be cringed, but acknowledged Favreau's efforts on the series and manages to keep the viewer hooked for the series. Keith Phipps of Vulture believed that the use of easter eggs was fun, but considers that "others versed in the deepest corners of Star Wars lore will doubtlessly do a better job". Nevertheless, he praised the episode for surrounding the main serious character with the humorous supporting ones by calling it a smart choice. Melanie McFarland of Salon considered that the episode manages to get "the outer reaches of civilization lends more of a spaghetti-Western-meets-ronin-samurai vibe to the narrative" and that it promises an intriguing and sustainable longterm for the series.

Laura Prudom writing for IGN, considered that the episode managed to bring back the Star Wars essence which she initially believed to be impossible to do with "its limitless possibilities, its spirit of adventure, its ability to be both relatably grounded and utterly fantastical all at once". She also praised Pascal's performance by calling it to be "surprisingly expressive", leading Prudom to rate the episode an 8.5 out of 10. Lorraine Ali of the Los Angeles Times described the episode as "a safe, entertaining blockbuster" packed with action, predictable and entertaining. Paul Bradshaw of NME considered the episode "sparse enough to feel bigger than it is, slick without looking over-polished, and introducing a moody, mumbly antihero that is somehow already worth caring about" but that it marks to be a great start for a show. Emily St. James of Vox Media had a more lukewarm reception, stating that the blend of Star Wars, Spaghetti Westerns, and prestige TV was fine but that Disney+ would be wanting to do more than that. St. James additionally described the first five minutes as "stretched out".

=== Accolades ===
Award	Year	Category	Recipient(s)	Result	Ref(s)
Motion Picture Sound Editors Awards	January 19, 2020	Outstanding Achievement in Sound Editing – Episodic Short Form – Dialogue/ADR	Matthew Wood, David Acord, Steve Slanec, James Spencer, and Richard Quinn	Nominated	
Motion Picture Sound Editors Awards	January 19, 2020	Outstanding Achievement in Sound Editing – Episodic Short Form – Effects/Foley	David Acord, Matthew Wood, Bonnie Wild, Jon Borland, Chris Frazier, Pascal Garneau, Steve Slanec, Richard Gould, Ronni Brown, and Jana Vance	Won	
Art Directors Guild Awards	February 1, 2020	Excellence in Production Design for a One-Hour Period or Fantasy Single-Camera Series	Andrew L. Jones	Nominated	
Primetime Creative Arts Emmy Awards	September 14–17 & 19, 2020	Outstanding Production Design for a Narrative Program (Half-Hour or Less)	Andrew L. Jones, Jeff Wisniewski, Amanda Serino	Won	
Primetime Creative Arts Emmy Awards	September 14–17 & 19, 2020	Outstanding Sound Editing for a Comedy or Drama Series (Half-Hour) and Animation	David Acord, Matthew Wood, Bonnie Wild, James Spencer, Richard Quinn, Richard Gould, Stephanie McNally, Ryan Rubin, Ronni Brown, and Jana Vance	Won	
American Society of Cinematographers Awards	April 18, 2021	Outstanding Achievement in Cinematography in an Episode of a Half-Hour Television Series	Greig Fraser	Nominated	
