= Rio Hackford =

American film and television actor (1970–2022)

- Born: Rio Del Valle Hackford; June 28, 1970; Los Angeles County, California, U.S.
- Died: April 14, 2022 (aged 51); Huntington Beach, California, U.S.
- Occupations: Film and television actor
- Years active: 1990–2022
- Spouse: Libby Grace
- Children: 2
- Parent(s): Taylor Hackford (father); Lynne Littman (stepmother); Helen Mirren (stepmother)

Rio Del Valle Hackford (June 28, 1970 – April 14, 2022) was an American film and television actor. He was best known for playing the recurring role of Toby in the American drama television series Treme.

== Life and career ==
Hackford was born in Los Angeles County, California, the son of film director Taylor Hackford. He began his career in 1990, first appearing in the film Pretty Woman, where he played the uncredited role of a street junkie. Hackford appeared in films such as Safe, Exit to Eden, Déjà Vu, I Love Your Work, Blood In Blood Out, Treasure Island, Sherrybaby and Strange Days. He played the role of Detective King in the 2006 film Stay Alive. Hackford also played the role of Grayden Nash in the 2010 film Jonah Hex.

In his television career, Hackford guest-starred in series including When Nature Calls with Helen Mirren, American Crime Story, Togetherness, Memphis Beat, Underground and True Detective. He played the recurring role of Toby in the drama television series Treme. Hackford was also the on-set physical portrayer of IG-11 in the television series The Mandalorian, the character being voiced by Taika Waititi. His last credit was from the biographical drama miniseries Pam & Tommy, in which he played the role of a manager.

Hackford owned the clubs: El Dorado in Hollywood, the Homestead in San Francisco, and in New Orleans including One-Eyed Jacks, El Matador, and Pal's Lounge.

== Death ==
Hackford died in April 2022 of uveal melanoma in Sunset Beach, California, at the age of 51.
