= Chapter 3: The Sin =

- The Mandalorian episode
- Promotional poster
- Episode no.: Season 1 Episode 3
- Directed by: Deborah Chow
- Written by: Jon Favreau
- Cinematography by: Greig Fraser
- Editing by: Jeff Seibenick
- Original release date: November 22, 2019
- Running time: 34 minutes

Co-starring
- Werner Herzog as The Client; Omid Abtahi as Dr. Pershing; Emily Swallow as the Armorer; Carl Weathers as Greef Karga

Episode chronology
← Previous "Chapter 2: The Child"	Next → "Chapter 4: Sanctuary"
- The Mandalorian season 1

"Chapter 3: The Sin" is the third episode of the first season of the American streaming television series The Mandalorian. It was written by the series' showrunner Jon Favreau and directed by Deborah Chow. The episode takes place in the Star Wars universe five years after the events of Return of the Jedi (1983). In the episode, the Mandalorian successfully delivers the Child to the Client. However, the Mandalorian feeling guilty of handing over the Child decides to rescue the latter. This causes the two to become fugitives from the Guild, forcing them to leave Nevarro and go into hiding.

It stars Pedro Pascal as the Mandalorian, while the Child is created through animatronics and puppetry augmented with visual effects. The episode also features co-stars Carl Weathers, Werner Herzog, Omid Abtahi, and Emily Swallow. Favreau was hired to be the showrunner of the series in March 2018, while Chow joined the series to direct two episodes for the season in October. Favreau also serves as the executive producer of the series alongside Dave Filoni, Kathleen Kennedy and Colin Wilson.

"Chapter 3: The Sin" was released on the streaming service Disney+ on November 22, 2019. The episode received critical acclaim, with praise towards the action sequences, cinematography, and emotional weight. It received a Primetime Emmy Award nomination.

== Plot ==
The Mandalorian delivers "the Child" to the Client. He asks about the plans for the Child but is given no answer. When the Mandalorian returns to the secret Mandalorian enclave, his heavily damaged armor is replaced by the Armorer with a new set forged from some of the beskar reward. Another Mandalorian berates him for working with former agents of the Galactic Empire, who are responsible for their predicament; the Armorer defuses the situation by reminding them of the Way of Mandalore. Returning to the guild, the Mandalorian learns from Greef Karga that everyone in the guild had a tracking fob for the Child. Greef implores him to take some time to rest, but the Mandalorian insists on taking on another job. He asks Greef if he has any idea what the Client has planned for the Child, but Greef says he did not ask as it would be against the guild code, telling him he should forget about it. Despite accepting a new assignment and starting to prepare his ship to depart, the Mandalorian feels guilty about delivering the Child and turns back to infiltrate the Client's base of operations.

Killing many Imperial stormtroopers, he rescues the Child from a laboratory. On the way back to his ship, the Mandalorian is ambushed by the other bounty hunters and Greef, who demand he hand over the Child. After he refuses, a firefight breaks out, leaving the Mandalorian heavily outnumbered and cornered, but warriors from the Mandalorian enclave unexpectedly arrive, attacking the bounty hunters and giving the Mandalorian cover to escape. Ambushing the Mandalorian on his ship, Greef gives him one last chance to surrender, but the Mandalorian outsmarts him and shoots him, ejecting him from the spacecraft. The Child's hand appears, reaching up to the console from below; the Mandalorian unscrews a control knob that he had earlier forbidden the Child to play with and drops it into its hand.

== Production ==
=== Development ===
Lucasfilm and Disney announced the development of a new live action Star Wars series that would be released for their streaming service Disney+ in November 2017. The series would be focused on the Mandalorians exploring the "scum and villainy" of the Star Wars universe taking place five years after the events of the film Return of the Jedi (1983). The series would later reveal its official title The Mandalorian alongside the official premise. Lucasfilm president Kathleen Kennedy saw the opportunity of the series to allow a diverse group of writers and directors to create their own Star Wars stories. In March 2018, Jon Favreau was hired by Lucasfilm to be the head writer of the series, while Deborah Chow was announced to direct two episodes for the series by October. Chow is the first woman to direct a live-action project for the Star Wars franchise. The executive producers of the series include Kennedy, Favreau, Dave Filoni and Colin Wilson. The first season's third episode titled "Chapter 3: The Sin", was written by Favreau, and was released on Disney+ on November 22, 2019.

=== Writing ===
The comic book manga Lone Wolf and Cub was influential for the development of the series, as the relationship grows stronger as it progress. Filoni revealed that the idea of the development of both of the lead characters was an idea of Favreau to inspire the manga for the creation of the series "some of his mystique had been taken away due to the prequel trilogy". Favreau idea was to reimagine that character as a straight-on bounty hunter and take that imagery of the lone gunfighter. The revelation was this idea of this child in a lone wolf cub sensibility." Seeking a redemption arc for the main character, Favreau wrote the episode's story to follow the Mandalorian trying to initially avoid the responsibility of taking the Child, not wanting to take the responsibility of a father by delivering the Child to the Client. However, the Mandalorian regrets his actions and decides to save him, representing the main character arc of redemption to become softer and relatable, leading him to become the prey for the assassins from the organization that he used to work. Favreau was influenced by the John Wick film series to create the storyline, as the titular character also breaks the rules of the organization that he worked for, thus becoming an "excomunicado" and the prey of the assassins who seek the reward forcing him to go on the run.

=== Casting ===
On December 12, 2018, it was announced that Werner Herzog, Omid Abtahi, and Carl Weathers had joined the main cast as The Client, Dr. Pershing and Greef Karga, respectively. Emily Swallow guest stars as The Armorer. Paz Vizla was voiced by Favreau and physically played by stunt double Tait Fletcher. Gene Freeman is credited as stunt double for Greef Karga. "The Child" was performed by various puppeteers.

=== Filming and visual effects ===
Principal photography began in the first week of October 2018 in Southern California. Filming took place at the Manhattan Beach Studios in California under the working title Project Huckleberry, while also receiving a limited location filming in the area of Los Angeles. The series applies the StageCraft which was created with the intention of capturing the digital environments rendered on a video wall in real time in order to bring high quality images for the to final effects. Greig Fraser was the sole director of photography for the first and third episodes, which were filmed together at the same time. Filming for the first season wrapped on February 27, 2019. Visual effects for the episode were created by Industrial Light & Magic (ILM), Base FX, ImagineEngine, MPC, Pixomondo, El Ranchito, Ghost FX, Hybride FX, and Important Looking Pirates. The development of the visual effects was supervised by Richard Bluff.

=== Music ===
A soundtrack album for the episode was released by digitally by Walt Disney Records on November 22, 2019, featuring Ludwig Göransson's score. On August 24, 2020, it was announced that Mondo would be releasing a limited edition for the complete score of the first season on vinyl edition, consisting of 8-CD discs for each episode with each one set pressed with a 180 Gram vinyl disc housed in it own jacked that features artwork by Paul Mann, while the box set is adorned with Mando's mudhorn Signet. The pre-orders for the soundtrack started on June 26, and finally released on December 15.

The Mandalorian: Chapter 3 (Original Score)
No.	Title	Length
1.	"A New Day"	5:30
2.	"Mandalore Way"	3:21
3.	"Signet Forging"	2:02
4.	"Second Thoughts"	4:19
5.	"Whistling Bird"	2:22
6.	"Mando Rescue"	2:14
7.	"I Need One of Those"	1:34
Total length:		21:22

== Reception ==
=== Critical response ===
"Chapter 3: The Sin" received critical acclaim. On Rotten Tomatoes, the episode holds an approval rating of 94% with an average rating of 8.3/10, based on 33 reviews. The website's critics consensus reads, "Director Deborah Chow brings the action in 'The Sin', an effective and exciting installment that pushes deeper into The Mandalorian's story."

In a positive review, Tyler Hersko, of IndieWire, stated that "[It] has done an admirable job of establishing its premise and most of its main characters in its first three episodes, but it remains to be seen if the rest of the season can move those elements in an interesting (and hopefully inventive) direction." Kelly Lawler of USA Today wrote: "Three episodes into the series set in a galaxy far, far away, Baby Yoda has emerged as the shining star of Mandalorian, the standout character who keeps fans coming back for more as the uneven series chugs on." Katie Rife of The A.V. Club gave the episode a grade B+, and praised Göransson's score, saying it sounds like Ennio Morricone's themes played by robots, "perfect for the show's tone". Ben Lindbergh for his review from The Ringer praised the fact that the main character has changed sides, "making The Mandalorian better by selling its protagonist's faceless face turn", and recognized that Baby Yoda was cute.

Bryan Young, who writes for /Film, considers that the episode makes a "great entry into the story, advancing the mythology and setting up a major conflict of the rest of the series", though he thought that the episode was repetitive from the elements of the first episode. In writing about the episode for Nerdist, Kyle Anderson praised the final battle of the Mandalorian, saying there was "something majestic about seeing Mandalorian warriors", and hoped that he could see more of them in the upcoming seasons. Giving it a rating of 8.7 out of 10, David Griffin commented for IGN that the series may not be the "most loquacious guy in the parsec", but admitted that Favreau managed to do great job with the writing and also praised Pascal's performance as the Mandalorian. He highlighted the character showing his human side in the episode and revealing that he wasn't a cold-hearted character after all.

=== Accolades ===
Award	Date of ceremony	Category	Recipient(s)	Result	Ref(s)
Visual Effects Society Awards	January 7, 2020	Outstanding Model in a Photoreal or Animated Project	Doug Chiang, Jay Machado, John Goodson and Landis Fields IV	Won	
Primetime Creative Arts Emmy Awards	September 14–17 & 19, 2020	Outstanding Fantasy/Sci-Fi Costumes	Joseph Porro, Julie Robar, Gigi Melton, and Lauren Silvestri	Nominated	
