= Deborah Chow =

Canadian film director

- Born: Toronto, Ontario, Canada
- Education: McGill University (BA); Columbia University (MFA)
- Occupations: Filmmaker, television director, screenwriter
- Known for: The High Cost of Living; The Mandalorian; Obi-Wan Kenobi

Deborah Chow is a Canadian filmmaker, television director and screenwriter known for her independent films and her work on Star Wars television. Two of her first short films, Daypass (2002) and The Hill (2004) have both won awards at various international film festivals. Her first feature film was The High Cost of Living (2010), which she both wrote and directed.

Chow has directed various projects for television, including the 2014 TV movie adaption of V. C. Andrews' Gothic novel Flowers in the Attic and episodes of the series Copper, Murdoch Mysteries, Reign, Beauty and the Beast, and Mr. Robot. Chow is also a director on the first season of the Star Wars series The Mandalorian (2019) and directed all six episodes of Obi-Wan Kenobi (2022) for Disney+.

== Early life ==
Chow is the half-Chinese daughter of parents who emigrated from Australia to Toronto, Ontario, Canada, where she grew up.

Her Chinese father was an ardent movie fan and introduced to her the world of classic films and filmmaking. Chow graduated from Gordon Graydon Memorial Secondary School in Mississauga, Ontario.

She received her undergraduate degree, major of cultural theory and minor in art history, from McGill University in Montreal, where she made her first short film. After graduation, she went on to complete her MFA in directing at Columbia University's School of the Arts, where she completed two short films and a feature screenplay, including her short film, Daypass, which screened internationally at over 35 festivals and won multiple awards.

== Career ==
Chow began her career writing and directing short films while studying film at university and broke out with her first feature film, The High Cost of Living, in 2010. As a film director, she has worked with notable actors James Urbaniak, Zach Braff and Isabelle Blais, among others.

As a television director, she has worked on the BBC show Copper, the CW programs Reign and Beauty and the Beast, the CBC show Murdoch Mysteries and the USA Network series Mr. Robot. She also directed the adaptation of Flowers in the Attic on Lifetime, which starred Heather Graham and Kiernan Shipka.

Chow served as director of two episodes of the Disney+ exclusive streaming television series, Star Wars: The Mandalorian, in which she also had a cameo role as a New Republic X-wing pilot. She was announced as the sole director for the Disney+ series that centers on Obi-Wan Kenobi. Lucasfilm President Kathleen Kennedy stated that "We really wanted to select a director who is able to explore both the quiet determination and rich mystique of Obi-Wan in a way that folds seamlessly into the Star Wars saga. Based on her phenomenal work developing our characters in The Mandalorian, I'm absolutely confident Deborah is the right director to tell this story."

Chow directed the music video for "Black Summer", the first single off of the Red Hot Chili Peppers 2022 album, Unlimited Love.

== Filmography ==
=== Film ===
Year	Title	Credited as		Notes
Year	Title	Director	Writer	Notes
2002	Daypass	Yes	Yes	Short film
2004	The Hill	Yes	Yes	Also editor and costume designer
2010	The High Cost of Living	Yes	Yes	
2014	Flowers in the Attic	Yes	No	
2026	The Mandalorian and Grogu	No	No	Role: Sash Ketter

=== Television ===
Year	Show	Season	Episode	Episode title
2013	Copper	2	8	"Ashes Denote That Fire Was"
2014–2017	Reign	2	7	"The Prince of the Blood"
2014–2017	Reign	2	13	"Sins of the Past"
2014–2017	Reign	2	19	"Abandoned"
2014–2017	Reign	3	5	"In a Clearing"
2014–2017	Reign	3	18	"Spiders in a Jar"
2014–2017	Reign	4	11	"Dead of Night"
2014	Murdoch Mysteries	8	6	"The Murdoch Appreciation Society"
2014	Murdoch Mysteries	8	7	"What Lies Buried"
2015	Beauty & the Beast	3	7	"Both Sides Now"
2015	Mr. Robot	1	6	"eps1.5 br4ve-trave1er.asf"
2016	Turn: Washington's Spies	3	4	"Hearts and Minds"
2016	The Vampire Diaries	7	10	"Hell Is Other People"
2016–2017	Fear the Walking Dead	2	9	"Los Muertos"
2016–2017	Fear the Walking Dead	3	3	"TEOTWAWKI"
2016	Tyrant	3	5	"A Rock and A Hard Place"
2017	Iron Fist	1	11	"Lead Horse Back to Stable"
2017	Shut Eye	2	9	"Vérité"
2018	Jessica Jones	2	4	"AKA God Help the Hobo"
2018	Lost in Space	1	5	"Transmission"
2018	Snowfall	2	4	"Jingle Bell Rock"
2018	Better Call Saul	4	7	"Something Stupid"
2018	The Man in the High Castle	3	9	"Baku"
2019	American Gods	2	3	"Muninn"
2019	The Mandalorian	1	3	"Chapter 3: The Sin"
2019	The Mandalorian	1	7	"Chapter 7: The Reckoning"
2022	Obi-Wan Kenobi	1	1	"Part I"
2022	Obi-Wan Kenobi	1	2	"Part II"
2022	Obi-Wan Kenobi	1	3	"Part III"
2022	Obi-Wan Kenobi	1	4	"Part IV"
2022	Obi-Wan Kenobi	1	5	"Part V"
2022	Obi-Wan Kenobi	1	6	"Part VI"

=== Music videos ===
Year	Artist(s)	Title	Notes
2022	Red Hot Chili Peppers	"Black Summer"	Music video for their single from Unlimited Love

=== Acting credits ===
Year	Title	Episode(s)	Role	Notes	Ref.
2019	The Mandalorian	"Chapter 6: The Prisoner"	Sash Ketter	Cameo	
2023	The Mandalorian	"Chapter 21: The Pirate"	Sash Ketter	Cameo	
2023	The Mandalorian	"Chapter 24: The Return"	Sash Ketter	Cameo	
2026	The Mandalorian and Grogu	—N/a	Sash Ketter	Cameo	

== Awards and recognition ==
Her short film, Daypass, won the Best Actor Award at the Milano Film Festival and the Best Short at the Turin Film Festival. The feature-length screenplay version of the film won the Comedy Central Award for Best Comedy Screenplay. Chow was the winner of the 2005 Kodak New Vision Mentorship award for her short film The Hill, the winnings from which included funding for her first feature film. She was a participant in the Berlinale Talent Campus, Toronto International Film Festival Talent Lab, and the Praxis Screenwriting Lab. Her debut feature film The High Cost of Living won Best First Feature and Top Ten at the Toronto International Film Festival, Best Canadian Feature at the Female Eye Film Fest, and Prix Super-Écran at the Rendez-vous du cinéma québécois. She received the Andrew Sarris Award at the 2022 Columbia University Film Festival.
