= List of accolades received by The Mandalorian =

Awards and nominations
| Award | Wins | Nominations |
| American Cinema Editors Awards | 0 | 1 |
| American Film Institute Awards | 1 | 1 |
| American Society of Cinematographers Awards | 1 | 3 |
| Annie Awards | 1 | 1 |
| Art Directors Guild Awards | 1 | 2 |
| Black Reel Awards | 0 | 6 |
| British Academy Television Awards | 0 | 1 |
| Casting Society of America | 0 | 1 |
| Cinema Audio Society Awards | 1 | 2 |
| Costume Designers Guild Awards | 0 | 1 |
| Critics' Choice Super Awards | 1 | 2 |
| Critics' Choice Television Awards | 0 | 1 |
| Directors Guild of America Awards | 0 | 1 |
| Dorian Awards | 0 | 2 |
| Dragon Awards | 1 | 1 |
| Golden Globe Awards | 0 | 1 |
| Golden Trailer Awards | 0 | 3 |
| Grammy Awards | 0 | 1 |
| Hollywood Critics Association Creative Arts TV Awards | 0 | 4 |
| Hollywood Critics Association TV Awards | 1 | 7 |
| Hugo Awards | 0 | 3 |
| ICG Publicists Awards | 1 | 1 |
| Make-Up Artists and Hair Stylists Guild Awards | 1 | 2 |
| Motion Picture Sound Editors Awards | 3 | 4 |
| MTV Movie & TV Awards | 0 | 3 |
| Nebula Awards | 0 | 2 |
| Primetime Creative Arts Emmy Awards | 14 | 42 |
| Primetime Emmy Awards | 0 | 6 |
| Producers Guild of America Awards | 0 | 1 |
| Satellite Awards | 0 | 1 |
| Saturn Awards | 1 | 7 |
| Screen Actors Guild Awards | 1 | 1 |
| TCA Awards | 0 | 2 |
| Visual Effects Society Awards | 5 | 19 |
| Writers Guild of America Awards | 0 | 1 |

Totals (Note: Certain award groups do not simply award one winner. They acknowledge several different recipients, have runners-up, and have third place. Since this is a specific recognition and is different from losing an award, runner-up mentions are considered wins in this award tally. For simplification and to avoid errors, each award in this list has been presumed to have had a prior nomination.)
- Wins: 34
- Nominations: 137

The Mandalorian is an American space Western television series created by Jon Favreau for the streaming service Disney+. It is the first live-action series in the Star Wars franchise, beginning five years after the events of Return of the Jedi (1983). Pedro Pascal stars as the title character, a lone bounty hunter who goes on the run after being hired to retrieve "The Child". The first season premiered on Disney+ on its United States launch day, November 12, 2019, and the second season premiered on October 30, 2020.

The series received numerous awards and nominations for its acting, directing, writing, visual effects, and production values. Among these recognitions, it has been nominated for six Primetime Emmy Awards and forty-two Primetime Creative Arts Emmy Awards (winning fourteen Creative Arts Emmys). The series' first two seasons were nominated for Outstanding Drama Series. At the 2021 ceremony, it tied for most nominations with twenty-four, and it tied for most awards at the Creative Arts ceremony in 2020 with seven wins. Giancarlo Esposito, Timothy Olyphant, Taika Waititi, and Carl Weathers have received Emmy nominations for their performances. Episodes "Chapter 1: The Mandalorian", "Chapter 2: The Child", and "Chapter 16: The Rescue" each won two Emmy awards for their technical achievements.

The Mandalorian has also been nominated for one British Academy Television Award, one Critics' Choice Television Award, one Directors Guild of America Award, one Golden Globe Award, one Grammy Award, three Hugo Awards, three MTV Movie & TV Awards, one Producers Guild of America Award, one ICG Publicists Award (won), one Satellite Award, seven Saturn Awards, two TCA Awards, nineteen Visual Effects Society Awards (winning five), and one Writers Guild of America Award, among others. The series was selected by the American Film Institute as one of its top 10 television programs of the year in 2020.

== Accolades ==
Accolades received by The Mandalorian
| Award | Year (Note: Indicates the year of ceremony) | Category | Recipients | Result | Ref. |
|---|---|---|---|---|---|
| AACTA International Awards | 2021 | Best Drama Series | The Mandalorian | Nominated | |
| American Cinema Editors Awards | 2021 | Best Edited Drama Series for Non-Commercial Television | Dana E. Glauberman (for "Chapter 4: Sanctuary") | Nominated | |
| American Film Institute Awards | 2021 | Top 10 TV Programs of the Year | The Mandalorian | Won | |
| American Society of Cinematographers Awards | 2021 | Outstanding Achievement in Cinematography in an Episode of a Half-Hour Television Series | Greig Fraser (for "Chapter 1: The Mandalorian") | Nominated | |
| American Society of Cinematographers Awards | 2021 | Outstanding Achievement in Cinematography in an Episode of a Half-Hour Television Series | Baz Idoine (for "Chapter 13: The Jedi") | Won | |
| American Society of Cinematographers Awards | 2021 | Outstanding Achievement in Cinematography in an Episode of a Half-Hour Television Series | Matthew Jensen (for "Chapter 15: The Believer") | Nominated | |
| Annie Awards | 2021 | Best Character Animation - Live Action | Nathan Fitzgerald, Leo Ito, Chris Rogers, Eung Ho Lo, Emily Luk | Won | |
| Art Directors Guild Awards | 2020 | Excellence in Production Design for a One-Hour Period or Fantasy Single-Camera Series | Andrew L. Jones (for "Chapter 1: The Mandalorian") | Nominated | |
| Art Directors Guild Awards | 2021 | Excellence in Production Design for a One-Hour Period or Fantasy Single-Camera Series | Andrew L. Jones and Doug Chiang (for "Chapter 13: The Jedi") | Won | |
| Black Reel Awards | 2021 | Outstanding Supporting Actor, Drama Series | Giancarlo Esposito | Nominated | |
| Black Reel Awards | 2021 | Outstanding Guest Actor, Drama Series | Carl Lumbly | Nominated | |
| Black Reel Awards | 2021 | Outstanding Guest Actress, Drama Series | Rosario Dawson | Nominated | |
| Black Reel Awards | 2021 | Outstanding Directing, Drama Series | Rick Famuyiwa (for "Chapter 15: The Believer") | Nominated | |
| Black Reel Awards | 2021 | Outstanding Writing, Drama Series | Rick Famuyiwa (for "Chapter 15: The Believer") | Nominated | |
| Black Reel Awards | 2023 | Outstanding Guest Actor, Drama Series | Giancarlo Esposito | Nominated | |
| British Academy Television Awards | 2021 | Virgin TV's Must-See Moment | "Luke Skywalker appears" | Nominated | |
| Casting Society of America | 2021 | Television Pilot and First Season – Drama | Sarah Finn, Jason B. Stamey | Nominated | |
| Cinema Audio Society Awards | 2021 | Outstanding Achievement in Sound Mixing for Television Series – 1/2 Hour | Shawn Holden, Bonnie Wild, Stephen Urata, Christopher Fogel, Matthew Wood, and Blake Collins (for "Chapter 2: The Child") | Won | |
| Cinema Audio Society Awards | 2021 | Outstanding Achievement in Sound Mixing for Television Series – 1/2 Hour | Shawn Holden, Bonnie Wild, Stephen Urata, Christopher Fogel, Matthew Wood, and Jason Butler (for "Chapter 13: The Jedi") | Nominated | |
| Costume Designers Guild Awards | 2021 | Excellence in Sci-Fi/Fantasy Television | Shawna Trpcic (for "Chapter 13: The Jedi") | Nominated | |
| Critics' Choice Super Awards | 2021 | Best Science Fiction/Fantasy Series | The Mandalorian | Won | |
| Critics' Choice Super Awards | 2021 | Best Actor in a Science Fiction/Fantasy Series | Pedro Pascal | Nominated | |
| Critics' Choice Television Awards | 2021 | Best Drama Series | The Mandalorian | Nominated | |
| Directors Guild of America Awards | 2021 | Outstanding Directorial Achievement in Dramatic Series | Jon Favreau (for "Chapter 9: The Marshal") | Nominated | |
| Dorian Awards | 2020 | Most Visually Striking Show | The Mandalorian | Nominated | |
| Dorian Awards | 2021 | Most Visually Striking Show | The Mandalorian | Nominated | |
| Dragon Awards | 2020 | Best Science Fiction or Fantasy TV Series | Jon Favreau | Won | |
| Golden Globe Awards | 2021 | Best Television Series – Drama | The Mandalorian | Nominated | |
| Golden Trailer Awards | 2021 | Best Action for a TV/Streaming Series (Trailer/Teaser/TV Spot) | "Waiting" (Buddha Jones) | Nominated | |
| Golden Trailer Awards | 2021 | Best Fantasy Adventure for a TV/Streaming Series (Trailer/Teaser/TV Spot) | "The Way" (The Hive) | Nominated | |
| Golden Trailer Awards | 2021 | Best Wildposts for a TV/Streaming Series | The Mandalorian (Lindeman Associates) | Nominated | |
| Golden Trailer Awards | 2023 | Best Original Score for a TV/Streaming Series (Trailer/Teaser/TV Spot) | "Stronger" (AV Squad) | Won | |
| Grammy Awards | 2022 | Best Score Soundtrack for Visual Media | Ludwig Göransson (for Chapters 13–16) | Nominated | |
| Hollywood Critics Association Creative Arts TV Awards | 2023 | Best Guest Actor in a Drama Series | Giancarlo Esposito | Nominated | |
| Hollywood Critics Association Creative Arts TV Awards | 2023 | Best Guest Actress in a Drama Series | Lizzo | Nominated | |
| Hollywood Critics Association Creative Arts TV Awards | 2023 | Best Fantasy or Science Fiction Costumes | The Mandalorian | Nominated | |
| Hollywood Critics Association Creative Arts TV Awards | 2023 | Best Stunts | The Mandalorian | Nominated | |
| Hollywood Critics Association TV Awards | 2021 | Best Streaming Series, Drama | The Mandalorian | Won | |
| Hollywood Critics Association TV Awards | 2021 | Best Actor in a Streaming Series, Drama | Pedro Pascal | Nominated | |
| Hollywood Critics Association TV Awards | 2021 | Best Supporting Actor in a Streaming Series, Drama | Giancarlo Esposito | Nominated | |
| Hollywood Critics Association TV Awards | 2021 | Best Supporting Actress in a Streaming Series, Drama | Ming-Na Wen | Nominated | |
| Hollywood Critics Association TV Awards | 2023 | Best Streaming Series, Drama | The Mandalorian | Nominated | |
| Hollywood Critics Association TV Awards | 2023 | Best Supporting Actress in a Streaming Series, Drama | Emily Swallow | Nominated | |
| Hollywood Critics Association TV Awards | 2023 | Best Directing in a Streaming Series, Drama | Lee Isaac Chung (for "Chapter 19: The Convert") | Nominated | |
| Hugo Awards | 2020 | Best Dramatic Presentation – Short Form | Jon Favreau and Taika Waititi (for "Chapter 8: Redemption") | Nominated | |
| Hugo Awards | 2021 | Best Dramatic Presentation, Short Form | Jon Favreau (writer), Peyton Reed (director) (for "Chapter 16: The Rescue") | Nominated | |
| Hugo Awards | 2021 | Best Dramatic Presentation, Short Form | Dave Filoni (writer/director) (for "Chapter 13: The Jedi") | Nominated | |
| ICG Publicists Awards | 2020 | Maxwell Weinberg Publicist Showmanship Television Award | Disney+ for The Mandalorian | Won | |
| Make-Up Artists and Hair Stylists Guild Awards | 2021 | Best Period and/or Character Make-Up for a Television Series, Television Limited or Miniseries or Television New Media Series | Brian Sipe, Alexei Dmitriew, Samantha Ward and Carlton Coleman | Nominated | |
| Make-Up Artists and Hair Stylists Guild Awards | 2021 | Best Special Make-Up Effects for a Television Series, Television Limited or Miniseries or Television New Media Series | Brian Sipe, Alexei Dmitriew, Samantha Ward, and Scott Stoddard | Won | |
| Motion Picture Sound Editors Awards | 2020 | Outstanding Achievement in Sound Editing – Episodic Short Form – Dialogue/ADR | Matthew Wood, David Acord, Steve Slanec, James Spencer, and Richard Quinn (for "Chapter 1: The Mandalorian") | Nominated | |
| Motion Picture Sound Editors Awards | 2020 | Outstanding Achievement in Sound Editing – Episodic Short Form – Effects/Foley | David Acord, Matthew Wood, Bonnie Wild, Jon Borland, Chris Frazier, Pascal Garneau, Steve Slanec, Richard Gould, Ronni Brown, and Jana Vance (for "Chapter 1: The Mandalorian") | Won | |
| Motion Picture Sound Editors Awards | 2021 | Outstanding Achievement in Sound Editing – Episodic Short Form – Dialogue/ADR | Matthew Wood, David Acord, Richard Quinn, and James Spencer (for "Chapter 13: The Jedi") | Won | |
| Motion Picture Sound Editors Awards | 2021 | Outstanding Achievement in Sound Editing – Episodic Short Form – Effects/Foley | David Acord, Matthew Wood, Benjamin A. Burtt, J.R. Grubbs, Richard Gould, Ronni Brown, and Jana Vance (for "Chapter 13: The Jedi") | Won | |
| MTV Movie & TV Awards | 2021 | Best Hero | Pedro Pascal | Nominated | |
| MTV Movie & TV Awards | 2021 | Best Villain | Giancarlo Esposito | Nominated | |
| MTV Movie & TV Awards | 2021 | Best Duo | Din Djarin and Grogu | Nominated | |
| Nebula Awards | 2020 | Ray Bradbury Award for Outstanding Dramatic Presentation | Jon Favreau (for "Chapter 2: The Child") | Nominated | |
| Nebula Awards | 2021 | Ray Bradbury Award for Outstanding Dramatic Presentation | Jon Favreau (for "Chapter 14: The Tragedy") | Nominated | |
| Nickelodeon's Kids' Choice Awards | 2021 | Favorite Family TV Show | The Mandalorian | Nominated | |
| Primetime Creative Arts Emmy Awards | 2020 | Outstanding Character Voice-Over Performance | Taika Waititi as IG-11 (for "Chapter 8: Redemption") | Nominated | |
| Primetime Creative Arts Emmy Awards | 2020 | Outstanding Cinematography for a Single-Camera Series (Half-Hour) | Greig Fraser and Baz Idoine (for "Chapter 7: The Reckoning") | Won | |
| Primetime Creative Arts Emmy Awards | 2020 | Outstanding Fantasy/Sci-Fi Costumes | Joseph Porro, Julie Robar, Gigi Melton, and Lauren Silvestri (for "Chapter 3: The Sin") | Nominated | |
| Primetime Creative Arts Emmy Awards | 2020 | Outstanding Guest Actor in a Drama Series | Giancarlo Esposito as Moff Gideon (for "Chapter 8: Redemption") | Nominated | |
| Primetime Creative Arts Emmy Awards | 2020 | Outstanding Music Composition for a Series | Ludwig Göransson (for "Chapter 8: Redemption") | Won | |
| Primetime Creative Arts Emmy Awards | 2020 | Outstanding Production Design for a Narrative Program (Half-Hour or Less) | Andrew L. Jones, Jeff Wisniewski, Amanda Serino (for "Chapter 1: The Mandalorian") | Won | |
| Primetime Creative Arts Emmy Awards | 2020 | Outstanding Prosthetic Makeup for a Series, Limited Series, Movie or Special | Brian Sipe, Alexei Dmitriew, Carlton Coleman, Samantha Ward, Scott Stoddard, Mike Ornelaz, and Sabrina Castro (for "Chapter 6: The Prisoner") | Nominated | |
| Primetime Creative Arts Emmy Awards | 2020 | Outstanding Single-Camera Picture Editing for a Drama Series | Andrew S. Eisen (for "Chapter 2: The Child") | Nominated | |
| Primetime Creative Arts Emmy Awards | 2020 | Outstanding Single-Camera Picture Editing for a Drama Series | Dana E. Glauberman and Dylan Firshein (for "Chapter 4: Sanctuary") | Nominated | |
| Primetime Creative Arts Emmy Awards | 2020 | Outstanding Single-Camera Picture Editing for a Drama Series | Jeff Seibenick (for "Chapter 8: Redemption") | Nominated | |
| Primetime Creative Arts Emmy Awards | 2020 | Outstanding Sound Editing for a Comedy or Drama Series (Half-Hour) and Animation | David Acord, Matthew Wood, Bonnie Wild, James Spencer, Richard Quinn, Richard Gould, Stephanie McNally, Ryan Rubin, Ronni Brown, and Jana Vance (for "Chapter 1: The Mandalorian") | Won | |
| Primetime Creative Arts Emmy Awards | 2020 | Outstanding Sound Mixing for a Comedy or Drama Series (Half-Hour) and Animation | Shawn Holden, Bonnie Wild, and Chris Fogel (for "Chapter 2: The Child") | Won | |
| Primetime Creative Arts Emmy Awards | 2020 | Outstanding Special Visual Effects | Richard Bluff, Jason Porter, Abbigail Keller, Hayden Jones, Hal Hickel, Roy Cancino, John Rosengrant, Enrico Damm, and Landis Fields (for "Chapter 2: The Child") | Won | |
| Primetime Creative Arts Emmy Awards | 2020 | Outstanding Stunt Coordination for a Drama Series, Limited Series or Movie | Ryan Watson | Won | |
| Primetime Creative Arts Emmy Awards | 2021 | Outstanding Guest Actor in a Drama Series | Timothy Olyphant (for "Chapter 9: The Marshal") | Nominated | |
| Primetime Creative Arts Emmy Awards | 2021 | Outstanding Guest Actor in a Drama Series | Carl Weathers (for "Chapter 12: The Siege") | Nominated | |
| Primetime Creative Arts Emmy Awards | 2021 | Outstanding Casting for a Drama Series | Sarah Halley Finn | Nominated | |
| Primetime Creative Arts Emmy Awards | 2021 | Outstanding Cinematography for a Single-Camera Series (Half-Hour) | Matthew Jensen (for "Chapter 15: The Believer") | Won | |
| Primetime Creative Arts Emmy Awards | 2021 | Outstanding Cinematography for a Single-Camera Series (One Hour) | Baz Idoine (for "Chapter 13: The Jedi") | Nominated | |
| Primetime Creative Arts Emmy Awards | 2021 | Outstanding Fantasy/Sci-Fi Costumes | Shawna Trpcic, Julie Robar, and Sara Fox (for "Chapter 13: The Jedi") | Nominated | |
| Primetime Creative Arts Emmy Awards | 2021 | Outstanding Period and/or Character Hairstyling | Maria Sandoval, Ashleigh Childers, and Wendy Southard (for "Chapter 16: The Rescue") | Nominated | |
| Primetime Creative Arts Emmy Awards | 2021 | Outstanding Prosthetic Makeup | Brian Sipe, Alexei Dmitriew, Samantha Ward, Scott Stoddard, Pepe Mora, Cale Thomas, Carlton Coleman, and Scott Patton (for "Chapter 13: The Jedi") | Won | |
| Primetime Creative Arts Emmy Awards | 2021 | Outstanding Music Composition for a Series (Original Dramatic Score) | Ludwig Göransson (for "Chapter 16: The Rescue") | Won | |
| Primetime Creative Arts Emmy Awards | 2021 | Outstanding Single-Camera Picture Editing for a Drama Series | Andrew S. Eisen (for "Chapter 13: The Jedi") | Nominated | |
| Primetime Creative Arts Emmy Awards | 2021 | Outstanding Single-Camera Picture Editing for a Drama Series | Dylan Firshen and J. Erik Jessen (for "Chapter 11: The Heiress") | Nominated | |
| Primetime Creative Arts Emmy Awards | 2021 | Outstanding Single-Camera Picture Editing for a Drama Series | Adam Gerstel (for "Chapter 16: The Rescue") | Nominated | |
| Primetime Creative Arts Emmy Awards | 2021 | Outstanding Single-Camera Picture Editing for a Drama Series | Jeff Seibenick (for "Chapter 15: The Believer") | Nominated | |
| Primetime Creative Arts Emmy Awards | 2021 | Outstanding Production Design for a Narrative Period or Fantasy Program (One Hour or More) | Andrew L. Jones, Doug Chiang, David Lazan, and Amanda Serino (for "Chapter 13: The Jedi") | Nominated | |
| Primetime Creative Arts Emmy Awards | 2021 | Outstanding Sound Editing for a Comedy or Drama Series (One-Hour) | Matthew Wood, David Acord, Richard Quinn, James Spencer, Benjamin A. Burtt, J. R. Grubbs, Richard Gould, Stephanie McNally, Ronni Brown, and Jana Vance (for "Chapter 13: The Jedi") | Nominated | |
| Primetime Creative Arts Emmy Awards | 2021 | Outstanding Sound Mixing for a Comedy or Drama Series (One-Hour) | Bonnie Wild, Stephen Urata, Shawn Holden, and Christopher Fogel (for "Chapter 13: The Jedi") | Won | |
| Primetime Creative Arts Emmy Awards | 2021 | Outstanding Special Visual Effects in a Season or a Movie | Joe Bauer, Richard Bluff, Abbigail Keller, Hal Hickel, Roy K. Cancino, John Knoll, Enrico Damm, John Rosengrant, and Joseph Kasparian | Won | |
| Primetime Creative Arts Emmy Awards | 2021 | Outstanding Stunt Coordination | Ryan Watson | Won | |
| Primetime Creative Arts Emmy Awards | 2021 | Outstanding Stunt Performance | Lateef Crowder (for "Chapter 16: The Rescue") | Won | |
| Primetime Creative Arts Emmy Awards | 2023 | Outstanding Cinematography for a Series (Half-Hour) | Dean Cundey (for "Chapter 20: The Foundling") | Nominated | |
| Primetime Creative Arts Emmy Awards | 2023 | Outstanding Fantasy/Sci-Fi Costumes | Shawna Trpcic, Elissa Alcala, Julie Robar, and Julie Yang Silver (for "Chapter 22: Guns for Hire") | Nominated | |
| Primetime Creative Arts Emmy Awards | 2023 | Outstanding Period and/or Character Hairstyling | Maria Sandoval, Ashleigh Childers, and Sallie Ciganovich (for "Chapter 19: The Convert") | Nominated | |
| Primetime Creative Arts Emmy Awards | 2023 | Outstanding Period and/or Character Makeup (Non-Prosthetic) | Cristina Waltz, Ana Gabriela Quinonez Urrego, Alex Perrone, and Crystal Gomez (for "Chapter 22: Guns for Hire") | Nominated | |
| Primetime Creative Arts Emmy Awards | 2023 | Outstanding Sound Editing for a Comedy or Drama Series (Half-Hour) and Animation | Matthew Wood, Trey Turner, Brad Semenoff, David W. Collins, Luis Galdames, Stephanie McNally, Nicholas Fitzgerald, Joel Raabe, and Shelley Roden (for "Chapter 24: The Return") | Nominated | |
| Primetime Creative Arts Emmy Awards | 2023 | Outstanding Sound Mixing for a Comedy or Drama Series (Half-Hour) and Animation | Scott R. Lewis, Tony Villaflor, Shawn Holden, and Chris Fogel (for "Chapter 24: The Return") | Nominated | |
| Primetime Creative Arts Emmy Awards | 2023 | Outstanding Special Visual Effects in a Season or a Movie | Grady Cofer, Abbigail Keller, Paul Kavanagh, Cameron Neilson, Scott Fisher, Hal Hickel, J. Alan Scott, Victor Schutz IV, and Bobo Skipper | Nominated | |
| Primetime Creative Arts Emmy Awards | 2023 | Outstanding Stunt Coordination for a Drama Series, Limited or Anthology Series or Movie | JJ Dashnaw | Nominated | |
| Primetime Creative Arts Emmy Awards | 2023 | Outstanding Stunt Performance | Lateef Crowder, Paul Darnell, JJ Dashnaw, and Ryan Ryusaki (for "Chapter 24: The Return") | Won | |
| Primetime Emmy Awards | 2020 | Outstanding Drama Series | Jon Favreau, Dave Filoni, Kathleen Kennedy, Colin Wilson, and Karen Gilchrist | Nominated | |
| Primetime Emmy Awards | 2021 | Outstanding Drama Series | Jon Favreau, Dave Filoni, Kathleen Kennedy, Colin Wilson, Karen Gilchrist, Carrie Beck, and John Bartnicki | Nominated | |
| Primetime Emmy Awards | 2021 | Outstanding Supporting Actor in a Drama Series | Giancarlo Esposito (for Chapter 16: The Rescue) | Nominated | |
| Primetime Emmy Awards | 2021 | Outstanding Directing for a Drama Series | Jon Favreau (for "Chapter 9: The Marshal") | Nominated | |
| Primetime Emmy Awards | 2021 | Outstanding Writing for a Drama Series | Jon Favreau (for "Chapter 16: The Rescue") | Nominated | |
| Primetime Emmy Awards | 2021 | Outstanding Writing for a Drama Series | Dave Filoni (for "Chapter 13: The Jedi") | Nominated | |
| Producers Guild of America Awards | 2021 | Norman Felton Award for Outstanding Producer of Episodic Television – Drama | Jon Favreau, Dave Filoni, Kathleen Kennedy, Colin Wilson, Karen Gilchrist, John Bartnicki and Carrie Beck | Nominated | |
| Satellite Awards | 2021 | Best Television Series – Genre | The Mandalorian | Nominated | |
| Saturn Awards | 2021 | Best Television Presentation (Under 10 Episodes) | The Mandalorian | Won | |
| Saturn Awards | 2021 | Best Guest Starring Role on Television | Giancarlo Esposito | Nominated | |
| Saturn Awards | 2022 | Best Science Fiction Series (Streaming) | The Mandalorian | Nominated | |
| Saturn Awards | 2022 | Best Guest Performance in a Streaming Series | Rosario Dawson | Nominated | |
| Saturn Awards | 2024 | Best Science Fiction Television Series | The Mandalorian | Nominated | |
| Saturn Awards | 2024 | Best Supporting Actress in a Television Series | Katee Sackhoff | Nominated | |
| Saturn Awards | 2024 | Best Guest Star in a Television Series | Giancarlo Esposito | Nominated | |
| Screen Actors Guild Awards | 2021 | Outstanding Performance by a Stunt Ensemble in a Comedy or Drama Series | The Mandalorian | Won | |
| Screen Actors Guild Awards | 2024 | Outstanding Performance by a Stunt Ensemble in a Comedy or Drama Series | The Mandalorian | Nominated | |
| Set Decorators Society of America Awards | 2021 | Best Achievement in Decor/Design of a One Hour Fantasy or Science Fiction Series | Amanda Serino, Andrew L. Jones and Doug Chiang | Nominated | |
| Society of Camera Operators | 2021 | Camera Operator of the Year – Television | Simon Jayes | Nominated | |
| Society of Composers & Lyricists | 2021 | Outstanding Original Score for Television or Streaming Production | Ludwig Göransson | Nominated | |
| TCA Awards | 2020 | Outstanding New Program | The Mandalorian | Nominated | |
| TCA Awards | 2021 | Outstanding Achievement in Drama | The Mandalorian | Nominated | |
| Visual Effects Society Awards | 2020 | Outstanding Visual Effects in a Photoreal Episode | Richard Bluff, Abbigail Keller, Jason Porter, Hayden Jones and Roy Cancino (for "Chapter 2: The Child") | Won | |
| Visual Effects Society Awards | 2020 | Outstanding Virtual Cinematography in a CG Project | Richard Bluff, Jason Porter, Landis Fields IV and Baz Idione (for "Chapter 6: The Prisoner"; The Roost) | Nominated | |
| Visual Effects Society Awards | 2020 | Outstanding Animated Character in an Episode or Real-Time Project | Terry Bannon, Rudy Massar and Hugo Leygnac (for "Chapter 2: The Child"; Mudhorn) | Nominated | |
| Visual Effects Society Awards | 2020 | Outstanding Model in a Photoreal or Animated Project | Doug Chiang, Jay Machado, John Goodson and Landis Fields IV (for "Chapter 3: The Sin"; The Razorcrest) | Won | |
| Visual Effects Society Awards | 2020 | Outstanding Created Environment in an Episode, Commercial, or Real-Time Project | Alex Murtaza, Yanick Gaudreau, Marco Tremblay and Maryse Bouchard (for Nevarro Town) | Nominated | |
| Visual Effects Society Awards | 2020 | Outstanding Effects Simulations in an Episode, Commercial, or Real-Time Project | Xavier Martin Ramirez, Ian Baxter, Fabio Slino and Andrea Rosa (for "Chapter 2: The Child"; Mudhorn) | Nominated | |
| Visual Effects Society Awards | 2021 | Outstanding Visual Effects in a Photoreal Episode | Joe Bauer, Abbigail Keller, Hal Hickel, Richard Bluff, and Roy Cancino (for "Chapter 9: The Marshal") | Won | |
| Visual Effects Society Awards | 2021 | Outstanding Animated Character in an Episode or Real-Time Project | John Rosengrant, Peter Clarke, Scott Patton, and Hal Hickel (for The Child in "Chapter 13: The Jedi") | Won | |
| Visual Effects Society Awards | 2021 | Outstanding Animated Character in an Episode or Real-Time Project | Paul Kavanagh, Zaini Mohamed Jalani, Michal Kriukow, and Nihal Friedel (for The Krayt Dragon in "Chapter 9: The Marshal") | Nominated | |
| Visual Effects Society Awards | 2021 | Outstanding Created Environment in an Episode, Commercial, or Real-Time Project | Enrico Damm, Johanes Kurnia, Phi Tran, and Tong Tran (for Morak Jungle in "Chapter 15: The Believer") | Won | |
| Visual Effects Society Awards | 2021 | Outstanding Created Environment in an Episode, Commercial, or Real-Time Project | Kevin George, Aaron Barr, Piotr Tatar, and Abel Milanés Betancourt (for Nevarro Canyon in "Chapter 12: The Siege") | Nominated | |
| Visual Effects Society Awards | 2021 | Outstanding Virtual Cinematography in a CG Project | Richard Bluff, Matt Jensen, Chris Williams, and Landis Fields IV (for "Chapter 15: The Believer") | Nominated | |
| Visual Effects Society Awards | 2021 | Outstanding Virtual Cinematography in a CG Project | Dave Crispino, Kyle Winkelman, Paul Kavanagh, and Jose Burgos (for "Chapter 12: The Siege") | Nominated | |
| Visual Effects Society Awards | 2021 | Outstanding Model in a Photoreal or Animated Project | Jay Machado, Enrico Damm, Gerald Blaise, and Ryan Church (for Boba Fett's Ship) | Nominated | |
| Visual Effects Society Awards | 2021 | Outstanding Model in a Photoreal or Animated Project | John Knoll, John Goodson, Dan Patrascu, and Rene Garcia (for The Light Cruiser in "Chapter 16: The Rescue") | Nominated | |
| Visual Effects Society Awards | 2021 | Outstanding Effects Simulations in an Episode, Commercial, or Real-Time Project | HuaiYuan Teh, Don Wong, Mathieu Chardonnet, and Prashanth Bhagavan (for The Krayt Dragon in "Chapter 9: The Marshal") | Nominated | |
| Visual Effects Society Awards | 2021 | Outstanding Compositing in an Episode | Peter Demarest, Christopher Balog, Shawn Mason, and David Wahlberg (for "Chapter 15: The Believer") | Nominated | |
| Visual Effects Society Awards | 2021 | Outstanding Compositing in an Episode | Nicolas Caillier, Simon Rafin, SiangKee Poh, and Simon Marinof (for "Chapter 9: The Marshal") | Nominated | |
| Visual Effects Society Awards | 2021 | Outstanding Compositing in an Episode | TC Harrison, Tami Carter, Jaume Creus Costabella, and Shane Davidson (for "Chapter 10: The Passenger") | Nominated | |
| Visual Effects Society Awards | 2024 | Outstanding Visual Effects in a Photoreal Episode | Grady Cofer, Abbigail Keller, Victor Schutz IV, Cameron Neilson, Scott Fisher (for "Chapter 24: The Return) | Nominated | |
| Visual Effects Society Awards | 2024 | Outstanding Effects Simulations in an Episode, Commercial, Game Cinematic or Real-Time Project | Travis Harkleroad, Florian Wietzel, Rick Hankins, Aron Bonar (for "Lake Monster Attack Water") | Won | |
| Visual Effects Society Awards | 2024 | Outstanding Compositing and Lighting in an Episode | Sam Wirch, Tory Mercer, Donny Rausch, Erich Ippen (for "Chapter 24: The Return) | Nominated | |
| Writers Guild of America Awards | 2021 | Drama Series | Rick Famuyiwa, Jon Favreau, and Dave Filoni | Nominated | |
