= Chapter 5: The Gunslinger =

- The Mandalorian episode
- Promotional poster
- Episode no.: Season 1 Episode 5
- Directed by: Dave Filoni
- Written by: Dave Filoni
- Cinematography by: Barry "Baz" Idoine
- Editing by: Andrew S. Eisen; Dana E. Glauberman
- Original release date: December 6, 2019
- Running time: 32 minutes

Co-starring
- Amy Sedaris as Peli Motto; Ming-Na Wen as Fennec Shand; Jake Cannavale as Toro Calican

Episode chronology
← Previous "Chapter 4: Sanctuary"	Next → "Chapter 6: The Prisoner"
- The Mandalorian season 1

"Chapter 5: The Gunslinger" is the fifth episode of the first season of the American streaming television series The Mandalorian. It was written and directed by executive producer Dave Filoni. The episode takes place in the Star Wars universe five years after the events of Return of the Jedi (1983). In the episode, the Mandalorian and the Child are forced to land in Mos Eisley to get the Razor Crest repaired after a dogfight. He teams up with an inexperienced bounty hunter to capture mercenary Fennec Shand, in order to get enough money to pay for the repair of the damaged ship.

It stars Pedro Pascal as the Mandalorian, while the Child is created through animatronics and puppetry augmented with visual effects. The episode also features co-stars Amy Sedaris, Ming-Na Wen, and Jake Cannavale. Favreau was hired to be the showrunner of the series in March 2018, while Filoni joined the series to direct two episodes for the season in October. Favreau and Filoni are also the executive producers of the series alongside Kathleen Kennedy and Colin Wilson.

"Chapter 5: The Gunslinger" was released on the streaming service Disney+ on December 6, 2019. The episode received generally positive reviews, with praise towards the visuals and the performances (particularly Sedaris), but criticism for its pacing and lack of main narrative course.

== Plot ==
The Mandalorian defeats a pursuing bounty hunter in a dogfight, but the Razor Crest is damaged, and he lands at a repair facility run by Peli Motto in Mos Eisley on Tatooine. While seeking work to pay for the repairs in a local cantina, he meets Toro Calican, an inexperienced hired gun looking to join the bounty hunters' guild by capturing Fennec Shand, a famed assassin. Despite misgivings, the Mandalorian agrees to let Calican take credit for Shand's capture so long as the repairs are paid for. Peli, meanwhile, has come across "the Child" and begins to take care of it while working on the ship, growing fond of it.

The Mandalorian and Calican travel into the Dune Sea on speeder bikes, looking for Shand. They come upon a traveling band of Tusken Raiders; the Mandalorian barters with them by trading Calican's brand new binoculars for passage. They eventually come across a Dewback with a dead bounty hunter attached to it, which turns out to be bait laid out by Shand to attract anyone looking for her. The duo manages to evade her sniper fire and capture her, but one of the speeders is destroyed in the process.

The Mandalorian goes to fetch the Dewback to replace the destroyed speeder, while Calican watches Shand. She tries to manipulate him by revealing that the Guild's bounties on the Mandalorian and the Child are worth a great deal more than her own. Calican is unconcerned with the bounty, but Shand replies that taking out the Mandalorian would make him a legend. She offers to help Calican capture the Mandalorian if he frees her; instead, Calican shoots her. Leaving the body where it fell, he returns to the spaceport and kidnaps Motto and the Child for his own trap. The Mandalorian arrives, uses a flash grenade to stun Calican, and shoots him dead. The Mandalorian then gives Calican's money to Motto to pay for the repairs on his ship and he leaves Tatooine. Out in the desert, a mysterious figure is seen approaching Shand's body. (Note: Revealed in Chapter 14: The Tragedy to have been Boba Fett.)

== Production ==
=== Development ===
Lucasfilm and Disney announced the development of a new live action Star Wars series that would be released for their streaming service Disney+ in November 2017. The series would be focused in the Mandalorians exploring the "scum and villainy" of the Star Wars universe taking place five years the events of the film Return of the Jedi (1983). The series would later reveal its official title The Mandalorian alongside the official premise. Lucasfilm president Kathleen Kennedy saw the opportunity of the series to allow a diverse group of writers and directors to create their own Star Wars stories. In March 2018, Jon Favreau was hired by Lucasfilm to be the head writer of the series, while Dave Filoni was announced to direct two episodes for the series by October, who also serves as the writer of the episode. Favreau and Filoni executive produce the series, alongside Kennedy and Colin Wilson. The first season's fifth episode titled "Chapter 5: The Gunslinger", was released on Disney+ on December 6, 2019.

=== Writing ===
The episode shows the Mandalorian still struggling to take care of the child, as Filoni considered that the character still was not fulfilling the role of a father, causing a discussion with another character about how to care for a child. Filoni took inspiration for Clint Eastwood's western film, Unforgiven (1992) for the development of the episode's story. For the episode, the Mandalorian cross paths with a younger and inexperienced but feckless and arrogant bounty hunter named Toro Calican. The character of Toro is inspired by "Schofield Kid", who both seek to become experienced bounty hunters. For the episode, Filoni reuses an old trope used in the western films where the old and now retired gunslinger reluctantly teams up with a younger one who is hungry for power but does not have the experience that they require, with the Mandalorian and the Gunslinger taking the roles respectively.

=== Casting ===
Amy Sedaris and Jake Cannavale were cast as Peli Motto and Toro Calican, respectively. At the D23 Expo in August 2019, it was revealed that Ming-Na Wen would appear in the series as Fennec Shand. Additional guest starring actors cast for this episode include Rio Hackford as Riot Mar, Troy Kotsur as a Tusken raider, and Steve Blum as the spaceport operator. Brendan Wayne and Lateef Crowder are credited as stunt doubles for The Mandalorian. Barry Lowin is credited as an additional double for The Mandalorian, while Milly Nalin, Trevor Logan, and Ming Qiu are credited as stunt doubles for Peli Motto, Toro Calican, and Fennec Shand, respectively. "The Child" was performed by various puppeteers. In the episode "Connections" of Disney Gallery: The Mandalorian, it was revealed that Mark Hamill, who played Luke Skywalker in the Star Wars films, provided the voice of the bartender droid EV-9D9.

=== Music ===
A soundtrack album for the episode was released by digitally by Walt Disney Records on December 6, 2019, featuring Ludwig Göransson's score. On August 24, 2020, it was announced that Mondo would be releasing a limited edition for the complete score of the first season on vinyl edition, consisting of 8-CD discs for each episode with each one set pressed with a 180 Gram vinyl disc housed in it own jacked that features artwork by Paul Mann, while the box set is adorned with Mando's mudhorn Signet. The pre-orders for the soundtrack started on June 26, and finally released on December 15.

The Mandalorian: Chapter 5 (Original Score)
No.	Title	Length
1.	"Warm or Cold"	1:39
2.	"Bright Eyes"	1:39
3.	"Stuck with Me Now"	2:26
4.	"Speederbikes"	1:21
5.	"Raiders"	1:20
6.	"Night Riders"	3:29
7.	"The Hangar"	6:06
8.	"Farewell"	2:09
Total length:		20:09

== Reception ==
"Chapter 5: The Gunslinger" received positive reviews. The review aggregator website Rotten Tomatoes holds an approval rating of 74% for the episode, with an average rating of 6.5/10, based on 31 reviews. The website's critics consensus reads, "The Gunslinger has flare and nostalgia to spare, but with only three episodes left to go, The Mandalorian's lack of forward momentum is starting to feel like narrative wheel spinning."

Alan Sepinwall of Rolling Stone praises the show for "keeping things simple, telling a clear story, and focusing on the strengths of your actors and your production. And The Mandalorian, like its title character, pretty consistently hits its targets. "The Gunslinger" continues this straightforward streak." Keith Phipps of Vulture gave the episode 4 out of 5 and wrote: "Part of what makes the Mandalorian such a compelling character is that he's great at his job but he's never superhumanly great at his job." Katie Rife of The A.V. Club gave the episode a B grade. She was excited at the prospect of seeing Mos Eisley and other callbacks to the original trilogy, but critical of the episode for being just more setup for the larger story arc: "I'm starting to wonder when we're going to get to the main course." Erik Kain while reviewing for Forbes, praised the show for bringing back the franchise to the planet of Tatooine and for using the fan-service very intelligently. In a positive review for the TVLine, Matt Webb Mitovich commented that the episode manages to bring back the Star Wars franchise to Tatooine as well as a very familiar face to the Marvel series Agents of S.H.I.E.L.D. fans. Bryan Young from /Film, deemed that the episode might be controversial for the fans as actress Ming Na Wen was used on the marketing of the show, only to be killed in the episode and considered that this might upset fans as they would consider that she was only used for ensuring that the show wanted to "assure us it was diverse."

In a negative review, Tyler Hersko, of IndieWire, stated that "Nostalgia is one thing, but the utter dearth of new ideas here just makes the bountiful references a glaring reminder that this has all been done much better before." While making a negative review for Decider, Walter Chaw considered that the episode wasn't following the storyline of the episode and stated that "there's nowhere to go with a Baby Yoda that's only used for cooing reaction shots, adorable misbehavior, and being a hostage." Paul Bradshaw who wrote for NME, considered that the series was starting to depart from the series though he stated that "Filoni loves a good standalone episode", and praised the episode as an improvement for the previous one. Charlie Hall from Polygon, stated that the episode "barely makes up for the cringes induced by the lead up", stating that unless the series follows a new path that deviates from the previous Star Wars projects, it will be risking the chance of losing a second season. While making a review for IGN, Joe Skrebels stated that the series has expanded the Star Wars universe but it has "shown restraint in letting that reference material take up too much of the limelight", and criticized the episode for not adding new to the plot. He gave out a 5.5 out of 10 for the episode.
