= The Mandalorian season 1 =

The Mandalorian
- Season 1
- Promotional poster
- Showrunner: Jon Favreau
- Starring: Pedro Pascal
- No. of episodes: 8

Release
- Original network: Disney+
- Original release: November 12 – December 27, 2019

Season chronology
- Next → Season 2

The first season of the American television series The Mandalorian is part of the Star Wars franchise, set after the events of the film Return of the Jedi (1983). It follows a lone bounty hunter who goes on the run to protect "The Child". The season was produced by Lucasfilm, Fairview Entertainment, and Golem Creations, with Jon Favreau serving as showrunner.

Pedro Pascal stars as the title character. Work on a new live-action Star Wars television series was announced in November 2017. Favreau signed on in March 2018, with Pascal cast a month after filming began in October 2018 at Manhattan Beach Studios in California. Visual effects company Industrial Light & Magic developed the StageCraft technology for the series, using virtual sets and a 360-degree video wall to create the series' environments. In addition to this new technology, practical effects were emphasized for the series.

The eight-episode season premiered on the streaming service Disney+ on November 12, 2019, and ran until December 27. It was met with positive reviews, with praise for the visual effects, action sequences, characters, performances (particularly Pascal's), the chemistry between the title character and the Child, cinematography, and Ludwig Göransson's musical score. It was nominated for Outstanding Drama Series at the 72nd Primetime Emmy Awards, and won seven Primetime Creative Arts Emmy Awards. A second season was confirmed in July 2019.

== Episodes ==
No. overall	No. in season	Title	Directed by	Written by	Original release date
1	1	"Chapter 1: The Mandalorian"	Dave Filoni	Jon Favreau	November 12, 2019
After completing a bounty for Guild leader Greef Karga, a Mandalorian bounty hunter accepts an under-the-table commission on the outpost world of Nevarro from an enigmatic Client with connections to the former Galactic Empire. The Client directs the Mandalorian to find an unnamed fifty-year-old target that the Client's colleague Dr. Pershing insists be brought back alive. The Mandalorian receives a single bar of beskar steel, sacred to his people, as a down payment. He takes the steel to a covert Mandalorian enclave where an armorer uses it to make him a pauldron. The Mandalorian travels to the planet of the target's last reported location, where vapor farmer Kuiil is tired of the constant bounty hunting activity in his area and hopes the Mandalorian can end it. Kuiil directs the Mandalorian to a heavily defended encampment where he reluctantly works with bounty hunting droid IG-11 to clear the camp and find the quarry, a child. IG-11 attempts to kill the infant per its bounty orders. The Mandalorian shoots and destroys the droid, taking the child alive.
2	2	"Chapter 2: The Child"	Rick Famuyiwa	Jon Favreau	November 15, 2019
The Mandalorian returns with the child to find his ship being stripped for parts by Jawas. He attacks them but they escape in their sandcrawler. The next day, Kuiil helps the Mandalorian locate the Jawas and negotiate the return of his ship's components. The Mandalorian agrees to retrieve the egg of a rhinoceros-like Mudhorn in exchange for the stolen parts. He and the child find the Mudhorn's cave, but the beast attacks him and damages his armor. After a prolonged battle, the Mudhorn is about to kill the Mandalorian when the child uses the Force to levitate the beast, allowing the surprised Mandalorian to stab and kill it. He collects the egg and takes it to the Jawas, who crack it open and eat its insides. With his ship's components returned to him, the Mandalorian works with Kuiil to repair the ship. The Mandalorian then leaves the planet with the child.
3	3	"Chapter 3: The Sin"	Deborah Chow	Jon Favreau	November 22, 2019
The Mandalorian delivers the child to the Client on Nevarro and collects the bounty, 20 bars of beskar steel. Uncharacteristically, the Mandalorian asks about the Client's plans for the child and is told that they are not his concern. Returning to the Mandalorian enclave, the armorer replaces and upgrades the Mandalorian's damaged armor and weapons using most of the beskar steel. The Mandalorian accepts a new job from Karga and prepares to depart. Feeling guilty for abandoning the child, he returns to the Client's base and kills the stormtroopers guarding it. He rescues the child from Dr. Pershing's laboratory, where it was being experimented on, but chooses not to kill the doctor. On the way back to his ship, the Mandalorian is ambushed by Karga and other bounty hunters who demand that he hand over the child. He refuses and a firefight begins. Outnumbered and cornered, the Mandalorian is saved when other Mandalorians arrive from the enclave, attacking the bounty hunters and allowing him to get to his ship and escape with the child.
4	4	"Chapter 4: Sanctuary"	Bryce Dallas Howard	Jon Favreau	November 29, 2019
Arriving on the sparsely populated forest planet Sorgan, the Mandalorian encounters ex-Rebel Alliance shock trooper-turned-mercenary Cara Dune. Dune is in hiding and asks the Mandalorian to leave so as to not draw attention to the planet. He prepares to leave, but is approached by desperate fishermen who offer to hire him. They want him to drive off a band of Klatoonian raiders that have been attacking their village. He accepts the job in exchange for lodging, and uses their credits to enlist Dune's help. They are housed by Omera, a widowed mother, and the Mandalorian confides in her that no one has seen him without his helmet since his tribe took him in as an orphaned child. The Mandalorian and Dune help the villagers drive the raiders away and destroy an old Imperial AT-ST the raiders were using. A few weeks later, with peace restored, the Mandalorian plans to leave the child in the village, but a Guild bounty hunter finds them and is killed by Dune. Realizing the child is not safe in the village, the Mandalorian departs with the child.
5	5	"Chapter 5: The Gunslinger"	Dave Filoni	Dave Filoni	December 6, 2019
The Mandalorian defeats a pursuing bounty hunter in a dogfight. He lands his damaged ship at a repair dock run by mechanic Peli Motto in Mos Eisley on Tatooine. He seeks work in a cantina to pay for the repairs, meeting aspiring bounty hunter Toro Calican, who is tracking elite mercenary and assassin Fennec Shand. Calican needs to catch Shand to join the Guild, and the Mandalorian agrees to help in exchange for the bounty reward. They capture Shand in the desert, but she destroys one of their speeder bikes. While the Mandalorian retrieves a dewback for transportation, Shand tells Calican that the Mandalorian betrayed the Guild by stealing the child, making the bounty on him and the child worth more than hers. Shand offers to help Calican capture the Mandalorian if he sets her free, but he shoots her instead and rides the remaining speeder bike to the repair dock, taking Motto and the Child hostage. The Mandalorian arrives, disorients Calican with a flare, and kills him. He uses Calican's money to pay Motto for the repairs and leaves Tatooine.
6	6	"Chapter 6: The Prisoner"	Rick Famuyiwa	Story by : Christopher Yost; Teleplay by : Christopher Yost and Rick Famuyiwa	December 13, 2019
The Mandalorian contacts his former partner Ran Malk for work, and is offered a place in a five-man job. He is joined by ex-Imperial sharpshooter Mayfeld, Devaronian strongman Burg, droid pilot Q9-0, and Twi'lek knife-expert Xi'an for a mission to rescue Xi'an's brother Qin, a prisoner of the New Republic. The team infiltrate the prison ship, fight off security droids, and kill the ship's security chief, though not before he triggers a security beacon. The crew rescue Qin but double-cross the Mandalorian. Q9-0 finds a message from Karga to the Mandalorian discussing the child, and finds the child in the Mandalorian's ship. Meanwhile, the Mandalorian escapes, defeats each crew member, and captures Qin. The Mandalorian leaves Mayfeld, Burg, and Xi'an locked up on the prison transport before delivering Qin to Ran. He departs with his payment while Ran immediately launches a fighter to kill the Mandalorian, but discovers the New Republic beacon on Qin. A trio of New Republic X-wing fighters arrive and attack Ran's station.
7	7	"Chapter 7: The Reckoning"	Deborah Chow	Jon Favreau	December 18, 2019
The Mandalorian receives a message from Karga, whose town on Nevarro has been overrun by the Client's troops. Karga proposes that the Mandalorian use the child as bait in order to kill the Client and free the town. In return, Karga would stop his guild from hunting the Mandalorian and the child. Sensing a trap, the Mandalorian recruits Dune and Kuiil, with Kuiil bringing along a rebuilt and reprogrammed IG-11 to protect the child. They meet Karga and his associates, but are attacked by flying creatures. Karga is injured and the child uses the Force to heal him. In return, Karga murders his associates and confesses his original plan to shoot the Mandalorian and take the child to the Client. Instead, Karga pretends that Dune has captured the Mandalorian while Kuiil returns the child to the ship. During the meeting, troops working for the Client's boss, Moff Gideon, open fire on the building and kill the Client, trapping the Mandalorian, Karga, and Dune inside. Moff Gideon arrives, demanding the child. Outside the town, scout troopers kill Kuiil and take the child.
8	8	"Chapter 8: Redemption"	Taika Waititi	Jon Favreau	December 27, 2019
IG-11 defeats the scout troopers and rescues the child. Gideon informs Karga, Dune, and the Mandalorian that they will be executed if they do not hand over the child. IG-11 arrives to save the others. Gideon's forces attack and the Mandalorian is injured. He instructs the others to escape and find help from the enclave while IG-11 removes his helmet to tend to his wounds. Joining the others afterwards, the Mandalorian discovers that the other Mandalorians are gone except for the Armorer. She tasks him with returning the child to its kind before holding off the arriving stormtroopers. The group escapes down an underground lava river on a ferry, but are ambushed by stormtroopers at the end of the tunnel. IG-11 self-destructs to defeat them. Gideon attacks in a TIE fighter but the Mandalorian uses his newly-forged jetpack to bring the craft down. After burying Kuiil, the Mandalorian embarks on his new mission with the child while Karga and Dune stay behind on Nevarro. Gideon survives the crash and frees himself with the Darksaber. (Note: The weapon is not identified on screen, but was later confirmed to be the Darksaber. It is a Mandalorian lightsaber that appeared previously in the animated series Star Wars: The Clone Wars and Star Wars Rebels.)

== Cast and characters ==
=== Starring ===
- Pedro Pascal as Din Djarin / The Mandalorian
- "The Child"

=== Recurring co-stars ===
- Carl Weathers as Greef Karga
- Werner Herzog as "The Client"
- Omid Abtahi as Dr. Pershing
- Nick Nolte as the voice of Kuiil (Note: Misty Rosas provided the on-set performance of Kuiil.)
- Taika Waititi as the voice of IG-11
- Gina Carano as Cara Dune
- Giancarlo Esposito as Moff Gideon
- Emily Swallow as "The Armorer"

=== Other co-stars ===
- Amy Sedaris as Peli Motto
- Jake Cannavale as Toro Calican
- Ming-Na Wen as Fennec Shand
- Mark Boone Junior as Ran Malk
- Bill Burr as Migs Mayfeld
- Natalia Tena as Xi'an
- Clancy Brown as Burg
- Richard Ayoade as the voice of Q9-0
- Ismael Cruz Córdova as Qin

== Production ==
=== Development ===
In November 2017, Disney CEO Bob Iger announced that Disney and Lucasfilm were developing a live-action Star Wars television series for the new streaming service Disney+. Jon Favreau pitched an idea for the series to Lucasfilm president Kathleen Kennedy, who suggested he discuss the idea with Dave Filoni, executive producer on the animated series Star Wars: The Clone Wars and Star Wars Rebels. In March 2018, Lucasfilm announced that Favreau would write and executive produce the series, with Filoni, Kennedy, and Colin Wilson also executive producing. In May, Favreau said he had written four of the series' eight episodes before being officially hired for the project.

Favreau announced that the series was titled The Mandalorian on October 3, and revealed the premise of the show. Directors for the season were revealed the next day, including Filoni, Taika Waititi, Bryce Dallas Howard, Rick Famuyiwa, and Deborah Chow. Favreau was unable to direct any of the first season due to his commitments to The Lion King (2019), and wanted the series' directors to be a diverse group of filmmakers who could bring different perspectives to the series. The only prerequisite he had for the directors was that they love Star Wars. According to Famuyiwa, Favreau described the group as a "Dirty Dozen, Magnificent Seven type of crew". The season had a budget of $100 million.

=== Casting ===
After being rumored to be cast in the title role, Pedro Pascal was confirmed to be portraying the Mandalorian in November 2018. Pascal initially thought he was being cast as the Star Wars character Boba Fett due to the visual similarities between that character and the Mandalorian, but the latter is actually a separate character named Din Djarin. Gina Carano and Nick Nolte joined the series' cast later in November. Lucasfilm announced the next month that Pascal would star alongside Carano, Nolte, Giancarlo Esposito, Emily Swallow, Carl Weathers, Omid Abtahi, and Werner Herzog. Favreau revealed in March 2019 that Taika Waititi would provide the voice for a bounty hunter droid in the series, believed to be the character IG-88. This was revealed a month later to be a new character, IG-11, when character details for other cast members were announced. Weathers' character, Greef Karga, was originally an alien that was killed off in the third episode; the prosthetic make-up was removed and the role extended during production.

The footage shown at Star Wars Celebration in April 2019 revealed that Bill Burr and Mark Boone Junior had been cast in the season, with Burr portraying an outlaw. At the D23 Expo in August, it was revealed Ming-Na Wen would appear, and the next month, Julia Jones's casting was announced.

=== Filming and effects ===
==== New technology ====
Visual effects studio Industrial Light & Magic, a subsidiary of Lucasfilm, partnered with video game developer Epic Games to create a new system for the series named StageCraft, based on Epic's game engine Unreal Engine. StageCraft consists of large LED video screens on which digital environments can be rendered in real time for actors to perform in front of. During pre-production on the series, virtual photography was used to plan the series' filming and determine what environments would be needed on set. The digital environments were then created by ILM and added to StageCraft ready for live action photography with the actors. Some of these environments were based on location photography in countries such as Iceland and Chile. During filming, the digital environments were rendered on a video wall in real time, allowing the filmmakers and actors to see the environments. The images rendered on the video wall were often of a high enough quality to be used as final effects.

==== Principal photography ====
Filming began during the first week of October 2018, with Filoni directing the first episode. The season was filmed at Manhattan Beach Studios in California under the working title Project Huckleberry, with limited location filming in the Los Angeles area. This first and third episodes were filmed together as one block, with Filoni and Chow working on their episodes at the same time. George Lucas visited the series' set as a birthday surprise for Favreau on October 19. Several items described as "nothing of substance" were stolen from the series' set on October 25.

Filoni made his live-action directorial debut with the series. He saw The Mandalorian as a chance to apply lessons he had learned from Lucas about live-action filmmaking during the making of the Star Wars animated series, and also described Favreau as a mentor who was furthering Filoni's education and could help him overcome challenges specific to live-action. Filoni also served as a second unit director for the other filmmakers, filming quick pick-up shots for them as needed while they were busy on other scenes. Favreau noted that the fourth episode of the series, "Sanctuary", was the most difficult to make due to its forest setting and action requirements, and joked that this was the reason that Howard, the most inexperienced of the first season's directors, was given that episode to direct. Howard felt protected by the experience of Favreau and Filoni, feeling comfortable to go to them with any questions about filmmaking and Star Wars, respectively. Howard also felt she had creative freedom when directing the episode, something that surprised her father Ron Howard who directed the film Solo: A Star Wars Story (2018).

Pascal's commitments to filming Wonder Woman 1984 (2020) and performing in a Broadway production of King Lear resulted in stunt doubles Brendan Wayne and Lateef Crowder portraying the Mandalorian on set in Pascal's absence, with Pascal later dubbing the lines. Pascal said he felt uneasy about this when there were "more than just a couple of pages of a one-on-one scene [and not] being able to totally author" the performance. But he said it was "so easy in such a sort of practical and unexciting way for it to be up to" Wayne and Crowder. Wayne worked with Pascal to develop the movements of the character. Filming for the first season wrapped on February 27, 2019.

==== Practical effects ====
Favreau and the series' directors put emphasis on using practical effects where possible, with Famuyiwa explaining that it was the combination of groundbreaking effects and a grounded world and characters that first drew him to Star Wars as a child. Favreau noted that the StageCraft technology used during filming allowed the filmmakers to use more traditional production techniques since they were working within an environment that they could see on set. Legacy Effects created practical armor for the series, as well as the animatronics for the alien creatures. Visual effects were used to remove puppeteers and control rods from scenes that used puppets. One of the modelmakers creating models and puppets for the series was Tony McVey, who worked on the original Star Wars films. In order to recreate techniques used on the original Star Wars films, The Mandalorian's prop master, Josh Roth, designed new weapons for the series based on real guns, as the original props had been modified versions of World War II gun props.

"The Child" was created primarily with an animatronic puppet, which was augmented with visual effects. The production had originally expected to mostly use CGI for the character. Different puppeteers controlled its body and head movements, its eyes, and its ears. Other puppeteers moved it for walking scenes. During filming on the third episode, Chow and the visual effects team removed the puppet so they could film a version of a scene without it. This was in case they decided that the puppet was not convincing enough and would need to be replaced with CGI. Herzog called them cowards for not trusting the puppet, and encouraged them not to avoid visual effects. He proved to be right, as the production discovered that the puppet worked better than expected and began retooling scenes to work around its limitations rather than resort to CGI.

Favreau wanted the series to feature "D-list" characters from the Star Wars films, which led to him creating the Ugnaught character Kuill. The species was first introduced in the background of The Empire Strikes Back (1980). Legacy's effects supervisor John Rosengrant explained that a performer could not emote through the heavy prosthetics required to portray an Ugnaught, so animatronics were added to the prosthetic head. Actress Misty Rosas wore the head and costume for the character while one puppeteer controlled the mouth movements and another controlled the eyebrows. The character's lines were recorded ahead of filming, with actor Nick Nolte providing two or three different readings for each line that could be played for the other actors. While performing, Rosas had to use physical signals to indicate to the puppeteers when she wanted the character speak.

The series includes Blurrgs, alien creatures that were first introduced in the non-canon film Ewoks: The Battle for Endor (1985). Filoni introduced them into canon with The Clone Wars and Rebels. They were primarily created with CGI, but the first time they are seen in the series, through the Mandalorian's binoculars, physical models were used. These were created by McVey and stop motion animated by Stoopid Buddy Stoodios. The stop motion movement informed the animation of the CGI Blurrgs. Legacy created a practical model of the droid assassin IG-11 as an on-set stand-in for lighting reference. It included the head, torso, and arms of the character, and basic puppeteering could be used to move the head. During filming, the awkward movement of the model was deemed to be a good fit for the character and it was used in more scenes than expected. The CGI version was moved in ways that would not be physically possible for a human performer, taking advantage of the character's inhuman appearance. This differed from K-2SO, a droid that animation director Hal Hickel had created for the film Rogue One: A Star Wars Story (2016), which was based on a motion capture performance.

For Rogue One, Hickel had collected various shots from the original Star Wars films of starships that had been created with physical models and motion control camera systems. He brought this collection to The Mandalorian as a style guide for how the Razor Crest should look and move. Favreau decided that he wanted a miniature model of the Razor Crest for lighting reference; the models for the series were created with a combination of 3D printing and hand sculpting. After seeing the model, Favreau suggested that a single shot be filmed using motion control techniques as further reference for the CGI. The series had not budgeted for this technique, which is more expensive than using CGI. ILM visual effects supervisor John Knoll built a new motion control rig for the series to use that he described as "garage operation style, quick and dirty". They went on to film 14 or 15 shots for the first season using the technique, and the remaining CGI shots of the Razor Crest in space were designed to emulate the model and motion control style.

==== Other visual effects ====
Shots of the child where visual effects were used instead of the puppet include some scenes where the character is walking, and a scene where he eats a frog. For these, the visual effects team studied the inner workings of the puppet to ensure that their version matched its physical limitations.

Image Engine also created visual effects for the series, particularly in "Chapter 3: The Sin" and "Chapter 6: The Prisoner".

=== Music ===
Composer Ludwig Göransson first met with Favreau in November 2018, when Favreau showed Göransson concept art for the series and discussed his inspirations for the story and tone, including Western and samurai films. After they began discussing the series, Favreau sent all of the season's scripts to Göransson. The composer worked on his own for a month, spending 10 hours a day in his studio "going from instrument to instrument" and experimenting with different sounds. He wrote five or six different pieces of music during this time as potential themes for the series. One of the first instruments Göransson experimented with was the recorder. He found a bass recorder that he felt sounded unique, and digitally manipulated it to make it more "futuristic". That became the beginning of the series' main theme. Favreau and Filoni both approved of Göransson's initial concepts, especially his use of the recorder which Göransson described as "a very original, distinct, lonely sound that follows this gunslinger on his journey."

Favreau wanted the music to come from the perspective of the Mandalorian, serving as a replacement for the character's facial expressions since he is always wearing a helmet. The Mandalorian's theme that Göransson initially wrote for Favreau is used during the end credits, with Göransson writing different end credits cues for some of the episodes. The style of the series' end credits was designed around the score due to Favreau's love of Göransson's music. Göransson also wrote themes for supporting characters such as Greef Karga and Cara Dune, a theme for the Razor Crest, one for all the Mandalorians, and a travelling theme. When he first approached "The Child", Göransson wrote music closer to John Williams' work for the Star Wars films since he felt the character was the element of the series that was closest to the films. He also felt it was natural for the character's music to be "cute". However, Favreau did not want this to be the direction for the character since the Mandalorian does not consider the child to be cute. Elements of Göransson's original music for the child are introduced later on as the Mandalorian sees the child begin to use the Force. Göransson wanted to differentiate the sound of each episode, but also considered his score for the first season to be like a score for a single film with the main themes appearing in each episode and developing across the whole season.

When Göransson began composing the music for specific scenes, he recorded himself playing the main instruments and then augmented those recordings with synthesizers and other digital manipulation. This was then combined with recordings of a 70-piece orchestra. The orchestra was recorded in Los Angeles from April to September 2019, and featured many musicians who were recording Williams' score for Star Wars: The Rise of Skywalker (2019) at the same time. Göransson oversaw the recording of the score with his wife, musician Serena McKinney. He wrote four hours of music for the first season. This was the most music he had written for a single project at that time, and he worked on the season longer than any other project at that point. A soundtrack album was released digitally alongside the debut of each episode featuring music from that episode.

== Marketing ==
On October 4, 2018, the first promotional image from the series was released, featuring a Mandalorian with a rifle. About a week later, Favreau released a photo through his official Instagram account featuring a rifle with a two-pronged barrel, an apparent callback to Boba Fett's weapon in The Star Wars Holiday Special. Jon Favreau, Dave Filoni, and the main cast hosted a panel for The Mandalorian at Star Wars Celebration Chicago on April 14, 2019, where the first footage premiered to fans in attendance. The first official poster and trailer were released at the D23 Expo on August 23, 2019. A second and final trailer was released on October 28, 2019. On November 11, a sneak peek was released during Monday Night Football.

=== "The Child" merchandise ===
Favreau chose not to reveal "The Child" in any marketing for the series after a discussion with Donald Glover during the making of The Lion King in which Glover noted that audiences appreciate being surprised since it does not happen very much (Glover gave the surprise release of a Beyoncé album as an example). Favreau stated that Disney was on board with this decision, even though it meant they were unable to begin work on merchandise featuring the character before he was revealed in the series premiere in November 2019. This was due to the potential for those merchandise plans to leak and reveal the character early, and meant that merchandise of the character could not be ready for the Christmas and holiday season. After the series premiered, "The Child" became a breakout character with more attention on social media and in news stories about it (1,161) than any of the Democrats running for president at the time. By the end of November 2019 there was huge demand for merchandise featuring the character. Disney's merchandising unit had begun planning for the character, but had only released T-shirts featuring concept art so far. Companies such as Hasbro had begun work on "The Child" merchandise as well, but it would not be ready until 2020. A large amount of unofficial merchandise began to appear ahead of the holiday season.

== Release ==
=== Streaming and broadcast ===
The season premiered on Disney+ on the streaming service's United States launch day, November 12, 2019. The second episode was released on November 15, with weekly releases for subsequent episodes. The seventh episode was released early on December 18 so it could include a sneak preview of Star Wars: The Rise of Skywalker, which was released on December 20. When Disney+ became available in several European countries in late March 2020, episodes of the season were again made available weekly despite the full season having already been released in other territories, an approach that James Whitbrook of io9 described as "perplexing" and "dumb". The first two episodes were made available at launch in the countries on March 24, 2020, followed by the third on March 27, which each subsequent episode released weekly. "Chapter 1: The Mandalorian" aired on ABC, Freeform, and FX on February 24, 2023, in anticipation of the season three premiere on March 1, 2023.

=== Home media ===
The season was released on Ultra HD Blu-ray and Blu-ray by Walt Disney Studios Home Entertainment on December 12, 2023, with Steelbook packaging and concept art cards. It included two featurettes, "Remnants of the Empire" that looks at the Imperial design within the series, and "Forging the Covert: Part One" with Favreau, Filoni, and other crew members examining the creation of the Child, the Mandalorian's arsenal, and the season's practical and digital effects.

== Reception ==
=== Critical response ===
The Mandalorian season 1: Critical reception by episode
Season 1 (2019): Percentage of positive critics' reviews tracked by the website Rotten Tomatoes

The review aggregator website Rotten Tomatoes reported a 93% approval rating with an average score of 8.05/10, based on 338 reviews. The site's critical consensus reads, "Action-packed and expertly-crafted—if at times a bit too withholding—The Mandalorian is a welcome addition to the Star Wars universe that benefits greatly from the cuteness of its cargo." Metacritic, which uses a weighted average, assigned a score of 70 out of 100 based on 29 critics, indicating "generally favorable" reviews.

Zaki Hasan of the San Francisco Chronicle said the show "in essence allows the franchise to take a mulligan with Boba Fett. Take the look, take that ineffable 'cool,' and transfer it over to an entirely new character who offers an untouched canvas, while giving the audience something that feels familiar." He added, "Three episodes in, that's really all The Mandalorian is: a feeling. A good feeling, mind you, but rather than any specific storytelling quality, it's that feeling you're talking about. The visual effects, the sound effects, the overall look of the thing is all bang-on. This is a polished production that shows off every cent of its feature film budget on every frame of its run time." Writing for The Ringer, Micah Peters said, "The Mandalorian may already be difficult to care about as something more than an installment that exists solely to set up the next installment. But there are still many enjoyable things about it, and also it's a Disney show with spaceships and giant sea slugs, so it doesn't need to be Citizen Kane. It might, however, be the next great TV Western." Rating the show with an 8 out of 10, Laura Prudom from IGN considered that the series succeeded where the sequel trilogy failed which is the creation of a story for Star Wars as the series "has the swagger and ambition to venture off the beaten path and into the uncharted regions of the Star Wars galaxy, delivering a freshman season that - while uneven - still manages to be one of the most surprising and satisfying Star Wars projects in decades."

While reviewing the season's finale, Sonia Saraiya from Vanity Fair highlighted the performances as "enthusiastic and spirited" which she considers to be an essential part to understand the characters motive, while also adding the importance of the family in the Star Wars franchise and said in her review, "The Mandalorian brings found family out of the subtext and into the foreground. So much of baby Yoda's power is not in his ability to manipulate the Force, but in how nakedly he wears his helpless innocence. His vulnerability cows and moves others around him when mere force can't; it polarizes the universe into the people willing to protect him, and the ones that aren't. Just as the Mandalorians found Din Djarin and rescued him because he was helpless, so Din will do the same for another creature—an expression of obligation to the innocent that Star Wars has never quite articulated before. Around father and child gather an unlikely crew of kindly mechanic, blustering bounty hunter, Alderaani refugee-turned-mercenary, and killer nurse-droid, drawn together by the loss of everything else—and the desire to nurture a little seed of the future. It is a relief and a joy to see that The Mandalorian knows what it is here to do; it knows who it is fighting for." Fionnuala Halligan of the Screen Daily wrote, "From the aforementioned bars, to market sequences, the jabbering Jawas with their moveable fortress, to blistering sunsets in the sand, The Mandalorian makes a pilgrimage to pay its respects to the cinematic origins of this series. Production design by Andrew L. Jones draws from the past with reverence. Pretty soon, though, Favreau and his team are adding their own iconography, whether that be the immovable helmet, a floating crib, or the sight of The Mandalorian himself in his full Mescar [sic] armour as he cradles a small package in the manner of Chow Yun-fat in Hard Boiled."

Reviewing the show for Metro, Keith Watson gave the series 3 of 5 stars adding, "Two words: Baby Yoda. Almost single-handedly the cute critter has given this Star Wars spin-off a meme-led profile that will distract from the realisation that, although it's undoubtedly an imaginatively staged entry in the iconic sci-fi franchise universe, the action does get ploddy at times. The timeline lands us between Return Of The Jedi and The Force Awakens as we follow bounty hunter The Mandalorian — or Mando to his chums, if he had any — a masked mystery man (pictured top) who reveals a soft side when confronted with the aforementioned infant Yoda. Their bonding is cute or cringy, depending on your sentimentality levels." As a fanatic from Star Wars and writing to Forbes, Erik Kain called the show as a "visually sumptuous adventure through the dirtier, less glorified corridors of the Star Wars universe", and deemed the show as the best return to Star Wars since Return of the Jedi. Kain also praised Göransson's score, deeming it as one of the highlights of the show and calling it a perfect way to capture the music of Star Wars and a classic western. While reviewing for the Chicago Sun-Time, Richard Roeper rated the show with 3 and half stars of 4, noting Baby Yoda as "an instant contender for most adorable creature in the Star Wars universe" and lauding the references of the series to the spaghetti western genre. Roeper also praised Pascal's performance noting his "distinctive personality through his line readings and the physicality of the character", describing him as a "Clint Eastwood in Robocop armor".

=== Audience viewership ===
Within four days of its release, The Mandalorian had stronger U.S. demand compared to four of 2019's biggest streaming originals: Netflix's The Umbrella Academy, When They See Us, The Dark Crystal: Age of Resistance, and Amazon Prime Video's Good Omens. However, it registered less than 40% of the demand of Netflix's Stranger Things and was behind other established shows such as DC Universe's Titans, nor was it in the top 10 for the most in-demand shows across all TV networks and digital services for the week of November 10–16. TV Time, a popular app allowing users to track shows and movies they are watching (or want to watch), stated though that the number of people interested in The Mandalorian had doubled for the following week, and noted that it had the largest gain of any TV show.

=== Accolades ===
Year	Award	Category	Nominee(s)	Result	Ref.
2020	Visual Effects Society Awards	Outstanding Visual Effects in a Photoreal Episode	Richard Bluff, Abbigail Keller, Jason Porter, Hayden Jones and Roy Cancinon (for "Chapter 2: The Child")	Won	
2020	Visual Effects Society Awards	Outstanding Virtual Cinematography in a CG Project	Richard Bluff, Jason Porter, Landis Fields IV and Baz Idione (for "Chapter 6: The Prisoner"; The Roost)	Nominated	
2020	Visual Effects Society Awards	Outstanding Animated Character in an Episode or Real-Time Project	Terry Bannon, Rudy Massar and Hugo Leygnac (for "Chapter 2: The Child"; Mudhorn)	Nominated	
2020	Visual Effects Society Awards	Outstanding Model in a Photoreal or Animated Project	Doug Chiang, Jay Machado, John Goodson and Landis Fields IV (for "Chapter 3: The Sin"; The Razorcrest)	Won	
2020	Visual Effects Society Awards	Outstanding Created Environment in an Episode, Commercial, or Real-Time Project	Alex Murtaza, Yanick Gaudreau, Marco Tremblay and Maryse Bouchard (for Nevarro Town)	Nominated	
2020	Visual Effects Society Awards	Outstanding Effects Simulations in an Episode, Commercial, or Real-Time Project	Xavier Martin Ramirez, Ian Baxter, Fabio Slino and Andrea Rosa (for "Chapter 2: The Child"; Mudhorn)	Nominated	
2020	Art Directors Guild Awards	One-Hour Period or Fantasy Single-Camera Series	Andrew L. Jones (for "Chapter 1: The Mandalorian")	Nominated	
2020	ICG Publicists Awards	Maxwell Weinberg Publicist Showmanship Television Award	Disney+	Won	
2020	Nebula Awards	Ray Bradbury Award for Outstanding Dramatic Presentation	Jon Favreau (for "Chapter 2: The Child")	Nominated	
2020	Hugo Awards	Best Dramatic Presentation - Short Form	Jon Favreau and Taika Waititi (for "Chapter 8: Redemption")	Nominated	
2020	TCA Awards	Outstanding New Program	The Mandalorian	Nominated	
2020	Primetime Emmy Awards	Outstanding Drama Series	Jon Favreau, Dave Filoni, Kathleen Kennedy, Colin Wilson and Karen Gilchrist	Nominated	
2020	Primetime Creative Arts Emmy Awards	Outstanding Character Voice-Over Performance	Taika Waititi as IG-11 (for "Chapter 8: Redemption")	Nominated	
2020	Primetime Creative Arts Emmy Awards	Outstanding Cinematography for a Single-Camera Series (Half-Hour)	Greig Fraser and Baz Idoine (for "Chapter 7: The Reckoning")	Won	
2020	Primetime Creative Arts Emmy Awards	Outstanding Fantasy/Sci-Fi Costumes	Joseph Porro, Julie Robar, Gigi Melton and Lauren Silvestri (for "Chapter 3: The Sin")	Nominated	
2020	Primetime Creative Arts Emmy Awards	Outstanding Guest Actor in a Drama Series	Giancarlo Esposito as Moff Gideon (for "Chapter 8: Redemption")	Nominated	
2020	Primetime Creative Arts Emmy Awards	Outstanding Music Composition for a Series	Ludwig Göransson (for "Chapter 8: Redemption")	Won	
2020	Primetime Creative Arts Emmy Awards	Outstanding Production Design for a Narrative Program (Half-Hour or Less)	Andrew L. Jones, Jeff Wisniewski, Amanda Serino (for "Chapter 1: The Mandalorian")	Won	
2020	Primetime Creative Arts Emmy Awards	Outstanding Prosthetic Makeup for a Series, Limited Series, Movie or Special	Brian Sipe, Alexei Dmitriew, Carlton Coleman, Samantha Ward, Scott Stoddard, Mike Ornelaz and Sabrina Castro (for "Chapter 6: The Prisoner")	Nominated	
2020	Primetime Creative Arts Emmy Awards	Outstanding Single-Camera Picture Editing for a Drama Series	Andrew S. Eisen (for "Chapter 2: The Child")	Nominated	
2020	Primetime Creative Arts Emmy Awards	Outstanding Single-Camera Picture Editing for a Drama Series	Dana E. Glauberman and Dylan Firshein (for "Chapter 4: Sanctuary")	Nominated	
2020	Primetime Creative Arts Emmy Awards	Outstanding Single-Camera Picture Editing for a Drama Series	Jeff Seibenick (for "Chapter 8: Redemption")	Nominated	
2020	Primetime Creative Arts Emmy Awards	Outstanding Sound Editing for a Comedy or Drama Series (Half-Hour) and Animation	David Acord, Matthew Wood, Bonnie Wild, James Spencer, Richard Quinn, Richard Gould, Stephanie McNally, Ryan Rubin, Ronni Brown and Jana Vance (for "Chapter 1: The Mandalorian")	Won	
2020	Primetime Creative Arts Emmy Awards	Outstanding Sound Mixing for a Comedy or Drama Series (Half-Hour) and Animation	Shawn Holden, Bonnie Wild and Chris Fogel (for "Chapter 2: The Child")	Won	
2020	Primetime Creative Arts Emmy Awards	Outstanding Special Visual Effects	Richard Bluff, Jason Porter, Abbigail Keller, Hayden Jones, Hal Hickel, Roy Cancino, John Rosengrant, Enrico Damm and Landis Fields (for "Chapter 2: The Child")	Won	
2020	Primetime Creative Arts Emmy Awards	Outstanding Stunt Coordination for a Drama Series, Limited Series or Movie	Ryan Watson	Won	
2021	Saturn Awards	Best Television Presentation (under 10 Episode)	The Mandalorian	Won	
2021	Saturn Awards	Best Guest Starring Role on Television	Giancarlo Esposito	Nominated	

== Documentary series ==
In April 2020, Disney announced an eight-episode documentary series titled Disney Gallery: The Mandalorian (also known as Disney Gallery / Star Wars: The Mandalorian), which premiered on Disney+ on May 4, 2020, Star Wars Day. The series features interviews with the cast and crew of The Mandalorian, behind-the-scenes footage, and roundtable conversations hosted by Favreau that explore the production of The Mandalorian. Subsequent episodes of the series were released weekly on Disney+.

Disney Gallery: The Mandalorian episodes
No. overall	No. in season	Title	Directed by	Original release date
1	1	"Directing"	Bradford Baruh	May 4, 2020
Favreau interviews the directors of season one: Dave Filoni, Deborah Chow, Rick Famuyiwa, Bryce Dallas Howard, and Taika Waititi (the directors roundtable). Additional segments feature Baz Idoine and Gina Carano.
2	2	"Legacy"	Bradford Baruh	May 8, 2020
Favreau discusses the legacy of Star Wars with the creatives roundtable (Filoni, John Knoll, Kathleen Kennedy, Richard Bluff, and Hal Hickel) and the directors roundtable. Additional segments feature Pedro Pascal and Carl Weathers.
3	3	"Cast"	Bradford Baruh	May 15, 2020
Favreau discusses the cast and characters of season one with the actors roundtable (Pascal, Weathers, and Carano, along with Filoni) and the directors roundtable. Additional segments feature Brendan Wayne, Lateef Crowder, and Kim Richards.
4	4	"Technology"	Bradford Baruh	May 22, 2020
Favreau discusses the technology behind The Mandalorian with the directors, creatives, and actors roundtables. Additional segments feature Idoine and Giancarlo Esposito.
5	5	"Practical"	Bradford Baruh	May 29, 2020
Favreau discusses the practical effects in The Mandalorian with the directors and creatives roundtables. Additional segments feature John Rosengrant, Misty Rosas, Werner Herzog, Richards, Jason Matthews, Trevor Hensley, Hiroshi "Kan" Ikeuchi, Mike Manzel, Tamara Carlson Woodard, Idoine, Carano, Pascal, and Josh Roth.
6	6	"Process"	Bradford Baruh	June 5, 2020
Favreau discusses the visualization process used to make The Mandalorian with the directors and creatives roundtables.
7	7	"Score"	Bradford Baruh	June 12, 2020
Favreau discusses the score of The Mandalorian with Ludwig Göransson and Filoni.
8	8	"Connections"	Bradford Baruh	June 19, 2020
Favreau reveals the connections between various props and characters of the Star Wars franchise and the ones shown in The Mandalorian with the directors and creatives roundtables. Additional segments feature Roth, Andrew L. Jones, and some members of the 501st Legion. (Note: The featured members of the 501st Legion are Marie Gwin, Jeff Leone, Brent Wilkinson, Michael Bender, Todd Masters, Manuel Dekker, Rick Alpi, Jacko Luong, Mark Edwards, Jacob Gonzales, Chris Elguera, and Sam Newcomer.)
