= Chapter 2: The Child =

- The Mandalorian episode
- Promotional poster
- Episode no.: Season 1 Episode 2
- Directed by: Rick Famuyiwa
- Written by: Jon Favreau
- Cinematography by: Barry "Baz" Idoine
- Editing by: Andrew S. Eisen
- Original release date: November 15, 2019
- Running time: 30 minutes

Co-starring
- Nick Nolte as the voice of Kuiil

Episode chronology
← Previous "Chapter 1: The Mandalorian"	Next → "Chapter 3: The Sin"
- The Mandalorian season 1

"Chapter 2: The Child" is the second episode of the first season of the American streaming television series The Mandalorian. It was written by the series' showrunner Jon Favreau and directed by Rick Famuyiwa. The episode takes place in the Star Wars universe five years after the events of Return of the Jedi (1983). In the episode, the Jawas strip the Mandalorian's ship the Razor Crest in several parts. Having successfully retrieved the asset which is revealed to be a Child but trapped on the planet, the Mandalorian is forced to negotiate with the Jawas to recover his ship components with the help of Kuiil.

It stars Pedro Pascal as the Mandalorian, while the Child is created through animatronics and puppetry augmented with visual effects. The episode also features co-star Nick Nolte. Favreau was hired to be the showrunner of the series in March 2018, while Famuyiwa joined the series to direct two episodes for the season in October. Favreau also serves as the executive producer of the series alongside Dave Filoni, Kathleen Kennedy and Colin Wilson (film producer).

"Chapter 2: The Child" was released on the streaming service Disney+ on November 15, 2019. The episode received positive reviews, with praise towards Nolte's vocal performance as Kuiil, and the chemistry between the Mandalorian and the Child. It received several accolades, including three Primetime Emmy Awards nominations, winning two of them.

== Plot ==
While returning to his ship on foot with "the Child" in tow, the Mandalorian is ambushed by a trio of Trandoshan mercenaries. He disintegrates one attempting to rush and kill the Child, revealing a tracking fob. Upon returning to his ship, he finds a team of Jawas scavenging it for parts. After a short battle, they retreat in their Sandcrawler and stun the Mandalorian unconscious with ion blasts. He returns to his ship, finding it stripped bare and all of his weaponry stolen. With the assistance of Kuiil, he grudgingly bargains with the Jawas to return his ship's parts in return for retrieving the egg of a mudhorn.

The Mandalorian fights the mudhorn, but he is battered and thrown around, his weapons failing and his armor heavily damaged. As the beast charges to finish the Mandalorian, the Child uses the Force to lift it, allowing the Mandalorian to go for the kill by stabbing it in the neck. He returns with the egg, and the Jawas cut it open and eat its contents. He and Kuiil repair his ship, but Kuiil turns down both a reward and an offer to crew the ship. After parting as friends, the Mandalorian takes to space, and the Child wakes up after exhausting itself using the Force.

== Production ==
=== Development ===
Lucasfilm and Disney announced the development of a new live action Star Wars series that would be released for their streaming service Disney+ in November 2017. The series would be focused in the Mandalorians exploring the "scum and villainy" of the Star Wars universe taking place five years after the events of the film Return of the Jedi (1983). The series would later reveal its official title The Mandalorian along with the official premise. Lucasfilm president Kathleen Kennedy saw the opportunity of the series to allow a diverse group of writers and directors to create their own Star Wars stories. In March 2018, Jon Favreau was hired by Lucasfilm to be the head writer of the series, while Rick Famuyiwa was announced to direct two episodes for the series by October. The executive producers of the series include Kennedy, Favreau, Dave Filoni and Colin Wilson. The first season's second episode titled "Chapter 2: The Child", was written by Favreau, and was released on Disney+ on November 15, 2019.

=== Writing ===
Before the series premiere, several rumors emerged in which teased that the plot would be focused on the relationship between The Mandalorian and a Child that would be of the same species as Yoda. These would be later confirmed at the end of the previous episode, when the Child makes his first appearance. From this episode to onwards, the series soon starts to take its focus on the relationship of the Mandalorian and the Child, causing the former to feel a connection and parental bond with the latter because of his tragic childhood, due to his parents being killed and having been adopted by the Mandalorian culture as a "foundling". Soon the two start travelling through dangerous adventures in different episodes, where the former has to protect the latter from the dangers that they are forced to confront during their journey. For the development of the relationship between the two lead characters, Favreau took inspiration from the comic book manga Lone Wolf and Cub, as it follows a similar storyline where the protagonist Ogami Ittō is forced to travel with his child on a dangerous journey with his baby child Daigorō. The manga and the series involves their lead characters get their own episodic stories, as they get into different conflicts as they continue travelling through a dangerous world. Favreau used the same species of Yoda for the baby as he states that "we don't know a lot of details about his species".

Favreau kept the existence of the Child by so he kept it as a secret by withholding him from the series marketing and merchandise, as he promised that the series was going to have surprises for the Star Wars fans. The reason of keeping it a secret was because he did not wanted to reveal the character as a part of getting the character's attention to become stronger than the marketing and to keep the audience watching the show. He stated "I thought it was very important to establish that there were going to be surprises. When you are promoting a film, you are putting your best stuff out there in the marketing campaign because you want everybody to show up that Friday. Television is different. You want to be able to build. You want word-of-mouth to spread. You want people to tune in and know that something is going to happen that they are going to want to talk about." Following its debut, the Child soon rapidly became a viral sensation on the social media as Favreau predicted. The film also references an scene from Indiana Jones and the Last Crusade (1989), when Indiana Jones attempts to climb a tank but the Nazis crash their vehicle to get rid of Indy. This scene is reused when the main character attempts to climb the sandcrawler but the Jawas attempt to crash their vehicle in a rock, similarly to the scene of the tank.

=== Casting ===
In November 2018, Nick Nolte was cast as the voice of Kuiil. Misty Rosas is credited as performance artist for Kuiil. The Jawa elder is played by Stephen Jackson Powers Jr. "The Child" was performed by various puppeteers.

=== Filming and visual effects ===
Principal photography began in the first week of October 2018 in Southern California. Filming took place at the Manhattan Beach Studios in California under the working title Project Huckleberry, while also receiving a limited location filming in the area of Los Angeles. The series applies the StageCraft which was created with the intention of capturing the digital environments rendered on a video wall in real time in order to bring high quality images for the to final effects. Filming for the first season wrapped on February 27, 2019. Visual effects for the episode were created by Industrial Light & Magic (ILM), Base FX, ImagineEngine, MPC, Pixomondo, El Ranchito, Ghost FX, Hybride FX, and Important Looking Pirates. The development of the visual effects was supervised by Richard Bluff.

=== Music ===
A soundtrack album for the episode was released by digitally by Walt Disney Records on November 15, 2019, featuring Ludwig Göransson's score. On August 24, 2020, it was announced that Mondo would be releasing a limited edition for the complete score of the first season on vinyl edition, consisting of 8-CD discs for each episode with each one set pressed with a 180 Gram vinyl disc housed in its own jacket which features artwork by Paul Mann, while the box set is adorned with Mando's mudhorn Signet. The pre-orders for the soundtrack started on June 26, and finally released on December 15.

The Mandalorian: Chapter 2 (Original Score)
No.	Title	Length
1.	"Walking on Mud"	1:38
2.	"Jawas Attack"	3:46
3.	"Trashed Crest"	2:18
4.	"To the Jawas"	1:35
5.	"The Egg"	2:54
6.	"The Mudhorn"	3:00
7.	"Celebration"	3:31
8.	"The Next Journey"	2:35
Total length:		21:17

== Reception ==
=== Critical response ===
"Chapter 2: The Child" received largely positive reviews. On Rotten Tomatoes, the episode holds an approval rating of 93% with an average rating of 7.5/10, based on 40 reviews. The website's critics consensus reads, "Short, but effective, "The Child" answers few questions, but moves the story along with a beautiful simplicity that is at once satisfying and intriguing."

Chris E. Hayner of the GameSpot described the second episode as "the show we were looking for". Susana Polo of Polygon said the episode "feels like one of Cartoon Network's greatest hits" comparing it to Samurai Jack. Walter Chow of Decider praised the episode for getting its minor ambitions as he commented that the series "becomes a true work of fan love", finding the way to allow audiences to separate from the original trilogy. Ben Lindbergh of The Ringer questioned the Mandalorian's skill believed being "the best in the parsec, but after getting dunked on repeatedly on Arvala-7, it seems like that endorsement translates to 'the most functional bounty hunter in a limited talent pool'". Paul Bradshaw from NME considered the idea of introducing the Mandalorian mythology after being almost ignored for years to be refreshing, and also praised Göranson musical score stating that the electrical guitar chords allows the episode's big reveal to sound "cool" as it should. Giving the episode a 9 out of 10, Laura Prudom stated that the show becomes a delight by managing to make the audience feel odd with the "perceptions of bloodthirsty bounty hunters and lone gunslingers - while also managing to feel quintessentially Star Wars."

Anthony Breznican of Vanity Fair commented that the episode had a very simple plot but that the "episode showed a bit of the man beneath the mask" and praised the character development of the protagonist. While reviewing from Forbes, Erik Kain was positive towards the characters and for capturing the old essence of the Star Wars franchise "from the pacing to the humor to the look and feel of the old films", though he lamented that the episodes have a short runtime and that the series would only run for eight episodes, stating that the it may not have enough time to meet the characters. Dave Trumbore while giving a review for Collider stated that the show keeps "its western Man with No Name aesthetic while also working in a heavy dose of Lone Wolf and Cub." For a review in Vulture, Keith Phipps stated that even if the series still does not finds out what kind of show is, it succeeds by getting "the job done and tells the story it needs to tell."

=== Accolades ===
Award	Date of ceremony	Category	Recipient(s)	Result	Ref(s)
Visual Effects Society Awards	January 7, 2020	Outstanding Visual Effects in a Photoreal Episode	Richard Bluff, Abbigail Keller, Jason Porter, Hayden Jones and Roy Cancino	Won	
Visual Effects Society Awards	January 7, 2020	Outstanding Animated Character in an Episode or Real-Time Project	Terry Bannon, Rudy Massar and Hugo Leygnac	Nominated	
Visual Effects Society Awards	January 7, 2020	Outstanding Effects Simulations in an Episode, Commercial, or Real-Time Project	Xavier Martin Ramirez, Ian Baxter, Fabio Slino and Andrea Rosa	Nominated	
Nebula Awards	May 30, 2020	Ray Bradbury Award for Outstanding Dramatic Presentation	Jon Favreau	Nominated	
Primetime Creative Arts Emmy Awards	September 14–17 & 19, 2020	Outstanding Single-Camera Picture Editing for a Drama Series	Andrew S. Eisen	Nominated	
Primetime Creative Arts Emmy Awards	September 14–17 & 19, 2020	Outstanding Sound Mixing for a Comedy or Drama Series (Half-Hour) and Animation	Shawn Holden, Bonnie Wild, and Chris Fogel	Won	
Primetime Creative Arts Emmy Awards	September 14–17 & 19, 2020	Outstanding Special Visual Effects	Richard Bluff, Jason Porter, Abbigail Keller, Hayden Jones, Hal Hickel, Roy Cancino, John Rosengrant, Enrico Damm, and Landis Fields	Won	
Cinema Audio Society Awards	April 17, 2021	Outstanding Achievement in Sound Mixing for Television Series – 1/2 Hour	Shawn Holden, Bonnie Wild, Stephen Urata, Christopher Fogel, Matthew Wood, and Blake Collins	Won	
