= Chapter 4: Sanctuary =

- The Mandalorian episode
- Promotional poster
- Episode no.: Season 1 Episode 4
- Directed by: Bryce Dallas Howard
- Written by: Jon Favreau
- Cinematography by: Barry "Baz" Idoine
- Editing by: Dana E. Glauberman
- Original release date: November 29, 2019
- Running time: 38 minutes

Co-starring
- Gina Carano as Cara Dune; Julia Jones as Omera

Episode chronology
← Previous "Chapter 3: The Sin"	Next → "Chapter 5: The Gunslinger"
- The Mandalorian season 1

"Chapter 4: Sanctuary" is the fourth episode of the first season of the American streaming television series The Mandalorian. It was written by the series' showrunner Jon Favreau and directed by Bryce Dallas Howard. The episode takes place in the Star Wars universe five years after the events of Return of the Jedi (1983). In the episode, the Mandalorian and the Child arrive at the forest planet Sorgan seeking a place to hide. In exchange of a sanctuary, the former agrees to help a group of farmers to fight Klatooinian riders with the help of mercenary Cara Dune, who is also in hiding.

It stars Pedro Pascal as the Mandalorian, while the Child is created through animatronics and puppetry augmented with visual effects. The episode also features co-stars Gina Carano and Julia Jones. Favreau was hired to be the showrunner of the series in March 2018, while Howard joined the series to direct an episode for the season in October. Favreau also serves as the executive producer of the series alongside Dave Filoni, Kathleen Kennedy and Colin Wilson.

"Chapter 4: Sanctuary" was released on the streaming service Disney+ on November 29, 2019. The episode received positive reviews, with praise towards Howard's direction, Dune's introduction, as well as Carano's performance and the action sequences. It received a Primetime Emmy Award nomination.

== Plot ==
On Sorgan, a sparsely populated forested swamp planet, a village of farmers is raided by Klatooinian bootleggers operating nearby. The Mandalorian soon lands on Sorgan looking to hide from their pursuers with "the Child". At a local tavern, they come across pit fighter and mercenary Cara Dune, a former Rebel shock trooper in hiding on the planet, who asks the Mandalorian to leave. Back at the Razor Crest, the Mandalorian is approached by two of the villagers hoping to hire him to drive off the Klatooinians. He accepts in return for lodging in the isolated village and uses their payment to hire Dune for extra help. Once in the village, a widowed mother named Omera agrees to house and feed them. Dune and the Mandalorian find a set of tracks in the mud outside the village and deduce that the raiders have access to a powerful Imperial All-Terrain Scout Transport. Dune insists the villagers leave and make their home elsewhere, but they refuse and insist on helping organize a defense.

The Mandalorian and Dune train the farmers in combat and set traps in the krill ponds for the AT-ST. They also stage an attack on the raiders' camp to provoke them into a fight. The AT-ST then chases them back to the village but avoids the traps, allowing the raiders to quickly gain the upper hand. Dune then gets beneath the AT-ST, shooting into one of the viewports. The AT-ST takes the bait and steps into the pond, sinks, and then falls over. The Mandalorian then throws a thermal detonator into the walker, blowing it up, and the surviving raiders flee back into the forest. A few weeks later, with peace having returned, the Child plays happily with the other children. The Mandalorian tells Dune and Omera that he plans to leave the Child there as he feels it would be a better life. However, a Kubazi bounty hunter who had been tracking them is able to get the drop on the Child. Before he can fire, Dune shoots him from behind. The Mandalorian realizes the Child has to stay under his protection. He bids farewell to Omera and Dune and leaves the village.

== Production ==
=== Development ===
Lucasfilm and Disney announced the development of a new live action Star Wars series that would be released for their streaming service Disney+ in November 2017. The series following would eventually be picking up the idea of focusing on the Mandalorians that would explore the "scum and villainy" of the Star Wars universe, taking place five years after the events of the film Return of the Jedi (1983). The series would later reveal its official title The Mandalorian alongside the official premise. Lucasfilm president Kathleen Kennedy saw the opportunity of the series to allow a diverse group of writers and directors to create their own Star Wars stories. In March 2018, Jon Favreau was hired by Lucasfilm to be the series showrunner, while Bryce Dallas Howard was announced to direct an episode for the series by October. Howard is the second woman to direct a live-action project for the Star Wars franchise. According to Howard, Favreau and Filoni allowed individual episode directors the freedom to "put our stamp on everything". She said this surprised her father, Ron Howard, who directed Lucasfilm's Solo: A Star Wars Story (2018). The executive producers of the series include Kennedy, Favreau, Dave Filoni and Colin Wilson. The first season's fourth episode titled "Chapter 4: Sanctuary", was written by Favreau. and was released on Disney+ on November 29, 2019.

=== Writing ===
The episode focuses on the Mandalorian being hired by a group of villagers to protect them from a group of raiders who constantly attack them and steal the resources. Favreau took inspiration from the Samurai film Seven Samurai (1954) and the Western film The Magnificent Seven (1960), for the development of the story. The episode's story is reminiscent of both films, as the stories focuses on a group of villagers hiring samurais and gunfighters respectively in order to protect them from a group of bandits and soon are trained so they can defend their village. This idea was previously used by Zack Snyder for the development of a new Star Wars film after production of the Star Wars prequel trilogy before the project was canceled after Disney bought the franchise in 2012, though the idea would be used for Snyder's film Rebel Moon (2023). Reading the script for the first time, Dallas Howard expressed her excitement for the relationship between the Mandalorian and the farmer Omera, who originally lacked a name until Howard asked Favreau if she could have one, leading her then-assistant Sonia Aurora, a huge Star Wars fan, to coin it, which made Howard feel that it significantly added more depth and importance to the character's role in the story.

The Mandalorian still attempts to avoid the role of parenthood once again by leaving the Child with Omera, a protective mother in the planet of Sorgan, who also tries to convince the Mandalorian to leave his current life as an assassin to start a new one but he declines, feeling that he will never be able to accomplish it. Favreau took the scene of the ending of Western film The Searchers (1956), in which the protagonist Ethan Edwards contemplates entering the house with the rest of the characters and start a new life, but at the end decides not to as he realizes that he doesn't fit in and leaves. Dallas Howard felt that exploring the emotional tension between the Mandalorian's internal conflict of being devoted to the Mandalorian creed to never remove his helmet while developing feelings for Omera, added a sort of tension as it would naturally happen to someone like that who falls in love. For the scene that takes place at the local restaurant, an animal bares its fangs and hisses at the Child. The creature is called a Loth-cat, and first appeared in the animated series Star Wars Rebels (2014-2018) and is native to the planet Lothal.

=== Casting ===
In November 2018, Gina Carano was cast as Cara Dune. Additional guest starring actors cast for this episode include Julia Jones as Omera, Isla Farris as Winta, Asif Ali as Caben, Eugene Cordero as Stoke, Tiffany Thomas, Aydrea Walden and Trula Marcus as Sorgan farmers, Sala Baker as the Klatooinian raider captain, and Ida Darvish as the common house proprietor. Barry Lowin is credited as an additional double for The Mandalorian, while Amy Sturdivant and Lauren Mary Kim are credited as stunt doubles for Cara Dune and Omera, respectively. "The Child" was performed by various puppeteers.

=== Filming and visual effects ===
Principal photography began in the first week of October 2018 in Southern California. Filming took place at the Manhattan Beach Studios in California under the working title Project Huckleberry, while also receiving a limited location filming in the area of Los Angeles. The series applies the StageCraft which was created with the intention of capturing the digital environments rendered on a video wall in real time in order to bring high quality images for the to final effects. Favreau expected the episode to be difficult to shoot due to the forest, the water, and the mech. He picked Howard believing she would not be intimidated by how hard the task was, and thought she did a great job. Pedro Pascal was not present during the filming of the episode due to previous commitments to King Lear on Broadway. Stunt actors filled in as body doubles onscreen while Pascal performed all of the vocal elements in post-production. Filming for the first season wrapped on February 27, 2019. Visual effects for the episode were created by Industrial Light & Magic (ILM), Base FX, ImagineEngine, MPC, Pixomondo, El Ranchito, Ghost FX, Hybride FX, and Important Looking Pirates. The development of the visual effects was supervised by Richard Bluff.

=== Music ===
A soundtrack album for the episode was released by digitally by Walt Disney Records on November 29, 2019, featuring Ludwig Göransson's score. On August 24, 2020, it was announced that Mondo would be releasing a limited edition for the complete score of the first season on vinyl edition, consisting of 8-CD discs for each episode with each one set pressed with a 180 Gram vinyl disc housed in it own jacked that features artwork by Paul Mann, while the box set is adorned with Mando's mudhorn Signet. The pre-orders for the soundtrack started on June 26, and finally released on December 15.

The Mandalorian: Chapter 4 (Original Score)
No.	Title	Length
1.	"The Ponds of Sorgan"	3:09
2.	"Off the Grid"	1:47
3.	"Can I Feed Him?"	3:34
4.	"Training the Plebs"	3:10
5.	"Camp Attack"	2:22
6.	"Spirit of the Woods"	5:10
7.	"Stay"	2:21
8.	"Mando Says Goodbye"	1:20
Total length:		22:53

== Reception ==
"Chapter 4: Sanctuary" received positive reviews. On Rotten Tomatoes, the episode holds an approval rating of 89% with an average rating of 7.5/10, based on 27 reviews. The website's critics consensus reads, "Under director Bryce Dallas Howard's deft guidance, "Sanctuary" scales down on big action-set pieces to find intimate character moments, exposing a deeper sense of humanity underneath The Mandalorian's metal suit."

Liz Shannon Miller of The A.V. Club gave the episode a grade A−, comparing it to Akira Kurosawa's Seven Samurai (1954), High Plains Drifter (1973), and Once Upon a Time in the West (1968). Miller wrote: "It's pretty impressive, how vigorously The Mandalorian is celebrating and incorporating classic Western tropes with each new episode, leaving no doubt whatsoever as to what creator Jon Favreau is trying to do here." She also praised the direction saying "episode director Bryce Dallas Howard makes sure that every beat is clean and precise, with an emotionally satisfying conclusion." Bryan Young of /Film compared the episode's plot to Seven Samurai. He praised Julia Jones, calling her a scene stealer, and praised Howard's direction. Young was critical of the music, calling it a near miss, as he did not feel it fit the tone of the episode. Tyler Hersko of IndieWire gave the episode a grade C+ and said the show had not "done much to subvert audience expectations" and was "still playing things safe, but that doesn't mean it isn't a consistently enjoyable affair." In particular, he praised the crew for bringing the AT-ST to life on the small screen, "its glowing red cockpit pierces the shadows like a monster's eyes in a horror film, and its janky, heavy movements make it truly seem like a terrifying war machine."

While writing a review for The Ringer, Ben Lindbergh stated that the episode "plays out like a cover version of Seven Samurai or The Magnificent Seven, except instead of seven ronin/gunfighters, there are only two", and praised the show for developing its plot point for the episodes though he lamented that the episodes for the series were becoming shorter than the previous one. Sean Keane while writing for CNET disliked that the main character was chattier in the episode in comparation to the previous ones but understood it by accepting "his love for Baby Yoda and fancying Omera will do that." Alan Sepinwall from the Rolling Stone considered to episode to have a cliched story and script though he appreciated the homage to the 50s and 60s with movies like Seven Samurai and The Magnificent Seven. He also praise the Favreau's screenplay and Howard's direction by managing to keep the episode entertaining and fun. Joe Skrebels rated the episode in IGN rated the episode with 7.5 out of 10 stating the Mandalorian continues to show "great strength continues to be in being able to fill out the quieter gaps in our understanding of the Star Wars universe, not push the galaxy's timeline along." He also considered the episode to be inferior to the previous three that were already released.

Gina Carano as Cara Dune received positive responses from fans and critics. Will Thorne of Variety praised her fighting skills and compared Cara Dune to Gamora from the Guardians of the Galaxy films. Joanna Robinson of Vanity Fair called the character a "prime showcase for Carano" and the first role to capitalize on her "real-life, distinct blend of inherent sweetness and physical toughness".

The way Grogu slurping bone broth ended Dune's and the Mandalorian's initial fight became an Internet meme.

=== Accolades ===
Award	Date of ceremony	Category	Recipient(s)	Result	Ref(s)
Primetime Creative Arts Emmy Awards	September 14–17 & 19, 2020	Outstanding Prosthetic Makeup for a Series, Limited Series, Movie or Special	Dana E. Glauberman and Dylan Firshein	Nominated	
American Cinema Editors Awards	April 17, 2021	Best Edited Drama Series for Non-Commercial Television	Dana E. Glauberman	Nominated	
