= Kuiil =

Fictional character in the Star Wars franchise

- Star Wars character
- Kuiil in an episode of The Mandalorian
- First appearance: "Chapter 1: The Mandalorian"; The Mandalorian; (2019)
- Last appearance: "Chapter 7: The Reckoning"; The Mandalorian; (2019)
- Created by: Jon Favreau
- Portrayed by: Misty Rosas
- Voiced by: Nick Nolte

In-universe information
- Species: Ugnaught
- Gender: Male
- Occupation: Moisture farmer; former Imperial slave

Kuiil is a fictional character in the Star Wars franchise who first appeared in the first season of the Disney+ television series The Mandalorian. An alien of the Ugnaught species, Kuiil is a former indentured servant of the Galactic Empire living in solitude when he encounters the show's title character and assists him in seeking and protecting a young alien known as "The Child".

Kuiil is portrayed as wise, patient, and hard-working, with a high level of mechanical skills and a gruff but ultimately kind-hearted personality. The voice of Kuiil was performed by Nick Nolte, who completed his recordings for all the character's dialogue in a single afternoon. Kuiil's performance was done by Misty Rosas, who during filming wore an animatronic face mask created by Legacy Effects.

Kuiil's face was brought to life through animatronics and puppetry, with its electronics and wires concealed in the backpack and pockets of Kuiil's costume. Three puppeteers controlled the mask's mouth and eyebrows off-camera as Rosas performed her scenes, attempting to match the character's facial movements to Nolte's vocal tracks. The process often proved challenging, particularly when the puppeteers missed signals made by Rosas during dimly-lit scenes.

Kuiil's dynamic with the bounty hunter droid IG-11 reflects a parenting theme prevalent among multiple characters throughout the first season of The Mandalorian, and Kuiil's reprogramming of the droid from hunter to protector drew nature versus nurture discussions among reviewers. Kuiil has been received positively by reviewers and fans alike. He has been described as a fan favorite, with several reviews calling him the best character on the show, and his signature line "I have spoken" became one of the better-known and best-liked lines of dialogue from the series.

== Appearances ==
Kuiil is an alien of the Ugnaught species. According to his backstory established in exposition dialogue on The Mandalorian, Kuiil was sold into indentured servitude to the Galactic Empire and spent many years working for them against his will before the events of the television series. At one point in the show, Kuiil says he worked in the gene farms of a cloning facility during his time with the Empire. He eventually worked hard enough to pay off his debt and earn his freedom, and then sought a reclusive home on a quiet world where he would no longer have to work for anyone else again. Kuiil appeared in three episodes in the first season of The Mandalorian, making his first appearance in the series debut episode "Chapter 1: The Mandalorian", where he is shown living on a moisture farm on the planet Arvala-7, working as a vapor farmer.

In that episode, Kuiil encounters the show's title character, a bounty hunter known as the Mandalorian, who is seeking to collect a bounty on an unnamed person being held on the planet. Kuiil assists the Mandalorian when he is attacked by creatures known as blurrgs. He welcomes the Mandalorian into his home, where Kuiil informs him that several other bounty hunters and mercenaries have passed through Arvala-7 in search of the Mandalorian's target. Kuiil offers to help the bounty hunter travel to the compound where the asset is being kept, with the hope that once the bounty has been collected, peace will once again be restored to Arvala-7. Kuiil teaches the Mandalorian how to ride one of the captured blurrgs so he can travel to the compound.

Kuiil appears in the next episode, "Chapter 2: The Child when the Mandalorian returns to him with the target he had been seeking: a young alien creature referred to as "The Child". Kuiil helps the Mandalorian avert a crisis with a group of alien scavengers called Jawas. After the Jawas steal necessary parts from the Mandalorian's ship, the Razor Crest, Kuiil helps arranges a trade meeting between them, which Kuiil assures the Mandalorian is the best way to regain the necessary parts to repair his ship. Kuiil helps foster a deal in which the Jawas will return the parts if the Mandalorian collects for them an egg from a dangerous nearby creature called a mudhorn, which the Mandalorian does. After collecting the parts, Kuiil spends several days helping the Mandalorian repair the Razor Crest. Afterward, the Mandalorian offers to share some of the reward he will receive for collecting the bounty on the Child, but Kuiil refuses. The Mandalorian also offers for Kuiil to accompany him off-planet and work for him, but Kuiil declines this request as well, preferring his peaceful life on Arvala-7, and wishing to never work for anyone else ever again due to his past with the Empire.

Kuiil reappears in the show's penultimate episode, "Chapter 7: The Reckoning, in which the Mandalorian returns to Arvala-7 with his ally Cara Dune. They seek Kuiil's help in protecting the Child during a mission on the planet Nevarro to eliminate an Imperial presence there. It is revealed that after the Mandalorian left Arvala-7, Kuiil found and rebuilt the bounty hunter droid IG-11, whom the Mandalorian had destroyed while rescuing the Child. After a lengthy process of retraining IG-11 to walk and operate again, Kuiil reprogrammed him to be a nurse droid and protector, rather than a hunter. Kuiil assigns IG-11 to protect the Child, and agrees to accompany the Mandalorian to help protect the Child from imperial slavery, under the condition that he bring along IG-11 and his blurrgs. On their way to the planet, Kuiil witnesses the Child use the Force to choke Cara after mistaking her for a threat. While the others in the party do not understand his power, Kuiil advises them about rumors he has heard about the Force. During their journey on Nevarro, Cara and the Mandalorian's party are attacked by a group of giant winged creatures, which they repel after losing several of the blurrgs. Later, experiencing a change of heart after the Child saves his life, the bounty hunter Greef Karga reveals the mission is an ambush, after which the Mandalorian is to be killed and the Child given over to the Imperials. Cara, the Mandalorian, and Greef instead devise a new plan: they will leave the Child behind, bring the Mandalorian to the Imperials as if he is a prisoner, and then eliminate them.

At the Mandalorian's request, Kuiil agrees to take the Child back to the Razor Crest on his blurrg while the Mandalorian, Cara, and Greef attempt to eliminate the Imperials. When Imperial leader Moff Gideon later traps the Mandalorian and his party, the bounty hunter contacts Kuiil and urges him to hurry back to the ship and lock it down for the Child's protection, but two Imperial Scout Troopers on speeder bikes intercept the message and rush to stop Kuiil. Kuiil rides his blurrg as fast as possible and nearly reaches the Razor Crest, but he is shot and killed by the troopers, who then take the Child. In the season finale "Chapter 8: Redemption", Kuiil is not seen, but the Mandalorian returns to bury him, creating a makeshift tombstone with Kuiil's helmet resting atop a bed of rocks.

== Characterization ==
Kuiil values the peace and tranquility he has established on Arvala-7, as shown by his willingness to assist the Mandalorian and other bounty hunters travel in finding the bounty they seek. He believes doing so will help maintain the peace, and that getting the asset off the planet will restore tranquility to Arvala-7. Kuiil's history of servitude to the Empire means he strongly values his freedom and independence, and he has no desire to work for anyone again other than himself, as demonstrated by his rejection of the Mandalorian's offer of employment. Kuill has worked hard to get away from his past and forge a new life for himself. Corey Plante of Inverse wrote: "There's something admirable about Kuiil's values here. He's a humble, salt-of-the-earth character who doesn't bother contemplating any sense of morality; he knows what he wants out of life, and every choice he makes furthers that end." However, although Kuiil tries to avoid conflict at all costs, he does not hesitate to help those in need. He has a strong sense of honor, and believes in doing the right thing, as illustrated by his willingness to risk his safety and hard-won freedom to help the Child. The value he places on freedom due to his experience factors into his determination to protect the Child from the Empire.

Kuiil speaks directly and without hesitation, using few words and often cutting off any further argument or response by stating: "I have spoken." Actress Misty Rosas, who delivered the performance of Kuiil, said she does not believe the line is meant to be arrogant or disrespectful, but rather speaks to Kuiil's philosophy on life: "He just simplifies everything in life, and is just like: 'I have spoken. You know, we're done talking about this. Don't complicate it, don't overthink it.'" Nevertheless, Kuiil's terse manner of speaking has resulted in reviewers describing him as both friendly, and grumpy, though he is ultimately kind-hearted beneath his sometimes rough exterior. as demonstrated by the compassion he shows for both IG-11 and the Child. Plante wrote: "He comes across as deeply rational and admirable, even if many people might mistake him for a bit of a jerk."

Kuiil is extremely hard-working, with a high level of mechanical skills, and craftsmanship. He is very resourceful, and highly proficient with technology, as demonstrated by his ability to repair IG-11 and the Razor Crest. Kuiil is very intelligent, offering wisdom and guidance to visitors on Arvala-7. He has lived a long time, and has seen and experienced many terrible things as a result of his past as an indentured servant, instilling a hardened world-weariness in him. Cautious, stoic, and patient, Kuiil presents a calm and composed temperament even in the face of the Mandalorian's occasional impatience. Kuiil is also a teacher, as he shows when he teaches the Mandalorian how to ride a blurrg, and teaches IG-11 how to walk and operate again following his reprogramming. This shows Kuiil's penchant for patience and affirmation, which Megan Crouse of Den of Geek writes is "the core of his character and part of what makes him so delightful". His patience is further demonstrated by his willingness to spend multiple days helping the Mandalorian repair his ship. Although the Mandalorian has trouble trusting anybody throughout the series, Kuiil earns his trust.

Like all Ugnaughts, Kuiil has pink skin, white hair, upturned noses, and thick layers of jowls. He has a low, guttural voice that at times sounds like a raspy growl.

== Concept and creation ==
=== Conception ===
Kuiil was created as an original character for The Mandalorian, a live-action Star Wars television series that debuted on the Disney+ streaming service on November 12, 2019. Concept art was prepared for the character during pre-production, including an image by Christian Alzmann of Kuiil and the Mandalorian riding blurrgs alongside each other, and another by Jama Jurabaev of Kuiil and the Mandalorian at his moisture farm. Ugnaughts had first appeared in The Empire Strikes Back (1980) as workers on Cloud City, and reappeared in the sequel film Return of the Jedi (1983). They have also been featured on the television shows Star Wars: The Clone Wars, Star Wars Rebels, and Star Wars Resistance, as well as various Star Wars novels. The character of Kuiil was first publicly announced on October 28 with the release of a character poster of The Mandalorian solely featuring the character. The first footage of Kuiil was shown in a trailer for The Mandalorian released on November 6, 2019, less than a week before the show debuted. The trailer included a brief clip of Kuiil, as well as a small amount of dialogue from the forthcoming show, in which he said he has never met a Mandalorian before but has heard stories about them.

=== Portrayals ===
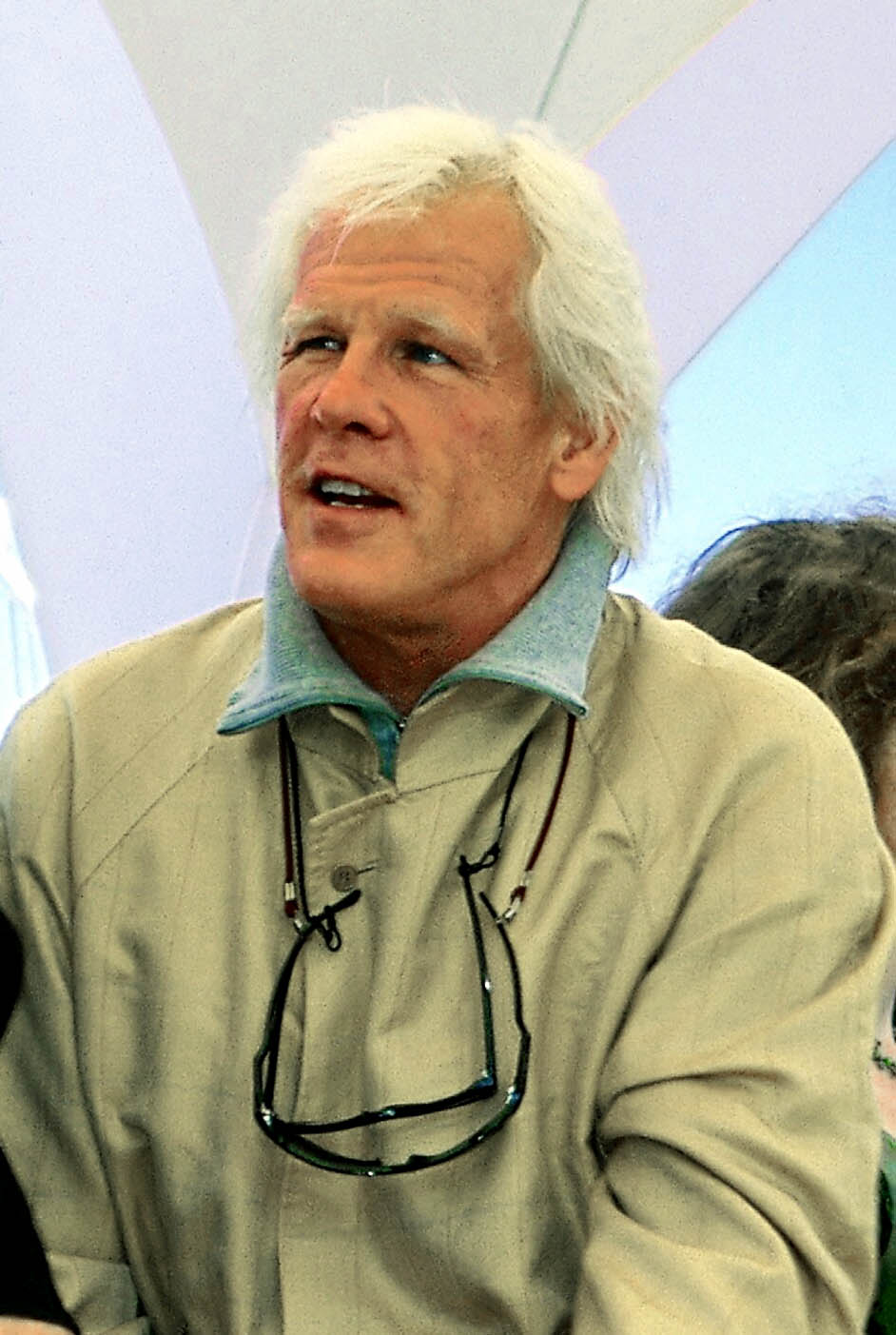
Veteran actor Nick Nolte performed the voice of Kuiil.

The voice of Kuiil was performed by veteran actor Nick Nolte. Nolte was seriously considered for the role of Han Solo in the original Star Wars (1977) film, losing out to Harrison Ford. In a 2011 interview, eight years before the release of The Mandalorian, Nolte said he would have been "kind of a goofy Star Wars guy" if he had been cast. Nolte completed his vocal performances for all of Kuiil's dialogue in The Mandalorian in a single afternoon session over the course of multiple hours. Although the news had leaked on the internet earlier, Nolte's casting was officially announced on November 30, 2018, though the character he would be portraying was not initially revealed. He was the third cast member publicly confirmed for the series, after Pedro Pascal and Gina Carano.

Actress and stuntwoman Misty Rosas provided the physical performance for Kuiil, calling it "the most amazing job of my life". Rosas had a cold reading audition for the part in the summer of 2018, though she arranged via her agent to come in early and briefly review the script and familiarize herself with the material. Rosas, who was born with 65% hearing loss in her right ear, was having problems with her hearing at the time and had an appointment with an ear doctor just hours before the audition. She was nervous that these problems would negatively impact her audition and that she would be forced to read lips, which she fears would "[take her] out of the scene".

Among the dialogue Rosas recited during her audition was Kuiil's signature line, "I have spoken", and she believed the producers studied her delivery of this line to gauge her understanding of the character. Rosas felt an immediate connection with the character based on her own life experiences, saying: "I know what it is to fight for your freedom." Rosas also said she related to the character's wise and thoughtful personality due to her regular practice of yoga.

=== Costume ===
Kuiil's face was brought to life through the use of animatronics and puppetry, with a head mask that was created by Legacy Effects, a shop of prosthetic makeup experts started by Stan Winston. The face itself was a foam latex mask that Rosas also wore for the part. The mouth and eyebrows were controlled by three puppeteers off-camera as Misty Rosas delivered her performances. The electronics from the face mask's animatronics were concealed inside a backpack Kuiil wears throughout the show, and concealed wires ran along the back of Rosas' neck from the backpack into the mask. The wires were spread apart to give Rosas the greatest possible freedom of motion. Batteries for the mask was concealed inside the pockets of Kuiil's costume. As a result of all the machinery, the mask was physically heavy and placed a great deal of pressure on Rosas' shoulder, neck, back, and core stability. However, Rosas said the weight of the costume ultimately aided her performance, since it helped her portray Kuiil's advanced age and slow walking speed.

Kuiil's eyes are not part of the mask, and instead, Rosas' actual eyes with contacts are visible. Unlike some costumes Rosas has worn in past performances, she was able to see clearly while filming, but it was occasionally difficult to breathe because her mouth was far back within the mask. She occasionally needed to ask crew members to open the mouth of the mask for her between takes so she could breathe more freely. Some reviewers have noted that Kuiil's mask appears to have been designed to resemble Nick Nolte's face.

=== Filming ===
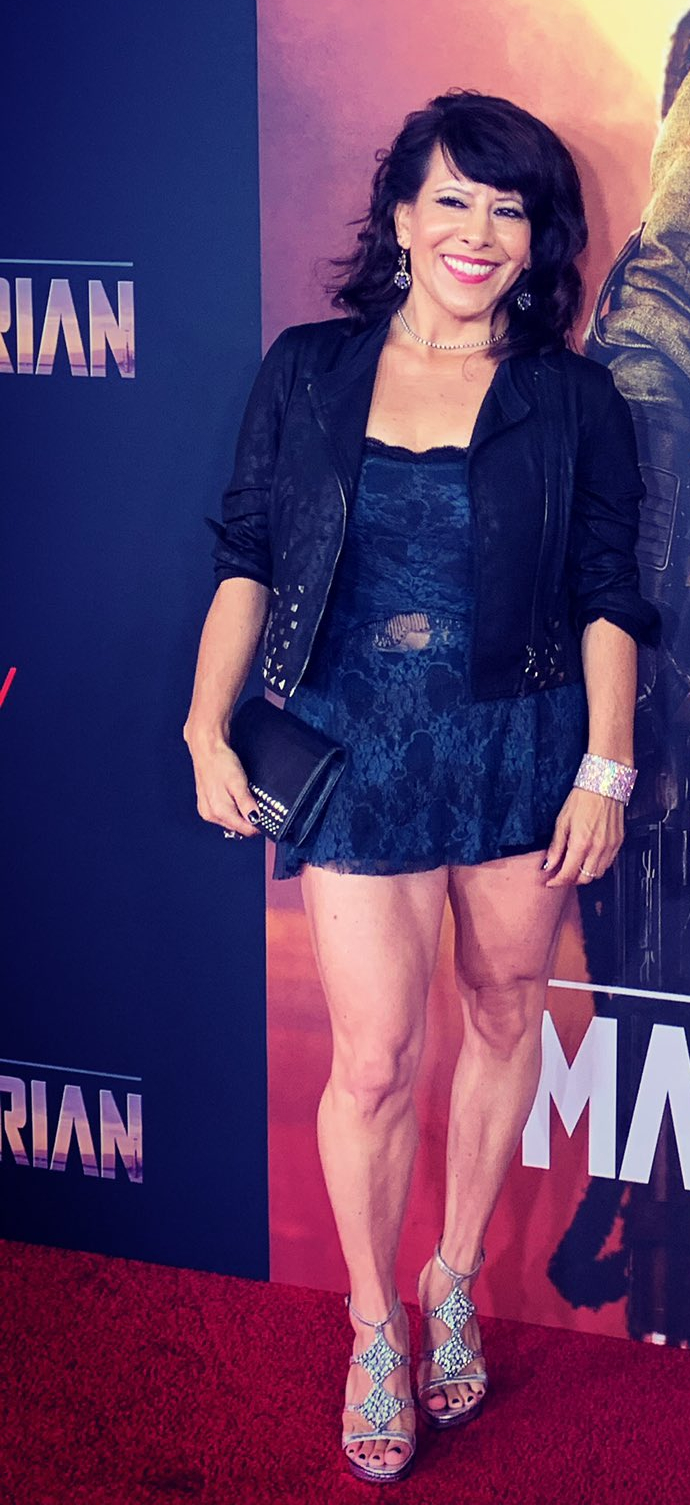
The performance of Kuiil was done by actress and stuntwoman Misty Rosas.

Before scenes involving Kuiil were filmed, the cast and crew of The Mandalorian held private rehearsals with actress Misty Rosas in which she did not wear the costume. Jon Favreau, creator and showrunner of the series, attended these rehearsals, in which they would attempt to determine the rhythm and timing of each scene. Rosas called the rehearsals "the most nerve-wracking for me". Nick Nolte recorded dialogue for Kuiil before the character's live-action scenes were filmed, providing multiple takes with different performances and vocal inclinations for the crew to choose from. Rosas felt Nolte's voice work for Kuiil was "beautiful". The recordings would not be available until the mornings of filming, so Rosas prepared a great deal in advance for her scenes, studying the dialogue carefully, so that shooting would go as smoothly as possible.

Once the dialogue was ready, Rosas and other members of the crew, including the episode's director, would listen to the various recordings, arrange the chosen recordings, and prepare to shoot the scenes. It was complicated and often difficult for the puppeteers to match Kuiil's facial movements to Nolte's vocal tracks during filming; Misty said of the process: "We were so proud and we wanted it so bad, so we really, really focused and worked really hard." Scenes with a large amount of dialogue from Kuiil were particularly difficult. Rosas and the puppeteers prepared extensively to ensure their efforts were coordinated, and during filming, she would provide them a non-verbal signal to indicate when she was about to act out a line of dialogue so they could operate the mask. Occasionally the puppeteers would miss her signals, particularly during scenes that were dimly lit, and multiple takes were necessary as a result.

Kuiil often holds the Child during his scenes in "Chapter 7: The Reckoning", which is a puppet prop filled with animatronics. This made the Child relatively heavy, which occasionally proved challenging for Rosas, who also had to manage the weight of the animatronics in her costume. One full day of filming the episode focused upon Kuiil riding the blurrg, a process Rosas described as "intense" due to the amount of time she spent on the fake creature and the speeds at which it was made to appear to run. The process was made further challenging because she was carrying the heavy animatronic Child prop throughout the scenes, and she occasionally needed breaks between takes. Rosas said: "My legs are not exactly long, so I was squeezing for dear life and holding the baby." However, Rosas was able to place the weight of her animatronics-filled backpack on the saddle of the blurrg while filming the scenes, which helped relieve pressure on her shoulders, neck, and back.

While the closing credits music for The Mandalorian is usually fairly upbeat, a slower and sadder composition was used for "Chapter 7: The Reckoning" because the credits immediately followed Kuiil's death in the final scene.

== Themes ==
The dynamic between Kuiil and IG-11 reflects a childrearing theme that is prevalent among multiple characters throughout the first season of The Mandalorian. The two have a relationship similar to that of a father and son, as demonstrated in the scene in which Kuiil teaches IG-11 how to operate and function after the droid is reprogrammed. This dynamic is similar to the one shared by the Mandalorian and the child throughout the season. The Kuiil and IG-11 scenes also demonstrate that how the "child" character is raised makes a significant difference in whether the child becomes an asset or a threat to those around him. The droid was a dangerous assassin before Kuiil reprogrammed him, but thanks to the Ugnaught's parenting, he becomes a protector and helper instead. This, too, is similar to the relationship between the Mandalorian and the Child. For example, the scene in which the Child uses the Force to choke Cara Dune shows that the Child has the potential for evil if he is not properly guided by his "parent".

Kuiil's reprogramming of IG-11 raises nature versus nurture themes in The Mandalorian. Even after IG-11 is reprogrammed, the Mandalorian does not believe he has truly changed, because he believes droids have an essential nature and that IG-11's nature remains murderous and untrustworthy. But in reprogramming IG-11, Kuiil nurtures him and helps him to change; Kuiil feels that in the process of learning how to function again, IG-11 gained a new personality. Kuiil insists to the Mandalorian: "Droids are not good or bad — they are neutral reflections of those who program them." Keith Phipps of Vulture wrote of IG-11 and the nature versus nurture theme: "He's not bad. He's just programmed that way, and with care and change he can do a lot of good in the world."

Additionally, Leo Holman of Comic Book Resources said the character of Kuiil raises questions about the Galactic Empire that have never before been considered in Star Wars. The fact that Kuiil had been an indentured servant for the Empire invites the question of whether this is a prevalent type of Imperial practice: "It makes you wonder, how many of the characters we see in the background working for the Empire in various other Star Wars movies and media, are there against their will working towards freedom?" Additionally, the fact that Kuiil ultimately pays off his debt and buys his freedom raises the further question about whether species enslaved by the Empire can eventually earn their freedom through hard work, a concept that had never been featured in any other Star Wars media before The Mandalorian.

== Cultural impact ==
=== Critical reception ===
Kuiil has been received positively by reviewers and fans alike. He has been described as a fan favorite, and several reviews have called him the best character on the show. His line "I have spoken" became one of the better-known and best-liked lines of dialogue from the series, and has been the subject of internet memes used by fans. Screen Rant Writer Kiki Evans called it one of the "most iconic phrases" from the series. Leo Holman of Comic Book Resources declared Kuiil The Mandalorian's best character, writing: "At first glance, [Kuiil] seemed like a throwaway character, but with every line of dialogue the character spoke, he became more and more interesting and helped shine a light on parts of the Star Wars universe that have never been explored." Charlie Ridgely of Comicbook.com described Kuiil as "one of the most memorable additions to the Star Wars canon in recent years". Space.com writer Scott Snowden called Kuiil one of the best characters on the show, describing him as quirky, interesting, and "beautifully portrayed", and particularly praising the level of detail and animatronic control in his facial expressions. Corey Plante of Inverse called Kuiil "the best and most under-appreciated character" on the show, and said that he felt the choice to make a member of a little-known Star Wars species such an important element of the show made the franchise feel larger and richer. He wrote: "Star Wars is better because Kuiil exists."

Mustafa Gatollari of Distractify called Kuiil one of the best parts of The Mandalorian, and praised the show for implementing the Ugnaught species, a previously minor element of Star Wars, in such an effective way. Q.V. Hough of Screen Rant described Kuiil's character arc as "heroic" and said the character is "bound to be remembered by fans as one of the season's best characters". Den of Geek writer Megan Crouse said that she felt the character was a wise old mentor trope, but that this worked well, in part due to Kuiil's likable personality and the strong performances of Nolte and Rosas. Crouse wrote: "He's the Obi-Wan Kenobi, and, right now, that's okay." Noah Howell of Niner Times called Kuiil his favorite character on the show, saying his humble and unassuming nature "instantly made me fall in love with him". He compared the dynamic of Kuill and the Mandalorian to that of Luke Skywalker and Yoda in the original Star Wars trilogy. Ana Dumaraog felt Kuiil's death was unfortunate, but well-handled by the show. Forbes writer Erik Kain liked that Kuiil was not abandoned after his initial episodes and instead returned to play a major part in the final episodes of the season. Mike Hale of The New York Times said Nick Nolte provided a "nicely acerbic voice" for the character.

Screen Rant ranked Kuiil seventh on its list of the best characters from the first season of The Mandalorian, and fifth on a separate list of the most interesting characters from the season. When Kuiil was killed in "Chapter 7: The Reckoning", the episode ended on a shot of his unconscious body. Fans on the internet expressed hope that it would be revealed in the next episode that he had survived, or that IG-11 or another character would revive him, before his death was confirmed on-screen. Some fans have speculated that the Mandalorian may eventually give the Child the name Kuiil in memory of the Ugnaught.

=== Merchandise ===
A Funko Pop figurine of Kuiil was announced on December 31, 2019. In 2021, Hasbro and Hot Toys released a figurine depicting Kuiil while riding a blurrg and its credit collection.
