= Chapter 15: The Believer =

- The Mandalorian episode
- Episode no.: Season 2 Episode 7
- Directed by: Rick Famuyiwa
- Written by: Rick Famuyiwa
- Cinematography by: Matthew Jensen
- Editing by: Jeff Seibenick
- Original release date: December 11, 2020
- Running time: 35 minutes

Co-starring
- Bill Burr as Migs Mayfeld; Gina Carano as Cara Dune; Temuera Morrison as Boba Fett; Ming-Na Wen as Fennec Shand; Giancarlo Esposito as Moff Gideon; Richard Brake as Valin Hess

Episode chronology
← Previous "Chapter 14: The Tragedy"	Next → "Chapter 16: The Rescue"
- The Mandalorian season 2

"Chapter 15: The Believer" is the seventh episode of the second season of the American television series The Mandalorian. It was written and directed by Rick Famuyiwa. It was released on Disney+ on December 11, 2020 and received generally positive reviews, particularly for Burr's performance and the emotional weight.

== Plot ==
Prisoner Migs Mayfeld is working on the Karthon Chop Fields and is remanded into the custody of Marshal Cara Dune. The Mandalorian needs Mayfeld, a former Imperial soldier, to acquire the coordinates to Moff Gideon's ship. Mayfeld directs them to a hidden Imperial rhydonium refinery on Morak. As all the others are known to Imperial security, the Mandalorian must accompany Mayfeld into the refinery to access a terminal and steal the coordinates. Mayfeld and the Mandalorian hijack one of the transports and disguise themselves as soldiers. The highly explosive rhydonium shipments are attacked by pirates, and the Mandalorian is almost overwhelmed fighting them off. Two Imperial TIE fighters swoop in and kill the pirates as they reach the facility, the only transport to survive.

The terminal Mayfeld needs is in the officer's mess hall, but Mayfeld sees his former commanding officer, Valin Hess, and fears being recognized. The Mandalorian goes instead but the terminal requires a facial scan, forcing him to remove his helmet and break the "Way of the Mandalorian" creed that he lives by to acquire the codes. He is confronted by Hess, but Mayfeld intervenes. After a tense drink where Hess callously dismisses the Imperial soldiers and civilians who died in Operation Cinder, (Note: A series of Imperial reprisal attacks following the death of Emperor Palpatine, introduced in the 2015 Marvel Comics miniseries Shattered Empire.) an angered Mayfeld shoots him dead. Mayfeld and the Mandalorian fight their way to the roof, while Fennec Shand and Dune provide covering fire, and Boba Fett arrives aboard Slave I. Mayfeld destroys the refinery with a well-placed sniper shot. The ship is pursued by two TIE fighters, but Fett obliterates them using a seismic charge. Dune lets Mayfeld go free as thanks for his aid, and the Mandalorian sends Moff Gideon a threatening message, vowing to rescue Grogu.

== Production ==
=== Development ===
The episode was written and directed by Rick Famuyiwa.

Phil Tippett and his team used stop motion animation for the "scrapwalkers" shown in the background of the Karthon Chop Fields scene. Director of photography Matthew Jensen explained the Chop Fields were a mix of the LED video wall of "the Volume" and built set, but that the eye cannot easily distinguish what is real and what is not. The prison droid was performed by an actor in a motion capture suit which was replaced using CGI. The scrapwalker miniatures were filmed and then projected on the video wall. Visual effects supervisor Richard Bluff, and his team created miniatures of the wrecked TIE Fighters which were scanned and projected as part of the background.

=== Casting ===
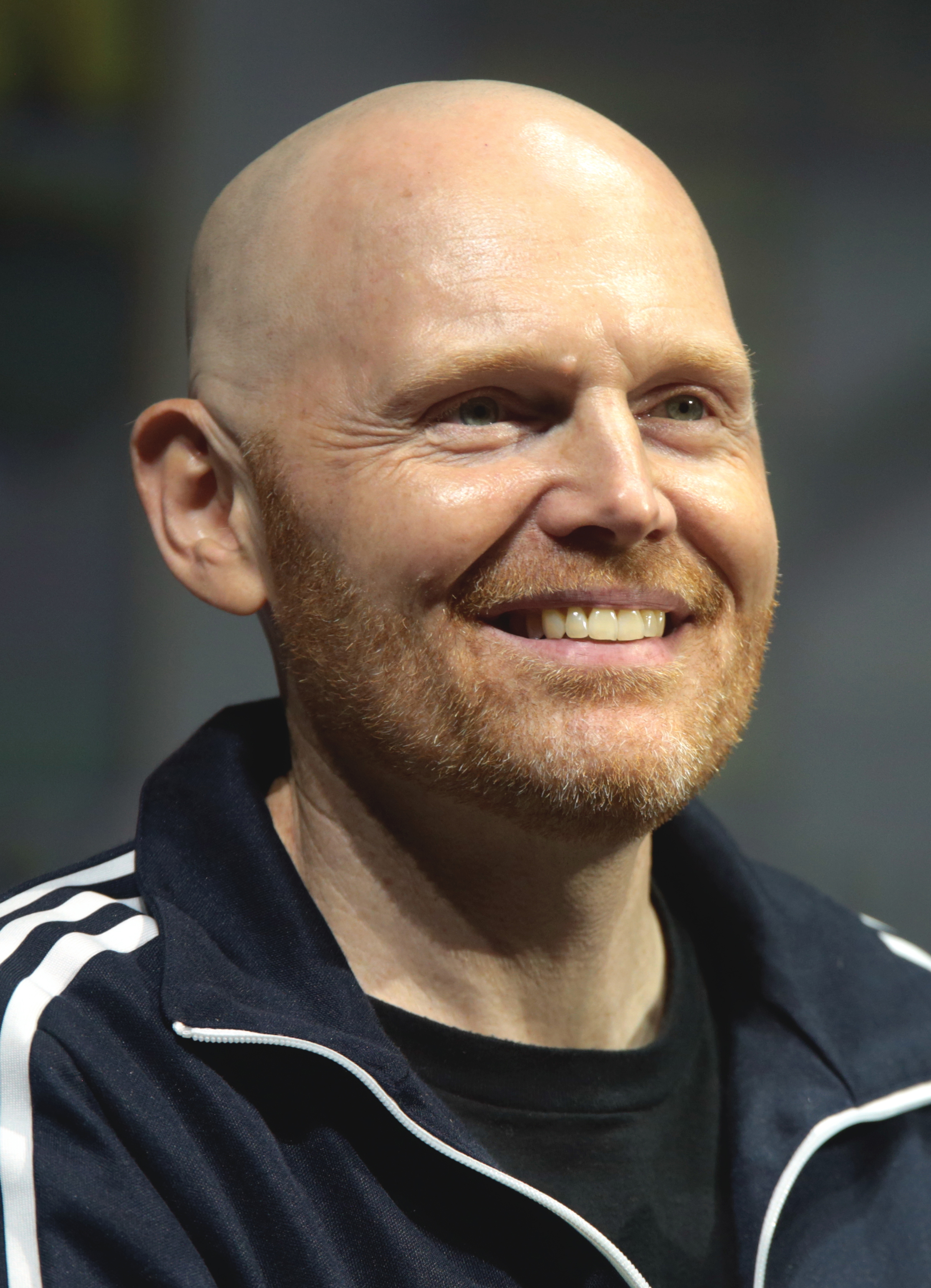
Bill Burr returns as Migs Mayfeld, a former Imperial sharpshooter.

The co-starring actors cast for this episode are all returning from previous episodes, and include Bill Burr as Migs Mayfeld, Gina Carano as Cara Dune, Temuera Morrison as Boba Fett, Ming-Na Wen as Fennec Shand, and Giancarlo Esposito as Moff Gideon. This is the first episode of the series not to feature Grogu.

Additional guest starring actors cast for this episode include Donald Mills as the voice of a security droid, Gabriel Ebert returning as an Imperial Gunner Officer, Miguel A. Lopez as a juggernaut pilot, Barry Lowin as a shoretrooper, Katy O'Brian returning as an Imperial Comms Officer, and Richard Brake as Valin Hess. Lateef Crowder, Brendan Wayne, and Barry Lowin are credited as stunt doubles for the Mandalorian. Amy Sturdivant, Chad Bennett, and Dane Farwell are credited as stunt doubles for Cara Dune, Migs Mayfeld, and Valin Hess, respectively.

=== Music ===
Ludwig Göransson composed the musical score for the episode. The featured tracks were released on December 18, 2020, in the second volume of the season two soundtrack.

== Reception ==
On Rotten Tomatoes, the episode has a score of 89% based on reviews from 44 critics, with an average rating of 7.8/10. The website's critics consensus reads: ""The Believer" curbs the season's momentum going into the finale to mixed results, providing some of the most illuminating and frustrating moments of the series so far."

Keith Phipps of Vulture gave the episode 4 out of 5 and wrote: "That world becomes a richer, more compelling place to tell stories when Star Wars acknowledges that not everything can be categorized into Light and Dark." Katie Rife of The A.V. Club gave the episode a B+ and wrote, "This was really Bill Burr's week to shine" and "As far as detours go, this was a thought-provoking one." Ben Travers of IndieWire gave the episode a grade of B, and praised writer-director Rick Famuyiwa. Travers was impressed by the pirate fight, and loved the camerawork, but also the moral conversation, saying Famuyiwa "delivers an exciting adventure through the dark side and a convincing enough lesson in cultural relativism."

Reviewers compared the transporting of highly explosive cargo to the French film The Wages of Fear (1953), and William Friedkin's Sorcerer (1977).
