= List of Star Wars species =

These are lists of sentient species from the Star Wars franchise.

- List of Star Wars species (A–E)
- List of Star Wars species (F–J)
- List of Star Wars species (K–O)
- List of Star Wars species (P–T)
- List of Star Wars species (U–Z)
