= Dana E. Glauberman =

American film editor

- Born: Los Angeles, California
- Education: University of California, Santa Barbara (B.A. 1990)
- Occupation: Film editor
- Years active: 1992–present

Dana E. Glauberman, ACE, is an American film and television editor. She is known for her work on films such as Juno, Up in the Air, Draft Day and Ghostbusters: Afterlife, as well as TV series such as The Mandalorian and Ahsoka.

== Early life and education ==
Glauberman was born and raised in Los Angeles, CA, and as a child, she enjoyed jigsaw puzzles. She attended the University of California, Santa Barbara originally interested in photography, but took a film production class which introduced her to film editing, a career she considered very similar to her childhood jigsaw puzzles. She graduated with a B.A. in film studies in December 1990.

== Cinema career ==
Her first job after graduating college was as a Post Production Assistant at Hearst Entertainment. She refined her skills as an assistant editor on television shows, such as Dr. Quinn, Medicine Woman and Northern Exposure, and feature films, including The Birdcage, Road Trip, and Pirates of the Caribbean: The Curse of the Black Pearl. She also worked as an additional editor on a few films, most notably director Mark Waters and writer Tina Fey's Mean Girls.

Glauberman has garnered considerable recognition for her work as an editor, receiving five ACE Eddie Award nominations, a BAFTA Award nomination, a Primetime Emmy Award nomination, a Critics' Choice Award nomination, an HPA Award nomination, and three “Editor of the Year” accolades, two from Hamilton's Behind the Camera Awards and one from the Hollywood Film Awards.

Glauberman is a member of American Cinema Editors, the Academy of Motion Picture Arts and Sciences, BAFTA, and the Academy of Television Arts & Sciences.

== Selected filmography ==
Year	Title	Contribution	Note
2027	The Beekeeper 2	Editor	Feature film, upcoming
2025	Karate Kid: Legends	Editor	Feature film
2023	Ahsoka	Editor	3 episodes
2022	The Book of Boba Fett	Editor	2 episodes
2021	Ghostbusters: Afterlife	Editor	Feature film
2019	The Mandalorian	Editor	2 episodes
2018	Creed II	Editor	Feature film
2017	Father Figures	Editor	Feature film
2017	Counterpart	Editor	4 episodes
2016	War Dogs	Additional Editor	Feature film
2015	Casual	Editor	5 episodes
2014	Men, Women & Children	Editor	Feature film
2014	Draft Day	Editor	Feature film
2013	Labor Day	Editor	Feature film
2012	The Guilt Trip	Editor	Feature film
2011	Young Adult	Editor	Feature film
2011	No Strings Attached	Editor	Feature film
2009	Love Happens	Editor	Feature film
2009	Up in the Air	Editor	Feature film
2007	Juno	Editor	Feature film
2005	Thank You for Smoking	Editor	Feature film

== Awards and nominations ==
Year	Result	Award	Category	Work	Ref.
2024	Nominated	Hollywood Professional Association	Outstanding Editing – Episode or Non-Theatrical Feature (Over 30 Minutes)	Ahsoka - Fallen Jedi	
2023	Nominated	American Cinema Editors	Best Edited Drama Series for Non-Commercial Television	Ahsoka - Fallen Jedi	
2021	Nominated	American Cinema Editors	Best Edited Drama Series for Non-Commercial Television	The Mandalorian - "Chapter 4: Sanctuary"	
2020	Nominated	Primetime Emmy Awards	Outstanding Picture Editing for a Drama Series	The Mandalorian - "Chapter 4: Sanctuary"	
2018	Nominated	Hollywood Professional Association	Outstanding Editing - Television (over 30 minutes)	Counterpart - The Crossing	
2012	Nominated	American Cinema Editors	Best Edited Feature Film – Comedy or Musical	Young Adult	
2010	Nominated	Critics' Choice Movie Awards	Best Editing	Up in the Air	
2010	Nominated	BAFTA Film Awards	Best Editing	Up in the Air	
2010	Nominated	American Cinema Editors	Best Edited Feature Film – Dramatic	Up in the Air	
2009	Won	Hollywood Film Awards	Editor of the Year	Up in the Air	
2008	Nominated	American Cinema Editors	Best Edited Feature Film – Comedy or Musical	Juno	
2007	Nominated	American Cinema Editors	Best Edited Feature Film – Comedy or Musical	Thank You for Smoking	

== See also ==
- List of film director and editor collaborations
