= Richard Bluff =

English visual effects supervisor

Richard Bluff is an English visual effects supervisor. Known for his works in Disney's visual effects company Industrial Light & Magic (ILM) as a digital matte artist and visual effects supervisor in acclaimed films such as Star Wars: Episode III – Revenge of the Sith (2005), The Island (2005), Transformers (2007–11), Indiana Jones and the Kingdom of the Crystal Skull (2008), Star Trek (2009), Avatar (2009), The Avengers (2012), Cloud Atlas (2012) Pacific Rim (2013), The Big Short (2015) and Doctor Strange (2016), for which he received an Academy Award for Best Visual Effects nomination at the 89th Academy Awards. He previously worked at Blur Studio as digital artist.

== Awards and nomination ==
- Nominated: Academy Award for Best Visual Effects - Doctor Strange
- Nominated: BAFTA Award for Best Special Visual Effects - Doctor Strange
- Nominated: Satellite Award for Best Visual Effects - Doctor Strange
- Nominated: Visual Effects Society Award for Outstanding Visual Effects in an Effects Driven Feature Motion Picture - Doctor Strange
