= Baz Idoine =

New Zealand cinematographer

- Born: Barry Idoine
- Occupation: Cinematographer
- Years active: 2014–present

Barry Idoine is a New Zealand cinematographer. He won a Primetime Emmy Award and was nominated for another one in the category Outstanding Cinematography for his work on the television program The Mandalorian.
