= Colin Wilson (film producer) =

British born producer and unit production manager; operations manager

- Occupations: Film producer; executive producer; unit production manager
- Years active: 1978–present

Colin Wilson is an American film producer, executive producer, and unit production manager. He is best known for producing the films Casper (1995), The Lost World: Jurassic Park (1997), Amistad (1997), Lara Croft: Tomb Raider (2001), Terminator 3: Rise of the Machines (2003), Troy (2004), War of the Worlds (2005), Munich (2005), John Carter (2012), and The Meg (2018).

Wilson began his career as an assistant editor, working on the first three installments of the Superman film series (1978–1983). He worked his way up to executive producer for films such as Avatar (2009), Zero Dark Thirty (2012), and Suicide Squad (2016). Wilson also produced shows like The Mandalorian (2019–2023), which earned him a nomination for the Primetime Emmy Award for Outstanding Drama Series in 2020 and again in 2021. His more recent works have been Ahsoka and Skeleton Crew.

== Filmography ==
Film producer roles are sourced from Fandango.

=== Film Producer Roles ===
Year	Film	Credit
1993	Jurassic Park	Associate producer
1994	The Flintstones	Co-producer
1995	Casper	Producer
1997	The Lost World: Jurassic Park	Producer
1997	Amistad	Producer
1998	Small Soldiers	Producer
1999	The Haunting	Producer
2001	Lara Croft: Tomb Raider	Producer
2003	Terminator 3: Rise of the Machines	Producer
2004	Troy	Producer
2005	War of the Worlds	Producer
2005	Munich	Producer
2009	Avatar	Executive producer
2012	John Carter	Producer
2012	Zero Dark Thirty	Executive producer
2016	Pelé: Birth of a Legend	Producer
2016	Suicide Squad	Executive producer
2017	Detroit	Producer
2017	Mark Felt: The Man Who Brought Down the White House	Executive producer
2018	The Meg	Producer
2023	Turandot	Co-producer
2023	Meg 2: The Trench	Producer

=== Television Producer Roles ===
Year	Title	Credit	Notes
2000	Maurice Béjart's Nutcracker	Producer	Television film
2019−23	The Mandalorian	Executive producer	
2021−22	The Book of Boba Fett	Executive producer	
2023−present	Ahsoka	Executive producer	
2024−25	Skeleton Crew	Executive producer	

=== Editorial Department ===
Year	Film	Role
1978	Superman	Assistant editor
1980	Superman II	Assistant editor
1981	Raiders of the Lost Ark	Assistant film editor
1983	Superman III	Assistant editor
1984	Indiana Jones and the Temple of Doom	Assistant film editor
1987	Empire of the Sun	Associate editor
1988	Who Framed Roger Rabbit	Associate editor: United Kingdom
1989	Indiana Jones and the Last Crusade	Associate editor
1989	Always	Associate editor

=== Production Manager ===
Year	Film	Role
2009	Avatar	Unit production manager
2012	Zero Dark Thirty	Unit production manager
2016	Suicide Squad	Unit production manager
2018	The Meg	Unit production manager: China unit
2019−23	The Mandalorian	Unit production manager
2021−22	The Book of Boba Fett	Unit production manager

=== Miscellaneous Crew ===
Year	Film	Role
1991	Hook	Production effects producer

=== Thanks ===
Year	Title	Role
2013	American Hustle	Very special thanks
2015	Childhood Thoughts	Very special thanks
