= Calamari (disambiguation) =

Calamari is squid as food.

Calamari or Kalamari may also refer to:

- The Mon Calamari (fictional race), fictional amphibious humanoids in Star Wars
- Matthew Calamari, American business executive
- Vinicius Calamari, Brazilian footballer
- Calamari people, a pre-Columbian indigenous ethnic group of the area that is now Cartagena, Colombia
- Calamari Union, a 1985 film directed by Aki Kaurismäki.

== See also ==
- Kalamari (band), Slovene musical group
- Calamar (disambiguation)
