= List of Star Wars species (P–T) =

This is a list of Star Wars species, containing the names of fictional species from the Star Wars franchise beginning with the letters P to T. Star Wars is an American epic space opera film series created by George Lucas. The first film in the series, Star Wars, was released on May 25, 1977, and became a worldwide pop culture phenomenon, followed by five sequels and three prequels. Many species of alien creatures (often humanoid) are depicted. For the other species listed alphabetically, see the following:

- List of Star Wars species (A–E)
- List of Star Wars species (F–J)
- List of Star Wars species (K–O)
- List of Star Wars species (U–Z)

== Paaerduag ==
The Paaerduag is an "individual" formed by two symbiotic races that are joined as one. However, two voices create the actual name of their race, and four ears hear the true sound of it.

Paaerduag consist of two aspects: a larger, more mobile humanoid form with long, slender arms and legs, and a broad head; and a smaller aspect that rides on the larger one like a backpack. The smaller aspect resembles a humanoid with a slender, dog-like face and two sets of eyes. While the larger aspect's voice is inaudible to human ears, the smaller one can be heard and understood. The smaller aspect refers to itself using the term "we" instead of "I" or "me."

Their home is Sorjus, a small and unimportant world far off the Perlemian trade route, and has a temperate climate (as inferred from Mic'Tunan'Jus' complaints about Tatooine's climate being far too dry, and the dust is rough on their hide).

They begin life as individuals, however, at the age of choosing, they become bonded to their other half, and grow together as a single, complete being, sharing their brains, vision, hearing, and speech. There are two Paaerduag in Knights of the Old Republic: one in Javyar's Cantina on Taris, the other is a merchant in the docking area of Tatooine.

== Pa'lowick ==
The Pa'lowick are native to the swampy world of Lowick. They have bulbous bodies supported by long, thin legs. Their eyes are on short stalks that jut from their heads, and their mouths are located at the end of a long, thin proboscis. Most Pa'lowicks do not leave the planet. Other species travel to Lowick to mine the rare and beautiful Lowickian firegems. A notable Pa'lowick is Sy Snootles, the singer of the Max Rebo Band and former girlfriend of Ziro the Hutt. Other known Pa'lowicks include Sam Snootles, Keesa, Larisselle Chatrunis, and Aneesa Dym.

== Pau'an ==
The Pau'an are gaunt, near-human natives of the planet Utapau. They are also known as Utapauns or Ancients due to their long lifespans (up to 700 years), much longer than the Utai, the other species native to Utapa that they co-exist with on Utapau. The two species get along well, with the lanky Pau'ans having leadership roles on the planet. The species is taller on average than Humans are, at approximately 1.9 meters. They are bald, and their head is striped with furrowed, grey skin. Pau'ans weigh seventy kilograms on average. They have large, sunken black eyes in red eye sockets and jagged, fang-like teeth used for tearing into raw meat, as they are carnivores. The species has pale, wrinkled skin, and is able to see well in darkness due to the fact that they live in the sinkholes of Utapau, giving them limited access to light. Pau'an society is generally friendly, and they are happy to welcome guests to their often-overlooked world. Pau'ans have four fingers and toes. They often wear elaborate clothes intended to heighten their impressive stature. Most Pau'ans speak both Utapese and Basic.

Due to living in the Outer Rim Territories, the Pau'ans experienced isolation for much of their history due to Utapau's remoteness. In 19 BBY, during the Clone Wars, the Confederacy of Independent Systems conquered Utapau. The Pau'ans resisted the Confederacy with the assistance of the Galactic Republic. Subsequently, when the Galactic Empire took control of the planet following the Declaration of a New Order, the Pau'ans opposed Imperial rule as well.

The Pau'ans fulfilled most of the governmental and administrative duties on Utapau, as the Utai did not desire such work, serving as labourers instead. Most Pau'ans served as leaders early in their lives, often managing teams of Utai laborers. This gave them experience that would be used throughout their long lives. Pau'ans were kind leaders, and sympathetic to their subordinates. Despite the many differences between the Pau'ans and the Utai, the two species were able to co-exist peacefully, although inhabitants of the different Utapaun cities often had conflicts due to philosophical differences. Still, these conflicts rarely developed into bloodshed, and it was more common for the cities to ignore each other. Each city had its own culture, and competition was fierce between the groups. However, they were able to cooperate when the situation necessitated it, such as during the Confederate invasion of the planet in 19 BBY.

Pau'an society is characterized by a fusion of various styles and cultures, a result of the ancient integration with the Utai. Their settlements, such as the Pau City spaceport that is built into sinkhole walls, showcase a mix of architectural styles and unique designs. The Pau'ans have a penchant for art, engaging in the study of sculptures and integrating diverse artistic styles into their architecture. Despite their seemingly primitive appearance, Pau'ans have developed an industrial society, with the Utai undertaking the labor-intensive tasks. The Pau'ans utilize wind power, harnessed through massive windmills, to generate over ninety-nine percent of the planet's energy. Notably, many Pau'ans prefer riding living beasts like varactyls and dactillions instead of using speeders.

Each city on Utapau is governed by the individual holding the title of Master of Port Administration in that city. These administrators are supported by advisory councils to assist in decision-making. The overall governance of the planet is overseen by the Utapauan Committee, consisting of representatives from various cities. While this committee exists, crucial decisions are infrequent, as the cities are generally self-sufficient, only turning to the Utapauan Security Force when needed.

Pau'ans represented 30%—or approximately 28.5 million—of Utapau's total population of 90 million inhabitants, although their influence as administrators and leaders more than made up for their lack of numbers. Darth Desolous was a Pau'an as was the Imperial Grand Inquisitor.

== Phlog ==
The Phlogs are peaceful giants living on planet Genesia. Phlogs are giant sapients. They are used throughout the galaxy as guards, thugs, and gladiators, on planets such as Genesia. One group intended for slavery became stranded on the forest moon of Endor.

== Polis Massan ==
Polis Massans are humanoid aliens who inhabit the asteroid colony of Polis Massa. These thin, mute beings lead mining expeditions and medical research on their remote settlement. Polis Massa is actually the largest remnant of their original homeworld, which was fractured by a natural cataclysm. The survivors took up residence there and began mining the asteroid for artifacts from their former civilization. These archaeological digs were in progress for so long that the mining supervisors came to be known as Polis Massans, having adopted the asteroid as their new homeworld.

Polis Massans are characterized by their short, thin stature, flat and pale faces, and grey hands with four long, dexterous fingers. Due to their lack of speech, they communicate using sign language and devices. They also possess limited telepathy. Polis Massans have osmotic membrane faces and growth rings encircling their wiry bodies. Many of them engage in professions such as mining, medicine, or exobiology. Their typical attire consists of form-fitting bodysuits equipped with various signaling devices, medical equipment, and utility pouches.

Most Polis Massan miners are seasoned spelunkers who dig deep into the core of Polis Massa to recover prized artifacts. They analyze the artifacts for organic tissue suitable for cloning. For this reason, they set up a medical facility on the asteroid. Although they have little contact with humans, Polis Massans are known for their extraordinary medical skills, and are regarded as compassionate beings who understand the value of life.

Polis Massan medics and technicians helped to deliver the Skywalker twins when Padmé Amidala was rushed to the asteroid facility in critical condition. Only two members of the team were trained physicians. The rest were exobiologists. Although the twins were delivered safely with the help of a midwife droid, the Polis Massans could not mend Padmé's broken heart, and she died at the medical center.

== Priapulin ==
The Priapulin are a caterpillar-like species from the planet Pria. They have extremely flexible bodies, with five knobby notochords arranged along their tubular length. Their eyes are arranged in three pairs, one above the other, along the upper portion of their bodies, and can see in all directions at once. Their undersides are covered with thick brushy bristles. Thick, flexible spines emerge along the edges of their bodies. They speak by rubbing the bristles in front of their spiracles, or breathing vents. They need to constantly be in water. One notable Priapulin is Charza Kwinn, who assisted Obi-wan Kenobi and his apprentice Anakin Skywalker in their quest to obtain a living starship from the mysterious planet Zonoma Sekot.

== Psadan ==
One of the indigenous races of the planet Wayland. This race appeared in the last novel of the Thrawn trilogy by Timothy Zahn. In The Last Command, they are one of the races that the cloned and insane Jedi master Joruus C'baoth kept under his rule at the foot of Mount Tantiss.

== P'w'eck ==
The P'w'ecks are a warm-blooded, dinosaur-like species similar in appearance to the Ssi-Ruuk but with lower intelligence, smaller size, short tails and drooping eyes. The Ssi-Ruuk have dominated the P'w'ecks for thousands of years, enslaving and controlling their lives. They are used as slaves, guards and beasts of burden and perform the lowest jobs in Ssi-Ruuvi society.

Notable P'w'ecks include Lwothin, a leader of the P'w'eck Emancipation Movement.

== Pyke ==
The Pykes are a fish-like humanoid species from the planet Oba Diah. One notable group of Pykes was the Pyke Syndicate, a criminal organization and one of the most prominent spice dealers in the galaxy. The Pykes first appeared in Star Wars: The Clone Wars, in which the Pyke Syndicate has a major role in Darth Maul and the Death Watch's takeover of Mandalore, and is revealed to have been involved in the murder of Jedi Master Sifo-Dyas by Count Dooku. The Pykes made their first live-action appearance in Solo: A Star Wars Story. They appeared again in The Book of Boba Fett, in which the Pyke Syndicate fights Boba Fett's criminal empire for control of Tatooine's spice trade and loses.

== Quarren ==
Quarrens (or Qarrens) are a species of aquatic humanoids that share the planet of Mon Calamari with another sentient aquatic species, the Mon Calamari. The Quarren are also nicknamed "squid head" around the galaxy due to their resemblance to cephalopods, which Quarren are actually related to. They are more introverted than their neighbours, preferring the deep water to the surface and rarely inviting guests to their domain.

During the Clone Wars, the Quarren Isolation League attempted to isolate Mon Calamari from the rest of the galaxy. They were eventually defeated during the Battle of Mon Calamari where Clone SCUBA troopers under the command of Kit Fisto defeated them and their Separatist allies. Notable Quarren include Tessek, who escaped Mon Calamari to work for Jabba the Hutt on Tatooine and Darth Maleval who served with the 407th on the planet Borosk.

Quarrens were common leaders in the Exchange during the Old Republic.

== Quermian ==
A race of sentient vertebrates, the Quermian are a species native to the planet Quermia. They have two brains, a long, thin neck, and six limbs. Their sensitive olfactory glands are located in their hands and they are born with a natural talent in telepathy and mind control. They must look at the person in the eye if they are not force sensitive to perform this task. Among the more noticeable of this species is Jedi Master Yarael Poof. He served on one of the last Jedi High Councils and was present when Jedi Master Qui-Gon Jinn presented Anakin Skywalker to the Jedi Council for training.

== Rakata ==
The Rakata are an amphibian-humanoid species from the planet Lehon. They ruled an "Infinite Empire" of 500 worlds, several thousand years before the formation of the Republic. They are responsible for Tatooine's desert climate due to their razing of the planet, and Kashyyyk's lush overgrowth from their terraforming. During the travels of Revan (Knights of the Old Republic), it is discovered that this race went into decline due to the combination of a civil war and genetic plague. It is not known exactly when this happened, but by around 30,000 years before their rediscovery they became nearly extinct. The Rakata also used their technological skills and knowledge to build a massive space station called the Star Forge.

== Ranat ==
Ranats, known as Con Queecon in their own language, were a species of meter-tall rodents with long, tusk-like incisors jutting from their lower jaws. Though originally from Rydar II, the Ranats there were nearly wiped out by Human colonists in 200 BBY. Three Ranats stowed away on a spice freighter and crash landed on Aralia, where they re-established their species.

The Ranat tribes inhabited extensive tunnel networks, resembling intricate mazes, where they collectively raised their offspring. These tribes employed cunning tactics, leading intruders into dead ends to facilitate their elimination. Despite their simple personalities, with minimal displays of emotion beyond the instinct for food, Ranats demonstrated hostility toward both outsiders and members of their own kind. In response to the threat posed by pest-control teams seeking to eliminate them, the tribes cooperated to counter this common adversary.

Upon the arrival of entrepreneurs intending to transform Aralia into a planetary amusement park, Ranats resisted the intrusion and coordinated efforts to thwart these developments. The Antemeridian sector government designated Ranats as semi-sentient, allowing sentient beings to defend themselves against the rodents while prohibiting the arming of the species. The movement of well-armed groups to Aralia was restricted to conceal the existence of the Ranats and the controversial assessment of their sentience.

Few Ranats were seen away from Aralia, and those that left the world occupied the lowest levels of society. Ranats established themselves on Tatooine, where they lived in the more populated areas as scroungers and traders. One group overran crime lord Jabba Desilijic Tiure's Palace after his death, and the Vriichon brothers once owned the Mos Eisley Cantina. During the Galactic Civil War, the Imperial military tested Ranat mercenary bands for possible use against Rebel Alliance forces. Ranats were also found in the employ of the mage Orloc, who attempted to start his own Jedi Order. The Ranat Rik-tak was a member of the Justice Action Network who operated in the Tapani sector.

Ranats were omnivores and strongly preferred meat, especially that of Aralia's native robas. Their sharp incisors and claws were useful as both weapons and tunneling tools. Burrowing wore down their teeth but also released hormones that stimulated tooth growth; unchecked, the incisors could reach prodigious lengths, so most Ranats gnawed constantly to keep them filed back.

Ranats were a species of small rodents. They shared many features in common with sentient species such as their distant cousins, the Tintinna,[14] and with other sentient mammals of similar physiology, including Chadra-Fan and Squibs. Nevertheless, the status of Ranats as fully sentient or merely semi-sentient was the subject of galactic debate for centuries.

With few exceptions, Ranats stood about a meter high. This small size made them seem innocuous to many who encountered them and belied their power. They had short, well-muscled limbs with four digits on each forepaw and three per hindpaw. All four paws were nimble and capable of fine manipulation. Ranats had short, heavy-duty, retractable claws that, while of limited use in hunting or self-defence, allowed a Ranat to dig through as much as one meter of soil and loose rock in a mere 15 seconds.

The Ranat body was tough, wiry, and partially flattened. Exceptional flexibility allowed Ranats to squeeze through small openings that would prove impenetrable to other beings of similar size; the Shi'ido shapeshifter Mammon Hoole often assumed the form of a Ranat to take advantage of this very ability.[20] Although a typical Ranat had a long, scaly, hairless tail, the rodents were almost entirely covered in fur that ranged from dirty blond to dark reddish or greyish brown. Some Ranats groomed themselves, but for most, the coat was filthy and foul-smelling. Understandably, many non-Ranats considered the species to be visually unappealing. Ranats stooped when they stood and scampered and scurried when they ran. They tended to wear little more clothing than cloth hoods, leather belts, and ornamental tooth bands. However, those Ranats who integrated into galactic society often wore full-length tunics and footwear.

The Ranats' eyes, located at the sides of the head, varied in color from beady and black, to red. Their hairless, pink ears were small and round and typically lay flat against the head. A Ranat's long, pointed snout was full of sharp teeth and terminated in a yellowish-white nose surrounded by long, black whiskers. Their senses were acute: they could see in the dark and detect others' moods by scent. Ranats spoke in a voice of squeaks and screeches.

A Ranat's bottom two incisors were sharp, pointed, and discolored yellow or brown from tartar and dirt. Gnawing stimulated glands in the Ranat's jaw to produce growth hormones. Unchecked, this caused the incisors to grow up to a centimeter in a standard hour. The only way to counter the growth was to gnaw even more and wear the teeth down. Some members of the species managed to keep these teeth small enough to fit inside the mouth, but others had incisors that poked out and overlapped the upper lip like tusks. Coupled with their sharp teeth and powerful jaws, these incisors gave Ranats a dangerous bite.

Ranats were fecund. Females went into heat at least twice each standard year, during which period they mated with as many males as possible. After fertilization, the fetus gestated for about 120 standard days. The mother then gave birth to a litter of three to six young. The species' signature incisors began to grow in at adolescence. Members of the species were considered adults at three standard years of age, and the average Ranat could expect to live to be 20 standard years old.

A song from the Max Rebo Band, the fictional band in the Star Wars universe that is playing in Jabba the Hutt's palace in Return of the Jedi, is dedicated to them known as "Kick That Ranat".

== Rattataki ==
Native to the planet Rattatak, the Rattataki were noticeable for their pale white skin color. They developed a violent culture, like fierce combat involving gladiators of their home world. Asajj Ventress was originally a Rattataki but with the release of season three of the Clone Wars cartoon her back story has been rewritten by the writers of the show and was the most famous member of their species.

They were a playable race in Star Wars: The Old Republic.

== Rishii ==
The Rishii are an avian species from the planet Rishi. They have human-like hands at the ends of their wings. They fly at great speeds from cliffs to catch rodents in their talons. Like most avians, the Rishii live in nests built on cliffs. The Rishii are a kind species, but have an ability to mimic other languages, which, at times, is a little annoying to the people they are mimicking.

== Rodian ==
Doda Bodonawieedo, a Rodian

Rodians are a species of green, antenna-sporting, bug-eyed humanoids from the planet Rodia. The Rodians are born hunters; they killed most of the wildlife and grew restless with the lack of creatures and began to hunt each other in gladiatorial combat, until the Republic found them. Many continued to hunt as bounty hunters; the most notable specimen was Greedo, the bounty hunter shot by Han Solo in the Mos Eisley cantina in the original Star Wars movie. In the 1997 special edition of Return of the Jedi, two Rodians were added, one named Greeata who served as a dancer in Jabba the Hutt's palace on Tatooine, and Doda Bodonawieedo (picture on right), a member of the Max Rebo Band who plays the flute. A young Rodian named Wald (played by Warwick Davis), a friend of Anakin Skywalker, appears in The Phantom Menace. In Attack of the Clones, Rodians are represented by Senator Onaconda Farr, and Palpatine's aide Dar Warc. Rodians were one of the species playable in Star Wars: Galaxies.

The Hutt colonization of Rodia brought changes to the Rodian race. Old Rodian slowly ceased to be a written and spoken language. Huttese was adopted as the official language and soon came to be spoken by the Rodians.

Some Rodians are enlisted in the public service of the Hutts and tend to fare better than others of their race. Any association with the Hutts often brings great rewards but sometimes can bring heavy consequences.

Rodians are well suited for the rigors of being a bounty hunter. This is because of their harsh jungle home world, Rodia, and the guerrilla style clan-warfare that they witness (or participate in) on an almost daily basis.

== Roonan ==
Roonans are a bulbous-headed, almond-eyed alien species from the planet Roona. Notable characters of this race include the Galactic Senate representative Edcel Bar Gane, and the Jedi Knight Halsey.

== Ruurian ==
Ruurians are like walking, fuzzy Huttlets. They come from Ruuria.

== Ryn ==
Ryn are a humanoid race. Their bodies are covered in fur that primarily grows in a short fuzz all around, with the exception of their human-like hair and the human-like mustaches on the men. They also have prehensile tails, excellent for grasping things. They are nomadic, with no knowledge of their original home world, and are either hated, ignored, or quietly despised in every corner of the Galaxy, notably such areas as the Corporate Sector, are fond of dance, song, and the enjoyment of life. A peculiar habit of theirs is that a Ryn cannot sleep in the same location twice.

They apparently once had an impressive warrior tradition on their home world, but that was, save for their tendency to fight tenaciously, apparently lost, although sabacc, the popular card game that took the place of Pazaak in terms of card game prominence, is derived from their use of it as a fortune telling tool in their auguries. These auguries are today favored by Hutts, who have a superstitious belief in the card tellings (that may not be entirely unjustified when the Force comes into play.)

A Ryn named Droma aided Han Solo in escaping the Jubilee Wheel, a space station in orbit around Ord Mantell, when it was attacked by a Yuuzhun Vong Tizo worm. the two later parted ways only to be reunited later aboard the Queen of Empire. Han later agrees to assist Droma in finding his clan-mates.

== Saffa ==
The Saffa's main contribution is an important art form, the Saffa paintings, which were created after the Saffa made contact with the Thennqora. This artistic medium reached its height approximately 1550–2200 BBY (before the battle of Yavin). One of the few mentions of Saffa paintings occurs in Heir to the Empire, where one of them is seen projected around Grand Admiral Thrawn's chair and is mentioned when Thrawn asks Captain Pellaeon what he knows about art. A quick lesson ensues about the importance of art in understanding a species.

== Sanyassan ==
The Sanyassan Marauders were a savage group of ape-like reptiloids with greyish-green skin originally from the planet Sanyassa that crash landed sometime in the past on the forest moon of Endor. They are featured in the movie Ewoks: The Battle for Endor. Led by their brutal leader King Terak, they were always searching for a way to get off Endor. However, their ship was beyond repair since they had destroyed it long ago. Terak thought that a mystical Power would make them rulers of the Galaxy. During a raid on Bright Tree Village, Wicket W. Warrick's hometown, they captured many Ewoks including Wicket. They also captured Cindel Towani and killed the rest of her family.

Wicket and Cindel escaped from the marauders' fearsome prison cart and found their way to the home of Noa Briqualon. Eventually the Marauders were defeated and their king killed.

They are also featured in the MMORPG Star Wars Galaxies.

== Saurin ==
Saurin are a priestal species, one of the two inhabitant races of the planet Bimmiel.

== Sauvax ==
The Sauvax were a lobster-like sentient species who hail from Leritor.

== Sedrian ==
The Sedrians were a little-known pinniped-like race from Sedri.

== Selkath ==
Selkath are the native species of the planet Manaan. An aquatic species, they are very good swimmers and have the ability to breathe out of water. They resemble anthropomorphic catfish and have aqua-colored skin. In ancient times, their ancestors were slaves to the Rakata. Their planet has only one city above water, the capital, Ahto City, and it is the position of the Selkath to remain neutral in times of intergalactic conflict. Their laws are very harsh, and it is common for violence or attempts to compromise Manaan's neutrality to be punished by death. But some believed if the Sith won the Jedi Civil War, they would conquer Manaan. So, they made a secret agreement with the Republic to build a facility right at the kolto source.

All members of the Selkath race have venom-tipped, retractable claws. Similar to the Wookiees, the use of these claws in any form of combat is considered dishonourable and a sign of madness. A large, female Firaxan Shark, known as the Progenitor, is seen as either a deity, or even an early evolutionary step in the Selkath chain. This belief is similar to that of a mother Earth goddess, or mother "ocean" goddess in this case. After the events in Knights of the Old Republic, a Force tradition known as the Order of Shasa arose among the Selkath.

The population of the Selkath has always been low, even in times of prosperity, but there was a greater proportion of Force-sensitives compared to other species. The members of the Order act as seers, advisers, and elite military leaders in times of war. Their main weapon is a fira, a curved sword, similar to a scimitar, constructed of Cortosis and as part of initiation in the Order of Shasa. Some time after the Battle of the Star Forge, the source of Kolto dried up for reasons unknown and foreign groups abandoned Ahto City and the Selkath. As such, the Selkath gradually reverted to primitive ways, and abandoned Ahto City. When the Empire returned centuries later, Ahto City was revived, but the Selkath were enslaved. As in many other examples of racism and speciesism, the Empire polluted the oceans of Manaan and wrecked the environment. Darth Vader himself (a Sith who was closely connected to Darth Sidious, the Emperor) came to the planet, and soon started a quiet, but bloody, revolt of the Selkath against the Empire. However, he told several Force-sensitive Selkath warriors and Shasan Adepts of when and where to strike the Imperial Stormtrooper patrols. It is currently unknown whether the Empire put down this revolt, left the planet, or didn't even care.

== Selonian ==
A furred, burrowing species from the Corellian System, Selonians resemble giant weasels or otters in appearance. Most Selonians are infertile females; one in every 100 is a male, and 5 in 100 are fertile females. Selonians live in clans more akin to insects than mammals, always headed by a female. Although they do possess advanced technology, they usually stay on-planet. They are known to treat lying and deceit as a crime, and like Wookiees, usually don't wear clothes.

== Shawda Ubb ==
Shawda Ubb are native to the swamp planet Manpha. Shawda Ubb are short and amphibian-like. The character Rappertunie from Return of the Jedi is the only known member of this race.

== Shi'ido ==
A rare humanoid shape-shifting species of aliens, not entirely unlike Clawdites, except that they also use mind-clouding abilities to infiltrate cultures. The first Shi'ido introduced in the Star Wars Expanded Universe was Senior Anthropologist Mammon Hoole, who authored a study of Tatooine in The Illustrated Star Wars Universe, which tells of his impersonating a Jawa and a Tusken Raider. He also featured in the Galaxy of Fear series as the uncle of humans Tash and Zak Arranda, along with Shi'ido Imperial scientist Borborygmus Gog.

== Shistavanen ==
Colloquially nicknamed "wolfmen", the Shistavanen are a werewolf-like alien race native to Uvena Prime, one of many habitable planets in the Uvena system. Their bodies are covered in dark hair and they have intimidating, glowing red eyes and sharp fangs. They have very well developed senses, making them extremely good hunters. Like the Wookiees, the Shistavanen are naturally well-suited to work as scouts, but unlike the Wookiees, are more commonly employed by the Empire. Shistavanen are a very xenophobic race who do not like outsiders interfering with their business. Most Shistavanen are aggressive to other races but some are less xenophobic and more sociable, although they are a minority. The race has not been much developed even in the Expanded Universe, an exception being Rogue Squadron's Riv Shiel, but one is visible in the Mos Eisley cantina in A New Hope. This one, Lak Sivrak, was also at one stage a member of the Rebel Alliance, eventually dying when his X-Wing crash landed on the Forest Moon of Endor. His story is told in "Tales From the Mos Eisley Cantina" as "One Last Night in the Mos Eisley Cantina", co-authored by Judith and Garfield Reeves-Stevens. Jedi Master Voolvif Monn is an example of this species.

== Sikan ==
The Sikans are an alien race native to the planet of Sika.

== Sith ==
The Sith (also known as Red Sith during the time of the Old Sith Empire and Sith Purebloods during the time of the resurgent Sith Empire) were the native species of the planet Korriban. They had red skin and tentacle "beards", and had a natural talent for mastering the Force as well as their magic and alchemy. Naturally cruel and manipulative, the Sith spread throughout the outer rim in the early days of the Old Republic, eventually centering their empire on Korriban. Some time after the Great Schism, several refugee Dark Jedi settled on the planet. Amazing the Sith with their mastery of the Force, the fallen Jedi soon elevated themselves to god-like status, becoming the rulers of the Sith. As the centuries passed, interbreeding occurred between the human Dark Jedi and the Sith, creating a half-species with an enormous talent for manipulating the Force. This species, which were also called Sith, had red skin like the original Sith. A prominent member of this half-species was the Sith Lord Marka Ragnos.

The name "Sith" was adopted by their Dark Jedi rulers, and has later been used by numerous fallen Jedi organizations. These new Sith are the primary antagonists in the Star Wars saga.

They are a playable race in the massively multiplayer online role-playing game, Star Wars: The Old Republic.

The extinct race Sith was the mortal enemy of the extinct race Jedi. According to the codex in Star Wars Knights of the Old Republic II: The Sith Lords, both races drove each other to extinction, but not before spawning groups that copied and continued their ideals (the new "Sith" and the "Jedi Knights").

Naga Sadow was another pureblooded Sith. His apprentice Freedon Nadd was Human.

== Skakoan ==
The atmosphere in Skako is extremely dense, so Skakoans evolved to survive under great pressures. When a Skakoan leaves Skako, he/she decompresses and dies in any low-pressure environment. Thus, they wear special protective suits. Very few non-Skakoans have seen a Skakoan without the suit. The Skakoans were relatively unknown in the galaxy, except for their control of the Techno Union, an important union of engineers and scientists.

The most notable Skakoan is Wat Tambor, Foreman of the Techno Union.

== Sneevel ==
A very scarce species, Sneevels are medium-sized creatures that have the nose of a pig, fangs, and a werewolf body. So far, Boles Roor is the only known Sneevel. Their home planet was known as Sneeve.

== Snivvian ==
Coming from Cadomai Prime, Snivvians are short humanoids with protruding jaws and short fangs, sometimes called Snaggletooths (two versions of a Snivvian action figure dubbed Snaggletooth were produced for Kenner's Star Wars action figure line in 1978, based on a Snivvian character seen in Mos Eisley's Chalmun's Cantina). Snivvians come from a cold world and have thick skin instead of fur. They are excellent scouts and trackers, and also obsessive artists. Frequently, a Snivvian author will research their characters to an extreme level, sometimes with great risk. When twin males are born, one of them is always a psychotic genius, so they try to control their genetics.

They are a race similar in feature to Trandoshans and considered a sociopathic species.

== Squib ==
A species from Skor II, Squibs are known for collecting knickknacks and for their love of trading/haggling. These fox-like creatures stand about a meter tall, with large, doe-like eyes and short fur ranging from red to blue in color. The Squibs evolved on Skor II, a world blessed with nearly limitless resources. These resources, however, were widely distributed across the planet. Consequently, the Squibs developed a sophisticated system of barter and trade as different Squib tribes exchanged goods with one another. Another interesting evolutionary trait is the Squib fur, which acts as a taste and smell receptor, enables a Squib to examine an object by touching it and rubbing it against his or her fur. Squibs are generally confident, gregarious, and annoyingly curious. They tend to run into a situation to examine virtually anything without any regard to possible danger to themselves. Their fast-paced metabolisms make them a bundle of energy, and they are often regarded as flighty by other beings.

Their spaceships are built from recycled materials and utilize superior tractor beam technology to wield balls of refuse as both sword and shield.

== Ssi-Ruuk ==
The Ssi-Ruuk are a saurian race that invade from the Unknown Regions of the galaxy. This was around 4 ABY (After the Battle of Yavin), immediately following Return of the Jedi, in the novel The Truce at Bakura. Native to the planet Lwhekk, Ssi-Ruuk are warm-blooded, reptilian beings covered with scales of various colors. Their blunt, oversized heads end with beaked mouths, and their bodies end with muscular tails. They have clawed hands and feet, and strongly-muscled hind legs. Their skin is so thick that it can withstand blaster shots with only minor burns to show for it. They are blind to the Force, and communicate with each other via a complex series of tweets and whistles. They also have scent tongues which they eject from their nostrils. Each hand has three opposable claws. They all have three eyelids. As a rule, the Ssi-ruuk were highly xenophobic, but were more disgusted by other species than afraid of them. Their religion greatly fears death on any planet that has not been "sanctified." As a result, they rely on a technology called entechment that involved capturing the life-energy of beings and using them as power sources. Entechment allows them to use unmanned spaceships for the majority of their combat.

== Stereb ==
The Stereb were a race of primitive, red-skinned near-humans who once inhabited the world of Serocco. While they do not appear in any media, their story is told in detail in Star Wars Knights of the Old Republic II: The Sith Lords. The Stereb possessed primitive technology and built many simple cities across their world. They co-existed with the human population of Serocco until their race was completely destroyed by the Mandalorians' nuclear weapons during the Battle of Serocco.

== Sullustan ==
A Sullustan is a native of the Sullust system. They are short, mouse-eared humanoids with large eyes and mouth-folds, known primarily as merchants and engineers.

The Sullustans live in vast caves on the planet Sullust. Most Sullustans work for the Sorusuub Corporation. The majority of those that have found their way off-world work as starship crew. They have a reputation for excellence and intuition for piloting, which has mostly been earned through simple hard work, although as a race they possess perfect direction sense and memory thanks to spending their lives inside the pitch black caves and tunnels that run through Sullust. This allows them to remember any paths they have traveled, or maps they have seen, making them excellent navigators.

In the Star Wars films, Sullustans make no appearance prior to Return of the Jedi (1983), where the most prominent member of the species seen on-screen, Nien Nunb, is Lando Calrissian's co-pilot in the Millennium Falcon as it attacks the Death Star. A secondary Sullustan character was called Ten Nunb and was present at the briefing led by Mon Mothma, Admiral Ackbar, and General Madine, who was a B-wing pilot in the Rebel Alliance. He was killed by General Weir in the non-canonical comic series X-Wing: Rogue Leader published by Dark Horse Comics.

According to the Star Wars Insider #67, p. 31, "Ben Burtt used the real-world language Haya, a Kenyan dialect for Nunb's Sullustan dialogue."

In the Star Wars expanded universe, there is also the X-wing pilot Aril Nunb, a member of Rogue Squadron.

Jae Juun is a freighter pilot, also from the Star Wars expanded universe. When first introduced (in The Joiner King), he pilots a Correllian freighter in the same class as the Millennium Falcon. His co-pilot is an Ewok named Tarfang. He later pilots the DR-909, and he and Tarfang help Luke Skywalker, Han Solo, Leia Organa, and their friends on their various exploits. The two of them run spinglass busts and sculptures for the Saras nest, and would have gotten into trouble with the Galactic Alliance government when it was discovered that these busts contained Gorog assassin bugs, had it not been for the intervention of Luke Skywalker and Han Solo, who spoke to the Fifth Fleet admiral on their behalf, informing him of their innocence in the matter and their determination to right the wrong once it was discovered. Jae Juun and Tarfang are then employed as Intelligence agents by the Galactic Alliance.

Sullustans are also a playable race in Star Wars Galaxies.

== Talortai ==
The Talortai, a Force-sensitive sentient species from the planet Talor, had some avian and reptilian characteristics. Tyber Zann's bodyguard Urai Fen was a member of the species.

== Talpini ==
The Talpini are a species from world of Tal Pi. Their small size lets them conceal themselves easily among taller or bigger individuals. Weeteef Cyubee (played by Warwick Davis in Rogue One) was a member of this species.

== Talz ==
The Talz are a furry race with two distinct sets of eyes: one for day vision, and one for night vision. They're generally peaceful and pacifistic creatures, but were forced into slave labor by the Empire.

Foul Moudama was a Talz Jedi Knight who died protecting Chancellor Palpatine from General Grievous.

Another notable Talz is Muftak from the book Tales From The Mos Eisley Cantina. In his story, he and a Chadra-Fan named Kabe pillage Jabba's townhouse in Mos Eisley, but get caught and Muftak sacrifices himself for Kabe to escape and make a living with the money and jewels that they stole from Jabba's house, but Kabe goes back to save him, and in the process the sack of money and jewels gets stolen.

Another notable Talz is Broonmark who served the Emperor's Wrath in the Cold War.

They make an appearance in Star Wars: The Clone Wars, the TV series.

== Tarasin ==
Tarasin are chameleon-like species that can communicate silently by fluctuating skin color.

== Taung ==
The Taung were early people of the capital planet of the Galactic Republic, Coruscant. They were the early ancestors of the Mando'a speaking Mandalorians. The Mandalorians inhabited Coruscant long before humans did. They battled the Zhell people (former humans) and the Mandalorians were driven out of the planet by a volcanic explosion which created a massive dust cloud. They also have a healing trait that far surpasses most other races, including ones like the Gen’dai and such, which they used to aid them in leading the Mandalorians off of their planet. Though most of the Mandalorians were thought to be driven out, some were rumored to have stayed behind and live amongst them.

== Tauntaun ==
Tauntauns appear in The Empire Strikes Back as furry bipedal mounts the Rebels ride to patrol the planet Hoth in the vicinity of their hidden stronghold, Echo Base. Han Solo complained that tauntauns smelled bad, and that their innards smelled worse.

One appears in the center of this movie poster for the film.

== Tchuukthai ==
The Tchuukthai, also called Wharls, are quadrupedal predators from an undiscovered planet. They are sentient, but most people in the galaxy consider them to be mere legendary beasts. The secretive Tchuukthai do nothing to discourage this belief; if anything, they enhance it with their displays of ferocity. The Tchuukthai are unable to speak Galactic Basic, and very few are ever seen off their home planet. Jedi Master Thon was a Tchuukthai.

== Teek ==
Teeks are rodentlike, simian creatures that live in the forest moon of Endor. They were first mentioned in The Illustrated Star Wars Universe book and one appeared in the movie Ewoks: The Battle for Endor. They have a reputation of scavenging and stealing from animal nests and Ewok dwellings.

Teeks have long, pointed ears, scruffy white fur, and beady black eyes. They communicate by constant chattering. They wear clothes with many belts, pouches and pockets for the things they have managed to steal. They are also distinguished for running at stunning speed, almost moving too fast for the human eye to see.

== Terentatek ==
Terentatek originally evolved on Korriban, where the power and presence of the dark side gradually distorted their shapes and corrupted their minds. Some sources, however, say that they were first created on Yavin 4 by Exar Kun, as one of his experiments in 3,997 BBY. It is possible that terentateks are highly altered rancors undergoing many experiments. Regardless, terentatek's hide was immune to effects of the Force. They became the most dangerous of the creatures bred by the Sith. They were so powerful and dangerous to the Jedi, that they were often dubbed Jedi Killers.

During an event known as the Great Hunt, numerous Jedi traveled throughout the galaxy to try to exterminate the terentatek. Jedi were often sent in groups of two or three to battle these beasts, and the Jedi of the group had a strong Force bond between them. This was done so that the group could strengthen itself from the dark influence prevalent in the lairs of the terentatek, and as it had to rely on its weaponry skills alone due to the almost complete Force immunity of the terentatek. None of the hunts were successful, however. Even though the Jedi seemingly exterminated a majority of the terentatek each time, the waxing of the dark side would trigger the terentatek to come out of hibernation and repopulate the galaxy. Such events included the rise to power of Revan, Malak, and Emperor Palpatine.

Terentatek were also found on Tatooine, Kashyyyk, Onderon, Tython, and Yavin 4. During the Jedi Civil War, Revan and his companions found and killed a terentatek in Kashyyyk's Shadowlands while searching for the Star Forge. It had been a ceremonial beast used in an old Wookiee ritual. In one such ritual many years ago, Bacca's Ceremonial Blade had broken from its hilt and become embedded in the creature's flesh when a headstrong Wookiee chieftain had attempted to slay it—the blade was recovered by Revan. Revan also single-handedly fought and killed two terentateks in the tomb of Naga Sadow. There was also a terentatek in the Shyrak Caves on Korriban, which turned out to be near the entrance to the tomb of Ludo Kressh.

== Terrelian Jango Jumper ==
Terrelian Jango Jumpers are tall, slender humanoids from the planet Terrelia. Terrelians are an athletic species with high jumping capabilities and multicolored skin that could vary from gray to blue or white. Terrelians in the Galaxy included Cassilyda "Cassie" Cryar (a criminal from the Coruscant criminal underworld) and the Eighth Brother (a member of the Galactic Empire's Inquisitorius).

The species first appeared in Star Wars: The Clone Wars, appearing again in Star Wars: Rebels.

== Thakwaash ==
An equine-humanoid species, the Thakwaash reside on the world of Thakwaa.

The entire Thakwaash race is afflicted with a form of dissociative identity disorder. Each member possesses multiple 'minds'; each of these minds (and associated personalities) controlling a different skill or talent.

The most notable member of the Thakwaash race is Wraith Squadron pilot Hohass "Runt" Ekwesh.

== Theelin ==
Theelin are a fictional race from the Star Wars saga. They are a humanoid race and individual members have different skin and hair colors. Rystáll is half Theelin (her mother is human).

== Thennqora ==
This species influenced Saffa paintings after their initial contact several millennia ago.

== Tiss'shar ==
The Tiss'shar were a Velociraptor-looking sentient species that come from Tiss'sharl.

== Thisspiasian ==
Thisspiasians are a sentient serpentine species from the planet Thisspias. Master Oppo Rancisis, who sat on the Jedi Council during the Clone Wars, is the only example of a character of this species in the films.

== Thrella ==
An extinct species from Mimban, mentioned in the novel Splinter of the Mind's Eye. They were the builders of the Temple of Pomojema.

== Timoliini ==
An extremely rare species from Mimban, this species lives in the southern swamps. Timoliini is known for its filthy eating habits and yellow-green skin. The species communicates by loud, high-pitched squeaks, sometimes as loud as 140 Decibels. Timoliinis live alone, are rarely seen in packs, and are highly anti-social. Little is known of the species. It has been speculated that a Timoliini can be seen in Star Wars: Episode III – Revenge of the Sith, in the background in a Twilek's cage.

== Tirraclesians ==
Tirraclesians are a small race of humanoids who live on the planet Tirracles. As the planet Tirracles has two main continents, Tirraclesians generally identify themselves by which continent they were raised on: Tirracles-Kital and Tirracles-Nantor. Most Tirraclesians have light brown skin, dark red/brown/black hair, and brown/gold eyes. A small group of Tirraclesians also identify as Jensaari and a few manage to become Jedi. They are skilled craftsmen and do trade often with Endor and Rattatak.

== T'landa Til ==
A race of quadrupedal aliens with delicate, frail arms, they were a distant cousin of the Hutt species. T'landa Til males have developed a genetic ability to attract females of their kind, which as a by-product produces powerful, addictive physical and mental waves of pleasure in most humanoid races. The Hutts have been known to exploit this ability for the slave trade. The T'landa Til are developed in A.C. Crispin's Han Solo trilogy.

== Tof ==
Green-skinned humanoids from planet Tof, beyond the Galactic Rim, they are considered to be devoid of morals, compassion, or patience. They were ruled by monarchs, who usually possessed military experience. They are natural enemies of the Nagai and both species are usually at war.

== Togorian ==
Togorians are the felinoid inhabitants of Togoria. Most of them over two metres tall, the beings are covered with fur and have long slender muscles. They are described in A. C. Crispin's The Paradise Snare as very tall panther-like creatures. A Togorian male spends most of his time hunting, in pursuit of prey, they are known to use reptilian mosgoths as mounts. Once a year, male Togorians return to their city homes to mate. Female Togorians are famed for their technological proficiency. Male Togorians are often employed as pirates or bounty hunters due to their great size and power. Male Togorians will occasionally scatter crystal fragments in their thick fur, to dazzle their opponents.

Notable Togorians include Frrash, Muuurgh and Mrrov. Muuurgh met Han Solo while searching for his lost love among spice traders of Ylesia. At least one of the Vigos of the Black Sun criminal organization, killed by Darth Maul, was Togorian. The Togorians are known to have once been the barbaric pirates of the galaxy.

== Togruta ==
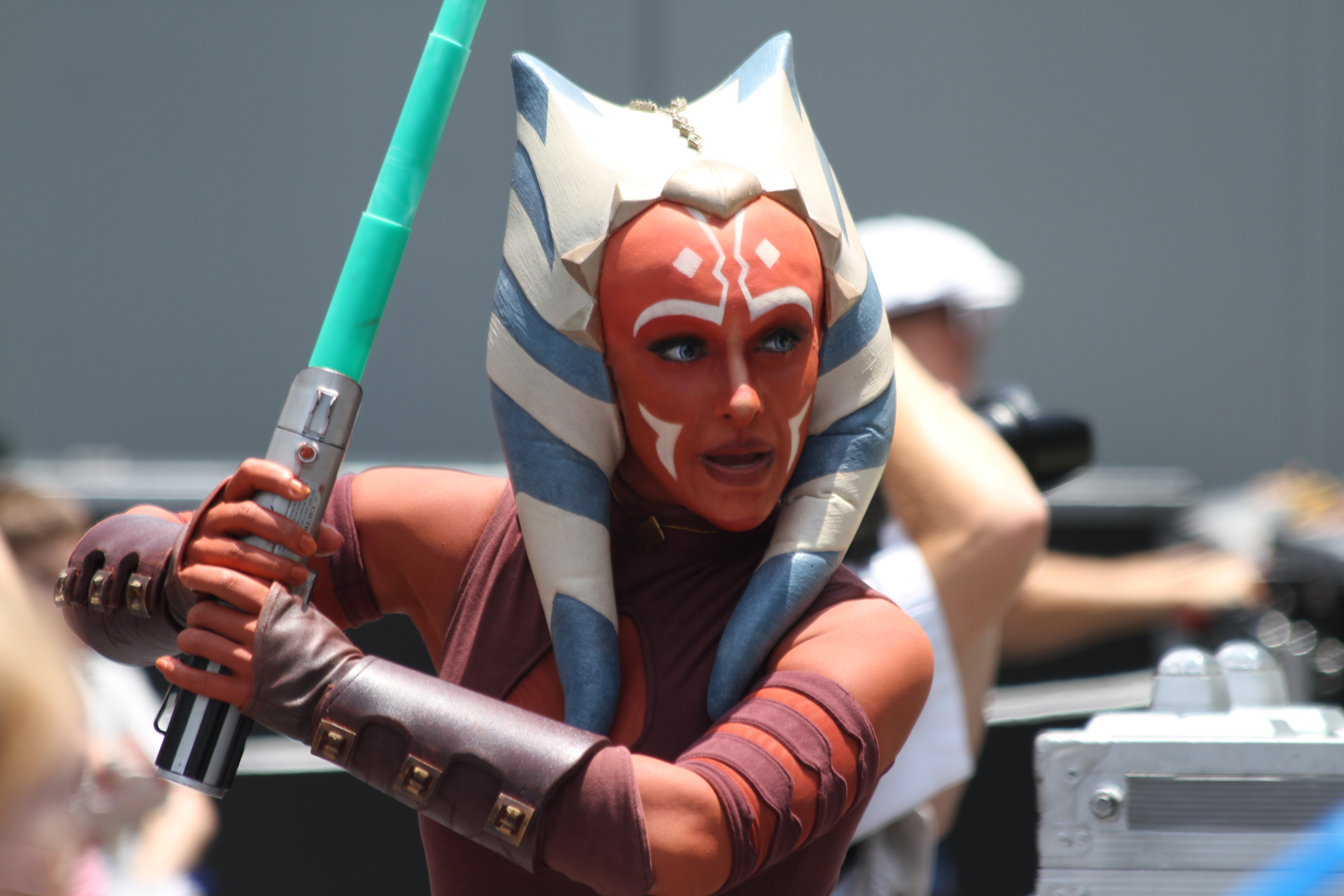
Cosplay of a Togruta, Ahsoka Tano

The Togruta are a species from the planet Shili. They are a humanoid race distinguished by their three, and in rare cases four, lekku, or head tails (similar to those of Twi'leks) and hollow horn-like structures on their heads, known as montrals, which are integrated with their lekku. Their lekku also have a part of their brain in each one. Their montrals and lekku are striped to help them blend in with their natural surroundings. Skin colors of Togrutas are usually quite different from their striped montrals and lekku and range from red (most common), to orange, yellow, blue, and even white. Togruta possess a form of passive acoustic echolocation by means of their hollow montrals, which allows them to sense space and the proximity and movement of physical objects around them. Togruta work well in large groups, and individualism is seen as abnormal within their culture. They are also famous for their beauty.

Jedi Master Shaak Ti, Anakin Skywalker's Padawan Ahsoka Tano (The Clone Wars, Star Wars Rebels, The Mandalorian, and Ahsoka), and Jedi Master Jora Malli (Light of the Jedi and Into the Dark) are Togruta. All the Jedi Togruta noted (so far) in the Star Wars universe are females.

== Toong ==
The Toong are a race of yellowish-skinned bipeds who sport large heads without a neck, gangly limbs and three antennae. They are timid and nervous by nature, and prefer to avoid confrontations. One notable Toong is the podracer Ben Quadinaros. Ben is known to be the best podracer this side of the moisture farms.

== Toydarian ==
Toydaria is a swampy world in Hutt Space. The Toydarians are short, blue-skinned mammals, with generally fat bodies and trunk-like snouts. Their stomachs are full of light gases, allowing them to fly when flapping their leathery wings. They have trunks on their faces that rest above their short tusks. A Toydarian's thin legs end in webbed feet and the males of the species usually show sparse whiskers on their chin and throat, giving them an unshaven appearance. They are immune to every mind trick caused by the Force (As stated by Watto: "I'm a Toydarian! Mind tricks don't work on me—only money!"). Watto, a slaver who owned Anakin Skywalker, is a Toydarian, as is Reti, a starfighter pilot in the Starfighter series of games. Air traffic is strictly regulated on Toydaria as the Toydarians all fly around the planet and rarely use vehicles. There are trains on the planet for other travelers.

== Trandoshan ==
A Trandoshan from Star Wars Galaxies

Trandoshan are large, carnivorous, reptilian humanoids from the planet Trandosha (or Dosha), they have supersensitive eyes that can see into the infrared range and the ability to regenerate lost limbs. They are also able to shed their skin. The Trandoshans are a warlike species who allied early with the Empire and the Confederacy during the Clone Wars, taking Wookiees as slaves. They are the natural enemies of Wookiees, and both Wookiees and Trandoshans keep each other's dried skins and pelts as prizes.

As of the original Star Wars races book, their world of origin (Trandoshan or Dosha) occupies the same stellar system as Kashyyyk (the Wookiee homeworld), and it is this proximity that is the source of much of their enmity for the Wookiee race. Unconfirmed speculation suggests that the short-lived Trandoshani overcame their natural limitations as tool users and their harsh homeworld environment to achieve limited space flight on their own, only to discover that the only other inhabited world in their system was a lush, verdant, prey-rich paradise filled with long-lived and technologically unsophisticated savages, and that they've never quite gotten over their pique.

Trandoshan religion consists mainly of trying to score enough Jagannath points (The name appears to derive from Jagannath, a deity from Vaishnavism,) earned through bounty-hunting or slavery-based kills, to appease the main goddess, or Scorekeeper. Thus, many Trandoshans are bounty hunters or slavers, operating both inside and outside the boundaries of the law. They take particular pleasure in skinning Wookiees for their pelts.

A notable Trandoshan is Bossk, who had a cameo role in the movies and is a longtime enemy of both Han Solo and Chewbacca the Wookiee.

The race was playable in Star Wars Galaxies, but were unable to wear most footwear or gloves. They also feature in the computer game Republic Commando, where a force of Trandoshan mercenaries take over a Republic ship, and in the Knights of the Old Republic series (particularly in II, where on the world of Nar Shaddaa an elderly Trandoshan can be conversed with for an extended philosophical debate). Bossk is also a playable character in the Real Time Strategy game Star Wars: Empire at War as part of the Forces of Corruption expansion pack. In Star Wars: The Old Republic, Qyzen Fess is an attainable Trandoshan companion character.

Two examples of Trandoshans are Dar and his father and the leader of the Trandoshans, Garnac.

== Trianii ==
An advanced, adventurous feline species, the Trianii inhabit the outermost portion of the Corporate Sector Authority. In many ways they are similar to the Togorians, Cathar, and Catuman Warriors. Unlike these other feline species, however, Trianii have prehensile tails and their more agile figures are perfect for leaping, jumping, and acrobatics. Like most feline species Trianii have excellent balance and eyesight. Their sleek fur comes in a wide range of colors and patterns. Trian, the Trianii home planet, and its six colony worlds were the target of an attempted annexation by the Corporate Sector Authority. This annexation was repelled by the Trianii and their renowned Rangers and the Trianii remained independent and unhindered throughout the rise and fall of the Empire.

== Trogodile ==
The Trogodiles were a race of crocodilian-like species of Rattatak. They first appeared in Star Wars: Clone Wars.

== Troig ==
A two-headed, four-armed species that inhabit the planet Pollillus. They were discovered shortly before the Battle of Naboo. The Troig Fodesinbeed Annodue commentated during the Boonta Eve podrace that won Anakin Skywalker's freedom.

== Tunroth ==
The Tunroth are bipedal sentients indigenous to the Jiroch system of the Mid Rim. Towering and physically strong, Tunroth have distinctive elongated heads, a vertical nostril at the top of the skull, and three-digit hands and feet. Widely spaced eyes and sharp horns that line the chin constituted other distinct physical features. The species is renowned throughout the galaxy for their hunting and tracking skills. They have an innate ability to track a quarry, and over time, an elite association known as the Tunroth Hunters came into demand for employment as bounty hunters and big-game hunters. The fact that the Tunroth maintained their use of sacred hunting weapons such as the klirun bow and the kilter staff even after galactic-standard blasters became available to them attested to the religious importance the Tunroth placed on hunter traditions. Each Tunroth community was ruled by the greatest hunter present. Aggressive and hard-working, Tunroth had a tendency to intimidate members of other species.

The Tunroth were members of the Galactic Republic for thousands of years. After first contact with outsiders, the species spread to other habitable planets in their system. In 7 BBY, during the reign of the Galactic Empire, Lortan fanatics virtually wiped them out in an onslaught known as the Reslian Purge. The Empire intervened to save the Tunroth from total annihilation, and the Tunroth came to greatly respect the galactic government. The species slowly recovered, as expatriate Tunroth returned home to help rebuild their civilization. The system joined the Empire, although some members resisted the Emperor's anti-alien policies as members of the Rebel Alliance. After the transition from Galactic Empire to New Republic, the Tunroth remained wary of the new government but eventually joined it.

== Tusken Raider ==
Often referred to as Sand People (or "Tuskens"), these nomadic desert inhabitants roam the Jundland Wastes on the planet Tatooine, and play a major role in Anakin Skywalker's backstory.

== Twi'lek ==
Twi'leks are humanoids easily distinguished by the twin tentacular appendages that protrude from the back of the head. These prehensile appendages, known as "head-tails", "lekku" or "tchun-tchin," are advanced organs used for communication and cognitive functions (similar to those of Togrutas). The Twi'lek's name means Twin Lekku. Like humans, Twi'leks vary greatly in appearance and have a wide variety of skin colors including shades of white, blue, green and red. Adult Twi'leks stand between 1.6 and 2.1 meters tall.

Twi'leks speak Twi'leki, a language that combines verbal components with subtle head-tail movements. When they wish, they can even communicate in complete secrecy using their versatile head-tails.

Young female Twi'leks are graceful and beautiful, and are highly sought as dancers or slaves, often sold by their own family members for profit.

They are one of the few species that can procreate with humans.

Twi'leks are native to mountainous Ryloth in the Outer Rim.

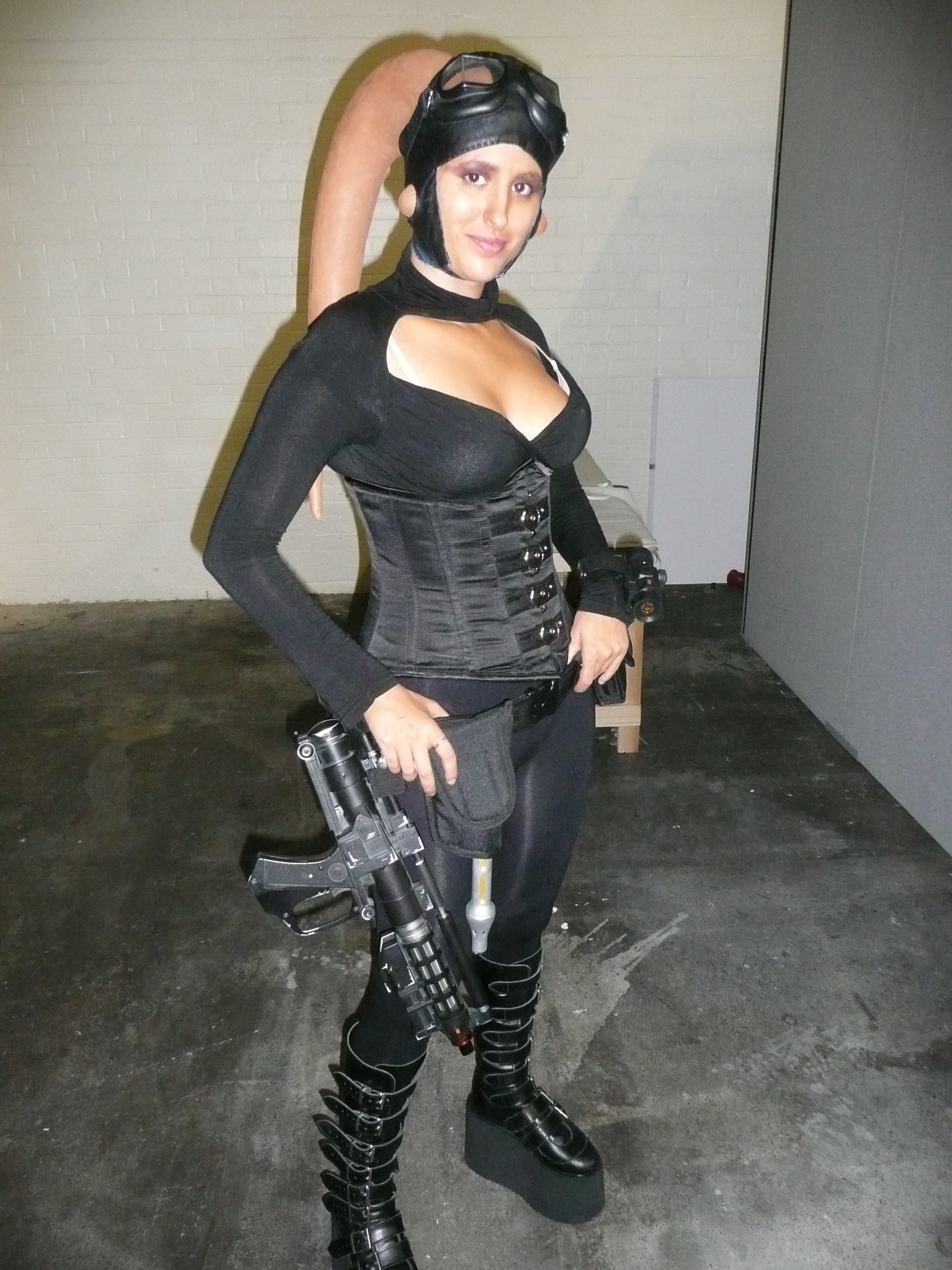
Twi'lek cosplayer

=== Legends ===
Because of Ryloth's synchronous rotation, half of the world is trapped in perpetual darkness, while the other half remains scorched by the sun. The Twi'leks inhabit a thin band of twilight between these two extremes, living in sprawling catacomb cities just below the planet's surface. They have a relatively primitive industrial civilization, and survive on a diet of raw fungi and cow-like rycrits. Because Ryloth is relatively defenseless, the planet has long been the target of off-world slavers.

Twi'leks adhere to a familial clan government organized around a series of head clans with their own city on Ryloth, each consisting of five members who are born into the position. Head clans are responsible for all community decisions, but the position also has a heavy price: When one member of a clan government dies, the remaining four leaders are exiled into Ryloth's uninhabitable Bright Lands, allowing the next generation of clan leaders to assume their rightful place. Religiously, the species worships a single female deity.

Ryloth's harsh environment and turbulent history have forged Twi'leks into tough survivors. Twi'leks are calculating and pragmatic and try their best to avoid getting involved in other beings' conflicts, preferring instead to stay out of the way and wait out conflicts in relative safety where they can watch, plan, and prepare to make a profit from the outcome. Generally nonviolent, they typically use their intelligence and cunning to achieve their goals or resolve conflicts. Noble Twi'leks may seem stoic or even aloof, while less scrupulous members of the species can be considered ruthless and manipulative.

=== Canon ===
In Star Wars: The Clone Wars, when the Separatists captured Ryloth, two clones found a young Twi'lek named Numa, who took them around Ryloth and showed them her destroyed home. After the clones removed their helmets to prove they were humans and not droids, she started calling them "Neera". When the clones asked Obi-Wan Kenobi what that meant he replied, "Neera, it means brother." In Star Wars Rebels it is revealed that Numa has joined Hera Syndulla's father (Cham Syndulla, who was also helping the clones years ago) in an anti-imperial resistance group, and has donned the names of the two clones on her armor (Waxer and Boil).

Twi'leks are given French accents at the behest of George Lucas, as homage to the French Resistance during WWII.

=== Known Twi'leks ===
Jedi Knight Aayla Secura (Battlefront II) and Master Zhar Lestin (Knights of the Old Republic) are Twi'leks. Rianna Saren in the video game Star Wars: Lethal Alliance is a Twi'lek. Twi'leks were one of the species playable in Star Wars: Galaxies, where they were given bonuses in the Entertainer skill set.

Twi'leks such as Bib Fortuna and Oola were first seen in Jabba the Hutt's lair in Return of the Jedi (1983). Lyn Me was digitally added to the scenes in the Special Edition (1997). Twi'leks are never named in the Star Wars movies, and in the game Star Wars: X-Wing there is a planet called Twi'lek, most likely Ryloth.

Game designers Bill Slavicsek and Grant Boucher invented the name Twi'lek for the Galaxy Guide 1: A New Hope supplement for the Star Wars: The Roleplaying Game from West End Games.

BioWare's 2003 video game Star Wars: Knights of the Old Republic features the young Twi'lek Mission Vao who accompanied the player on his search for the Star Forge 3956 BBY together with her Wookiee friend Zaalbar. The 2011 MMORPG Star Wars: The Old Republic, also by BioWare, features Vette, a Twi'lek pirate who is a companion character and slave to the Sith Warrior.

In Michael A. Stackpole's award-winning X-wing series, a Twi'lek pilot named Nawara Ven is a former Imperial defense attorney who defected to the New Republic when he was unable to seek justice for his clients in Palpatine's humanocentric court system. In Rogue Squadron, Ven makes his first appearance as an X-wing pilot in the squadron reorganized by Commander Wedge Antilles. In Wedge's Gamble, he assists the Republic in retaking the galactic capital Coruscant. In The Krytos Trap, Ven defends Captain Tycho Celchu, when he is charged with treason and the murder of Lieutenant Corran Horn. In The Bacta War, Ven is injured in battle and he retires from piloting. In the end, he becomes the squadron's executive officer.

In Star Wars Rebels Hera Syndulla is a Twi'lek who pilots the Ghost. She is the daughter of Cham Syndulla, a character who first appeared in The Clone Wars animated series. She later appears in Star Wars: Squadrons as General Hera Syndulla, leader of Project Starhawk.

The book Light of the Jedi, written by Charles Soule and part of The High Republic series, introduced Loden Greatstorm, a Jedi Master of the Jedi Order. He is a Rutian Twi'lek born on Ryloth during the High Republic era."Databank: Loden Greatstorm"

== Tynnan ==
Tynnans are a beaver-like race from Tynna. They have an unusual kind of government, in which new governors were randomly picked through a lottery. They also greatly care about their world's environment and take precautions with technology to insure they won't harm said environment. An amphibious race, Tynnans are competent swimmers and virtually all their settlements are near bodies of water, plus have water-themed entertainment. They have a layer of blubber to keep them warm while in the frigid waters, but this made wearing clothes discomforting, so they usually go around naked (though they will wear belts at least).

The species debuted in the Han Solo Trilogy novel Han Solo's Revenge.

== See also ==
- List of Star Wars species (A–E)
- List of Star Wars species (F–J)
- List of Star Wars species (K–O)
- List of Star Wars species (U–Z)
