= Mon Calamari =

In the Star Wars universe, Mon Calamari may refer to:

- The Mon Calamari (fictional race), amphibious humanoids
- Mon Calamari (fictional planet) (or Mon Cala, or Dac), their homeworld
