= D'an =

D'an refers to:

- Figrin D'an, a fictional Star Wars character who is the leader of Figrin D'an and the Modal Nodes and brother of Barquin D'an
- Barquin D'an, a fictional Star Wars character who is Figrin D'an's older brother and member of the Max Rebo Band
