= Kalmar (disambiguation) =

Kalmar is a city in Småland, Sweden.

Kalmar may also refer to:

- Kalmar Airport, Sweden
- Kalmar County, Sweden
- Kalmar Municipality, Sweden
- Kalmar Union, a Scandinavian political union of the Middle Ages
- Kalmar Verkstad, a Swedish train and automobile manufacturer
- Kalmar, Iran, a village in Mazandaran Province, Iran
- Kalmar (surname), several people

Also:

- Kalmar, a division of Cargotec manufacturing machines for ports

== See also ==
- Calmar (disambiguation)
