= Calmar =

Calmar can refer to:

- Calmar (planthopper), a genus of planthoppers
- Calmar, Iowa, United States, a town in Winneshiek County, Iowa
- Calmar, Alberta, Canada
- Calmar ratio, a calculation of investment performance

== See also ==
- Calamar (disambiguation)
- Kalmar (disambiguation)
