= Calamar =

Calamar may refer to:

- Calamar, Guaviare, a town and municipality in Guaviare Department, Colombia
- Calamar, Bolívar, a town and municipality in Bolívar Department, Colombia
- Calamar (crater), on Mars
- Calamar (telenovela), a Colombian telenovela

== See also ==
- Calamari (disambiguation)
- Calmar (disambiguation)
