= List of Star Wars species (F–J) =

This is a list of Star Wars humanoid alien sentient species, containing the names of fictional species from the Star Wars franchise beginning with the letters F through J. For Star Wars humans, see Star Wars humans. Star Wars is an American epic space opera film series created by George Lucas. The first film in the series, Star Wars, was released on May 25, 1977, and became a worldwide pop culture phenomenon, followed by five sequels and three prequels. Many species of alien creatures (often humanoid) are depicted. For the other species listed alphabetically, see the following:

- List of Star Wars species (A–E)
- List of Star Wars species (K–O)
- List of Star Wars species (P–T)
- List of Star Wars species (U–Z)

== Falleen ==
The Falleen are a race of human-like reptilian people originating from the world Falleen in the Mid Rim region within the Star Wars universe. They have the ability to change the hue of their skin to convey their emotional state and influence the emotional state of others. Both males and females of this race emit strong pheromones, easily attracting members of other humanoid species, irrespective of gender. Black Sun, a crime syndicate within the Mid Rim, was run by Falleen noblemen. A notable Legends villain from this race is Prince Xizor. Another major villain was Darth Karrid of the Old Republic.

== Far-Outsiders ==
Far-Outsiders is the cryptic code-name given by the Chiss who inhabit the edges of the galaxy (an example of one being Grand Admiral Thrawn of the Empire), for the extra-galactic alien force that began assaulting the Unknown Regions in the years during the Galactic Civil War. They are probably the Yuuzhan Vong, who launched a siege on the galaxy from 25 to 30 ABY (After the Battle of Yavin). The name "Far-Outsiders" is also used by the inhabitants of Zonama Sekot to describe the invaders that attacked their planet. The Far-Outsiders are referred to in the singular, but the Chiss named "Stent" once told Mara Jade that there were "a hundred different threats out there that would freeze your blood if you knew about them. The Ruling Families can't stop them; neither can any power in the region.", suggesting that the term "Far-Outsiders" may apply to any unknown hostile race originating from outside the galaxy.

== Feeorin ==
Nym, a pirate from various Star Wars computer games (including the MMORPG "Star Wars Galaxies") was a Feeorin. It is said that Feeorins only grow stronger with age. Their homeworld was Odryn for a period of time in the Old Republic era when the oldest and strongest Feeorin was chosen as their leader. The controversial Jedi master Feln was a Feeorin leader. It has been stated in several Star Wars novels and comics that there are only roughly one million Feeorins left in the galaxy, suggesting a decline from a larger number.

== Ferroans ==
Not a well-known species, the only references to Ferroans appear in Force Heretic 1–3 and Rogue Planet. They have icy blue skin, white-toned hair, and live on Zonama Sekot, a living planet. The planet provides them with fleshy habitats constructed of its own mass.

== Firrerreo ==
The Firrerreo are a species of near-humans from the planet Firrerre. They have two-toned hair and golden skin. In their culture, if someone says a Firrerreo's name, the Firrerreo would be forced to serve the speaker, as saying a Firrerreo's name was a form of power.

They no longer live on Firrerre; after the poisoning of their world by the Empire, they were loaded onto massive colony ships for a journey to another world. One of their own, a Force-sensitive named Hethrir, betrayed his people at the command of Darth Vader. After the deaths of Darth Vader and Palpatine, Hethrir returned and intercepted the colony ships. He disengaged the drives and left the sleeping Firrerre to drift in space. He plundered the ships for the valuable equipment on board and took the children to sell as slaves. Hethrir kidnapped the children of Han Solo and Princess Leia Organa Solo; Anakin and the twins Jacen and Jaina. Han was on a mission at the time and did not know of the kidnappings, so Princess Leia set out to find them herself. On her quest, she stumbled upon the drifting colony ships. She asked one of the two awake Firrerre if he wanted to be freed, but he said that they would reengage the drive, heading towards the planet selected for them by the Emperor years before. They were considered extinct by the Yuuzhan Vong War, but, 15 years later, they were just considered scattered.

== Fosh ==
The Fosh are a sentient avian species. They are first mentioned in the Star Wars: The New Jedi Order series. The only Fosh mentioned in all the Star Wars books was the Jedi Knight Vergere.

The Fosh never had a large population on their planet, which prevented them from becoming as influential a race as humans are in the Star Wars universe.

Fosh females have preternaturally developed tear ducts, used for mating purposes on their homeworld. The Jedi Vergere, with the aid of the Force, can further alter her tears to secrete anything from an extremely potent anesthetic to a powerful antidote such as the one that cured Mara Jade Skywalker after she was infected with a deadly Yuuzhan Vong disease.

The only known Fosh, a female Jedi Knight named Vergere, is also mentioned during Anakin Skywalker's time on Zonoma Sekot, as he recalls a flashback of her. Her call is what brought Obi-Wan and Anakin to the planet in the first place, although they can find no trace of her, and instead hear of mysterious invaders. The description of Vergere falls in line with the description of her when she returns with the Yuuzhan Vong, and is the same Vergere that disappeared from Zonoma Sekot.

== Gamorrean ==
A Gamorrean is a large pig-like humanoid. The creatures have little intelligence and are often hired as guards, notably by Jabba the Hutt, who was fond of hiring them due to their low cost. On their home planet, Gamorreans exist in a sort of tribal political system dominated by the female sows. The males train for massive tribal conflicts that take place each year. The first time a space ship landed on Gamorr, the various tribes fought for days over who would win the right to approach it. The winning side eventually battered the vessel to pieces. Entries regarding the Gamorrean homeworld in travel guides simply read "DO NOT GO TO GAMORR!"

Physically, Gamorreans appear in Return of the Jedi as greenish, slimy (and apparently smelly) pig-like creatures. They are about 1.8 metres (5 ft 11 in) tall and weigh about 100 kilograms (220 lb). Underneath their pig-like snouts, protruding from jowled cheeks, are yellowed tusks. These complement the small, yellow horns the Gamorreans have growing from the top of their heads. These creatures appear in a picture released by the creator of the show The Mandalorian, Jon Favreau, to promote the release of season 2 of the show coming out in fall of 2020. A few Gammoreans also feature prominently in The Book of Boba Fett.

Howard Stern has referred frequently to "Gamorrean Guard", a person interviewed by Gary Garver at a Star Wars convention.

== Gand ==
Gands are insectoids who evolved on the planet Gand. There are two main sub-species of Gands: those with lungs, which are very rare, and those without. Gands with lungs are adapted to Gand's ammonia-rich atmosphere, but they are poisoned by oxygen and must use a special breathing apparatus if they want to leave Gand. Gands without lungs have special regeneration properties, demonstrated by their ability to recover quickly from injuries and even regrow lost limbs (As shown by Ooryl Qrygg in the X-wing series by Michael Stackpole).

Gands are not allowed to use personal pronouns unless they have achieved something extraordinary. A young or underachieving Gand talks about himself or herself in third person and calls themselves "Gand". If a Gand achieves something notable, they can use their family's surname, but will still use the third person. A second, more impressive feat allows the heroic Gand to choose a first name for himself. Only the best-known Gands are allowed to use the first person, and then only after their aptitude has been audited by a jury, in what is called a janwuine-jika, after which they are declared janwuine. However, should a Gand be ashamed of their deeds, they would "reduce" their name when talking about themselves.

Many Gands choose a strange profession, the Findsman. A Findsman is a shaman as well as a police officer. The Findsman will interpret the shapes of gases and make prophecies, usually about fugitives. Then, the Findsman will track the fugitive to bring him to justice. During the reign of the Empire, some Findsmen became bounty hunters.

One of the best-known Gands is Zuckuss, who was a bounty hunter employed by Darth Vader to hunt down Han Solo, and was at one time the assistant to Bossk. Another well known Gand is Ooryl Qrygg, a pilot in Rogue Squadron, and a very good friend of Corran Horn, both of whom are characters in the book I, Jedi. Ooryl lacked lungs and therefore did not need a mask for normal oxygen environments. He became so honored among Gands that he was given the honor of referring to himself in the first person. It is apparent, based on Corran's observations, that if Ooryl was troubled or distressed he would speak in the third person until the problem was solved. An example of such an occurrence would be when Corran and Ooryl were in the mess hall on a Mon Calamari cruiser: Ooryl, in mid-conversation, began speaking in the third person, and Corran immediately noticed something was troubling him, with the author (who narrates from Corran's point of view) noting that Ooryl only did this when something was bothering him.

== Gank ==
Also known as "Gank Killers" due to their volatile nature, Ganks are a sentient cyborg species. Ganks are seldom seen without their body-covering armor. Many are found working for Hutts on Nar Shaddaa, but there are other Ganks living in other places besides "The Smuggler's Moon". It is also quite common for Ganks to wear armor that represents the planet they live on or the faction they fight for. They are brutal killers that will annihilate anything that gets in their way. There is a story, however, of an encounter a group of Ganks had with the Jedi Master Mace Windu. Surrounded by 14 Ganks, Master Windu simply touched his lightsaber hilt and the Ganks dropped their weapons to the ground.

== Gen'Dai ==
These large humanoids are encased in heavy armor most of the time, which serves as their exoskeleton. Their nervous and circulatory systems make them extremely resilient. Their nervous system is composed of thousands of clusters allowing them to regenerate limbs and pull nearby limbs back onto their bodies. This unusual nervous system gives them Jedi-like reflexes. They also lack a central heart. They have an advanced vascular system that circulates blood. They lack vital organs making them nearly invulnerable to attack. These odd nervous and circulatory systems may be the cause of their astonishingly long lifespans. There were some Gen'Dai reported to have lived for more than 4,000 years.

The most well known Gen'Dai was Durge. He was one of Count Dooku's lieutenants and also one of the rare cases of "violent Gen'Dai". Durge fought and bested a young Boba Fett in combat but was later beaten on Muunilinst by Obi-Wan Kenobi, before being killed in space by Anakin Skywalker near the end of the Clone Wars (Anakin trapped Durge in an escape pod then used the Force to guide it into a nearby star).

== Geonosian ==
The Geonosians are an insectoid species native to the planet Geonosis, a barren rocky world that is home to thousands of factories geared towards mechanical construction. Many of the galaxy's biggest manufacturing concerns hold contracts with the Geonosians. Geonosians reside in hive colonies in organic-looking spires. George Lucas thought of the creatures as termite-like in terms of how their society formed, including their architecture. All Geonosians have a hard exoskeleton, elongated faces, multi-jointed limbs, and speak in a strange clicking language known as Geonosian. There are two main types of Geonosian: the wingless drones that mostly work as laborers, and the winged aristocrats, which includes royal warriors serving as scouts and providing security to the hive. They look down on their wingless cousins. In Star Wars: The Clone Wars, it is revealed that the Geonosian Queen Karina the Great uses a kind of "brain worm" to ensure the loyalty of other Geonosians. This mind control exists even after the host's death, although the "Geonosian zombies" have pure white eyes.

Geonosians do not have a standing military, although they do arm themselves with sonic blasters and static pikes. They instead use their droid foundries to build armies for corporate interests wealthy enough to afford them like the Trade Federation and the Techno Union. The Geonosians are also the ones who developed the Death Star plans, leading to the race being mostly enslaved under Imperial occupancy as the Death Star itself was being built. (As seen in Star Wars: Empire at War) But as revealed in Star Wars Rebels two-part episode "Ghost of Geonosis", the Geonosians were nearly driven to extinction by the Empire to ensure the secrecy of the Death Star as it was nearing completion, and moved to an undisclosed location. Only a Geonosian nicknamed "Klik-Klak" and a queen egg appear to remain on Geonosis.

Poggle the Lesser was a Geonosian who appeared in Episode II and oversaw the production of battle droids for the Trade Federation and later provided the bulk of the troops for the Confederacy of Independent Systems. He was decapitated by Darth Vader on Mustafar in Episode III. In the video game Star Wars Battlefront II, the player must fight a Geonosian who is trying to use the droid factories on Mustafar to create his own army. He was named Gizor Delso.

Geonosians make a unique appearance in Lego Star Wars: The Video Game, appearing with one of two weapons (either their characteristic sonic blaster or a normal blaster rifle) randomly, beyond the player's control.

== Givin ==
The Givin are from the planet Yag'Dhul and are often found doing starship repair work because of their exoskeleton, which allows them to withstand depressurization; this vacuum-resistance allows them to resist many forms of deadly gases. Givin are renowned for their extensive knowledge of anything that has to do with numbers, and often are regarded as some of the best mathematicians in the galaxy.

== Gizka ==
Gizka are a species of small amphibious creatures, appearing in the video game Star Wars: Knights of the Old Republic. Whatever their native world, their extraordinary reproduction rate led to a fair amount of Gizka on many worlds, even including uncharted planets such as Rakata Prime, finding their way from the wreckage of crashed starships. It has been alternatively postulated that they came from that planet originally, spreading along with the Infinite Empire. Their exponential population growth led to them being considered pests on almost as many worlds as they inhabited.

The Ebon Hawk once played host to a temporary colony of Gizka, in an incident involving mishandled cargo, an Aqualish, and a Tatooine shipping company. To get rid of them the Gizka were given poison and when they attacked other Gizka they passed on the disease exterminating the population. (Alternatively, the gizka can be sold or given to a Selkath "petting zoo" on the water planet of Manaan.)

The Gizka are a tribute to the popular Star Trek episode, "The Trouble with Tribbles".

== Glymphid ==
The Glymphid are a race of amphibian aliens with a rod-thin build, suction cup-tipped digits, and a long proboscis. Notable Glymphids include the podracer Aldar Beedo.

== Gorax ==
The Goraxes are a race of behemoths from the forest moon of Endor. They can grow up to more than 98 feet in height and dwell on high crags far from the forests of the forest moon. They are mentioned in the Illustrated Star Wars Universe book and one appears as an antagonist in the Caravan of Courage: An Ewok Adventure movie. They are humanoid, with primate-like faces and narrow chins, as well as enormous ears which are highly sensitive to noises made by small animals. They communicate through grumbling noises. The Goraxes wear fur clothes. They are primitive and powerful and frequently make raids on Ewok villages, where they smash through walls and kidnap Ewoks for pets, although the Goraxes usually forget to feed them or crush the unfortunate Ewoks. They hunt at night, since their eyes are sensitive to bright light. The Gorax is solitary and usually doesn't run into others. The only bond it has is with its pet boar wolves.

== Gran ==
The Gran (also known as Kinyenians) are a three-eyed alien race, 1.5 to 1.8 meters in height. They are native to the planet Kinyen, though they have colonies across the galaxy, such as on the planets Hok and Malastare. They are characterized by three eyes on stalks, a protruding, goat-like mouth, and orange skin. One Gran named Mawhonic was a notable podracer. Gran had a great deal of power within the Galactic Senate, during the later years of the Old Republic. However, by the time the Emperor's reign descended over the galaxy Gran became less prominent, and suffered from Imperial oppression.

In the series The Clone Wars, two senators, Senator Kharrus and Senator Philo, make one-episode appearances. They are both killed. Kharrus died in a shuttle crash, and Philo was shot in the back by Cad Bane.

In the Expanded Universe, most notably in the video games, Grans have become one of the most prominent enemies the player has to face, which is seen in the Dark Forces/Jedi Knight games.

== Gree ==
The Gree were a six-tentacled race of cephalopod creatures that had an unusual anatomy with gray skin, large sad-looking eyes along with tall foreheads. These features supported an immense brain sac which flopped oddly behind their heads.

== Grizmallt ==
The Grizmallt are the original settlers of Naboo.

In the final days of her life, Queen Tasia personally sponsored the last such expedition. With the blessing of a famous Jedi Master, the colony ship Beneficent Tasia and its support starships, Constant and Mother Vima, left Grizmallt in search of fortune and glory. The expedition targeted the galaxy's dangerous southern quadrant, then home to a handful of settlements. On Grizmallt, Queen Tasia's dying wish was that this last expedition would find a home deep within unexplored space. Shortly after she perished, however, the Beneficent Tasia also went silent.

The inhabitants of Grizmallt assumed that Beneficent Tasia had been lost, but the starship did, in fact, survive the many hazards of unknown space. Although severely damaged and unable to contact Grizmallt, the expedition eventually reached Naboo's orbit. As if guided by Tasia's last wish, the settlers discovered that Naboo was a pastoral, peaceful world rich in natural resources and quite capable of supporting human life. In approximately 3900 BBY (Before the Battle of Yavin), the Grizmallt colonists crash landed on Naboo to stay.

Within weeks of their arrival, the settlers encountered the Gungans, the planet's native sentient species. Although immediately distrustful of one another, neither species attacked the other and the humans were allowed to establish their first settlement without incident. Over the next several decades, the settlers slowly spread across the planet's largest landmass, building cities and villages to support their growing numbers. The human colonists kept to the grassy plains and ocean coastlines, only occasionally treading into Gungan territory. Despite this, tension between the humans and the Gungans remained strong.

Gungans named the human settlers as "Naboo" , the Gungan word for "foolish" or "plainsfolk" as the humans settled on the dry grassy northern plains of the planet which the indigenous Gungans considered foolish, being undesirably dry and hostile to their way of life. The amphibious Gungans dwell in the southern wet swamplands, lakes and seas of the planet.

== Grysk / Yuuzhan Vong ==
Initially introduced as the Yuuzhan Vong in the book series The New Jedi Order (1999–2003), the species were an extragalactic, technophobic, fanatically religious species who were intent upon conquering the galaxy, which they attempted during the Yuuzhan Vong War (25–29 ABY). They were both invisible to direct Force sight and unaffected by direct Force powers. The Yuuzhan Vong used biotechnology instead of mechanical technology. Their homeworld was at first in a different galaxy and was called Yuuzhan'tar, which was destroyed in the Cremlevian War. Some went to a seed that was produced from the ashes of Yuuzhan'Tar which was first seen by people in the Unknown Regions and was called Zonama Sekot. Others went to Coruscant, which they renamed Yuuzhan'tar upon conquering the planet in 27 ABY, ending the New Republic.

The Yuuzhan Vong believed that all other races were little more than barbarians who were not fit to live in their presence. Because of this the Vong attempted to conquer the universe with little thought to the damage they were doing to the universe or its inhabitants. The only race the Vong saw as a threat, or as close to a threat as they were willing to believe, were Wookiees. They saw them as fierce warriors and felt that they deserved to live. For this reason, the Vong enslaved Wookiees rather than attempting to destroy them.

After the fall of Coruscant, the scattered New Republic's troops reorganized and joined forces with the Imperial Remnant (established in 12 ABY) to form the Galactic Federation of Free Alliances (or simply Galactic Alliance) in 28 ABY, which managed to defeat the Yuuzhan Vong and drive them back to the Unknown Regions in 29 ABY.

The invasion is coming, Lord Vader. But I have now bought the Empire time to prepare.

— Grand Admiral Thrawn, to Darth Vader

Canon

After the October 2012 acquisition of Lucasfilm by Disney, the Yuuzhan Vong were declared non-canonical in April 2014. In their stead, the film Star Wars: The Force Awakens (2015) introduced the First Order, a faction that arose from one of many Imperial Remnants between 5 and 21 ABY, and eventually destroyed the New Republic in 34 ABY, while the Resistance (formed in 28 ABY) continued to fight against the First Order. A canonical version of the Yuuzhan Vong, now known as the Grysk, were introduced in the Timothy Zahn novel Thrawn: Alliances (2018). Both species are described as having sloping foreheads and skull-like faces, and being a threat to the Chiss Ascendancy hailing from the Unknown Regions and enslaving other races, though the Grysk use conventional mechanical technology rather than biotechnology, as the novel is set in an earlier time frame than the previous non-canonical Legends novels.

== Gungan ==
The Gungans, also known as Goongas, have humanoid amphibious bodies, but their heads are elongated with large, dangling fin-like ears. They are amphibian in blood and seem to have evolved from frogs and toads, given their incredible jumping. They live in underwater cities on the planet Naboo. The principal Gungan character in the movies is Jar Jar Binks; the ruler of the Gungans is Boss Nass. Boss Nass is an Ankura, a subspecies of Gungan. The only other Gungans to be given a name in the films are Captain Tarpals and Augara Jowil, though the novelization also mentions a General Ceel and The Yellow Dart. Other games have shown other leaders including Boss Gallo.

The Gungans and the Naboo (human inhabitants of Naboo) did not get along, as the Gungans believed the Naboo to be pompous cowards, while the Naboo believed the Gungans to be barbarians. This attitude lasted until Queen Amidala united the Gungans and Naboo to fight the Trade Federation in the Battle of Naboo. (Note: According to George Lucas, this battle is meant to represent a clash between a primitive society and a more advanced one, similar to the Vietnam War.) After the Battle of Naboo, the Gungans attained representation in the Senate through Representative Jar Jar Binks, who became very close friends with Senator Padmé Amidala.

The Gungans reproduce sexually; although they seem androgynous, the males tend to be taller and more muscular than the females, who usually tie their long ears back.

Gungans ride the Kaadu, and maintain the Fambaa both are amphibious creatures.

== Habassa ==
The only mention of the Habassa is in the X-Wing video game. They originate from the planet Habassa II which was enslaved by the Empire. After the Battle of Yavin, they joined the Alliance.

== Hapan ==
The Hapans are the people of the Hapes Cluster and the Hapes Consortium. The Hapes Cluster is very bright, so Hapans' vision at night is not as good as other humans. Though similar to humans, they are known for being beautiful, especially the women. The women are also the dominant sex. Hapans speak the Hapan language.

== Harch ==
The Harch were sentient spider-like species from Secundus Ando. Admiral Trench of the Star Wars: the Clone Wars series is of this race.

== Herglic ==
Herglics were a cetacean-like species similar to whaladons. They originated from Giju.

== Himoran ==
The Himorans share an ancient lineage with Bothans, thus are similar in appearance, though significantly taller. Hailing from the massive planet Himora, these sentients are a primitive people, their homeworld having been long neglected by larger existing governments. Himorans are exceptional in that their population contains an unusually large number of Force-sensitive individuals, expected to number more than 7,000.

== H'nemthean ==
H'nemtheans are reptilian humanoids, from the planet H'nemthe, have four conelets and double cheekbones, resulting in ridges of bone and skin on their faces. The hornlets are sensitive to both emotion and temperature. When a female H'nemthe consummates her relationship with a male, she eviscerates him with her knife-shaped tongue, strangely considering it a proof of love. This odd ritual is most likely a result of the fact that there are 20 males to every female on their home planet.

== Hssiss ==
Hssiss were large dragon-like creatures that appeared on Korriban. Members of this species are shrouded with the dark side and feature large armor plating on the dorsal region. These creatures have a strong connection with the Force and an ability to become invisible. In the Xbox game Knights of the Old Republic II: The Sith Lords, they guarded the skeletal remains of what was left of the old Sith Academy. If one were to search the remains of a Sith, Hssiss would come out of nowhere and attack them. They are formidable and are immune to certain force powers.

== Humans ==
With the same general appearance, abilities, biology, behaviors, and other attributes as real-life humans, humans in the Star Wars universe are the most dominant species in the galaxy. However, some of them, along with certain members of the countless humanoid species, have a connection with The Force, allowing certain additional abilities such as superhuman strength, telepathy, and telekinesis.

== Hutt ==
Hutts are a long-lived gastropoid species. They are crime lords that control territory in the Outer Rim. They originated on Varl, but now claim Nal Hutta as their homeworld. Of them, Jabba the Hutt is perhaps the most famous, appearing in The Phantom Menace, A New Hope, and Return of the Jedi (where he was the first major antagonist). Ziro the Hutt (who is Jabba's uncle) is probably the second most well-known, as he is prominently featured in Star Wars: The Clone Wars. Gardulla the Hutt is mentioned in The Phantom Menace as the former slave owner of Anakin and Shmi Skywalker before losing a podracing bet to Toydarian junk dealer Watto; she also appears as a member of the Hutt Council in The Clone Wars. Durga the Hutt and Jiliac the Hutt are prominently featured as rival crime lords in The Han Solo Trilogy, and Jabba's father, Zorba the Hutt, is featured prominently in the Jedi Prince series.

Despite evidence of sexual deviance, Hutts are actually asexual, and choose when to give birth, as described in the second Han Solo trilogy and the Clone Wars novel.

== Iktotchi ==
The Iktotchi are an alien race located in a remote system in the Expansion Region, next to the Corellian Run, along with neighboring planet Aridus. They have a tough, hairless, and often reddish skin, as well as two downward-sloping horns on the sides of the head.

One famous Iktotchi is Jedi Master Saesee Tiin, who sat on the Jedi Council.

== Ithorian ==
Ithorians are a species of intelligent herbivores from the planet Ithor. They are commonly called "Hammerheads" because of their long, curving neck and T-shaped head.

Ithorians are natives of the planet Ithor, a lush world with sprawling rain forests. The Ithorians worship Mother Jungle and long ago vowed never to desecrate their planet. Once they discovered repulsorlift technology, the Ithorians built expansive "herd cities" floating in the skies above their home world. The species migrated to these platforms, ensuring that Ithor would remain pristine forever. However, the Yuuzhan Vong destroyed their planet when the second in command released a plague that turned everything into a black sludge.

Abroad, Ithorians have integrated well with the intergalactic community. Their own language is difficult for non-Ithorians to learn, as the Ithorians have twin mouths on opposite sides of their necks. However, they are able speak Basic, albeit with an accent. Their vocal cords are strong enough to produce a sound shockwave used in defense to stop an enemy in its tracks.

Ithorian Roron Corobb was a Jedi Master who died protecting Chancellor Palpatine from General Grievous during the Clone Wars.

Momaw Nadon, an exiled Ithorian, was present in the Mos Eisley Cantina in A New Hope.

As seen in Star Wars: Knights of the Old Republic, Ithorians were also instrumental in the restoration of the planet Telos after it was destroyed by Sith during the Jedi Civil War. An Ithorian named Chodo Habat employed the help of a Jedi Exile during the Telos Restoration Project with the promise that he would cure the exile's "wound in the Force" if the Jedi Exile foiled Czerka Corporation's attempts to take over the restoration project.

== Jawa ==
A Jawa with the spore of a sarlacc from "Fortune, Fate, and the Natural History of the Sarlacc", Star Wars Tales 6 (2000)

The Jawas are a pygmy rodent-like race inhabiting the desert planet of Tatooine. They are usually 1–1.5 m (3 ft 3 in – 4 ft 11 in) tall. They work as scavengers and tinkerers, picking up discarded or broken machinery and fixing it up to resell as well as stealing anything that catches their eye. Jawas are usually peaceful unlike Tusken Raiders, but may sometimes use ion blasters or other weapons to defend themselves. They are entirely covered in tan cloaks, with their faces hidden in hoods and only their glowing yellow or red eyes visible.

For transport in the desert world, they use long-abandoned mining Sandcrawlers. These lumbering giants can house a family unit as well as store cargo that they have collected on their journeys. Jawas belong to clans. Half of the clan works in the Sandcrawler, while the other half lives in desert fortresses made from wrecked spaceships for protection against Tusken Raiders and krayt dragons. They also serve as a home for the rest of the Jawa clan which stores the wealth gathered by the other family unit in the Sandcrawler. Jawas have a reputation with Tatooine locals for being swindlers and thieves.

Jawas appear briefly in Star Wars: Episode I – The Phantom Menace during the Boonta Eve Classic Podrace, and in Episode II – Attack of the Clones, giving directions to Anakin Skywalker. They also appear in Star Wars: A New Hope when they picked up C-3PO and R2-D2 and sold them to Owen Lars and Luke Skywalker, as well as multiple Jawas appearing among the riffraff in Jabba the Hutt's palace in Star Wars: Return of the Jedi. In A New Hope, the Jawas were portrayed by Jack Purvis (Chief Jawa), Mahjoub Zibotics, Mike Edmonds, Rusty Goffe, Penny McCarthy, and 12 children including producer Gary Kurtz' daughters Tiffany and Melissa Kurtz and stunt co-ordinator Peter Diamond's sons Frazer and Warwick Diamond (Dathcha and Ashkabadna), and voiced by Ben Burtt and Rick Victor. Two Jawas and a Sandcrawler are seen at the end of The Rise of Skywalker. Jawas also appear on the planet Arvala-7 in "Chapter 2: The Child", the second episode of the television series The Mandalorian, in which they are depicted with red eyes (recalling Ralph McQuarrie's concept art). Although their faces are never seen by viewers, they are described in The Mandalorian as being "very furry". Though Jawas are based upon Tatooine, some Jawas have left the planet and built up their civilizations elsewhere, such as the tribe on Arvala-7. Because Jawas enjoy scavenging, they tend to build their Sandcrawlers and engage in the same activities on other planets as they do on Tatooine.

Specialists studying the past of the Sand People of the Tusken Raiders also used the term Ghorfa to denote an earlier sedentary phase of their culture, and, lastly Kumumgah, for the earliest stratum of sentient civilization on the planet, believed by some to represent a common ancestry shared by the Tuskens and the Jawas.

== Jungle Felucian ==
The Jungle Felucians, more commonly referred to as the Felucians, were an amphibious sentient species native to the planet Felucia. Viewed as strange and unusual by other species, the Felucians possessed two sets of arms—one ending in four webbed digits, and the other in three dexterous fingers—as well as a head consisting of a thick mass of tendrils. Members of the species usually stood 1.9 meters tall and weighed ninety kilograms. The Felucians were naturally sensitive to the Force and were in tune with their home planet's ever-changing balance of that energy field. The Felucians possessed no advanced technology and lived a somewhat primitive lifestyle. Unlike many other primitive species, the Felucians were not divided into multiple tribes; rather, they were all members of a single tribe spanning the entirety of Felucia. However, the species did have strict class stratification. Three of their most prominent classes were the warriors, the shamans, and the chieftains.

== See also ==
- List of Star Wars species (A–E)
- List of Star Wars species (K–O)
- List of Star Wars species (P–T)
- List of Star Wars species (U–Z)
