= Max Rebo Band =

Fictional alien band

Concept art of the original Max Rebo Band by Ralph McQuarrie. From left to right: Max Rebo, Droopy McCool, and Sy Snootles

The Max Rebo Band is a fictional alien swing music band in the Star Wars franchise, first appearing in the 1983 film Return of the Jedi as a trio performing the song "Lapti Nek" for crime lord Jabba the Hutt. The original lineup consisted of the blue-skinned Ortolan organist Max Rebo, the plump Kitonak woodwind player Droopy McCool, and Pa'lowick lead singer Sy Snootles, while additional members were inserted into the later-edited Special Edition of the film. A great deal of further information about the band and the personal histories of its members is found in various literature of the now non-canonical Star Wars Legends universe.

The group is classified as "jizz-wailers", which, according to the Star Wars Encyclopedia, refers to a "musician who plays a fast, contemporary, and upbeat style of music."

Max and Droopy were portrayed by actors in bodysuits, while Snootles was operated by two puppeteers stationed above and beneath the set. For the 1997 Special Edition of Return of the Jedi, the original Snootles puppet was replaced with a computer-generated version, and nine new band members were added with live actors and computer animation digitally composited into new and existing footage. "Lapti Nek" was additionally replaced with a new track titled "Jedi Rocks".

== Appearances ==
=== Film ===
The Max Rebo Band made their debut in Return of the Jedi during the scenes set in Jabba's palace on Tatooine. In the original version, the trio performs a pop song in Huttese titled "Lapti Nek" (Huttese for "Fancy Man"); the English lyrics (by composer John Williams's son Joseph Williams) are about dancing; Hardware Wars creator Ernie Fosselius helped arrange the song. The track was replaced in the Special Edition with "Jedi Rocks", written by jazz musician Jerry Hey and described in the Star Wars Databank as a "less-dated piece of music". (Note: "Lapti Nek" can also be heard as background music in canon audiobooks.)

In both versions of the film, the group follows the singing number with festive instrumental tunes, during which only Max is shown up close. The fate of the trio is unclear following the explosion of Jabba's sail barge after his attempted execution of Luke Skywalker, Han Solo, and Chewbacca.

Other versions of the song "Lapti Nek" exist, including a 12-inch club mix, a dub mix, and a cover by Meco—as well as a later recording by vocalist/lyric writer Joseph Williams as Urth, which incorporates lyrics he wrote for Return of the Jedi's "Ewok Celebration".

=== Literature ===
The original members of the Max Rebo Band make several appearances in Star Wars Expanded Universe literature. Max, Droopy, and Sy are featured in John Gregory Betancourt's short story And the Band Played On: The Band's Tale, from the 1995 anthology Tales from Jabba's Palace. According to the story, the band begins as a quartet called "Evar Orbus and His Galactic Jizz-wailers." They arrive on Tatooine in three years after the Battle of Yavin depicted in A New Hope, one year before the events of Return of the Jedi, for a gig at the Mos Eisley cantina, but regular in-house band, the Modal Nodes, objects to the presence of a second group, and Orbus is killed by Nodes leader Figrin D'an following a scuffle aboard an airbus.

Droopy and Sy elect Max as their new bandleader, and the trio secures an audition with Jabba the Hutt, who is pleased with their performance of "Lapti Nek". He offers the band a lifetime contract paid in food instead of money, much to Max's delight and Sy's disdain. However, the execution of Han, Luke, and Chewbacca at the Great Pit of Carkoon descends into chaos as Jabba is fatally strangled by Princess Leia, and the band escapes from Jabba's barge sans instruments just before it explodes. Droopy quits the group on the spot after wandering off into the desert to join fellow Kitonaks he hears playing in the distance, and Sy and Max join forces as the Max Rebo Duo. The book's epilogue describes the pair splitting up; Sy flops as a solo act while Max joins up with the Rebellion and uses his musical talents to entertain the troops.

=== Comics ===
In the 2000 Dark Horse release A Hot Time in the Cold Town Tonite!, Jabba sends the puzzled trio to the frozen planet Hoth to play for a rival crime lord, Bingo Mehndra, who threatens to feed the band to his pet Wampa if he suspected any kind of trickery. The group soon discovers that Jabba is actually using them as pawns in an assassination attempt against Bingo after they discover explosives hidden inside their speakers. They make their getaway by superimposing holograms of themselves from a past performance onto the stage, which Bingo realizes just as the explosives detonate. Though Jabba had blatantly endangered their lives, the band nonetheless chooses to avoid his wrath by returning to Tatooine.

In Dave Cooper's Stop That Jawa! (part of Star Wars Tales 2 published by Dark Horse Comics in 2000), the trio has their instruments "salvaged" by Jawa scavengers outside the Mos Eisley cantina. They are then pursued by a droid bounty hunter who earlier overheard Sy badmouthing Jabba in the cantina. The bounty hunter is revealed at the conclusion to be a Derfian musician named Tik Tali Talosh, who pressures the Jawas into returning the instruments before proclaiming his adoration of the group and requesting an audition.

=== Television ===
Max Rebo appears in the first, second, and fourth episodes of the television series The Book of Boba Fett, which takes place five years after Return of the Jedi. He was shown to have survived the destruction of Jabba's sail barge.

=== Other ===
The original band has made minor appearances in other Star Wars media. The unfinished 1982 David Tomblin mockumentary Return of the Ewok showed them in Jabba's palace, and they briefly appeared in an October 1985 episode of the animated series Star Wars: Droids titled "The Lost Prince", in which they performed in Doodnik's Café on the mining planet of Tyne's Horky. The trio also featured in the video games Star Wars: Demolition (2000) and Star Wars: Battlefront II (2005).

In May 2003, nearly six years after the rerelease of Return of the Jedi, Star Wars Insider published brief biographies of the band's new members for an article called "Jabbapalooza: Who's Who in the Max Rebo Band."

== Concept and creation ==
Star Wars creator George Lucas stated that the scene featuring the band was intended to be an elaborate production, but the crew "never really had the time" to film it. Lucas commented, "I thought [it] would be funny [to have a musical number] in the middle of a Star Wars film."

The original band members—Max, Sy, and Droopy—were puppets designed by Phil Tippett of Industrial Light and Magic's Creature Shop. Timothy D. Rose was the puppeteer for Sy. Lucas was not entirely pleased with the scene, saying that the puppets were too static and motionless. Special Edition producer Rick McCallum concurred that the requirements of the scene were too complex, even for animatronics.

For the 1997 rerelease of Return of the Jedi, Sy Snootles was recreated entirely in CGI and nine new musicians and dancers were added, while Max and Droopy's screen time during the segment was reduced in comparison to the original film. Visual effects supervisor Dave Carson described the process of creating Sy and new character Joh Yowza as similar to sculpting clay models, adding that CGI characters were more like puppets than cartoons and that animators "constantly find limitations: [the] characters don't bend right, or their mass isn't right," problems he claimed that confronted puppeteers.

In addition to the new characters, "Lapti Nek" was replaced with "Jedi Rocks." Lucas insisted that the revised sequence added more atmosphere and quality to the film.

== Original band members ==
Max Rebo Siiruulian Phantele
- Star Wars character
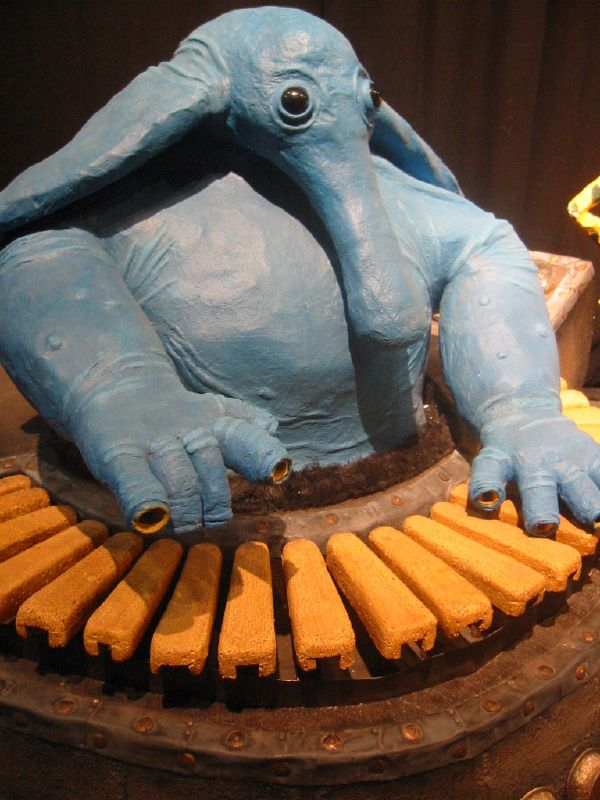
- Siiruulian Phantele performing as Max Rebo
- First appearance: Return of the Jedi (1983)
- Created by: George Lucas
- Portrayed by: Simon Williamson

In-universe information
- Full name: Siiruulian Phantele
- Species: Ortolan
- Gender: Male
- Affiliation: Max Rebo Band; Sanctuary
- Homeworld: Orto

Max Rebo is the stage name of Siiruulian Phantele, a stocky Ortolan keyboardist, and the eponymous leader of the Max Rebo Band. He plays a Red Ball Jett keyboard, which is similar to a circular reed organ with clavinet characteristics. Max was a founding member of Evar Orbus and His Galactic Jizz-wailers, but after Orbus's death, he was elected the group's new leader.

Like other Ortolans, Max is a glutton; he ecstatically accepts a lifetime contract from Jabba that is paid in endless meals instead of money, which angers the rest of the group. With their contract terminated following Jabba's demise, Max and Sy team up as the Max Rebo Duo in the wake of Droopy's departure. After performing for Lady Valarian, the pair splits. Max joins the Rebel Alliance to entertain the troops, one reason being that "the Rebellion has the best food." After the Galactic Civil War, he quits the music business and opens a chain of successful restaurants throughout the galaxy. He retires to a life of wealth and luxury on Coruscant.

In a nod to his physical appearance, Max's real name, Siiruulian Phantele, is a play on the words "cerulean elephant." He was portrayed by Simon Williamson in both versions of Return of the Jedi, and the character was a puppet constructed from the waist up by ILM.

Sy Snootles
- Star Wars character
- First appearance: Return of the Jedi (1983)
- Created by: George Lucas
- Portrayed by: Mike Quinn (puppeteer; ROTJ 1983 theatrical cut); Tim Rose (puppeteer; ROTJ 1983 theatrical cut)
- Voiced by: Annie Arbogast (voice; ROTJ 1983 theatrical cut); Nika Futterman (voice; Star Wars: The Clone Wars)

In-universe information
- Full name: Sy Snootles
- Species: Pa'lowick
- Gender: Female
- Affiliation: Hutt Clan; Max Rebo Band
- Homeworld: Lowick

Sy Snootles is a robust female Pa'lowick who is the lead vocalist and original member of the band. She had an affair with her Yuzzum groupie, Clayton. She is angered at Max's acceptance of Jabba's contract, and after attempts to rework the deal prove futile, Sy resorts to secretly spying for over a dozen of Jabba's enemies to earn credits, but then works as a double agent by giving them false information provided by Bib Fortuna. She was also not above getting her hands dirty when she killed Ziro the Hutt to obtain for Jabba a book containing dirt on the other Hutt leaders.

She teams up with Max as the Max Rebo Duo following Jabba's death and Droopy's departure from the band. Following a brief gig for Lady Valarian, Sy dissolves her relationship with Max and begins her solo career, but her subsequent recordings sell poorly and she is relegated to touring Outer Rim dives under different stage names.

During production, Sy Snootles' nickname was "Ms. Snooty." In the original version of the film, the character was a marionette-like puppet operated by puppeteers Mike Quinn and Tim Rose; Quinn was stationed on scaffolding and controlled her upper body, while Rose moved her legs from beneath the set. The character's oversized ruby lips were suggested by George Lucas, who referred to them as "Mick Jagger lips."

Sy was voiced in the original version of Jedi by Lucasfilm sound engineer Annie Arbogast, who also wrote the Huttese-language lyrics to "Lapti Nek." The track was recorded at Lucasfilm's Sprocket Systems (currently Skywalker Sound), and was even the recipient of a 1983 Apex Award. For close-up shots, Sy's mouth was articulated using a nearly-invisible wire connected to a microphone stand. The puppet was replaced with a computer-generated image for the Special Edition re-release. The CGI was spliced in with shots of the original puppet and created a continuity error with the puppet Sy's headdress feather appearing and disappearing during the film's first act.

In the Star Wars: The Clone Wars series, she is voiced by Nika Futterman.

Droopy McCool Snit
- Star Wars character
- First appearance: Return of the Jedi (1983)
- Created by: George Lucas
- Portrayed by: Deep Roy

In-universe information
- Full name: Snit
- Species: Kitonak
- Gender: Male
- Affiliation: Mos Pelgo; Crimson Dawn; Galactic Empire; Mandalorians
- Homeworld: Kirdo III

Droopy McCool is the stage name of a slow-minded Kitonak musician and original member of the Max Rebo Band. He plays a chidinkalu horn, an instrument that resembles a clarinet. Droopy's actual birth name is a series of unpronounceable flute-like whistles, but he was renamed Snit by Orbus, who purchased him as a slave and forced him to join his band due to Snit's musical talents. Following Orbus's death, he is freed and given his familiar stage name by bandmate Sy Snootles. After the band flees Jabba's barge following his death, Droopy quits the group and wanders off alone into the desert to search for other members of his race. He is never seen again, but rumors among Tatooine's moisture farmers claim that the sound of Kitonak pipes have been heard from the far reaches of the desert.

Droopy was played by Deep Roy in a full bodysuit for both versions of Return of the Jedi.

== Special Edition band members ==
The following characters were added to the 1997 Special Edition version of the film.

Ak-rev
- Star Wars character
- First appearance: Return of the Jedi
- Last appearance: Return of the Jedi
- Created by: George Lucas

In-universe information
- Species: Weequay
- Gender: Male
- Affiliation: Max Rebo Band
- Homeworld: Sriluur

Ak-rev is a leathery-faced Weequay skiff guard and drummer from the planet Sriluur. He had played the sacred drums in a monastery devoted to the Weequay god of thunder before moving to Tatooine to serve as one of Jabba's skiff guards, simply in order to mingle with other members of his race. He becomes a part-time drummer for the Max Rebo Band, and after Jabba's death, Ak-rev and fellow percussionist Umpass-stay attempt to flee to Mos Eisley, but the pair is ambushed by Tusken Raiders and Ak-rev is beaten to death.

According to the Star Wars Databank, his musical style is derived from the Japanese art of Taiko. His Special Edition actor was David Gonzalez.

Doda Bodonawieedo
- Star Wars character
- First appearance: Return of the Jedi
- Last appearance: Return of the Jedi
- Created by: George Lucas
- Portrayed by: Nelson Hall

In-universe information
- Species: Rodian
- Gender: Male
- Affiliation: Max Rebo Band
- Homeworld: Tatooine

Doda Bodonawieedo is a green-skinned Rodian musician who plays a slitherhorn, a fictional wind instrument similar to a heckelphone. Orphaned at a young age after his family was killed by bounty hunters, Doda held an affinity for classical Rodian music and crime. His connections with the Tatooine underworld led him to Jabba the Hutt and the Max Rebo Band. Doda remains at Jabba's Palace during the execution at the Sarlacc; when he hears of Jabba's death, he steals several valuable statues from the palace and disappears.

Nelson Hall played Doda in the Special Edition, but was not included in the credits.

Barquin D'an
- Star Wars character
- First appearance: Return of the Jedi
- Last appearance: Return of the Jedi
- Created by: George Lucas
- Portrayed by: Don Bies

In-universe information
- Species: Bith
- Gender: Male
- Affiliation: Max Rebo Band
- Homeworld: Clak'dor VII

Barquin D'an is a Bith musician from the planet Clak'dor VII who plays a Kloo horn, a fictitious wind instrument that resembles a bassoon. He is the estranged older brother of Figrin D'an, and resents the success of his brother's band, The Modal Nodes. He travels to Tatooine to join the Nodes, who are nowhere to be found after his arrival. Barquin stays to perform with local musicians and eventually joins the Max Rebo Band; unaccustomed to the depravity he witnesses in Jabba's Palace, he flees after Oola's gruesome death. After Jabba's demise, he quits music altogether and starts an import/export business.

Barquin was portrayed by Don Bies in an uncredited role.

Greeata Jendowanian
- Star Wars character
- First appearance: Return of the Jedi
- Last appearance: Return of the Jedi
- Created by: George Lucas
- Portrayed by: Celia Fushille

In-universe information
- Species: Rodian
- Gender: Female
- Affiliation: Max Rebo Band

Greeata Jendowanian is a female Rodian dancer and backup vocalist for the Max Rebo Band. She gets her start playing the Kloo horn on a luxury starship called the Kuari Princess, where she befriends Sy Snootles. They become a duo and eventually join up with Max Rebo. After Jabba the Hutt's death and the band's escape into the desert, Greeata and fellow singer Lyn Me come to the band's rescue by driving off a group of Tusken Raiders and stealing their Banthas, which they ride to Mos Eisley.

Greeata was played by Smuin Ballet creative director Celia Fushille in a Rodian bodysuit and mask for the Special Edition.

Lyn Me
- Star Wars character
- First appearance: Return of the Jedi
- Last appearance: Return of the Jedi
- Created by: George Lucas
- Portrayed by: Dalyn Chew

In-universe information
- Species: Twi'lek
- Gender: Female
- Affiliation: Max Rebo Band

Lyn Me is a blue-skinned female Twi'lek dancer and backup vocalist in the Max Rebo Band. She becomes infatuated with Boba Fett and follows him to Tatooine, where she joins the band at Jabba's palace. She meets her hero but is later enraged at his death during the skirmish at the Sarlacc pit. Lyn and Greeata head out into the desert on a stolen landspeeder and rescue Max, Droopy, and Sy from Tusken Raiders before making off with their Banthas. She initially vows to take revenge on Han, Luke and Leia for their part in Fett's death, but then drops her vendetta.

Lyn Me was portrayed by ballet dancer Dalyn Chew.

Rappertunie
- Star Wars character
- First appearance: Return of the Jedi
- Last appearance: Return of the Jedi
- Created by: George Lucas

In-universe information
- Species: Shawda Ubb
- Gender: Male
- Affiliation: Max Rebo Band

Rappertunie is the stage name of Rapotwanalantonee Tivtotolon, a frog-like, potbellied Shawda Ubb musician who plays a harmonica-like instrument called a growdi, which is described in the Star Wars Databank as a cross between a water organ and a flute. He comes from the swamp planet of Manpha, and joins the band on Tatooine, but he confines himself to Jabba's palace due to the unpleasant desert environment, even though his small size places him in constant danger of being eaten. Rappertunie leaves Tatooine to continue his career after Jabba's death, but his knowledge of computer technology leads him to employment as an engineer for a manufacturer of MSE-6 droids.

Rappertunie was an 0.3 meter (0.98 foot)-tall puppet digitally composited into new and existing footage of the film, and was nicknamed "Jedi Rapper" by the filmmakers during production.

Rystáll Sant
- Star Wars character
- First appearance: Return of the Jedi
- Last appearance: The Mandalorian – "Chapter 16: The Rescue" (2020)
- Created by: George Lucas
- Portrayed by: Mercedes Ngoh (Return of the Jedi)

In-universe information
- Species: Human-Theelin hybrid
- Gender: Female
- Affiliation: Max Rebo Band

Rystáll Sant is a colorful female "near-human" singer and dancer from Coruscant. Her mother was human, and her father a Theelin, but Rystáll is orphaned as a small child without ever knowing them and she is taken in by Ortolan musicians. She and her adoptive family are enslaved by a lieutenant in the Black Sun criminal organization, before Lando Calrissian wins them from the criminal in a sabacc game and frees them from slavery. After relocating to Tatooine, she joins the Max Rebo Band as a backup vocalist and dancer. Rystáll is briefly seen flirting with Boba Fett prior to the arrival of Boushh.

Rystáll was portrayed by Canadian dancer Mercedes Ngoh in full-body makeup, which took four hours to apply for her lone day of shooting.

Umpass-stay
- Star Wars character
- First appearance: Return of the Jedi
- Last appearance: Return of the Jedi
- Created by: George Lucas

In-universe information
- Species: Klatooinian
- Gender: Male
- Affiliation: Max Rebo Band

Umpass-stay is a Klatooinian drummer with a canine-like snout and hooded eyes. He works as a spy and a guard for Jabba while performing as a drummer with the Max Rebo Band, and stays behind at Jabba's palace during the failed execution of Luke, Han and Chewbacca. After he is free following Jabba's death, Umpass-stay elects to become a servant for another Hutt household.

Like Ak-rev, Umpass-stay's drumming was inspired by Taiko. His Special Edition actor was uncredited.

Joh Yowza J'ywz'gnk Kchhllbrxcstk Et'nrmdndlcvtbrx
- Star Wars character
- First appearance: Return of the Jedi
- Last appearance: Return of the Jedi
- Created by: Chuck Wendig

In-universe information
- Full name: J'ywz'gnk Kchhllbrxcstk Et'nrmdndlcvtbrx
- Species: Yuzzum
- Gender: Male
- Affiliation: Max Rebo Band
- Homeworld: Endor

Joh Yowza is the stage name of J'ywz'gnk Kchhllbrxcstk Et'nrmdndlcvtbrx, a short, furry Endorian creature known as a Yuzzum, as well as a lead singer in the Max Rebo Band. After he unknowingly stows away on a star freighter while searching for food, the captain keeps him aboard for cooking, cleaning, and other menial tasks. In return, Yowza is well-fed and taught Galactic Basic.

While watching Evar Orbus and His Galactic Jizz-wailers perform at a cafe, he sings along. Impressed with his voice, Orbus signs Yowza, who performs for food and shelter, while Sy gives him his new stage name. After Orbus's death, Yowza joins the band on Tatooine after a successful audition for Jabba. The group disbands after Jabba's death and Yowza travels to Mos Eisley, where he finds a job on a small passenger liner and performs with its house band in exchange for free food and transportation throughout the Outer Rim.

Joh Yowza appeared as a computer-generated image, but his voice actor was uncredited. The Yuzzums were originally slated to appear as a second race on Endor in the original version of the film, but were axed due to high production costs. Only one Yuzzum puppet was constructed, and was included in the background of Jabba's palace.

== Expanded Universe band members ==
Evar Orbus
- Star Wars character
- First appearance: "And the Band Played On"

In-universe information
- Species: Letaki
- Gender: Male
- Affiliation: Evar Orbus and His Galactic Jizz-wailers

Evar Orbus is an eight-tentacled, beak-mouthed Letaki singer and musician who made his first canon appearance in "And the Band Played On." He was the eponymous founder of Evar Orbus and His Galactic Jizz-wailers, in addition to purchasing Kitonak musician Snit (later Droopy McCool) as a slave and adding him to the lineup. The quartet agrees to play a gig at the Mos Eisley cantina, which leads to a conflict with incumbent group The Modal Nodes. After Orbus is killed by Figrin D'an, the band is then renamed after new leader Max Rebo.

Brennan Tik Tali Talosh
- Star Wars character
- First appearance: Star Wars Tales – "Stop That Jawa" (2000)

In-universe information
- Species: Defrian
- Gender: Male
- Occupation: President of the Max Rebo Band Fan Club
- Affiliation: Max Rebo Band Fan Club
- Homeworld: Derf

Brennan Tik Tali Talosh is a Derfian from the planet Derf and president of the Max Rebo Band Fan Club. The character first appeared at the end of Stop that Jawa! from Star Wars Tales 2. He realizes his dream of playing with the group when he is invited to perform with them at Jabba's palace shortly before the Battle of Endor. After they split up, Talosh writes a tell-all book entitled Blue Man's Group (a pun on the performance trio Blue Man Group) without the band's permission, causing them to sever ties with him. He nonetheless treasures his brief stint with the band.
