= Calamari people =

Indigenous ethnic group of the area that is now Cartagena, Colombia

The Calamari people are a pre-Columbian indigenous ethnic group of the area that is now Cartagena, Colombia. It is related to the Puerto Hormiga archaeological site.
