= Kalmar (surname) =

Kalmar or Kalmár is a surname. Notable people with the surname include:

- Bert Kalmar (1884–1947), American songwriter
- Carlos Kalmar (born 1958), Uruguayan conductor
- Ferenc Kalmár (born 1955), Hungarian physicist and politician
- Henrik Kalmár (1870–1931), Hungarian dissident
- Ivan Kalmar (born 1948), Canadian professor
- János Kalmár (born 1942), Hungarian fencer
- Jenő Kalmár (1908–1990), Hungarian footballer and coach
- László Kalmár (1905–1976), Hungarian mathematician
- László Kalmár (1900–1980), Hungarian film director
- Nick Kalmar (born 1987), Australian footballer
- Pál Kalmár (1900–1988), Hungarian pop singer
- Stefan Kalmár, German curator
- Zsolt Kalmár (born 1995), Hungarian footballer
