= List of Star Wars species (K–O) =

This is a list of Star Wars species, containing the names of fictional sentient species from the Star Wars franchise beginning with the letters K to O. Star Wars is an American epic space opera film series created by George Lucas. The first film in the series, Star Wars, was released on May 25, 1977, and became a worldwide pop culture phenomenon, followed by five sequels, three prequels, nine animated television shows, and five live action television series. Many species of alien creatures (often humanoid) are depicted. For the other species listed alphabetically, see the following:

- List of Star Wars species (A–E)
- List of Star Wars species (F–J)
- List of Star Wars species (P–T)
- List of Star Wars species (U–Z)

== Kaleesh ==
The Kaleesh are a nomadic and politically neutral race from the planet Kalee. A bipedal reptilian species, the Kaleesh have reddish-brown scaly skin and cover almost all their bodies to protect them from Kalee's blistering sun. Additionally, they have retractable claws on all four of their fingers, elongated ears, flat noses, and yellow, slitted eyes. The Kaleesh are also renowned for their warrior culture and combat prowess. Most of them wear masks that are carved from the skulls of the planet's most feared creatures such as the karabbac and the mumuu.

General Grievous is an example of a Kaleesh.

== Kaminoan ==
Kaminoans are tall, thin, pale-skinned aliens, with distinctively long necks, which live on the isolated planet of Kamino. Males also have a ridge along the back of their heads. They like to be isolated from the galaxy. Kaminoans were forced to reproduce through cloning, after a natural disaster on Kamino. They work creating and training clones for third parties from stations on large platforms above the sea. Kaminoans seem to be unconcerned about the ethics of their workings. Darth Tyranus erased all traces of the planet Kamino from the Jedi archives.

Kaminoans developed the Grand Army of the Republic, as shown in Star Wars: Episode II – Attack of the Clones. They resemble the stereotypical image of grey aliens in their face and limbs, and engage in similar activities that seem to revolve around genetics and physical experiments with their test subjects.

Kaminoans were able to see colours in the ultraviolet and the infrared spectrum. While to human eyes the halls of the Kaminoan cities were spotless white, to the Kaminoans they were vividly colored.

Taun We and Lama Su are examples of Kaminoans.

== Kilji ==
The Kilji are a species of religious zealots who reside in the galaxy's Unknown Regions; their home is the Kilji homeland, from which the Kiljis' nation, the Kilji Illumine, engages in its conquests of enlightenment. The Kiljis have wrinkly, dark orange skin that stretches in patterns that reflect a Kilji's emotions, and soft, dark brown hair.

== Killik ==
The Killik were an insectoid species who originally inhabited the world of Alderaan prior to human colonization. They maintained a telepathic connection with each other through Force sensitivity, and dwelled in large mound structures and grouped in hives-like communes.

== Karkarodon ==
The Karkarodon are a race of shark-like sentients from the world of Karkaris. They were first introduced in Star Wars: the Clone Wars. The species are known to be fast swimmers, often ripping apart their enemies with their teeth.

== Kel Dor ==
The Kel Dor, sometimes referred to as Kel Dorians, hail from the planet Dorin. They require masks to protect them from oxygen-rich atmospheres and to protect their highly sensitive eyes from light. They are also known for their Force Sages, the Baran Do. One prominent Kel Dor is the Jedi Master and Council member, Plo Koon.

== Keshiri ==
The Keshiri are a near-human species from the Wild Space planet of Kesh. Their characteristics include purple or lavender coloured skin and hair colours which include silver and white shades. About five thousand years before the Battle of Yavin, a Sith starship crash landed on Kesh; the crew, who came to become known as the Lost Tribe of Sith, subsequently subjugated the Keshiri, some of whom eventually joined the Sith. The Keshiri were introduced in the Fate of the Jedi novels.

== Kiffar ==
The Kiffar are a near-human species from the Azurbani system, including Kiffu and Kiffex. The Jedi Master Quinlan Vos was a Kiffar. Their characteristics include dark, tanned skin and long thick dark hair, usually worn in dreadlocks, and some have ceremonial tattoos. One in a hundred Kiffar inherits a psychometric talent to read the history of objects that they touch. The Kiffar are clannish and their strongest members comprise an order known as the Guardians, which are rather powerful.

== Kitonak ==
Droopy McCool, a Kitonak

Kitonaks (also known as Kirdans) are white, pudgy aliens from Kirdo III. They show a tough skin which folds to seal vulnerable openings, a trait evolved to protect them from the harsh environment of Kirdo's deserts. They also have some double organs, including two pairs of lungs.

Droopy McCool of the Max Rebo Band, Anarc, Kruc, and Terno are the only known Kitonaks.

== Klatooinian ==
Klatooinians come from the planet Klatooine. When the Hutts were waging a war against Xim the Despot, they looked for help on some planets. As a result, the Hutts asked the Klatooinians to become part of their army. Since the Klatooinians thought it was some kind of sacred war, their leader Barada M'Beg signed a treaty so that the Klatooinians would be slaves of the Hutts forever. After defeating Xim, Klatooinians remained slaves of the Hutts. Most of their children are named Barada to honour Barada M'Beg.

One of the thugs on Jabba the Hutt's skiff was a Klatooinian named Barada. See also Nikto and Klaatu barada nikto, a famous quote from The Day the Earth Stood Still. One Klatooinian Jedi is Tarados Gon. He can be seen in Attack of the Clones during the Battle of Geonosis.

In The Mandalorian episode 4, "The Sanctuary". Some Klatooinian bandits raid a small village on the planet Sorgan. They somehow acquire an imperial AT-ST walker. Fortunately the Mandalorian and Cara Dune were able to take them out and save the village.

== Kobok ==
Kobok were an insectoid species that live on planet Koboth. They have two orange compound eyes and three-fingers. One famous face was Gaff, a representative in the New Republic.

== Kowakian monkey-lizard ==
The Kowakian monkey-lizards are a vulturous sentient species from the planet Kowak. They are small, with beak-like mouths and large ears. When born monkey-lizards come out in a larval state. On their home planet their laughter is used to scare predators away, because of how loud they laugh. When in captivity, they are not paired with other species because their laughter is too great and too loud. Salacious B. Crumb was one of the most famous Kowakian monkey-lizards, as he is the only one seen in any of the Star Wars movies.

An unnamed, fuchsia-skinned Kowakian monkey-lizard appears in 2 episodes of Star Wars: The Clone Wars, "Dooku Captured" and "The Gungan General", as the pet of Hondo Ohnaka, leader of a band of Weequay pirates.

Another Kowakian monkey-lizard is seen roasting on a spit at a market in the first episode of The Mandalorian as a second monkey lizard watches from a nearby cage.

== Kubaz ==
The Kubaz are an insect-eating species with long snouts, that have been known to be informants for the Empire. One such Kubaz, by the name of Garindan, led Imperial stormtroopers to the droids on Tatooine in A New Hope. Because of their diet, the insectoid Verpine have a marked distrust of the Kubaz who have often taken great steps to procure Verpine specimens for their suppers.

== Kurtzen ==
The Kurtzen are a pale, hairless, humanoid race from Bakura. Being the only native sentient species on Bakura, and few in number, they were quickly outnumbered by human colonists.

== Kushiban ==
Jedi Master Ikrit is Kushiban

Kushiban are small rabbit-like creatures that live on Kushibah in the Star Wars galaxy. Distinguishing features include large black eyes, floppy ears, and a long tail. They are capable of walking on either their hind legs or on all fours, though to move more quickly in a run or a charge, they must run with all four appendages. On their hind legs they stand at 0.5 meters or 1.6404 feet tall, with an extra 0.3 meters' worth of tail. While often mistaken for cute, pet-like animals, they are actually intelligent beings with a complex culture as well as both a written and spoken language. They have mastered fire (used to frighten away hostile, fire-fearing Xinkras) and can use technology. Rather than paws, they have hands with opposable thumbs and feet. As a means of communication, Kushibans' fur changes color in correlation to its mood. A Kushiban in a calm, normal state of emotions is white; a Kushiban in the deepest of despair is totally black.

While they tend to stay on Kushibah, the occasional Kushiban is called away by wanderlust or a specific need. Jedi Master Ikrit is the most famous of the Kushiban who have done so.

== Kwa ==
The Kwa were an ancient, blue-skinned race that lived on the planet Dathomir. They created the Star Temples and the Infinity Gate on Dathomir around 100,000 BBY. Over time the Kwa sealed their temples and left large wuffa worms to guard them. Nobody really knows what happened to the Kwa, but the ones that were on Dathomir devolved into the primitive Kwi.

== Kwi ==
A primitive, blue-skinned, saurians species native to Dathomir, the Kwi degenerated from the Kwa, the masterminds behind the Star Temples and Infinity Gate on Dathomir. In 31 BBY, many Kwi were slaughtered by the Nightsisters of Dathomir in an attempt, by the Nightsisters, to unlock the power of the Infinity Gate. By the time Luke Skywalker and Prince Isolder landed on Dathomir in 8 ABY, the Kwi had split up into different tribes, two of which were the Blue Mountain People and the Blue Desert People.

== Kyuzo ==
The Kyuzo are a race of humanoid creatures. They have green skin and have masks to filter out moisture. A famous Kyuzo is the bounty hunter Embo.

== Lannik ==
The Lannik are a race of tan skinned humanoids from a planet of the same name. They have long ears, similar to Yoda's species. The most prominent one is Even Piell, a member of the Jedi Council.

== Lasat ==
The Lasat are a crafty and sneaky sentient species from Lasan. They are stronger, swifter and stealthier than humans. Their planet was taken over by the Empire who committed a mass genocide on its people. The Lasat's origin is from the planet Lira San (the Lasats' true homeworld), and sometime in between they settled the planet Lasan. At some point the Empire orchestrated a genocide of the Lasat people using ion disruptor rifles, nearly exterminating the species. The Lasani honor guard carry bo rifles, a unique weapon which is a cross between an electro staff and a blaster rifle. Imperial special agent Alexsandr Kallus was the only human to wield a bo rifle, a source of conflict between him and the rebel Zeb Orrelios.

Jaro Tapal was a Lasat Jedi Master who appeared in the 2019 video game Star Wars Jedi: Fallen Order.

Garazeb "Zeb" Orrelios from Star Wars: Rebels is a Lasat.

== Lepi ==
The Lepi are a rabbit-like species that stand on two legs.

This was the Basic name used to describe the Lepus carnivorus, a species of tall, furred lagomorphs which was native to the planet Coachelle Prime. The Lepi were a carnivorous race, distinguished by their large incisors and the various colours of their fur, which ranged from green to dark blue. Despite their appearance, the Lepi were a technologically advanced race, having achieved spaceflight and colonized the five planets in the system and the neighbouring asteroid belt. Lepi were considered sexually mature at just ten years of age, and females often gave birth to litters of three dozen or more offspring, resulting in a swift growth in their population. This growth spurred on the development of their space-travel technology, as colony worlds were seen as a response to overpopulation of Coachelle Prime. Individual Lepi were known for their increased metabolism, a trait that often manifested itself as hyper-activity

The only known reference to the Lepi in Star Wars media is the character Jaxxon, who appeared in the original Marvel Star Wars comics in the late 1970s. He referred to himself as a "meat-eatin', rocket-ridin' rabbit", and his ship the Rabbit's Foot bore a vague resemblance to the Millennium Falcon.

There was also the native language of the Lepus carnivorus race, which was also referred to as Lepp or Lepese.

== Letaki ==
The Letaki are a race from the planet Letaki in the Star Wars universe. Letaki have eight tentacles and egg-shaped heads. Evar Orbus is an example of a male Letaki.

== Lurmen ==
The Lurmen (also known as Mygeetans) are a diminutive, pacifistic lemuroid mammalian species native to the crystalline world of Mygeeto and also had a settlement on Maridun. Their bodies were covered entirely in fur, which ranged in color from a dark brown to a white-gray, though they did wear garments. The Lurmen had heads protruding perpendicular from their chest two large golden orange eyes, a nose and a mouth. Each Lurmen had a tail, and they communicated through speech; Lurmen were able to speak Basic. Some Lurmen had the ability to curl up into a ball and roll along the ground, such as Wag Too. Lurmen were able to cover large amounts of ground at great speed.

Most Lurmen were pacifistic by nature and refused to fight or run even in the face of death. They often would hide instead of using violence. As pacifists, they carried no weapons but carried farming tools or ropes. When some Lurmen fought the Separatists, alongside Ahsoka Tano and Anakin Skywalker, they refrained from ever destroying or killing the enemy, choosing instead to restrain the droids for the Jedi to finish off. Their farming tools were used mostly as a leverage tool in these tactics and to provide something to tie the rope to, though sometimes they were used as a weapon for striking an enemy.

== Massassi ==
The Massassi were an ancient primitive warrior race that were enslaved by the Sith. The Massassi were brought to Yavin 4 by the Sith Lord Naga Sadow who was on the run from the Republic and the Jedi. They were originally a red-skinned humanoid race until Naga Sadow conducted cruel genetic experiments on them turning them into a race of fearsome, savage, hunchbacked predators. Despite this cruelty, the Massassi treated Naga Sadow as a god by building huge temples and palaces to honor their Sith Lord. They became extinct when Exar Kun sapped the life out of every Massassi on Yavin 4 so that he could free his soul from his body in order to escape the pursuing Jedi. Only one Massassi, named Kalgrath, survived.

During the Galactic Civil War, the Rebel Alliance built a base in the old Massassi temples on Yavin 4. It was from this hidden base that Rebel starships were able to score their first victory against the Empire, and from which squadrons of X-wings and Y-wings attacked and destroyed the first Death Star.

In 22 ABY (After the Battle of Yavin), during the time covered by the Junior Jedi Knights series, Anakin Solo and Tahiri Veila were led by the Force to find a large golden globe deep inside a Massassi temple on Yavin 4. Inside the globe were the imprisoned souls of Massassi children whom the young Jedi candidates eventually freed with guidance from Jedi Master Ikrit.

== Melodie ==
The Melodies are an amphibious, mermaid-like humanoid species that live in Yavin 8's purple mountains, lakes and rivers. They appeared in the second book of the Junior Jedi Knights series. Melodies are hatched from eggs, then live on land for a short time during their youth, and at a certain age, Melodies undergo a ritual called a Changing Ceremony, in which they change forms that will no longer enable them to live on land.

When Exar Kun imprisoned the Massassi children on Yavin 4 during his reign in 3,997 BBY (Before the Battle of Yavin), the parents of the Massassi children went to Yavin 8 and met the Melodie children, whom they asked for help. The children took them to the Elders, but because of the Elders' forms, they could not leave the waters. The Massassi carved messages into the walls of a cave, hoping that someone would eventually arrive who could read their language and come to their aid. A millennium later, Sannah, a Force-sensitive Melodie, helped Anakin Solo and Tahiri Veila (who had come to Yavin 8 with Lyric, a student from the Academy who was about to undergo the Changing Ceremony) to decipher the carvings. The information helped them to ultimately free the imprisoned Massassi children later in the Junior Jedi Knights series.

== Mimbanite ==
An alien species from Circarpous V, the Mimbanites were related to the Coway. When the Empire took control of their planet, they thought this species was not suited for the physical demands of slavery.

== Miraluka ==
An alien race almost exactly the same in appearance as humans, Miraluka differ in that they have no eyes or blank white sockets and cannot see through the focusing of light. Miraluka typically hide their lack of eyes by wearing a headband, a mask, or similar concealing headwear, because they are much less common than humans, and it is easier to travel if they are seen as being of the dominant species; thus the common confusion as to who is or isn't a Miraluka. Miralukas see through the Force, as they are a Force-sensitive race; they are often quite shocked if shown life not connected to the Force, like the Jedi Exile.

Miralukas' adopted homeworld is Alpheridies. They migrated there after their original homeworld became unstable and began losing its atmosphere to space. Alpheridies' sun emits light in the infra-red spectrum, and this led to the Miraluka losing their ability to see visible light over thousands of generations. Instead, they came to rely on a latent ability to perceive the world through the Force.

A colony world of the Miraluka named Katarr was stripped of all life by a Sith Lord named Darth Nihilus approximately 3,955 years BBY, during a meeting of several Jedi Masters. The meeting was convened to discuss the silent war being waged across the galaxy by Sith Lords Darth Nihilus and Darth Sion. The only survivor of this colony world was Visas Marr, who later became the servant of Darth Nihilus and then followed the Jedi Exile and helped destroy Darth Nihilus and his ship.

Notable Miraluka include former Sith Visas Marr, and the Dark Jedi Jerec.

== Mirialan ==
The Mirialan race is a species native to the planet Mirial. They have purer eye colours than humans, some have either paler or darker skin colours, and tattoos covering some part of their face that represent individual achievement in some field. They have extrasensory organs on their heads, sensitive to dryness. Jedi Master Luminara Unduli and her Padawan learner, Barriss Offee are both Mirialans, as is the Seventh Sister seen in Star Wars Rebels; one male Mirialan Jedi master named Ardray was featured in the MMORPG game Star Wars: The Old Republic.

== Mon Calamari ==
The Mon Calamari are an amphibious humanoid race from the planet Mon Calamari. They typically have salmon-coloured skin but can also have shades of blue, green, or purple. They have a high-domed head, large eyes, and webbed hands. Their eyes are positioned toward the sides of their heads, forcing them to turn to see nearby objects. They can breathe underwater up to 30 meters deep and coexist with the Quarren on their home planet. Their name is a reference to the close resemblance of their heads to calamari (squid). They wear modern Republic-style clothing, while the Quarren prefer traditional robes.

During the Clone Wars, the Mon Calamari remained with the Galactic Republic, while the Quarren joined the Confederacy of Independent Systems (CIS). The CIS supported the Quarren with a massive underwater droid army to overthrow the Mon Calamari. With the help of Jedi Kit Fisto, the Mon Calamari demonstrated their traditional underwater fighting techniques. They rode aquatic mounts while wielding shields and lances armed with blasters.

During the Galactic Civil War, the Mon Calamari joined the Rebel Alliance after the Empire destroyed three of their floating cities with a Star Destroyer. Their expertise in starship construction and the supply of Mon Calamari Cruisers proved vital to the Alliance, as these ships could challenge the Galactic Empire's fleet. Prior to joining the Alliance, the Mon Calamari had only built passenger liners due to their peaceful nature. The Mon Calamari are also renowned for their water dancers who perform in prestigious venues. Admiral Ackbar, a Mon Calamari, served as the supreme admiral of the Rebel Alliance's naval forces. Quarrie, another Rebellion-sympathetic Mon Calamari, was a spacecraft engineer named for Star Wars visual artist Ralph McQuarrie and was the designer of the B-wing starfighter prototype named the Blade Wing, as seen in the Star Wars Rebels second-season episode "Wings of the Master".

An example of a Mon Calamari Jedi is Nahdar Vebb.

Mon Calamari are a playable species in Star Wars: Galaxies.

In the Star Wars: Legacy comic, Darth Krayt launched an attack on the Mon Calamari and wiped almost all of them out through gassing, making the Mon Calamari an endangered people in this continuity.

== Mustafarian ==
Mustafarians are the native inhabitants of Mustafar. They have leathery skin with a cloak and a trunk. Not much else is known about this species as they live in seclusion. They are believed to be sentient and are able to withstand extreme temperatures. They have saddles for lava fleas and carry defensive laser rifles. As a manhood ritual they leap across "water-falls" of magma wearing no protection. When the Techno Union established mining facilities on the planet, many of the Mustafarians took up jobs as workers at one of the many mining facilities.

== Muun ==
A thin, tall species from Muunilinst, Muuns (/mjuːnz/, MYOONZ) have pasty-white skin. Their bodies are elongated and thin, with equally elongated and thin heads. Muuns do not like travelling, and they usually stay indoors. They are also known for their longevity. Muuns controlled the InterGalactic Banking Clan. During the Clone Wars, Muuns helped the Separatists and minted new coins for planets leaving the Republic.

Notable Muun were Darth Sidious's master, Darth Plagueis the Wise, and the ruling members of the InterGalactic Banking Clan including San Hill. Darth Plagueis had the ability to use the dark side of the force to influence midi-chlorians to create life and to prevent people from dying, the only Force user to have such a power. (Note: In Rae Carson's novelization of the 2019 film The Rise of Skywalker, it is revealed that Emperor Palpatine had also discovered Plagueis' "secret to immortality", using this knowledge to resurrect himself.)

== Myneyrsh ==
A four-armed, crystal-skinned alien species indigenous to the planet Wayland.

== Myriad ==
The Myriad are an ancient race of highly intelligent cybernetic beings. Their true form is not known because the cybernetic implants vary. Their home world is the planet Trieron They have no affiliation with any one group, but serve all races.

== Nagai ==
The Nagai are aliens with pale skin, jet-black hair and angular features, they lived on the planet Nagi, beyond the borders of the Old Republic and the Empire. They were originally known as "Knives". They were natural enemies of the Tof, usually waging wars against them. They are habitually forgetful, particularly regarding things that pertain to annual events.

Darth Nihl is a Nagai.

== Nautolan ==
Nautolans are amphibious humanoids with a range of skin colours from greens to blues and greys, a cartilage-reinforced skeleton, and shark-like eyes. Instead of hair, a Nautolan sports a crown of long tendrils.

Their homeworld is Glee Anselm, a planet of vast swamps, lakes, and seas located in the Mid Rim. However Nautolans are relatively common at any space port.

Nautolans reflect the moods of those around them. When confronted by anger and violence, they respond in kind. When approached in a calm, civilized manner, they seem helpful and polite.

Jedi Master Kit Fisto was a Nautolan.

== Neimoidian ==
Neimoidians are the most visible villains of the film The Phantom Menace. According to the Star Wars expanded universe, Neimoidians are descendants of Duro colonists that landed on Neimoidia in the year of the Republic inception. At some point in their development, the Neimoidians learned to domesticate giant beetles, and they have been getting others to do physical labor for them ever since as stated in Labyrinth of Evil. By the time of The Phantom Menace, the Neimoidians control the galaxy's largest commercial corporation and are at the head of the powerful Trade Federation.

Following the battle of their homeworld, many of their grub hatcheries were destroyed by Clone Troopers late into the Clone Wars, in which they were quickly adaptable to the impact of their culture. So they then associated themselves with their Duro cousins, first by destroying the remaining communal hives and burning down all the fungus farms in order to distance themselves from millennia of internal oppression.

Neimoidian culture is extremely hierarchical. Although the monarch of the Neimoidians is never seen in the films, every Neimoidian ship carries a hologram of her. Amongst the seen Neimoidians, clothing denotes status:

- Lott Dod wears a tall diplomatic ploov and a purple representative's mantle over a very expensive robe of Tyrian violet cloth.
- Nute Gunray, Commanding Viceroy of the Federation army, wears a showy crested tiara and blue viceroy's collar.
- Rune Haako, legal counsel to Nute, wears an attorney's cowl.
- Daultay Dofine, captain of the flagship vessel for the Naboo invasion, wears a tall command officer's mitre.
- An unnamed Neimoidian wears a lavender collar identifying him as a financial officer.
- The most exalted Neimoidians rank a walking mechno-chair. Neither comfortable nor practical, techno-chairs are very expensive beetle-like seats that can carry lazy Neimoidians or project hologram transmissions. Neimoidians also employ a number of prestigious protocol droids, including the brilliantly silver TC-14. TC-14 is kept docile through frequent memory wipes and is employed to distract guests while the Neimoidians devise manipulation strategies.

In contrast to the rare and showy technology of the Neimoidian elite, the battle forces of the Neimoidians are mechanically advanced, but cheaply mass-produced. An emphasis is placed on massive, intimidating numbers of mindless battle droids controlled through a central computer. This unquestioning reliance on a central control is what will ultimately spell failure for the mechanized army. Episode II revealed that their form closely resembles that of the vaguely insect-like natives of Geonosis, where the droids are mass-produced.

Much like many of the Imperial Officers in the Original Star Wars Trilogy were given British accents, some Neimoidians have been given Thai accents.

== Nelvaanian ==
Canine-muzzled humanoids introduced in Season 3 of the animated series Star Wars: Clone Wars. They live on the planet Nelvaan on the Outer Rim. All of their warrior braves were captured by Techno-Union scientists and were physically and mentally mutated into large bear-like creatures with their left arms replaced with laser cannons, to try to create perfect cyborg soldiers for the CIS. During the Liberation of Nelvaan, Anakin Skywalker, who was referred to by the race as "Holt Kezed" ("Ghost Hand" in their language), would free them as he destroyed the Separatist base. Following this, Anakin killed all Techno-Union scientists there and managed to bring the mutated Nelvaanians back to their tribe.

== Neti ==
The Neti were a race of sentient shape-shifting tree-like beings from Rykk. Jedi Master Ood Bnar was a Neti.

== Nikto ==
The Nikto people are a humanoid species from the planet Kintan who have scaly skin, black eyes, and symmetrical horns and spikes on their faces. Subspecies include Green Nikto (Kadas'sa'Nikto) and Red Nikto (Kajain'sa'Nikto). Niktos are first introduced in Return of the Jedi (1983) in the form of Klaatu, a Green Nikto who serves Jabba the Hutt. Red Nikto appear in The Phantom Menace (1999), Attack of the Clones (2002), and Revenge of the Sith (2005). Ima-Gun Di is a Red Nikto Jedi Master in Star Wars: The Clone Wars. Nikto of both subspecies were protecting The Child in the episode "Chapter 1: The Mandalorian" of The Mandalorian.

In the 2016 novel Star Wars: Bloodline, the Red Nikto crime lord Rinnrivin Di heads a dangerous cartel based on the planet Bastatha.

The bombardment of Kintan by stellar radiation from the explosion of a nearby star had sparked rapid evolution in its native species. For several centuries, the Niktos were ruled over by a violent and fanatical religious organization called the Cult of M'dweshuu, which was much despised by the majority of Kintan's population. When the Hutts were waging a war against Xim the Despot, they saw the Niktos' situation as an opportunity to recruit another servant species into their army. A fleet of Huttese starships bombarded the Cult of M'dweshuu's stronghold from orbit, wiping it out, and the grateful Niktos eagerly signed the Treaty of Vontor, placing themselves in servitude to the Hutts indefinitely.

== Noghri ==
The Noghri are a humanoid species with steely gray skin. Their level of technology was still relatively primitive by Galactic Standards by the time of the rise of the Empire. They produce extremely skilled assassins known for their innate abilities at stealth and hand-to-hand combat. Like the Wookiees, they respect honor above all else.

The Noghri are natives of the planet Honoghr, which was ravaged by toxins from a Trade Federation core ship destroyed in battle during the Clone Wars. Darth Vader came to the planet some time later, tricking the Noghri into worshipping him and becoming slaves to himself and Emperor Palpatine.

With the Noghri still enslaved to the Galactic Empire five years after the death of Palpatine, Grand Admiral Thrawn orders them to kidnap the pregnant Leia Organa Solo. Realizing that neither she nor her children would be truly safe as long as the Noghri serve the Empire, she goes to Honoghr in order to convince the Noghri to leave the Empire's service. Through their acute sense of smell, the Noghri easily recognize Leia as the daughter of the revered Vader, who they were tricked into worshipping, and she is able to use this fact to convince the Noghri that the Empire has been lying to them and has kept them in slavery for many years. As a result, the Noghri turn against the Empire, and become Leia's servants instead. Thrawn dies when his Noghri bodyguard Rukh turns on him and stabs him.

Following the death of Thrawn, the Noghri allied with the New Republic who helped resettle the Noghri to other planets (including Wayland), giving Honoghr time to heal. Leia and her entire family become highly respected figures in Noghri society. As a result, the Noghri to saved them from a Yuuzhan Vong strike force. Much like Chewbacca did with Han Solo, the Noghri always made sure Leia has bodyguards.

The Noghri appear extensively in the Thrawn trilogy of novels, written by Timothy Zahn, and are also playable in the Forces of Corruption Expansion for Star Wars Empire at War, armed with disrupter rifles.

== Nosaurian ==
Nosaurians are reptilian creatures that have spikes on their head and beaklike mouths. Nosaurians are expert podracers and famous ones include Jet Venim, Mileggi's podracer, and an unnamed one in the Boonta Eve Classic.

== Ogemite ==
The Ogemite are a near-Human avian race native to the planet Ogem. They have yellow skin and short, blond, feather-like hair, similar to the Omwati.

== Omwati ==
Although the Omwati are not a branch of humanity, the differences are extremely small. The Omwati skin is a bluish color and their eyes are generally blue or black. The size of an adult Omwati borders that of a human, although their morphology is typically slightly frailer with regard to females. There are very few Omwati with a stout physiology. Their most striking characteristic is their "hair" which appears to be made of small, diaphanous feathers of an iridescent color. Omwati do not have any other hair.

The Omwati rarely left their homeworld and rarely took part in galactic events, until Wilhuff Tarkin enslaved the youngest of their species to serve as Imperial scientists. Qwi Xux is perhaps the best-known member of the Omwati species. She was a researcher at the Imperial Maw Installation and a principal designer of the Death Star. The Rogue Jedi Kyp Durron ripped her memories of both this technology and her past from her mind.

== Ongree ==
The Ongree are a bizarre looking species from the Skustell Cluster. The Jedi Pablo-Jill was an Ongree.

== Ortolan ==
Ortolans

The Ortolans are a race of fat, blue-skinned creatures with long snouts, not all that different from a small elephant. One example is Max Rebo, the leader of The Max Rebo Band, contracted to play in Jabba the Hutt's Tatooine palace. Possessing a love of food and music, these small aliens are also adept at surviving the frigid temperatures of their homeworld Orto.

Although Neel, from Star Wars: Skeleton Crew, and his family and others on the hidden planet At Attin are physically similar to Max Rebo, they are not Ortolan, they are Myykians.

== Oswaft ==
Large manta-ray like creatures that were encountered by Lando Calrissian during his early adventures in the Outer Rim. They live in a nebula called ThonBoka where they are nourished by nutrients from their sun. They live in the vacuum of space and have the unusual ability to travel through hyperspace for short distances. If an Oswaft is deprived of nutrients from a star for too long it will turn opaque and die. They can also subsist on the waste products of spaceships such as the Millennium Falcon and produce waste in the form of valuable minerals.

== See also ==
- List of Star Wars species (A–E)
- List of Star Wars species (F–J)
- List of Star Wars species (P–T)
- List of Star Wars species (U–Z)
