= Hutt (Star Wars) =

Species in the Star Wars universe

- Jabba the Hutt in Star Wars: Episode I –The Phantom Menace (1999)

In-universe information
- Home world: Nal Hutta; Varl (originally)
- Distinctions: Slug-like physiology, three lungs
- Language: Huttese

The Hutts are an alien species in the Star Wars franchise. They are rotund, voracious and grotesque-looking slug-like creatures with a predisposition to being leaders in organized crime. The most famous Hutt and the first to be depicted was Jabba the Hutt in the films Return of the Jedi, the Special Edition release of A New Hope (in a formerly-deleted scene modified and re-inserted into the film), and The Phantom Menace. Jabba and numerous other Hutts appear in various works of the Star Wars expanded universe, which greatly elaborates on their history, culture and role in galactic society.

== Portrayal in the Star Wars universe ==
=== Appearances ===
A Hutt first appeared in the film Return of the Jedi (1983), and was designed by Phil Tippett. Jabba the Hutt is a crime lord that keeps an imprisoned Han Solo as a trophy. Only mentioned in the original releases of the first two Star Wars films, he reappeared in a deleted scene that was completed for the Special Edition of A New Hope in 1997. In The Phantom Menace (1999), Jabba appears alongside Gardulla the Hutt, the prior owner of main character Anakin Skywalker and his mother, Shmi. She is explained as having lost them while betting on a podrace with junk dealer Watto, and reappeared in The Clone Wars episode "Hunt for Ziro". Jabba's infant son Rotta is featured in The Clone Wars film; other Hutts feature in the series. The Twins referred to a Hutt brother and sister who were crime lords during the New Republic Era. They were cousins of Tatooine crime lord Jabba.

=== Ecology ===
Adult Hutts are similar to shell-less gastropods in appearance and movement. In the novelization of Return of the Jedi, it is mentioned that Hutts were born bipedal, but their "rump legs" fused together over time due to lack of movement. Hutts are extremely long-lived and reproduce asexually, nursing their young in pouches like those of marsupials. Hutts have separate sexes in canon, no longer being hermaphroditic as they were in the Legends continuity. According to Legends, all members of the species are hermaphroditic.

=== Economy ===
==== Hutt Space ====
Hutt Space was a "special autonomous region" of the Star Wars galaxy on the border between the Mid Rim and the Outer Rim Territories, and located to the galactic east of the Core Worlds. It encompassed the Si'Klaata Cluster, bordered on the Tion Hegemony, and consisted of 1,000 inhabited worlds. Hutt Space was named for the Hutt species, who dominated the region.

Hutt Space remaines free of Imperial rule owing to its trade of wealth, influence and cooperation with the authorities on Imperial Coruscant. Noted as being a haven of corruption, piracy, and home to the disreputable elements of the galaxy, the Galactic Empire considered Hutt Space an "open festering wound" carved across Imperial space.

==== Hutt Cartel ====
The Hutt Cartel was a loose confederation of criminal families, mercenary elements, and front organizations. The Hutt Cartel were financially invested in every illicit enterprise in the Outer Rim; engaged in spice smuggling, slavery, gambling, extortion, and bounty hunting. The nature of this consortium prohibited any strong central authority.

=== Culture ===
==== Nal Hutta ====
Hutts live on the planet Nal Hutta—"Glorious Jewel" in Huttese. Nal Hutta is the capital of Hutt Space, the species' empire. The primary moon of Nal Hutta is Nar Shaddaa. Before the establishment of the Old Republic, the Hutts were the dominant species in the galaxy, although they never built up an extensive empire; their dominance focused instead on trade and economic empires.

==== Grand Hutt Council ====
The Grand Hutt Council is the de facto ruling body of the Hutt species, and by extension, the highest authority in all of Hutt-controlled space. The council was composed of the most influential and high-profile Hutt leaders, its members were responsible for the day-to-day affairs of Hutt Space. When dealing with a foreign power, they elect one of their own to act as 'Head of State'. Despite pretense of legitimacy, its kleptocratic "government" reflected the corrupt nature of its enterprises, being prone to instability as Hutt families engage in endless shadow wars against their rivals.

=== Huttese language ===
The Hutts' native language, Huttese, is a lingua franca of galactic organized crime.

The language is a constructed language, with many distorted English words, most having the same syllables as English. Its phonology is said to be based on the Quechua language. Non-Hutts also speak Huttese, including the Max Rebo Band, Bib Fortuna, and C-3PO.

== Reception ==
=== Parodies ===
Due to Jabba's iconically hideous appearance, the image of the Hutt species has been a subject of numerous parodies in popular culture, often invoking the creatures as symbols of obesity, gluttony, greed and corruption. Of particular note is "Pizza the Hutt" from the Star Wars spoof film Spaceballs, Peter Griffin's portrayal in the Family Guy episode "He's Too Sexy For His Fat," and Sally Struthers' portrayal in the South Park episode "Starvin Marvin in Space."
