= Changes in Star Wars re-releases =

The original theatrical version of Return of the Jedi features Sebastian Shaw as the Force spirit of Anakin Skywalker (above left). The 2004 DVD version replaces Shaw with Hayden Christensen (below left), who plays Anakin in the prequels.

Many of the films in the Star Wars franchise have been re-released, both theatrically and on home media formats. Franchise creator George Lucas often altered the films for the re-releases. These alterations range from minor refinements (such as color grading and audio mixing) to major changes (such as the insertion of new dialogue, scenes, and visual effects). The original trilogy was altered the most, although revisions were also made to the prequel films. According to Lucas, some changes brought the films closer to his original vision, while others were attempts to create continuity with other films.

Different versions of the Star Wars films have existed since the 1977 release of the original Star Wars film, which was retroactively subtitled Episode IV – A New Hope. However, the first major changes were made in 1997, when remastered Special Edition versions of the original trilogy films were released to commemorate the franchise's 20th anniversary. A major motivation for these changes was to test visual effects for the forthcoming prequel films, especially computer-generated imagery (CGI). Additional notable changes were made when the original trilogy was released on DVD in 2004, in an attempt to create more consistency with the prequel trilogy. More changes were made to the films for their Blu-ray release in 2011 and for their 4K Ultra HD release in 2019.

Although some fans and critics felt that many of the smaller changes were innocuous or justified, most larger changes were received negatively—particularly those made to the original three films, the theatrical versions of which have never been officially released on home video in high definition. Although the master negatives of the original trilogy were dismantled, another set of high-quality duplicates was created for long-term preservation.

== Background ==
Prior to making Star Wars, George Lucas experienced dissatisfaction with the changes made to his previous films by the studios that produced them. His first feature, THX 1138 (1971), had five minutes removed by Warner Bros. His next film, American Graffiti (1973), had several minutes removed by Universal Pictures. Following the success of Star Wars, Lucas's original version of THX 1138 was theatrically released in 1977 and his original version of American Graffiti was theatrically released in 1978. (Note: American Graffiti was further altered for the 1998 DVD release with a CGI modification to the opening shot and in 2004, Lucas supervised a director's cut of THX 1138 including new special effects.)

As an advocate for the moral rights of artists, Lucas spoke before the U.S. House of Representatives in 1988 in support of legislation that would discourage studios from altering films without the consent of their creators. Lucas stated:

People who alter or destroy works of art, and our cultural heritage, for profit or as an exercise of power are barbarians ... Today, engineers with their computers can ... add or subtract material to the philosophical taste of the copyright holder. Tomorrow, more advanced technology will be able to replace actors with "fresher faces," or alter dialogue ... Attention should be paid to the interest of those who are yet unborn, who should be able to see ... the past generation as it saw itself, and how it worked with the mediums that were available to it.

In 1989, the original release of Star Wars was selected for preservation in the National Film Registry (NFR). In 2014, it still did not have a "working copy" (a copy available for public viewing) of the 1977 film; Lucas refused to submit the original, stating that he no longer authorized the release of the theatrical version. Lucasfilm offered the 1997 "Special Edition" release, but the NFR refused it as the first published version must be accepted. The U.S. Library of Congress (LC) subsequently used a 35-mm print of the film submitted in 1978 as part of the film's copyright deposit to make a digital copy, which in 2015 was made available to watch in person at the LC. In June 2025, the British Film Institute screened the original film in its unaltered form at a film festival. In December 2025, Lucasfilm announced that a restoration of the unaltered original film would return to theaters on February 19, 2027, in celebration of its 50th anniversary. (Note: Writing for Gizmodo, James Whitbrook notes that it is unclear which version represents the "original" release.)

== Release history ==
- 1977: On May 25, Star Wars had a limited theatrical release. After its success, a wider release of the film included a few special-effects changes and reformatted credits. Three different audio versions (a Dolby Stereo mix, a six-channel mix for 70 mm screenings, and a mono mix print) were created, with significant differences. Notably, the mono mix print featured several alternate and additional sound effects and lines of dialogue. Later in the year, among others, a silent, English-subtitled Super 8 reel version of the film was released by Ken Films.
- 1980: In May, The Empire Strikes Back was theatrically released. After its initial opening, but before its wide release, Lucas extended the end sequence. A 70 mm print of the film differed from the more widely distributed 35-mm print in takes of dialogue, visual and sound effects, shot choices, and transitions between shots; none of these changes appeared in later releases, with exception of one dialogue change.
- 1981: In April, Star Wars was re-released, with the addition of the subtitles "Episode IV" and "A New Hope" added to the opening crawl and the opening chase slightly redone.
- 1983: In May, Return of the Jedi was theatrically released.
- 1985: The original Star Wars film was re-released on VHS, LaserDisc, and Capacitance Electronic Disc (CED) with an improved audio mix (featuring a fusion of Lucas's preferred audio takes from the three 1977 mixes). The LaserDisc and CED sped the film up by 3% to fit onto a single disc. (Note: Some releases additionally had minor aspect ratio changes.)
- 1993: The original trilogy was released on LaserDisc as "The Definitive Collection". With the exception of a new THX audio mix, scratch and dirt removal, and color balance changes, it matched the original theatrical releases.
- 1995: The original trilogy was re-released on VHS with THX audio, advertised as the final release of the theatrical versions.
- 1997: The Special Edition of the original trilogy was released theatrically from January through March for the 20th anniversary of Star Wars. This release featured the first significant changes, which were intended to prove that Industrial Light & Magic (ILM) could effectively produce CGI visual effects for the prequel trilogy. For the Special Edition of A New Hope, the additional sound effects and lines of dialogue from the original mono mix print were carried over. (Note: Lucas has stated that "There are two or three shots that are really bad and I know that [1977's Star Wars] is going to be judged on that. I was embarrassed. In 1993, the 20th anniversary was coming up and that was the impetus for doing a Special Edition of A New Hope – to bring it up to the standard we were aiming for." Lucas has also stated, "Once I had started redoing the first film, it was such a good experience, I said "we should go back and finish the other two as well".) (Note: Some state that the changes were intended to modernize the films and create consistency with the prequel trilogy.)
- 1999: In May, Episode I – The Phantom Menace was theatrically released.
- 2001: In November, The Phantom Menace was released on DVD, which features a slightly extended cut from the theatrical release.
- 2002: In May, Episode II – Attack of the Clones was theatrically released. A version made for digital-projection theaters included a few special effects which were not ready for the initial wide release; (Note: These include the addition of sparks to Jango Fett's jetpack just before he is beheaded by Mace Windu and Anakin Skywalker using his mechanical hand to take Padmé's hand during the wedding scene.) the DVD features the digital version with some extended lines of dialogue. A version was also made for IMAX theaters using IMAX's then-new digital-mastering process, with the aspect ratio cropped to 1.81:1 and the duration reduced to 120 minutes due to IMAX film platter limitations at the time.
- 2004: In September, the original trilogy was released on DVD. Further significant alterations were made, including a rework of Darth Vader's voice in A New Hope and replacing Latin script text with the fictional writing system Aurebesh.
- 2005: In May, Episode III – Revenge of the Sith was theatrically released. The DVD release features a minor editing change. (Note: This was reversed for the 2011 Blu-ray.)
- 2006: In September, Limited Edition DVDs of the 2004 versions of the original trilogy were re-issued; these contain the original unaltered versions on bonus discs. These match the 1993 LaserDisc release, sans the subtitle Episode IV – A New Hope. (Note: According to Empire, "the quality of the transfer is laughably bad, with a non-anamorphic letterboxed 4:3 aspect ratio creating huge black bars on all sides of the film, if watched on a widescreen TV." A review from IGN was more mixed, praising the DVDs themselves and the inclusion of both the original and enhanced versions, while the main area of criticism was on Lucas' decision to delay specifically the theatrical versions' home media release, calling it a "back-handed show of gratitude to fans.")
- 2011: The original and prequel trilogies were released on Blu-ray. Alterations were made to all six films.
- 2012: The Phantom Menace was theatrically re-released in 3D, with an additional minor change to one shot.
- 2015: The original and prequel films were released as a digital download. They are identical to their Blu-ray release, except for changes to the opening logos and fanfares. (Note: The 20th Century Fox logo and fanfare were removed from The Empire Strikes Back, Return of the Jedi, and the prequel films as a result of Disney's 2012 acquisition of Lucasfilm. It remained on A New Hope as Fox retained the full rights to the film after the acquisition. As a result, a new fanfare, based on the ending part of "The Rebel Fleet/End Title", from The Empire Strikes Back, composed by John Williams, plays over the 1997 Lucasfilm logo.) The sequel trilogy film The Force Awakens was theatrically released in both standard and IMAX formats.
- 2019: The original and prequel films were released in 4K resolution and HDR on Disney's streaming service, Disney+. (Note: The 20th Century Fox logo and fanfare were restored to the five films they had been removed from in 2015 as a result of Disney's acquisition of 21st Century Fox earlier in 2019. As a result, the News Corporation byline was removed. Furthermore, the 1997 Lucasfilm logo was changed to the 2015 logo.) Color, compositing, and minor effects adjustments were made to all three films of the original trilogy.

== Significant changes ==
=== Star Wars ===
==== Title and opening chase ====
The franchise-originating film was released in 1977, under the title Star Wars. The subtitle Episode IV – A New Hope was retroactively added to the opening crawl for the theatrical re-release on April 10, 1981, to align with the titling of the sequel, Star Wars: Episode V – The Empire Strikes Back (1980). Additionally, the background starfield was changed to the one used in The Empire Strikes Back, "Rebel" was capitalized in the crawl, and the opening chase was recomposited, with a new visual effect for the engines.

==== Tatooine ====
Lucas noted that original Aunt Beru actress Shelagh Fraser sounded a "little British" during filming, prompting the rerecording of her lines for the 1977 mono release. Additionally, the 1977 wide release featured improved blaster lasers and explosions during Han Solo's defense of the Millennium Falcon before it departs Mos Eisley.

A number of scenes on Tatooine were modified for the 1997 Special Edition, most notably an alteration to the Greedo scene and the restoration of a deleted scene featuring Jabba the Hutt. Additionally, during the Galactic Empire's search for the droids, two newly filmed shots of stormtroopers and CGI Dewback lizards were inserted. In another shot, a static Dewback was replaced with a moving CGI version. Writing in Wired magazine, Drew Stewart claimed the rationale for the added content was to illustrate the extent of the Empire's search, but criticized the new shots as "people wandering aimlessly". (Note: Additionally, Stewart notes that though "the dewback model was rebuilt for the prequels ... the test model was left front-and-center in a classic film.")

The sound Obi-Wan Kenobi makes to scare off the Tusken Raiders was changed for the 2004 DVD release and again for the 2011 Blu-ray release. In the scene in which R2-D2 hides in a cave, rocks were inserted in front of the cave for the Blu-ray release. (Note: Stewart claims there is "no visible way" for R2-D2 to have gotten into the cave.)

Other alterations introduced in various releases include a CGI replacement of the Jawa sandcrawler, the replacement of an external shot of Obi-Wan's hut with a new angle showing Luke Skywalker's parked landspeeder, and color and continuity changes involving the binary sunset. The shadow of the landspeeder was redone in one shot, and creatures, robots, and ships were added to Mos Eisley, including elements created for the Shadows of the Empire multimedia campaign. (Note: The computer-generated Imperial landing craft was created for the 1997 release of the film, but first appeared in Shadows of the Empire media.) Some of the aliens in the cantina were replaced with new CGI characters and a shot of the Millennium Falcon fighting its way out of Mos Eisley was added.

===== Greedo =====
Han Solo is cornered in the Mos Eisley cantina by the Rodian bounty hunter Greedo. When Greedo begins threatening him, Han kills him by shooting under the table. The 1997 release of the film alters the scene so that Greedo shoots first and misses (with Han's head digitally pivoting away from the blaster bolt). The scene was changed again for the 2004 DVD release so that Han and Greedo shoot almost simultaneously; this was shortened by several frames for the 2011 Blu-ray release. The scene was further modified for the 2019 4K Ultra HD release with the addition of a close-up shot of Greedo speaking (without subtitles), (Note: The close-up is composed of cropped footage used a few seconds before. The dialogue, transcribed by fans as "maclunkey", is also spoken in The Phantom Menace, where the apparently Huttese phrase is subtitled "This will be the end of you.") as well as the removal of a reverse shot of Greedo, and a re-rendering of the visual effects. (Note: The change was made by Lucas before the 2012 sale of his company to Disney.)

The original version of the Greedo scene is considered iconic, while some consider the altered version one of the most controversial changes to the film. Some fans have coined the phrase "Han shot first" to protest the change, which according to Polygon alters Han's moral ambiguity and his fundamental character. Lucas has stated that he always intended for Greedo to shoot first. In 2015, a copy of an early draft of the Star Wars screenplay was discovered in the archives of the University of New Brunswick library. In the script, dated March 15, 1976, only Han shoots. Greedo actor Paul Blake has also claimed that in the shooting script, Han fired the only shot. Lucas explained that he wanted Han to be a John Wayne-type character who allows his enemy to have the first shot before retaliating. (Note: In various films, such as Riders of Destiny (1933) and Red River (1948), John Wayne's character shoots down his opponent as he draws his pistol.) He claims the original version of the scene portrayed Han as a "cold-blooded killer". Writing in Wired, Matt Blum claimed that Han shot in self-defense, and that it is therefore inaccurate to call him a cold-blooded killer.

===== Jabba the Hutt =====
The original script for Star Wars included a scene with Han and Jabba in a Mos Eisley docking bay. The scene was filmed by a second unit with Declan Mulholland wearing a furry vest as a stand-in for Jabba. Lucas intended to replace Mulholland in post-production with a stop-motion character, but cut the entire scene due to time limitations and budget constraints, and because he felt it was superfluous to the film without the sequels. In the 1997 Special Edition, the scene was reinserted with a CGI Jabba replacing Mulholland. This was an early example of a fully CGI, speaking character in a film. The character preceded Jar Jar Binks in The Phantom Menace by two years, who was a combination of CGI and motion capture. To explain Jabba's mobility despite his sluglike form, artist Claudia Mullaly conceived of repulsorlifts (one of which he sits upright in), but this concept was dropped.

In the original footage, Harrison Ford walked through the area where Jabba's tail would be. As a workaround, Han was digitally moved to appear as if he steps on Jabba's tail, with the Hutt squealing as a result. This part of the scene has been poorly received, including by its original animator Steve Williams. Boba Fett and several Rodians (at least one of whom is a look-alike of Greedo in the background) also appear in the scene, with Fett seeming to break the fourth wall.

The insertion of this scene was criticized for being superfluous and slowing down the pace of the narrative. Critics also claimed that it undermined the introduction of both the Millennium Falcon (in the following scene) and Jabba (in Return of the Jedi, portrayed via a massive and costly puppet). The 1997 CGI Jabba has been described as "atrocious" and for the 2004 DVD release was replaced with a higher-resolution model resembling the one in The Phantom Menace. On the 2004 DVD audio commentary for A New Hope, Lucas said that while he did not mind cutting the scene when he was not sure if he could make sequels, he reintroduced it because Jabba is important to Han's larger story arc. ScreenCrush later called the 2004 version "an improvement, but only in the way that nausea is an improvement over vomit".

==== Luke's lightsaber ====
During the training scene aboard the Millennium Falcon, Luke's lightsaber—which in some releases had erroneously appeared green—was corrected to blue in the 2011 release.

==== Death Star ====
For the Special Edition, shots of Imperial officers being shot by Han and Luke as they infiltrate the Death Star were partially edited out to omit the most extreme violence. Additionally, a scene of Han chasing a squad of stormtroopers was altered to replace the appearance of several stormtroopers at the end of the corridor with dozens in formation. Den of Geek criticized the change as being "too much" and making Han's shooting back at them less believable. Two Screen Rant writers call the updated version "utterly ridiculous" but "much funnier". Another shot of a stormtrooper hitting his head on a door had a sound effect added in 2004, making it seem like the goof was intentional.

In the original version of Obi-Wan and Darth Vader's duel, Obi-Wan's saber appeared to "short out" when foreshortened toward the camera (a result of the in-camera effects failing to account for this viewing angle). A glow was added in 2004, and a fully finished blade was added to these shots in 2019. Also in the 2019 version, Obi-Wan's lightsaber was adjusted to appear consistently blue, and the flash effects of the lightsabers clashing were redone.

Starting with the 1997 edition, both the explosions of Alderaan and the Death Star had shockwaves added to them, using an Industrial Light & Magic visual effect repurposed from Star Trek VI: The Undiscovered Country (1991).

==== Yavin 4 ====
The matte painting of the exterior of the Rebel base on Yavin 4 and the background clouds in the shot of the X-wing fighters departing were improved for the 1977 wide release.

The Special Edition of A New Hope incorporated a deleted scene on Yavin 4, in which Luke is briefly reunited with his childhood friend Biggs Darklighter. This was felt by some to strengthen the relationship of the characters during the climactic Death Star attack run. (Note: Wired writes, "The one interesting part of the [full version of the cut scene] was how Red Leader mentioned flying with Luke's father, a possible tie to the prequels ... cut out by having a technician walk across the screen and hiding the cut dialog with a time jump. Unfortunately, this is done poorly, as the missing time is reflected by R2's literal jump by several feet in his rise to the X-wing.") The scene also included the appearance of Red X-Wing Squadron Leader Garven Dreis, an addition that pleased his portrayor, Drewe Henley.

The original film includes a two-shot sequence of X-wings flying past Yavin towards the Death Star (showing the fighters from behind, then the front). For the 1997 edition, these were replaced with a 180° turn of CGI X-wings (seen from the front, then the back). Wired points out that the addition of the moon (Yavin 4) in the background places it "very clearly in range of the Death Star from the very beginning of the battle". Additionally, engine sounds were added to the battle scene which make parts of the musical score difficult to hear.

=== The Empire Strikes Back ===
According to Lucas, The Empire Strikes Back contains the most changes, although are mostly limited to compositing (e.g. during the Hoth battle), with only a few scenes being significantly altered. Christopher Miller, who later worked on Solo: A Star Wars Story (2018), claimed that he played a stormtrooper added to the film's Special Edition while an intern at Lucasfilm.

==== Hoth ====
Close-up shots of the wampa that captures Luke on Hoth were inserted. (Note: According to WhatCulture and Wired, the additional shots show a redesigned and more fully realized wampa—which may reflect the original intent of the filmmakers—but the addition unnecessarily altered the decision to leave the monster largely to the imagination.)

==== The Emperor's hologram ====
For his appearance as a hologram in The Empire Strikes Back, the Emperor was originally portrayed by masked actress Marjorie Eaton and voice actor Clive Revill. For the 2004 DVD edition and subsequent releases, this was replaced by new footage of Ian McDiarmid, who plays the character in later films. (Note: Prequel actor Hayden Christensen stood in as Vader during the filming, which occurred during the production of Revenge of the Sith (2005).) The dialogue was changed in the new version, making Vader seem to have been unaware of Luke's paternity despite knowing his last name.

ScreenCrush argues that the change is the worst to any Star Wars film, owing to the altered dialogue. Wired writes that it is unclear whether the new dialogue is meant to portray Vader and the Emperor "deliberately testing one another", and also that McDiarmid "looks more like he did 20 years before in the timeline than he does a year later in Return of the Jedi". Sources such as Polygon and io9 regard the actor replacement itself as logical, and Screen Rant praises it as "a change that blends seamlessly with the original film, due in large part to the relative ease of swapping one holographic image for another".

==== Boba Fett ====
Boba Fett's dialogue in the film was originally recorded by Jason Wingreen. Subsequently, Attack of the Clones revealed Boba to be a clone of Jango Fett, played by Temuera Morrison. To reflect this, Morrison rerecorded Wingreen's lines for the 2004 edition of the film. (Note: Wired criticizes the change, writing, "This might make sense if it wasn't for the fact that accents aren't genetic. Jango died 25 years earlier, it's highly unlikely Boba would still sound exactly like his father, even if they were genetically identical." Fett was later reprised by Morrison for the post-Return of the Jedi live-action streaming series The Mandalorian and The Book of Boba Fett.)

In the shot when the Millennium Falcon detaches from the Star Destroyer, Boba Fett's ship, the Slave I, was replaced with a CGI version following the Falcon more closely. Both WhatCulture and Wired opine that the change makes it hard to believe that Han could not see Fett.

==== Cloud City ====
New establishing shots were added to Cloud City, which according to Lucas were added partially because director Irvin Kershner was dissatisfied with the limitations of the location's set. The shots include new buildings that seem to disappear when the original matte paintings are shown. Similarly, windows were added to a number of interior shots, but do not appear in others. An interior corridor was reworked to become an open balcony with a low rail, the reflection of which erroneously passes through those of the characters. New shots of Cloud City's citizens reacting to Lando Calrissian's evacuation orders were also added. (Note: A Wired writer opines that "The frantic pace of our heroes trying to escape is now interrupted by shots of characters we've never seen and will never see again.")

In the 1997 edition, the scene of Luke dropping down the chute to escape Vader was modified to include an audible scream—created using the sound of the Emperor screaming as he falls down the shaft in Return of the Jedi; this received criticism and was removed in later releases.

==== Ending ====
Following the initial limited theatrical release, Lucas added three exterior shots to the denouement to clarify that Lando and Chewbacca are on the Falcon, not the Rebel frigate that Luke, Leia, and the droids are on.

In the 1997 edition, a line of Vader's dialogue as he prepares to depart Cloud City was replaced, and a shot of his shuttle landing in his Star Destroyer was inserted (using stock footage for Return of the Jedi) into the sequence in which Luke and Leia communicate via the Force. Wired calls this "Yet another addition that answers a question no one had."

=== Return of the Jedi ===
With the Blu-ray release, the Ewoks now blink. This detail was hoped for during the original production, but was abandoned due to practical limitations of the costumes.

==== Jabba's palace ====
In the Special Edition, an establishing shot of a bantha herd was inserted, and a CGI beak and extra tentacles were added to the sarlacc. Jabba's dialogue was given subtitles, although C-3PO translates most of his lines. The 2011 edition extends the front door of Jabba's palace as seen from the outside to make it appear about three times wider. The Blu-ray also added a Dug to the inside of the palace, which was criticized as standing out from puppet aliens in the same scene.

The scene in which Jabba feeds the dancer Oola to his rancor opens with a performance by the Max Rebo Band and its lead singer, Sy Snootles. In the original theatrical release, the song is "Lapti Nek", sung in the fictional language Huttese. The Special Edition changed the performance to the new song "Jedi Rocks", which mostly received negative criticism. Polygon's Owen Good describes the new vocals as difficult to listen to and having "the volume and vocal fry of a higher pitched Tina Turner but none of the soul". (Note: Owen Good writes that the new material in Jabba's palace is "an overproduced intrusion that takes twice as long to add nothing" and distracts from the scene's intention: to establish the trapdoor leading to the rancor and the Hutt's deadliness. A Wired writer argues that the additions crowded the scene with unsatisfactory CGI. Den of Geek notes that the change negatively altered the tone of the scene and only "replaced one flawed effect with another", writing that "What was once a low-key yet appealing background moment in the movie's first act [has] grown into ... an in-your-face audio-visual spectacle".) The puppet used for Snootles was also replaced with CGI. According to Special Edition producer Rick McCallum, this change was made because Lucas could not originally achieve the "large musical number" he envisioned because characters could not move in certain ways; Snootles could not open her mouth to lip sync correctly, and her eyes did not move. The Special Edition increased the size of the Max Rebo Band from three members to twelve. Additional footage was filmed of Boba Fett flirting with one of the dancers; original Fett actor Jeremy Bulloch thought this was somewhat contrary to the character's nature.

In the theatrical release of the film, Oola's death is filmed from outside the rancor pit: she falls into the pit, and her scream is heard from off-screen. In the 1997 edition, extra shots were inserted depicting her in the pit, including shots where she looks up to the crowd, the pit door being raised, and a shot of her terror. The rancor and Oola as she screams remain off-screen. Femi Taylor, who played Oola, impressed critics with her ability to reprise the role over a decade later without visible difference. Wired notes that "they put a different eyeshadow color on her, so she's not exactly seamless." James Whitbrook at io9 praised the additions to the scene, writing that it teased the rancor well while still keeping the monster a surprise for Luke's later battle with it. Conversely, Den of Geek UK criticized the additions as unnecessary and felt that they made the audience familiar with the pit, weakening Luke's scene.

In 2004, Lucas revealed that he had considered adding a shot of Fett escaping the sarlacc, but decided against it because it would have detracted from the scene's focus: Jabba's death. Fett's survival was eventually depicted in the Disney+ live-action streaming series The Mandalorian (2019–2023) and The Book of Boba Fett (2021–2022).

==== Climax on the second Death Star ====
At the climax of the film, the Emperor tortures Luke with Force lightning on the second Death Star, prompting Vader to throw the Emperor down a chasm. In the original version of the scene, Vader has no dialogue. Starting with the 2011 edition, Vader mutters "No" and then yells a drawn-out "No!", creating a parallel with his near-identical cry at the end of Revenge of the Sith. This addition was described as being unnecessary at best, and at worst being clumsy, sounding terrible, and seeming to mock the scene in the prequel. A Polygon writer argues that the change displays a distrust in the audience's ability to interpret Vader's emotions and further that it made the emotional scene "laughable".

In the scene where Anakin Skywalker is unmasked, the 2004 edition digitally removed his eyebrows to reflect Anakin burning on Mustafar at the end of Revenge of the Sith.

Like A New Hope, since 1997 the explosion of the second Death Star also has an added shockwave.

==== Victory celebration ====
The film ends with a scene of the Rebel Alliance and a village of Ewoks on Endor celebrating the death of the Emperor and victory over the Empire. The original theatrical release of the film features the song "Ewok Celebration", also known as "Yub Nub", playing over the celebration. The 1997 edition release of the film replaced "Ewok Celebration" with score composed by John Williams titled "Victory Celebration", and the scene was lengthened to include shots of celebration on the planets Coruscant, Bespin, and Tatooine. The 2004 edition further added a shot set on Naboo, in which a Gungan is given a line of dialogue, and added the Senate building and Jedi Temple to Coruscant. The concept for the interplanetary montage was discussed during the film's pre-production.

==== Anakin's Force spirit ====
Near the end of the film, Vader kills the Emperor to save Luke's life, then dies of his injuries. He later appears to Luke as the Force spirit of Anakin, alongside Yoda and Obi-Wan. In the original version, Sebastian Shaw plays the spirit, as well as the unmasked Vader. Because Hayden Christensen played Anakin in the prequel films Attack of the Clones and Revenge of the Sith, the 2004 DVD edition of Return of the Jedi features Christensen as the spirit, replacing Shaw. In a 2005 conversation with Christensen, Lucas explained the change in this way: "When you come back to the good side of the Force, it's your former persona that survives, not the Darth Vader persona." The alteration was ranked as the worst change to the original trilogy by Den of Geek. The Digital Bits notes that the 2019 restoration made it more obvious where Anakin's head was replaced.

=== The Phantom Menace ===
The DVD released in 2001 features a longer version of the podrace sequence, as well as a brief scene on Coruscant focusing on Anakin and Jar Jar Binks. The 2011 Blu-ray incorporates a CGI Yoda. For the 2012 3D re-release, the end of Anakin's magnetic wand was redesigned in one shot of the podrace.

==== Podrace sequence ====
The extended podrace includes a longer introduction of the racers and the second lap of the race, which Screen Rant says does not contribute to the story, and potentially negatively affects the film's pacing. Additionally, shots including Watto cheering for Anakin's rival Sebulba were removed for home media releases.

==== CGI Yoda ====
In the original version of The Phantom Menace, a puppet was used to portray Yoda except in two wide shots which required CGI. This was changed for the 2011 release, with the puppet being replaced with a CGI model, similar to those used for the film's sequels, Attack of the Clones and Revenge of the Sith.

=== Attack of the Clones ===
A few special effects which were not ready for the initial wide release were completed for release in digital-projection theaters. The DVD features the digital version with some extended lines of dialogue. The 2011 edition features a small editing change to the Coruscant speeder chase, adds a voiceover to Anakin's vision of Shmi, and changes the order of shots depicting Count Dooku's escape.

=== Revenge of the Sith ===
The theatrical release had a diagonal wipe from Obi-Wan leaving Mustafar to Anakin using his hand to crawl from the lava. The DVD changed this to a direct cut, which was reverted on the Blu-ray. The latter release also has additional clone trooper dialogue as they land on Utapau, and added moss to the treehouse on Kashyyyk.

== Reception ==
Various media outlets have cited certain changes to the original trilogy as being particularly egregious. These include: in A New Hope, making Greedo shoot first (which has been especially criticized for playing tricks with viewers' minds and memories) and the restored Jabba scene; in The Empire Strikes Back, changes to the Emperor's dialogue (and appearance); in Return of the Jedi, the new song in Jabba's palace, Vader yelling "No!" at the climax, and Christensen replacing Shaw as Anakin's spirit.

In 2015, Lance Ulanoff of Mashable viewed the original theatrical print of Star Wars submitted to the Library of Congress, and noted merit to Lucas's belief that technology did not allow him to achieve his vision, citing a visible marquee around Leia's ship "so jarring that it temporarily pulls me out of the film" because the original print is "lack[ing] the seamless quality [he has] come to expect from sci-fi and fantasy". Despite this, Ulanoff wrote that he "hate[s] each and every one" of the later added CGI effects. In 2017, a writer argued that the Special Edition changes to the original Star Wars "stripped the film of every aspect that it had won its Academy Awards for", including those for Best Visual Effects, Best Production Design, and Best Original Score.

A smaller number of changes have been cited as improving the films or not harming them. A 2015 Polygon article claimed there was "solid logic" behind a number of the minor changes, such as adding windows to Cloud City or sparks to Jango Fett's jetpack, saying these "angered, to a close approximation, nobody". A New Hope's restored Biggs scene has garnered mostly favorable feedback. In 2021, Screen Rant praised special effects additions to A New Hope, including the CGI Dewback replacement, the Mos Eisley establishing shots, and the explosions of Alderaan and the Death Star. A consistent minority viewpoint has held that the net total of changes improves the films more than it detracts from them.

== Legacy ==
The master negatives of the original trilogy were reportedly dismantled in order to create the Special Editions, although high-quality duplicates known as separation masters exist (also used as a source for the 1997 versions). In 1997, Lucas stated, "There will only be one [version of each film] ... The [original] will be some sort of interesting artifact ... [that] will disappear. ... A hundred years from now, the only version of the movie that anyone will remember will be the DVD version." Asked why he was opposed to releasing the original versions of the films alongside the modified versions, Lucas stated in 2004: "To me, [the original movie] doesn't really exist anymore. ... I'm sorry you saw half a completed film and fell in love with it. But I want it to be the way I want it to be." Lucas has said the Special Edition of a A New Hope brought the film from representing 60% of his vision to 80%.

Gary Kurtz, producer of A New Hope and The Empire Strikes Back, spoke against changing films retroactively in a 2002 interview. He stated, "I'm just not a great believer in messing with what is done. It may not be perfect, and as I said a long time ago, there's nothing that is." Addressing the Special Editions, he said,

... fixing a few matte lines and adding a couple of spaceships into shots is fine. I don't think anybody would notice that. But actually adding scenes that don't make any difference ... and all of those digitally enhanced shots of robots floating around and creatures walking through the frame ... call attention to themselves. Are much worse, actually, I think. Primarily because CGI work ... done by ILM, which is the best there is ... does not fit in with the mechanical style of the original film.

Lucas's name is sometimes used as a shorthand verb for the act of retroactively altering a film. In early 2002, filmmaker (and friend of Lucas) Steven Spielberg re-released E.T. the Extra-Terrestrial in a digitally altered 20th-anniversary Special Edition, which notably replaced guns carried by federal agents with walkie-talkies. (Note: Spielberg later stated that he would not digitally alter his films in the future and insisted that viewers watch the original version of E.T..) This prompted the creators of South Park to parody both Spielberg and Lucas's changes to their films in an episode of their show. In 2007, Family Guy lampooned Christensen's appearance as a spirit, and in 2017 comedian Brian Posehn stated that the original trilogy "already was special". Lucas's changes have become a primary point of reference for retroactive changes to other films.

A number of errors remain in the latest version of the Star Wars films. For instance, Sebulba is unrendered in a brief shot in The Phantom Menace, which special-effects supervisor John Knoll called attention to in the film's 2001 DVD commentary. Craig Elvy of Screen Rant said, "This highlights how George Lucas' motivations for tweaking the Star Wars movies are more about improving and updating than removing imperfections".

In 2019, Kathleen Kennedy, president of Lucasfilm since the 2012 acquisition of the company by Disney, stated that she would not make alterations to Lucas's original trilogy, because "those will always remain his." While promoting The Rise of Skywalker, director J. J. Abrams expressed his hopes that the original versions of the trilogy would be officially released, but said that the powers that be had told him "that that's not necessarily possible". (Note: Abrams further said that when making The Force Awakens, he had gotten into a disagreement about the dialogue between Vader and the Emperor in The Empire Strikes Back before realizing that different versions of the film were being referred to; he cited the Despecialized Editions of the films, while the other party had recalled the reworded dialogue.) On whether he thought the sequel trilogy should be altered at some point, Abrams stated, "I respect anyone who feels like they want to go back and adjust and add; I get that. But I also feel like ... [when] you're done with a thing, ... that's what it is." Contrarily, some media outlets have called for the climax of The Rise of Skywalker to be altered to show the Force ghosts of the Jedi who aid Rey. Fan pleas for a director's cut of the film trended on social media following the release of Zack Snyder's Justice League. (Note: Shortly after the release of The Rise of Skywalker, a rumor was circulated concerning an alleged "Abrams cut" of the film, which was quickly debunked. A subsequent unsubstantiated rumor claimed that George Lucas would release his own version.)

In 2023, when asked if he had the clout to influence Lucasfilm to release the original cuts of the original trilogy, The Mandalorian creator Jon Favreau answered, "Do you think anybody but ... the people who grew up with it ... would care?" He went on to explain his view that "younger people have a whole different perception of what Star Wars is." When asked about the possibility of releasing the original versions in 2024, Lucas reiterated, "I'm a firm believer that the director or the writer or the filmmaker should have a right to have his movie be the way he wants it." (Note: In 2026, Lucas stated that he viewed the edited films as now "actually finished" and that the negative fan feedback ignored the "alternate versions and all kinds of stuff" found in fan films.) After the British Film Institute screened the unaltered original film in June 2025, some reviewers noted that it felt like a completely different film than what they were used to, opining that it had an aesthetic low quality without the minor technological improvements of later versions. Film critic Robbie Collin cited the analogue aesthetic as lending humor to comedic interactions between C-3PO and R2-D2 and wrote that the Death Star control panels looked like "wooden boards with lights stuck on" and were thus "better attuned to the frequency of make-believe".
