= Bantha =

Star Wars race

- Star Wars race
- A Tusken Raider riding a bantha on Tatooine in a scene from Star Wars (1977)
- First appearance: Star Wars (1977)
- Created by: George Lucas

In-universe information
- Home world: Tatooine; Others
- Sub-races: Common bantha; Dune bantha; Dwarf bantha; Kashyyyk bantha; Swamp bantha
- Distinctions: Horns; Long hair; 4 legs; Produce blue milk

Banthas are fictional creatures in the Star Wars franchise. They are large, quadrupedal mammals with long, thick fur, and are first seen in the film Star Wars (1977), where they are used as beasts of burden by Tusken Raiders on the planet Tatooine. They have since been featured in several other Star Wars works, including the Special Edition version of Return of the Jedi (1983), the prequel films The Phantom Menace (1999) and Attack of the Clones (2002), and the television shows Star Wars: The Clone Wars, The Mandalorian, and The Book of Boba Fett, as well as video games and books.

One of the first creatures introduced in the Star Wars franchise, banthas were created by George Lucas, who was inspired in part by creatures called Banths in John Carter of Mars. Ralph McQuarrie designed the concept art for the banthas, with original sketches depicting them as horse-like creatures before they were changed to be elephant-sized. Art director Leon Erickson led the creation of the bantha costume for Star Wars, the base of which was an elephant saddle with palm fronds and yak hair to create a shaggy coat, as well as a head mask molded from chicken wire, curved horns made from ventilation tubing, and a tail crafted from wood covered with thick thistles.

The bantha's moan was created by sound designer Ben Burtt, who slowed down a bear sound originally collected to help create the voice of the Wookiee character Chewbacca. The banthas in Star Wars were portrayed by a female Asian elephant named Mardji, who was provided by the Marine World Africa USA amusement park. Her scenes were filmed in Death Valley National Park in California, and Mardji kept shrugging the heavy costume off her body during filming due to the intense heat.

The elephant's gait served as the model for the movement of AT-AT walkers in The Empire Strikes Back (1980), and banthas also inspired the creation of the luggabeast creature in Star Wars: The Force Awakens (2015) and the Corellian hounds in Solo: A Star Wars Story (2018). Banthas that have appeared in subsequent Star Wars films and shows were digital creations modeled after the creature from Star Wars. The bantha shares characteristics with several real-life animals, including bighorn sheep, muskoxen, woolly mammoths, and domestic yaks, and its use of fur to help insulate itself from excess heat is a trait shared by such animals as the antelope, camel, and jerboa. The bantha has been described as a favorite among fans, as well as the cast and crew of the films; Anthony Daniels, the actor who portrayed C-3PO, called it "one of the best things in the movie".

== Biology and characteristics ==
Banthas are large, quadrupedal mammals with long, thick fur of brown or black. The creatures have long, furry tails, and a pair of spiraling horns extruded from their skulls, which resemble those of the real-life bighorn sheep, as well as the muskox, one of the inspirations behind the bantha. Star Wars books and media have established biological details about the bantha that go beyond the creature's appearances in the films and television shows. About 8 to 10 ft (2.4 to 3.0 m) in height, banthas breathe oxygen, have a lifespan of 80 to 100 years, a gestation period of 30 months, and reach sexual maturation at 20 years of age. They weigh 50 kg (110 lb) at birth and reach weights of up to 4,000 kg (8,800 lb) at maturity. Banthas are extremely strong, capable of carrying up to 500 kilograms of cargo or an average of five passengers. Their planet of origin is unknown, but since they could be found on most agricultural systems, it was believed early settlers transported them to new worlds. Works of Star Wars media have established that bantha remains have been discovered that predate most known species in the franchise.

Although often associated with the planet of Tatooine, banthas can be found on many worlds in the Star Wars universe and have adapted to a variety of climates and terrains, ranging from deserts to tundra. Rather than serving as a hindrance in the heat of the desert planet of Tatooine, bantha fur helped insulate the animal and keep away excess cold or heat. This is a characteristic shared with several real-life desert animals, including the antelope, camel, and jerboa. Since the heat generated by a sun is absorbed by the fur on the bantha's back, it prevents the heat from penetrating deeper into the creature's skin, helping it survive even in harsh conditions. Science writer Sandhya Ramesh noted that large bodies have greater thermal inertia, meaning the bantha's large body would be more difficult to heat them up compared than those of smaller animals, making it well suited to survive in Tatooine's harsh environment. Marcus Schneck of The Patriot-News has noted the bantha shares similarities to the domestic yak, a bulky, hairy animal used by humans for transportation and food.

Bantha horns grow a new segment each year, and the strength of a given creature's horns are indicative of its health and environment: thick, crenellated horns usually signify that the bantha is well fed and healthy, while thin, cracked, or underdeveloped horns indicate the bantha is unhealthy due to drought or famine. Male banthas develop thicker and longer horns than females, and males typically complete two horn spirals over the course of their lifetimes, while females usually only complete one. The horns of male banthas could reach a width of up to 3 meters at the shoulders. Bantha horns sometimes become locked when they fight each other, which can lead to exhaustion and death, particularly in difficult terrains like Tatooine. Banthas have a long tongue that help the animal compensate for its short neck when eating and drinking. The bantha tongue is highly sensitive, structurally complex, and very strong, containing gripping knobs at the end and spiracles along the edges for scenting. The tongue can be used for probing into the ground for food or water, holding and carrying items, and as a signifier for communications with other members of the species. Banthas also have extremely sharp incisors.

Although only one type of bantha is shown in the Star Wars film (known as a "common bantha"), other media from the franchise have established that multiple sub-species of banthas exist, each varying in size, social behavior, metabolic specifics, and coloration. Among these sub-species are dwarf banthas and dune banthas. Dwarf banthas are smaller and more shy than the common bantha, living in remote outer areas, while dune banthas are more slender and less furry, and able to survive in very high temperatures with relatively little water. The Kashyyyk bantha is a sub-species adapted to survive on the Wookiee planet of Kashyyyk, which lacks the shaggy coat and horns of a common bantha and instead has large bony plates used as battering rams. The Kilian bantha, a type native to the planet Kilia IV, was another sub-species.

== Behavior and culture ==
According to Star Wars works, banthas are herbivores, with a peaceful and docile manner, surviving on grasses and other native flora. Due to their size and internal reserves, they can survive up to a month without food or water. Highly intelligent creatures, they can be found both in the wild and domesticated. Banthas are extremely social pack animals who travel in herds. which can reach sizes of up to 25 individuals. Banthas are non-confrontational and usually flee when attacked, fighting only when necessary to defend the herd or their young. When they do fight, banthas attack by lowering their heads and ramming their horns against attacks, and adult banthas form a circle around their calves to protect them from threats. Despite their gentle temperaments, the size and strength of banthas often lead them to be used as beasts of burden and animals of war, with riders spurring them to charge at foes and trample them. Banthas have few natural enemies, and the only creature that hunts them for food are krayt dragons, massive carnivorous reptiles even larger in size than banthas.

Banthas in the wild belong to a matriarchal social system, and are led by the oldest, strongest, and most capable female in the herd. Matriarchs are most responsible for protecting the others for dangerous predators, though a lone male bantha often acts as a sentry for the herds. As the matriarch ages, she relinquishes control of the herd to the next qualified female bantha candidate. If a herd grows too large in size, it will occasionally split, with the second-oldest and strongest female becoming the matriarch of the new herd. Banthas treat the remains of their ancestors with a sense of reverence, gathering their bones into special areas known as "bantha graveyards" and fondling the bones with their tongues. Mothers have carried deceased newborn banthas many kilometers to these graveyards. Other species consider it bad luck to enter a bantha graveyard.

Star Wars books and media outside the films have established that banthas are an integral part of the culture of Tusken Raiders on Tatooine, with a deep spiritual and emotional connection developing between each bantha and its Tusken rider. When a Tusken Raider reaches age seven, a bantha of the same gender is ceremonially presented to the child as its partner in life. The young Tusken cares for and raises the bantha as it grows, and once it reaches maturity, the Tusken rides it and takes it into the desert for initiatory ceremonies and tasks. When Tusken Raiders marry, the couple's banthas also mate, and when the Tusken couple has children the banthas will often produce offspring as well. When a Tusken Raider dies, the bantha is sent into the desert to find another bonding partner; however, the bond between the Tusken and bantha is so strong that banthas would often fall into depression or commit suicide in such cases. Likewise, if a bantha dies before its Tusken Raider, the Tusken clan would cast that Raider into the desert on a vision quest, to either die in isolation or be adopted by another wild bantha. If the latter occurs, the Tusken is allowed to return to his or her tribe. No other cultures or species share such a bond with banthas.

Other species have used bantha hides for clothing, with such items as bantha-skin boots and carrying cases fetching high prices. Bantha meat has often been processed for food and beverages, and "bantha steaks" are a common food in works of Star Wars media. In one scene from the original Star Wars film, Luke Skywalker's aunt Beru pours a cup of what is known as "blue milk"; it is later established that the milk comes from banthas. Bantha blue milk has reappeared in several Star Wars films, books, games, and other mediums, including the film Rogue One (2016), and is sold as a real-life beverage at the Star Wars Galaxy's Edge, the Star Wars themed area within Disneyland in Anaheim, California. Fictional bantha hides make an alcoholic drink when mixed with fermented grain. One such drink is called "Jawa Juice", named after the Jawa alien species, which is served to Obi-Wan Kenobi at a restaurant in a scene from Attack of the Clones (2002). A flying reptile species on Tatooine known as skettos would gather loose wool from the backs of banthas for use in building nests. Tusken Raiders collect the bones of deceased banthas for use as tent supports and other purposes.

== Star Wars appearances ==
Banthas first appear in Star Wars (1977), the first film in the original Star Wars trilogy, during a scene in which protagonist Luke Skywalker is stalked and attacked by Tusken Raiders in a region of Tatooine known as the Jundland Wastes. After observing Luke from afar, the Tuskens mount their nearby banthas and begin their approach to ambush him. Luke later uses binoculars to survey the area and spots two banthas and a Tusken Raider in the distance, before another Tusken surprise attacks him and renders him unconscious. Other works of Star Wars media have established that the specific bantha most prominently featured in the film was a male named R'rrr'ur'R, whose name is similar to the guttural sounds of the Tusken language. According to his backstory, R'rrr'ur'R had been the alpha male of his herd before he was raised by the Tusken Raider RR'uruurrr for the personal use of URoRRuR'R'R, the leader of the tribe. Later in the film, while Luke and Obi-Wan Kenobi are surveying the wreckage of a destroyed sandcrawler, Kenobi correctly assesses that the craft was attacked not by Tusken Raiders but by Imperial stormtroopers serving the Galactic Empire. He reaches this conclusion by noting that the footprints left by the attackers were side by side, whereas Tusken Raiders and their banthas travel in single file to hide their numbers.

Chewbacca's son Lumpawaroo plays with a plush toy version of a bantha in the Star Wars Christmas Special (1978), and comedian Harvey Korman appears in the special as a four-armed alien chef and parody of Julia Child, who cooks a meal called "Bantha Surprise". Banthas have played a part in stories for the Star Wars: The Roleplaying Game first published in 1987, including a bantha stampede caused by Tusken Raiders as an attack against the players. The game also introduced the Dim-U, a cult-like sect of monks that worship banthas as deities, believing the creatures' far-reaching presence on multiple worlds was a sign of a message from a higher power.

A shot of digitally-created banthas traveling in a herd was added to the Special Edition version of Return of the Jedi released in 1997.

In the Special Edition version of Return of the Jedi (1983) released in 1997, a shot with a herd of banthas walking through the Tatooine desert was added to the film, just before the scene in which the sail barge vehicle of the character Jabba the Hutt passes. Star Wars creator George Lucas said he added the shot because it allowed him to expand the environment of the fictional universe and add more nuance to the setting of the film. Banthas appear in two of the Star Wars prequel trilogy films. In the first film, The Phantom Menace (1999), a bantha can be seen in the background when the characters Qui-Gon Jinn, Padmé Amidala, and Jar Jar Binks enter the Tatooine city of Mos Espa. In the second film, Attack of the Clones (2002), a small herd of banthas are present in another scene set in Mos Espa, next to a docking bay where Anakin Skywalker and Padmé land their ship.

A shot of two banthas being observed through a pair of binoculars in Star Wars (1977) (above) was referenced in a similar shot in a 2019 episode of the television series The Mandalorian (below).

Banthas have appeared in the 3D CGI television series Star Wars: The Clone Wars, once again on the planet Tatooine, and have been mentioned in the television shows Star Wars Rebels, and Star Wars Resistance. A bantha doll can be seen in the bedroom of Torra Doza in "The High Tower", the fifth episode of Resistance, which first aired on October 28, 2018. Obi-Wan Kenobi walks among a herd of banthas in the 20th issue of the Star Wars comic book series by Marvel Comics. In the issue, released on June 15, 2016, Kenobi speaks to the banthas as if they are friends, referring to two in particular by the names Dolo and Nara. Banthas were also featured in an episode of The Mandalorian, a Star Wars television series featured on the streaming service Disney+. The episode, entitled "Chapter 5: The Gunslinger", was first made available on December 6, 2019. In it, the title character and a bounty hunter named Toro Calican search Tatooine for a mercenary named Fennec Shand. During the search, Toro looks through a pair of binoculars and spots two banthas and their accompanying Tusken Raiders in the distance, a first-person camera angle that references a similar shot from the original Star Wars film when Luke Skywalker observes the banthas through binoculars.

Banthas appear in several Star Wars video games, including as minor villain characters that Luke Skywalker can fight in Super Star Wars, the 1992 video game for Super Nintendo. They also appear as a creature the player-controlled character can ride in Star Wars Jedi Knight: Jedi Academy (2003), Lego Star Wars II: The Original Trilogy (2006), Star Wars: The Old Republic (2008), Disney Infinity 3.0 (2015), and the upcoming Lego Star Wars: The Skywalker Saga (2020). In Star Wars: Battlefront (2004), the player who is killed the most often in some games receives an award called "bantha fodder". The word "bantha" has been used throughout other Star Wars stories. The hovercraft that Jabba the Hutt used to transport the imprisoned Luke Skywalker, Han Solo, and Chewbacca to the Sarlacc monster in Return of the Jedi was called a "Bantha-II cargo skiff". One alcoholic drink often consumed at the Jabba's palace was called a "Bantha Blaster", and one type of space vessel was named the Bantha-class assault shuttle. Additionally, in the television series Star Wars: A Clone Wars, Anakin Skywalker orders his starfighter squadron to use a single-file starfighter formation known as the "Bantha formation". A children's story called "The Little Lost Bantha Cub" is featured in the Jedi Academy trilogy of novels released in 1994, and a restaurant and entertainment complex called Bantha Traxx appears in the Star Wars: The Roleplaying Game, which included a gift shop that sold toy banthas.

== Concept and creation ==
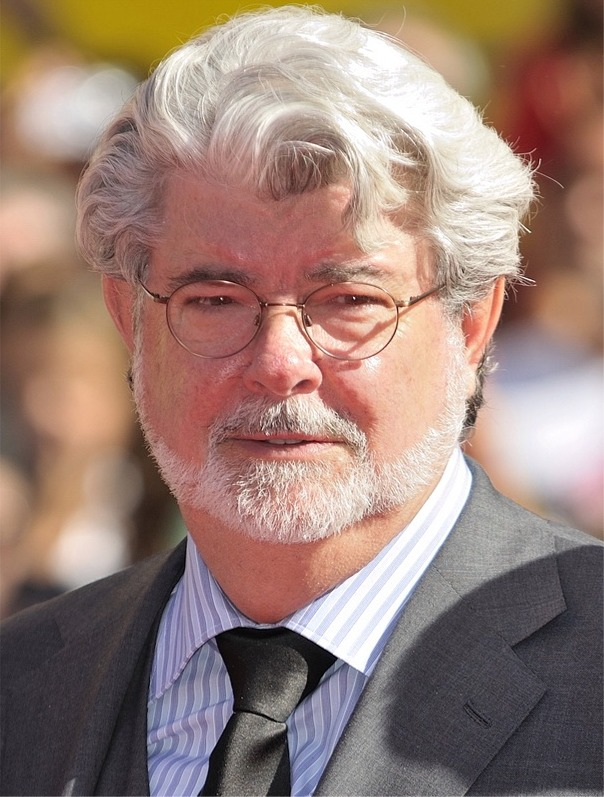
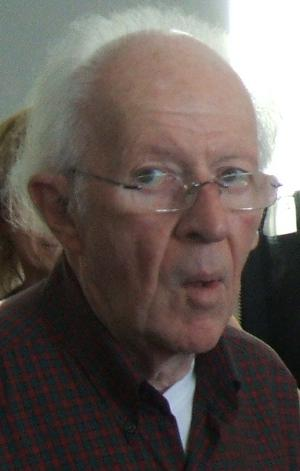
Banthas were created by George Lucas (left), with production illustrator Ralph McQuarrie right) designing the early concept art for the creatures.

Banthas were created by George Lucas, who was inspired in part by Banths, lion-like carnivorous creatures in the science fantasy serial story John Carter of Mars. They were one of the first creatures introduced in the Star Wars universe, with the first use of a variation of the word "bantha" appearing in an early Star Wars film draft from May 1974, in which an antagonist Sith character had the callsign "Banta Four". A second version of this draft, dated January 1978, featured a Rebel starfighter pilot with the callsign "Banta One" during the attack on the Death Star. The first mention of banthas as a creature was in the third draft of the screenplay from August 1975, which described a group of Tusken Raiders riding "monstrous banthas", and includes a scene in which the creatures attack Luke Skywalker after he spots them. Ralph McQuarrie, a production illustrator on Star Wars, designed the early concept art for the banthas. The original sketches depicted them as horse-like creatures, but with other attributes ultimately used in the final design, including a shaggy coat and two horns around the animal's mouth. The Tusken Raiders that would be riding banthas were at this time envisioned to be a smaller alien species, and once they were changed to the size of fully-grown humans, the banthas were changed to be the size of elephants.

The bantha was created through the visual effects company Industrial Light & Magic. Art director Leon Erickson created the bantha costume, leading a crew of six total crew members in the work. It took about one month to finish it. The base of the costume was a howdah, or elephant saddle, with palm fronds added to create the bantha's shaggy coat. Yak hair was also used to create the fur. A head mask was molded from chicken wire and sprayed with foam to create the creature's facial features, and a beard made from horse hair was added. The bantha's curved horns were made from flexible home ventilation tubing, and its tail was crafted from wood covered with thick thistles. Early plans called for the tail to be carried in the air as the bantha walked, but due to the challenges associated with making this happen, Industrial Light & Magic determined it would be dragged on the ground instead. The costume ultimately weighed about 300 pounds. The bantha's moaning sound was created by sound designer Ben Burtt, who had collected a large number of bear sounds to create the voice of the Wookiee character Chewbacca. Burtt created the bantha's noise by slowing down one a specific bear recording that had been provided to him by documentary producer George Casey.

== Filming and production ==
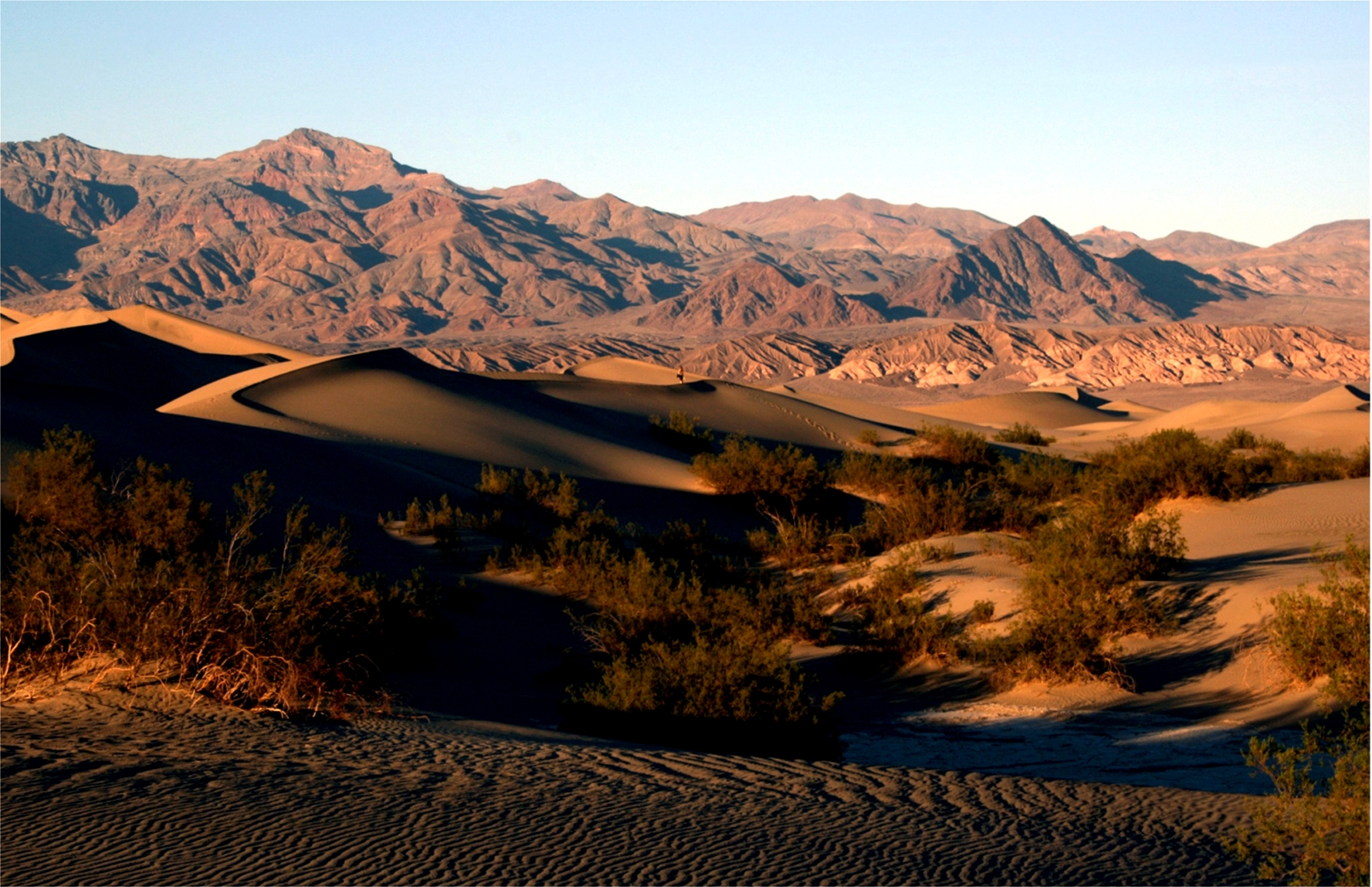
The scenes featuring the bantha in Star Wars (1977) were filmed in the Death Valley National Park in California.

The first bantha to appear onscreen was in the original 1977 Star Wars film. The filmmakers had the option of creating the bantha through stop motion animation or by filming an elephant in a bantha costume, and Lucas decided on the latter because he wanted a Tusken Raider to jump onto the back of the bantha in the scene, which could not be realistically done using stop motion. The bantha appeared in scenes on the desert planet of Tatooine, most of which were filmed in Tunisia. However, the production team had an insufficient budget to transport an elephant to the North African country, and large storms there would have prevented them from doing so even if they could. Lucas thus elected to film the bantha scenes in the United States, with sound to be added later, so that the scenes could be edited into the Tunisia-filmed scenes in post-production. Death Valley National Park in California offered to provide the scenery for the footage, and arrangements were made for an elephant, which was provided by the Marine World Africa USA amusement park in Redwood City, California. The bantha scenes were shot by second unit director Carroll Ballard. The elephant used to portray the bantha was a female Asian elephant named Mardji, who was 22 years old when Star Wars was filmed, and weighed about 8,500 pounds. Her trainer at the time, Bob Spiker, played the Tusken Raider that rode the Bantha in the first movie installment. Mardji had previously been trained to perform tricks, such as water skiing, and she had previously appeared in television commercials for Skippy Peanut Butter.

The bantha scenes were filmed in mid-January 1977, in an area of Death Valley known as Desolation Canyon, which marked the first time Mardji ventured out into the wild. She reportedly enjoyed the experience, playing in a creek during shooting breaks. This bantha costume designed for Mardji proved problematic during filming, as the elephant was unaccustomed to the intense heat of Death Valley and kept shrugging the heavy costume off her body, which slowed production. Crew members were worried the weight of the head mask would cause Mardji problems; special make-up effects artist Rick Baker was particularly concerned. But the elephant experienced more difficulty dragging the costume's tail. Additionally, although Mardji was trained to tuck her trunk into her mouth to conceal it while wearing the bantha costume, her trunk would also occasionally fall out of the costume and become visible during shooting. Mardji's trainer fed her apples as a reward between scenes to help keep her focused and help overcome the challenges from the costume. Lucas said filming with an elephant was more frustrating than using a visual effect because he felt it limited the environment in which he could place the creature. Nevertheless, Mardji was largely good-natured throughout the shoot, and the footage was captured without major incident.

Anthony Daniels, the actor who played C-3PO in the Star Wars films, first saw the bantha footage while recording dialogue during the dubbing process and was so impressed he asked George Lucas how the creature was brought to life, which Lucas did not reveal. During one scene in Star Wars, Luke Skywalker looks through a pair of binoculars and sees two banthas. Only one was used in filming due to budget restraints, and the second bantha in the shot was created using optical compositing. Lucas later said he felt a deep connection with Mardji and "fell in love" with the elephant, regularly visiting her at Marine World after filming. In November 1995, aged 44, Mardji was euthanized at the University of California, Davis because of an untreatable and painful bone condition in her front legs. Mardji had been having difficulty walking due to the ailments, and had undergone two major surgeries for treatment in the years prior to her death. When Lucas revised Star Wars and released a new Special Edition version in 1997, he decided to retain the original shots of the elephant, rather than replacing the bantha with computer-generated imagery. The bantha costume used in Star Wars was on display at Marine World Africa USA for a time after Mardji's death, but elements of it deteriorated because it was not sufficiently protected, and it was later destroyed.

Mardji's gait served as the model for the movement of AT-AT walkers in The Empire Strikes Back (1980). The idea was conceived by special effects artist Jon Berg, who felt the walkers looked so much like elephants that they should mimic their movements as well. During the production of Empire, Berg and fellow special effects artists Phil Tippett and Dennis Muren visited Mardji at Marine World Africa USA and shot footage of her walking back and forth for use as a reference in creating the walker's movements. Each appearance of banthas in films and television after the original Star Wars films were digital creations modeled after the original creature in Star Wars, rather than again using an elephant in costume. The first such use of digitally-created banthas was the shot of a bantha herd in the Special Edition re-release of Return of the Jedi. Rick McCallum, a producer with the Special Edition films, said the digital banthas allowed for greater flexibility and freedom of movement than the original version, which he described as "laboriously-made creatures that you couldn't sync up". An entirely new digital model for the bantha had to be created for its appearance in the animated television series Star Wars: The Clone Wars to match the show's unique visual style.

The bantha inspired the creation of luggabeasts, semi-mechanical beasts of burden used by scavengers in Star Wars: The Force Awakens (2015), the first film of the Star Wars sequel trilogy. Concept designer Christian Alzmann said the crew sought to make updated versions of the creatures from the original films, and banthas from the original Star Wars film helped inspire this approach. Additionally, the use of a live elephant for the original bantha inspired the special effects team behind Solo: A Star Wars Story (2018) to use actual dogs to portray Corellian hounds, quadrupedal creatures featured in that film. Special effects artist Neal Scanlan said the bantha in Star Wars "set that whole thing up for me. It's our responsibility to carry that magic forward."

== Critical reception ==
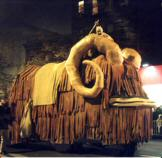
A bantha puppet at New York's Village Halloween Parade

The bantha has been described as a favorite among fans, as well as the cast and crew of the films. Anthony Daniels, the actor who portrayed C-3PO, called the bantha "one of the best things in the movie". Ted Edwards, author of The Unauthorized Star Wars Compendium, wrote that the shot of a herd of banthas added in to the Special Edition version of Return of the Jedi was "probably the single most striking image added to any of the three films". Gary Arnold, senior film critic with The Washington Times, said he appreciated that the bantha was not replaced by a digital creation in Star Wars re-releases like other creatures were, and that it represented an authenticity that fans appreciate. The bantha was included on HowStuffWorks' list of "11 Wacky Star Wars Creatures We Love", calling it "a wacky combination of animal parts in a memorable form". Brian Linder of IGN praised banthas as a positive addition to the Star Wars universe, writing: "Banthas are the choice beast of burden of the Tusken frickin' Raiders. That alone makes them cool."

== Cultural references ==
The first name of the original newsletter of the Official Star Wars Fan Club was Bantha Tracks, inspired by the creature. Originally entitled simply Official Star Wars Fan Club when first published in 1978, the newsletter was renamed after a contest in the second issue invited readers to submit new names. Preston Postole of Avon, Ohio, submitted the winning title of Bantha Tracks. During one scene in Return of the Jedi, Jabba the Hutt insults Han Solo by saying: "You may have been a good smuggler, but now you're bantha fodder." The line became a popular one among Star Wars fans, with "bantha fodder" becoming a well-known Star Wars-related insult. An Australian punk band called Bantha Fodder takes its name from the line. In Phineas and Ferb: Star Wars, a 2014 Star Wars-themed episode of the animated series Phineas and Ferb, villain character Dr. Heinz Doofenshmirtz sings a song that ends with the line "Darth Vader can kiss my bantha!" A September 18, 2014 episode of the educational children's television series Sesame Street featured a Star Wars-inspired segment in which Mr. Snuffleupagus, a woolly mammoth-like Muppet character, appeared as a bantha.

== Merchandise ==
A bantha action figure was planned for the Star Wars: The Power of the Force toy line by Kenner Products in 1985, and concept artwork was prepared for the toy, but it was never produced before Kenner ended the toy line. A bantha figure would not be created until Hasbro revived the Power of the Force line in 1995. Several miniature bantha figures have since been released for use in Star Wars role-playing games, including one by West End Games, and a five-inch figurine through the Star Wars Miniatures toyline by Wizards of the Coast. Original t-shirts for official members of the Star Wars fan club featured a photo of a bantha. In 2014, Hallmark released a miniature bantha plush toys through its Itty Bittys toy line, sold in a two-pack along with a Tusken Raider. A bantha ride had been planned for Star Wars Galaxy's Edge at Disneyland, but it was ultimately not created. The planned attraction would have allowed visitors to ride on platforms atop large animatronic banthas, which would then embark on a tour of the area.

== Bibliography ==
- Cavelos, Jeanne (2000). The Science of Star Wars: An Astrophysicist's Independent Examination of Space Travel, Aliens, Planets, and Robots as Portrayed in the Star Wars Films and Books. St. Martin's Griffin. ISBN 9780312263874.
- Edwards, Ted (1999). The Unauthorized Star Wars Compendium: The Complete Guide to the Movies, Comic Books, Novels, and More. Little, Brown and Company. ISBN 0316329290.
- Slavicsek, Bill; Greenberg, Daniel; Kaufman, Doug (1988). The Star Wars Sourcebook. West End Games. ISBN 0874310695.
- Kent, Paul (October 27, 2015). The Real Force: A 40 Day Devotional. Worthy Inspired. ISBN 978-1617955815.
- Lewis, Ann Margaret (April 3, 2001). The Essential Guide to Alien Species. Del Rey Books. ISBN 0345442202.
- Pollock, Dale (1999). Skywalking: The Life and Films of George Lucas. Harmony Books. ISBN 0573606064.
- Rinzler, J.W. (2007). The Making of Star Wars: The Definitive Story Behind the Original Film. Del Rey Books. ISBN 9780345494764.
- Sansweet, Stephen J.; Hidalgo, Pablo (December 9, 2008a). The Complete Star Wars Encyclopedia, A–G Volume I. New York City: Del Rey Books. ISBN 978-0-345-47763-7.
- Sansweet, Stephen J.; Hidalgo, Pablo (December 9, 2008c). The Complete Star Wars Encyclopedia, P–Z Volume III. New York City: Del Rey Books. ISBN 978-0-345-47763-7.
- Slavicsek, Bill; Smith, Curtis (October 1, 1987). The Star Wars Sourcebook. West End Games. ISBN 0874310660.
- Szostak, Phil (December 18, 2015). The Art of Star Wars: The Force Awakens. Abrams Books. ISBN 9781419717802.
- Szostak, Phil (May 25, 2018). The Art of Solo: A Star Wars Story. Abrams Books. ISBN 9781419727450.
- White, Dana (1999). George Lucas. Twenty-First Century Books. ISBN 0822549751.
- Whitlatch, Terryl; Carrau, Bob (2001). The Wildlife of Star Wars. Chronicle Books. ISBN 0811828697.
- Wixted, Martin (1993). Galaxy Guide 7: Mos Eisley. West End Games. ISBN 087431187X.
- Great Science Fiction Film Stories. Octopus Books. 1984. ISBN 978-0-7440-1125-8.
