= Shoot First =

Shoot First may refer to:

- Shoot first law, or stand-your-ground law, a legal doctrine on justifiable use of force in self-defense
- Rough Shoot, also known as Shoot First, 1953 British film
- Shoot First, Die Later, 1974 Italian film
- Shoot First... Ask Questions Later, or The White, the Yellow, and the Black, 1975 Italian film
- Harry Benson: Shoot First, a 2016 documentary
- Han shot first, controversial change made to a scene in Star Wars Episode IV: A New Hope
