= Harmy's Despecialized Edition =

2011 fan-created film preservation of the original Star Wars trilogy films

Blu-ray cover

Star Wars: The Despecialized Edition, also known as Harmy's Despecialized Edition, is a fan-created film preservation of the original Star Wars trilogy films: Star Wars (1977), The Empire Strikes Back (1980), and Return of the Jedi (1983). It is a high-quality replica of the out-of-print theatrical versions, created by a team of Star Wars fans with the intention of preserving the films, culturally and historically. The project was led by Petr Harmáček, then an English teacher, from Plzeň, Czech Republic, under the online alias Harmy.

The original Star Wars trilogy was created by George Lucas and released theatrically between 1977 and 1983. For the franchise's 20th anniversary in 1997, Lucas introduced noticeable changes within the films to address his dissatisfaction with the original cuts. These versions, promoted as the "Special Edition", included additional scenes, different dialogue, new sound effects, and computer-generated imagery. These changes, along with more changes added in 2004, 2011, and 2019 were carried over into subsequent home video releases. As of 2026, the original theatrical releases are not commercially available, and have never been officially released in high definition.

The new changes were met with a negative response from critics and fans. Harmáček felt that changing the films in this way constituted "an act of cultural vandalism". In 2010, he began to create a high-definition reconstruction of the films' theatrical versions. He and a team of eight other fans used the 2011 Blu-ray releases for the majority of material, the lower-definition 1993 LaserDisc releases as a guide to the original version, and various other sources. The first version was published online in 2011, and updated versions have been released since.

As a derivative work, Harmy's Despecialized Edition cannot be legally bought or sold in the United States and other countries with treaties respecting US copyrights, and is "to be shared among legal owners of the officially available releases only". Consequently, the films are mainly available via various file sharing methods. Reaction to the project has been mostly positive, with critics generally praising the quality and aesthetics of the work.

== Background ==
Star Wars logo

The original Star Wars trilogy was a Lucasfilm production released theatrically by 20th Century Fox between 1977 and 1983, and was subsequently released on home media during the 1980s and 1990s. The films were distributed by CBS/Fox Video on several formats, such as VHS, Betamax, and LaserDisc. In 1997, to coincide with the 20th anniversary of Star Wars, Lucas re-released new cuts of the trilogy to theaters, naming them the "Special Editions". The purpose of this release was to change the films to meet Lucas' ideal vision that he could not achieve during their original productions. A number of changes to the original releases included additions of enhanced digital effects, previously unreleased scenes, altered dialogue, unreleased and newly recorded music by John Williams, updated sound-effects by THX and Skywalker Sound, and entirely new CGI sequences from Industrial Light & Magic.

Reactions to the "Special Edition" versions remain controversial, with some commentators praising the picture and sound restoration, but criticising unnecessary additions such as computer-generated characters, creatures, and vehicles as well as alterations to the essential story; most notably, a short scene involving the bounty hunter Greedo shooting at Han Solo from the first film drew significant ire. Further changes to the series were added to the DVD release in 2004 to establish continuity with the prequel trilogy and to the Blu-ray releases from 2011. The final release of the theatrical cuts was in 2006, when unrestored masters used for the 1993 "Definitive Collection" trilogy on LaserDisc were added as a DVD bonus feature to a limited run – some fans pejoratively termed this release "George's Original Unaltered Trilogy" (GOUT).

Despite a high demand and many online fan petitions, Lucasfilm has refused to release the theatrical versions of Star Wars in HD quality. In 2010, Lucas stated that bringing the original cuts to Blu-ray would be a "very, very expensive" process; as of 2026, the films are still only widely available in their altered versions.

== Production ==
=== Conception ===
Petr Harmáček (known online by the alias "Harmy") had watched a dubbed version of the original cut of Star Wars at the age of six, and had then seen the Special Editions of The Empire Strikes Back and Return of the Jedi on their 1997 release. Although initially admiring them, he became disappointed when he learned how much the films had been changed retroactively; he argued that replacing the original effects with re-composited digital effects was "an act of cultural vandalism". A fan of the original trilogy, he had written his undergraduate thesis on their cultural impact. After seeing a trailer for a cut of the DVD version of The Empire Strikes Back by a fan known as Adywan, Harmáček was inspired to create a version of the film that "undid" the various post-1977 changes and restored the theatrical releases, in high-definition. He described his motivation as: "I wanted to be able to show people who haven't seen Star Wars yet, like my little brother or my girlfriend, the original, Oscar-winning version, but I didn't want to have to show it to them in bad quality." Harmáček's edits were the first to recreate the theatrical releases in HD.

=== Editing ===
Look at this awesome film that was made in the '70s ... I want to show that to people. I wanted to show my brother. He was three when I started working and I showed it to him when he was five and he loved it.

— Petr "Harmy" Harmáček explaining his motivation for creating the Despecialized Edition

Harmáček began creating his new cuts in 2010. At the time, he was working as an English teacher in Plzeň and had no professional experience with film editing. Instead, he taught himself programs such as Avisynth and Adobe After Effects as the project progressed, beginning with Photoshop skills that he had developed in college. To remove the post-1977 changes, Harmáček went through the film frame-by-frame, correcting colors and rotoscoping. Undoing some shots took only an hour, while others took hundreds. Lightsabers were color-corrected, shots of the Millennium Falcon cockpit were un-cropped, Boba Fett's original voice was restored, and CGI characters and backgrounds were removed.

=== Sources ===
Most of the source material used for Harmy's Despecialized Edition was taken from Lucasfilm's official Blu-ray release of the films in 2011, while other sequences were upscaled from previous home video releases.

These include:

- The 2-disc "Limited Edition" DVD release from 2006. This set contains a low resolution copy of the theatrical cuts on a bonus disc. Harmy refers to this disc as "George's Original Unaltered Trilogy" (GOUT).
- The official trilogy on DVD box set from 2004, primarily the HDTV broadcasts of those versions of the films.
- The 1997 "Special Edition" re-releases, most notably digital broadcasts of those cuts along with their LaserDisc releases.
- The 1993 LaserDisc "Definitive Collection" box set.
- Digital transfers of a Spanish 35 mm Kodak LPP and 70 mm film cels, a 16 mm print.
- A collection of still images of the original matte paintings.

Harmáček edited these sources together using programs such as Avisynth and Adobe After Effects.

Harmáček was assisted by a group of like-minded fans from the website OriginalTrilogy.com. In total, they estimated that the project took thousands of hours of work between them. In 2011, one year after the project had begun, the first version of Harmy's Despecialized Edition was published online; new and updated versions were created regularly in the five years that followed. As of February 2026, the most recent versions of Star Wars, The Empire Strikes Back and Return of the Jedi are v2.7, v2.0 and v3.1 respectively. As a result of the project, Harmáček was able to quit his teaching job and in 2015 was hired by UltraFlix to prepare and restore a library of 4K-encoded films for sale and rent. He has since joined UPP, a Prague-based VFX house, as a 2D digital compositor and worked on such projects as Blade Runner 2049, Wonder Woman, and AMC's The Terror.

=== Legality ===
The legality of downloading Harmy's Despecialized Edition is contentious. As a fan edit, the cut cannot be legally bought or sold, and treads a line between fair use and copyright infringement. OriginalTrilogy.com states that the edits are "made for culturally historical and educational purposes" and that they are "to be shared among legal owners of the officially available releases only". Consequently, the films are only available via various BitTorrent trackers and through specialized rapid download programs using file sharing sites. Harmáček himself remarked: "I'm convinced that 99% of people who download this already bought Star Wars 10 times over on DVD."

== Translated versions ==
In 2013, Italian blogger "Leo", from the blog DoppiaggiItalioti.it – which discusses Italian adaptations of foreign films, both satirizing dubbing and translation errors and endorsing good dubs – worked on an Italian-language version of Harmy's Despecialized Edition for the original Star Wars movie, together with other people, and with Harmáček's permission. He used original 35mm prints of the localized Italian-language edition, as well as a rare 1991 VHS copy, to reproduce the opening crawl, subtitles, and end credits (even preserving some typos) of the film, as they were seen in Italian theaters. This version is no longer available, since it is based on an outdated version of Harmáček's work, although an update to the blog post assures that when a "definitive" edition is released, the localization will be adapted to that one. The update also refers to another "multilanguage" version of the Despecialized Edition, featuring several audio tracks – the Italian one is taken from the Italian version of the 2006 limited edition DVD – over the original English-language video.

The project also restored the original Italian trailer for the film, which Leo produced using the video from the original US trailer and audio from low-definition copies, as well as completely remaking the text sections.

== Team Negative 1, Project 4K77, and subsequent restorations ==
Although Harmy's Despecialized Editions have been widely praised, some have remarked that they are still technically reconstructions using digital effects and upscaling of low quality sources, rather than truly unaltered preservations. This led to subsequent attempts at improvement, such as the Silver Screen Edition and Skywalker Edition.

One of these efforts, Project 4K77, is a fan project to scan and restore original 35mm prints of Star Wars from 1977. The project name refers to the 4K resolution used and the film's release year of 1977. In 2016, a few 35mm prints were located and donated to a group of fans called "Team Negative 1" (TN1), who scanned these prints at 4K resolution. TN1 released the film online in May 2018, 97% of the restored video came from a single, original 1977 35mm Technicolor release print that was dubbed in Spanish, with the remainder from a handful of alternate prints and some frames (about 17 seconds worth) upscaled from the official Lucasfilm Blu-ray.

TN1 followed 4K77 with Project 4K83, based on an original 35mm print of Return of the Jedi (released in 1983) that was discovered and scanned in 4K. According to their website, this print required little cleanup, and the restoration was released in October 2018. TN1 released a subsequent improved V2.0 of this restoration in 2023, which contains more "theatrically accurate" colors due to a technical error when encoding the original release.

Project 4K80, a restoration of The Empire Strikes Back (1980), was begun by TN1 in 2020, reporting that although they have multiple prints, some were faded and they required substantially more cleanup, with a projected two-year time frame to complete. It was released in February 2024.

== Reception ==
Reaction to Harmy's Despecialized Edition has been almost universally positive. Writing for Inverse, Sean Hutchinson placed it at number one on his list of the best Star Wars fan edits, and described it as "the perfect pre-1997 way to experience the saga." Whitson Gordon of Lifehacker called the edits "the best version of Star Wars you can watch," and named them "the version of Star Wars we've all been clamoring for the last 20 years". Similarly, Nathan Barry of Wired praised the films as "an absolute joy to watch", while Gizmodo described them as "very, very good". In an article listing Ars Technica's favorite Star Wars items, Sam Machkovech selected Harmy's Despecialized Edition, calling it "a treat."
