= Sandcrawler =

Type of vehicle in the Star Wars universe

A sandcrawler as seen in Star Wars

The sandcrawler is a fictional transport vehicle in the Star Wars universe that is found on the desert planet Tatooine. The vehicle, as it appears in its major appearances in Star Wars Episode IV: A New Hope, is 37 metres (121 ft) long and 18 metres (59 ft) tall. Only a 27-metre (89 ft) length of its lower hull was constructed as a set for the film. Other appearances were simulated with matte paintings and a remote-controlled model.

== Origin and design ==
The design of the sandcrawler was first inspired by photographs of a NASA-designed rover created to explore alien planets. It was conceived as large, old, very rusty, and having treads. The front of the vehicle was envisioned to have a mouth-like scoop that lowered with hydraulics to pick up things, like a garbage truck. While its original design was streamlined, it was modified to be taller and more awkward-looking. The final design was created on April 5, 1975.

== Production ==
The prefabricated movie set of the sandcrawler was shipped from England and took special effects expert John Stears and his crew four days to move it 50 kilometres (30 miles) into the Tunisian desert. It was two stories tall and 27 metres (90 ft) long when it was fully assembled, with the caterpillar tracks being almost twice as tall as a person, and covered in sand and mud to give them a "used" look. The night before the scene with the Jawas was to be shot, a sandstorm blew apart the set, and it took a day to put it back together and an additional day to shoot the scene. Afterwards, it was transformed into a burned-out hulk, taking another day.

The construction of the sandcrawler piqued the interest of the Algerian government, who sent inspectors across the border to make sure it was not an actual military vehicle of some kind.

== Depiction ==
Most sandcrawlers are homes to Jawas. They were originally constructed in Corellia for the purpose of serving as ore haulers during mining operations, and many were brought to Tatooine when it was first settled as a mining colony. When the mining industry collapsed they were abandoned and the native Jawa took them over. The number of sandcrawlers is unknown on Tatooine because most Jawa clans only meet during the annual "swap meets" when Jawa clans meet to trade with each other. Jawa clans usually worship the Sandcrawler they have inhabited for generations. The Sandcrawler is powered by eight massive turbines to power the treads which pull it over the dunes of the desert. Since repairs are not done thoroughly, sandcrawlers are liable to fail at any time. Within the Sandcrawler are a maze of tunnels, living quarters and rooms which keep spare parts, machinery and captured droids. The front of the Sandcrawler opens to form a large ramp though there are also hatches between the giant treads that provide access to and from the crawler. They are powerful enough to withstand Tusken Raiders but are no match for Imperial Stormtroopers.

The Sandcrawler first appeared in the 1977 film Star Wars Episode IV: A New Hope, where R2-D2 and C-3PO were transported across the desert terrain of Tatooine. They make a cameo appearance in Star Wars: Episode I – The Phantom Menace in the establishing shot for the podrace, and also appeared in the Star Wars Episode II: Attack of the Clones when Anakin Skywalker asks a Jawa leader for directions to a Tusken Raider camp. One also appeared in the post credits of a documentary on The Phantom Menace DVD. It was shown during the podrace, moving faster than and overtaking Sebulba's podracer. A Sandcrawler and Jawas are also seen in the final sequence of Star Wars: The Rise of Skywalker when Rey arrives on Tatooine. Sandcrawlers, or early predecessors, have made appearances in many Star Wars video games, such as Star Wars: Knights of the Old Republic (used by the Czerka Corporation), and Star Wars Jedi Knight: Jedi Academy. A digital pinball table based on Star Wars droids has a cabinet that moves and is shaped like a sandcrawler.

The vehicle appears in the Disney+ series The Mandalorian, in a scene where the titular character pursues a sandcrawler carrying the scavenged parts from his ship.

== Cultural references ==
A 43-centimetre (17 in), radio-controlled toy Sandcrawler was released in 1979 as part of the original Kenner Star Wars toy line; a recolored version with a more "authentic" painted surface was issued in 2004. In 2005, Lego came out with a detailed model.

Lucasfilm's Singapore base is shaped and named after the Sandcrawler.
