= Separation masters =

Long-term preservation for modern color motion picture film

Separation masters are a method of long-term preservation for most modern color motion picture film. Since monopack color film - (where materials for registering all the colors of the spectrum are contained on one film - its opposite is bipack colour film where two films face each other and the lower spectrum reds and yellows are on one film and the higher spectrum greens and blues are on another film - see Technicolor three strip) used in such processes as ECN, ECP and their successive revisions - contains photographically active color couplers which remain in the film after development, the emulsion will continue to produce chemical reactions in the image which cumulatively create a color fading, usually heavily biased towards the pink spectrum. In order to protect against this occurrence, the technique of separation masters was created.

Separation mastering is essentially an inversion of the Technicolor three-strip system, which used filtration to create three black and white masters each sensitized for one of the RGB colours and then printed the negatives with a CMYK colorspace. In separation mastering, the original camera negative is used to create three black and white copies, each one filtered for one of the RGB colours. The black and white process is considered inert after development and thus should be more stable for long-term archival, preservation, and restoration (although the film base may eventually decay regardless).
