= Han shot first =

Controversy about a scene of Star Wars

This slow-motion clip shows the 2004 version of the scene, in which Solo and Greedo fire at nearly the same time.

"Han shot first" refers to a controversial change made to a scene in the film Star Wars (1977), (Note: Later titled Star Wars: Episode IV – A New Hope) in which Han Solo is confronted by the bounty hunter Greedo in the Mos Eisley cantina. In the original version of this scene, Han shoots Greedo dead. Later versions are edited so that Greedo fires at Han first. Director George Lucas altered the scene to give Solo more justification for acting in self-defense. Many fans and commentators oppose the change, feeling it weakens Solo's characterization. The controversy is referenced in the 2018 film Solo: A Star Wars Story.

== Scene ==
The smuggler Han Solo (Harrison Ford) is cornered by the bounty hunter Greedo (Paul Blake/Maria De Aragon) in a cantina and moves to sit down while at gunpoint. While they talk about money Solo owes, Solo readies his gun under the table. Greedo tells him he has been "looking forward" to killing Solo for a long time. Solo replies, "Yes, I'll bet you have."

The conclusion varies depending on the version of the film being watched. In the original version, the film cuts to a shot of Greedo, followed quickly by flashes of sparks, a cloud of smoke, and the sound of a blaster firing. This is followed by a shot of Greedo from behind, slumping over the table. Greedo never shoots at Solo. However, in the 1997 Special Edition, Greedo shoots first at Solo and misses due to Solo moving his head, and Solo then returns fire, killing Greedo.

For the 2004 DVD release, the shots are fired at nearly the same time and Solo dodges Greedo's shot. For the 2011 Blu-ray release, the scene of Solo and Greedo firing at each other was shortened by several frames. The scene was changed again for the version of the film released on Disney+ on November 12, 2019. In this version, using a close-up shot already used a few seconds before, Greedo says a line transcribed by fans as "maclunkey!” ("This'll be the end of you") before shooting at Han. The line may be a threat spoken in Huttese, as it is used that way by Sebulba in The Phantom Menace. Additionally, the reverse shot of Greedo being shot was removed, and new effects were used. The changes were made by Lucas before Disney acquired the franchise in 2012.

According to Paul Blake, the scene was created as a result of Lucas having to cut a special effects-heavy scene introducing Jabba the Hutt due to budget and schedule concerns. The original version of the Greedo scene has grown to be considered iconic, while the Jabba scene, which was restored for the Special Edition and later releases, is generally regarded as superfluous. The original special effect was designed and carried out by British two-time Academy Award winning 'Dean of Special Effects' John Stears, who mounted the pyrotechnics to the Greedo character.

== Criticism ==
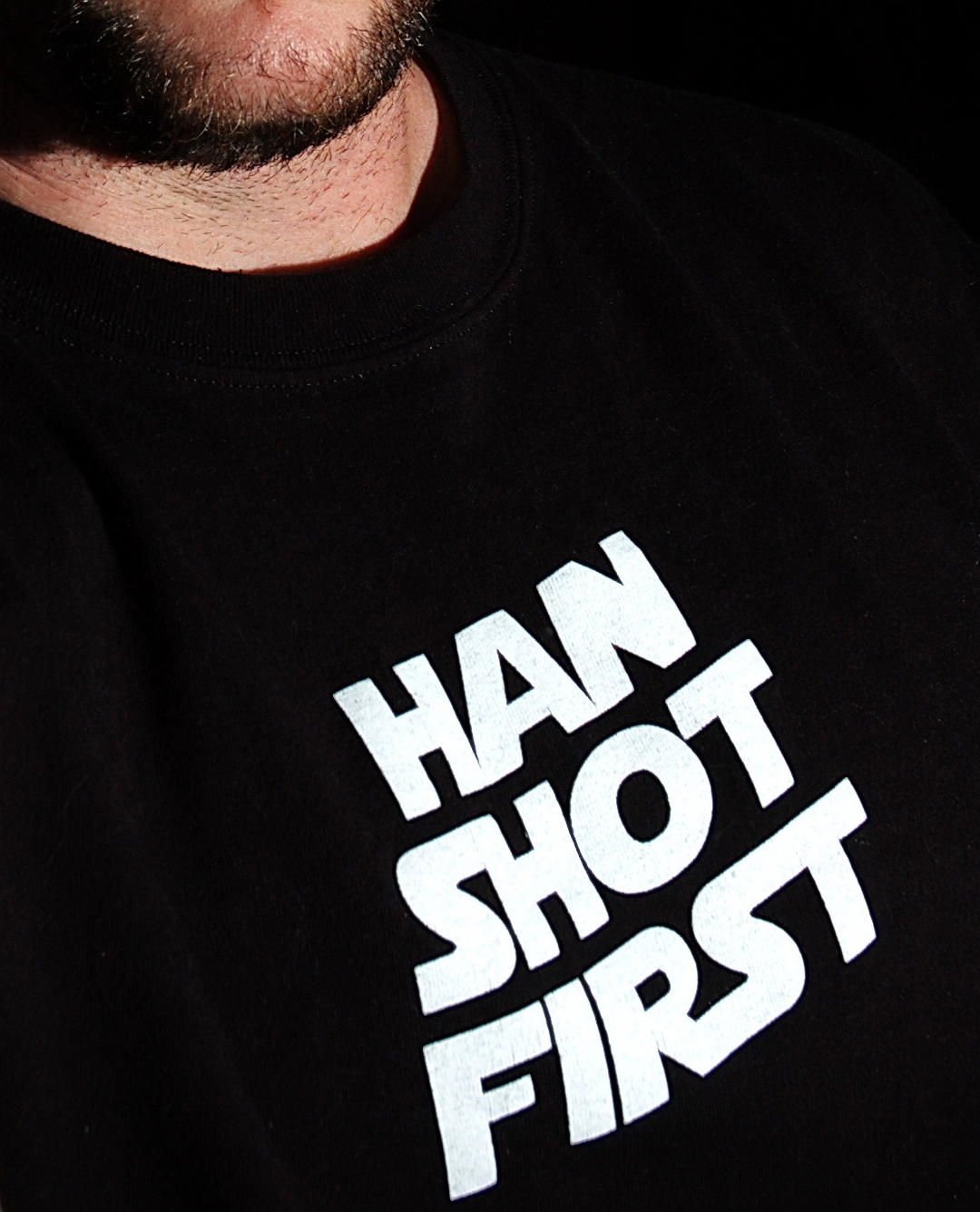
T-shirt with the quote "Han shot first"

The change is one of the most controversial of many alterations made in the 1997 Special Edition of Star Wars. Many fans argued that it alters Han's initially morally ambiguous character, making his later transition from antihero to hero less meaningful. According to Variety, "Fans lost their minds. It was an affront, the neutering of a badass." Fans have created fan edits of the original Star Wars films (such as Harmy's Despecialized Edition) to reverse Lucas' changes, especially the scene with Solo and Greedo. In a 2004 interview, Lucas responded to the criticism, saying, "To me, [the original movie] doesn't really exist anymore. ... I'm sorry you saw half a completed film and fell in love with it. But I want it to be the way I want it to be." He acknowledged the controversy by wearing a "Han shot first" T-shirt on the sets of Star Wars: Episode III – Revenge of the Sith (2005) and Indiana Jones and the Kingdom of the Crystal Skull (2008). In a 2012 interview with The Hollywood Reporter, Lucas said:

The controversy over who shot first, Greedo or Han Solo, in Episode IV, what I did was try to clean up the confusion, but obviously it upset people because they wanted Solo to be a cold-blooded killer, but he actually isn't. It had been done in all close-ups and it was confusing about who did what to whom. I put a little wider shot in there that made it clear that Greedo is the one who shot first, but everyone wanted to think that Han shot first, because they wanted to think that he actually just gunned him down.

One draft of the original script makes no mention of Greedo shooting at all, only Solo. In 2015, a replica of an early script for Star Wars was discovered in the archives of the University of New Brunswick library. In the script, dated March 15, 1976, Han shoots first. In a 2015 interview, Lucas said:

Han Solo was going to marry Leia, and you look back and say, "Should he be a cold-blooded killer?" Because I was thinking mythologically—should he be a cowboy, should he be John Wayne? And I said, "Yeah, he should be John Wayne." And when you're John Wayne, you don't shoot people [first]—you let them have the first shot. (Note: In Red River, John Wayne's character, Thomas Dunson, shoots and kills a Mexican whose boss Dunson admits he is stealing land from. The Mexican begins to draw just before Dunson, who then says he predicted his opponent's move "By watchin' his eyes.") It's a mythological reality that we hope our society pays attention to.

In 2020's The Star Wars Archives: 1999–2005, Lucas commented, "I never designed Han to be a ruthless killer. All the good guys shoot in self-defense. When I edited the scene in 1977 you couldn't tell who does what."

Paul Blake said in a 2016 interview: "Of course, it said it all in the original script, we played in the scene in English and at the end of the scene, it reads, 'Han shoots the alien.' It's all it says and that's what happened. It was very painful." Blake felt that Greedo shooting at and missing Solo at very short range made him appear inept, and that Greedo has more glory if he is "just blown away". In 2015, legal expert John P. Gross argued that Greedo's behavior constituted a direct threat and would warrant preemptive action in self-defense under U.S. law. In 2014, when asked in a Reddit AMA, Harrison Ford replied, "I don't know and I don't care." On the 2019 addition of a new line of dialogue, Blake said:

I couldn't understand a word of it. (laughs) It confused me incredibly, but I've never understood anything about the movies anyway, particularly that. The convention I've just come back from, I had a million opinions from everybody. This new word!

== Legacy ==
In the 2018 film Solo: A Star Wars Story, Han Solo shoots antagonist Tobias Beckett mid-sentence, killing him. Writers Lawrence and Jonathan Kasdan confirmed that this was a deliberate reference, and that the Solo shooting script specifies: "There can be no question that Han shoots first."

In The Lego Star Wars Holiday Special (2020), which features characters from different time periods brought together through time travel, an older Han from The Force Awakens asks the younger Han from A New Hope if he wants to shoot first during an encounter with Greedo. He replies, "After you." Both men open fire simultaneously, before Greedo can react.
