= Star Wars original trilogy =

First three films in the media franchise

Star Wars Trilogy
- The original Star Wars trilogy logos
- Directed by: George Lucas (IV); Irvin Kershner (V); Richard Marquand (VI)
- Screenplay by: George Lucas (IV, VI); Lawrence Kasdan (V–VI); Leigh Brackett (V)
- Story by: George Lucas
- Produced by: Gary Kurtz (IV–V); Howard Kazanjian (VI)
- Starring: Mark Hamill; Harrison Ford; Carrie Fisher; Peter Cushing (IV); Alec Guinness; Billy Dee Williams (V–VI); Anthony Daniels; David Prowse; James Earl Jones; Kenny Baker; Peter Mayhew; Frank Oz (V–VI); Ian McDiarmid (VI)
- Cinematography: Gilbert Taylor (IV); Peter Suschitzky (V); Alan Hume (VI)
- Edited by: Marcia Lucas (IV, VI); Paul Hirsch (IV–V); Richard Chew (IV); Sean Barton (VI); Duwayne Dunham (VI)
- Music by: John Williams
- Production company: Lucasfilm Ltd.
- Distributed by: 1977–2019: 20th Century Fox since 2019: Walt Disney Studios Motion Pictures (Note: According to the 2012 deal, physical distribution rights to Episodes V–VI were set to move to Disney in 2020, while rights to Episode IV were set to stay with Fox, but eventually rights for the trilogy moved to Disney in 2019 as a result of the acquisition of Fox. Theatrical re-releases are still distributed under the 20th Century Studios label.)
- Release date: 1977–1983
- Country: United States
- Language: English
- Budget: $76.5 million (total for IV–VI)
- Box office: $1.798 billion (total for IV–VI)

The original Star Wars trilogy, formerly marketed as the Star Wars Trilogy (and colloquially referred to as the 'original trilogy' or classic trilogy), is the first set of three films produced in the Star Wars franchise, an American space opera created by George Lucas. It was produced by Lucasfilm and distributed by 20th Century Fox, and consists of Star Wars (1977), (Note: Later titled Star Wars: Episode IV – A New Hope) The Empire Strikes Back (1980) and Return of the Jedi (1983). Beginning in medias res, the original trilogy serves as the second act of the nine-episode Skywalker Saga. It was followed by a prequel trilogy between 1999 and 2005, and a sequel trilogy between 2015 and 2019. Collectively, they are referred to as the "Skywalker Saga" to distinguish them from spin-off films set within the same fictional universe.

The films center on the Galactic Civil War between the Rebel Alliance and the tyrannical Galactic Empire, as well as the archetypical hero's journey of Luke Skywalker in his quest to become a Jedi under the tutelage of exiled Jedi Masters Obi-Wan Kenobi and Yoda. Luke joins forces with Princess Leia, Han Solo, Chewbacca, C-3PO, R2-D2 and the Rebel Alliance in facing the Empire and the evil Sith Lord Darth Vader.

The original Star Wars film received widespread acclaim from critics for its storytelling, characters, John Williams' musical score and its groundbreaking visual and sound effects. The film surpassed 1975's Jaws as the highest grossing film of all time, turning science fiction films into a blockbuster genre, until it was surpassed by E.T. the Extra-Terrestrial in 1982. Star Wars and The Empire Strikes Back have been hailed as among the greatest and most important films of all time. Since the original trilogy's release and success, Star Wars has become a pop culture phenomenon, spawning a multimedia franchise, consisting of numerous television series, video games, books, and theme park attractions, complete with a multi-million dollar merchandising empire. All three films have been inducted by the Library of Congress for preservation in the United States National Film Registry for being "culturally, historically, or aesthetically significant".

== Background ==
In 1971, Lucas wanted to film an adaptation of the Flash Gordon serial, but could not obtain the rights. He began developing his own story inspired by the work of Edgar Rice Burroughs. (Note: Flash Gordon creator Alex Raymond had been influenced by John Carter of Mars in particular.) Immediately after directing American Graffiti (1973), Lucas wrote a two-page synopsis for his space opera, titled Journal of the Whills. After United Artists, Universal Studios and Disney rejected the film, 20th Century Fox decided to invest in it. Lucas felt his original story was too difficult to understand, so on April 17, 1973, he began writing a 13-page script titled The Star Wars, sharing strong similarities with Akira Kurosawa's The Hidden Fortress (1958). By May 1974, he had expanded the script into the first draft of a screenplay, adding elements such as the Sith and the Death Star, but found that the script had grown too long for a single film. Subsequent drafts evolved into the script of the original film.

Lucas negotiated to retain the sequel rights. Tom Pollock, then Lucas's lawyer, writes: "We came to an agreement that George would retain the sequel rights. Not all the [merchandising rights] that came later, mind you; just the sequel rights. And Fox would get a first opportunity and last refusal right to make the movie." Lucas was offered $50,000 to write, another $50,000 to produce, and $50,000 to direct the film; his directing compensation was later increased to $100,000. He also negotiated the sequel rights and ownership of 40% of the merchandising profits. American Graffiti cast member Harrison Ford had given up on acting to try to become a carpenter, until Lucas hired him to play Han Solo.

During the development of the trilogy after the initial conception of the first film, Lucas took inspiration from Marvel Comics and the characters from the Marvel Universe who were popular in the 1970s to come up with many plot points and ideas for various designs.

== Casting ==
Thousands of actors were assessed in the search for the trilogy's main cast. The selected actors are considered by many viewers to have onscreen chemistry even though some of them were inexperienced, with the notable exceptions of Alec Guinness and Peter Cushing. Some, like Ford, have called the dialogue in the scripts clunky, and several lines were unscripted; some of these are considered the most memorable moments in the films. (Note: Ford's lines "We're fine. We're all fine here, now, thank you. How are you?" in A New Hope and "I know" in The Empire Strikes Back were improvised, and Mark Hamill (Luke Skywalker) was not aware he was being filmed when he said "I can't see a thing in this helmet" during the filming of A New Hope.)

== Films ==
Star Wars was released on May 25, 1977; unlikely hero Luke Skywalker is drawn into a galactic conflict between the Empire and Rebel Alliance by two droids and an old Jedi Knight; he helps make one of the Rebellion's most significant victories. The film's unanticipated success led Lucas to make it the basis of an elaborate serial. With the backstory he created for the sequel, Lucas decided that the series would be a trilogy of trilogies, with the original film given the subtitle Episode IV – A New Hope to establish it as the first part of the second trilogy. The first sequel, Episode V – The Empire Strikes Back, was released on May 21, 1980, and sees Luke begin training as a Jedi under the last living Jedi master, Yoda. Luke confronts Sith Lord Darth Vader, who is revealed to be Luke's father. Vader attempts to convert Luke to the dark side of the Force. The third film, Episode VI – Return of the Jedi, was released on May 25, 1983, and follows Luke as a full-fledged Jedi. Luke succeeds in redeeming Vader, thereby saving the galaxy from the Empire. The sequels were self-financed by Lucasfilm, and were generally advertised without the episodic number distinction present in their opening crawls.

Film	Release date	Director	Screenwriter(s)	Story by	Producer(s)	Distributor
Star Wars (Note: Also known as Star Wars: A New Hope or Star Wars: Episode IV – A New Hope.)	May 25, 1977	George Lucas	George Lucas	George Lucas	Gary Kurtz	20th Century Fox (initial); Walt Disney Studios Motion Pictures
The Empire Strikes Back (Note: Also known as Star Wars: Episode V – The Empire Strikes Back.)	May 21, 1980	Irvin Kershner	Leigh Brackett and Lawrence Kasdan	George Lucas	Gary Kurtz	20th Century Fox (initial); Walt Disney Studios Motion Pictures
Return of the Jedi (Note: Also known as Star Wars: Episode VI – Return of the Jedi.)	May 25, 1983	Richard Marquand	Lawrence Kasdan and George Lucas	George Lucas	Howard Kazanjian	20th Century Fox (initial); Walt Disney Studios Motion Pictures

=== A New Hope ===
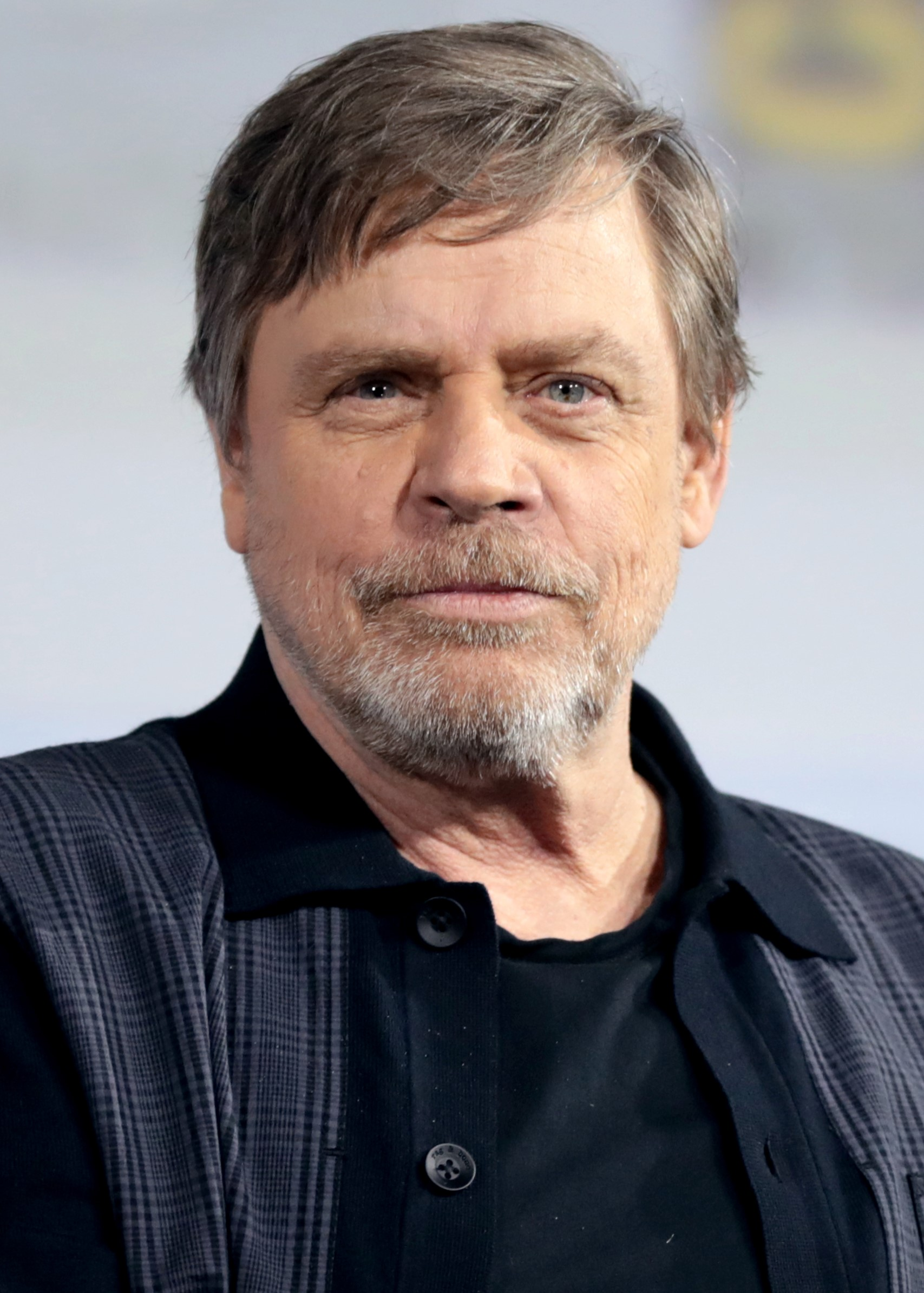
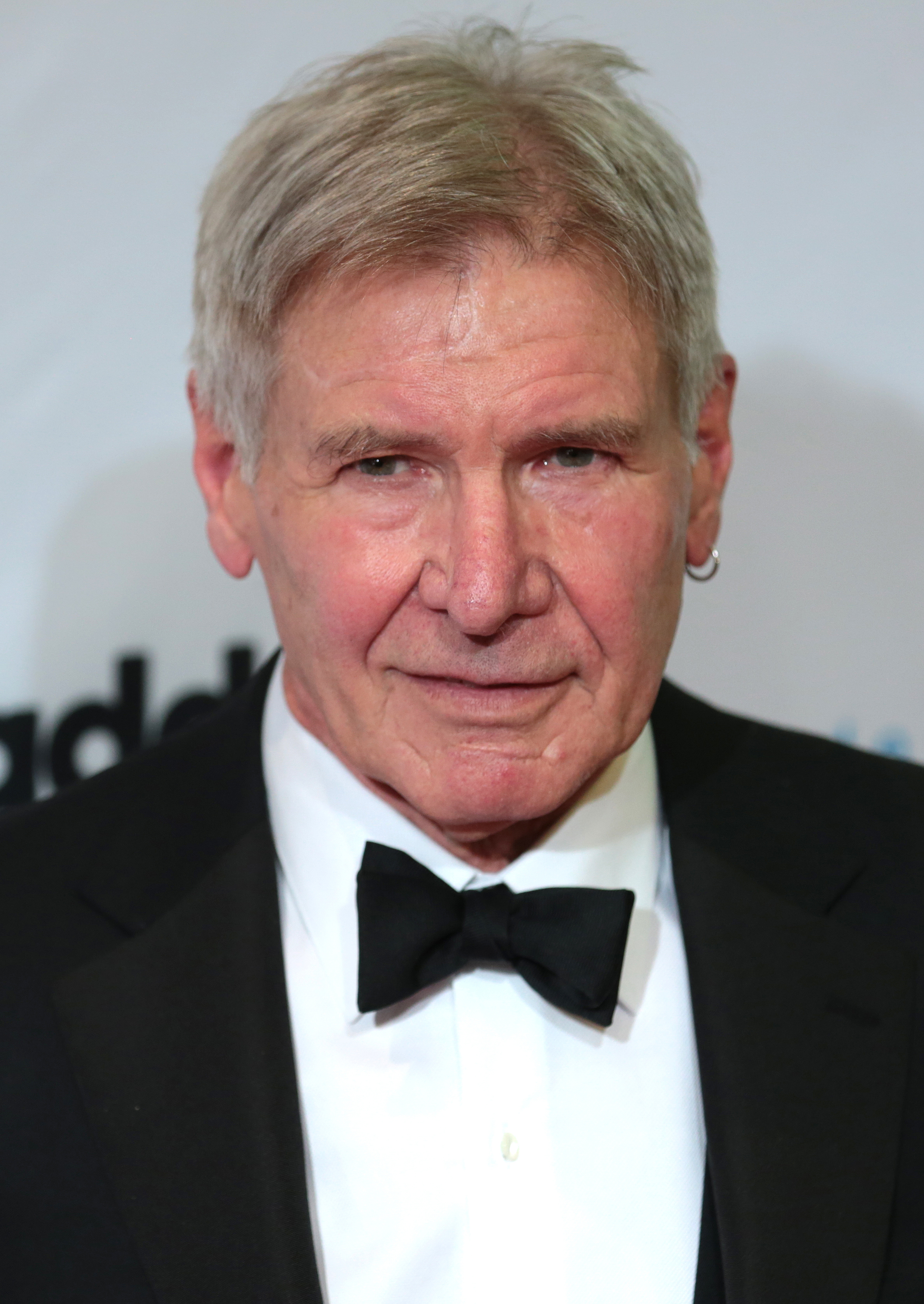
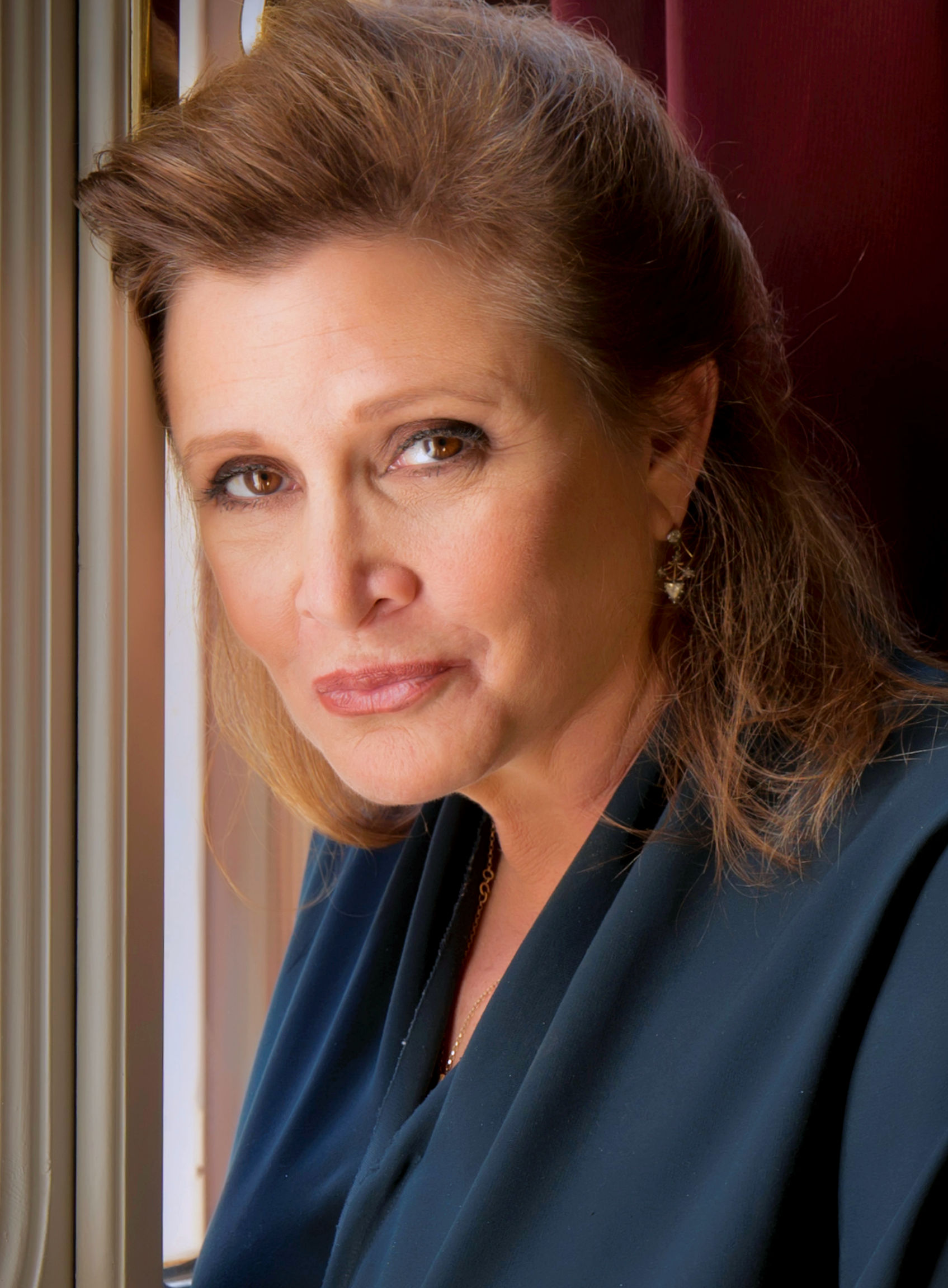
The central three characters of the original trilogy were played by Mark Hamill (Luke), Harrison Ford (Han), and Carrie Fisher (Leia), respectively.

The Tantive IV is intercepted by the Empire above the desert planet of Tatooine. Aboard, Sith Lord Darth Vader and his stormtroopers capture Princess Leia Organa, a secret member of the Rebel Alliance. Before her capture, Leia makes sure the droid R2-D2 will escape with stolen Imperial plans for an armored space station, the Death Star, and a holographic message for the Jedi Master Obi-Wan Kenobi, who has been living in exile on Tatooine. Along with C-3PO, R2-D2 falls under the ownership of Luke Skywalker, a farmboy who has been raised by his aunt Beru Whitesun Lars and uncle Owen Lars. Luke helps the droids locate Obi-Wan, now a solitary old hermit known as Ben Kenobi. He reveals himself as a friend of Luke's absent father, Anakin Skywalker, who was Obi-Wan's Jedi apprentice until being supposedly murdered by Vader. He tells Luke he must also become a Jedi. After discovering his family's homestead has been destroyed by the Empire, they go to the Mos Eisley Cantina and hire the smuggler Han Solo, his Wookiee co-pilot Chewbacca and their YT-1300 freighter, the Millennium Falcon. They discover that Leia's homeworld of Alderaan has been destroyed, and are soon captured by the planet-destroying Death Star itself. While Obi-Wan disables its tractor beam, Luke and Han rescue the captive Princess Leia, passing through incredible dangers. Finally, they deliver the Death Star plans to the Rebel Alliance with the hope of exploiting a weakness, and launch an attack on the Death Star, ultimately destroying the weapon and bringing victory to the Rebel Alliance.

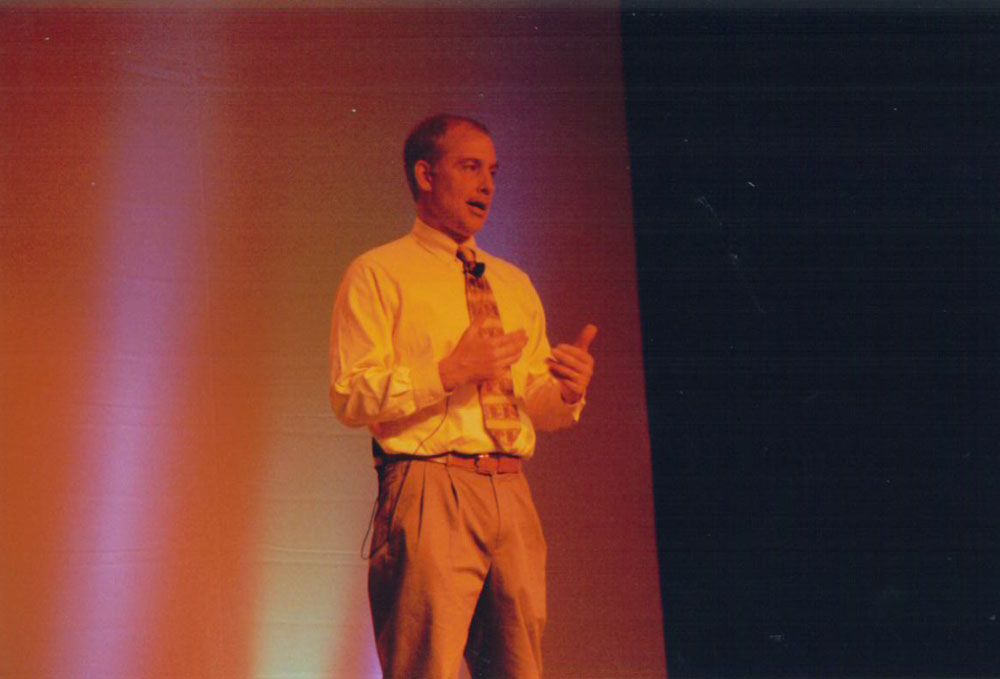
Ben Burtt designed the soundscape of the original trilogy.

The first rough draft, titled The Star Wars, introduced "the Force" and the young hero Luke Starkiller. Annikin [sic] appeared as Luke's father, a wise Jedi knight. Between drafts, Lucas read Joseph Campbell's The Hero with a Thousand Faces, and was surprised to find that his story "was following classical motifs." The third draft replaced (a deceased) Annikin with Obi-Wan Kenobi. (Note: In the draft, Kenobi's first meeting with Luke is lifted directly from The Hobbit, acknowledging Gandalf as a source of inspiration.) Some months later, Lucas had negotiated a contract that gave him rights to two sequels. Lucas hired Alan Dean Foster, who was ghostwriting the novelization of the first film, to write them—with the main creative restriction that they could be filmed on a low budget. By 1976, a fourth draft had been prepared for principal photography. The film was titled The Adventures of Luke Starkiller, as taken from the Journal of the Whills, Saga I: The Star Wars. During production, Lucas changed Luke's name to Skywalker and shortened the title to The Star Wars, and finally just Star Wars. At that point, Lucas was not expecting the film to warrant full-scale sequels. The fourth draft of the script underwent subtle changes to become a self-contained story ending with the destruction of the Empire in the Death Star. The intention was that if the film was successful, Lucas could adapt Foster's novels into low-budget sequels. By that point, Lucas had developed a tentative backstory to aid in developing the saga.

Star Wars exceeded all expectations. The success of the film and its merchandise sales led Lucas to make Star Wars the basis of an elaborate film serial, and use the profits to finance his filmmaking center, Skywalker Ranch. After the release of the first sequel, the original film was retroactively subtitled Episode IV – A New Hope in the screenplay released in the 1979 book The Art of Star Wars and for all subsequent re-releases, beginning with a theatrical re-release in 1981.

=== The Empire Strikes Back ===
Three years after the destruction of the Death Star, the Empire forces the Rebel Alliance to evacuate its secret base on Hoth. Instructed by Obi-Wan's spirit, Luke travels to the swamp world of Dagobah to find the Jedi Master Yoda in hiding. Luke's Jedi training is interrupted by Vader, who lures him into a trap by capturing Han and Leia at Cloud City, governed by Han's old friend Lando, as a result of their capture, Han Solo is frozen in carbonite and is awarded to Jabba the Hutt as he and Han had unresolved business. During a fierce duel, Vader reveals that he is Luke's father and severs his hand.

Owing to financial concerns, Alan Dean Foster's sequel novel, Splinter of the Mind's Eye (1978), restricted the story to Luke, Leia, and Darth Vader. After the success of the original film, Lucas knew a sequel would be granted a reasonable budget, and hired Leigh Brackett to write it from Lucas's story. She finished a draft by early 1978, but died of cancer before Lucas was able to discuss changes he wanted her to make. His disappointment with the first draft may have made him consider new directions. Lucas penned the next draft, the first screenplay to feature episodic numbering for a Star Wars story. Lucas found this draft enjoyable to write, as opposed to the yearlong struggle writing the first film, and quickly wrote two more in April 1978. The plot twist of Vader being Luke's father had drastic effects on the series. After writing these drafts, Lucas fleshed out the backstory between Anakin, Obi-Wan, and the Emperor.

With this new backstory in place, Lucas decided that the series would be a trilogy of trilogies, designating the first sequel Episode V – The Empire Strikes Back in the next draft. Lawrence Kasdan, who had just completed writing Raiders of the Lost Ark, was hired to write the next drafts, and given additional input from director Irvin Kershner. Kasdan, Kershner, and producer Gary Kurtz saw the film as a more serious and adult story, and developed the sequel from the light adventure roots of the first film.

=== Return of the Jedi ===
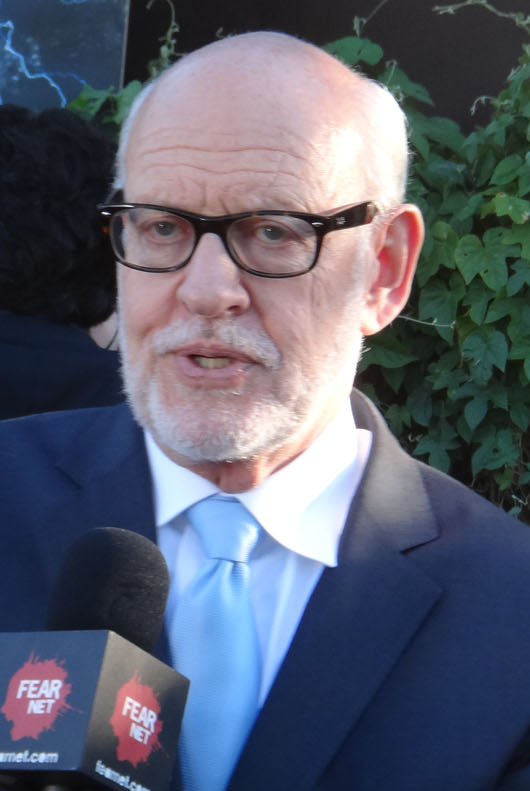
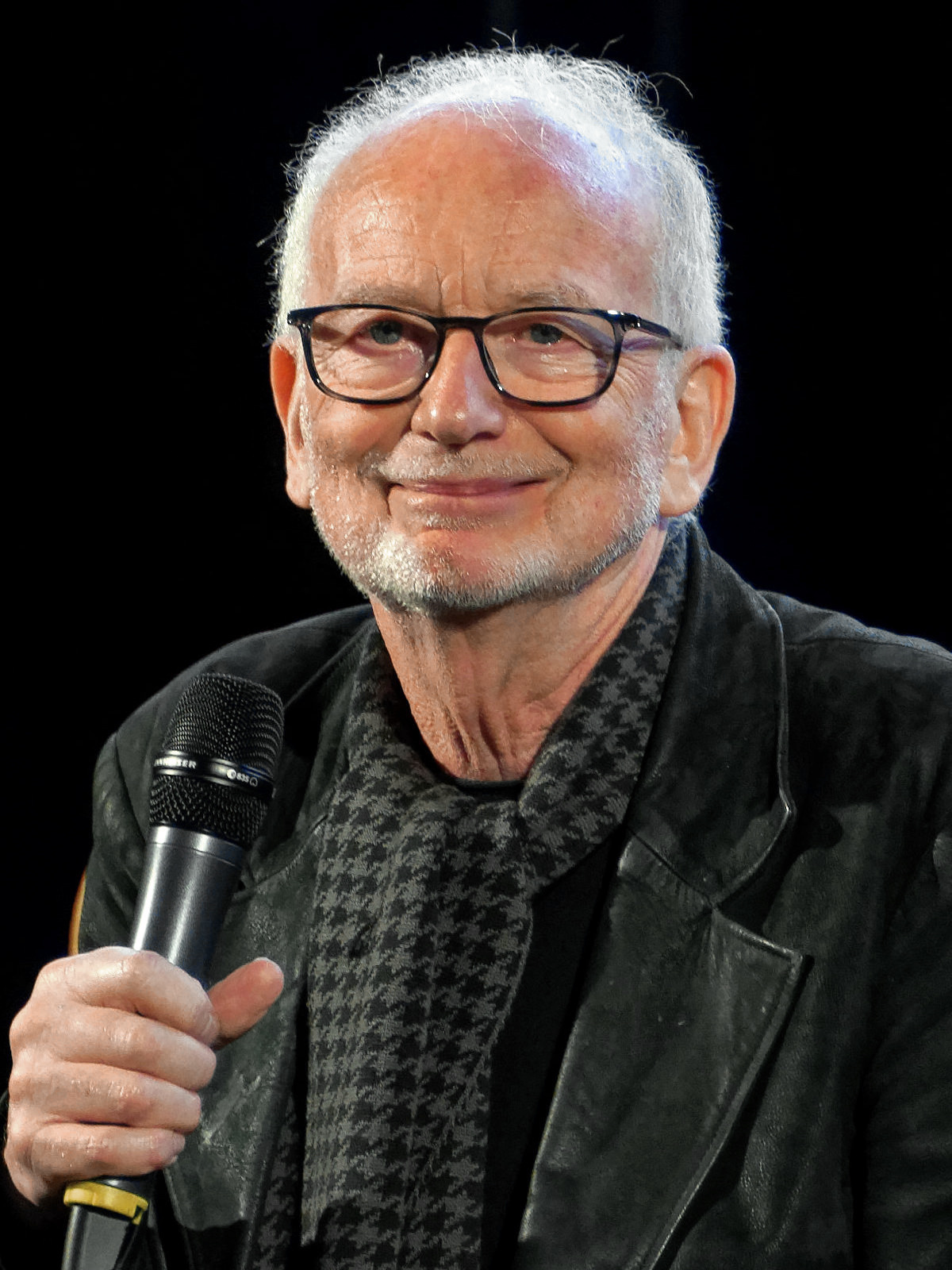
Puppeteer Frank Oz and actor Ian McDiarmid portrayed Yoda and Darth Sidious, respectively, in the original trilogy and returned to play them in the prequel trilogy and sequel trilogy.

About a year after Han's capture, Luke joins Leia and Lando in a rescue attempt to save him from the crimelord Jabba the Hutt. Afterward, Luke returns to Dagobah to complete his Jedi training, only to find Yoda on his deathbed. In his last words, Yoda confirms the truth about Luke's father, and that Luke must confront Vader again to complete his training, Yoda also reveals that Luke has a sister, that being Leia. As the Rebels lead an attack on the second Death Star, Luke engages Vader in a lightsaber duel as the Emperor watches; both Sith Lords intend to turn Luke to the dark side and take him as their apprentice, but Luke refuses to join the dark side. Palpatine gets frustrated and uses Force lightning on Luke. Vader watches then saves Luke, redeeming himself but becoming fatally injured. Luke escapes the Death Star and Lando Calrissian blows it up, and the Rebels celebrate their victory.

Ford had originally not signed on for a third film, but was convinced to return under the condition that his character would die. Kurtz wanted a bittersweet and nuanced ending outlined with Lucas that not only saw Han dead, but also depicted the Rebel forces in pieces, Leia struggling as a queen, and Luke walking off alone (as in a Spaghetti Western)—while Lucas wanted a happier ending, partly to encourage toy sales. This led to tension between the two, resulting in Kurtz leaving the production. Ford's Han Solo would ultimately be killed off in the first film of the sequel trilogy, Episode VII – The Force Awakens (2015).

== Themes ==
The Star Wars trilogy, unlike science fiction that features sleek and futuristic settings, portrays the galaxy as dirty and grimy in Lucas's concept of a "used universe". This was in part inspired by the period films of Akira Kurosawa, which like the original Star Wars trilogy, often begin in medias res without explaining a complete backstory.

Political science has been an important element of Star Wars since the franchise launched in 1977, focusing on a struggle between democracy and dictatorship. Darth Vader's design, initially inspired by Samurai armor, also incorporated a German military helmet. Lucas originally conceived of the Sith as a group that served the Emperor in the same way that the Schutzstaffel (SS) served Adolf Hitler; this was condensed into one character in the form of Vader. Lucas has also drawn parallels between Palpatine and historical dictators such as Julius Caesar, Napoleon Bonaparte, and politicians like Richard Nixon. (Note: In his early drafts, Lucas used the plot point of a dictator staying in power with the support of the military. In his comment (made in the prequel trilogy era) Lucas attributed this to Nixon's supposed intention to defy the 22nd Amendment, but the president was actually impeached and never ran for a third term. Fellow Republican President Ronald Reagan sought to repeal the movement after leaving the office.) Stormtroopers borrow the name of World War I "shock" troopers, Imperial officers wear uniforms resembling those of German forces during World War II, and political and security officers resemble the black-clad SS down to the stylized silver death's head on their caps. World War II terms were used for names in the films, e.g. the planets Kessel (a term that refers to a group of encircled forces) and Hoth (after Hermann Hoth, a German general who served on the snow-laden Eastern Front). Shots of the commanders looking through AT-AT walker viewscreens in The Empire Strikes Back resemble tank interiors, and space battles in the original film were based on dogfights from both world wars.

== Re-releases ==
The original Star Wars film was re-released theatrically in 1978, 1979, 1981 and 1982. All three films were released on various home video formats, including LaserDisc and VHS, until 1996. The trilogy was theatrically re-released in a 1997 "Special Edition", featuring various additions and changes, some of which were met with negative reception. These versions were released on VHS, replacing the original versions of the films as part of Lucas's original vision, and were created in part to reinvigorate interest in the saga ahead of the prequel trilogy. The special edition of Star Wars made its broadcast premiere on February 5, 1998, on WB stations across the country (including New York and Los Angeles). Further changes to all three films were made for a DVD release in 2004, intended to bring the films into greater continuity with the prequels. (Note: The DVD features a commentary track from Lucas, Fisher, Burtt and visual effects artist Dennis Muren. The bonus disc contains the 2004 documentary Empire of Dreams: The Story of the Star Wars Trilogy, three featurettes, teaser and theatrical trailers, television spots, image galleries, an exclusive preview of Episode III: Revenge of the Sith (2005), a playable Xbox demo of the LucasArts game Star Wars: Battlefront (2004), and a making-of documentary about the Episode III video game. The set was reissued in December 2005 as a three-disc limited edition without the bonus disc.) (Note: The set was reissued in December 2005 as a three-disc limited edition without the bonus disc.) The films were re-released again in 2006 with bonus discs of the original versions of the films (transferred from the 1993 LaserDiscs). In 2011, both together and separate prequel and original trilogy box sets were released on Blu-ray, all including another round of changes and additions.

In the early 2010s, 3D releases were planned for the then-six-film franchise. Disney ultimately decided in 2013, after acquiring Lucasfilm in 2012, to cancel the remaining releases to focus on The Force Awakens.

In 2019, Kathleen Kennedy, president of Lucasfilm since the 2012 acquisition, stated that she would not make alterations to Lucas's original trilogy, because "those will always remain his." While promoting The Rise of Skywalker, director J. J. Abrams expressed his hopes that the original versions of the trilogy would be officially released, but said that the powers that be had told him "that that's not necessarily possible". He further said that when making The Force Awakens, he had gotten into a disagreement about the dialogue between Vader and the Emperor in The Empire Strikes Back before realizing that different versions of the film were being referred to; he cited the fan-created Despecialized Editions of the films, while the other party had recalled the current official version.

It was initially unclear whether the first six Star Wars films would be available on Disney+ upon its launch, as TBS held streaming rights through 2024 as part of its cable rights to the franchise. However, on April 11, 2019, it was announced that the films would be available at launch.

== Reception ==
=== Box office ===
Film	Release date	Budget	Box office revenue				Box office ranking		Ref.
Film	Release date	Budget	North America	Adjusted for inflation (North America) (Note: Adjusting for inflation is complicated by the fact that the first films have had multiple releases in different years, so their earnings cannot be simply adjusted by the initial year of release. Inflation adjusted figures for 2005 can be found in Block, Alex Ben; Wilson, Lucy Autrey, eds. (2010). George Lucas's Blockbusting: A Decade-By-Decade Survey of Timeless Movies Including Untold Secrets of Their Financial and Cultural Success. HarperCollins. p. 519. ISBN 978-0-06-177889-6. Adjustment to constant dollars is undertaken in conjunction with the United States Consumer Price Index provided by the Federal Reserve Bank of Minneapolis, using 2005 as the base year.)	Other territories	Worldwide	All-time North America	All-time worldwide	Ref.
Star Wars	May 25, 1977	$11 million	$460,998,007	$1,608,419,900	$314,600,000	$775,598,007	No. 16	No. 90	
The Empire Strikes Back	May 21, 1980	$33 million	$290,075,067	$886,571,200	$257,900,000	$547,975,067	No. 91	No. 183	
Return of the Jedi	May 25, 1983	$32.5 million	$309,306,177	$849,356,500	$166,000,000	$475,306,177	No. 75	No. 220	
Total		$76.5 million	$1,060,779,251	$3,344,347,600	$728,500,000	$1,798,879,251	#2	#2	

=== Critical response ===
The original Star Wars film was released in the summer of 1977 to critical acclaim and was a huge summer blockbuster, surpassing Jaws (1975), until 1982 when it was surpassed by E.T. the Extra-Terrestrial. The following year, it won six out of its eleven nominations at the 50th Academy Awards. The success of the first film led to it becoming a pop cultural phenomenon spawning countless TV spin-offs, video games, films and a multi-merchandising empire. It was followed by two installments, The Empire Strikes Back (1980) and Return of the Jedi (1983), which were also both very successful, with the former's climax, where Vader says that he is Luke's father, becoming one of the most famous plot twists in motion picture history.

The original trilogy was praised for its groundbreaking visual and sound effects, John Williams' music, writing, characters and concept. Star Wars and The Empire Strikes Back are considered by many to be among the greatest movies ever made, while Return of the Jedi was well-received but not considered to be on par with its predecessors.

Film	Rotten Tomatoes	Metacritic	Cinemascore
Star Wars	93% (8.80/10 average rating) (140 reviews)	90 (24 reviews)	A+
The Empire Strikes Back	95% (9.00/10 average rating) (111 reviews)	82 (25 reviews)	A+
Return of the Jedi	83% (7.30/10 average rating) (103 reviews)	58 (24 reviews)	A+

=== Accolades ===
In 1989, the Library of Congress selected the original Star Wars film for preservation in the U.S. National Film Registry, as being "culturally, historically, or aesthetically significant." The Empire Strikes Back was selected in 2010, and Return of the Jedi was selected in 2021. 35 mm reels of the 1997 Special Editions were the versions initially presented for preservation because of the difficulty of transferring from the original prints, but it was later revealed that the Library possessed a copyright deposit print of the original theatrical releases. By 2015, Star Wars had been transferred to a 2K scan which can be viewed by appointment.

==== Academy Awards ====
Academy Awards	Awards won		
Academy Awards	Star Wars	The Empire Strikes Back	Return of the Jedi
Academy Awards	50th Academy Awards	53rd Academy Awards	56th Academy Awards
Best Picture	Nominated	—N/a	—N/a
Best Director	Nominated	—N/a	—N/a
Best Supporting Actor	Nominated (Note: Alec Guinness for the role of Obi-Wan Kenobi)	—N/a	—N/a
Best Costume Design	Won	—N/a	—N/a
Best Film Editing	Won	—N/a	—N/a
Best Original Score	Won	Nominated	Nominated
Best Original Screenplay	Nominated	—N/a	—N/a
Best Production Design	Won	Nominated	Nominated
Best Sound Editing	—N/a	—N/a	Nominated
Best Sound Mixing	Won	Won	Nominated
Best Visual Effects	Won	—N/a	—N/a
Special Achievement Award	Won (Note: Ben Burtt for the creation of the alien, creature, and robot voices)	Won (Note: Brian Johnson, Richard Edlund, Dennis Muren and Bruce Nicholson for visual effects)	Won (Note: Richard Edlund, Dennis Muren, Ken Ralston and Phil Tippett for visual effects)

== Impact and legacy ==
=== Popular culture ===
The popularity of the films have generated numerous references in popular culture works from television series such as The Simpsons, Pinky and the Brain, Family Guy, South Park, The Big Bang Theory and Robot Chicken and films such as Clerks, Free Guy and Toy Story 2, and in the political lexicon, as in Ted Kennedy's nickname for Ronald Reagan's Strategic Defense Initiative. The trilogy's artistic and technological achievements have been influential on other filmmakers, including Ridley Scott, James Cameron, David Fincher, Joss Whedon, Peter Jackson and Christopher Nolan, as well as sequel trilogy director J. J. Abrams.

The trilogy's impact has led to future careers of its stars including Mark Hamill (Luke Skywalker), Carrie Fisher (Princess Leia), Harrison Ford (Han Solo), Anthony Daniels (C-3PO), Kenny Baker (R2-D2), Peter Mayhew (Chewbacca), James Earl Jones (Darth Vader), Billy Dee Williams (Lando Calrissian) and Warwick Davis (Wicket W. Warrick).

=== Prequel and sequel trilogies ===
The success and large impact of the original Star Wars trilogy led to two more trilogies, both financially successful, with individual installments receiving mixed to positive reviews.

The prequel trilogy consists of The Phantom Menace (1999), Attack of the Clones (2002) and Revenge of the Sith (2005), all directed by George Lucas. The prequels feature Baker, Daniels, Oz, Mayhew and McDiarmid reprising their roles, alongside Ewan McGregor, Natalie Portman, Hayden Christensen, Liam Neeson and Samuel L. Jackson. After completing his six-film saga, Lucas stated that there would be no further sequels.

In 2012, Disney purchased Lucasfilm and produced a sequel trilogy. This consists of The Force Awakens (2015), The Last Jedi (2017), and The Rise of Skywalker (2019). Lucas had little direct involvement in the creation of these films. The new cast features Daisy Ridley, John Boyega, Oscar Issac, Adam Driver, Domhnall Gleeson, and Andy Serkis, with several cast members from the original trilogy reprising their roles.

=== Other media ===
Star Wars has also been spun off into films outside of the Skywalker Saga, numerous television spin-offs, and hundreds of video games, books, comics, and theme park attractions at Disneyland and Walt Disney World.

== Works cited ==
- Bouzereau, Laurent (1997). The Annotated Screenplays. Del Rey. ISBN 978-0-345-40981-2.
- Kaminski, Michael (2008) [2007]. The Secret History of Star Wars. Legacy Books Press. ISBN 978-0-9784652-3-0.
- Rinzler, Jonathan W. (2007). The Making of Star Wars: The Definitive Story Behind the Original Film (Star Wars). Del Rey. ISBN 978-0-345-49476-4.
