= Tusken Raiders =

Fictional alien race

- Star Wars race
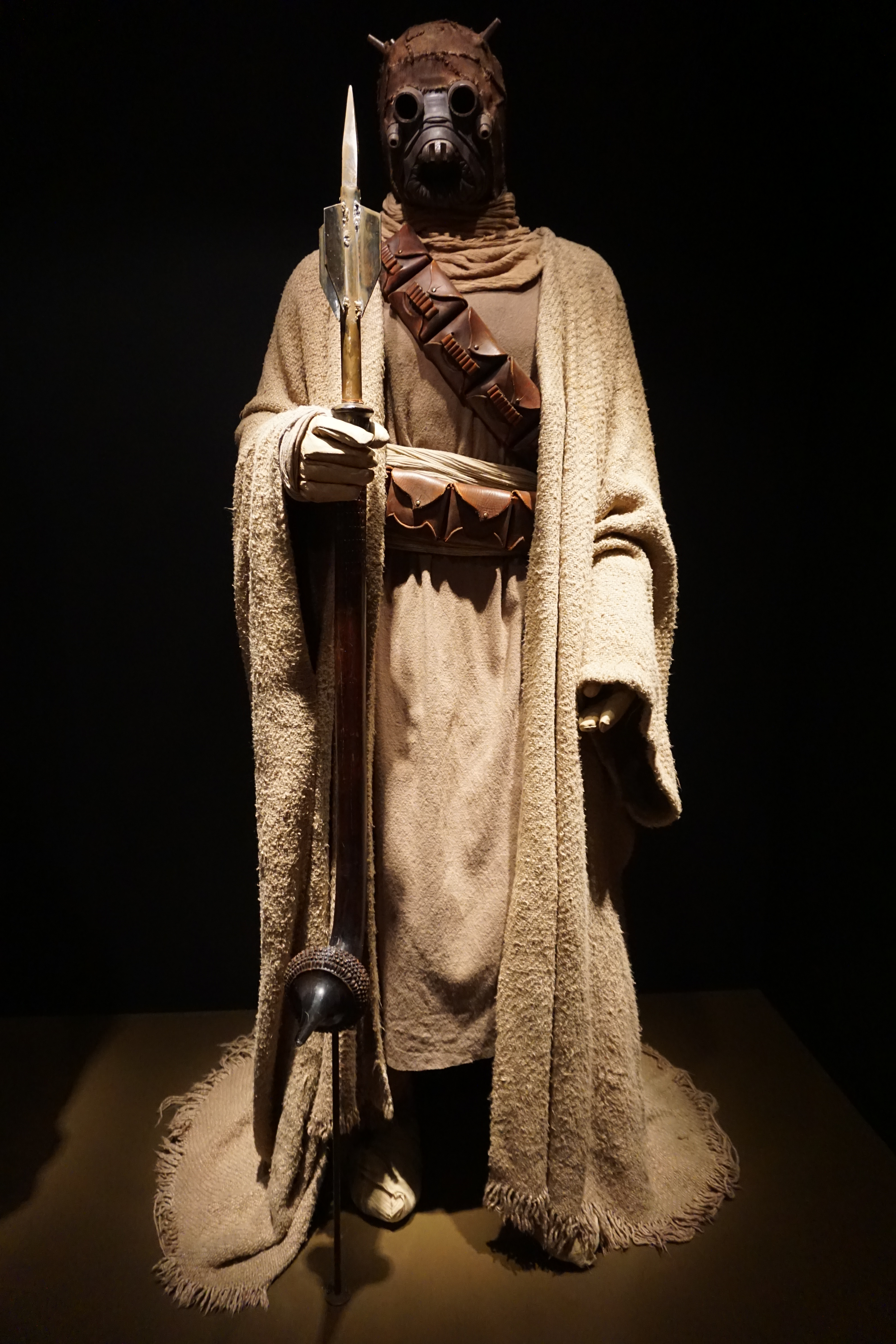
- Tusken Raider male costume with gaffi from Episode IV
- First appearance: Star Wars: Episode IV - A New Hope (1977)

In-universe information
- Home world: Tatooine
- Language: Tusken
- Leader: Tribal leaders

Tusken Raiders (Note: Informally "Sand People" or simply Tuskens.) are a fictional alien race in the Star Wars franchise. They first appeared in Star Wars (1977).

== Depiction ==
The Tusken Raiders are depicted as xenophobic and are known to be aggressive in their interactions with other species, though they are capable of compromise and cooperation with outsiders. They dress in heavy cloth robes, and cover their heads with strips of cloth to secure a breath mask and eye protection. They learned to train the Banthas native to Tatooine as mounts, and a marauding group of Tuskens will ride them single file, to hide their numbers.

== Star Wars appearances ==
Tusken Raiders first appeared in Star Wars (1977). Early on in the film, a party of them attack Luke Skywalker and knock him unconscious. However, Obi-Wan Kenobi frightens them off by imitating the call of a local predator and rescues Luke.

Tusken Raiders briefly appear in Episode I: The Phantom Menace, taking shots at the Boonta Eve Classic podracer pilots, and again in Episode II: Attack of the Clones, set 22 years before Star Wars; in this film, they kidnap Anakin Skywalker's mother, Shmi Skywalker, and torture her for a month. Anakin eventually finds her, but she is mortally injured and dies in his arms. Seized by a violent rage, Anakin slaughters the entire tribe out of revenge, including the women and children. This was referenced by Chancellor Palpatine in Episode III: Revenge of the Sith to justify Anakin's reasoning for killing Count Dooku, and after he says it, a faint sound of the Tusken Raider's braying calls is heard in Anakin's mind as he ponders. In Star Wars Rebels Season 3, Episode 20, a group of Tuskens attack Ezra and Chopper when they land on Tatooine to look for Kenobi, successfully destroying their ship. However, Ezra and Chopper escape and the Tuskens are killed by Darth Maul.

Tusken Raiders appear in The Mandalorian. In the Season 1 episode "Chapter 5: The Gunslinger", Din Djarin comes across a small group of Raiders while travelling through their land, in search of a bounty named Fennec Shand, trading Toro Calican's electrobinoculars as payment. They are initially hostile until he communicates with them via sign language. In the Season 2 episode "Chapter 9: The Marshal", a Tusken clan teams up with villagers from Mos Pelgo in order to slay a Krayt dragon.

A tribe of Tusken Raiders appear in various flashbacks in the first three episodes of The Book of Boba Fett, where they find Boba Fett after the latter escaped from the Sarlacc, was robbed of his Mandalorian armor, and left for dead. They initially force him to work as a slave digging for black melons in the desert, until he wins their respect and admiration after he kills a large sand creature, saving a Tusken child's life in the process. Following this, the Tuskens welcome Fett as one of their own, teaching him their combat style and desert survival skills, and eventually initiating him into their tribe after he passes a trial. In turn, Fett helps the Tuskens raid a Pyke Syndicate spice train that had been attacking their territory, teaching them how to ride speeder bikes in the process, and demands that the Pykes pay a toll to the tribe before entering their territory again in the future. However, after returning from collecting the toll, Fett finds that the tribe has been massacred, seemingly by the Nikto gang he had stolen the speeder bikes from, and holds an impromptu funeral. In the seventh episode, it is revealed that it was the Pykes who killed the tribe and framed the Nikto gang.

== Expanded Universe ==
According to the Star Wars Expanded Universe sources, Tusken Raiders are named after Fort Tusken, an early Old Republic mining settlement in which all of the settlers were overwhelmed, captured, or killed by Tusken Raiders, then referred to as "Sand People". The attack probably occurred due to the fort's placement over one of the Raiders' holy wells.

Although the Sand People are aggressive and violent by nature, they have deep-seated traditions that they cling to tightly. Young raiders are required to prove their adulthood in various physical activities. While the Sand People have no written language, the most revered member of a Tusken clan is the storyteller. He knows the life-story of every member of his clan, and also knows of the clan's history. The storyteller is required to memorize the histories word-for-word, eliminating any chance for misinterpretation or distortion. Apprentice storytellers often are more hard-pressed to prove themselves than warriors, for a single mistake in reciting the histories means instant death by decapitation. As violent as their nature is, Sand People stay as far from the moisture farmers as the farmers do them. There are occasional skirmishes with the more outlying settlements.

The comic book series Star Wars: Republic explains that exiled Jedi Sharad Hett and his son A'Sharad Hett lived among the Tusken Raiders for many years. Hett was one of the few non-Tuskens to be accepted into their ranks and was even given the title of "warlord". Although A'Sharad Hett believed he was half-Tusken for the better part of his life, during his training on Coruscant he learned that Humans and Tusken Raiders were genetically unable to interbreed. This leads him to believe that his mother must have been a human, captured by the Tusken Raiders at a young age and raised as a Tusken. The series Star Wars: Legacy, set some 200 years later, reveals that A'Sharad eventually turned to the dark side of the Force and, as the Sith Lord Darth Krayt, briefly conquered the galaxy.

In the Junior Jedi Knights and New Jedi Order series, it is revealed that Jedi Knight Tahiri Veila was raised by the Tusken Raiders after they killed her parents.

A Tusken Raider named "Hoar" appears as a playable character in the PlayStation fighting game Star Wars: Masters of Teräs Käsi. In the Xbox Original game Star Wars: Battlefront II players are allowed to play as Tusken Raiders in a special game mode called "hunt".

Tusken Raiders appear in Knights of the Old Republic and The Old Republic when players visit Tatooine. In Knights of the Old Republic, it is suggested that humans, Jawas, and Tusken Raiders share a common ancestry and that Tusken Raiders refer to themselves as the "ghorfa".

== Concept and creation ==
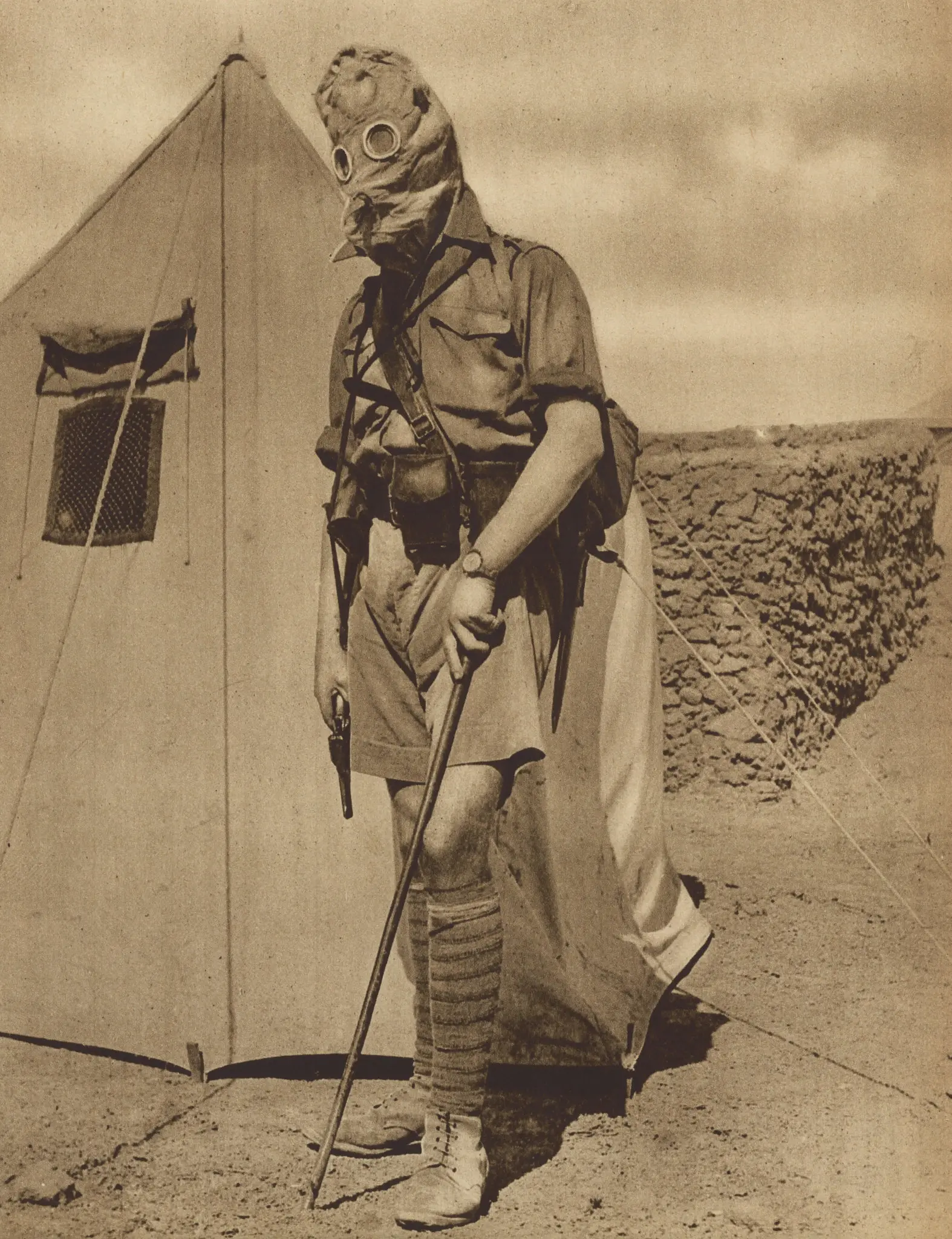
The New York Times compared the combat uniform worn by some British soldiers during the Mesopotamian campaign of World War I to the Tusken Raiders costume.

Star Wars creator George Lucas said that the Tuskens' design was inspired by the Bedouin, an Arab tribe from the desert regions of North Africa.

=== Tusken Sign Language ===
In his script for The Mandalorian episode "Chapter 5: The Gunslinger", Dave Filoni mentioned that the Tusken Raiders should use some form of sign language. Deaf actor Troy Kotsur was hired as a consultant. When developing the sign language, he attempted to avoid American Sign Language and suit the Tuskens' cultural and environmental context. A lifelong Star Wars fan, Kotsur also played a Tusken scout in the episode. The sign language later appeared to a greater extent in "Chapter 9: The Marshal", as well as the first three episodes of The Book of Boba Fett.

"Chapter 5: The Gunslinger" was the first time that Tuskens had communicated on-screen. Media outlets praised the sign language for humanizing the Tuskens and moving away from their characterization as indigenous "savages". Fans, especially deaf viewers, were similarly enthusiastic about the inclusion of an alien sign language in Star Wars and started a Facebook group to further develop the Tusken language. (Note: Attributed to multiple references:)

== Reception and cultural impact ==
Tusken Raiders have been criticized as an Arab or Islamic stereotype. Further cultural criticism compares the representation of the Tusken Raiders to stereotypes of Indigenous people.

In October of 2024, the website of the Defense Visual Information Distribution Service posted a photo of a pilot wearing a shoulder patch with the words "Houthi Hunting Club Red Sea 2023-2024" over a picture of Tusken Raiders. After facing criticism for the racialized nature of the patch, the Defense Department removed the photo.
