= List of Star Wars creatures =

The universe of Star Wars, a space opera media franchise, features a broad variety of different alien creatures. These aliens can be sapient or non-sapient, serving as species for characters, setting pieces, plot devices, and background elements. The diversity of alien species in Star Wars is considered to be a strong point of the franchise. The creatures are designed to be believable, recognizable, and often endearing—in this way, many creatures from Star Wars have become well known in popular culture.

The types of creatures in this list are listed by category and then in alphabetical order.

== Humans and humanoid species ==
=== Humans ===
Humans are a species in the fictional Star Wars universe. They are the most numerous and dominant species, with apparently millions of major and minor colonies throughout the galaxy. Humans are native to many different worlds and are characterized by multidimensional complex personalities, that are both individual and unique. They are the only race accepted as pure by Emperor Palpatine.

By the time the hyperdrive was invented, humans were already present on a few scattered worlds throughout the galaxy; according to the New Essential Chronology, the humans of Coruscant managed to send out a number of 'sleeper ships' between the fall of the Rakatan Infinite Empire and the invention of the hyperdrive. Star Wars humans are mostly biologically identical to real-life humans.

The presence of ordinary humans in the story is important dramatically and the first movie establishes their vulnerability and weakness. Luke Skywalker's introduction early in the first movie was rewritten to establish this.

In the Star Wars mythology, the human homeworld, according to the New Essential Chronology, is generally believed to be Coruscant. However, there is actually no real consensus on the issue; according to releases from the official Starwars.com site, the ancient human home world has simply been lost to history.

Star Wars humans live on many different worlds throughout the galaxy, with many populations living together with several other species—something which is most common either on the cosmopolitan worlds at the core, or on the frontier at the Outer Rim of the galaxy, such as on Tatooine.

- Mandalorians: Mandalorians are a culture of humans using armors from Mandalore. They are descended from the Taung, a gray-skinned humanoid race native to Coruscant. The Taung are forced from Coruscant by the rising human population. The warring race name their new planet "Mandalore", after their leader, Mandalore the First. After the extinction of the Taung, the Mandalorian culture lives on and comprises various species from around the galaxy.

=== Humanoid species ===
The following is a list of sapient humanoid species from the Star Wars franchise.

- List of Star Wars species (A–E)
  - Dathomirian: The Zabrak, also known as Iridonians, were a carnivorous humanoid species native to Iridonia, a planet located in the Mid Rim known for its inhospitable terrain and fierce predatory life. They were a race known for having a fierce sense of self-determination and an equally dominant need for independence. Zabrak resembled Humans to some degree, but had a number of significant physical characteristics that set them apart, the most striking being a series of vestigial horns that crowned the heads of both males and females. These horns grew at puberty in varying patterns and signified that the time of their rite of passage was drawing near. A distinct group of Zabrak also intermingled with the Nightsisters of Dathomir, and both Darth Maul and his brother Savage Opress came from this group.
  - Duros (or "Durosians") are humanoids from planet Duro, with large, ovular heads, red eyes and blue skin. They were supposedly the first to discover and utilize hyperspace, resulting in the development of hyperdrives and other related technological advancements. They are proud of their heritage and many take up the mantle of spacefarer. Cad Bane was a notorious Duros bounty hunter, while others are seen in Mos Eisley.
  - Ewok: The Ewok is a small, sentient furry creature who lives in trees on the forest moon of Endor.
- List of Star Wars species (F–J)
  - Jawa: Jawa are creatures that inhabit Tatooine. They wear hoods over their heads to cover their identities from outsiders. They roam the land in sandcrawlers, dealing in droids and spare parts for space ships.
  - Geonosian: Geonosians are sentient, winged insectoid creatures native to Geonosis.
  - Gungan: Gungans are sentient amphibious creatures native to the swamps of Naboo. Gungans first appeared in Star Wars: Episode I – The Phantom Menace, including the controversial character of Jar Jar Binks. Despite his lack of intelligence, he becomes a representative in the galactic senate in place of Padme Amadala.
  - Ithorian: Ithorians are a hammer-headed humanoid species. They have appeared in Star Wars Episode IV: A New Hope, Star Wars: Knights of the Old Republic II and Star Wars: Bounty Hunter.
  - Hutt: Hutts are portly, grotesque, slug-like creatures native to Nal Hutta. Many are very greedy and very gluttonous. Some famous Hutts, such as Jabba the Hutt, are crime lords.
- List of Star Wars species (K–O)
  - Kaminoan: Kaminoans are tall, blueish gray humanoids with long slender necks. Native to the planet Kamino, they were instrumental in building and maintaining the clone army used by Republic forces.
  - Neimoidian: Neimoidians are large-eyed, amphibian-like sapient bipeds native to the planet of Neimoidia. Many Neimoidians are wealthy businessmen. Despite their commonly menacing attitudes, however, Neimoidians are generally dishonest and easily frightened, preferring to lie even to their leaders, whether it be for profit or for self-safety.
- List of Star Wars species (P–T)
  - Togruta: Togruta are species from the planet Shili. They are a humanoid race distinguished by their lekku (similar to those of Twi'leks, and more commonly called 'head tails'), which are striped to help them blend in with their natural surroundings. Togruta possess a form of passive echolocation by means of their hollow montrals, which allows them to sense space and the proximity and movement of physical objects around them. Togruta work well in large groups, and individualism is seen as abnormal within their culture. Jedi Shaak Ti and Anakin Skywalker's former Padawan Ahsoka Tano are Togruta.
  - Tusken Raiders: Tusken Raiders, also known as Sand People, are vicious humanoid creatures native to Tatooine. "Tuskens" are almost always wrapped completely in clothing, concealing their identity. Their first appearance is in Star Wars (1977) when Luke and C-3PO search for R2-D2 on Tatooine.
  - Twi'lek: Twi'leks are humanoid creatures native to Ryloth. Their culture strongly suggests male rule and has been that way since Nola Tarkona founded the Diversity Alliance in the Young Jedi Knights series of books. These creatures have two "head-tails" called lekku that extend from the back of their head. The muscles in these tails can be used to relate the mood of their owner. Most of twi'lek economy is based on slave trade. Female slaves were sold as dancers, assistants, and into other lowly jobs until Nola took over Ryloth. After her takeover most of the economy was based on Ryll spice, which grows native in the caves of Ryloth. Known Twi'lek include Padawan Devon Izara, theorized to later become Sith Lord Darth Talon; Jedi Master Aayla Secura; Mission and Griff Vao from the game Star Wars: Knights of the Old Republic; and Oola, a slave dancer in Jabba the Hutt's Palace on Tatooine.
- List of Star Wars species (U–Z)
  - Wookiee: Wookiees are large, hairy creatures native to Kashyyyk. Despite having great strength and a short temper, they are described as an intelligent and scientific race.

== Animal non-sapient creatures ==
The following is a list of non-sapient (sometimes referred to erroneously as non-sentient), animal fictional creatures species found in the Star Wars franchise.

== A ==
=== Acklay ===
An acklay is a large non-sapient creature resembling a praying mantis. It is equipped with three eyes and six legs with four digits each, the fourth of which terminates in an elongated scythe-like claw and has a crest to protect its long neck from aerial attacks. As a carnivore, it possesses a mouth full of long, sharp teeth that it uses for catching fish. It originated on Vendaxa, but has since adapted to other environments such as Felucia and Geonosis. One was killed by Obi-Wan Kenobi during the Battle of Geonosis.

=== Air shrimp ===
Air shrimps are flying shrimp native to Bespin that float in the upper atmosphere. Not much is known about them, besides the fact that they are eaten by the birdlike Rawwks.

=== Aiwha ===
Aiwha are aquatic mammals, 30 feet in length, that somewhat resemble very large mynocks and cetaceans. Most claim that its home world is Naboo but it also lives on Kamino. They dwell in the oceans and the sky above it. The Gungans and Kaminoans ride on them.

=== Akk dog ===
Akk dogs are lizard-like creatures the length of a speeder. They formed Force bonds with any handler, Force-sensitive or not. Commonly seen as Jedi pets or companions, their hides are resistant to lightsabers. They are native to Haruun Kal.

=== Angler ===
Crustaceal multi-ocular mollusks from Yavin 4 that fish for underwater prey, such as the Aquatic Gundark and the pinkish salamander, by dangling their root-like tentacles/claws below the water's surface.

=== Anooba ===
Anoobas are scavengers that will occasionally attack large creatures such as rontos and eopies, but most commonly they attack smaller creatures. Their strong jaws have a horny exterior beak that is able to crush thick bones. They have a long tail that acts as a counterbalance during sprints, and helps to regulate their internal temperature. They range in weights between 25 and 40 kilograms (though the males are often larger than females). Anoobas have unregulated appetites, and they will gorge until they can no longer move. They are social animals and hunt in packs of 10 to 12, within the pack there are 2 dominant adults, an alpha male, and an alpha female. Female anoobas foster between 3 and 4 cubs per season, they feed them through methods of regurgitation. There are some anoobas that have been domesticated by the tusken raiders. There are also some escaped packs roaming the streets of Coruscant.

=== Asyyyriak ===
The Asyyyriak lives in the forests of Kashyyyk. It spends most of its time high above the forest floor. It has an elongated head and a pointed snout filled with sharp teeth. It has six legs, which are positioned along its flexible spine to provide a highly maneuverable frame. Each foot has four toes, which end in razor sharp talons. Its body is covered with long brown and green hair, which lies on top of green skin.

Asyyyriaks primarily prey upon avians and other small animals. A few small Wookiee children are lost each year because of the Asyyyriak. Asyyyriaks hibernate during cold seasons, and tend to favor a hollow tree trunk as a den.

== B ==
=== Bandara ===
Bandaras, which are also known as sandbar dwellers, are beetles from the planet Devaron who live in huge unyielding swarms on sandbars and beaches. Their unified mating call during the summer can be unbearable to hear.

=== Bantha ===
The bantha is a big, shaggy, mammalian mount with spiraling goat-like horns. Herds of bantha inhabit the desert wastes of Tatooine in the outer Rim, as well as grasslands and plains of other worlds throughout the Star Wars galaxy. They are very sociable animals, have long sticky tongues to grasp prey, and are notorious for their smell. Since bantha are found in such a big number of agricultural systems, it is believed that early space settlers transported the species to new worlds. Although heavily domesticated, on some planets wild herds can still be found. There are sundry known varieties of banthas in existence, including the common bantha (Bantha majorus), the smaller, shy dwarf bantha, and the rangier, slender dune bantha. One specific subtype of bantha is the Kashyyyk grayclimber, which differs in that the grayclimber has big cranial bone plates in place of horns; it has also adapted to climbing through the evolution of articulated toes that can grip wroshyr trees. Banthas can be seen in video games and the movie Star Wars Episode IV: A New Hope. They can also be found in The Mandalorian "Chapter 9: The Marshal". Also Star Wars Episode II: Attack of the Clones. They were commonly used on Tatooine by the Tusken Raiders, shaping symbiotic bonds with each other. When a Tusken Raider child reach the age of seven, a bantha of the same sex is ceremoniously given to the youngling, as its mate in life. When Tusken Raiders marry, the couple's banthas mate. When the Tusken Raiders have an offspring, the banthas also produce an offspring, both of them having same sex at the same time. Upon the death of a bantha or a Tusken Raider, the species left behind will often commit suicide.

=== Barri ===
Barri are enigmatic spacefaring creatures that can hitch rides on asteroids and derelict spacecraft for thousands of years in space. Their acid secretions break down and help the barris digest the asteroid they ride on.

=== Beck-tori ===
Beck-tori are aquatic parasites endemic to the planet Nam Priax. They are blue and look like eels. These creatures channel the force to enhance their senses and heal themselves.

=== Beldon ===
Beldons are colossal floating creatures found in the lower atmosphere of Bespin. They are gas-filled creatures that can metabolize the natural chemicals and biospheric plankton of the slushy gas-liquid-solid interface (via long, trailing, tentacles) of the lower atmosphere. Beldons grow between 800m and 10 km. They travel together in herds. Their light-sensitive skin cells aid with defense and metabolism. Eggs and sperm are released into the atmosphere and drift freely until random fertilization. They have a caudal fin on their back to help with stability. They excrete Tibannna gas which can be collected and used as a hyperdrive coolant. They are surrounded by a small electrical field to detect approaching danger. A herd of Beldons are seen in season 2 of Star Wars Rebels.

=== Bergruutfa ===
Bergruutfa are large 7m tall herbivorous grazers from the planet Teloc Ol-sen. They have been known to serve as caravan beasts, warbeasts and farm animals, and have an armored frill around their head.

=== Blase Tree Goat ===
The Blase Tree Goat, as called by the natives who live on Endor, is known across the galaxy as a Choreamnos. A lazy animal that looks like a cross between a goat and a sloth. They hardly move except to get leaves on other branches.

=== Blistmok ===
The Blistmok is a lizard, native to the planet of Mustafar. They are usually dark red or a dark teal color.

=== Blurrg ===
The blurrg is used for transportation on Ryloth, on Endor's forest moon, and on Arvala-7, where some are found in a feral state. It is typically used as a beast of burden by the freedom fighters of Cham Syndulla, and marauders. It is found in Star Wars: The Clone Wars and in The Mandalorian episode one. They are tough-skinned reptilian herbivores known for their small brains and simple intelligence. Their brain is roughly the size of a jubba nut. Their dense skull is used as a battering ram, they utter frequent low roars, but besides this no other communications. Males are eaten during mating. Their eggs are laid in clutches between 5–6, and are left where they drop. Young stay inside their mothers' protective circles during early years. On Endor they are preyed upon by boar-wolves, and are objects of derision in Ewok culture and folk-lore.

=== Bog rat ===
Bog rats are large, one eyed rats, found on the planet Bogano. These Rodents were first introduced in Jedi: Fallen Order.

=== Borcatu ===
Borcatus are a non-canon, quadrupedal, scavenger vermin found amongst garbage and trash on thousands of civilized planets. Up to 0.5-metre (1.6 ft) in length, they are protected from the environment and predators by strong, armored scales.

=== Bordok ===
The bordok is a herbivorous horse-like animal, native to the forest moon of Endor. They have an erect mane, and short, knobby, forward-pointing horns on either side of their heads. They are used by Ewoks as pack animals and mounts if captured.

=== Bursa ===
Bursas are carnivorous quadrupeds native to Naboo. They live in mud huts or burrows they build in the ground. Rumors are, being that they hunted and killed the early Gungan race, they are partially responsible for the Gungans seeking shelter from them underwater.

== C ==
=== Can-cell ===
The can-cell is a monstrous dragonfly, about 1.5 m (4.9 ft) long, which flies the skies of Kashyyyk and Teth. It is seen in Star Wars: The Clone Wars and Star Wars: Episode III – Revenge of the Sith.

=== Cannok ===
Cannoks inhabit the forest moon of Dxun. Cannoks are small, annoying creatures that have the ability to consume anything, including mechanical components.

=== Cherfer ===
Cherfers are aggressive, quadrupedal, herd animals from the planet Elom. Although they are omnivores, these beasts are quick to anger and prefer meat.

=== Chiilak ===
Chiilak are thick-furred, six-limbed bipeds that inhabit the glacial regions of the moon Misnor, and can grow up to 2.2 m (7.2 ft) tall. Although they can breathe air, they can hold their breath underwater for up to 20 minutes; similarly, their webbed paws make for easy swimming.

=== Clawbird ===
The clawbird is a black-feathered carrion-eating bird, similar to a vulture. They live on Tatooine, Geonosis and Wayland.

=== Colo claw fish ===
Colo Claw Fish are immense underwater carnivores that dwell in the porous caverns of the Naboo core, appearing in Star Wars: Episode I – The Phantom Menace. Natural phosphorescence give its eel-like skin an eerie glow. They have flattened flukes for bodies, with a large toothy snout flanked by hooked grasping claws. It can grow up to 40 meters in length, mostly made up of hypersensitive tail tissue that detects movement. While hunting, the colo uses chin lures to attract prey, then screams with special organs in its throat to sonically stun prey. The colo can then dislocate its jaws to swallow oversized food. Once ingested, weak stomach acids and poison assist in the stupefaction of live prey.

=== Corellian sand panther ===
Corellian sand panthers are large, predatory felines native to Corellia. They have venomous claws used to weaken their prey, the venom of which is odorless and tasteless. Though illegal, sand panthers are often hunted by poachers for their prized fur and poisonous venom.

=== Coruscani ogre ===
The Coruscani ogre is a large sentient ogre that wanders the lower levels of Coruscant. They have hard gray skin, pointed ears and very sharp teeth. These beasts feed off the flesh of other creatures.

=== Cracian thumper ===
The Cracian Thumper is a widely used bipedal beast of burden used on human-populated worlds throughout the galaxy. It is named for the sound it doesn't make, as it makes very little sound while running. It is a central component of the Rebel Alliance's program of live mount scouting, and Cracian Thumper racing is a popular sport.

=== Crab glider ===
Crab gliders are small, carrion eating crab-like creatures native to the planet of Bespin. Patches of skin between their six legs allow them to glide around their home planet, feeding on the corpses of Beldons, giant air jellyfish. It is presumed that they keep from falling by catching updrafts from below.

=== Croator ===
The croator, a creature native to Wyndigal II, a planet with extreme ultraviolet radiation exposure, is an asexual, flightless avian-like creature with reflective plumage and an unusually long proboscis, used to inhale tiny fish and insects for food. Travelers on Wyndigal II often use croator plumage as anti-radiation protection.

=== Cthon ===
The cthon is a zombie-like sentient humanoid that is believed to have evolved from another humanoid creature. Like the ogre, it feeds off the flesh of others. It has huge ears, enabling it to find its way around the perpetually dark Coruscant underlevels, but no eyes, as it has no use for them. Cthons live in small groups and attack the unwary, trapping them with electro nets and devouring them. They appeared in the novel Darth Maul: Shadow Hunter.

=== Cy'een ===
Cy'een are huge long-necked reptilian fish that are native to the oceans of the planet Chad.

== D ==
=== Dashta eel ===
Dashta eels are a species native to Ord Cestus with the ability to use the Force. They were the biological part of the JK-13 droid.

=== Dactillion ===
Dactillions are four-legged lizard-like creatures with wings and a two part beak that fly the skies of Utapau.

=== Danchaf ===
Danchafs, also known as "tree goblins" by the native sentient Jenet species on the planet Garban, these arboreal creatures are ferocious pack carnivores that attack unwary travelers in Garban's forests, and can grow up to 2 m (6.5 ft) tall.

=== Derkolo ===
Derkolo are a sentient species native to the planet Sileron.

=== Dewback ===
Dewbacks or Dewback lizards are large reptilian creatures native to Tatooine. They are commonly used as beasts of burden by moisture farmers. They have been described as resembling a t-rex pretending to be a camel. They move slowly at night, but are known to run at a brisk pace for short distances during the day. Both Imperial stormtroopers and Jawas have been known to utilize these large beasts. Dewbacks can be seen in video games, the movie Star Wars Episode IV: A New Hope and the series The Mandalorian.

=== Dianoga ===
Dianogas, also known as garbage squids, are large, highly adaptable cephalopods capable of growing up to 10 m (32.8 ft) in length. They have a spherical body, seven tentacles, a mouth of inward-pointing teeth, and one big eye on a stalk. They came from the swamps of planet Vodran, but can now be found in many watery trash or sewage disposals on any planet in the galaxy, living off of any present organic matter. They are mostly scavengers, and only strike living creatures when frightened or starving. Dianogas are now considered sentient beings, as seen in the new canon short story The Baptist.

=== Draagax ===
Draagax are pack hunters that hunt in the equatorial grasslands of the planet Relkass. Apart from hunting small rodents, these animals also consume wild sentinel plants. When the plants bloom in the dry season, they give the draagax a narcotic that leads them to become frenzied, striking everything in their path.

=== Condor Dragon ===
==== Condor dragon ====
Condor dragons are flying reptiles from the forest moon of Endor. They have excellent eyesight and massive fangs for tearing through even the thickest hides. They have a wingspan of approximately 3 m (9.8 ft). They are known to eat Ewoks. They make nests in caves and eat the giant cave spiders.

==== Dragon snake ====
Dragon snakes are long, ferocious creatures, native to the swamps of Dagobah and Nal Hutta.

==== Hssiss ====
Hssiss, or dark side dragons are large, dark gray, reptilian creatures that originated on Stenness. They were corrupted by the planet's dark side aura, and domesticated by the Sith. They have the ability to become almost invisible, making them extremely dangerous to the unwary.

==== Kell dragon ====
Kell dragons are the slightly stockier relatives of the krayt dragon. While not heavily mentioned in the original Star Wars movies, they featured significantly in the first two installments of the Dark Forces series of games. Huge and powerful, they rival rancors in their ferocity and, as such, are favored by wealthy crime lords such as the Hutts.

==== Krayt dragon ====
Krayt dragons are big, carnivorous, terrestrial reptiles native to the planet of Tatooine. Their digestive tracts contain multiple chambers, in which mineral deposits may become gems known as 'Krayt Dragon Pearls', sold for high prices. Smuggler Hu Wanio became known as the "Kraytcutter" on Sullust from his specialty of dealing in Krayt dragon stomachs on the black market. The Krayt dragons have two known subspecies:

- Canyon Krayt Dragons live in the rocky caves and canyons of Tatooine's safari ranges. 10 m (33 ft) tall and 30 m (98 ft) long, the canyon krayt represents the smallest of the krayt subspecies. An evolved hunter, the four-legged canyon krayt has a yellow-brown camouflage skin pattern, a five-horned crown ridge, a face armored with dermal bone plates, and a spike-studded tail. They usually feed on Somp rats, Eopies, and lone Banthas.
- Greater Krayt Dragons are rare subspecies of the krayt dragon on Tatooine, measuring up to 100 meters in length, have 10 legs and blue scales, and feed on anything but mostly Banthas, or on seldom occasions a Sarlacc. C-3PO passes by a juvenile's skeleton in A New Hope. This prop was reportedly still in place when the crew of Attack of the Clones went there to film.

A member of an unnamed subspecies of Krayt dragon with sixteen limbs and bony armor covering its body appeared in the episode of The Mandalorian titled "Chapter 9: The Marshal".

=== Drexl ===
Drexl are big creatures that are usually green, and have teeth the size of human arms. They are native to Onderon. The adult form can fly, and is used as a means of transport and defense by the planet's Beast-riders. Drexl larvae are unable to fly, but are strong and extremely wild. They appear in Star Wars: Knights of the Old Republic II: The Sith Lords.

=== Duracrete slug ===
Having been spread throughout the galaxy by freighters and cargo ships, Duracrete slugs dig tunnels into building foundations and feed off of the concrete in there. Some specimens have been known to reach 10 m (32.8 ft) in length. They can consume almost any kind of concrete because the parts they cannot digest are excreted into armor nodules on their bodies.

=== Dweebit ===
The dweebit is a small, reddish-brown beetle, native to the Yuuzhan Vong galaxy. Dweebits have been used as weapons. When they were put onto Belkadan, they emitted extremely noxious fumes that made the planet uninhabitable.

== E ==
=== Eopie ===
Eopies are 1.75-meter-tall (5.7 ft) herbivores native to the planet Tatooine, appearing in all three prequel movies, (Star Wars: Galactic Battlegrounds and Star Wars Galaxies also feature Eopies). The quadruped mammals are distinguished by their pale skin and long flexible snouts. An eopies's pale, white skin helps keep the creature cool by reflecting the intense sunlight of the planet's twin suns. Eopies are used as beasts of burden due to their endurance and ability to carry a lot of cargo. They are known for being stubborn and querulous creatures and for having incredibly potent flatulence. Eopies reach maturity around six standard years of age and their average lifespan is 90 standard years.

== F ==
=== Fabool ===
Fabools are balloon-like creatures. They are sometimes punctured by thorny Blba trees and eaten by carnivorous snails. They live in the Dantarian Savannahs on Dantooine.

=== Falleen ===
Falleens are sentient reptilian beings that can emit pheromones that can affect many species.

=== Falumpaset ===
The Falumpaset is a big mammal native to Naboo, appearing in Star Wars: Episode I – The Phantom Menace, The Gungan Frontier, Star Wars: Galactic Battlegrounds, and Star Wars Galaxies: The Ruins of Dantooine. They roamed the plains and swamps of the planet in big herds, and their distinctive call could be heard for kilometers around. Easily domesticated, falumpasets were popular mounts all over the galaxy.

=== Fambaa ===
Fambaas are the largest terrestrial herbivores of the Naboo swamp, appearing in Star Wars: Episode I – The Phantom Menace, The Gungan Frontier, Star Wars Galaxies, Star Wars: Battlefront, and Star Wars: Galactic Battlegrounds. Fambaas are technically amphibians but have the scaly hide of reptiles. These creatures can easily knock over trees to get at leaves and berries. They also forage for underwater plants.

Fambaas in the wild travel in herds of up to 12. They are born with moist skin and gills and upon maturity their tails grow, the gills disappear and their skin hardens. The Fambaa has been domesticated by Gungan for millennia as beasts of burden and cavalry/artillery draft beasts.

=== Fathier ===
Fathiers, or space horses, appears in Star Wars: The Last Jedi. These horse-like animals are seen in the coastal city Canto Bight on the desert planet Cantonica. They are a sentient species that could be tamed and used for riding. They were known to be graceful and majestic, while being prized for their speed by the wealthy of the galaxy. The inhabitants of Canto Bight exploited them in competitive and highly popular races on the planet's racetracks.

=== Felucian ground beetle ===
Felucian ground beetles, also known as gelagrubs, are big insects that live on planet Felucia.

=== Fenner's Rock ===
Fenner's Rocks are harmless, slow-moving creatures that consume lichen, moss and algae. Their bodies resemble rocks and can be stationary for a long time. They have great big jaws that can suddenly open and sometimes shoot a piercing screech, scaring away unwary passers-by.

=== Fern bicker ===
Fern bickers are ape-like creatures that live on Kashyyyk. They are mostly solitary creatures.

=== Firaxan shark ===
Alien Firaxan sharks live on the ocean planet of Manaan. They appeared in Star Wars: Knights of the Old Republic.

=== Forntarch ===
Forntarchs are carnivorous, predatory rodents on the planet Gorsh, who await their prey in trees, and then leap down and impale them with razor-sharp forelimbs.

=== Frog-dog ===
Frog-dogs are sentient reptiles with traits of both frogs and dogs. Their diet is carnivorous, and they use their long tongues to grasp prey. Jabba the Hutt kept a frog-dog named Buboicullaar as a pet.

=== Fynock ===
Fynocks are avian creatures that can be kept as pets. They look like exotic birds with snake tails. Fynocks live on Talus. They do not have appendages besides their wings and they have large suckers on their faces.

=== Fyrnock ===
Fyrnocks are predatory quadrupeds that live on Anaxes. They are unable to walk in sunlight.

== G ==
=== Galoomp ===
Galoomps are herbivorous reptile-like creatures, (though actually mammals) native to Tatooine. They resemble long-legged armadillos with ankylosaur-like tails. The galoomps get their name from the unique sound they make when foraging for food. The galoomps use their slit nostrils and their large lungs to breathe when they are completely covered in sand.

=== Ganjuko ===
Ganjuko are massive, furred predators found predominantly on planets in the Filve sector and Bothan worlds, and can grow more than 3.5 m (11.5 ft) tall and 5 m (16.4 ft) long. Despite their 600 kg (1,320 lb) mass, they can outrun most humans in a sprint. They are protected by thick external skull plates and beaks, reinforced by thick layers of cartilage, and finally covered over all parts of their body except on its head by thick fur.

=== Garral ===
Garrals are wolf-like creatures that live in the forests of Wayland and Cholganna.

=== Gartro ===
Gartros are small, avian creatures that live on Coruscant. They have bat-like wings, spiked tails, and jaws filled with sharp teeth. Gatros are omnivorous and completely harmless.

=== Geejaw ===
Geejaws are leathery-winged bird creatures that live on Naboo and the forest moon of Endor.

=== Ghest ===
Ghests are large reptilian predators from the bayous of Rodia, and they are entrenched in the mythology of the planet. Ghests are often portrayed as demons in modern Rodian fiction. They slink underwater quietly in wait and then surprise their prey by attacking and devouring them in a single pounce.

=== Gizka ===
Gizka are small, frog-like creatures that adapt to almost any environment very swiftly, and reproduce just as quickly. Their first appearance was in the Star Wars: Knights of the Old Republic video game.

=== Goffbird ===
A large, purple pterodactyl-like creature with a wingspan of 100 m, native to Naboo. There are large feathers on its chest, which the Gungans use. It is believed to have a large opening beneath its throat, that emits a secretion with a reddish color to attract other Goffbirds. They are also called titavians.

=== Gornt ===
The gornt is a quadrupedal omnivore native to the planet Hethar. It is bred as a domesticated herd animal on numerous planets, primarily for its nutritious meat.

=== Gorg ===
Gorgs are frog-like creatures that are domestically farmed on Tatooine.

=== Gorog ===
A huge, mammoth animal resembling an ape. The Gorog is a mythical creature used in an underground arena on Cato Neimodia. The Gorog can be about 700 meters tall. The creature is native to Cato Neimodia and walks like a gorilla, with numerous bones and horns sprouting from its head. The creature is massive, and has two hearts, which makes it difficult to kill. The Gorog appears in Star Wars The Force Unleashed II.

=== Graiveh ===
Graivehs originate from the planet Ealor, and are dangerous bipedal predators that are considered "pre-sentients" by the scientists of the Galactic Empire, as they seem to almost achieve sentience. They grow up to 2.5 m (8.2 ft) tall and possess great eyesight.

=== Graul ===
Grauls originate from the planet Dantooine and walk like gorillas. Their colors range from green to reddish orange and are about the size of rancors.

=== Grazer ===
Grazers are fat animals with spikes on their backs and large udders. They live on Alderaan, Gestron, and Haruun Kal.

=== Great oopik ===
Great oopiks, flightless creatures from the planet Paramatan with vestigial wings, seem to be the evolutionary link between reptiles and avians. They also use echolocation to seek their food and stun them with powerful ultrasonic waves emitted from their throat sacs. They also possess a sac below their backs. This lethal sac emits a toxic odor when stimulated.

=== Greysor ===
Greysors are monkey-like creatures that live on Naboo, Mimban and Cholganna. Gungans are known to keep them as pets.

=== Grotseth ===
Grotseths are dangerous predatory fish on the ocean planet Baralou. They hunt in packs, grow up to 4 m (13.1 ft) in length and are covered in many small razor-sharp shells.

=== Gualamas ===
Gualamas are docile and swift quadrupeds native to Naboo. They are seen usually in herds, are white with long, swinging tails, and horns atop their heads. They are smaller relatives of gualaras.

=== Gullipuds ===
Gullipuds are self-inflating creatures, used in gullipud ball games on planets like Naboo, Manaan, Selonia and Drall.

=== Gundark ===
Gundarks are large, long-eared primates, native to the jungle planet of Poiu-Trewq. Surprisingly solitary for primates, they are noted for both their great strength and their fierce tempers.

An aquatic variety could be found on Yavin 4, stalking the shallows of streams and lakes for runyips and whisper birds. It has multiple sets of eyes to allow simultaneous vision above and below the water.

== H ==
=== Hanadaks ===
Hanadaks are like a cross between a baboon and a bear. They hibernate during the winters on Hok and have a fierce temper.

=== Hawk-bat ===
Hawk-bats are purple or red creatures with a curved beak and leathery wings. They can be found on civilized worlds like Coruscant and Taris.

=== Hoska ===
Hoska are grazers herd beasts living on the plains of the planet Essowyn, and are primary source of food for the Saurton, the local sentient species.

=== Howlers ===
Howlers are carnivorous, reptilian quadrupeds that may be native to Yavin 4. They attack prey mainly by lunging and clawing, but they do have an ear-splitting howl that they use to stun prey. They make an appearance on the video game Jedi Academy.

== I ==
=== Ishi Tib ===
Ishi Tib are an amphibious species native to Tibrin.

=== Ikopi ===
Ikopis are fleet-footed ungulates that live on the plains of Naboo.

=== Iriazes ===
Iriazes are bipedal ungulates with one horn, a long kangaroo-like tail and brown fur. They live on Muunilinst and Dantooine.

== J ==
=== Jyykle vulture ===
Jyykle vultures are solitary creatures that live on Mimban and Kashyyyk. They are extremely temperamental and often attack without warning.

== K ==
=== Kaadu ===
Kaadu are big, flightless, billed waterfowl-like creatures that live in the swamps of the planet Naboo and were used by Gungans as mounts.

=== Kalaks ===
Kalaks are large and very stupid reptilian creatures that stand 2.35 m (7.7 ft) tall. They live on Mobus and have a tough hide, thereby making them difficult to hunt.

=== Kath hound ===
Kath hounds are horned, wolf-like creatures native to Dantooine. There are two variants: the smaller one is orange and white with two horns; the larger is brown overall with three large horns. This latter variant is also called a "bull kath hound".

=== Kimogila ===
Kimogila are large, vicious lizards from Lok. They resemble the Krayt Dragons of Tatooine with some distinct aesthetic differences including its bulkier build and its lack of floppy ears. Kimogila (or "kimos") are generally a dark green color with rows of horns running from nose to tail. They are very aggressive and trophies, though rare, are made of their skulls.

=== Kkryytch ===
Kkryytch are avian creatures that eat seeds and live on Kashyyyk.

=== K'lor slugs ===
K'lor slugs are large worm-like creatures native to the Sith Homeworld of Korriban, and inhabit the tombs of the Sith lords, and prey on anything that attempts to plunder the tombs, from archeologists to Sith Acolytes. They are also found on several other worlds. For example: A massive K'lor Slug is found on Taris. They appear in Star Wars: The Old Republic

=== Koriena ===
Koriena are striped canines that hunt in packs and are similar to wolves.

=== Kouhun ===
Kouhun are centipede-like creatures with stingers and teeth. They live on Mimban and Indoumodo. A subspecies of big kouhun live in the swamps of Naboo that shoot poison puffs at their prey.

=== Kowakian monkey-lizards ===
Kowakian monkey-lizards are small, hairy creatures with wide ears, bills and tails, and stand approximately two feet (60 cm) tall. They are small, semi-intelligent creatures from the planet Kowak.

=== Krakanas ===
Krakanas are aquatic creatures that live on Mon Calamari. They look like big octopuses, in that they have many tentacles; however, each tentacle ends in a big sharp claw.

=== Krykna ===
Krykna are large, pale-white six-legged arachnoid arthropods native to the planet Atollon, large enough to be aggressively dangerous to humans, but repelled by sensor marker technology. These spiders closely resemble the Knobby White Spider (above) from the planet Dagoba. They can be found in chapter ten of The Mandalorian.

=== Kybuck ===
Kybucks are fast ungulates that live in the grasslands of Kashyyyk. These swift mammals use the tall grasses of their native grasslands to hide from would-be predators, although they are capable of outrunning most predators anyway, being able to do magnificent acrobatic jumps while running up to 90 kilometers per hour. Male Kybucks have short horns on the top of their heads, and sundry species can be told apart by their horns.

=== Kyren ===
The kyren is a small herbivorous insect from Ansion that travels in swarms of up to 150 million individuals. They have no legs, and spend most of their lives airborne, feeding on the wide grasslands of Ansion.

== L ==
=== Laa ===
Laas are fish, resembling angler fish. Laas live in Naboo's swamps.

=== Laigrek ===
Laigreks are large arachnids from the planet Dantooine. They like dank, dark areas and took up residence in the ruins of the Dantooine Jedi Enclave after it was bombarded by Darth Malak in the Jedi Civil War. Their bite is painful, but not venomous.

=== Lava flea ===
Lava fleas are a species of hard shelled arthropod. The Mustafar lava flea has been domesticated by the native Mustafarians who use it in their large industry of mining the various metals dissolved in the plentiful lava on their planet.

=== Lepi ===
The lepi are an omnivorous humanoid species, resembling anthropomorphic rabbits, with large incisors, long ears, lanky frames, and big feet. Lepi are covered in short fur that varies in color from green to dark blue. They possess a heightened metabolism such that they are always in motion, giving some an air of fidgetiness. Lepi developed and pursued stellar travel in response to over crowding on their homeworld Coachelle Prime.

=== Loper ===
Lopers are small, opossum-like rodents from the fourth moon of Yavin. They are readily identified by their luxurious red fur, sharp teeth and claws, and hairless, bone-plated tail that ends in wicked barbs. Though nasty when cornered, Lopers will tend to avoid conflict with larger creatures.

=== Loth-wolf ===
The Loth-wolf is a near-legendary, Force-sensitive large canid native to Lothal, known since prehistoric times on that world by its inhabitants. A white-furred one occasionally assisted Ezra Bridger on Lothal in the Star Wars Rebels TV series.

=== Lylek ===
The Lylek is the most dangerous predator on the planet of Ryloth. It is one of the few creatures that is able to survive in the Bright Lands. Lyleks are tall beasts that are protected by a thick exoskeleton. They are armed with sharp, spear-footed limbs, powerful jaws, and overpowering tentacles. Lyleks are fierce and prey on each other when there is no other food available. In addition to their viciousness and strength, their tail tentacle is also tipped with a poisonous barb. The poison is not deadly, but it is strong enough to disable most creatures so they do not escape. Lyleks are also known for crawling into inhabited caves and threatening city dwellers.

== M ==
=== Malia ===
Malia are swift creatures living in dens on the surface of Ragoon 6, marked by blue-gray fur, long tapered snouts, and a triple row of yellow teeth. They are fearsome fighters, especially during the night when they do their hunting and are most active.

=== Maramu ===
Maramu, a cross between a kangaroo and a sheep, live in the mountains of Genesia and Cholganna, they are also native to the forest moon of Endor.

=== Massiff ===
Massiffs are creatures that can be found across the galaxy, including Geonosis and Tatooine. They are used as pets and guards. They are often found living with tusken raiders. In The Mandalorian chapter 9, the Mandalorian uses tusken to speak with them.

=== Minstyngar ===
Minstyngars are insects that live in troops on Kashyyyk and Mimban.

=== Mogo ===
Mogos are camel-like creatures with ten legs that inhabit the planet Roon; the mogo's shaggy fur keeps it warm in the mountains. Mogos can be used for transportation and food, and their fur is used for clothing.

=== Mott ===
Motts are strong, horned mammals that live on Naboo and Mimban. They look like a cross between a rhinoceros and a hippopotamus with orange-tan, white-striped hides, motts are easily domesticated.

=== Mouf ===
Moufs are medium-sized, solitary creatures that often get together to feed or mate. They look similar to bears.

=== Mutriok ===
The mutriok is a four-legged creature found on Socorro. It is often preyed on by the tra'cor.

=== Mygeetoan yaks ===
Mygeetoan yaks are white yak-like creatures that live on Mygeeto.

=== Mynock ===
A mynock is a leathery-looking silicon-based organism that grows up to 1.6 m (5.25 ft) long, with a wingspan of up to 1.25 m (4.1 ft), and that feeds on electrical energy. They are often found leeching power from spacecraft, as mynocks are one of the few species capable of living in the vacuum of space, feeding on stellar radiation, silicon and other minerals from asteroids and other space debris. Mynocks' bat-like wings also allow them to fly in the atmosphere. Found across the galaxy (having spread prolifically from their original system), mynocks tend to flock together, migrating annually in large groups. The most notable of these events are the migrations of Roon, during which the sky darkens from swarms of these creatures. First seen in The Empire Strikes Back feeding on the Millennium Falcon.

The vynock was a leathery, winged subspecies of the mynock native to the planet Kalarba.

== N ==
=== Neebray ===
Neebray are giant manta ray-like creatures that first appeared in the Clone Wars TV series. They live in the vacuum of space, use nebulas as breeding grounds and they have been found on planets such as the coral moon of Rugosa and the moon of Rishi.

=== Neks ===
Neks are dog-like creatures, with three large claws to every paw and large teeth. They are classically called "Battle Dogs" and are bred in the Cyborrean system for sale on the Galactic Black Market. These huge and vicious creatures are sometimes fitted with armor plating and special simulators calls "Attack Simulators" for either sparring for dueling.

=== Nerf ===
Nerfs are fur-covered, smelly, cow-like creatures with dull horns protruding from their heads. They are raised for their delicious meat on Alderaan and other planets. The word "nerf" was first used in The Empire Strikes Back (1980), when Princess Leia calls Han Solo a "nerf herder" as an insult. Nerf herders on Alderaan are known for their poor hygiene.

=== Nexu ===
Nexus are felines from the planet of Cholganna. Nexus possess tooth-filled jaws that cover most of their spade-shaped heads. They are covered in tan-brown fur, which helps them blend into the background of their native prairies. The stripes also aid in hiding out in the rainforest brush. The four-legged carnivores have four eyes also, as the second set, situated next to the first, can see in infrared to find hidden prey. They also feature a split-ended tail, covered underneath with two rows of suction cups used to climb and swing from tree to tree in their forest home. A Nexu was seen as an 'Arena Beast' in Attack of the Clones. Padmé Amidala was also attacked by the nexu in the arena on Geonosis before it was killed by a Reek. Nexu can be trained to act as guards or pets. Allana Djo Solo owned a nexu named Anji.

=== Night Beast ===
The Night Beast is a fictional monster from the Star Wars Saga as well as a movie by American film maker Don Dohler.

After the Massassi had departed from the planet Yavin IV, they left behind a creature known only as The Night Beast to guard and protect their homeworld against anybody who might seek to take it over until they eventually returned. Its skin is leathery and is murky green in color, and has slightly aquatic facial features such as large fish-like lips that are filled with enormous teeth. It is a bipedal life form whose feet and hands end with gigantic, devastating claws and it possesses great strength.

=== Nudj ===
Nudj are swamp lizards, similar to chameleons. They are native to the swamps of Dagobah.

=== Nuna ===
The Nuna are gamebirds from Naboo, who can be seen living around the Lianorm Swamp. A dwarf species existed, the adult of which was the same size as a chick of the common species. The Nuna is also found on Tatooine, notably around Mos Espa. The Naboo Nuna is socially aggressive, if one is attacked then nearby Nuna will attack the aggressor. The Tatooine Nuna is mostly non-aggressive and as a result is farmed in large numbers by local hunters.

== O ==
=== Oggdo ===
Oggdos are big frog-like creatures that are found on the planet Bogano. The more powerful subspecies Oggdo Bogdo was also found strictly on Bogano. They appeared in Jedi: Fallen Order.

=== Opee Sea Killer ===
Opee sea killers are big aquatic carnivorous anglerfish-like sea creatures that live in the planet core of Naboo. They are approximately twenty meters in length and hybrids of both crustaceans and fish. The creatures have two pectoral guidance fins, six crablike legs in the back, two antennas, bouncy eyes, and very great jaws with big prehensile tongues within them.

=== Orbalisk ===
Orbalisks are oyster-like creatures, native to the Beast Moon of Dxun. They are parasites that cling to the skin of their host. They feed on Dark Side Energy. They pump chemicals into the blood that increase anger. When killed they pump toxins into the host. They appeared in Darth Bane: The Rule of Two.

=== Orray ===
Orrays are very aggressive crocodile-like creatures that have been marked out as having a build like a horse.

=== Oslet ===
Oslets are 3 m (9.8 ft) tall, shy creatures that live in the jungles of the planet Joralla. They are also used as mounts and nest high up in the sio trees.

== P ==
=== Peko peko ===
Peko pekos are reptile-avians with purple feathers, native to the swampy regions of Naboo. They are capable mimics, and are often kept as pets.

=== Pharple ===
Pharple are a small to medium-sized game bird found on Lok.

=== Pikobi ===
Pikobis are dinosaur-like creatures that live in the swamps of Naboo.

=== Profogg ===
Profoggs are little creatures resembling prairie dogs, that live on Tatooine.

=== Porg ===
Porgs are species of orange, black and white bill-less Seabirds, which are small puffin-like creatures which inhabit the fictional planet of Ahch-To. While shooting scenes of Star Wars: The Last Jedi, on the island Malin Head, Ireland, there were large colonies of Atlantic puffins. Instead of removing the puffins using VFX, they decided to change them to porgs.

Porgs are a penguin or puffin-like creatures with faces akin to seals. They are native to the planet Ahch-To, where Jedi Master Luke Skywalker made his exile in the years following the victory over the Galactic Empire. They are introduced in The Last Jedi and are known for how "insanely cute" they are, serving as comic relief. The creatures, who dwell on the cliffs of the island where Skywalker lives in exile, could build nests and fly. Male porgs are known to be slightly bigger in size than females; baby porgs are called porglets. A flock of porgs is known as a murder. During The Last Jedi, one porg finds its way aboard the Millennium Falcon with Chewbacca; they serve as a foil for the Wookiee. A porg also appears in The Rise of Skywalker when Rey travels to Ahch-To.

The introduction of the porgs was somewhat controversial, with some critics claiming the creatures were introduced to cater to children and boost merchandise sales. However, the production team has stated that the porgs were made to account for the puffins in the background of outdoor shots set on Ahch-To. Puffins are native to the Skellig Islands, which served as the filming location of Ahch-To, and local conservation laws forbade the filmmakers from taking actions that would keep the puffins out of frame. They either had to digitally get rid of the puffins from the shots or modify them as something else to maintain continuity. Modifying the puffins proved technically easier and cheaper than removing them, which led to the making of the porgs. The porgs' voices were created through a mixture of sounds from turkeys, chickens, and doves.

=== Pug jumper ===
Pug jumpers are hard exoskeletal creatures that live on Kashyyyk.

=== Purrgil ===
Purrgil, also called star whales, are big, whale-like spacefaring creatures with multiple tentacles, introduced in the 2016 Star Wars Rebels episode "The Call". They are a migratory species capable of faster-than-light hyperspace travel without technology, with whom Ezra Bridger is able to communicate using the Force. In the 2018 series finale "Family Reunion – and Farewell", Ezra summons the purrgil to destroy Grand Admiral Thrawn's attacking fleet. The purrgil then grab Thrawn's flagship and prepare to drag it into hyperspace to an unknown destination, taking Ezra with it.

The purrgil reappear in the 2023 Ahsoka episode "Part Three: Time to Fly", as the Jedi Ahsoka Tano, her apprentice Sabine Wren and their droid Huyang encounter a pod of them over the planet Seatos. In "Part Five: Shadow Warrior", Ahsoka and Huyamg use the purrgil to follow Thrawn's minions, who have taken Sabine and traveled to Thrawn's location in another, far away galaxy using a coded star map and a massive hyperspace ring. They arrive on the planet Peridea, where the purrgil typically go to die, in "Part Six: Far, Far Away".

=== Pylat bird ===
Pylat birds are pretty, white-and-black cockatiel-like creatures that inhabit Neimoidia and are a token of their owner's wealth.

== R ==
=== Rainbow gem ===
Rainbow gems are silicon-based lifeforms from the planet Gallinore. They radiate a colorful shine that stems from their inner light, after reaching maturity at a few thousand years old. They are considered valuable, as one is worth the price of a Mon Calamari cruiser.

=== Rakghoul ===
The Rakghoul is the result of a Sith bioweapon, turning beings into mindless mutants. Rakghoul infection can be transferred by contact with one. The original outbreak occurred on the planet Taris, where they plagued the inhabitants of the Undercity – criminals or their descendants – but they also live on Coruscant. First appeared in Star Wars: Knights of the Old Republic.

=== Rancor ===
The rancor is an immense, warm-blooded predator native to Dathomir, Lehon, and Felucia. They vary wildly in color and appearance; basic shared features are stocky bodies, short legs, ground-brushing long arms, a lipless mouth exposing huge fangs, and tiny eyes. The first rancor in the franchise appeared in Return of the Jedi; Jabba the Hutt kept it imprisoned beneath his palace, using it as a method of executing prisoners, until it was killed by Luke Skywalker. In The Book of Boba Fett series, the titular character is gifted a tamed rancor, which he keeps as a pet and later rides into battle. The former owner explains that rancors form strong, loving bonds with owners who treat them well. Various rancors have also appeared in many books, comics, and video games related to the franchise, appearing in some media as native wildlife, and in other media as trained creatures of battle, used by both good and bad characters.

=== Rat ===
==== Jakrab ====
Jakrabs are hare-like rodents native to Tatooine.

==== Womp rat ====
A womp rat is a slow-moving rodential creature, often found scavenging in packs at the bottom of canyons. They are one of the most vile creatures native to Tatooine. They are covered in short fur that is usually yellow or tan and look through garbage and waste dumps for meals. Due to exposure to radioactive waste and chemicals, womp rats can mutate into larger beasts, with larger jaws, long, whip-like tails, and even an infectious disease-causing saliva. According to Luke Skywalker in Star Wars, they attain approximately two meters in length.

=== Rathtar ===
A rathtar is a large, carnivorous creature resembling a giant octopus, with razor sharp teeth, multiple tentacles, and numerous eyes. Introduced in Star Wars: The Force Awakens (2015), they are pack hunters.

=== Reek ===
The reeks are large quadrupedal rhino-like mammals native to the plains of Ylesia in Hutt space, often bred on ranches on that world's Codian Moon. Large tusks protrude from their cheeks, which they use for headlocks in contests for dominance among their own kind. One central horn is used to attack an opponent head-on. While they are herbivores by nature, they are often fed meat to make them vicious and are then used for exhibition sport as execution animals. A reek was seen as an 'Arena Beast' in Attack of the Clones. The reeks resemble Scutosauruses.

=== Rock worrt ===
Rock worrts are orange insects found on many planets. Their bite delivers a combination poison and neurotoxin to their victim, which is then used as an incubator for up to 20 eggs.

=== Ro-roo ===
Ro-roos are lemur-like creatures that live on Kashyyyk and Mimban.

=== Rong boar ===
Rong boars are pig-like creatures that lived in the planet Mimban.

=== Ronto ===
Rontos are large, four-legged creatures that are beasts of burden utilized by the Jawas of Tatooine. They appear in Star Wars: Knights of the Old Republic, Star Wars: Episode I – The Phantom Menace (and video game adaptation), Star Wars Empire: Darklighter, Star Wars Galaxies, Star Wars Episode IV: A New Hope (Special Edition), A Hunter's Fate: Greedo's Tale, and Shards of Alderaan.

Like the native dewbacks of Tatooine, rontos are easy to train and become quite fond of their masters. Rontos have superb senses of hearing and smell, contrasting with their poor vision, which is why they are startled by sudden movements.

=== Rugger ===
Ruggers are small, furry rodents, found on the forest moon of Endor.

=== Roggwart ===
Roggwarts are large, predatory beasts with long tails, curved horns, and tough thick skin. This is the creature General Grievous kept as a pet in episode ten "Lair of Grievous", season one of Star Wars: The Clone Wars, an animated cartoon series from 2008. General Grievous would then name his pet roggwart "Gor". Gor would then live in Grievous's castle on the third moon of the planet Vassek. Gor would devour any unintended guests for the rest of his life, until Gor would be slain by Kit Fisto in episode ten, season one of the Clone Wars series.

== S ==
=== Sand Creature ===
Sand Creatures are monstrous worm-like creatures that do not seem to have a true name (though Kyle Katarn refers to them as "sand burrowers"). They tunnel under the ground quickly, and shoot up above ground mouth first to swallow prey. They are native to the desert planet Blenjeel, where Katarn's Jedi apprentice Jaden Korr evades them while searching for parts to repair his ship after a failed mission to rescue merchants that had crash-landed on the planet. They appear in the video game Star Wars: Jedi Knight: Jedi Academy, and are very clearly a nod to the sandworms from the Dune franchise.

=== Sando aqua monster ===
Sando aqua monsters are 200 m (656 ft) long aquatic mammals from Naboo. They are ravenous, deadly predators, eating everything including the opee sea killer and the colo claw fish.

=== Sarlacc ===
The sarlacc is an omnivorous, immobile beast, found on several planets, most notably Tatooine. The largest known member of the species resides on Felucia, and is several kilometers long. Jabba the Hutt used to toss his enemies into a sarlacc, which would then slowly digest them for a thousand years. Boba Fett is the only one known to survive the sarlacc. It consists of a single giant beak and many tentacles emerging from the depths of its pit as well as spike-like teeth that help snag onto prey's clothes "like barbed wire" long enough for the tentacles to grab it. They reproduced by spores, known as sarlacci, that traveled through space until they found another suitable planet to inhabit. After implanting itself into the ground, the sarlacci grew downward like a plant, forming a pit. The mouth and tentacles were the most visible parts of the sarlacc. The rest of the sarlacc's massive anatomical features were buried up to one hundred meters deep in the ground. This guaranteed protection of the sarlacc's vital organs and made it invulnerable to most forms of serious damage. Xenobiologists are unsure as to whether the sarlacc is animal or plant, as it possesses characteristics of both kingdoms. First appears in Return of the Jedi. They are mentioned in the Disney TV show The Mandalorian. In episode 9, a Krayt Dragon appears in an empty sarlacc pit. The first episode of The Book of Boba Fett shows a scene of Boba Fett inside the sarlacc's innards, as he breathes from a dead stormtrooper's respirator and escapes from the pit by blasting through with his flamethrower.

=== Scurrier ===
Scurriers are rat-like creatures from Tatooine. They travel in packs of around 30 members. Males can be distinguished from females by the horns which are small and straight compared to the larger, curled horns of the males.

=== Scyk ===
Scyks are reptilian lizards native to Tatooine. They appear in the video game Star Wars Galaxies.

=== Shaak ===
Shaaks are plump, pachydermal herd animals with enormous rears that jut into the air. They are native to the grasslands of Naboo, where they graze on flowers and grass. They are raised for meat. They can be found in the animated Disney TV show Star Wars: The Clone Wars.

=== Shyrack ===
Shyracks are bat-like creatures that inhabit the caves of Korriban. Shyracks are very dangerous pests, that often attack intruders in flocks.

=== Sketto ===
Skettos are flying reptiles, native to Tatooine. They are active at twilight and live off of the blood of large mammals, often traveling in large groups to overwhelm and feed on prey.

=== Slivilith ===
A slivilith is a large, green, amorphous creature that thrives off ambient energy and solar radiation in space. Sliviliths have a semi-discernible head with two glowing red eyes and two antenna stalks. The rear side of the body tapers off into a mass of tentacles. Sliviliths have membranous wings that can propel them through space or atmospheric environments.

=== Snarb ===
Snarbs are lizards with gray skin and 2 legs. They live on Mimban.

=== Sleen ===
Sleens are lizards native to Dagobah.

=== Spider ===
==== Kinrath ====
Kinrath are large, venomous arachnid-like creatures that live on Dantooine and Kashyyyk. They appear in Star Wars: Knights of the Old Republic and Star Wars: Knights of the Old Republic II: The Sith Lords.

==== Knobby White Spider ====
Knobby White Spiders are a bizarre organism of the Dagobah System: essentially the larvae stage of the gnarl tree, resembling a gigantic arachnid, which roams the swamps and devours animals, and eventually anchors itself to the ground and becomes a mature tree.

==== Shell Spider ====
Shell Spiders, as depicted in Darth Maul: Shadow Hunter, are known for their incredibly tough and durable silk, which was used to form dense armor plating for personal protection. When woven into a mat, shell spider silk could deflect a vibroblade as well as low-power beams and lasers.

==== Spice spider ====
Spice spiders, also called Energy Spiders, are arachnids, native to the mines of Kessel. Their excrement is the basis of the narcotic glitterstim. They are one of Han Solo's greatest fears, as he was chased by one in the Kessel Mines. About 9 years before the Clone Wars began, some of these spiders were brought to Ryloth and altered to produce the more potent narcotic "glitteryll".

==== Webweaver ====
Webweavers are arachnid creatures that live on Kashyyyk. They are the dominant species on the dark lower and ground levels of the forest planet, where they use their violent characteristics to thrive.

=== Splox ===
Splox are large crabs found on the surface of Bogano. They are oftentimes found in packs with Bog Rats.

=== Staga ===
Staga are used as herd animals on the planet Ambria. They have tufts of fur on their shoulders, but are otherwise reptilian-looking, with scales, horns and thick tails.

=== Stone Mite ===
Stone mites are scorpion-like creatures that cling to spaceships, consuming their hulls with a combination of strong jaws and acidic saliva. Three individual stone mites can merge to form an ambiotic triont that features a hard shell, strengthened by electrolytic reactions. These creatures have been suspected as the work of military genetic engineers. Stone mites can be found across the galaxy, including on Tatooine, Coruscant, Malastare and Naboo.

=== Storm beast ===
Storm Beasts are monsters that inhabit Malachor V.

=== Stratt ===
The stratt is a large reptilian beast that lives on Coruscant.

=== Suubatar ===
The suubatar is a riding beast, native to the grasslands of Ansion. Suubatars are 6 m (19.7 ft) tall, and can travel at an impressive speed on their six muscular legs. They are omnivores, and feed equally well on large fruit and small prey.

=== Swamp slug ===
Swamp slugs are large aquatic mollusks that live on the planet Dagobah.

== T ==
=== Tach ===
Tach are harmless monkey-like creatures that inhabit the Shadowlands on the planet Kashyyyk. During the Czerka occupation of Kashyyyk, tach were hunted by poachers for their glands, which were used as an additive in brewing a type of strong ale unique to the planet Taris.

=== Talortai ===
The Talortai are a mysterious, force sensitive race who are immune to aging. They are avian-humanoid in appearance but also have reptilian features. The Talortai are fierce warriors who hone their abilities using the force. Talortai also have the ability to regenerate any wounds.

Urai Fen in the game Star Wars: Empire at War: Forces of Corruption is the only Talortain seen in the Star Wars franchise.

=== Talz ===
The Talz were a sentient species native to the snowy planet Orto Plutonia. They were covered in thick, shaggy white fur and possessed 4 eyes and a small proboscis. During the Clone Wars, they lived a primitive lifestyle. A talz named Muftak can be seen in A New Hope.

=== Taozin ===
The taozin is a huge, completely transparent, insect-like beast, endemic to the moon of Va'art. It eats anything foolish enough to come near, which it traps by spitting a gluey fluid that becomes silk and entwines it.

=== Tauntaun ===
Tauntauns are 2.5 m (8.2 ft) tall bipedal snow reptiles, indigenous to the ice planet Hoth. Tauntauns superficially resemble a robust kangaroo, but are covered with white fur and have downturned horns, four nostrils, and a foul body odor. They graze on lichen, moss and fungi found in ice grottoes as a food source, as well as scavenging on frozen flesh or small rodents; their own meat is unfit for human consumption. They are used as mounts by the Rebel Alliance during their occupation of Echo Base. The tauntaun's thick layers of fat and fur provide adequate protection from the cold during the daytime, but it cannot survive exposure to the cold of night. Due to oil excreted from their skin, tauntauns give off a very unpleasant odor. They are the primary prey of the wampa.

The species was designed for The Empire Strikes Back (1980) by Ralph McQuarrie, Joe Johnston, and Phil Tippett. It was conceived early on as being more dinosaur-like, similar to the blurrg. Mechanical costumes were considered for shots featuring live-action actors, but were found to be unpractical. Instead, the creatures were primarily created via stop motion animation (including motion control) under Phil Tippett. Their animation was significant because of the use of go motion (making their motion more consistent with live action). A specimen is featured prominently on the film's theatrical poster. A mounted tauntaun head appears in Return of the Jedi (1983) next to Jabba the Hutt's favorite trophy, the frozen Han Solo.

=== Terecon ===
Predators on the planet Essowyn, terecons are reptiles, who attack by burrowing into the ground and leaping spectacularly upon their unsuspecting prey. They can grow up to 1 m (3.3 ft) tall and 8 m (26.2 ft) long.

=== Terentatek ===
A creature mentioned in the video game Star Wars: Knights of the Old Republic, presumably created by the Sith to kill Jedi. On the Jedi Academy on Dantooine, a Twi'lek Jedi teaches Revan about an event called 'The Great Hunt' where numerous Jedi were sent out to kill the creatures. In the game Terentateks are encountered in the Kashyyyk Shadow lands (it is referred to as 'the ritual beast'), in Naga Sadow's tomb on Korriban and the Shyrack Cave on Korriban. Terentateks feed on force adepts, and are found where the dark side thrives. Slow but powerful, Terentateks use their large claws to strike foes. Many Jedi have fallen to the dark side on their quest to rid the galaxy of these abominations.

=== Tesfli piercer ===
Tesfli piercers are tiny flying insects, who inhabit the dense swamps of the planet Gorsh and live in swarms. Although their bites are not lethal, they sometimes carry dangerous "rotting disease" that simulates gangrene.

=== Thernbee ===
Thernbees are fearsome beasts with psychic abilities, that live on Almania. They are hairy and have giant teeth and large claws, similar to a wolf or lion. They are generally quite playful creatures and are often kept as pets, though are also used as watchdogs. They possess numbing saliva.

=== Thevaxan marauder ===
An enormous reptilian predator on the planet Gorsh, the Thevaxan marauder is typically audible when approaching its prey, being a loud, dimwitted and clumsy beast. It can grow up to 20 m (65.6 ft) long and 8 m (26.2 ft) tall at the shoulder.

=== Thranta ===
Thrantas are a group of flying animals found on Alderaan, Bespin, and Coruscant. While there are multiple breeds varying in size and functions (some for personal travel, others for massive air ferries), most thrantas serve the purpose of aerial transport. The predominant physical feature of these creatures are their manta ray-like figure.

=== Torton ===
Tortons are red and green turtle-like creatures with long legs. They originated on Naboo's moon of Rori.

=== Tolibs ===
Tolibs are large swamp birds that live on the planet Mimban.

=== Tra'cor ===
The "Tra'cor" is an amphibious relative of the rancor. Like the rancor, it possessed a hostile temper, but is smaller than the rancor and almost completely water bound. The tra'cor will feed on moss and grasses growing underwater, but will also eat meat whenever it presents itself. These water creatures wait to ambush creatures that come to the water to have a drink. It is found on the planet Socorro and will also walk on land.

=== Treppok ===
Treppoks are enormous fish that grow up to 30 m (100 ft) long on the ocean planet of Baralou. They are the herd animals of the sentient species Krikthasi.

=== Tunnel snake ===
Tunnel snakes are poisonous snakes found in jungle regions of planets, such as Kashyyyk and Wayland.

=== Tuskcat ===
Tuskcats are tiger-like animals that live on Naboo and possibly other planets, such as Orto Plutonia. They had very long saber-tooth fangs, hence their name, and are also called "Nabooan Tusked Panthers" or Nabooan tusk-cat.

== U ==
=== Ubeba ===
Ubebas are simians, native to the planet Cholganna.

=== Ugja ===
Ugja are solitary creatures, native to the planet Cholganna.

=== Uller ===
Ullers are horned creatures that live on Kashyyyk.

=== Umgullian blob ===
The Umgullian blob is a pink, blobby creature, found on Shili and Mimban. They are most well known to be employed in the blob races on Umgul.

=== Unark ===
Unarks are small, acid-spitting worms that live on Coruscant.

=== Urusai ===
Urusais are reptavians (reptile and avian) native to Tatooine.

== V ==
=== Varactyl ===
Varactyls are lizard-like creatures with green scales and colored plumage on their necks. They are native to the planet Utapau. Their toes allow them to climb almost vertically. They seem to have the head of a bird and a body of a gecko, and their call is a short warble-type sound. A female one named Boga is ridden by Obi-Wan Kenobi in Star Wars: Episode III – Revenge of the Sith.

=== Veermok ===
Veermoks are guard creatures found on Naboo and Mimban. They resemble lanky, upright, and formidable gorillas. They are useful as guards because they are nearly immune to blaster fire. The Systech Weapons Corporation developed two extremely powerful blasters, the Systech Static Blaster and the Systech Electric Blaster, to counter, to counter its ferociousness.

=== Velker ===
Velker are star fighter shaped creatures found on the planet Bespin.

=== Vesp ===
Vesps are poisonous lizards that live on the planet Lok.

=== Vexis ===
Vexis are serpent-like creatures found on planet Pasaana that dwell primarily in caves existing without eyesight and detect prey by electromagnetic activity.

=== Voorpak ===
Voorpaks are small carnivores that look like balls of fur standing on stick-like legs. They are kept as pets. They can be found on Naboo.

=== Vornskr ===
Vornskrs are panther-like creatures that lived in the planet Myrkr. It possesses the unusual ability to hunt using the Force. They are wild, aggressive and vicious beasts. Size is approximated to be around 2–3 ft tall at the shoulder and 6–8 ft long. The voxyn race created by the Yuuzhan Vong to hunt and kill Jedi were a hybrid of the vornskr and the Yuuzhan Vong fero xyn.

=== Voxyn ===
Voyxn are large predatory creatures created by the Yuuzhan Vong. A hybrid of Myrkr origin Vornskr and Fero Xyn from the Yuuzahn Vong galaxy, they were created to hunt Jedi. Used by the Yuuzahn Vong they were force sensitive and soon became a nightmare to all Jedi. Abilities also included sonic blasts, flesh-melting acid, disease-coated claws, and a poisonous barbed tail.

=== Vulptex ===
Vulptices are fox-like animals, native to the mineral planet Crait. They live in caves under Crait's salt crust in groups called skulks. They are best known for their coats made of white crystalline bristles.

=== Vyp ===
Vyps are poisonous lizards that live on Cholganna.

== W ==
=== Wampa ===
Wampas are a horned, clawed, white-furred, carnivorous species of mammals native to the frozen world of Hoth. They are a semi-sentient race of predators standing over 2 m (6.6 ft) in height, subsisting in the cold climate by hunting tauntauns—their primary prey. Wampas are usually solitary creatures, but are known to occasionally hunt in packs. Their white fur allows wampas to blend-in with Hoth's blinding blizzards, enabling them to catch their prey completely unaware. Once they have made their kill, wampas drag the carcasses back to their icy lair, where they suspend them from the ceiling until ready to eat them. Due to the extreme temperatures of Hoth and the cold-blooded nature of the wampa, the creatures are difficult to track on radar. A similar species is believed to inhabit the planet Gall, in the Outer Rim.

The wampa made its first appearance in The Empire Strikes Back (1980), as a predator that attacks Luke and eats his tauntaun. Several other wampa sequences were planned for The Empire Strikes Back, but were ultimately cut. The wampa also made an appearance in the Family Guy special "Something, Something, Something, Dark Side" (2009), being depicted as Cookie Monster from Sesame Street.

==== Tatooine Howler ====
The Tatooine Howler, also commonly referred to as the Desert Wampa, is a native species of Tatooine that resembles the Wampas of the planet Hoth, despite having no genetic relation. They are intelligent and solitary creatures, hunting for prey on their own.

=== Wandrella ===
Wandrellas are 10–15 m (35–50 ft) long worms, found in the muddy plains of the jungle-covered planet Mimban. The wandrella's thoughts are primitive, and it often charges at its prey, using its armored belly to quickly move forward. This large beast has phosphorescent skin, streaked with brown, and has a cluster of several eyes on one end.

=== Woolamander ===
A woolamander is an ape-like animal native to Yavin IV. It has a blue furred body, a long, multi-colored tail, a prominent belly, and a multi-colored face. Its chief enemy is the syntaril.

=== Woodoo ===
Woodoos are carnivorous ground dwelling birds native to Tatooine.

=== Worm ===
==== Blenjeel Sand Worm ====
Gigantic carnivorous caterpillar-like creatures with round mouths filled with sharp teeth, inhabit the planet Blenjeel. The worms are blind, but can detect motion. They appear in the game Star Wars Jedi Knight: Jedi Academy. They are likely a reference to the sandworms from Dune.

==== Conduit worm ====
The conduit worm is a long worm that lives in the electrical wiring channels of underground Coruscant and thrives on the electrical currents sent through them. They may also be attracted to the electric activity in brains, if they do not find a stronger electrical power source to feed on. As such, many a person has awoken on Coruscant to find one of the worm's feelers creeping into their ears. The worms can end up on starships, causing power outages, and are treated as vermin.

==== Glim worm ====
Glim worms are tunneling 1 m (3.3 ft) long predators, found on many planets. They are covered by sharp, flexible scales that move to propel the worms through sand or soil at speeds up to 40 km/h (25 mph). They are also hunted for their skin for use as clothing, and their slime for use as adhesive.

==== Space slug ====
Space slugs, also called exogorths or giant asteroid worms, are silicon-based gastropods capable of surviving in near-vacuum conditions. Space slugs generally make their habitats in asteroids, where they spend the majority of their lives. Many space slugs have been found in Hoth's asteroid field, some reaching thousands of meters (feet) in length, up to a recorded maximum around 1,000 metres (3,300 ft), although most are much smaller at around 10 metres (33 ft). They feed by absorbing an asteroid's minerals through their roots. Smaller space slugs also devour mynocks (in large space slugs, consumed mynocks are not digested and instead become parasites within the space slug). Large space slugs may also consume starships and have been known to eat sections of Imperial Star Destroyers that flew too close. The burrow of a space slug is called a "caysh". They first appeared in The Empire Strikes Back (1980).

=== Worrt ===
Worrts are frog-like creatures native to Tatooine. They feed on mostly insects and rodents and catch prey by sitting stationary in the sand and using their long tongues to catch and wrap around passing animals. Jabba the Hutt kept a number of worrts for pest control. One is briefly seen in Return of the Jedi outside Jabba's palace. It catches an animal with its tongue, swallows it, and burps. They are sometimes confused with frog-dogs.

=== Wraid ===
Wraids are large, lizard-like creatures that live and are hunted for their armored head plates on the desert planet of Tatooine. There is also a subspecies on Korriban.

=== Wyrwulves ===
Wyrwulves are six-legged, dog-like animals that were in fact the children of the Codru-Ji race. When a wyrwulf reaches puberty, it encases itself in a cocoon, from which a Codru-Ji adult emerges several weeks later. They can be found on Munto Codru.

== Y ==
=== Yeltz ===
Yeltz is an amphibious species that resides in the artificial outpost planets of the Lupania ring. No one but Yaddle has seen the creature, and thus it is still regarded as a legend. They are thought to possess the ability to turn transparent under water. When submerged, they are fearsome predators, but when on-land, they are shy and tamable.

=== Yeomet ===
Yeomets are trash-eating quadrupeds that live on artificial habitats, like space stations or large capital ships. They are able to eat almost any form of matter, thanks to a special digestive enzyme triggered by strong electromagnetic radiation. They carry disease.

=== Yorik coral ===
Yorik coral was the primary shipbuilding material of the Yuuzhan Vong. It was grown on-planet in the shape of a ship. Later, symbiotic creatures were implanted or grown within it to form the ship's functions. The completed yorik ship had a nervous system that controlled and coordinated the various functions, and a circulatory system that sustained them.

=== Ysalamiri ===
Ysalamiri are furry salamander-like creatures that live on Myrkr. They have the unique property of repelling the Force, rendering all Force powers within their sphere of influence void; for this reason, they are prominently used by Grand Admiral Thrawn in his campaigns against the New Republic. The supposed reason for the Force bubble is that it acts as a way to hide from the other unique carnivores of Myrkr that use the Force to hunt down prey, such as the vornskr. The term "bubble" is particularly apt because, like water bubbles underwater, multiple ysalamiri's bubbles reinforce each other instead of overlapping. Because of this, large sections of Myrkr are completely removed from the Force.

== Z ==
=== Zakkeg ===
Zakkegs are large beasts that reside on Dxun. They are relatively solitary creatures, with thick hides, and covered in spikes and horns. Along with their tough hide for defense, they are also immune to most Force powers. Zakkeg are tough, and are a good challenge for Mandalorians.

=== Zillo Beast ===
The Zillo Beast is a lengthy creature sporting the unique feature of five limbs, the fifth protruding from behind its shoulder blades. It first appeared in the second season of the popular Cartoon Network series The Clone Wars, toward the end of the season. It was the dominant predator on Malastare before the Dugs wiped them out using various methods, including drilling for fuel that poisons them. Though they were rendered extinct, rumors spread of a surviving Zillo that would bring about their apocalypse. While the Republic engaged in a battle against droids on the planet, they tested a new weapon (a type of E.M.P) over the hollow ground concealing the last Zillo Beast in its cave. Destroying the droids and accidentally opening up the ground leading below, the Dugs immediately wanted to kill the five-story high creature, the last of its kind. Seeing its armor was resistant to most projectiles, including lightsabres, the Republic tricked the Dugs into thinking that the beast perished and instead transported it to Coruscant for study. Before study was over, Palpatine ordered the beast to be killed anyway, but the Zillo Beast broke from its prison to hunt Palpatine down in the nearby Senate building. Because of this and the danger it posed to the citizens of Coruscant, the beast was, shortly after escaping, killed using a toxin gas converted from Malastare fuel. At the end of the episode, Palpatine informs doctor Sionver Boll he wants the beast cloned.

=== Zuxu ===
Zuxu are carnivorous lungfish from the planet Ganlihk. Its flippers are large, padded and prehensile enough for it to actually "walk" on four legs on land for a limited time, sometimes even chasing its prey on land.
