= List of Star Wars species (U–Z) =

This is a list of different Star Wars species, containing the names of fictional sentient species from the Star Wars franchise beginning with the letters U through Z. Star Wars is an American epic space opera film series created by George Lucas. The first film in the series, Star Wars, was released on May 25, 1977 (Star Wars: A New Hope) and became a worldwide pop culture phenomenon, followed by five sequels and three prequels. The series featured a variety of species of alien-like, fictional creatures (often humanoid). For the other species listed alphabetically, see the following:

- List of Star Wars species (A–E)
- List of Star Wars species (F–J)
- List of Star Wars species (K–O)
- List of Star Wars species (P–T)

== Ubese ==
Ubese are humanoid creatures that are primarily called on as mercenaries or bounty hunters. Normally, they are very aggressive people. The Ubese's home world is unknown, and was supposedly heavily bombarded by Republic warships in ancient times. The Republic attacked in a preemptive strike due to aggressive weapon development programs on Ubese worlds. The bombardments destroyed the weapon stockpiles, destroying Uba I outright and poisoning Uba II, Uba III and Uba V. Only Uba IV remained somewhat viable, although the toxic atmosphere requires that the Ubese wear environment suits outdoors. Ubese tend to be very secretive, associating only within their own circles.

They have a very distinct hatred for Jedi, believing they destroyed their homeworld; thus they train with Cortosis weapons, items that can resist lightsabers. During the events of Knights of the Old Republic II: The Sith Lords, they were employed by an Exchange thug to kill the Jedi Exile. The typical Ubese wears a protective, airtight environment suit, and it's usually armed with a double bladed vibrosword. The armor they wear In Star Wars: Knights of the Old Republic is black with a little shine, their faces are not visible due to the helmets they prefer to wear.

Princess Leia was disguised as the Ubese bounty hunter Boushh in the beginning of Return of the Jedi.

Ubese language is simply called Ubese.

== Ugnaught ==
Ugnaughts are a race of workers and scavengers that appear in The Empire Strikes Back, Return of the Jedi, the 2014 TV show Star Wars Rebels, and the 2019 TV show The Mandalorian, as well as in the games Jedi Knight, Jedi Knight II, Star Wars: Bounty Hunter, Lego Star Wars II: The Original Trilogy, Star Wars: The Force Unleashed, Star Wars: The Old Republic and the novel Boba Fett: Crossfire. They are short in stature with pig-like faces.

Kuiil, introduced in The Mandalorian, is an Ugnaught.

== Umbaran ==
Umbarans reside on the dark world of Umbara deep within the Ghost Nebula. Umbarans have the ability to subtly influence or control people easily. They also see in ultraviolet spectrums. Umbarans very closely resemble humans, but with pale, bluish skin and colorless eyes.

Sly Moore, Chancellor Palpatine's staff aide, is an Umbaran.

== Unu ==
Unu is the name given to the main nest or hive of Killiks, an all-female race of hive mind insectoid amazons. Unu was the hive that took in injured Jedi Raynar Thul after he crash-landed on their world. Raynar eventually became UnuThul, leader of the Killiks (name from the hive's name, 'Unu' and Raynar's last name, 'Thul'). Any part of the old Raynar Thul's mind was either destroyed or buried in his own mind. The Unu and Killiks are introduced in The Dark Nest trilogy by Troy Denning, part of the Star Wars Expanded Universe.

== Utai ==
The Utai are one of the two races native to the planet Utapau. They have long eyestalks, a short body structure, two toes per foot, four fingers per hand, and brown eyes that are well adapted to dark conditions. The Utai are also known as Shorts, due to both their short stature and brief lives. They are native to the sinkholes of their home planet, being the first to colonize the walls and crevices. They are primarily working-class people, responsible for large aquaculture plots and domesticating several creatures for use as transports and beasts of burden.

Utai society exists side by side with that of the gaunt Pau'an. They have only been seen in Star Wars: Episode III – Revenge of the Sith. Where the Pau'ans are tall and thin, their Utai cousins are generally short and chubby. Utai have pale, hairless skin and large, oblong heads. Two glassy black eyes protrude on thick stalks from the Utai's face, which is otherwise unremarkable, aside from a small, puckered mouth. Utai have stubby, four-fingered hands and are capable workers and mechanics. An age ago, the Utai were the sole inhabitants of Utapau's plummeting sinkholes, living in dwellings nestled among the crevices of the rocky walls. A planetary climate change forced Utapau's other primary species, the Pau'ans, to migrate underground. The two species formed a mutually beneficial society, merging their disparate civilizations and generally living in peace. A natural hierarchy formed, with the Pau'ans well placed as the rulers and politicians of the Utapaun cities, while the more hands-on Utai served as laborers and workers. Utai also serve as the keepers of the varactyl—super-fast lizard beasts used as mounts on Utapau—and over the years have learned how to tame the creatures. The Utai were completely CG in the movie.

== Utapaun ==
The native inhabitants of Utapau can be divided into two distinct species. The taller, more highly evolved Pau'ans have deeply lined, ash-colored faces, gaunt builds, and wear thick, tightly fitting clothes. The smaller Utai make up the working class. They have rounded faces with distended eyes, and have a short, stocky build.

== Vaathkree ==
This species evolved on the planet of Vaathkree. They seem to be made of stone and metal, but it is only an armor-like covering. They are known for their religion, centered on bartering.

== Vagaari ==
The Vagaari are a humanoid species from the Unknown Regions. They are a race of nomadic conquerors and slavers that ruled a considerable area in the Unknown Regions. They are led by the Miskara, a position obtained after successfully executing a coup d'état. Their clothing includes voluminous robes and large Vagaari traditional masks intended to compensate for their height and scare enemies. Their government was the Vagaari Empire. They appear in Outbound Flight and Survivor's Quest, and are mentioned significantly in the Ascendancy Trilogy.

== Veknoid ==
Veknoids, also known as Velkoids, were a species native to the planet Moonus Mandel. The famous podracer Teemto Pagalies was a Veknoid, as was the Jedi Master Zao.

== Vella ==
Vella are the amphibious humainoid inhabitants of the planet Velreone.

== Verpine ==
The Verpine inhabit the Roche asteroid field and run the aerospace engineering company Slayn & Korpil. Verpine are characterized by their bipedal, wingless bodies and their unusual ability to communicate with each other via organic short l-wave radio transmissions originating from their antenna. They also have vision which enables them to view microscopic fractures and stresses, which is one of the reasons they make excellent mechanic and repair crews. With Admiral Ackbar, they designed the B-wing. They have an egalitarian, completely democratized society.Until recently, the Verpine do not play a significant part in any of the Star Wars movies or novels, but several of their devices do appear in the video game series Knights of the Old Republic as well as in Star Wars novels. These devices seem to be almost exclusively weaponry or arms-related and include a wide array of hand-held projectiles that can alternatively function as shotguns, sniper rifles, high-power assault rifles and fully automatic machine guns.

However, in Karen Traviss' book Sacrifice, they approached Boba Fett with offers of a protection agreement, wherein Verpine technology would be combined with Mandalorian iron to produce unmatched weaponry. Fett agrees, and through the book it is apparent that as opposed to being equals, the Verpine fall more under a Mandalorian sphere of influence. The Verpine initiate the terms of the treaty when an argument with the Murkhanan over patents is ignored by the New Republic. Jacen Solo ordered part of a fleet to patrol the space between planets, arguably to get a look at the new Mandalorian fighter, the Bes'uliik, and also setting up a possible Mandalorian/Republic conflict. The book ends with Boba Fett leading a strike force of Bes'ulikks to bomb a series of Murkhanan industrial areas, and to announce that the Mandalorians have returned.

== Vodran ==
The Vodrans are a species of 1.8-meter-tall humanoid reptiles, with tough skin ranging in coloration from olive to brown, and a small frame of spiny horns around their faces. Though warm-blooded, they laid reptilian eggs, with an egg clutch typically producing two or three Vodran young. They were native to the planet Vodran on the fringes of the Si'klaata Cluster.

Before the founding of the Galactic Republic, the Vodrans were approached by Dojundo the Hutt, an emissary from the Hutt Empire, to recruit the Vodrans for the Hutts' war with the legendary Xim the Despot. The Vodrans, believing the Hutts to be evil deities, agreed to serve the Hutts. Their presence, along with those of the Weequay, Klatooinians and Nikto, was instrumental in the defeat of Xim's army of war droids at the Third Battle of Vontor. After the victory at Vontor, the Hutts had the Vodran representative, Kl'ieutu Mutela, along with the representatives of the Klatooinans, Weequay and Nikto, sign themselves into "eternal" servitude, which the Vodran fulfilled faithfully.

In time, Vodrans adopted Hutt culture as their own. Their society was organized into miniature kajidics, and their family clans answered directly to the Hutt Clan of Ancients. Their dealings with the rest of the galaxy always went through their Hutt masters.

== Vor ==
The Vor are a pterosaur-like species that live on the planet Vortex. The Vor tend not to use extreme force when dealing with foreign threats, but instead rely on their superior morality with their strong reason and intellect.

== Voxyn ==
The Voxyn are a reptilian species known for their ferocious defense mechanisms. As well as being extremely agile, they bear poisonous spinal bristles, spit a strong acid (brown in color), and have a screech noted to cause bleeding of the ears in some of the humanoid characters. These vicious creatures were created by the Yuuzhan Vong during the "New Jedi Order" time period to hunt and kill Jedi. There is little more known about the creatures due to a limited appearance in the novel Star by Star by Troy Denning. All other appearances of the species in other franchise publications are as mentions.

== Vratix ==
The Vratix are native to the planet of Thyferra. They are essential in the creation of the healing fluid bacta. They perfected the creation of bacta by combining alazhi and kavam. They vastly outnumber the human natives of the planet, but are considered inferior to their corporate counterparts.

The Vratix are humanoid insects. They have large, compound eyes, a stalk-like neck, and three pairs of limbs sprouting from a cylindrical thorax and abdomen. The upper set of limbs acts as triple-jointed arms, while the lower two serve as legs. The last set of limbs is well muscled, and is used in jumping. Most Vratix are gray in color, with the shades darkening with age.

== Vulptereen ==
Vulptereen are a stocky race from Vulpter, recognizable by their shovel-like snouts which sported six tusks and a single long feeler.

== Vurk ==
Vurks are a reptilian humanoid species, with elongated faces, dark eyes, and a sweeping crest extending from their skulls, giving them the appearance of a parasaurolophus. They are native to the remote planet Sembla, a watery world with warm shallow seas, small volcanic islands, and beautiful coral reefs rich in crystals.

Vurks are nomadic and they are equally comfortable on both land and water. Though they are very ethical and peaceful they are wrongly considered primitive by the rest of the galaxy because they have not developed large settlements and technology. This, however, is due to not needing them and not because of low intelligence level.

Jedi Master Coleman Trebor was a Vurk.

== Weequay ==
They are a race of humanoid creatures that hail from the planet Sriluur, a harsh desert planet lending to the species' tanned skin tone and rough, sandy, wrinkled skin. Their eyes are dark and slightly recessed into their skull; their hair tied into at least one long braid — a staple characteristic and religious tradition.

Due to Sriluur's proximity to Hutt Space, Weequay expatriates are often found as bodyguards in Hutt syndicates, through both employment and enslavement, many are seen in Return of the Jedi, during the Sarlacc Pit scene. The most famous character from this species is the pirate Hondo Ohnaka who appears in The Clone Wars and Rebels animated series.

They are a laconic people, with traditions rooted deeply in their religious beliefs. Much of their culture is structured around the worship of a pantheon of gods, primarily the God of the Moon, Quay. Their cities are built around a temple, known as a thal.

== Whaladon ==
Whaladons were large sentient mammals native on Mon Cala. They communicated via sing-songs. Poaching of Whaladons was forbidden by Mon Calamari law but they were hunted when the Galactic Empire occupied the planet.

They were first featured in the novel The Glove of Darth Vader.

== Wharl ==
Wharls are another name for the Tchuukthai.

== Whiphid ==
Whiphids (also known as Toolans) are tall, muscled, furred creatures with great tusks from the planet Toola. They are great hunters and they export ice to other planets. They can also go into a coma-like state to heal major wounds.

One particular Whiphid was J'Quille, who, while working under Jabba the Hutt, had tried to assassinate him with a slow-acting poison in his food. Another Whiphid was Jedi Master K'Kruhk. He supposedly died at the Battle of Hypori, though he was shown to be alive approximately 150 years later. Aiaks Fwa was a Whiphid bounty hunter employed by Jabba the Hutt for services pertaining to the Battle of Ylesia.

Many Whiphids can be found as thugs and enforcers in the underworld. A sizable chunk of the workers in the aggressive, regulation-smashing Offworld Mining Corporation were Whiphids, and the crime boss Lady Valarian operating off of Tatooine, a one-time competitor with Jabba the Hutt, was also a Whiphid. Members of this species are often disliked by other races for some of their alleged crude and brutish tendencies.

The home planet of the Whiphids is the icy world of Toola in the Outer Rim. Clone Commander Keller led an Imperial task force to root out Jedi hiding on Toola in the early days of the New Order. Luke Skywalker, Jedi Knight, found Jedi artifacts left behind by a Master of the Old Jedi Order in a cave there—possibly the work of Keller's division, although Skywalker observed lightsaber slashes in the Jedi's empty robes that he believed must have been the handiwork of his father, Darth Vader.

== Wirutid ==
A Wirutid is a hyper-intelligent fungus that evolves into a human form to secure shelter and trap prey.

== Wol Cabasshite ==
Wol Cabasshites are an example of a culture that has advanced to sentience without the need for technology. Their evolved brains are highly intelligent, but with a life cycle so abstract and alien, their ideas are often unclear. Studying Wol Cabasshite's philosophy has long been a pastime of the intellectual elite, with longstanding debates regarding interpretation of the most famous and bizarre of Wol Cabasshite texts.

The closest known genetic relative of the very long-lived Wol Cabasshites is a small, non-sentient species of plasma leech parasite whose entire life-cycle occurs on spacecraft where they feed on plasma and other energetic power sources. Millennia of space travel have spread both the non-sentient leech and the Wol Cabasshite throughout the galaxy, far from their homeworld of Wol Cabassh.

Wol Cabasshites are remarkably hardy. They can exist in both vacuum and atmosphere, having no respiratory system and a naturally pressurized interior. Wol Cabasshites can tolerate remarkable temperature extremes.

With a plasma-rich diet and high metallic content in their blood, Wol Cabasshites exude a magnetic field controlled by certain internal muscles, including their tongues. By shaping and focusing this field, Cabasshites communicate with each other at a range of up to 25 meters.

Their language uses phonemic pulses of energy with syntactic contours in the field. Magnetic singing is an important part of Wol Cabasshite cultures. Gifted Wol Cabasshites can use magnetic fields to communicate directly with the neurons of other sentients, though this often requires direct contact. The sometimes unsettling sensation of direct neuron communication with a Wol Cabasshite has spread to rumors that the species can take control of a subject's brain, though that is not the case.

The Wol Cabasshite ability to manipulate magnetic fields has resulted in the development of devices by other cultures to assist in communication. Wol Cabasshites can operate devices attuned to their magnetic singing for the purposes of locomotion, communication and even defense, though most do not bother. Most Wol Cabasshites are content to simply sit and contemplate the nature of the universe... and eat.

Physiologically, Wol Cabasshites are mostly stomach; they even have two brains, one for digestive tasks and one for cognition. They eat constantly, extracting nutrients and metals from nearly any substance they touch. There are no known substances that are toxic to Wol Cabasshites, though they are susceptible to Brainworm Rot Type A, an airborne virus that affects their cognitive functions. Given the bizarre nature of Wol Cabasshite thought, diagnosis is very difficult.

Although Wol Cabasshites reproduce asexually by vomiting out their stomach linings (which become pupal Cabasshite), adults may exchange genetic material during mutual tongue grooming. This results in organisms exhibiting isolated genetic properties of other individuals.

== Wookiee ==
Wookiees are generally peaceful creatures of the forests of Kashyyyk. They have a tribal society governed by a Chieftain. They are very tall, furry and powerful with a humanoid shape. They have extremely sharp rectractable claws; however, it is considered a Tribal crime to use claws in combat. Aside from their stature Wookiee have bow casters which can also be seen with mounted scopes. They are considered loyal friends, and commit life debts to people who save them—the most well known being the life debt between Chewbacca and Han Solo.

== Woostoid ==
Yellow-skinned humanoids from the planet Woostri. They were targeted during Grand Admiral Thrawn's campaign of galactic conquest. Surprisingly, these aliens held Imperial doctrines as truth. In the novel The Last Command, these aliens were referred to as the Woostroid.

== Wroonian ==
Wroonians are a blue-skinned humanoid race from the planet Wroona in the Inner Rim.

== X'ting ==
The X'ting are an insectoid species, native to the planet Cestus, that change gender every three years. This species proved to be dying out in the novel The Cestus Deception.

== Xendekian ==
The Xendekian are a small species of blue, brown, green, and reddish-brown colored skin native to the planet of Xendek. They first appeared in the comic strip called "Endangered, Part 1" in the lead story of Star Wars Adventures 7.

== Xexto ==
The Xexto are short, (1.30 m [4'3"] max), have four arms, two legs and long necks. They hail from the planet Troiken. Some prominent Xexto include Gasgano, the Podracer pilot; and Yarael Poof, Jedi Master and one of the last members of the Jedi Council before the Great Jedi Purge, who was a member of a genetically altered sect of Xexto, the Quermians.

== Y'bith ==
Millions of years ago, sentience took root among the ancient forerunners of the Bith species on Clak'Dor VII. As the Bith evolved, they developed impressive cities in the mountains and jungles of their world. The capital city of Weogar and the domed city of Nozho stood for centuries as testament to the achievement of the proto-Bith culture, but relations between the cities soured, and they developed a fierce rivalry. About three hundred years ago, the tensions boiled over as a dispute over a stardrive patent ignited in a civil war. When the war finally ended, Clak'dor VII's biosphere was ruined. A biological attack launched at Nozho had shattered the city, mutating its populace, and the surrounding wildlife.

Most Nozho citizens were killed outright, but many who survived developed mutagenic irregularities that soon led to the creation of a subspecies of Bith. The Y'bith—which translates as "Ghost Bith," eventually left the hermetically sealed cities that were built amid the ruins, and attempted to establish a permanent population on Clak'dor IV, where they eventually founded the city of New Nozho.

The bio-engineering geniuses among the Y'bith stabilized much of the mutation's worst effects, but the populace had to adapt to their new traits of poor eyesight, stronger hands and feet, ductile mouth structures, sensitive skin and thicker bones. The Y'bith have been tolerated by the Bith, though not openly accepted by mainstream Bith culture. Though some claim residual guilt over the bombings that created the Y'bith as the cause of Bith apprehension, the Bith themselves pragmatically deny such reasons. They cite the Y'bith's volatile biochemistry that triggers bouts of violence and aggression as reason enough to keep their distance.

The Y'bith have been working to gain acceptance as members of the galactic community, with New Nozho becoming a notable trade port. Over the course of generations, the Y'bith had spread to other worlds, forming a notable minority presence on Nar Shaddaa and Coruscant, where they aided the rebuilding efforts following the Yuuzhan Vong war.

The Y'bith see the story of their people as one of success, and will continue working tirelessly until the whole galaxy, including their Bith cousins, agree.

== Yaka ==
The Yaka are a race of near-human cyborgs. They were transformed after their home planet was invaded centuries ago by superintelligent inhabitants of Arkania, a neighboring star system. The Arkanians forced the Yakas to undergo surgery in which they implanted cyborg brain enhancers, increasing the species' intelligence to genius level. Thus, the brutish-looking Yakas are much smarter than they appear. A side effect of the implants is a twisted sense of humor that all Yakas possess.

== Yevetha ==
Yevetha are a Star Wars legends species now extinct or severely endangered skeletal-looking race of humanoids from the planet N'zoth, near the Galactic Core.

They were extremely xenophobic, considering all other races to be vermin. The Empire utilized them as shipyard workers and technicians during the Galactic Civil War, primarily because of their perfectionist nature and knack for technology. This backfired when the Yevetha took over all the Black 15 shipyards and killed or enslaved all the Imperials during a full retreat. During the events of the New Jedi Order, the Yuuzhan Vong attacked and destroyed the Yevetha at the behest of the Fia, a race from the Koornacht Cluster world of Galantos. So great was the Yevethan disdain for other species that one of the survivors chose to attack and destroy a Chiss clawcraft rather than accept aid.

An Imperial officer once commented to Princess Leia that the Empire had always feared the potential of the Yevetha, noting that they were never allowed access to sensitive technology like hyperdrives.

At their peak, the Yevetha controlled a vast fleet of Imperial Star Destroyers, Interdictor Cruisers, their own custom-made thrustships, and the Super Star Destroyer Pride of Yevetha.

== Yoda's species ==
An unnamed and extremely rare race of diminutive green-skinned humanoids with large pointed ears. Some are powerful with the Force. Known members include Yoda (introduced in The Empire Strikes Back), Yaddle (first seen in Episode I – The Phantom Menace), Vandar Tokare (Knights of the Old Republic) and Grogu (also known as "the Child" or, colloquially, "Baby Yoda") of The Mandalorian. They can live for many centuries, as Yoda claims to be 900 years old. Much about the species, including its name and origins, has been deliberately left vague by George Lucas and other Star Wars writers.

== Yuuzhan Vong / Grysk ==
The Yuuzhan Vong were introduced as the main antagonists of the book series The New Jedi Order (1999–2003) depicted as an extragalactic, technophobic, fanatically religious species who were intent upon conquering the galaxy, which they attempted during the Yuuzhan Vong War. They were both invisible to direct Force sight and unaffected by direct Force powers. The Yuuzhan Vong used biotechnology and their culture was based on dominating, eradicating, or enslaving others, and body mutilation for social status.

The species was said to have featured peripherally in canceled episodes of The Clone Wars.

The invasion is coming, Lord Vader. But I have now bought the Empire time to prepare.

— Grand Admiral Thrawn, to Darth Vader

Canon

After the October 2012 acquisition of Lucasfilm by Disney, the Yuuzhan Vong were declared non-canonical in April 2014. In their stead, The Force Awakens (2015) introduced the First Order, a successor state that arose from one of many Imperial Remnants between 5 and 21 ABY, and eventually destroyed the New Republic in 34 ABY, while the Resistance (formed in 28 ABY) continued to fight against the First Order. A canonical version of the Yuuzhan Vong, now known as the Grysk, was introduced in the Timothy Zahn novel Thrawn: Alliances (2018). Both species are described as having sloping foreheads and skull-like faces, as well as being a threat to the Chiss Ascendancy hailing from the Unknown Regions and enslaving other races, though the Grysk use conventional mechanical technology rather than biotechnology, and the novel is set in an earlier time frame than the previous non-canonical Legends novels. The Grysk made a major appearance—as Jixtus—in Thrawn: The Ascendancy Trilogy.

== Yuvernian ==
The Yuvernians are a two-headed, mottled-skinned, reptilian horselike race from the planet of Yuvern. They were fairly large beings, 4.8 meters in length, and standing 2.4 meters in height. They had yellow skin with black spots and elongated skulls. A Yuvernian named Cane Adiss can be seen in Jabba's palace in Return of the Jedi.

== Yuzzem ==
The Yuzzem ( not to be confused with the Yuzzum) are a large powerful mammalian species similar to Wookiees. Most were enslaved during the reign of the Empire and taken from their home planet of Ragna III to do hard labor. They appear similar to Wookiees, but appearing more like werewolves. Their similarities to Wookiees have led people to believe the two share a common ancestor, but this has not been confirmed.

== Yuzzum ==
The Yuzzums (not to be confused with Yuzzem) are fur-covered mammals with a wide mouth with protruding teeth on top of their heads and long legs. They are less intelligent than the Ewoks and dwell on the plains of the forest moon Endor. Groups of Yuzzums often hunt in packs through the tall grass of the plains hunting for rodents to eat.

They have been exported as pets, but are not very good at it. They have a musical language and some Yuzzums have found employment as singers. One of the singers in Jabba the Hutt's court was a Yuzzum named Joh Yowza. Only three Yuzzums have been seen so far: Joh Yowza, Schmood, and Wam Lufba. Joh Yowza is the only CGI Yuzzum, the rest are puppets.

== Zabrak ==
The Zabrak are humanoids whose most distinctive feature is the array of small horns on top of their heads. Their home planet is Iridonia, though they have a subspecies hailing from the planet of Dathomir. It is believed that they are among the galaxy's first space-faring people. They have strong willpower and are a stubborn, proud people. By nature, they tend to be independent and fearless, hence have never been a successful venture in the slave trade. One commonly recognized individual of this race is Darth Maul, Sith apprentice of Darth Sidious. Their crown of horns typically grow in at puberty, and are considered secondary sex characteristics. The pattern in which horns grow differs between Zabrak sub-species. It is analogous to race/subspecies.

Zabrak eye colors are often similar to the eye colors of humans, with blues and browns being the most common. Yellow, purple, red, green, and orange eyes are also seen regularly. However, Darth Maul's red-yellow eye color was apparently the result of corruption by the Dark Side. Zabrak also traditionally have facial tattoos, typically composed of a pattern of thin lines, which is considered the most traditional of Zabrak tattoos.

Zabrak are popular in the gaming world. The customizable player character of Jedi Knight: Jedi Academy, Jaden Korr, can be a Zabrak female. Players of the MMO Star Wars: Galaxies were able to choose Zabrak as a playable race, and can currently do so in the Star Wars MMO, Star Wars: The Old Republic. In Star Wars: Battlefront II, Iridonian and Dathomirian Zabraks were both choosable classes for heavy and specialist.

=== Iridonian ===
Iridonian Zabrak skin coloration could be light tan, light, tan, dark, brown, or even moonlight blue. Zabraks could be completely bald or fully haired. Certain horn patterns are linked with certain hair patterns or lack thereof. Hair can be any of the same colors seen in the human species. However, unlike humans, Zabrak males do not have eyebrows and do not grow facial hair. There is also a different pattern of horns for each gender. The horns on the female are more directed to the front of the head, while the most commonly males have them spanned all across the top of their head.

Iridonians kept their tattoos more conservative than Dathomirians. Zabrak are also well known for their skill with technology and highly advanced weaponry.

Known Iridonian Zabrak from canon include Agen Kolar, Eeth Koth, and Sugi (The Clone Wars). Known Iridonian Zabrak from the Star Wars expanded universe include Bao-Dur (Knights of the Old Republic II), Maris Brood (Star Wars: The Force Unleashed), and Wolf Sazen (Star Wars: Legacy).

=== Dathomirian ===
Dathomirian Zabrak skin coloration for males could be red, peach, or yellow. Females could have white, blue, or gray skin. Only males had horns, females didn't. Male Dathomirian Zabraks did not have hair unlike Iridonians, but females could.

Dathomirian tattoos were quite elaborate, and were applied to them at a young age. Tattoos could be black or brown and were created using the paste of the mushling plant from their home planet of Dathomir.

Male Dathomirians referred to each other as brothers. They were skilled in melee and hand-to-hand combat and known for their tribal and savage ways.

Female Dathomirians referred to each other as sisters and lived in clans with each practicing the dark side of the force which they called, "magick". They're also the more dominant gender.

Known Dathomirian Zabrak from canon and the expanded universe include Darth Maul, Savage Opress and Asajj Ventress (The Clone Wars).

== Zeffo ==
The Zeffo, also known as the Zeffonians, are an extinct race of anthropomorphic force-sensitive beings. From the planet of the same name, the Zeffo is introduced in the video game Star Wars Jedi: Fallen Order, which was developed by Respawn Entertainment and published by Electronic Arts. The Zeffo were ruled by Sages, and tombs were built to remember them. The Zeffo valued the Force, and are often credited as "the first of the force-sensitive." The exact reason for the extinction of the Zeffo is unknown, but in a recording left behind by an unknown Zeffo Sage, he states that his people were "learning the ways of pride and greed."

The Zeffo homeworld has a rocky and mountainous structure, similar to the structure of Earth. After the extinction of the Zeffo species, Imperial forces occupy the planet. An Imperial excavation can be found on Zeffo, as well as a crashed Venator near an ancient tomb.

== Zeltron ==
The extremely attractive Zeltrons are a near-human species native to the planet Zeltros. Their skin is bright pink, full red to dark brown, a special pigmentation that develops from a reaction to their sun's radiation. The Zeltron people have the ability to project powerful pheromones, much like those emitted by Falleen. These can be activated at will and can affect a specific individual or entire groups at the same time.

Zeltrons are also empathic, able to sense the feelings of others as well as project their own. For this reason their love and comfort is extremely important to them. Sharing positive emotions is deemed to everyone's benefit, while sharing negative emotions is not. In accordance with this, Zeltros' democratic government will go to great lengths to make sure no one on Zeltros is unhappy. Zeltros has had few tyrants or despotic rulers, because they cannot commit atrocities without experiencing another's pain. Zeltros has, however, been invaded twelve times in the past six centuries. But most invaders, because of the Zeltrons' pheromones, have given up their hostile intentions and joined in the non-stop festivities. Hence, Zeltrons do not worry about such trivial matters as planetary defenses or military forces. They are able fighters, though, and they stay in peak physical condition at all times.

Zeltrons are described as going to any length to please guests, and getting pleasure from being hospitable. They hold massive celebrations for practically any event. They are also described as extremely promiscuous, and proud of their sexual prowess. They consider the concept of monogamy quaint, but unrealistic.

Zeltron technology is on par with most space-faring worlds. They possess space travel, advanced agricultural and industrial methods, and excellent knowledge of medicine, particularly antibiotics. Zeltron scientists have provided notable refinements in the fields of science, and created much of the technology for the Pleasure Domes at Hologram Fun World.

Zeltron craftsmen are famous in the galaxy for their erotic sculptures, paintings, and other works of art. Also in high demand in other worlds are Zeltron courtesans, known as criblez, who fulfill any physical desire one may have without limits. Many crime lords, particularly Hutts, have taken special interest in Zeltron servants. This is because of their popularity, and because they spend their lives pursuing gratification, Zeltrons are quite common in the galaxy, particularly at spaceports, where they can find many prospective mates.

This race has now appeared in the Star Wars video game Knights of the Old Republic II: The Sith Lords. One Zeltron seen in the Star Wars series was Luxa, an employee for the Exchange on Telos.

== Zhell ==
The Zhell are the supposed pre-evolved state of humans in the Star Wars galaxy.

The Zhell were dominant on Coruscant at some point before 25,000 BBY (Before the Battle of Yavin) and were repeatedly attacked by the Taung, a species who also lived on Coruscant. In the middle of their epic battles against the Zhell, their efforts were helped by an erupting volcano that blocked out the sun. The Taung, now calling themselves the Warriors of the Shadow, then attacked the primary Zhell city, until the Taung were driven back and off the planet, fleeing to the outer rim. The Taung would eventually become known as the Mandalorians, after their leader, Mandalore the First.

== Zillo Beast ==
The Zillo Beast was a gargantuan serpentine creature with a lengthy, whip-like tail. At 97 meters tall, the Zillo Beast towered over all species on its native planet of Malastare and was considered at the top of its food chain until its presumed extinction. Its tail contained eight sharp spikes, and the beast itself uniquely possessed a third arm protruding from its back.

Its heavy plated armor was invulnerable to explosions, blaster fire, and even lightsaber strikes. Jedi Knight Anakin Skywalker discovered that gaps in the creature's armored plates could be exploited to damage or stun the creature. On one such occasion, clone troopers were able to subdue the creature by using stun tanks aimed at the gaps in its armor to put the beast to sleep for transport to Coruscant.

This creature first appeared in The Clone Wars season 2, episode 18, "The Zillo Beast".

== Zygerrian ==
The Zygerrians are a race of feline-like bipeds, who are slavers from the planet Zygerria which is governed by queen Miraj Scintel. They appear on The Clone Wars during the "Slaves of the Republic" arc.

== See also ==
- List of Star Wars species (A–E)
- List of Star Wars species (F–J)
- List of Star Wars species (K–O)
- List of Star Wars species (P–T)
