= Utapau =

Fictional planet in Star Wars universe

- First appearance: Star Wars: Episode III – Revenge of the Sith
- Created by: George Lucas
- Genre: Science Fiction

In-universe information
- Type: Planet
- Location: Outside edge
- Characters: Utai, Pau'an and Amanins
- Battles: Battle of Utapau
- Atmosphere: Breathable
- Language: Pau'an; Utai; Basic

Utapau is a planet featured in the Star Wars fictional universe. Located in the Outer Rim, it orbits a star of the same name. It is most famous for being the scene of the Battle of Utapau, marked by the duel where Obi-Wan Kenobi kills General Grievous. It is also known as the homeworld of the Grand Inquisitor of the Galactic Empire, an agent under the orders of Darth Vader.

Despite its mostly desert surface, Utapau is the home world of the Utais, Pau'ans and Amanins. Historically neutral during the major galactic conflicts, the final moments of the Clone Wars saw Utapau occupied by the Confederation of Independent Systems and then by the Galactic Empire.

The planet was created for the film Revenge of the Sith. It was created using a number of cinematographic disciplines, largely using computer-generated images (CGI), but also models, live-action shots and inset actors.

Utapau is also featured in the novelization of the film, an unfinished episode of the TV series The Clone Wars, and in several other novels, video games and comic strips.

== Context ==
The Star Wars universe is set in a galaxy that is the scene of clashes between the Jedi Knights and the Dark Lords of the Sith, people who are sensitive to the Force, a mysterious energy field that gives them parapsychic powers. The Jedi master the light side of the Force, a beneficial and defensive power, to maintain peace in the galaxy. The Sith use the dark side, a harmful and destructive power, for their own purposes and to dominate the galaxy.

Although the Galactic Republic and the Jedi Order seem to have succeeded in securing peace across the galaxy, the discovery of a Sith apprentice on Naboo in 32 BBY (Note: The reference point (ground zero in the Star Wars chronology) is the Battle of Yavin, which takes place in Episode IV of the saga. For example, this discovery takes place thirty-two years before that battle.) leads Jedi Knight Obi-Wan Kenobi to take young Anakin Skywalker, who possesses a previously unseen affinity for the Force, under his wing. A war then begins between the Galactic Republic, led by Supreme Chancellor Palpatine, and the secessionists of the Confederacy of Independent Systems and their droid army. As the war comes to an end, the separatist leaders are forced to retreat to the remote planet Utapau.

== Geography ==
=== Spatial location ===
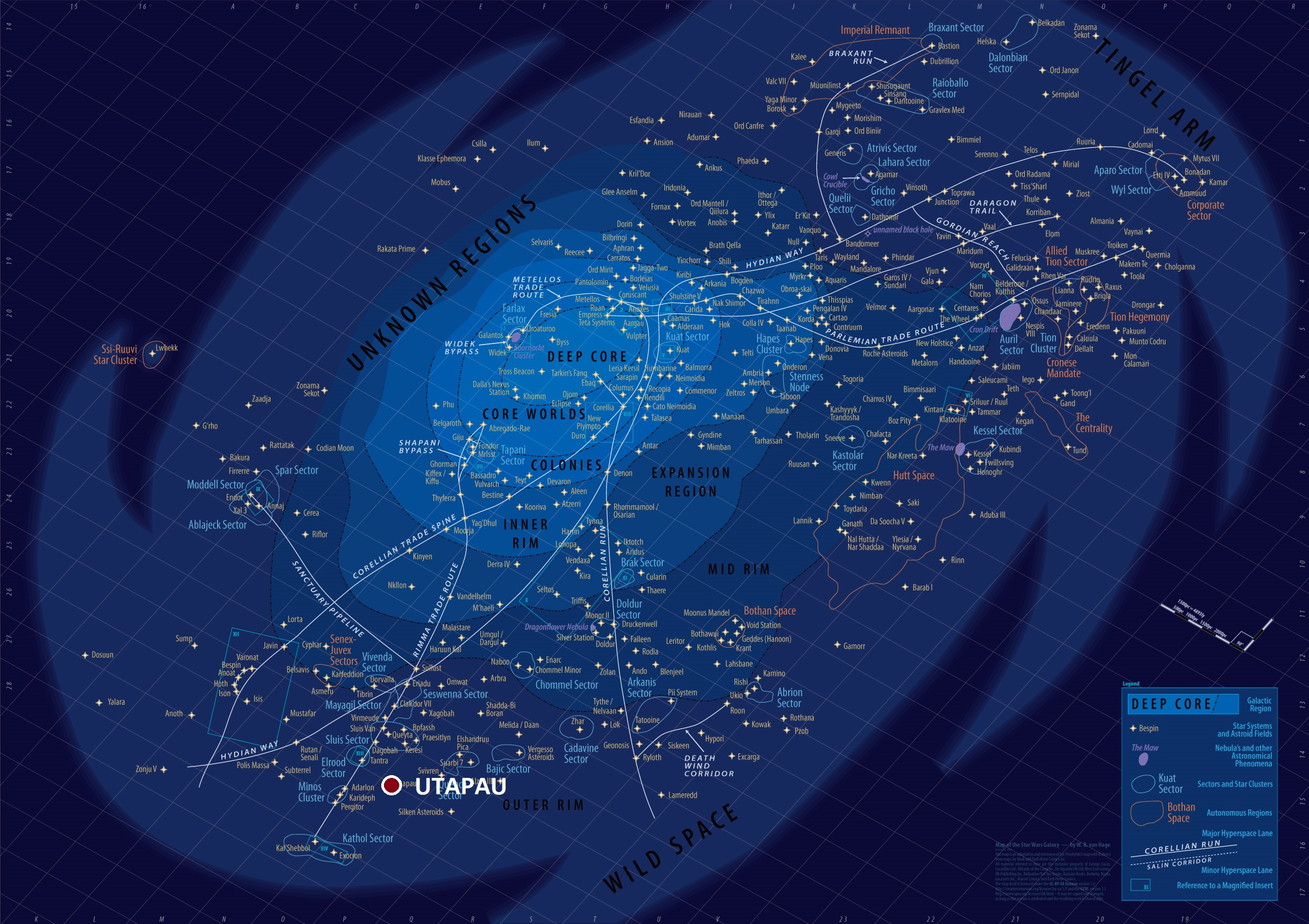
Location of Utapau in the galaxy (unofficial map).

Utapau is located in the Tarabba sector of the Outer Rim. The planet, in the system of the same name, orbits the star of the same name. Of the seven planets in this system, Utapau is the fourth from the star. Nine satellites orbit the planet, making it the second planet in the sector with the most natural satellites.

More specifically, it is part of the greater Sarin sector, a group of sectors including Qeimet and the surrounding areas, including Tarabba. This spatial region is the result of a military division of the galaxy made by the Galactic Republic, with each sector associated with a clone sector army. The sector army to which Utapau belongs is the 15th clone army of the Republic, also known as the "Nebular Hook ".

=== Topography ===
Utapau is particularly arid. Its surface is covered with desert plains. However, it is also covered by numerous chasms, faults, fossilised dunes and sinkholes. While violent winds batter the surface, the bottoms of the sinkholes shelter bodies of water, as well as a large subterranean ocean. Utapau's nine moons exert a strong gravitational pull on the planet, giving rise to strong tides that erode the planet's rock and cause major earthquakes.

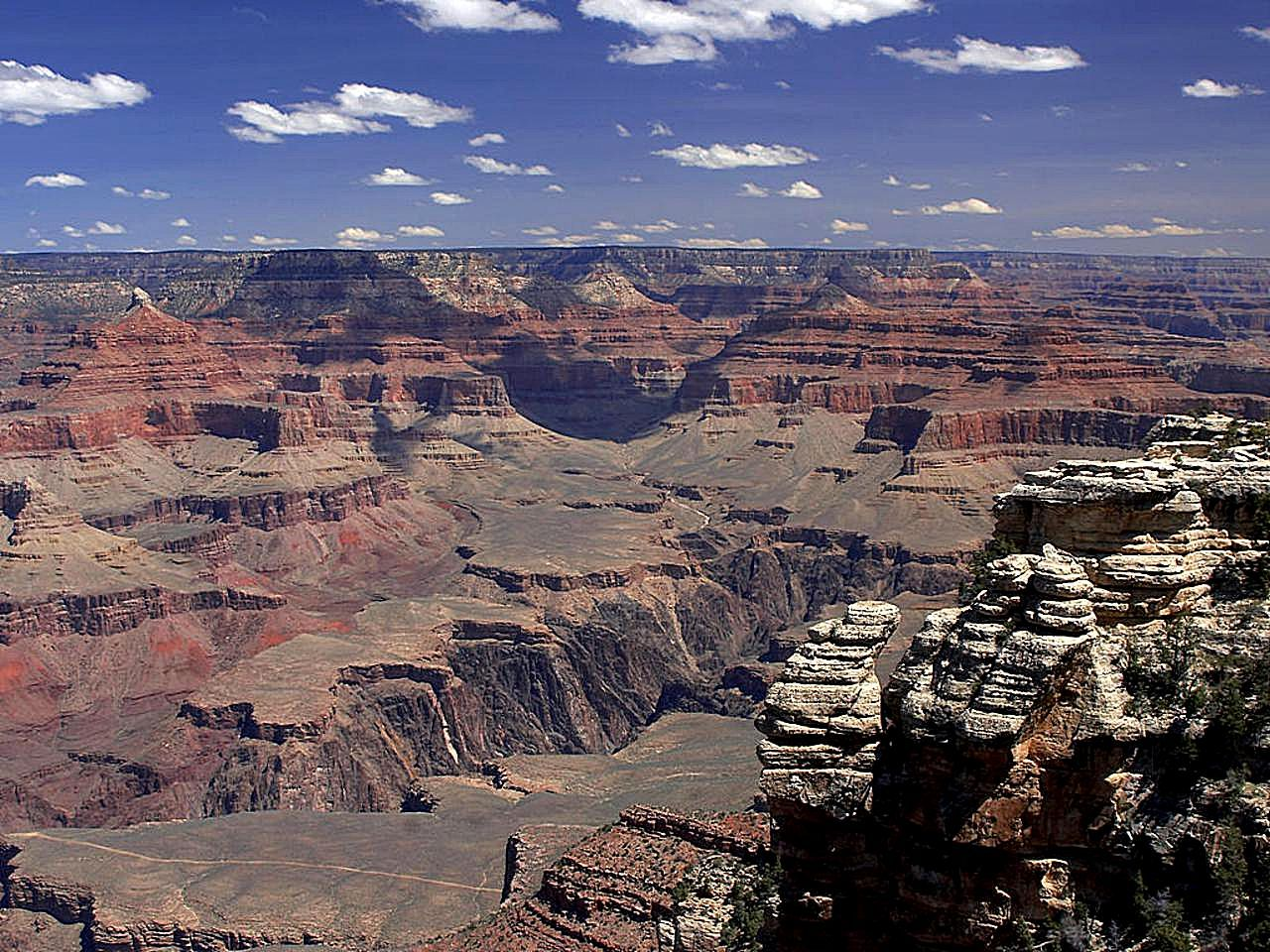
A landscape of canyons and gorges, similar to those found on Utapau.

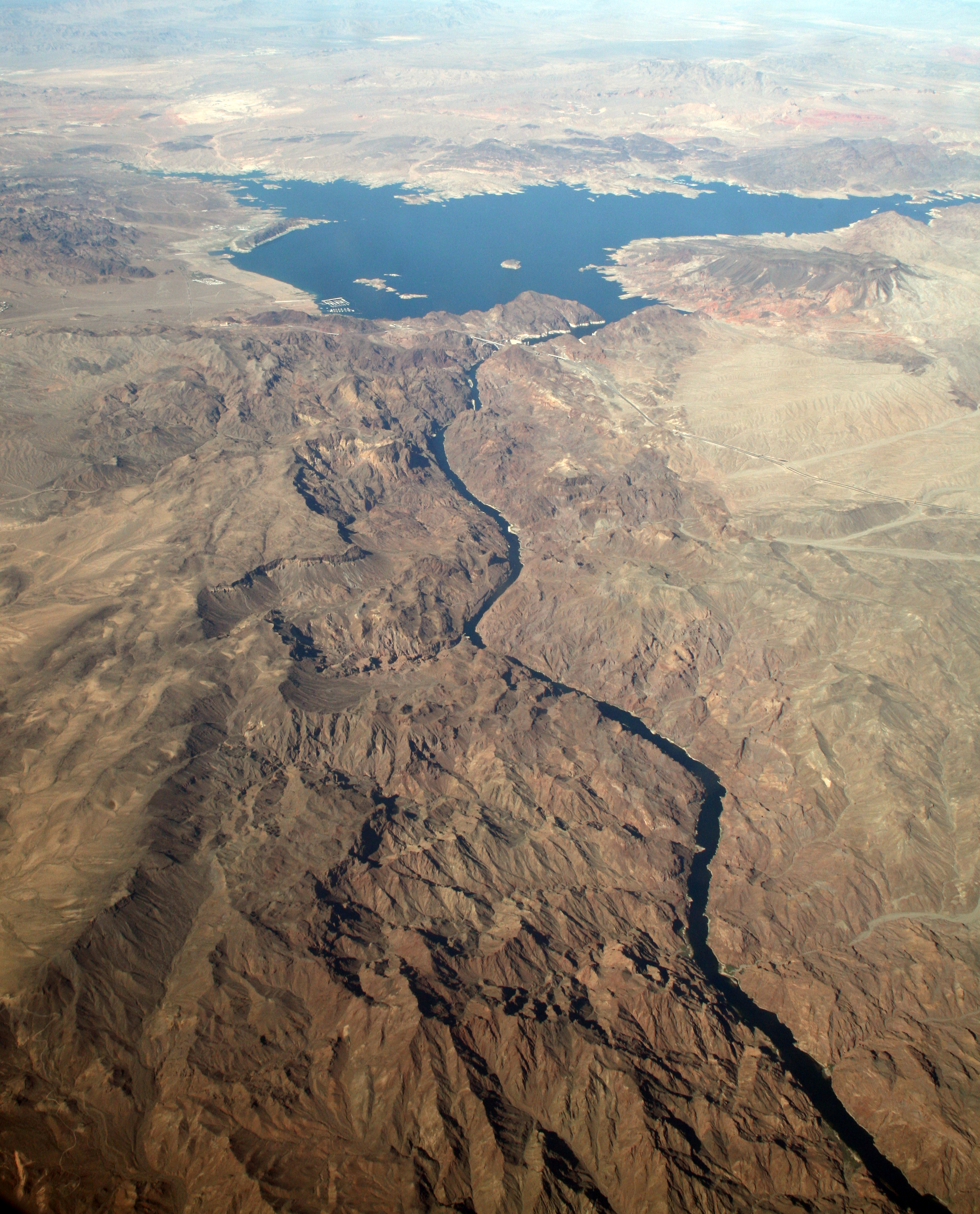
Arid desert areas, with one watercourse, similar to the landscapes of Utapau.

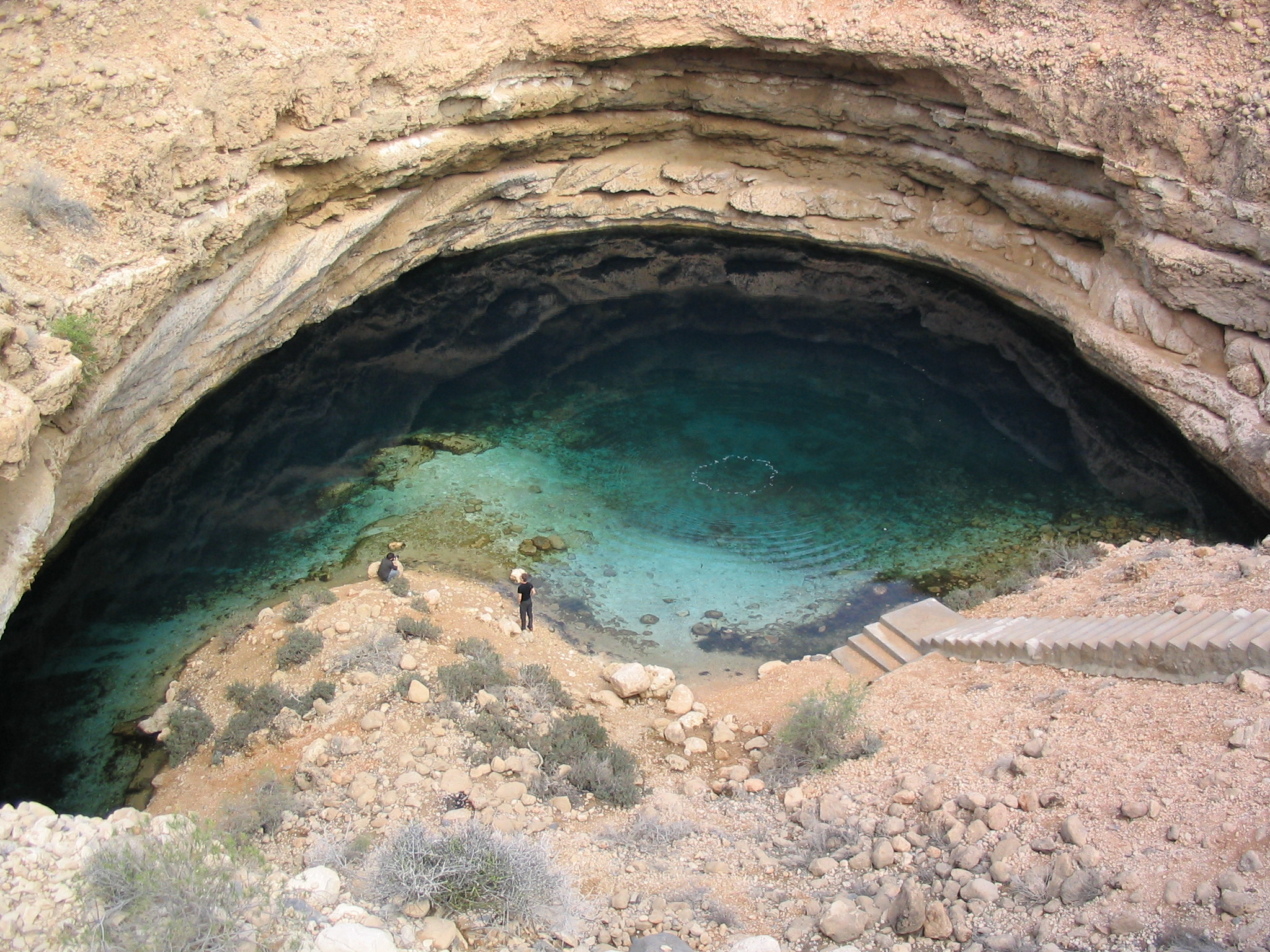
A sinkhole in rocky soil with a body of water at the bottom, similar to those seen on Utapau.

Several representative landscapes of the Utapau area

=== Forms of life ===
==== Intelligent species ====
This planet is home to two intelligent species: the utai and the pau'ans. Collectively known as "utapauns", most of them live in cities within the chasms.

The Utai make up the majority of the Utapau population. Humble by nature, they form the working class of the planet. They generally live in underground caves, thanks to their night vision. They have pedunculated eyes and are small.

The Pau'ans are nicknamed "Ancients" because of their long life expectancy, which is counted in centuries. Carnivores, they have sharp teeth and are large in stature. They have long limbs and no ears. Their eyes are ringed with red, while their skin is grey and cracked. They are closely related to the Utapau fauna, which they have mostly domesticated, and which they use to move around Utapau's rugged surface, or to defend themselves. Although they are a minority on the planet, they are its ruling elite, acting as administrators, diplomats and bureaucrats. They prefer darkness to light, and raw meat to cooked meat. Despite their gruff appearance, they are peaceful and conciliatory. Cooperation between Utais and Pau'ans is essential in Utapau societies, and each species respects and appreciates members of the other.

Utapau is also home to another intelligent species, the amanins. Although they originated on Maridun, many tribes settled on the plains of Utapau, with a more primitive lifestyle, close to that of hunter-gatherers. They rarely ventured into the towns. Tall, lanky bipeds, their skin secretes a poisonous mucus, and their small mouths are filled with sharp teeth. They possess several strange abilities, such as the ability to roll into a perfect ball, enabling them to pursue their prey over long distances, or the ability to give birth to two identical individuals if cut in half.

Some of the most famous people in the Galaxy are from Utapau. One of the best-known representatives of the amanin species is the bounty hunter Amanaman, who frequented the court of the crime lord Jabba the Hutt. As for the pau'an species, one of its best-known representatives is the Grand Inquisitor of the Galactic Empire, formerly a guard at the Jedi Temple.

==== Animal species ====
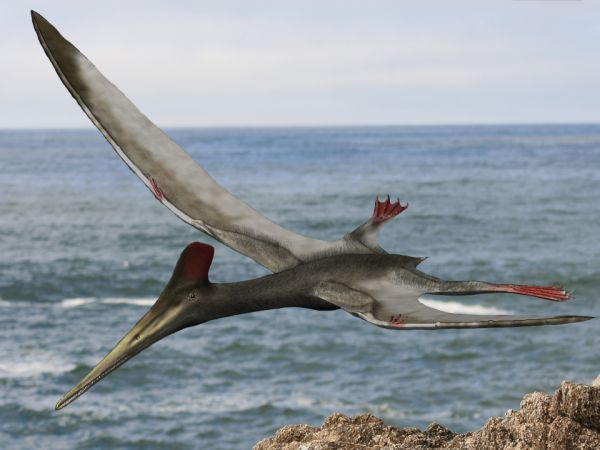
An artist's vision of a pterodactyl, the main source of inspiration for the dactillions, the flying reptiles that populate Utapau.

In addition to the intelligent species that inhabit Utapau, several animal species are endemic to the planet.

Giant spiders, known as ginnthos, can be seen all over the rocky planet, even in the cities of the Utais. They are large, black and purple in colour, and capture their prey.

Other, more peaceful, species of animal were domesticated by the Utais, such as the varactyls, giant lizards with clawed feet that served as mounts for the peoples of the planet. Cold-blooded herbivores, they sport numerous multicoloured feathers.

Winged mounts are also used by the Pau'ans: dactillions. Similar to pterosaurs, they soar through the planet's air using the winds that sweep across it and cling to the walls of wells using their powerful claws.

=== Living and technology ===
Despite the inhospitable surface, the inhabitants of Utapau created cities built on the walls of the underground Utapau caves. These cities grew rich mainly through mining. Precious minerals are found beneath the surface of the planet, in the large underground ocean. The Pau'ans are also experts at harnessing the wind, which they use to power their vertical cities

The planet's main astroport is that of its capital: Pau City. During the Battle of Utapau, the administrator of this port was the pau'an Tion Medon, descendant of the man who unified the different populations of Utapau. Due to the lack of vegetation on the planet's surface, bone is the main building material. This architectural style, known as "ossic", uses the skeletons of various gigantic creatures inhabiting the subterranean ocean to construct the planet's buildings. The bones are used in their raw state, dried or fossilised as required. Utapau's cities, located on the surface of the large chasms covering the planet, often extend several levels below the surface. Several underground passages link the various cities together.

To make it easier for the inhabitants to get around between the planet's crevasses, the large vertical shafts and the rocky mountainsides, Utais and Pau'ans use "motor-wheels ", (Note: The term "wheel bike" is also used.) made up of two cylindrical discs covered with toothed teeth. Generally for civilian use, a motorbike was hijacked by General Grievous for use as a combat vehicle during the Battle of Utapau. The planet also has a space defence force, managed by the administrator of Pau City.

== Official universe ==
=== Clone Wars and the Battle of Utapau ===
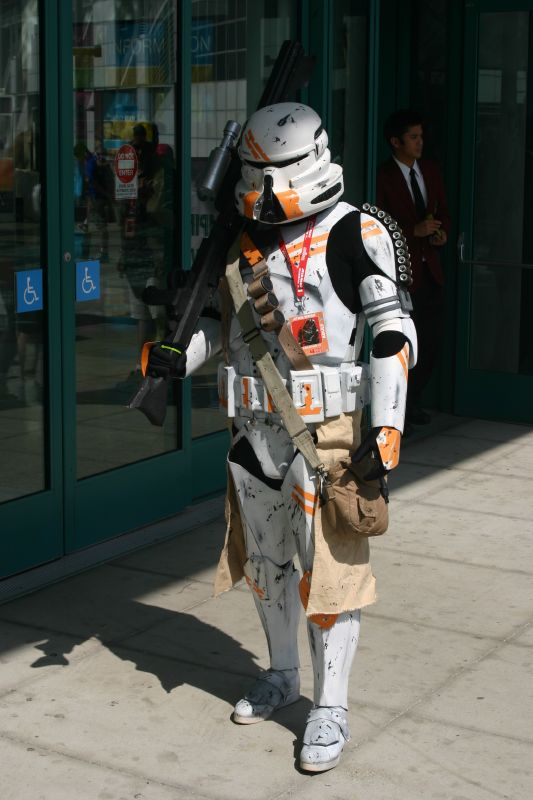
Cosplay of clone troopers present at the Battle of Utapau: a member of the Airborne Infantry

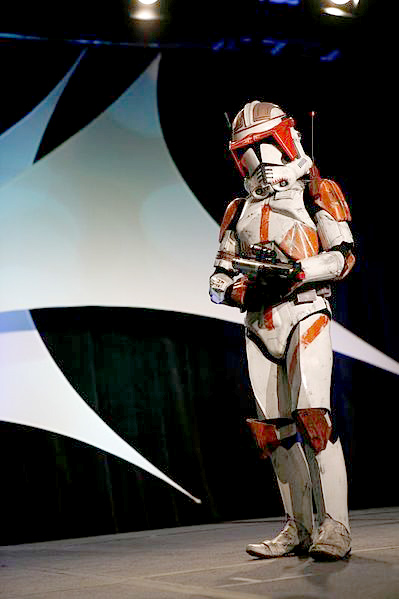
Cosplay of clone troopers present at the Battle of Utapau: Commander Cody

During the Clone Wars, the Jedi learn that a Jedi Master has been found dead in Pau City. Obi-Wan Kenobi and Anakin Skywalker go there and discover that the Confederation of Independent Systems (CSI), an enemy of the Galactic Republic, is linked to the incident. The separatists, led by the cyborg general of the droid armies Grievous, wanted to buy a gigantic kyber crystal from Utapau, the main component of many weapons, including lightsabers. However, the two Jedi decide to destroy the crystal rather than let General Grievous escape with it. This allowed them to deprive the enemy camp of such an advantage.

In 19 BBY, in the final moments of the war, after the Battle of Coruscant and the rout of the Confederacy of Independent Systems, the survivors of the Separatist Council, such as Nute Gunray and Shu Mai, temporarily fled to Utapau. The Confederation's secret leader, Darth Sidious, then orders General Grievous to relocate the Council to Mustafar. Grievous was unable to get there, but the rest of the Council left Utapau for Mustafar.

Chancellor Palpatine, still hiding his secret identity as Darth Sidious, reveals to the Republic the location of the Separatist general and the other leaders of the organisation: the remote world of Utapau. The Jedi Obi-Wan Kenobi was therefore sent there on a mission to stop Grievous. Landing in Pau City, Obi-Wan is informed of the presence of the man he is tracking by Administrator Tion Medon. Medon wants to repel the Separatist presence with the help of the Republic. The Separatists has been occupying Utapau since its recent arrival, although the planet prefers to remain neutral.

The Battle of Utapau, which takes place in the final moments of the Clone Wars, should mark the end of the war. When the Jedi arrive at Utapau to defeat Grievous, the two generals engage in a lightsaber duel that leads to a chase. While Grievous travels by wheel bike, he is chased by Obi-Wan, who has the varactyl Boga as his mount. Having lost his weapon, the Jedi grabs that of his enemy and forces his adversary to leave his vehicle. He ends the confrontation by firing a blaster at the cyborg general, destroying his armor.

Although Grievous' death seemed to mark the end of the war, the leader of the Republic army at Utapau, Commander Cody, was nevertheless ordered by Darth Sidious to betray the Jedi, who were now considered enemies of the Republic. However, Obi-Wan Kenobi, who had fallen into a crater on the planet, managed to escape the soldiers' betrayal. He then left Utapau aboard Grievous' ship, the Soulless One, to go to Coruscant.

=== After the Clone Wars ===
In 13 BBY, Pau'an Fyzen Gor, a medical student, was kidnapped by Utai pirates in Utapau. Desperate for revenge, he decides to build himself a team of droids equipped with organic limbs. Attacked and captured again by pirates, this time amanin, Fyzen Gor resigned himself to working for the pirates for three years. He then left Utapau and designed a weapon, the Phylanx, with which he attempted to take control of the galaxy.

== "Legends" universe ==
Following the takeover of Lucasfilm by The Walt Disney Company, all elements told in derivative products dating prior to 26 April 2014 were declared to be outside of canon and were then grouped together as "Star Wars Legends ".

=== Before the imperial era ===
As major storms swept across the surface of Utapau, the Utais built underground dwellings. As the storms intensified, the Pau'ans also eventually settled in the chasms. A military defence fleet was set up, but Utapau remained as neutral as possible during the Clone Wars.

=== After the Clone Wars ===
The army of the Galactic Republic eventually occupied Utapau as the Galactic Empire emerged. The Emperor then set up one of his secret warehouses there. Initially, the planet was ruled by an Imperial leader. Later, the human Fey family took control of Utapau. Once liberated, the planet decided to join the New Republic.

== Concept and creation ==
=== Origin of the concept ===
The name of the planet Utapau appears as early as George Lucas's first drafts, when he wrote the first draft of the narrative for Star Wars, in May 1974. The main character in this draft, Annikin, was living in hiding on a desert planet called Utapau, with his brother and father. Although the name of the desert planet was later changed to Tatooine, the original name was retained for the planet riddled with wells that served as the setting for the duel between Obi-Wan Kenobi and the separatist general Grievous.

The first concept art for Utapau was created by Terryl Whitlatch in March 1995, depicting the planet as a Byzantine style paradise and a central location in the upcoming prequel film. The name Utapau was once again dropped, and the paradisiacal aesthetic formed the basis of what would become Naboo. The next sketches of the planet Utapau were made in June 2002 by Erik Tiemens, a concept artist working on Revenge of the Sith. The concept for the planet Utapau came from ideas that had not been used for the planet Geonosis, featured in Attack of the Clones. Indeed, Erik Tiemens wanted to incorporate mud puddles or springs into this desert planet, ideas rejected by George Lucas, who wanted "something dry ". These ideas were nevertheless retained, and were used in the design of the Utapau planet. To complete his initial idea, Tiemens then added a surface riddled with wells and sinkholes, in which rotting water stagnated. For the architecture of the pau'ans, Tiemens drew inspiration from some of Ralph McQuarrie's unused drawings. Like several planets in the Star Wars universe, Utapau's architecture was inspired by the American architect Frank Lloyd Wright, creating a modern, technological atmosphere that is fully integrated into its natural environment.

=== Creation of the inhabitants ===
The first concepts of utapauns were those of a hairy, lemur-like species. George Lucas came up with the idea, wanting very fragile creatures in a very fragile world. Several preparatory drawings of these people were made, before the idea was abandoned. Lee Sang-jun, artist on the film Revenge of the Sith, then recycled a concept representing the inhabitants of the planet Mustafar, large humanoids dressed in purple robes, organised around a religious society, for the design of the Pau'ans, at the request of George Lucas, who greatly appreciated the concept. These creatures were transposed to Utapau and given a more important role in the film's story.

The Pau'ans are created with a mixture of make-up, prosthetics and digital effects, and were always intended to be physical characters. Bruce Spence, who plays Tion Medon, reports that the make-up took over four hours to apply and over an hour to remove. Coupled with modern prosthetics, this make-up allows the actor to show more facial expressions. Although only a male version of the make-up can be seen in the film, several tests were also carried out on female versions. The utais, a smaller species than the pau'ans, are generated entirely in computer-generated images.

Boga, Obi-Wan Kenobi's tame varactyl, was imagined and designed entirely in computer-generated images by Industrial Light & Magic's special effects department. Knowing that the animal was going to be seen up close, Kevin Reuter, supervisor of the company's art department, decided to give it large, expressive eyes, and worked with Rob Coleman from the digital animation department to bring the creature to life. Several poses were created for the creature, to give it a powerful yet dynamic look during the chase against General Grievous. The preparatory sketches that inspired Boga are drawings by Al Williamson, who worked on the original trilogy, depicting several stormtroopers on giant lizards. Saga sound designer Ben Burtt created the varactyl sounds by combining bird chirps and a steam locomotive whistle.

=== Models and inlay ===
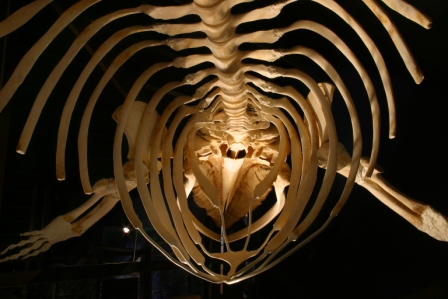
A cetacean skeleton, the inspiration for Utapau's architecture

As with many of the planets in Revenge of the Sith, Utapau's background is made up of a mixture of real images and computer-generated images, or "digital paintings", in reference to cache painting. Most of the discussions between the administrators of Pau City and Obi-Wan Kenobi are filmed in the Fox studios in Sydney, on a blue screen, before a background is added.

The landscapes of Utapau were also created from scale models, to which digital effects were later added, under the supervision of Brian Gernand, ILM's head of models. To give the models a three-dimensional look, this work was carried out in close collaboration with the film's art department61. Two large scale models, at different scales, were built: one representing one of the planet's wells, created at the two-hundredth scale and measuring 5.50 m by 1.80 m, and another reconfigurable model representing Pau City, created at the ninetieth scale and measuring 4.80 m by 7.30 m. Thousands of architectural structures were moulded before being hand-painted, then inserted around the crevices, cut out using copper engraving or a laser. The bone structures representing the architecture of Utapau are built in such a way that they can be dismantled and then reassembled in different ways to create other buildings. The entire model is covered in miniature spotlights, which highlight certain details of the buildings. Some of the bulbs measure less than a millimetre, but are needed to illuminate the model. It was filmed in two stages, first intact for the shots of Obi-Wan Kenobi's arrival on the planet, and then after several parts of the model had been twisted, burnt and broken, for the shots of the battle.

To allow a high level of detail, the model representing Utapau's main shaft is made entirely of foam. In order to simulate the flaked rock appearance of the shaft, wax mixed with clay was then brushed over the entire model, before a few bushes were added. Foam board models were used to obtain scale references. Several digital models are then added to complete the landscape. Inhabitants were also modelled on the basis of actors who had already been made up.

For scenes requiring interaction with CGI-generated local wildlife, actor Ewan McGregor was filmed sitting on a mechanical saddle attached to a hydraulic dial, both of which were replaced by CGI in post-production. A Komodo monitor served as the model for the animation of Boga, Obi-Wan Kenobi's mount.

=== Incomplete adaptation in animation ===
The planet Utapau should have made an appearance in the animated series The Clone Wars. In the story arc, Jedi Obi-Wan Kenobi and Anakin Skywalker investigate the death of another Jedi on Utapau, which leads to the discovery of a new Separatist weapon designed by General Grievous. Despite the premature end of the series, numerous concept images detailing the architecture, wildlife and inhabitants of the planet were created.

As some of the animation and dubbing of the episodes had already been done when the series was discontinued, it is possible to access the preparatory work for these episodes, which has been posted online, in order to discover the narrative framework.

== Adaptations ==
=== Video games ===
As a planet in the Star Wars universe, Utapau appears in several video games.

Utapau is featured in the 2005 video game adaptation of Revenge of the Sith, in a level where the player takes on the role of Obi-Wan Kenobi, first battling General Grievous before fleeing the planet after Order 66. Utapau is one of the terrains in which the player can fight in the 2005 game Star Wars: Battlefront II. As in the film, battle droids face off against clone troopers.

Also in 2005, Utapau is one of the planets that can be visited in Lego Star Wars: The Video Game, with a level featuring the Battle of Utapau. It also features in the game's re-adaptations, Lego Star Wars: The Complete Saga in 2007 and Lego Star Wars: The Skywalker Saga in 2022 69,70.

=== Figurines ===
Lego produces action figures depicting scenes set in Utapau. In 2005, the box number 7255 General Grievous Chase was released. It includes a motorbike figure and one of the varactyl Boga, along with two character figures: one of Grievous and one of Obi-Wan Kenobi. The number 7656 General Grievous Starfighter, released two years later, includes as the name suggests an interceptor figure and one of Grievous. In 2014, issue 75036 Utapau Troopers was released, including a Separatist droid figure as well as four clone figures. The same year also saw the release of number 75040 General Grievous Wheel Bike. It includes a motorbike figure and two of the characters: Grievous and Obi-Wan Kenobi again note γ. Finally, in 2020, number 75286 General Grievous's Starfighter went on sale. It includes a figure of Grievous's ship, as well as three character figures: one of Grievous, one of Obi-Wan Kenobi and one of a clone trooper.

Several figurines featuring the inhabitants of Utapau were also marketed by Hasbro to coincide with the release of the film Revenge of the Sith in 2005.

In 2005, several models of Utapau were presented at a Star Wars exhibition at the Cité des sciences et de l'industrie at the Porte de la Villette in Paris.

== Reception and posterity ==
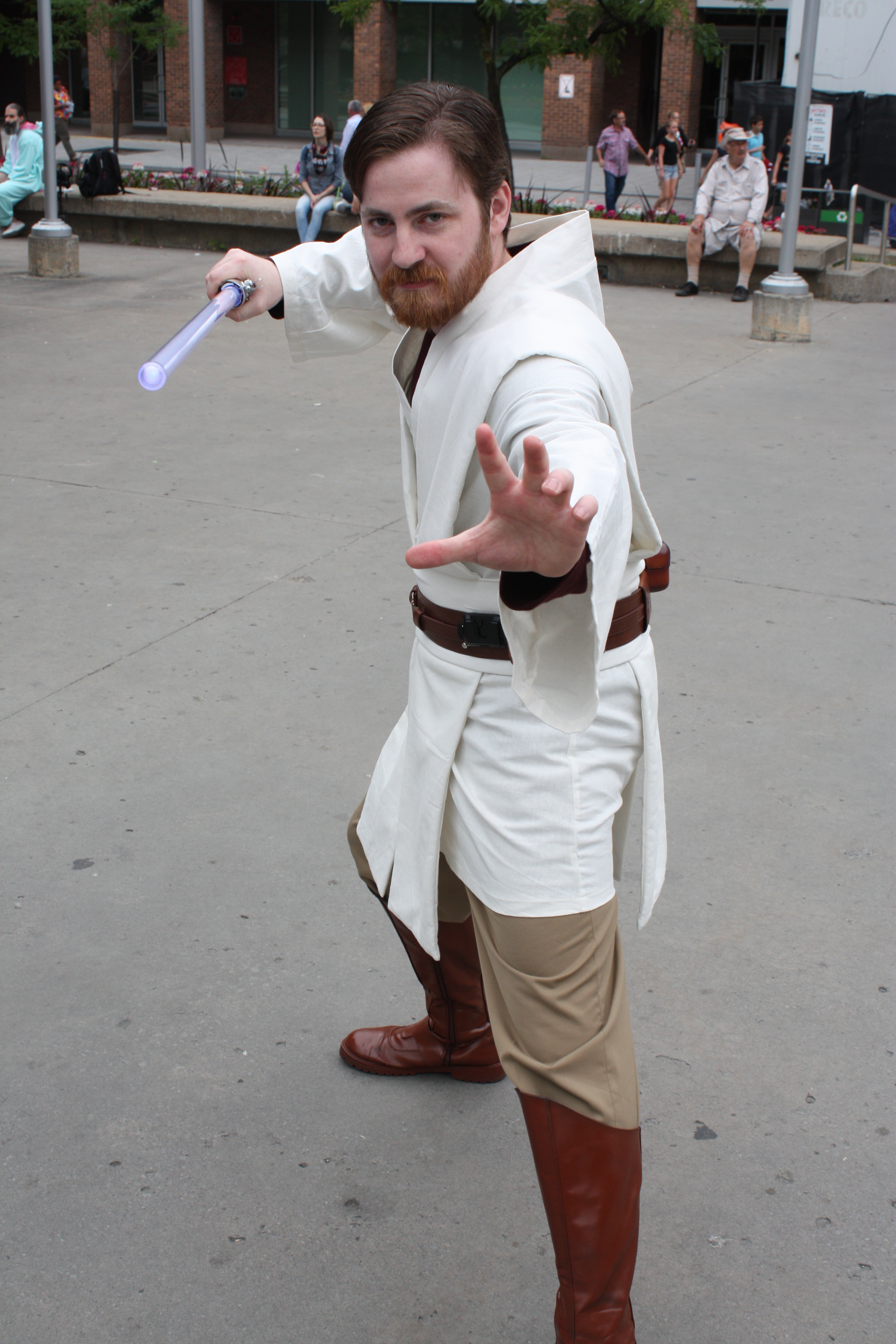
Jedi Obi-Wan Kenobi known for the war on Utapau

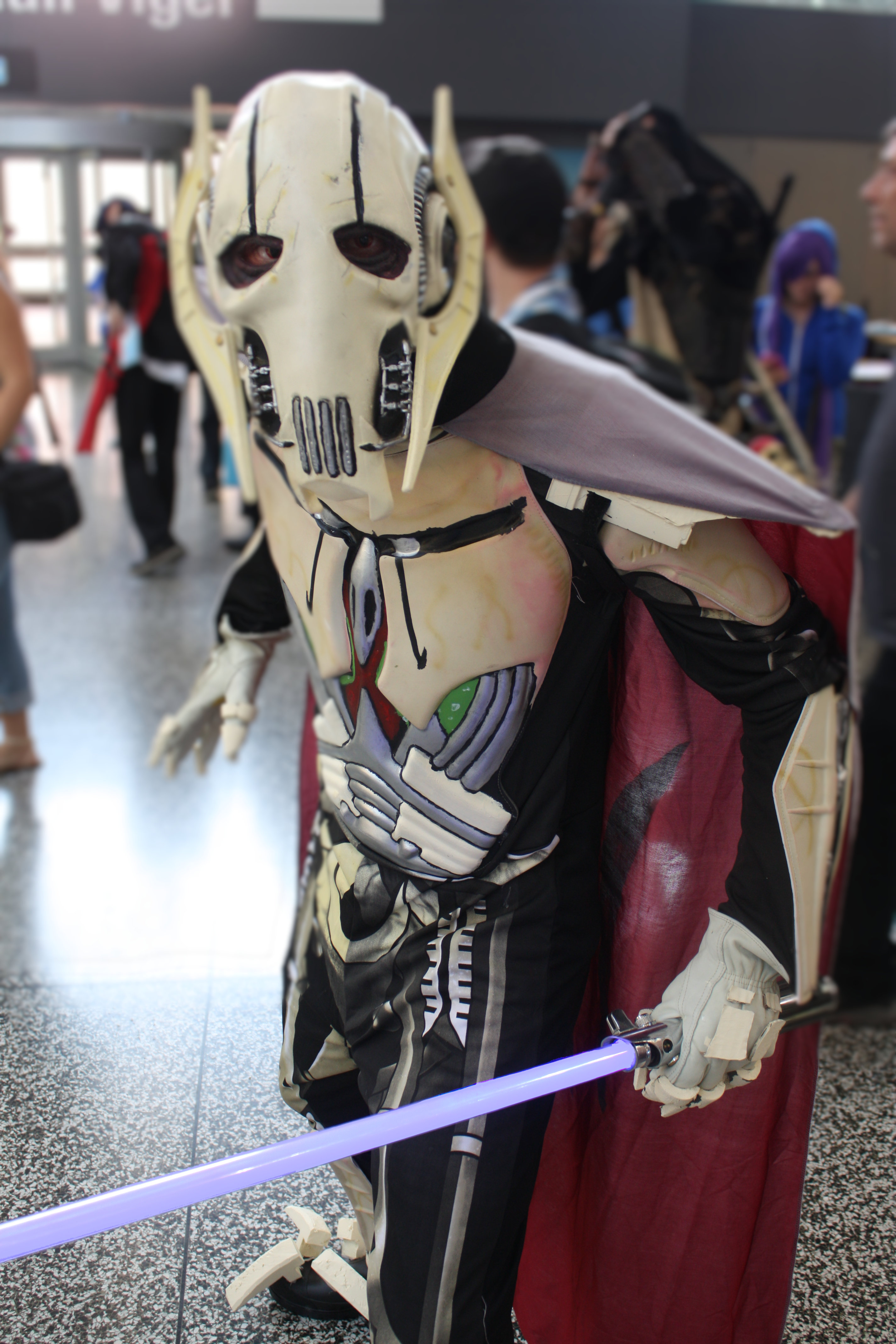
Separatist cyborg general Grievous known for the war on Utapau

The scenes that take place in Utapau, and in particular the lines associated with them, are the source of many Internet memes. One of the most notable scenes in this situation is the one that precedes the duel between the Jedi Obi-Wan Kenobi and the separatist Grievous. Obi-Wan's "Hello there!" followed by General Grievous "General Kenobi, you are a bold one" is ranked as the character's best line by the Screen Rant website. Similarly, the specialist website Comic Book Resources ranked the duel between Obi-Wan and General Grievous as the ninth best lightsaber duel in the saga.

The Allociné website describes it as "a strange planet, lost in the outer rim of the galaxy". In particular, it highlights the fact that Obi-Wan decides to pursue Grievous to such an unusual world, far from the centre of the Galaxy.

The lemur-like appearance originally intended for the Utapauns was adopted for the lurmens eventually present in The Clone Wars television series.

The chase scene in which Obi-Wan rides a varactyl was also the inspiration for a similar scene in the ninth episode of the saga: Star Wars, Episode IX: The Skywalker Ascension. In the latter, Finn rides horse-like orbaks to attack the ships of the Last Order.

== See also ==
- Star Wars
- List of Star Wars planets and moons
