= Toola =

تولہ
- Village
- Tola
- Location within Pakistan
- Coordinates: 32°18′04″N 75°04′14″E
- Country: Pakistan
- Province: Punjab
- District: Narowal District
- Tehsil: Shakargarh Tehsil

Area
  - Total: 200 km^{2} (77 sq mi)
- Time zone: UTC+5 (PST)
- Postal code span: 51800
- Area code: 0542

Toola (Urdu: تولہ ) is a village in the administrative Tehsil Shakargarh, District Narowal Pakistan. The village is located between 2 tehsils of Narowal city Zafarwal and Shakargarh.

== Demographics ==
The area of the village is approximately 200 square kilometers. The village has a Primary School for Girls and Boys separately organized by the Government of the Punjab. Despite having over 2,000 eligible voters, the roads in this village remain in terrible condition and have not been repaired for the past 15 years. This is primarily due to the negligence of the local MNAs and MPAs, as well as the lack of demand and advocacy from the residents.

== Health Unit ==
The village Toola has the one basic Health unit run and organized by the Government of Punjab, Pakistan.

== Education ==
Village Toola has two elementary schools for boys and girls separately, Government Elementary School for Boys(I to VIII grade) and Government Elementary School for Girls(I to VIII grade) organized by the Government of the Punjab.
