= Star Wars Jedi Knight: Jedi Academy =

2003 video game

- North American Windows cover art
- Developer: Raven Software (Note: Additional development for the multiplayer component by Threewave Software.) (Note: Vicarious Visions developed the Xbox version, while Aspyr developed the Mac OS X, Nintendo Switch, and PlayStation 4 versions.)
- Publishers: NA: LucasArts; WW: Activision (Note: Aspyr published the Mac OS X, Nintendo Switch, and PlayStation 4 versions. THQ Nordic published the retail Nintendo Switch and PlayStation 4 versions.)
- Directors: Steve Raffel; Jon Zuk
- Designer: Christopher Foster
- Programmer: James Monroe
- Artist: Les Dorscheid
- Series: Star Wars: Jedi Knight
- Engine: id Tech 3
- Platforms: Windows; Xbox; Mac OS X; Nintendo Switch; PlayStation 4
- Release: September 16, 2003: Windows; NA: September 16, 2003; EU: September 19, 2003; AU: September 24, 2003 Xbox; NA: November 18, 2003; EU: November 21, 2003; AU: December 4, 2003 Mac OS X; NA: December 16, 2003 Switch, PS4; WW: March 26, 2020
- Genres: First-person shooter; third-person shooter; hack and slash
- Modes: Single-player, multiplayer

Star Wars Jedi Knight: Jedi Academy is a 2003 first- and third-person shooter video game developed by Raven Software and published by LucasArts for Windows, Mac OS X and Xbox. Vicarious Visions was responsible for the development of the Xbox version. The game is a sequel to 2002's Star Wars Jedi Knight II: Jedi Outcast and the fourth and final installment in the Star Wars: Jedi Knight series. The single-player story, set in the fictional Star Wars expanded universe two years after Jedi Outcast, follows Jaden Korr, a new student at Luke Skywalker's Jedi Academy under the tutelage of the previous games' protagonist, Kyle Katarn. As Jaden, players are tasked with investigating a Dark Jedi cult called the Disciples of Ragnos, while slowly learning the ways of the Force and committing themselves to either the light side or the dark side.

Jedi Academy uses the same game engine as Jedi Outcast, the id Tech 3, but features several technical improvements. Like Jedi Outcast, the game combines shooter elements with hack and slash combat, allowing players to wield blasters, lightsabers and a variety of Force powers. The lightsaber combat has been slightly improved and both the player and enemies can now wield standard, double-bladed or dual lightsabers. In addition to customizing their lightsaber and Force powers, players can also modify Jaden's appearance, choosing their species, gender and clothing. Jedi Academy also features a multiplayer mode that allows players to compete in several different game modes online or over a local area network.

Jedi Academy received positive reviews upon release. In September 2009, the game was re-released onto Steam and Direct2Drive alongside the rest of the Jedi Knight series. A Nintendo Switch and PlayStation 4 port was announced in September 2019 and published by Aspyr in March 2020.

== Gameplay ==
As a first and third-person shooter set in the Star Wars expanded universe, Jedi Academy puts the player into combat wielding a variety of firearms from that universe, as well as lightsabers and Force powers. While using long-range, a player can choose between first-person and third-person perspectives, using a variety of projectile and energy weapons. Players have a health meter and a shield meter, which are replenished separately.

Jedi Academy places a heavy emphasis on lightsaber combat. The player can create a custom lightsaber by selecting a hilt and one of five blade colors. After the first few missions, the player is allowed to choose a new lightsaber fighting style ("fast" or "strong") and can switch between that style and the original "medium" style at any time. Later in the game, the player can choose to learn the third fighting style, or wield one saber in each hand, or wield a "saber staff" similar to the double ended lightsaber Darth Maul used in The Phantom Menace.

=== Single-player ===
The player initially chooses the character's species and gender, and begins the game with a single lightsaber. Most of the game is divided into three batches of five missions each. Out of each batch, the player may skip one mission and do the other four in any order, or may do all five in any order. These batches of missions are preceded by a mandatory training course and connected by mandatory missions: Acts 1 and 2 are connected by missions set on Hoth while Acts 2 and 3 are connected by missions set in Bast castle on the planet V'jun. At the end of the Hoth missions, the player may choose a new single-bladed lightsaber fighting style, and at the end of the V'jun/Bast missions, the player is allowed access to dual-wielding or to a saber staff.

At the beginning of each optional mission, the player can choose one of their Force skills to upgrade, either developing light or dark Force skills (e.g., mind tricks or choking grasp). This will increase the impact of that Force power, thus making the character more powerful as the game progresses. The climactic final battle changes depending on which side of the Force the player is. The game introduces single vehicle-based level and player-controllable vehicles/mounts, including a tauntaun and a AT-ST.

=== Multiplayer ===
A multiplayer game where a flag carrier redirects a rocket using the Force

In multiplayer mode, one can play online or via a local area network (LAN) with other players, as well as computer-controlled bots. In line with other online-enabled games on the Xbox, multiplayer on Xbox Live was available to players until April 15, 2010. Star Wars Jedi Knight: Jedi Academy is now playable online again on the replacement Xbox Live servers called Insignia. The player can create their avatar using a series of options, similar to the character creation in single-player. Alternatively the player can choose to play as one of almost all of the characters from Jedi Outcast and Jedi Academy. Before a match begins, the server specifies the Force ranking to be used; this controls how many points the players have to invest in different Force powers. Players can then customize their powers for the match. The server can also disable normal weapons to create a lightsaber-only game. There are different multiplayer modes such as "Capture the flag", "Power Duel" and "Siege". Depending on the mode, players can play on their own or as part of a team. In comparison with the single-player gameplay, multiplayer requires a high level of skill and can have a steep learning curve, as stated by many. There are six multiplayer modes in total, but the most popular and most willingly modified is the "Free For All".

Some time after its release the online community has started to slowly decline. Upon its 2019 re-launch, the game developers expected to attract new players and revive the online mode. A number of multiplayer modifications have been released, such as Movie Battles II.

== Plot ==
Jedi Academy is set in 14 ABY, a decade after Return of the Jedi and two years after Jedi Outcast. Players take on the role of Jaden Korr (voiced by Philip Tanzini if male and Jennifer Hale if female), a talented Jedi Padawan who, after building their own lightsaber, travels to the Jedi Academy on Yavin IV to learn the ways of the Force. En route to the Academy, Jaden befriends fellow student Rosh Penin (Jason Marsden), but the students' shuttle is suddenly shot down by an unknown enemy. Jaden and Rosh make their way to the Academy, where the former witnesses a woman using a staff to drain energy from the Temple; Jaden subsequently gets knocked out. Jaden is woken by Luke Skywalker (Bob Bergen) and Kyle Katarn (Jeff Bennett), who welcome them to the Academy. Jaden and Rosh are assigned to study under Kyle, but during their first training session, Rosh's over-competitiveness endangers Jaden. After the Jedi students complete their initial training, they are assigned various peace-keeping missions across the galaxy. During this time, Rosh becomes jealous of Jaden and begins to believe Kyle is trying to hold him back.

After several successful missions, Luke calls the students back to the Academy to tell them he has identified the Dark Jedi who attacked the Temple as members of a Sith cult called the Disciples of Ragnos. A member of the cult, the Twi'lek Alora (Grey DeLisle), infiltrated the Academy during the attack and stole Luke's journal, containing the locations of numerous places strong with the Force. Believing the cult is looking to drain their Force energy, Luke sends the students to investigate each location. Jaden travels to Hoth, where they find Imperial presence at the Rebel Alliance's abandoned Echo Base and encounter Alora, who flees after a brief duel. Returning to the Academy, Jaden reports their findings, but is saddened to learn Rosh never returned from his mission to Byss.

After Jaden completes more missions and has several run-ins with the Disciples, they and Kyle travel to Darth Vader's abandoned fortress on Vjun—one of the few places strong with the Force supposedly unvisited by the Disciples—and find it crawling with stormtroopers and Dark Jedi. The pair fight them, but are eventually separated. Jaden encounters Rosh, who has fallen to the dark side and joined the Disciples to avoid being killed after they had captured him. Jaden defeats Rosh as Kyle arrives, but both are incapacitated by Tavion Axmis (Kath Soucie), the Disciples' leader and Rosh's new master. (Note: Tavion was also featured as a secondary antagonist in Jedi Outcast. She was the apprentice of the main antagonist, Desann, whom Kyle defeated and spared, leading her to swear revenge on him for humiliating her.) Tavion uses the Scepter of Ragnos, which can absorb and release Force energy, to trap Jaden and Kyle under debris, but the pair manage to escape, though the former's lightsaber is destroyed in the process. At the Academy, Jaden and Kyle inform Luke of their findings, and the former is honored for their actions by being promoted to the rank of Jedi Knight.

After building a new lightsaber, Jaden begins dismantling the Disciples' operations as they complete more missions, while Luke discovers that Tavion plans to use the stolen Force energy to resurrect the ancient Sith Lord Marka Ragnos (Peter Lurie), who is buried on Korriban. While the Jedi prepare to go there, Kyle convinces Jaden to accompany him to a mining facility on Taspir III, from where Rosh has sent a distress signal. The pair split up and Jaden eventually finds Rosh, who claims he wants to redeem himself, but Jaden's feelings of betrayal quickly manifest into anger. Alora tries to goad them into killing Rosh and joining the Disciples, while Kyle senses Jaden's anger and tries to telepathically dissuade them. If the player chooses the light side, Jaden forgives Rosh, but an enraged Alora attacks them and cuts off the latter's arm. If the player chooses the dark side, Jaden kills Rosh, but refuses to join the Disciples, instead seeking the Scepter's power for themself. Either way, Jaden kills Alora and leaves for Korriban.

Jaden fights their way to Ragnos' tomb, where they confront Tavion and defeat her. If Jaden is light-sided, they spare Tavion, who completes the resurrection process, causing Ragnos' spirit to possess her. Jaden destroys the Scepter and defeats Ragnos, who leaves Tavion's lifeless body and returns to his tomb. At the Academy, Jaden reunites with Rosh, who has been outfitted with a prosthetic arm, and is honored by Luke, Kyle and the other Jedi. If Jaden is dark-sided, they kill Tavion and claim the Scepter as Kyle arrives to confront them, but Jaden defeats him and buries him under debris. They later take command of Tavion's Star Destroyer, while Kyle is rescued by Luke and vows to hunt Jaden down, though Luke assures him that there is still good in their fallen apprentice.

== Production ==
=== Development ===
After Jedi Outcast was completed, LucasArts immediately approached Raven Software to develop a sequel. Production began and Raven was given a one-year development cycle. Like Jedi Outcast, Jedi Academy uses a heavily modified Quake III: Team Arena game engine, and the development team was made up of people who worked on Jedi Outcast, as well as Star Trek: Voyager – Elite Force.

At the start of the game players choose the gender, alien race and clothing of their character.

An early decision made during development was whether or not to have Kyle Katarn as the playable character. This was due to the character already being a powerful Jedi Knight, and, as such, starting off with the Force skills would affect the gameplay. To resolve this issue, Raven chose to make the playable character a student in the Jedi Academy. By using a completely new character, the developers were able to insert features that allowed the player to customize the character, including race and gender, as well as the lightsaber color, hilt and type. The Kyle Katarn character was then made an instructor in the academy so as to remain integral to the plot, to ensure Jedi Academy built upon the existing Jedi Knight series storyline. Raven extended the customization further as the game progresses by allowing the player to choose specific Force powers to train upon completion of missions. This was done with the intention of giving freedom to choose the way and style the game is played.

Another decision made early on was to include locations and aspects from the Star Wars movies. The designers wanted to use locations such as Tatooine and Hoth, as well as the Rancor creature. To develop the map for Hoth, the designers obtained as much source material from The Empire Strikes Back as possible so to create an authentic reproduction. Level Designer Justin Negrete says that Hoth was one of the most challenging areas to design. The general level design process started by planning out the level on paper. These ideas were then "fleshed out" to get the size and flow of the level. Once this had been done, features of the Quake III engine were used to add more detail such as lighting effects. The final stage of level design was adding aspects that improved the gameplay and fun of the level.

The mission based format of Jedi Academy was used by Raven to reduce the linearity of the game, allowing the players to progress through levels mostly in the order they desire. Further reduction in linearity was achieved by requiring only 80% of levels to be completed before the plot can move on, the rest being optional. Raven provided modding tools with Jedi Academy, but the company specified that such tools are unsupported by customer support, so to avoid receiving calls on the subject. Brett Tosti, a producer for LucasArts, stated that the customization of the player that is provided by the game out of the box will mean that people are less likely to need to create their own "skins". Additional textures and skins nevertheless became popular leading Mike Gummelt, who designed the lightsaber combat system in Outcast and Academy, to declare "the community really owns the game now". The community's continued interest has led some more recent reviews to conclude that Jedi Academy has a lightsaber engine superior to those developed before or since.

=== Release ===
The game was published and distributed within North America by LucasArts. Activision took control of publishing and distributing the game in all other territories worldwide. The game was released for Windows and Mac OS X (published by Aspyr) on September 16, 2003, and for Xbox (developed by Vicarious Visions) in November 2003, and received positive reviews.

In September 2009, the game was re-released with the other Star Wars: Jedi Knight games (Star Wars: Dark Forces, Star Wars Jedi Knight: Dark Forces II, Star Wars Jedi Knight: Mysteries of the Sith and Star Wars Jedi Knight II: Jedi Outcast) through the digital distributor Steam and Direct2Drive.

The original Xbox version of Jedi Academy was one of the six Star Wars titles made available on Xbox One via backward compatibility in April 2018. On January 29, 2019, Major Nelson announced that Jedi Academy will be available as part of Xbox's Games with Gold program from February 16 to February 28.

On September 19, 2019, it was announced that Jedi Academy would be rereleased on PlayStation 4 and the Nintendo Switch in "early" 2020, to follow the rerelease of Jedi Outcast for the same platforms in December 2019. On March 26, 2020, Jedi Academy was released on PlayStation 4 and the Nintendo Switch with updated controls for modern hardware and a fully functional multiplayer component directly mirroring the original's.

=== Source-code release ===
Following Disney's decision to close LucasArts on April 3, 2013, the developers at Raven Software released the source code for the game on SourceForge under GNU GPL-2.0-only. A few days after release, the source code disappeared from SourceForge without explanation. SourceForge later explained to media outlet Kotaku that Raven Software had requested its removal. Kotaku speculated this was due to the presence of licensed code, such as for the Bink Video format from Rad Game Tools, that was not intended to be made public. Based on the source release from Raven, Jedi Academy is maintained by the JACoders group as OpenJK.

== Reception ==
Reception

Aggregate scores
Aggregator	Score	
Aggregator	PC	Xbox
GameRankings	80%	75%
Metacritic	81/100	76/100

Review scores
Publication	Score	
Publication	PC	Xbox
1Up.com		B−
Eurogamer	7/10	6/10
Game Informer	8.5/10	8/10
GameSpot	8.4/10	8.1/10
GameZone	9/10	8.2/10
IGN	8.8/10	8/10
Official Xbox Magazine (UK)		7.7./10
Official Xbox Magazine (US)		7/10
PC Gamer (UK)	70/100	
PC Gamer (US)	86/100	
PC Zone	89/100	
TeamXbox		3.5/5

Both the PC and Xbox versions of the game were well received. The PC version holds an aggregate score of 81 out of 100 on Metacritic based on 34 reviews, and 80% on GameRankings based on 51 reviews. The Xbox version holds aggregate scores of 76 out of 100 on Metacritic based on 30 reviews, and 75% on GameRankings based on 45 reviews.

=== PC ===
Positive reviews praised the fact that, unlike in Dark Forces II and Jedi Outcast, players could use a lightsaber from the beginning. Game Over Online scored the game 92% and commented that "You start instantly with your lightsaber, rather than wading through six painfully bland FPS levels to get your lightsaber as you did in Jedi Outcast". Critics lauded the lightsaber interface and player customization options. Ernie Halal of Gaming Age gave the game an A−, writing, "You choose not only the gender and race of your character, but also which powers and fighting styles to develop [...] Third person adventure games rarely offer that much customization."

Critics noted that, despite its age, the Quake III engine was used well. PC Gamer UK, which scored the game 70 out of 100, wrote "the engine, which although hardly groundbreaking any more, perfectly evokes the glow of the lightsaber and the grimy, metallic backgrounds of the films." Some critics did, however, note that the engine was starting to look dated.

The multiplayer, in particular the objective-based Siege mode, was well received. The music, sound effects and voice acting also received acclaim, although some critics found it odd that all aliens spoke English.

The story and level design received mixed reactions. Some critics commended the levels as varied (both in terms of length and content). GameZone scored the game 9 out of 10, writing "Some are a fast blast that can be beat in ten or so minutes. Others [...] can take as long as hours [...] The change of pace is very refreshing." The story was described as "great" by GameZone and as "strong" by Gaming Age. IGN's Steve Butts, however, disliked the plot, feeling that "Jedi Outcast was more satisfying in terms of involvement with the story. Jedi Academy dishes out more action sooner but fails to put it in as solid a context as the previous game."

Game Over Online was critical of the mission structure, writing "This kind of free-form mission assignment [...] only serves to weaken the plotline. It also leads to a disjointedness to the missions [...] it seems more like roaming than any actual story advancement." GameSpot's Craig Beers, however, praised the mission structure; "Jedi Academy does an excellent job of balancing its missions." IGN also defended the system; "It's nice that the game offers a series of fairly short, relatively unconnected missions at the start. It's a great way to get your feet wet and ease you in to the environments and the saber fighting before the challenge level ramps up."

The AI was criticized by PC Gamer UK as "laughable"; "Every encounter you have is filled with people too stupid to realise that running away or taking some sort of cover would be the best option. [Jedi Academy] requires little to no skill to play through." This opinion was echoed by GameSpot: "Stormtroopers usually just stand there shooting away at you [...] Dark Jedi rush at you, even after watching four of their brethren plummet to a horrible death. Occasionally, you'll see an enemy accidentally commit suicide by falling off a cliff or falling into lava, enemies will not even dive for cover or try and throw it back if you throw an uncooked thermal detonator at them."

Despite his criticism of the AI, GameSpot's Craig Beers scored the game 8.4 out of 10, writing "It manages to take all the fun parts from its predecessor and greatly expands them to create an engaging, new action game in its own right." IGN's Steve Butts scored the game 8.8 out of 10, giving it an "Editor's Choice Award" and writing "If you like Star Wars and think flipping around chopping up Stormtroopers and flinging Dark Jedi off of conveniently placed precipices is fun, then this game is definitely for you." Eurogamer's Kristan Reed was less impressed, scoring the game 7 out of 10, writing "The harsh reality is, for all the plentiful additions, there's much work to be done before LucasArts can boast it has created the ultimate Star Wars FPS. Sure, it's the best one yet, but with some often laughable AI and creaking tech underpinning it, the flaws are there for all to see."

=== Xbox ===
Kevin Gifford of 1Up.com scored the Xbox version a B−. He lauded the addition of Xbox Live support and the ability to use a lightsaber from the opening, two of biggest criticisms of Jedi Outcast. However, he called the graphics "worryingly out of date by current Xbox standards", saying that when playing in first-person mode "the game looks more like a two-year-old PC shooter than a modern Star Wars game." He concluded that "The Xbox Live games make Jedi Academy worth at least a rental to online players, but otherwise, this game's worth it to Star Wars fans only." Eurogamer's Kristan Reed was also somewhat unimpressed, scoring the game 6 out of 10 and criticizing the controls; "In common with the PC version, you still find yourself going into battle and fumbling furiously through cyclical menus while numerous baddies are busy blasting seven shades out of you." She was also critical of the AI and the graphics, concluding that "It's good to see Live make the package this time around, but we're disappointed that after all these years LucasArts is still scratching around abusing the Star Wars brand in this way. There are some good ideas here that haven't been realised, and we're once again left waiting for the definitive Star Wars FPS to appear."

IGN were more impressed, scoring the game 8 out of 10. Although they were critical of the graphics and frame rate and found the game to be inferior to Jedi Outcast, reviewer Steve Butts concluded, "For the 15 or so hours that it lasted, I enjoyed Jedi Academy." GameSpot's Craig Beers scored the game 8.1 out of 10. He praised the mapping of the PC version's controls to the Xbox Controller and the implementation of Xbox Live, but like IGN, he was critical of the frame rates. He concluded that "The game may not look great, but it translates well to the Xbox--for those who would prefer to play it on a console. It even caters to those who aren't familiar with the Star Wars universe and just want pure action. In general, Jedi Knight: Jedi Academy is highly recommendable." GameZone's Nick Valentino scored the game 8.2 out of 10 and was especially impressed with the use of Xbox live; "the biggest draw--and the one that has me playing this one very often--is the fact that the multiplayer modes can also be played online using the Xbox Live service. That's right, you read it correctly. You can duel against other Xbox gamers out there using any of the seven multiplayer modes and even talk trash using your Xbox Communicator. Here's your chance to see if you're truly good with the lightsaber."

== See also ==
- List of formerly proprietary software
- List of open source games
