= Katarn =

Katarn may refer to, in relation to the Star Wars video game series Dark Forces/Jedi Knight:

- Kyle Katarn, Jedi and protagonist of the Dark Forces/Jedi Knight series
- Morgan Katarn, a minor Star Wars character, Kyle Katarn's father, also a Jedi
- Patricia Katarn, a minor Star Wars character, Kyle Katarn's mother
- Katarn Commandos, fictional commando group named after a creature native to Kashyyyk of the same name
- Katarn-class armour, worn by the Republic Commandos in Star Wars Republic Commando (series)
