= Jedi (disambiguation) =

Jedi are the fictional adherents of the warrior discipline in Star Wars films.

Jedi or JEDI may also refer to:

== Arts, entertainment, and media ==
- Jedi (game engine), a game engine developed primarily by Ray Gresko for LucasArts
- Return of the Jedi (also known as Star Wars: Episode VI – Return of the Jedi), a 1983 Star Wars film
- Star Wars: Jedi Knight, a video game
- A 2008 song by Melpo Mene
- "Chapter 13: The Jedi", 2020 episode of The Mandalorian

== Science and technology ==
- JEDI, an instrument on the Juno spacecraft
- Joint Enterprise Defense Infrastructure, or JEDI, a U.S. Department of Defense cloud computing procurement contract
- Joint European Disruptive Initiative, or JEDI, a European funding agency aiming at promoting disruptive technologies

== Other uses ==
- jedi, alternative spelling of zedi, term for a Burmese pagoda
- Jedi, adherents of Jediism
  - Jedi census phenomenon, a movement created in 2001 for people to record their religion as "Jedi" or "Jedi Knight" on the national census
- Joint Energy Development Investments, or JEDI, a joint venture in the Enron Scandal
- Antonee Robinson, nicknamed 'Jedi', an American professional soccer player
- Justice, Equity, Diversity, and Inclusion, particularly within education

== See also ==
- Al Giedi, the double star-system Alpha Capricorni
- Djedi, a fictional ancient Egyptian magician
