= Star Wars: Jedi Knight =

Series of video games

- The logo for Jedi Knight games, used in Jedi Outcast and Jedi Academy
- Genres: First-person shooter, third-person shooter
- Developers: LucasArts; Raven Software
- Publishers: LucasArts; Activision
- Platforms: Windows, MS-DOS, Classic Mac OS, PlayStation, Linux, GameCube, Mac OS X, Xbox, Nintendo Switch, PlayStation 4
- First release: Star Wars: Dark Forces; 1995
- Latest release: Star Wars Jedi Knight: Jedi Academy; 2003
- Parent series: Star Wars video games

Star Wars: Jedi Knight (Note: The series was initially referred to as Dark Forces, with the first "Jedi Knight" iteration billed as Dark Forces II) is a series of first- and third-person shooter video games set in the fictional Star Wars expanded universe. The series focuses primarily on Kyle Katarn, a former Imperial officer who becomes a mercenary working for the Rebel Alliance, and later a Jedi and instructor at Luke Skywalker's Jedi Academy. While the first game is set a year after the events of A New Hope, the sequels take place in the decade following Return of the Jedi.

The Jedi Knight series began in 1995 with the release of Star Wars: Dark Forces for MS-DOS, Classic Mac OS, and PlayStation. This was followed in 1997 by Star Wars Jedi Knight: Dark Forces II for Windows, in which Katarn learns the ways of a Jedi. In 1998, Star Wars Jedi Knight: Mysteries of the Sith was released as an expansion pack for Dark Forces II, this time giving the player control of Mara Jade as well as Katarn. In 2002, Star Wars Jedi Knight II: Jedi Outcast was released. Jedi Outcast was developed by Raven Software and powered by the id Tech 3 game engine. It was released for Windows, Mac, Xbox and GameCube. Star Wars Jedi Knight: Jedi Academy followed in 2003 on Windows, Mac and Xbox. It was powered by the same game engine as its predecessor. Jedi Academy was the first game in the series where the player does not control Katarn at any point, although he is featured prominently in the storyline.

The games in the Jedi Knight series have received generally favorable reviews. Multiple publications have commented on the quality of the series as a whole. The use of the lightsaber in the series, a prominent gameplay element in all but the first game, has received specific praise for its implementation.

== Games ==
Release timeline
1995	Star Wars: Dark Forces
1996
1997	Star Wars Jedi Knight: Dark Forces II
1998	Star Wars Jedi Knight: Mysteries of the Sith
1999
2000
2001
2002	Star Wars Jedi Knight II: Jedi Outcast
2003	Star Wars Jedi Knight: Jedi Academy

- Star Wars: Dark Forces was developed and published by LucasArts, and released in North America on February 28, 1995, for MS-DOS and Macintosh, and on November 30, 1996, for PlayStation. It was the first officially produced first-person shooter set in the Star Wars universe.
- Star Wars Jedi Knight: Dark Forces II was again developed and published by LucasArts, and released in North America on October 10, 1997, for Microsoft Windows.
  - Star Wars Jedi Knight: Mysteries of the Sith is an expansion pack for Dark Forces II. Developed and published by LucasArts, it was released on February 24, 1998, for Microsoft Windows. The expansion includes a single-player mode and fifteen multiplayer maps.
- Star Wars Jedi Knight II: Jedi Outcast was developed by Raven Software for PC and Vicarious Visions for the Xbox and GameCube. LucasArts published the Windows version worldwide and the Xbox and GameCube versions in North America, Activision published the Xbox and GameCube versions in Europe, and Aspyr published the Mac version worldwide. The PC version was released in North America on March 26, 2002, the Mac version on November 5, and the Xbox and GameCube versions on November 19.
- Star Wars Jedi Knight: Jedi Academy was developed by Raven Software for PC and Vicarious Visions for the Xbox. LucasArts published the Windows and Xbox versions in North America, Activision published them in Europe, and Aspyr published the Mac version worldwide. Jedi Academy was released on September 16, 2003, for Mac, on September 17 for Windows, and on November 18 for Xbox.

== Overview ==
=== Gameplay ===
The Jedi Knight series is composed primarily of first/third-person shooter gameplay elements, with a number of variation on the norms of the genre within each game. All of the games use a level based system which contains a series of objectives that must be completed before the player can continue. From Dark Forces II onwards, the games have included lightsaber combat and the use of Force powers, which have been tweaked and modified as the series has progressed.

In the first game, Dark Forces, the focus is on combat against various creatures and characters from the Star Wars universe, and includes environmental puzzles and hazards, whilst following a central storyline outlined in mission briefings and cutscenes. For combat, the player may use fists, explosive land mines and thermal detonators, as well as blasters and other ranged weapons, with the gameplay leaning more towards ranged combat.

In Dark Forces II, the player has the option of a third-person view, plus an option to switch automatically to third-person when the lightsaber is the selected weapon. Three types of Force powers are introduced in this game: Light powers provide non violent advantages, Dark powers provide violent ones, while Neutral powers enhance athletic abilities. The game has two endings, depending on whether the player chooses to focus on the Light Side or the Dark Side.

Unlike its predecessor, Mysteries of the Sith has a single, morally positive course, as the player progresses through the game in a linear fashion. The game includes most of the enemies featured in Dark Forces II, plus some new monsters. The player has access to Force powers and projectile weapons such as a blaster or railgun, as well as a lightsaber.

Jedi Outcast's gameplay is similar to that of its predecessors, with some small additions, such as access to gun turrets, or the use of combos unique to each of the three lightsaber styles in the game; fast, medium and strong. As with Dark Forces II and Mysteries of the Sith, the use of Force powers is restricted by a "Force Meter", which depletes when the powers are used.

Jedi Academy features very similar gameplay to Jedi Outcast, although one new feature is that the player may customize their lightsaber at the outset of the game. Later, the player has the option of choosing dual sabers, or a "saber staff", similar to Darth Maul's double ended lightsaber in The Phantom Menace. Instead of moving linearly from one level to the next, the player chooses from a selection of different missions which can be played in any order. The game also introduces player-controllable vehicles and vehicle-based levels.

Starting with Jedi Knight, a multiplayer mode has been included in every game, in which up to eight people can compete with one another via a LAN or up to four people online. In Jedi Knight, the player creates an avatar, and then selects a ranking, with higher rankings having access to more Force powers. There are two types of multiplayer game available; "Capture the flag" and "Jedi Training". Mysteries of the Sith includes fifteen multiplayer maps, four of which only allow players to battle with lightsabers, and a ranking system that tracks the player's experience. The multiplayer mode allows the use of pre-set characters featured in both Jedi Knight and Mysteries of the Sith, as well as characters from the Star Wars films, such as Luke Skywalker, Darth Vader and Boba Fett. In Mysteries, the "Capture the flag" mode is altered, with the gradual reduction of the Force powers of the player who is carrying the flag.

Jedi Outcast features several multiplayer modes, which, in the PC and Mac versions, can be played over a LAN or the internet. Multiplayer mode is limited to two players on the Xbox and GameCube versions of the game. Game modes include "Free-For-All", "Team Deathmatch", "Capture the Flag", "Power Duel" and "Siege", all of which can be played with other players, bots, or both. Jedi Academy introduces several multiplayer modifications, such as Movie Battles II which allows players to take part in lightsaber duels that featured in the Star Wars films. Movie Battles also lets players choose different classes of character, ranging from Jedi Knight to Wookiee. Another popular modification, Evolution of Combat, allows players to use more movie-realistic saber combat along with other additions such as a movie accurate class system featuring tens of new characters.

=== Story ===
The Jedi Knight video games are set in the Star Wars universe. For the majority of the series, the player controls Kyle Katarn, who begins as a mercenary, eventually learning the ways of The Force, becoming a Jedi Master and teaching at the Jedi Academy.

Prior to the events of Dark Forces, Katarn was a student studying to follow in his father's career of agricultural mechanics. However, while at an academy, he was told by officials that the Rebel Alliance had killed his parents. His anger led him to enlist in the Imperial army, where he soon met Jan Ors, an undercover double agent working for the Alliance. Ors uncovered the real information about Katarn's parents; they had actually been killed by the Empire. Shortly thereafter, Ors' cover was blown, and she was taken prisoner. Katarn helped her escape, thus ending his career with the Empire. He then became a mercenary, and due to his hatred for the Empire, regularly took on jobs for the Alliance.

In the first level of Dark Forces, which is set prior to A New Hope, Katarn recovers the plans to the Death Star, a heavily armed space station capable of destroying entire planets. The Rebel Alliance uses the plans to find a weakness in and then destroy the Death Star. Katarn then aids the Rebels in stopping the threat of the Imperial "Dark Trooper" project. Despite the successful missions on behalf of the Alliance, however, Katarn does not join their cause. Dark Forces II begins several years after the destruction of the second Death Star in Return of the Jedi, when Katarn is informed of the exact details of his father's death. His father, Morgan Katarn, had discovered the location of "The Valley of the Jedi", a source of great Force power, but a Dark Jedi named Jerec murdered Morgan in an attempt to find the location. Katarn travels to the Valley of the Jedi while learning the ways of the Jedi himself. Eventually, he confronts and defeats Jerec, avenging his father's death. However, Katarn still does not join the Jedi Order, instead using his powers for the New Republic, and taking on an apprentice with a similar history to himself; Mara Jade. During this time, Katarn learns of a Sith temple on the planet Dromund Kaas. There, Katarn is corrupted by the Dark Side of the Force. However, Jade is able to convince him to return to the Light and they leave together.

This incident causes Katarn to distance himself from the Force and return to mercenary missions with Jan Ors. In Jedi Outcast, Ors is captured by Desann, a former pupil of Luke Skywalker who has turned to the Dark Side. Katarn believes Desann to have killed Ors, and so he returns to the Valley of the Jedi in an attempt to reconnect to the Force so as to stop Desann. Eventually, it is revealed that Ors' death is a ruse by Desann for the express purpose of having Katarn return to the Valley, so Desann may learn of its location. Desann, in league with the Imperial Remnant, uses the power of the Valley to endow his troops with Force power, before using them to launch an attack on the Jedi Academy. However, Katarn defeats Desann and discovers his true path, becoming a tutor at the academy. In Jedi Academy, Katarn takes on two students: Jaden Korr and Rosh Penin. The protagonist of the game is Jaden, who is dispatched on various peace-keeping missions across the galaxy, sometimes with Katarn, sometimes alone. Jaden eventually encounters a Sith cult led by Tavion (Desann's former apprentice) who plans to restore the Sith to power by using stolen Force energy to resurrect an ancient Sith Lord, Marka Ragnos. After learning that Rosh has betrayed the Jedi and joined Tavion, Jaden may either kill him and turn to the Dark Side or let him live and remain on the Light Side. If Jaden chooses the Dark Side, they kill Tavion, defeat Katarn, and flee with Tavion's staff, which is capable of absorbing the Force. The game ends with Katarn setting out in pursuit of Jaden. If Jaden chooses to spare Rosh, they ultimately defeat both Tavion and the spirit of Ragnos, and are lauded for their actions by Katarn and Luke.

== Development ==
Production of Star Wars: Dark Forces began in September 1993, with Daron Stinnett as project leader and Justin Chin as lead writer. The developers wanted to adapt the first-person shooter format to include strategy and puzzles, which at the time, had never been done. Dark Forces thus features numerous logic puzzles and parts of the game requires a strategic method to progress, often involving manipulation of the environment. This style of gameplay has remained constant in all Jedi Knight games. Another aspect that has remained the same since Dark Forces is the use of John Williams' soundtrack from the Star Wars films. In Dark Forces the music was implemented using iMuse, software that alters the music depending on what is happening at any given moment in the game. Lucasarts developed the Jedi game engine to power Dark Forces, adding features to the first-person shooter genre that were uncommon at the time, such as multi-level floors and free look, as well as athletic abilities such as running, jumping, ducking and swimming. Original plans for the game had Luke Skywalker as the main character, but due to the limitations this would impose on the story, the developers designed a new character, Kyle Katarn.

Even before the release of Dark Forces, Justin Chin had planned out Katarn's role in Dark Forces II, indicating that Katarn would face a "big trial" in a game that would be a "rite of passage." Chin became project leader for Dark Forces II. In the game, the digital audio from Dark Forces was replaced with CD audio. Dark Forces II adds two "Jedi" aspects to the series; the use of The Force and the lightsaber. The Force plays an integral role in how the player plays the game. The method of allocating credits to Force powers was designed with an RPG style in mind, allowing the player the choice of which powers to improve. Chin said in an early interview that progress through the game is based upon the abilities the player develops. A new game engine, the Sith engine, was developed for Dark Forces II, which uses both 3D graphics and sound. It was one of the first games to adopt the use of 3D graphics hardware acceleration using Microsoft Direct3D. Another development was that Dark Forces II moved on from the static images between levels used in Dark Forces to full motion video cutscenes. The characters are represented by live actors while the backgrounds are pre-rendered. The cutscenes included the first lightsaber footage filmed since Return of the Jedi in 1983. Dark Forces II also introduced multiplayer gaming to the series, allowing players to play online or via a LAN.

Nearly four years after the release of Dark Forces II, LucasArts announced at E3 2001 that Jedi Knight II: Jedi Outcast would be released in 2002. Unlike previous games in the series, Jedi Outcast was not developed in-house by LucasArts, but by Raven Software. The subsequent success of Outcast led LucasArts to continue the partnership with Raven, leading to the development of Jedi Knight: Jedi Academy a year later; "With the overwhelming success and critical acclaim of Star Wars: Jedi Outcast, continuing an alliance with Activision and Raven Software was a clear and very easy decision," said then-president of LucasArts, Simon Jeffery. Jedi Outcast and Jedi Academy are both powered by the Quake III: Team Arena game engine, with modifications for the use of a lightsaber and The Force. Jedi Academy is the only game in the Jedi Knight series that does not give the player control of Katarn at any point. Instead the focus is on Jaden Korr, a student of the Force under Katarn. The decision to change protagonist was made by the developers for gameplay reasons.

Many years later, games from the series were remastered for later high-definition generations of video games, starting with remasters of Jedi Outcast and Jedi Academy for Nintendo Switch and PlayStation 4 in 2019 and 2020 respectively by Aspyr. In 2024, the first game in the series, Dark Forces, was remastered on all major eighth and ninth-generation consoles released after the Wii U by Nightdive Studios, currently leaving the PC-exclusive Jedi Knight: Dark Forces II to be the last, only game in the series to not be available on any consoles or remastered for later platforms.

== Reception ==
Aggregate review scores As of August 22, 2013.
Game	GameRankings	Metacritic
Star Wars: Dark Forces (PC)	77%	
Star Wars: Dark Forces (PS)	60%	
Star Wars Jedi Knight: Dark Forces II (PC)	89%	91/100
Star Wars Jedi Knight: Mysteries of the Sith (PC)	76%	
Star Wars Jedi Knight II: Jedi Outcast (PC)	87%	89/100
Star Wars Jedi Knight II: Jedi Outcast (Xbox)	79%	81/100
Star Wars Jedi Knight II: Jedi Outcast (GameCube)	75%	75/100
Star Wars Jedi Knight: Jedi Academy (PC)	80%	81/100
Star Wars Jedi Knight: Jedi Academy (Xbox)	75%	76/100

The Jedi Knight series as a whole has been well received. The series itself has been described as "highly acclaimed," and has been noted by IGN as one of few Star Wars themed video game franchises that is of consistently high quality on the PC. GamersMark.com called the series "rather entertaining," whilst GameNOW rated it as "consistently great."

Individually, each game in the series has been generally well received. In 1995, Dark Forces became LucasArts' highest sell-in with more than 300,000 copies accounted for at launch. Games in the series have achieved consistently favorable review scores from most publications, and hold high aggregate scores on both Metacritic and GameRankings. The only exceptions are the PlayStation version of Dark Forces, which was perceived to have graphical problems and the GameCube version of Jedi Outcast, which was seen as considerably inferior to the PC and Xbox versions.

Games in the Jedi Knight series have also received specific commendation and awards. Dark Forces II was judged the best game of the year for 1997 by five publications, and was number one in PC Gamer's "50 best games ever" list in 1998. Jedi Outcast was a finalist in the Academy of Interactive Arts & Sciences "Interactive Achievement Awards" in the 2002 Computer Action/Adventure Game of the Year category. The game also received commendations from PC Gamer and Computer Gaming World.

Gameplay aspects of the series have also been well received. The lightsaber charted at number 7 in UGO Networks's countdown of the 50 best weapons in video games. The publication commented that using such a weapon in a game was "extremely satisfying," and stated that lightsaber usage had been refined as the series continued.

Multiple publications have described Kyle Katarn as one of the best-known Star Wars video game characters, the nexus around which the series developed from a conventional first-person shooter into a sequence centred on Jedi powers and lightsaber combat, and a connective figure who had expanded beyond the games into fiction and merchandise. Katarn's place within the franchise changed after Lucasfilm designated the pre-2014 Expanded Universe as Star Wars Legends and has not been incorporated into the later unified continuity, although retrospective coverage has repeatedly proposed his return or adaptation. Lucasfilm's official website later included Katarn among its notable video-game characters, describing his progression across four games as an example of the franchise's interactive storytelling. The 2024 remaster of Dark Forces reintroduced his first appearance on contemporary systems, with Lucasfilm framing the release as an opportunity for modern players to encounter the character. In 2025, Hasbro announced a Kyle Katarn figure for its Star Wars: The Black Series line, based on his appearance in Jedi Outcast.
