= Jason Court =

American actor

- Born: September 6, 1963 (age 62)
- Occupations: Actor, winemaker

Jason Court (born September 6, 1963) is an American actor, voice actor, and winemaker. He became a winemaker after retiring as an actor in the early 2000s. Court is most famous for playing Kyle Katarn in the cutscenes of Star Wars Jedi Knight: Dark Forces II. The likeness of the character from that point forward were based on Jason and his performance.

== Filmography ==
=== Film ===
Year	Title	Role	Notes
1984	Up the Creek	Powers	
1984	Grandview, U.S.A.	Benny	
1988	A Night in the Life of Jimmy Reardon	Mathew Hollander	

=== Television ===
Year	Title	Role	Notes
1994	Red Shoe Diaries	Cowboy	Episode: "You Make Me Want to Wear Dresses"
1995	Diagnosis: Murder	Eddie	Episode: "Sea No Evil"
1995	Silk Stalkings	Matthew	Episode: "Tricks of the Trade"

=== Video games ===
Year	Title	Role	Notes
1997	Star Wars Jedi Knight: Dark Forces II	Kyle Katarn	
1999	Septerra Core: Legacy of the Creator	Kaleb	
