= Movie Battles =

2003 multiplayer video game

- Developer: Movie Battles Team
- Series: Star Wars: Jedi Knight
- Engine: id Tech 3
- Platforms: Mac OS, Microsoft Windows, Linux
- Release: Initial: 2003; 23 years ago Latest Version: R21.8.01 (Jan 2026)
- Genres: First-person shooter; third-person shooter; hack and slash
- Mode: Multiplayer

Movie Battles II (MBII) is a team-based multiplayer mod for the 2003 third and first-person shooter game Star Wars Jedi Knight: Jedi Academy. It is a successor of the Movie Battles mod for Star Wars Jedi Knight II: Jedi Outcast. The primary purpose of the mod is to allow players to experience setpiece battle scenes from the Star Wars films and the Star Wars expanded universe. The gameplay is similar to that of the base game, but builds upon it with several new elements. The mod has been lauded for providing one of the best lightsaber combat experiences out of any Star Wars game.

In Movie Battles II, two teams of up to 16 players compete either to complete certain objectives, or to eliminate all members of the enemy team. Several different game modes are available, most of which feature customisable character classes.

== Gameplay ==
Screenshot of version 1.4.1 taken in June 2016

Movie Battles II is a team-based game that allows players to join either the Lights Side of the Force (represented by the Galactic Republic, the Rebel Alliance, or the Resistance, depending on the map) or the Dark Side (represented by the Separatists/CIS, the Galactic Empire, or the First Order). The game incorporates both lightsaber combat and shooter elements, and can be played from either a third- or first-person perspective. The lightsaber combat in Movie Battles has been substantially changed from the original game. There are meters for both force pool and block stamina which deplete as the player intercepts incoming blaster and lightsaber attacks.

Similarly to games like Counter-Strike, Movie Battles uses an objective system, where one team defends and the other one attacks one or more objectives. Objective types are usually variants on common themes, such as "slicing panels", or NPC guarding. Every round, the attacking team must complete their given objective within a given amount of time, while the defending team tries to delay them until the timer runs out; alternatively, each team can win by eliminating all members of the enemy team. Any player who is killed before the end of the round becomes a spectator. They may follow certain players who are still alive or free-roam in the spectator cam, similar to other first-person shooters, such as Battlefield 2.

Besides communicating with other players, the chat is used for voting. Players may vote to change the map or the game mode. The game also incorporates a voice chat, which is used to give quick commands to the rest of the team, such as "Attack", "Defend Position", and "Charge".

=== Classes ===
Most game modes in Movie Battles II let players choose between multiple character classes to play as. Players may select iconic Star Wars characters as "skins" for these classes, and are given a limited number of points to upgrade stats and abilities; every class has a different playstyle and a few unique abilities. If playing as Jedi or Sith, players can also customise their lightsaber hilt.

- Soldiers - the most basic class, it is available for both the Light Side and the Dark Side. Soldiers are equipped only with a blaster, a pistol and possibly grenades, but can have up to three lives, allowing them to respawn multiple times during the same round.
- Elite Troopers / Commanders - a superior version of Soldiers, the Elite Troopers and their Dark Side equivalent, the Commanders, have overall better weapons and stats, but can have only two lives. They can also have a unique ability called "Rally", which allows soldiers to respawn next to them.
- Jedi / Sith - Jedi and their Dark Side equivalent, Sith, can use lightsabers and the Force in combat. Both can use their lightsaber to deflect blaster fire or lightsaber strikes, and have Force abilities such as Push (used to push enemies), Pull (used to disarm or pull enemies), Jump (used to jump higher than regular classes and stick to walls), and Sense (used to see allies and enemies through walls and on the map HUD). Jedi can also use Force Speed and Mind Trick, while Sith can use Force Choke and Lightning. All these Force powers, as well as blocking attacks with the lightsaber, cost Force Points to use, which regenerate over time.
- Heroes / Bounty Hunters - Heroes and their Dark Side equivalent, Bounty Hunters, are a marksman class. They have the best overall weapons in the game, including a sniper rifle, and can have one or more special abilities. Heroes can quickly dodge incoming blaster fire or lightsaber strikes and heal damage over time, while Bounty Hunters have tracking and poison darts.
- Wookiees - A class exclusive to the Light Side, Wookiees can deal high amounts of damage with their melee attacks, killing most enemies with only a few punches. They also have very high HP and a special ability called "Rage", which reduces the amount of damage they receive and the damage they deal for a short time period. Wookiees can also be equipped with weapons like bowcasters and frag grenades.
- Clone Troopers - A class exclusive to the Light Side, clone troopers are armed with repeater blaster rifles and a pistol. The rifle can be upgraded into a minigun or to fire ion and electricity blasts, while the pistol can be upgraded to fire bolts that ricochet off walls. Clones can also have one additional life.
- Advanced Recon Commandos (ARC Troopers) - A class exclusive to the Light Side, ARC Troopers are a superior version of Clone Troopers. They can have a unique ability called "Dexterity", which allows them to dodge attacks, jump higher, and briefly run on walls, as well as roll instead of being knocked down. The ARC Troopers can be equipped with one or two pistols, a rocket launcher, and a blaster rifle, which can alternatively be converted into a sniper rifle or a grenade launcher.
- Mandalorians - A class exclusive to the Dark Side, Mandalorians have jetpacks allowing them to fly until they run out of fuel, and are armed with one or two Westar Pistols and a blaster rifle (which can be converted into a sniper rifle). They can also have a flamethrower, a wrist laser, and a one-use jetpack rocket.
- Droidekas - A class exclusive to the Dark Side, Droidekas are equipped with shields and arm-mounted blasters, which have unlimited ammunition, but need to be recharged. While slow in their regular form, they can change into their rolling form to move faster, although this makes them more vulnerable. Droidekas can also discharge their shield, unleashing a shockwave that knocks down all nearby enemies.
- Super Battle Droids (SBDs) - A class exclusive to the Dark Side, SBDs are large and slow, but have very high HP and a strong melee attack, with which they can instantly knock down most enemies. Similarly to the Droidekas, they are equipped with arm-mounted blasters. However, SBDs rely very much on their internal battery, which affects both their firepower and damage reduction, making them virtually useless when the battery is depleted. To recharge the battery faster, they can activate the low power mode, but this makes them even slower and unable to fire their weapons. SBDs can also have several unique abilities, such as advanced logic (making them immune to Jedi mind tricks), advanced targeting (giving them a zoom-in option for their blasters), and advanced radar (allowing them to see enemies on the map HUD when in low power mode).

=== Game modes ===
- Open - the basic game mode of Movie Battles II. Two teams of players (the attackers and the defenders) are pitted against each other, with the attackers attempting to complete a given objective, unique for each map, while the defenders try to stop them until a timer runs out. Alternatively, either team can win by eliminating all members of the opposing force. In this mode, all aforementioned classes are available to play as, and fully customisable.
- Duel - this mode's primary purpose is to allow players to recreate iconic duels from the Star Wars saga. Only the Jedi and Sith classes are playable, and players are given three lives. Once a player loses all their lives, they will be able to respawn shortly thereafter with three lives again, thus preventing either side from winning by eliminating the enemy team. Since this mode features no objectives, it is virtually impossible for either side to achieve victory, resulting in rounds lasting for an extended period of time, until the timer runs out.
- Full Authentic - a variation of the Open mode, featuring no customisable classes, only specific characters with pre-defined traits. Characters are usually accurate to the map, as the mode's purpose is to allow players to recreate scenarios from the Star Wars saga as they were originally depicted (hence the mode's name). Some characters have unique abilities that can't be found in the Open mode, thus giving them some diversity.
- Semi-Authentic - a combination of the Open and Full Authentic modes. While all classes from the Open mode are available to play as and fully customisable, only map-accurate skins can be selected. As a result, the mode plays similarly to the Full Authentic mode, with the exception that players are able to customize their character's abilities.
- Legends - a variation of the Full Authentic mode, also featuring characters with pre-defined traits who cannot be customised in any way. The difference is that the characters are not map-accurate, each map featuring the same playable characters, from across all eras of the Star Wars saga.

== Development ==
Movie Battles was started by Richard Hart (online alias RenegadeOfPhunk) in 2003, with the goal of mixing the round- and objective-based gameplay of Counter-Strike with the lightsaber and gun mechanics of Star Wars. The first versions of the mod were developed for Star Wars Jedi Knight II: Jedi Outcast, the third game in the Jedi Knight series. This version already had the key elements of Movie Battles in it, such as the modified lightsaber combat and the last man standing system. The mod was later remade for Star Wars Jedi Knight: Jedi Academy. A spin-off of Movie Battles II, titled The New Era (TNE), was developed using Source engine, which would have allowed for improved graphics and a better physics engine, but was cancelled in 2013. While meant to be a successor to Movie Battles II, the mod would have been closer to the deathmatch genre. Many members of the development team for TNE were also part of the Movie Battles team. On 2 April 2011, a trailer revealing a sequel was released. Movie Battles 3 was going to be a standalone, free game developed on the Unreal Engine, but due to a general disinterest among developers and the game's community, coupled with the lack of developers willing to stay on board the project to begin with, it was cancelled after a few years in development. Since then, developers have focused on expanding and improving Movie Battles II, with several updates being released every year. The latest update, R20.0.06, was released on October 9, 2024.

In 2018, a spiritual sequel to the modification called Movie Duels was made with the purpose for a remastered single-player mode with a campaign based on the franchise movies, using an unofficial patch for the Jedi Academy engine called OpenJK to remake the melee combat and physics.

== Reception ==
In 2005 the UK edition of PC Gamer printed an article covering the mod. In the same year Sky News mentioned Movie Battles alongside other user-made game modifications. It was also mentioned by Rock, Paper, Shotgun's Alec Meer in the sites 2015 list of best Star Wars video games. Of the mod, Meer said the mod was something players should "probably [...] check out." Matthew Znadowicz of Eurogamer Poland called the game's action "unique and fresh", yet noted that battles often became "stressful, intense, but extremely pleasant." As of June 2016, 400 users on the website Mod DB have rated the game with the average score of 9.4.
