= Star Wars Jedi Knight: Mysteries of the Sith =

1998 video game

- European Windows cover art
- Developer: LucasArts
- Publisher: LucasArts
- Designer: Stephen Shaw
- Composer: Peter McConnell
- Series: Star Wars: Jedi Knight
- Platform: Microsoft Windows
- Release: NA: February 17, 1998; EU: March 12, 1998
- Genres: First-person shooter, third-person shooter
- Modes: Single-player, multiplayer

Star Wars Jedi Knight: Mysteries of the Sith is an expansion pack for the 1997 first-person shooter Star Wars Jedi Knight: Dark Forces II, developed and published by LucasArts for Microsoft Windows in 1998. It was re-released on Steam in September 2009. The expansion includes a new single-player story mode and fifteen multiplayer maps. The single-player story, set in the Star Wars expanded universe five years after the events of Dark Forces II, follows both returning protagonist Kyle Katarn, a Jedi Master and mercenary working for the New Republic, and Mara Jade, a character featured in numerous Star Wars expanded universe works, who is being trained by Katarn in the Jedi arts. After Katarn goes missing while investigating an ancient Sith temple, Jade continues her studies on her own while undertaking missions from the New Republic, eventually leaving to find Katarn.

Mysteries of the Sith uses the same game engine as Dark Forces II, the Sith engine, but features several technical improvements, including colored lighting, new textures and models, and better AI. The expansion puts more emphasis on lightsaber combat and Force powers, introduced in Dark Forces II. The multiplayer mode allows up to eight players to play online or over a local area network.

Upon release, the expansion received generally positive reviews. Critics praised its story and AI improvements, but felt there was room for additional improvements and criticized its inconsistent difficulty and certain gameplay elements. It was followed by Star Wars Jedi Knight II: Jedi Outcast in 2002, the next main installment in the Jedi Knight series. A reverse engineered source port called OpenJKDF2 supports Mysteries of the Sith.

== Gameplay ==
=== Single-player ===
Mysteries of the Sith is primarily a first-person shooter, but offers the choice of a third-person view. Unlike Dark Forces II, where the player's actions within the game dictate whether the story ends with the light side or the dark side ending, Mysteries of the Sith has a single, morally positive course. The player progresses through the game in a linear fashion; there are fourteen levels and each has set objectives that the player must complete before being able to continue to the next level. Within each level the player can encounter both hostile and non-hostile non-player characters (NPCs). As well as including some enemies that featured in Dark Forces II, Mysteries of the Sith adds twenty new monsters, including a rancor. Some non-hostile NPCs may help the player by attacking enemies.

The player has a choice of weapons to use throughout the game. These include projectile weapons such as a blaster or thermal detonator, and the lightsaber. The player also has access to Force powers. Some are capable of causing damage to enemies while others can be used for non-violent activities.

=== Multiplayer ===
Mysteries of the Sith includes fifteen multiplayer maps, four of which only allow players to battle with lightsabers. The player can choose an avatar and the lightsaber color, and compete with up to seven other players over the internet or a local area network. The game includes a ranking system that tracks the player's experience. Multiplayer mode allows the use of pre-set characters featured in both Mysteries of the Sith and Dark Forces II. There is also a choice of characters from the Star Wars films, such as Luke Skywalker, Darth Vader and Boba Fett, who was already a playable character in the Dark Forces II series. Each type of character has advantages and disadvantages.

Several locations from the Star Wars films have been recreated as maps for multiplayer gaming. These include Luke's home on Tatooine from A New Hope, the carbon-freezing chamber on Bespin from The Empire Strikes Back and the Emperor's throne room on the Death Star from Return of the Jedi. The capture the flag multiplayer mode has been altered since Dark Forces II. The player must now steal a ysalamir from the other team and return it to his or her own base. The ysalamir has the added effect of reducing the Force powers of the player who is carrying it.

== Plot ==
Mysteries of the Sith is set in the year 10 ABY, six years after the events of Return of the Jedi and five years after Dark Forces II (and during the events of the 1991 comic book series Dark Empire). The story continues from the "Light Side" ending of Dark Forces II, with Kyle Katarn having become a powerful Jedi Master and taking Mara Jade as his apprentice. Like Katarn, Jade is a former member of the Galactic Empire, but joined the New Republic to become a Jedi Knight.

The first level of the game takes place in a new New Republic outpost on the planet Altyr V, where Katarn and Jade's training session is interrupted by an Imperial attack on the base. The player takes control of Katarn to defend the base from stormtroopers and get to the command center. Once there, it is revealed that an evacuation cannot take place because of bombardment by two weapons platforms disguised as asteroids. Katarn leaves Jade behind as he travels to the asteroids to destroy them.

After this section, the player controls Jade for the rest of the game. Katarn reveals that he has information on the whereabouts of a Sith temple on Dromund Kaas, which he goes to investigate, leaving Jade to continue her studies of the Force alone while undertaking new assignments from the Republic. After completing her missions, Jade learns that contact with Katarn has been lost and goes to Dromund Kaas to find what has happened to him. At the temple, she discovers that Katarn has been corrupted by the power of the dark side, and fails to convince him to return to the light, so the two end up dueling each other. This helps Katarn escape the dark side's influence, as he cannot bring himself to kill Jade after she disengages her lightsaber. However, the incident causes Katarn to distance himself from the Force and return to his mercenary ways.

== Development ==
The cutscenes in Mysteries of the Sith are rendered by the 3D engine, a change from the full motion video used in Dark Forces II.

Star Wars Jedi Knight: Mysteries of the Sith was developed and published by LucasArts as an expansion to Star Wars Jedi Knight: Dark Forces II. Mysteries of the Sith's development team was led by Stephen Shaw, the lead programmer for LucasArts titles Full Throttle and Outlaws. Development commenced immediately after Outlaws's completion in 1997, which ensured the game's quick release following that of Dark Forces II.

Being an expansion to Dark Forces II, Mysteries of the Sith requires the Dark Forces II CD-ROM the first time the player starts the game. LucasArts made improvements to the 3D engine used in Dark Forces II by including colored lighting. The live-action full-motion video cutscenes that were used between levels in Dark Forces II have been replaced with full-motion video scenes that were rendered by the 3D engine.

The artificial intelligence has been developed further to produce more realistic actions from the NPCs. The hostile and non-hostile NPCs can fight amongst each other with little or no input from the player. Another improvement is that if a player were to use "Force pull" to take weapons away from enemies in Dark Forces II, the enemies would walk around doing nothing; by contrast, in Mysteries of the Sith the enemies attempt to defeat the player by punching them.

According to Stephen Shaw, most of Mysteries of the Sith's content was inspired by Timothy Zahn's Thrawn trilogy of books; one of the game's protagonists, Mara Jade, was drawn directly from the novels. Though the expansion includes characters from the previous game, new dialogue was recorded for Mysteries of the Sith's scenario, including recurring background characters who speak similar lines to their counterparts in Dark Forces II. Some dialogue was authentically translated into Huttese, a fictional language used in Return of the Jedi and elsewhere in the Star Wars universe. The original Star Wars soundtrack by John Williams is used in Mysteries of the Sith.

== Reception ==
Reception

Aggregate score
Aggregator	Score
GameRankings	75.60%

Review scores
Publication	Score
AllGame	4.5/5
Computer and Video Games	5/10
GameSpot	7.8/10
Next Generation	4/5
PC Zone	95%

In the United States, Mysteries of the Sith debuted at #10 on PC Data's monthly computer game sales chart for February 1998. It fell to position 15 the following month, with an average retail price of $28, and was absent from April's top 20. The game was well received by critics. It holds an aggregate score of 75.60% on GameRankings, based on five reviews. Mysteries of the Sith has been described as a good quality expansion pack and a "worthy addition" to the world of Jedi Knight, but with room for improvement in some areas.

Next Generation reviewed the PC version of the game, rating it four stars out of five, and stated that "on the whole, MOTS gives notice to expansion pack designers everywhere: It is possible to create an exceptional gaming experience within the creative possibilities of an add-on. The foundation has already been laid."

The gameplay of the single-player mode received mixed reactions. Paul Mallinson of PC Zone stated that "Mysteries Of The Sith starts off brilliantly and gets better and better and better the further you get into it. The progressive nature of the constantly evolving storyline sees to that." In contrast, Michael E. Ryan of GameSpot stated that the game is uneven and the challenging levels are only at the end. This adversely affects the gameplay by creating a steep change in how the game must be played. General aspects of the gameplay were seen as improvements, such as the artificial intelligence.

The multiplayer side of Mysteries of the Sith was received positively, but did not completely escape criticism. Emil Pagliarulo of The Adrenaline Vault questioned why certain features seemed to be missing from the multiplayer mode that were present in the single-player mode. One such feature is the rancor which appears prominently in a single-player level but is not in any multiplayer maps.

The development of the graphics in Mysteries of the Sith was seen as an improvement with particular praise for the new colored lighting effects. However, not all new graphical developments were well received and some reviews highlighted that smoke effects from the carbonite weapon are particularly poor. Ryan criticized the whole graphical implementation of the weapon: "The Carbonite gun was a long awaited weapon, but the effects and the resulting graphic for frozen foes are really quite bad."

Mysteries of the Sith received praise for its use of sound. Heidi Shannon was described as an "excellent choice" for the voice of Mara Jade. The musical soundtrack by John Williams received specific commendation for its quality. Pagliarulo stated that its use is executed very well within the game: "Mysteries of the Sith manages to use the right piece [of music] at just the right moment."

Mysteries of the Sith was a finalist for Computer Games Strategy Plus's 1998 "Add-On of the Year" award, which ultimately went to Age of Empires: The Rise of Rome. The editors wrote that Mysteries of the Sith "was somewhat uneven, but what was good was very, very good".
