= Star Wars Jedi Knight II: Jedi Outcast =

2002 video game

- North American Windows cover art
- Developer: Raven Software (Note: Mac OS X version developed by Westlake Interactive. GameCube and Xbox versions developed by Vicarious Visions. 2019 re-release developed by Aspyr.)
- Publishers: NA: LucasArts; WW: Activision (Note: Aspyr published the Mac, Nintendo Switch, and PlayStation 4 versions. THQ Nordic published the retail Nintendo Switch and PlayStation 4 versions.)
- Directors: Steve Raffel; Kevin Schilder
- Producer: Brian Raffel
- Designer: Chris Foster
- Programmer: James Monroe
- Artist: Les Dorscheid
- Writer: Michael Stemmle
- Series: Star Wars: Jedi Knight
- Engine: id Tech 3
- Platforms: Windows; Mac OS; Mac OS X; GameCube; Xbox; Nintendo Switch; PlayStation 4
- Release: March 28, 2002: Windows; NA: March 28, 2002; EU: March 28, 2002 Mac OS, Mac OS X; NA: October 28, 2002 GameCube, Xbox; NA: November 19, 2002; EU: November 22, 2002 Nintendo Switch, PS4; WW: September 24, 2019
- Genres: First-person shooter; third-person shooter; hack and slash
- Modes: Single-player, multiplayer

Star Wars Jedi Knight II: Jedi Outcast is a 2002 first and third-person shooter video game developed by Raven Software for Windows and Mac OS. Westlake Interactive ported the game to Mac OS X, while the Xbox and GameCube versions were ported by Vicarious Visions; most versions were published by Activision and LucasArts, with only the Mac OS version published by Aspyr. The game is a sequel to 1997's Star Wars Jedi Knight: Dark Forces II, and the third main installment in the Star Wars: Jedi Knight series. The single-player campaign, set in the fictional Star Wars expanded universe two years after the Mysteries of the Sith expansion for Dark Forces II, follows returning protagonist Kyle Katarn, a mercenary working for the New Republic and former Jedi who cut his connection to the Force. Katarn must return to his Jedi ways to stop a branch of the Imperial Remnant led by the Dark Jedi Desann from empowering their army with the Force.

Jedi Outcast was developed using a more powerful game engine, id Tech 3. The hack and slash combat introduced in Dark Forces II was heavily reworked, becoming the main focus of the gameplay instead of the shooter elements, which are prominent only during the first few missions of the game. Players may wield blasters, lightsabers, and Force powers to engage enemies, with the latter being recommended in later stages of the game, as numerous lightsaber-wielding enemies are introduced. Jedi Outcast also features a multiplayer mode that allows players to compete in several different game modes online or over a local area network.

Upon release, the game received universal acclaim from critics, with its story and lightsaber combat being the main praised elements. A sequel and the final installment in the Jedi Knight series, Star Wars Jedi Knight: Jedi Academy, was released in 2003. In September 2009, the game was re-released onto Steam and Direct2Drive alongside the rest of the Jedi Knight series. A Nintendo Switch and PlayStation 4 port with no multiplayer mode was released in September 2019. In 2021, Jedi Outcast was made backwards compatible on Xbox One and Xbox Series X/S.

== Gameplay ==
Kyle Katarn fighting a saber-wielding Reborn

Jedi Outcast allows the player to wield a variety of firearms from the Star Wars franchise, as well as lightsabers and Force powers. The player can choose whether to use first or third-person perspective for each weapon, including the lightsaber. Combat is standard for the shooter genre, offering players an array of energy and projectile weapons, plus a variety of explosives. Players have health and shield meters, each of which is replenished separately.

Jedi Outcast places a strong emphasis on lightsaber combat. As in the films, lightsabers can be used to deflect shots from blasters. The game offers three lightsaber styles; fast, medium and strong, with each style differing from the others in terms of the speed of attacks and damage dealt. There are also a number of combos, many of which are unique to the selected saber style.

Force powers (such as Push, Jump, and Lightning) are available in both single-player and multiplayer modes, but more powers can be used in the latter. The use of powers is restricted by a "Force Meter", which depletes with each use and gradually refills over time. The "level" of a Force power determines the strength of that power and the amount depleted from the Force meter during its use. The multiplayer mode divides players into Light Siders and Dark Siders, pitting each side against the other in team battles. Each side has access to both shared "Neutral" Force powers, which are mostly focused on increasing speed and athletic ability. There are also numerous powers unique to both Light and Dark sides. As in the previous games, Light Side powers are mainly focused around protection and healing, while Dark Side powers are openly aggressive. Unlike previous games, however, Kyle does not exclusively select Light or Dark powers in the single-player, instead receiving a selection of both.

=== Single-player ===
The single-player campaign follows Kyle Katarn as he moves through the levels in a linear manner, meeting friendly and hostile non-player characters (NPCs). Friendly NPCs will occasionally assist the player in combat. In addition to combat, the campaign features a variety of puzzles.

When the game starts, Kyle has forsaken The Force after the events of the previous game, and as such, the player has no access to a lightsaber or any Force powers. However, after the first two missions, Kyle regains his Force abilities. As the game progresses the number of powers available, and their strength, increase. Progression of Force abilities is fixed, and cannot be customized. Having previously fallen to the Dark Side, Kyle has access to both Light Side powers (such as Force Heal and Jedi Mind Trick) and Dark Side powers (such as Force Lightning and Force Grip), along with neutral ones (such as Force Speed, Force Jump, Force Pull and Force Push).

=== Multiplayer ===
Star Wars Jedi Knight II: Jedi Outcast offers a variety of multiplayer modes that differ slightly across platforms. On PC and Macintosh, multiplayer matches can be played over a local area network (LAN) or the Internet, allowing for larger, more dynamic battles. Console versions, however, limit multiplayer combat to two players.

In multiplayer, players can join community-hosted dedicated servers found via the in-game server list. These servers allow hosts to customize gameplay by adding mods, maps, and character models. Standard multiplayer modes, including "Free-for-All," "Team Deathmatch," and "Capture the Flag," can be played with other players, AI-controlled bots, or a combination of both. Server hosts can also create unique, custom game modes tailored to their preferred gameplay experiences.

Players can choose a playable avatar from nearly every character in the game, as well as certain characters from the Star Wars films not seen in the single-player mode. Players can also personalize their lightsaber color. Servers can also support custom-imported avatar models, lightsaber colors, and animations.

Before each match, the server specifies game rules, including the "Force ranking" system, which allocates points that players can assign to different Force powers, allowing them to build a character suited to their playstyle. Servers can also restrict matches to lightsabers only, removing traditional weapons for a more immersive Jedi combat experience.

== Synopsis ==
=== Setting and characters ===
The single-player story is set in 12 ABY, eight years after the events of Return of the Jedi and around two years after Mysteries of the Sith. As with the previous installments in the series, the player controls Kyle Katarn (voiced by Jeff Bennett), a former Jedi who has cut his links with the Force after almost succumbing to the Dark Side. At the start of the game he is a mercenary working for the New Republic.

Over the course of the game, Kyle is joined by several characters that assist him in varying measures, including his mercenary partner and love interest Jan Ors (Vanessa Marshall); the sophisticated administrator of Cloud City, Lando Calrissian (Billy Dee Williams); and Jedi Grandmaster and leader of the Jedi Academy on Yavin IV, Luke Skywalker (Bob Bergen). The player also receives help from other Jedi and New Republic soldiers, while Mon Mothma (Carolyn Seymour), Chief-of-State of the New Republic, assigns Kyle and Jan missions during the early stages of the game.

The story features four major antagonists and bosses: Desann (Mark Klastorin), a former student of the Jedi Academy, who turned to the Dark Side after killing a fellow student and leaving the Order; Tavion (Kath Soucie), Desann's apprentice; Galak Fyyar (Steve Blum), an admiral in the Imperial Remnant and Desann's second-in-command; and Reelo Baruk (Kevin Michael Richardson), a crime lord with ties to the Imperial Remnant who poses as a "respectable garbage collector" on Nar Shaddaa. Throughout the game, players fight different types of enemies, including mercenaries and Imperial stormtroopers. Halfway through the story, lightsaber-wielding enemies are introduced, namely the Reborn (thugs and soldiers who have been artificially infused with the Force), and Shadowtroopers (who sport lightsaber-resistant cortosis armor that also allows them to briefly turn invisible).

=== Plot ===
As the game begins, Kyle Katarn and Jan Ors are investigating a supposedly abandoned Imperial outpost on Kejim, finding it to be crawling with Imperial forces. They fight their way through the base, discovering a research center studying crystals similar to those used to power lightsabers. Tracing the crystals' origin, Kyle and Jan travel to Artus Prime, a mining colony turned into an Imperial stronghold, where the miners have been enslaved and experimented upon. Katarn thwarts the Imperial operation, but Jan is captured by the Dark Jedi Desann and his apprentice Tavion. Kyle tries to rescue her, but he is easily defeated by Desann, who orders Tavion to kill Jan before they leave.

An enraged Kyle travels to the Valley of the Jedi (a place teeming with Force energy, featured in Dark Forces II) to regain his Force powers, and then on to the Jedi Academy on Yavin 4 to reclaim his lightsaber, which he had left with Luke Skywalker. Luke reveals Desann's origins as a former Academy student to Kyle, and senses his anger through the Force, so he requests that Kyle complete a series of trials to prove he will not succumb to the Dark Side again. Kyle passes the tests and obtains his lightsaber. On Luke's suggestion, Kyle travels to Nar Shaddaa to seek out Reelo Baruk, a Rodian gangster who is rumored to be working with Desann. While searching for Reelo, Kyle runs into Lando Calrissian, who has been imprisoned in Reelo's dungeons. Lando reveals that Reelo is part of a cortosis smuggling operation in Cloud City, which has been taken over by the Empire and Reelo's men. After Kyle frees Lando, the pair make their escape in the latter's ship, the Lady Luck, killing Reelo when he tries to stop them.

On Bespin, Lando drops Kyle off at the bottom of Cloud City. While making his way up the city structure, Kyle has his first encounters with the Reborn, Desann's Force-wielding soldiers. After helping Lando's men reclaim control of the city, Kyle finds and defeats Tavion, who, fearing for her life, reveals that Jan is alive and onboard Imperial Admiral Galak Fyyar's Star Destroyer, the Doomgiver: Jan's death had been faked as a ploy to trick Kyle into going to the Valley of the Jedi, which allowed Desann to follow him there and tap the Valley's power. Kyle spares Tavion and takes her ship to infiltrate the Doomgiver, which is docked at the Cairn Installation, an Imperial base hidden on an asteroid in the Lenico Belt.

At the base, Kyle runs into Luke, who informs him that Desann has used the Valley's energy to empower an army of Reborn which could number in the thousands. After fighting several Reborn together, Kyle and Luke split up to find the Doomgiver: along the way, Kyle has his first encounter with an armored version of the Reborn called the Shadowtrooper, and discovers that the base is actually an assault ship construction facility, which is preparing for a full-scale planetary assault. As Kyle boards the Doomgiver, he sees Luke fighting Desann outside the ship, but can't intervene: the Star Destroyer jumps into hyperspace with Kyle and Desann aboard, leaving Luke behind. Kyle uses the ship's communications array to contact Rogue Squadron, and finds Jan in the detention block, who reveals that Desann was interrogating her for information about the Jedi Academy, which he is invading. After killing Fyyar and destroying the Doomgiver's shield generator, which leaves the ship open for attack, Kyle escapes with Jan in a safe pod moments before Rogue Squadron destroy the Doomgiver.

Kyle and Jan arrive on Yavin 4 in the middle of the Imperial invasion, and split up: Jan goes to assist the New Republic starfighters, while Kyle makes his way to the Jedi Academy on foot. After helping the Jedi students and Republic soldiers fend off the assault, Kyle ventures into the Academy's underground maze and confronts Desann as he tries to absorb the power from the Force nexus at the centre. Kyle informs Desann of the Doomgiver's destruction and the Imperial army's defeat, and offers him the chance to rejoin the Jedi, but an enraged Desann refuses and attacks him. Kyle kills Desann and returns to the surface, where he reunites with Jan, as the New Republic arrests the surviving Imperial forces. Later, Luke thanks Kyle and Jan for their assistance, and offers to safeguard the former's lightsaber once more, but Kyle politely refuses, saying he is not ready to forsake the Force again.

== Voice cast ==
- Jeff Bennett as Kyle Katarn, Stormtrooper Officer 1
- Billy Dee Williams as Lando Calrissian
- Mark Klastorin as Desann
- Vanessa Marshall as Jan Ors
- Kath Soucie as Tavion
- Nick Jameson as Bartender, Imperial Worker 3
- Gregg Berger as Bespin Cop 1, Shadow Trooper 1, Stormtrooper 2
- Charles Martinet as Bespin Cop 2, Civilian Male, Imperial Officer 2
- Steven Jay Blum as Galak Fyyar, Reborn 1
- Jess Harnell as Gran 1, Rogue Leader
- Kevin Michael Richardson as Gran 2, Reelo
- Guy Siner as Imperial Officer 1, Imperial Worker 2
- Roger Jackson as Imperial Worker 1, Rebel Shock Troop 1
- Dominic Armato as Jedi 1, Prisoner 1, Protocol Droid
- Milton James as Jedi 2
- Bob Bergen as Luke Skywalker
- Carolyn Seymour as Mon Mothma
- Jacob Witkin as Morgan Katarn
- David Berón as Prisoner 2
- Michael Sorich as Prisoner 3, Rebel Shock Trooper
- Tom Kane as Reborn 2, Rodian 1, Shadow Trooper
- Aron Kincaid as Reborn 3
- Michael Gough as Rodian 2, Stormtrooper Officer 2
- Fred Coffin as Stormtrooper 1

== Development ==
On May 17, 2001, at E3 2001, LucasArts announced that Raven Software were developing a third game in the Jedi Knight series. Some plot details were given, such as the locations visited in the game; Cloud City, Yavin IV, Smuggler's Moon and some planets original to the game. The following day at E3, LucasArts gave a demonstration of the game, showing the lightsaber and Force combat as well as the "buddy" system: in which certain NPCs would fight alongside the player. Technical details were also revealed: the game would use id Software's Quake III Arena engine, and the GHOUL 2 animation system, seen in Raven's Soldier of Fortune II: Double Helix. The polygon capacity of the engine had also been doubled. The game was also on display at id's QuakeCon 2001, where enemy AI and combat were demonstrated. LucasArts announced that the game would feature multiplayer, although due to being early in development little information was revealed.

On July 17, 2001, multiplayer developer Pat Lipo made a post on his .plan file, revealing that Rich Whitehouse had been brought onto the development team to handle development of the game's multiplayer bots. Whitehouse moved on to tackle the entirety of the game's multiplayer codebase, and was subsequently credited as the game's sole multiplayer programmer. Designer Chris Foster has stated that most members of the team had many responsibilities due to its small size. One of the main tools used to design levels was Radiant.

On January 16, 2002, LucasArts launched a new website for Jedi Outcast featuring an overview of the game and information regarding characters, weapons and Force powers. An FAQ, screenshots, concept art, images of player models and downloadable wallpapers were also available. A teaser trailer was released on February 8, showing the game's combat, weapons, characters and environments. On March 13, 2002, LucasArts announced that the game was on track for release later in the month. Two days later, they announced Jedi Outcast was ready for release, set to go on sale by March 29. A new trailer was also released. After the release, game programmer Mike Gummelt revealed that a request from the management led the team to disable the ability to sever the heads of non-droid enemies. He has also cited Bushido Blade as the inspiration for a lightsaber combat system which requires players to wait and strike at the right moment.

=== Release ===
Jedi Outcast shipped on March 26, 2002, and was released on March 28, 2002.

The game's SDK was released on April 22, 2002. This included a level editor, map compiler, model viewer, and shader editor and viewer. Since its release, hundreds of mods have been submitted to sites such as FileFront. A 66 MB demo of the game was released on May 10, 2002, featuring the same level shown in an incomplete form at E3 2001, which did not feature in the final version. Two patches were subsequently released: version 1.03 and 1.04.

At E3 2002, LucasArts announced that Jedi Outcast would be released on the GameCube and Xbox. On May 31, 2002, LucasArts and Aspyr announced that a Macintosh version of the game would be released. Developed by Westlake Interactive, a version for Mac OS X was released on October 28, 2002. The Xbox and GameCube versions were released on November 19 in North America and three days later on November 22 in Europe.

On November 15, 2006, LucasArts announced that Jedi Outcast would feature with Star Wars: Battlefront, Star Wars: Empire at War, Star Wars: Knights of the Old Republic, Star Wars: Republic Commando and a 14-day trial of Star Wars Galaxies in a compilation release entitled Star Wars: The Best of PC. It was released during the 2006 holiday season.

A Nintendo Switch and PlayStation 4 port was announced on September 4, 2019; with a release date of September 24, 2019.

=== Source-code release ===
Following Disney's decision to close LucasArts on April 3, 2013, the developers at Raven Software released the source code for the game on SourceForge under GNU GPL-2.0-only. A few days after release, the source code disappeared from SourceForge without explanation. SourceForge later explained to media outlet Kotaku that Raven Software had requested its removal. Kotaku speculated this was due to the presence of licensed code, such as for the Bink Video format from Rad Game Tools, that was not intended to be made public.

However, prior to the removal a fork called "OpenJK" was created on GitHub with the problematic code parts already excised. The goal of the OpenJK community project is to "maintain and improve Jedi Academy + Jedi Outcast released by Raven Software." This includes the unification of the Jedi Outcast and Jedi Academy engines, maintaining the compatibility of previous releases, and providing source ports for Mac and Linux. Daily builds for Windows and early Linux builds are also available.

== Reception ==
Reception

Aggregate score
Aggregator	Score		
Aggregator	GameCube	PC	Xbox
Metacritic	75/100	89/100	81/100

Review scores
Publication	Score		
Publication	GameCube	PC	Xbox
AllGame		4/5	3.5/5
Electronic Gaming Monthly			7.83/10
Eurogamer		7/10	6/10
Game Informer	8.75/10	9.5/10	9/10
GamePro	3/5	4.5/5	4.5/5
GameRevolution		A-	B+
GameSpot	8.2/10	9/10	8.3/10
GameSpy	3.5/5	4/5	
GameZone	7.8/10	9.6/10	9.2/10
IGN	7.2/10	9/10	8.8/10
Nintendo Power	3.7/5		
Official Xbox Magazine (US)			9/10
PC Gamer (US)		91%	
Entertainment Weekly		A	
Maxim		8/10	
PC PowerPlay		90%	

=== PC ===
Star Wars Jedi Knight II: Jedi Outcast received "universal acclaim" from critics. The PC version holds an aggregate score of 89 out of 100 on Metacritic, based on thirty-five reviews.

Game Informer scored the game 9.5 out of 10, with reviewer Andrew Reiner calling it "the quintessential Star Wars game and a feast for all FPS devotees." He also wrote, "without question, Jedi Outcast is the most enjoyable and accomplished Star Wars game yet." He was also extremely impressed with multiplayer, calling it "a highly addictive, over-the-top experience that all FPS players must see to believe." Brian Gee of Game Revolution gave the game an A−. He praised how authentically 'Star Wars' the game felt, as well as the lightsaber interface, writing "I've played a ton of Star Wars games in my time, and I don't think any of them can match the excitement and fun of lightsaber play in Jedi Outcast."

IGN were also impressed, scoring the game 9 out of 10 and giving it an "Editor's Choice" award. Reviewer Steve Butts lauded the "tightly written, mature plot," and wrote "not only is this one of the greatest Star Wars games I've ever played, it's one of the best action games period." He also commended the "fantastic" graphics and "intelligent" level design, although he was critical of the puzzles, the lightsaber interface, and complained that "the game starts too slowly." GameSpot also scored the game 9 out of 10 and, like IGN, also gave it an "Editor's Choice" award. Reviewer Amer Ajami echoed IGN's criticisms of the "slow start" and "too much puzzle-solving." However, he was very impressed with the interface, arguing "never before has melee combat in a shooter been so effectively executed," and he concluded by saying "the game's strong points - especially its combat - overshadow whatever problems Jedi Outcast may have early on," calling it "simply one of the easiest games to recommend this year."

Game Over Online gave the game 93%, calling it "an intriguing juxtaposition of pieces of incredibly intense FPS action that had me on the edge of my seat combined with puzzle-like sections of such opacity that they made me want to kill myself." Entertainment Weekly gave it an A, stating that "the Force is strong with this one." Maxim, however, gave it an eight out of ten and stated that "The Force is strong with this polished first-person shooter."

In a negative review, X-Play criticized the game as a "disturbance in the Force." Although reviewer Jason D'Aprile called the story "pretty good," the graphics "fantastic" and the audio effects "just right," he complained that the level design "succumbs to the Dark Side," citing "illogical and frustrating situations." He also considered the multiplayer mode "not very impressive" and gave the game 2 out of 5 stars. Eurogamer were also underwhelmed, scoring the game 7 out of 10. They criticized the slow start, the lightsaber interface and the AI. However, they did commend the atmosphere and some of the level design. They concluded that "Jedi Outcast is a rather patchy game, with moments of genius let down by a lack of consistency. The guns are derivative and rarely used once you get hold of your lightsaber, the melee combat clumsy and chaotic, the AI poor and some of the locations derivative and poorly designed."

In June 2007, GameTrailers's list of the 10 best Star Wars games saw Jedi Outcast rank at number one, with the editorial commenting that "This was certainly not the first time players had the opportunity to play as a Jedi in a video game, it was the first time you actually felt like one." They also praised the lightsaber and Force combat systems, a story which they felt was consistent with the films, and the cameos from some key Star Wars characters (namely Luke Skywalker and Lando Calrissian).

Jedi Outcast was nominated for Computer Gaming World's 2002 "Action Game of the Year" award, which ultimately went to Medal of Honor: Allied Assault. The editors wrote, "Jedi Knight II is a blast, and the force powers and lightsaber control are perfectly executed." However, they found it too lacking in originality and consistency to win the award. During the 6th Annual Interactive Achievement Awards, Jedi Outcast received a nomination for "Computer Action/Adventure Game of the Year" by the Academy of Interactive Arts & Sciences.

=== Xbox and GameCube ===
Consoles versions received "generally positive" reviews. The Xbox version holds an aggregate score of 81 out of 100 on Metacritic, based on twenty-four reviews. The GameCube version holds scores of 75 out of 100 on Metacritic, based on seventeen reviews.

The Xbox version was described as "truly fantastic" by the Official Xbox Magazine, who scored it 9 out of 10. IGN were also impressed, scoring it 8.8 out of 10 and calling it "the best Star Wars experience on the Xbox". Reviewer Aaron Boudling praised how the controls had been mapped onto the Xbox Controller, but was highly critical of the game's lack of support for Xbox Live, and the absence of an online multiplayer mode. He also felt the graphics in the cutscenes were significantly weaker than the PC version. GameSpot scored it 8.3 out of 10, with reviewer Amer Ajami saying the port "retains the essence of what it must feel like to be an all-powerful Jedi, which was so well conveyed in the original PC game, without sacrificing much in the way of graphics, playability, or overall value. In fact, the game's complicated control scheme is better served on an Xbox controller than it is in the PC's typical mouse and keyboard setup." However, he too criticized the lack of Xbox Live support and the poor graphical quality of the cutscenes. Game Revolution gave the game a B+, praising the controls and atmosphere, but criticizing the AI and lack of Xbox Live support. Eurogamer were as unimpressed with the Xbox version as they had been with the PC version, scoring it 6 out of 10. Reviewer Kristan Reed found a lot of the problems with the game to be inherent to the original, not problems with the port - a slow beginning, poor AI, bad level design, repetitive puzzles. Reed called the lack of Xbox Live support "plain unacceptable" and concluded "Jedi Outcast is certainly an entertaining package when it gets things right, but it's also riddled with design flaws, technical flaws and various minor irritations that conspire to detract from your overall enjoyment. Given that it's also not Live (or even LAN) enabled, Xbox owners don't even have that crumb of comfort to elevate its status."

GameSpot scored the GameCube version 8.2 out of 10. As with the Xbox version, Ajami was critical of the cutscene graphics, but concluded that "Jedi Knight II: Jedi Outcast makes a fine addition to the Nintendo console's gradually growing list of action games." GameSpy gave the same version three-and-a-half stars out of five. Reviewer Scott Steinberg was critical of the game's slow start and the nature of some of the puzzles. Of the port, he wrote "This game was an award-winning game on a prior platform, so you'd be in the right to demand more. But from the perspective of a GameCube owner just getting your first taste of the galactic goodie that is the Jedi Knight series, things could have been a lot worse [...] Jedi Knight II: Outcast stands as a respectable effort, but disappointing reminder that when you swap content from platform to platform, something often gets lost in the transition." IGN scored it 7.2 out of 10, with reviewer Aaron Boudling arguing that the graphics and controls were significantly poorer than in either the PC or Xbox versions. Of the controls, Boulding wrote "While the Xbox version allows you to map your favorite moves to the black and white buttons for quick access, GameCube owners are out of luck and will have to fumble around with the D-Pad in the heat of battle." He concluded "It's obvious that no work at all went into trying to get this game to properly run on GameCube. The framerate is erratic and constantly alternates between smooth and choppy, further complicating the already clunky control system [...] If you're a multi-console owner, get the superior Xbox version to see a better realized port." Nintendo World Report scored it 6 out of 10, also citing the inferior controls and poorer graphics than the PC and Xbox versions; "Jedi Outcast ends up being a pretty terrible port of an excellent PC title. The trick to enjoying the GameCube incarnation will be coming to terms with the control and graphic inadequacies in the game and then being able to make yourself get over the "hump" so that you can enjoy the meat and potatoes of the whole experience."

It was a runner-up for GameSpot's annual "Best Shooter on GameCube" award, which went to TimeSplitters 2.

=== Sales ===
In the United States, Jedi Outcast's computer version sold 390,000 copies and earned $17 million (~$26.1 million in 2025) by August 2006. At the time, this led Edge to declare it the country's 39th-best-selling computer game, and best-selling Jedi Knight computer title, released since January 2000. Combined sales of all Jedi Knight computer games released during the 2000s, including Jedi Outcast, reached 920,000 units in the United States by August 2006. Jedi Outcast's computer version also received a "Silver" sales award from the Entertainment and Leisure Software Publishers Association (ELSPA), indicating sales of at least 100,000 copies in the United Kingdom.

In the German market, Jedi Knight II debuted as the best-selling full-price computer game of April 2002. It dropped to fifth place in May, 11th in June and 21st in July. In August, the Verband der Unterhaltungssoftware Deutschland (VUD) presented Jedi Knight II with a "Gold" certification, for sales of at least 100,000 units across Germany, Austria and Switzerland. Despite the early success of Jedi Knight II's computer version in the German market, it lost momentum at retail, reaching around 150,000 units sold by May 2003. The game's distributor attributed this to widespread illegal copying.

== See also ==
- List of formerly proprietary software
- List of open source games
