= Star Wars: Dark Forces =

1995 video game

- MS-DOS cover art
- Developer: LucasArts (Note: The remastered version was developed by Nightdive Studios.)
- Publisher: LucasArts (Note: The remastered version was published by Nightdive Studios.)
- Director: Daron Stinnett
- Designers: Daron Stinnett; Ray Gresko; Justin Chin
- Programmers: Daron Stinnett; Ray Gresko; Winston Wolff
- Artists: Justin Chin; Collette Michaud
- Writer: Justin Chin
- Composer: Clint Bajakian
- Series: Star Wars: Jedi Knight
- Engine: Jedi (Note: KEX Engine was used for the remaster.)
- Platforms: MS-DOS; Mac OS; PlayStation; Nintendo Switch; PlayStation 4; PlayStation 5; Windows; Xbox One; Xbox Series X/S
- Release: March 8, 1995: MS-DOS; NA: March 8, 1995; EU: March 10, 1995; Mac OS; NA/EU: 1995; PlayStation; NA: November 26, 1996; Nintendo Switch, Windows, PS4, PS5, Xbox One, Xbox Series X/S; February 28, 2024
- Genre: First-person shooter
- Mode: Single-player

Star Wars: Dark Forces is a first-person shooter video game developed and published by LucasArts. It was released in 1995 for MS-DOS and Macintosh, and in 1996 for the PlayStation. The story is set in the Star Wars expanded universe and begins shortly before the original Star Wars film, before flashing forward to a year after the film's events. The game's protagonist and playable character is Kyle Katarn, a mercenary working on behalf of the Rebel Alliance who discovers the Galactic Empire's secret Dark Trooper Project, which involves the development of a series of powerful new battle droids and power-armored stormtroopers.

Dark Forces uses the Jedi game engine, which was developed specifically for the game. The engine adds gameplay features that were uncommon to the first-person shooter genre at the time of release, including level designs with multiple floors, and the ability to look up and down.

Upon release, the PC and Macintosh versions of the game received generally favorable reviews from critics, who praised its level design and technological advances, though the PlayStation version was criticized for having poor graphics and slow frame rates. The game also did well financially, selling almost 1 million copies in the United States by 1999. The game's success launched the Star Wars: Jedi Knight series, beginning with the direct sequel Star Wars Jedi Knight: Dark Forces II in 1997.

A continually developed community made port entitled The Force Engine reached 1.0 on December 20, 2022. A remastered version of the game developed by Nightdive Studios was released on Nintendo Switch, PlayStation 4, PlayStation 5, Windows, Xbox One, and Xbox Series X/S on February 28, 2024.

== Gameplay ==
The player engaging a Dark Trooper

Dark Forces is a first-person shooter (FPS). The player controls Kyle Katarn from a first-person perspective, with a focus on combat against various creatures and characters from the Star Wars universe, although the game also includes environmental puzzles and hazards. Dark Forces follows a central storyline outlined in mission briefings and cutscenes. Each mission includes specific objectives which are related to the story. The missions take place in a variety of environments across the Star Wars universe, including a Star Destroyer interior, Jabba the Hutt's yacht, and the planet Coruscant, where the player must infiltrate a computer vault.

Dark Forces' gameplay expands on the FPS standards set by Doom in 1993, and features gameplay elements that are now common in the FPS genre. These include the ability to look up and down, duck, and jump. A variety of power-ups are made available to the player, including health, shields, weapons and ammunition. The game also features several non-combat items to aid the player. The head lamp illuminates the area in front of the player, but will reveal the player's position to enemies in dark rooms. Ice cleats provide traction in icy areas, and an air mask protects the player from areas with toxic atmosphere. Many inventory items are powered by batteries (separate from weapon ammunition types) which can be found around the levels.

For combat, the player may use fists, explosive land mines and thermal detonators, as well as blasters and other ranged weapons. All player weapons except the fist require ammunition, which can be collected in power-ups. All weapons, again with the exception of the fist, have a secondary mode which makes it have a different effect than in primary mode. The player has health and shields which are damaged by enemy attacks and some environmental hazards, and may be replenished through power-ups.

In addition to combat, Dark Forces provides physical obstacles for the character, such as jumping from ledges or traversing across flowing rivers, and includes multi-step puzzles such as mazes controlled by switches.

== Plot ==
The storyline of Dark Forces follows Kyle Katarn, a mercenary employed by the Rebel Alliance. Before the game's events, Kyle was preparing for a career in agricultural mechanics like his father, but ended up joining the Imperial Academy after his parents were supposedly murdered by Rebels, whom he grew to hate. After graduating from the Academy and joining the Imperial Army, Kyle met Jan Ors, a double agent working for the Rebels, who had uncovered the truth about his parents' death: the Empire had them killed, and not the Rebels, as Imperial officials had told him. This revelation caused Kyle to distrust the Empire, and he eventually defected to rescue Jan, who was arrested for supplying information to the Rebels. Escaping from the Empire together, the pair became mercenaries, and eventually began taking jobs from the Rebel Alliance, because of Kyle's hatred towards the Empire.

Dark Forces begins with Kyle and Jan being hired by the Alliance to recover the plans to the Death Star, the Empire's space station outfitted with a superlaser capable of destroying an entire planet. The Rebels use the plans to find a weakness in the station and eventually destroy it.

1 year later, the Alliance hires the pair again, this time to investigate an assault on one of their bases by a new type of Imperial soldiers. Kyle's investigation unveils the Dark Trooper Project, headed by General Rom Mohc. His mission to stop the project takes him to the sewers of Anoat City, where he captures Moff Rebus, an Imperial weapons specialist who developed the weapons used by Dark Troopers. Rebus' interrogation leads him to a weapons research facility in the mountains of Fest and the Gromas mines, where minerals are extracted for the Dark Troopers.

Kyle and Jan later learn that Crix Madine, a former Imperial Commander who defected to the Alliance, has been captured by the Empire, and the former infiltrates a high-security detention center on Orinackra to rescue him. After Kyle saves him from execution, Madine informs the Alliance of an operation to smuggle Dark Trooper materials, leading Kyle and Jan to investigate the Ramsees Hed docking port on Cal-Seti. Afterward, Kyle also destroys a robotics facility on the icy planet Anteevy, the second stage of the Dark Trooper production line. Kyle and Jan's mission is temporarily halted when they are captured by the crime lord Jabba the Hutt, one of the main financiers of the Dark Trooper Project. After escaping from Jabba's clutches and an encounter with the bounty hunter Boba Fett, hired by General Mohc to kill Kyle, the pair travel to Coruscant, where Kyle infiltrates a computer vault which reveals the location of the Ergo fuel station, the final stage of the smuggling route.

Masquerading as a smuggler, Kyle infiltrates the Super Star Destroyer Executor and then the Arc Hammer starship, General Mohc's headquarters, and the location of the Dark Trooper Project's final stage. After killing Mohc (wearing Dark Trooper armor), Kyle destroys the ship and escapes. At the same time, Darth Vader watches from the Executor, commenting that the Dark Trooper Project's destruction is an unfortunate setback and that the Force is strong with Katarn. For his bravery and heroic actions, Kyle is awarded the Star of Alderaan by the Alliance.

== Development ==
Development of Dark Forces was led by Daron Stinnett. The programming was led by Ray Gresko, and the graphics and storyline by Justin Chin. Production began in September 1993, at a time when the first-person shooter genre was very popular. The idea of creating a first-person shooter in the Star Wars universe was inspired by fan mods of Doom which had levels set on the Death Star. The developers of Dark Forces wanted to adapt the FPS format into an adventure game. To do this they introduced puzzles and strategy, along with a Star Wars plot. Originally Luke Skywalker was intended to be the main character in the game; however, the developers realized that this would add constraints to gameplay and storyline, so they created the character of Kyle Katarn to provide them with more freedom.

The Jedi game engine used in Dark Forces allows atmospheric effects such as red haze.

New gameplay mechanisms that were not common in the first-person shooter genre at the time of release include the ability to look up and down, duck, jump, and swim. The use of multiple floor levels is another technical advance in the first-person shooter genre. To produce these new features, the developers wrote a game engine from scratch. The Jedi game engine can create gameplay and graphical elements such as fully 3D objects, atmospheric effects such as fog and haze, animated textures and shading. Stinnett indicated that the developers wanted these elements to be part of an "active environment," and features were included to create this: "ships come and go at the flight decks, rivers sweep along, platforms and conveyor belts move and much of the machinery functions."

The Dark Troopers in Dark Forces were created specifically for the game by Justin Chin and Paul Mica. Chin notes that they were designed as a more advanced enemy when compared to standard stormtroopers: "Instead of just beefing up the stormtroopers, I designed them to be more efficient. I wanted something more terrifying and more omnipotent." Three designs for the Dark Troopers were produced for Dark Forces. Lucasfilm licensing department initially rejected two of the designs for looking too much out of character, so Chin produced new designs which were ultimately approved. The development team collaborated with staff at Skywalker Ranch for the sounds, music, and costumes used in the cutscenes.

Dark Forces was ported from DOS to Apple Macintosh. This presented several challenges for the developers. LucasArts requested the game to be produced for both DOS and Macintosh with the same system requirements, specifically the random-access memory (RAM). The Mac OS runs a graphical user interface which uses up RAM while DOS does not, meaning the Macintosh version has less RAM available for Dark Forces to use. Aaron Giles, who was the Macintosh programmer for Dark Forces, explained that to resolve this problem the memory had to be managed more efficiently.

=== Music ===
Music for Star Wars: Dark Forces was mostly original works composed by Clint Bajakian, though they are based on cues from John Williams' original Star Wars works through the utilization of the iMUSE system to create interactive music. The game also features full speech and sound effects in stereo.

== Release ==
Dark Forces achieved a strong following on the internet, and custom levels and maps were created for the game. The popularity of characters from Dark Forces resulted in LucasArts licensing toys based on the game. Hasbro produced Kyle Katarn and Dark Trooper toys, which are among Star Wars in other media items to be turned into action figures. The Dark Troopers were also included in books and comics, and later became canon in The Mandalorian's Chapter 14: The Tragedy. William C. Dietz's novelizations of the Dark Forces storyline were adapted to full-cast audio dramatizations.

LucasArts extended Dark Forces with Star Wars Jedi Knight: Dark Forces II in 1997, and later two more sequels. The Jedi Knight series continues the story of Kyle Katarn and has been praised for its quality as a whole.

In September 2009, Dark Forces was re-released as a downloadable version on Valve's Steam network for Windows XP, 2000 and Vista, and OS X Mavericks. The game is available to purchase individually or as part of a package including all of the games in the Jedi Knight series. however, on April 14, 2026, the original game is no longer available for purchase, but the remaster is still available.

== Reception ==
=== Critical reviews ===
Reception

Aggregate score
| Aggregator | Score | | |
| Aggregator | Macintosh | PC | PS |
|---|---|---|---|
| GameRankings | | | 60% |

Review scores
| Publication | Score | | |
| Publication | Macintosh | PC | PS |
|---|---|---|---|
| AllGame | | 4.5/5 | |
| Electronic Gaming Monthly | | | 4.875/10 |
| GameSpot | | 7.6/10 | 5.4/10 |
| IGN | | | 5/10 |
| Next Generation | 4/5 | 3/5 | 3/5 |
| PC Gamer (US) | | 92% | |
| PC Zone | | 95% | |
| MacUser | 4.5/5 | | |

The PC and Macintosh versions of Star Wars: Dark Forces were well received. Publications compared Dark Forces to Doom, a significant video game in the first-person shooter genre at the time, but also indicated that Dark Forces improved upon Doom's features. Criticisms tended to focus on the game being too short, as well as lacking a multiplayer feature.

Steven Kent of The Seattle Times believed that the general aspects of the game appeal to most computer gamers, not just Star Wars fans. Kent argued that the Star Wars setting is a high point for the game, saying that the level designs recreate the Star Wars style well: "Though most of the Dark Forces sets are original to the game, they were created in the 'Star Wars' spirit."

Dark Forces' gameplay has been described as "challenging" and has generally received praise. Ron Dulin, reviewing the game for GameSpot, highlights the implementation of puzzles within levels: "The levels are diverse and ingenious, with plenty of creative obstacles standing between you and your goal. While they can be occasionally frustrating, Dark Forces' diverse gameplay requirements make this title more mentally challenging than your average key hunt." The graphics and sound were both praised as helping to immerse the player in the environment.

The PlayStation version of Dark Forces received less positive reviews. It held an aggregate score on GameRankings of 60%. GameSpot wrote, "Though the speed of the Playstation allows for smooth movement, Dark Forces boasts a horrendously choppy frame rate." IGN made a similar point; "Unlike the PC and Mac versions, PlayStation Dark Forces is grainier than a loaf of bread. Close up, everything is blocky and pixelated, but even from far away the walls and textures look like big, chunky blocks. Even worse than the graphics, though, is the frame rate. Or lack thereof. The choppy motion takes so much away from the enjoyment of actually playing the game." The four reviewers of Electronic Gaming Monthly agreed that the choppy frame rate interferes with the gameplay, which in combination with some control issues make the game frustrating to play, and a disappointment in light of its strong performance on PC. Alex Constantides of Computer and Video Games offers the same view, saying that the game is "visually dated." GamePro's Major Mike praised the action, depth of gameplay, weapons, sound effects, music, and graphic effects, but said the choppy frame rate and slowdown "plague most of the game", and compared the game unfavorably to Doom and PowerSlave. Next Generation noted that "Dark Forces fails on some technical levels as a port", but commented positively on the variety of level designs, challenge level, and use of audio, and concluded more favorably, "Not quite as intense as Doom or Disruptor, but surely better than crap like Kileak, Dark Forces will certainly satisfy Star Wars fans looking for their own little touch of the force."

Next Generation reviewed the PC version of the game, and stated that "Dark Forces will be judged by Doom's standards and, in most of the crucial areas, it falls just short." Next Generation reviewed the Macintosh version of the game, and stated that "Purposeful mission objectives [...] and various neato features [...] lift Dark Forces out of the faceless swamp of first-person crawlers and into a place of honor. A very classy job." MacUser named Dark Forces one of the top 50 CD-ROMs of 1995.

Pyramid magazine reviewed Dark Forces for and recommended the game to players who "like diving into enemy bases and killing and killing and killing".

PC Gamer gave Dark Forces the award in the best sound effects of 1995. It was also a runner-up in the best action game category.

=== Sales ===
Dark Forces shipped more than 300,000 copies in preparation for its launch, a record for LucasArts at that time. It debuted at #1 on PC Data's monthly computer game sales chart for March 1995. In 1998, it was the third-highest-selling game for Mac OS.

According to PC Data, which tracked sales in the United States, Dark Forces had sold 928,469 units and earned $37.1 million in revenue in the United States. This led PC Data to declare it the country's ninth-best-selling computer game for the period between January 1993 and April 1998. Sales in the region rose to 952,033 copies by September 1999; by that time, it was the country's 11th-best-selling computer game since January 1993.
