= Kyle Katarn =

Fictional character from Star Wars

- Star Wars character
- Jason Court portraying Kyle Katarn in a full motion video cutscene from Jedi Knight: Dark Forces II.
- First appearance: Star Wars: Dark Forces (1995)
- Created by: Justin Chin
- Portrayed by: Jason Court

Kyle Katarn is a character in the Star Wars franchise. Created by LucasArts artist and writer Justin Chin, he first appeared as the player character of the 1995 first-person shooter Star Wars: Dark Forces. Initially depicted as a former Imperial soldier and politically unaffiliated mercenary working for the Rebel Alliance, Katarn became the central protagonist of the Star Wars: Jedi Knight series, which developed him into a reluctant hero rather than an idealised Jedi, and later an instructor at Luke Skywalker's Jedi academy.

Katarn was created as a new protagonist through whom players could enter the Star Wars setting without the narrative restrictions associated with an established film character. His character combines elements of Luke Skywalker's progression toward becoming a Jedi with Han Solo's mercenary persona. Dark Forces II allowed players to direct him toward the light or dark side of the Force, although later works continued from its light-side ending. Katarn also appeared in illustrated novellas, comics, audio dramas and other video games.

Following Lucasfilm's 2014 restructuring of Star Wars continuity, his principal stories were placed within the Star Wars Legends continuity. Critical discussion has focused on his function as a player avatar and on the tension between his established heroic identity and the player's access to powers conventionally associated with villains. Some critics praised his adaptability, moral flexibility and grounded mercenary background, while others considered him derivative or insufficiently coherent.

== Development ==
=== Concept and Creation ===
LucasArts initially considered using Luke Skywalker as the protagonist of Dark Forces, but instead created an original character to avoid restricting the story and the player's actions to those considered appropriate for an established film character. Dark Forces director Daron Stinnett credited artist and writer Justin Chin with devising the game's story, characters and visual direction. Chin introduced Katarn as a politically unaffiliated mercenary who gradually becomes committed to the Rebel Alliance rather than beginning as a conventional heroic soldier.

Designer Christopher Foster described Katarn as a reluctant protagonist who responds to threats out of necessity rather than actively seeking a heroic role. Programmer Yves Borckmans said that the later games were intended to reproduce Luke Skywalker's journey toward becoming a Jedi while allowing the player, rather than Luke, to occupy the central heroic position. Retro Gamer characterised the original Katarn as a lightly defined first-person viewpoint through whom players could inhabit the Star Wars universe.

Katarn's mercenary background and scepticism drew comparisons with Han Solo, while his family history, Force sensitivity and progression toward becoming a Jedi resembled Luke's narrative. The first game primarily presents him through briefing scenes and illustrated images, whereas Dark Forces II makes his personal history and relationship with the Force central to the narrative and introduces lightsaber combat and Force abilities.

Raven Software continued Katarn's story in Star Wars Jedi Knight II: Jedi Outcast. Foster said that the developers wanted the lightsaber to feel like an extension of the player rather than a simple weapon. Because Katarn begins the game having abandoned the Force, Raven delayed the restoration of his lightsaber and abilities so that their return would serve as a major moment in both the character's story and the player's progression.

In Star Wars Jedi Knight: Jedi Academy, Raven replaced Katarn as the playable character with the customisable student Jaden Korr. Co-project lead Jon Zuk said the team considered retaining Katarn but concluded that his established status as a powerful Jedi would undermine the planned structure of a game about gradually learning Force abilities. Katarn was instead made Jaden's instructor so that he would remain integral to the series while allowing the player to begin as an inexperienced character.

=== Player choice ===
Dark Forces II allowed players to develop Katarn toward either the light or dark side of the Force. Harming civilians affected a morality scale, while the player's conduct and selection of Force abilities contributed to one of two endings. In the light-side ending Katarn rejects the power of the Valley of the Jedi; in the alternate ending he claims it and replaces the defeated Jerec.

Retro Gamer observed that the branching ending created a continuity problem when LucasArts continued Katarn's story through a single narrative. Mysteries of the Sith and the later games proceeded from the light-side outcome while retaining his familiarity with powers associated with both sides of the Force. Entertainment Weekly later considered that tension central to the character, describing Katarn as a heroic figure whom players could nevertheless make use Force lightning, choking abilities and other powers traditionally associated with villains.

=== Portrayal ===
Nick Jameson voiced Katarn in Dark Forces, in which the character appeared in illustrated cutscenes rather than live-action footage. Jason Court portrayed him in the full-motion video sequences of Dark Forces II, and the game's polygonal character model was based on Court's appearance. Court's likeness was subsequently used as the basis for depictions of Katarn in later games, fiction and merchandise.

Rino Romano voiced Katarn in Mysteries of the Sith, while Jeff Bennett performed the role in Jedi Outcast and Jedi Academy. Court said in 2025 that he would be willing to return if the character were revived.

== Appearances ==
Katarn first appears in Dark Forces as a former Imperial soldier working as an independent mercenary for the Rebel Alliance. The game uses him to place the player inside events surrounding the original film trilogy, including the theft of the first Death Star's plans and the destruction of the Empire's Dark Trooper project. In Dark Forces II, Katarn discovers his connection to the Force while pursuing Jerec, the Dark Jedi responsible for his father's death. The game expands his identity from gunfighter to potential Jedi and allows the player to determine whether he accepts or abuses the power he discovers.

Mysteries of the Sith depicts Katarn after his exposure to the dark side and shifts part of the playable role to Mara Jade. In Jedi Outcast, he has renounced the Force and returned to mercenary work, but resumes his Jedi identity after being drawn into a conflict with the Imperial Remnant. Jedi Academy makes him an instructor and supporting character rather than the player protagonist.

Katarn's game history was expanded through three illustrated novellas by William C. Dietz: Dark Forces: Soldier for the Empire, Dark Forces: Rebel Agent, and Dark Forces: Jedi Knight. The books elaborate on his Imperial service, defection, relationship with Jan Ors and discovery of the Valley of the Jedi. He subsequently appeared in other works from the former Star Wars Expanded Universe, including novels, comics and additional games.

== Reception and legacy ==
=== Critical reception ===
Critical response to Katarn has divided between praise for his accessibility as a player-oriented Star Wars hero and criticism that his character combines derivative or incompatible elements. His progression from mercenary to Jedi has been treated both as a sustained character arc and as the loss of the quality that originally distinguished him.

Darren Franich of Entertainment Weekly described Katarn as a paradoxical hero. Franich considered him a combination of Luke Skywalker's Force abilities and Han Solo's gunfighter traits, but argued that the games' moral choices distinguished him by allowing a conventionally heroic protagonist to use powers usually associated with villains. Ben Griffin of PC Gamer praised Katarn's combination of mercenary and Jedi characteristics in Jedi Outcast, calling his recovery of the Force and use of both blasters and a lightsaber central to the game's fulfilment of the player's Star Wars fantasy. IGN ranked him twenty-second among Star Wars characters, describing him as a comparatively adaptable player surrogate whose mixture of characteristics made him appear more human than less flexible heroes.

Contemporary and retrospective commentary also connected Katarn's appeal to the games' first-person perspective. Electronic Gaming Monthly compared him with Han Solo and considered his status as a rogue with a conscience well suited to a first-person shooter. Deirdre Coyle of Unwinnable wrote that her attachment to Katarn developed through spending an extended period inhabiting his viewpoint in Dark Forces. Although the game provided limited explicit characterisation, she regarded him as a companion constructed through play rather than conventional cinematic exposition.

Other assessments were less favourable. Time argued that Katarn's Imperial history, mercenary background, Jedi powers and conventional heroism competed rather than combined into a coherent personality. It described him as an evident attempt to merge the recognisable qualities of Luke and Han, and criticised the mismatch between his Jedi identity and the games' extensive arsenal of firearms. GamesRadar+ included him among poorly designed video-game characters, arguing that his original mercenary identity was more distinctive than his later portrayal as a Jedi.

The morality system also drew mixed responses. Retro Gamer noted that the option of a dark-side ending complicated the continuation of Katarn's story. Franich considered that flexibility one of the character's defining qualities, while Wes Fenlon of PC Gamer found the written story of Dark Forces II weak but praised the way its light- and dark-side abilities translated the Force into interactive systems.

The full-motion-video presentation received similarly mixed retrospective treatment. Time argued that its limited budget and dated appearance made Katarn's story seem removed from more prominent parts of the franchise. GameStar, by contrast, noted that Jason Court's appearance continued to provide the visual basis for Katarn in later games, novels and merchandise.

== Legacy ==
Katarn became the principal recurring character connecting Dark Forces with the later Jedi Knight games. The series follows his progression from Imperial soldier and mercenary to Jedi and, eventually, an instructor, while its gameplay correspondingly shifted from conventional first-person shooting toward an increasing emphasis on Force powers and lightsaber combat.

His position within the franchise changed after Lucasfilm redesignated the pre-2014 Expanded Universe as Star Wars Legends. Katarn has not returned as the same character within the later continuity, although retrospective coverage has continued to propose his revival or adaptation. In 2010, Time asked whether advances in game technology could support a new treatment of the character, while later Retro Gamer coverage identified Katarn among the Legends figures whose stories continued to influence perceptions of Star Wars games.

The 2024 remaster of Dark Forces made Katarn's original appearance available on contemporary platforms. In 2025, Hasbro announced a Kyle Katarn figure for its Star Wars: The Black Series line based on his appearance in Jedi Outcast. GamesRadar+ described the release as overdue recognition for a character from the older Star Wars games.
