= Jedi (game engine) =

Game engine developed for LucasArts

- Original author: Ray Gresko
- Developer: LucasArts
- Written in: C
- Operating system: MS-DOS, Mac OSSony PlayStation
- Type: Game engine
- License: Proprietary

Jedi is a game engine developed primarily by Ray Gresko for LucasArts. It is very similar to the Build engine used in Duke Nukem 3D. While not a true 3D engine, it supported a three-dimensional environment with no limitations in the 3rd dimension (Z). In Doom, environments or levels were limited to existing in the X-Y plane only – levels were laid out two-dimensionally: while floor and ceiling heights could differ, areas could not overlap vertically. The Jedi Engine had support for areas or rooms (called "sectors") on top of one another, a trait that it shared with the Build engine. In the Dark Forces revision of the engine, the renderer could not display two rooms situated on top of each other simultaneously. This capability was added for Outlaws.

== History ==
The Jedi Engine also included the ability to jump and crouch, the ability to look up and down, and atmospheric effects (achieved by careful manipulation of 256-color palette files). The engine is limited in its rendering capabilities, however, and used two-dimensional sprites (pre-rendered in different angles) for most of its object graphics. Other LucasArts technologies such as the iMuse sound system were incorporated.

During early development of the Jedi engine, project leader Daron Stinnett recalled one of the early challenges was around performance and rendering speed. When the Doom alpha was released with debugging information left in, the team was able to analyze the code which helped significantly accelerate their research and development process.

Its lifetime was short, and the engine was only used in two titles, Star Wars: Dark Forces and Outlaws. The sequel to Dark Forces, Jedi Knight, used the Sith engine.

There have been attempts of open source game engine recreations based on reverse engineering the original source code.
