= Star Wars Jedi Knight: Dark Forces II =

1997 video game

- Developer: LucasArts
- Publisher: LucasArts
- Director: Justin Chin
- Designer: Peter Chan
- Writer: Peter Chan
- Composer: Peter McConnell
- Series: Star Wars: Jedi Knight
- Platform: Windows
- Release: NA: October 9, 1997; EU: October 17, 1997
- Genres: First-person shooter, third-person shooter
- Modes: Single-player, multiplayer

Star Wars Jedi Knight: Dark Forces II is a 1997 first-person shooter video game developed and published by LucasArts for Windows. It is the sequel to 1995's Star Wars: Dark Forces and the second installment in the Star Wars: Jedi Knight series. The story, set in the Star Wars expanded universe one year after the film Return of the Jedi, follows returning protagonist Kyle Katarn, a mercenary working for the New Republic, who discovers his connection to the Force and "The Valley of the Jedi", an ancient source of power. With his father having been murdered years prior by the Dark Jedi Jerec and his followers over the Valley's location, Katarn embarks on a quest to confront his father's killers and find the Valley before they do.

Jedi Knight made some technical and gameplay improvements over its predecessor. It uses a more powerful game engine, the Sith engine, which supports 3D acceleration using Direct3D 5.0. The story features branching paths and cutscenes recorded with live actors as full motion videos. The game introduces the lightsaber and the Force as prominent gameplay elements in the series, as well as a multiplayer mode that allows players to compete over the internet or a local area network.

Jedi Knight received critical acclaim for its gameplay additions, narrative, and improvements over Dark Forces, and has been cited as one of the best video games of all time. An expansion pack, Mysteries of the Sith, was released in 1998, and a sequel, Jedi Knight II: Jedi Outcast, in 2002.

== Gameplay ==
=== Single-player ===
Jedi Knight is primarily a first-person shooter, although it does offer the choice of a third-person view. The game consists of twenty-one levels with objectives which the player must complete before being able to continue to the next level. There are weapons available in each level and after level three, the player has the use of a lightsaber, along with the Force. In addition to being an effective weapon, the lightsaber is also a useful tool for the player, providing light in dark areas, deflecting incoming blaster fire and cutting through some obstacles.

A battle with Imperial stormtroopers

There are three types of Force powers; light, dark and neutral. Light Force powers provide nonviolent advantages such as being able to restore health or persuade enemies to ignore the player. Dark Force powers are violent and give the ability to throw objects or choke enemies. Neutral powers enhance athletic abilities such as being able to jump higher or run faster. There are fourteen powers in total, four of each type and a bonus power in each light and dark if the Jedi stays true to that path. Players earn stars to allocate toward Force powers by completing specific levels. By finding all the secrets in a level, players can gain one bonus star to use. Between levels, the player can choose which Force powers to enhance by allocating stars to that power. Stars cannot be reclaimed from powers later on.

Some levels contain puzzles that may require use of the Force to overcome, or by locating certain objects in the level. There are a variety of hostile and non-hostile non-player characters (NPCs) within each level with whom the player can interact. Other enemies include monsters and vehicles. There are two endings to Jedi Knight, depending on how the player plays the game. If the player does not harm non-hostile NPCs and focuses on collecting light Force powers, the player will get the light side ending. Conversely, if the player harms non-hostile NPCs and collects dark Force powers, the game will end with the dark side ending.

=== Multiplayer ===
Jedi Knight includes a multiplayer mode that allows up to eight people to compete with one another on a local area network and up to thirty two people online. Online gaming was hosted by the MSN Gaming Zone. The player creates an avatar within Jedi Knight and selects a ranking. Lower rankings allow the player to select lower powers from both sides of the force, while higher rankings unlock higher powers for only one side. The player can edit their avatar's "skin" and lightsaber color. There are two types of game in Jedi Knight's multiplayer mode, "Capture the flag" and "Jedi Training", similar to deathmatch. The players can customize the settings to play a deathmatch the way they desire; for example, by limiting the use of Force powers or playing on teams.

== Plot ==
Jedi Knight takes place in the year 5 ABY, one year after Return of the Jedi and four years after Dark Forces. The Dark Jedi Jerec and his followers capture Jedi Master Qu Rahn, whom they interrogate over the location of the sacred Valley of the Jedi. After learning that Rahn's old friend, Morgan Katarn, knew the Valley's location, Jerec executes Rahn.

Meanwhile, Kyle Katarn, now working as a mercenary for the recently established New Republic, meets with an information broker droid called 8t88 on Nar Shaddaa for information regarding his father's death. 8t88 explains that Jerec killed Morgan and plans to reform the Galactic Empire before double-crossing Kyle, revealing himself to be on Jerec's payroll. After questioning Kyle about a data disk from Morgan that he cannot decipher, 8t88 runs away, but Kyle chases him to his shuttle. Before 8t88 can escape, Kyle severs his right arm, sending the disk plummeting into Nar Shaddaa's lower levels. Kyle recovers the disk before reuniting with his partner, Jan Ors, who takes him to a medical frigate to recover. While asleep, Rahn's Force spirit visits Kyle and explains that the disk contains information to lead him to the Valley and on the path to becoming a Jedi.

On Sulon, Jerec's Dark Jedi removed the map to the Valley from Morgan's workshop just as Kyle and Jan arrived. While exploring the workshop, Kyle finds his family's droid, WeeGee, who decodes the disk, unlocking a message from Morgan. He reveals that the map to the Valley was carved into the workshop's ceiling tiles and that he has left Rahn's old lightsaber for Kyle to use. Traveling to the city of Barons Hed, now a stronghold for the Imperial Remnant, Kyle fights his way to 8t88's chambers, where he finds the droid sending the deciphered map to Jerec. Before retrieving the map, Kyle is attacked by Yun, the youngest of Jerec's Dark Jedi. Kyle defeats Yun but chooses to spare his life.

Kyle and Jan follow 8t88 to Jerec's ship, the Sulon Star, where the droid was told to come to collect his payment. With the ship docked at a refueling station, Kyle infiltrates it through the fuel lines and finds that Jerec has double-crossed and destroyed 8t88. After defeating two of Jerec's Dark Jedi, Pic and Gorc, Kyle retrieves 8t88's head, which still contains the map to the Valley. After WeeGee deciphers it, Kyle and Jan head to the Valley and find the Sulon Star docked above. Kyle boards the ship again, battles another Dark Jedi, Maw, and kills him. Jerec arrives, holding Jan hostage, and orders Kyle to kill her.

If the player has followed the Light Side up to this point, Kyle refuses to do so; otherwise, he executes Jan and declares his intention to absorb the Valley's power. Either way, an enraged Jerec uses the Force to incapacitate Kyle and disable the Sulon Star. As the ship crashes into the canyon below and explodes, Kyle narrowly escapes in his ship, the Moldy Crow.

If Kyle follows the Dark Side, he is again confronted by Yun, whom he defeats and executes before heading off to find Jerec. If Kyle has followed the Light Side, he is captured by Jerec's remaining Dark Jedi: Yun, Sariss, and Boc Aseca. After Boc destroys Kyle's lightsaber, a redeemed Yun tries to protect him, but Sariss kills him. Using Yun's lightsaber, Kyle defeats Sariss and Boc before confronting Jerec. Partially empowered by the Valley, Jerec battles Kyle but is ultimately defeated.

If Kyle has followed the Dark Side, he executes Jerec and takes over the new Empire with Sariss at his side. If Kyle has followed the Light Side, he spares Jerec, having overcome his desire for revenge, but the Dark Jedi tries to attack him from behind, forcing Kyle to kill him. He then reunites with Jan and builds monuments in the Valley to honor his father and Rahn.

== Development ==
Development of Jedi Knight was led by Justin Chin, who had also worked on the previous game. The most significant developments for Jedi Knight are the use of the Force and the lightsaber. The Force plays an integral role in how the player plays the game and shapes the way the game is played. The method of allocating credits to Force powers was designed with a role-playing video game style in mind, allowing the player the choice of which powers to improve. Chin said in an early interview that progress in the game is based upon the abilities the player develops.

Jedi Knight uses both 3D graphics and surround sound through the Sith game engine, replacing the Jedi game engine used in Star Wars: Dark Forces. While the Jedi engine is a sector-based "2.5-D" engine similar to the Doom and Build engines, the Sith engine is a "true" 3D engine similar to the Quake and Unreal engines. It is one of the early games to adopt the use of 3D graphics hardware acceleration using Microsoft Direct3D. The 3D sound technology was tweaked extensively to give an immersive feel to the game. This was achieved by experimentation using many different sound effects and playback styles. Between levels, Jedi Knight features full motion video cutscenes. The characters are represented by live actors while the backgrounds are pre-rendered graphics. The cutscenes included the first lightsaber footage filmed since Return of the Jedi in 1983.

=== Mysteries of the Sith ===
After the release of Jedi Knight, LucasArts developed Star Wars Jedi Knight: Mysteries of the Sith as an expansion pack. It was released on February 17, 1998 and received positive reviews from critics. The expansion includes a single-player mode and fifteen multiplayer maps. There are technical improvements over Jedi Knight, including colored lighting, new textures and models, and developments to the artificial intelligence.

The single-player story in Mysteries of the Sith is set five years after the events of Jedi Knight. The player once more takes control of Kyle Katarn, but later in the game is given control of Mara Jade, one of the most popular Star Wars expanded universe characters.

== Reception ==
=== Sales ===
In the United States, Jedi Knight: Dark Forces II debuted at #3 on PC Data's monthly computer game sales chart for October 1997. It secured sixth place in November; by the 30th, the game had sold 155,060 copies and earned $7.36 million in the United States alone. After a 14th-place finish in December, Jedi Knight reached lifetime sales of 247,036 units in the country and became its 21st-best-selling computer game of 1997.

In 1998, Jedi Knight placed 20th in January and 16th in February. It was absent from March's top 20.

=== Critical reviews ===
Reception

Aggregate score
Aggregator	Score
Metacritic	91/100

Review scores
Publication	Score
AllGame	2.5/5
GameRevolution	A−
GameSpot	8.9/10
IGN	8/10
Next Generation	5/5
PC Gamer (US)	94%
PC Zone	94%

Star Wars Jedi Knight: Dark Forces II received "universal acclaim" from critics, according to review aggregator Metacritic. The game holds an aggregate score of 91 out of 100, based on ten reviews. The combination of puzzles and action drew praise from the New York Daily News, who indicated that the game builds upon the qualities found in Dark Forces. Gary Whitta of Next Generation stated that "The game has little to no faults; one could nitpick about the overacting or the rushed look of the menu interface, but in the end, Jedi Knight is to first-person shooters what sliced bread is to wheat products." GamePro gave it a perfect 5 out of 5 in all four categories (graphics, sound, control, and fun factor), summarizing, "While Jedi Knight: Dark Forces II doesn't add much more to the corridor-shooter mix, it does once again infuse the genre with familiar Star Wars characters and lots of laser-blastin' excitement. The bottom line is that Jedi Knight is probably the most fun you'll have with a corridor shooter this season."

The user control of the game was praised in GameSpot, and most critics were enthusiastic about the effectiveness of the lightsaber. Game Revolution's Calvin Hubble gushed, "The use of the lightsaber is just awesome. Not only is it the most powerful weapon, it can be used as a light source, to deflect blasts and to reveal secrets."

Tom Chick of IGN criticized the layout of the levels: "The levels can be awfully linear, throwing you up against some frustrating brick walls where you don't know where to go or what you're supposed to do next. There are some bald key hunts." The artificial intelligence of enemies received mixed reactions. GameSpot's Ron Dulin said that the AI is realistic, helping the suspension of disbelief. Chi Kong Lui of Gamecritics.com, however, gave the opposite view: "Enemy artificial intelligence is still pretty mindless and blasting them doesn't require much skill."

Some critics stated the game looks poor when played on computers without 3D acceleration. Hubble argued that the low detail is a necessary trade-off to maintain a high frame rate in the game's exceptionally wide-open levels, but noted that the difference a 3D card makes is high enough to strongly recommend its use. GamePro likewise held that the game should be commended for playing at a high speed even without 3D acceleration, while warning that "playing Jedi Knight without graphical enhancement is like watching Star Wars on a nine-inch black-and-white TV." Next Generation lauded not only the wide-open nature of the levels but their high level of functionality and organic feel. Dulin considered the character animations more detailed than similar games. The graphical presentation of the levels received specific praise from IGN: "No other first person shooter has come close to Jedi Knight's dizzying sense of scale and its vast levels." Several critics found the game's story interesting.

The use of John Williams' soundtrack from the Star Wars films was met with praise, though Lui believed that the music is overused in Star Wars video games. The sound effects were also lauded, and seen as providing a good atmosphere.

The addition of a multiplayer mode to Jedi Knight was met positively, though Dulin questioned why there are so few multiplayer maps and why single-player maps cannot be used in the multiplayer mode. Tom Chick of IGN believed this was corrected with the release of Mysteries of the Sith. Next Generation said that the "Healing" and "Force Pull" powers added great depth to the multiplayer action, elevating it above the formulaic techniques used in most games of the genre.

The editors of Computer Games Strategy Plus named Jedi Knight the best first-person action game of 1997. Jedi Knight won Computer Gaming World's 1997 "Game of the Year" award. The editors wrote, "As did Diablo the year before, Jedi rose above the crowd in appealing to gamers across all genres. The Force was definitely with LucasArts when they made Jedi Knight Dark Forces II." The magazine nominated Jedi Knight as the best action game of 1997, but it lost to Quake II.

The game was a finalist for "PC Action Game of the Year" and "Computer Entertainment Title of the Year" at the Academy of Interactive Arts & Sciences' inaugural Interactive Achievement Awards, but lost to Quake II and StarCraft, respectively.

In 1998, PC Gamer declared it the best computer game ever released, and the editors called it "such a class act from start to finish that even people who know nothing about PC games can tell they're looking at greatness. It's a fantastic game, and one we never hesitate to recommend to any kind of gamer".

In 1999, Next Generation listed Jedi Knight: Dark Forces II as number 28 on their "Top 50 Games of All Time", commenting that, "More than any other LucasArts game, Jedi Knight makes you feel like you are actually operating in the Star Wars universe."

In 2017, IGN ranked getting the lightsaber in Jedi Knight: Dark Forces II at the 92nd place of "Top 100 Unforgettable Video Game Moments".
