= The Force =

Fictional energy source in Star Wars

The Force is a metaphysical, mysterious, and ubiquitous power in the Star Wars fiction franchise. Within the galaxy in which the franchise is set, characters refer to the Force as an energy that interconnects all things, maintaining cosmic balance. Particularly "Force-sensitive" characters, usually through rigorous self-discipline, training, and mindfulness, are able to connect to the Force and thus access and wield certain supernatural abilities such as limited degrees of superhuman strength, telekinesis, and clairvoyance.

Heroes like the Jedi, a peacekeeping group of warrior-monks, largely seek to "become one with the Force", matching their personal wills with "the will of the Force". This is evidenced by their ability to channel its powers, which they do towards selfless and beneficial goals. Meanwhile, the Sith and other villains try to bend the additional abilities gained through the Force toward their own selfish and destructive desires. Throughout the franchise, this distinction is referred as the light side versus the dark side of the Force. In the conflict between the light and dark sides, characters' actions are often described as either helping to bring balance to the Force or, its opposite, causing a disturbance in the Force.

The Force and the Jedi religion have been compared to aspects of several real-world religions, such as Buddhism and Taoism. The Jedi catchphrase and valediction "May the Force be with you" has become part of pop culture vernacular.

== Concept and development ==
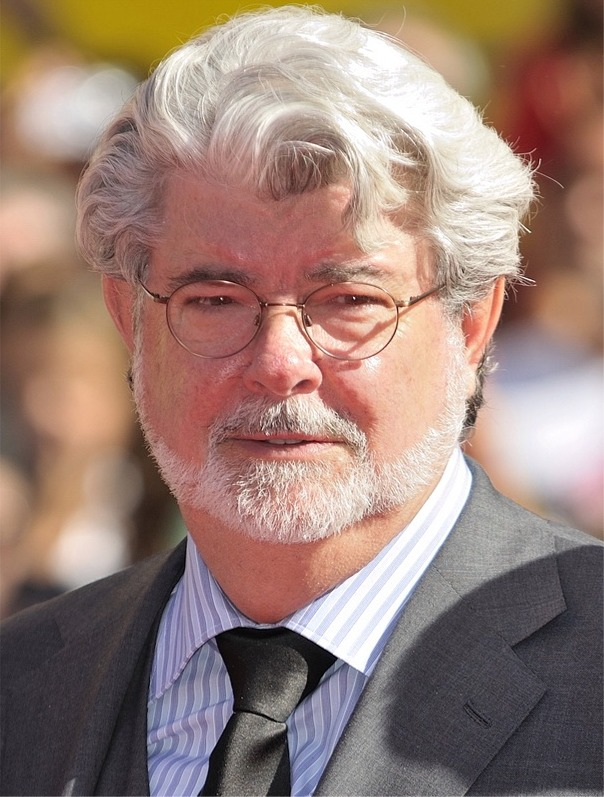
George Lucas created the concept of "the Force" both to advance the plot of Star Wars (1977) and to try to awaken a sense of spirituality in young audience members.

=== Creation for the original films ===
George Lucas created the concept of the Force to address character and plot developments in Star Wars (1977). He also wanted to "awaken a certain kind of spirituality" in young audiences, suggesting a belief in God without endorsing any specific religion. He developed the Force as a nondenominational religious concept, "distill[ed from] the essence of all religions", premised on the existence of God and distinct ideas of good and evil. Lucas said there is a conscious choice between good and bad, and "the world works better if you're on the good side". In 1970s San Francisco, where Lucas lived when he wrote the drafts that became Star Wars, New Age ideas that incorporated the concept of qi and other notions of a mystical life-force were "in the air" and widely embraced.

Lucas used the term the Force to "echo" its use by Canadian cinematographer Roman Kroitor in Arthur Lipsett's 21-87 (1963), a National Film Board production, in which Kroitor says, "Many people feel that in the contemplation of nature and in communication with other living things, they become aware of some kind of force, or something, behind this apparent mask which we see in front of us, and they call it God". Although Lucas had Kroitor's line in mind specifically, Lucas said the underlying sentiment is universal and that "similar phrases have been used extensively by many different people for the last 13,000 years".

The first draft of Star Wars makes two references to "the Force of Others" and does not explain the concept: King Kayos utters the blessing "May the Force of Others be with you all", and he later says "I feel the Force also". The power of the Force of Others is kept secret by the Jedi Bendu of the Ashla, an "aristocratic cult" in the second draft. The second draft offers a lengthy explanation of the Force of Others and introduces its Ashla light side and Bogan dark side. The Ashla and Bogan are mentioned 10 and 31 times, respectively, and the Force of Others plays a more prominent role in the story. In this draft, Luke Starkiller's mission is to retrieve the Kyber Crystal, which can intensify either the Ashla or Bogan powers. The film's shorter third draft has no references to the Ashla, but it mentions the Bogan eight times and Luke is still driven to recover the Kyber Crystal.

Lucas finished the fourth and near-final draft on January 1, 1976. This version trims "the Force of Others" to "the Force", makes a single reference to the Force's seductive "dark side", distills an explanation of the Force to 28 words, and eliminates the Kyber Crystal. Producer Gary Kurtz, who studied comparative religion in college, had long discussions with Lucas about religion and philosophy throughout the writing process. Kurtz told Lucas he was unhappy with drafts in which the Force was connected with the Kyber Crystal, and he was also dissatisfied with the early Ashla and Bogan concepts.

"The act of living generates a force field, an energy. That energy surrounds us; when we die, that energy joins with all the other energy. There is a giant mass of energy in the universe that has a good side and a bad side. We are part of the Force because we generate the power that makes the Force live. When we die, we become part of that Force, so we never really die; we continue as part of the Force."

— George Lucas during a production meeting for The Empire Strikes Back

Lucas and screenwriter Leigh Brackett decided that the Force and the Emperor would be the main concerns in The Empire Strikes Back (1980). The focus on the Emperor was later shifted to Return of the Jedi (1983), and the dark side of the Force was treated as The Empire Strikes Back's main villain.

=== Prequel films and midi-chlorians ===
The Phantom Menace (1999) introduces midi-chlorians (or midichlorians), microscopic creatures that connect characters to the Force. Lucas later requested a passage about midi-chlorians be retroactively added to notes written in August 1977 expanding on the nature of the Force. Lucas based the concept on symbiogenesis, calling midi-chlorians a "loose depiction" of mitochondria. He further said:

[Mitochondria] probably had something ... to do with the beginnings of life and how one cell decided to become two cells with a little help from this other little creature who came in, without whom life couldn't exist. And it's really a way of saying we have hundreds of little creatures who live on us, and without them, we all would die. There wouldn't be any life. They are necessary for us; we are necessary for them. Using them in the metaphor, saying society is the same way, says we all must get along with each other.

In a rough draft of Revenge of the Sith (2005), Palpatine says he "used the power of the Force to will the midichlorians to start the cell divisions that created Anakin Skywalker". This line was removed as the script progressed.

=== Sequel films and other productions ===
Lucas' story treatments for a potential sequel trilogy involved "a microbiotic world" and creatures known as the Whills, beings that "control the universe" and "feed off the Force." He elaborated that individuals function as "vehicles for the Whills to travel around in", and that midi-chlorians "communicate with the Whills [who] in a general sense ... are the Force." After selling Lucasfilm to Disney in 2012, Lucas said his biggest concern about the franchise's future was the Force being "muddled into a bunch of gobbledegook".

When writing The Force Awakens (2015) with Lawrence Kasdan, J. J. Abrams respected that Lucas had established midi-chlorians' effect on some characters' ability to use the Force. However, as a child, he interpreted Obi-Wan Kenobi's explanation of the Force in Star Wars to mean that any character could use its power, and that the Force was more grounded in spirituality than science. Abrams retained the idea of the Force having a light and a dark side, and some characters' seduction by the dark side helps create conflict for the story. Pablo Hidalgo of the Lucasfilm Story Group gave his "blessing" for writer-director Rian Johnson to introduce a new Force power in The Last Jedi (2017) "if the story required it and if it felt like it stretches into new territory but doesn't break the idea of what the Force can do." Johnson observed that every Star Wars movie introduces new Force powers to meet that film's story needs.

Star Wars Rebels producer Dave Filoni cites several influences on how the Force is used in the show. The character Bendu—named in homage to the term Lucas originally associated with the Jedi—does not align with the franchise's normal dark-or-light duality, and this role is an extension of Filoni's conversations with Lucas about the nature of the Force. Filoni credits the prequel films for better developing the concept of the Force, particularly the idea of a balance between the light and dark sides.

== Depiction ==
This concept art by Greg Knight of a stormtrooper being "Force pushed" was an early visualization of how the Force would be depicted in LucasArts' The Force Unleashed (2008).

Obi-Wan Kenobi describes the Force as "an energy field created by all living things" in Star Wars. In The Phantom Menace, Qui-Gon Jinn says microscopic lifeforms called midi-chlorians, which exist inside all living cells, allow some characters to be Force-sensitive; characters must have a high enough midi-chlorian count to feel and use the Force. Midi-chlorians are sentient, and arguably were the first species to emerge in the Star Wars universe. The species was a foundation of all life, as some deemed life impossible without midi-chlorians, and ultimately resided in all living beings, connecting two aspects of the Force. The Living Force (also known as a spirit or life essence) is the energy generated by all living things. Through midi-chlorians, it is fed into the Cosmic Force, which binds all things and communicates with living sentient beings.

In 1981, Lucas compared using the Force to yoga, saying any character can use its power. Dave Filoni said in 2015 that all Star Wars characters are "Force intuitive": some characters, like Luke Skywalker, are aware of their connection to the Force, while characters such as Han Solo draw upon the Force unconsciously. Filoni said the most potent Force users are characters whose midi-chlorian count provides a natural affinity for using the Force and who undertake intense training and discipline. Rogue One (2016) portrays the Force more as a religion "than simply a way to manipulate objects and people". In the years following the Great Jedi Purge depicted in the prequel trilogy, some characters have lost faith in the Force, and the Galactic Empire hunts down surviving Jedi and other Force-sensitive characters. By the time of the events in The Force Awakens, some characters think the Jedi and the Force are myths.

Some Force-sensitive characters derive special, psychic abilities from it, such as telekinesis, mind control, and extrasensory perception. The Force is sometimes referred to in terms of "dark" and "light" sides, with villains like the Sith drawing on the dark side to act aggressively while the Jedi use the light side for defense and peace. According to Filoni, Lucas believed a character's intentions when using the Force—their "will to be selfless or selfish"—is what distinguishes light and dark sides. The Force is also used by characters who are neither Jedi nor Sith, such as Leia Organa and Kylo Ren. Characters throughout the franchise use their Force powers in myriad ways, including Obi-Wan using a "mind trick" to undermine a stormtrooper's will, Darth Vader choking subordinates without touching them, Palpatine torturing Luke Skywalker with his Force Lightning, Qui-Gon Jinn repelling several battle droids at once, Rey lifting a large pile of rocks, and Kylo Ren stopping blaster fire in mid-air. Film and television use of the Force is sometimes accompanied by a sound effect, such as a deep rumble associated with aggressive use or a more high-pitched sound associated with benevolent use.

From left: Anakin Skywalker (Sebastian Shaw), Yoda (Frank Oz), and Obi-Wan Kenobi (Alec Guinness) appear as spirits at the end of the original version of Return of the Jedi.

Jedi with special training can continue to exist after death, and some interact with the living as "being[s] of light" referred to as "Force ghosts." Obi-Wan's spirit provides Luke with guidance at key moments in the original trilogy, and Yoda appears as a spirit to guide Luke in The Last Jedi. Voices of past Jedi help Rey at the climax of The Rise of Skywalker, and Luke's and Leia's spirits watch over her at the film's conclusion. In an early draft of Return of the Jedi, Lucas planned to resurrect Obi-Wan and Yoda at the climax, and some drafts included scenes of the two helping Luke stop the Emperor. The final arc of sixth season of The Clone Wars reveals that Qui-Gon Jinn learned how to transition into the "cosmic Force" from entities who represent various emotions; Yoda hears the deceased Qui-Gon's voice in Attack of the Clones (2002), and he reveals in Revenge of the Sith that he has contact with Qui-Gon. A short story by Claudia Gray depicts Obi-Wan learning this technique from Qui-Gon in the years leading up to Star Wars.

The Force plays an important role in several Star Wars plot lines. Anakin Skywalker's rise as a Jedi, descent into the Sith Lord Darth Vader, and redemption back to the light side of the Force is the main story arc for the first six Star Wars films. Yoda's arc in the sixth season of The Clone Wars depicts him exploring "bigger questions" about the Force and taking various inspirations from the franchise's expanded universe. In The Force Awakens, Finn's exposure to the Force helps make him question his training. Writer Rian Johnson used the Force to allow Rey and Kylo Ren to communicate in The Last Jedi, developing the characters' relationship.

== Analysis ==
Chris Taylor called the Force "largely a mystery" in Star Wars. Taylor ascribes the "more poetic, more spiritual ... and more demonstrative" descriptions of the Force in The Empire Strikes Back to Lawrence Kasdan, who co-wrote the film, but says the film does little to expand audiences' understanding of it. In 1997, Lucas said that the more detail he articulated about the Force and how it works, the more it took away from its core meaning. Kotaku suggests Rian Johnson depicted more nuance in the Force in The Last Jedi than Lucas did in his films. According to Rob Weinert-Kendt, the "Force theme" in John Williams' score represents the power and responsibility of wielding the Force.

=== Comparison to magic ===
Paranormal abilities like the Force are a common device in science fiction, and the Force has been compared to the role magic plays in the fantasy genre. The Star Wars films illustrate that characters not familiar with the particulars of the Force associate it with mysticism and magic, such as when an Imperial officer alludes to the "sorcerer's ways" of Darth Vader. The depiction of the Force in Star Wars has been compared to that of magic in Harry Potter, with the former being described as more of a "spiritual force". According to The A.V. Club, The Last Jedi depicts the Force "closer to the sorcery of fairy tales and medieval romance than it's ever been."

Eric Charles points out that the television films The Ewok Adventure (1984) and Ewoks: The Battle for Endor (1985), intended for children, are "fairy tales in a science fiction setting" which feature magic and other fairy tale motifs rather than the Force and science-fiction tropes. These Ewok films have been described as depicting "sorcery" that is distinct from the Force powers depicted in the first six Star Wars films. Drawing from the Star Wars roleplaying game sourcebook he co-authored in 1987, Bill Slavicsek says that "The Ewoks' mystical beliefs contain many references to the Force, though it is never named as such."

=== Religion and spirituality ===
In his 1977 review of Star Wars, Vincent Canby of The New York Times called the Force "a mixture of what appears to be ESP and early Christian faith." It has been studied in a religious context from an academic perspective. The Magic of Myth compares the sharp distinction between the good "light side" and evil "dark side" of the Force to Zoroastrianism, which posits that "good and evil, like light and darkness, are contrary realities". The connectedness between the light and dark sides has been compared to the relationship between yin and yang in Taoism, although the balance between yin and yang lacks the element of evil associated with the dark side. Taylor identifies other similarities between the Force and a Navajo prayer, prana, and qi. It is a common plot device in jidaigeki films like The Hidden Fortress (1958), which inspired Star Wars, for samurai who master qi to achieve astonishing feats of swordsmanship. Taylor added that the lack of detail about the Force makes it "a religion for the secular age". According to Jennifer Porter, professor of religious studies at the Memorial University of Newfoundland, "the Force is a metaphor for godhood that resonates and inspires within [people] a deeper commitment to the godhood identified within their traditional faith". According to Christian Pastor Clayton Keenan, "the spirituality of 'Star Wars' has to do with the Force. It's depicted as ... something supernatural within this universe, but it's not the same thing as a personal god that Christians or Jews or Muslims might believe in. It's this impersonal force that is in some ways this neutral, impersonal energy that is out there to be used for good or for evil."

At one point, Francis Ford Coppola suggested to George Lucas that they use their combined fortunes to start a religion based on the Force. Practitioners of Jediism pray to and express gratitude to the Force.

=== Scientific analysis ===
Scientists are mostly skeptical about a "real world" explanation for the Force. Astrophysicist Jeanne Cavelos says in The Science of Star Wars that explaining the Force is particularly difficult because "it does so many different things". Force powers like precognition imply the time travel of information. Cavelos explores the possibility of brain implants or sensors being used to detect users' intent and manipulate energy fields, and compares such discipline to contemporary patients learning to control prosthetics.

A scientific explanation of the Force would require new discoveries in physics, such as unknown fields or particles or a fifth force beyond the four fundamental interactions. Flavio Fenton of the Georgia Institute of Technology School of Physics suggests a fifth force would carry two types of charge—one for the light side and one for the dark—and that each would be carried by its own particle. Nepomuk Otte, also from Georgia Tech, cautions that Newton's third law of motion says telekinesis would apply a force back on the Force-wielding character. Fabien Paillusson from the University of Lincoln argues that the Force of the Star Wars universe reflects our own quest for understanding the forces of the world we live in.

== Cultural impact ==
A Feynman diagram of one way the Higgs boson might be produced. National Geographic compared it to the Jedi in Star Wars.

National Geographic magazine compared the Higgs boson's role as "carrier" of the Higgs field to the way the Jedi are "carriers" of the Force. A previsualization video highlighting the idea of "kicking someone's ass with the Force" steered LucasArts game designers toward producing The Force Unleashed (2008), which sold six million copies as of July 2009. In 2009, Uncle Milton Industries released a toy, called the Force Trainer, which uses EEG to read users' beta waves to lift a training droid-themed ball with a shaft of air.

The New Republic, Townhall, The Atlantic, and others have compared various political machinations to the "Jedi mind trick", a Force power used to undermine opponents' perceptions and willpower.

=== Critical response ===
Critic Tim Robley compared the Force to the ruby slippers from The Wizard of Oz (1939), with both being entities that send the protagonist on a quest. In her 1980 Washington Post review of The Empire Strikes Back, Judith Martin described the Force as "a mishmash of current cultic fashions without any base in ideas. It doesn't seem to be connected with ethics or a code of decent behavior, either." John Simon wrote in his 1977 review of Star Wars for New York magazine:

And then there is that distressing thing called the Force, which is ... Lucas's tribute to something beyond science: imagination, the soul, God in man ... It appears in various contradictory and finally nonsensical guises, a facile and perfunctory bow to metaphysics. I wish that Lucas had had the courage of his materialistic convictions, instead dragging in a sop to a spiritual force the main thrust of the movie so cheerfully ignores.

The introduction of midichlorians in The Phantom Menace was controversial, with Evan Narcisse of Time writing that the concept ruined Star Wars for him and a generation of fans because "the mechanisms of the Force became less spiritual and more scientific". Film historian Daniel Dinello called midi-chlorians "anathema to Star Wars fanatics who thought they reduced the Force to a kind of viral infection." Referring to "midi-chlorians" became a screenwriting shorthand for over-explaining a concept. Although Chris Taylor suggested fans want less detail, not more, in explaining the Force, Chris Bell argues that the introduction of midi-chlorians provided depth to the franchise and fomented engagement among fans and franchise writers. Religion expert John D. Caputo writes, "In the 'Gospel according to Lucas' a world is conjured up in which the intractable oppositions that have tormented religious thinkers for centuries are reconciled ... The gifts that the Jedi masters enjoy have a perfectly plausible scientific basis, even if its ways are mysterious".

Characters' faith in the Force reinforces Rogue One's message of hope. The A.V. Club said Rian Johnson's depiction of the Force in The Last Jedi goes "beyond George Lucas' original transcendental concept". Polygon said Johnson's film "democratize[s] the Force", depicting Force sensitivity in characters from outside a "Force-sensitive lineage" and suggesting that the Force can be used by anyone.

=== "May the Force be with you" ===
Several Star Wars characters say "May the Force be with you" (or derivatives of it) and the expression has become a popular catchphrase. In 2005, "May the Force be with you" was chosen as number 8 on the American Film Institute's 100 Years... 100 Movie Quotes list. May 4 is Star Wars Day, taken from the pun "May the Fourth be with you". The expression was intentionally similar to the Christian dominus vobiscum, "the Lord be with you".

President Ronald Reagan in 1985 said "the Force is with us", referring to the United States, to create the Strategic Defense Initiative (itself often nicknamed Star Wars) to protect against Soviet ballistic missiles. Some weeks earlier, Reagan had compared the Soviet Union to the Galactic Empire. The Gospel According to Star Wars says that Reagan's invocation of the Force was actually perverting Star Wars' "self-dispossessing" (or other-focused) ethos:

[The] blessing "May the Force be with you" is the expression of a hope for others ("May the Force be with you"), not for ourselves as with Reagan ("The Force is with us"). Moreover, the [Star Wars] blessing is precisely a request for hope for others ("May the Force be with you"), whereas Reagan's claim sounds like a possessive assertion ("The Force is with us").

== See also ==
- Anima mundi
- Animism
- Bene Gesserit
- Brahman
- Force field (physics)
- Jediism
- Manitou
- Mysticism
- Mythopoeia
- Ontology
- Orenda
- Prana
- Psychic
- Qi
- Pneuma
- Sith
