= Sabine Wren =

Character in the Star Wars franchise

- Star Wars character
- Sabine as seen in Rebels.
- First appearance: "The Machine in the Ghost"; Rebels; (2014)
- Created by: Dave Filoni; Simon Kinberg; Carrie Beck
- Voiced by: Tiya Sircar
- Portrayed by: Natasha Liu Bordizzo

In-universe information
- Full name: Sabine Wren
- Alias: Spectre 5
- Gender: Female
- Title: The Mandalorian
- Affiliation: New Republic; Rebel Alliance Ghost crew: Kanan Jarrus; Hera Syndulla; Zeb Orrelios; Ezra Bridger; Chopper; Captain Rex
- Weapon: Lightsaber: The Darksaber; Preceded by: Maul; Succeeded by: Bo-Katan Kryze
- Family: Alrich Wren (father - died); Ursa Wren (mother - died); Tristan Wren (brother - died)
- Nationality: Mandalorian
- Master: Ahsoka Tano
- Homeworld: Krownest; Mandalore

Sabine Wren is a fictional character in the Star Wars franchise, voiced by Tiya Sircar in the animated series Star Wars Rebels (2014–2018) and Forces of Destiny (2017–2018), and portrayed by Natasha Liu Bordizzo in the live-action miniseries Ahsoka (2023-2027).

In Star Wars Rebels, Sabine is introduced as a Mandalorian graffiti artist and bounty hunter who left the Empire for the Rebel Alliance after a weapon she developed for them was used against her people. As a rebel, she joins the crew of the Ghost, recruiting Wedge Antilles to their cause, and on stealing the Darksaber from Maul, is trained in lightsaber combat by Kanan Jarrus, in spite of an inability to use the Force. She eventually gives the Darksaber to Bo-Katan Kryze, and moves to Lothal after Ezra Bridger sacrifices himself to banish himself and Grand Admiral Thrawn to another galaxy. Between the events of Rebels and Ahsoka, Sabine becomes the Jedi Padawan of Ahsoka Tano offscreen, studying Jedi practices in a failed attempt to learn how to wield the Force herself, before leaving Ahsoka after her family is killed during the genocidal Purge of Mandalore, a conflict Ahsoka had prevented Sabine from participating in. In Ahsoka, Sabine reunites with Ahsoka to investigate rumors of Thrawn's and Ezra's survival. After Ahsoka is apparently killed by former Jedi Baylan Skoll, Sabine joins him in tracking down Thrawn and Ezra, ensuring both return to the galaxy, while Sabine herself, a still-alive Ahsoka, Baylan, and his own apprentice Shin Hati are all left stranded in the other galaxy.

The character has received a generally positive critical reception, for both Sircar's vocal performance and Liu Bordizzo's physical portrayal.

== Creation and development ==
The character of Sabine Wren was first created in 2014 for the animated television show Star Wars Rebels.

Tiya Sircar, the animated series' voice of Wren, indicated she would like to portray the character in an upcoming live-action project. However, Natasha Liu Bordizzo was chosen to play the part.

Wren's birthdate is given as 21 BBY (Before the Battle of Yavin), near the end of the Clone Wars. She was born and partially raised on Mandalore. Her family's clan, Clan Wren, had an ancestral home on Krownest, which is what she considered to be her home world. Her father Alrich Wren was an artist. Her mother Ursa Wren was a Countess, and the leader of Clan Wren.

== Appearances ==
=== Star Wars Rebels (2014–2018) ===
Sabine debuts as a 16-year-old Mandalorian graffiti artist, Imperial Academy dropout and a former bounty hunter with expert knowledge of weapons and explosives. As a member of the Ghost crew (reporting under call sign Spectre 5), she acts as their chief engineer and cargo transport, weapons and demolitions expert, as well as their linguist, being fluent in a wide variety of languages. Originally a dedicated student and fledgling inventor for the Empire, she deserted when one of the weapons she had created was planned to be used against her own people.

In "The Protector of Concord Dawn", Sabine is revealed to come from House Vizsla, thus leading to her relation with Death Watch, a Mandalorian terrorist group in The Clone Wars. The episode "The Antilles Extraction" reveals she was the one who helped pilot Wedge Antilles defect from the Empire and join the Rebellion. The episode "Imperial Supercommandos" reveals her mother, Ursa Wren, is sided with the Empire. In "Visions and Voices", Sabine acquires the Darksaber, a weapon used by Death Watch and also by Darth Maul during the Clone Wars. In "Trials of the Darksaber", Sabine's past is fully revealed, and Kanan trains Sabine in lightsaber combat (at the time, Sabine could not use The Force). By the next episode, Sabine decides to stay with her family in order to help unite the clans against the Empire. Sabine returns to the group in "Zero Hour" when Grand Admiral Thrawn leads his forces to attack Atollon. Wren would eventually turn the Darksaber over to Bo-Katan Kryze.

In the series finale epilogue, it is revealed that Sabine stayed on Lothal, living in Ezra Bridger's tower. Earlier in the episode, Ezra told her that "I can always count on you", which she took to mean that he needed her to stay on Lothal and protect his people; however, in the epilogue, she understands what Ezra really meant and joins Ahsoka Tano in finding him and bringing him home.

=== Ahsoka (2023-2027) ===
In November 2021, Deadline Hollywood announced that Natasha Liu Bordizzo was to be cast as Sabine in the upcoming live-action series Ahsoka.

After the fall of the Empire, Sabine was briefly trained in the Jedi arts by Ahsoka Tano, though their relationship quickly disintegrated over the destruction of Mandalore by Moff Gideon, in which the rest of her family was killed. Ahsoka stopped Sabine's Jedi training because she felt she wasn't ready. Following rumors of the survival of Grand Admiral Thrawn (and by possible extension, Ezra Bridger), Ahsoka returns to seek Sabine's help in decoding a map taken from a Nightsister temple. Sabine is later stabbed by Dark Side user Shin Hati, but after her recovery, Hera Syndulla encourages Ahsoka and Sabine to reconcile and resume the latter's training. During the course of this training, Huyang states that even among generations of Jedi, Sabine falls short in terms of Force sensitivity, and she initially doesn't exhibit any capacity beyond what a non-Force user is capable of (i.e. a minimal degree like all living beings).

Sabine and Ahsoka end up on the planet Seatos, where Morgan Elsbeth has assembled a massive hyperspace ring to reach Grand Admiral Thrawn, who was taken by Purrgil to another galaxy. Ahsoka intends to entirely stop this journey from ever occurring, though Sabine desires to save Ezra, who was taken under the same circumstances as Thrawn. Sabine again duels with Shin. After Shin's master Baylan Skoll seemingly kills Ahsoka, he is able to convince her to join them, promising that she will be reunited with Ezra. Sabine is taken aboard the hyperspace ring, and they travel to the distant galaxy.

Once arriving at Peridea, their target location and the ancient birthplace of the Dathomiri, Sabine encounters Thrawn. Thrawn releases her according to her bargain with Skoll, only to send Skoll and his apprentice Shin Hati after her to kill both Sabine and Ezra. Sabine finds Ezra in the company of a tribe of Noti, nomadic natives, to be then attacked by the two Dark Jedi and Thrawn's forces. Ahsoka and Huyang arrive to relieve them, and afterwards they hurry to the landing site of Thrawn's Star Destroyer Chimaera to stop his departure from Peridea. Held up by Elsbeth and Thrawn's troopers, Sabine manifests her latent Force ability to help Ezra board the Chimaera just before it takes off, leaving her, Ahsoka and Huyang stranded.

=== Other appearances ===
Sabine also stars in the animated micro-series Star Wars Forces of Destiny.

== Wren Phoenix crest ==
The Rebel Alliance insignia seen throughout Star Wars movies and series was explained to be partially based on artwork that Wren created for her own use. The starbird, or phoenix, legend was known to many as an immortal creature who renewed itself within the heart of a nova. Wren made a rounded representation that she used on her armor as a personal artistic symbol of freedom, as well as defacing Imperial propaganda with it, and placing it wherever her group went. Eventually, X-wing pilots and others in the Rebel Alliance adopted a form of it as a logo representing the hope of the future restoration of the Republic.

== Reception ==
CG supervisor of lighting and FX Joel Aron said, "She's adding something that we haven't really seen before in the Star Wars universe. You have a character that is expressively creative through art—whether it's the color of her hair or what she's done to her armor." Her last image in the series finale is with deep purple hair cut short.

== Relationships ==
Jedi Order master-apprentice relationship

Yoda
Count; Dooku	Mace; Windu
Qui-Gon; Jinn	Depa; Billaba
Younglings
Obi-Wan; Kenobi	Kanan; Jarrus
Anakin; Skywalker	Luke; Skywalker	Ezra; Bridger
Ahsoka; Tano	Leia; Organa
Sabine Wren	Ben Solo (Note: Ben Solo and Rey are a Force dyad.)	Rey
Din Grogu
