= Kanan Jarrus =

Character in Star Wars

Kanan Jarrus Caleb Dume
- Star Wars character
- Kanan as depicted in the first two seasons of Star Wars Rebels
- First appearance: "The Machine in the Ghost"; Rebels; (2014)
- Last appearance: "Practice Makes Perfect"; Tales of the Jedi; (2022)
- Created by: Dave Filoni
- Voiced by: Freddie Prinze Jr. (Rebels, Episode IX, The Clone Wars and The Bad Batch); Michael Benyaer (Droid Tales)

In-universe information
- Full name: Caleb Dume
- Species: Human
- Gender: Male
- Occupation: Jedi Knight; De facto leader of the Ghost crew
- Affiliation: Jedi Order; Galactic Republic; Rebel Alliance; Ghost crew: Hera Syndulla; Sabine Wren; Zeb Orrelios; Ezra Bridger; Chopper; Captain Rex
- Significant other: Hera Syndulla
- Children: Jacen Syndulla
- Master: Depa Billaba
- Apprentice: Ezra Bridger
- Homeworld: Coruscant

Kanan Jarrus (born Caleb Dume) is a character in the Star Wars franchise, voiced by Freddie Prinze Jr. He is featured as one of the main characters of the animated series Star Wars Rebels (2014–2018) and related works. His Force spirit also appears as a disembodied voice in the film The Rise of Skywalker (2019), while a young Caleb Dume makes appearances in the seventh season of The Clone Wars (2020), The Bad Batch (2021), and Tales of the Jedi (2022).

In the Star Wars universe, Caleb Dume is a Jedi Padawan who survived the Great Jedi Purge after his master, Depa Billaba, sacrificed herself to save him. Changing his name to Kanan Jarrus to avoid detection by the Galactic Empire, he becomes a fugitive and meets Rebel cell leader Hera Syndulla, the captain of the Ghost. The two gradually develop a romantic relationship, and Kanan joins Hera on the Ghost as one of the crew's de facto leaders. Although he initially keeps his Force abilities hidden from his comrades, Kanan re-embraces his Jedi role after meeting Ezra Bridger, whom he begins mentoring in the Jedi arts, and eventually completes his own training to become a Jedi Knight. Kanan and his crew later join the wider Rebel Alliance to aid them in the fight against the Empire, during which Kanan ultimately sacrifices himself to save his friends. Prior to his death, Kanan unknowingly conceived a son with Hera, Jacen Syndulla.

== Creation and development ==
=== Concept ===
Executive producer Dave Filoni describes the character as a "cowboy Jedi". Animation supervisor Keith Kellogg said: "He is a Jedi but he's not a Jedi in the traditional sense that we've had before on the show. He's a little more rough around the edges. He's kept his lightsaber locked away, so he hasn't used it in a long time." After being blinded, Kanan has been compared to the Star Wars Legends character Rahm Kota from Star Wars: The Force Unleashed, another blinded Jedi, which led Pablo Hidalgo from the Lucasfilm story group to say on Twitter that both characters were inspired by Zatoichi. Filoni compared Kanan to Gandalf from The Lord of the Rings. The character's name was inspired by Kanan Dume Road in Malibu, California.

Prior to auditioning, Prinze was unaware that he was about to audition for a Star Wars series; he only learned of this immediately beforehand in the studio parking lot, when an unknown "legendary voice actor" informed him what he was actually auditioning for. Although Disney originally did not want Prinze in the role, Filoni disagreed. Prinze was officially hired later that day.

During the development of the second season, the character was originally slated to be killed by Maul in the episode "Twilight of the Apprentice." However, Disney objected to the idea, as they thought that the character should be in "every episode" of the series. In regards to the character's eventual death in the episode "Jedi Night" of the fourth season of Star Wars Rebels, Filoni felt this was a natural end to Kanan promising he will see Hera again before being blinded and said: "In that moment he's not bound as this material thing that the physicality of sight would be a limitation to him." While sketching storyboards for Kanan's death, Filoni became reluctant to kill the character, but Prinze, who "was resolute about the fact that his character needed to die" since the beginning of the series, encouraged him to write the scene.

=== Voice acting ===
Kanan is voiced by Freddie Prinze Jr. in Star Wars Rebels, Star Wars: Episode IX – The Rise of Skywalker, and the episode "Aftermath" of Star Wars: The Bad Batch. He is also voiced by Michael Benyaer in the micro-series Lego Star Wars: Droid Tales.

== Appearances ==
=== Television ===
==== Rebels ====
Kanan first appears in a short film released prior to the series, "The Machine in the Ghost", and his voice is heard in another one, "Entanglement". In the two-part series premiere "Spark of Rebellion", Kanan is introduced as the de facto leader of the crew of the Ghost, a Rebel starship. Although he never finished his own Jedi training, Kanan sees great potential in young Ezra Bridger of Lothal, and decides to train him as his own Padawan. In the season one finale "Fire Across the Galaxy", Kanan, who was captured by the Empire, is rescued by Ezra. Kanan then fights and defeats the Grand Inquisitor, before he and the rest of the Ghost crew are invited into the Rebel Alliance, now that the Empire has become aware of the threat they represent.

In "The Siege of Lothal", the two-part premiere of season two, Kanan survives an encounter with Darth Vader, while in "The Lost Commanders", he initially finds it difficult to trust the clone trooper Captain Rex, because clones had murdered his master, Depa Billaba, as well as most other Jedi, in obedience to Order 66. In "Shroud of Darkness", Kanan is promoted to the rank of Jedi Knight following a series of adventures in the Jedi Temple on Lothal. In "Twilight of the Apprentice", the two-part finale of season two, Kanan travels with Ezra, Ahsoka Tano, and the astromech droid Chopper to the Sith world of Malachor in hopes of finding the knowledge they need to defeat the Sith. There, they encounter the former Sith Lord Maul, posing as a frail hermit, who has been left stranded on the planet for years. Though seemingly friendly at first, as he helps the three Jedi defeat a trio of Imperial Inquisitors, Maul ultimately betrays them and escapes after blinding Kanan with his lightsaber.

In the third season, a Force-sensitive creature called the Bendu mentors Kanan in the ways of Force-sight. Kanan still participates in Rebel missions, with his mastery of the Force compensating for his blindness, but he takes a less active role in leadership. In the two-part episode "Ghosts of Geonosis", Kanan meets Saw Gerrera, the leader of an independent Rebel group, much like the Ghost crew prior to joining the Rebel Alliance. In "Trials of the Darksaber", Kanan trains Sabine Wren in lightsaber combat. The fourth season portrays Kanan and Hera as being in a relationship, and at some point they conceive a child together. However, Kanan sacrifices his life in the episode "Jedi Night" while rescuing Hera from Imperial captivity to trick enemy forces into shooting fuel reserves for the TIE defender fleet they were standing on, using the Force to get the rest of the Spectres to safety and regaining his sight as the fuel was exploding. The destruction of the fuel thwarts Grand Admiral Thrawn's plan to mass-produce the TIE defenders and easily decimate Rebel fleets, eventually leading to his downfall.

Despite his death, Kanan makes minor appearances in most of the remaining episodes. In "Wolves and A Door", while passing through the hyper tunnel on Loth-wolves, the remaining Spectres see several illusions of Kanan and hear his voice, like many others, such as the Grand Inquisitor, Hera, Ezra, Ahsoka and Zeb Orrelios. He appears later on in the same episode in Hera's imagination. She imagines him as a Force ghost comforting her. In the following episode, "A World Between Worlds", Kanan's voice is heard in the World Between Worlds by both Ezra and Ahsoka multiple times, until he finally appears through a portal. Ezra makes up his mind to save him and goes to the portal that depicts Kanan's final moments. Ahsoka stops Ezra from saving Kanan, telling him that he intended to sacrifice himself and interfering with it would allow the fuel explosion he caused to kill Ezra and most of the Spectres via the grandfather paradox. Though reluctant to do so, Ezra allows Kanan to go on with his sacrifice. The ending of the series finale "Family Reunion – and Farewell", set after the Battle of Endor, shows both Kanan and Hera's young son Jacen Syndulla, and a mural on Lothal painted by Sabine, which depicts the Ghost crew, including Kanan.

==== Droid Tales ====
Kanan appears in the Lego Star Wars: Droid Tales episode "Mission to Mos Eisley", which adapts his role in the Rebels episode "Droids in Distress".

==== Forces of Destiny ====
Kanan is mentioned by Ezra in the Forces of Destiny episode "A Disarming Lesson".

==== The Clone Wars ====
A young Caleb Dume makes a cameo appearance in the episode "Old Friends Not Forgotten" of the final season of The Clone Wars, in which he is shown as a hologram alongside his master, Depa Billaba, during a meeting with other Jedi.

==== The Bad Batch ====
Caleb appears alongside Depa Billaba in the premiere episode of The Bad Batch, "Aftermath", with Freddie Prinze Jr. reprising his role. While on a mission with the Bad Batch on Kaller, Order 66 is activated and Caleb witnesses clone troopers killing Billaba, who tells him to run. He defends himself from Bad Batch member Crosshair before Hunter, the leader of the Bad Batch, lets Caleb escape.

==== Tales of the Jedi ====
Caleb makes a non-speaking cameo appearance alongside Depa Billaba in the episode "Practice Makes Perfect" of Tales of the Jedi. They are seen watching Ahsoka's training in the Jedi Temple and later walking past Anakin and Ahsoka.

==== Ahsoka ====
In the fourth episode of Ahsoka, a glimpse of a live-action photograph of Kanan (made to resemble Freddie Prinze Jr.) is visible when Hera rushes to help Ahsoka.

=== Film ===
==== The Rise of Skywalker ====
Kanan's voice is heard in The Rise of Skywalker as one of the Jedi spirits who encourage Rey to defeat Darth Sidious. He tells Rey that "In the heart of a Jedi lies her strength."

=== Novels ===
On September 2, 2014, Del Rey Books published Star Wars: A New Dawn, a prequel novel telling the story of how Kanan and Hera met.

=== Comics ===
The comic book Kanan ran for 12 issues from 2015 to 2016, and was published by Marvel Comics. The series is set during the events of Star Wars Rebels' first season and focuses on Kanan having flashbacks to his time as a Jedi Padawan (when he was known as Caleb Dume). Two story arcs were produced, each running for six issues. The first arc, The Last Padawan, focuses on flashbacks which occur around the same time as Star Wars: Episode III – Revenge of the Sith, showing where Kanan was during Order 66. The events surrounding Order 66 as depicted in the comic were later retconned in The Bad Batch. The flashbacks of the second arc, First Blood, show Kanan being assigned under Depa Billaba's mentorship, as well as his first battle alongside clone troopers during the Clone Wars. It features an appearance by Rae Sloane, a character from the novel Star Wars: A New Dawn, as well as Fenn Rau, a Mandalorian character who would later appear in Rebels.

=== Video games ===
Kanan has appeared in a number of Star Wars video games, which depict him with either his design from the first two seasons of Rebels, or his appearance from the final two seasons, after he was blinded by Maul. The former design is used in Star Wars Rebels: Recon Missions, a side-scrolling, run-and-gun platform game released for iOS, Android and the Windows Store. Kanan also appears as a playable character in Disney Infinity 3.0 and Lego Star Wars: The Force Awakens (via downloadable content), while a bird version of the character, represented by Chuck, is featured in Angry Birds Star Wars II.

Kanan, based on his blinded appearance, is a playable character in the mobile turn-based role-playing game Star Wars: Galaxy of Heroes; he was added in a Rebels-themed update during the game's second year of operation. He also appears in the real-time strategy game Star Wars: Force Arena as a summonable unique assistant for any Light Side squad led by Ezra Bridger. In Lego Star Wars: The Skywalker Saga, Kanan is included as a playable character via the Rebels downloadable pack.

== Relationships ==
Jedi Order master-apprentice relationship

Yoda
Count; Dooku | Mace; Windu
Qui-Gon; Jinn | Depa; Billaba
Younglings
Obi-Wan; Kenobi | Kanan; Jarrus
Anakin; Skywalker | Luke; Skywalker | Ezra; Bridger
Ahsoka; Tano | Leia; Organa
Sabine Wren | Ben Solo (Note: Ben Solo and Rey are a Force dyad.) | Rey
Din Grogu
