= Ezra Bridger =

Fictional character from the Star Wars universe

- Star Wars character
- Ezra as depicted in the last two seasons of Star Wars Rebels
- First appearance: "Property of Ezra Bridger"; Rebels; (2014)
- Created by: Dave Filoni
- Voiced by: Taylor Gray (Rebels, Forces of Destiny); Adrian Petriw (Droid Tales)
- Portrayed by: Eman Esfandi (Ahsoka)

In-universe information
- Full name: Ezra Bridger
- Aliases: Jabba the Hutt; Dev Morgan; Lando Calrissian; Brom Titus
- Species: Human
- Gender: Male
- Occupation: Jedi Padawan
- Affiliation: Jedi Order; Rebel Alliance; Ghost crew; Gold Squadron (briefly)
- Family: Ephraim Bridger (father); Mira Bridger (mother)
- Masters: Kanan Jarrus; Maul (claimant)
- Homeworld: Lothal

Ezra Bridger is a character in the Star Wars franchise. He first appeared as the central protagonist of the animated series Star Wars Rebels (2014–2018), in which he was voiced by Taylor Gray. Ezra also appears in Forces of Destiny (2018), with Gray reprising his role. The character made his live-action debut in the television series Ahsoka (2023), portrayed by Eman Esfandi.

In Rebels, Ezra is introduced as a 14-year-old orphaned street urchin and con artist who joins the crew of the Ghost in freeing his home planet of Lothal from the tyranny of the Galactic Empire. He is taken under the wing of Kanan Jarrus, who trains him in the Jedi arts, and later the former Sith Maul, who teaches him to additionally wield the dark side of the Force. Ezra and the Ghost crew eventually join the Rebel Alliance to aid in the galaxy-wide conflict against the Empire, facing enemies such as the Inquisitors, Darth Vader, and Grand Admiral Thrawn—the latter of whom Ezra sacrifices himself to defeat, disappearing with him into another galaxy. In Ahsoka, years after the fall of the Empire, Sabine Wren travels to the other galaxy to rescue Ezra; while Ezra returns to the galaxy with Thrawn, Sabine and Ahsoka Tano are left stranded in his place.

The character has received a generally positive critical reception, with his character dynamics with Hondo Ohnaka and Thrawn receiving particular praise.

== Creation and development ==
=== Concept ===
Executive producer Dave Filoni described the character as a "con artist". Creative executive Rayne Roberts said: "[Ezra] doesn't really trust anyone; that [is] his motto. He has that kind of hard edge at times but knows how to turn on the charm when it comes to getting what he wants and [is] very charismatic — [one] would want to be his friend." The episode "Empire Day" reveals that Ezra was born on the same day the Galactic Empire was inaugurated, and that he has been living on his own since he was seven, after his parents, Ephraim and Mira Bridger, were arrested for speaking out against the Empire. According to Taylor Gray, Ezra lives alone in the streets of Lothal, relying on his "street smarts" – as well as subconscious Force abilities – to survive.

=== Voice acting ===
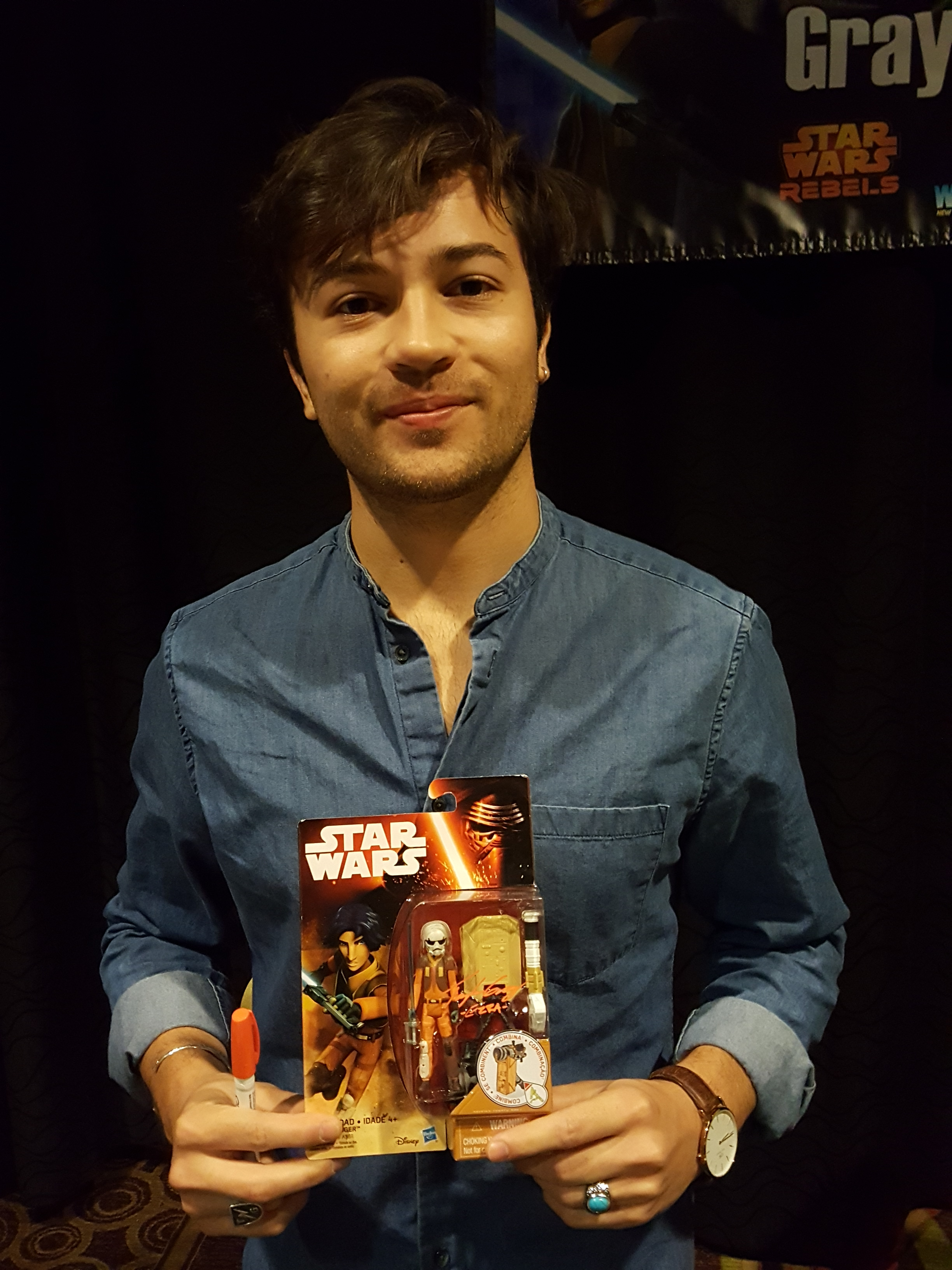
Taylor Gray, Ezra's voice actor, with an action figure of the character

Ezra is voiced by actor Taylor Gray. On his character, Gray stated: "He's a pickpocket, he's a little thief. But he's doing it all because he needs to survive." Executive producer Greg Weisman said: "We see this whole series very much through Ezra's eyes. As his eyes get opened to what the Empire's capable of, his eyes are opened to the fact that there are people who care, who are trying to fight the good fight, and he becomes one of them."

== Appearances ==
=== Television ===
==== Rebels ====
Ezra made his debut appearance on television in the short film "Property of Ezra Bridger", set before the two-part series premiere "Spark of Rebellion". Ezra first encounters the crew of the starship Ghost when he interferes in their hijacking operation by stealing their targeted shipment. Kanan Jarrus, a Jedi and the leader of the group, discovers Ezra's Force-sensitivity and, seeing potential in Ezra, offers to train him in the ways of the Force. Ezra soon joins the Ghost crew and begins his Jedi training.

In "Path of the Jedi", Yoda's voice leads Ezra to a kyber crystal, which he uses to build his first lightsaber. The saber features a blue blade and a built-in stun blaster patterned after Ezra's trademark weapon as a street urchin, an energy slingshot. In the second-season episode "Legacy", Ezra discovers that his parents were killed in a prison revolt. In "Shroud of Darkness", it is revealed that Kanan fears Ezra might turn to the dark side, which partially happens when the former Sith Lord Maul draws him closer in "Twilight of the Apprentice" and in further episodes claims Ezra as his "apprentice", showing a marked interest in him. Ezra's first lightsaber is also destroyed during a confrontation with Darth Vader.

In the third season's premiere episode, "Steps Into Shadow", Ezra has built a new green-bladed lightsaber and is promoted to the rank of Lieutenant Commander of the Phoenix Squadron. He also assumes field leadership of the Ghost crew, due to Kanan's blindness preventing him from continuing the role. Due to his reckless leadership at the time, he is suspended from his position as Lieutenant Commander until further notice. The episodes "Shroud of Darkness", "The Holocrons of Fate", and "Twin Suns" reveal that Ezra has developed an obsession with "finding the key to destroying the Sith", which he interprets to be the exiled Jedi Master, Obi-Wan Kenobi. Ezra tracks Kenobi to Tatooine, but after meeting and talking with him, he realizes that his true mission is to help the Rebel Alliance fight the Empire. In the season finale, Ezra takes command of a squad during the battle against Grand Admiral Thrawn's fleet, indicating that his status as Lieutenant Commander has been restored. The Rebels ultimately lose the battle, but Ezra and the rest of the Ghost crew are able to escape.

In the fourth season, Ezra becomes somewhat lost after the death of his master, Kanan, but begins to understand Kanan's final lessons after he penetrates the Jedi Temple on Lothal in "A World Between Worlds". His connection to the Force-sensitive creatures of Lothal increases and, in the penultimate episode "A Fool's Hope" and the series finale "Family Reunion – and Farewell", Ezra summons the Loth-Wolves and the Purrgil to defeat Thrawn, who has assumed command of the Imperial forces on Lothal. After the Purrgil shatter the bridge observation ports on Thrawn's Star Destroyer, Ezra uses the Force to create a protecting air pocket for himself and Thrawn, and deliberately and selflessly allows himself to be taken away by the Purrgil.

==== Droid Tales ====
Ezra appears in the Lego Star Wars: Droid Tales episode "Mission to Mos Eisley", which adapts his role in the Rebels episode "Droids in Distress". He is voiced by Adrian Petriw.

==== Forces of Destiny ====
Ezra appears in the Forces of Destiny episode "A Disarming Lesson", in which Ahsoka Tano teaches him a lesson in finding his inner strength and trusting in the Force.

==== Ahsoka ====
Eman Esfandi as Ezra Bridger in Ahsoka

Ezra made his live-action debut in the Disney+ series Ahsoka, portrayed by Eman Esfandi. He first appears in "Part One: Master and Apprentice" in a hologram message that he recorded before his disappearance. Ezra makes his first in-person appearance in "Part Six: Far, Far Away", reuniting with Sabine Wren after she tracked him to the galaxy he and Thrawn had disappeared to. In the first season finale, "Part Eight: The Jedi, the Witch, and the Warlord", Ezra builds himself a new lightsaber and attempts to prevent Thrawn's escape alongside Sabine and Ahsoka. While the latter two stay behind, Ezra is able to board Thrawn's ship and returns to the original galaxy, where he reunites with Hera Syndulla.

Ezra has been confirmed to be returning in the show's second season, with Eman Esfandi reprising his role.

=== Novels ===
On August 5, 2014, Del Rey Books published Star Wars: Ezra's Gamble, a prequel novel to the Rebels short film "Property of Ezra Bridger".

=== Video games ===
Ezra, based on his appearance from the first two seasons of Rebels, has been featured as a playable character in several Star Wars video games, including the tower defense mobile game Galactic Defense, the run-and-gun game Rebels: Recon Missions, and the toys-to-life game Disney Infinity 3.0. He is also featured in Lego Star Wars: The Force Awakens and Lego Star Wars: The Skywalker Saga as downloadable content, while a bird version of Ezra, represented by Red, appears in Angry Birds Star Wars II.

Ezra is also playable in the turn-based mobile role-playing game Star Wars: Galaxy of Heroes, and the real-time strategy game Star Wars: Force Arena. Both games use the character's design from the latter seasons of Rebels, after he built his green lightsaber.

== Merchandise ==
A Funko Pop figurine of Ezra Bridger was released on October 6, 2016, based on his Star Wars: Rebels appearance. In late 2024, a new figurine was released, based on the character's appearance in Ahsoka. In 2020, The Black Series produced a 6-inch action figure of Ezra as a part of a Star Wars and The Mandalorian line. Ezra has also appeared in minifigure form in multiple Lego sets based on Rebels and Ahsoka.

== Critical reception ==
Ezra Bridger has received generally positive feedback from fans and reviewers. Screen Rant ranked him seventh on a list of the best characters from Star Wars Rebels, saying "his arc across the four seasons is fantastic, and he truly grows and matures into a great character", as well as praising his "beautifully completed [series] personal arc" following the conclusion of the fourth season. Comic Book Resources writer Ian Goodwillie praised Ezra for his second-season depiction as "a character [who] had pointed out the inherent reality of the Clone Wars", comparing him to Maul and praising his mentorship with Hondo Ohnaka. Kelsey Yoor complimented the character's utilization of "the archetypal teachings of Joseph Campbell, particularly regarding The Hero's Journey. Collider praised Ezra's relationship with Grand Admiral Thrawn and "fitting" conclusion to their character arc, while Dork Side of the Force praised him as "one of the best characters in the entire story universe" of the Star Wars canon.

The character's return in Ahsoka, which marked his first live-action appearance, received similarly positive responses from fans, who were interested to discover his fate after the conclusion of Rebels. However, while Ezra's characterization and Eman Esfandi's portrayal were generally praised, some viewers disliked the character's integration into the narrative.

== Relationships ==
Jedi Order master-apprentice relationship

Yoda
Count; Dooku	Mace; Windu
Qui-Gon; Jinn	Depa; Billaba
Younglings
Obi-Wan; Kenobi	Kanan; Jarrus
Anakin; Skywalker	Luke; Skywalker	Ezra; Bridger
Ahsoka; Tano	Leia; Organa
Sabine Wren	Ben Solo (Note: Ben Solo and Rey are a Force dyad.)	Rey
Din Grogu
