= Ahsoka Tano =

Fictional character in the Star Wars franchise

- Star Wars character
- Ahsoka Tano as she appears from Seasons 3-5 of Star Wars: The Clone Wars
- First appearance: The Clone Wars film; August 10, 2008
- Created by: George Lucas; Dave Filoni
- Voiced by: Ashley Eckstein
- Portrayed by: Rosario Dawson; Ariana Greenblatt (young)
- Motion capture: Lauren Mary Kim (The Clone Wars)

In-universe information
- Aliases: Fulcrum; Ashla
- Nicknames: Snips; Little Soka; Lady Tano; Commander Tano
- Species: Togruta
- Occupation: Padawan; Rebel Alliance spymaster; Jedi Knight
- Affiliation: Jedi Order; Galactic Republic; Rebel Alliance
- Master: Anakin Skywalker
- Apprentice: Sabine Wren
- Homeworld: Shili

Ahsoka Tano (/əˈsoʊkə ˈtɑːnoʊ/; ə-SO-kə TAH-no) is a fictional character in the Star Wars franchise. She was introduced as the 14-year-old Togruta Jedi Padawan of Anakin Skywalker in the animated film Star Wars: The Clone Wars (2008) before appearing in the subsequent animated television series (2008–2014; 2020); the sequel series Star Wars Rebels (2014–2018); in the live-action film Star Wars: The Rise of Skywalker (2019) as a voiceover cameo; and in the miniseries Tales of the Jedi (2022), all voiced by Ashley Eckstein. In 2020, Ahsoka made her live-action debut in the second season of the Disney+ series The Mandalorian, portrayed by Rosario Dawson. Dawson reprised the role in a 2022 episode of the spin-off series The Book of Boba Fett, and the 2023 series, Ahsoka.

== Creation and development ==
=== Concept ===
Concept art of Ahsoka Tano

Ahsoka was created by George Lucas and Dave Filoni. The character was developed to illustrate how Anakin Skywalker develops from the brash, undisciplined Padawan apprentice in Star Wars: Episode II – Attack of the Clones (2002) to the more reserved Jedi Knight in Episode III – Revenge of the Sith (2005). Lucas, who had two daughters, also wanted the character to appeal to girls. Early in development, Ahsoka's name was "Ashla", which was one of the original names for the light side of the Force. (Note: According to Filoni, "I think it was the name given to one of the [younglings] in Attack of the Clones. There was a little Togruta girl. We kicked around the idea that maybe that was ... the same character [but] she was too young in the film.") Lucas renamed her after the ancient Indian emperor Ashoka; the spelling was then altered by screenwriter Henry Gilroy. She later uses the name "Ashla" in hiding after Order 66.

Filoni, The Clone Wars supervising director and writer, wrote a fable about Ahsoka's early childhood to help develop the character. He imagined the discovery that she has "the right stuff" to become a Jedi would be a cause for celebration in her hometown. Filoni said he is protective of the Ahsoka character.

Ahsoka was originally intended as Obi-Wan Kenobi's Padawan, but Lucas reassigned her to Anakin to break their repetitive dynamic and emphasize Anakin's growth from apprentice to equal by placing him in a mentoring role. Filoni and Gilroy developed her character as a blend of "Anakin’s brashness and Obi-Wan’s measured judgment," symbolizing "the shift from the Republic to the oncoming Empire." Ahsoka and Anakin's relationship was seen as an essential story arc spanning both the animated film and the Clone Wars television series.

=== Writing ===
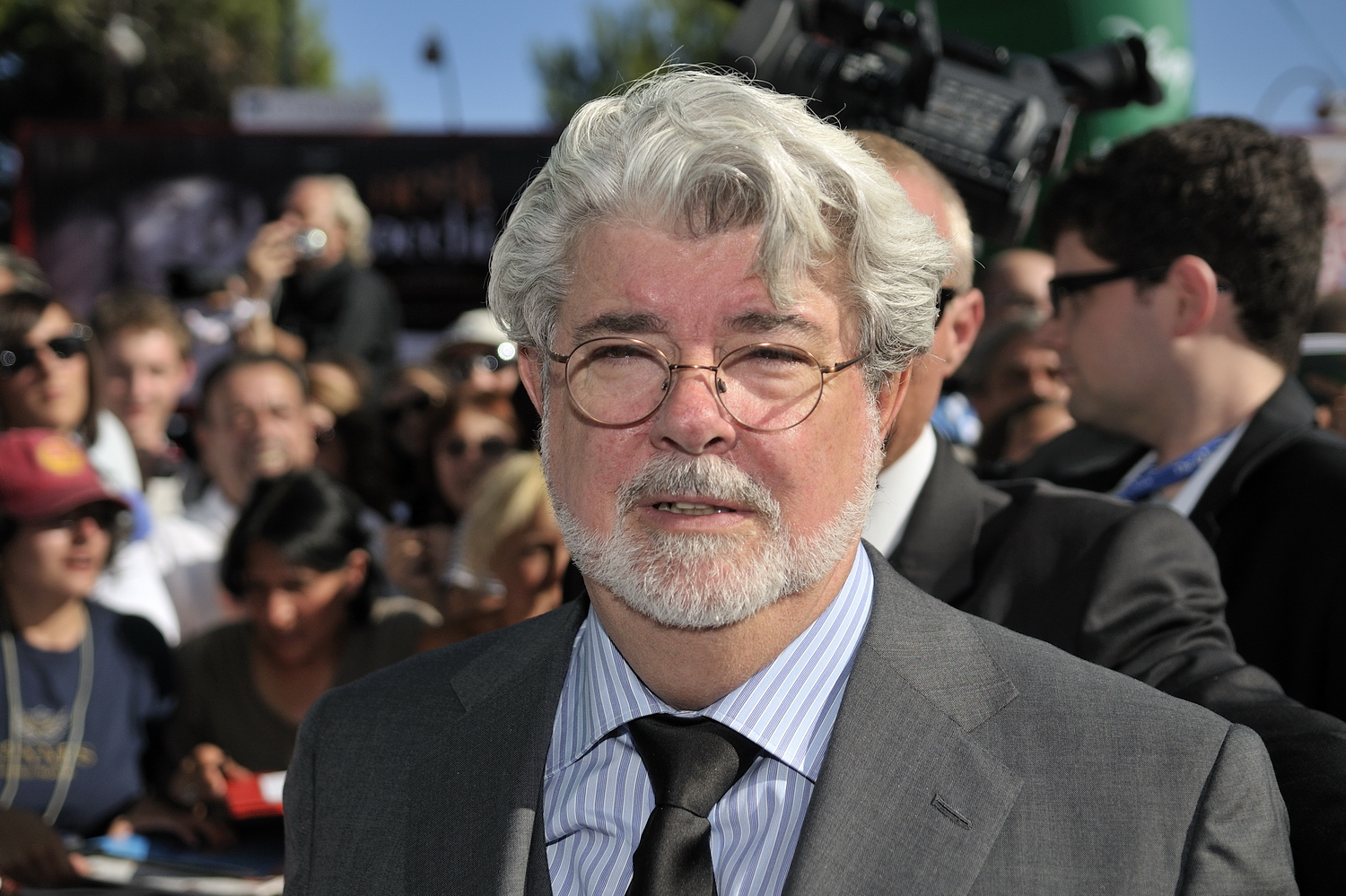
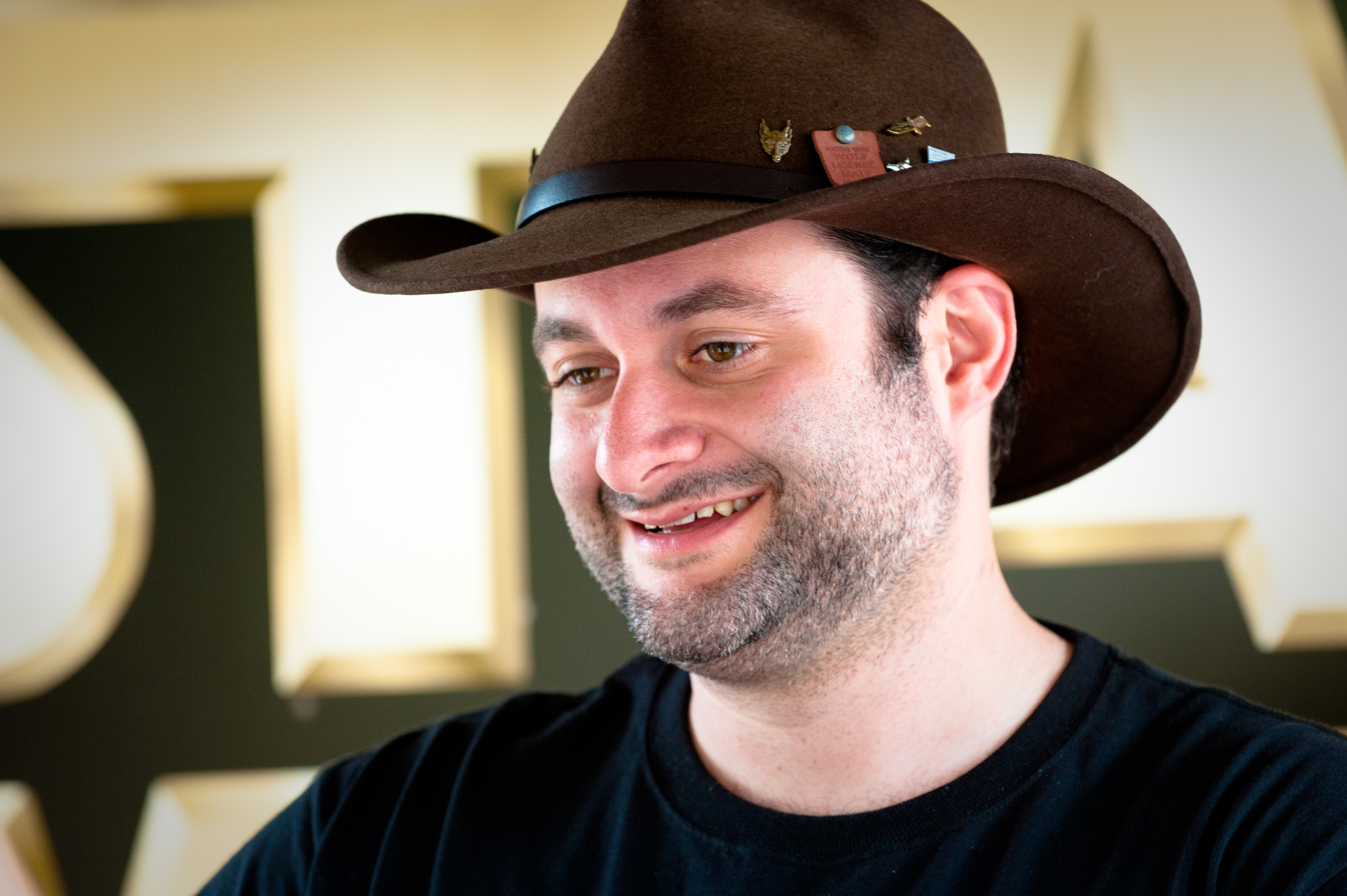
George Lucas (top) and Dave Filoni (bottom), Ahsoka Tano's co-creators

Filoni initially struggled with writing Ahsoka because he had "zero perspective" on what it was like to be a 14-year-old girl. He, therefore, shifted his focus and instead wrote Ahsoka primarily as a Jedi who just happens to be an adolescent female. Filoni said he "has always had a story in mind" for Ahsoka's overall development. He began thinking about the final confrontation between Ahsoka and Vader ever since he started writing material for Ahsoka; different iterations had different endings, including one in which Vader kills Ahsoka just as she slashes open his helmet to reveal his scarred face.

Ashley Eckstein, who primarily voiced Ahsoka, said she and the writers were aware that audiences initially found the character annoying, and that there was a "fine line" between Ahsoka being bratty and becoming endearing. Because production was a year ahead of what was broadcast, with Ahsoka developing over that time, Eckstein implored fans to be patient with the character's growth.

Although Ahsoka leaves the Jedi Order at the end of The Clone Wars' fifth season, the storyline initially had her return to the Order. Filoni said this would be the "normal" arc and suggested to Lucas that she instead remain expelled; Lucas agreed as a compromise as he believed Ahsoka did not survive Order 66, the mass murder of the Jedi portrayed in Star Wars Episode III: Revenge of the Sith.

The Fulcrum character introduced early in Star Wars Rebels was always understood to be Ahsoka. Filoni, who served as executive producer and co-creator of Rebels, worked with Lucas on identifying what Ahsoka would know about Anakin's fate. Filoni also collaborated with executive producer Simon Kinberg and season one executive producer Greg Weisman on developing Ahsoka's role as a Rebel agent.

The show's writers were excited for Ahsoka's return in the second season, and Filoni was anxious about Rebels instead becoming "The Ahsoka Tano Show". Consequently, Filoni required that Ahsoka play a role in service of Rebels' main characters, Ezra Bridger and Kanan Jarrus; he saw Ahsoka's new role as similar to the one played by Obi-Wan Kenobi in Star Wars. Although Ahsoka is more mature in Rebels, Filoni wanted "aspects of that kid who was there to shine through". He initially envisioned Ahsoka as a more "passive player" not engaged in combat, but later decided it was more appropriate to see Ahsoka as a warrior during a turbulent time. Ahsoka's presence was necessary to allow Darth Vader to encounter the show's lead characters without the latter being destroyed; Ahsoka can stand toe-to-toe with Vader.

Filoni cites fans' passion for the character as one reason for Ahsoka's prominence in Clone Wars and Rebels.

=== Voice acting ===
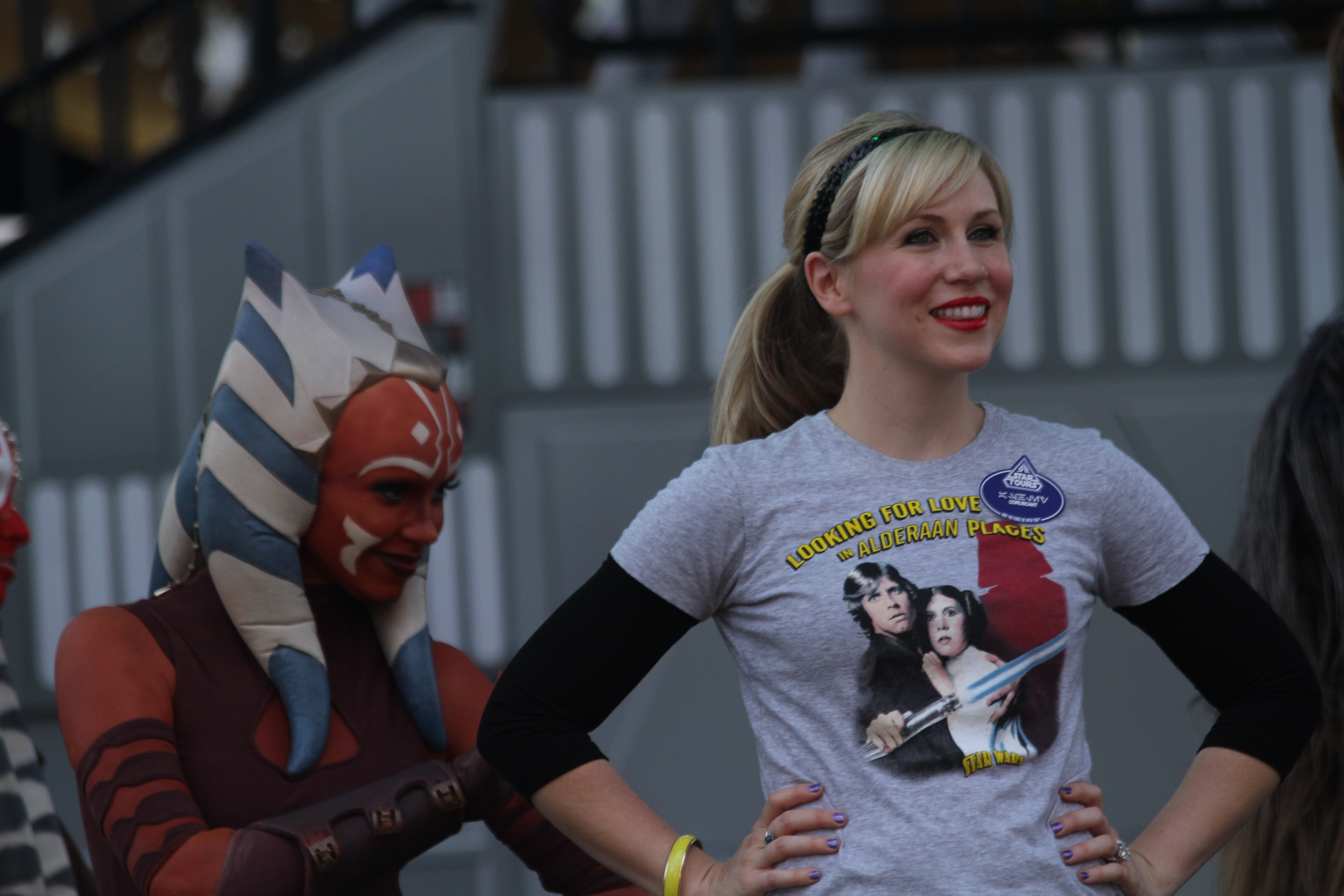
Ashley Eckstein (Ahsoka's voice actor) at Star Wars Weekends 2012

Eckstein said Filoni wanted her to bring some of her personality into the Ahsoka character; he said her actions and speech between audition takes had earned her the part more than the actual audition. Once production on The Clone Wars began, it took about six months for Eckstein and the writers to understand Ahsoka; consequently, much of the dialogue for the first half of season one was re-recorded to depict the character better. Eckstein also said the Ahsoka character was solidified by the casting of Matt Lanter as Anakin, which occurred halfway through the first season. Eckstein said that initially Ahsoka was said to have an Icelandic accent.

Eckstein reprised the role of Ahsoka for Rebels, although she did not do all of Fulcrum's voice work. She learned about Ahsoka's return about a year before the first season's finale aired and said it was hard to keep it a secret. Eckstein said Ahsoka developed a quiet confidence and quiet strength the younger character does not possess, but sometimes she played Ahsoka too seriously; she pointed out that "snippiness" and determination are still part of Ahsoka's personality. Eckstein pitched her voice down a bit but, because she and Ahsoka were now much closer in age, generally spoke like herself.

Not knowing Ahsoka's experiences between The Clone Wars and Rebels at times presented challenges for Eckstein's performance. Filoni avoids giving the actors plot details that might inappropriately affect their performance; for example, he did not tell Eckstein whether Ahsoka survives her duel with Darth Vader lest Eckstein telegraph something in her performance that the character would not know.

=== Appearance ===
Ahsoka as she appears in Star Wars Rebels. Ahsoka wears "pseudo-samurai" armor in Star Wars Rebels, and her lightsabers' lack of color indicates she is neither a Jedi nor Sith. Her facial markings and head-tails' length differ from those in The Clone Wars due to her age.

Ahsoka's design evolved over three years before her introduction in the Clone Wars film. Her appearance was inspired by San from Princess Mononoke. Originally, she was not intended to be as young as she ended up being. Early maquettes by sculptor Darren Marshall featured more mature facial features, including defined cheekbones, but Lucas felt she resembled a "classic UFO alien," prompting a redesign toward a more youthful look.

Ahsoka initially appears in what Wired called a "tube-top-and-miniskirt costume." In the third season, Ahsoka and other characters received new costumes. Filoni said the changes were meant to bring the show's aesthetic closer to that of Revenge of the Sith and were made possible by improved animation techniques. For the seventh and final season of Clone Wars, Ahsoka's design was once again tweaked due to improvements in animation technology. Her costume was also changed to a more grayish-blue color, similar to her appearance in Star Wars Rebels, which aired before the season.

Ahsoka often uses a reverse lightsaber grip, similar to that of the Japanese film character Zatoichi. Along with the costume change in the third season of Clone Wars, Ahsoka also received a second lightsaber. In the seventh and final season, she received new blue lightsabers.

Ahsoka's armor in Rebels is based on a "pseudo-samurai look" influenced by photographs of samurai women. The armor is meant to appear as if she found it in an ancient Jedi temple, and her lightsabers' colorless blades indicate she is neither a Jedi nor a Sith. Filoni said the white lightsabers appear much better than he anticipated. Her facial markings were changed to show that she has aged. It was "new ground" for the production team to shift Ahsoka's animation style to reflect her older age.

== Depiction ==
=== Film ===
==== The Clone Wars (2008) ====
Ahsoka Tano was introduced in the 2008 Clone Wars animated film (serving as a pilot for the television series of the same name) as a 14-year-old Padawan apprentice, assigned by Yoda to Anakin Skywalker to teach him responsibility. Anakin is initially frustrated by this decision. Their early interactions are "playfully contentious", with Anakin calling her "Snips" for her "snippy" attitude and Ahsoka calling him "Skyguy" as a play on his surname.

==== The Rise of Skywalker (2019) ====
Ahsoka Tano makes a vocal cameo in Star Wars: The Rise of Skywalker as one of the Jedi spirits who help Rey fight the resurrected Darth Sidious, strongly indicating that she will die prior to these events. Eckstein returned to voice the character in the film.

=== Television ===
==== Animated series ====
===== The Clone Wars (2008–2014; 2020) =====
Ahsoka is a main character in six of the seven seasons of Star Wars: The Clone Wars. She is a padawan-commander of the 501st Legion in the Grand Army of the Republic and continues to learn the ways of the Jedi as Anakin's apprentice. The two develop a mutual fondness, at times taking great risks to protect or save one another. Some of Anakin's actions taken out of concern for Ahsoka expose his darker tendencies, such as his torture of prisoners who may know her location when she goes missing. Ahsoka also finds mentorship from Captain Rex, a clone trooper with whom she and Anakin serve throughout the war. During the final arc of season five, Ahsoka is framed and imprisoned for a deadly explosion and a subsequent murder, both of which were committed by her friend Barriss Offee. Although eventually exonerated, she becomes disillusioned with the Jedi Council and departs from the Jedi Order in the season finale.

Filoni said an initial finale concept for The Clone Wars would have had Rex escape Order 66, and his and Ahsoka's presence elsewhere would have explained both characters' absence from Revenge of the Sith. Ahsoka returns in the seventh and final season of The Clone Wars, being the focus of two of the three story arcs featured in the season, which aired in 2020 on Disney+. The final four episodes, set during the events of Revenge of the Sith, sees Ahsoka briefly reuniting with Anakin and Obi-Wan prior to their leaving to Coruscant to save Chancellor Palpatine, secretly the Sith Lord Darth Sidious. Before departing to Mandalore, Rex is promoted to Commander in the 332nd Division (split from the 501st Legion) with Ahsoka as an advisor to capture the former Sith Lord Maul. During the siege of Mandalore, Ahsoka confronts Maul; he reveals that Sidious intends to make Anakin his new apprentice and offers to join forces to prevent this, but she does not believe him. Ahsoka defeats and captures Maul, but on the way to Coruscant, she senses her former master in trouble, though unaware that he has fallen to the dark side. When Order 66 is issued, Ahsoka's clone troopers, including Rex, turn on her, but she escapes and manages to remove Rex's chip controlling his brain, while also freeing Maul to create a distraction. Ahsoka and Rex escape the Venator-class Star Destroyer they are on before it crashes on a small moon, where they bury all the deceased clone troopers. Ahsoka also discards one of her lightsabers before parting ways with Rex. The final scene of the series depicts Darth Vader leading a search party on the moon and walking up to the remains of the ship. He notices Ahsoka's blade on the ground, picks it up, and ignites it, before leaving with the saber in silence.

===== Rebels (2014–2018) =====
Ahsoka is a secretive Rebel agent in the first season of Star Wars Rebels, which takes place 14 years after The Clone Wars concludes. Operating under the codename "Fulcrum", she provides the Rebel crew of the Ghost with intelligence and supplies, while disguising her appearance by using an altered voice and appearing as a hooded hologram. Her identity is revealed in the season finale.

She becomes a recurring character in the second season, continuing to help lead a group of Rebel forces and working with the Ghost's crew, especially with its Jedi members Ezra Bridger and Kanan Jarrus. Having assumed that Anakin died like most other Jedi at the end of the Clone Wars, she is overwhelmed to recognize her mentor under "a layer of hate" in Darth Vader. Later in the season, a vision of Anakin blames her for leaving him and allowing him to fall to the dark side. In the season finale, Ahsoka duels with Darth Vader inside a Sith temple on Malachor, allowing her friends from the Ghost to escape Vader and the temple's destruction. She is horrified to confirm that he is her master after damaging his mask and hearing his voice. She tells him that she will not leave him again, but he sternly rejects her. As the episode concludes, Darth Vader is shown injured and leaving the temple, watched by a green and white owl. The owl, previously a companion to Ahsoka in the show and an avatar of the Daughter of Mortis, then flies back into the temple to witness Ahsoka seemingly walking deeper inside its walls. Filoni said Ahsoka's fate was ambiguous and "a bit open-ended" though Eckstein believed the character to still be alive.

In the fourth-season episode, "A World Between Worlds", Ahsoka's fate is finally revealed. Ezra, having ended up in the realm "between worlds and time" within the Jedi temple on Lothal and guided by Ahsoka's owl companion Morai, pulls her out of the moment before Vader could deliver the deathblow and thus altered her fate. Ahsoka is updated on what occurred to the Ghost crew while convincing Ezra to not prevent Kanan's fate as he would risk losing his own life. Emperor Palpatine/Darth Sidious then makes his presence known as he attempts to force Ezra into bringing him into the realm using Sith sorcery. Ahsoka helps Ezra escape while returning (with Morai) to her timeline moments after the Sith temple collapsed, vowing to find Ezra and the crew again. Ahsoka makes a return appearance in the epilogue of the series finale "Family Reunion and Farewell", returning to Lothal following the events of the Battle of Endor to join Sabine Wren in her quest to find Ezra, who disappeared during Lothal's liberation.

===== Tales of the Jedi (2022) =====
Ahsoka appears in three episodes of the animated miniseries Tales of the Jedi: one depicting her birth and life as a toddler, one showing her as a Padawan under Anakin Skywalker, and one adapting the events of the 2016 novel Ahsoka, depicting her life after the events of Order 66 and before Star Wars Rebels.

==== Live-action series ====
Rosario Dawson as Ahsoka Tano in The Mandalorian, the character's first live-action appearance

Rosario Dawson expressed interest in playing Ahsoka Tano in early 2017, with some fan support. In March 2020, Dawson was reported to be appearing as the character in the second season of the Disney+ series, The Mandalorian. Ahsoka made an appearance in "Chapter 13: The Jedi", the fifth episode of the second season. Dawson reprises her role as Ahsoka in "Chapter 6: From the Desert Comes a Stranger" of The Book of Boba Fett.

In December 2020, Lucasfilm announced Ahsoka would be getting her limited series on Disney+, titled Ahsoka. Developed by Jon Favreau and Dave Filoni, it exists alongside The Mandalorian and The Book of Boba Fett through interconnected stories culminating in a "climactic story event". Dawson is scheduled to reprise her role as Ahsoka Tano in season 2 in 2027.

===== The Mandalorian (2020) =====
During her search for Grand Admiral Thrawn, she attempts to liberate the city of Calidan on Corvus from Imperial occupation, and encounters the titular character, who was told to seek her out by Bo-Katan Kryze so that she could train "The Child". Communing with him through the Force, she learns that the child's name is Grogu and that he was raised at the Jedi Temple on Coruscant, before being rescued during the Great Jedi Purge and hidden for his safety, which is why he suppresses his Force powers. Sensing great fear in Grogu, and a deep connection with the Mandalorian, Ahsoka refuses to take him as an apprentice, fearing that he could follow the same dark path as her former master. After the Mandalorian helps her liberate Calidan, Ahsoka tells him to take Grogu to the Jedi Temple on Tython, where he might be able to reach out to another Jedi through the Force.

===== The Book of Boba Fett (2022) =====
While visiting Luke Skywalker's Jedi academy where Grogu had started his Jedi training, Ahsoka reunites with the Mandalorian, who came to visit Grogu and give him a gift: a beskar chain mail forged by the Armorer. Ahsoka advises the Mandalorian against seeing Grogu, as it would hinder his training due to the Jedi's strict rules against personal attachments. The Mandalorian reluctantly follows Ahsoka's advice, who offers to deliver the gift in his place. After the Mandalorian leaves, Ahsoka gives the chain mail to Luke who says he is uncertain whether Grogu is fully committed to the Jedi path or not, and that he is not sure how to handle that fact. Ahsoka tells Luke that trait is reminiscent of his father during her apprenticeship with him, and advises him to follow his instincts on the matter before leaving the planet.

===== Star Wars: Ahsoka (2023–2027) =====
Dawson reprised her role in the series Star Wars: Ahsoka, which is a spin-off of The Mandalorian and focuses on Ahsoka's quest to find Grand Admiral Thrawn and Ezra Bridger. She is accompanied by Sabine Wren (portrayed by Natasha Liu Bordizzo), Hera Syndulla (portrayed by Mary Elizabeth Winstead) and Huyang (voiced by David Tennant).

=== Other media ===
Filoni said he does not want Ahsoka thought of as an animated character, but rather as a Star Wars character who can exist "in all forms of media".

Ahsoka appears in the Star Wars Forces of Destiny animated web series, in the Touching Darkness episode of the Star Wars: Tales From The Far, Far, Away fan comic, and as a collectible, playable character in the Disney Infinity 3.0 video game. In the Lego Star Wars: The Mandalorian animated special, Ahsoka is voiced by Bill Burr as Migs Mayfeld recounts how she met the Mandalorian and Grogu, and again by Dawson later in the special.

At Star Wars Celebration Europe 2016, Filoni, Eckstein, and Lucasfilm Story Group member Pablo Hidalgo held a panel about Ahsoka's "Untold Tales" that occur between The Clone Wars and Rebels.

Ahsoka appeared in Fortnite: Battle Royale as part of the Chapter 4, Season 4 Battle Pass on September 26 2023. Her Clone Warsappearance arrived in May 2026.

==== Ahsoka (2016) ====
Star Wars: Ahsoka is a young-adult novel by E. K. Johnston published in October 2016. It is set between the events of The Clone Wars and Rebels, and makes several references to Ahsoka's "Untold Tales", elements of which were later adapted in the seventh season revival of The Clone Wars. Filoni was heavily involved in developing the novel, and the cover art by Jason P. Wojtowicz is based on a sketch Filoni created several years prior. Eckstein narrates the audiobook version. The novel was on the New York Times best sellers list and in the category of young adult hardcovers it reached number one shortly after release. Although the seventh season of The Clone Wars retconned several elements from the novel, it was still considered largely canon before its events were ultimately loosely adapted as "Resolve", the first-season finale of Tales of the Jedi.

== Critical response ==
After her introduction, some critics called Ahsoka annoying and predicted the character would die before The Clone Wars series ended because she does not appear in Revenge of the Sith. The Los Angeles Times called Ahsoka a "carefully calculated-to-be-cute" character in The Clone Wars film. Wired criticized Ahsoka's "half-naked" appearance in The Clone Wars' first two seasons, calling her third-season costume change "more appropriate". Blastr said Ahsoka's initial immaturity gives the character room to grow, saying she becomes "a well-rounded and complex character in every sense". Ahsoka's youth aided her in being a point-of-view character for younger viewers. io9 called Ahsoka's development arc one of the best aspects of The Clone Wars, highlighting the character's role in exploring the nuances of war and the flaws of the Jedi Order. According to Tech Times, Ahsoka's maturation and development mirror the show's, and the producers chose wisely in making Ahsoka the audience's "entry point" to The Clone Wars. Chris Taylor called Ahsoka's decision to leave the Jedi Order "the show's most shocking cliffhanger". Ashley Eckstein was nominated for the 2012 and 2013 "Best Female Lead Vocal Performance in a Television Series — Action/Drama" awards from Behind the Voice Actors.

The Mary Sue said Ahsoka's relationship with Anakin is critical in understanding his development between Attack of the Clones and Revenge of the Sith, and the publication called Ahsoka a foil for Anakin's growth. Blastr commented that Anakin's interactions with Ahsoka help show that he is a powerful Jedi and war hero. Blastr also hypothesized that Anakin's sense of failure when Ahsoka leaves the Jedi contributes to his fall to the dark side; io9 posited that Anakin might have succeeded in reforming the Jedi if Ahsoka had stayed with him. io9 said Ahsoka, more than Anakin, articulates moral guidance in The Clone Wars.

Blastr identified Ahsoka as one of the most important characters in Star Wars, especially for young girls who, until that point, had not seen a potent female Jedi depicted on screen. Erika Travis of California Baptist University said Ahsoka is "compassionate and feminine, without being overtly sexualized". Mara Wood called Ahsoka a feminist icon, adding that Ahsoka is one of several characters that make The Clone Wars superior to the original and prequel trilogies in depicting strong women. Wood added that Ahsoka probably shows the most growth of any woman in the Star Wars canon.

== Relationships ==
Jedi Order master-apprentice relationship

Yoda
Count; Dooku	Mace; Windu
Qui-Gon; Jinn	Depa; Billaba
Younglings
Obi-Wan; Kenobi	Kanan; Jarrus
Anakin; Skywalker	Luke; Skywalker	Ezra; Bridger
Ahsoka; Tano	Leia; Organa
Sabine Wren	Ben Solo (Note: Ben Solo and Rey are a Force dyad.)	Rey
Din Grogu
