= Ahsoka (novel) =

2016 novel by E. K. Johnston

- Author: E. K. Johnston; Dave Filoni (outline)
- Audio read by: Ashley Eckstein
- Cover artist: Jason P. Wojtowicz
- Language: English
- Series: Star Wars
- Genre: Science fiction Young adult fiction
- Publisher: Disney-Lucasfilm Press
- Publication date: October 11, 2016
- Publication place: United States
- Media type: Print (Hardcover)
- Pages: 400 (First edition, hardcover)
- ISBN: 978-1-4847-0566-7 (First edition, hardcover)
- Preceded by: Star Wars: The Clone Wars; Star Wars Rebels
- Followed by: "Resolve" (adaptation)

Ahsoka, also known as Star Wars: Ahsoka, is a Star Wars young adult novel written by E. K. Johnston, from an outline by Dave Filoni, and published on October 11, 2016. Set between the events of the 3D CGI animated television series Star Wars: The Clone Wars (2008–2014; 2020) and Star Wars Rebels (2014–2018), it is centered on the character Ahsoka Tano, the former apprentice of Anakin Skywalker.

== Plot synopsis ==
Ahsoka explores what happens to the titular character between her departure from Star Wars: The Clone Wars and her reappearance in Star Wars Rebels. A year after the events of Revenge of the Sith, Anakin has succumbed to the dark side and become Darth Vader, and Ahsoka has gone into hiding. Under the name "Ashla", she gains work as a mechanic and freighter pilot with the powerful Fardi clan on the planet Thabeska. However, she is forced to go into hiding after exposing her Force powers while trying to save the life of four-year-old Hedala Fardi, the youngest Fardi daughter.

Ahsoka settles down on the agrarian moon of Raada where she befriends several local farmers, including the teenage sisters Kaeden and Miara Larte and their guardian Vartan. The Galactic Empire eventually establishes a presence on Raada and forces the farmers to plant new crops, which leach the moon's soils. Ahsoka becomes the leader of a resistance movement. However, the planned uprising goes awry, and Ahsoka exposes her Force powers during a skirmish with Imperial forces. In response, the Empire dispatches a Jedi-hunting Inquisitor known as the Sixth Brother to hunt Ahsoka.

Having attracted the attention of the Empire, Ahsoka is forced to leave Raada. Princess Leia's adoptive father, Senator Bail Organa, takes an interest in Imperial reports about Ahsoka and decides to find her. Returning to the Fardis, Ahsoka resumes work as a pilot and mechanic. She learns that a "shadow" (who turns out to be the Sixth Brother) has been stalking the Force-sensitive Hedala. With the Empire tightening its grip on Thabeska, the Fardi patriarch advises Ahsoka to leave. While fleeing from a Black Sun gangster, Ahsoka's ship is captured by two pilots in the service of Senator Organa.

Mistaking the pilots for threats, Ahsoka knocks them unconscious. She encounters R2-D2 and convinces him to smuggle her aboard Organa's corvette. Ahsoka forges an alliance with Organa in return for his help in protecting Force-sensitive children from the Empire. Returning to Raada, she finds Miara and learns that the Sixth Brother captured her older sister Kaeden. Following a lightsaber duel, Ahsoka defeats and kills the Sixth Brother, and takes his kyber crystals to forge new twin lightsabers for herself, which have white blades. After freeing Kaeden, Ahsoka organizes an evacuation of Raada's population with Organa's help. Organa's rebel fleet manages to evacuate the Raada farms following a skirmish with Imperial forces.

Following the events on Raada, Ahsoka decides to join Organa's rebellion while the Larte sisters and the other refugees settle down on Alderaan. Seeing that someone needs to make it possible for the balance of power to shift, Ahsoka chooses "Fulcrum" as her code-name. Meanwhile, the Empire dispatches the Grand Inquisitor, a perennial antagonist from Star Wars Rebels, to hunt down Ahsoka.

== Publication ==
Ahsoka was announced in March 2016, with a release date of October 11, 2016. It was written by E. K. Johnston, from an outline by Dave Filoni on the life of Ahsoka Tano in-between the events of the fifth season of Star Wars: The Clone Wars (2012–2013) and the character's return in Star Wars Rebels (2015–2018). With the 2020 revival of The Clone Wars, the events of the novel concerning the Siege of Mandalore and Order 66 were adapted in the four-part finale of the show's seventh and final season. In 2022, the novel's main story was adapted for "Resolve", the final episode of the miniseries Tales of the Jedi.

== Adaptations ==
In 2020, the flashback chapters of Ahsoka, depicting the title character's role in the Siege of Mandalore, duel with the former Sith Lord Maul, and escape from Order 66, were adapted as the four-part series finale of the revival of Star Wars: The Clone Wars, written by Dave Filoni and directed by Saul Ruiz and Nathaniel Villanueva. In 2022, the main events of Ahsoka were loosely adapted as "Resolve", the first-season finale of Tales of the Jedi, written by Filoni and directed by Ruiz.

== Reception ==
Ahsoka was popular with readers, debuting at #1 on The New York Times Best Seller list for Young Adults, staying there for three weeks, and remaining on the list for eight weeks. The book also reached #28 overall on the USA Today best-seller list.

The novel was reviewed by Booklist, Kirkus Reviews, IGN, and Den of Geek.
