= Siege of Mandalore =

9th, 10th, 11th and 12th episodes of the 7th season of Star Wars: The Clone Wars

- Star Wars: The Clone Wars episodes
- Poster for "The Phantom Apprentice"
- Episode nos.: Season 7 Episodes 9, 10, 11, 12
- Directed by: Saul Ruiz (9, 11); Nathaniel Villanueva (10, 12)
- Written by: Dave Filoni
- Production code: 7.21–7.24
- Original release dates: April 17, 2020 (9); April 24, 2020 (10); May 1, 2020 (11); May 4, 2020 (12)

Episode chronology
← Previous "Together Again"	Next → —
- Star Wars: The Clone Wars season 7

The Siege of Mandalore is the collective name used to refer to the four-part series finale of the American animated science fiction television series Star Wars: The Clone Wars. (Note: Attributed to multiple sources:) The story arc is composed of the episodes "Old Friends Not Forgotten", "The Phantom Apprentice", "Shattered", and "Victory and Death", which are respectively the ninth, tenth, eleventh, and twelfth episodes of the seventh season of the series.

The series chronicles various events in the Clone Wars, a galactic conflict between the Galactic Republic and the Separatist Alliance that takes place during the Star Wars prequel trilogy. It primarily follows Jedi Knight Anakin Skywalker and his closest associates as they seek to help the Republic win the war. The arc takes place before and concurrently with the events of the film Revenge of the Sith, and follows Ahsoka Tano and Rex as they seek to liberate Mandalore from Maul, who had occupied it. After Maul's capture, Ahsoka and Rex are then forced to deal with the effects of Order 66.

All four episodes were released weekly on the streaming service Disney+ in April and May 2020. The arc received critical acclaim, with reviewers finding it emotionally resonant and a worthy conclusion to the series.

== Plot ==
=== "Old Friends Not Forgotten" ===
Ahsoka Tano and Bo-Katan Kryze contact Anakin Skywalker and Obi-Wan Kenobi, asking them for help in apprehending Maul in his new hideout on Mandalore. While Obi-Wan is apprehensive, Anakin and the 501st give Ahsoka a warm welcome until news arrives that General Grievous and the Separatists are attacking Coruscant. Upon Anakin's suggestion, Rex (field-promoted to commander) and part of the 501st accompanies Ahsoka to Mandalore, forcing Maul's loyalists under Gar Saxon into retreat. Bo-Katan apprehends Prime Minister Almec, while Ahsoka follows a trail into the city's tunnel network, only to walk right into Maul's trap.

=== "The Phantom Apprentice" ===
Ahsoka faces off against Maul, who mentions Darth Sidious before escaping. Ahsoka relays this to Obi-Wan, who says he had inferred from Count Dooku that Sidious is the name of the Sith Lord who orchestrated the Clone Wars. Obi-Wan stresses that Maul must be taken alive as he may be their only chance to learn more about Darth Sidious, as Dooku was recently killed by Anakin. The captured Almec mentions that Maul had hoped to lure Anakin to Mandalore, but is assassinated by Gar before he can reveal why. As Bo-Katan's and Rex's forces lead a final assault against Maul's Mandalorians, Ahsoka confronts Maul again, who reveals that Sidious has engineered the destruction of both the Galactic Republic and the Jedi and asks Ahsoka to join him to stop Sidious. When she demands to know his intentions with Anakin, Maul claims that Sidious wants to make him his new apprentice, and that he had hoped to kill Anakin before this happens. Refusing to believe him, Ahsoka fights Maul above the city, where she rescues him from falling to his death. She then leaves Maul to be captured by clone troopers, despite his frantic warnings that everyone will soon die.

=== "Shattered" ===
With the siege of Mandalore over, Ahsoka and Rex prepare to take Maul before the Jedi Council on Coruscant. Mace Windu and Yoda contact Ahsoka via hologram and reveal that Obi-Wan has tracked Grievous down to Utapau, indicating that the war may soon be over. On their way to Coruscant, however, Ahsoka senses Anakin falling to the dark side and helping Darth Sidious to kill Windu, moments before Sidious executes Order 66, which brands all Jedi as traitors to the Republic and orders their deaths. As Ahsoka's clone troopers, including Rex, suddenly turn on her, she is forced to escape. Rex resists the order just long enough to mention the incident with Fives, allowing Ahsoka to learn about the inhibitor chips. She releases Maul to create a distraction, then subdues and captures Rex. With the help of three astromech droids, Ahsoka removes the inhibitor chip from his brain, restoring his free will.

=== "Victory and Death" ===
As Ahsoka and Rex try to escape from the cruiser, Maul destroys its hyperdrive, causing the vessel to drop out of hyperspace and into a nearby moon's gravitational field. Forced to fight their way through the clones, Ahsoka tries to prevent Maul from getting away in their shuttle but lets him get away after choosing to help Rex. Just barely clearing the doomed ship, Ahsoka and Rex escape to the moon, where they respectfully bury the clones and Ahsoka discards her lightsabers. Two years later, Anakin, now as Darth Vader, arrives on the moon and recovers Ahsoka's main lightsaber from the wrecked cruiser.

== Production ==
=== Development and writing ===
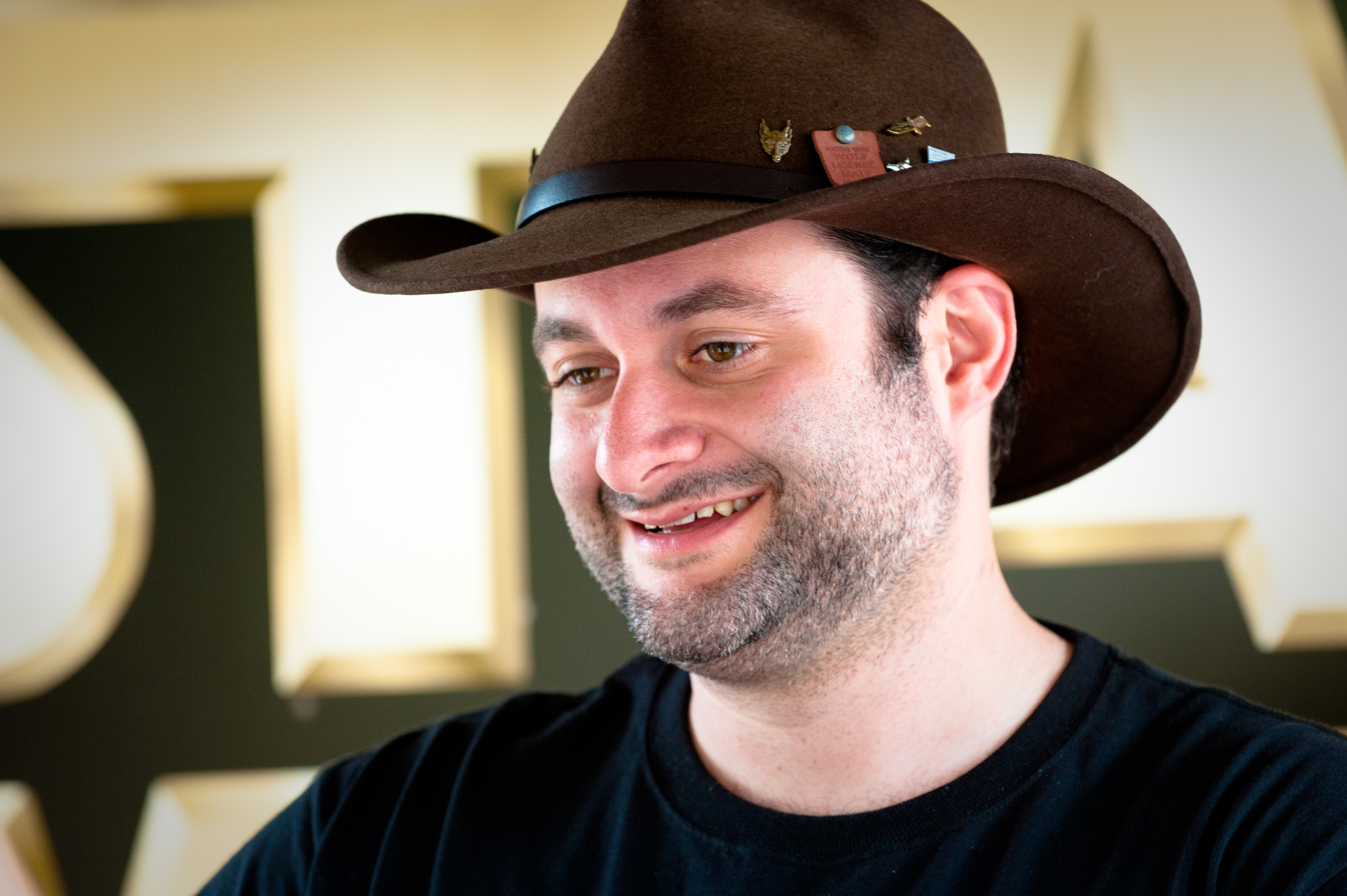
All four episodes were written by series supervising director Dave Filoni.

All four episodes that make up the story arc were written by Star Wars: The Clone Wars supervising director Dave Filoni. Following the purchase of Lucasfilm by The Walt Disney Company, the series was cancelled in March 2013 following the release of the fifth season on Cartoon Network, and midway through the production of the sixth of eight planned seasons. This left unreleased episodes in various stages of production, from completely finished episodes to episodes that were still in early development. The completed episodes were released onto Netflix on March 7, 2014, as a truncated thirteen-episode sixth season, subtitled The Lost Missions. Included in the unreleased episodes were plans of a series finale involving Ahsoka Tano and Rex fighting Darth Maul during the events of Revenge of the Sith, which had been written, originally by Matt Michnovetz, at the time of the series' cancellation. Despite the arc not having actually been released, Lucasfilm considered its events to have occurred within the Star Wars universe, affecting subsequent Star Wars media that was created during the following years.

It was announced on July 19, 2018, at San Diego Comic-Con that The Clone Wars would return for a seventh, final season. The idea to revive the series originated with Carrie Beck, who also served as a producer for the final season. The seventh season was made up of twelve episodes organized into three four-episode story arcs, all of which had been in development prior to the series' cancellation. The third arc, comprising the ninth, tenth, eleventh, and twelfth episodes of the seventh season, and the final four episodes of The Clone Wars, was the originally written series finale. George Lucas, the creator of The Clone Wars, was involved with the initial plans for the arc prior to the series' cancellation, but was uninvolved in work that was undertaken following the series' revival. Out of a desire to keep to Lucas's vision for the franchise, Filoni discussed series concepts and ideas with Lucas, and Lucas provided comments on the episodes of the final season as they were being produced. According to Maul voice actor Sam Witwer, the four episodes that compose the arc were designed as a four-part series finale that "is meant to be seen in its entirety together", as a movie. The arc was written to be able to be viewed completely standalone from any other episodes.

Substantial care was taken to ensure that the arc maintained continuity with existing works in the franchise. Despite the events of the Siege of Mandalore arc intersecting with Revenge of the Sith, Filoni avoided repeating the events of the film and ensured that they were almost entirely offscreen, despite them deeply affecting the events of the arc. Instead, he chose to focus on characters that were not in the prequel trilogy, such as Ahsoka and Rex. This was to ensure that the characters and plotline of the film remained intact, as well as out of a lack "of desire to tell any of those scenes necessarily again". He described it as "a challenge not getting something chronologically out of order", particularly for managing character knowledge of the secret identity of Palpatine, who does not physically appear in the arc but is manipulating its events. During the process of writing the 2016 novel Ahsoka, author E. K. Johnston was instructed to avoid writing action sequences set during the siege of Mandalore in order to avoid contradicting plans for the story arc in the series, which had, unbeknownst to her, been renewed. Although the 2003 miniseries Star Wars: Clone Wars is no longer canon to the franchise, in keeping with the original intent of the newer series to not supersede the miniseries, reference is made to Shaak Ti's failure to protect Palpatine, an event which is depicted in the miniseries. Following the series' initial cancellation in 2013, Filoni co-created a new series called Star Wars Rebels, set years after the events of The Clone Wars, in which characters prominently featured in the arc appear. The integration of The Clone Wars characters in Rebels affected how they were utilized in the Siege of Mandalore arc. Filoni felt that it was unfortunate that the appearance of the characters in Rebels may have caused the arc to have reduced tension, as the audience would know that those characters would survive.

"Old Friends Not Forgotten" was directed by Saul Ruiz. Filoni stated that due to Anakin Skywalker and Obi-Wan Kenobi prominently appearing in the prequel films, Ahsoka and Rex, the two principal original characters, were the main characters of the series, and that "there was a responsibility to tell the end of their story and then hand off Anakin and Obi-Wan to their proper conclusion, which is in the film Revenge of the Sith". He felt that an important part of the story was properly handling the emotional weight of the reunion and parting of Anakin and Ahsoka, who had been separated since the fifth-season episode "The Wrong Jedi", within the allotted time of the episode. He stated that as Ahsoka had gained experiences away from the Jedi Order, she had changed, while Anakin wished for things to return to how they were before. The cast and crew of the episode noted that key parts of the reunion included Ahsoka's reaction to the clones, who had painted their helmets to match her colors, and Anakin offering Ahsoka her old lightsabers, which was not part of the original script for the arc and was added after the series' renewal.

Maul (left), shrouded in darkness, confronts a brightly-lit Ahsoka Tano (right). Lighting concept by Molly Denmark.

"The Phantom Apprentice" was directed by Nathaniel Villanueva. The lighting in the initial confrontation between Maul and Ahsoka was designed so that Ahsoka was brightly lit and Maul walked out of the darkness, to create a sense of Ahsoka being trapped. The creators of the episode used a standard Star Wars trope, in which the villain asks the hero to join them, but modified it so that unlike in most instances of the trope, in this case the villain has the better plan. Witwer stated that unlike most animation voice acting, in which he usually exaggerates due to not being able to act facially, he and other cast members were asked to do a more restrained "film read", which was an influence from Filoni's work on the live-action Disney+ television series The Mandalorian. Several events from Revenge of the Sith were referenced throughout the episode to help ground the arc within the film's timeline. The title of the episode was designed to be applicable to both Maul and Ahsoka, as former apprentices of the Sith and Jedi, respectively, as well as Anakin, as the secret apprentice of Palpatine, unbeknownst to both himself and the other Jedi.

The creators of the episode felt that unlike the lightsaber duel between Obi-Wan Kenobi and Maul in the Rebels episode "Twin Suns", which was very brief, the duel between Ahsoka and Maul needed to be big, and that it was very important to make it among the best lightsaber fights in the series. To this end, Ray Park, who had physically portrayed Maul in The Phantom Menace, was brought in to perform motion capture for the character. Park devised a new fighting style for Maul, rather than reuse the style he used in The Phantom Menace, to reflect Maul having aged and gained robotic legs in the interim period. Keith Kellogg, the animation supervisor for the episode, explained that many of Park's mannerisms were implemented in the animation for Maul, and that the motion capture data then had to be altered to match the animation style of the series. Park's fighting was sometimes so fast that he would break the motion capture tracking. Opposite Park, stunt performer Lauren Mary Kim performed motion capture for Ahsoka. According to Filoni, Mary Kim "brought a lot of the speed and quickness that we needed to portray this character that had previously only been done by our animation team".

"Shattered" was directed by Saul Ruiz. According to Ashley Eckstein, the voice of Ahsoka, the episode's title reflects Ahsoka's worldview being shattered. The timeline of the episode coincides with Order 66, an event that occurs in the film Revenge of the Sith and affects events in the episode. Featuring Order 66 in the series was seen by the creators as an inevitable outcome, so they had been considering how to incorporate the event for a long time. Filoni described the problem of having to portray the event differently to its portrayal in Revenge of the Sith, as the audience of The Clone Wars saw the clone troopers as real characters. He stated that the key was "about understanding that they are in a situation where they don't have free will. [He] tried through every method possible, visually, musically, color-wise to show that they became somebody else". Various elements of the scenes in which the clones are hunting Rex and Ahsoka are framed to evoke the Empire, including the lighting and use of helmets. The use of droids as allies for the main characters was also reflective of the role reversal of the Galactic Republic, as battle droids were the primary force of their enemy, the Separatists. Filoni used Ahsoka and Rex reciting the catchphrase "I am one with the Force and the Force is with me" from Rogue One to display the bond between the characters and provide an explanation of how Ahsoka is able to remove Rex's inhibitor chip for those that may not have seen a previous arc in The Clone Wars.

"Victory and Death" was directed by Nathaniel Villanueva. The original plan for Ahsoka's escape from the clone troopers involved the clones running into what appeared to be a forest, only for the "trees" they thought they were running past to be revealed to be the legs of huge wolves. Ahsoka would then escape on the back of a wolf, as a reference to the character San from Princess Mononoke, who was the inspiration for Ahsoka's original character design. This idea was eventually discarded for being self-indulgent. The more nuanced portrayal of the clone troopers in The Clone Wars informed the decision to have Ahsoka attempt to not kill the clones that she was fighting. During filming, the voice cast had to be reminded not to allow their emotion from filming the series finale to affect their portrayals of the characters.

The final scene of "Victory and Death" involved a time skip, jumping forward to Darth Vader finding the destroyed cruiser and seeing what Ahsoka and Rex left behind, including the memorial to the clones and Ahsoka's lightsaber. The conception of having the final scene involving Vader had always been around, according to Filoni. The scene was designed to emphasize Vader's humanity, as the character had been portrayed as a hero and one of the leads throughout almost the entirety of The Clone Wars. As such, his eyes are visible through the helmet, just as they were in the original Star Wars film, and Vader's picking up Ahsoka's lightsaber is meant to mirror Anakin giving it to her earlier in the arc. The ending was changed through the course of production to ensure that Ahsoka and Rex's story was centered, as Anakin's story had previously been told in the prequel trilogy. The final scene was also designed to be devoid of color, to contrast the clone troopers, who often colorfully displayed individuality, and the all-white stormtroopers.

Various aspects of animation had changed between the series' original airing and the revival. The motion capture that was successfully used in the lightsaber duel in "The Phantom Apprentice" had previously been attempted for the third-season episode "Wookiee Hunt", but the process was too heavy and much of the footage went unused. The crew's experience utilizing previsualization on The Mandalorian, as well as technical advancements at Lucasfilm, particularly in its visual effects studio Industrial Light & Magic, allowed the use of the technology. The cinematography for the final season was meant to emulate the cameras used for the original Star Wars film, which had previously been done for Rebels and Star Wars Resistance, but not previous seasons of The Clone Wars. An unexpectedly high percentage of assets from the first six seasons of the series had to be remade due to being substantially lower-quality than new assets. Overall, the technological improvements and additional crew experience did not make the animation work easier, but it did open up new animation possibilities.

=== Casting ===
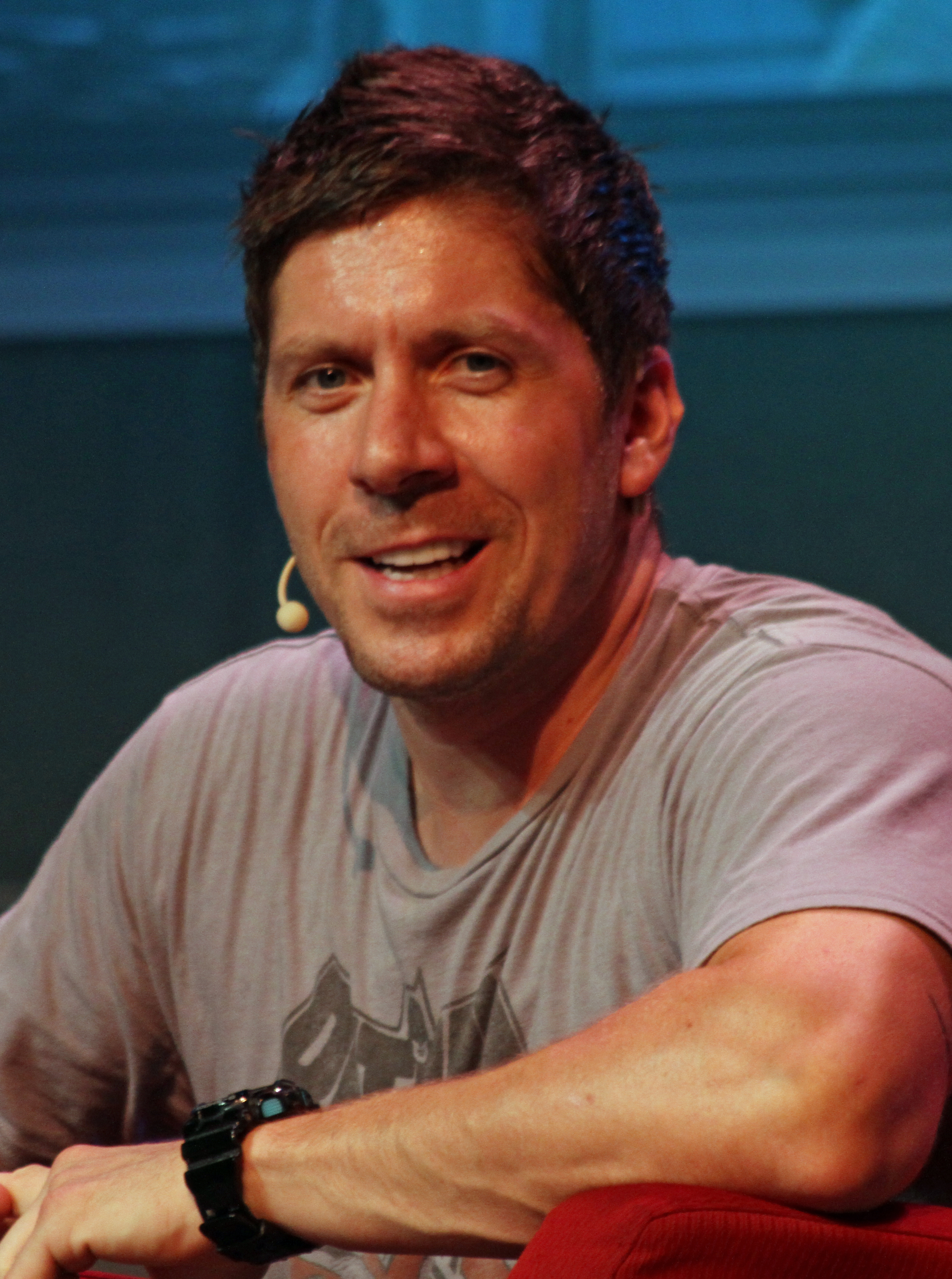
Ray Park reprised his role of Maul from The Phantom Menace through motion capture.

Numerous cast members from previous seasons of The Clone Wars returned for the final season and final arc, including Ashley Eckstein, Matt Lanter, James Arnold Taylor, Dee Bradley Baker, and Sam Witwer. Most of the main cast was informed that the series was to be revived in February 2018, a few months prior to the official announcement in July. Multiple cast members had to rewatch previous episodes to be able to match their previous performances, due to the length of time that had elapsed since The Clone Wars was last filmed, and some had voiced older versions of their characters in the interim and had to readjust their voices to the younger versions. Ray Stevenson and Sharmila Devar reprise their roles from Rebels, and Vanessa Marshall, who starred as Hera Syndulla in that series, cameos as Rook Kast in two episodes of the arc. Donald Faison, who portrayed a character in Resistance, cameos as a different character in "Old Friends Not Forgotten". This was the third of a string of cameos of Resistance cast members in the seventh season of The Clone Wars, as Bobby Moynihan and Josh Brener had cameoed in previous episodes. The voices of Silas Carson, Hayden Christensen, Samuel L. Jackson, and Ian McDiarmid are featured in "Shattered" through archival footage from Revenge of the Sith.

The lightsaber duel in "The Phantom Apprentice" utilized motion capture, requiring actors to physically portray Maul and Ahsoka. Maul's motion capture was performed by Ray Park, who originated the character in The Phantom Menace. Park met supervising director Dave Filoni at a Star Wars Celebration, and after discussing his collaboration with longtime Maul voice actor Sam Witwer in Solo: A Star Wars Story, it was decided that he would return again for The Clone Wars. Opposite Park, stunt actress Lauren Mary Kim portrayed Ahsoka. She was the first actress to physically portray Ahsoka, prior to the character's appearance in the second season of The Mandalorian, in which she was portrayed by Rosario Dawson. Filoni also voiced a droid named Cheep in the arc, following his voicing of similar droid Chopper in Rebels.

=== Opening sequence ===
The opening sequences of the episodes that make up the final arc feature several differences from other episodes in the series. For the final three episodes, Tom Kane does not perform the opening narration, for the only time in the series. The title card is red rather than the standard yellow; it had previously been red for the final episodes of the fourth season. The Lucasfilm logo used for the original Star Wars trilogy opens all four episodes. Rather than a philosophical lesson, the episode's number in the arc, followed by the episode title, is displayed in red. Unlike most other episodes, the Clone Wars theme is not played over the title card. Instead, "Old Friends Not Forgotten" uses the Star Wars theme by John Williams.

=== Music ===
Series composer Kevin Kiner composed the score for the arc. When starting work for the seventh season, Kiner had to listen to his own score from previous seasons to remember what he had done previously, as it had been so long since he had last worked on the series. In addition to the title card, John Williams's compositions for other Star Wars films are used much more frequently in this arc than in previous arcs in order to emphasize how special the arc was, in keeping with the series' philosophy of only using existing Star Wars music for "special moments". Parts of the score use elements of the score of Revenge of the Sith to indicate that a scene from the film, such as the opening scene of the battle over Coruscant, and a different scene from the series, such as the beginning of the titular siege of Mandalore, occur concurrently with each other in the franchise's chronology. Kiner used synthesizers in the arc, which was the first time that they were used in both the series and also the wider franchise, both of which tend to use orchestral scores. Kiner stated that despite this departure from the franchise's traditional music, he tried to keep the scope of the music grand, so that it still sounded like Star Wars. The opening music of "Victory and Death" features a live choir, which is also unusual for the series.

== Promotion and release ==
The announcement trailer for the seventh season, released on July 19, 2018, included a clip from "Old Friends Not Forgotten". Simultaneously, a poster was released featuring a clone trooper helmet painted to look like Ahsoka Tano's facial markings. Due to comments from the crew following the series' initial cancellation about story ideas that had at that time been discarded, it was widely expected upon the reveal of a final season that it would cover the siege of Mandalore. Additional footage from the arc was featured in two subsequent trailers, one released on April 13, 2019 at the Star Wars Celebration and the other on January 22, 2020. A TV spot for the final arc was released on April 14, 2020. Additionally, clips from "The Phantom Apprentice" and "Shattered" were released three days ahead of the release date of the episodes, on April 21 and 28, 2020 respectively. Ahsoka Tano voice actress Ashley Eckstein stated that numerous promotional activities, including a premiere and press screenings, had been planned, but were canceled due to the COVID-19 pandemic.

"Old Friends Not Forgotten" was released on April 17, 2020, "The Phantom Apprentice" was released on April 24, "Shattered" was released on May 1, and "Victory and Death" was released on May 4. All four episodes were released onto Disney+. Every episode of the seventh season was released on a Friday except for the final episode, which was released on Monday, May 4 in order to coincide with Star Wars Day.

== Critical reception ==
As a whole, the Siege of Mandalore arc was viewed as an excellent finale to Star Wars: The Clone Wars, and one of the best story arcs in the series, if not the best. IGN's Jesse Schedeen ranked it as not only the best arc or episode in the series, but the best animated Star Wars content ever, and wrote that it has "top-notch action, plenty of visual and auditory throwbacks to Episode III and a story that beautifully caps off Ahsoka, Maul and Rex's respective stories". Writing for the Ringer, Ben Lindbergh said that "the four-part denouement [...] delivered some of the series' most cinematic and emotionally affecting moments". Marissa Martinelli of Slate wrote that the series always respected the sometimes maligned prequel trilogy, and that the arc delivered "the ending that The Clone Wars always deserved, and a dignified close to an era of Star Wars that wasn't always so dignified".

"Old Friends Not Forgotten" was generally well-received. The reunion of Ahsoka and Anakin was highlighted for its strong emotional resonance, while the action at the end of the episode was praised for its dynamic fight scenes. Den of Geek's Megan Crouse described the battle as "impressively messy, no expense spared when it comes to oily, smoky missile trails or corpses slumped against the Mandalorians' massive quasi-brutalist architecture". The opening sequence received mixed reviews, with some criticism for implausibility, as well as praise for mirroring the film that served as a pilot for the series. Writing for Deseret News, Herb Scribner praised the episode opener as "an epic sequence that uses John Williams' excellent score. The high-quality visuals are beautiful, a clear reminder of what battles in Star Wars films and TV shows can be." The dialogue in the episode also received criticism. Sean Keane, writing for CNET, described the episode as "like Star Wars rock 'n' roll from beginning to end", and felt that it got the Siege of Mandalore off to an incredible start. Syfy's Bryan Young felt that it was possibly one of the best episodes of the series, and that it is "heartfelt, it's moving, and it's beautifully lit and rendered".

"The Phantom Apprentice" received critical acclaim. The episode was praised for effectively creating a sense of dread and foreboding, particularly in its use of dramatic irony through the audience's knowledge of the events of Revenge of the Sith. The use of Maul was also a point of praise, particularly in how his foresight contributed to the character's depth. Gizmodo's James Whitbrook felt that turning "Maul into this sort of quasi-audience surrogate—not knowledgeable through access to the text, but vaguely aware through the fog of foresight—makes for an incredibly compelling turn for the character". The motion-captured lightsaber duel between Ahsoka and Maul was also well received. Dylan Roth, writing for Digital Trends, described the motion-capture process as giving the fight "a fluidity and gravity lacking in most of the show's other battles". Empire's Ben Travis praised the "acrobatic footwork and use of the Force in impressively imaginative ways", and stated that it was the closest the series got to a live-action duel.

"Shattered" was generally well-received. The tension in the first part of the episode was widely praised, as was Kevin Kiner's score for contributing to that sense of tension. Kevin Johnson, writing for The A.V. Club, said that in the first half, "a sense of dread fills the episode, partly because of that incredible score, but partly because the specific rhythms of the first half "Shattered" resembles that of the opening minutes of a horror film". The episode's portrayal of Order 66 was praised for its emotional weight, as well as for its intersection with Revenge of the Sith. Some reviewers felt that the Order 66 sequence in the episode surpassed the depiction of the event in Revenge of the Sith because it humanized the clone troopers and treated them as equal victims of Order 66 rather than simply as perpetrators, including Dais Johnston of Inverse, who said that the episode positioned "the clones not as weapons turned against the Jedi but as individuals who felt as betrayed as the Jedi themselves". The fight scene with Maul and the clone troopers was also praised for its brutality and the entertainment value of the slaughter.

"Victory and Death" received critical acclaim. A particular point of praise was the episode showcasing Ahsoka's morality by having her not kill the clones, with the character moment being considered especially meaningful because of her turbulent relationship with the Jedi. The dark tone and tragic ending of the episode were also praised, and seen as exemplifying the pointlessness of the titular Clone Wars. Syfy's Brian Silliman thought the episode was "an insanely poetic finish to this series that has been about one giant war, and it is here that both the characters and the audience see how futile it all was". Reviewers appreciated the animation of the episode, finding that the scale and quality of the animation made the episode visually stunning and gave it a cinematic feel. The final scene was especially acclaimed for its use of color and silence to emphasize visual storytelling, and for the poignance of seeing the now fallen Anakin reflecting on his former Padawan.
