= Lego Star Wars: Droid Tales =

Lego Star Wars television mini-series

- Genre: Action comedy; Science fiction
- Based on: Star Wars by George Lucas
- Developed by: Carrie Beck; Jason Cosler; Jake Blais; Jakob Liesenfeld; Jens Kronvold Frederiksen; John McCormack; Keith Malone; Kurt Kristiansen; Mathew Steven Boyle
- Country of origin: United States
- No. of seasons: 1
- No. of episodes: 5

Production
- Executive producers: Torsten Jacobson; Jill Wilfert; Erik Wilstrup; Michael Price
- Producer: Irene Sparre
- Running time: 25 minutes
- Production companies: Wil Film ApS; Lucasfilm; Lucasfilm Animation; The Lego Group

Original release
- Network: Disney XD
- Release: July 6 – November 2, 2015

Related
- Lego Star Wars: The Yoda Chronicles

Lego Star Wars: Droid Tales is a five-part Lego Star Wars animated television mini-series that premiered on Disney XD on July 6, 2015. It is an animated comedy adventure series depicting the stories and characters from the Star Wars saga.

== Plot ==
In the aftermath of Return of the Jedi, the rebels celebrate their victory against the Galactic Empire by having C-3PO and R2-D2 share their previous encounters throughout the Clone Wars, their affiliation with the Ghost crew from Star Wars Rebels, and their activism against the Galactic Empire. During this time, C-3PO pursues a mysterious person who has abducted R2-D2 which is later revealed to be Lando Calrissian. However, 3PO, R2 and Chewbacca (who was enlisted by 3PO to help find R2) are captured by General Veers and a few surviving Stormtroopers but the trio manage to escape with the help of Admiral Ackbar and return to Endor to celebrate with their friends.

== Episodes ==
No.	Title	Directed by	Written by	Original release date	Viewers (millions)
1	"Exit From Endor"	Michael Hegner	Michael Price	July 6, 2015	0.56
As the Rebels clean up on Endor after celebrating the fall of the Galactic Empire, they convince C-3PO to tell them the stories of The Phantom Menace and Attack of the Clones. His story is interrupted when he realizes R2-D2 is being kidnapped by a hooded figure, who takes off in Admiral Ackbar's new ship the Daisy Mae, and C-3PO and Ackbar give chase.
2	"Crisis on Coruscant"	Martin Skov	Michael Price	August 24, 2015	0.49
C-3PO tracks the Daisy Mae to Coruscant and reminisces about its time as the Capitol during the Clone Wars. Ackbar finds the Daisy Mae, while C-3PO asks around for help finding R2-D2, being convinced to tell the story of Revenge of the Sith. C-3PO spots R2 in surveillance footage on a shuttle bound for Tatooine and books a flight there.
3	"Mission to Mos Eisley"	Michael Hegner	Matty Smith	September 7, 2015	0.51
While flying to Tatooine, C-3PO meets a young Twi'lek who collects Rebel trading cards, telling about his encounter with the crew of the Ghost in the Star Wars Rebels episode "Droids in Distress". Upon arriving at Mos Eisley, he finds the cantina is now a safe haven for droids hiding from Jawas and tells them the story of A New Hope. Leaving the cantina, he spots the hooded figure and R2-D2 leaving in a gunship and enlists Chewbacca's help in pursuing them aboard the Millennium Falcon.
4	"Flight of the Falcon"	Martin Skov	Mick Kelly	October 12, 2015	0.42
R2-D2 broadcasts his coordinates to C-3PO, and they follow the gunship to Geonosis. While traveling, C-3PO recalls the story of The Empire Strikes Back to copilot Nien Nunb. On Geonosis, the group finds R2-D2 at the old Battle Droid factory, and discover the hooded figure is Lando Calrissian, who wanted to sell the spare parts so he could restart his mining business and asked R2-D2 to interpret. However, General Veers reveals himself, planning to use the factory to rebuild the Separatist Droid Army and restore the Empire.
5	"Gambit on Geonosis"	Michael Hegner	Michael Price	November 2, 2015	0.51
While R2-D2 frees himself, C-3PO distracts their captors with the story of Return of the Jedi. R2-D2 escapes and takes control of the Millennium Falcon, opening an escape route for the others. Veers attempts to create a giant Battle Droid to stop them, but Admiral Ackbar arrives in the Daisy Mae to destroy it. The heroes all return to Endor to continue the celebration.

== Voice cast ==
- Eric Bauza – Luke Skywalker, FA-4 Droid Pilot, Waiter, Stormtrooper No. 2
- Michael Benyaer – Kanan Jarrus
- Michael Daingerfield – Han Solo, Bossk, Stormtrooper No. 1
- Anthony Daniels – C-3PO
- Trevor Devall – Admiral Ackbar, Chancellor / Emperor Palpatine / Darth Sidious, Jar Jar Binks, Jango Fett, Boba Fett, TionMedon, Garbagedroid No. 2, Battledroid No. 1, Nien Nunb
- Paul Dobson – Ki-Adi-Mundi
- Heather Doerksen – Princess Leia Organa, Shmi Skywalker
- Michael Donovan – Old Obi-Wan Kenobi, Count Dooku, Owen Lars, Captain Panaka, Pilot, Poggle the Lesser, Spaceport Announcer
- Brian Drummond – Watto, Garazeb "Zeb" Orrelios, Admiral Motti
- Andrew Francis – Senator Bail Organa
- Adrian Holmes – Mace Windu, Red Guard No. 1
- Bronwen Holmes – Young Anakin Skywalker
- Tom Kane – Yoda, narrator, Qui-Gon Jinn, Garbagedroid No. 1, Pit Droid, Officer
- Alan Marriott – Agent Kallus
- Kirby Morrow – Anakin Skywalker, General Grievous, Red Guard No. 2, Ithorian Customer
- Colin Murdock – General Veers, Rebel Officer
- Montana Norberg – Queen / Senator Padmé Amidala
- Nicole Oliver – Hera Syndulla
- Adrian Petriw – Ezra Bridger
- Darien Provost – Twi'lek Kid
- Elysia Rotaru – Sabine Wren
- Matt Sloan – Darth Vader, Stormtrooper
- Lee Tockar – Darth Maul, Nute Gunray, Vizago, Amda Wabo
- Samuel Vincent – Young Obi-Wan Kenobi, Garbagedroid No. 3, Ticketdroid, Battledroid No. 2
- Billy Dee Williams – Lando Calrissian

== Broadcast ==
Lego Star Wars: Droid Tales premiered on August 21, 2015, on Disney XD in Australia and New Zealand.

== Home media ==
The whole series was released on DVD, titled Lego Star Wars: Droid Tales, on March 1, 2016, by Walt Disney Studios Home Entertainment. The series has also been released on the Google Play store at the same time as the DVD release.

The series is also available on the Disney+ streaming service, which launched on November 12, 2019.

== Print sources ==
- Daniels, Anthony (2019). I Am C-3PO: The Inside Story (Hardback ed.). London: DK. ISBN 9780241357606.
