= Captain Rex =

Fictional Star Wars character

Rex CT-7567
- Star Wars character
- Captain Rex in season four of The Clone Wars
- First appearance: The Clone Wars film (2008)
- Created by: George Lucas and Dave Filoni
- Voiced by: Dee Bradley Baker (animated); Temuera Morrison (Ahsoka)

In-universe information
- Full name: CT-7567
- Nickname: Rex
- Occupation: Clone trooper of the Grand Army of the Republic; Captain and commander in the Rebel Alliance
- Affiliation: Galactic Republic; 501st Legion; Rebel Alliance

Captain Rex (designation number CT-7567 (Note: In August 2011, the official Star Wars Databank entry for Captain Rex gave his designation number as CC-7567. The designation CT-7567 is stated in dialogue in the episodes "Darkness on Umbara" and "The General" and is given in a subsequent version of the Databank entry.)) is a fictional character in the Star Wars franchise created by George Lucas. He was introduced as a main character in the animated The Clone Wars 2008 film and the related television series of the same name. Rex is a clone trooper of the Grand Army of the Republic, cloned from the Mandalorian bounty hunter Jango Fett, and serves the Galactic Republic under the command of Jedi General Anakin Skywalker and Jedi Commander Ahsoka Tano. Since his introduction in The Clone Wars, he has also appeared in the 2014 Star Wars Rebels television series, the 2021 Star Wars: The Bad Batch television series, the 2022 Tales of the Jedi television series, the 2026 video game Star Wars Zero Company, and various spin-off media. Like all clone troopers in The Clone Wars, Rebels, The Bad Batch, Tales of the Jedi, and Zero Company, Rex is voiced by Dee Bradley Baker. In Ahsoka, Rex made his live-action debut in the episode "Part Five: Shadow Warrior", voiced by Temuera Morrison in sequences set during the Clone Wars.

He is physically distinguished from other clone troopers by his close shaved blond hair, and he is identified by blue markings on his armor and by stylized hawk eyes (also known as jaig eyes in-universe) painted on his helmet. Rex was also distinguished by his use of twin DC-17 blaster pistols in combat. He is described as a reliable and exemplary soldier, considered by Anakin to be his "first-in-command". Rex is characterized as believing it is his duty to not only carry out orders but also to protect the men under his command; however, his belief in the Republic wavers and changes over the course of the series.

Initial development for The Clone Wars film chose Alpha-17, featured in Star Wars: Republic, to be the primary clone trooper character. However, Lucas felt this created too much alliteration with the existing principal cast, and a new character was created instead. Rex was developed as the central personality to which the troopers around him aspired and featured in story arcs exploring his character development. Rex became a fan favorite, consistently placing in fan polls and Star Wars character ranking lists.

== Creation and development ==
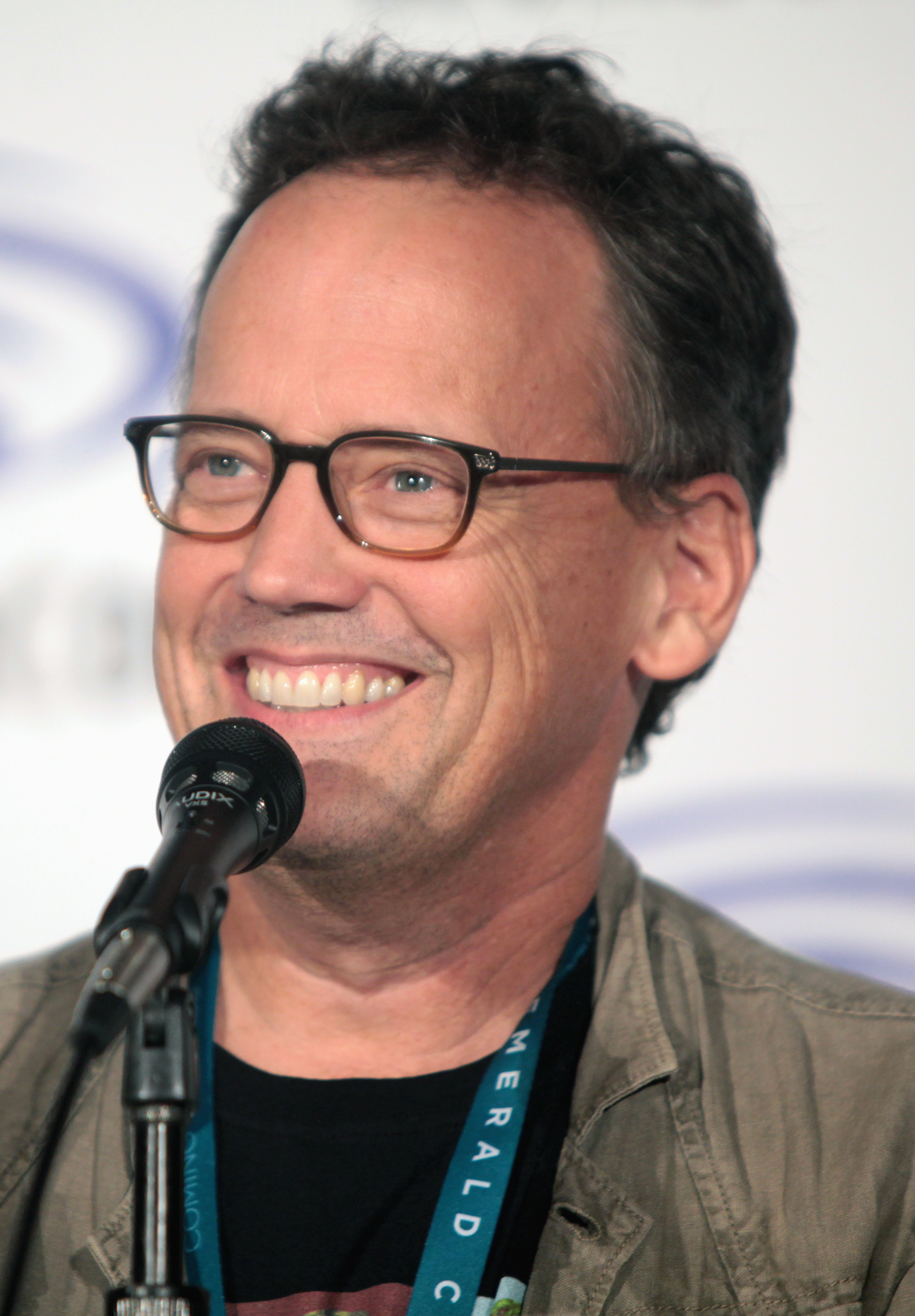
Baker (pictured) and Filoni approached Rex as the central character type to which the clones around him aspired.

Initial development for The Clone Wars film chose Alpha-17, featured in the Star Wars: Republic comic, to be the principal clone trooper character. However, because Anakin Skywalker, Ahsoka Tano, and R2-D2 (Artoo) were also principal characters, Star Wars creator George Lucas felt Alpha's name created too much alliteration between the main cast, and a new character, Captain Rex, was created instead. The name "Rex" was chosen by Lucas. Previously, the name Captain Rex was used for the error-prone rookie droid pilot RX-24 of Star Tours, who replaced an earlier concept of an unpredictable and risk-taking Clone Wars veteran. (Note: RX-24 also appears in Star Wars Rebels, along with Captain Rex. Disney acknowledged RX-24's nickname by renaming him R-3X for the Disney Parks themed area Star Wars: Galaxy's Edge.)

Voice actor Dee Bradley Baker voices every clone trooper in The Clone Wars, including Rex. To differentiate the characters, Baker considered the personality traits of every clone, choosing one or two adjectives for each, and recorded each character separately. To aid with the vocal performance, Baker and supervising director Dave Filoni developed a "clone triangle" that arranged the characters by personality. Rex, characterized as the central personality type to which the other clones aspired, was placed in the center, and the other clones, who represented an excess of certain traits relative to Rex, were placed around the edges of the triangle.

Filoni wished most for the series to address the fates of Rex and Ahsoka because they do not appear in Star Wars: Episode III – Revenge of the Sith, which was released before The Clone Wars but is set after the series' timeline. In April 2011, he hinted that the two characters' stories were possibly connected and remarked: "A lot of people say they want to know more about [Ahsoka], and along with that goes Rex." He also voiced the production team's conscious effort to write story arcs for Rex: "I think one of the other things is we have such a great development of Rex that we really want to keep telling Rex's story and things centered around Rex."

== Characterization and appearance ==
The official Star Wars Databank describes Rex as a "no-nonsense, by the book" and "exemplary clone trooper, brave under fire and dedicated to the men serving under him" who must adjust to his "maverick" ,"headstrong" and "brazen" Jedi commanding officers. His training is described as having instilled a belief that a soldier's highest calling is duty, though his belief wavers over the course of the Clone Wars and he comes to question the purpose of the conflict. The entry characterized Rex as coming to admire and even imitate Anakin Skywalker's improvisation and willingness to bend rules. In "Darkness on Umbara", Anakin describes Rex as his "first-in-command" and second-to-none in loyalty or capability.

Rex's later helmet design (right) is a hybrid of his original helmet (left) and the regular Episode III clone trooper helmet (center).

Rex is distinguished by close-shaved blond hair (where most other clones have dark hair) and stylized hawk eyes adorning his helmets; like all members of the 501st, his armor bears blue markings. Later in the series, Rex's armor bears tally marks, representing kills, and Filoni felt it communicated that Rex "is becoming something of a little legend" because he is "a long term survivor of the Clone Wars". He also bears a scar on his chin in homage to actor Harrison Ford, who played Han Solo in the original trilogy.

In season four of the show, Rex begins wearing a modified helmet composed of elements from both the older Episode II-style and the newer Episode III-style designs. Rex's new helmet uses the Episode III-style design as a base and has the Episode II-style visor in place of the Episode III-style visor, requiring some elements to be modified to fit. Filoni developed an in-universe backstory for the design and felt that Rex "trying to wear the same armor" by welding together a hybrid version was a good character trait that added to his uniqueness. Filoni also characterized this specialized helmet and "hodgepodge of old gear and new gear" as indicative of Rex's distrust in the quality of the new armor and Rex's belief that with "classic stuff, the craftsmanship is a little better". Rex continues to wear his helmet and parts of his clone trooper armor in his Rebels appearances.

== Appearances ==
=== Star Wars: The Clone Wars ===
Introduced in The Clone Wars animated film and featured throughout the television series of the same name, Captain Rex, designation number CT-7567, is the commanding officer of Torrent Company within the 501st Legion under the command of Jedi General Anakin Skywalker and Jedi Padawan Commander Ahsoka Tano. He fights as a soldier of the Grand Army of the Republic in numerous campaigns of the Clone Wars against the Separatist battle droid army. As a clone trooper, he was cloned on Kamino from bounty hunter Jango Fett and ages at an accelerated rate, aging twenty years in ten years. As Anakin's Clone Captain, he goes on many missions with Anakin and his Padawan Ahsoka Tano, sharing Anakin's quick-thinking skills and recklessness at times.

In a season four story arc, the 501st Legion is temporarily led by Jedi General Pong Krell. In the face of Krell's callousness toward clone lives and refusal to treat the troopers as individuals instead of numbered units, Rex is caught between his duty to follow Krell's orders and his responsibility to protect his men. Despite growing discontent in the ranks and calls for dissent from Fives, Rex does not openly defy Krell. However, Rex supports a mission led by Fives that is expressly forbidden by Krell but saves numerous clone trooper lives. After orders causes the 501st Legion and the 212th Attack Battalion to unknowingly attack one another, Rex leads the troopers to arrest Krell, who reveals he has turned to the dark side, admits he has been deliberately sabotaging the clones, and is later executed by clone trooper Dogma. Rex is also involved in a season six story arc centering on a conspiracy regarding the clone troopers. Fives discovers that inhibitor chips are secretly implanted into the clone troopers' brains and can be used to turn them against the Jedi. He reveals this to Rex before he dies.

Rex is a principal character in the Bad Batch story arc, an unfinished story arc released as completed animatics; the arc was released in completed form as part of the seventh season of The Clone Wars, released on Disney+ in 2020. Shortly after Fives' death, Rex discovers a transmission from Echo, previously thought to have been killed in action, and leads a successful mission to rescue him, with help from Anakin and Clone Force 99 (aka "the Bad Batch"), a squad of clone troopers with genetic mutations. Rex also appears in the final story arc of the series, the Siege of Mandalore, set during Revenge of the Sith. After being promoted to commander, he leads half of the 501st Legion reassigned to Ahsoka, who previously relinquished command upon leaving the Jedi Order, into an assault of Mandalore, with the intent of capturing the former Rogue Sith Darth Maul. Though the assault is successful and Maul's forces are defeated, with Maul himself captured, Palpatine, who has revealed himself as Darth Sidious, issues Order 66, causing Ahsoka's clone troopers to turn on her, including Rex; however, Rex is able to resist the order long enough to warn Ahsoka. As a result, Ahsoka escapes and manages to remove Rex's chip, restoring his free will. For his treachery against the Republic, ARC Trooper Jesse threatens to demote Commander Rex to captain and orders his execution. Rex and Ahsoka manage to escape the cruiser they are on before it crashes into the planet below. After the impact, Rex and Ahsoka bury Jesse and the dead clones in a mass grave, marking it with the helmets of the fallen clones. The pair then fake their deaths and go their separate ways.

=== Star Wars Rebels ===
An aging Rex as he appears in the second season of Star Wars Rebels.

Rex was added to the main cast of Star Wars Rebels television series, set fifteen years after The Clone Wars, in the second season. Now seemingly a much older man due to accelerated aging, Rex lives with fellow clone troopers Commander Wolffe and Captain Gregor. In the episode "The Lost Commanders", the three are sought by the Ghost crew upon instructions from Ahsoka, and they ask the troopers for help in establishing a new rebel base. Though the three have had their inhibitor chips removed, allowing them to ignore Order 66, former Padawan Kanan Jarrus initially distrusts them. Wolffe, fearing the consequences for aiding rebels and Jedi, contacts the Galactic Empire to protect the clones. However, Rex convinces Wolffe the rebels can be trusted and repels the Empire, in turn earning Kanan's trust. Rex leaves Wolffe and Gregor to join the Rebel Alliance and to fight alongside the Ghost crew and Ahsoka against the Empire. In the epilogue of the series finale "Family Reunion - and Farewell", it is revealed that he was promoted to commander again and fought with Hera at the Battle of Endor that ended with the death of his former Jedi General.

=== Star Wars: The Bad Batch ===
Rex appears in The Bad Batch animated series, which continues the story of the eponymous clone trooper team in the immediate aftermath of The Clone Wars. He is first mentioned in the episode "Cut and Run" by clone deserter Cut Lawquane, whom Rex visited shortly after the events of Order 66. Rex told Cut about the inhibitor chips that caused regular clones to turn on the Jedi, and Cut relays this information to the Bad Batch when they visit him the following day. In the episode "Decommissioned", sisters Trace and Rafa Martez have a run-in with the Bad Batch on Corellia while attempting to retrieve data from a tactical droid for Rex. After their mission, the sisters inform Rex that the Bad Batch have rebelled against the Empire and tell him how to find them. In the following episode, "Battle Scars", Rex tracks down and reunites with the Bad Batch, but is alarmed to learn they have not removed their chips like he did. He takes them to a crashed cruiser on Bracca to use its medical bay, but during their mission, one of the Bad Batch members, Wrecker's, chip activates and he attacks them. Rex helps the others subdue Wrecker, after which the Bad Batch have their chips removed and they part ways with Rex. He later returns in the episode "War-Mantle" as a hologram, where he asks the Bad Batch to investigate a distress signal sent by Captain Gregor from Daro.

Rex appears in the second season, revealed to have been organizing an underground network of rogue clone troopers with the help of other clones and sympathetic senators.

Rex makes an appearance in episodes six and seven, "Infiltration" and "Extraction", of the third season.

=== Tales of the Jedi ===
Rex appears in Tales of the Jedi animated series. He helps Anakin train Ahsoka with his troopers in the episode Practice makes Perfect and has a non-speaking cameo in Resolve having flown Ahsoka to Naboo to attend Padmé Amidala's funeral.

=== Ahsoka ===
Rex made his first live action appearance in the Ahsoka episode "Part Five: Shadow Warrior", during the Clone Wars flashback sequences.

=== In other media ===
Since his introduction in The Clone Wars, Rex has also appeared in comics, novels, and video games of the Star Wars Expanded Universe, also known as Star Wars Legends.

In March 2016, Filoni supported the former fan theory of Rex being the older member of Han Solo's raiding party, previously known in Legends continuity as Nik Sant, on Endor in Return of the Jedi. In August 2017, writer Steven Melching shared concept art for the fourth season of Star Wars Rebels, and it was reported as a confirmation of this theory. Melching later clarified that at that time he was not aware if Rex and Sant are the same character, stating that due to the progression of the series, Rex's costume would naturally come to resemble those worn by Rebel Alliance commandos in Return of the Jedi. Rebels ultimately did not state whether Rex and Nik Sant are the same character, which Filoni later said was a purposeful decision to allow either possibility, although the animated web series Star Wars Forces of Destiny would ultimately display Rex in place of Sant in that series' animation style.

Rex makes an appearance in the turn-based tactics game Star Wars Zero Company. He contacts the titular mercenary group's leader Hawks one year after the formation of the Empire offering to remove Zero Company member and clone trooper Trick's inhibitor chip. While Trick is sent to Ord Mantell to have his chip surgically removed by the Bad Batch, the group assists Rex with sabotaging Imperial black sites as well as rescuing clones sympathetic to his underground network and aiding the local resistance on Umbara. After Trick is freed from his chip and rejoins the group, Zero Company assists Rex again in sabotaging another black site where they learn that Umbarans were captured and experimented on as part of Project Blackstaff, led by clone CT-4646 in pursuit of a more effective inhibitor chip designed to strip clones entirely of their free will, while also revealing that his own chip was removed. Trick executes him out of disgust and the realization that CT-4646's actions was entirely of his own accord, while Rex continues to aid Zero Company by directing freed clone troopers to the group as potential recruits.

== Merchandise ==
Rex was the featured character for the 2010 Star Wars merchandise trade dress created by Pilot Studio. The concept initially featured Anakin Skywalker, but discussions of other characters best suited to representing the brand led to Rex, "a strong, courageous character who is clearly one of the heroes of The Clone Wars". Pilot Studio was initially reluctant to use Rex because his helmet did not allow for eye contact, an emphasized element in the initial trade dress concept. In 2020, Hot Toys produced a sixth scale action figure of Rex, featuring a head sculpt, which is modeled after Temuera Morrison, and a second helmet.

== Reception ==
Captain Rex became a favorite among fans. Filoni noted that while older fans were excited to see Grand Moff Tarkin and Chewbacca appear in the series, younger fans appeared to prefer characters like Rex. Baker was surprised Rex became well-liked because the clone troopers were not established as distinct characters in the films.

Rex was ranked 36 in IGN's Top 100 Star Wars characters, where he was described as having a "silly name" but "bad ass". His ability to evolve and adapt as a character and as a soldier was noted, especially his change from scorn to sympathy toward a clone trooper deserter. Eric Goldman felt that the Rebels reunion between Rex and Ahsoka was a poignant moment and the emotional highlight of "Relics of the Old Republic". He also noted that Rex's reintroduction and Ahsoka's complete trust in him raised more questions about Rex in the time between The Clone Wars and Rebels.
