= Hera Syndulla =

Fictional character in the Star Wars franchise

- Star Wars character
- Hera Syndulla as seen in Rebels.
- First appearance: "The Machine in the Ghost"; Rebels; (2014)
- Created by: Dave Filoni; Simon Kinberg; Carrie Beck
- Voiced by: Vanessa Marshall
- Portrayed by: Mary Elizabeth Winstead

In-universe information
- Full name: Hera Syndulla
- Alias: Spectre 2
- Species: Twi'lek
- Gender: Female
- Titles: Captain (Ghost, Phoenix Squadron); General (Rebel Alliance)
- Affiliation: Ghost crew: Kanan Jarrus; Zeb Orrelios; Ezra Bridger; Chopper; Captain Rex; Rebel Alliance; Phoenix Squadron; New Republic
- Family: Cham Syndulla (father); Eleni Syndulla (mother)
- Significant other: Kanan Jarrus
- Children: Jacen Syndulla (son)

General Hera Syndulla is a fictional character in the Star Wars franchise, voiced by Vanessa Marshall in the animated series Star Wars Rebels, The Freemaker Adventures, Forces of Destiny, and The Bad Batch, and the video game Star Wars: Squadrons, and portrayed by Mary Elizabeth Winstead in the live-action miniseries Ahsoka. The Twi'lek daughter of Ryloth freedom fighter Cham Syndulla, and widowed lover of Jedi knight Kanan Jarrus/Caleb Dume, with whom she has a son, Jacen Syndulla, General Syndulla is an expert pilot and central figure in the formation of the Rebel Alliance in its fight against the Galactic Empire after leading a small rebel insurgency on the planet of Lothal that gained the attention of Senator Bail Organa.

Marshall's portrayal of Hera Syndulla has received a universally positive critical reception.

== Creation and development ==
The character of Hera Syndulla was first created in 2014 for the animated television show Star Wars Rebels. The character was first revealed on February 20, 2014 with the announcement that she would be voiced by Vanessa Marshall in a video posted to the Star Wars YouTube channel. The character was named after the Greek goddess of marriage, women and family Hera, meaning "protector". When Marshall was auditioning for the role, Star Wars Rebels was using a secret title but Marshall saw the character "described as a pilot who wanted to see the 'tyranny' fall" and inserted Star Wars elements like the Empire into the character description when she was auditioning.

Syndulla's outfit in Rebels was designed to imitate a classic X-Wing pilot flight outfit that is mixed with elements from World War II-era pilot gear such as a leather shoulder assembly and flight goggles. For season 3 of Rebels, Hera underwent a minor redesign with more texturing added to the character model and adding a patch to signify her position as Phoenix Leader in the Rebellion's Phoenix Squadron.

== Character themes ==
=== Leadership ===
Hera's leadership style is a more mature and emotionally intelligent one. The Rebels episode "Homecoming" deals with how Hera’s sense of duty to the whole galaxy conflicts with her father’s commitment to their home planet Ryloth. She convinces her father Cham Syndulla to widen his perspective and fight for the freedom of other planets that are not Ryloth.

=== Motherhood ===
Hera Syndulla serves in a mother-figure role to the rest of the Ghost Crew, mentoring them and helping to hold the group together when they would otherwise fall apart. In particular, she forms a motherly bond with Ezra Bridger who was orphaned as a child.

In 1 BBY, Syndulla became a mother to son Jacen Syndulla with the late Jedi Knight Kanan Jarrus.

== Appearances ==
=== Film ===
==== Rogue One: A Star Wars Story (2016) ====
Hera Syndulla is mentioned in Rogue One: A Star Wars Story on the Rebel Alliance's Yavin IV base when an announcer on the base intercom summons "General Syndulla" to the briefing room. Dave Filoni confirmed that it was indeed referencing Hera rather than her father. Additionally, Hera's droid Chopper is briefly seen in the background.

=== Television ===
==== Star Wars Rebels (2014-2018) ====
Syndulla is a lead character in Rebels during its four seasons.

==== Star Wars: The Bad Batch (2021) ====
A 10-year-old Hera Syndulla appears in the eleventh and twelfth episodes from the first season of The Bad Batch titled "Devil's Deal" and "Rescue on Ryloth". Syndulla is again voiced by Vanessa Marshall. However, unlike the character's American accent in Rebels, the younger Hera has a French accent from living on her native planet Ryloth. Previously in Rebels, Syndulla would slip into a French accent when she is emotional such as when arguing with her father Cham. Syndulla's dysfunctional astromech droid C1-10P ("Chopper"), who was rescued by Hera from a crashed Y-Wing ship during the Clone Wars on Ryloth, is featured alongside a young Syndulla.

==== Ahsoka (2023-present) ====
Mary Elizabeth Winstead as Syndulla in Ahsoka.

Hera Syndulla is portrayed in live-action for the first time by Mary Elizabeth Winstead in the 2023 series Ahsoka. The casting of Winstead was first reported in December 2022 and was formally confirmed at Star Wars Celebration in April 2023. Winstead said that, in Ahsoka, Hera "is a general and she has become some kind of a legend just from all the work she's done fighting on behalf of the Rebellion". In 9 ABY, when the Ahsoka series is set, General Hera Syndulla is a military leader in the New Republic and informs Chancellor Mon Mothma that the Republic must prepare for the return of Grand Admiral Thrawn from Peridea.

=== Video games ===
==== Star Wars: Galaxy of Heroes (2015) ====
Syndulla is a playable character in the free-to-play turn-based mobile role-playing game Star Wars: Galaxy of Heroes, released on iOS and Android in 2015. She, along with several other Rebels characters, were added into the game in 2017 as part of the new "Phoenix" faction. She is a support character who leads fellow Phoenix characters and is well known for allowing them to share their passive abilities as leader.

==== Star Wars: Force Arena (2017) ====
Syndulla is also a playable Light Side leader character for the Rebel Alliance faction in the mobile card-powered MOBA game Star Wars: Force Arena, and was immediately available to unlock and play as during the game's worldwide launch in 2017. She is a ranged leader whose special ability is to call in a bombing run with the Ghost to deal area of effect damage.

==== Star Wars: Squadrons (2020) ====
Syndulla is featured in the 2020 EA flight-combat video game Star Wars: Squadrons, set in the years following Return of the Jedi. In Squadrons, Syndulla is a Rebel General in charge of the Starhawk Project, tasked with creating a fleet of Starhawk ships with super-powerful tractor beams.

=== Literature ===
==== Star Wars: A New Dawn (2014) ====
The 2014 prequel novel A New Dawn follows Kanan Jarrus after Order 66 as he makes allies with Hera Syndulla before the events of Rebels.

==== Star Wars: Alphabet Squadron (2019) ====
In the novel Alphabet Squadron, set shortly after Return of the Jedi, Hera serves as a general in the New Republic and oversees the starfighter group known as Alphabet Squadron.

== Reception ==
In 2022, Entertainment Weekly placed Hera Syndulla at 27 on their list of top 100 Star Wars characters.
