= Star Wars Forces of Destiny =

Animated web series

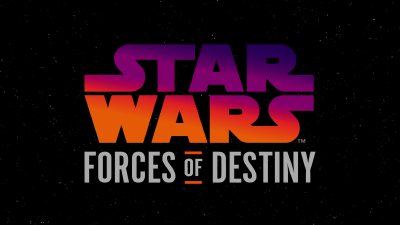
- Genre: Science fiction; Action; Adventure; Anthology
- Created by: Dave Filoni; Carrie Beck; Jennifer Muro
- Based on: Star Wars by: George Lucas
- Developed by: Dave Filoni
- Written by: Jennifer Muro; Nicole Dubuc
- Directed by: Brad Rau
- Voices of: Ashley Eckstein; Felicity Jones; Vanessa Marshall; Daisy Ridley; Tiya Sircar; Catherine Taber; Shelby Young; Helen Sadler; Kelly Marie Tran; Olivia Hack
- Narrated by: Lupita Nyong'o
- Composer: Ryan Shore
- Country of origin: United States
- Original language: English
- No. of seasons: 2
- No. of episodes: 32

Production
- Executive producers: Carrie Beck; Dave Filoni
- Producer: Jacqueline Lopez
- Running time: 2–3 minutes
- Production companies: Lucasfilm; Lucasfilm Animation; Ghostbot

Original release
- Network: YouTube
- Release: July 3, 2017 – May 25, 2018

Related
- Star Wars: Clone Wars

Star Wars Forces of Destiny is a 2D animated web series by Lucasfilm Animation released through Lucasfilm's YouTube channel. Set across multiple eras of the Star Wars franchise, it is a collection of two- to three-minute shorts mostly centering on female characters featured in previous Star Wars installments. The series premiered on July 3, 2017, beginning the daily release of a set of eight episodes; these episodes subsequently began broadcasting on Disney Channel on July 9. An additional eight episodes were released in late 2017, and the second season of sixteen episodes was released in 2018.

First announced and presented in April 2017 during Star Wars Celebration Orlando, Forces of Destiny is part of a franchise expansion initiative by Disney Consumer Products and Interactive Media and includes a companion toy line by Hasbro and a series of youth-aimed books. The series is the first 2D animated series produced by Lucasfilm since the 2003 Star Wars: Clone Wars series and the first 2D project by Lucasfilm Animation.

== Premise ==
The animated micro-series anthology mostly focuses on female characters such as Princess Leia Organa, Sabine Wren, Jyn Erso, Rose Tico, Ahsoka Tano, Qi'ra, Padmé Amidala, Hera Syndulla, and Rey.

== Cast and characters ==
- Ashley Eckstein as Ahsoka Tano
- Olivia Hack as Qi'ra
- Felicity Jones (season 1) and Helen Sadler (season 2) as Jyn Erso
- Vanessa Marshall as Hera Syndulla
- Lupita Nyong'o as Maz Kanata
- Daisy Ridley as Rey
- Tiya Sircar as Sabine Wren
- Catherine Taber as Padmé Amidala
- Gina Torres as Ketsu Onyo
- Kelly Marie Tran as Rose Tico
- Shelby Young as Princess Leia Organa

Matt Lanter and Jim Cummings reprised the roles of Jedi Knight Anakin Skywalker and space pirate Hondo Ohnaka from The Clone Wars and Rebels. Tom Kane returned as Jedi Master Yoda from The Clone Wars, while Taylor Gray and Ritesh Rajan reprised the roles of Jedi Padawan Ezra Bridger and Mandalorian warrior Tristan Wren from Rebels.

Film actor John Boyega returned as defected First Order stormtrooper Finn, with Mark Hamill returning as Luke Skywalker and Anthony Daniels once again providing the voice of protocol droid C-3PO.

Other characters to appear include smugglers Han Solo and Chewbacca, the ewok Wicket W. Warrick, and droids R2-D2, BB-8 and Chopper.

== Production ==
Forces of Destiny was announced on April 12, 2017, and a special preview of the series presented at Star Wars Celebration Orlando on April 14. The series is the first 2D animated series produced by Lucasfilm since the 2003 Clone Wars series and the first 2D animation project created by Lucasfilm Animation; previous 2D animated series such as Ewoks, Droids, and early installments of Clone Wars were created before the formation of the studio. The series is part of Disney Consumer Products and Interactive Media's franchise expansion initiative.

Forces of Destiny was created as a series of web shorts because it was felt to better appeal to children's watching patterns: "The way that kids are consuming content today, they're still watching linear television, but increasingly they're consuming content digitally, online. We've created a story format here that reflects that. It's a combination of digital and linear." Each episode is written by Jennifer Muro and directed by Brad Rau.

The series' original score, opening theme, and closing theme was composed by Ryan Shore.

== Episodes ==
=== Series overview ===
Season	Episodes	Originally released	
Season	Episodes	First released	Last released
1	16	July 3, 2017 (YouTube) July 9, 2017 (Disney Channel)	November 1, 2017 (YouTube) October 29, 2017 (Disney Channel)
2	16	March 19, 2018 (YouTube) March 25, 2018 (Disney Channel)	May 25, 2018 (YouTube) May 25, 2018 (Disney Channel)

=== Season 1 (2017) ===
No. overall	No. in season	Title	Original release date	Original Disney Channel air date	Length
1	1	"Sands of Jakku"	July 3, 2017	July 9, 2017	2:49
On Jakku, Rey takes BB-8 home, where BB-8 can stay until someone comes for the droid. A hungry nightwatcher worm swallows BB-8 and disappears into the sand. Rey saves BB-8 by hitting the hidden worm with a lucky throw of her quarterstaff. She feeds the worm junk, appeasing its appetite.
2	2	"BB-8 Bandits"	July 4, 2017	July 9, 2017	2:49
On Jakku, Rey and BB-8 head to Niima Outpost, hoping someone is looking for BB-8 there. Teedo and two bandits, who want BB-8, attack them. In the ensuing speeder chase, Rey causes the bandits to crash. She lures Teedo to the nightwatcher worm, which eats Teedo's speeder. She and BB-8 escape.
3	3	"Ewok Escape"	July 5, 2017	October 1, 2017	2:34
Princess Leia is led through the forests of Endor by an Ewok, Wicket. They find two other Ewoks cornered by stormtroopers. Wicket traps the stormtroopers, but his plan soon goes awry. Leia rescues him. The Ewoks take Leia to their village, and they give her a dress and spear.
4	4	"The Padawan Path"	July 6, 2017	October 1, 2017	3:04
Ahsoka Tano is late for a ceremony at the Jedi Temple on Coruscant. She hears screaming and detours to rescue civilians from a malfunctioning droid. She arrives at the temple, and Yoda praises her growth as a Padawan and gives her a bead for her Padawan braid. Her master Anakin Skywalker expresses pride in her.
5	5	"Beasts of Echo Base"	July 7, 2017	October 1, 2017	2:49
Set prior to The Empire Strikes Back, Leia and R2-D2 search for Chewbacca, who disappeared while digging corridors for the base on Hoth. They find he has been captured by a Wampa. Leia distracts the Wampa while Chewbacca and R2-D2 fix the door, and the three of them seal the Wampa out of the base. Guest star: Anthony Daniels as the voice of C-3PO.
6	6	"The Imposter Inside"	July 8, 2017	October 1, 2017	2:19
On Coruscant, Ahsoka and Senator Padmé Amidala prepare for controversial diplomatic negotiations held over dinner. They notice that the table is set incorrectly, forcing a disguised Clawdite assassin to reveal herself. They subdue the assassin. However, the room is destroyed, and the negotiations must be postponed.
7	7	"The Stranger"	July 9, 2017	October 1, 2017	2:34
Stormtroopers on Lothal attempt to confiscate a girl's pet cat, but Jyn Erso intervenes. The cat escapes, and Jyn and the stormtroopers give chase. She subdues the stormtroopers and reunites the girl with her pet.
8	8	"Bounty of Trouble"	July 9, 2017	October 1, 2017	2:34
Stormtroopers escort Leia on Lothal. Sabine Wren stages Leia's kidnapping so that Leia, secretly working for the Rebel Alliance, can give Sabine a data tape of Imperial base locations. However, bounty hunter droid IG-88 attacks them for the tape. They set the stormtroopers against IG-88. Leia successfully passes Sabine the tape and returns to her escort.
9	9	"Newest Recruit"	October 1, 2017	October 29, 2017	3:03
Ketsu helps Sabine steal food from the Empire on Lothal, but Ketsu is unsure she will join the Rebellion. The mission turns into a shootout with Stormtroopers, and a child is caught in the crossfire. Ketsu rescues the child, and Sabine calls Hera to airlift the three of them to safety in the Ghost. Aboard the Ghost, Ketsu makes up her mind and joins the Rebellion.
10	10	"Tracker Trouble"	October 2, 2017	October 29, 2017	2:19
Rey, Han Solo, BB-8, Chewbacca, and Finn are travelling to Maz's castle when the Millennium Falcon is pulled out of hyperspace. Rey, Finn, and Chewbacca search for a tracker, but they find a bomb instead. Rey and Chewbacca throw the bomb into space while Finn instructs Han to make the jump back to hyperspace. Guest star: John Boyega as the voice of Finn.
11	11	"Teach You, I Will"	October 3, 2017	October 29, 2017	3:19
At the Jedi Temple, Anakin wants to teach a frustrated Ahsoka how to use two lightsabers at once. Yoda mediates and teaches her a valuable lesson on the importance of individuality.
12	12	"The Starfighter Stunt"	October 4, 2017	October 29, 2017	2:49
While Ahsoka teaches Padmé how to pilot a jet fighter, a Droid Starfighter attacks them. Padmé must use her newly learned skills in piloting to help them escape.
13	13	"Accidental Allies"	October 29, 2017	October 29, 2017	2:48
Sabine helps Jyn escape a stormtrooper pursuit and Jyn helps Sabine. Note: Last episode with Felicity Jones as the voice of Jyn Erso.
14	14	"An Imperial Feast"	October 30, 2017	October 29, 2017	2:45
Leia orders Han to bargain with fellow pilot Hera Syndulla for rations that hungry Ewoks might enjoy.
15	15	"The Happabore Hazard"	October 31, 2017	October 29, 2017	2:45
Rey discovers a stubborn, unmoving Happabore sitting on the ship she's meant to tow back for Unkar Plut.
16	16	"Crash Course"	November 1, 2017	October 29, 2017	2:15
Sabine reluctantly lets Ketsu borrow her favorite speeder for a covert mission.

=== Season 2 (2018) ===
A second season of sixteen additional episodes was announced in September 2017. The episodes were released on March 19, 2018 online and aired on Disney Channel on March 25, 2018.

No. overall	No. in season	Title	Original release date	Original Disney Channel air date	Length
17	1	"Hasty Departure"	March 19, 2018	March 25, 2018	2:17
Hera and Sabine liberate an Imperial shuttle, but because Sabine was rushing, they board the wrong ship and it's full of troopers! Chopper flies the correct shuttle and rescues his friends mid-air.
18	2	"Unexpected Company"	March 19, 2018	March 25, 2018	2:32
Ahsoka joins Anakin on a mission planned for just him and Padme. Anakin, upset at the intrusion, sets a quicker flight path that puts them in the path of a Separatist blockade. The three must put differences aside to get past the blockade.
19	3	"Shuttle Shock"	March 19, 2018	March 25, 2018	2:02
On their approach to Canto Bight, Finn and Rose encounter a pod of creatures in the atmosphere. When a tentacle hits the shuttle and shorts out BB-8, Finn and Rose must work together to fix BB-8 and land the shuttle safely. Guest star: John Boyega as the voice of Finn.
20	4	"Jyn's Trade"	March 19, 2018	March 25, 2018	2:02
A Chadra-Fan child snatches Jyn's kyber crystal necklace away and Jyn gives chase. When she finally catches the kid and retrieves her necklace, she realizes the child is just hungry and gives him her piece of fruit. Note: Only episode with Helen Sadler as the voice of Jyn Erso.
21	5	"Run Rey Run"	March 19, 2018	March 25, 2018	2:32
While scavenging inside a Star Destroyer, Rey is cornered by Teedo who is on the hunt for a valuable part. Rey tries to warn Teedo the removal of the part will trigger the vessel's collapse, but he does it anyway and she must help them both escape after Teedo is knocked out by falling debris.
22	6	"Bounty Hunted"	March 19, 2018	March 25, 2018	2:17
Seeking help to free Han from Jabba, Leia, Chewbacca, and R2-D2 travel to Ord Mantell to meet with Han's old friend Maz Kanata. Maz lures bounty hunter Boushh into a firefight so Leia can obtain his helmet and armor for a perfect disguise.
23	7	"The Path Ahead"	March 19, 2018	March 25, 2018	2:47
Struggling with his Jedi training, Luke is grateful for master Yoda's offer to join him on a sojourn through the trees and swamps of Dagobah, until he learns that Yoda will be riding in his backpack! Minding Yoda, Luke learns to trust what he feels instead of what he thinks he sees. First of two episodes not to feature any female characters.
24	8	"Porg Problems"	March 19, 2018	March 25, 2018	1:32
As Rey struggles to force lift stones, a curious porg snatches her lightsaber! Rey gives chase and force lifts the porg before it can dive into the water with her saber. Rey thanks the porg for the unexpected help in her training, as others gesture wanting to be force-lifted by her.
25	9	"Chopper and Friends"	May 4, 2018	May 25, 2018	2:17
Hera is surprised to discover that Chopper has crewed the Ghost with two Ewoks who prove their mettle and help take down some stray TIEs over Endor.
26	10	"Monster Misunderstanding"	May 4, 2018	May 25, 2018	2:02
Queen Amidala helps solve the mystery of why a Sando Aqua monster is attacking the docks of Naboo when she interrupts poachers attempting to steal the creature's baby.
27	11	"Art History"	May 4, 2018	May 25, 2018	2:32
Sabine and Tristan are on a covert mission to free Mandalore, but they risk everything to destroy an Imperial outpost that has defaced a symbolic statue of Tarre Vizsla.
28	12	"Porgs!"	May 4, 2018	May 25, 2018	2:02
Chewie is exasperated when a pair of porgs tears blue wiring out of the Falcon. Further investigation with help from R2-D2 reveals that the porgs are looking for hard-to-find blue moss for their nest—if only Chewie can get it for them. Second of two episodes not to feature any female characters.
29	13	"Perilous Pursuit"	May 4, 2018	May 25, 2018	2:17
In a dangerous snowspeeder chase across Starkiller Base, Rey and Finn work together to escape pursuing snowtroopers. Guest star: John Boyega as the voice of Finn.
30	14	"Traps and Tribulations"	May 4, 2018	May 25, 2018	2:17
Luke and Leia (with the aid of a lightsaber) help Kneesaa and Wicket stop a rampaging Gorax by resetting the Ewoks' traps.
31	15	"A Disarming Lesson"	May 4, 2018	May 25, 2018	2:02
Ahsoka gives Ezra a lesson in finding his inner strength and trusting in the Force when she disarms him and pressures him to adapt to her attacks on the fly.
32	16	"Triplecross"	May 25, 2018	May 25, 2018	2:17
Hondo teams up with bounty hunter droid IG-88 to capture Qi'ra, but she outsmarts both her pursuers by pitting them against each other so that she can collect the bounty on them.

== Distribution ==
Forces of Destiny premiered on July 3, 2017, through Disney's YouTube channel, beginning the daily release of a set of eight episodes. It was initially announced that this release would culminate in the broadcast premiere of the eight episode set on Disney Channel on July 9 as a thirty-minute special, but on July 9, Disney announced via Twitter that only two episodes were going to be broadcast. A second set of eight episodes was released in October 2017. It was subsequently announced that episodes will air in two half-hour specials on Disney Channel on October 1 and 29. The series is available on the Disney+ streaming service, which launched on November 12, 2019.

== Books ==
A series of youth books adapted the episodes. Daring Adventures: Volume 1 adapted shorts about Sabine, Rey, and Padmé, and Daring Adventures: Volume 2 adapted shorts about Jyn, Ahsoka, and Leia. IDW Publishing published Star Wars: Forces of Destiny, a weekly all-ages five-issue comic book miniseries that ran from January to May 2018.

== Merchandising ==
Alongside the initial series announcement, Lucasfilm also announced a related toy line from Hasbro and an apparel line. The toy line features a new class of figures, adventures figures fill the space between action figures and dolls. These 11-inch articulated figures of the six core female characters and smaller paired figures of other characters launched on August 1, 2017 alongside accessories such as lightsabers. Other characters, including Luke Skywalker and Kylo Ren, are intended to be released.

== Reception ==
SyFy Wire calls Forces of Destiny "a great concept in search of a far better execution. ... What could have been a female-centric version of Genndy Tartakovsky's Clone Wars shorts from 2003 is instead a series of disconnected stories tied to a singular visual aesthetic ... As fun as it is to watch these female characters get a bit more screentime, it's still not enough."

=== Awards ===
Year	Event	Award	Recipient	Result
2019	ASCAP Screen Music Awards	Top Cable Television Series	Ryan Shore	Won
