= List of The Book of Boba Fett characters =

Four of the most prominent characters from The Book of Boba Fett: from left to right, Boba Fett (Temuera Morrison), Fennec Shand (Ming-Na Wen), Cad Bane (Dorian Kingi / Corey Burton), and Din Djarin "The Mandalorian" (Pedro Pascal).

The Book of Boba Fett, an American space Western television miniseries created by Jon Favreau and released for the streaming service Disney+ from December 29, 2021 to February 9, 2022, features an extensive number of cast members and characters. The protagonists of the series are the title character and antihero Boba Fett, a bounty hunter, crime lord, and clone of his father Jango Fett; Fennec Shand, an elite mercenary and assassin in Fett's service; and The Mandalorian (Din Djarin), a lone Mandalorian bounty hunter who has worked with Fett before.

Several supporting characters also appear in the series, including Fett's allies such as 8D8, Krrsantan, Garsa Fwip, Drash, and Skad. The main villains of the series are the Pyke Syndicate, who are a group of aliens of the Pyke species that run spice throughout the galaxy, and bounty hunter Cad Bane, an ally of the Pykes. The Hutt Twins also appear as minor antagonists. Other characters that appear in the series include Mayor Mok Shaiz, Lortha Peel, Peli Motto, Cobb Vanth, Ahsoka Tano, and Luke Skywalker.

The characters from The Book of Boba Fett have received mostly positive reviews. While Boba Fett was met with mixed reviews, the other two main protagonists were acclaimed. The supporting characters received positive reviews, with Krrsantan being praised and Drash and Skad receiving mixed reactions. The portrayals for the series were commended, along with the voice acting.

== Main characters ==
=== Boba Fett ===
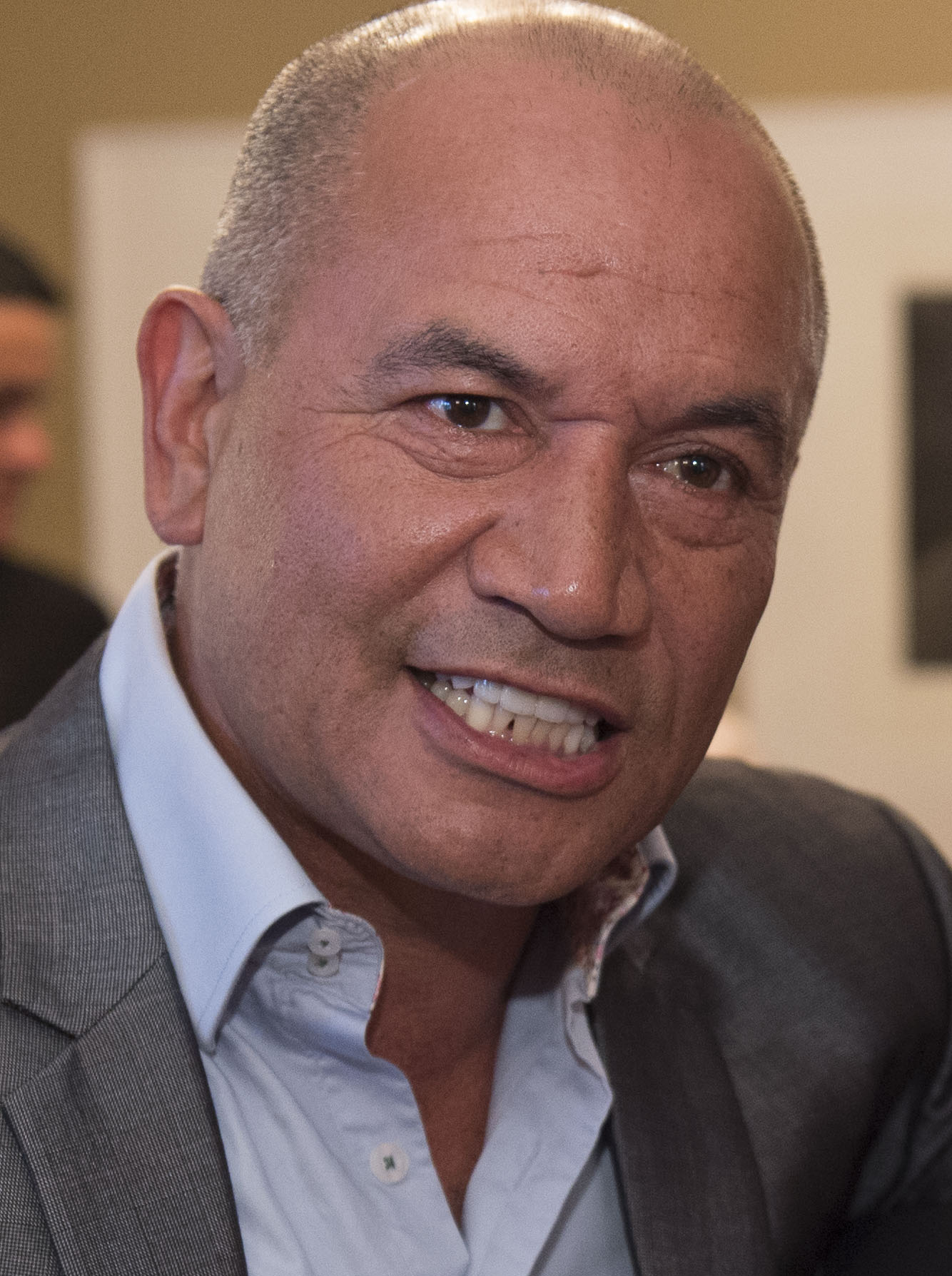
Temuera Morrison portrays and voices the title character of The Book of Boba Fett.

Boba Fett is the title character and antihero of The Book of Boba Fett. He is a Mandalorian bounty hunter, crime lord, and clone of his father Jango Fett. In the series, he barely escapes the sarlacc (Note: As he is seen getting trapped in the sarlacc in Return of the Jedi) and loses his armor to Jawas. He is then captured by Tusken Raiders, where he learns their ways and helps protect them. Later, Fett finds Fennec Shand, an assassin, half-dead and takes her to a cybernetic shop to get parts of her body replaced. Fett, with the help of Shand, gets his ship, Slave I, back and later takes the throne of Jabba the Hutt's empire after killing his successor Bib Fortuna. (Note: As seen in a post-credit scene in "Chapter 16: The Rescue" of The Mandalorian) Later, in "Chapter 9: The Marshal" of The Mandalorian, Fett gets his armor back from a man named Cobb Vanth. Fett and Shand, who decides to remain with him, take control of Jabba the Hutt's criminal empire of Tatooine. Fett ends up going to war with the Pyke Syndicate, because they are selling spice throughout Mos Espa. Fett defeats the Pykes and kills theirs allies, restoring Mos Espa to what it was.

Fett is portrayed by Temuera Morrison, who has played Fett before in The Mandalorian and has also played Jango Fett in other Star Wars media. Daniel Logan portrays young Boba Fett from archive footage from Star Wars: Episode II – Attack of the Clones with Finnegan Garay serving as the on-set actor. JJ Dashnaw serves as Morrison's stunt double. Morrison said that he thinks fate had to do with him getting the role of Boba Fett, like when he met Jon Favreau on the set of Couples Retreat. When playing Fett, Morrison said that he tried to focus on Fett's "simmering kind of violence" and desire for revenge, as well as his loneliness, that was caused by watching his father die at a young age. In an interview with NME, Morrison said that he tried to cut his character's dialogue when Favreau was away from the set because he thought Fett talked too much. He also tried to give some of his lines to Ming-Na Wen and cut some of her lines as well, saying that he wanted their characters to stay somewhat mysterious and quiet. Morrison also added in the ceremony scene for the Tusken Raiders after their camp was destroyed. The script originally had the Tuskens thrown in a fire, but Morrison said, "Oh, hang on, we got to put a bit of ceremony into this".

Boba Fett's character in the series has received mixed reviews, while Morrison's portrayal of Fett has been praised. Some have said that, without Morrison portraying Boba Fett, the series might have been a total disaster and that he is the only face that could have brought Fett back to life. Rich Knight from CinemaBlend stated that he used to not like Fett, but became interested in his character as he was the only one in the series who "seems like an actual human being". Chris Edwards of The Guardian said that Disney+ ruined one of the "coolest and most mysterious characters" in Star Wars.

=== Fennec Shand ===
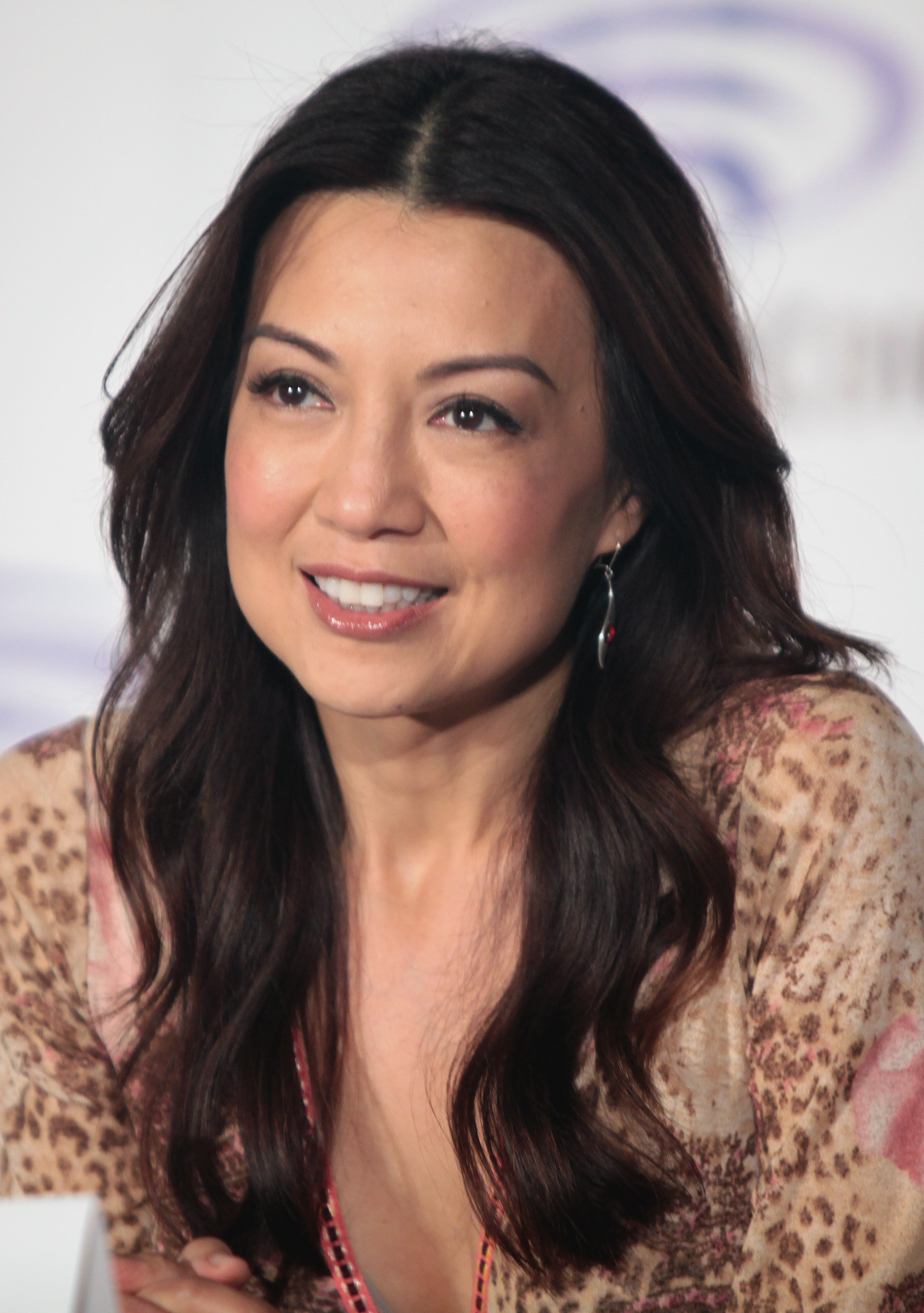
Fennec Shand, who is the first major Asian villain in Star Wars, is voiced and portrayed Ming-Na Wen.

Fennec Shand is an elite mercenary and assassin. In The Mandalorian, Shand is captured by Din Djarin as a bounty and is left half-dead by Toro Calican, who Djarin was working with. In The Book of Boba Fett, Shand is saved from dying by Boba Fett and has parts of her body replaced with cybernetics. She helps Fett get his ship Slave I back and serves as Fett's new partner to help him take control of Jabba's empire. During the war with the Pykes, Shand saves the cyborg gang and kills the Pyke Boss, Mayor Mok Shaiz, and the others crime lords of Mos Espa, who betray Fett.

Ming-Na Wen portrays and voices Fennec Shand in The Mandalorian, Star Wars: The Bad Batch, and in The Book of Boba Fett with Ming Qiu as her stunt double. Fennec Shand is the first major Star Wars villain/antihero character portrayed by an Asian actress. Wen stated that it was her "dream role of a lifetime" to play Fennec. Wen also said that because she has been a Star Wars fan since her childhood, she feels that she has been preparing for the role of Fennec her entire life. She also went on to say that there is a lot about Fennec that she felt familiar with, "as a woman who needs to struggle and make a name for herself, and strive to beat the odds". Shand's costume design, done by Joseph Porro, was based on the fennec fox. Wen said that it was an "amazing outfit that I fell in love with right away".

Fennec Shand has received positive reviews. TV Insiders' Emily Hannemann stated that she is just "plain cool" saying, "Not every character can steal a scene by sitting and drinking spotchka, but not every character is Fennec Shand." Anthony Breznican of Vanity Fair said that the character had contributed to the trend of more diverse characters in Star Wars. Stating that Ming-Na Wen's Fennec Shand, like Din Djarin and Grogu, has left a mark in the Star Wars franchise, CinemaBlend's Erik Swann praised Fennec Shand.

=== The Mandalorian ===
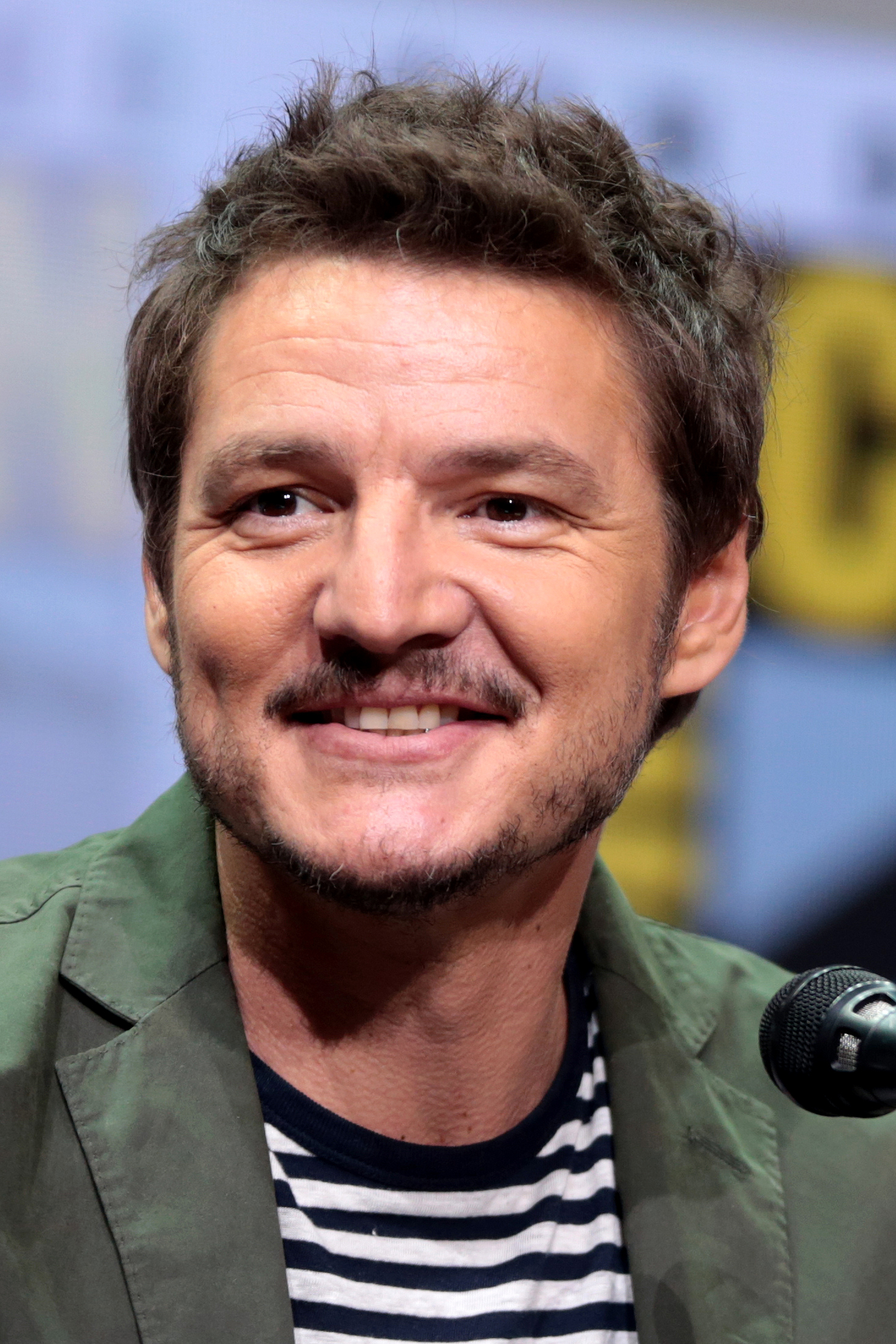
Pedro Pascal voices The Mandalorian, who is portrayed in the series by body doubles Brendan Wayne, Lateef Crowder, and Barry Lowin.

Din Djarin, known by his sobriquet The Mandalorian, is a lone Mandalorian bounty hunter that protects a young alien named Grogu. He appears as the title character and protagonist in the series The Mandalorian. In The Book of Boba Fett "Chapter 5: Return of the Mandalorian", he tracks and kills a bounty and brings their head in exchange for directions to a Mandalorian hideout. He finds the Armorer and Paz Vizsla, who are the last survivors of his Mandalorian warrior tribe, and they ask him about the Darksaber he has. Vizsla, whose ancestor created the Darksaber, duels the Mandalorian for the Darksaber and loses, but the Mandalorian reveals that he broke the Mandalorian code by removing his helmet and is stripped of his title as a Mandalorian. When he visits Peli Motto, he gets a new ship called the Naboo N-1 starfighter to replace his old one. Later, Shand asks if he can help Boba Fett with the imminent war against the Pykes, and he agrees.

The Mandalorian is voiced by Pedro Pascal, and portrayed by body doubles Brendan Wayne, Lateef Crowder, and Barry Lowin, who also together play the character in The Mandalorian. Brendan Wayne and Lateef Crowder serve as the body doubles for Pascal. Favreau said that the Mandalorian was inspired by Clint Eastwood's character The Man with No Name. Pascal has said that he was a Star Wars fan as a kid and that his favorite character was Boba Fett. Many were glad to see Pascal as the Mandalorian starring in The Book of Boba Fett. Polygon's Matt Patches praised the character, noting that he "steps back to the spotlight, and acts like the Boba Fett fans fell in love with in the first place."

=== Grogu ===
Grogu is a young force-sensitive alien of the same species as Yoda. In the series, Grogu is being trained by Luke Skywalker. Luke teaches him how to use the force by using a droid. While training him, Luke helps Grogu remember his past as a Jedi youngling, where Grogu sees Jedis trying to protect him during the events of the Great Jedi Purge. Later, Grogu is forced to make a decision to continue his training by taking Yoda's lightsaber, or follow the ways of a Mandalorian and take Djarin's gift, a chain-link beskar armor. Grogu chooses the armor and is taken back to Djarin, where he helps use the force in the war and puts Fett's rancor to sleep.

== Co-starring characters ==
=== The Armorer ===
The Armorer is the leader of the Mandalorian tribe of warriors Din Djarin is part of. She is seen in "Chapter 5: Return of the Mandalorian", where she is in a new secret location with the only other survivor of their tribe Paz Vizsla. When Djarin finds their new hideout, the Armorer inspects the Darksaber and explains its history, teaching him how to use it. Later, when Djarin reveals he broke the Mandalorian creed by taking off his helmet, she strips him of his title as a Mandalorian and tells him he can only get the title back by bathing in the living waters under the mines of Mandalore that have been destroyed. Seeing Djarin's beskar staff, she tells him that he needs to forge it into something else, as beskar can break beskar armor. He ask her to forge it into link armor as a present for Grogu, and she does so.

Emily Swallow portrays the Armorer, who is also portrayed by Swallow in The Mandalorian.

=== Cobb Vanth ===
Cobb Vanth is the marshal of Freetown, previously known as Mos Pelgos, who used to have Boba Fett's armor. He appears in "Chapter 6: From the Desert Comes a Stranger", where he is first seen stopping a group of Pykes from running spice in Freetown. Later, Djarin visits Vanth asking him to help him and Fett with the upcoming war against the Pyke Syndicate. Vanth is unsure if he and his people will help with the war. After Djarin leaves, bounty hunter Cad Bane, ally of the Pykes, tries to persuade Vanth into staying neutral, but instead ends up shooting him. After being shot, he is taken to Fett's palace where he is worked on by the Mod Artist.

Timothy Olyphant portrays Cobb Vanth.

=== Luke Skywalker ===
Luke Skywalker is a Jedi master who protects and trains a young alien named Grogu. He is first seen training Grogu how to use the force. Later, he helps Grogu remember his past as a youngling. When he receives Djarin's gift for Grogu, he tells Grogu that he can either choose Djarin's gift and follow the path of a Mandalorian, or he can choose Yoda's lightsaber and continue his training to becoming a Jedi.

Luke Skywalker is portrayed by Mark Hamill using reference photos of his younger self in CGI form. Graham Hamilton serves as the on-set actor for Luke while Hamill provided the voice of Luke.

=== Ahsoka Tano ===
Ahsoka Tano is a Jedi of the Togruta species. She appears at Luke Skywalker's training academy and finds Din Djarin resting on a bench, waiting to give Grogu his gift. Ahsoka tells Djarin that he should not see Grogu as it would go against the Jedi's rules of personal attachment. Upset, Djarin listens to Ahsoka, and lets her give the gift to Grogu. After Djarin leaves the academy, Ahsoka hands the gift to Luke, who expresses that he is unsure if Grogu is committed to the path of becoming a Jedi.

Ahsoka Tano is portrayed by Rosario Dawson, who has played her before in The Mandalorian.

=== Cad Bane ===
Cad Bane is a bounty hunter and ally of the Pykes that is of the Duros species. Cad Bane, on behalf of the Pykes, ask Cobb Vanth and his people to stay neutral in the war, but ends up shooting Cobb Vanth and his Deputy, when he sees the Deputy reach for his gun. Cad Bane then arrives at Mos Espa, demanding that Fett surrender. Fett refuses and war breaks out between him and the Pykes, with Bane telling Fett that the Pykes killed the Tuskens and framed the Nikto gang. Bane later finds himself in a standoff with Fett and shoots him. While an injured Fett is on the ground, Fett grabs his gaffi stick and stabs Bane in the chest.

Corey Burton, who has done the voice of Cad Bane before in the Star Wars: The Clone Wars and in the Star Wars: The Bad Batch series, provides the voice for him, and Dorian Kingi does the physical performance.

== Recurring characters ==
Several characters have recurred in more than two episodes in The Book of Boba Fett.

=== 8D8 ===
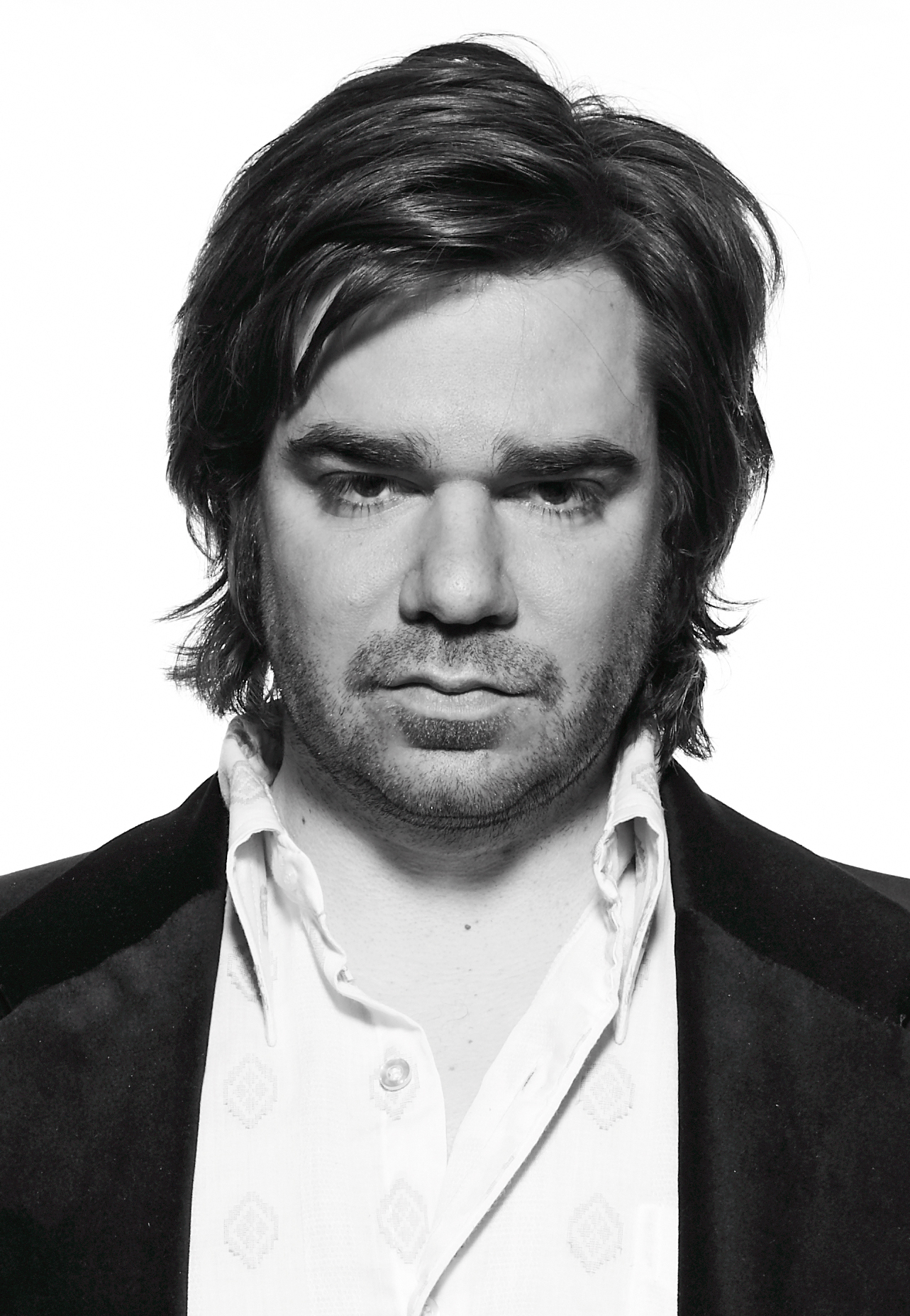
Comedian Matt Berry is the voice of 8D8.

8D8 is a smelter droid that has been reprogrammed as a torture droid for Jabba the Hutt and is now in Fett's service, after being reactivated by him. (Note: As seen in Return of the Jedi) 8D8 serves as Fett's majordomo and sometimes his translator droid. In the series, 8D8 introduces those who come to pay tribute to Boba Fett as the new leader of Jabba's former empire and also tells Fett he should keep the Gamorrean guards to show strength. He also tells Fett who the assassin of the Night Wind is. Later, he discusses the history of Jabba's former empire and helps Fett and Shand plan how to control it.

Matt Berry provides the voice for the droid and keeps the trend of featuring comedian voice actors as droids in Star Wars, with the most recent ones being Taika Waititi as IG-11 in The Mandalorian and Bill Hader as BB-8 in the Star Wars sequels.

Critics were glad to see 8D8 in the series. Mike Ryan from Uproxx expressed, "I can't help but feel happy for 8D8, finally getting his due". Blake Hawkins of Comic Book Resources liked 8D8, writing that there had been many murderous droids in Star Wars before, and they all had a purpose for killing, but said that "8D8 was just plain sadistic because he clearly enjoyed his job. It goes to show that droids could be programmed to do anything – even willing and ruthless torturers." TheWrap's Drew Taylor disliked 8D8, calling him a "fussy torture droid". Ethan Anderton of /Film said that Matt Berry as 8D8 is the greatest cameo in The Book of Boba Fett.

=== Twi'lek Majordomo ===
The Twi'lek Majordomo is the majordomo to Mayor Mok Shaiz of Mos Espa. When Boba Fett becomes the new leader of Jabba's former empire, the Twi'lek Majordomo comes to bring tribute to him on behalf of the mayor, but really demands a tribute of his own. He then apologizes, seeing that Fett is unhappy that the mayor did not come himself. Later, when Fett needs to meet with the mayor about how he promised Jabba's territory to another, the Majordomo says that the mayor is unavailable and secretly escapes on a speeder. Fett's newly acquired cyborg gang hunts him down, and he reveals that the mayor is working with the Pyke Syndicate. Fett and Djarin later use the Majordomo as a diversion to attack the Pykes by surprise, when they are surrounded outside what is left of The Sanctuary.

David Pasquesi portrays the Twi'lek Majordomo. He is a comedian who stars in Strangers with Candy, which had another comedian, Amy Sedaris, who plays Peli Motto in The Mandalorian and The Book of Boba Fett. Pasquesi as the Twi'lek majordomo has received positive reviews. /Film's Brian Young said, "Star Wars has had a great run of casting comedians in key roles on their television shows and Pasquesi's weaselly Majordomo is no exception."

=== Garsa Fwip ===
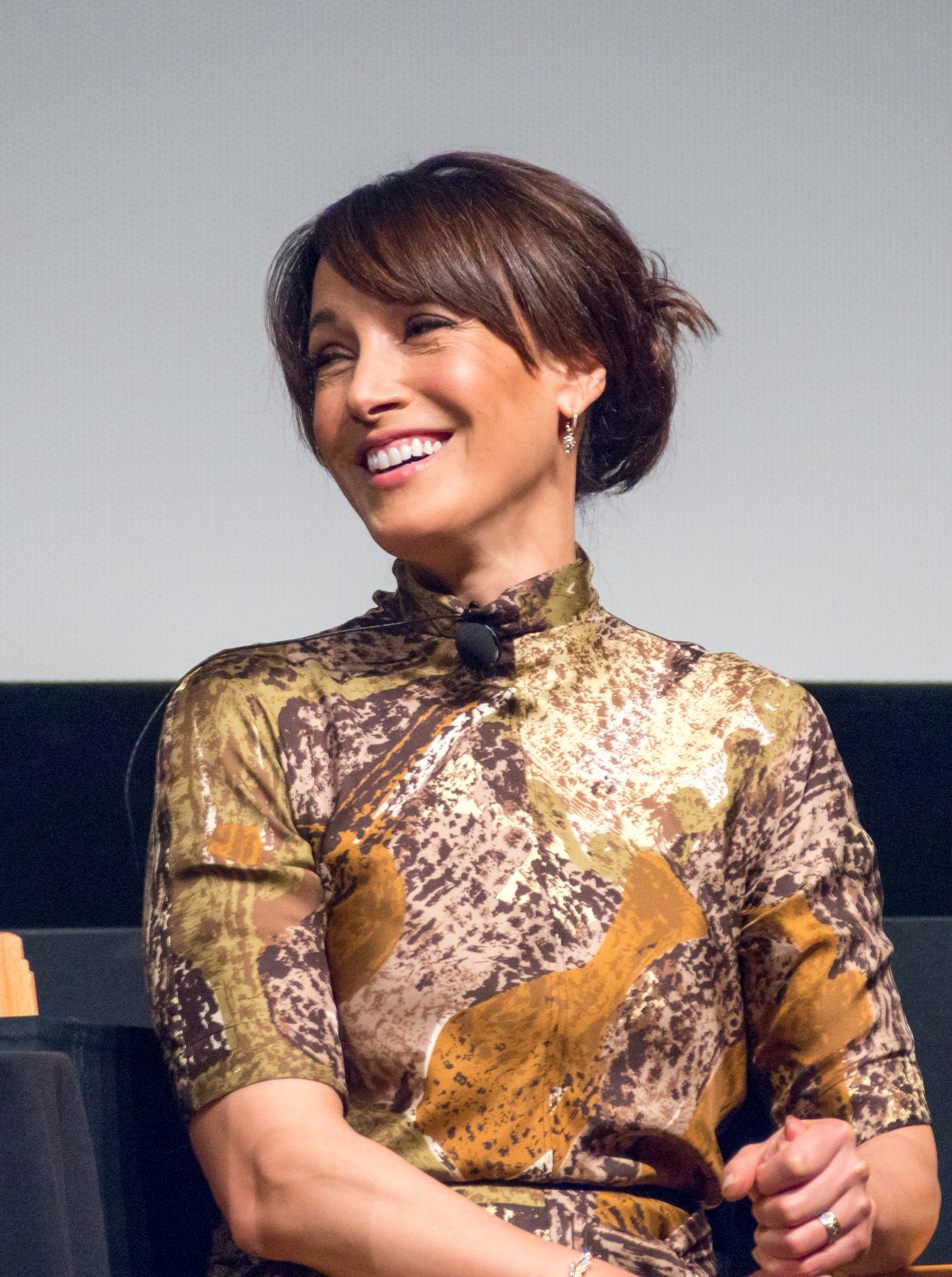
Jennifer Beals portrays Garsa Fwip.

Madam Garsa Fwip, a Twi'lek commonly referred to as Garsa Fwip, runs The Sanctuary, a cantina in Mos Espa. In the series, Fett and Shand come to pay a visit to her cantina letting her know that the cantina will still thrive under their watch. While there, Fwip quickly gets someone to polish their helmets and fill Fett's with coins, giving him his share of the pay. Later, when Fett and Shand return to the cantina, they hear loud drums banging outside, and Fwip explains that two of Jabba's cousins, The Twins, have come to claim Fett's land that used to be Jabba's. In "Chapter 4: The Gathering Storm", Krrsantan starts fighting Trandoshians inside the cantina, and Fwip tries to stop him by telling him of his past of being a gladiator, and how he has already showed how great and powerful he is. Krrsantan does not listen and continues to fight. Later, while Fwip is inside The Sanctuary, two Pykes blow it up, killing her.

Jennifer Beals portrays Garsa Fwip. In an interview with Variety, Beals said that she was hired to play Fwip when her brother had just told her about The Mandalorian, and she walked into the room to hear the phone ring with someone telling her she got the job for a Star Wars show, so she started watching The Mandalorian. She said that when she first stepped on set, she had no clue what series she was part of, but said that she knew what her character was like. She also admitted she did not know much about Star Wars.

When asked if her lekku, the two tentacle-like appendages on Twi'leks' heads, were hard to put and keep on, she said that Brian Sipe and Alexei Dmitriew made it easy for her by making them light and balance perfectly on her head. For Fwip's costume design, Beals said that she was talking to her costume designer, Shawna Trpcic, about meditation and Trpcic told her if she ever had any images of her character's appearance while she was meditating to tell her. Beals sent her images, and Trpcic put them into her design. Beals also said that one of Fwip's costumes was designed as Fwip's version of a cat eye, and said that the makeup was a throwback to the Egyptian lineage. The scar that goes from Fwip's collarbone to her sternum was also Beals' idea, since she thought that you cannot come out of a war without a scratch. For the original script, Fwip's servants would call her master, but Beals did not like that saying Fwip is trying to create a sanctuary of beauty so they changed it to madam. Beals was also working on the second season of The L Word: Generation Q when filming The Book of Boba Fett and she said that it was like two totally different worlds. Since her lekku were already made and her makeup artist created stencils for the eye makeup, Beals said that it took less time to do the makeup for The Book of Boba Fett than it did in The L Word.

Many have said that they thought Fwip was going to be the main villain of the series. ComicBook.com's Jamie Jirak was excited to see Beals as Fwip. Fans were also pleased to see Beals playing Fwip.

Fwip has been received a mixed reception by critics, her minor role in the series being criticised. Screen Rant ranked her the 10th best supporting character in The Book of Boba Fett. /Film has put her at the 10th best character in the series, stating, "Jennifer Beals was sadly not given that much to do with her Twi'lek nightclub owner, but what we get of her was promising." Hannah Flint, writer at IGN, was disappointed in Beals' casting as what ultimately proved to be a minor character and "cameo", writing that it "amounts to nothing".

=== Krrsantan ===
Black Krrsantan is a black-furred Wookiee, who is a bounty hunter and former gladiator hired by The Hutt Twins as a bodyguard and is now in Fett's service. Krrsantan originally appeared in Marvel's Star Wars comics, where he is exiled from Kashyyyk, becomes a gladiator, fights Chewbacca as well as Obi-Wan Kenobi (who gave him his signature scar), becomes a bounty hunter for Darth Vader and Jabba the Hutt, was briefly partnered with Boba Fett, and sometimes serves as a bodyguard for Doctor Aphra. In the series, he makes his first appearance as the Hutt Twins' bodyguard to intimidate Fett. Later, the Hutt Twins send Krrsantan to assassinate Fett while he is in his bacta tank, but Krrsantan fails when Fett and his allies trap him in the empty rancor cage. Fett releases him and later hires him as one of his bodyguards, after he rips the arm of a Trandoshan in The Sanctuary. During the war, Krrsantan watches the central and business districts of Mos Espa, owned by the Trandoshans, to make sure the Pykes do not enter through that way. The Trandoshans betray Fett and attack Krrsantan, but he is able to defend himself and helps Fett fight off the Pykes.

Carey Jones portrays Krrsantan. Via Twitter, Angie Mayhew, widow of the late Peter Mayhew, who portrayed Chewbacca, welcomed Carey Jones to the "Wookiee family". In an interview, Morrison said that for Krrsantan's first appearance he is performed by a man named "Big" Dave in a costume. Krrsantan was originally created by Kieron Gillen and Salvador Larocca for Marvel Comics.

Krrsantan has been widely praised. Eric Francisco of Inverse praised the Wookiee, calling him "one of the most fearsome characters to ever carry a blaster". He also said that Krrsantan "is easily one the scariest characters in Star Wars history" and said that his "intimidating presence" makes The Book of Boba Fett a treat. Comic Book Resources' Brenton Stewart gave the title for the most interesting character on The Book of Boba Fett to Krrsantan saying, "He has a cool design... and an intriguing and imagination-provoking background, with both gladiators and bounty hunters earning instant cool points for any character where their combination only puts him over the top."

=== Drash and Skad ===
Drash and Skad are the two leaders of the cyborg gang that steal Lortha Peel's water. Seeing that they have no pay, Fett hires them after he stops them from stealing Peel's water. As Fett's new bodyguards, they help trap Krrsantan in the empty rancor cage, when he tries to assassinate Fett. Later, when the Twi'lek Majordomo tries to run from Fett, Drash and the rest of her gang chase him down and stop him. After convincing Fett to fight the Pykes on the streets of Mos Espa instead of his palace, Drash and Skad both help Boba Fett defeat the Pykes.

Drash is portrayed by Sophie Thatcher and Skad is portrayed by Jordan Bolger. Jon Favreau compared Thatcher's character to a sci-fi Joan Jett. In an interview with The Hollywood Reporter, Thatcher said that she deleted Twitter and Reddit, because she did not want to hear anything about the series. She also said that to get the role she did a self-tape with her sister and later heard she got the job. When asked whether she knew what she was going for with her character, she responded saying that they let her improvise some and also asked her to do a British accent, which she thought worked well with Jordan Boldger even though she has an American accent. She previously worked with Pedro Pascal on the film Prospect. Thatcher said that for her cybernetic arm they started off doing it with makeup and prosthetics, but they did not like it so they instead put a green sleeve on her arm to later computer animate it. In the fighting scene with Krrsantan, she said, "I guess it wasn't a lot of stunt stuff, but I'm not used to it at all. Even doing a little ducking and moving around and getting the right steps was really stressful for me. I'm not the most coordinated person, so I had to do a lot of physical acting." For the speeder chase scene, she said that she was on a rig the whole time instead of an actual speeder. She also said that most of the filming was done on the backlot with some of it in the volume, an area where motion capture filming takes place.

Drash and Skad have received generally mixed reviews. Their gang was negatively compared to the Power Rangers, while some positively said they looked like a homage to George Lucas's film American Graffiti.

== Featured guest characters ==
Several characters have been featured in two or less episodes in The Book of Boba Fett and are considered to play a significant part.

=== Hutt Twins ===
The Hutt Twins, commonly referred to as just The Twins, are one male and one female, who are cousins of Jabba the Hutt. They are from the planet Nal Hutta and come to take control over Jabba's empire on Tatooine, after the death of Bib Fortuna, who took over Jabba the Hutt's throne when he died. The Twins are first seen in "Chapter 2: The Tribes of Tatooine", where they confront Fett telling him he needs to give over Jabba's land, threatening him with Wookiee bounty hunter Krrsantan. After Fett refuses, they leave saying that they will be back. The Twins later send Krrsantan to kill Fett, but their plan fails. They come to apologize to Fett bringing him a rancor and leave Tatooine telling Fett that Mayor Mok Shaiz promised the land to another.

In an interview with TVLine's Matt Mitovich, Morrison and Wen told Mitovich that when filming the scene for the Hutt Twins' introduction, they were actually looking at cardboard cutouts of their characters with Morrison's stand-in, Jimmy, doing the voice-over. Jamie Lovett of ComicBook.com described The Twins as "a pair of interesting new antagonists to contend with Boba Fett". The Ringer's Ben Lindbergh criticized The Twins CGI, saying that it did not look as great as the one-ton Jabba the Hutt puppet.

=== Lortha Peel ===
Lortha Peel is a water-monger in the Worker's District of Mos Espa, who appears in "Chapter 3: The Streets of Mos Espa". He comes to tell Fett that ever since he usurped the throne the city has been in chaos and that no one respects him. He continues to say that a cyborg gang keeps stealing his water and asks Fett to stop them. Paying off a fraction of what the gang owes, Fett stops them and tells Peel to lower his prices, seeing that they are too high.

Stephen Root portrays Lortha Peel.

=== Peli Motto ===
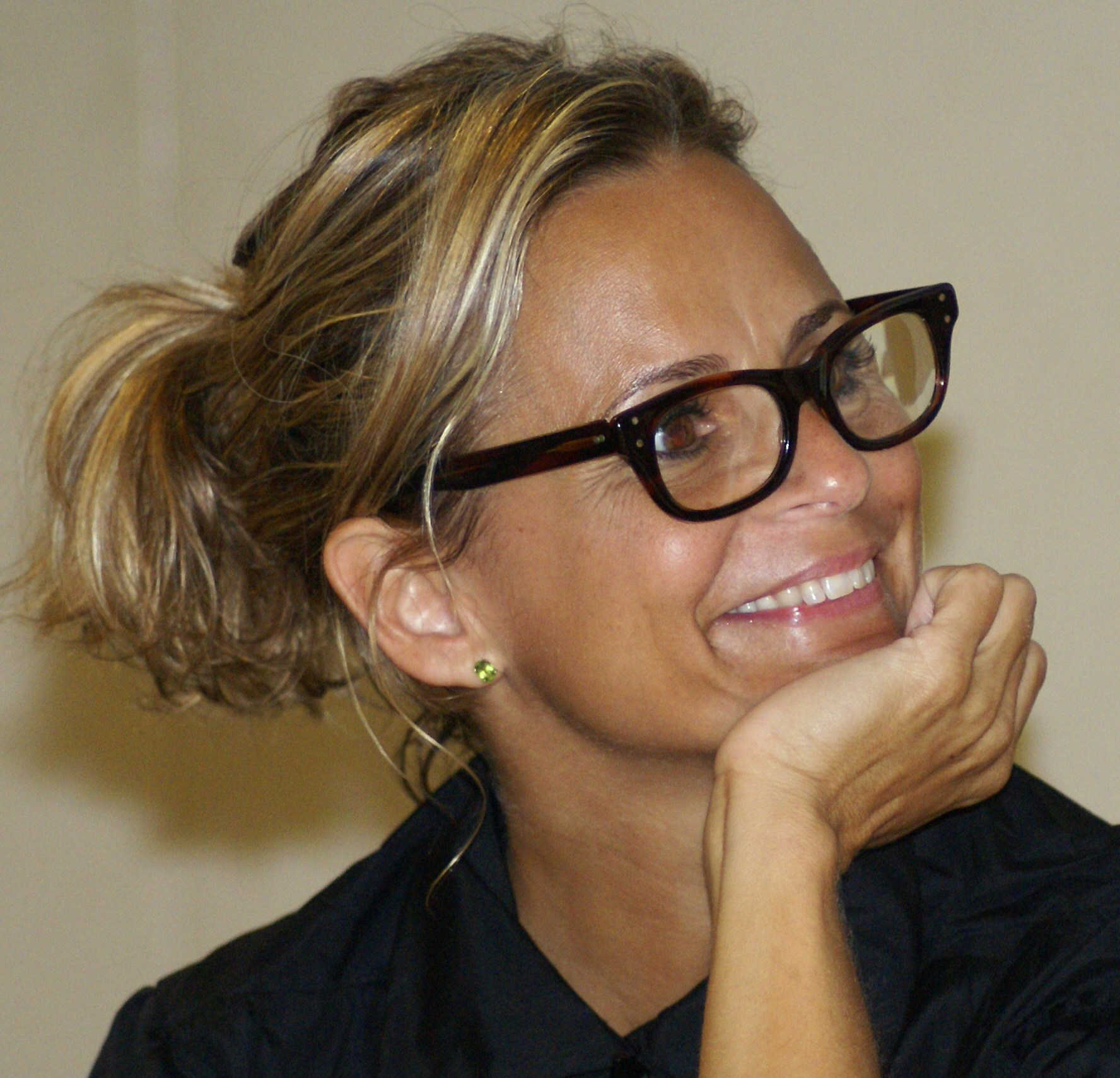
Peli Motto is portrayed by comedian and actress Amy Sedaris.

Peli Motto is a mechanic at a spaceport in Tatooine, who has previously appeared in The Mandalorian. Motto is first seen in the background of "Chapter 3: The Streets of Mos Espa", when Fett is on his way to meet with the Pyke Boss. When Djarin leaves the Mandalorian's hideout, she tells Djarin that she has a replacement for his old ship, the Razor Crest, which was obliterated. (Note: The ship was destroyed in "Chapter 14: The Tragedy" of The Mandalorian) She shows him an old Naboo N-1 Starfighter, but he express that he does not like it and thought she had another Razor Crest for him. Motto convinces him to stay and help work on the ship. Djarin then takes it on a test flight and keeps the ship. Later, R2-D2 drops off Grogu at Motto's spaceport, and she takes him to Djarin, who is in the midst of the battle with the Pykes.

Actress and comedian Amy Sedaris performs as Peli Motto in both The Book of Boba Fett and The Mandalorian. Sedaris worked with Jon Favreau before on The Mandalorian and the movie Elf. Jamie Jirak from ComicBook.com described Motto as the "lovable Tatooine mechanic" and said that he was glad to see her in a full appearance on the series.

=== Rancor Trainer ===
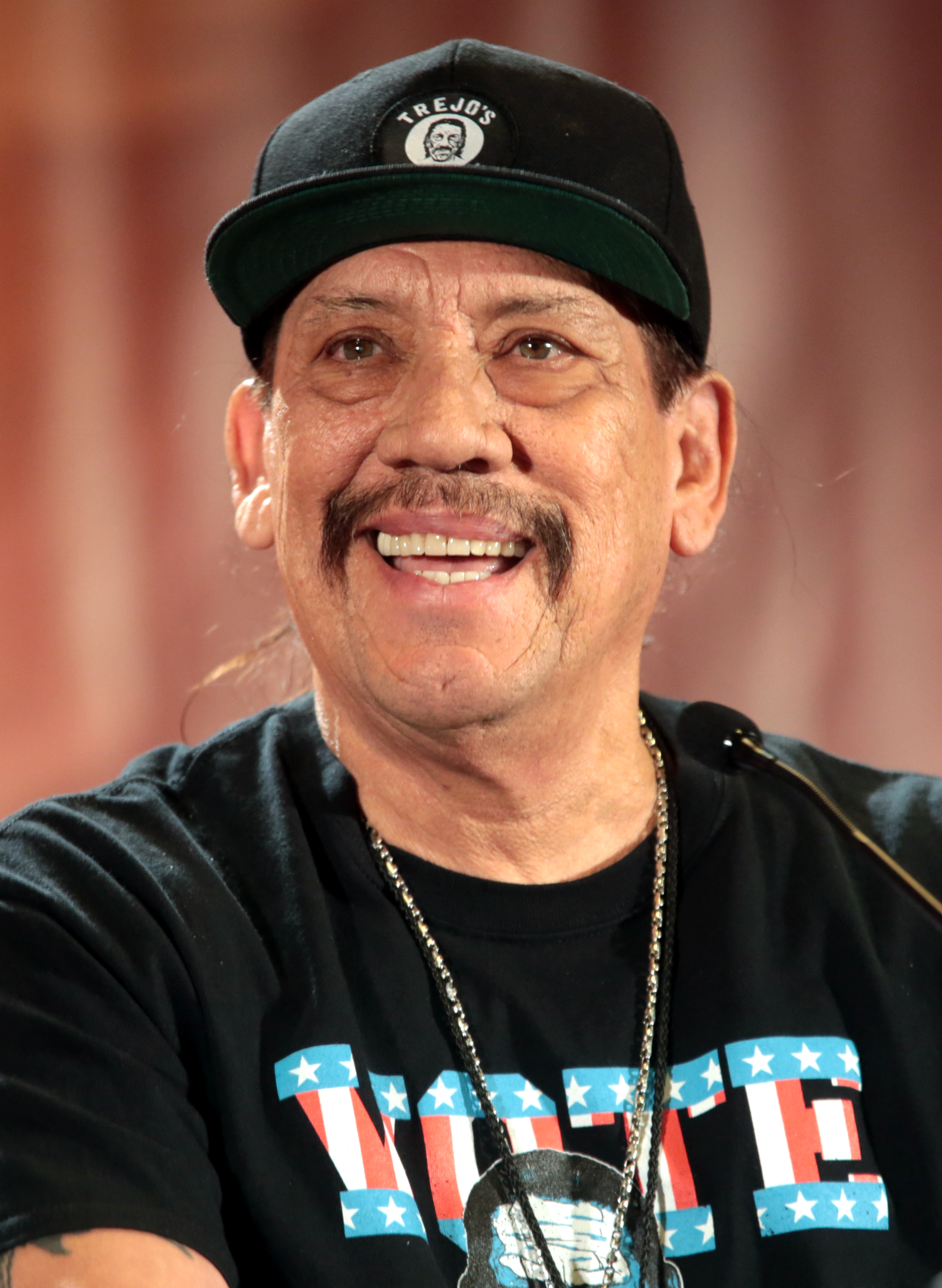
Danny Trejo, who has worked with director Robert Rodriguez before, is the performer of the Rancor Trainer.

The unnamed Rancor Trainer is introduced in "Chapter 3: The Streets of Mos Espa", where he brings Fett his new pet rancor calf, gifted to him as an apology from the Twins for sending Krrsantan to assassinate him. The rancor's cage had been empty ever since Luke killed Jabba's Rancor in Return of the Jedi. Once the rancor is put in its cage, the Trainer explains to Fett that rancors are complex creatures and will connect with the first human they see. He also goes on to say that they are loving and peaceful creatures unless threatened, unlike how rancors have been seen in the past as a huge monster that kill those who they can get their hands on. After learning that the Witches of Dathomir used to ride the creature, Fett tells the Trainer that he wants to learn how to ride the rancor. Later, in "Chapter 7: In the Name of Honor", Fett rides the rancor and destroys the Pykes' two Scorpenek annihilator droids.

Danny Trejo performs as the Rancor Trainer and has worked with Robert Rodriguez, who is one of the writers and directors of the series and is Trejo's second cousin, before in movies like Machete and Spy Kids. Trejo was happy to be working with Temuera Morrison tweeting, "Machete finally made it into space, Star Wars! It was great working with Temuera Morrison and others on #TheBookOfBobaFett!", while taking a picture with him besides the rancor prop. Many were happy to see Trejo as a character in The Book of Boba Fett. Scott Snowden from Space.com stated that Danny Trejo portraying the Rancor Trainer is "utterly perfect casting". Ryan Britt of Inverse said that Trejo brought his "signature wit, combined with a lurking sense of menace" to his character.

=== Mod Artist ===
The Mod Artist is the cybernetic mod artist, who has a robotic arm and saves Fennec Shand's life. He appears in "Chapter 4: The Gathering Storm" in one of Fett's flashbacks. After Fett finds Shand half-dead, he aids her and takes her to a mod-parlor shop, where parts of her body are replaced with cybernetics by the Mod Artist. In "Chapter 7: In the Name of Honor", the Mod Artist can be seen working on Cob Vanth in Fett's palace.

Musician Stephen "Thundercat" Bruner makes his acting debut as the Mod Artist. Costume designer, Shawna Trpcic, said that for his outfit she used a fabric that resembled the outfit of Star Wars character Lando Calrissian. Trpcic said that she created the design using old material from a British company that used wool on one side and a plastic raincoat fabric on the other side.

== Minor guest characters ==
Several characters in The Book of Boba Fett are considered to be minor characters or make a cameo in the series.

=== Tusken Kid ===
The Tusken Kid is the one who takes Boba Fett and the Rodian Prisoner to go find water in the desert. While they are searching for water, a big sand creature comes out of the sand and attacks them. Fett kills it, and the Tusken Kid brings back the head of the monster to the camp. The Kid also helps warn the other Tuskens that the spice train is coming by reflecting light off a mirror. The Kid is later killed when the Pykes, who frame the Nikto gang, come and destroy their camp.

The Tusken Kid is portrayed by Wessley Kimmel.

=== Tusken Chieftain ===
The Tusken Chieftain is the leader of the Tuskens that capture Boba Fett. When Fett comes back from searching for water, the chief rewards him by giving him some water. After Fett helps take out the spice train, the chief gifts him a lizard that goes into his brain and guides him to a tree to retrieve his own gaffi stick. Once he gets it, they accept Fett into the tribe. The Chief later dies when the Pykes come and kill them all.

The Tusken Chieftain is performed by Xavier Jimenez, who has previously performed as a Tusken in The Mandalorian.

=== Tusken Warrior ===
The Tusken Warrior is the female Tusken, who teaches Fett how to fight with a gaffi stick. After Fett teaches her and some other Tuskens how to use speeder bikes, she helps Fett take out the spice train that is killing their tribe. She later dies after the Pykes annihilate their camp.

Joanna Bennet plays the Tusken Warrior.

=== Rodian Prisoner ===
The Rodian Prisoner is of the Rodian species, a humanoid reptilian alien that hails from the planet Rodia. He appears in "Chapter 1: Stranger in a Strange Land" and is one of the captives, along with Boba Fett, of the Tusken raiders. When Fett tries to escape, the Rodian alerts the Tusken Raiders by shouting in an alien language. Later, a Tusken kid leads the Rodian and Fett out to the middle of the desert to find black melons for water. While searching, the Rodian uncovers the scales of a giant sand creature. The creature attacks them, killing the Rodian with Fett killing the creature.

The Rodian Prisoner is performed by Dawn Dininger with Sam Witwer, who has voiced the Star Wars character Darth Maul before in Star Wars: The Clone Wars, providing the uncredited voice for the Rodian.

=== Dokk Strassi ===
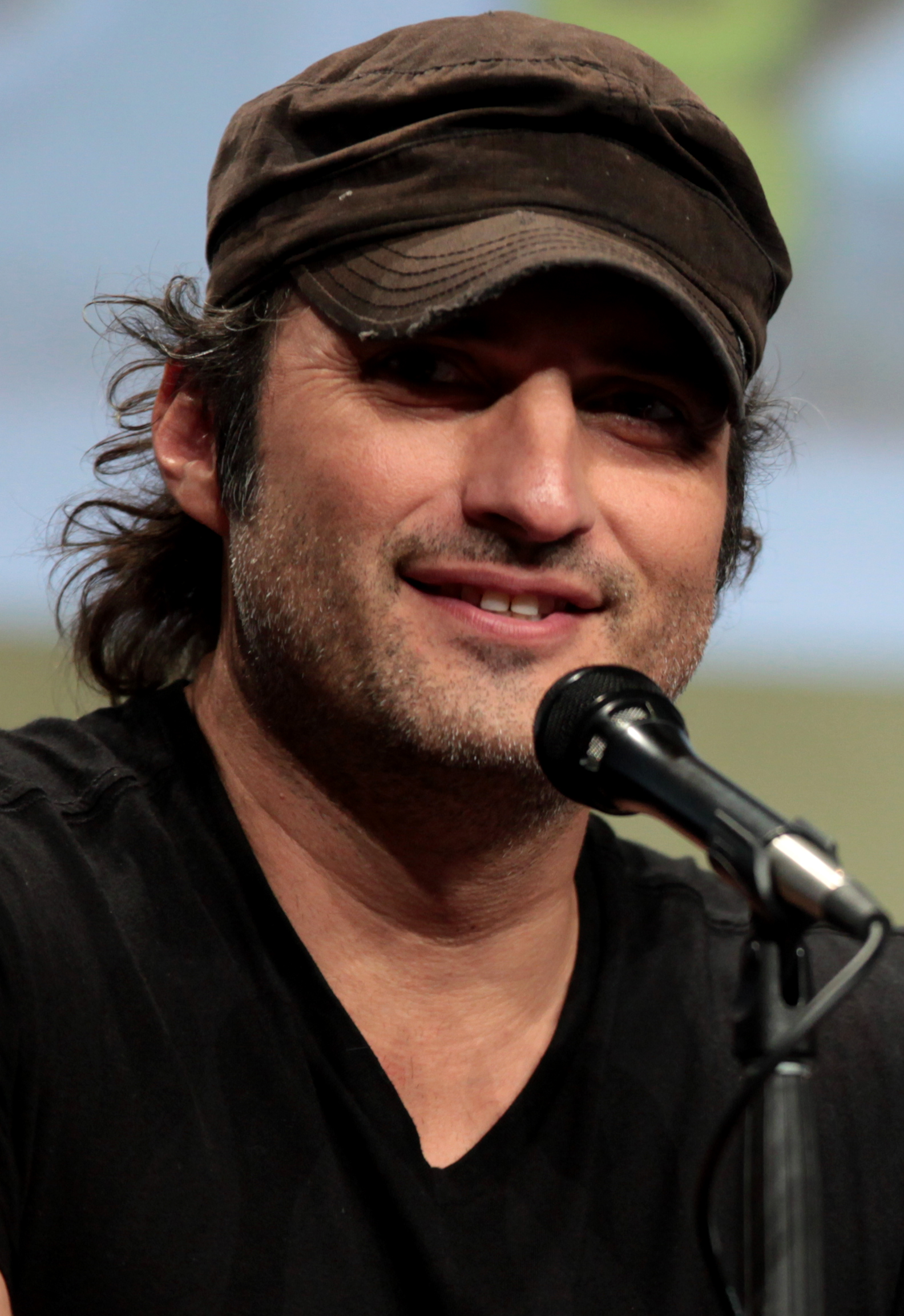
Robert Rodriguez, one of the directors and writers of the series, cameos as the voice for Dokk Strassi and Mayor Mok Shaiz.

Dokk Strassi is the Trandoshan leader of the central and business districts of Mos Espa and is a former employer to Fett when Fett was a bounty hunter. Strassi is one of the leaders who comes to pay tribute to Fett with a Wookiee pelt, as Trandoshans are known for hunting Wookiees. He is also one of the Trandoshans in The Sanctuary when Krrsantan rips one of their arms off. He is also among the group of crime lords when Fett ask for help in the upcoming war against the Pyke Syndicate, but they agree to remain neutral. Strassi ends up betraying Fett by helping the Pykes and eventually dies to Fennec Shand.

Robert Rodriguez, director of the first episode, voices Strassi while Stephen Oyoung physically portrays him. In a conversation with ComicBook.com, Rodriquez said that he struggled to find the right treatment for the character and also said, "Boba was my favorite, so I was really excited I got to do that and just do him."

=== Garfalaquox ===
Garfalaquox is the crime lord of the worker's district in Tatooine, who is of the Aqualish species, a humanoid race with two big eyes, bald heads, and fur on their cheeks, who come from the planet Ando. He comes to bring tribute to Fett when he becomes the new Daimyo of Tatooine. He is also one of the crime lords Fett asks to remain neutral in the upcoming war. After betraying Fett by helping the Pykes, he is killed by Fennec Shand.

Garfalaquox is performed by Barry Lowin, who serves as Pedro Pascal's body double for Din Djarin when Pascal is not around.

=== Gamorrean Guards ===
The two Gamorean Guards are first seen in "Chapter 1: Stranger in a Strange Land", where they give themselves as loyal bodyguards to Boba Fett, when he becomes the new Daimyo of Tatooine. They later help Fett and Shand when the Night Wind assassins attack them and take Fett to his bacta tank. In "Chapter 3: The Streets of Mos Espa", the Guards help defend Fett when he was attacked by Krrsantan. In "Chapter 7: In the Name of Honor", while helping Fett in the war, the two Gamorrean Guards are pushed off a cliff by the Klatooinians, who betray Fett.

Frank Trigg and Collin Hymes play the two Gamorrean Guards.

=== Night Wind Assassin ===
The Night Wind Assassin appears in "Chapter 1: Stranger in a Strange Land" and "Chapter 2: The Tribes of Tatooine". He is part of the group of assassins, who are of the Order of the Night Wind and try to kill Boba Fett. While an injured Fett is being placed in his bacta tank, Shand chases the assassins down killing all but one and brings the remaining assassin to Fett. Not responding, the Night Wind Assassin is asked by Fett who hired him. He finally tells Fett it was Mayor Mok Shaiz, when Fett tricks him by dropping him into the empty rancor cage. Fett brings him to the mayor and the mayor denies hiring him and kills the assassin.

Paul Darnell portrays the Night Wind Assassin.

=== Mayor Mok Shaiz ===
Mayor Mok Shaiz is the Ithorian mayor of Mos Espa on Tatooine. When Boba Fett becomes the Daimyo of Tatooine, instead of coming to give tribute to Fett himself, the mayor sends his majordomo, making Fett unhappy. When Fett confronts the mayor about the assassin who said that he was hired by him, the mayor denies hiring him and has the assassin killed. He is later hanged by Fennec Shand when he betrays Fett and works with the Pykes.

The Mayor is voiced by Robert Rodriguez.

=== Camie and Fixer ===
Camie Marstrap and Laze "Fixer" Loneozner are the couple who are attacked by the Nikto gang. They are saved by Fett, as he steals the gang's speeder bikes.

Skyler Bible portrays Fixer, while Mindy Kowalski portrays Camie. Fixer and Camie were originally supposed to be portrayed by Anthony Forrest and Koo Stark in Star Wars (1977), but the scene was later deleted.

=== Pyke Traveler ===
The Pyke Traveler is the leader of Pyke Syndicates, who run a spice train in the sands of Tatooine that attack the tribe of Tusken Raiders Boba Fett is with. Fett teaches the Tuskens how to ride speeder bikes, and they defeat the Pykes. Fett allows the Pyke Traveler and the remaining Pykes to live, but they must pay protection money to them.

The Pyke Traveler is performed by Alfred Hsing with Stephen Stanton as the uncredited voice of him.

=== Pyke Boss ===
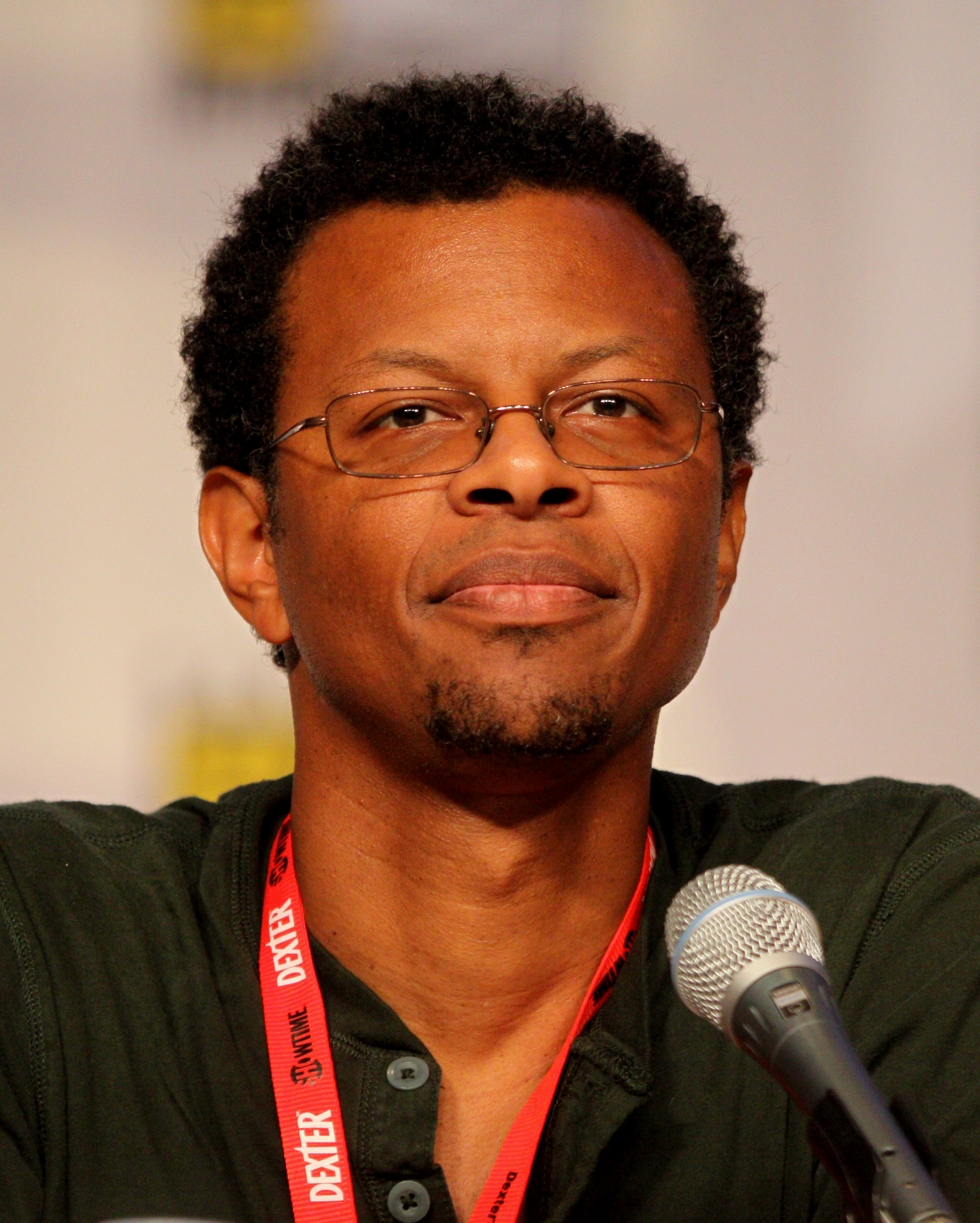
Phil LaMarr does the voice for both the Pyke Boss and the Klatoonian Boss.

The Pyke Boss appears in "Chapter 3: The Streets of Mos Espa", when Fett comes to collect the protection money the Pykes owe the Tuskens. The Pyke Boss refuses to pay the Tuskens, saying that they already pay the Nikto gang. Fett returns to the Tusken camp to see it destroyed by the Pykes, who framed the Nikto gang. The Pyke Boss later meets his demise in "Chapter 7: In the Name of Honor", when he is killed by Shand.

Phil LaMarr provides the voice for the Pyke Boss.

=== Klatooinian Boss ===
The Klatooinian Boss is the crime lord of the starport and upper sprawl in Tatooine. He is of the Klatooinian species, a humanoid race from the planet Klatooine. He is one of the crime lords that agrees to stay neutral in Fett's upcoming war with the Pykes. After betraying Fett by helping the Pykes, he is killed by Fennec Shand.

Phil LaMarr does the voice of the Klatoonian Boss.

=== Bib Fortuna ===
Bib Fortuna is Jabba the Hutt's majordomo who took over his throne after he died. Later, when Fett gets his ship back from Jabba's palace, Fett kills Fortuna and usurps the throne. Matthew Wood portrays Bib Fortuna.

=== Kaba Baiz ===
Kaba Baiz is the Klatooinian gangster who runs a meatpacking company on Glavis Ringworld, a ring station. He has a bounty placed on him by an Ishi Tib and Din Djarin hunts him down, bringing his head back in exchange for the location of his tribe's hideout.

Kaba Baiz is physically portrayed by Ardeshir Radpour.

=== Paz Vizsla ===
Paz Vizsla is a Mandalorian, who is part of the tribe of warriors that is led by the Armorer. After the Armorer explains that Tarre Vizsla, who is an ancestor of Paz, created the Darksaber, Paz challenges Djarin to a duel for the Darksaber, as it can only be won through beating the owner, but loses.

Paz Vizsla is portrayed by Tait Fletcher with Jon Favreau as the uncredited voice of him.

=== Lieutenant Reed and Carson Teva ===
Lieutenant Reed and Captain Carson Teva are the two X-wing pilots, who pull over Djarin while he taking his new Naboo N1 Starfighter for a test run.

Paul Sun-Hyung Lee has portrayed Captain Carson Teva before in The Mandalorian, and Max Lloyd-Jones, who was Luke Skywalker's stand-in for The Mandalorian, portrays Lieutenant Reed.

=== R2-D2 ===
R2-D2 is an astromech droid belonging to Luke Skywalker. He appears in "Chapter 6: From the Desert Comes a Stranger", where he leads Din Djarin to a place where ant-droids are building Luke's new Jedi temple, instead of directly to Luke because he is training Grogu. After Grogu choose to take Djarin's gift, R2-D2 flies Grogu to Peli Motto's space station in Luke's X-wing so Grogu can be returned to Djarin.

=== Deputy Scott ===
Deputy Scott is the assistant to Cobb Vanth in Freetown. When Djarin visits asking for help with the upcoming war against the Pykes, the Deputy gives Djarin a hard time for where he parked his ship. After Djarin leaves, bounty hunter Cad Bane appears and ask Vanth to stay out of the war. Seeing that Vanth is in a standoff with Bane, the Deputy struggles for his gun and gets shot at multiple times by Bane.

Stunt performer JJ Dashnaw portrays the Deputy.

=== Taanti ===
Taanti is the Weequay proprietor who is the bar tender of the bar in Freetown. While Djarin is in the bar discussing with Vanth to join the war, Taanti tells Djarin the town is called Freetown and not Mos Pelgos anymore. After Djarin leaves, Taanti tries to convince Vanth not to join the war. When Cad Bane kills apparently Vanth, Taanti leads the people of Freetown into battle against the Pykes.

W. Earl Brown portrays Taanti.

=== Jo ===
Jo is a citizen of Freetown, who helps Fett during the war by working with Drash.

Jo is portrayed by Karisma Shanel.

== See also ==
- The Mandalorian
- List of The Mandalorian characters
- List of Star Wars characters
- List of Star Wars creatures
- List of Star Wars droid characters
- List of Star Wars Legends characters
- List of Star Wars Rebels characters
- List of Star Wars: Knights of the Old Republic characters
- List of Star Wars cast members
- List of Star Wars: The Clone Wars cast members
- List of Star Wars books
