= Steph Green =

American film director and screenwriter

- Born: 1979 (age 46–47); San Francisco, California, U.S.
- Occupations: Film screenwriter; Television director; Film director; Executive producer
- Years active: 2007–present
- Notable work: The Book of Boba Fett; Watchmen; Run & Jump; New Boy

Steph Green (born 1979) is an American film and television director, screenwriter, and executive producer. Her career began with studies in Ireland and work as an assistant to director Spike Jonze on commercials. Green's breakthrough came with her short film New Boy (2007), which earned an Academy Award nomination.

Green has since directed episodes for numerous television series, including The Americans, Billions, Scandal, and Watchmen. Her work on Watchmen earned her an Emmy Award nomination in 2020. She has also directed episodes of the Star Wars series The Book of Boba Fett and Ahsoka, and the Max series Duster.

== Career ==
Green's journey in filmmaking began with her studies in Ireland, where she pursued a master's degree in film. Her early career included working as an assistant to Spike Jonze on commercials, which led to her directing her own commercials, including the IKEA advert "Cover Up" that received recognition at the 2006 Cannes Film Festival.

In 2007, Green made her debut in the film industry with the short film New Boy, which she both directed and wrote. This project earned an Academy Award nomination for Best Live Action Short Film in 2009. Following this success, Green directed and co-wrote her first feature film, Run & Jump.

Green's television career has included The Americans, Billions, Scandal, Luke Cage, The Deuce, and Watchmen. Her work on the Watchmen episode "Little Fear of Lightning" earned her an Emmy nomination for Outstanding Directing for a Limited Series, Movie or Dramatic Special in 2020.

She directed episodes of the Star Wars series The Book of Boba Fett in 2022 and Ahsoka in 2023. In 2025, she directed and executive produced several episodes of the series Duster.

== Filmography ==
Film

Year	Title	Director	Writer	Notes	Ref.
2007	New Boy	Yes	Yes	Short film	
2013	Run & Jump	Yes	Yes	Feature film debut	

Television

Key
†	Denotes television productions that have not yet been released

Year	Title	Director	Executive Producer	Episode(s)	Ref.
2016-17	Scandal	Yes	No	"Till Death Do Us Part"	
2016-17	Scandal	Yes	No	"The Box"	
2016-17	The Americans	Yes	No	"Munchkins"	
2016-17	The Americans	Yes	No	"Dyatkovo"	
2016	American Gothic	Yes	No	"The Gross Clinic"	
2017	Billions	Yes	No	"Currency"	
2017	American Crime	Yes	No	"Season Three: Episode Four"	
2017	Bates Motel	Yes	No	"Inseparable"	
2017	Preacher	Yes	No	"Dirty Little Secret"	
2017	You're the Worst	Yes	No	"From the Beginning, I Was Screwed"	
2017	You're the Worst	Yes	No	"Like People"	
2018	For the People	Yes	No	"Extraordinary Circumstances"	
2018	Luke Cage	Yes	No	"Straighten It Out"	
2018	Strange Angel	Yes	No	"Evocation of the Elders"	
2018	The Deuce	Yes	No	"Seven-Fifty"	
2018	The Man in the High Castle	Yes	No	"Excess Animus"	
2019	Watchmen	Yes	No	"Little Fear of Lightning"	
2019	The L Word: Generation Q	Yes	Yes	"Let's Do It Again"	
2019	The L Word: Generation Q	Yes	Yes	"LA Times"	
2019	Dare Me	Yes	Yes	"Coup d'État"	
2022	The Book of Boba Fett	Yes	No	"Chapter 2: The Tribes of Tatooine"	
2023	Ahsoka	Yes	No	"Part Two: Toil and Trouble"	
2023	Ahsoka	Yes	No	"Part Three: Time to Fly"	
2025	Duster	Yes	Yes	"Baltimore Changes Everything"	
2025	Duster	Yes	Yes	"Suspicious Mind"	
2025	Duster	Yes	Yes	"Ravishing Light and Glory"	
2025	Duster	Yes	Yes	"Meet By the Clothes"	
2026	The Good Daughter †	Yes	Yes		

== Accolades ==
In 2009, New Boy received a nomination at the 81st Academy Awards for Best Live Action Short Film. The film also received nominations at the Foyle Film Festival, Irish Film & Television Academy, Tribeca Film Festival, and Vail Film Festival. In 2020, the Watchmen episode "Little Fear of Lightning" received a nomination at the 72nd Primetime Emmy Awards for Outstanding Directing for a Limited Series, Movie or Dramatic Special.
