= Black Krrsantan =

Star Wars character

- Star Wars character
- Carey Jones as Black Krrsantan.
- First appearance: Darth Vader #1 (February 2015)
- Created by: Kieron Gillen (writer); Salvador Larroca (artist); Jordan D. White (editor); Heather Antos (editor)
- Portrayed by: Carey Jones (The Book of Boba Fett)

In-universe information
- Nicknames: Black K; BK; Santy; Santo
- Species: Wookiee
- Gender: Male
- Occupation: Bounty hunter; Bodyguard; Gladiator (formerly)
- Affiliation: Xonti Brothers; Hutt Clan; Galactic Empire; Doctor Aphra's crew; Fett gotra
- Homeworld: Kashyyyk

Black Krrsantan, or simply Krrsantan, sometimes Black K, BK or Santo, is a fictional character in the Star Wars franchise. Created by writer Kieron Gillen, artist Salvador Larroca, and editors Jordan D. White and Heather Antos, he first appeared in Marvel Comics' 2015 Darth Vader comic book series as a major antagonist, before returning as a supporting character in its 2016 spin-off comic book series, Star Wars: Doctor Aphra, as well as 2015's ongoing Star Wars comic book series. He made his first live-action appearance in the Disney+ miniseries The Book of Boba Fett (2022), portrayed by Carey Jones.

Black Krrsantan is a fierce Wookiee bounty hunter and former gladiator. He has worked for notorious individuals in the galaxy such as Jabba the Hutt, Darth Vader and Doctor Aphra. Later, he is hired as a bodyguard by the Hutt Twins to kill Boba Fett, his old partner, but is eventually employed by Fett. The character has been widely praised by fans and critics alike.

== Appearances ==
=== Marvel comics ===
Black Krrsantan first appeared in the comic Darth Vader #1 (February 2015), where he and Boba Fett are hired by Jabba the Hutt to help Darth Vader on separate missions on Tatooine. Krrsantan is assigned to hunt down Cylo, a cybernetic agent of Emperor Palpatine and get information from him. He is successful, but did not extract any information out of him, until he brought him to Vader, who got the information out of him by using a torture droid.

Other comics tell more about Black Krrsantan and his past. In them, Black Krrsantan is disgraced by his own kind and is banned from his home planet of Kashyyyk for unknown reasons. After being exiled, he finds the Xonti Brothers, who own slaves and run a gladiator ring, and teach Krrsantan several combat moves and modify his body so he can become a gladiator. They added metal into his knuckles and made him look overall more appealing for slave trade. Black Krrsantan later escapes from being a gladiator and that is when he runs into Jabba the Hutt. After serving many missions for Jabba, in a flashback Star Wars #20, Black Krrsantan goes on a mission for the Hutt to enforce a water tax, but runs into Obi-Wan Kenobi, who is trying to stop the water tax. They get into a brawl, and Kenobi injures the Wookiee by slashing him in the face with his lightsaber, giving him his iconic scar. Seeing that he lost to Obi-Wan, Black Krrsantan leaves Tatooine as he knew Jabba would not be happy. Years later, he comes back, which is when Jabba gives him his job with Darth Vader.

In Star Wars #14, part of the crossover sub-series Star Wars: Vader Down, Black Krrsantan is hired to find Luke Skywalker, but ends up fighting Chewbacca on the planet Vrogas Vas. While fighting, Black Krrsantan gets the upper hand on Chewbacca when Triple-Zero poisons him, but Chewbacca eventually defeats the rogue Wookiee when C-3PO electrocutes him.

In Darth Vader #7, Black Krrsantan is hired by Doctor Aphra, who is a criminal archaeologist, as her bodyguard. Black Krrsantan helps Aphra in one of her biggest heist, steal the treasure of the Son-tuul Pride, a criminal organization that used to have an alliance with the Empire, and help her fight against the Rebel Alliance during the Battle of Hoth. Later, Darth Vader hires Black Krrsantan to track down Aphra and brings her to him. After bringing her to Vader, Cylo attacks the ship, and Black Krrsantan and Aphra escape together, although he later betrays her for the bounty on her head.

=== The Book of Boba Fett ===
Black Krrsantan, simply referred to as Krrsantan, returns in "Chapter 2: The Tribes of Tatooine", when Jabba the Hutt's cousins, the Twins, bring him out as their bodyguard in an attempt to intimidate Boba Fett, who became the new Daimyo of Jabba's criminal empire on Tatooine, into giving back Jabba's land. Fett refuses, and the Twins warn Fett that they will be back.

In "Chapter 3: The Streets of Mos Espa", the Twins send Krrsantan to assassinate Fett. Krrsantan rips Fett out of his bacta tank and starts to attack him. Fett quickly has his newly acquired mod gang help him, and they lead him into the throne room of Fett's palace. Fennec Shand then arrives and traps Krrsantan in the empty rancor cage near Fett's throne. The next day, the Twins come to apologize to Fett, bringing him a rancor and telling him that he can sell Krrsantan to someone. Fett accepts the gift and ignores the Twins' suggestion. He decides to release Krrsantan.

While in The Sanctuary, a cantina owned by Garsa Fwip, Krrsantan sees Trandoshans gambling. He starts to fight them, because of the Trandoshans' backgrounds as Wookiee hunters. While holding one in his arm, Fwip tries to calm him down by helping him remember how he does not need to prove his strength anymore as he was a former gladiator. Fwip also tells him his bar debt is cleared in an attempt to settle things down, but Krrsantan does not listen and rips the arm off the Trandoshans and still hands her credits he took from the Trandoshans. After leaving the cantina, Fett hires him as a bodyguard.

During the war against the Pyke syndicate, Krrsantan guards the central and business district of Mos Espa, which is owned by the Trandoshan leader Dokk Strassi, who told Fett that they would remain neutral in the war. The Trandoshans betray Fett and begin to attack Krrsantan. Krrsantan perseveres through and helps Fett fight off the rest of the Pykes.

=== Video games ===
Alongside Fennec Shand and Boba Fett, Krrsantan was released as an outfit in the video game Fortnite Battle Royale. He also appears as an unlockable character in the mobile game turn-based role-playing game Star Wars: Galaxy of Heroes.

== Characteristics ==
Black Krrsantan is a black-furred Wookiee, which are humanoid aliens that hail from the planet Kashyyyk and are known for being tall, hairy, and having immense strength. He wears gold armor with spikes on his shoulders. For weapons, he has electrical brass knuckles, a powerful firearm, and a bowcaster. Black Krrsantan's fighting style tends to lean towards a dark side. Unlike other Wookiees, he will use his teeth and break loyalties to win a fight. Alex Zaben of Decider has described him to be more dangerous than Chewbacca. Black Krrsantan proves his strength, when he rips off the arm of a Trandoshan, and when he overpowers several Trandoshans who jump on top of him. He also displays his toughness from the scar on his face that goes over his left eye, which he got from Obi-Wan Kenobi's lightsaber when he fought him. Rachel Leishman of The Mary Sue called him an "imposing figure" with a "threatening gaze". He cares very little for anyone else and looks out only for himself. He has several nicknames, and is called Black K, BK, and Santy by Doctor Aphra and Santo by Boba Fett and Garsa Fwip.

== Development ==
Black Krrsantan was created shortly after Disney acquired Lucasfilm and declared in January 2014, that the Star Wars comics license would return to Marvel Comics in 2015. Created by writer Kieron Gillen, artist Salvador Larroca, and editors Jordan D. White and Heather Antos, he made his first appearance in the comic Darth Vader #1 (February 2015). During the creation process for Krrsantan, Gillen said that they referred to him as "Newbacca", in reference to Chewbacca, while trying to figure out a name for him. Black Krrsantan later made his first live-action appearance in The Book of Boba Fett portrayed by Carey Jones.

== Reception ==
=== Critical reception ===
Black Krrsantan has been praised by critics. Rachel Leishman of The Mary Sue stated "We're all a little in love with him after just one meeting", after his first appearance in The Book of Boba Fett. MovieWeb's Evadne Hendrix ranked Black Krrsantan the 2nd best Wookiee in the Star Wars Universe. Stating, "With a dark look and sinister reputation, Black Krrsantan solidifies his spot as one of the galaxy's most feared bounty hunters", Screen Rant's J. Richland Aderson named Krrsantan the 4th most feared bounty in Star Wars. Brenton Stewart gave the title for the most interesting character on The Book of Boba Fett to Krrsantan saying, "He has a cool design... and an intriguing and imagination-provoking background, with both gladiators and bounty hunters earning instant cool points for any character where their combination only puts him over the top." While ranking Krrsantan as the 9th best character in The Book of Boba Fett, Nick Bartlett of /Film said, "It's refreshing to see a more antagonistic Wookiee character." Eric Francisco of Inverse praised the Wookiee, calling him "one of the most fearsome characters to ever carry a blaster". He also said that Black Krrsantan is one of "the scariest characters in Star Wars history" and said that his "intimidating presence" makes The Book of Boba Fett a treat.

=== Merchandise ===
A 6-inch action figure of Black Krrsantan's appearance in the Marvel comics was released by Hasbro in their toy line of Star Wars: The Black Series.
