= Doctor Aphra =

Star Wars character

- Star Wars character
- Doctor Aphra, as drawn by Rod Reis on the variant cover of Doctor Aphra (2016) #25
- First appearance: Star Wars: Darth Vader #3; (March 25, 2015)
- Created by: Kieron Gillen (writer); Salvador Larroca (artist); Jordan D. White (editor); Heather Antos (editor)
- Voiced by: January LaVoy (From a Certain Point of View, audiobook); Emily Woo Zeller (Doctor Aphra: An Audiobook Original)

In-universe information
- Full name: Chelli Lona Aphra
- Title: Doctor
- Occupation: Archaeologist
- Affiliation: Darth Vader; Palpatine; 0-0-0; BT-1
- Family: Korin Aphra (father); Lona Aphra (mother)
- Significant others: Magna Tolvan; Sana Starros
- Homeworld: Arbiflux

Chelli Lona Aphra, or simply Doctor Aphra, is a fictional character in the Star Wars franchise. Created by writer Kieron Gillen, artist Salvador Larroca, and editors Jordan D. White and Heather Antos, she first appeared in Marvel Comics' 2015 Darth Vader comic book series. Aphra became a breakout character, and began appearing in her own ongoing spin-off comic series, Star Wars: Doctor Aphra, from 2016 to 2019, before relaunching in 2020. Aphra is the first original Star Wars character not from the films to lead a canon comic series.

Aphra is a morally questionable, criminal archaeologist initially employed by Darth Vader in his efforts to replace Palpatine as leader of the Galactic Empire, who later goes into hiding from the former after betraying him to the latter and faking her death, briefly establishing a love–hate relationship with Imperial officer Magna Tolvan. Supported by droids 0-0-0 and BT-1, and later by her former romantic partner Sana Starros, she is considered a war criminal by the Rebel Alliance. Aphra is notable as one of the first and most prominent and well known LGBTQ Star Wars characters.

== Character ==
Doctor Aphra is a criminal archaeologist with an expert knowledge of droid and weapons technologies, with a particular interest in ancient weapons and Jedi artifacts. She travels in a unique starship called the Ark Angel, which features a custom white-and-blue paint job. StarWars.com describes Aphra as "a (mostly) morally bankrupt, in-over-her-head archaeologist" with an Asian appearance. Slate calls her "driven, selfish, decisive, and wildly unpredictable". SyFy Wire calls the character an anti-hero who "shares the snark of Han Solo and sexual charisma of Lando Calrissian, but toes the line between right and wrong far more regularly than these two characters—and more often than not steps over it into the downright naughty." IGN explains, "Aphra has all of Han's swaggery, scoundrel-y charm, but little of his noble streak." Creator Kieron Gillen notes that the character's main interest is "this weird obsession she has with uncovering old stuff".

Noting that "Aphra's sarcasm and the careful way she codes her words are a vital part of her character", StarWars.com also explains that though she is somewhat of a genius, Aphra's ability to think on her toes is what has kept her alive in situations where her genius fails her. Gillen notes that readers can never be sure what the character will or will not do. Doctor Aphra writer Si Spurrier explains that despite the expectation that Star Wars characters "will always do the right thing", Aphra makes mistakes and sometimes chooses the unexpected. Sarah Kuhn, the author of Doctor Aphra: An Audiobook Original, agreed that "[Aphra] is the definition of chaos ... You never really know exactly what she's going to do, which means that, personally, I think she's having the most fun of anyone in the Star Wars galaxy."

In creating the character, Gillen wrote: "The core idea came when walking around the Lucasfilm offices. We passed a large Indiana Jones display and I just thought, 'gender and ethically-switched Indiana Jones. That'd work well in Star Wars.'" Gillen added that Aphra falls somewhere between a hero and a villain in that "You do see her do good things and bad things... she's kind of fun but at the same time, there's a really dark heart to her." He added:

Aphra ... was designed to be Darth Vader's foil ... she has to do a lot of the talking when Darth Vader doesn't. Darth Vader will not make jokes. To be even a fun book to read, you need her to lighten it. But when you introduce her as a lead, that kind of changes the dynamic entirely. A) she becomes slightly more serious, and B) everyone else around her becomes a lot more deadly.

Spurrier states that Aphra "knows that Vader is probably not a nice person. She's aware that space fascism is not necessarily a good thing but it may be the right thing for a chaotic universe." Gillen compares Aphra to Darth Vader in that fans root for both as anti-heroes, but explains that while Aphra is a "bad person in many ways", Vader is on another level as "one of the greatest villains of all time." Gillen further explains, "you can root [for her], because she makes really bad life decisions and sort of rolls with them ... She doesn't like killing people. She's not like a random murderer." He noted that Aphra is complex in that she is "adamantly pro-Empire" but tends not to obey its rules.

SyFy Wire describes Aphra as a "queer woman of color". Slate notes, "She aches for two different women who have claims to her heart—two women whom, inevitably, she must betray to survive." Gillen has confirmed Aphra's sexuality, saying he has written her primarily romantically interested in women (and as flirting with Luke Skywalker), but noted that real-world attitudes towards homosexuality "[don't] really exist in the Star Wars universe". Of Aphra's doomed relationship with female Imperial captain Magna Tolvan, Gillen said he imagined "This hard-bitten, kind of very serious kind of person chasing down this more whimsical person and the sexual tension ... the flip of it is, Aphra's the person who's also pursuing Tolvan."

== Appearances ==
=== Comics ===
==== Darth Vader (2015–2016) ====
Aphra first appeared in issue #3 of Star Wars: Darth Vader (March 2015), which is set after the original Star Wars film and was created by writer Kieron Gillen and artist Salvador Larroca. Aphra's appearance in the comic was adapted as an audiobook released on July 21, 2020. In the story, she is recruited by Darth Vader to aid in his schemes. At the end of the series, Vader attempts to kill Aphra after she betrays him to Palpatine, but she escapes, leaving him thinking he succeeded. Gillen had originally planned to have Vader kill Aphra during the story, but realized a way that she could escape and still keep the integrity of both characters.

From 2015 to 2016, Aphra appeared in Star Wars: Vader Down, a six-issue crossover comic miniseries which includes its own debut issue, issues #13–15 of Darth Vader, and issues #13–14 of the Star Wars comic series. Concurrent with the Darth Vader series, in 2016 Aphra also appeared in the Rebel Jail arc of the Star Wars comic, which comprises Star Wars issues #16–19.

==== Doctor Aphra (2016–2019) ====
After first being teased in September 2016 as Star Wars: Classified, Star Wars: Doctor Aphra was announced in October 2016, and debuted in December 2016. The story picks up after Vader's attempt to kill Aphra at the end of the Darth Vader series. She is in hiding so that Vader will not discover that she is alive, but needs to get back into her life as an archaeologist so she can repay her enormous debts to the Wookiee Black Krrsantan, and fulfill her promise to help locate the people who tortured him in the past. Gillen said he wanted to write the series to explore "what makes her tick and why she's doing what she's doing". Gillen wrote issues #1 to #13, and then cowrote #14 to #19 with Simon Spurrier.

Spurrier took over for a departing Gillen as of #20. Larroca and Kev Walker shared the artwork for issue #1, with Walker doing it alone for #2 and #3, followed by Walker and various other artists rotating in and out of the series. Spurrier refocused the series to expand Aphra's adventures past the known Star Wars universe and attempt to tell stories that would be unique to Aphra's character.

The series was nominated for Outstanding Comic Book at the 30th GLAAD Media Awards. Alan Scherstuhl of Slate wrote of the series, "The stories, like Death Stars, tend to explode, but unpredictably so, with escalating twists, striking moral quandaries, and only occasionally anything like a truly happy ending." He explains, "Besides the vigorous storytelling and startling twists, the Doctor Aphra comics ... fill in shades of gray that are otherwise missing from Star Wars' moral spectrum." Jesse Schedeen of IGN called Doctor Aphra "Marvel's riskiest Star Wars project to date", but noted that "the distance from the movies gives Doctor Aphra a greater sense of freedom in terms of tone, style and plot possibilities." Schedeen described the series as "very much like a Bizarro Han Solo story with a dash of Indiana Jones thrown in", and noted that it "thrives on its dark sense of humor."

In 2017, Aphra appeared in the five-issue crossover miniseries The Screaming Citadel, which is made up of its own debut issue, issues #31–32 of Star Wars, and issues #7–8 of Doctor Aphra. The initial Doctor Aphra series ended in December 2019 with issue #40. She is also the main subject of in the short comic "Epilogue", also collected in the Empire Ascendant one-shot comic, which is in turn collected in the thirteenth volume of Marvel's Star Wars series.

In 2020, the series won a GLAAD Media Award for Outstanding Comic Book.

==== Doctor Aphra (2020–2024) ====
Doctor Aphra relaunched in 2020, and is set between The Empire Strikes Back and Return of the Jedi. The first issue was released digitally on May 3 (in recognition of Star Wars Day) and physically on May 27. In the series, she would meet team up with her old flame, Sana Starros, work for the Tagge Corporation, led by Domina Tagge, and face off against another one of her exes, Kho Phon Farrus. She would also nearly die, be resurrected by an entity known as the Spark, and be saved by Starros, Farrus, her on-and-off-again girlfriend, Magna Tolvan, and others. In June 2022, Wong said that writing for the series felt like a "celebration of queer people and our friendships and enmities and relationships of all kinds" and called it "really refreshing." The fortieth and final issue was released on January 31, 2024. The series ended with Aphra in a romantic relationship with Sana Starros and Magna Tolvan. The series won the GLAAD Media Award for Outstanding Comic Book in 2024.

==== Doctor Aphra: Chaos Agent (2025) ====
A new comics series launched in June 2025, set in the New Republic phase of the Star Wars timeline, shortly after the events of Return of the Jedi. Written by Cherish Chen, with art from Gabriel Guzman, the series begins with Luke Skywalker recruiting Aphra, when Chen saying that Aphra is the same as fans know her, but has had to deal with "unexpected consequences...in the aftermath of the Empire falling apart" and called Aphra a "fun character" and "chaos agent". The series ended after five issues.

==== Other comics ====
Aphra appears in flashbacks in issues of the 2019 comic Star Wars: Galaxy's Edge, as well as in the first issue of the comic series Star Wars: Bounty Hunters (2020–2024), and mentioned in the third. Additionally, she appeared in five issues of the 2021 War of the Bounty Hunters miniseries, in issues 1 and 2 of "Republic Under Siege", part of Star Wars: The Battle of Jakku, written by Alex Segura, in 2024 and in two issues of Star Wars: A New Legacy #1, by Kieron Gillen, the writer who first introduced Aphra, the same year. While "Star Wars: The Battle of Jakku" and "Star Wars: Galaxy's Edge" was set during the "New Republic" phase of Star Wars chronology, Star Wars: Bounty Hunters, War of the Bounty Hunters, and Star Wars: A New Legacy during the "Galactic Empire" phase of Star Wars chronology.

==== Other appearances ====
In May 2017, Heather Antos, a co-creator of Aphra, expressed interest in a crossover series between Aphra and Gwen Poole, a Marvel character she had co-created for The Unbelievable Gwenpool. She depicted the duo as being best friends, with some fans sharing fanart of the two together, and she commissioned fan art of the characters together, which she later shared it on social media in July 2021.

Black Krrsantan, introduced in the same Darth Vader comic as Aphra (and returning in Doctor Aphra), was introduced to the live-action Star Wars universe in the second episode of the streaming series The Book of Boba Fett.

In 2026, Star Wars: Legacy, by Madeleine Roux, also featured the planet Tython, which was introduced in Doctor Aphra #40, which came out in December 2019. The same year, interconnecting covers for Pride Month for Marvel's three Star Wars releases, in June 2026 (Star Wars: Rogue One – Jyn Erso, Shadow of Maul #4, and Galaxy’s Edge – Echoes of the Empire #3), featured Aphra and seventeen other LGBTQ+ characters in the Star Wars franchise, including Just Lucky and Ariole Yu, who appeared in Aphra's second run, and Aphra's on-and-off girlfriend, Sana Starros.

==== Collected editions ====
===== Doctor Aphra (2016) =====
#	Subtitle	Issues collected	Format	Writers	Artists	Pages	Released	ISBN
Paperbacks
1	Aphra	Star Wars: Doctor Aphra (2016) #1–6	TPB	Kieron Gillen	Kev Walker	152	July 3, 2017	Kamome Shirahama issue #1 cover: 978-1302906771
	The Screaming Citadel	The Screaming Citadel; Star Wars (2015) #31–32; Doctor Aphra (2016) #7–8	TPB	Kieron Gillen, Jason Aaron	Marco Checchetto, Salvador Larroca, Andrea Broccardo	136	October 24, 2017	Marco Checchetto Screaming Citadel cover: 978-1302906788
2	Doctor Aphra And The Enormous Profit	Star Wars: Doctor Aphra (2016) #9–13, Annual #1	TPB	Kieron Gillen	Kev Walker, Marc Laming	168	February 20, 2018	Kamome Shirahama issue #10 cover: 978-1302907631
3	Remastered	Star Wars: Doctor Aphra (2016) #14–19	TPB	Kieron Gillen, Simon Spurrier	Emilio Laiso	136	July 10, 2018	Ashley Witter issue #19 cover: 978-1302911522
4	The Catastrophe Con	Star Wars: Doctor Aphra (2016) #20–25	TPB	Simon Spurrier	Kev Walker	136	January 8, 2019	Ashley Witter issue #20 cover: 978-1302911539
5	Worst Among Equals	Star Wars: Doctor Aphra (2016) #26–31, Annual #2	TPB	Simon Spurrier	Emilio Laiso	168	June 25, 2019	Ashley Witter issue #29 cover: 978-1302914875
6	Unspeakable Rebel Superweapon	Star Wars: Doctor Aphra (2016) #32–36	TPB	Simon Spurrier	Wilton Santos, Caspar Wijngaard, Andrea Broccardo	120	December 11, 2019	Ashley Witter issue #36 cover: 978-1302914882
7	A Rogue's End	Star Wars: Doctor Aphra (2016) #37–40, Annual #3; material from Star Wars: Empire Ascendant (2019)	TPB	Simon Spurrier	Caspar Wijngaard, Elsa Charretier	128	February 11, 2020	Ashley Witter issue #37 cover: 978-1302919092
Hardcovers
	Star Wars: Doctor Aphra	Doctor Aphra #1–8; Star Wars: The Screaming Citadel; Star Wars (2015) #31–32	OHC	Kieron Gillen, Jason Aaron	Kev Walker, Marco Checchetto, Salvador Larroca, Andrea Broccardo	272	September 19, 2018	Kamome Shirahama issue #3 cover: 978-1302913212
1	Star Wars: Doctor Aphra Vol. 1	Star Wars: Doctor Aphra (2016) #1–40, Annual #1–3; Darth Vader (2015) #3–4, 8, 21; Star Wars (2015) #13, 19, 31–32; Star Wars: The Screaming Citadel; material from Darth Vader (2015) #25 and Star Wars: Empire Ascendant	Omnibus	Kieron Gillen, Simon Spurrier	Kev Walker, Salvador Larroca, Andrea Broccardo, Emilio Laiso, Mark Laming, Will Sliney, Caspar Wijngaard, Wilton Santos	1,240	February 24, 2021	Ashley Witter cover: 978-1302928438
1	Star Wars: Doctor Aphra Vol. 1	Star Wars: Doctor Aphra (2016) #1–40, Annual #1–3; Darth Vader (2015) #3–4, 8, 21; Star Wars (2015) #13, 19, 31–32; Star Wars: The Screaming Citadel; material from Darth Vader (2015) #25 and Star Wars: Empire Ascendant	Omnibus	Kieron Gillen, Simon Spurrier	Kev Walker, Salvador Larroca, Andrea Broccardo, Emilio Laiso, Mark Laming, Will Sliney, Caspar Wijngaard, Wilton Santos	1,240	February 24, 2021	Rod Reis DM cover: 978-1302928445
1	Star Wars: Doctor Aphra Vol. 1	Star Wars: Doctor Aphra (2016) #1–40, Annual #1–3; Darth Vader (2015) #3–4, 8, 21; Star Wars (2015) #13, 19, 31–32; Star Wars: The Screaming Citadel; material from Darth Vader (2015) #25 and Star Wars: Empire Ascendant	Omnibus	Kieron Gillen, Simon Spurrier	Kev Walker, Salvador Larroca, Andrea Broccardo, Emilio Laiso, Mark Laming, Will Sliney, Caspar Wijngaard, Wilton Santos	1,240	January 31, 2023	Ashley Witter cover: 978-1302947941
1	Star Wars: Doctor Aphra Vol. 1	Star Wars: Doctor Aphra (2016) #1–40, Annual #1–3; Darth Vader (2015) #3–4, 8, 21; Star Wars (2015) #13, 19, 31–32; Star Wars: The Screaming Citadel; material from Darth Vader (2015) #25 and Star Wars: Empire Ascendant	Omnibus	Kieron Gillen, Simon Spurrier	Kev Walker, Salvador Larroca, Andrea Broccardo, Emilio Laiso, Mark Laming, Will Sliney, Caspar Wijngaard, Wilton Santos	1,240	January 31, 2023	Rod Reis DM cover: 978-1302947958

===== Doctor Aphra (2020) =====
#	Subtitle	Issues collected	Format	Writers	Artists	Pages	Released	ISBN
Paperbacks
1	Fortune And Fate	Doctor Aphra (2020) #1–5	TPB	Alyssa Wong	Marika Cresta	168	January 26, 2021	Valentina Remenar issue #1 cover: 978-1302923044
2	The Engine Job	Doctor Aphra (2020) #6–10	TPB	Alyssa Wong	Ray-Anthony Height, Robert Gill	112	August 10, 2021	Joshua Swaby issue #7 cover: 978-1302923051
3	War Of The Bounty Hunters	Doctor Aphra (2020) #11–15	TPB	Alyssa Wong	Minkyu Jung	112	December 14, 2021	Sara Pichelli issue #12 cover: 978-1302928797
4	Crimson Reign	Doctor Aphra (2020) #16–20	TPB	Alyssa Wong	Minkyu Jung	120	October 25, 2022	Sara Pichelli issue #17 cover: 978-1302933029
5	The Spark Eternal	Doctor Aphra (2020) #21–25	TPB	Alyssa Wong	Minkyu Jung	120	December 27, 2022	W. Scott Forbes issue #22 cover: 978-0785194781
6	Ascendant	Doctor Aphra (2020) #26–31	TPB	Alyssa Wong	Minkyu Jung	144	August 1, 2023	Rachael Stott issue #31 cover: 978-1302948030
7	Dark Droids	Doctor Aphra (2020) #32–40; Star Wars: Revelations (B story)	TPB	Alyssa Wong	Derrick Chew	200	April 23, 2024	Derrick Chew issue #36 cover: 978-1302948047
Omnibuses
2	Star Wars: Doctor Aphra Vol. 2	Star Wars: Doctor Aphra (2020) #1–25	Omnibus	Alyssa Wong	Marika Cresta, Ray-Anthony Height, Minkyu Jung	560	August 29, 2023	Valentina Remenar cover: 978-1302949990
2	Star Wars: Doctor Aphra Vol. 2	Star Wars: Doctor Aphra (2020) #1–25	Omnibus	Alyssa Wong	Marika Cresta, Ray-Anthony Height, Minkyu Jung	560	August 29, 2023	Joshua Swaby DM cover: 978-1302950002
3	Star Wars: Doctor Aphra: Friends & Enemies	Star Wars: Doctor Aphra (2020) #26–40; Star Wars Revelations (Aphra story); Star Wars: Sana Starros #1–5	Omnibus	Alyssa Wong, Justina Ireland	Minkyu Jung, Pere Pérez	472	December 2, 2025	Jung-Geun Yoon cover: 978-1302961305
3	Star Wars: Doctor Aphra: Friends & Enemies	Star Wars: Doctor Aphra (2020) #26–40; Star Wars Revelations (Aphra story); Star Wars: Sana Starros #1–5	Omnibus	Alyssa Wong, Justina Ireland	Minkyu Jung, Pere Pérez	472	December 2, 2025	Betsy Cola DM cover: 978-1302961312

===== Doctor Aphra (2025) =====
#	Subtitle	Issues collected	Format	Writers	Artists	Pages	Released	ISBN
Paperbacks
1	Chaos Agent	Doctor Aphra (2025) #1–10	TPB	Cherish Chen	Gabriel Guzman, Steven Cummings	TBC	May 19, 2026	E.J. Su issue #1 cover: 978-1302963224

=== Audiobook ===
An expanded audiobook adaptation of Aphra's introduction in the Darth Vader series, titled Doctor Aphra: An Audiobook Original, was released on July 21, 2020. Written by Sarah Kuhn, the audio drama added new scenes and featured a full voice cast, with Emily Woo Zeller voicing Doctor Aphra. The script was released in book form on April 6, 2021. Kuhn told Starwars.com that Aphra was "immediate chaos" and that she had a "visceral reaction to her right away," loving her character, praised the voice acting of Zeller, and said that the relationship between Aphra and Sana Starros intrigued her due to the chemistry between the characters.

=== Short story ===
==== "The Trigger" (2017) ====
"The Trigger" is a short story written by Gillen, published in the 2017 Star Wars anthology From a Certain Point of View. Set during the 1977 Star Wars film on the day that the Empire destroys the planet Alderaan with the Death Star, the story finds Aphra captured by Imperial troops and reacting to the news of Alderaan's destruction. Slate noted:

Her reaction to the news is complex: She's awed, even a little turned on, at the thought of such destructive might. She annoys the Imperials by excitedly gaming out what tech could have possibly achieved it. She wonders aloud whether the Death Star has a "trigger"—whether any one person flipped the switch that murdered billions. She wonders if killing that many from a distance is easier than killing one person in front of you.

Gillen said he wrote the story with the intent of "working out a fairly logical reason, why with her background, she thinks the Empire is bad to the alternative. If you grew up in a galactic civil war, I think peace by any means might be better than war. That's kind of Aphra's take. Aphra can handle everything. She lies to herself. But normal people? Normal people would probably like to live under a fascist regime rather than actually people just killing each other in a war. And that's a really dark hole to think about but I can buy someone believing that with Aphra's background."

=== Video game ===
Doctor Aphra is a playable character in the 2015 collectible RPG game Star Wars: Galaxy of Heroes, released on mobile devices by Electronic Arts.

Doctor Aphra was a playable character in the 2017 player versus player real-time strategy mobile game, Star Wars: Force Arena, developed by Netmarble Games and published by Lucasfilm.

== Impact and reception ==
Increased sales of Darth Vader #3 convinced Gillen of Doctor Aphra's instant popularity, and he called the character "a big part" of the unexpected success of the Darth Vader series. Aphra became a breakout character, and was placed in her own series, Doctor Aphra, which is the first ongoing Marvel Star Wars comic focused on an original character not from the films. Gillen said in April 2018, "[Doctor Aphra] was the number two trade in February. A completely new character selling that well is shocking in comics. That kind of response is enormously impressive, as it doesn't happen often." He added, "Sal[vador Larroca] and I cooked her up but enough people have written her now to make [her] bigger than me. She definitely feels like she's outgrown me, essentially. So I quite like giving her away to other people who'll get to play with her." Aphra has also become a popular cosplay. Gillen said of Aphra's popularity:

Of all the characters I've created for other people's universes, she's by far the most successful one ... She's kind of fun but at the same time, there's a really dark heart to her ... All those weird kind of contradictions to her, I think they're quite appealing. At the same time, she's got a very core thing people can get. She's quite complicated and not complicated at all. With Luke or Leia, they've got that core archetype you get, you get what they're like. You get that with Aphra but at the same time, there's an underlying ... all this weird, twisted stuff in there that kind of gets under people's skin."

Spurrier added:

Most of what we've seen so far in Star Wars is goodies versus baddies. And Aphra ain't that. And I would suggest that the reason people ... respond more to Han Solo than they respond to Luke Skywalker is because he's not just playing the goodie. He's a little more complicated than that. And Aphra is 100% the same but from the other direction."

Trent Moore of SyFy Wire deemed Aphra "arguably the best thing" about the Darth Vader series, and Catrina Dennis of StarWars.com calls her "the type of character that steals every scene she's in." Hanna Flint of SyFy Wire describes Aphra as "an edgy, cool and refreshingly diverse character", and Bria Lavorgna of StarWars.com calls her "one of the coolest characters in Star Wars right now." Noting that Aphra's first appearance was an homage to Indiana Jones, Alan Scherstuhl of Slate states that she subsequently "gains a depth that Indiana Jones never quite did", and praised the fact that Gillen has "never exploited or exoticized her sexuality." Citing Aphra's "feats of technological prowess coupled with her unpredictable personality" as the characteristics which "make her a character worth watching", Dennis writes, "Aphra has stolen the hearts of fans everywhere with her unpredictable humor and a complicated backstory that has unfolded into something much more than her introduction to the saga may have let on."

TJ Mills of ScreenRant called Aphra a "morally questionable archaeologist and rogue adventurer" and noted the connection to Indiana Jones, recommending the character, and related series, to fans of that character. Mills also called Aphra "the perfect leading character" and said that her character "brought more LGBTQ+ representation to the franchise," leading to more "inclusive storytelling" throughout the franchise. James Troughton of CBR had similar observations, saying that she is a "more morally complex take on Indiana Jones," is a lesbian who is attracted to Sana Starros, Magna Tolvan, and Sister Six, and is not a hero or villain.

Some fans have cosplayed as Aphra. Alyssa Wong said it was "surreal" to see a shirt with Aphra, noting they saw cosplayers at conventions, calling it "wild", "crazy", and "cool". In 2017, Starwars.com interviewed multiple Aphra cosplayers, who described Aphra as inspirational, empowering, "ruthless yet human," "snarky," charming, fearless. Brian Colucci of Screenrant stated that cosplay of Aphra showed the live-action potential of the character.

== Merchandising ==
In 2018, Hasbro released an action figure set of Doctor Aphra and her two killer droids, 0-0-0 and BT-1. Doctor Aphra and her two droids have also appeared in the Star Wars: The Black Series line of 6" action figures, which were re-issued in 2024. Her droids also appear as 1/6th scale figures produced by Hot Toys.
