= New Boy (film) =

- Poster
- Directed by: Steph Green
- Screenplay by: Steph Green
- Story by: Roddy Doyle
- Produced by: Tamara Anghie
- Starring: Olutunji Ebun-Cole; Norma Sheahan; Simon O'Driscoll; Fionn O'Shea; Sinead Maguire
- Cinematography: P.J. Dillon
- Edited by: Lee Hickey
- Music by: Len Arran
- Distributed by: Network Ireland Television (IE)
- Release date: 2007
- Running time: 11 minutes
- Country: Ireland
- Language: English
- Budget: €74,000 (estimated)

New Boy is a 2007 Irish short film based on the short story by Irish novelist, dramatist and screenwriter, Roddy Doyle. It received an Academy Award nomination for Best Live Action Short Film. The film is about a young boy's experience as he moves from a rural town in Africa to Ireland: a new country, a different school system and a whole new set of customs.

== Plot ==
Joseph is the new student at a school in Ireland, having just moved from an unidentified country in Africa. Throughout the film he is silent, in deep contrast to the flashbacks of his life back in Africa where he is bright and talkative. In these flashbacks where Joseph's father is the schoolteacher, it is revealed that his father was shot and killed for educating young children.

Joseph struggles to fit in with the other students. In particular, two boys named Seth Quinn and Christian Kelly give him trouble; Christian sits behind Joseph in the classroom and calls him Live Aid, a reference to the benefit concert to raise funds for relief of the Ethiopian Famine. Christian goads Joseph into grabbing onto his finger and throwing him to the ground, getting Joseph into trouble.

A girl named Hazel O'Hara has caught Joseph's interest. She repeatedly tells the teacher that Christian has been giving Joseph trouble yet the teachers pay barely any heed. When the children go out for recess, milk is thrown at Joseph before he is surrounded by a throng of children. Seth and Christian attempt to fight Joseph before the teacher intercepts them.

As the three boys stand in the hallway, they begin to bond by mocking the teacher's eccentric ways. They laugh as Hazel attempts to persuade the teacher that Christian is guilty. Joseph finally smiles, knowing he has now made friends.
