= The Book of Boba Fett =

American television miniseries

- Also known as: Star Wars: The Book of Boba Fett
- Genre: Action-adventure; Space Western
- Created by: Jon Favreau
- Based on: Star Wars by George Lucas
- Showrunner: Jon Favreau
- Starring: Temuera Morrison; Ming-Na Wen; Pedro Pascal
- Theme music composer: Ludwig Göransson
- Composer: Joseph Shirley
- Country of origin: United States
- Original language: English
- No. of seasons: 1
- No. of episodes: 7

Production
- Executive producers: Jon Favreau; Dave Filoni; Robert Rodriguez; Kathleen Kennedy; Colin Wilson
- Producer: John Bartnicki
- Production location: Los Angeles, California
- Cinematography: Dean Cundey; David Klein; Paul Hughen
- Editors: Jeff Seibenick; Dylan Firshein; Andrew S. Eisen; Dana E. Glauberman
- Running time: 39–59 minutes
- Production companies: Lucasfilm; Golem Creations

Original release
- Network: Disney+
- Release: December 29, 2021 – February 9, 2022

Related
- The Mandalorian; Ahsoka; Star Wars: Skeleton Crew

The Book of Boba Fett, also known as Star Wars: The Book of Boba Fett, is an American space Western television miniseries created by Jon Favreau for the streaming service Disney+. It is part of the Star Wars franchise and a spin-off from The Mandalorian, taking place in the same timeframe as that series and its other interconnected spin-offs after the events of the film Return of the Jedi (1983). The Book of Boba Fett follows bounty hunter Boba Fett from The Mandalorian and other Star Wars media as he establishes himself as the new crime lord of Jabba the Hutt's former territory.

Temuera Morrison stars as the title character, with Ming-Na Wen and Pedro Pascal also starring. All reprise their roles from The Mandalorian and other Star Wars media. A standalone Star Wars film centered on Boba Fett was in early development at Lucasfilm before the company began prioritizing streaming series such as The Mandalorian. A potential spin-off series was first reported in November 2020 and was officially announced in December. Filming had begun by that point and lasted until June 2021. In addition to Favreau, Dave Filoni, Kathleen Kennedy, and Colin Wilson returned from The Mandalorian as executive producers and were joined by Robert Rodriguez, who directed three episodes. Favreau and Rodriguez served as showrunners.

The Book of Boba Fett premiered on December 29, 2021, and ran for seven episodes until February 9, 2022. The final episode had the highest viewership for a Star Wars series on Disney+ at that point. The series received mixed reviews from critics, who praised Morrison's performance but criticized some storytelling decisions, including the choice to focus on Pascal's the Mandalorian for multiple episodes. The series received several accolades including a Primetime Creative Arts Emmy Award for its visual effects.

== Premise ==
Mercenaries Boba Fett and Fennec Shand attempt to make a name for themselves in the galaxy's underworld by taking over the territory once controlled by Jabba the Hutt on Tatooine. Fett calls upon the Mandalorian, Din Djarin, to help consolidate his power while Djarin's ward Grogu trains to be a Jedi with Luke Skywalker.

== Cast and characters ==
=== Starring ===
- Temuera Morrison as Boba Fett:
  The newest "Daimyo" of Tatooine, a former bounty hunter, and clone of his father Jango Fett. Morrison said the series was an opportunity to explore the character's past and show what happened to him between the events of Return of the Jedi (1983) and the second season of The Mandalorian (2020). He focused on Fett's "simmering kind of violence" and desire for revenge, as well as his loneliness, that was caused by watching his father die at a young age. This plays into the idea that he finds a new family in a tribe of Tusken Raiders in The Book of Boba Fett. Archive footage of Daniel Logan as a young Fett filmed for Star Wars: Episode II – Attack of the Clones (2002) was used, while Finnegan Garay served as the on-set actor for young Fett. Morrison also voices the clone troopers in Grogu's Order 66 flashback.
- Ming-Na Wen as Fennec Shand: An elite mercenary and assassin in Fett's service
- Pedro Pascal as Din Djarin / The Mandalorian: A Mandalorian bounty hunter whom Fett and Shand previously assisted in his quest

=== Recurring co-stars ===
- Matt Berry as the voice of 8D8: A torture droid in Fett's service
- David Pasquesi as the Twi'lek majordomo to Mok Shaiz, Mayor of Mos Espa on Tatooine
- Jennifer Beals as Garsa Fwip: A Twi'lek who runs a cantina in Mos Espa called the Sanctuary
- Carey Jones as Krrsantan: A Wookiee bounty hunter and former gladiator who worked for the Twins, Jabba the Hutt's cousins, before being hired by Fett
- Sophie Thatcher as Drash: Leader of a group of cyborgs who work for Fett
- Jordan Bolger as Skad: A member of the group of cyborgs who work for Fett

=== Other co-stars ===
- Stephen Root as Lortha Peel: A water-monger in the Worker's District of Mos Espa
- Danny Trejo as the trainer of Fett's rancor
- Stephen "Thundercat" Bruner as a mod artist in Mos Eisley who saves the lives of Shand and Vanth using cybernetic parts
- Emily Swallow as the Armorer: Leader of Djarin's former Mandalorian warrior tribe
- Amy Sedaris as Peli Motto: A mechanic who runs a hangar in Mos Eisley
- Timothy Olyphant as Cobb Vanth: The marshal of the Tatooine town of Freetown, formerly Mos Pelgo, who previously wore Fett's armor
- Rosario Dawson as Ahsoka Tano: A Togruta and former Jedi Padawan of Anakin Skywalker
- Corey Burton as the voice of Cad Bane: A notorious Duros bounty hunter employed by the Pyke Syndicate. Bane is physically portrayed by Dorian Kingi.
- Mark Hamill as Luke Skywalker:
  A Jedi Master and the son of Anakin Skywalker and Padmé Amidala. As with his de-aged appearance on The Mandalorian, Skywalker was largely created through visual effects and synthesized speech respectively based on reference images and recordings of Hamill. Graham Hamilton was the on-set performer for the character.

Additionally, director Robert Rodriguez voices the Trandoshan crime boss Dokk Strassi (physically portrayed by Stephen Oyoung), and the Ithorian Mayor of Mos Espa, Mok Shaiz. Frank Trigg and Collin Hymes portray the two Gamorrean guards in Fett's service. Mandy Kowalski and Skyler Bible appear as Camie Marstrap and Laze "Fixer" Loneozner, respectively, characters originally portrayed by Koo Stark and Anthony Forrest in a deleted scene from Star Wars (1977). Paul Sun-Hyung Lee and Jon Favreau both reprise their Mandalorian roles as Captain Carson Teva and the voice of Paz Vizsla, respectively, with Vizsla portrayed on-set by Tait Fletcher. Max Lloyd-Jones, who served as the Luke Skywalker stand-in on The Mandalorian, appears as Lieutenant Reed. W. Earl Brown reprises his role as Taanti, the Weequay proprietor in Freetown. Also returning from The Mandalorian is the character Grogu, a young Force-sensitive member of Yoda's species who was previously Djarin's ward. Skywalker's droid R2-D2 also appears.

Sam Witwer, the voice actor for Darth Maul in previous Star Wars media, provided the uncredited voice of a Rodian prisoner, while frequent Star Wars voice actor Stephen Stanton provided the uncredited voice of a Pyke traveler who was performed on-set by Alfred Hsing. Phil LaMarr provided the voice for the Pyke and Klatooinian bosses, and Will Kirby makes a cameo appearance as Karales, a former bounty hunter at the Sanctuary.

== Episodes ==
No.	Title	Directed by	Written by	Original release date
1	"Chapter 1: Stranger in a Strange Land"	Robert Rodriguez	Jon Favreau	December 29, 2021
Boba Fett barely escapes from the sarlacc that swallowed him (Note: As depicted in Return of the Jedi (1983)) and is left for dead by Jawas who steal his armor. He is captured by Tusken Raiders and fails to escape their camp. Five years later, Fett and Fennec Shand have taken control of Jabba's criminal empire on Tatooine. (Note: As depicted in The Mandalorian episode "Chapter 16: The Rescue" (2020).) They receive tribute from local dignitaries and gain the services of two Gamorrean guards. Fett and Shand visit the Sanctuary, a cantina in Mos Espa run by Garsa Fwip, who also offers tribute. Outside the cantina, the group are ambushed by assassins whom they fight off. Shand captures one of the assailants after pursuing them across the rooftops. The guards take an injured Fett to the palace and place him in a bacta tank for healing. Fett remembers his time with the Tuskens: he and a Rodian prisoner were forced to dig for black melons in the desert until they were attacked by a large sand creature that killed the Rodian. Fett killed the creature, saving a Tusken child and earning the respect of the tribe.
2	"Chapter 2: The Tribes of Tatooine"	Steph Green	Jon Favreau	January 5, 2022
Fett and Shand interrogate the captured Night Wind assassin, who claims to have been hired by Mok Shaiz, the Mayor of Mos Espa. Shaiz denies this but offers payment to Fett for capturing the assassin and suggests that they visit the Sanctuary again. Fwip informs Fett that two of Jabba's cousins, a pair of Hutts known as "The Twins," want to claim Jabba's throne for themselves. The Twins arrive with the Wookiee bounty hunter Krrsantan and try to intimidate Fett, but he refuses to submit. In the bacta tank, Fett remembers the Tuskens teaching him their style of combat and desert survival skills. After the tribe was attacked by a Pyke Syndicate spice train, Fett stole speeder bikes from a nearby Nikto gang and taught the Tuskens how to ride them. He led the tribe in a successful attack to stop the train and warned the surviving Pykes that they would have to pay a toll to enter Tuskens territory in the future. To be admitted into the Tusken tribe, Fett was guided by a lizard inside his head to a branch, which he turned into his own gaffi stick. A ceremony was held to accept Fett into the tribe.
3	"Chapter 3: The Streets of Mos Espa"	Robert Rodriguez	Jon Favreau	January 12, 2022
Fett is asked by water-monger Lortha Peel to punish a gang of cyborgs who are stealing his water in Mos Espa, claiming that the citizens of Tatooine do not respect Fett yet. Upon seeing that the gang has no work, Fett employs the cyborgs as enforcers and demands that Peel reduce his prices. In his bacta tank, Fett recalls seeking the toll from the Pykes on behalf of the Tusken tribe, only to find the tribe destroyed by the Nikto gang on his return. His memories are interrupted when Fett is attacked by Krrsantan. Fett, Shand, the guards, and the cyborgs fight off and capture the Wookiee. The Twins soon apologize for sending Krrsantan, claiming that Shaiz has promised Jabba's territory to another syndicate. The Twins vow to leave Tatooine and gift a rancor to Fett. After releasing Krrsantan and resolving to train the rancor, Fett goes to Mos Espa with Shand and the cyborgs to question Shaiz. They find the mayor absent but chase down his majordomo who reveals that Shaiz is working with the Pykes. Later, the Pykes begin arriving in Mos Espa and Fett decides to prepare for war.
4	"Chapter 4: The Gathering Storm"	Kevin Tancharoen	Jon Favreau	January 19, 2022
In the bacta tank, Fett remembers trying to reclaim his Firespray-class gunship from Jabba's Palace, which was heavily guarded. When he discovered Shand dying from a gut wound, (Note: As depicted in The Mandalorian episode "Chapter 5: The Gunslinger" (2019).) Fett took her to a Mos Eisley mod parlor, where her life was saved with cybernetics. In return, Fett requested Shand's help to break into the palace, now ruled by Bib Fortuna. After fighting the guards and retrieving Fett's ship, Shand decided to stay with Fett. They killed the biker gang that Fett believed to have massacred his Tusken tribe, before flying to the sarlacc pit to retrieve his armor. Shand killed the attacking sarlacc with a seismic charge, though Fett did not find his armor inside. In the present, Fett emerges from the bacta tank fully healed. He witnesses Krrsantan fighting Trandoshans in the Sanctuary and hires him. At a banquet, he urges Mos Espa's other crime bosses to unite against the Pyke Syndicate, but they refuse. With the rancor's presence, Fett convinces them to remain neutral while he fights the Syndicate alone. Shand suggests that they hire reinforcements for the imminent war.
5	"Chapter 5: Return of the Mandalorian"	Bryce Dallas Howard	Jon Favreau	January 26, 2022
After Din Djarin tracks and kills a bounty, he delivers the bounty's head for directions to a Mandalorian hideout. There, he finds the Armorer and Paz Vizsla, survivors of their tribe of Mandalorian warriors, who inspect the Darksaber that he won from Moff Gideon. The Armorer explains that whoever wins the Darksaber in combat can become the ruler of Mandalore, though their civilization was destroyed by the Empire. The Armorer turns Djarin's beskar spear into a gift for his former charge, Grogu. Vizsla, a descendant of the Darksaber's creator, Tarre Vizsla, challenges Djarin to a duel for the saber. Djarin defeats Vizsla but reveals that he previously broke their tribe's code by removing his helmet. Rejected by the tribe, Djarin takes a commercial transport to meet Peli Motto on Tatooine, who has an old N-1 starfighter to replace his previous ship, the Razor Crest. (Note: The Razor Crest was destroyed in The Mandalorian episode "Chapter 14: The Tragedy" (2020).) Working together they fix and modify the starship and Djarin takes it for a test flight. Upon his return, Fennec Shand arrives and asks Djarin to assist Boba Fett in the upcoming war. He agrees, but only after he visits a friend.
6	"Chapter 6: From the Desert Comes a Stranger"	Dave Filoni	Jon Favreau and Dave Filoni	February 2, 2022
Cobb Vanth, marshal of Tatooine's Freetown (formerly Mos Pelgo), confronts and shoots Pyke spice runners. Djarin flies to a forested world to visit Grogu, where he is greeted by R2-D2 and Ahsoka Tano. Tano convinces Djarin that his presence will hinder Grogu, so he returns to Tatooine after asking Tano to deliver the gift—a beskar chain mail tunic—to the youngling. Jedi Master Luke Skywalker has begun training Grogu, his first student, to use the Force. Skywalker helps the youngling remember his home, the Jedi Temple on Coruscant, where he saw many Jedi killed during Order 66. Fett and his allies discuss their manpower shortage, and Djarin travels to Freetown to enlist Vanth and his people. After Djarin leaves, hired gun Cad Bane arrives on behalf of the Pykes to order the town to be neutral in the upcoming war. Following a standoff, Bane shoots both the marshal and his deputy. Two Pykes later bomb the Sanctuary in Mos Espa. Skywalker, bearing Djarin's gift, gives a choice to Grogu: take the chain mail and stop his training, or take Yoda's lightsaber and be trained as a Jedi.
7	"Chapter 7: In the Name of Honor"	Robert Rodriguez	Jon Favreau	February 9, 2022
R2-D2 flies Grogu, who has chosen Djarin's chain mail, to Motto's hangar. Bane and the Pykes confront Fett, Shand, and Djarin outside the remains of the Sanctuary, where Bane reveals that the Pykes killed Fett's Tusken tribe and framed the biker gang. The other crime families betray Fett and attack his soldiers throughout Mos Espa. Fett and Djarin send Shaiz's majordomo to distract the Pykes, allowing the pair to attack the group though they are soon outnumbered. Freetown's citizens and the cyborgs arrive to save the pair, but the group are overwhelmed again by two shielded Scorpenek droids. Motto arrives with Grogu, who helps Djarin destroy one of the Scorpeneks while Fett's rancor destroys the other. Bane scares off the rancor and defeats Fett in a gun duel, but Fett kills Bane with his gaffi stick. Grogu lulls the rancor to sleep, ending its rampage. In Mos Eisley, Shand kills the Pyke boss, Shaiz, and the other crime lords. As Fett earns Mos Espa's denizens respect and admiration, Djarin and Grogu fly away in their N-1 starfighter. In a mid-credits scene, Vanth heals in Fett's bacta tank with the mod artist standing nearby.

== Production ==
=== Background ===
In February 2013, Disney CEO Bob Iger announced the development of several Star Wars standalone spin-off films. One was reportedly centered on the bounty hunter character Boba Fett, and would either take place between Star Wars (1977) and The Empire Strikes Back (1980) or The Empire Strikes Back and Return of the Jedi (1983). The film was also said to explore the other bounty hunters seen in The Empire Strikes Back.

Simon Kinberg approached director Josh Trank about making a Star Wars film in early 2014, and Trank made a pitch for a Boba Fett film to Star Wars producer Lucasfilm; he was hired to direct that June. Trank was scheduled to announce the film at Star Wars Celebration Anaheim in April 2015, and also reveal a teaser for the project, but this was canceled at the last minute after Lucasfilm became aware of the troubled production on Trank's film Fantastic Four (2015). By May 2015, Trank was no longer working on the film. A Boba Fett film was still being considered by Lucasfilm as of August 2017, and James Mangold was set to write and direct it in May 2018, with Kinberg co-writing and producing. Mangold described his take as being "a borderline R-rated, single planet spaghetti Western", and he listened to the music of Ennio Morricone while working on the script. Following the financial failure of the film Solo: A Star Wars Story (2018), Disney reconsidered their Star Wars film output. By October 2018, the Boba Fett film was no longer moving forward, and Lucasfilm was prioritizing the Disney+ streaming series The Mandalorian instead. Mangold later acknowledged the impact of Solo's financial failure, but was also unsure the film would have moved forward considering his script's dark tone.

Iger said in February 2020 that spin-offs of The Mandalorian were being considered, and there was potential to add more characters to the series with the intention of then giving them their own series. In May, Temuera Morrison was set to appear as Boba Fett in the second season of The Mandalorian. Morrison portrayed Boba's father Jango Fett in Star Wars: Episode II – Attack of the Clones (2002) and went on to provide the voice of Boba in various Star Wars media. Before Morrison's involvement in The Mandalorian was confirmed, Fett briefly appeared in the first season episode "Chapter 5: The Gunslinger" alongside the character Fennec Shand, portrayed by Ming-Na Wen. Morrison has a brief role in the second-season premiere, "Chapter 9: The Marshal", before being fully introduced in "Chapter 14: The Tragedy", directed by Robert Rodriguez.

=== Development ===
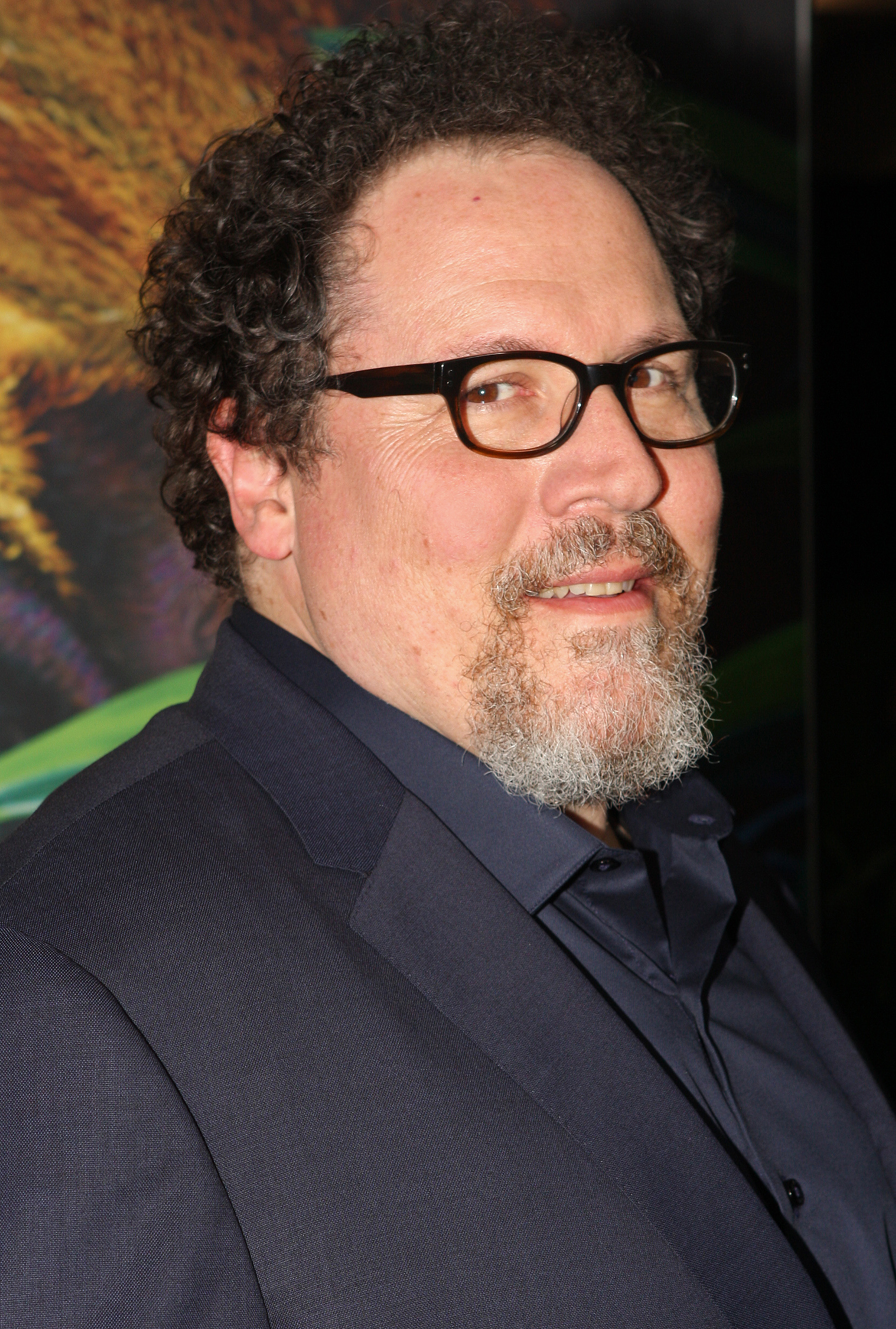
Jon Favreau, the creator and writer of The Book of Boba Fett

By November 2020, production on either the third season of The Mandalorian or a potential spin-off series focusing on Boba Fett was believed to be scheduled to begin later that month or in early December. A Boba Fett spin-off series was not announced by Lucasfilm president Kathleen Kennedy at Disney's Investor Day event on December 10, when The Mandalorian spin-offs Rangers of the New Republic and Ahsoka were announced; Kennedy said those series exist within The Mandalorian's timeline and were planned to culminate in a "climactic story event". Kennedy did announce that the "next chapter" of The Mandalorian story would premiere in December 2021.

The Mandalorian's second-season finale, "Chapter 16: The Rescue", was released later in December 2020. It includes a "surprise end-credit sequence" that revealed The Book of Boba Fett was coming in December 2021. This led to some confusion and speculation among commentators who believed this was a subtitle for the third season of The Mandalorian, and that The Mandalorian would be switching focus from its title character Din Djarin to Boba Fett with the third season. Jon Favreau, The Mandalorian's creator and showrunner, soon clarified that The Book of Boba Fett was its own series separate from the third season of The Mandalorian. He explained that the spin-off was not announced by Kennedy at the Investor Day event because they did not want to "spoil the surprise" of the reveal at the end of "Chapter 16: The Rescue". He added that production had already begun on the spin-off. It is executive produced by Favreau, Dave Filoni, and Rodriguez, with Favreau writing all seven episodes of the series and co-writing the sixth with Filoni. Like the other spin-offs, The Book of Boba Fett is also set within the timeline of The Mandalorian, and has been described as "The Mandalorian season 2.5". The production referred to each episode of The Book of Boba Fett as if it was a third season of The Mandalorian; for example, the first episode was referred to as "301" rather than the typical "101" for a series' first episode. The series consists of seven episodes.

=== Casting ===
When production on the series was first reported, Sophie Thatcher was said to be joining the Mandalorian franchise but it was unknown in which series she would appear. With the series' official announcement in December 2020, Temuera Morrison and Ming-Na Wen were confirmed to be reprising their respective roles of Boba Fett and Fennec Shand from The Mandalorian and other previous Star Wars media. Before then, Wen assumed that she was hired as a series regular for the third season of The Mandalorian. Jennifer Beals was revealed to have a role in the series in November 2021, and Thatcher was confirmed to be appearing in this series in January 2022. The character Krrsantan, a Wookiee bounty hunter introduced in Marvel Comics' Star Wars comic books, also appears in the series, portrayed by Carey Jones, while Corey Burton reprises his role as the voice of Cad Bane from the animated series The Clone Wars and The Bad Batch for the character's live-action debut.

Additional characters from The Mandalorian appear, including Pedro Pascal as Din Djarin / The Mandalorian, Emily Swallow as the Armorer, Amy Sedaris as Peli Motto, Favreau as the voice of Paz Vizsla, Paul Sun-Hyung Lee as Carson Teva, Timothy Olyphant as Cobb Vanth, Grogu, Rosario Dawson as Ahsoka Tano, Mark Hamill as Luke Skywalker, and W. Earl Brown as the Weequay bartender.

=== Filming ===
Filming for the series began by late November 2020, under the working title Buccaneer, on the StageCraft video wall volume in Los Angeles that is also used for The Mandalorian. COVID-19 safety guidelines were followed on set, with crew members wearing masks and face shields around actors, rapid testing for COVID-19 every three days, and normal testing for the virus once a week. After two weeks of filming, members of the cast and crew learned that they were making The Book of Boba Fett rather than The Mandalorian season three. Rodriguez directed three episodes of the series, with Steph Green, Kevin Tancharoen, Bryce Dallas Howard, and Filoni also directing an episode each. Dean Cundey, David Klein, and Paul Hughen served as cinematographers on the series. Filming wrapped by June 8, 2021, with the Obi-Wan Kenobi series taking over the Los Angeles soundstages.

=== Visual effects ===
Industrial Light & Magic, Ghost VFX, Important Looking Pirates, Hybride, and SSVFX provide visual effects for the series.

Lucasfilm hired YouTuber and deepfake expert Shamook as a senior facial capture artist after his viral enhancements of young Luke Skywalker in The Mandalorian surpassed the original's quality. Shamook helped significantly improve Luke's appearance in The Book of Boba Fett.

=== Music ===
By late September 2021, scoring sessions for the series had begun with The Mandalorian composer Ludwig Göransson returning for The Book of Boba Fett. Joseph Shirley, who provided additional music on The Mandalorian, was also involved and was expected to receive composer credit. Göransson is credited as having composed the main themes for the series, with Shirley credited as composer. Walt Disney Records released Göransson's main theme for the series as a digital single on December 28, 2021, and Swedish media commented on the similarity between the theme and Björn Isfält's music for the film Ronia, the Robber's Daughter (1984). Shirley's score was released in two volumes: music from "Chapter 1" through "Chapter 4" was released on January 21, 2022, and a second soundtrack for "Chapter 5" through "Chapter 7" was released on February 11.

All music is composed by Joseph Shirley, except where noted.

The Book of Boba Fett: Vol. 1 (Chapters 1–4) [Original Soundtrack]
No.	Title	Artist	Length
1.	"Rebirth"		3:16
2.	"The Stranger"		3:01
3.	"Normal Day at the Office"		2:41
4.	"Fear Is a Sure Bet"		3:48
5.	"Desert Walk"		3:00
6.	"Boba's Throne"		3:45
7.	"The Twins"		4:37
8.	"Stop That Train"		4:06
9.	"Like a Bantha"		2:02
10.	"The Ultimate Boon"		5:07
11.	"Aliit Ori'shya Tal'din"		6:12
12.	"Road Rage"		4:56
13.	"The Mod Parlour"		3:04
14.	"Fennec and Boba"		2:08
15.	"You Fly, I'll Shoot"		5:34
16.	"The Families of Mos Espa"		5:33
17.	"The Book of Boba Fett"	Ludwig Göransson	2:55
Total length:			65:00

The Book of Boba Fett: Vol. 2 (Chapters 5–7) [Original Soundtrack]
No.	Title	Length
1.	"The Underworld"	3:19
2.	"A Cautionary Tale"	3:12
3.	"Faster Than a Fathier"	4:58
4.	"Maiden Voyage"	1:20
5.	"It's a Family Affair"	3:47
6.	"Life Lessons"	3:56
7.	"A Gift"	2:46
8.	"Teacher's Pet"	6:25
9.	"From the Desert Comes a Stranger"	2:19
10.	"Two Paths Diverged"	2:50
11.	"In the Name of Honor"	3:24
12.	"Battle for Mos Espa"	2:30
13.	"A Town Besieged"	6:46
14.	"Final Showdown"	4:13
15.	"Goodnight"	2:32
16.	"A Town at Peace"	2:21
17.	"The Reign of Boba Fett"	1:21
18.	"Hit It Max" ("The Book of Boba Fett: Vol. 1 (Chapters 1–4)" Bonus Track)	2:01
19.	"Train Heist" ("The Book of Boba Fett: Vol. 1 (Chapters 1–4)" Bonus Track)	6:15
20.	"The Bonfire" ("The Book of Boba Fett: Vol. 1 (Chapters 1–4)" Bonus Track)	1:41
Total length:		68:00

== Release ==
The series premiered on Disney+ on December 29, 2021, and consists of seven episodes that were released weekly until February 9, 2022.

== Reception ==
=== Viewership ===
Whip Media, which tracks global viewing habits from over 1 million daily users of its TV Time app, reported that The Book of Boba Fett was the most anticipated new television series of December 2021. Variety's Trending TV chart, which tracks social media engagement on trending television content, announced that The Book of Boba Fett generated considerable buzz from January 10–16, 2022, landing just under the Top 5 shows, with roughly 2,000 fewer engagements. The series later generated significant buzz from January 24–30, 2022, landing in third place with just under 226,000 engagements. According to market research company Parrot Analytics, which looks at consumer engagement in consumer research, streaming, downloads, and on social media, The Book of Boba Fett led in demand with 39.5 times the average series demand in the United States from January 1–7, 2022. For the week ending February 6, 2022, it maintained its position as the most in-demand new series for the fourth consecutive week. As the series neared its finale on February 9, demand rose by approximately 3% from the previous week. The show secured the No. 2 position on the digital originals chart, boasting 43.3 times the average series demand, following a modest 2.9% drop in demand expressions. It also ranked No. 7 among all TV shows.

Analytics company Samba TV, which gathers viewership data from certain smart TVs and content providers, reported that 1.7 million U.S. households watched the debut episode of the show within the first five days of its release on December 29, 2021. Nielsen Media Research, which records streaming viewership on U.S. television screens, estimated that The Book of Boba Fett garnered 1.9 billion hours of viewership during its first four weeks and saw its weekly viewership totals increase throughout this period. The series was watched for 389 million minutes from December 27 to January 2, 2022. Viewership increased to 563 million minutes from January 3–9, 2022. It later surged to 885 million minutes during the week of February 7, 2022. The season finale achieved the highest viewership for a Star Wars series on Disney+, with 1.5 million viewers, marking a 36% increase over the season 2 finale of The Mandalorian. Whip Media reported The Book of Boba Fett as the most-watched original series across all U.S. platforms for the weeks of January 16 and February 6, 2022. The streaming aggregator JustWatch, a guide to streaming content with access to data from more than 20 million users around the world, calculated that the show was the 4th most streamed television series across all platforms in the United States, during the week ending February 13, 2022. Luminate, which measures streaming performance in the U.S. by analyzing viewership data, audience engagement metrics, and content reach across various platforms, reported that The Book of Boba Fett was Disney+'s most-streamed show in 2022, with 8.5 billion minutes viewed in the United States.

=== Critical response ===
The Book of Boba Fett: Critical reception by episode
The Book of Boba Fett (2021–22): Percentage of positive critics' reviews tracked by the website Rotten Tomatoes

Review aggregator Rotten Tomatoes reported an approval rating of 66% based on 198 reviews, with an average rating of 6.8/10, with the critical consensus stating: "The Book of Boba Fett could never match the adventures that existed in fans' imaginations for decades, but it earns its commission with spectacular set pieces and Temuera Morrison's commanding presence." Metacritic gave the series a weighted average score of 59 out of 100 based on 19 critics, indicating "mixed or average reviews".

Daniel D'Addario of Variety praised the narrative, visuals, and performances. Polygon's David Grossman said that the first episode showed the "desperate side of Star Wars". Maggie Lovitt at Collider expressed that the second episode "delivered one of the best and most thematically rich episodes of Star Wars television to date". Hannah Flint of IGN stated that without Morrison portraying Fett the show might have been a total failure, saying, "Morrison's plain-speaking, humane antihero keeps you endeared to Boba's story". NME's Jesse Hassenger said the show was really "season 2.5 of The Mandalorian" and that it "had a baffling structure, with poorly integrated flashbacks that halted abruptly halfway through the season and an equally sudden swerve away from Boba Fett himself shortly thereafter." Nick Wanserski of The A.V. Club said that the show was "very watchable", but that it ended the same way it started: "a mess". The Ringer staff opined that excluding Fett from the series' penultimate two episodes negatively impacted the finale, with general praise for the tie-in to The Mandalorian (including Grogu's appearance) and Cad Bane's live-action debut (excluding his death); some opined that Fett is better in a supporting role.

Wanserski also said that the train heist scene was "rad", while Rohan Nahaar of The Indian Express criticized it. Flint stated that the decision to kill off the Tuskens was an "obvious and lazy one". The cyborg gang was negatively compared to the Power Rangers. The digitally de-aged Luke was considered an improvement from his appearance on The Mandalorian, but some considered the special effect off-putting. Lex Pryor from The Ringer, considered that the show failed to deliver its potential and the series "will never actually have to focus on anything other than the lives of a select few characters and their closest relatives."

=== Accolades ===
Year	Award	Category	Recipient(s)	Result	Ref.
2022	Cinema Audio Society Awards	Outstanding Achievement in Sound Mixing for Television Series – Half Hour	Shawn Holden, Bonnie Wild, Scott R. Lewis, Alan Meyerson, and Richard Duarte	Nominated	
2022	Costume Designers Guild Awards	Excellence in Sci-Fi/Fantasy Television	Shawna Trpcic, Areayl Cooper, Elissa Alcala, Michael Uwandi, Phillip Boutte, Keith Christensen, Imario Susilo, and Julie-Marie Robar	Won	
2022	Golden Reel Awards	Outstanding Achievement in Sound Editing – Limited Series or Anthology	Matthew Wood, Bonnie Wild, David Acord, David W. Collins, Benjamin A. Burtt, Jonathan Borland, Angela Ang, Ryan Cota, Alyssa Nevarez, Ronni Brown, Andrea Gard, Sean England, Margie O'Malley, and Stephanie McNally	Nominated	
2022	Irish Film and Television Awards	Best Visual Effects	Ed Bruce and Sam Johnston	Nominated	
2022	Hollywood Critics Association TV Awards	Best Actress in a Streaming Series, Drama	Ming-Na Wen	Nominated	
2022	Primetime Creative Arts Emmy Awards	Outstanding Fantasy/Sci-Fi Costumes	Shawna Trpcic, Julie Robar, and Areayl Cooper (for "Chapter 1: Stranger in a Strange Land")	Nominated	
2022	Primetime Creative Arts Emmy Awards	Outstanding Sound Editing for a Comedy or Drama Series (One-Hour)	Matthew Wood, Bonnie Wild, David Acord, Angela Ang, Ryan Cota, Benjamin A. Burtt, David Collins, Alyssa Nevarez, Stephanie McNally, Margie O'Malley, Andrea Gard, and Sean England (for "Chapter 6: From the Desert Comes a Stranger")	Nominated	
2022	Primetime Creative Arts Emmy Awards	Outstanding Special Visual Effects in a Season or a Movie	Richard Bluff, Abbigail Keller, Paul Kavanagh, Cameron Neilson, Scott R. Fisher, John Rosengrant, Enrico Damm, Robin Hackl, and Landis Fields	Won	
2022	Primetime Creative Arts Emmy Awards	Outstanding Stunt Coordination for a Drama Series, Limited or Anthology Series or Movie	JJ Dashnaw	Nominated	
2022	Saturn Awards	Best Streaming Limited Event Television Series	The Book of Boba Fett	Nominated	
2022	Saturn Awards	Best Actress in a Streaming Series	Ming-Na Wen	Won	
2023	Visual Effects Society Awards	Outstanding Created Environment in an Episode, Commercial, or Real-Time Project	Daniel Schmid Leal, Phi Tran, Hasan Ilhan, Steve Wang (for "Chapter 7: In the Name of Honor": Mos Espa)	Nominated	

== Documentary series ==
In April 2022, a Disney Gallery episode for the series was announced, which was released on May 4, 2022.
