= Bad Egg (disambiguation) =

Bad Egg or Bad Eggs may refer to:

- Bad egg
- Bad Eggs, a 2003 film
- "Bad Eggs" (Buffy the Vampire Slayer), an episode of Buffy the Vampire Slayer
- "Bad Eggs" (Star Wars: Young Jedi Adventures), an episode of Star Wars: Young Jedi Adventures
