= List of Star Wars television series =

The Star Wars franchise has spawned multiple films and television series. Two animated series were released in the mid-1980s. Further animated series began to be released in the 2000s, the first two of which focused on the prequel trilogy-era Clone Wars. After Disney's 2012 acquisition of Lucasfilm, only The Clone Wars was kept in the canon of continuity of the episodic Star Wars films. Further half-hour animated series include Rebels, which ties into the original trilogy, and Resistance, which ties into the sequel trilogy. In the 2020s, two spin-off series from The Clone Wars debuted on Disney+, The Bad Batch and Maul – Shadow Lord. Two animated anthology series have been produced: Visions (2021) and Star Wars Tales, comprising Tales of the Jedi (2022), Tales of the Empire (2024), and Tales of the Underworld (2025), with the former spawning a spin-off, The Ninth Jedi. A children's animated series, Young Jedi Adventures, set during the High Republic era, premiered in May 2023.

The first live-action series in the franchise, The Mandalorian, premiered on Disney+ in November 2019 and spawned two contemporaneous spin-offs, The Book of Boba Fett and Ahsoka (in addition to a 2026 film); Skeleton Crew takes place in the same era. Additional live-action series include Obi-Wan Kenobi and Andor, both set several years before the original trilogy, and The Acolyte, set during the High Republic era.

== Animated series ==
Eleven television series make up the Star Wars animated franchise: Droids, Ewoks, The Clone Wars, Rebels, Resistance, The Bad Batch, Visions, Tales, Young Jedi Adventures, Maul – Shadow Lord, and Visions Presents. All series in total amount to 452 episodes across 28 seasons of television.

Series	Season	Episodes	Originally released			Showrunner(s)	Status
Series	Season	Episodes	First released	Last released	Network	Showrunner(s)	Status
Droids	1	13	September 7, 1985	November 30, 1985	ABC	Miki Herman & Peter Sauder	Concluded
Droids	Special		June 7, 1986		ABC	Miki Herman & Peter Sauder	Concluded
Ewoks	1	13	September 7, 1985	November 30, 1985	ABC	Miki Herman & Peter Sauder	Concluded
Ewoks	2	13	September 13, 1986	December 13, 1986	ABC	Miki Herman & Peter Sauder	Concluded
The Clone Wars	Film		August 15, 2008		Theatrical release	Dave Filoni	Concluded
The Clone Wars	1	22	October 3, 2008	March 20, 2009	Cartoon Network	Dave Filoni	Concluded
The Clone Wars	2	22	October 2, 2009	April 30, 2010	Cartoon Network	Dave Filoni	Concluded
The Clone Wars	3	22	September 17, 2010	April 1, 2011	Cartoon Network	Dave Filoni	Concluded
The Clone Wars	4	22	September 16, 2011	March 16, 2012	Cartoon Network	Dave Filoni	Concluded
The Clone Wars	5	20	September 29, 2012	March 2, 2013	Cartoon Network	Dave Filoni	Concluded
The Clone Wars	6	13	March 7, 2014		Netflix	Dave Filoni	Concluded
The Clone Wars	7	12	February 21, 2020	May 4, 2020	Disney+	Dave Filoni	Concluded
Rebels	Shorts	4	August 11, 2014	September 1, 2014	Disney XD	Dave Filoni	Concluded
Rebels	1	15	October 3, 2014	March 2, 2015	Disney XD	Dave Filoni	Concluded
Rebels	2	22	June 20, 2015	March 30, 2016	Disney XD	Dave Filoni	Concluded
Rebels	3	22	September 24, 2016	March 25, 2017	Disney XD	Justin Ridge	Concluded
Rebels	4	16	October 16, 2017	March 5, 2018	Disney XD	Dave Filoni	Concluded
Resistance	1	21	October 7, 2018	March 17, 2019	Disney XD; Disney Channel	Justin Ridge	Concluded
Resistance	Shorts	12	December 10, 2018	December 31, 2018	Disney XD; Disney Channel	Justin Ridge	Concluded
Resistance	2	19	October 6, 2019	January 26, 2020	Disney XD; Disney Channel	Justin Ridge	Concluded
The Bad Batch	1	16	May 4, 2021	August 13, 2021	Disney+	Jennifer Corbett	Concluded
The Bad Batch	2	16	January 4, 2023	March 29, 2023	Disney+	Jennifer Corbett	Concluded
The Bad Batch	3	15	February 21, 2024	May 1, 2024	Disney+	Jennifer Corbett	Concluded
Visions	1	9	September 22, 2021		Disney+	N/A	Concluded
Visions	2	9	May 4, 2023		Disney+	N/A	Concluded
Visions	3	9	October 29, 2025		Disney+	N/A	Concluded
Tales	Jedi	6	October 26, 2022		Disney+	Dave Filoni	Concluded
Tales	Empire	6	May 4, 2024		Disney+	Dave Filoni	Concluded
Tales	Underworld	6	May 4, 2025		Disney+	Dave Filoni	Concluded
Young Jedi Adventures	Shorts	6	April 26, 2023 (Note: These shorts were released earlier on YouTube, and then released together on Disney+.)		Disney+ Disney Jr.	Michael Olson	Concluded
Young Jedi Adventures	1	25	May 4, 2023	February 14, 2024	Disney+ Disney Jr.	Michael Olson	Concluded
Young Jedi Adventures	Shorts	6	August 2, 2024		Disney+ Disney Jr.	Michael Olson	Concluded
Young Jedi Adventures	2	23	August 14, 2024	March 19, 2025	Disney+ Disney Jr.	Michael Olson	Concluded
Young Jedi Adventures	3	7	December 8, 2025		Disney+ Disney Jr.	Michael Olson	Concluded
Maul – Shadow Lord	1	10	April 6, 2026	May 4, 2026	Disney+	Matt Michnovetz	Released
Maul – Shadow Lord	2	TBA	2027	TBA	Disney+	Matt Michnovetz	In production
Visions Presents	The Ninth Jedi	8	August 5, 2026		Disney+ & Hulu	N/A	Released

=== Droids and Ewoks (1985–1986) ===
Nelvana, the animation studio that produced the animated segment of the Holiday Special, was hired to create two animated series which aired together on ABC: Droids (1985–86) follows the adventures of C-3PO and R2-D2, and its sister series Ewoks (1985–86) features Wicket and other members of the titular species from Return of the Jedi, both set before the events of the original trilogy. One reviewer calls Droids "rudimentary" and Ewoks "unremarkable", but writes that both "marked the first major effort to expand the Star Wars 'brand' beyond its original live-action film existence."

=== The Clone Wars (2008–2020) ===
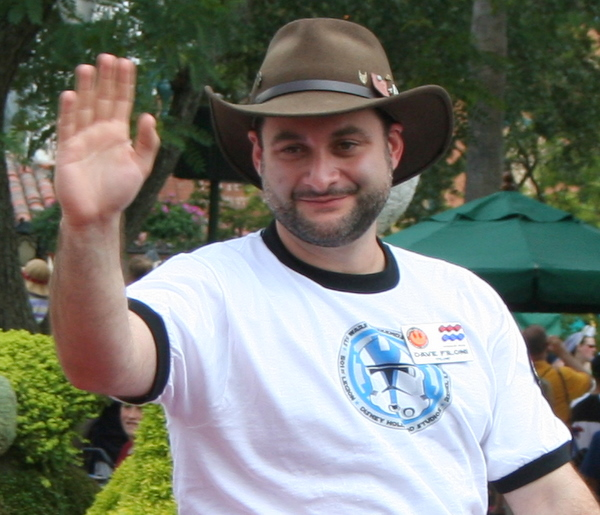
Dave Filoni served as supervising director for both The Clone Wars and seasons 1, 2, and 4 of Rebels, before being promoted to oversee the development of all future Lucasfilm Animation projects in 2016.

George Lucas created his own animation company, Lucasfilm Animation, and used it to produce his first in-house Star Wars animated series, using Cartoon Network's 2003 Clone Wars micro-series as a "pilot". The Clone Wars (2008–2020) was introduced through a 2008 animated film of the same name. The series is set between Attack of the Clones and Revenge of the Sith of the prequel trilogy. It focuses mainly on the Jedi characters of Anakin Skywalker and Obi-Wan Kenobi, as well as Anakin's Padawan apprentice, Ahsoka Tano (an original character created by Filoni for the series), with other characters from the live-action films in supporting roles. The series marked the beginning of Dave Filoni's involvement in Star Wars animation projects.

After Disney's acquisition of the Star Wars franchise, The Clone Wars was cancelled in 2014 before its intended final episodes were completed. The remaining unaired episodes were released on Netflix as "The Lost Missions". The chronological storyline order was released after the series had initially finished airing. The film and series were included in the canon established in 2014. The show was later revived for an additional final season that premiered on February 21, 2020, on the streaming service Disney+.

=== Rebels (2014–2018) ===
In 2014, Disney XD began airing Star Wars Rebels, the first animated series produced following the Disney acquisition. It follows a band of rebels as they fight the Galactic Empire in the years leading up to A New Hope. It closed some of the arcs introduced in The Clone Wars. Due to the film Rogue One being produced at the same time, the film and the series acknowledged each other. The series also included an in-canon version of Grand Admiral Thrawn from the Legends Thrawn trilogy.

=== Resistance (2018–2020) ===
The animated series Star Wars Resistance debuted in late 2018, shifting the animation style towards anime-inspired cel-shading visuals, and focuses on young Resistance pilot Kazuda Xiono before and during The Force Awakens and The Last Jedi, leading up to The Rise of Skywalker. Sequel trilogy characters such as Captain Phasma, General Hux, and Kylo Ren appear. The second and final season premiered on October 6, 2019.

=== The Bad Batch (2021–2024) ===
Set after the events of The Clone Wars, The Bad Batch follows the titular squad making their way through the galaxy as mercenaries in the early days of the Empire. The series was announced in July 2020, and premiered on Disney+ on May 4, 2021. Dave Filoni, Athena Portillo, Brad Rau, and Jennifer Corbett serve as executive producers, with Carrie Beck as co-executive producer and Josh Rimes as producer. Rau also serves as supervising director with Corbett the head writer. The second season debuted on January 4, 2023, and consists of 16 episodes, concluding on March 29, 2023. The third and final season premiered on February 21, 2024, consisting of 15 episodes and concluded on May 1, 2024.

=== Visions (2021–2025) ===
Announced on December 10, 2020, Visions is an anthology anime series of nine short films by different creators, set in the Star Wars universe but not restricted to the canonical timeline. It released on Disney+ on September 22, 2021. Footage from the project was first revealed at Anime Expo on July 3. The anthology featured short films produced by Kamikaze Douga, Geno Studio, Studio Colorido, Studio Trigger, Kinema Citrus, Science Saru, and Production I.G. A second volume of shorts from animation studios based in Japan, Chile, the United Kingdom, France, South Africa, South Korea, India, Ireland, and Spain, as well as Lucasfilm, was released on May 4, 2023. A third season of Visions was announced during Disney's Content Showcase event in November 2024, and was released on October 29, 2025.

=== Tales (2022–2025) ===
In April 2022, an animated anthology series titled Tales of the Jedi was revealed to be in development, with Filoni involved. The series was officially revealed in May 2022 as a six-episode series, with three episodes focusing on Ahsoka Tano throughout her life, and the other three focusing on a young Count Dooku and his padawan Qui-Gon Jinn. It was released on October 26, 2022, on Disney+. A second installment, known as Tales of the Empire, was announced in April 2023, and was released on May 4, 2024, focusing on Morgan Elsbeth and Barriss Offee. A third installment, known as Tales of the Underworld, was released on May 4, 2025, focusing on Cad Bane and Asajj Ventress.

=== Young Jedi Adventures (2023–2025) ===
In May 2022, the Young Jedi Adventures animated series was announced at Star Wars Celebration Anaheim. The series is targeted at young audiences and their families, and is set during the High Republic era, following a group of younglings as they learn the ways of the Force, including compassion, self-discipline, team work and patience, to become Jedi Knights. Three animated shorts introducing the characters of the series premiered on the Disney Jr. YouTube channel on March 27, 2023, with an additional three released at a later point, before all six will be released on Disney+ on April 26. The series premiered on May 4, 2023, on Disney+ and on Disney Jr.

=== Maul – Shadow Lord (2026–present) ===
In April 2025, the Maul – Shadow Lord animated series was announced at Star Wars Celebration Japan. The series will cover the period following the Clone Wars where the former Sith Lord Maul attempts to rebuild his criminal syndicate on a planet unknown to the Empire, while teaching a new apprentice. Sam Witwer will reprise his voice role as Maul from previous Star Wars media. The first season, consisting of 10 episodes, premiered on April 6, 2026, and concluded on May 4.

=== Visions Presents (2026) ===
A new series titled Star Wars: Visions Presents, serving as a spin-off to Star Wars: Visions was announced at Star Wars Celebration on April 19, 2025. The series, subtitled The Ninth Jedi, is a full anime series building on the shorts of the same name. The series was released on August 5, 2026, on Disney+ and Hulu.

=== Micro-series and shorts ===
- Clone Wars (2003–2005): After the release of Attack of the Clones, developed and drawn by Genndy Tartakovsky, Cartoon Network produced and aired the micro-series Clone Wars from 2003 to weeks before the 2005 release of Revenge of the Sith, as the series featured events set between those films. The plot in the series was intended as prequel to the then-upcoming Revenge of the Sith and directly leads to the starting point of the movie. It won the Primetime Emmy Awards for Outstanding Animated Program in 2004 and 2005.
- Blips (2017): An animated micro-series created to promote The Last Jedi. It features droids such as BB-8 and R2-D2, in addition to porgs.
- Forces of Destiny (2017–2018): The animated micro-series debuted in 2017; it focuses on the female characters of the franchise and is set in various eras.
- Galaxy of Adventures (2018–2020): The animated micro-series' debuted on the "Star Wars Kids" YouTube channel and website in late 2018. Using stylized animation, the series of shorts reimagines key scenes from the saga, initially leading up to the release of The Rise of Skywalker. The shorts feature audio from the original films (with narration by Dante Basco) and are animated by Titmouse, Inc. The score is composed by Ryan Shore.
- Roll Out (2019–2020): The animated micro-series debuted on the Star Wars Kids YouTube channel and website in August 2019. The shorts depict the main characters from the franchise as ball-shaped, similar to BB-8, and utilize a kid-friendly cutout animation style.
- Galaxy of Creatures (2021–2023): The animated micro-series debuted on the Star Wars Kids YouTube channel and website in October 2021. The shorts depict the droid SF-R3 ("Aree") as he journeys across the galaxy learning about various wildlife.
- Galactic Pals (2022): An animated micro-series that premiered on April 12, 2022, on StarWarsKids.com and YouTube. A spinoff of the adventures of the droid SF-R3 ("Aree") in Star Wars Galaxy of Creatures, Galactic Pals joins M1-RE ("Miree"), another member of the Galactic Society of Creature Enthusiasts, as she looks after and studies ornery Ortolans, fussy Hutts, scavenging Jawas, and more creatures and aliens aboard the Youngling Care Space Station.
- "Zen – Grogu and Dust Bunnies" (2022): A hand-drawn animated short by Studio Ghibli that featured Grogu and the "dust bunnies" from My Neighbor Totoro. It was released on Disney+ on November 12, 2022.
- Fun with Nubs (2024–2025): A series of shorts that ties in with Young Jedi Adventures.
- Grogu Cutest in the Galaxy (2024–2025): A series of silent short animations centered on Grogu posted on Instagram Reels.
- Droid Diaries (2025): A series that follows BB-8 and R2-D2 on quirky adventures throughout the galaxy.
- Icons of the Force (2025–2026): A series of shorts that revisits all of the most iconic characters of Star Wars universe.
- Minis (2025–2026): A series that recreates moments from Star Wars films and television series in animation format.
- Under the Hood with Hibi (2026): Promotional animation web series created to promote the upcoming video game Star Wars: Galactic Racer.

== Live-action series ==
All of the released and announced live-action series are being released on Disney+. Seven television series make up the Star Wars live-action franchise: The Mandalorian, The Book of Boba Fett, Obi-Wan Kenobi, Andor, Ahsoka, The Acolyte, and Skeleton Crew. All series in total amount to 85 episodes across 10 seasons of television.

Series	Season	Episodes	Originally released		Showrunner(s)	Status
Series	Season	Episodes	First released	Last released	Showrunner(s)	Status
The Mandalorian	1	8	November 12, 2019	December 27, 2019	Jon Favreau	Concluded
The Mandalorian	2	8	October 30, 2020	December 18, 2020	Jon Favreau	Concluded
The Mandalorian	3	8	March 1, 2023	April 19, 2023	Jon Favreau	Concluded
The Book of Boba Fett	1	7	December 29, 2021	February 9, 2022	Jon Favreau	Concluded
Obi-Wan Kenobi	1	6	May 27, 2022	June 22, 2022	Joby Harold	Concluded
Andor	1	12	September 21, 2022	November 23, 2022	Tony Gilroy	Concluded
Andor	2	12	April 22, 2025	May 13, 2025	Tony Gilroy	Concluded
Ahsoka	1	8	August 22, 2023	October 3, 2023	Dave Filoni	Released
Ahsoka	2	8	January 20, 2027	TBA	Dave Filoni	Post-production
The Acolyte	1	8	June 4, 2024	July 16, 2024	Leslye Headland	Concluded
Skeleton Crew	1	8	December 2, 2024	January 14, 2025	Jon Watts and Christopher Ford	Concluded

=== The Mandalorian (2019–2023) ===
In March 2018, Jon Favreau was hired to write and produce a live-action Star Wars series for Disney+. The series follows "a lone gunfighter in the outer reaches of the galaxy far from the authority of the New Republic" a few years after the events of Return of the Jedi. In August 2018, it was reported that the series would cost about "$100 million for 10 episodes". Pedro Pascal stars as the titular character, and is joined by supporting actors Gina Carano, Nick Nolte, Giancarlo Esposito, Emily Swallow, Carl Weathers, Omid Abtahi, and Werner Herzog. The series premiered on November 12, 2019, with the launch of Disney+. The second season premiered on October 30, 2020, while the third season premiered on March 1, 2023. The series also spawned a 2026 live-action film.

=== The Book of Boba Fett (2021–2022) ===
In November 2020, Deadline Hollywood reported that a miniseries focused on Boba Fett could begin filming before the end of the year, before a third season of The Mandalorian went into production. The series, known as The Book of Boba Fett, was revealed the following month, and confirmed to be in production ahead of The Mandalorian season three. Favreau and Filoni executive produce along with Robert Rodriguez, with Temuera Morrison and Ming-Na Wen reprising their roles as Boba Fett and Fennec Shand, respectively. It premiered on December 29, 2021, and consisted of seven episodes.

=== Obi-Wan Kenobi (2022) ===
In August 2019, it was reported that a series focused on Obi-Wan Kenobi was in development, with Ewan McGregor in talks to reprise his role from the prequel trilogy. The series was initially thought to have been developing as a standalone film, which was ultimately scrapped due to the performance of Solo at the box office. During the 2019 D23 Expo, Lucasfilm officially announced that the series was in development, with McGregor confirmed to reprise his role as the titular character. It will take place ten years after Revenge of the Sith, thus exploring the time during Kenobi's exile prior to the events of A New Hope. In September 2019, Deborah Chow and Hossein Amini were announced as the series' director and writer, respectively, who will also serve as executive producers alongside McGregor. In April 2020, it was announced that Joby Harold would officially be taking over writing duties from Amini. In August 2020, Kathleen Kennedy told TheWrap that it would be a limited series. Filming had begun by May 2021.

On Disney Investor Day 2020, it was revealed that Hayden Christensen would reprise his role as Darth Vader, and that the series would be titled Obi-Wan Kenobi. The series premiered on May 27, 2022, with its first two episodes, and consisted of six episodes, airing the remaining four weekly on Wednesdays until June 22.

=== Andor (2022–2025) ===
The series follows rebel spy Cassian Andor, five years before the events of Rogue One during the formative years of the Rebellion.

In November 2018, a prequel series to the 2016 film Rogue One centered on Andor was confirmed to be in development, described as a "rousing spy thriller" with Diego Luna reprising his role for the series. Stephen Schiff was hired to serve as showrunner and executive producer of the series, which was developed by Jared Bush, who wrote a series bible and a draft of the pilot episode. In April 2019, Alan Tudyk was confirmed to be reprising his role of K-2SO. In April 2020, Tony Gilroy, who worked on the reshoots of Rogue One, replaced Schiff as showrunner. Gilroy was going to write and direct the pilot, and direct other episodes as well. It was also revealed in April 2020 that Stellan Skarsgård, Kyle Soller, and Denise Gough had joined the cast in undisclosed roles, along with Genevieve O'Reilly reprising her role of Mon Mothma. In September 2020, it was announced that Gilroy would step down from his directing duties in light of the COVID-19 pandemic and would be replaced by Toby Haynes, who was set to direct the first three episodes. Filming began in late November 2020 in London. Andor premiered on September 21, 2022, and the first season consisted of 12 episodes. The second and final season premiered on April 22, 2025 and concluded on May 13, 2025.

=== Ahsoka (2023–present) ===
In December 2020, Ahsoka was announced. Developed by Favreau and Filoni, with Filoni serving as its writer and showrunner, it exists alongside The Mandalorian and The Book of Boba Fett through a crossover event, while also continuing the storyline of Rebels. Rosario Dawson headlines the limited series, reprising her role as Ahsoka Tano. Natasha Liu Bordizzo, Mary Elizabeth Winstead, and Eman Esfandi have been cast as Sabine Wren, Hera Syndulla, and Ezra Bridger, characters first introduced in Rebels. Hayden Christensen, Genevieve O'Reilly, Lars Mikkelsen, Diana Lee Inosanto, and David Tennant reprise their roles as Anakin Skywalker, Mon Mothma, Grand Admiral Thrawn, Morgan Elsbeth, and Huyang from previous media. Ray Stevenson and Ivanna Sakhno are cast as new characters Baylan Skoll and Shin Hati. Filming began in May 2022. Ahsoka premiered on August 22, 2023. The first season consisted of eight episodes released until October 3, 2023. In January 2024, it was announced that a second season was in development with Filoni, which is expected to premiere on January 20, 2027.

=== The Acolyte (2024) ===
In April 2020, Variety reported that a female-centric live-action Star Wars series is in development for Disney+ with Russian Doll co-creator Leslye Headland serving as a writer and showrunner. In early November, Headland expounded that the series would be set "in a pocket of the universe and a pocket of the timeline that we don't know much about," elaborating that she was more engaged creatively with the geography of the Star Wars universe than its existing visuals. On November 5, Deadline reported that the series was expected to be an "action thriller with martial arts elements". On Disney Investor Day 2020, it was revealed that the series would be titled The Acolyte and take place during the late High Republic era. In mid-2021, it was reported that the series would consist of eight episodes. In May 2022, Headland said the series would be a "mystery thriller" set about 100 years before The Phantom Menace, that writing was almost complete, and that the series was casting; In 2022, Amandla Stenberg, Lee Jung-jae, and Manny Jacinto were confirmed to be playing major roles. The eight-episode series premiered on Disney+ on June 4, 2024. The series was canceled in August 2024.

=== Skeleton Crew (2024–2025) ===
In February 2022, Production Weekly revealed the existence of an upcoming, untitled Star Wars series that was using the working title Grammar Rodeo. It was later reported that Jon Watts was being considered to direct at least one episode of the series, along with Favreau as an executive producer. Casting was set to include four teenage actors and one 30-to-40-year old actor as its series regulars. Filming was set to begin as early as June 2022 and last until December 2022 at Manhattan Beach Studios, with a formal announcement planned for the series at Star Wars Celebration in May 2022. In mid-May 2022, it was further revealed that the series was being created and written by Christopher Ford, who would also executive produce with Watts. The series would be set after the events of Return of the Jedi (1983) and was being described as a "galactic version of classic Amblin coming-of-age adventure films of the '80s". At Star Wars Celebration it was revealed that the series was titled Skeleton Crew and that it would star Jude Law. Filming had been happening for a "few weeks" by early September 2022. The series premiered on December 2, 2024.

== Game show ==
Series	Season	Episodes	Originally released			Host
Series	Season	Episodes	First released	Last released	Network	Host
Jedi Temple Challenge	1	10	June 10, 2020	August 5, 2020	StarWarsKids.com	Ahmed Best

=== Jedi Temple Challenge (2020) ===
Star Wars: Jedi Temple Challenge is a web-based children's game show developed by Lucasfilm. First announced in December 2019, the series debuted on the Star Wars Kids website and YouTube channel on June 10, 2020. The series features young contestants competing as Jedi Padawans in a series of obstacle courses and knowledge tests in the attempt to gain the rank of Jedi Knight. The show is hosted by Ahmed Best, who plays the character of Kelleran Beq, the Jedi Master mentor of the contestants (and the twin brother of Achk Med-Beq, Best's live-action character from Attack of the Clones) who is joined by his droid companions, AD-3 (voiced by Mary Holland and performed by Gordon Tarpley) and LX-R5. Sam Witwer provides the voice of an unknown character of the dark side of the Force during the final challenge of each episode.

== Documentaries ==
- Disney Gallery (2020–2023):
  - The Mandalorian (2020–2023): A making-of documentary series about The Mandalorian debuted on Disney+ with an eight-episode season on May 4, 2020. A second season was split into two longer episodes, and a single special covered the third season.
  - The Book of Boba Fett (2022): A making-of documentary series about The Book of Boba Fett debuted on Disney+ with a single hour-long episode in May 2022.
  - Obi-Wan Kenobi: A Jedi's Return (2022): A making-of documentary series about Obi-Wan Kenobi was released on Disney+ in September 2022. It consists of a single hour-long episode.
- Vehicle Flythroughs (2021): A Disney+ series of tours through vehicles, with one episode for the Millennium Falcon and one for a First Order Star Destroyer. It was released on May 4, 2021, along with the Biomes short film.
- Biomes (2021): A short depicting various biomes of the Star Wars universe debuted on Disney+ on May 4, 2021, along with the Vehicle Flythroughs shorts.
- Galaxy of Sounds (2021): A Disney+ series of seven short compilations focusing on the sound effects from various Star Wars films, grouped into thematic episodes.

== Other series ==
=== Detours (2026) ===
Star Wars Detours is an unaired animated parody series from the creators of Robot Chicken, which was postponed in 2013 and ultimately unaired. Production began in 2012 prior to the Disney acquisition, with 39 episodes completed and 62 additional scripts finished. In July 2026, Green revealed at San Diego Comic-Con that a curated selection of episodes would be showcased at George Lucas's upcoming Lucas Museum of Narrative Art, which opened on September 22, 2026.

== Reception ==
=== Ratings ===
Viewership and ratings per season of List of Star Wars television series
Series	Season	Episodes	First aired		Last aired	
Series	Season	Episodes	Date	Viewers (millions)	Date	Viewers (millions)
The Clone Wars	1	22	October 3, 2008	3.99	March 20, 2009	3.29
The Clone Wars	2	22	October 2, 2009	2.58	April 30, 2010	2.76
The Clone Wars	3	22	September 17, 2010	2.42	April 1, 2011	2.31
The Clone Wars	4	22	September 16, 2011	1.93	March 16, 2012	2.03
The Clone Wars	5	20	September 29, 2012	1.94	March 2, 2013	2.18
Rebels	1	15	October 3, 2014	2.74	March 2, 2015	0.72
Rebels	2	22	June 20, 2015	0.59	March 30, 2016	0.69
Rebels	3	22	September 24, 2016	0.56	March 25, 2017	0.50
Rebels	4	16	October 16, 2017	–	March 5, 2018	0.46
Resistance	1	21	October 7, 2018	0.33	March 17, 2019	0.36
Young Jedi Adventures	1	25	May 4, 2023	0.133	March 15, 2024	–

=== Critical response ===
Critical response of Star Wars series
Title	Season	Rotten Tomatoes	Metacritic
Animated series
The Clone Wars	1	69% (16 reviews)	64 (9 reviews)
The Clone Wars	3	100% (5 reviews)	—N/a
The Clone Wars	5	100% (5 reviews)	—N/a
The Clone Wars	6	100% (12 reviews)	—N/a
The Clone Wars	7	100% (36 reviews)	—N/a
Rebels	1	92% (13 reviews)	78 (4 reviews)
Rebels	2	100% (6 reviews)	—N/a
Rebels	3	100% (6 reviews)	—N/a
Rebels	4	100% (10 reviews)	—N/a
Resistance	1	93% (14 reviews)	—N/a
The Bad Batch	1	86% (93 reviews)	67 (9 reviews)
The Bad Batch	2	90% (21 reviews)	—N/a
The Bad Batch	3	88% (17 reviews)	68 (4 reviews)
Visions	1	96% (53 reviews)	79 (15 reviews)
Visions	2	100% (23 reviews)	—N/a
Visions	3	100% (20 reviews)	—N/a
Tales	Jedi	100% (22 reviews)	78 (6 reviews)
Tales	Empire	88% (25 reviews)	76 (5 reviews)
Tales	Underworld	100% (13 reviews)	70 (5 reviews)
Maul – Shadow Lord	1	98% (47 reviews)	75 (10 reviews)
Visions Presents	The Ninth Jedi	95% (19 reviews)	83 (7 reviews)
Animated micro-series
Clone Wars	1	80% (5 reviews)	—N/a
Live-action series
The Mandalorian	1	93% (338 reviews)	70 (29 reviews)
The Mandalorian	2	93% (449 reviews)	76 (14 reviews)
The Mandalorian	3	84% (248 reviews)	70 (15 reviews)
The Book of Boba Fett	1	66% (198 reviews)	59 (19 reviews)
Obi-Wan Kenobi	1	82% (356 reviews)	73 (19 reviews)
Andor	1	96% (610 reviews)	74 (31 reviews)
Andor	2	97% (212 reviews)	92 (34 reviews)
Ahsoka	1	85% (272 reviews)	68 (25 reviews)
The Acolyte	1	79% (252 reviews)	67 (33 reviews)
Skeleton Crew	1	92% (151 reviews)	72 (23 reviews)

=== Emmy Awards ===
Year	Series	Category	Recipient(s)	Result	Ref.
2004	Star Wars: Clone Wars	Outstanding Animated Program (More Than One Hour)	Star Wars: Clone Wars	Won	
2005	Star Wars: Clone Wars	Outstanding Animated Program (More Than One Hour)	Star Wars: Clone Wars	Won	
2005	Star Wars: Clone Wars	Outstanding Individual Achievement in Animation	Justin Thompson	Won	
2013	Star Wars: Clone Wars	Outstanding Special Class Animated Program	Star Wars: The Clone Wars	Won	
2013	Star Wars: Clone Wars	Outstanding Performer in an Animated Program	Jim Cummings	Nominated	
2013	Star Wars: Clone Wars	Outstanding Performer in an Animated Program	David Tennant	Won	
2013	Star Wars: Clone Wars	Outstanding Performer in an Animated Program	Sam Witwer	Nominated	
2013	Star Wars: Clone Wars	Outstanding Directing in an Animated Program	Dave Filoni, Kyle Dunlevy, Brian Kalin O'Connell, Steward Lee, Bosco Ng	Nominated	
2013	Star Wars: Clone Wars	Outstanding Music Direction and Composition	Kevin Kiner	Nominated	
2013	Star Wars: Clone Wars	Outstanding Sound Mixing – Animation	David Acord & Cameron Davis	Nominated	
2014	Star Wars: Clone Wars	Outstanding Special Class Animated Program	Star Wars: The Clone Wars	Won	
2014	Star Wars: Clone Wars	Outstanding Individual Achievement in Animation	Christopher Voy	Won	
2014	Star Wars: Clone Wars	Outstanding Achievement in Sound Mixing – Animation	Cameron Davis, David Acord, Frank Rinella, and Mark Evans	Nominated	
2014	Star Wars: Clone Wars	Outstanding Achievement in Sound Editing – Animation	Matthew Wood, Dean Menta, Jeremy Bowker, Erik Foreman, Pascal Garneau, Steve Slanec, Frank Rinella, Dennie Thorpe, Jana Vance, and David Acord	Nominated	
2015	Star Wars: Clone Wars	Outstanding Special Class Animated Program	Star Wars: The Clone Wars	Nominated	
2015	Star Wars: Clone Wars	Outstanding Performer in an Animated Program	Mark Hamill	Nominated	
2015	Star Wars: Clone Wars	Outstanding Writing in an Animated Program	Christian Taylor	Nominated	
2015	Star Wars: Clone Wars	Outstanding Directing in an Animated Program	Dave Filoni, Brian Kalin O'Connell, Danny Keller, Steward Lee	Nominated	
2015	Star Wars: Clone Wars	Outstanding Sound Mixing – Animation	Cameron Davis, David Acord, Frank Rinella, Mark Evans	Nominated	
2015	Star Wars: Clone Wars	Outstanding Sound Mixing – Animation	Matthew Wood, David Acord, Dean Menta, Jeremy Bowker, Steve Slanec, Andrea Gard, Kevin Sellers, Dennie Thorpe, and Jana Vance	Nominated	
2015	Star Wars: Clone Wars	Outstanding Music Direction and Composition	Kevin Kiner	Nominated	
2017	Star Wars Rebels	Outstanding Children's Program	Star Wars Rebels	Nominated	
2018	Star Wars Rebels	Outstanding Children's Program	Star Wars Rebels	Nominated	
2018	Star Wars Rebels	Outstanding Music Composition for a Series (Original Dramatic Score)	Kevin Kiner for "Family Reunion – and Farewell"	Nominated	
2018	Star Wars Rebels	Outstanding Sound Editing for a Comedy or Drama Series (Half-Hour) and Animation	Matthew Wood, David Acord, Bonnie Wild, Sean Kiner, Ronni Brown, Margie O'Malley for "A World Between Worlds"	Nominated	
2019	Star Wars Resistance	Outstanding Children's Program	Star Wars Resistance	Nominated	
2020	The Mandalorian	Outstanding Drama Series	Jon Favreau, Dave Filoni, Kathleen Kennedy, Colin Wilson and Karen Gilchrist	Nominated	
2020	The Mandalorian	Outstanding Character Voice-Over Performance	Taika Waititi as IG-11 (for "Chapter 8: Redemption")	Nominated	
2020	The Mandalorian	Outstanding Cinematography for a Single-Camera Series (Half-Hour)	Greig Fraser and Baz Idoine (for "Chapter 7: The Reckoning")	Won	
2020	The Mandalorian	Outstanding Fantasy/Sci-Fi Costumes	Joseph Porro, Julie Robar, Gigi Melton and Lauren Silvestri (for "Chapter 3: The Sin")	Nominated	
2020	The Mandalorian	Outstanding Guest Actor in a Drama Series	Giancarlo Esposito as Moff Gideon (for "Chapter 8: Redemption")	Nominated	
2020	The Mandalorian	Outstanding Music Composition for a Series	Ludwig Göransson (for "Chapter 8: Redemption")	Won	
2020	The Mandalorian	Outstanding Production Design for a Narrative Program (Half-Hour or Less)	Andrew L. Jones, Jeff Wisniewski, Amanda Serino (for "Chapter 1: The Mandalorian")	Won	
2020	The Mandalorian	Outstanding Prosthetic Makeup for a Series, Limited Series, Movie or Special	Brian Sipe, Alexei Dmitriew, Carlton Coleman, Samantha Ward, Scott Stoddard, Mike Ornelaz and Sabrina Castro (for "Chapter 6: The Prisoner")	Nominated	
2020	The Mandalorian	Outstanding Single-Camera Picture Editing for a Drama Series	Andrew S. Eisen (for "Chapter 2: The Child")	Nominated	
2020	The Mandalorian	Outstanding Single-Camera Picture Editing for a Drama Series	Dana E. Glauberman and Dylan Firshein (for "Chapter 4: Sanctuary")	Nominated	
2020	The Mandalorian	Outstanding Single-Camera Picture Editing for a Drama Series	Jeff Seibenick (for "Chapter 8: Redemption")	Nominated	
2020	The Mandalorian	Outstanding Sound Editing for a Comedy or Drama Series (Half-Hour) and Animation	David Acord, Matthew Wood, Bonnie Wild, James Spencer, Richard Quinn, Richard Gould, Stephanie McNally, Ryan Rubin, Ronni Brown and Jana Vance (for "Chapter 1: The Mandalorian")	Won	
2020	The Mandalorian	Outstanding Sound Mixing for a Comedy or Drama Series (Half-Hour) and Animation	Shawn Holden, Bonnie Wild and Chris Fogel (for "Chapter 2: The Child")	Won	
2020	The Mandalorian	Outstanding Special Visual Effects	Richard Bluff, Jason Porter, Abbigail Keller, Hayden Jones, Hal Hickel, Roy Cancino, John Rosengrant, Enrico Damm and Landis Fields (for "Chapter 2: The Child")	Won	
2020	The Mandalorian	Outstanding Stunt Coordination for a Drama Series, Limited Series or Movie	Ryan Watson	Won	
2021	Star Wars: The Clone Wars	Outstanding Music Direction and Composition for a Preschool, Children's or Animated Program	Star Wars: The Clone Wars	Nominated	
2021	Star Wars: The Clone Wars	Outstanding Sound Mixing and Sound Editing for a Daytime Animated Program	Star Wars: The Clone Wars	Won	
2021	Star Wars: The Clone Wars	Outstanding Writing Team for a Daytime Animated Program	Star Wars: The Clone Wars	Nominated	

== Abandoned projects ==
=== Underworld ===
In 2005, plans for a live-action television series set between the prequel and original trilogies were announced at Star Wars Celebration. In 2007, Lucas described the project as "one show that will split into four shows, focusing on different characters." It entered development in early 2009. The series was described as "gritty and dark" and was expected to feature characters such as Han Solo, Chewbacca, Lando Calrissian, Boba Fett, C-3PO, and Emperor Palpatine. Lucas described the series as "more talky. It's more of what I would call a soap opera with a bunch of personal dramas in it. It's not really based on action-adventure films from the '30s—it's actually more based on film noir movies from the '40s!" Producer Rick McCallum revealed the working title, Star Wars: Underworld, in 2012, and that it would focus on criminal and political power struggles in the "period when the Empire is trying to take things over."

Over one hundred 42-minute episodes were planned, with 50 scripts written. These were mostly second drafts, but due to their complex content, were too expensive to produce. Ronald D. Moore was one of the writers, and extensive artwork including character, costume, and set designs were developed at Skywalker Ranch under the close supervision of Lucas and McCallum. The project was still being considered after Lucasfilm was sold to Disney, including by ABC, with stories being reviewed as of December 2015. According to Kathleen Kennedy,

That's an area we've spent a lot of time, reading through the material that he developed is something we very much would like to explore. ... So our attitude is, we don't want to throw any of that stuff away. It's gold. And it's something we're spending a lot of time looking at, pouring [sic] through, discussing, and we may very well develop those things further. We definitely want to.

The plot of the anthology film Rogue One was originally pitched as an episode of the series. The story of Han winning the Millennium Falcon from Lando was planned to be featured and later developed as Solo: A Star Wars Story. The planet Daiyu portrayed in Obi-Wan Kenobi is similar to the atmosphere of level 1313 of Coruscant which George Lucas wanted to show. Boba Fett was also reported to appear in the show; Star Wars author, Karen Traviss, was to write a novel involving Boba Fett, but the project was reportedly canceled because of possible conflicts with the TV series. In early 2020, Stargate Studios shared test footage made to promote the series to networks, as well as a Google Doc listing production details for the series.

=== Rangers of the New Republic ===
In December 2020, Rangers of the New Republic was announced. Developed by Favreau and Filoni, it was planned to tie into The Mandalorian, The Book of Boba Fett, and Ahsoka. Variety reported in May 2021 that the series was not in active development. In an interview with Empire published in November 2021, Kathleen Kennedy said development had not reached a point where scripts were written and that she felt some of the ideas for the series would "figure into future episodes ... of the next iteration of Mandalorian". Empire cited Gina Carano's departure from Lucasfilm as a possible reason for the halting of the series, implying that her character, Cara Dune, was intended to star in it. A Mandalorian spin-off series centered on her character had been rumored by late 2020, but after Carano posted controversial social media statements in November 2020 and February 2021, Disney severed ties with the actress.

== See also ==
- List of Star Wars films
- Lego Star Wars § Films and videos
- List of Star Wars cast members
- List of Star Wars characters
