= Elliot M. Bour =

American film director

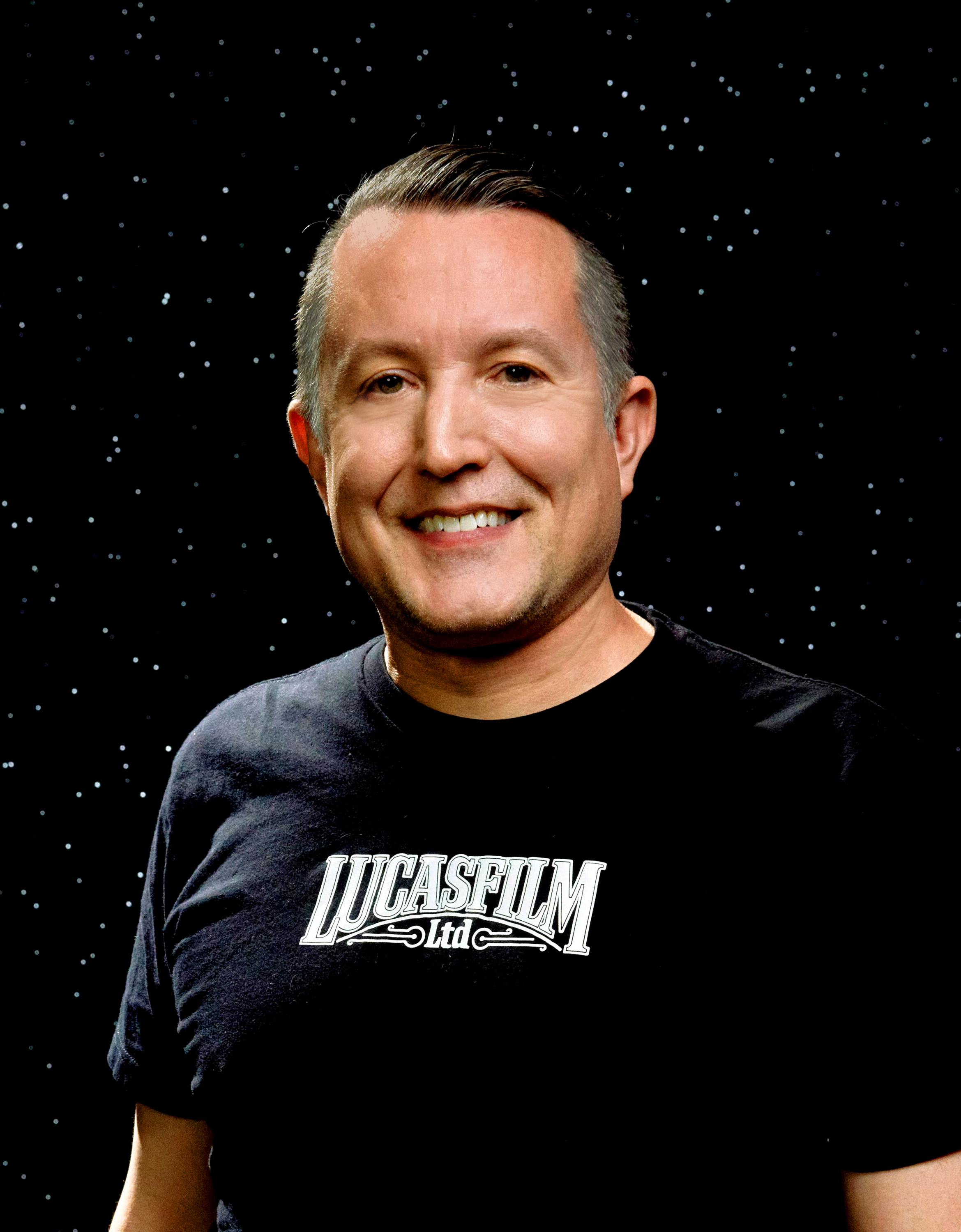
- Born: March 20, 1969 (age 57); Philadelphia, Pennsylvania
- Occupations: Film Director, Animator, Story artist
- Website: www.elliotbour.com

Elliot M. Bour (born March 20, 1969, in Philadelphia, Pennsylvania) is an American director, animator and story artist working in film, television and commercials.

== Filmography ==
=== Director ===
- Star Wars: Young Jedi Adventures (2023)
- The Chicken Squad (2021)
- Elena of Avalor (2016–2020)
- Pixie Hollow Bake Off (2013)
- The Little Engine That Could (2011)
- Kronk's New Groove (2005)
- Pooh's Heffalump Halloween Movie (2005)
- Winnie the Pooh: Springtime with Roo (2004)
- Spy Groove (2000–2001)

=== Animator ===
- Mulan (1998)
- Pocahontas (1995)
- The Lion King (1994)
- Trail Mix-Up (1993)
- Aladdin (1992)
- Beauty and the Beast (1991)
