= Star Wars: Young Jedi Adventures =

American animated television series

- Genre: Preschool; Science fiction
- Based on: Star Wars by George Lucas
- Developed by: Michael Olson; Shellie Kvilvang-O'Brien; Lamont Magee; James Waugh; Josh Rimes
- Showrunner: Michael Olson
- Directed by: Eden Riegel
- Voices of: Jamaal Avery Jr.; JeCobi Swain; Ja'Siah Young; Emma Berman; Juliet Donenfeld; Dee Bradley Baker; Jonathan Lipow; Piotr Michael
- Composer: Matthew Margeson
- Country of origin: United States
- Original language: English
- No. of seasons: 3
- No. of episodes: 55 (list of episodes)

Production
- Executive producers: James Waugh; Jacqui Lopez; Josh Rimes; Michael Olson
- Running time: 24 minutes
- Production companies: Lucasfilm; Lucasfilm Animation; Wild Canary Animation

Original release
- Network: Disney+; Disney Jr.
- Release: May 4, 2023 – December 8, 2025

Related
- Star Wars: The High Republic

Star Wars: Young Jedi Adventures is an American animated children's television series created for the streaming service Disney+ and the television network Disney Jr. It is part of the Star Wars franchise and follows a group of younglings as they learn to become Jedi Knights during the High Republic era, centuries before the main Star Wars films. The series is produced by Lucasfilm Animation and Wild Canary Animation, with Michael Olson as showrunner and Elliot Bour as supervising director. It is the first full-length animated Star Wars television series targeted at young audiences.

The series stars Jamaal Avery Jr., JeCobi Swain, Ja'Siah Young, Emma Berman, Juliet Donenfeld, Dee Bradley Baker, Jonathan Lipow, and Piotr Michael. It was announced in May 2022, with Olson and Bour already attached to the project. Casting was revealed in February 2023. Six shorts were released on YouTube ahead of the series premiere, before also becoming available on Disney+.

Star Wars: Young Jedi Adventures premiered on May 4, 2023, and was positively received, with critics praising the show for being an engaging first Star Wars experience for young viewers. The second season premiered on August 14, 2024. The third and final season was released on December 8, 2025.

== Premise ==
Set during the High Republic era, centuries before the events of the main Star Wars films, Star Wars: Young Jedi Adventures follows a group of younglings as they learn the ways of the Force, including compassion, self-discipline, teamwork and patience, to become Jedi Knights.

== Episodes ==
Season	Episodes		Originally released
1	25	7	May 4, 2023
1	25	6	August 2, 2023
1	25	6	November 8, 2023
1	25	6	February 14, 2024
2	23	11	August 14, 2024
2	23	12	March 19, 2025
3	7		December 8, 2025

== Cast and characters ==
- Jamaal Avery Jr. (season 1), JeCobi Swain (seasons 1–2) and Ja'Siah Young (season 3) as Kai Brightstar: a human Jedi youngling who hopes to become a Jedi Knight. Avery Jr. reprises his role as Kai in the series epilogue.
- Juliet Donenfeld as Lys Solay, a Pantoran Jedi youngling who is Kai's best friend
- Dee Bradley Baker as Nubs, a Pooba Jedi youngling who is Kai's other best friend
  - Baker also voices several other characters, most notably Chigg, an Abednedo pirate who reforms and becomes an exotic fruit seller, and Slegg, a Nosaurian member of the Comet Runners pirate crew
- Emma Berman as Nash Durango, a pilot who is friends with the younglings, and frequently assists them on their adventures
- Jonathan Lipow as RJ-83, Nash’s droid and co-pilot
  - Lipow also voices several other droids, including Dee, the Tenoo temple droid; RC-99, the droid working for Raxlo; and K-13, Rek Minuu’s security droid
- Piotr Michael as Yoda, The Grand Master of the Jedi order
- Nasim Pedrad as Zia Zaldor Zanna (seasons 1-2), a human female Jedi Master who serves as a teacher to the Jedi younglings studying on planet Tenoo
- Trey Diaz Murphy as Prince Cyrus Vuundir / Taborr Val Dorn, the prince of Vuundalla who leads a double life as the pirate Taborr
- Eric Bauza as EB-3, Taborr’s droid crew member
- Sarah Kramer as Pord, Taborr’s Gamorrean crew member
  - Kramer also voices several other characters, inclusing Gossi, a Theelin member of the Comet Runners pirate crew
- Grey DeLisle as Sellaccc Orryak (seasons 1-2), the Trandoshan captain of the Ganguls pirate crew
- Taran Killam as Hap, the Latero proprietor of Hap’s Sap Tap, a local bistro on Tenoo
  - Killam also voices Jooro Jarrot (seasons 1-2), a Quarren member of the Ganguls pirate crew, better known as Speeds.
- Shelby Young as Toda-Joh (seasons 1-2), the small Anzellan member of the Ganguls pirate crew
- Gunnar Sizemore as Wes Vinik (seasons 2-3), Master Zia's new Padawan
- Cree Summer as Marlaa Jinara, the Chadra-Fan owner of a junk shop on Tenoo
- Sam Riegel as Corr Taldaan (seasons 1-2), the Palliduvan captain of the Comet Runners pirate crew
- Haley Joel Osment as Raxlo, a Gozzo developer constantly looking for business opportunities
- Michael Sinterniklaas as 0G-LC, a pilot droid exploring the Outer Rim Territories for the Jedi order
- Matt Surgess as SF-R3 (seasons 1-2), a safari droid, better know as Aree, who chonicles wildlife for the Galactic Society of Creature Enthusiasts
- Mason Wertheimer as Rek Minuu (season 3), a droidsmith

== Production ==
=== Development ===
Star Wars: Young Jedi Adventures, the first full-length animated Star Wars series targeted at young audiences and their families, was announced at Star Wars Celebration in May 2022. It is set during the High Republic era, centuries before the events of the main Star Wars films, which was already being explored through a series of books and comics at the time. The series was announced by executive producer James Waugh, executive producer and showrunner Michael Olson, supervising director Elliot Bour, and consulting producer Lamont Magee. Lucasfilm's Jacqui Lopez and Josh Rimes are also executive producers. Waugh said the creative team were aware that the series could be the first introduction to Star Wars for some children. Though they wanted the "characters, tone, and the life lessons" in each episode to be aimed at the younger audience, they also wanted to stay true to the expectations of people familiar with Star Wars.

The series' second season was produced by Lucasfilm in collaboration with Wild Canary while Icon Creative provided production services. Lamont McGee also joined as consulting producer for the series.

=== Casting and voice recording ===
At the D23 Expo in September 2022, Jamaal Avery Jr. and Emma Berman were announced as cast in the series' lead roles of Kai Brightstar and Nash Durango, respectively. In February 2023, it was announced that Juliet Donenfeld was cast as Lys Solay, Dee Bradley Baker as Nubs, Jonathan Lipow as RJ-83, and Piotr Michael as Yoda. In January 2024, Marcus Scribner, Justine Lee and Liam O'Brien were announced as new cast members for the roles of Bell Zettifar, Republic Supreme Chancellor Lina Soh and Jedi Master Maru for the final batch of the first-season episodes released on February 14, 2024. In addition, JeCo Swain was announced to be playing Kai Brightstar alongside Avery Jr.

The actors recorded their lines remotely with the screenwriters and showrunners bringing together their voice performances at the studio. Baker, who voiced a non-English speaking character Nubs, said his fellow protagonists Kai and Lys reinforced what their friend was saying in the series in a similar way to the relationship between Han Solo and Chewbacca. Baker also recorded multiple options for Nubs' lines for the showrunners to select for each scene. Since the series was aimed at the preschooler demographic, the showrunners ruled out the use of subtitles for Nubs' vocalizations.

In June 2024, Gunnar Sizemore was cast as Wes Vinik, Jedi Master Zia's new Padawan for the second season. In November 2025, Ja'Siah Young, Mason Wertheimer and April Winchell were cast as Kai Brightstar, Rek Minuu and Dotti for the third season.

=== Music ===
Matthew Margeson was hired to compose the score for the series by late July 2022.

== Release ==
Star Wars: Young Jedi Adventures premiered on the streaming service Disney+ and the television network Disney Jr. on May 4, 2023, Star Wars Day. The first two episodes premiered at Star Wars Celebration Europe on April 8, 2023. Three animated shorts introducing the characters of the series premiered on the Disney Jr. YouTube channel on March 27, 2023, with an additional three releasing by April 24, before all six were released on Disney+ on April 26.

Six more episodes were released on Disney+ and Disney Jr. on August 2, 2023; further episodes were released on November 8, with the final six episodes being released on February 14, 2024. The first season consisted of 25 episodes.

An additional set of shorts were released on August 2, 2024, while the second season premiered with its first half on August 14.

On January 31, 2025, Lucasfilm confirmed that the second half of the second season would be released on March 19. In addition, further Fun with Nubs digital shorts were released, commencing February 1.

On April 18, 2025, during the Star Wars Celebration Japan, it was announced that the series had been renewed for a third season. The seven episodes of the third season were released in their entirety on Disney+ and Disney Jr. on December 8, 2025. The third season served as the series' final season.

== Reception ==
=== Viewership ===
According to market research company Parrot Analytics, which looks at consumer engagement in consumer research, streaming, downloads, and on social media, Star Wars: Young Jedi Adventures ranked as the fifth most in-demand series on Disney+ during the week of January 16–22, 2023. It ranked second among the most in-demand breakout shows, achieving 23.1 times the average series demand during the week of April 29-May 5, 2023. This represented a 69% increase in demand from an earlier period.

=== Critical response ===
Arezou Amin of Collider gave the series an "A" rating, stating that it "captured the Star Wars spirit for younglings of all ages". She described the main cast members as being relatable to children and praised the series for relying on a character-focused approach, which explored new characters as opposed to depending on long-established characters to advance the story. Brett White at Decider gave the series a positive review, describing it as a "fun show and a fine introduction to Star Wars" for the preschooler demographic. While noting its low stakes plots, White praised the series for emphasizing life lessons and described the action sequences as "feeling like Star Wars" rather than a "preschool approximation" of the franchise.

=== Accolades ===
Award	Year	Category	Recipient(s)	Result	Ref.
Children's and Family Emmy Awards	2023	Outstanding Preschool Animated Series	Carmen Italia, Jacqui Lopez, Richard Marlis, Michael Olson, Josh Rimes, James Waugh, Jeannine Hodson, Shea Wageman, Brenda Dewet, Jennifer Rogan and Lamont Magee	Nominated	
Children's and Family Emmy Awards	2023	Outstanding Music Direction and Composition for an Animated Program	Matthew Margeson	Nominated	
Children's and Family Emmy Awards	2023	Outstanding Main Title and Graphics	Elliot Bour, Ranjit Dighe and Bill Breneisen	Nominated	
Children's and Family Emmy Awards	2023	Outstanding Editing for a Preschool Animated Program	Danielle Altura, Zachary Bulman, Pamela Cabrera, Petrus Gammelgard, Brian Dawley and Louis Legge	Won	
Children's and Family Emmy Awards	2023	Outstanding Sound Mixing and Sound Editing for a Preschool Animated Program	Fil Brown, Melissa Ellis, Heather Olsen, David Bonilla, John "J" Lampinen and Robbi Smith	Won	
Children's and Family Emmy Awards	2024	Outstanding Editing for a Preschool Animated Program	Louis Legge and Brian Dawley	Nominated	
Children's and Family Emmy Awards	2024	Outstanding Sound Mixing and Sound Editing for a Preschool Animated Program	Heather Olsen, Fil Brown, Melissa Ellis, Robbi Smith, John "J" Lampinen, David Bonilla	Won	
Children's and Family Emmy Awards	2024	Outstanding Music Direction and Composition for an Animated Program	Matthew Margeson	Nominated	
Children's and Family Emmy Awards	2024	Outstanding Voice Directing for an Animated Series	Eden Riegel	Nominated	
Children's and Family Emmy Awards	2025	Outstanding Voice Performer in a Preschool Program	Dee Bradley Baker	Nominated	
Children's and Family Emmy Awards	2025	Outstanding Directing for a Preschool Animated Series	Anthony Bell, Shellie Kvilvang-O'Brien, Casey Lowe, and Elliot M. Bour (for "The Battle of Tenoo")	Nominated	
Children's and Family Emmy Awards	2025	Outstanding Editing for a Preschool Animated Program	Brian Dawley, Louis Legge, and Joe Stucky (for "The Battle of Tenoo")	Nominated	
Children's and Family Emmy Awards	2025	Outstanding Sound Mixing and Sound Editing for a Preschool Animated Program	Fil Brown, Melissa Ellis, Robbi Smith, J. Lampinen, David Bonilla, and Heather Olsen (for "The Battle of Tenoo")	Won	
Golden Reel Awards	2024	Outstanding Achievement in Sound Editing – Broadcast Animation	Heather Olsen, Robbi Smith, David Bonilla and John "J" Lampinen (for "The Young Jedi/Yoda's Mission")	Nominated	
Kidscreen Awards	2024	Preschool Programming – Best New Series	Star Wars: Young Jedi Adventures	Won (Note: Tied with SuperKitties)	
TCA Awards	2023	Outstanding Achievement in Children's Programming	Carmen Italia, Jacqui Lopez, Richard Marlis, Michael Olson, Josh Rimes, James Waugh, Jeannine Hodson, Shea Wageman, Brenda Dewet, Jennifer Rogan and Lamont Magee	Nominated	
