= Emma Berman =

American actress (born 2008 or 2009)

- Born: Emma J. Berman; 2008 or 2009 (age 17–18); San Francisco, California, U.S.
- Occupation: Voice actress
- Years active: 2018–present

Emma J. Berman (born 2008 or 2009) is an American voice actress. She is best known for voicing Giulia Marcovaldo in Pixar's animated feature film Luca. She also voiced Ginny in the Disney Junior television series SuperKitties and Nash Durango in the Disney Junior television series Star Wars: Young Jedi Adventures.

== Early life ==
Berman was born in San Francisco, California to Russian Jewish parents.

== Career ==
Berman began her acting career performing in local theatre productions with the Bay Area Children's Theatre and 42nd Street Moon in San Francisco. She also voiced six of LeapFrog toys.

She had a guest role in the children's show Abby Hatcher as Flugtilda in the 2019 episode "Cousin Flugtilda". In 2021, Berman appeared on three episodes of Go! Go! Cory Carson as Winifred Wings, and made her breakout role in Disney-Pixar's Luca as Giulia Marcovaldo. In 2023, she was cast in two voice roles for the Disney Junior TV shows SuperKitties as Ginny and Star Wars: Young Jedi Adventures as Nash Durango. In 2024, she had a guest role in Spidey and His Amazing Friends as the voice of Squirrel Girl in the 2024 episode "Now You See Me, Now You Don't/Meet Squirrel Girl".

== Filmography ==
=== Film ===
Year	Title	Role	Notes
2021	Luca	Giulia Marcovaldo (voice)	
2021	Go! Go! Cory Carson: Chrissy Takes the Wheel	Winifred Wings (voice)	

=== Television ===
Year	Title	Role	Notes
2019	Abby Hatcher	Flugtilda (voice)	Episode: "Cousin Flugtilda"
2021	Go! Go! Cory Carson	Winifred Wings (voice)	3 episodes
2023–present	SuperKitties	Ginny (voice)	Main role
2023–2025	Star Wars: Young Jedi Adventures	Nash Durango (voice)	Main role
2024–2025	Spidey and His Amazing Friends	Squirrel Girl (voice)	3 episodes
