= List of Star Wars: Young Jedi Adventures episodes =

Star Wars: Young Jedi Adventures is an American animated children's television series created for the streaming service Disney+ and the television network Disney Jr. It is part of the Star Wars franchise and follows a group of younglings as they learn to become Jedi Knights during the High Republic era, centuries before the main Star Wars films. It is the first full-length animated Star Wars series targeted at young audiences.

During the course of the series, 55 episodes of Star Wars: Young Jedi Adventures aired over three seasons, concluding on December 8, 2025.

== Series overview ==
Season	Episodes		Originally released
1	25	7	May 4, 2023
1	25	6	August 2, 2023
1	25	6	November 8, 2023
1	25	6	February 14, 2024
2	23	11	August 14, 2024
2	23	12	March 19, 2025
3	7		December 8, 2025

== Episodes ==
=== Season 1 (2023–24) ===
No. overall	No. in season	Title	Directed by	Written by	Disney+ release date	Disney Junior air date
1	1	"The Young Jedi"	Anthony Bell	Michael Olson	May 4, 2023	May 4, 2023
1	1	"Yoda's Mission"	Casey Lowe	Michael Olson & Lamont Magee	May 4, 2023	May 4, 2023
Master Yoda sends several younglings led by Master Zia to continue their training at an outpost Jedi temple on Tenoo. Kai Brightstar, Lys Solay and Nubs catch a ride with Nash Durango and her droid RJ-83. Upon arriving on Tenoo, they stop Taborr Val Dorn and his pirate gang associates Pord and EB-3 from robbing a local cafe. After settling into their new home, Yoda sends Kai and his friends on a mission to retrieve seeds for the Kublop Spring festival. Taborr and his gang steal the seeds but the Jedi retrieve them. During the retrieval mission, Kai chooses to lose his lightsaber in order to save his friend Nubs. Following the festival, Yoda gifts Kai his green training lightsaber.
2	2	"Nash's Race Day"	Anthony Bell	Julius Harper	May 4, 2023	May 4, 2023
2	2	"The Lost Jedi Ship"	Shellie Kvilvang-O'Brien	Katie Kaniewski	May 4, 2023	May 4, 2023
Kai, Lys and Nubs join Nash in a skiff race in the rivers of Kublop Spring. Master Zia allows the younglings to participate on the condition that they do not use their Force powers to cheat. Nash aspires to beat her wealthy rival Raena Zess, who has won the previous races for years. During the race, Raena cheats and gains the lead. Working together, Nash's Team Crimson Bolt are able to catch up with her, coming second place. After their ships get stuck in muddy banks during the race, the two teams are forced to put aside their differences to free their skiffs. Team Crimson Bolt ultimately wins the race. Raena accepts defeat and promises not to cheat again. While visiting the Tenoo Jedi Temple's library, Kai and his friends discover a starship tracker linked to a lost Old Republic starship called the Star Seeker. With Master Zia's permission, the younglings enlist Nash and RJ-83 on a quest to find the lost ship. After navigating an asteroid field, they land on an uncharted planet and find the lost ship and its pilot OG-LC. Despite his track record as a brave explorer, OG-LC has developed a fear of asteroids. With the encouragement of the Jedi younglings and Nash, OG-LC manages to fly his ship out of the asteroid field and continue his mission to Tenoo. His confidence restored, OG-LC continues his mission to explore worlds.
3	3	"Get Well Nubs"	Casey Lowe	Brian Hall	May 4, 2023	May 12, 2023
3	3	"The Junk Giant"	Anthony Bell	Mia Resella	May 4, 2023	May 12, 2023
After Nubs falls sick prior to an upcoming school trip to the Kublop Geyser, Kai and Lys embark on a mission to acquire Yara tree leaves, which have healing properties. During the quest, the two navigate a nearby river which leads to a giant Tenoo tree, where the Yara tree grows at its top. Working together, the two younglings climb the giant tree and confront a territorial gangul beast. Following their successful mission, the younglings join their classmates and Master Yia in watching the Kublop Geyser erupt. Kai, Lys, Nubs, Nash and RJ-83 help the Chadra-Fan junk dealer Marlaa Jinara investigate a series of thefts at her junk yard. The five discover that Taborr, EB-3 and Podd have stolen parts to build a Junk Giant to impress the other pirates. The pirates use the Junk Giant in an attempt to steal a statue of Kublop Springs' founder, Kaliah Kublop. After the Junk Giant damages his left hand, the pirates abandon him but the Jedi and Durango are able to convince him of his inherent value as a droid. The Junk Giant is adopted by Marlaa, who names him JG-1 and finds him work at her junkyard.
4	4	"Lys and the Snowy Mountain Rescue"	Shellie Kvilvang-O'Brien	Katie Kaniewski	May 4, 2023	May 19, 2023
4	4	"Attack of the Training Droids"	Casey Lowe	Brian Hall	May 4, 2023	May 19, 2023
At Varna's invitation, Master Zia sends Kai, Lys and Nubs to help Gumar and Jam herd wellagrins on the snowy planet of Andraven. The children accompany seal-like Wellagrins on their migration through the mountains. During the mission, the group are scattered by an avalanche but work together to find the herd and Jam. After being caught in a second avalanche, they ride their Wellagrin steeds to safety. They reunite with Nash and their host Varna at a village on the other side of the mountains. Kai, Lys and Nubs fail to retrieve a beacon from a training droid. To spend more time training, Kai reprograms the three training droids to stack objects in the training field. However, the droids begin stacking other objects at the Tenoo Jedi Temple including trays, clothes, and books. With the help of Nash and RJ-83, the younglings are able to power down the droids. The children apologize to Masters Yoda and Zia and clean up the mess. Having learnt about the folly of using shortcuts, Yoda invites Kai and his friends to train with him. They succeed in retrieving a beacon.
5	5	"The Jellyfruit Pursuit"	Shellie Kvilvang-O'Brien	Julius Harper	May 4, 2023	May 26, 2023
5	5	"Creature Safari"	Casey Lowe	Mia Resella	May 4, 2023	May 26, 2023
Taborr's gang steal jellyfruits from the Rodian farmer Weebo and her grandson, disrupting Kublop Springs' upcoming Jellfruit Festival. Nash, Kai, Lys and Nubs infiltrate Yarrum Tower disguised as pirates, befriending the friendly Abednedo pirate Chigg. They catch up with Taborr's gang, who attempt to flee with the stolen jellyfruit. In the process, their hover-sled spirals out of control, falling over the edge of Yarrum Tower. The Jedi younglings use their Force powers to levitate the jellyfruit crate to safety. Taborr and his gang are humiliated by the other pirates for their failure. As consolation, Nash offers Taborr a fruit and invites several pirates to attend the Jellyfruit Festival. Kai, Lys and Nubs accompany Aree and CAM of the Galactic Society of Creature Enthusiasts on a wildlife safari on the planet Yamradi. While researching a species of critters known as Chylarro, CAM is kidnapped by an undiscovered bird species known as the burrowberry bird. The Jedi younglings help a distraught Aree to rescue his droid friend, whom he believes is being eaten by the bird. During an unsuccessful rescue attempt in the burrowberry bird's burrow, Aree is captured. Lys discovers that the burrowberry bird mistook the droids for shiny berries. The Jedi attempt a second rescue mission and discover Aree and CAM have befriended the bird and its chicks. To honor Lys for her role in rescuing him and CAM, Aree allows Lys to christen the new bird species.
6	6	"Squadron"	Anthony Bell	Katie Kaniewski	May 4, 2023	June 2, 2023
6	6	"Forest Defenders"	Shellie Kvilvang-O'Brien	Brian Hall	May 4, 2023	June 2, 2023
Kai learns to fly the Crimson Firehawk under the guidance of Nash. Due to his inexperience, he causes some damage to the starship. Back at the Tenoo Jedi Temple, Master Zia sends Kai, Lys and Nubs to collect Jedi Vector trainers from the Mon Calamari Zepher on Tenoo's largest moon. Durango flies her friends there and takes them on a test flight. During the test flight, Kai awakens a space slug while attempting a "throttle buster" maneuver. After the slug swallows his friends, Kai under Nash's guidance leads the space slug on a chase and frees his friends. Master Zia decides the younglings are ready to start flight lessons. While visiting the Federian forests the younglings and RJ-83 discover that the Gozzo logger Raxlo has been cutting down vast tracts of forests, displacing the native squirrel-like skriffle creatures. After befriending several skriffles, the younglings attempt to reason with Raxlo but the greedy logger wants to chop down all of the planet's forests to export as building material. The younglings and RJ-83 join forces to stop Raxlo from chopping down the largest Federian tree. Defeated, Raxlo retreats and vows never to return. The younglings update Master Zia while reflecting on how the forest is home to various animals.
7	7	"The Jedi and the Thief"	Anthony Bell	Julius Harper	May 4, 2023	June 9, 2023
7	7	"The Missing Kibbin"	Shellie Kvilvang-O'Brien	Mia Resella	May 4, 2023	June 9, 2023
Kai and his friends dress a training droid as their enemy Taborr, much to the dismay of Master Zia. Zia invites Kai on a trip to a desert world to purchase a new cooling unit for the Tenoo Jedi Temple. During the trip, their Jedi shuttle is stolen by Ace Kallisto, an old acquaintance of Zia who has become a career thief. After Kai accidentally crashes the shuttle, Zia convinces him to put aside his distrust of Ace and work together to summon help. Ace saves Brightstar from being mauled by two large stalaat predators. Reflecting on their adventures, Kai learns that not all thieves are bad and comes to believe that Taborr is capable of changing. Kai, Lys and Nubs team up with the Dowutin bounty hunter Ansen Strung to recapture Raena's runaway pet kibbin Figgles. While Strung is not used to teamwork, he reluctantly accepts the Jedi younglings' help. Following a series of clues, they track Figgles to Marlaa's junkyard. However, the kibbin escapes after Strung attempts to capture the creature on his own. Unwilling to give up, the Jedi younglings and Strung use channelfish dumplings to lure and trap Figgles. The four then return Figgles to Raena. Having learned the importance of teamwork, Strung decides to treat the Jedi younglings to a meal.
8	8	"The Girl and Her Gargantua"	Shellie Kvilvang-O'Brien	Julius Harper	August 2, 2023	August 2, 2023
8	8	"The Show Must Go On"	Casey Lowe	Mia Resella	August 2, 2023	August 2, 2023
Kai, Lys and Nubs accompany Aree on a mission to deliver several animals including a gargantua to Sil Gohtta's Nature Preserve. Solay befriends the gargantua during the voyage, whom she names "Garganchie." During a fuel stop on a desert world with red sand, two Besalisk siblings named Slaygh and Braygh stow aboard the ship and accidentally release Garganchie. After rampaging through the town, Garganchie flees to a cave. The Jedi younglings manage to find him but the Besalisk siblings frighten him again, causing him to go on a second rampage in the town. Lys convinces the locals to stay calm and Garganchie manages to save the Besalisks from falling down a tower. The Besalisks apologize for antagonising Garganchie and the group bring the gargantua to its new home. Nash organizes a concert featuring her favourite band, the Ku-Bops. However, the rumble bass player Bruff has gone missing, much to the dismay of Nash and the band singer Metz. While Kai and Nubs help the droids to set up the band's musical equipment, Lys joins Nash and Metz in the search for Bruff. They eventually find an upset Bruff by Kublop Spring's dock. Bruff is unhappy that Metz does not allow him to sing. While the two argue, they fall into a boat which almost falls over the edge of the nearby waterfall. After Nash and the others rescue them, the two musicians reconcile with Metz allowing Bruff to sing at their concert.
9	9	"The Princess and the Jedi"	Casey Lowe	Brian Hall	August 2, 2023	August 11, 2023
9	9	"Kai's Bad Day"	Anthony Bell	Christian Streaty	August 2, 2023	August 11, 2023
After Princess Inaya's transport breaks down, she hires the services of Nash's shuttle Crimson Firehawk. Kai, Lys, and Nubs come along to help Durango host the princess. The group are pursued by Taborr's gang, whose starship Iron Talon damages the Firehawk's power couplings, causing it to crash in a forest meadow on Tenoo. Taborr's gang steals a present that Inaya had obtained for her father but she manages recover it with the help of the Jedi younglings. Inaya also demonstrates her knowledge of starships which she uses to help repair the Firehawk and disable Taborr's ship. The group return Inaya to her homeworld. After missing a field trip to the lava fields of Tiss'ell, Kai believes he is having a bad day. To cheer him up, Master Zia sends him to accompany Nash and RJ-83 on a mission to Tatooine to deliver a hyperspace capacitor to hyperspace prospector Mycho Zala. On Tatooine, Nash's ship Firehawk is caught in a sandstorm and Kai accidentally releases the capacitor. While trying to recover the package form Jawas, they accidentally barter RJ-83. Kai and Nash infiltrate the Jawas' sandcrawler to rescue RJ but encounter Jawas. The Jawas take them to Mycho who gratefully receives the capacitor and gives the Jawas a tool to secure RJ-83's freedom.
10	10	"Visitor's Day"	Shellie Kvilvang-O'Brien	Katie Kaniewski	August 2, 2023	August 18, 2023
10	10	"The Growing Green Danger"	Casey Lowe	Julius Harper	August 2, 2023	August 18, 2023
Marlaa plans to unveil a new sculpture on Visitor's Day. Posing as an art dealer, the art thief Draiven Bosh and his droids K-2PI and R4-13 steal the Visitor's Day Sculpture. Lys, Kai and Nubs give chase but end up trapped aboard Draiven's starship. Kai contacts Master Zia for help, who tells them to distract Draiven till she arrives. Working together, the younglings distract Draiven until Zia arrives. Following a confrontation, they manage to recover the Visitor's Day Sculpture and other stolen artifacts but Draiven manages to escape. Zia reassures Lys that she can always ask her for help. The Jedi younglings attend Ms. Varish's botany class on the garden world of Langsha-Raang. To reward Nubs for his diligence, Varish gifts him several seeds to take home to Tenoo. However, he accidentally brings home an aggressive grumble vine, which attacks the younglings and causes damage to the temple. Nubs, Kai, and Lys fight back but are grabbed by the grumble vine's vines. Recalling Varish's lesson, Nubs manages to subdue the rogue plant by covering its center, causing it to retreat. After Master Zia returns, the temple is repaired and the grumble vine is transported back to Langsha-Raang for safekeeping.
11	11	"The Ganguls"	Anthony Bell	Brian Hall	August 2, 2023	August 25, 2023
11	11	"Bad Eggs"	Shellie Kvilvang-O'Brien	Charley Feldman	August 2, 2023	August 25, 2023
Nash's new speeder is stolen by a young boy named Ori, who has been coerced by a biker gang known as the Ganguls. The Ganguls, led by Sellaccc Orryak, control the nearby town of Aklyrr Bend, where they pillage and terrorize the citizens. Nash and her Jedi friends find Ori, who tells them about the situation. The four are captured by the Ganguls but convince Ori and the townsfolk to stand up to the gang. The gang flee and abandon their loot including Nash's speeder following a chase. Nash and the Jedi celebrate with Ori and the townspeople. While preparing a stew for his friend Geeli, Hap, along with Kai, Lys and Nubs, have to deal with several rodent-like Tikotiko, who hatch from their eggs. The hungry creatures create chaos in Hap's Sap Tap cafe and the nearby marketplace. After struggling to recapture them, Hap discovers that they are attracted to a new stew he makes. The satisfied Tikotiko fall asleep while Hap and his Jedi friends enjoy a meal with Geeli.
12	12	"Off the Rails"	Casey Lowe	Katie Kaniewski	August 2, 2023	September 1, 2023
12	12	"The Thieves of Tharnaka"	Anthony Bell	Julius Harper	August 2, 2023	September 1, 2023
Kai, Lys, and Nubs travel on a train carrying logs to be used by villagers as building material. On the way to the village, their train is boarded by Taborr and his gang. During the ensuing heist and skirmish, the two train carriages are separated after Taborr accidentally loses the coupling. Kai and Taborr are separated from the others. The two enemies are forced to work together to power up their carriage. Kai learns that Taborr is not as selfish as he thinks while Taborr questions his life choices. After the two groups work together to reconnect their carriages, Taborr's gang briefly turns on Kai but ultimately decide to let the Jedi transport the logs to the villages. Following their adventure, Kai and his friends reappraise their conflict with Taborr. Kai, Lys and Nubs accompany the Jedi explorer droid OG-LC on a mission to recover an ancient artifact known as the Story Stone of Tharnaka, which belongs to Tharnakan species who are presumed to be extinct. The Jedi and OG-LC encounter three thieves led by Ace Kallisto, who steal the Story Stone. Later, Ace reveals that she is working with the Tharnakan Ishbul Ekwesh and the Gungan Tooba Jinx to recover the Story Stone for Ishbul's people. However, Tooba steals the Story Stone, intending to sell it for money. Following a pursuit, OG-LC and the Jedi younglings are able to help the adults capture Tooba and recover the stone. OG-LC and the younglings gain the respect of Ishbul, who promises to tell of their deeds to the Tharnakan people.
13	13	"Tree Troubles"	Shellie Kvilvang-O'Brien	Brian Hall	August 2, 2023	September 8, 2023
13	13	"Big Brother's Bounty"	Casey Lowe	Julius Harper	August 2, 2023	September 8, 2023
Nubs discovers that his favorite Tenoo tree is unwell and that the ground is shaking. Together with Kai, Lys and Nash, he discovers that the Gozzo businessman Raxlo has been harvesting the giant tree's sap for profit. The harvester's powerful drill has been causing earthquakes and Raxlo has plugged the underground water with a boulder, causing an imbalance that threatens the tree. Following a rockfall, the younglings are able to convince Raxlo of the errors of his way. Working together, they join forces to unplug the boulder, allowing the water to flow freely again. During their escape attempt, Raxlo is forced to abandon his sap cargo so they can escape to the surface. Raxlo and the Jedi younglings depart on good terms but he keeps some sap for himself. While socialising at Hap's Sap Tap, the Jedi younglings encounter Senna Strang, the sister of their bounty hunter friend Ansen Strang. Senna is worried about the safety of her big brother, who has failed to answer her calls. She also struggles with self-doubt about being a bounty hunter. Together with the younglings, Senna learns that Weebo had hired Ansen to rescue a lost Burogwa, a burrowing animal used to aid with planting Weebo's crops. Kai, Lys and Nubs help Senna find Ansen. Working together, the Jedi and the bounty hunters successfully recapture the Burogwa. After returning the Burogwa to Weebo, Ansen thanks them for helping her to learn from her mistakes and capture her first successful bounty.
14	14	"Charhound Chase"	Anthony Bell	Cavan Scott	November 8, 2023	November 8, 2023
14	14	"Creature Comforts"	Shellie Kvilvang-O'Brien	Christian Streaty	November 8, 2023	November 8, 2023
Jedi Master Loden Greatstorm and Padawan Bell Zettifar visit the Tenoo Jedi Temple. While Master Zia takes Master Greatstorm, Lys and Nubs on a tour, Kai befriends Zettifar and the two spend time together practising with Force techniques including hurling. After Bell's pet charhound Ember gets lost in the forest, the two boys search for the dog together while honing their Force techniques.They find Ember but stumble onto the habitat of a Gangul. Working together, the two Jedi use the Force to levitate a large log in order to draw the Gangul away from Ember. The two then return for a lesson by Master Greatstorm. Lys Solay accompanies the safari droid Aree and CAM on a safari tour on a forested world. They encounter an uncatalogued reptilian hatchling, whom Lys christens Diggles. Unable to find Diggles' home and family, Lys proposes taking Diggles back to the Tenoo Jedi Temple. Aree disagrees, saying they should not take Diggles from his natural habitat. The droids and Lys are pursued by a large reptilian beast and flee with Diggs above Aree's starship. After realizing that the large reptile is Diggles' mother, they return Diggles to her and his siblings. Aree adds Diggles' species to the Galactic Creature Guide, giving them the name Mardorsh.
15	15	"An Adventure with Yoda"	Anthony Bell	Brian Hall	November 8, 2023	November 9, 2023
15	15	"The Talon Takeover"	Shellie Kvilvang-O'Brien	Maralisa Ortiz	November 8, 2023	November 9, 2023
Following a Jedi lesson with Master Yoda, the Jedi younglings join Nash and RJ-83 in coming to the aid of Zepher, who is being robbed by the Nihil pirates Jaay and Fleever. Against Yoda's orders, Nash interferes in the confrontation with the pirates, who escape on two stolen Jedi Vector starfighters with Zepher. With the guidance of Yoda and her friends, Nash pursues the Nihil through an asteroid field. Yoda uses the Force to open the pirate ship's rear hatch and recover the Vectors and Zepher. The Jedi and Nash help clean Zepher's store. Taborr and his gang are ambushed by the rival Ganguls, who steal their ship Iron Talon and kidnap Taborr. Despite Taborr's abusive treatment, EB-3 and Pord resolve to rescue their leader and seek the help of Kai, Lys, Nubs, and Nash. After tracking the Ganguls down to an abandoned outpost on Dedoon, EB-3 comes up with a plan that involves the Jedi younglings distracting the Ganguls while he and Pord rescue Taborr. The plan almost goes awry when they encounter the Ganguls' leader Sellaccc Orryak aboard the Talon. Working together, EB-3 and Pord free Taborrr and defeat Orryak. Taborr gains a better appreciation of his friends but tells the Jedi not to expect reciprocity.
16	16	"Mystery of the Opal Cave"	Casey Lowe	Christian Streaty	November 8, 2023	November 10, 2023
16	16	"Clash"	Anthony Bell	Katie Kaniewsky	November 8, 2023	November 10, 2023
The Jedi younglings go on a tour of Ootoo Prime's gem mines with miner Ayva Ackler. While investigating recent hauntings by a purported Shadow Beast in the Opal Cave, they discover that Taborr and his gang have staged the hauntings in order to steal Ootooan opal gems. While Kai and Lys confront Taborr, Nubs alerts Ayva and the other miners. The miners scare Taborr's gang away and reclaim the stolen gems. The younglings receive their own gems as a reward. During a lightsaber sparring class, Kai is paired with an ambitious Jedi initiate named Djovi Resmia, whom beats him in a sparring exercise. Kai is upset about losing the match. Concerned about potential rivalry between the two younglings, Master Zia tasks Kai and Djovi with retrieving a damaged beacon stone from the rope path bridge on a nearby Tenoo tree. Despite their initial hostility, the two younglings talk through their differences. Djovi beats Kai to obtaining the beacon stone but loses it when Kai pursues them. After the beacon stone falls into a chasm, the two younglings work together to retrieve it. Djovi confides that they struggle with insecurity about Kai's abilities while Kai reassures them that learning control is better than greatness.
17	17	"Stuck in the Muck"	Casey Lowe	Katie Kaniewsky	November 8, 2023	December 8, 2023
17	17	"Junkyard Sleepover"	Anthony Bell	Brian Hall	November 8, 2023	December 8, 2023
The Jedi younglings and Nash travel to Starlight Beacon for a guided tour. On the way, the group responds to a distress call by a group of reformed pirates led by Chigg. Following a misunderstanding, the group learn that the pirates have gotten their ship stuck in the mud while harvesting rare fruits on the planet Galjaero. During a rushed rescue, Brightstar and his friends cause the ship to slide down into the den of a tentacled creature. They make a second attempt and manage to use Nash's ship Crimsom Firehawk to retrieve the pirate ship with a tow cable. The younglings and reformed pirates then undergo a tour of Starlight Beacon with Jedi Master Esatala Maru. Marlaa is being haunted by a mysterious entity which she believes to be a Gloomling. The Jedi younglings and Nash have a sleepover with Marlaa and her droid JG-1 in order to catch the Gloomling. Following a series of scares, they come up with a plan to use bright lights to lure the Gloomling into a trap. They discover that the purported Gloomling is a damaged tracked droid, who was abandoned by its former owner. Marlaa adopts and repairs the droid, whom she names PT-3.
18	18	"The Great Leaf Glide"	Shellie Kvilvang-O'Brien	Julius Harper	November 8, 2023	November 17, 2023
18	18	"The Harvest Feast"	Casey Lowe	Rick Williams	November 8, 2023	November 17, 2023
Kai, Lys and Nubs accompany their fellow Jedi initiates to the planet Kondoraan for sky skimming lessons with the Nautolan Rix Tegano. During their lesson, Kai and his friends forget Rix's lessons about flying with the wind and attempt to follow a flock of flying fish known as chiffons. Flying against the wind, their sky skimming boards' wings are damaged. The trio travel through a desert back to Rix's platform but find their path blocked by a crater. After unsuccessfully trying to ride some chiffons, they use their cloaks to mend their boards' damaged wings. The younglings return in time for dinner. On the planet Omaka, the three Jedi younglings help the farmer Tey and his daughter Fiorna harvest some giant gomgourds for the Dunkutu Day festival. They encounter three of Grandpa Roog's malfunctioning droids, who accidentally drop two gomgouds. The Jedi manage to retrieve a gomgourd and learn about the falling out between Tey and Roog over the latter's use of droids for harvesting gomgourds. While returning the stray gomgourd, they hear Roog's side of the story. After rescuing one of Roog's droids, they join forces with Roog and Tey in deactivating the two other droids, who have gone rogue in the town. Tey and Roog reconcile with the former accepting that the droids do not violate Omakan tradition. They celebrate Dunkutu Day at Roog's farm.
19	19	"Life Day"	Anthony Bell	Katie Kaniewsky	November 8, 2023	December 1, 2023
19	19	"Raxlo Strikes Back"	Shellie Kvilvang-O'Brien	Brian Hall	November 8, 2023	December 1, 2023
Kai, Lys and Nubs accompany Master Zia and Yoda to attend a Life Day celebration on Kashyyyk. Lys befriends a local Wookiee named Johgeshakka ("Jo"), who is old enough to hang a Life Day Orb on the village's Life Tree. Lys accidentally causes Jo to drop her orb, which falls down the tree into the village market. Working together, Lys and her friends search for Jo's orb but it gets scratched in the process. Lys is guilt-ridden by her role in the accident but Jo is grateful to her friend. Though the Wookiee Chief Whitaggikk is unable to repair Jo's orb, they learn that the orbs remind everyone of the love they have for each other. The Jedi younglings travel to Andraven where they meet up with Gumar and Jam for the Wellagrin hatching season. While visiting the Wellagrin hatching grounds, they discover that Raxlo has been using his harvester to melt the snow in order to mine Tenga rocks, which prevents the Wellagrin eggs from hatching. Unwilling to listen to them, Raxlo unleashes his droids on the Jedi and Gumar. After subduing the droids, the younglings confront Raxlo, causing an avalanche to sweep away Raxlo's harvester. Following the confrontation, the younglings and Raxlo reach a compromise where Gumar shows Raxlo land where he can mine Tenga rocks without enroaching on the Wellagrins' habitat.
20	20	"Aftershock"	Casey Lowe	Katie Kaniewski	February 14, 2024	February 14, 2024
20	20	"Feather Frenzy"	Anthony Bell	Greg Iwinski	February 14, 2024	February 14, 2024
The Jedi younglings and Master Zia respond to an earthquake that has devastated a village on the planet Vuundalla. After meeting with villager Renaad and his daughter Mina, the Jedi attempt to convince the indulgent King Pychor and Queen Dafne to aid the villagers. The monarchs send their son Prince Cyrus to inspect the situation. Moved by the plight of his people, Cyrus steals building materials from the royal family's stables following a fight with security droids. When confronted by his parents, Cyrus convinces them to help the villagers. He also develops a friendship with Kai. The Jedi younglings come to the aid of Nash Durango and RJ-83, whose garage has been occupied by a flock of firehawk chicks. Durango is anxious because her mothers are bringing an important visitor and potential business partner Gripp Liskell. After several unsuccessful attempts to evict the birds including serving them berries, Lys comes up with the idea of disguising Nash's ship Crimson firehawk as an adult firehawk and using it to lure the chicks to the firehawk nesting froups at Griff's Landing. The plan works with the children earning the praise of Liskell and Nash's mothers.
21	21	"Best Friends"	Shellie Kvilvang-O'Brien	Brian Hall	February 14, 2024	February 16, 2024
21	21	"Happy Trails, Nubs"	Casey Lowe	Julius Harper	February 14, 2024	February 16, 2024
The Jedi younglings take part in a wilderness training exercise on Tenoo. Kai is paired with Nubs. Their journey quickly goes awry after their holomap is damaged and the two survive a crumbling suspension bridge. Following an argument, Kai and Nubs part ways. While Nubs safely reaches their rendezvous point, Kai is trapped in a tree by a pair of quadruped ganguls. Using teamwork, Nubs along with Lys and Djovi drive away the ganguls and rescue Kai. Kai and Nubs reconcile and complete the wilderness exercise before sundown. The Jedi younglings escort farmer Gab and his convoy on a trek to start up a new farm. After running out of seats, Nubs has to ride the last pod-wagon, which contains a well-maker drill. The convoy is ambushed by the Ganguls pirate gang, who steal the well-maker and capture Nubs. In captivity, pirate leader Sellaccc Orryak attempts to recruit Nubs by exploiting his feelings about being left out by his friends. After Kai and Lys reach the pirate hideout, Nubs helps his Jedi friends to recover the stolen well-maker and refurn it to the farmers. Nubs learns that he can tell his friends if he is feeling left out.
22	22	"The Tale of the Short Spire"	Casey Lowe	Julius Harper	February 14, 2024	February 23, 2024
22	22	"The Team Up"	Anthony Bell	Katie Kaniewski	February 14, 2024	February 23, 2024
The Jedi younglings travel to Batuu where they are guests of Jedi Master Carver Drow and his Padawan Celesta Kami. Drow sends Celesta and the younglings to obtain equipment for an expedition in Black Spire Outpost and to befriend the locals. They encounter the unscrupulous businessman Ozon Nimbee, who attempts to convince the locals to cut down the town's iconic spires as part of his real estate development project. Celesta exposes his true agenda to the Batuuns. Unable to win them over, Ozon sends his droids to chop down the town's spires. With the help of the Batuuns, the Jedi defeat Ozon's droids and send him packing. Taborr and his gang steal a crate of treasures from the archaeologist droid OG-LC, hoping to sell them off ar Yarrum Tower. However, the grownup Comet Runners pirate gang led by Corr Taldaan steals their ill-gotten crate. Taborr and his associates EB-3 and Pord reluctantly team up with Kai, Lys and Solay to recover the crate from the Comet Runners. Despite being trapped by the grownup pirates, the Jedi younglings encourage Taborr not to give up. Taborr comes up with an escape plan and the combined group succeeds in defeating the Comet Runners and recovering the crate. Kai and Solay ponder about Taborr's motives for his piracy.
23	23	"The Caves of Batuu"	Shellie Kvilvang-O'Brien	Katie Kaniewski	February 14, 2024	March 1, 2024
23	23	"Finders Keepers"	Casey Lowe	Mia Resella	February 14, 2024	March 1, 2024
The Jedi younglings visit Black Spire Outpost where they train under Master Drow and Padawan Celesta. While Kai successfully bests two training remotes during a public exhibition, he struggles to keep pace during a more complex lightsaber sequence. Kai is upset because he believes that he has to be perfect to be a great Jedi. Master Drow disagrees and takes Kai to a Force-strong cave to meditate on his feelings and ambitions. Kai encounters Bell Zettifar, Djovi Resmia, Taborr Val Dorn, and Master Yoda in a series of Force visions. Through these visions, Kai learns that Jedi do not need to strive for perfection to succeed. The Jedi younglings, Nash and RJ-83 spend time scavenging with Nash's friend Eren Kitt and her droid M1-M1 on the junk world of Bracca. While searching for scrap to salvage, M1-M1's power cell is damaged, causing the droid to lose power. The Jedi, Nash and Eren search for a power cell but a group of rodent-like PikPik scavengers get to it first. Following a chase, the two groups skirmish until Eren is able to convince the PikPik to give them one power cell needed to repair M1-M1. As a friendly gesture, Kitt agrees to a trade so that the PikPiks can obtain a circuit thruster for their damaged skiff. The PikPiks generously trade all their power cells for the circuit thruster. Kitt and her friends hope this trade would lead to more sharing and cooperation between the planet's scrappers.
24	24	"The Starship Show"	Anthony Bell	Julius Harper	February 14, 2024	March 8, 2024
24	24	"Nash's Super Busy Day"	Shellie Kvilvang-O'Brien	Brian Hall	February 14, 2024	March 8, 2024
During the Starship Show, Nash introduces her uncle Luggs Neelo to her Jedi friends. Luggs has acquired a rare XD-7 speedster. After the starship is stolen by conman Draiven Bosh and his droids, the Jedi younglings team up with Nash, RJ-83 and Luggs to recover the starship. Bosh takes the stolen ship to the Ugnaught Eunice Ino to remove its lock. Unwilling to fly the ship, Luggs proposes attaching a tow cable so that Nash's Crimson Firehawk can tow the speedster out of Eunice's garage. When the tow cable is broken during a confrontation with the thieves, Nash convinces Luggs to fly the ship out. As a reward, he allows his niece to fly the ship together. Kai helps a busy Nash to deliver supplies to her family's customers. While flying the Crimson Firehawk, he ignores her instructions to avoid joyriding and mixes up the deliveries. While racing to correct the situation, Kai crashes the Firehawk. With the help of Lys and Nubs, Nash and Kai repair the ship and redo the delivery run, giving their customers the right goods. They refurn to Nash's garage in time to clean it before Nash's mothers return.
25	25	"The Prince and the Pirate"	Anthony Bell, Casey Lowe & Shelie Kvilvang-O'Brien	Katie Kaniewski	February 14, 2024	March 15, 2024
Following a successful early morning combat exercise, the Jedi younglings catch a ride with Nash and RJ-83 to attend Starlight Beacon's dedication ceremony, which will be attended by Jedi and Republic dignitaries including Master Yoda and Chancellor Lina Soh. Meanwhile, it is revealed that Prince Cyrus Vuundiir is the pirate Taborr Val Dorn and plots to steal the dedication plaque. While EB-3 and Pord stage a diversion with the Iron Talon, Taborr steals the dedication plaque but is pursued by Kai, Lys and Nubs, who believe that he has kidnapped Cyrus. Following a lengthy pursuit through Starlight Beacon Taborr engages in a climatic lightsaber duel with Kai inside the station's reactor shaft. With the help of Lys and Nubs, they recover the dedication plaque. Taborr manages to convince the younglings to release him in exchange for the safe return of Cyrus. Having gained a better appreciation of his Jedi friends, Cyrus later joins the young Jedi at the dedication ceremony.

=== Season 2 (2024–25) ===
No. overall	No. in season	Title	Directed by	Written by	Disney+ release date	Disney Jr. air date
26	1	"Heroes and Hotshots"	Anthony Bell	Katie Kaniewski	August 14, 2024	August 14, 2024
26	1	"A Jedi or a Pirate"	Shelie Kvilvang-O'Brien	Julius Harper	August 14, 2024	August 14, 2024
Master Zia introduces the younglings Kai, Lys and Nubs to her new Padawan Wes Vinik and his astromech droid R0-M1 ("Romi"). Zia dispatches Vinik and the younglings on a mission to the starship-producing planet Deppani, which has been hit by a storm. Catching a ride aboard Nash's Crimson Firehawk, the group travel to Deppani where they discover that the Ganguls pirate gang have taken advantage of the storm to steal ships. An over-confident Vinik learns to accept the help of the younglings and Nash. Working together, the group defeat the Ganguls and return their stolen starships to the locals. Kai, Lys and Nubs introduce a group of new Jedi younglings to Hap's Sap Tap. The homesick youngling Bren accidentally stows aboard a starship bound for the pirate haven of Yarrum Tower. Borrowing the Crimson Firehawk, Kai travels to Yarrum but accidentally damages the ship's stabilizer coil. Kai discovers that Bren has befriended the Pantoran pirate Clave Rollek, who attempts to recruit Bren as a pirate. After Clave steals a stabilizer coil from the Twi'lek vendor Hudi, the two younglings join forces to recover the stolen object from Rollek, who flees. Out of gratitude, Hudi lets the younglings keep the stabilizer coil for their damaged Firehawk. Back on Tenoo, Bren recounts his adventure on Yarrum to his peers.
27	2	"The Rustler Roundup"	Anthony Bell	Greg Iwinski	August 14, 2024	August 15, 2024
27	2	"A New Discovery"	Casey Lowe	Brian Hall	August 14, 2024	August 15, 2024
Kai and Padawan Bell Zettifar travel to a desert planet to help Mayor Brooks deal with the theft of his town's nerf herd by rustlers. The two Jedi recover the stolen herd from the rustlers at night. During a confrontation between the townsfolk and the rustlers, Kai and Bell discover that the townsfolk had wronged the ancestors of the rustlers by not upholding their promise to share part of the herd. After the rustlers save the herd from falling off a cliff, Mayor Brooks decides to make amends with the rustlers by giving part of the nerf herd to them. Lys and another Jedi youngling named Myra undertake a mission on behalf of Aree to catalogue the elusive rodent-like Leepur for the Galactic Society of Creature Enthusiasts. While searching the Tenoo forest, they encounter the Leepur and venture down a sinkhole to find the creature. The two girls are trapped by find a passageway that leads back to the surface. While navigating through the passageway, they rescue the Leepur, which befriends them and follows them back to the Tenoo Jedi Temple. Having completed their mission, Aree assigns Lys and Myra on a new mission to catalogue the Federian erbling.
28	3	"A Pirate's Pet"	Shelie Kvilvang-O'Brien	Christian Streaty	August 14, 2024	August 16, 2024
28	3	"The Secret Ship"	Casey Lowe	Greg Iwinski	August 14, 2024	August 16, 2024
Seeking to impress the other pirates at Yarrum Tower, Taborr and his gang capture a wild gangul beast on the planet Tenoo. The startled gangul goes on a rampage in Kublop Springs but Taborr is able to trap the creature aboard his starship Iron Talon. Kai, Lys and Nubs pursue Taborr to Yarrum Tower, seeking to bring the beast back to its natural habitat. Following a skirmish, the gangul panics and flees into the nearby desert. The younglings convince Taborr to let them return the exhausted gangul to Tenoo. Based on Taborr's experiences, Kai learns that he doesn't have to impress other people. The mechanically-minded Princess Inaya takes her friend Nash, RJ-83 and the reluctant butler droid PD-4 on a test flight aboard her secret starship. While flying on a canyon-covered world, the ship's ion compressor breaks down. While obtaining spareparts from a Toong merchant, they discover that a Nautolan tow ship pilot has impounded their starship. While the droids unlock the magclamp, Inaya and Nash attempt to repair the ion compressor but find it is more difficult than expected. After Inaya's ship falls off the tow ship, Inaya manages to repair the ion compressor with the help of PD-4. Returning to her homeworld, Inaya tells her parents about her mechanical interests, which impresses them and PD-4. They then officiate over a library opening ceremony.
29	4	"Nubs' Big Mistake"	Shelie Kvilvang-O'Brien	Story by : James Eason-Garcia; Teleplay by : Brian Hall	August 14, 2024	August 23, 2024
29	4	"The Jedi Rescue"	Anthony Bell	Julius Harper	August 14, 2024	August 23, 2024
During a field trip to an ancient Jedi Temple, Nubs along with Kai and Lys discover a mural dedicated to a renowned Pooban Jedi Master named Barabo. Nubs takes an interest in his lightsaber, which Yoda recognizes as a relic to be added to the Jedi Archives on Coruscant. Nubs accompanies Yoda, Nash and RJ-83 on the Crimson Firehawk to Coruscant. Nubs is enamored by Barabo's lightsaber and is distracted during the flight, causing the Firehawk to get caught in a comet and to crashland on a nearby world. Their predicament is complicated by the loss of the Firehawk's stabilizer and Barabo's lightsaber to a carnivorous plant. With the encouragement of Yoda, Nubs comes up with a successful plan to extricate the two objects from the carnivorous plant. On Coruscant, the architect droid Huyang repairs Barabo's lightsaber. Padawan Wes Vinik accompanies the Jedi younglings to Yarrum Tower to fetch supplies. Wes stumbles upon a Ganguls recruitment meeting and learns of their leader Sellaccc's plot to steal starships from the Variax shipyard. However, Wes is captured by the Gangul gang. Kai, Lys and Nubs follow Vinik aboard the Ganguls' flagship Rathtar's Revenge but are also captured. They are freed by the reformed pirate Chigg, who had pretended to join the Ganguls. With the help of Nash, the younglings stage a skirmish against the Ganguls and their recruits. Chigg saves Wes and gains his trust. The Jedi escape the pirates, who are forced to retreat. Wes befriends Chigg following their adventure Variax.
30	5	"Terror of Tenoo"	Casey Lowe	James Eason-Garcia	August 14, 2024	August 30, 2024
30	5	"The Prince of Masks"	Anthony Bell	Katie Kaniewski	August 14, 2024	August 30, 2024
While returning to Tenoo the Jedi younglings, Nash and RJ-83 discover a derelict pirate cruiser on an asteroid known as the Terror of Tenoo, the starship of the infamous pirate Captain Blackbolt. While exploring the ship, they accidentally reactivate Blackbolt, who is revealed to be an armored droid. They also discover Blackbolt's stolen treasure including Kaliah Kublop's staff. Following a skirmish, they manage to escape Blackbolt by causing the Terror to jump into hyperspace. The younglings manage to detach the Firehawk from the pirate ship before the jump. RJ-83 also retrieves the stolen staff. Nash is welcomed back as a hero by the residents of Kublop Springs. The Jedi younglings visit their friend Prince Cyrus Vuundir, unaware of his pirate alter ego Taborr. While visiting the local villagers, the Comet Runners pirate gang led by Corr Taldaan raids the village and steals their fathier herd. The Jedi and Cyrus pursue the Comet Runners but the former are captured while the latter is separated after his speeder crashes into a tree. Embracing his alter ego identity, Taborr enlists the help of his associates EB-3 and Pord in rescuing the fathiers and the Jedi younglings. Following a duel, Taborr forces Corr to release the fathiers and to leave his homeworld of Vuundalla. Cyrus later rejoins the Jedi and villagers, who are still unaware of his alter ego.
31	6	"Battle for the Band"	Shelie Kvilvang-O'Brien	Brian Hall	August 14, 2024	September 6, 2024
31	6	"Uprooted"	Casey Lowe	Christian Streaty	August 14, 2024	September 6, 2024
The Ganguls gang kidnap Feb Rozo and the Sap Tap Trio in order to trade them for security droids with the Hutt crime lord Bulcha. Hap joins Kai, Lys, Nubs, Wes, Nash and RJ-83 on a mission to rescue the band on Yarrum. While Nash and RJ stay aboard the Crimson Firehawk as get-away pilots, the Jedi younglings infiltrate Bulcha's sail barge but get captured. Hap manages to disguise him as a bartender and frees his friends. Following a skirmish with Bulcha's minions, the Jedi and Hap manage to rescue the band and escape back to Tenoo. Kai, Nubs and Jedi youngling Linh seek out the rare barellia flower, which is expected to bloom at night. Traveling to its spot in Tenoo's forest, they discover that the flower has been uprooted by droids serving the elderly woman Prue Canti, who owns a nearby greenhouse. Prue believes that she is protecting the flower and resist the Jedi younglings' efforts to rescue it. While Kai and Nubs fight with her droids, Linh manages to retrieve the plant. Linh and her friends manage to convince Prue to replant the flower in its original spot. Together, the group watch as the flower blooms and releases a new seed.
32	7	"Mine and Ours"	Anthony Bell	Katie Kaniewski	August 14, 2024	September 13, 2024
32	7	"The Andraven Circuit"	Shellie Kvilvang-O'Brien	Christian Streaty	August 14, 2024	September 13, 2024
Kai, Nubs, Lys, Inaya and Cyrus attend a celebration organised by the Ootoan miners of Ootoo Prime to marke a new mining discovery. During a tour of the mines, Cyrus steals a yellow gemstone but disturbs a swarm of armored amberflies, who devour gems and terrorize the guests and miners. Working together, the younglings help the miner Ayva Ackler to use a giant gemstone to lure the insects back to their nest and seal the cave. Cryus sacrifices his gemstone and brooch in the process. Besides learning a lesson, Cyrus and Inaya develop affections for each other. The three Jedi younglings accompany their Andraven friend Gumar on a rite of passage known as the Andraven Ancestors Circuit. The circuit involves riding a sled drawn by three seal-like wellagrin and obtaining three objects: heat stones, snowfigs and a kao reed flute. Though Gumar accomplishes the first two with the help of his Jedi friends, the group are pursued by a legendary Zaba wolf. Before the wolf can hurt Nubs, Gumar fashions a flute out of kao reed and tames the wolf. Gumar completes the quest, impressing his father and the organiser by taming a Zaba wolf.
33	8	"The Great Gomgourd Quest"	Casey Lowe	Cavan Scott	August 14, 2024	September 20, 2024
33	8	"A Sticky Situation"	Anthony Bell	Greg Iwinski	August 14, 2024	September 20, 2024
The Jedi younglings introduce Padawan Wes Vinik to their Omakan friends Roog, Tey and Fiorna during the Dunkutu Day festival on Omaka. Since the harvest for gomgourds has been poor, Fiorna and her droid HM-7 have harvested several wild gomgourds. However, a flock of large kroop birds attack the village and take the gomgourds. Later, Fiorna convinces Nubs to help her and HM-7 recover more wild gomgourds from a patch near the kroop birds' nest. However, this angers the birds who confront the intruders. Nubs manages to defuse the situation by serving the kroop birds gomgourd pieces. Realizing that the gomgourds belonged to the birds, the younglings and their hosts decide to make do without gomgourds for this year's Dunkutu Day festival. Kai is jubilant are capturing a snap-rat that has been frightening the other younglings. Lys invites Aree to collect the snap-rat for rehousing. While the younglings are touring Aree's freighter, Kai accidentally releases several crystal web spiders and a giant Spider-King, which rampage through the Tenoo Jedi Temple. Kai is overwhelmed by his arachnophobia. Though the Jedi and Aree manage to recapture the smaller spiders, they discover that the Spider-King is still on the loose. After his friends and Aree are stuck in the Spider-King's web, Kai overcomes his fear and manages to lure the Spider-King back aboard the Aree's freighter.
34	9	"The Missing Life Day Feast"	Shellie Kvilvang-O'Brien	Brian Hall	August 14, 2024	December 6, 2024
34	9	"The Lost Treasure of Tenoo"	Casey Lowe	Katie Kaniewski	August 14, 2024	December 6, 2024
The reluctant Trandoshan Daynaal accompanies his pirate aunt Sellaccc Orryak and her Ganguls gang to the Wookiee homeworld of Kashyyyk. Orryak plans to ruin the Wookiee's Life Day holiday by disrupting a food shipment and cutting down a Life Day tree. After they shoot down a Wookiee ship carrying supplies and capture its pilot Rudi, the Jedi younglings and their Wookiee friend Johgeshakka attempt to rescue Rudi but are captured by the Ganguls. Questioning his aunt's piratical ways and seeing the bond between Rudi and his sister Joh, Daynaal frees the Jedi and Wookiees. He brings Wookiee reinforcements who drive away the Ganguls. Despite being a Trandoshan and Sellaccc's nephew, Daynaal is welcomed by the Wookiees and Jedi as a friend. While sorting through artifacts, Kai and fellow Jedi youngling Djovi Resmia discover the coordinates Tenoo's founder Kaliah Kublop and Jedi Master Staas Ragnabi's secret treasure storehouse Tanglevine Base, which is hidden behind a waterfall. However, Captain Blackbolt and his droid minions arrive to claim Tanglevine Base's treasures and artifacts. Djovi is affected by their fear of snakes, causing them to lose the first skirmish. After Djovi confides in Kai about their fear, Kai encourages his friend to overcome their fear. Working together, they expel Blackbolt and his minions from Tanglevine Base.
35	10	"The Wild Aklyrr"	Anthony Bell	Christian Streaty	August 14, 2024	September 27, 2024
35	10	"Lys' Lost Lightsaber"	Shellie Kvilvang-O'Brien	Julius Harper	August 14, 2024	September 27, 2024
Kai, Lys and Nubs reluctantly agree to help their bounty hunter friend Anseng Strung capture an antelope-like blue aklyrr for a mysterious wealthy client in order to repair his damaged starship. Working together, the four manage to trap the aklyrr. The client turns out to be the unscrupulous businessman Draiven Bosh, who likes collecting rare things. When Strung changes his mind, Bosh seizes the aklyrr without paying Anse. Ansen and the Jedi join forces to rescue the aklyrr and defeat Bosh and his droid minions. Out of respect, the residents of Aklyrr's Bend repair Ansen's ship for free. While visiting Batuu Outpost, the Jedi younglings take part in a lightsaber demo with Master Carver Drow and his Padawan Celesta Kami. A local girl name Sadie Bolter steals Lys' lightsaber in order to stand up to the local bully Pak Relda. However, Pak steals Lys' lightsaber from Sadie. Sadie confesses to Lys and Celesta and helps them find Pak. Pak refuses to give up the lightsaber and unleashes her spider droids on the Jedi. Sadie aids the Jedi against Pak and defeats the bully with her wooden lightsaber. Sadie learns that one does not need a lightsaber to be brave.
36	11	"Tower Run"	Casey Lowe	Katie Kaniewski	August 14, 2024	October 6, 2024
36	11	"The Jumping Jetpack"	Anthony Bell	Greg Iwinski	August 14, 2024	October 6, 2024
While the Jedi younglings enjoy berries at the former pirate Chigg's fruit stall, Yarrum Tower is taken over by the expanded Ganguls gang led by Sellaccc. As the Ganguls force the other pirates and merchants into their gang, the younglings promise to help Chigg escape. They convince a reluctant Taborr to work together to sneak out of the tower to reach Taborr's starship Iron Talon in the nearby airfield. At the airfield, Taborr attacks Sellaccc, leading to a skirmish with her and her lieutenants Jooro Jarrot and Toda-Joh. Taboor escapes the pirates but returns aboard the Iron Talon to strafe the Ganguls and rescue the Jedi and Chigg. Despite helping the Jedi and Chigg, Taborr insists he did it out of his own choice. Chigg sets up a new stall in Kublop Springs. While visiting Marlaa's junkyard to obtain an actuator for his friend Nash, Kai helps Marlaa and the explorer Maz Kanata to recover the latter's runaway jetpack. After unsuccessfully using his Force powers to trap the jetpack, Kai joins Marlaa and Maz in search Tenoo's forest for the missing jetpack. Along the way, he learns more about Marlaa's adventurous past. After Maz Kanata gets stuck in a pool of sap, Kai unsuccessfully attempts to free her using the Force. Marlaa convinces Kai to use his Force powers to levitate the jetpack towards her. After Marlaa repairs the jetpack, she rescues Maz from the sap pool. Maz subsequently returns to her castle while Kai listens to Marlaa telling a story while searching for an actuator.
37	12	"Unmasked"	Anthony Bell and Shellie Kvilvang-O'Brien	Katie Kaniewski	March 19, 2025	March 23, 2025
Seeking to curry favor with the Ganguls, the Comet Runners gang proposes that they rob the Vuundir family's royal palace and steal their crown jewels. Prior to the raid, Prince Cyrus is practising combat moves with Kai when the pirates interrupt with an attack on the royal palace and a nearby village. While Lys, Nubs, Nash and RJ-83 defend the village, Kai and Cyrus join forces to stop the Ganguls from plundering the safe. In the process, Kai learns about Cyrus's secret alter ego as the pirate Taborr. This interferes with their attempt to stop the Ganguls from stealing the Vuundir crown jewels. Brightstar confronts Cyrus for not being truthful and attempts to convince him to choose friendship over piracy. Angered, Cyrus travels to Yarrum Tower to reclaim his family's crown jewels. At the urging of Lys, the younglings come to Cyrus' aid and help him fight off the pirates. However, Cyrus chooses to embrace his Taborr pirate persona and escapes alone. A distraught Kai is comforted by Master Zia, who tells him and the other younglings that they have to let people live with their choices.
38	13	"Just Like Wes"	Casey Lowe	Christian Streaty	March 19, 2025	March 23, 2025
38	13	"Raxlo to the Rescue"	Anthony Bell	Julius Harper	March 19, 2025	March 23, 2025
Seeking to help Padawan Wes Vinik, the three Jedi younglings take a box of coaxium to Zepher on the moon of Denoon. On the way, their Jedi Vector starfighters are pursued by the Comet Runners but they manage to lose them in an asteroid field. The Comet Runners raid Zepher's garage and steal the coaxium following a fight. Working together Kai, Lys and Nubs manage to recover the coaxium from the Comet Runners and escape their starship. Kai learns that he does not need to mimic Wes but can be himself. Returning to Andraveen, the Jedi younglings reunite with Raxlo, local children Gumar and Jam, and the seal-like Wellagrins. Raxlo has used his harvester to mine tenga rocks, becoming a hero to the locals. However, the Ganguls disarm the Jedi younglings, Raxlo, his security droids and steal the harvester. The four pursue the pirates inside the cave where Raxlo manages to disable its mining wheel. With the help Gumar, Jam, Raxlo's servant droid RC-99, and the Wellagrins drive the Ganguls away using a snow fight.
39	14	"The Helpful Harvester"	Shellie Kvilvang-O'Brien	Brian Hall	March 19, 2025	March 30, 2025
39	14	"Lost Little Droid"	Casey Lowe	Joe Morgan	March 19, 2025	March 30, 2025
While helping local villager Locc and his son Jor harvest lumo cave mushrooms on Tenoo, Nubs and the locals are trapped inside a cave by a fallen giant Tenoo tree. With the villagers unable to drill through the giant tree, Kai and Lys convince a reluctant Raxlo to help rescue their friends. Raxlo uses his harvester to drill underground and reach the trio. However, the harvester is damaged and trapped by a large rockfall. Discovering an underground river, Raxlo convinces the Jedi younglings and villagers to build an improvised raft, which they use to escape the cave. Out of gratitude, the villagers agree to build him a new harvester. Kai, Lys, Nubs, Wes and R0-M1 deliver a sparepart for Braygh's water scout droid B3-C4 on the desert world of Kundu Minor. However, the skittish droid flees into the desert during a sandstorm and is taken by two Dostan aliens. Kai, Wes and R0-M1 accompany Braygh on a mission to rescue her droid. With the help of Wes' Huttese language skills, they determine that the Dostans are not thieves but rescued B3-C4. The skittish droid flees inside a cave inhabited by tentacled Dendrok creatures. Working together, the Jedi, Brayh and the Dostans rescue B3-C4 while escaping the ravenous Dendroks. Braygh comes to respect the Dendroks and agrees to get the Jedi to secure parts to build another water scout.
40	15	"Tenoo's Fastest"	Shellie Kvilvang-O'Brien	Greg Iwinski	March 19, 2025	March 30, 2025
40	15	"Home Sweet Temple"	Casey Lowe	James Eason-Garcia	March 19, 2025	March 30, 2025
Nash takes her Jedi friends to meet her favourite monopod racer Wiston Freng, who is taking part in the Tenoo Grand Tour race. However, the rival Dug podracer Jaj Omie attempts to sabotage Wiston by disabling his engineer droid JK-46. With JK-46 missing, Wiston convinces a reluctant Nash to serve as his engineer. Despite Jaj's dirty tricks, Nash, RJ-83 and her Jedi friends help refuel and repair the Wiston's monopod throughout the three-leg race. Nash also overcomes her self doubt and inexperience. During the final leg, Nash pilots the monopod while Fiston repairs the stabilizer fin, defeating Jaj and the other racers. Nash and Wiston share the prize. After accidentally toppling a bookcase, Kai stays behind with the caretaker droid Dee to clean up the mess. While Master Zia and the other Jedi depart on a field trip, the thief Ace Kallisto and her droid JNX-09 (Jinx) come to the Tenoo Jedi Temple, seeking refuge from Bulcha the Hutt. Bulcha had stolen Jinx for its codebreaking skills and Ace had incurred his wrath by stealing him back. Bulcha and his droids lay siege to the Jedi Temple, causing significant damage. Kai and Dee join forces with Ace and Jinx to defend the Temple. Following a skirmish, the team work together to trap Bulcha under two bookcases. Master Zia and the other Jedi return and expel Bulcha, who vows revenge. While Kai is upset that about the damage to their home occurring under his watch, Ace and Zia reassure him that the safety of the occupants is more important.
41	16	"The Firehawk Feud"	Anthony Bell	James Eason-Garcia and Charley Feldman	March 19, 2025	April 6, 2025
41	16	"The Chop Shop Calamity"	Shellie Kvilvang-O'Brien	Christian Streaty	March 19, 2025	April 6, 2025
Kai, Lys and Nubs helps K-2PL to find her master Draiven Bosh, who has gotten lost in the forests of Tenoo. They discover Draiven attempting to capture a Firehawk hatchling. When the mother Firehawk hangs Bosh on a branch, Lys is reluctant to assist the unscrupulous collector but Kai and Nubs convince her that the Jedi way is to help those in need. With the help of the Firehawk hatchling, Lys rescues Draiven and extracts a promise from him not to collect any Firehawks. Jedi Padawan Wes Vinik lends the services of his droid R0-M1 (Romi) to Nash and her team. While attempting to install an accelerator inside the Crimson Firehawk, Romi accidentally damages the device. They seek the help of Marlaa Jinara in repairing the accelerator but it gets stolen by the Ugnaught Eunice Ino. Romi joins Nash, RJ-83, Nubs and PT-3 in recovering the stolen accelerator from Ino's chop shop. Not understanding teamwork, Romi gets the group captured. After reconciling with Nash and the others, the group work as a team to escape their energy-field prison, distract Eunice and her reptilian massiffs and recover the accelerator. Learning the importance of team work, Romi retrieves the accelerator and helps install it into Nash's ship.
42	17	"Big Pooba Problems"	Anthony Bell	Brian Hall	March 19, 2025	April 13, 2025
42	17	"Best Bounty Buddies"	Casey Lowe	Maralis Ortiz	March 19, 2025	April 13, 2025
While searching for a waalax tree in Tenoo's wilderness, Nubs and Lys come to the aid of the droid NP-87 and the adult Pooba Zeephoz, whose cargo starship has crashed. On a tight deadline to deliver supplies to a merchant in Kublop Springs, the Jedi younglings help the two adults transport a cargo pod. Nubs looks up to the adult Zeephoz, wishing he was a grownup. After encountering some gangul beasts, they travel through a canyon. Following a rockfall, they work together to use an improvised crane to lift the cargo pod. On the outskirts, the cargo pod slides down a hill and is damaged. Nubs is despondent but Lys encourages him not to give up. Using waalax tree leaves as improvised sleds, the group manage to deliver the cargo pot to a merchant. The younglings earn the praise of NP-87 and Zeephoz. Kai, Lys and Nubs help the bounty hunter Ansen Strung recapture a pet rodent-like Faloen hopper. Rhugo Tar, one of Strung's former bounty hunter associates, invites him on a mission to capture the starship thief Sty Trune. Rhugo thinks that Ansen has gone soft tracking creatures. Seeking to prove Rhugo wrong, Ansen accepts the mission, with the Jedi younglings tagging along. Though they corner Sty on the planet Aludia, the starship thief escapes twice due to Ansen and Rhugo's bickering about whose methods work best. At the urging of the younglings, the two adults put aside their differences and stop Sty from escaping on Ansen's starship. With their friendship renewed, the two bounty hunters invite each other to participate in future missions.
43	18	"The Rainy Day Beast"	Shellie Kvilvang-O'Brien	Christian Streaty	March 19, 2025	April 20, 2025
43	18	"Upgraded"	Casey Lowe	Julius Harper and Kate Kaniewski	March 19, 2025	April 20, 2025
With a planned outing canceled due to wet weather, Lys convinces Kai and Nubs to accompany her on an adventure to find the legendary Guardian of the Tenoo Temple, a Tazi sloth who resides in a giant tree at the top of the Tenoo Jedi Temple. The three Jedi younglings climb up the tree and stumble upon the Guardian's nest, disturbing the creature. The enraged sloth pursues the younglings. While Lys distracts the creature, Kai and Nubs repair the damaged roof of the nest. After the younglings save the creature from falling, the sloth reconciles with them and returns to its centuries-long slumber. The younglings later recount their adventure to Master Zia, who recounts her own encounter with the Guardian. The Jedi younglings, Padawan Wes Vinik and R0-M1 investigate a spate of thefts from the Deppani starship factory. While on patrol, Kai encounters the thief Prince Cyrus, who has embraced his Taborr pirate persona. Following a duel, Taborr is captured by the Jedi. While alone, Taborr manages to sweet-talk Kai long enough for him to unlock his handcuffs. After locking Kai in the office, Taborr steals a thrust accelerator and rejoins his associates Pord and EB-3 at their starship Iron Talon. Kai catches up with Taborr and reclaims the accelerator following a duel. Accepting that his friend has chosen evil over good, Kai allows Taborr to leave. Later, Kai discusses his feelings about Taborr with Wes, who reassures him that it is good to hope for people to be better.
44	19	"Journey to the Bracca Badlands"	Shellie Kvilvang-O'Brien	Story by : Greg Iwinski; Written by : Katie Mattila	March 19, 2025	April 27, 2025
44	19	"The Search for the Missing Dunnels"	Anthony Bell	Brian Hall	March 19, 2025	April 27, 2025
The Jedi younglings travel to the planet Bracca to meet up with their scavenger friend Eren Kitt and her droid M1-M1. Eren is worried because her Pikpik friends including Tippo have not returned from a salvaging mission. After escaping a family of dianoga, they discover that the Nihil pirates Fleever and Jaay have captured the Pikpiks and forced them to salvage a starship for parts to aid Nihil raids. Following a brief skirmish, the Nihil escape with several of their captives after a dianoga attacks. The Jedi and Eren track the Nihil to their starship. While the Jedi battle with the Nihil's droids, Tippo and Eren free the other Pikpiks. The Jedi manage to rescue everyone by attracting a dianoga. The group celebrate over some starship parts that the Jedi younglings have brought from Marlaa's junkyard on Tenoo. Lys gives her Rodian Jedi youngling friend Zotti riding lessons with a dunnel. While tending to the dunnels at their stables, Zotti fails to secure the locks, causing three dunnels to escape. Lys and Zotti find that the three dunnels have been taken by the bandits Emmett, Chipp and Z-3OR, who intend to use the mammals to board a train they plan to rob. The Jedi pursue the bandits on top of a train. While Lys fights the bandits, Zotti manages to use her Force powers to calm the creatures and convince them to listen to her. The Jedi and their dunnel steeds escape the train before it hits a tunnel. The bandits survive and Emett vows revenge. After securing the three runaway dunnels, Lys gives Zotti another riding lesson.
45	20	"The Spaceport Setback"	Casey Lowe	Christian Streaty	March 19, 2025	May 2, 2025
45	20	"The Mission Mixup"	Anthony Bell	Sarah Nerboso	March 19, 2025	May 2, 2025
At the insistence of Lys, the Jedi younglings visit Kublop Springs' spaceport during a holiday. While attempting to help the labor droid F-4RO load a crate, they accidentally send it to the pirate stronghold of Yarrum Tower. Nash gives the Jedi younglings a ride in her starship Crimson Firehawk to Yarrum. The Jedi find the crate but are captured by the Ganguls, who have claimed it. Working together, the younglings free themselves and fight the Ganguls. Nash and RJ-83 pick up the crate and evacuate the Jedi. After returning the crate, they spend the day reading books. Master Zia sends Kai, Lys, Nubs and Nash on two separate missions to rescue three lost bantha cubs and retrieve Jedi explorer Seba's journal. However she decides to test the Jedi younglings by switching their coordinates. Kai and Nubs are sent to retrieve the banthas. Despite difficulties, they work together and use Lys and Nash's skills to round up the bantha cubs and repair a damaged speeder. Similarly, Lys and Nash improvise and manage to find Seba's journal after digging several holes at the jungle outpost. Returning to Tenoo, Zia admits mixing up the coordinates in order to test their ability to learn from each other and respond to the unexpected.
46	21	"Yoda Rescue"	Shellie Kvilvang-O'Brien	Cavan Scott	March 19, 2025	May 9, 2025
46	21	"Fossil Hunt"	Casey Lowe	Christian Streaty	March 19, 2025	May 9, 2025
While on a mission to record purrgil songs in space, the Jedi younglings, Nash and RJ-83 receive a distress signal from Yoda, whose ship has crash-landed on the dangerous, volcanic world of Vrant Tarnum. (Note: Yoda crashing his ship on Vrant Tarnum was depicted on the ongoing comic series The High Republic Adventures (2021)) Kai, Lys and Nubs find Yoda but he has sustained a broken leg. Nash's ship Crimson Firehawk is attacked by several lava beetles, which damage the ship's thruster relay. Working together, the younglings drive the beetles away while Yoda and Kai use the Force to hold back a lava flow. Following their escape, the younglings and Yoda watch and listen to a pod of purrgil. The Jedi younglings accompany the explorer droid OG-LC to a dig site on Tenoo that is home to the fossils of several extinct prehistoric animals including a giant raka lizard. While Solay and Nubs are interested, Kai is bored. The archaeological dig is interrupted by the unscrupulous entrepreneur Ozon Nimbee, who plans to build a tourist resort on the site. He ignores the younglings and OG-LC's attempts to warn him of the site's historical importance. Nimbee traps the four in a pit and attempts to flatten the dig site with his droids and bulldozer. The Jedi and OG-LC escape the pit and join forces to stop Nimbee, causing his bulldozer to fall into a pit. Following Nimbee's defeat, the Jedi younglings repurpose his droids to restoring the site while helping OG-LC uncover more fossils.
47	22	"A Mission to Remember"	Anthony Bell	Brian Hall	March 19, 2025	May 16, 2025
47	22	"The Bounty Hunter and the Thief"	Shellie Kvilvang-O'Brien	Julius Harper	March 19, 2025	May 16, 2025
Kai, Lys and Nubs help the damaged droid MB-1, who is being pursued by the bandit Emmett and his gang. Emmett wants MB-1, who has information on valuable gem mines on Tenoo. After fleeing into the Tenoo tree forest, the Jedi younglings attempt to reunite MB-1 with his master but the droid has trouble remembering his master due to his damaged memory circuit. All he can remember is that his master lives near a giant Tenoo tree with waterfalls. Emmett and his gang catch up with the younglings, bind them and recapture MB-1. After breaking free of their ropes, the Jedi team up to defeat the bandits and return MB-1 to his master, the prospector Freet Chaddio. Chaddio gives them a tour of one of his gem mines. After teaming up with the former bounty hunter Anseng Strung to rescue a tooka cat, the Jedi younglings and Strung meet with Ace Kallisto, who seeks Lys's advice on transporting a rare squort lizard. As a thief, Ace is initially cold towards Strung due to his previous occupation. However, the Gungan thief Tooba Jinx steals the squort, intending to make money from selling it. The Jedi younglings and the adults pursue Tooba through the forest and down a waterfall but the mission is complicated by bickering between Ace and Ansen. Putting aside their differences, the adults team up with the younglings to pursue Tooba and reclaim the stolen squort. Tooba retreats in defeat while Ace and Ansen develop a better appreciation of each other's skills and abilities.
48	23	"The Battle of Tenoo"	Anthony Bell, Shellie Kvilvang-O'Brien & Casey Lowe	Katie Kaniewski	March 19, 2025	May 23, 2025
Seeking to drive the Jedi from their sector, Sellaccc Orryak assembles her pirate allies including the Comet Runners and Captain Blackbolt for a combined assault against the Tenoo Jedi Temple. The Jedi younglings, Nash, RJ-83, Wes Vinik, and R0-M1 are forced to abandon the temple and retreat to Tanglevine Base. With the Ganguls blocking offworld transmissions, Kai uses an old comm station to send an offworld distress signal. Though the Jedi, Nash and RJ-83 are captured by the pirates, several allies including Padawan Celeste Kami, Raxlo, Ace Kalisto, Jinx, Princess Inaya, Nash's mothers Ceeli and Kryys, Taborr, EB-3 and Pord come to their aid. The Jedi manage to drive the Ganguls and their pirate vassals from the Tenoo temple but Orryak orders the Rathtar's Revenge to use its claws to tear down the temple. Before the pirate flagship can complete its mission, the vessel is shot down through the combine efforts of Taborr's crew and Vinik. Masters Zia and Carver Drow arrive and arrest the Ganguls and the remaining pirates. Following the battle Kai, Lys and Nubs make peace with Taborr, who still has ambitions of being a pirate. Together with Nash, the Jedi younglings vow to face any threats including pirates and thieves.

=== Season 3 (2025) ===
No. overall	No. in season	Title	Directed by	Written by	Disney+ release date	Disney Junior air date
49	1	"The New Droid Friends"	Shellie Kvilvang-O'Brien	Katie Kaniewski	December 8, 2025	December 8, 2025
49	1	"Batuu Bonanza"	Casey Lowe	Christian Streaty	December 8, 2025	December 8, 2025
The Jedi younglings Kai, Lys and Nubs learn about looking after droids from Dotti, who runs a droid workshop in Kublop Springs. Before Dotti can install a vocabulator in a droid patient named JN-47, two spider droids working for a young droidsmith named Rek Minuu steal the sparepart, hoping to repair one of his droids, Beepers. Pursuing the spider droids, the Jedi younglings encounter two astromech droids named Dozer and Gigi, who refuse to work for Rek after learning he steals. Dozer, Gigi and Beepers help the Jedi younglings defeat Rek and his minions, and recover the stolen vocabulator. After returning the vocabulator to Dotti, the Jedi younglings adopt the three astromech. The Jedi younglings, Dozer, Gigi and Beepers travel to Black Spire Outpost on Batuu to deliver a package to Master Carver Drow. However, they lose the package while distracted by a ball-throwing vendor. A trash collector droid takes the package in his trash hauler to the city dump. The Jedi and their droids try to stop the trash hauler but are each time distracted. They meet the kindly trash collector droid who gives them a ride to the rubbish dump. After navigating through the automated rubbish compression system, they manage to retrieve the package, which they learn is a Tenoo tree sapling that is part of Drow’s experiments. The younglings then take their new droid friends on a tour of Black Spire Outpost.
50	2	"Music Mayhem"	Anthony Bell	Ghia Godfree	December 8, 2025	December 9, 2025
50	2	"The Night Lights of Tenoo"	Shellie Kvilvang-O'Brien	Sarah Nerboso	December 8, 2025	December 9, 2025
The three Jedi younglings, Nash and RJ-83 reunite with the Nash's favorite band, the Ku-Bops, on the snowy world of Andraven for a concert. Lacking confidence in his abilities, the Ku-Bops' drummer droid, K1-T (Kit), is enticed by the rogue droidsmith Rek, who offers to give him upgrades. With the Ku-Bops missing their drummer, the Jedi younglings embark on a mission to rescue Kit from Rek, who wants to add the droid to his collection. After convincing Kit that he is good enough, the younglings escape back to the concert hall but are pursued by Rek and his droid minions. Nash helps the younglings defeat Rek and free Kit from his upgrades. Kit rejoins his bandmates near the end of their song and helps impress the crowd. The Jedi younglings accompany Padawan Celesta Kami on a camping trip into Tenoo's Blue Forest, seeking to watch a group of passing meteors known as the Night Lights of Tenoo. However, Kami is preoccupied with using her holocam to photograph and record her travels. Their presence attracts the attention of a group of mischievous blue meekas, who steal and play with Kami's holocam. One of the blue meekas leads the Jedi into a deep pit. Working together, Kami and the younglings abseil out of the pit with the help of the meeka. Together, they climb on top of a tree and watch the meteor show. The Jedi also befriend a meeka, who returns the stolen holocam. Kami learns to live in the moment and enjoy life.
51	3	"Journey to the Bottom of Naboo"	Casey Lowe	Adrian McNair	December 8, 2025	December 10, 2025
51	3	"Speeder Surprise"	Anthony Bell	Ghia Godfree	December 8, 2025	December 10, 2025
On behalf of OG-LC, the three Jedi younglings undertake an underwater mission to Lake Paonga to retrieve a Jedi relic known as the star compass from a sunken starship called the Twilight Explorer. They are accompanied by their Gungan guide Kluurg and travel in a Gungan submarine. Their recovery mission is complicated by the presence of the Gungan criminal Tooba Jinx, who wants to sell the star compass. Though Tooba steals the compass, his submarine is attacked by a Colo claw fish. Kai and his companions rescue Tooba while Lys distracts the creature. Kluurg retrieves the star compass, which contains the last trajectory of the Twilight Explorer. Nash Durango gifts Kai, Lys and Nubs along with their droids Beepers, Gigi and Dozer new speeder bikers equipped with sidecars. The trio take their astromech droids on a field trip into the grasslands of Tenoo where they encounter Zippy, a lost lakeetah cub who has become separated from his pack. The Jedi younglings and their droids undertake a mission to reunite Zippy with his pack. During the mission, Kai learns the importance of listening to advice from Beepers after crashing his speeder bike into the mud.
52	4	"Scrapping for a Song"	Casey Lowe	Sarah Nerboso	December 8, 2025	December 11, 2025
52	4	"Bell and the Band"	Shellie Kvilvang-O'Brien	Greg Iwinski	December 8, 2025	December 11, 2025
Seeking to obtain a vio-harp for one of her mothers Kryys, Nash travels with her Jedi friends and their droids to the junkyard world of Bracca. They are aided by the local guide Eren Kitt. However, a trash collector beats them to the vio-harp. While Nash and Eren search for the vio-harp, the Jedi younglings Kai, Lys and Nubs obtain three instruments with the help of their droids. Nash manages to retrieve the vio-harp but loses it to a large monster known as a mygora. Though Nash is disappointed at the loss of the vio-harp, Kryys appreciates the other instruments and invites Nash and Ceeli to join them in playing the instruments. Kai accompanies Padawan Bell Zettifar to his friend Jasa Plynn's music store to get his damaged vioddle repaired. However, a rogue musician named Newf Grayson uses a sound wave modulator to enchant Bell's pet charhound Ember and the other local animals including Jasa's feline pet Flim. Grayson intends to use the animals as his captive audience while he plays his kloo horn. Kai manages to free the animals by overloading Grayson's sound wave modulator. A chastened Grayson makes amends and helps the Jedi and Jasa return the animals to their owners.
53	5	"To Do Good"	Anthony Bell	Katie Kaniewski	December 8, 2025	December 12, 2025
53	5	"Nubs and the Bumbling Bandits"	Shellie Kvilvang-O'Brien	Christian Streaty	December 8, 2025	December 12, 2025
The rogue droidsmith Rek steals three farming droids from Prince Cyrus Vuundir's subjects. Cyrus attempts to retrieve the droids but is captured by Rek. In desperation, he seeks help from the Jedi younglings Kai, Lys and Nus. Despite Kai's distrust of Cyrus, Lys convinces him to help their friend. They free Cyrus but are trapped by Rek and his droids. Cyrus abandons his Jedi friends in an attempt to confront Rek alone but is jettisoned into an escape pod. Seeking to make amends, Cyrus regains control of the escape pod and rescues his Jedi friends. With Kai's help, Cyrus defeats Rek and forces him to return the stolen droids. Following their adventure, Cyrus and Kai renew their friendship. While Nubs is traveling with Padawan Wes Vinik to a training demonstration on Deppani, their starship's power converter is stolen by three Ugnaught bandits Claro, Daro and Flip. The Ugnaught bandits also rob several local businesses. While Nubs and Vinik attempt to apprehend the bandits, they are trapped in an oily puddle. Nubs loses his temper but Vinik teaches him the importance of staying calm and meditation. Using a speeder bike lent by the shop owner Jenken, the two pursue the Ugnaught bandits' landspeeder. Nubs uses his Force powers and training to detach the landspeeder's trailer. The Jedi force the bandits to return their ill-gotten gains and clean up the mess. Nubs and Vinik then travel to Deppani where they impress the local factory workers with their lightsaber demonstration.
54	6	"Apexx Awakens"	Casey Lowe	Ghia Godfree	December 8, 2025	December 15, 2025
54	6	"Harvester Madness"	Anthony Bell	Adrian McNair	December 8, 2025	December 15, 2025
While the Jedi younglings are helping the junk dealer Marlaa Jinara sort her junkyard, Rek sends his spider droids to steal one of her droid JG-1's power cells, intending to use it to power his new battle droid Apexx. Rek lures Kai, Lys and Nubs aboard his starship, where he unleashes Apexx against them. Though the Jedi are unable to best the powerful droid in combat, Solay convinces her friends to deplete Apexx's stolen power cell by leading him on a chase. Rek concedes defeat and allows the Jedi to reclaim the stolen power cell. Jinara recharges the power cell and reinstalls it in JG-1. While the Jedi younglings are visiting their friend Raxlo on Andraven, the businessman introduces them to his new harvester. Raxlo has sold his previous harvester to the Hutt crime lord Bulcha, who uses the machine to harvest tenga rocks in the wellagrins' habitat. With information provided by Raxlo, the Jedi manage to disable Bulcha's harvester. In retaliation, Bulcha and his Nikto guard seize Raxlo's new harvester and continue their destructive harvest. After repairing his old harvester, Raxlo and the Jedi use it to fight Bulcha's stolen harvester. Following a brief battle, Nubs uses a remote to activate the stolen harvester's sound system, which overpowers the intruders. After seeing Bulcha and his Nikto henchman off, Raxlo proceeds to repair his two damaged harvesters while promising to protect the wellagrins.
55	7	"Making Friends"	Anthony Bell, Shellie Kvilvang-O'Brien & Casey Lowe	Michael Olson & Katie Kaniewski	December 8, 2025	December 19, 2025
The Jedi younglings and the residents of Kublop Springs prepare to welcome a new cohort of younglings at Welcome Day. Meanwhile, Rek develops a wrist remote capable of controlling bug bots that can hijack droids. He intends to use them to lure new droid friends to his workshop. Apexx however is determined to ruin Welcome Day in order to expel the Jedi from Reboot. With Rek not agreeing to his plan, Apexx imprisons his creator and takes over the other droids. Apexx attacks Kublop Springs and takes over the local droids including RJ-83, Beepers, Dozer and Gigi. Kai, Lys and Nubs rescue Rek and join forces with Cyrus, Nash, Pord and EB-3 to lead the residents in fighting back and removing the bug bots. Following a climatic showdown, the Jedi and Rek manage to reason with Apexx, who ends hostilities and helps clean up before the Welcome Festival. Rek, Apexx and Rek's droids join Dotti's workshop. In the epilogue, Kai, Lys and Nubs become Jedi Padawans who progress through their training. Years later, the teenagers later meet with Nash and Cyrus for a reunion on Tenoo.

== Shorts ==
Season	Episodes	Originally released	
Season	Episodes	First released	Last released
1	6	March 27, 2023	April 24, 2023
Fun with Nubs	10	June 14, 2024	July 26, 2024
Fun with Nubs	10	February 1, 2025	March 19, 2025
2	6	August 2, 2024	

=== Season 1 shorts (2023) ===
No.	Title	Disney+ release date	YouTube release date
1	"Meet the Young Jedi"	April 26, 2023	March 27, 2023
Kai Brightstar, Lys Solay and Nubs work together to battle a training droid at the Jedi Temple on Tenoo. After discovering that the droid is too powerful for younglings like them, the trio attempt to deactivate the droid but it proves too strong despite their combined efforts. Kai contacts their friend Nash Durango and her droid RJ-83, who successfully deactivate the training droid. Solay's pet lizard topples several bricks. Yoda saves the younglings and commends them for learning about teamwork. He allows the three Jedi to depart on a mission with Durango.
2	"Lys' Creature Caper"	April 26, 2023	March 27, 2023
While transporting a tooka kitten to a nature reserve on Tenoon, Nash visits Lys at the Tenoo Jedi Temple. However, the tooka escapes its carrier while chasing a blue insect. After interrupting Kai's lightsaber exercise, the tooka runs amok through the Jedi Temple. Lys manages to corner the kitten inside a bedroom and returns the animal to Durango.
3	"Kai's Daring Droid Rescue"	April 26, 2023	March 27, 2023
While Nash and RJ-83 are repairing her sailing ship, RJ-83 is swept away by a river current. Meanwhile, Kai struggles during a levitation lesson with Yoda. He receives Nash's distress call and heads to the river to help her. The two race after RJ-83 on speeder bikes, with the river leading down a waterfall. Putting his trust in the Force, Kai forms a Force barrier at the waterfall. This allows Nash to pluck RJ-83 to safety before he falls over the edge. With his confidence restored, Kai is able to lift rocks back at the Temple.
4	"Nubs and the Flower Fiasco"	April 26, 2023	April 3, 2023
Nubs, Kai and Lys visit a nearby forest to gather a Zeilla flower for the Jedi Temple. Nubs finds the flower perched on a high branch but encounters a large green and red bird, which catapults him into the sky. Nubs uses his Force powers to land safely on the bird's back. After the bird throws him off, Nubs makes a second attempt but encounters the bird again. Realizing the bird is fascinated with the lightsaber, he uses it to convince the creature to give him a ride so that he can pluck the Zeilla flower from a tree.
5	"Nash's Firehawk Frenzy"	April 26, 2023	April 17, 2023
While returning from a mission to bring back a holocron to the Tenoo Jedi Temple, Nash's starship Crimson Hawk is pursued by the young pirate Taborr Val Dorn's starship. In an attempt to lose Taborr, Nash and her Jedi friends fly their ship through an asteroid field. Working together, the younglings avoid getting crushed by asteroids and escape Taborr and a space slug. Despite escaping Taborr's ship, the Crimson Firehawk is struck by an asteroid as it descends into Tenoo's atmosphere. Nash crashlands the ship at the Tenoo Jedi Temple.
6	"Taborr's Pirate Showdown"	April 26, 2023	April 24, 2023
When Taborr and his band of pirates pillage the Kublop Springs marketplace, Kai, Lys and Nubs spring into action to stop them. Following a verbal confrontation, the Jedi attempt to retrieve the pirates' cart containing the loot with their Force powers. However, Taborr's Gamorrean associate Pord harries the Jedi. Kai engages in a duel with Taborr but loses. Despite their initial setback, Kai convinces his friends not to give up and they pursue the pirates to the spaceport. Following a tug of war, the Jedi succeed in retrieving the pirate's cart using their Force powers. Taborr and his associates leave empty-handed.

=== Fun with Nubs (2024–25) ===
An accompanying digital series, titled Fun with Nubs, was released on June 14, 2024.

No.	Title	Original release date
1	"Nubs Loses His Lightsaber"	June 14, 2024
While chomping on a juicy fruit, Nubs loses his lightsaber, which rolls down a hill into a nearby river. A fish-like flitterpod steals it. Nubs uses a vine to retrieve his lightsaber and lands in a bush.
2	"RJ Repairs the Firehawk"	June 14, 2024
While traveling in space, the Crimson Firehawk is hit by an asteroid. Nash sends RJ-83 outside the starship hull to repair the damaged cables, restoring the ship's systems. A second asteroid hits the ship but the two decide not to worry about it.
3	"Nubs Cleans Up"	June 14, 2024
Following meal at the Tenoo Jedi Temple's cafeteria, Nubs spots two spots which he uses a dish clop to mop up. Nubs spends the whole night cleaning the cafeteria for spots and faints from exhaustion at breakfast time.
4	"RJ Needs a Tool"	June 14, 2024
RJ-83 attempts to retrieve a drill from a high shelf in Nash Durango's garage. After several failed attempts, the astromech droid uses a stack of boxes to reach the drill. Though he retrieves the drill, he is left with a big mess.
5	"Nubs Tries to Meditate"	June 21, 2024
While meditating at the base of giant Tenoo tree, Nubs is disturbed by a large green bird. After several attempts to shoo the bird away, Nubs makes peace with the bird and lets it rest on his head.
6	"RJ Goes for a Swim"	June 28, 2024
While helping Nash to repair the Crimson Bolt on the banks of Kublop Spring's river, RJ-83 drops a drill into the river. He dives underwater to retrieve it and has to fight off fish-like flitterpods and crustaceans. Following his adventure, he drops the drill again and has to dive back into the river.
7	"Nubs Gardens"	July 5, 2024
While tending to his garden plot at the Tenoo Jedi Temple, Nubs discovers that a rodent has been stealing several carrot-like vegetables. Following a pursuit, Nubs catches the creature and decides to share a carrot with it.
8	"RJ Fixes the Speeder"	July 12, 2024
RJ-83 makes four failed attempts to repair Nash Durango's landspeeder. On the fifth attempt, RJ-83 manages to repair the speeder's repulsorlift system only to crash when he presses the accelerate button.
9	"Nubs and RJ Dance"	July 19, 2024
RJ-83 repairs the subspace radio aboard the Crimson Firehawk. RJ-83 and Nubs dance to an upbeat tune from the radio. RJ-83 accidentally changes the tune while swinging his appendages. Nubs has trouble keeping up with the new moves.
10	"Nubs Can't Stop Sneezing"	July 26, 2024
While walking with RJ-83 through a patch of flowers, Nubs experiences an allergic reaction. RJ-83, who is unaware that he is covered with pollen, attempts to help his friend but his intervention makes the situation worst. Realizing that RJ-83 is covered in pollen, Nubs bathes him in a pod. The two celebrate together.
11	"Nubs Gets Stuck"	February 1, 2025
While exploring a cavern beneath a large Tenoo tree, Nubs gets himself stuck in sticky yellow sap. RJ-83 attempts to free him but the two end up stuck on a wall. Nub however discovers that the sap is edible and licks it off himself and RJ. Freed, the two celebrate together.
12	"RJ Makes a Friend"	February 8, 2025
While putting the tools back into Nash's garage, RJ-83 attempts to drive away an amphibian Castilian gorg. He decides to make peace with the gorg and allows it to reside in a chest box.
13	"Nubs Learns to Paint"	February 15, 2025
While painting with his friends Kai and Lys, Nubs struggles to find inspiration. Nubs attempts to copy Lys' painting of a Tenoo tree but botches it. However, Lys encourages him to look on the positive side since it shows the sun setting on the forest.
14	"RJ Makes Music"	February 22, 2025
RJ-83 cheers up a despondent Nash Durango with the help of the musicians Feb Rozo and Mada Vangu. The music cheers Nash up and she thanks RJ.
15	"Nubs Tries to Sleep"	March 1, 2025
While attempting to sleep, Nubs is disturbed by the croaking sounds of a gorg. After attempting to remove the picture, Nubs makes peace with the amphibian and allows it to rest over his eyes.
16	"RJ Learns to Fly"	March 5, 2025
While flying kites on the grounds of the Tenoo Jedi Temple, RJ-83 is menaced by two green birds, which sweep him into the air with their wings. RJ tries in vain to flee the birds.
17	"Nubs Gets a Tummy Ache"	March 8, 2025
A greedy Nubs gorges on too many cookies at the Tenoo Jedi Temple's cafeteria, causing him indigestion. This affects his training activities and causes Nubs to avoid Kai's offer of cookies.
18	"RJ Makes a Speedy Delivery"	March 12, 2025
RJ-83 delivers three icecreams to his friends Kai, Lys and Nubs. However, he loses two icecreams after colliding with Feb Rozo and the Sap Tap Trio's billboard and after racing down a waterfall. Fortunately, the Jedi younglings agree to share the last remaining icecream.
19	"Nubs Faces a Bug"	March 15, 2025
While training on the grounds of the Tenoo Jedi Temple, Nubs is menaced by biffleflies. After trying to avoid them, he decides to make peace with the insects.
20	"Nubs and RJ Jam Out"	March 19, 2025
Nubs and RJ-83 create music using instruments and machinery in Nash's garage.

=== Season 2 shorts (2024) ===
No.	Title	Original release date
1	"Firehawk Rescue"	August 2, 2024
Kai, Lys, Nubs and Nash repair Vela's starship on a desert world. Before they can leave, the Ganguls pirate gang arrive in their new starship Rathtar's Revenge, intent on stealing the Crimson Firehawk and Vela's starship. Nash comes up with a plan to use the Firehawk to bait the pirates, allowing Vela to escape. The younglings flee into an underground tunnel. The Rathtar's Revenge follows but is too big and hits the tunnel entrance. The younglings escape into space.
2	"Skyring Soaring"	August 2, 2024
Master Zia's new Padawan Wes Vinik joins the younglings for a Jedi Vector flight lesson, which involves flying through sky rings above Tenoo's forest. Vinik demonstrates a successful test flight with his Jedi Vector. An overconfident Kai has trouble emulating Vinik's successful flight and encounters several obstacles. Brightstar is distraught but Vinik convinces him to fly again together.
3	"A Droid's Mission"	August 2, 2024
After the Crimson Firehawk breaks down, Wes dispatches the bickering astromech droids R0-M1 and RJ-83 to salvage a forward thruster plug from Marlaa's junkyard. The two droids fight to obtain the thruster plug first, causing them to lose the device to a loaded droid which loads the thruster plug into a hovertrain carrying salvage. R0-M1 and RJ-83 put aside their differences and recover the thruster plug following a chase. They return to the others as friends.
4	"Younglings in the Wild"	August 2, 2024
Lys Solay takes the new Jedi younglings Bren, Linh and the Rodian Zotti on a tour of the Tenoo tree forest. They encounter a winged Sharptailed Fellwing, which takes Zotti on a ride to its nest. Believing Zotti is in danger, Lys leads the younglings on a rescue mission. Using the Force, they manage to summon a vine to reach the Fellwing's nest where they find Zotti playing with the bird. The four younglings then visit the glowing lightle bugs.
5	"Junkyard Joust"	August 2, 2024
While on an errand to collect a speeder part from Marlaa's junkyard, Kai encounters his pirate nemesis Taborr Val Dorn. Believing that Taborr has come to steal, he engages the pirate in a lightsaber duel. Taborr fights back with his twin electro staffs. Kai gains the upper hand after three rounds but is interrupted by Marlaa, who reveals that Taborr had bought parts for his starship. After Taborr salvages the supplies he needs, Kai is reminded that the pirate is capable of good.
6	"Nubs-tacle Course"	August 2, 2024
Jedi Master Yoda visits the younglings during an obstacle course on the grounds of the Tenoo Jedi Temple. Kai completes the obstacle course successfully but his friend Nubs struggles. Nubs wants to give up but Yoda encourages him to stay calm and focus with the help of the Force. Listening to Yoda's advice, Nubs completes the obstacle course successfully during the second attempt.
