= Star Wars: Ahsoka season 1 =

Season of television series

Ahsoka
- Season 1
- Promotional poster
- Showrunner: Dave Filoni
- Starring: Rosario Dawson; Natasha Liu Bordizzo; Mary Elizabeth Winstead; Ray Stevenson; Ivanna Sakhno; Diana Lee Inosanto; David Tennant; Eman Esfandi; Evan Whitten; Genevieve O'Reilly; Hayden Christensen; Ariana Greenblatt; Lars Mikkelsen; Anthony Daniels
- No. of episodes: 8

Release
- Original network: Disney+
- Original release: August 22 – October 3, 2023

Season chronology
- Next → Season 2

The first season of the American television series Ahsoka is part of the Star Wars franchise, taking place in the same timeframe as the series The Mandalorian (2019–2023) after the events of the film Return of the Jedi (1983). It follows former Jedi apprentice Ahsoka Tano and her allies as they try to prevent Grand Admiral Thrawn from returning and uniting the remnants of the Galactic Empire against the fledgling New Republic. The season was produced by Lucasfilm and Golem Creations, with Dave Filoni as showrunner.

Rosario Dawson stars as the title character, reprising her role from The Mandalorian. Natasha Liu Bordizzo, Mary Elizabeth Winstead, Ray Stevenson, Ivanna Sakhno, Diana Lee Inosanto, David Tennant, Eman Esfandi, Evan Whitten, Genevieve O'Reilly, Hayden Christensen, Ariana Greenblatt, Lars Mikkelsen (Thrawn), and Anthony Daniels also star. A spin-off from The Mandalorian focused on Ahsoka was announced in December 2020. Filoni used the season to tell a story he had been planning since the end of the animated series Star Wars Rebels (2014–2018). It explores Ahsoka following Star Wars: The Clone Wars (2008–2020) and Rebels, and brings key characters from Rebels into live-action such as Sabine Wren (Bordizzo). Filming took place in Los Angeles from May to October 2022, using the same StageCraft virtual production technology as The Mandalorian.

The season premiered on the streaming service Disney+ on August 22, 2023, with its first two episodes. The other six episodes were released through October 3. Viewership was estimated to be high and comparable to other Star Wars series on Disney+. Reviews were generally positive, with particular praise for the performances of Dawson and Stevenson, but there was criticism for the slow pacing and some of the visuals and action sequences. The season received various accolades, including five Primetime Creative Arts Emmy Award nominations. It won one of those, a posthumous award for costume designer Shawna Trpcic. A second season was confirmed in January 2024.

== Episodes ==
No. overall	No. in season	Title	Directed by	Written by	Original release date
1	1	"Part One: Master and Apprentice"	Dave Filoni	Dave Filoni	August 22, 2023
Baylan Skoll, a fallen Jedi, and his apprentice Shin Hati assault a New Republic cruiser to free Morgan Elsbeth. Morgan informs them that former Jedi Ahsoka Tano, who apprehended and interrogated Morgan, is searching for a star map that will lead to Thrawn. The last remaining grand admiral of the fallen Galactic Empire, Thrawn has been missing for years since he and rebel hero Ezra Bridger were taken to an unknown location by a pod of purrgil (space whales). Ahsoka fears that Thrawn could return and help rebuild the Empire, but is also hopeful that Ezra can be found alive. She and Huyang, an ancient Jedi-training droid, obtain the star map based on information from Morgan, but are unable to unlock it. New Republic general Hera Syndulla informs Ahsoka of Morgan's escape and suggests she get help unlocking the map from Sabine Wren, Ahsoka's former Padawan learner; Hera and Sabine were both close with Ezra before his disappearance. Ahsoka reluctantly visits Sabine, who she has not seen in years, on Lothal. After Sabine unlocks the map, Shin steals it and stabs Sabine during a lightsaber duel.
2	2	"Part Two: Toil and Trouble"	Steph Green	Dave Filoni	August 22, 2023
Baylan and Shin take the map to the planet Seatos. Morgan explains that Thrawn is trapped in another galaxy and the map shows the path to get there, starting from Seatos. While recovering from Shin's attack, Sabine tells Ahsoka about the map but does not know which planet the path to the other galaxy starts on. Ahsoka defeats an assassin droid that Shin left behind on Lothal and Sabine traces its origins to Morgan's factories on Corellia. Ahsoka and Hera travel to the Corellian shipyards where they discover a massive hyperdrive being built by workers loyal to the Empire. As a transport takes off with the hyperdrive, Hera chases after it while Ahsoka duels Marrok, a former Jedi-hunting Imperial Inquisitor who is working with Baylan and Shin. Marrok and the transport escape, but not before Hera's astromech droid Chopper attaches a tracking device to the transport. Ahsoka and Hera arrest the shipyard workers. After a discussion with Huyang, Sabine decides that she wants to accompany Ahsoka and become her Padawan again. Ahsoka gets Sabine from Lothal and they follow the tracking device to Seatos.
3	3	"Part Three: Time to Fly"	Steph Green	Dave Filoni	August 29, 2023
Sabine restarts her lightsaber training under Ahsoka and Huyang's guidance, but struggles with her inability to use the Force like other Jedi. Hera meets with New Republic chancellor Mon Mothma and several senators, asking them to send additional forces to Seatos. Her request is denied when Senator Hamato Xiono, who does not believe Thrawn and Ezra are alive, accuses Hera of using the threat of Thrawn's return to re-direct resources to a futile search for Ezra. Ahsoka, Sabine, and Huyang arrive at Seatos and discover the Eye of Sion, Morgan's large starship in which the hyperdrive is being installed. Shin and Marrok attack with a squadron of fighters, during which Ahsoka attempts to continue Sabine's lessons. Forced to land on the planet below, they pass through a pod of purrgil, evade the fighters, and hide in a forest. Based on a scan of the Eye of Sion, Huyang determines that the ship can make an unusually fast and long hyperspace jump which would allow Morgan to reach the other galaxy, something that migrating purrgil can do naturally. Baylan sends Shin, Marrok, and assassin droids to find them.
4	4	"Part Four: Fallen Jedi"	Peter Ramsey	Dave Filoni	September 5, 2023
Ahsoka, Sabine, and Huyang dispatch Baylan's droids. Fearing that Morgan and Baylan will soon have what they need to jump to the other galaxy, Ahsoka and Sabine head towards Baylan's location. Huyang asks them to stay together, and Ahsoka warns Sabine that they may need to give up the chance to find Ezra if it means preventing Thrawn's return. Confronted by Shin and Marrok, Ahsoka kills Marrok while Sabine fights Shin and encourages Ahsoka to go on alone. Ahsoka engages Baylan and retrieves the map, but drops it when it burns her hand. Shin flees when Sabine gets the upperhand, and Sabine arrives to see Baylan send Ahsoka plummeting into the ocean. Sabine threatens to destroy the map, but hands it over when Baylan promises to reunite her with Ezra. The map's details are uploaded to the Eye of Sion and then Baylan destroys the map. They jump to hyperspace as Hera arrives, against orders, with a squadron of New Republic fighters. Ahsoka awakens in the "World Between Worlds", a mystical plane that connects different points of time, and sees her former master Anakin Skywalker.
5	5	"Part Five: Shadow Warrior"	Dave Filoni	Dave Filoni	September 12, 2023
Anakin tells Ahsoka that she has a chance to survive and he has come to finish her training. He asks her to choose to live, and attacks her. On Seatos, Hera and Huyang search for Ahsoka and Sabine. Hera's son Jacen, who has a connection to the Force like his father Kanan Jarrus, hears the sounds of Ahsoka and Anakin fighting and directs the search party. Ahsoka relives fragments of her youth during the Clone Wars and expresses concerns about her legacy as a soldier and as the student of Anakin, who fell to the dark side and became the Sith lord Darth Vader before being redeemed with his death. As Anakin continues to fight her, Ahsoka comes to terms with these issues and chooses to live. Anakin disappears and the others find Ahsoka in the ocean. She wakes up with a new outlook on life and uses the Force to determine that Sabine went with Baylan to the new galaxy. New Republic forces arrive to take Hera and Ahsoka into custody. Before they can, Ahsoka and Huyang enter the mouth of a purrgil so the pod can take them to the new galaxy. Hera and Jacen remain behind.
6	6	"Part Six: Far, Far Away"	Jennifer Getzinger	Dave Filoni	September 19, 2023
The Eye of Sion arrives at Peridea, the ancient homeworld of Morgan's people—the Nightsister witches—who were the first to harness the purrgil and travel between galaxies. Morgan, Baylan, Shin, and Sabine meet the Great Mothers, three Nightsisters still living on Peridea who are allies of Thrawn and who used their Force magic to call Morgan to them. Baylan reveals to Shin that he is searching for a great power on Peridea that he learned about in Jedi folktales. He hopes to use this to end the cycle of war and destruction between the light and dark sides of the Force, as seen with the fall of the Jedi and rise of the Empire. Thrawn arrives aboard his Star Destroyer, the Chimaera, and honors Baylan's promise by providing Sabine with provisions and a mount to search for Ezra. After she leaves, Thrawn has Baylan and Shin follow her so they can kill both her and Ezra once the latter is found. Surviving an ambush by bandits, Sabine encounters a local tribe, the Noti, and goes to their village where she reunites with Ezra. The Great Mothers sense Ahsoka's imminent arrival and Thrawn prepares his defences.
7	7	"Part Seven: Dreams and Madness"	Geeta Vasant Patel	Dave Filoni	September 26, 2023
At a disciplinary hearing on Coruscant, Senator Xiono requests that Hera be court-martialed for disobeying orders. Senator Leia Organa, an ally to Hera and Ahsoka, sends her protocol droid C-3PO with fake evidence that Hera's actions were a miscommunication; the court absolves Hera. She and Mothma discuss the threat of Thrawn's possible return. Sabine catches Ezra up with what he has missed since disappearing. When the purrgil arrive at Peridea, they enter a minefield left by Thrawn. Ahsoka and Huyang exit their purrgil's mouth before it flees, and hide in a debris field until Ahsoka locates Sabine through the Force. Ezra, Sabine, and the Noti are attacked by Shin, the bandits, and Thrawn's night troopers. Sabine offers Ezra's old lightsaber to him, but he tells her to keep it and fights with the Force instead. Ahsoka confronts Baylan, but he leaves to pursue his own agenda. Realizing that Baylan is no longer fighting for him, Thrawn withdraws his troops after Ahsoka arrives. Shin is left behind and flees after spurning an invitation from Ahsoka to join them. Ahsoka reunites with Sabine and Ezra.
8	8	"Part Eight: The Jedi, the Witch, and the Warlord"	Rick Famuyiwa	Dave Filoni	October 3, 2023
The Chimaera is loaded with a mysterious cargo and docks with the Eye of Sion. Ezra constructs a new lightsaber using spare parts from the saber of Kanan, his master. Huyang tells Ezra that Ahsoka originally stopped training Sabine out of fear for her potential after Sabine's family were killed during the purge of Mandalore. Ahsoka now says she is committed to Sabine. Ahsoka, Sabine, and Ezra are attacked by Thrawn's night troopers and Morgan. The Great Mothers use magic to resurrect the troopers each time they are killed. While Ahsoka duels Morgan, Sabine and Ezra reach the Chimaera as it departs. Sabine uses the Force for the first time to save herself, and then uses it again to help Ezra onto the Chimaera; she stays behind to help Ahsoka, who kills Morgan. Thrawn and the Great Mothers arrive in the other galaxy at the Nightsister planet Dathomir. Ezra sneaks away and reunites with Hera. On Peridea, Shin joins the bandits; Baylan discovers statues of the Mortis gods that point the way for his journey; and Ahsoka, Sabine, and Huyang settle in with the Noti while Anakin's spirit watches over them.

== Cast and characters ==
=== Starring ===
- Rosario Dawson as Ahsoka Tano
  - Ariana Greenblatt as young Ahsoka
- Natasha Liu Bordizzo as Sabine Wren
- Mary Elizabeth Winstead as Hera Syndulla
- Ray Stevenson as Baylan Skoll
- Ivanna Sakhno as Shin Hati
- Diana Lee Inosanto as Morgan Elsbeth
- David Tennant voices Huyang
- Eman Esfandi as Ezra Bridger
- Evan Whitten as Jacen Syndulla
- Genevieve O'Reilly as Mon Mothma
- Hayden Christensen as Anakin Skywalker / Darth Vader
- Lars Mikkelsen as Grand Admiral Thrawn
- Anthony Daniels as C-3PO

=== Recurring ===
- Paul Darnell as Marrok
- Dave Filoni as Chopper
- Nican Robinson as Vic Hawkins
- Paul Sun-Hyung Lee as Carson Teva
- Jeryl Prescott Gallien as Aktropaw
- Claudia Black as Klothow
- Jane Edwina Seymour as Lakesis
- Wes Chatham as Enoch

=== Guests ===
- Clancy Brown as Ryder Azadi
- Vinny Thomas as Jai Kell
- Nelson Lee as Hamato Xiono
- Temuera Morrison as Captain Rex
- Elden Bennett as Admiral Ackbar

== Production ==
=== Background ===
Ahsoka Tano was created for the animated series Star Wars: The Clone Wars (2008–2020) by Star Wars creator George Lucas and The Clone Wars supervising director Dave Filoni. Voiced by Ashley Eckstein, the character is the Jedi apprentice of Anakin Skywalker, the main character of the Star Wars prequel films (1999–2005). Ahsoka became a fan favorite character and Eckstein reprised her role for the follow-up animated series Star Wars Rebels (2014–2018). Rebels was co-created by Filoni and focuses on a group of heroes who resist the Galactic Empire: the Jedi Kanan Jarrus, his apprentice Ezra Bridger, pilot Hera Syndulla, Mandalorian warrior Sabine Wren, Zeb Orrelios, and Hera's droid Chopper. During Rebels, Ahsoka learns that Anakin has fallen to the dark side of the Force and become the Sith lord Darth Vader. In the final season, Kanan sacrifices his life and Ezra is taken to an unknown location with antagonist Grand Admiral Thrawn. The series ends with an epilogue in which Ahsoka joins Sabine to search for Ezra, leading to speculation about a new series focusing on the pair. Filoni said he had ideas for that story but nothing was in development. He described bringing the two characters together as "a unification of Clone Wars and Rebels", and said he would not want someone else to tell that story.

The franchise expanded to live-action television with the Disney+ series The Mandalorian (2019–2023). Creator Jon Favreau worked with Filoni to develop the series, which is set after the fall of the Empire. When thinking how to reveal details about the Jedi to the series' characters, Filoni realized that Ahsoka could provide that information. After writing and directing episodes of the first season, he felt confident enough in his filmmaking abilities to be able to introduce her to live-action in the second season without "mess[ing] it up"; it was important to Filoni that fans who grew up watching the animated Ahsoka feel that a live-action version was the same character. Disney CEO Bob Iger said in February 2020 that spin-offs of The Mandalorian were being considered, and there was potential to add characters to the series to then give them their own series. Rosario Dawson was reported to be cast as Ahsoka for the second season a month later, but this was not officially confirmed until the episode she appears in, "Chapter 13: The Jedi", was released in November. Dawson studied acting with Hayden Christensen, who portrayed Anakin in the prequel films, and first expressed interest in playing Ahsoka in live-action after her casting was suggested by a fan in February 2017. Filoni wrote and directed the episode, which depicts Ahsoka searching for Thrawn; Filoni suggested that this is before Ahsoka joins Sabine in the epilogue of Rebels. The episode introduces Diana Lee Inosanto as Morgan Elsbeth, a servant of Thrawn.

=== Development ===
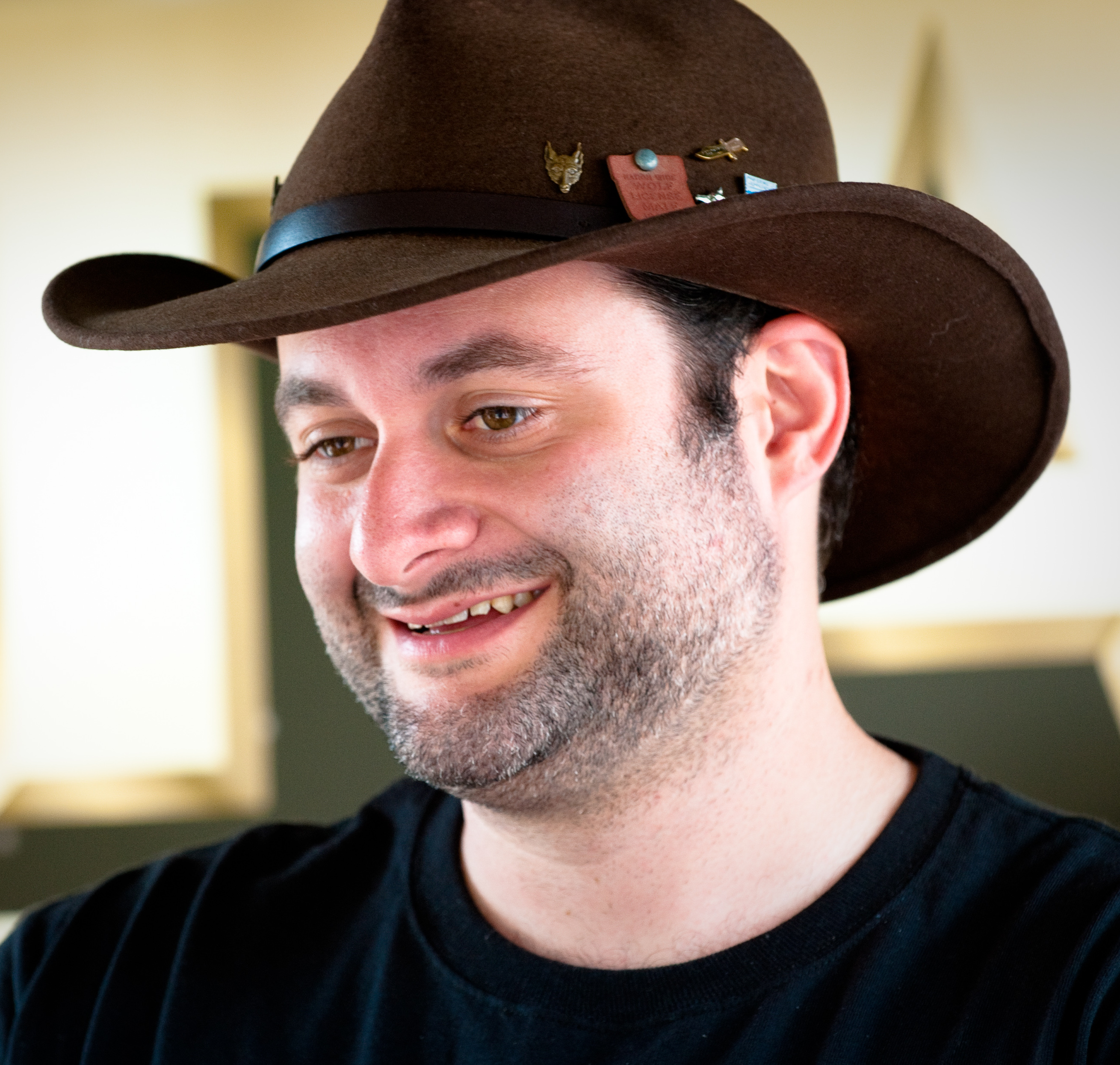
Creator and showrunner Dave Filoni wrote all eight episodes of the season, continuing storylines that he established in the animated series Star Wars: The Clone Wars and Star Wars Rebels

Lucasfilm announced several spin-off series from The Mandalorian in December 2020, including The Book of Boba Fett (2021) and Ahsoka. The spin-offs were set in the same timeframe as The Mandalorian—during the 30 years between the films Return of the Jedi (1983) and Star Wars: The Force Awakens (2015)—and were planned to culminate in a "climactic story event"; Filoni indicated that this would involve a conflict with the remnants of the Empire which Ahsoka helps build towards. The spin-offs were being concurrently developed by Favreau and Filoni, with Filoni creating, writing, and serving as lead producer and showrunner on Ahsoka. Lucasfilm's Kathleen Kennedy, Carrie Beck, and Colin Wilson were also executive producers. Peter Ramsey was hired to direct an episode by April 2022, and Filoni was confirmed to be directing multiple episodes the next month. In April 2023, the season was revealed to have eight episodes, and the other directors were announced: Jennifer Getzinger, Geeta Patel, The Book of Boba Fett's Steph Green, and The Mandalorian's Rick Famuyiwa. Filoni said each episode would be similar in length to The Mandalorian's episodes, though he tended to prefer longer episodes than Favreau which sometimes needed to be edited down to improve pacing.

=== Writing ===
Following speculation and reports about the series, Filoni confirmed that Ahsoka would continue the story he established in the epilogue of Rebels. He never expected to tell this story as a spin-off from a series like The Mandalorian, and found it intimidating to actually write after thinking about it for so many years. When asked if Ahsoka was effectively a fifth season of Rebels, Filoni said that was "one way of looking at it" but he also saw all of his Star Wars projects as one larger story. He said viewers did not need to watch The Clone Wars and Rebels to understand Ahsoka but he felt it would help, and he hoped Ahsoka would lead to new audiences discovering the animated series on Disney+. The first person Filoni sent each script to was Beck, who he had been working with since the start of Rebels, and he also appreciated getting Favreau's advice from a perspective outside of Filoni's understanding of the animated history.

The season is set after Ahsoka's appearances in the second season of The Mandalorian and in The Book of Boba Fett, and takes place concurrently with the third season of The Mandalorian. It begins with Ahsoka as a wandering rōnin who Filoni compared to the main character of Akira Kurosawa's film Yojimbo (1961), noting that Lucas was inspired by the works of Kurosawa when creating Star Wars. This depiction of Ahsoka comes after her decision to leave the Jedi and the subsequent destruction of that order in The Clone Wars, as well as the revelation that Anakin is Darth Vader in Rebels. This season was Filoni's first opportunity to explore these issues with the character, and he wanted to show what she thinks this all means about her own potential for darkness. He also wanted to explore Ahsoka's feelings about continuing this legacy with an apprentice of her own, and the relationships between masters and apprentices became a key theme for the season. Ahsoka is revealed to have taken on Sabine as her Padawan learner after the main events of Rebels, but they parted ways soon after when Sabine's family were killed during the purge of Mandalore and her subsequent internal struggle reminded Ahsoka too much of Anakin. Filoni was planning this storyline by the end of Rebels, having come to feel that Sabine was more than just a Mandalorian warrior. He saw similarities between her and Anakin, and chose to pair Sabine with Ahsoka in the epilogue of Rebels because of the potential for a complicated relationship between the pair. He was also interested in someone training to be a Jedi without a strong connection to the Force, feeling that differentiated this story from most Star Wars projects and made it more relatable to the audience. Filoni believed this was possible within the franchise's established rules, which state that the Force is connected to all living beings, and he believed anyone could become a Jedi with the right training.

Borrowing from J. R. R. Tolkien's novel The Lord of the Rings (1954–55), Filoni wanted Ahsoka to go through a similar transformation to the character Gandalf who begins as the wandering, unsure "Gandalf the Grey" but is later reborn as the wise and powerful "Gandalf the White". This was hinted at in the epilogue of Rebels, in which Ahsoka appears wearing all white, leading some fans to call her "Ahsoka the White". The second episode of this season recreates the epilogue in live-action, but with Ahsoka wearing gray to allow her transformation to come later. In the fifth episode, she goes through a near-death experience in the mysterious "World Between Worlds" where spirit of Anakin helps Ahsoka work through her character issues. Filoni saw the World Between Worlds, first introduced in Rebels, as a "cinematic device" that allowed him to show flashbacks to the Clone Wars for viewers who had not seen that series. He did not want this to become a "Star Wars history lesson" and focused on the relationship between Ahsoka and Anakin. Filoni saw this as the turning point for Ahsoka, allowing her to accept her past and move forward, which is signified by a costume change to "Ahsoka the White" at the end of the episode. He wanted the audience to question whether the World Between Worlds was in Ahsoka's mind or if she was actually talking to the spirit of Anakin, and he wanted to keep the focus on Ahsoka's issues rather because he felt Lucas had already resolved Anakin's character arc in the Star Wars films. Filoni chose to depict Anakin as the "heroic older brother" and famous Jedi that Ahsoka once looked up to, and prioritized seeing Christensen's performance over the Darth Vader costume, which is only seen in brief flashes.

Ahsoka and Sabine's hunt for Thrawn and Ezra takes them to a new galaxy, which is a first for the franchise. Filoni was inspired by an image of multiple galaxies seen in the film Star Wars: Episode II – Attack of the Clones (2002), and felt this step was necessary because he thought it unlikely that Thrawn and Ezra would have remained hidden for so long if they were still in the known galaxy. For Thrawn's live-action introduction, Filoni and Favreau consulted author Timothy Zahn who created the character for the Expanded Universe (EU) novel Heir to the Empire (1991). The novel is referenced in the season when Ahsoka describes Thrawn as "the heir to the Empire". The planet that is visited in the new galaxy, Peridea, is the ancient homeworld of Morgan's people, the Nightsister witches. Similar to Thrawn, that group of characters were first introduced in an EU novel, in this case Dave Wolverton's The Courtship of Princess Leia (1994), before appearing in the animated shows. The three Nightsister "Great Mothers" who live on Peridea–Aktropaw, Klothow, and Lakesis–are named after the three Fates from Greek mythology: Atropos, Clotho, and Lachesis. Other antagonists introduced in the season include Baylan Skoll, a former Jedi who is disillusioned with that order and searching for a secret power; his apprentice Shin Hati, who he is teaching to be "something more" than a Jedi; and Marrok, a Jedi-hunting Inquisitor. Filoni always includes wolves or references to wolves in his work because of his love for the animals, and the names Skoll and Hati are references to wolves from Norse mythology–Sköll and Hati, respectively–while Marrok is named for a lesser-known Knight of the Round Table from Arthurian legend who is turned into a werewolf.

The season ends with Ahsoka and Sabine trapped in the new galaxy, Thrawn and Ezra returning to the original Star Wars galaxy, and Baylan discovering large statues of the Mortis gods, powerful Force-wielders introduced in The Clone Wars. Filoni hoped the statues would still be a striking image for viewers who had not seen the animated series. He had ideas for continuing the story, but if that did not happen he was at least happy to have Ezra return to the main galaxy by the end of the season. In the season's last scene, Anakin appears as a Force ghost watching over Ahsoka and Sabine. Filoni said Anakin was always watching over Ahsoka but she was not able to see him until her transformation in the fifth episode. This scene depicts the season's master and apprentices theme by featuring three generations of Jedi—Anakin, Ahsoka, and Sabine—in one shot.

=== Casting ===
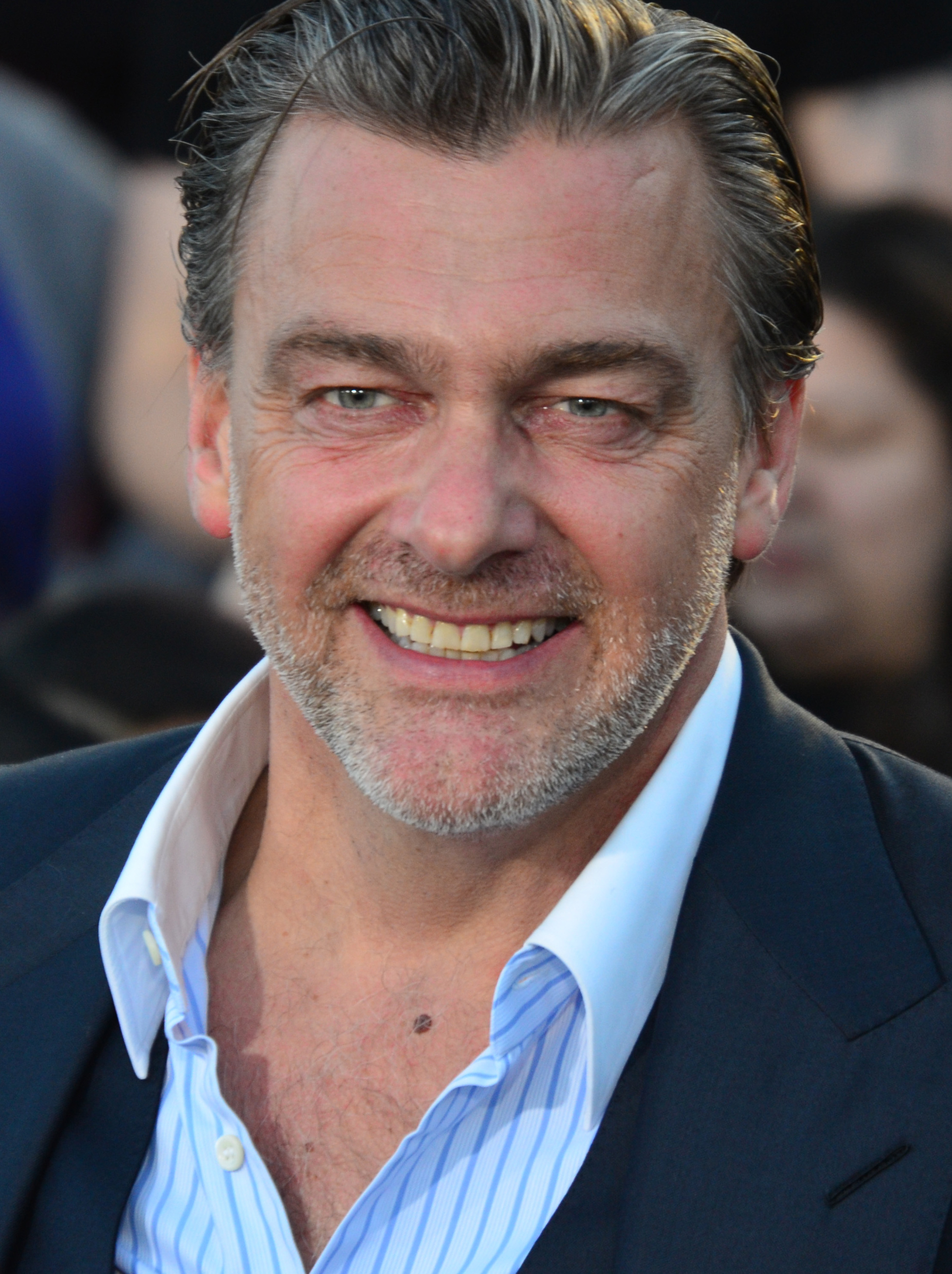
Ray Stevenson played fallen Jedi Baylan Skoll in the season. The first episode is dedicated to Stevenson, who died in May 2023.

Rosario Dawson was confirmed to be returning as Ahsoka Tano from The Mandalorian with Ahsoka's announcement in December 2020; Dawson took over from Ashley Eckstein, who voiced Ahsoka in the animated shows. By August 2021, Lucasfilm was looking for an actress to co-star as Sabine Wren, who was voiced by Tiya Sircar in Rebels, and Dawson had acknowledged rumors that Ezra Bridger and Thrawn would be in the series. Christensen was set to return as Anakin in October. The next month, Natasha Liu Bordizzo was cast as Sabine, and Ivanna Sakhno joined the cast. Mary Elizabeth Winstead was added in January 2022, and Ray Stevenson joined the next month after voicing Gar Saxon in Rebels and The Clone Wars.

At Star Wars Celebration Anaheim in May 2022, Bordizzo was officially announced as Sabine while Hera and Chopper were confirmed to be returning from Rebels. Bordizzo auditioned with a scene from the film Top Gun (1986) and a scene that reminded her of Star Wars character Han Solo. She was surprised to get an offer to star in the series based directly on her self-tape audition. In September, Eman Esfandi was cast as Ezra, who was voiced by Taylor Gray in Rebels. Esfandi was not a Star Wars fan, but told his agent and manager six months before auditioning that he was confident that he was the right person to portray Ezra. Esfandi auditioned for the character, codenamed "Riz", using the same Top Gun scene, and was offered the role a day later based solely on his self-tape, just like Bordizzo. Mena Massoud also auditioned for Ezra after being suggested by fans and being rumored to be cast as the character for over a year.

Winstead—whose husband Ewan McGregor stars as the Star Wars character Obi-Wan Kenobi—was revealed to be portraying Hera at Star Wars Celebration London in April 2023, replacing Rebels voice actress Vanessa Marshall. Winstead said it was a luxury to be able to refer to Rebels for her portrayal. Also revealed at Celebration London where character names for Sakhno (Shin Hati) and Stevenson (Baylan Skoll), and the return of several other Star Wars actors: Inosanto reprised her role as Morgan Elsbeth from The Mandalorian, Genevieve O'Reilly returned as Mon Mothma from the films and the series Andor (2022–2025), David Tennant again voiced the droid Huyang as he did in The Clone Wars, and Lars Mikkelsen reprised his role as Thrawn from Rebels. Filoni first hinted to Mikkelsen that he could reprise his role in live-action when the actor finished his voice work for Rebels, but it was not until a year-and-a-half later when Filoni contacted him about appearing in Ahsoka. Mikkelsen's role in the series was kept a secret until the announcement, with Mikkelsen repeatedly denying his involvement before then.

Later in April 2023, Wes Chatham was revealed to be appearing as Thrawn's "right-hand man", Captain Enoch. The third episode introduces Evan Whitten as Jacen Syndulla, the son of Hera and Kanan. For flashbacks to the Clone Wars in the fifth episode, Ariana Greenblatt portrays a young Ahsoka and Temuera Morrison voices Captain Rex, reprising his role as the clone troopers from the Star Wars films. In the seventh episode, Anthony Daniels reprises his Star Wars film and television role as the droid C-3PO. Additionally, Paul Sun-Hyung Lee reprises his role as Captain Carson Teva from The Mandalorian and The Book of Boba Fett; the Mandalorian's on-set double from those series, Brendan Wayne, appears as Lieutenant Lander; Clancy Brown portrays Ryder Azadi, reprising his voice role from Rebels; Vinny Thomas appears as Jai Kell, who was voiced by Dante Basco in Rebels; Nelson Lee plays Senator Hamato Xiono, who was introduced in the animated series Star Wars Resistance (2018–2020) voiced by Tzi Ma; and Elden Bennett appears as Star Wars film character Admiral Ackbar. Sam Witwer, who has voiced numerous characters in various Star Wars projects, provided additional voices for the season, and Filoni provided the voice for Chopper as he did in Rebels.

Rebels character Zeb was introduced to the live-action series with a brief appearance in the third season of The Mandalorian, created through motion capture and visual effects with Rebels voice actor Steve Blum reprising his role. Zeb was subsequently not included in the first season of Ahsoka. Lyvie Scott at Inverse speculated that this was due to the visual effects requirements for the character and felt his Mandalorian appearance was being used to explain his absence in Ahsoka. Kanan was also not brought back from Rebels due to the character's death, but an edited picture of voice actor Freddie Prinze Jr. was used as an on-set picture of Kanan.

=== Design ===
Production designers Andrew L. Jones and Doug Chiang returned from The Mandalorian and The Book of Boba Fett, as did costume designer Shawna Trpcic who died soon after the season was released. Prop master Josh Roth was responsible for the lightsabers. As with the previous live-action Star Wars series, the lightsaber hilts were connected to glowing tubes to create on-set interactive lighting. Filoni felt some of the previous series had taken the lightsaber brightness too far and wanted the light levels in Ahsoka to be closer to those in the Star Wars films. He designed Ahsoka's lightsaber hilts to be slimmer than the others, comparing them to shoto and katana, but this led to issues fitting the batteries for the interactive lighting inside the hilt. The solution for The Mandalorian was to hide the batteries in Dawson's sleeves, but this was not practical for Ahsoka considering the amount of fighting the character does throughout the season. They were able to improve the technology so the batteries would fit inside the slimmer hilts instead. The lightsaber blades for Baylan and Shin are more orange than the red that is traditionally used for Star Wars antagonists, which Filoni said was an indication that the characters are not strictly villains. Their color is based on the way Darth Vader's lightsaber would fluctuate between red and orange in some scenes of the original Star Wars films (1977–1983) due to the older technology being used. Stevenson requested adjustments to Baylan's lightsaber hilt based on his understanding of the character.

Make-up and prosthetics were used to bring characters from the animated series Star Wars Rebels into live-action. Pictured here in costume are Mary Elizabeth Winstead as Hera Syndulla (top) and Lars Mikkelsen as Grand Admiral Thrawn (bottom).

Filoni said all elements of the animated characters' appearances were considered to an "unbelievable" degree when translating them into live-action. Ahsoka has orange skin, white markings on her face, and blue-and-white montrals (horns) and lekku (head tails). Filoni wanted her skin to look natural and less saturated than in the animated series, and wanted the white markings to be subtle and not look like face paint. He told Dawson not to worry about her brown eyes differing from Ahsoka's blue eyes, but Dawson chose to wear colored contact lenses which she felt made the difference between wearing cosplay versus actually portraying the character. She was disappointed to see that the prosthetic montrals and lekku were much shorter than their animated series look, but accepted Filoni's explanation that this was needed to accommodate for her fighting and stunts. New technology was developed for the series to create the montrals and lekku, allowing them to be bigger and move more realistically than in The Mandalorian and The Book of Boba Fett. Dawson called it a 3D-printed skull cap with an internal skeleton to give the lekku more fluid movement. It was difficult applying the prosthetics around Dawson's long hair in the previous series, so she considered shaving her head for Ahsoka but ultimately decided to just cut her hair shorter. It took more than three hours to apply Dawson's make-up and prosthetics for the previous series, but the team got this down to 90 minutes for Ahsoka. Hera has green skin and lekku, which took around three hours to apply to Winstead in the initial test. This was eventually reduced to an hour, which Winstead noted was a normal amount of time to get make-up applied for a series. Thrawn has blue skin and red eyes, and Mikkelsen spent two-to-three hours in make-up each day. Filoni said there was a long process selecting the correct shades of orange, green, and blue so the characters had a "sense of blood and skin". He praised the actors for committing to the extra time required for make-up and prosthetics to portray the characters.

In Rebels, Sabine is known for frequently changing her hair color and style. She begins Ahsoka with long hair that Filoni wanted to start purple and transition to orange. She then cuts her hair to be short and purple. Hair designer Maria Sandoval wanted these colors to be more muted than in the animated series, but said they were still bold enough that it would be a "chemical impossibility" for Bordizzo's hair to hold the color for the duration of filming. She instead decided to use hair dye for an initial long wig and then fabric dye for a shorter wig after the character cuts her hair. Sandoval's team spent two months testing different dyes to get the colors right. An in-between wig was created for the scene where Sabine cuts her hair, while duplicates of the shorter wig were created for Bordizza's stunt double and for scenes where Sabine is wearing her helmet. The short wig is not as short as Sabine's hair in Rebels, with Sandoval prioritizing comfort and femininity for Bordizzo. Inosanto's first scene in the series uses the same wig as The Mandalorian, but Sandoval updated the character's hair for subsequent scenes in Ahsoka. The new look combines the existing silvery gray color, which was inspired by previous depictions of the Nightsisters, with a new style that Sandoval described as a cross between the Queen of Hearts from Alice in Wonderland (1951) and Lady Tremaine from Cinderella (1950). Thrawn's black hair is a wig because Mikkelsen did not have the right hairline for the character. Sandoval added some gray hairs to reflect the difficult environment Thrawn has been in since the end of Rebels, but kept his hair looking "composed" because the character would not let himself appear "shaggy". Sandoval closely studied Star Wars: Episode III – Revenge of the Sith (2005) to replicate Christensen's mullet hairstyle from that film. For the Clone Wars flashbacks she wanted to show what Christensen's hair would realistically look like if it grew from its appearance in Attack of the Clones to the Revenge of the Sith look, rather than directly adapt the "straighter and sort of chunkier" style seen in The Clone Wars.

Legacy Effects returned from The Mandalorian to create puppets and animatronics for the season, including Sabine's loth-cat which is a cat-like creature native to the planet Lothal. Huyang and Chopper were also created as animatronics. The season prominently features the purrgil (also known as "space whales") from Rebels after they made a brief appearance in the third season of The Mandalorian. New creatures introduced on Peridea include howlers—reptilian wolf-horse hybrids—and the bug-like Noti people who have shells that can be mistaken for rocks. Creatures called howlers, with a more reptilian design, previously appeared in the Star Wars: Jedi Knight EU video games (1995–2003). Unlike previous live-action Star Wars series, this season begins with an opening crawl similar to the ones that are reserved for the main Star Wars films. The crawl for Ahsoka is differentiated from the films by red text and simpler formatting. The end credits sequence is inspired by the star map and its planetarium-like projections. The sequence follows a gold line as it moves between different planets and star systems from throughout the franchise, including Lothal and Mandalore. It ends with multiple gold lines converging on Peridea. Stylized loth-wolves and purrgil are shown around Lothal and Seatos, respectively.

=== Filming ===
The season was produced with visual effects studio Industrial Light & Magic's StageCraft virtual production technology, which was developed for The Mandalorian. This involves filming on a "volume" set surrounded by a circular LED video wall that digital backgrounds can be displayed on in real-time. With his experience using virtual production on The Mandalorian and The Book of Boba Fett, Filoni felt he had a good handle on when the technology was right to be used and when traditional blue screen stages or outdoor locations needed to be used instead. Filoni's approach to filmmaking, based on his background in animation production, was to previsualize each episode ahead of time so he could see and work on a version of them before filming began. Filoni, the other directors, and cinematographers Eric Steelberg and Quyen Tran spent eight months creating and editing previsualizations of each episode using virtual reality cameras and headsets. The first table reads with the cast were recorded and added to the previsualizations, which Dawson described as "mini episodes".

The directors and cinematographers discussed the approaches to The Mandalorian, The Book of Boba Fett, and Obi-Wan Kenobi so Ahsoka could feel like it takes place in the same universe as those series but also stand apart. Steelberg's main influences were the original Star Wars film trilogy, but he also discussed the works of Kurosawa with Filoni. The flashbacks to the Clone Wars in the fifth episode were filmed with smoke effects and red lights to create a more abstract feeling, which Filoni was inspired for by the Kurosawa film Kagemusha (1980). There were elements of Rebels that they wanted to replicate, including the shot-for-shot recreation of that series' epilogue for the end of the second episode. A lot of testing was done to ensure the different colored make-up and hair would show correctly on camera, especially when different colored characters are together.

Principal photography began on May 9, 2022, at Manhattan Beach Studios in Los Angeles, California. Filming took place under the working title Stormcrow, which is a reference to Gandalf the Grey from The Lord of the Rings. Production took place on the different directors' episodes simultaneously, with two full crews working at the same time on some days. Tennant's pre-recorded dialogue was played on set for the other actors to perform against. Dawson's favorite day of filming was when Ahsoka voice actress Ashley Eckstein visited the set. Ming Qiu, a stunt performer on The Mandalorian and The Book of Boba Fett, was the stunt coordinator for the season. Dawson, Bordizzo, and Esfandi spent months training for their lightsaber fights. Each fight was planned to further the story and character development. Filoni wanted Baylan's fighting style to be like a medieval knight, wielding his lightsaber like a claymore. Ramsey felt this suited Stevenson's physicality and differentiated him from the Jedi characters. Inosanto, the daughter and goddaughter of famous martial artists and actors Dan Inosanto and Bruce Lee, respectively, was hired for The Mandalorian because of her martial arts background, specifically to fight Dawson's Ahsoka. She said there was a "long, involved fight scene" between the two characters in Ahsoka. Filming for some scenes on Peridea took place on outside stages, while the planet's landscapes were created using footage from the Coigach and Assynt areas of Scotland. The last shot of the series for Esfandi was filmed on the second-last day of production. Esfandi, who grew a beard to portray Ezra in exile, waited until the end of the shoot and receiving confirmation that he was not needed for reshoots before shaving his beard to portray a younger Ezra. He was filmed against a green screen to be added as an old hologram that Sabine watches. Filming lasted six months and wrapped in October 2022.

=== Music ===
At Star Wars Celebration London, Kevin Kiner was revealed to be composing the score for Ahsoka after doing so for The Clone Wars, Rebels, The Bad Batch (2021–2024), and Tales of the Jedi (2022). As with the animated series, Kiner collaborated with his children Sean and Deana on the score, and said it would have been impossible to create the five hours of music required for the season on his own. David Glen Russell also provided additional music. After composing more music for the franchise than any other composer, working on over 200 television episodes across more than 16 years, Kevin said it was still a challenge to balance honoring Star Wars film composer John Williams with not directly copying him. They used some of Williams's themes from the films for specific moments, including the Force theme; the themes for Anakin and Darth Vader; and both the main Star Wars fanfare and Princess Leia's theme for the C-3PO scene. They also studied the composers who inspired Williams, including Erich Wolfgang Korngold, Sergei Rachmaninoff, and Igor Stravinsky.

The first theme Kevin wrote for Star Wars was Ahsoka's theme, which he had used for all of the character's appearances since the start of The Clone Wars. For Tales of the Jedi, which Filoni wanted to be an homage to the works of Studio Ghibli and other Japanese cinema, Sean and Deana created a new variation of Ahsoka's theme inspired by the music of samurai films. They said this was Ahsoka's rōnin motif, which combines a pulsing cello with Kevin's original Ahsoka melody. Kevin felt this variation of the theme fit well with Dawson's more mature portrayal of Ahsoka, and they expanded on the idea as well as the Japanese influences for Ahsoka. They also brought back their themes from Rebels, including for Sabine, Hera, Ezra, and Thrawn. Filoni encouraged them not to use the themes as often as they initially wanted to because he felt the music was getting in the way of some scenes. For example, when Thrawn arrives in the sixth episode, the Kiners originally intended to use a full rendition of his theme played on an organ. Filoni felt this was the wrong approach due to the character being in a different state compared to his role in Rebels. He also wanted to have a scarier introduction for viewers who did not see Rebels. Trying to match the visuals of Thrawn's dilapidated Star Destroyer and army, the composers slowed down the music, distorted the organ sounds, and made the score more "atmospheric". For the flashbacks to the Clone Wars in the fifth episode, the Kiners included references to their synthesizer music from the final season of The Clone Wars, including the track "Burying the Dead". Sean used the Chinese guzheng string instrument to represent the metaphysical elements of the World Between Worlds.

External audio
- Kevin Kiner – Ahsoka – End Credits (From "Ahsoka"/Visualizer Video) presents composer Kevin Kiner's end credits track for the season, YouTube audio/visualization video from DisneyMusicVevo's channel

New themes for the season represent Baylan, Shin, Morgan and the Nightsister witches, and the New Republic. Baylan's theme prominently features the piano, which is rare for Star Wars music and was inspired by Rachmaninoff. The melody is a variation on the medieval chant "Dies irae", but played by an orchestra with a "heavy metal sensibility". The Kiners were particularly happy with the musical interactions between the themes for Baylan and Shin. The New Republic theme is more similar to Williams's style of music, and primarily has a positive sound, but the composers also included some subtle darkness to foreshadow the fall of the New Republic later in the franchise's timeline. They originally planned to have different music over the end credits of each episode, but found this to be impractical. Instead, the end credits track combines different themes for the season into one, starting with the rōnin variation of Ahsoka's theme. Inspired by the imagery of the end credits sequence, the composers wrote a new "celestial" motif that is included in the track. Feeling this was too good to just have in the credits, it became a recurring motif in the score. It is used for scenes with the purrgil, and for the star map that points to the new galaxy. Each episode's opening title card is accompanied by a different flute performance by Deana, who learned to play various flutes for the season. An alto flute is used for scenes with the howler.

The orchestra was recorded on the Newman Scoring Stage at Fox Studios in Los Angeles. This was a change from the animated series, which were recorded overseas, and allowed the composers to interact with the musicians as episodes were being recorded. They incorporated feedback from the musicians for early episodes when composing the score for later episodes. The in-universe song "Igyah Kah" that Sabine listens to in the first episode was co-written by Kevin and Deana Kiner, Noah Gorelick, and The Mandalorian composer Ludwig Göransson. The composers initially tried to make the song sound alien, before realizing that it just needed to be a "banger" with a punk rock style. Filoni encouraged them to "really go for it" with the song, and Göransson suggested that Sabine's theme be incorporated into it. The lyrics of the song are influenced by the Tagalog language, which is spoken by Kevin Kiner's wife who is from the Philippines. The vocals were provided by Sarah Tudzin from the band Illuminati Hotties, who Deana is friends with and had played on tour alongside.

Walt Disney Records released two soundtrack albums featuring the season's score: the first volume, covering music from the first four episodes including the song "Igyah Kah", was released digitally on September 15, 2023, while a second volume, covering music from the final four episodes, was released digitally on October 6. All music by Kevin Kiner except where noted:

Ahsoka – Vol. 1 (Episodes 1–4) [Original Soundtrack]
No.	Title	Artist(s)	Length
1.	"The Update"		4:50
2.	"Master and Apprentice"		2:20
3.	"The Map"		5:18
4.	"Assassin Ambush"		2:37
5.	"The New Republic"		4:59
6.	"Where Is Sabine?"		1:36
7.	"Igyah Kah"	Kevin Kiner & Sarah Tudzin	2:51
8.	"Ezra's Recording"		2:25
9.	"Witch Ruins"		2:36
10.	"Should Have Been a Good Jedi"		5:43
11.	"Like So Many Jedi"		2:38
12.	"Studying the Orb"		4:26
13.	"Ahsoka and Hera"		2:01
14.	"Shin and Sabine"		4:20
15.	"Ahsoka – End Credits"		3:45
16.	"Secrets of the Map"		1:25
17.	"Done Enough"		1:16
18.	"Opening the Map"		2:10
19.	"Searching the Room"		2:31
20.	"Bypass"		2:58
21.	"Morgan and Baylan"		4:42
22.	"Corellian Shipyard"		6:06
23.	"Loyalists"		1:34
24.	"Sabine's Armor"		5:46
25.	"The Eye"		2:03
26.	"Enemies Are Multiplying"		1:27
27.	"More Than Just Your Eyes"		3:44
28.	"Briefing the Senators"		3:14
29.	"Not Gifted"		2:25
30.	"You Don't Know That"		5:36
31.	"I Shall Deal with Them"		3:06
32.	"Stepping Out"		2:14
33.	"The Whale Pod"		3:21
34.	"Hunt Them Down"		2:02
35.	"Not the Time for a Lesson"		1:01
36.	"Can I Count on You?"		3:18
37.	"Move In"		2:56
38.	"Huyang Cuts the Power"		1:32
39.	"Watch Me"		2:19
40.	"Meet Up with Baylan"		2:23
41.	"Fight in the Woods"		3:53
42.	"Ahsoka and Baylan"		4:06
43.	"Do It"		3:12
44.	"Can't Follow Us"		5:24
45.	"Something Familiar"		0:55
46.	"Igyah Kah (Demo)"	Kevin Kiner & Sarah Tudzin	2:41
Total length:			2:23:00

Ahsoka – Vol. 2 (Episodes 5–8) [Original Soundtrack]
No.	Title	Length
1.	"Death and Destruction"	1:48
2.	"Searching"	4:10
3.	"A Chance"	1:37
4.	"I Can Feel It"	3:42
5.	"From the Mist"	2:34
6.	"Teaching You How to Lead"	4:15
7.	"Searching for the Shoreline"	1:05
8.	"You're a Warrior Now"	3:59
9.	"Floating"	4:12
10.	"Awakening"	2:16
11.	"Listening to the Force"	3:08
12.	"The Space Whales"	4:49
13.	"Communing"	1:47
14.	"The Hyperspace Jump"	3:12
15.	"Loyalists (Extended Version)"	5:17
16.	"Prepare for the Worst"	1:11
17.	"Far, Far Away"	0:34
18.	"To the Surface"	4:56
19.	"Something Wicked"	3:30
20.	"Baylan's Plans"	3:15
21.	"Grand Admiral Thrawn"	5:52
22.	"Sabine Rides Off"	2:24
23.	"Stranded or Killed"	2:14
24.	"Coward"	2:12
25.	"That's a Rock"	2:46
26.	"I See Bandits"	2:39
27.	"It Worked, Didn't It?"	4:29
28.	"Another Is Coming"	1:55
29.	"Thrawn's Arrival"	3:47
30.	"Primary Objective"	1:36
31.	"Senate Hearing"	1:41
32.	"Don't Be Afraid"	2:14
33.	"Field of Bones"	5:50
34.	"Getting Home"	3:18
35.	"They're All Connected"	1:44
36.	"On Her Own"	3:17
37.	"Circle Up"	2:31
38.	"Not This Again"	2:45
39.	"Baylan's Decision"	3:16
40.	"What I See"	3:37
41.	"Clearly I Was Wrong"	2:47
42.	"It's Complicated"	1:27
43.	"Never Again"	5:27
44.	"I Have a System"	3:14
45.	"I'll Be There for You"	2:22
46.	"Only If We Let It"	1:41
47.	"Prepare"	1:27
48.	"Rain Hellfire"	2:47
49.	"This Is New"	2:02
50.	"I Understand"	1:37
51.	"I'll Handle This"	2:08
52.	"Use the Force"	2:03
53.	"What Was Required"	2:45
54.	"Open Fire"	1:19
55.	"A Ronin"	2:17
56.	"Epilogue Part I"	3:19
57.	"Epilogue Part II"	5:06
Total length:		2:45:00

== Marketing ==
Filoni and Favreau promoted the series at Star Wars Celebration Anaheim on May 26, 2022, during a panel for Lucasfilm. Dawson appeared in full costume via video message from the series' set, before she appeared in person on May 28 at a panel for The Mandalorian and The Book of Boba Fett. That panel included Filoni, Favreau, Bordizzo, and Chopper, and showed footage from the first three weeks of filming. Filoni, Favreau, Dawson, and Bordizzo debuted the first trailer for the series at Star Wars Celebration London on April 7, 2023, with additional footage and the confirmation of Mikkelsen's casting as Thrawn coming the following day. A featurette titled Master & Apprentice: A Special Look at Ahsoka, focusing on mentor-student relationships in Star Wars as well as the real-life relationship between George Lucas and Dave Filoni, was released in August.

== Release ==
=== Streaming and theatrical ===
The first two episodes of the season premiered on Disney+ on August 22, 2023, at 9 p.m. Eastern Time. The other six episodes were released weekly on Tuesdays at that same time, until October 3. The season was originally scheduled to premiere on August 23 and be released on Wednesdays at 3 a.m. Eastern Time, but its release schedule was changed a week before it premiered. The first episode is dedicated to Stevenson who died in May 2023. Fan screenings for the fifth episode were held on September 12, the day it was released on Disney+, in ten theaters around the U.S. as well as at an event in the UK hosted by Empire.

=== Home media ===
The season was released on Ultra HD Blu-ray on December 3, 2024, with SteelBook packaging featuring art by Attila Szarka. The release includes concept art cards and several bonus featurettes: Ahsoka: Legacy, which explores the making of the series; Path of the Apprentice, focusing on Anakin and Ahsoka; Ghosts of the Past which is about Ahsoka's allies; and Darkness Rising which is about the villains.

== Reception ==
=== Viewership ===
According to Whip Media, which tracks viewership data for the 25 million worldwide users of its TV Time app, Ahsoka was the most anticipated new series of August 2023. Disney and Lucasfilm announced that the first episode had 14 million views in the five days following its release, making it the most watched title on Disney+ during the week of its launch. Disney defined views as total stream time divided by runtime, which The Hollywood Reporter equated to 784 million minutes of viewing. Analytics company Samba TV, which gathers viewership data from certain Smart TVs and content providers, reported that the first episode was viewed by 1.2 million households over its first five days. That is on par with their estimates for the premiere of Andor's first season, but 50 percent lower than Obi-Wan Kenobi and 29 percent lower than the third season of The Mandalorian.

Whip Media calculated that Ahsoka was the second-highest original streaming series for U.S. viewership during its first two weeks of release, behind Hulu's Only Murders in the Building. It topped the chart for the rest of the season. JustWatch, a guide to streaming content with access to data from more than 20 million users around the world, estimated that Ahsoka was the second-most watched streaming series in the U.S. for the week ending September 3, behind Netflix's One Piece. It remained in the site's top five for the rest of the season's release, finishing in third behind Amazon Prime Video's Gen V and Only Murders in the Building. Nielsen Media Research, which records streaming viewership on U.S. television screens, estimated that the first two episodes of Ahsoka were watched for 829 million minutes during its first five days. This put it second on the list of original series for the week, behind Netflix's Who Is Erin Carter?. It was above the premieres for Andor (624 million minutes) and the third season of The Mandalorian (823 million minutes) but below Obi-Wan Kenobi (1.03 billion minutes). The series dropped down the list for the following weeks, but remained in the top 10 for each episode. It returned to second place for the week of the finale, behind Netflix's Love Is Blind, with 575 million minutes viewed.

=== Critical response ===
Ahsoka season 1: Critical reception by episode
Percentage of positive critics' reviews tracked by the website Rotten Tomatoes

The season received generally positive reviews, with particular praise going to the performances of Dawson and Stevenson. The slow pacing received criticism, along with some of the visuals and action sequences. On review aggregator Rotten Tomatoes, 85% of 271 critics gave the season a positive review and the average of rated reviews was 7.4 out of 10. The critics consensus reads, "Elevated by Rosario Dawson's strong performance in the title role and a solid story that balances new and old elements of the Star Wars saga, Ahsoka is a must-watch for fans of the franchise." Metacritic, which uses a weighted average, assigned a score of 68 out of 100 based on 25 critics, indicating "generally favorable" reviews.

=== Accolades ===
Christensen and Inosanto were named honorable mentions for TVLine's "Performer of the Week", for their respective performances in "Part Five: Shadow Warrior" and "Part Eight: The Jedi, the Witch, and the Warlord". Ahsoka was awarded the Seal of Female Empowerment in Entertainment by the Critics Choice Association after receiving a perfect score when compared to their criteria.

Year	Award	Category	Nominee(s)	Result	Ref.
2024	American Cinema Editors	Best Edited Drama Series	Dana E. Glauberman (for "Part Four: Fallen Jedi")	Nominated	
2024	Annie Awards	Outstanding Achievement for Character Animation in a Live Action Production	Rick O'Connor, Mike Beaulieu, Stewart Alves, Kevin Reuter, and Wai Kit Wan	Nominated	
2024	Astra TV Awards	Best Streaming Drama Series	Ahsoka	Nominated	
2024	Astra TV Awards	Best Actress in a Streaming Drama Series	Rosario Dawson	Nominated	
2024	Astra TV Awards	Best Supporting Actress in a Streaming Drama Series	Mary Elizabeth Winstead	Nominated	
2024	Astra TV Awards	Best Directing in a Streaming Drama Series	Dave Filoni (for "Part Five: Shadow Warrior")	Nominated	
2024	Black Reel TV Awards	Outstanding Lead Performance in a Drama Series	Rosario Dawson	Nominated	
2024	Costume Designers Guild Awards	Excellence in Sci-Fi/Fantasy Television	Shawna Trpcic (for "Part Eight: The Jedi, the Witch, and the Warlord")	Won	
2024	Critics' Choice Super Awards	Best Science Fiction/Fantasy Series	Ahsoka	Nominated	
2024	Critics' Choice Super Awards	Best Superhero Series	Ahsoka	Nominated	
2024	Critics' Choice Super Awards	Best Actress in a Science Fiction/Fantasy Series	Rosario Dawson	Nominated	
2024	Critics' Choice Super Awards	Best Actress in a Superhero Series	Rosario Dawson	Nominated	
2024	Critics' Choice Super Awards	Best Villain in a Series	Lars Mikkelsen	Nominated	
2024	Golden Reel Awards	Outstanding Achievement in Sound Editing – Broadcast Long Form Effects and Foley	Bonnie Wild, Matthew Wood, David Acord, Kimberly Patrick, Tim Farrell, Joel Raabe, Shelley Roden, Ronni Brown, and Heikki Kossi (for "Part Four: Fallen Jedi")	Nominated	
2024	Hollywood Professional Association Awards	Outstanding Editing – Episode or Non-Theatrical Feature (Over 30 Minutes)	Dana E. Glauberman (for "Part Four: Fallen Jedi")	Nominated	
2024	Hollywood Professional Association Awards	Outstanding Editing – Episode or Non-Theatrical Feature (Over 30 Minutes)	James D. Wilcox (for "Part Six: Far, Far Away")	Won (Note: Tied with Katie Weiland for the House of the Dragon episode "The Red Dragon and the Gold".)	
2024	ICG Publicists Awards	Maxwell Weinberg Award for Television Publicity Campaign	Ahsoka	Won	
2024	International Film Music Critics Association Awards	Best Original Score for Television	Ahsoka (music by Kevin Kiner)	Nominated	
2024	Kids' Choice Awards	Favorite Female TV Star (Family)	Rosario Dawson	Nominated	
2024	Make-Up Artists and Hair Stylists Guild Awards	Best Period and /or Character Makeup	Alexei Dmitriew, Cristina Waltz, Alex Perrone, and Cale Thomas	Nominated	
2024	Make-Up Artists and Hair Stylists Guild Awards	Best Special Makeup Effects	Alexei Dmitriew, Cristina Waltz, Ana Gabriela Quinonez, and Ian Goodwin	Nominated	
2024	People's Choice Awards	Sci-Fi/Fantasy Show of the Year	Ahsoka	Nominated	
2024	People's Choice Awards	Female TV Star of the Year	Rosario Dawson	Nominated	
2024	Primetime Creative Arts Emmy Awards	Outstanding Fantasy/Sci-Fi Costumes	Shawna Trpcic, Elissa Alcala, and Devon Patterson (for "Part Eight: The Jedi, the Witch, and the Warlord")	Won	
2024	Primetime Creative Arts Emmy Awards	Outstanding Period or Fantasy/Sci-Fi Hairstyling	Maria Sandoval, Ashleigh Childers, Sallie Ciganovich, Marc Mapile, and Alyn Topper (for "Part One: Master and Apprentice")	Nominated	
2024	Primetime Creative Arts Emmy Awards	Outstanding Prosthetic Makeup	Alexei Dmitriew, Cristina Waltz, Ana Gabriela Quinonez Urrego, J. Alan Scott, Ian Goodwin, Cale Thomas, Alex Perrone, and Scott Stoddard (for "Part Eight: The Jedi, the Witch, and the Warlord")	Nominated	
2024	Primetime Creative Arts Emmy Awards	Outstanding Sound Editing for a Comedy or Drama Series (Half-Hour) and Animation	Matthew Wood, Bonnie Wild, David Acord, James Spencer, Vanessa Lapato, Stephanie McNally, Trey Turner, Kimberly Patrick, Tim Farrell, Joel Raabe, Chris Tergesen, Ronni Brown, Heikki Kossi, and Shelley Roden (for "Part Four: Fallen Jedi")	Nominated	
2024	Primetime Creative Arts Emmy Awards	Outstanding Special Visual Effects	Richard Bluff, Jakris Smittant, Paul Kavanagh, TC Harrison, Scott Fisher, Enrico Damm, Justin van der Lek, Rick O'Connor, and J. Alan Scott	Nominated	
2024	Screen Actors Guild Awards	Outstanding Performance by a Stunt Ensemble in a Television Series	Ahsoka	Nominated	
2024	Society of Composers & Lyricists Awards	Outstanding Original Title Sequence for a Television Production	Kevin Kiner	Nominated	
2024	Visual Effects Society Awards	Outstanding Visual Effects in a Photoreal Episode	Richard Bluff, Jakris Smittant, Paul Kavanagh, Enrico Damm, and Scott Fisher (for "Part Seven: Dreams and Madness")	Nominated	
2025	Saturn Awards	Best Science Fiction Television Series	Ahsoka	Nominated	
2025	Saturn Awards	Best Actress in a Television Series	Rosario Dawson	Won	
