= Star Wars: Ahsoka season 2 =

Season of television series

Ahsoka
- Season 2
- Promotional poster
- Showrunner: Dave Filoni
- Starring: Rosario Dawson; Natasha Liu Bordizzo; Mary Elizabeth Winstead; Ivanna Sakhno; Eman Esfandi; Hayden Christensen; Ariana Greenblatt; Lars Mikkelsen; Rory McCann

Release
- Original network: Disney+

Season chronology
- ← Previous; Season 1

The second season of the American television series Ahsoka is an upcoming part of the Star Wars franchise, taking place in the same timeframe as the series The Mandalorian (2019–2023) after the events of the film Return of the Jedi (1983). It follows Ahsoka Tano and her Jedi apprentice Sabine Wren as they are stranded in another galaxy, while Grand Admiral Thrawn leads the remnants of the Galactic Empire against the New Republic. The season is produced by Lucasfilm and Golem Creations, with Dave Filoni serving as showrunner.

Rosario Dawson stars as the title character, reprising her role from The Mandalorian. Natasha Liu Bordizzo, Mary Elizabeth Winstead, Ivanna Sakhno, Eman Esfandi, Hayden Christensen, Ariana Greenblatt, Lars Mikkelsen, and Rory McCann also star. Filoni was considering prioritizing a second season of the series over a planned The Mandalorian crossover film by November 2023, and the second season was confirmed in January 2024. McCann replaced Ray Stevenson in the role of Baylan Skoll following Stevenson's death in May 2023. Filming occurred between April and October 2025 in the United Kingdom.

The season is scheduled to premiere on the streaming service Disney+ on January 20, 2027, and consist of eight episodes.

== Episodes ==
| No. overall | No. in season | Title | Directed by | Written by | Original release date |
|---|---|---|---|---|---|
| 9 | 1 | TBA | TBA | Dave Filoni | January 20, 2027 |

The season consists of eight episodes, all written by Filoni. Bryce Dallas Howard directed two episodes, with Filoni, Jennifer Getzinger, and Anders Engström also directing.

== Cast and characters ==
=== Starring ===
- Rosario Dawson as Ahsoka Tano
  - Ariana Greenblatt as young Ahsoka
- Natasha Liu Bordizzo as Sabine Wren
- Mary Elizabeth Winstead as Hera Syndulla
- Ivanna Sakhno as Shin Hati
- Eman Esfandi as Ezra Bridger
- Hayden Christensen as Anakin Skywalker
- Lars Mikkelsen as Grand Admiral Thrawn
- Rory McCann as Baylan Skoll

=== Guests ===
- Jeryl Prescott Gallien as Aktropaw
- Jane Edwina Seymour as Lakesis
- Nelson Lee as Hamato Xiono

Other characters confirmed to be appearing in the season include: Huyang, Chopper, Enoch, Admiral Ackbar, and Garazeb "Zeb" Orrelios.

== Production ==
=== Background ===
Lucasfilm announced several spin-offs from the Star Wars series The Mandalorian (2019–2023) in December 2020, including Ahsoka. Rosario Dawson was set to reprise her role as Ahsoka Tano from The Mandalorian, having taken over from Ashley Eckstein who voiced the character in Dave Filoni's animated series Star Wars: The Clone Wars (2008–2020) and Star Wars Rebels (2014–2018). The new spin-off series were set in the same timeframe as The Mandalorian—during the 30 years between the films Return of the Jedi (1983) and Star Wars: The Force Awakens (2015)—and were planned to culminate in a "climactic story event". They were being developed by The Mandalorian creator Jon Favreau and Filoni, with Filoni creating and showrunning Ahsoka. Lucasfilm's Kathleen Kennedy, Carrie Beck, and Colin Wilson were also executive producers.

The first season of Ahsoka continued a story that Filoni established in the epilogue of Rebels, and was referred to by some fans and commentators as effectively being a fifth season of Rebels. That series ended with protagonist Ezra Bridger and antagonist Grand Admiral Thrawn being taken to an unknown location, and the epilogue showed Ahsoka joining Ezra's friend Sabine Wren to search for them. In the first season of Ahsoka, Ezra and Thrawn are found in another galaxy and return to the main Star Wars galaxy, while Ahsoka and Sabine are stranded in the other galaxy with antagonists Baylan Skoll and Shin Hati. Baylan discovers large statues of the Mortis gods–powerful Force-wielders introduced in The Clone Wars–as part of his own journey. It was initially unclear how Baylan's story would continue following the death of actor Ray Stevenson in May 2023.

=== Development ===
Ahsoka was initially reported to be a miniseries, but Disney was not listing it as such by February 2023. That April, Filoni was announced to be making a film that would serve as a culmination of the interconnected stories of The Mandalorian and its spin-offs. The film's timing would depend on future television seasons, including a possible second season of Ahsoka which was dependent on the first season's performance. When the first season was fully released in October, a second season was considered more likely to be Filoni's next project than the film. The next month, Filoni revealed that he was now chief creative officer at Lucasfilm and would be directly involved in the planning of future films and series. He was considering a second season of Ahsoka at that time, and Lucasfilm officially announced that Filoni was developing the season in January 2024. Filoni said the second season would have eight episodes, like the first, which he had written by April 2025. In September, Bryce Dallas Howard revealed that she directed two episodes of the season after previously directing for The Mandalorian and other Star Wars series. Filoni, Jennifer Getzinger, and Anders Engström also directed episodes of the season.

=== Writing ===
The season features two storylines: Ahsoka and Sabine are hunted by Shin on Peridea as part of their journey, which is connected to the Mortis gods and culminates in a confrontation with Baylan; and Thrawn leads the remnants of the Galactic Empire and his Nightsister allies against the New Republic, whose forces are led by Admiral Ackbar. Filoni said it was challenging for him to write the season after Stevenson's death. He discussed with the actor's family before deciding to recast the role of Baylan and continue his story. He explained that Baylan is "the parallel to Ahsoka in every way, a different journey for a Jedi who has been lost".

=== Casting ===
Rosario Dawson returned from the first season to star as Ahsoka Tano, alongside Natasha Liu Bordizzo as Sabine Wren, Mary Elizabeth Winstead as Hera Syndulla, Ivanna Sakhno as Shin Hati, Eman Esfandi as Ezra Bridger, Hayden Christensen as Anakin Skywalker, Ariana Greenblatt as young Ahsoka, and Lars Mikkelsen as Grand Admiral Thrawn. Rory McCann was cast to replace Stevenson as Baylan Skoll in January 2025, and his casting was confirmed that April at Star Wars Celebration Japan. Filoni said they wanted an actor who understood both the character and Stevenson, and could follow the "blueprint" that Stevenson established. He said McCann had "such respect for Ray, and his whole focus is not letting Ray down and not letting [the audience] down". McCann was previously cast as Brasso in the Star Wars television series Andor (2022–2025), but was forced to leave the role due to a knee injury and was replaced by Joplin Sibtain.

Jeryl Prescott Gallien and Jane Edwina Seymour returned from the first season as Nightsister Great Mothers Aktropaw and Lakesis, respectively. Claudia Black was also asked to reprise her role as Great Mother Klothow, but chose not to because she felt the salary offered would not allow her to maintain her responsibilities in Los Angeles as a single mother while filming the season in London. Black said she understood Disney's business decision not to meet her salary demands.

=== Design ===
Doug Chiang returned as production designer from the first season and was joined by Martin Foley. Filoni asked special effects supervisor Neal Scanlan to replicate "all the wiggles" of the original Admiral Ackbar prosthetics from Return of the Jedi. Sabine's loth-cat Murley, created with puppets and animatronics, returned from the first season alongside new loth-kittens who Filoni explained have "legs [that] aren't strong enough to walk, so they have to roll around".

=== Filming ===
Principal photography began on April 28, 2025, in the United Kingdom. Stephan Pehrsson was the cinematographer for episodes two, three, and six. A wrap party for the season was held at the end of September, with work finishing in October.

=== Music ===
Kevin Kiner returned as composer from the first season and started discussing the second season with Filoni by mid-June 2024. Filoni created a playlist of music while he was writing the season for Kiner to use as reference.

== Marketing ==
The season's announcement in January 2024 was accompanied by a sketch from Filoni featuring Ahsoka and Sabine with the Mortis gods statues, leading to speculation about the season's possible story. Filoni, Favreau, Dawson, and Christensen discussed the series during a panel at Star Wars Celebration Japan in April 2025. Though primarily focused on the making of the first season, the panel also teased what was to come in the second season ahead of the start of filming. A teaser was shown featuring concept art, still images, and a voiceover inspired by the style of the first teaser trailer for the film The Empire Strikes Back (1980).

Dawson promoted the season during Disney's upfront presentation in May 2026, where the early 2027 release window was announced and behind-the-scenes footage featuring Filoni and cast members was shown. Filoni, Dawson, Christensen, and Esfandi promoted the season at Disney's D23 convention in August, where the release date was announced and a teaser trailer debuted before being released online. Lousie Griffin, writing for Radio Times, described the teaser as "chilling". Ben Travis at Empire said the more than three year wait for the second season appeared to be worth it based on the teaser, which made the season look "gigantic and action-packed". He hoped the season would be able to deliver on the ambitious scope of the war that the teaser was promising. At /Film, Jeremy Mathai agreed that the teaser was promising a large scope and a lot of action. He said the season looked like a "serious glow-up", with the teaser indicating that several criticisms of the first season—the slow pacing, some "stodgy-looking" visuals, and "inert" action—had been addressed.

== Release ==
The season is scheduled to premiere on the streaming service Disney+ on January 20, 2027, and consist of eight episodes.
