= Star Wars: Ahsoka =

American television series

Ahsoka
- Also known as: Star Wars: Ahsoka
- Genre: Action-adventure; Science fiction; Space fantasy
- Created by: Dave Filoni
- Based on: Star Wars by George Lucas
- Showrunner: Dave Filoni
- Written by: Dave Filoni
- Starring: Rosario Dawson; Natasha Liu Bordizzo; Mary Elizabeth Winstead; Ray Stevenson; Ivanna Sakhno; Diana Lee Inosanto; David Tennant; Eman Esfandi; Evan Whitten; Genevieve O'Reilly; Hayden Christensen; Ariana Greenblatt; Lars Mikkelsen; Anthony Daniels
- Composer: Kevin Kiner
- Country of origin: United States
- Original language: English
- No. of seasons: 1
- No. of episodes: 8

Production
- Executive producers: Dave Filoni; Jon Favreau; Kathleen Kennedy; Carrie Beck; Colin Wilson
- Producer: John Bartnicki
- Production location: Los Angeles, California
- Cinematography: Eric Steelberg; Quyen Tran; Stephan Pehrsson
- Editors: Dana E. Glauberman; Rosanne Tan; James D. Wilcox
- Running time: 37–57 minutes
- Production companies: Lucasfilm; Golem Creations

Original release
- Network: Disney+
- Release: August 22, 2023 – present

Related
- Star Wars Rebels; The Mandalorian; The Book of Boba Fett; Star Wars: Skeleton Crew

Ahsoka, also known as Star Wars: Ahsoka, is an American space fantasy television series created by Dave Filoni for the streaming service Disney+. It is part of the Star Wars franchise and a spin-off from The Mandalorian (2019–2023), taking place in the same timeframe as that series and its other interconnected spin-offs after the events of the film Return of the Jedi (1983). Ahsoka follows former Jedi apprentice Ahsoka Tano and her allies as they defend the fledgling New Republic against remnants of the Galactic Empire.

Rosario Dawson stars as the title character, reprising her role from The Mandalorian. Natasha Liu Bordizzo, Mary Elizabeth Winstead, Ray Stevenson, Ivanna Sakhno, Diana Lee Inosanto, David Tennant, Eman Esfandi, Evan Whitten, Genevieve O'Reilly, Hayden Christensen, Ariana Greenblatt, Lars Mikkelsen, and Anthony Daniels also star. Ahsoka Tano was co-created by Filoni for the animated series Star Wars: The Clone Wars (2008–2020). Dawson was cast to bring her into live-action for the second season of The Mandalorian, and a spin-off series starring Dawson was announced by Lucasfilm in December 2020 with Filoni as showrunner. It serves as a continuation of the animated series Star Wars Rebels (2014–2018). In addition to Filoni, Jon Favreau, Kathleen Kennedy, and Colin Wilson returned from The Mandalorian as executive producers and were joined by Carrie Beck.

Ahsoka premiered on August 22, 2023, with the first two episodes of the first season. The other six episodes were released through October 3. The season received high viewership, generally positive reviews from critics, and several accolades including a Primetime Creative Arts Emmy Award. The second season is scheduled to premiere on January 20, 2027.

== Premise ==
After the fall of the Galactic Empire in the film Return of the Jedi (1983), former Jedi apprentice Ahsoka Tano joins with her own former apprentice, Sabine Wren, and other characters from the animated series Star Wars Rebels (2014–2018) to prevent Grand Admiral Thrawn—who is stranded in another galaxy—from returning and uniting the remnants of the Empire against the fledgling New Republic. The first season ends with Thrawn returning from the other galaxy, leaving Ahsoka and Sabine stranded there. In the second season, Ahsoka and Sabine go on a journey related to the mysterious Mortis gods and confront the fallen Jedi Baylan Skoll while Thrawn leads the Empire against the New Republic.

== Episodes ==
Seasons of Ahsoka
Season	Episodes	Originally released	
Season	Episodes	First released	Last released
1	8	August 22, 2023	October 3, 2023
2	8	January 20, 2027	TBA

=== Season 1 (2023) ===
No. overall	No. in season	Title	Directed by	Written by	Original release date
1	1	"Part One: Master and Apprentice"	Dave Filoni	Dave Filoni	August 22, 2023
2	2	"Part Two: Toil and Trouble"	Steph Green	Dave Filoni	August 22, 2023
3	3	"Part Three: Time to Fly"	Steph Green	Dave Filoni	August 29, 2023
4	4	"Part Four: Fallen Jedi"	Peter Ramsey	Dave Filoni	September 5, 2023
5	5	"Part Five: Shadow Warrior"	Dave Filoni	Dave Filoni	September 12, 2023
6	6	"Part Six: Far, Far Away"	Jennifer Getzinger	Dave Filoni	September 19, 2023
7	7	"Part Seven: Dreams and Madness"	Geeta Vasant Patel	Dave Filoni	September 26, 2023
8	8	"Part Eight: The Jedi, the Witch, and the Warlord"	Rick Famuyiwa	Dave Filoni	October 3, 2023

=== Season 2 ===
No. overall	No. in season	Title	Directed by	Written by	Original release date
9	1	TBA	TBA	Dave Filoni	January 20, 2027

== Cast and characters ==
=== Starring ===
- Rosario Dawson as Ahsoka Tano:
  The Togruta former Jedi apprentice of Anakin Skywalker. She leaves the Jedi Order in the animated series Star Wars: The Clone Wars (2008–2020), and learns that Anakin has fallen to the dark side of the Force in the follow-up animated series Star Wars Rebels (2014–2018). The repercussions of this are explored in Ahsoka, which begins with the character as a wandering rōnin similar to the main character of Akira Kurosawa's film Yojimbo (1961). Borrowing from J. R. R. Tolkien's novel The Lord of the Rings (1954–55), in which the wandering Gandalf the Grey is reborn as the wise and powerful Gandalf the White, showrunner Dave Filoni depicted Ahsoka's development as "Ahsoka the Gray" becoming "Ahsoka the White". Dawson praised The Clone Wars and Rebels voice actor Ashley Eckstein and said she was building on that animated history. She embraced the training required to replicate the animated character's fighting abilities, and the makeup and prosthetics needed to adapt the character's alien appearance; Ahsoka has orange skin, white markings on her face, and blue-and-white montrals (horns) and lekku (head tails). New technology was developed to create the montrals and lekku, allowing them to be bigger and more realistic than in previous Star Wars series.
  - Ariana Greenblatt as young Ahsoka, appearing as part of flashbacks that Ahsoka has to her time in the Clone Wars while inside the mysterious "World Between Worlds". To prepare for the role, Greenblatt watched many The Clone Wars episodes and also visited the set of Ahsoka to see Dawson's performance, hoping to combine the character's portrayal in The Clone Wars with Dawson's version.
- Natasha Liu Bordizzo as Sabine Wren:
  A Mandalorian warrior with a creative and rebellious spirit who fought the Galactic Empire in Rebels. The series reveals that Ahsoka took Sabine on as her Padawan learner after Rebels, but they parted ways when Sabine's family were killed during the purge of Mandalore. Filoni wanted to show someone training to be a Jedi who does not have a strong connection to the Force, feeling that would differentiate the story from previous Star Wars projects. Bordizzo found Sabine's challenges with learning to use the Force relatable to her own life. She watched Rebels to prepare for the role, describing it as a "memory book" for Sabine, and trained for three months to fight with a lightsaber. Bordizzo wore wigs for Sabine's colorful hair: first, a long wig that was made purple and orange with hair dye, then a short wig made purple with fabric dye.
- Mary Elizabeth Winstead as Hera Syndulla:
  A Twi'lek general of the New Republic who is the pilot of the Ghost. She fought the Empire in Rebels. Winstead described Hera as a strong leader and fighter with maternal instincts, and felt this was unique compared to the usual depiction of army generals in media as "very masculine, hard figures". She added that it was a luxury to be able to see Hera's story told in Rebels when developing her portrayal. Hera has green skin and lekku, which took around three hours to apply to Winstead in the initial test. This was eventually reduced to an hour, which Winstead noted was a normal amount of time to get make-up applied for a series.
- Ray Stevenson (season 1) and Rory McCann (season 2) as Baylan Skoll:
  A former Jedi who survived the organization's destruction during Order 66 at the end of the Clone Wars. He has deemed the Jedi Order a failure and is now searching for a new power, related to the Mortis gods from The Clone Wars, to end the cycle of destruction between the light and dark sides of the Force. Despite being an antagonist in the series, Stevenson did not consider Baylan to be a villain and debated whether he was with Filoni during filming. Filoni wanted Baylan's fighting style to be like a medieval knight, wielding his lightsaber like a claymore. Episodic director Peter Ramsey felt this suited Stevenson's physicality and differentiated him from the Jedi characters. The character is named after the wolf Sköll from Norse mythology. The series premiere is dedicated to Stevenson, who died in May 2023 after completing his work on the first season. McCann felt it was the right decision to recast the role and continue the character's story. He said his experience sword fighting on the series Game of Thrones (2011–2019) helped with his lightsaber training for the role.
- Ivanna Sakhno as Shin Hati:
  Baylan's apprentice, who he is teaching to be "something more" than a Jedi. Sakhno said Hati was calculated but impatient, and just finding her own voice in the series. She was encouraged by Filoni to help develop elements of the character's backstory. Sakhno said she and Stevenson were inseparable during filming and he had a big impact on her life. The character is named after the wolf Hati from Norse mythology.
- Diana Lee Inosanto as Morgan Elsbeth: One of the last remaining Nightsister witches of Dathomir who is allied with Grand Admiral Thrawn
- David Tennant as the voice of Huyang: A lightsaber-crafting droid that has been instructing Jedi for thousands of years
- Eman Esfandi as Ezra Bridger: A former thief from Lothal who was trained as a Jedi by Kanan Jarrus and disappeared with Thrawn at the end of Rebels
- Evan Whitten as Jacen Syndulla: The son of Hera Syndulla and Kanan Jarrus who hopes to become a Jedi like his father
- Genevieve O'Reilly as Mon Mothma: The Chancellor of the New Republic who was a leader of the Rebel Alliance
- Hayden Christensen as Anakin Skywalker / Darth Vader:
  Ahsoka Tano's former Jedi master who fell to the dark side of the Force and became the Sith lord Darth Vader, before being redeemed with his death in the film Return of the Jedi (1983). Anakin appears as a Force ghost to finish Ahsoka's training. Filoni prioritized seeing Christensen's performance over the Darth Vader costume, which is only seen in brief flashes. Filoni kept the focus in these scenes on Ahsoka's character development, feeling that Star Wars creator George Lucas had already resolved Anakin's character arc in the Star Wars films and not wanting to change that. Christensen was digitally de-aged for the role. Hair designer Maria Sandoval closely studied Star Wars: Episode III – Revenge of the Sith (2005) to replicate Christensen's mullet hairstyle from that film. For the Clone Wars flashbacks, she wanted to show what Christensen's hair would realistically look like if it grew from its appearance in Star Wars: Episode II – Attack of the Clones (2002) to the Revenge of the Sith look, rather than directly adapt the "straighter and sort of chunkier" style seen in The Clone Wars.
- Lars Mikkelsen as Grand Admiral Thrawn:
  A Chiss high-ranking officer of the Empire who is known for his tactical cunning. He has been missing for years after disappearing with Ezra Bridger at the end of Rebels. Mikkelsen said Thrawn was "always seven paces ahead of anybody else", only ruthless when he had to be, and took advantage of others' creativity. He chose not to revisit his own performance as Thrawn in Rebels, instead focusing on creating "something new". Thrawn has blue skin and red eyes, and Mikkelsen spent two-to-three hours in make-up each day. His black hair is a wig because Mikkelsen did not have the right hairline for the character.
- Anthony Daniels as C-3PO: A protocol droid who serves New Republic senator Leia Organa

=== Recurring ===
- Paul Darnell as Marrok: A Jedi-hunting Imperial Inquisitor. He is named for a lesser-known Knight of the Round Table from Arthurian legend who is turned into a werewolf.
- Dave Filoni as Chopper: Hera's astromech droid
- Nican Robinson as Vic Hawkins: An officer of the New Republic fleet
- Paul Sun-Hyung Lee as Carson Teva: A captain in the New Republic fleet
- Jeryl Prescott Gallien as Aktropaw: One of the Nightsister Great Mothers on Peridea. She is named after Atropos from Greek mythology.
- Claudia Black as Klothow: One of the Nightsister Great Mothers on Peridea. She is named after Clotho from Greek mythology.
- Jane Edwina Seymour as Lakesis: One of the Nightsister Great Mothers on Peridea. She is named after Lachesis from Greek mythology.
- Wes Chatham as Enoch: An elite Stormtrooper who is Thrawn's Captain of the Guard

=== Guests ===
- Mark Rolston as Hayle: The captain of the prisoner ship in which Morgan is being transported
- Clancy Brown as Ryder Azadi: The governor of Lothal who aided the heroes in Rebels
- Vinny Thomas as Jai Kell: A former rebel and now Lothal senator, who aided the heroes in Rebels
- Peter Jacobson as Myn Weaver: A spy for the Galactic Empire working as a regional supervisor of a Corellian shipyard
- Nelson Lee as Hamato Xiono: A senator from Hosnian Prime who does not believe that Thrawn and Ezra can be found
- Jacqueline Antaramian as Rodrigo: A senator of the New Republic
- Maurice Irvin as Mawood: A senator of the New Republic
- Brendan Wayne as Lander: A lieutenant in the New Republic fleet
- Temuera Morrison as Captain Rex: The clone captain, and later commander, of the 501st Legion who served under Anakin and Ahsoka during the Clone Wars and was an ally of the heroes in Rebels
- Elden Bennett as Admiral Ackbar: A Mon Calamari New Republic admiral

== Production ==
=== Development ===
Disney CEO Bob Iger said in February 2020 that spin-offs of the live-action Star Wars series The Mandalorian (2019–2023) were being considered, and there was potential to add characters to the series to then give them their own series. A month later, Rosario Dawson was cast as Ahsoka Tano for the second season of The Mandalorian, appearing in "Chapter 13: The Jedi" which was written and directed by executive producer Dave Filoni. Filoni co-created Ahsoka with Star Wars creator George Lucas for the animated series Star Wars: The Clone Wars (2008–2020), and later included her in his follow-up animated series Star Wars Rebels (2014–2018).

In December 2020, Lucasfilm announced several spin-off series from The Mandalorian including The Book of Boba Fett (2021) and Ahsoka, also known as Star Wars: Ahsoka. The new series were set in the same timeframe as The Mandalorian—during the 30 years between the films Return of the Jedi (1983) and Star Wars: The Force Awakens (2015)—and were planned to culminate in a "climactic story event". Filoni indicated that this would involve a conflict with the remnants of the Galactic Empire which Ahsoka helps build towards. The series were being concurrently developed by The Mandalorian creator Jon Favreau and Filoni, with Filoni creating, writing, and serving as lead producer and showrunner on Ahsoka. Lucasfilm's Kathleen Kennedy, Carrie Beck, and Colin Wilson were also set as executive producers on the series.

Ahsoka was initially reported to be a miniseries, but Disney was not listing it as such by February 2023. That April, when the series was revealed to have eight episodes, Filoni was announced to be making a film that would serve as a culmination of the interconnected stories of The Mandalorian and its spin-offs. In November, Filoni revealed that he was now chief creative officer at Lucasfilm and would be directly involved in the planning of future films and series. He was considering a second season of the series at that point, and Lucasfilm officially announced that Filoni was developing the season in January 2024, to be made before his planned film.

=== Writing ===
At the end of Rebels, protagonist Ezra Bridger is taken to an unknown location with antagonist Grand Admiral Thrawn. In an epilogue, Ahsoka joins Sabine Wren to search for Ezra, setting-up a future story that Filoni wanted to tell. He described bringing Ahsoka and Sabine together as "a unification of Clone Wars and Rebels". Following speculation and reports about the series, Filoni confirmed that Ahsoka would be continuing the story he established in the epilogue of Rebels, and would explore aspects of Ahsoka from The Clone Wars and Rebels that he had not been able to so far. When asked if the series was effectively a fifth season of Rebels, Filoni said that was "one way of looking at it" but he also saw all of his Star Wars projects as one larger story. Ahsoka takes on Sabine as her Padawan learner in the series, something Filoni had been planning for the characters since the end of Rebels. The relationships between masters and apprentices became a key theme throughout the first season, which also explores Ahsoka's relationship with her former master Anakin Skywalker.

=== Casting ===
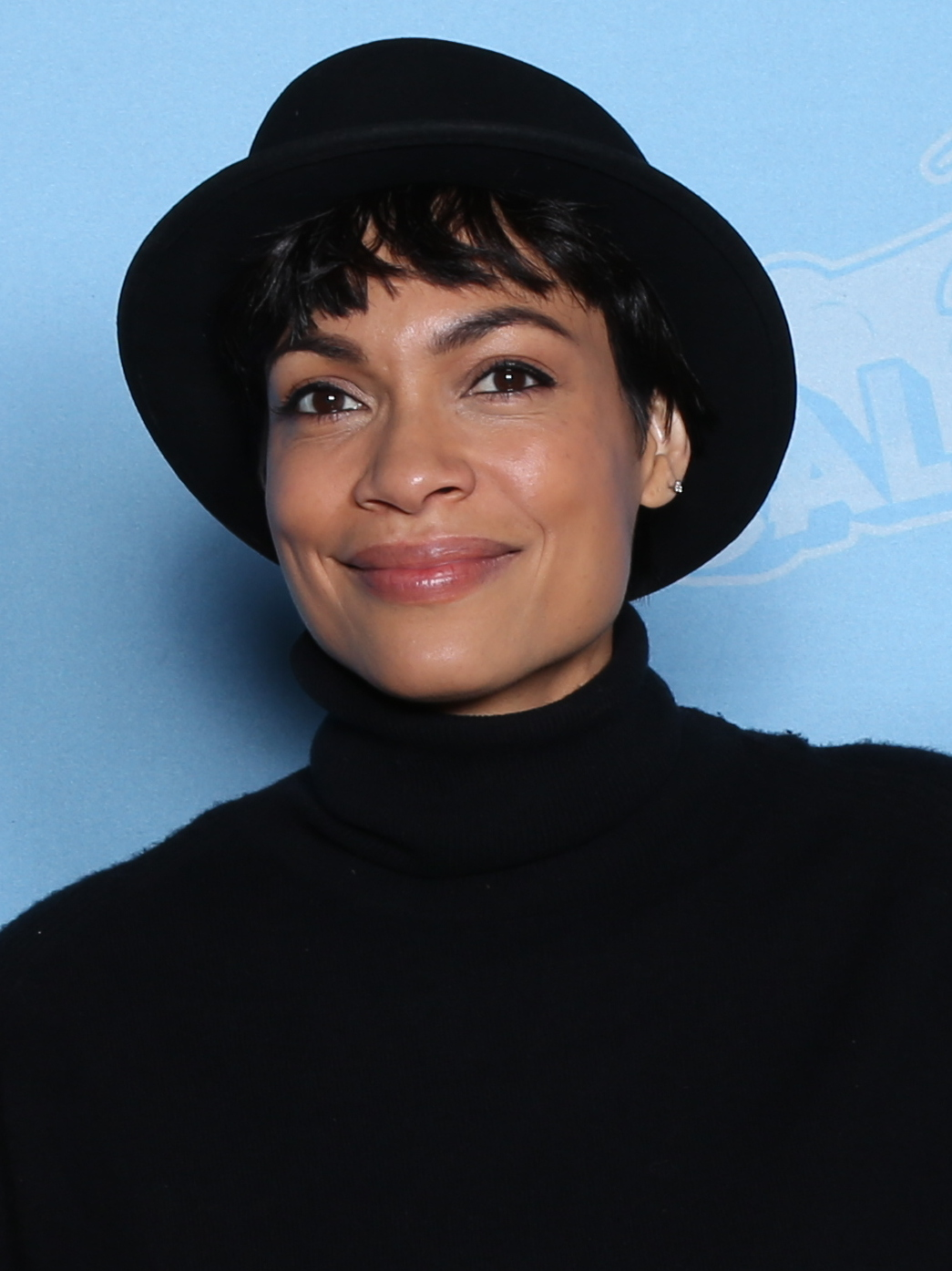
Rosario Dawson stars as Ahsoka Tano, reprising her role from The Mandalorian

Rosario Dawson was confirmed to be reprising her role as Ahsoka Tano from The Mandalorian with the series' announcement in December 2020; Ahsoka was voiced in the animated series by Ashley Eckstein. In October 2021, Hayden Christensen was set to reprise his role as Anakin from the Star Wars films, while Natasha Liu Bordizzo was cast as Sabine a month later, replacing Tiya Sircar who voiced the character in Rebels. Ivanna Sakhno was also cast in November. Mary Elizabeth Winstead was added to the cast in January 2022, and Ray Stevenson joined the next month. Stevenson previously voiced Gar Saxon in Rebels and The Clone Wars. In September, Eman Esfandi was cast as Ezra, who was voiced by Taylor Gray in Rebels.

At Star Wars Celebration London in April 2023, Winstead was revealed to be portraying Rebels character Hera Syndulla, replacing voice actress Vanessa Marshall; Sakhno and Stevenson were revealed to be playing new antagonists Shin Hati and Baylan Skoll, respectively; and several actors were announced to be reprising their roles from previous Star Wars projects: Diana Lee Inosanto as Morgan Elsbeth from The Mandalorian, Genevieve O'Reilly as Mon Mothma from the Star Wars films and the series Andor (2022–2025), David Tennant as the droid Huyang from The Clone Wars, and Lars Mikkelsen as Thrawn from Rebels. The third episode of the first season introduces Evan Whitten as Jacen Syndulla, Hera's son; Ariana Greenblatt plays a young Ahsoka for flashbacks to the Clone Wars in the fifth episode; and Anthony Daniels reprises his Star Wars film and television role as the droid C-3PO in the seventh episode.

Dawson, Bordizzo, Winstead, Sakhno, Esfandi, Christensen, Greenblatt, and Mikkelsen returned to star in the second season. In January 2025, Rory McCann was cast to replace Stevenson—who died in May 2023—as Baylan Skoll.

=== Design ===
The design leads from The Mandalorian and The Book of Boba Fett returned for Ahsoka, including production designers Andrew L. Jones and Doug Chiang, costume designer Shawna Trpcic, hair designer Maria Sandoval, and prop master Josh Roth. Trpcic died soon after the first season was released. Legacy Effects also returned to create puppets and animatronics. The first season begins with an opening crawl similar to the ones that are reserved for the main Star Wars films. The crawl for Ahsoka is differentiated from the films by red text and simpler formatting. As with the previous live-action Star Wars series, lightsaber hilts were connected to glowing tubes to create on-set interactive lighting. Filoni felt some of the previous series had taken the lightsaber brightness too far and wanted the light levels in Ahsoka to be closer to those in the Star Wars films. The technology for hiding batteries for the lighting in the lightsaber hilts was improved from The Mandalorian.

=== Filming ===
The series is produced with visual effects studio Industrial Light & Magic's StageCraft virtual production technology, which was developed for The Mandalorian. This involves filming on a "volume" set surrounded by a circular LED video wall that digital backgrounds can be displayed on in real-time. Traditional blue screen stages as well as outdoor locations are also used for some scenes. The directors and cinematographers spent eight months creating and editing previsualizations of each episode using virtual reality cameras and headsets ahead of filming. Principal photography for the first season began on May 9, 2022, at Manhattan Beach Studios in Los Angeles, California, under the working title Stormcrow. Filming lasted six months and wrapped in October 2022. Filming for the second season began on April 28, 2025, in the United Kingdom.

=== Music ===
At Star Wars Celebration London in April 2023, Kevin Kiner was revealed to be composing the score for Ahsoka after doing so for the animated series The Clone Wars, Rebels, The Bad Batch (2021–2024), and Tales of the Jedi (2022). As with the animated series, Kiner collaborated with his children Sean and Deana on the score. It combines influences from Japanese cinema, which the Kiners started leaning into for Ahsoka in Tales of the Jedi, with the more traditional sound of Star Wars film composer John Williams. In addition to Kevin's Ahsoka theme from The Clone Wars, the score includes returning themes for the main Rebels characters, and some of Williams's themes from the films for key scenes. Walt Disney Records released two soundtrack albums featuring the first season's score: the first volume was released on September 15 and the second on October 6.

== Release ==
Season	Home media release dates		
Season	Region 1	Region 2	Region 4
1	December 3, 2024	February 10, 2025	TBA

Ahsoka premiered on Disney+ on August 22, 2023, with its first two episodes. Subsequent episodes were released weekly until October 3. The second season is scheduled to premiere on January 20, 2027.

== Reception ==
=== Viewership ===
Disney and Lucasfilm announced that the first episode had 14 million views in its first five days and was the most watched title on Disney+ that week. Disney defined views as total stream time divided by runtime. Whip Media, who track viewership data for the 25 million worldwide users of their TV Time app, ranked Ahsoka as the highest or second-highest original streaming series each week of the first season's release. Nielsen Media Research, which records streaming viewership on U.S. television screens, placed Ahsoka second on its list of original series for the first season's premiere and finale weeks. The other weeks were also in the top 10.

=== Critical response ===
Critical response of Star Wars: Ahsoka
Season	Rotten Tomatoes	Metacritic
1	85% (272 reviews)	68 (25 reviews)

The review aggregator website Rotten Tomatoes reported that 85% of 272 critics gave the first season a positive review, with an average rating of 7.40 out of 10. The website's critical consensus reads, "Elevated by Rosario Dawson's strong performance in the title role and a solid story that balances new and old elements of the Star Wars saga, Ahsoka is a must-watch for fans of the franchise." Metacritic, which uses a weighted average, assigned the season a score of 68 out of 100 based on 25 critics, indicating "generally favorable" reviews. Critics commonly felt the season was a good entry in the franchise for existing Star Wars fans. The performances of Dawson and Stevenson received praise, but other performances were criticized as being "stiff" and the season's slow pacing also received criticism.

=== Accolades ===
The first season was nominated for six Primetime Creative Arts Emmy Awards (winning one), an American Cinema Editors Award, a Costume Designers Guild Award (which it won), five Critics' Choice Super Awards, two Make-Up Artists and Hair Stylists Guild Awards, two People's Choice Awards, two Saturn Awards (winning one), a Screen Actors Guild Award, and a Visual Effects Society Award, among others.

== Tie-in media ==
In February 2024, Marvel Comics announced an eight-issue comic book miniseries titled Star Wars: Ahsoka which adapts the first season of the series. Written by Rodney Barnes with art by Steven Cummings and Georges Jeanty, the miniseries debuted that July.
