= Carrie Beck =

American television producer

Carrie Beck is an American film and television executive who serves as Executive Vice President, Live Action Development & Production at Lucasfilm, a subsidiary of The Walt Disney Company. She is known for her work as an executive producer on multiple Star Wars television series released on Disney+.

== Career ==
Beck has worked in film and television development and production since the early 2000s. According to Lucasfilm, she previously worked at Dimension Films and MTV Films and later with the Sundance Institute's New Frontier Story Lab, where she focused on emerging storytelling formats and talent development.

After joining Lucasfilm, Beck became part of the studio's senior creative leadership during the expansion of the Star Wars franchise into live-action television for Disney+. Beck co-created the animated series Star Wars Rebels with Simon Kinberg and Dave Filoni. She has also served as an executive producer or co-executive producer on multiple series within the franchise.

== Credits ==
- The Mandalorian (2019–2023) – Co-executive producer
- The Book of Boba Fett (2021–2022) – Co-executive producer
- Ahsoka (2023–present) – Executive producer
- Skeleton Crew (2024–2025) – Co-executive producer
- The Mandalorian and Grogu (2026) - Executive producer
