= Rory McCann =

Scottish actor (born 1969)

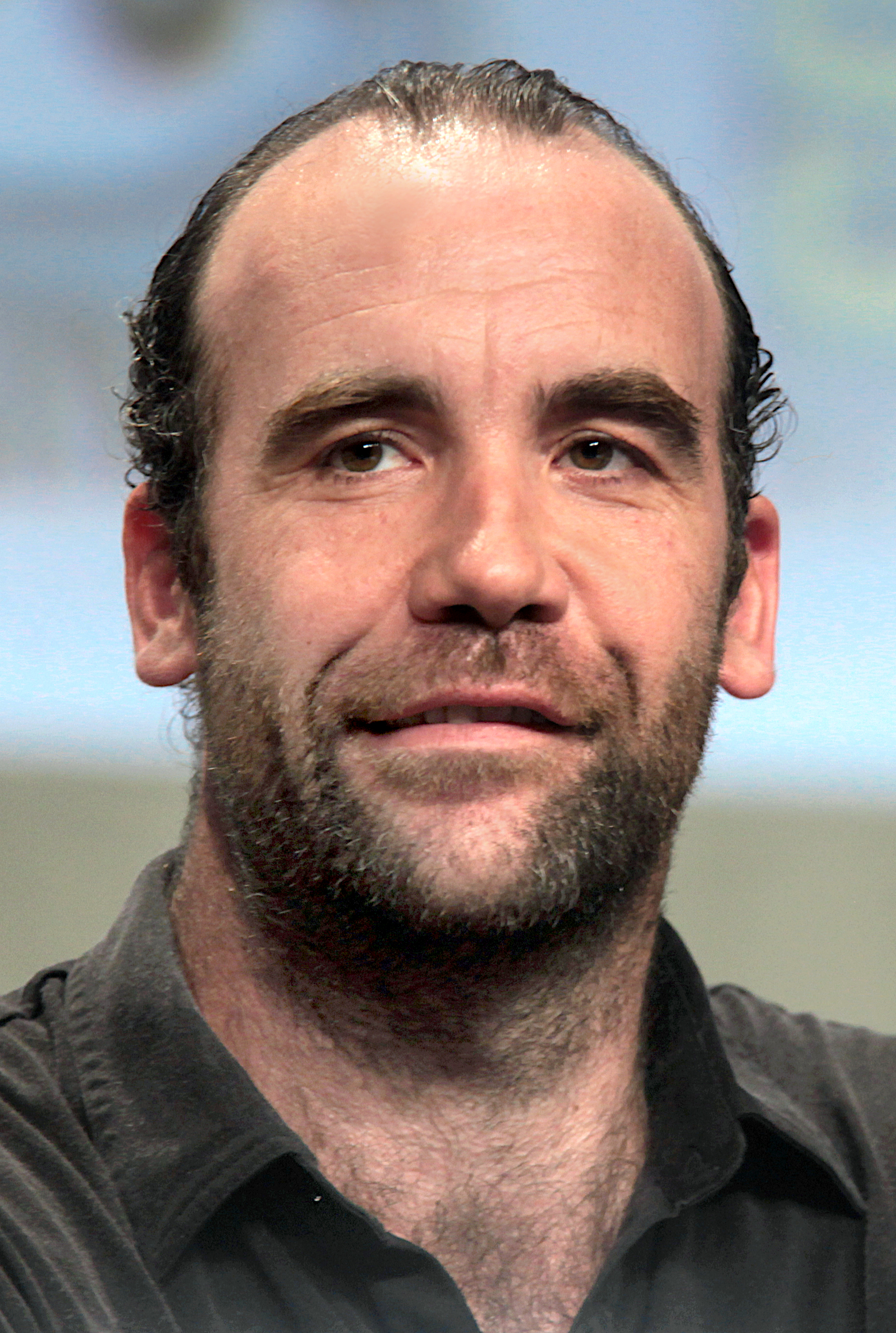
- McCann in 2014
- Born: 24 April 1969 (age 57); Glasgow, Scotland
- Occupation: Actor
- Years active: 1999–present
- Height: 6 ft 6 in (198 cm)

Rory McCann (born 24 April 1969) is a Scottish actor, best known for portraying Sandor "The Hound" Clegane on the HBO series Game of Thrones, Michael "Lurch" Armstrong in Edgar Wright's crime-comedy Hot Fuzz (2007), Jurgen the Brutal in the adventure comedy Jumanji: The Next Level (2019) and the voice of Megatron in Transformers: EarthSpark.

== Early life ==
Rory McCann was born on 24 April 1969 in Glasgow, Scotland. He has a sister, Sally-Gay McCann, born in 1972.

Before becoming an actor, McCann was a painter who studied at the Scottish School of Forestry near Inverness. He also worked as a bridge painter (on the Forth Road Bridge), landscape gardener and carpenter. Rory McCann was first trained as an actor by writer-artist Robert Parsifal Finch in The Actor's Workshop, Glasgow in 1998.

== Career ==
McCann's first acting job was as an extra on the film Willow (1988). He was fired because he laughed during the takes. He appeared in an advertisement for Scott's Porage Oats, dressed in a vest and kilt. As his first major acting role, McCann played a disabled personal trainer in the 2002 television comedy drama The Book Group, winning the Scottish BAFTA for the best television performance of 2002.

Since then, he has taken television roles as Detective Inspector Stuart Brown in State of Play, Peter the Great in Peter in Paradise, and a priest in the award-winning British comedy-drama series Shameless.

He made his Hollywood debut in the 2004 film Alexander, which required the actors to go through training in the African desert, and included shooting in Thailand, Morocco, and a London studio. In 2007, he appeared as Michael "Lurch" Armstrong in Hot Fuzz. In 2008, he played Moby in The Crew and Attila the Hun in the BBC docudrama Heroes and Villains.

McCann portrayed Sandor "The Hound" Clegane in 7 out of 8 seasons of the HBO series Game of Thrones.

Other projects include a BBC TV series by writer Jimmy McGovern called Banished, set in Australia in the 18th century. McCann plays a blacksmith named Marston.

In 2022 he became the narrator of the ITV1 series DNA Journey.

McCann was scheduled to star in the second season of the Star Wars series Ahsoka, as Baylan Skoll, succeeding Ray Stevenson (died 2023) in the role.

== Personal life ==
McCann's younger sister, Sally-Gay McCann, works on costumes for film and television; he worked alongside her on Alexander and Game of Thrones. McCann is a supporter of the Scottish Green Party, and appeared in its 2007 Scottish Parliament general election broadcast.

In 1990, McCann broke multiple bones in a near-fatal rock climbing accident in Yorkshire.

McCann is the former frontman of a defunct band called Thundersoup. He plays the piano, guitar, banjo and mandolin.

McCann lives a solitary, transient lifestyle. He often lives on his boat or in places without modern conveniences. In 2006, he went to Iceland with Gerard Butler to attend the premiere of Beowulf & Grendel. He ended up living in Iceland for a year, part of the time in a tent after losing his apartment, and working as a carpenter.

== Filmography ==
Key
†	Denotes films that have not yet been released

=== Film ===
Year	Title	Role	Notes	Ref.
2003	Young Adam	Sam		
2004	Alexander	Craterus		
2005	Beowulf & Grendel	Breca		
2006	Sixty Six	Policeman		
2007	Hot Fuzz	Michael "Lurch" Armstrong		
2008	The Crew	Mobey		
2009	Solomon Kane	McNess		
2010	Clash of the Titans	Belo		
2011	Season of the Witch	Soldier Commander	Credited as Rory MacCann	
2015	Slow West	John Ross		
2017	XXX: Return of Xander Cage	Tennyson "The Torch"		
2019	Jumanji: The Next Level	Jurgen The Brutal		
2023	Jackdaw	Armstrong		
2024	The Damned	Ragnar		
2024	Gladiator II	Tegula		
2025	Tornado	Kitten		

=== Television ===
Year	Title	Role	Notes	Ref.
2000	Randall & Hopkirk	Bouncer	1 episode	
2000	Monarch of the Glen	Roger	1 episode	
2002	London's Burning	Keith	1 episode	
2002–2003	The Book Group	Kenny McLeod	Main role, 12 episodes	
2003	State of Play	Stuart Brown	1 episode	
2003	Rockface	Adam	Recurring role, 6 episodes	
2006	Shameless	Father Critchon	2 episodes	
2008	Heroes and Villains	Attila the Hun	1 episode	
2011	The Jury	Derek Hatch	Main role, 5 episodes	
2011–2019	Game of Thrones	Sandor "The Hound" Clegane	Main role, 38 episodes	
2015	Banished	Marston	Main role, 4 episodes	
2021	The Irregulars	Arthur "the Birdmaster" Hilton	2 episodes	
2022	The Legend of Vox Machina	Duke Vedmire (voice)	3 episodes	
2022	Transformers: EarthSpark	Megatron (voice)	Main role; 3 seasons	
2024	Knuckles	"The Buyer"	Miniseries, 3 episodes	
2027	Star Wars: Ahsoka †	Baylan Skoll	Season 2	
