= 26th Costume Designers Guild Awards =

Award ceremony for film and television costuming in 2023

- Date: February 21, 2024
- Location: NeueHouse Hollywood, Los Angeles, California
- Country: United States
- Presented by: Costume Designers Guild
- Hosted by: Wendi McLendon-Covey

Highlights
- Excellence in Contemporary Film: Saltburn – Sophie Canale
- Excellence in Period Film: Poor Things – Holly Waddington
- Excellence in Sci-Fi/Fantasy Film: Barbie – Jacqueline Durran

The 26th Costume Designers Guild Awards, honoring excellence in film, television, and short form costume design for 2023, were held on February 21, 2024, at NeueHouse Hollywood in Los Angeles. The nominations were announced on January 4, 2024.

Billie Eilish was presented with the inaugural Vanguard Spotlight Award; the new honor celebrates "a trailblazer who sets new standards in their sphere, not only for their outstanding achievements but also for their courage as a visionary that serves as an inspiration to us all, per the guild". Additionally, Annette Bening received the Spotlight Award.

== Winners and nominees ==
Winners are listed first and in bold.

=== Film ===
Excellence in Contemporary Film	Excellence in Period Film
**Saltburn – Sophie Canale**; American Fiction – Rudy Mance; May December – April Napier; Nyad – Kelli Jones; Renfield – Lisa Lovaas	**Poor Things – Holly Waddington**; Killers of the Flower Moon – Jacqueline West; Maestro – Mark Bridges; Napoleon – Janty Yates and Dave Crossman; Oppenheimer – Ellen Mirojnick
Excellence in Sci-Fi/Fantasy Film
**Barbie – Jacqueline Durran**; Haunted Mansion – Jeffrey Kurland; The Hunger Games: The Ballad of Songbirds & Snakes – Trish Summerville; The Little Mermaid – Colleen Atwood and Christine Cantella; Rebel Moon – Part One: A Child of Fire – Stephanie Porter

=== Television ===
Excellence in Contemporary Television	Excellence in Period Television
**Beef: "The Birds Don't Sing, They Screech in Pain" – Helen Huang (Netflix)**; The Bear: "Fishes" – Courtney Wheeler (FX on Hulu); The Last of Us: "Endure and Survive" – Cynthia Ann Summers (HBO); The Morning Show: "The Kármán Line" – Sophie de Rakoff and Debra McGuire (Apple TV+); Poker Face: "The Orpheus Syndrome" – Trayce Gigi Field (Peacock)	**The Great: "Choose Your Weapon" – Sharon Long (Hulu)**; The Crown: "Ritz" – Amy Roberts (Netflix); Daisy Jones & the Six: "Track 8: Looks Like We Made It" – Denise Wingate (Prime Video); George & Tammy: "Two Story House" – Mitchell Travers (Showtime); The Gilded Age: "You Don't Even Like Opera" – Kasia Walicka-Maimone and Patrick Wiley (HBO)
Excellence in Sci-Fi/Fantasy Television	Excellence in Variety, Reality-Competition, and Live Television
**Ahsoka: "Part Eight: The Jedi, the Witch, and the Warlord" – Shawna Trpcic (posthumous) (Disney+)**; Loki: "1893" – Christine Wada (Disney+); The Mandalorian: "Chapter 22: Guns for Hire" – Shawna Trpcic (posthumous) (Disney+); What We Do in the Shadows: "Pride Parade" – Laura Montgomery (FX); The Witcher: "The Art of the Illusion" – Lucinda Wright (Netflix)	**A Black Lady Sketch Show: "Peek-A-Boob, Your Titty's Out" – Michelle Page Collins (HBO)**; Dancing with the Stars: "Monster Night" – Steven Norman Lee and Daniela Gschwendtner (ABC / Disney+); The Masked Singer: "'80s Night" – Tim Chappel (Fox); The Masked Singer: "One Hit Wonders Night" – Marina Toybina and Steven Norman Lee (Fox); Saturday Night Live: "Aubrey Plaza Host" – Tom Broecker, Christina Natividad, and Ashley Dudek (NBC)

=== Short Form and Illustration ===
Excellence in Short Form Design	Excellence in Costume Illustration
**Madonna X Vanity Fair: The Enlightenment – B. Åkerlund (short film)**; American Horror Story: Delicate: "Official Teaser" – Paula Bradley (commercial); Blink-182: "Dance with Me" – Julie Vogel (music video); Doritos Super Bowl: "Jack's New Angle" – Trayce Gigi Field (commercial); Pepsi: "Great Acting or Great Taste" – Heather Allison (commercial)	**Rebel Moon – Part One: A Child of Fire – Jason Pastrana**; 1923: "War and the Turquoise Tide" – Maggie S. Chan (Paramount+); Haunted Mansion – Barbra Araujo; The Hunger Games: The Ballad of Songbirds & Snakes – Oksana Nedavniaya; Loki: "1893" – Felipe Sanchez (Disney+)

=== Special awards ===
==== Career Achievement Award ====
- Francine Jamison-Tanchuck

==== Spotlight Award ====
- Annette Bening

==== Vanguard Spotlight Award ====
- Billie Eilish
