= James D. Wilcox =

American television and film editor

- Born: Pittsburgh, Pennsylvania, U.S.
- Occupations: Editor, director
- Years active: 1982–present

James D. Wilcox, ACE, is an American film and television editor and director. He is best known for his work on feature films and television series including Thirteen Lives, Hillbilly Elegy, Genius, Roots, CSI: Miami, Everybody Hates Chris, and Star Wars: Ahsoka, part of the Star Wars franchise.

== Life and career ==
James was born in Pittsburgh, Pennsylvania and studied mass communications broadcast management at Clark Atlanta University. He began his editing career in Atlanta, Georgia in 1982. As a producer, he won the Los Angeles Emmy Awards for KCBS-TV's Lip Sync in 1992. He has worked with directors like Ron Howard, James Cameron, Chris Columbus, Tate Taylor, Mario Van Peebles, Damon Wayans, Dave Filoni and Jon Favreau.

James is a member of American Cinema Editors, the Academy of Motion Picture Arts and Sciences, the Academy of Television Arts & Sciences, the Directors Guild of America, and the Motion Picture Editors Guild. His work has received industry recognition, including a Los Angeles Emmy Award and an HPA Award from the Hollywood Professional Association, and he was named to Variety’s Artisan Elite list in 2018.

== Filmography ==
Year	Title	Contribution	Note
2023	Ahsoka	Editor	3 episodes
2022	Thirteen Lives	Editor	Feature film
2017-2021	Genius	Editor	10 episodes
2020	Hillbilly Elegy	Editor	Feature film
2020	Filthy Rich	Editor	1 episode
2019	Raising Dion	Editor	3 episodes
2018	The Gifted	Editor	1 episode
2017-2018	Gone	Editor	4 episodes
2017	Hand of God	Editor	1 episode
2016	Roots	Editor	1 episode
2015	Heroes Reborn	Editor	2 episodes
2015-2015	Hawaii Five-0	Editor and Director	21 episodes, 1 episode
2006-2012	CSI: Miami	Editor and Director	38 episodes, 1 episode
2010	Meditation Makeover-Incense & Beads Not Required	Editor	Documentary short
2006	Reno 911!	Editor	1 episode
2006	Behind the Smile	Editor	Feature film
2005-2006	Everybody Hates Chris	Editor	3 episodes
2002-2005	My Wife and Kids	Editor and Director	60 episodes, 1 episode
2002	Play'd: A Hip Hop Story	Editor	Feature film
2001-2002	Dark Angel	Editor	10 episodes
2000	The Lyricist Lounge Show	Editor	TV series
2000	Soul Food	Editor	1 episode
1998	True Stories from Touched by an Angel	Editor and Producer	Documentary
1997-1998	Biography	Editor	2 episodes
1996	Depraved	Editor	Feature film
1996	Sex, Censorship and the Silver Screen	Editor	1 episode
1994	Science Fiction: A Journey Into the Unknown	Editor	Documentary

== Awards and nominations ==
Year	Result	Award	Category	Work	Ref.
2024	Won	Hollywood Professional Association Awards	Outstanding Editing - Episode or Non-Theatrical Feature (Over 30 Minutes)	Star Wars: Ahsoka : "Part Six: Far, Far Away"	
2023	Nominated	Black Reel Awards	Outstanding Editing	Thirteen Lives	
2018	Won	American Cinema Editors	Best Edited Miniseries or Motion Picture for Television	Genius	
2006	Nominated	NAACP Image Awards	Outstanding Directing in a Comedy Series	My Wife and Kids	
2005	Nominated	BET Comedy Awards	Outstanding Directing for a Comedy Series	My Wife and Kids	
1992	Won	Los Angeles Emmy Awards	Mini-docs	KCBS-TV : "Lip Sync"	
