= Vinny Thomas =

American actor, writer, and comedian

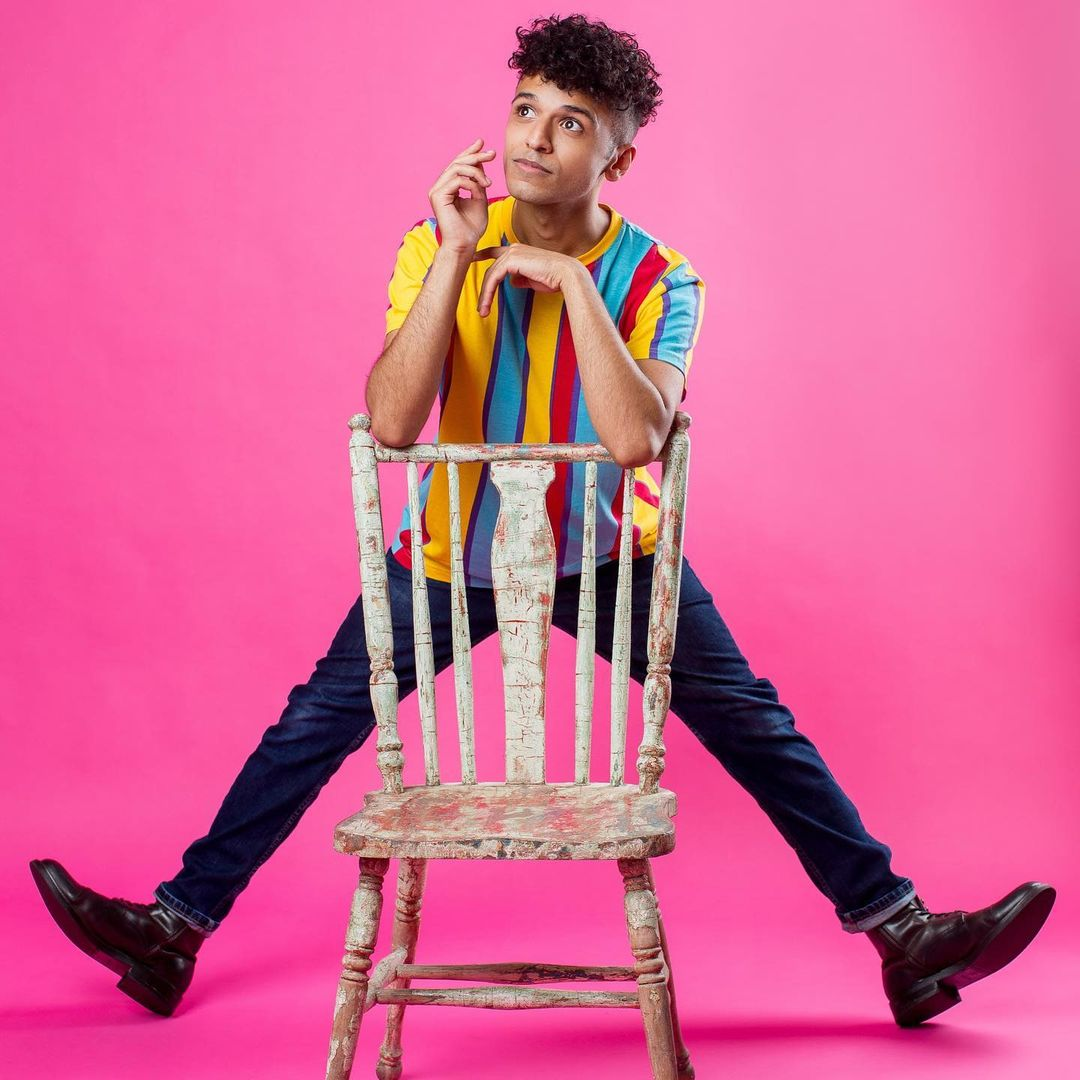
- Thomas in 2020
- Born: Denver, Colorado, U.S.
- Occupations: Actor; comedian; writer
- Years active: 2020–present
- Website: www.vinnythomas.com

Vinny Thomas is an American actor, writer, and comedian. He is best known for his viral videos on Twitter and TikTok. His work has been recognized by Vanity Fair, The Hollywood Reporter, Vulture, USA Today, and Just for Laughs. He acted in the television series Ahsoka and the film You're Cordially Invited (2025). He is a cast member on the Apple TV+ series Platonic.

== Life and career ==
Thomas was raised in Denver, Colorado, where he trained in improvisational comedy at the Bovine Metropolis Theater and Rise Comedy. Although he wanted to be a zoologist most of his youth, his interest in improv was sparked when he joined the improv group Spontaneous Combustion at school. Thomas studied broadcast journalism in college. Thomas is gay.

He moved to Chicago in 2018 to pursue a comedy career. Thomas trained at The Second City and was a member of the house improv group Twisty.

After the onset of the pandemic in 2020, Thomas gained wider prominence for self-produced videos posted to Twitter and other social media sites. Many of his videos involve animals, the nexus of his two interests in animals and comedy. In particular, his video as an extraterrestrial member of the fictional Intergalactic Federation reviewing Earth's application for entry went viral. In other videos he has appeared as various creatures and exaggerated characters including a warthog, a fly, and a Southern attendee at the Kentucky Derby. His videos sometimes respond to current events such as one video where he posed as a female condor that reproduced asexually, based on an actual instance that was reported on in October 2021. In one parody video released in 2022, he posed as a Mars Inc. spokesperson announcing the changes to the green M&M's costume: "So you’re welcome, feminists, the green M&M is no longer a perfect 10." One video where he impersonates a pigeon at a Pride parade urging attendees to throw him bread was named to Vanity Fair's list of 2021 Best Performances. He was also recognized by The Hollywood Reporter as one of six notable social media comics.

Since 2021, he has regularly contributed guest writing for Wait, Wait...Don't Tell Me!.

Thomas appeared in his first television acting role as a recurring cast member on the Apple TV+ series Platonic (2022–) starring Seth Rogen and Rose Byrne.

One of his Tweets was the solution to a New Yorker crossword puzzle question on July 12, 2022. Thomas was named to USA Today's 2022 list of 10 up-and-coming comedians you need to know and Vulture's list of Comedians You Should and Will Know in 2022.

Thomas was a performer in the 2023 CBS Showcase. He appeared in the television miniseries Ahsoka (2023) as Jai Kell, a character originally voiced by Dante Basco in the animated series Star Wars Rebels. In 2025, Thomas was announced to be a performer on the second season of the panel show Smartypants, on Dropout.

In 2025 Thomas made his feature film debut in You're Cordially Invited.

== Accolades ==
- 2021 New Faces, Just for Laughs
- Best Performances of 2021, Vanity Fair
- Comedians You Should and Will Know, 2022, Vulture
- 10 up-and-coming comedians you need to know, 2022, USA Today

== Filmography ==
=== Television ===
Year	Title	Role	Notes
2023–	Platonic	Omar	Recurring role
2023	Ahsoka	Senator Jai Kell	1 episode
2024	After Midnight	Himself (panelist)	
2025	Smartypants	Himself	Episode: "Crows, Anime, Parties"
2026	Big Mistakes	Teenager	Episode: "You F-ck with My Family, You F-ck with Me"

=== Film ===
Year	Title	Role	Notes
2025	You're Cordially Invited	Davey	
