= Eman Esfandi =

American actor (born 1994)

- Esfandi at GalaxyCon San Jose in 2026
- Born: September 27, 1994 (age 31); Laredo, Texas, U.S.
- Education: Laredo College (AS); University of Texas, Austin (BA)
- Occupation: Actor
- Years active: 2017–present

Eman Esfandi (Persian: ایمان اسفندی) (born September 27, 1994) is an American actor. He is best known for portraying the Jedi Ezra Bridger in the Disney+ series Ahsoka.

== Biography ==
Eman Esfandi was born in Laredo, Texas, to immigrant parents. His father is Iranian and his mother is from Ecuador. Before pursuing a career in acting, he obtained an associate's degree in business administration from Laredo College and a Bachelor of Arts degree in economics from the University of Texas at Austin in 2017.

== Filmography ==
=== As actor ===
| Year | Title | Role | Notes |
|---|---|---|---|
| 2017 | Socius Rex | Franz | Short |
| 2017 | FU Glory Days | Hammer | Short |
| 2017 | A Palestinian Christmas | Nader | Short |
| 2017 | 10 Minutes to Show | Duncan | Short |
| 2017 | Death by Script | Protageist | Short |
| 2017 | Mother of the Golds | Ea | Short |
| 2018 | Why We Fight | Khalid | Short |
| 2018 | Tightly Wound | Jerk | Short |
| 2018 | Red 11 | Funny Guy | Film |
| 2018 | Phadera | Apollo | Film |
| 2018 | Clean Break | Brian | Short |
| 2018 | Rebel Without a Crew: The Series | Himself | TV series |
| 2019 | Official Latino Film and Arts Festival | Himself | TV special |
| 2019 | I Am Mackenzie | Skater | Short |
| 2019 | Austin Weird | Sam | Film |
| 2021 | King Richard | Barry | Theatrical film |
| 2022 | The Inspection | Ismail | Theatrical film |
| 2022 | Day Trip | Julian | Short |
| 2023 | That F**king Word | Sam | Short |
| 2023–present | Star Wars: Ahsoka | Ezra Bridger | Disney+ series |
| 2026 | Spider-Man: Brand New Day | The Boyfriend | Theatrical film |

=== As filmmaker ===
| Year | Title | Role | Notes |
|---|---|---|---|
| 2018 | Pepito | Director, producer | Short |
| 2018 | 120 | Director, producer, and editor | Short |
