= Shawna Trpcic =

American costume designer (1966–2023)

- Born: October 18, 1966; Artesia, California, U.S.
- Died: October 4, 2023 (aged 56); Palm Desert, California, U.S.
- Occupation: Costume designer
- Notable work: Firefly; Angel; Dr. Horrible's Sing-Along Blog; Dollhouse; The Mandalorian; Ahsoka; Foundation
- Children: 2

Shawna Trpcic (/ˈtɜːrpsɪk/; née Leavell, October 18, 1966 – October 4, 2023) was an American costume designer.

== Biography ==
Shawna Trpcic was born in Artesia, California, on October 18, 1966. She got her start in the industry with the 1990 film Megaville, and went on to work as a wardrobe assistant on the films Toys and Red Shoe Diaries. She later became the costume designer on Joss Whedon's Firefly, Angel, Doctor Horrible's Sing-Along Blog and Dollhouse, as well as Marti Noxon's Point Pleasant. She was also the costume designer for Torchwood: Miracle Day.

In December 2005, Trpcic auctioned off several of the costumes from Firefly that were in her private collection. Many of those costumes were purchased by fans who later wore them to the 2006 Browncoat Ball in San Francisco. Trpcic attended the ball, along with Jonathan A Logan (who made Mal's original browncoat from Trpcic's design) and posed for a group shot with everyone who was wearing her original costumes. Trpcic altered her own wedding dress to create the ballgown worn by Morena Baccarin (as Inara Serra) in the Firefly episode "Shindig". Trpcic often attempted to add pink flamingos somewhere on her costumes as she considered this to be her signature mark. An example of this is pointed out by Trpcic herself in the audio commentary to "Shindig", where they are visible on the lapel of the character Badger played by Mark Sheppard.

Beginning in 2019, Trpcic worked as the costume designer for seasons 2 and 3 of the Star Wars series The Mandalorian. She received attention for her work in The Book of Boba Fett where she also researched original designs for the original movie to have costumes capturing its feel. She collaborated with actress Jennifer Beals to design the costume for Beals' new character Garsa Fwip. She was nominated for an Emmy for her work on season 2 and 3 of The Mandalorian and The Book of Boba Fett. Her last contribution to the Star Wars universe was designing the series Ahsoka.

== Personal life and death ==
Trpcic volunteered at Juvenile Hall and taught art at a men's maximum security state prison in Northern California. She was a Christian and had two children.

Trpcic died on October 4, 2023 in Palm Desert, California, at the age of 56, two weeks before her 57th birthday.
