= Nelson Lee =

Taiwanese-Canadian actor

Nelson Lee 李志傑
- Born: October 16, 1975 (age 50); Taipei, Taiwan
- Occupation: Actor
- Years active: 1999–present

Nelson Lee (born October 16, 1975; Chinese name: 李志傑) is a Taiwanese-Canadian actor. He is best known for portraying Senator Hamato Xiono in Ahsoka, and Dragon King in Stargirl.

== Life and career ==
Lee was born in Taipei, Taiwan on October 16, 1975, and raised in Canada. Lee is a 1993 graduate from Saint John High School. He attended the University of Toronto, where he studied business and philosophy.

He studied at the American Academy of Dramatic Arts in New York City. Early acting roles included two episodes Oz (2002), as inmate Li Chen, and several appearances across the Law & Order franchise.

In 2020, Lee was cast as Dragon King in Stargirl. The same year, he starred in the Disney live-action adaptation of Mulan as The Chancellor.

In 2023, Lee appeared as Senator Hamato Xiono in Ahsoka, and as chef Emile Shao in Good Trouble. The following year, he portrayed Hong Konger journalist Tony in Alex Garland's dystopian thriller Civil War.

On September 19, 2025, Lee was announced as the new voice actor for the zombies character Takeo Masaki for Call of Duty: Black Ops 7, who was previously voiced by Tom Kane. Kane retired from voice acting due to a stroke he suffered in November 2020.

== Filmography ==
=== Film ===
| Year | Title | Character | Notes |
|---|---|---|---|
| 2024 | Civil War | Tony | |
| 2023 | Godzilla Minus One | Additional voices | English dub |
| 2021 | I Was a Simple Man | Mark | |
| 2020 | Mulan | The Chancellor | |
| 2017 | All Saints | Ye Win | |
| 2009 | Vacancy 2: The First Cut | Groom | |
| 2004 | Strip Search | Xiu-Juan Chang | |

=== Television ===
| Year | Title | Character | Notes |
|---|---|---|---|
| 2024 | Secret Level | Sean | Voice, episode: "Sifu: It Takes a Life" |
| 2023–present | Ahsoka | Hamato Xiono | 2 episodes |
| 2023 | Good Trouble | Emile Shao | Recurring guest star 5 episodes |
| 2020 | Stargirl | Dragon King / Dr. Shiro Ito | Recurring role 8 episodes |
| 2020 | Westworld | Limbic Dealer | Episode: "The Mother of Exiles" |
| 2019 | Evil | Daniel Ling | Episode: "Let x = 9" |
| 2019 | Law & Order: Special Victims Unit | Sergeant Joe Chin | Episode: "Counselor, It's Chinatown" |
| 2019 | Claws | Professor | 4 episodes |
| 2018 | Shooter | Adam Lee | Episode: "The Importance of Service" |
| 2018 | Sneaky Pete | Tenzin | 2 episodes |
| 2018 | Lethal Weapon | Paul Mason | Episode: "Sneaky Money" |
| 2017 | Ten Days in the Valley | Sheldon | Recurring role 5 episodes |
| 2017 | Madam Secretary | Geshe Tashi | Episode: "Swept Away" |
| 2017 | Superior Donuts | Officer Li | Episode: "The Amazing Racists" |
| 2016 | The Night Shift | Dr. Park | Episode: "All In" |
| 2016 | Stitchers | Bo Cheng | Episode: "The Dying Shame" |
| 2015 | NCIS: New Orleans | Roger Liu | Episode: "Insane in the Membrane" |
| 2015 | CSI: Cyber | Detective Cho | Episode: "Kidnapping 2.0" |
| 2013 | Longmire | Mr. Chen | Episode: "Natural Order" |
| 2011 | Covert Affairs | Xi Peng | Episode: "World Leader Pretend" |
| 2011 | The Chicago Code | Matthew Chow | Episode: "O'Leary's Cow" |
| 2010 | Hawaii Five-O | Nae Shan | Episode: "Po'ipu |
| 2009 | Cold Case | Dr. Andiman | Episode: "Forensics" |
| 2009 | Virtuality | Kenji Yamamoto | TV film |
| 2008 | Ring of Death | Chow | TV film |
| 2006 | Bones | Special Agent Eric Zhang | Episode: "The Woman in the Sand" |
| 2006 | Blade: The Series | Shen | Main role |
| 2005 | Law & Order: Criminal Intent | Kevin Lee | Episode: "Scared Crazy" |
| 2003 | Law & Order | Roy Leung | Episode: "Sheltered" |
| 2002 | Oz | Li Chen | 2 episodes |
| 2001 | Law & Order: Special Victims Unit | Johnny Chen | Episode: "Inheritance" |
| 2001 | Law & Order | Kenny Eng | Episode: "Armed Forces" |

=== Video games ===
| Year | Title | Character |
|---|---|---|
| 2005 | The Warriors | Additional Soldiers |
| 2025 | Ghost of Yotei | The Snake |
| 2025 | Call of Duty: Black Ops 7 | Takeo Masaki |
