= Huyang =

Ancient droid instructor from Star Wars

- Star Wars character
- First appearance: Star Wars: The Clone Wars (2012)
- Last appearance: Star Wars: Young Jedi Adventures (2024)
- Voiced by: David Tennant

In-universe information
- Species: Droid (Mark IV architect droid)
- Occupation: Jedi mentor, lightsaber building instructor
- Affiliation: Jedi Order

Huyang is a fictional character from the Star Wars media franchise. It first appeared in the animated series Star Wars: The Clone Wars (2012) and later featured in the live-action series Ahsoka (2023) and Star Wars: Young Jedi Adventures (2023). Huyang is an ancient droid who guided generations of Jedi younglings through the ritual and technical process of constructing their first lightsabers.

== Character overview ==
Huyang was introduced in the fifth season of The Clone Wars as a Jedi instructor aboard the training vessel Crucible. Active for over 25,000 years, his primary role is to mentor young Jedi and preserve the traditions of the Order. His extensive archive contains detailed records of every Jedi lightsaber built throughout history. Huyang's teachings combine historical knowledge, technical expertise, and philosophical insight, making him a symbol of Jedi tradition.

Unlike other droids in the Star Wars universe, Huyang does not have an alphanumeric designation but a unique, personal name, emphasizing its status as a respected figure and guardian of wisdom among Jedi.

== Appearances ==
=== Star Wars: The Clone Wars ===
In The Clone Wars, Huyang appears as the instructor for Jedi initiates preparing to build their lightsabers. He supervises the process of kyber crystal selection, guides students through the assembly, and provides context for Jedi history and ethics. He wisdom has mentored prominent Jedi including Yoda and Mace Windu.

=== Ahsoka ===
Huyang returns as a principal supporting character in Ahsoka (2023). Accompanying Ahsoka Tano in her travels, Huyang offers technical and moral guidance, helps analyze mysteries, and supports the protagonist in both combat and Jedi philosophy. His long span of service and vast memory make him essential in passing on the Order’s traditions and adapting them to a post-Imperial era.

=== Star Wars: Young Jedi Adventures ===
David Tennant reprised his role as Huyang in Star Wars: Young Jedi Adventures. In the show, Huyang helps repair a lightsaber that once belonged to Jedi Master Barabo.

== Personality and philosophy ==
Throughout his appearances, Huyang is portrayed as wise, patient, and sometimes humorous. More than a technical instructor, he embodies the contemplative and caretaking aspects of Jedi mentorship, fostering cooperation, personal growth, and mindful self-improvement.

== Name and symbolism ==
The name "Huyang" is distinctive among Star Wars droids, who are typically designated by alphanumeric codes (e.g., “R2-D2”, “C-3PO”).

In Mandarin Chinese, the word 胡杨 (hú yáng) refers to the Euphrates poplar tree (Populus euphratica), which grows in the deserts of northwest China. This tree is celebrated for its exceptional resilience, capable of surviving in arid and salty environments for centuries.

Additionally, the Chinese phrase 护养(hù yǎng) means "to protect and to raise," combining 护 (hù, protect) and 养(yǎng, to raise or nurture). This verb expresses the act of caring for and nurturing someone or something in a protective manner.

While there is no official statement from Lucasfilm linking Huyang’s name to these terms, the resonance with both the enduring tree and the concept of protective mentorship aligns closely with the character’s portrayal in the Star Wars universe as a wise and patient guide, guardian of Jedi tradition and a nurturer of new generations.

== Reception ==
The character is considered one of the most enduring and significant figures in the Jedi mythos by Star Wars critics and fans. Popular sources highlight Huyang’s contribution to Jedi lore, his role in training successive generations, and his function as a living archive of the Order’s history.
