= The Courtship of Princess Leia =

1994 novel by Dave Wolverton

- Author: Dave Wolverton
- Cover artist: Drew Struzan
- Language: English
- Series: Canon C
- Genre: Science fiction
- Publisher: Bantam Spectra
- Publication date: May 1, 1994
- Publication place: United States
- Media type: Print (hardcover & paperback)
- Pages: 327
- ISBN: 0-553-56937-6
- Preceded by: Solo Command
- Followed by: A Forest Apart

The Courtship of Princess Leia is a 1994 science fiction novel by American writer Dave Wolverton, part of the Star Wars franchise. It continued the streak of New York Times Bestsellers, which started with 1991's Heir to the Empire. The Courtship of Princess Leia is set in the Star Wars expanded universe, and deals with the downfall of Warlord Zsinj and the circumstances leading to the marriage of Han Solo and Princess Leia, characters that originated in the 1977 film Star Wars: A New Hope.

== Plot ==
=== Background ===
Though the Battle of Endor resulted in the destruction of the Emperor and Darth Vader, along with the best of the Imperial Starfleet, the remnants of the Empire are still a danger. One of the recently formed New Republic's most dire foes is a splinter faction of the former Empire, led by Warlord Zsinj. Zsinj is a cunning strategist whose skills have earned him the allegiance of almost a full third of the entire galaxy. Both the Imperial Remnant and the New Republic have dedicated considerable forces to end his reign. Zsinj however has possession of the Iron Fist, one of the few Super Star Destroyers left, and whenever nearly cornered, slips away to a secret stronghold where the Iron Fist is repaired.

=== Summary ===
At the opening of the novel, Han Solo, who from aboard the Mon Remonda has been prosecuting the search for this hidden fortress, wearily returns to the recently captured Coruscant expecting an end to the long separation between him and his beloved, Princess Leia, head of the New Republic. To his great surprise, when his vessel drops out of hyperspace and into the Coruscant system, he is met by multiple Imperial Star Destroyers, Hapan Battle Dragons, and Hapes Nova Class battle cruiser. Eventually, Han learns that the Hapes cluster had sent a delegation of some manner to the New Republic. He lands and enters the Imperial Palace, where, with the help of C-3PO, who translates and comments on the formal diplomatic reception, he watches the Hapes delegation present to Leia a number of stunning gifts: the dozen Star Destroyers Han had seen, a Hapan Gun of Command, a small plant resembling a bonsai which promotes longevity and intelligence, and the hand of the Hapes cluster's ruler Ta'a Chume's son, Prince Isolder, in holy matrimony.

The effect is devastating; Leia nearly accepts, driving Han into a frenzy of fear and jealousy. Han eventually wanders into a cantina in the lower reaches of Coruscant, where he participates in a high-stakes sabacc game where one of his opponents runs out of liquid financial instruments and instead proffers real estate: a deed to an entire habitable planet, Dathomir. Han thinks he has found a gift which would prove his worthiness to Leia and compare favorably with the gifts of Isolder (and provide a place to resettle the expatriates of Alderaan). When Leia examines his gift and points out that he has been conned (since Dathomir was in the section of the galaxy controlled by Zsinj), Han is further devastated. Isolder compounds insult with injury by denigrating the Millennium Falcon and offering Han a Nova battle cruiser if he abandons his quest to win Leia's heart, causing Han to snap.

Han abducts Leia using the Gun of Command, and flees with her and Chewbacca aboard his recently refitted Millennium Falcon to Dathomir. Prince Isolder pursues him with his Hapan fleet and arrives at Dathomir shortly after Han despite Han's headstart, as Isolder is aided by the Jedi Master Luke Skywalker, who used his Force powers to navigate a shorter (but still safe) path through hyperspace. There they both discovered that Zsinj had truly laid claim to Dathomir—in orbit around it was the Iron Fist, a number of other capital ships, and the complete orbital shipyard Han had hunted for so long.

The Millennium Falcon had been forced to land on Dathomir itself, where it is captured by the Imperial garrison Zsinj had marooned on the surface years ago. Isolder sets out in his Miy'til fighter accompanied by Luke's X-wing fighter while the Hapan fleet fights a covering action before it retreats into hyperspace to inform the New Republic, Imperial Remnant, and the Hapes Consortium of the whereabouts of Zsinj heretofore secret redoubt.

On the surface, Isolder and Luke discover the remnants of the star-borne Jedi training academy, the Chu'unthor. Luke had seen recordings noting how Yoda and a number of other Jedi knights had failed to retrieve the library of the Chu'unthor, due to interference by the Witches of Dathomir or the Nightsisters. The best they had been able to do was seal the vessel thoroughly, so thoroughly that only centuries later the first intruder would need a lightsaber to gain access. As they peruse the vessel, however, Isolder and Luke are captured by a Dathomiri witch, who enslaves them and takes them to her village.

Having learned about Han Solo's presence on the planet, Zsinj had dictated a combination of ultimatum and deal with the head of the Nightsisters, Gethzerion: they would give him Solo to torture and execute as he liked, and he would give them an Imperial shuttle to pilot where they like. If they did not, he would keep his "nightcloak" (an interconnected network of geostationary satellites, which reflected all solar emissions back into space) intact, which would slowly freeze Dathomir, killing all life on the planet.

Eventually, Han's group infiltrates the Imperial garrison and steal the Falcon, piloting it out into the ongoing Battle of Dathomir. Solo allows the Iron Fist to acquire the Falcon with a tractor beam; once it is within the ship's deflector shields, he breaks it free of the beam lock, piloting his vessel over the superstructure of the gigantic vessel. Arriving upon the main bridge, he launches two concussion missiles, destroying the bridge, killing Zsinj, and knocking out the ventral shields. With the Iron Fist exposed, the Hapan fleet uses their ion cannons to disable the ship. Defeated, Zsinj's empire soon crumbles. Shortly thereafter, Solo and Leia marry, having realized during their intrepid journey together that they loved each other. Isolder is consoled by the fact he has fallen in love with his captor, Teneniel Djo.

== Reception ==
Reception for The Courtship of Princess Leia was predominantly positive and the book was a New York Times Bestseller in both its hardback and paperback formats. Both The Hamilton Spectator and the Milwaukee Sentinel have given positive reviews for the novel and the reviewer for the Milwaukee Sentinel commented that the book continued the "stellar tradition of George Lucas' Star Wars movies". Trade reviews were also mostly positive, and Publishers Weekly opined that although parts of the book were disappointing, "the novel [raised] expectations for Wolverton's future works once he moves on to other things". Tor.com included the book in a list of "Where to Begin with Star Wars Books", as they saw it as "one of the craziest Star Wars novels ever written" and that "after you read it you won’t be able to think of any other way that Han and Leia’s relationship could have progressed towards marriage".

== Legacy ==
The Chu'unthor was mentioned in the 2010 reference book The Jedi Path. In 2014, following the acquisition of Lucasfilm by Disney, all spin-off works up to that point (excluding The Clone Wars) were declared non-canon and part of the Star Wars Legends universe. Dathomir became a major location in The Clone Wars, retroactively established as the homeworld of both Darth Maul and Asajj Ventress (replacing Rattatak). Dathomir and the witches were both referenced in The Book of Boba Fett when Boba Fett receives a rancor. Fett mentions wanting to ride the rancor "like the witches on Dathomir."
