= Migs Mayfeld =

Fictional character from The Mandalorian

- Star Wars character
- Mayfeld in The Mandalorian second season episode "Chapter 15: The Believer" (2020)
- First appearance: "Chapter 6: The Prisoner"; The Mandalorian; (2019)
- Created by: Jon Favreau
- Portrayed by: Bill Burr

In-universe information
- Full name: Migs Mayfeld
- Species: Human
- Gender: Male
- Occupation: Mercenary; Imperial sharpshooter (formerly)
- Affiliation: Galactic Empire (formerly); Ran Malk's crew (formerly); Marshal of the New Republic; Din Djarin's Militia
- Homeworld: Woostri

Migs Mayfeld is a fictional character in the Star Wars franchise who appears in the Disney+ television series The Mandalorian. He is a former Imperial sharpshooter turned mercenary who leads a crew in an attempt to rescue a prisoner from a New Republic prison transport ship. His team includes the show's protagonist, "The Mandalorian", with whom he repeatedly clashes and ultimately betrays. The Mandalorian outsmarts him, resulting in Mayfeld's arrest and imprisonment, though he is later released so that he can aid the Mandalorian's efforts to rescue Grogu. As a result, the character evolves from a minor antagonist to an ally of the Mandalorian, with whom he eventually makes amends during their mission.

Mayfeld is portrayed by actor and comedian Bill Burr, who was not a fan of Star Wars and repeatedly publicly mocked the franchise and its fans before he accepted the role. The Mandalorian creator Jon Favreau offered the part to Burr, believing his past criticism of the franchise would make his casting that much more amusing. Several reviewers have noted that Mayfeld's sardonic personality and hard-edged sense of humor are similar to Burr's real-life comedic style. Burr was extremely impressed with the filming of The Mandalorian, complimenting the technical aspects of filming as well as the writing style of the series.

The character of Mayfeld received a generally positive response from reviewers, with many complimenting Burr's performance and the humor the character brought to the series. Reviewers critical of Mayfeld felt the character was flat, underdeveloped, or too incompetent as a mercenary. Mayfeld received a more positive response for his appearance in second season episode "Chapter 15: The Believer", which explored his character in more depth. Burr received a significant amount of mock outrage from fans for a scene in "Chapter 6: The Prisoner", in which he dropped Grogu, the show's hugely popular breakout character.

== Appearances ==
=== Backstory ===
Migs Mayfeld is a former sharpshooter from the Galactic Empire, which has fallen out of power by the time that The Mandalorian is set. He uses two blaster pistols, as well as a third blaster controlled by a droid arm attached to his backpack, which he can extract and retract as necessary for additional firepower. The character's first name was not revealed until second season of The Mandalorian.

=== Season 1 ===
Mayfeld appears in the episode "Chapter 6: The Prisoner", in which he leads a crew of mercenaries in an attempt to rescue a prisoner from a New Republic prison transport ship. He is appointed by Ranzar "Ran" Malk, the leader of the mercenaries, as the point man for the mission, Ran asserts that Mayfeld has the same level of authority on the mission as Ran himself would. with a crew that includes the show's protagonist, a bounty hunter known as "The Mandalorian", as well as fellow mercenaries Burg, Q9-0, and Xi'an. Unbeknownst to the Mandalorian, however, the rescue target is a Twi'lek alien named Qin, with whom the Mandalorian previously had a falling out, and the mercenaries intend to betray the Mandalorian once Qin is rescued.

When the Mandalorian mockingly questions Mayfeld's abilities, alluding to the fact that former Imperial stormtroopers were notoriously bad shots, Mayfeld defensively responds, "I wasn't a stormtrooper, wiseass." During the trip to the prison transport, Mayfeld repeatedly mocks the Mandalorian as well, urging him to remove his helmet, and suggesting he may be hiding his face because he is secretly a Gungan. At one point, the mercenary crew discovered Grogu, a young alien also known as "The Child", whom the Mandalorian was hiding within his ship, the Razor Crest. Mayfeld questions whether Grogu is a pet, and further mocks the Mandalorian by pretending he is going to drop Grogu. When Q9-0 suddenly takes the ship out of hyperspace without warning the crew, Mayfeld falls and does drop Grogu, but he is unharmed. Upon arrival at the prison transport, Mayfeld, Xi'an, Burg, and the Mandalorian enter the ship while Q9-0 disables onboard surveillance and transmits directions to them from the Razor Crest cockpit.

After gunfights with several security droids, Mayfeld's party reached the transport's control room where they encounter a New Republican guard named Davan. Mayfeld wants to kill Davan, but the Mandalorian disagrees, and the two draw guns on each other as a result, leading to Xi'an killing Davan with a knife. The mercenaries reach a prison cell and release Qin, after which Mayfeld and the others trap the Mandalorian in the cell and try to abandon him there. After the Mandalorian escapes, he jams communication between Mayfeld's crew and Q9-0. Mayfeld and Qin become separated from Xi'an and Burg. While the latter duo attempts to find and kill the Mandalorian, Mayfeld and Qin decide to try to escape on their own; Qin promises he will triple Mayfeld's compensation if he gets Qin off the ship. After Mayfeld and Qin split up, the Mandalorian stalks Mayfeld, sneaking up on him in a hallway as the lights flicker on and off, and Mayfeld screams as the Mandalorian comes upon him. The Mandalorian did not kill Mayfeld, but instead locked him in a cell in the prison transport with Xi'an and Burg.

=== Season 2 ===
Mayfeld is mentioned and pictured at the end of the episode "Chapter 14: The Tragedy". After Grogu's capture by Moff Gideon's Imperial remnant, the Mandalorian decides to break out Mayfeld, who was arrested by the New Republic and sentenced to 50 years of service at the Karthon Chop Fields. To learn where he is being held, the Mandalorian visits his ally Cara Dune, who has become a marshal for the New Republic and has access to files on Mayfeld.

In "Chapter 15: The Believer", Mayfeld (also called inmate 34667) is temporarily released from prison by Cara to assist the Mandalorian and his group by accessing the Empire's network in Morak, a secret Imperial mining hub, to learn the location of Gideon's ship. After successfully infiltrating the hub with the Mandalorian, Mayfeld becomes nervous and panicky when seeing his old commander Valin Hess, forcing the Mandalorian to retrieve the data by removing his helmet. However, when Hess questions him, Mayfeld intercedes, and when they reminisce about their participation in Operation Cinder in which thousands were killed, Mayfeld shoots Hess, initiating a violent escape during which the entire facility is destroyed. For his help in obtaining the data, Mayfeld is allowed to leave by Cara, who assures him that he will be declared dead.

== Characterization ==
As a former Imperial sharpshooter, Mayfeld is good in a fight and is an excellent marksman; the character Ran Malk refers to him "one of the best triggermen I've ever seen". He has a hard-edged sense of humor, which several reviewers compared to the real-life comedic style of Bill Burr, the actor and comedian who portrays the character. Mayfeld enjoys mocking others, and has a bullying personality; a Polygon article by Charlie Hall described him as "the epitome of a schoolyard bully but with a murderous streak". He also speaks with Burr's same real-life Boston accent. Mayfeld is arrogant, hot-headed, ruthless, unpredictable, and has a sardonic attitude. Space.com writer Scott Snowden described him as a cowboy-like character. Mayfeld is also duplicitous and untrustworthy, as he shows by his willingness to betray the Mandalorian after their mission together. Comic Book Resources writer Sam Stone theorized that Mayfeld's cynicism and mean-spirited personality may be rooted in bitterness toward the Galactic Empire having lost its war with the Rebel Alliance, thus reducing Mayfeld's role to that of an outlaw. Stone wrote that Mayfeld appears "visibly frustrated by his time fighting for the losing side of the Galactic Civil War before taking his talents to less-than-legal clients".

== Concept and creation ==
=== Portrayal ===
Mayfeld is portrayed by actor and comedian Bill Burr. Burr was not a fan of the Star Wars franchise, which he had repeatedly and publicly mocked in the past, as well as Game of Thrones and several other popular science fiction and fantasy franchises. In a 2015 interview with Conan O'Brien, Burr described the original Star Wars film as a "cheesy self-help book put in outer space with, like, Muppets". Burr also regularly mocked Star Wars fans, particularly during the release of new films, saying things like: "How old are you? Why are you still dressing like Boba Fett?"

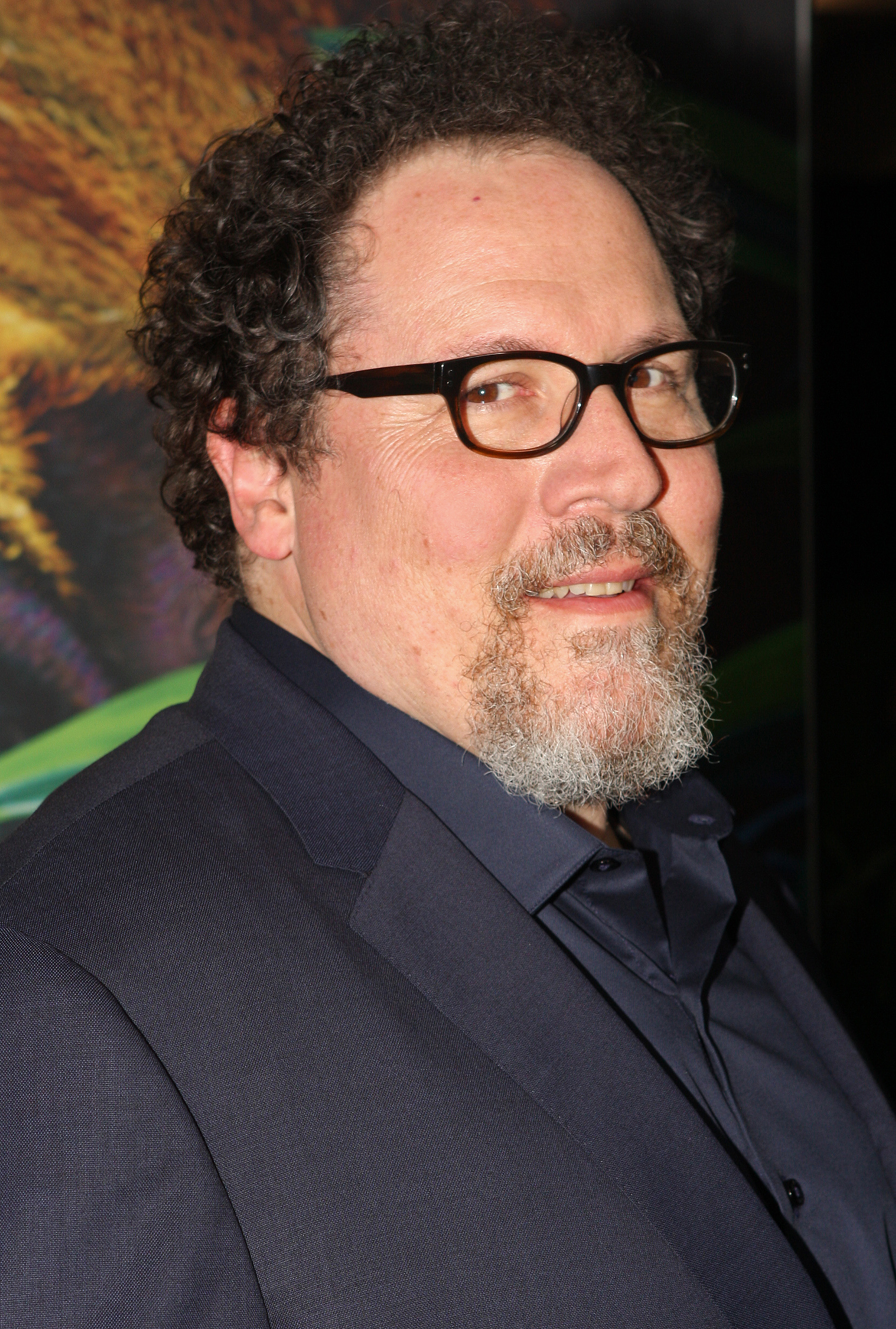
Jon Favreau (pictured), the creator and showrunner of The Mandalorian, approached Bill Burr to play the part of Mayfeld.

Burr met Jon Favreau, the creator and showrunner of The Mandalorian, through their mutual friend Mike Binder, who had directed Burr's stand-up comedy film Paper Tiger (2019). Burr was also acquainted with Favreau through actor Vince Vaughn, who starred along with Favreau in the film Swingers (1996) and was an executive producer of Burr's animated sitcom F Is for Family. Additionally, Favreau was a listener of Burr's comedy podcast, Monday Morning Podcast, and Burr appeared on The Chef Show, a cooking show Favreau created. Favreau approached Burr at a birthday party to discuss a role on The Mandalorian he felt would be a good fit for Burr. Burr pointed out his previous mockery of Star Wars and suggested he give the role to someone more appropriate, but Favreau felt it would be funny if Burr played the role given his lack of enthusiasm for the franchise, and he believed Burr's fans would find it amusing. Burr's wife, Nia Hill, urged him to accept the part, which he ultimately did, although Burr said he would have accepted any offer by Favreau based on his respect for the director.

Burr's casting on The Mandalorian was first revealed at the Star Wars Celebration fan convention in Chicago on April 14, 2019, when he was briefly seen in a teaser trailer during a panel discussion about the series. The footage was only intended to be viewed by Celebration attendants, but photos and videos of Burr's footage taken by fans later leaked to the Internet. Jake Kleinman of Inverse wrote: "Early footage from The Mandalorian didn't reveal much except that he sounds like a total badass." Burr himself first confirmed his appearance on the series via the social media network Twitter on August 24, 2019. According to Metro Boston writer Matt Juul, "fans of the franchise were both excited and a bit skeptical" when the casting was announced, due to Burr's past criticism of the Star Wars franchise. Mayfeld was featured briefly on the first official trailer for The Mandalorian, released on August 23, 2019; Burr said "you see the back of my bald head for half a second". Mayfeld's face became visible in his brief appearance in the second Mandalorian trailer, released on October 28, 2019, with the character firing his weapons at an off-screen enemy. Several fans expressed excitement about Burr's character on social media after the trailer's release, with some saying he was the primary reason they would be watching the show.

Burr is one of several comedians with brief acting roles in the first season of The Mandalorian, including Brian Posehn, Horatio Sanz, Amy Sedaris, Richard Ayoade, Adam Pally, and Jason Sudeikis. Nick Mangione of Geek.com jokingly wrote: "Is this series just an excuse for Jon Favreau to get all his favorite comedians into the Star Wars universe?"

=== Filming ===
Several of Burr's scenes for The Mandalorian were filmed on a sound stage in Southern California on a "Volume", a large warehouse-like motion-capture stage with LED video screens and tracking cameras spread throughout the space. Using a combination of physical set pieces and images projected onto the screens, the Volume allows the actors to be filmed and placed into a digital environment. Burr's scenes on Ran Malk's space station were among the scenes filmed on the Volume. Burr described the filming technology as "next-level", and said the moving background imagery occasionally made him feel dizzy, or as if he was experiencing vertigo.

During filming, Burr was only provided the scripts for the portions of the episode in which he was specifically featured. Burr called filming The Mandalorian an "amazing experience" and said the way it was shot was "really, really fun". He was also particularly impressed by the director of the episode, Rick Famuyiwa, who he said "crushed it". Burr believed The Mandalorian more closely resembled a Spaghetti Western than a traditional work of science fiction, saying: "This isn't your dad's Star Wars". On Burr's last filming day, Jon Favreau invited him to see the newly-complete trailer for The Mandalorian, which very much impressed Burr.

== Reception ==
Immediately after "Chapter 6: The Prisoner" was made available on Disney+, multiple fans were discussing and praising Mayfeld and Burr's performance on social media outlets, particularly on Twitter. Armaan Babu of MEA WorldWide wrote: "Twitter was all abuzz with Bill Burr's performance as the fast-talking mercenary". The character of Mayfeld received a generally positive response from reviewers, with many complimenting Burr's performance. Sam Stone of Comic Book Resources called Mayfeld a "fan-favorite" and a "memorable character", praising Burr's "irascible performance". Screen Rant writer Kevin Pantoja called Mayfeld "arguably the highlight" of his episode, a fun character who infused some comedy into the series. He also praised the performance of Burr, who he described as "always entertaining", and said he would like to see more of Mayfeld on The Mandalorian in the future. Dan Brooks, a writer with The Mandalorian production company Lucasfilm, felt Burr delivered a "great performance" as Mayfeld, saying he infused the character with a "unpredictable schoolyard-bully air". Screen Rant writer Ben Sherlock called Mayfeld an interesting antihero and a "character to remember", saying he was portrayed "brilliantly" by Burr. Looper writer Brian Boone said Burr and his "acerbic, motor-mouthed stand-up" was a perfect fit for Mayfeld.

Variety writer Will Thorne wrote that Burr "brought a much-needed injection of spunk and peril to the series". Armaan Babu said Mayfeld maintained Burr's comedic stylings and wrote: "However brief, Bill Burr's appearance left everyone smiling." Sarah Moran of Screen Rant said the fact that Burr is not a Star Wars fan in real-life "only makes his role on The Mandalorian all the funnier". Fatherly writer Ryan Britt said Mayfeld had the best jokes of the episode, made all the more amusing because, as a non-Star Wars fan, Britt said that Burr probably did not even understand the jokes himself. Entertainment Weekly writer Anthony Breznican, referring to Burr's roots in the Boston area, said the actor brought "not just the distinctive voice of his hometown to the screen, but also the general Masshole attitude" to the part of Mayfeld. Comicbook.com writer Charlie Ridgely said Mayfeld had several great jokes throughout his episode. Forbes writer Dani Di Placido described Mayfeld as Burr essentially "playing a Star Wars version of himself".

Not all reviews were positive. IGN writer Joe Skrebels called Mayfeld a "pretty flat villainous leader". Tom Foster of TV Overmind called Burr a "skilled actor", but felt Mayfeld was an underdeveloped character and that the dialogue in the screenplay was too quick and vague. IndieWire writer Tyler Hersko said Burr is funny and talented, but that "the episode's writing unfortunately gives him little to work with, and that Mayfeld does little more than insult the Mandalorian for his entire running time. Megan Crouse Den of Geek wrote that Mayfeld and the other characters in his crew "didn't work for me because I didn't believe in them as mercenaries. They're so hapless." Several reviewers wrote that the entire mercenary crew, including Mayfeld, was generally incompetent and unintelligent throughout the episode. Comic Book Resources writer Renaldo Matadeen called them the "dumbest" criminals in the Star Wars universe, with "a low IQ and no sense of tactics or strategy, leaving us wondering how they got this far in the first place". Nick Mangione of Geek.com wrote "The first hint that this won't be just a standard heist storyline is that all these people suck. They are all the worst. As soon as the crew is introduced you never want to see any of them again."

Mayfeld was ranked eighth on a Screen Rant list of the 10 most interesting characters from the first season of The Mandalorian. He also ranked ninth on a separate Screen Rant list of the 10 best characters introduced on the show, and fourth on a list of "10 Characters We Hope To See Return In Season 2". Additionally, his costume and backpack with the retractable blaster arm ranked ninth on Screen Rant's list of the ten best costumes in the show's first season. Mayfeld was also included on a list by Vulture of the 15 best cameo appearances on The Mandalorian, and ranked tenth on a list by the Los Angeles Times of the best "scene partners" for the Child.

Burr said he got a "great response" from his fans in response to his portrayal of Mayfeld. Despite his past mockery of Star Wars, Burr said he is a fan of The Mandalorian and has watched the episodes even without his character featured, saying: "The way they're doing this one, it's awesome". Burr received a significant amount of mock outrage from fans of The Mandalorian for a scene in which Mayfeld dropped the Child, the show's hugely popular breakout character colloquially known as "Baby Yoda". Jackson McHenry of Vulture wrote: "My man dropped Baby Yoda, and we cannot stand for that." Burr said fans were "breaking my balls" about the scene on Twitter, and he jokingly responded to the issue on his podcast, Monday Morning Podcast:

I didn't drop the Baby Yoda. The fucking robot dude came out of hyperspace and he didn't tell anybody. Alright? Until you're in hyperspace holding a fucking baby and some robot – like that's not unsettling enough — is driving the fucking thing and slams on the brakes, let's see how you do. Walk a mile in my fucking space slippers before you fucking come at me.
