= Mandalorian (character) =

Star Wars character

Din Djarin / The Mandalorian
- Star Wars character
- Pedro Pascal as Din Djarin / the Mandalorian
- First appearance: "Chapter 1: The Mandalorian"; The Mandalorian; (2019)
- Created by: Jon Favreau
- Based on: Mandalorians by George Lucas
- Portrayed by: Pedro Pascal; Aidan Bertola (young)
- Voiced by: Pedro Pascal; Gavin Hammon (Lego Star Wars: The Mandalorian)
- Body doubles: Brendan Wayne; Lateef Crowder; Barry Lowin

In-universe information
- Full name: Din Djarin
- Nickname: Mando
- Species: Human
- Title: The Mandalorian
- Occupation: Bounty hunter
- Affiliation: Mandalorians; Children of the Watch; Bounty Hunter's Guild; Clan Mudhorn; New Republic (Independent Contractor); Adelphi Rangers
- Weapon: IB-94 blaster; Amban phase-pulse blaster; Whistling bird; JTZ-18 jetpack; Beskar spear; The Darksaber; Preceded by: Moff Gideon; Succeeded by: Bo-Katan Kryze
- Children: Din Grogu (adoptive son)
- Homeworld: Aq Vetina; Concordia (adoptive)

Din Djarin (pronounced /dɪn ˈdʒɑːrɪn/), known as the Mandalorian, or Mando for short, is a character in the Star Wars franchise, who appears as the titular protagonist of the Disney+ television series The Mandalorian and also appears in its spin-off The Book of Boba Fett. Orphaned as a young child, the Mandalorian was adopted into the Mandalorian culture and trained as a warrior, later becoming a bounty hunter and taking the title of his people as a sobriquet. The character is rarely seen without his silver beskar helmet, which he is forbidden by creed to remove publicly.

The Mandalorian creator and showrunner Jon Favreau created the character, partially inspired by Clint Eastwood and his Man with No Name character in the spaghetti western Dollars Trilogy films directed by Sergio Leone. The samurai films of Akira Kurosawa (which also inspired Leone's works) were another inspiration, and Star Wars protagonist Han Solo also influenced the character's portrayal. The Mandalorian is portrayed by Pedro Pascal. Favreau approached him for the role, and close friend and fellow actor Oscar Isaac, who portrays Poe Dameron in various Star Wars media, encouraged him to accept the part.

Originally hired to capture Grogu, a Force-sensitive infant of the same species as Yoda, the Mandalorian instead protects him from a remnant of the fallen Galactic Empire and becomes a father figure for him. The dynamic between the Mandalorian and Grogu embodies a theme of parenting and fatherhood prevalent throughout The Mandalorian. The character and Pascal's performance were well received by critics, although some criticism was directed at the fact that Pascal's face is constantly concealed by the costume, comparing him to Master Chief from Halo.

== Appearances ==
=== Backstory ===
The Mandalorian's birth name is Din Djarin, though that is not revealed until "Chapter 8: Redemption", the first-season finale of The Mandalorian. Aspects of the character's backstory are provided gradually throughout the show. As a child, his parents (of the family name "Din") are killed during an attack by battle droids affiliated with the Separatist Alliance during the Clone Wars. Multiple civilians are killed during the attack, and Djarin's parents hide him just before dying in an explosion. Djarin himself is rescued by a tribe of Mandalorian warriors, and he is later adopted into their culture as a "foundling", an orphan raised in the Mandalorian tradition despite not coming from the planet of Mandalore. He joins a tribe led by the Armorer (Emily Swallow), and the clan is forced into hiding due to persecution at the hands of the Galactic Empire.

The Mandalorian never removes his helmet in front of others, because the creed of his tribe sees it as a betrayal worthy of expulsion; other characters from different Mandalorian tribes in other Star Wars works have been depicted as able to remove their helmets without it affecting their status. This inconsistency is later resolved in "Chapter 11: The Heiress", where it is discovered the Mandalorian and his tribe are, specifically, "Child[ren] of the Watch", a sect of Mandalorian religious zealots who follows "the (ancient) Way (of the Mandalore)", which mainstream Mandalorian society does not. The Mandalorian eventually becomes a bounty hunter and joins the Bounty Hunters' Guild, and becomes widely known by the nickname "Mando". At some point before the events of The Mandalorian, he works with a group of mercenaries that include Ran Malk (Mark Boone Junior), Xi'an (Natalia Tena), and Qin (Ismael Cruz Córdova). He eventually splits from this group under non-amicable circumstances, for which they blame him. The Mandalorian pilots a gunship called the Razor Crest, and one of his primary weapons is an Amban sniper rifle, which has a prong-shaped barrel that fires bursts powerful enough to disintegrate its targets. The events of The Mandalorian begin five years after the conclusion of the original trilogy in the film Return of the Jedi (1983).

=== Season One ===
In the series premiere, the Mandalorian accepts a commission from Bounty Hunters' Guild leader Greef Karga (Carl Weathers) to collect a 50-year-old "asset" for a mysterious unnamed Client (Werner Herzog), who represents a remnant of the now-fallen Galactic Empire. The Mandalorian tracks the asset to Arvala-7, where he is aided by the Ugnaught farmer Kuiil (Nick Nolte). After reluctantly partnering with the bounty hunter droid IG-11 (Taika Waititi), the Mandalorian discovers that the asset is an infant seemingly from Yoda's species, known as "the Child". In "Chapter 2: The Child", the Mandalorian is nearly killed by a large Mudhorn creature, but the Child uses the Force to help the Mandalorian to kill it. The Mandalorian successfully delivers the Child to the Client on the planet Nevarro in "Chapter 3: The Sin".

Later, the Mandalorian has an uncharacteristic change of heart and returns to the Client's base to rescue the Child. On the way back to the Razor Crest, the Mandalorian is ambushed by Greef and other Guild members, but he escapes Nevarro after receiving aid from other Mandalorians from his tribe. While hiding from bounty hunters seeking him and the Child, the Mandalorian takes several missions to make ends meet. They include protecting a Sorgan village from raiders in "Chapter 4: Sanctuary", capturing the assassin Fennec Shand (Ming-Na Wen) on Tatooine in "Chapter 5: The Gunslinger", and a prison raid with Ran Malk's mercenaries, led by Migs Mayfeld (Bill Burr), in "Chapter 6: The Prisoner".

In the penultimate first-season episode, Greef contacts the Mandalorian and says the Client's troops have overrun his town. Greef promises to cancel the bounty on the Mandalorian if he helps eliminate the Client. The Mandalorian recruits several allies for the mission, including Kuiil, IG-11, and ex-Rebel shock trooper Cara Dune (Gina Carano). However, when they confront the Client on Nevarro, they are ambushed by Moff Gideon (Giancarlo Esposito) and his death trooper-led regiment, who kill The Client and trap the Mandalorian's allies. Gideon reveals secret details about each of them, including the Mandalorian's birth name, "Din Djarin", confirming that Gideon was involved in a past assault against the Mandalorians known as the "Purge of Mandalore."

Kuiil is killed, and the Mandalorian is severely injured during a gunfight with Gideon's forces in the season finale. IG-11 briefly removes the Mandalorian's helmet to tend to his wounds, revealing his face for the first time in the show. The Mandalorian and his allies seek help from the Mandalorian's tribe, only to find Imperials have wiped out the covert. They find the tribe's leader, the Armorer, who formally adopts the Child into the Mandalorian culture as a foundling. She instructs the Mandalorian to seek out and deliver the Child to the others of his kind, and says the Mandalorian will be like a father to him. IG-11 sacrifices himself to help the others escape, and the Mandalorian fends off a final attack by Gideon before departing from Nevarro with the Child.

=== Season Two ===
In the second season, the character searches for other Mandalorians to help him find the Child's people: the Jedi. In "Chapter 9: The Marshal", he learns of a Mandalorian supposedly living on Tatooine from his contact, Gor Koresh (John Leguizamo). On Tatooine, the Mandalorian meets Cobb Vanth (Timothy Olyphant), the Marshal of Mos Pelgo, who is wearing Mandalorian armor bought from Jawas, which he had been using to protect the townspeople from various threats. Although the two are initially at odds, as the Mandalorian demands Vanth to give him the armor, they become reluctant allies when Mos Pelgo is attacked by a krayt dragon, which the Mandalorian agrees to help slay in exchange for Vanth's armor. Along the way, the Mandalorian and Vanth develop a genuine friendship and form an uneasy alliance between the townspeople of Mos Pelgo and a tribe of Tusken Raiders to kill the dragon. Afterward, the Mandalorian retrieves Vanth's armor, and the two part on good terms.

In "Chapter 10: The Passenger", the Mandalorian takes on a mission to take a contact, "Frog Lady" (Misty Rosas, voiced by Dee Bradley Baker), and her eggs from Tatooine to Trask, in exchange for a lead on other Mandalorians. During their journey, they are intercepted by two X-wing pilots (Dave Filoni and Paul Sun-Hyung Lee) from the New Republic, who have an arrest warrant for the Mandalorian for his role in the prison break from "Chapter 6", but they end up saving them from a swarm of spider-like creatures on Maldo Kreis, where they crash-landed, and the charges are dropped against the Mandalorian. After fixing the Razor Crest to the point of barely being able to fly, the Mandalorian completes his mission and brings the Frog Lady to Trask in "Chapter 11: The Heiress", whereupon her husband directs him to an inn from where he learns about three Mandalorians spotted on the moon. A crew of Quarrens offers to lead him to them but ends up betraying and attempting to kill him and the Child for the Mandalorian's armor. The pair are saved by the three Mandalorians, led by Bo-Katan Kryze (Katee Sackhoff), the former ruler of Mandalore, who lost both her planet and the Darksaber to Moff Gideon. The Mandalorian initially distrusts her, but he nonetheless agrees to help her and her team raid an Imperial freighter for stolen Mandalorian relics in exchange for a lead on the Jedi. Following the heist, Bo-Katan tells the Mandalorian to seek out her old Jedi ally, Ahsoka Tano (Rosario Dawson), on Corvus.

In "Chapter 12: The Siege", the Mandalorian reunites on Nevarro with Greef Karga and Cara Dune, who have since turned the planet around, and agrees to help them raid the last Imperial base on the planet in exchange for repairs to the Razor Crest. During the raid, they stumble upon cloning experiments performed by Imperial scientists, involving the Child's blood, some of which has already been transfused to the clones to supposedly give them Force-sensitivity. Before they can learn more, they are forced to destroy the base and escape from the pursuing Imperial forces.

In "Chapter 13: The Jedi", with the Razor Crest repaired, the Mandalorian travels to Corvus and is brought before Morgan Elsbeth (Diana Lee Inosanto), the Imperial Magistrate of the city of Calidan, who hires him to kill Ahsoka. Under the guise of accepting the bounty, the Mandalorian tracks down Ahsoka, who uses the Force to commune with the Child, learning that his name is Grogu, that he is a former Jedi youngling who was rescued from the Jedi Temple on Coruscant during the Great Jedi Purge, and that he has been suppressing his Force powers over the years to survive. With Ahsoka reluctant to train Grogu because of his strong attachment to the Mandalorian, the latter helps Ahsoka defeat Elsbeth and liberate Calidan in the hopes of changing her mind. Although still reluctant, Ahsoka points the Mandalorian to a Jedi Temple on Tython, where Grogu might reach out to another Jedi through the Force and choose his destiny.

In "Chapter 14: The Tragedy", the Mandalorian takes Grogu to the Jedi Temple and leaves him to meditate. He is confronted by Boba Fett (Temuera Morrison), the original owner of the Mandalorian armor he retrieved from Vanth, and his new partner, Fennec Shand, whom Fett had rescued after she was left to die in "Chapter 5". The Mandalorian agrees to trade the armor for Grogu's safety, but the group is attacked by Gideon's Imperial remnant, which has followed the Mandalorian via a tracking beacon that had been placed on the Razor Crest during its repairs on Nevarro. Despite assistance from Fett and Shand, Grogu is captured by Gideon's forces, and the Razor Crest is destroyed by an orbital strike from Gideon's cruiser. Looking for additional allies to help him rescue Grogu, the Mandalorian meets with Cara Dune and asks her to release Mayfeld, who has been sent to a New Republic prison after his capture in "Chapter 6".

In "Chapter 15: The Believer", the Mandalorian and Mayfeld, whom Cara has temporarily remanded into her custody, infiltrate a hidden Imperial rhydonium refinery on Morak disguised as Imperial soldiers to discover Moff Gideon's whereabouts. During their mission, the Mandalorian is forced to remove his helmet to access the terminal with Gideon's coordinates. After Mayfeld blows their cover by killing his former commanding officer for callously dismissing the victims of Operation: Cinder, (Note: Operation: Cinder was an Imperial protocol, most prominently featured in Star Wars: Battlefront II, which saw the devastation of several Imperial-controlled planets after the Battle of Endor.) he and the Mandalorian make their escape, boarding Fett's gunship, Slave I, before Mayfeld destroys the refinery with a well-placed sniper shot. Cara promises to report that he was killed as a reward for his assistance, and Mayfeld leaves the group. Afterward, the Mandalorian sends Gideon a threatening message, in which he twists Gideon's words from "Chapter 7" and vows to rescue Grogu.

The Mandalorian without his helmet as seen in "Chapter 16: The Rescue"

In "Chapter 16: The Rescue", the Mandalorian raids Gideon's cruiser to rescue Grogu, joined by his allies, as well as Bo-Katan and her Mandalorian warriors, to whom he promised to help liberate Mandalore from Imperial occupation in return. For the team to breach the hangar, they are helped by Boba Fett who stages an assault on the stolen Imperial Shuttle where the crew was. They successfully breach the hangar. While his allies go for the ship's command bridge, the Mandalorian searches for Grogu, narrowly defeating one of Gideon's Dark Troopers and launching the rest into space. Afterward, he confronts Gideon, who is holding the child hostage. Gideon offers to hand Grogu over if the Mandalorian lets him escape and keep the Darksaber, but then betrays and attempts to kill him. The Mandalorian rescues Grogu and overpowers Gideon, thus becoming the rightful owner of the Darksaber. Unaware of wielding the Darksaber, the Mandalorian enters the command bridge where Bo-Katan and crew were waiting. It was revealed that one who wields the Darksaber after combat becomes the rightful ruler of Mandalore. Before Bo-Katan and the Mandalorian engage in battle, they are interrupted by the Dark Troopers' return. They are swiftly destroyed by Luke Skywalker (Mark Hamill), a Jedi who responded to Grogu's call on Tython and offers to take the child to be trained as a Jedi. During an emotional farewell, the Mandalorian removes his helmet to let the child see his face for the first time. He then tearfully watches as Grogu departs with Skywalker.

=== The Book of Boba Fett ===
The Mandalorian appears in the spin-off series The Book of Boba Fett. In "Chapter 5: Return of the Mandalorian", the Mandalorian has resumed bounty hunting but finds himself struggling with wielding the Darksaber while still reeling from Grogu's absence. He kills the Klatoonian crime boss Kaba Baiz in his meat-packing plant and delivers his head to an Ishl Tib guild master on the ringed-shaped space station Glavis in exchange for directions, which is revealed to be the Tribe's relocated covert, hidden beneath the city. The Mandalorian reunites with the Armorer and fellow Tribe member Paz Vizsla at their new enclave and recounts his adventures to the Armorer, who explains the Darksaber's history to him and begins training him on properly using the black-bladed lightsaber. Vizsla challenges the Mandalorian for the Darksaber and the right to rule Mandalore. The Mandalorian wins the duel but when he confesses that he broke the Creed by removing his helmet in front of others in both "Chapter 15: The Believer" and "Chapter 16: The Rescue", Vizsla denounces him as an apostate while the Armorer has him expelled from the Tribe. However, she informs him that the only way of atonement is to come into contact with the water in the Mines of Mandalore, but they have been destroyed by the Empire during the Purge. The Mandalorian leaves the covert but is allowed to keep his armor and the Darksaber. Taking a commercial shuttle to Tatooine, the Mandalorian visits Peli Motto, who presents him a modified Naboo N-1 starfighter as a replacement for the Razor Crest. After a test run, the Mandalorian is approached by Fennec Shand on behalf of Boba Fett, now the self-proclaimed Daimyo of Tatooine, for assistance in Fett's upcoming war with the Pyke Syndicate. The Mandalorian accepts the job for free but only after he visits Grogu.

In "Chapter 6: From the Desert Comes a Stranger", the Mandalorian travels to a forested planet where Grogu has begun his Jedi training under Skywalker. He is reunited with Ahsoka Tano, who advises him against seeing Grogu, as it would hinder his training due to the Jedi's strict rules against personal attachments. The Mandalorian reluctantly returns to Tatooine but bequeaths Ahsoka a gift to give to Grogu: beskar chain mail forged by the Armorer from the beskar spear that Ahsoka had previously given him. At Fett's Palace, Shand notes their shorthanded manpower, and the Mandalorian travels to Mos Pelgo, now renamed Freetown, to enlist Cobb Vanth and the townspeople to bolster Fett's forces. Although reluctant to get involved in the upcoming war, Vanth agrees to hold a town hall meeting.

In "Chapter 7: In the Name of Honor", the Mandalorian regroups with Fett and Shand at the destroyed Sanctuary cantina and prepares to engage the Pykes in Mos Espa. Cad Bane (Corey Burton) arrives with many Pyke soldiers and reveals that he shot Vanth after the Mandalorian approached him, thus preventing any reinforcements from helping Fett. The Mandalorian and Fett make use of their jetpacks and armor to engage the Pykes but are nearly overwhelmed until they are backed up by Fett's forces and the citizens of Freetown. Motto also arrives with Grogu, who reveals that he accepted the Mandalorian's chain mail, therefore forgoing his training as a Jedi to be with the Mandalorian. When the Pykes set two armored droids upon the group, the Mandalorian destroys one of them with the Darksaber. Bane scares off Fett's rancor, causing it to go berserk in the town. The Mandalorian attempts to subdue the rancor, but is nearly killed until Grogu uses the Force to put it to sleep. Afterward, the Mandalorian and Grogu depart Tatooine in the N-1 starfighter.

=== Season Three ===
In "Chapter 17: The Apostate", the Mandalorian receives a green glass brought from the surface of Mandalore and travels with Grogu to a new planet the covert has relocated to, where the Armorer reiterates that until the Mandalorian bathes in the Living Waters of the mines, he is still considered an apostate. Needing a trustworthy droid to analyze the air in Mandalore's ruins, the Mandalorian and Grogu return to Nevarro to repair IG-11 from his salvaged parts but he and Greef are forced to destroy IG-11 again when the revived droid defaults to his original programming. As IG-11's memory core cannot be repaired, the Mandalorian elects to find a new one, leaving Nevarro with Grogu before engaging in a dogfight with Pirate King Gorian Shard's (Nonso Anozie) fleet. The two travel to Kalevala and meet with Bo-Katan, who has given up her plans to retake Mandalore ever since the Mandalorian won the Darksaber. Bo-Katan reveals the location of the mines.

In "Chapter 18: The Mines of Mandalore", the Mandalorian's search for a memory core brings him back to Tatooine. Peli Motto is unable to provide him with one but offers him R5-D4 instead. He heads to Mandalore with Grogu and R5-D4, and discovers that the atmosphere is breathable. He heads below Sundari, in search for the mines, and is attacked by a cyborg creature. He is held hostage, and asks Grogu to find Bo-Katan. She arrives soon thereafter, killing the creature by stabbing him with the Darksaber. She later leads him to the Mines of Mandalore, again stating that she does not believe in the stories. The Mandalorian bathes himself, but falls into a chasm and is knocked unconscious. Bo-Katan saves him from drowning and discovers a living mythosaur in the Waters.

In "Chapter 19: The Convert", the Mandalorian recovers and leaves Mandalore with Grogu and Bo-Katan, who withholds the mythosaur's existence from him. The trio are attacked by Imperial starships at Kalevala, and despite the Mandalorian providing backup in his N-1, TIE bombers destroy Bo-Katan's castle. They are forced to flee the planet and seek refuge at his tribe's covert. The Mandalorian presents the Armorer with a sample of the Living Waters and with Bo-Katan as a witness he is declared redeemed by his tribe. Bo-Katan is invited into the tribe as she has bathed in the Living Waters to rescue the Mandalorian and has not removed her helmet since. In "Chapter 20: The Foundling", the Mandalorian oversees Grogu's training as a foundling and joins Bo-Katan's rescue party when Paz Viszla's son Ragnar is abducted by a large winged raptor.

"Chapter 21: The Pirate", New Republic Captain Carson Teva (Paul Sun-Hyung Lee) visits the covert and informs the Mandalorian that Nevarro has been invaded by Shard and his pirates. The Mandalorian convinces the convert to come to Karga's aid and they successfully liberate Nevarro. Out of gratitude, Karga gifts the covert the lands previously offered to the Mandalorian and welcomes them amongst the townspeople. In "Chapter 22: Guns for Hire", the Mandalorian and Bo-Katan head to Plazir-15 in search of Bo-Katan's Mandalorian army, which is now led by Axe Woves. He returns the Darksaber to Bo-Katan, as she defeated the cyborg creature that defeated him.

In "Chapter 23: The Spies", the Mandalorian returns to Nevarro and Greef gifts him IG-12, a rebuilt IG-11 who serves as a mech suit for Grogu. He then heads to Mandalore with members of both Mandalorian tribes. They, with the help of survivors of the purge, are led to the Great Forge. There they encounter Moff Gideon, who captures the Mandalorian and brings him to the debriefing room.

In "Chapter 24: The Return", the Mandalorian escapes from the guards with assistance from Grogu and seeks out Moff Gideon. After a lengthy skirmish between the Mandalorians and the beskar-enhanced stormtroopers within the base, Bo-Katan and the Mandalorian make a final stand against Moff Gideon. As Gideon targets Grogu, the fallen flagship destroys the base with the resulting blast consuming Gideon. Grogu protects Bo-Katan and the Mandalorian from the blast with a Force barrier. After the battle, the Mandalorians restart the Great Forge at the heart of Mandalore. The Mandalorian formally adopts Grogu as "Din Grogu", takes up honest contract work with Teva ahead of taking Grogu on his "trials" (as promised to the Armorer), and retires to the homestead on Nevarro (as previously promised by Karga).

=== The Mandalorian and Grogu ===
At Disney's first quarter 2024 earnings call, CEO Bob Iger announced that a new Star Wars film was being developed "that brings the Mandalorian and Grogu to the big screen for the very first time." Directed by Jon Favreau and co written by Favreau and Dave Filoni, The Mandalorian and Grogu was released in theaters on May 22, 2026.

Sometime later, the Mandalorian and Grogu, now serving the New Republic, continue hunting the remnants of the Galactic Empire, despite the Mandalorian's efforts being seen as messy by Rebel commander Ward. In one mission, the Mandalorian and Grogu become thrust into rescuing Rotta the Hutt, the son of Jabba the Hutt, who could provide information about the Empire enforcer Coin.

=== Other media ===
The Mandalorian appears in the mobile role-playing game, Star Wars: Galaxy of Heroes as two different playable characters based on the character without and with his Beskar Armor, respectively: "The Mandalorian", and "The Mandalorian (Beskar Armor)".

The Mandalorian appears in DLC for Lego Star Wars: The Skywalker Saga.

As part of the Fortnite Battle Royale Chapter 2 Season 5 Battle Pass, The Mandalorian appeared as a wearable cosmetic for players featuring customisable Beskar Armour styles.

== Characterization ==
The Mandalorian is a tough, resourceful, and efficient warrior. He is fast and accurate with a blaster, and few other characters in the series can match him in hand-to-hand combat, one being Cara Dune. The Mandalorian is methodical when he fights, hunting and isolating his enemies and picking them off one-by-one. He is something of a lone wolf and often works alone, and yet is also willing to accept assistance from others. He accepts help from Kuiil several times throughout the first season, and attempts to reward him for this assistance. He also offers to work with IG-11 to capture the Child in the series premiere.

The Mandalorian seldom speaks, and when he does he reveals little information beyond what is necessary. Pedro Pascal, the actor who portrays the Mandalorian, said he attempts to make the character human and accessible, despite the fact that his face is concealed by a mask. He said of this: "The idea is, he's relatable. We're all kind of covered in our own armor and terrified of taking that armor off, and that's the thing that crosses him over into a character that we're really going to want to follow." The Atlantic writer Spencer Kornhaber said the Mandalorian is one of many characters in the Star Wars franchise who wear masks because masks are "the means by which people try to attain the perfection, and indifference, of machines". Kornhaber said when the Mandalorian's helmet is finally removed for the first time, it is not presented as a major epiphany or the reveal of a secret identity, but rather "a reminder that this laconic space cowboy/knight is just some guy".

The character takes Mandalorian traditions very seriously, and has tremendous respect and gratitude for the Mandalorian culture due to his upbringing, which he reflects by providing money from his bounties to support other foundlings. His parents' deaths at the hands of battle droids also left him with a strong hatred of droids in general.

Pascal believes the Mandalorian is more morally ambiguous than other Star Wars protagonists, describing him as a "dark hero". He said: "I think the moral universe of Star Wars can be very specific and kind of black and white, there's good and there's evil, and in this one we start to play with the boundaries of that more, and that is dealt with very interestingly with this character. He's not your typical hero." Ultimately, Pascal believes the Mandalorian wants to do the right thing, but that his duties as a bounty hunter and warrior often conflict with that. Carl Weathers said of the character: "The Mandalorian is, I think, in some ways like every other character in The Mandalorian. There is something about him that's very selfish and self-centered but there's also something about him that's very altruistic and human. There's a humanity to him." At the beginning of the series in particular, the Mandalorian has a cold personality, ignoring the pleas of the people he hunted and captured. The fact that the Mandalorian used to work with Ran Malk's crew of mercenaries before the events of The Mandalorian shows he had even fewer morals before the series began. This is further illustrated in "Chapter 6: The Prisoner", when one of those mercenaries, Xi'an, alludes to violent acts the Mandalorian committed on the planet Alzoc III, something the Mandalorian is reluctant to discuss. However, the introduction of the Child in "Chapter 1: The Mandalorian" serves to humanize and moralize the Mandalorian. The Mandalorian creator Jon Favreau and Deborah Chow, one of the directors on The Mandalorian, felt the scene in "Chapter 3: The Sin" when the Mandalorian decided to go back to the Child was a pivotal moment for the character. Chow said: "That's the point of no return, once he makes that decision. Right there, he's changing his entire life." The Mandalorian's growth in morality is demonstrated in "Chapter 6" when he attempts to intervene to save the life of New Republic soldier Davan (Matt Lanter) during a prison break, even though it would be more convenient to kill him. Also in that episode, the Mandalorian imprisons rather than kills his fellow mercenaries after they betray him, which further demonstrates his moral conscience.

== Concept and creation ==
=== Conception ===
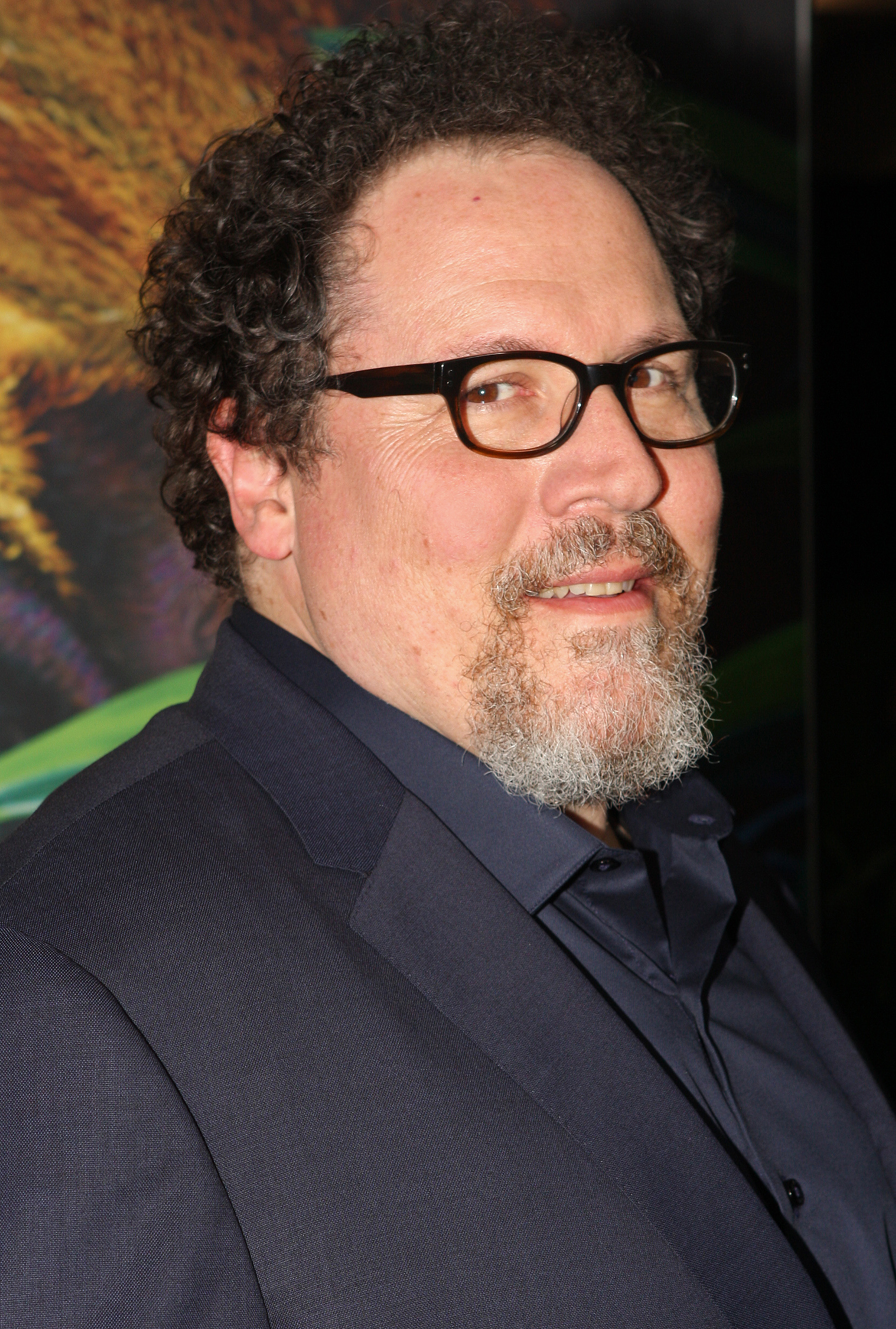
The Mandalorian character was created by Jon Favreau, the creator and showrunner of The Mandalorian.

The Mandalorian character was created by Jon Favreau, the creator and showrunner of The Mandalorian. Favreau is a long-time Star Wars fan and the Mandalorians are one of his favorite groups of characters from the franchise; he previously voiced one of them in the animated series Star Wars: The Clone Wars. The title character of Favreau's series is considered the first live-action depiction of a Mandalorian, the concept of which was never used in the films, although the Mandalorian culture has been expanded upon in other Star Wars works like The Clone Wars and Star Wars Rebels. Boba Fett has been associated with the Mandalorians in Star Wars books and other media, but that detail was never featured in the films. Favreau said in creating the Mandalorian character, he attempted to match the look and aesthetics of the original Star Wars trilogy, particularly the first film, Star Wars (1977). Several Lucasfilm artists created concept art for the character during development of the series, including Christan Alzmann, Doug Chiang, Ryan Church, Nick Gindraux, Jama Jurabaev, and John Park.

The character was partially inspired by Clint Eastwood, particularly his Man with No Name character in Spaghetti Western films directed by Sergio Leone. Pascal said any time he had a question or doubt about how his character would physically act or move, he would ask himself: "What would Clint do?" The Mandalorian was also inspired by samurai characters in the films of Japanese director Akira Kurosawa. Pascal said of the Kurosawa influence: "It's aesthetically and very, very much narratively built in that kind of iconic lone gunslinger/sword-wielder." Favreau suggested Pascal watch Kurosawa's samurai films and Leone's westerns starring Eastwood as preparation for the role, and Pascal watched such specific films as Yojimbo (1961) and The Good, the Bad and the Ugly (1966). Han Solo, of the main characters from the Star Wars franchise, also served as an influence for Pascal's performance.

The Mandalorian character was first publicly described in a brief three-sentence synopsis about the series that Favreau posted on his Instagram account on October 3, 2018. It described the character as "a lone gunfighter in the outer reaches of the galaxy far from the authority of the New Republic". Favreau later said: "This is a character you've never met before in a period of time you've never seen." The first image of the Mandalorian was released on October 4, 2018. The gender and other details about the character were not immediately revealed. Based upon the released photo, Germain Lussier of Gizmodo described the character as "an imposing, confident presence, with a great mix of Mandalorian armor and personal, functional additions". The Mandalorian executive producer Dave Filoni called the Mandalorian a "survivor" just trying to make a living and "find his way on a day-to-day basis", which he felt was unique from other protagonists in the Star Wars franchise, particular the Jedi. Since the real name and face of the Mandalorian were not initially revealed, many speculated his true identity would be a character already known in the Star Wars franchise. Some speculated it would be Boba Fett himself, but Lucasfilm denied this, and the show's creators differentiated between the two characters in interviews.

Footage of the Mandalorian was first publicly unveiled at the Star Wars Celebration convention in Chicago on April 14, 2019, which included scenes of him receiving bounty hunting assignments from Greef Karga and the Client in the premiere episode. The character was also featured prominently in the first official trailer for The Mandalorian, released on August 23, 2019, and in the second Mandalorian trailer, released on October 28, 2019. A character poster solely featuring the Mandalorian was also released that day.

=== Portrayal ===
==== Pedro Pascal ====
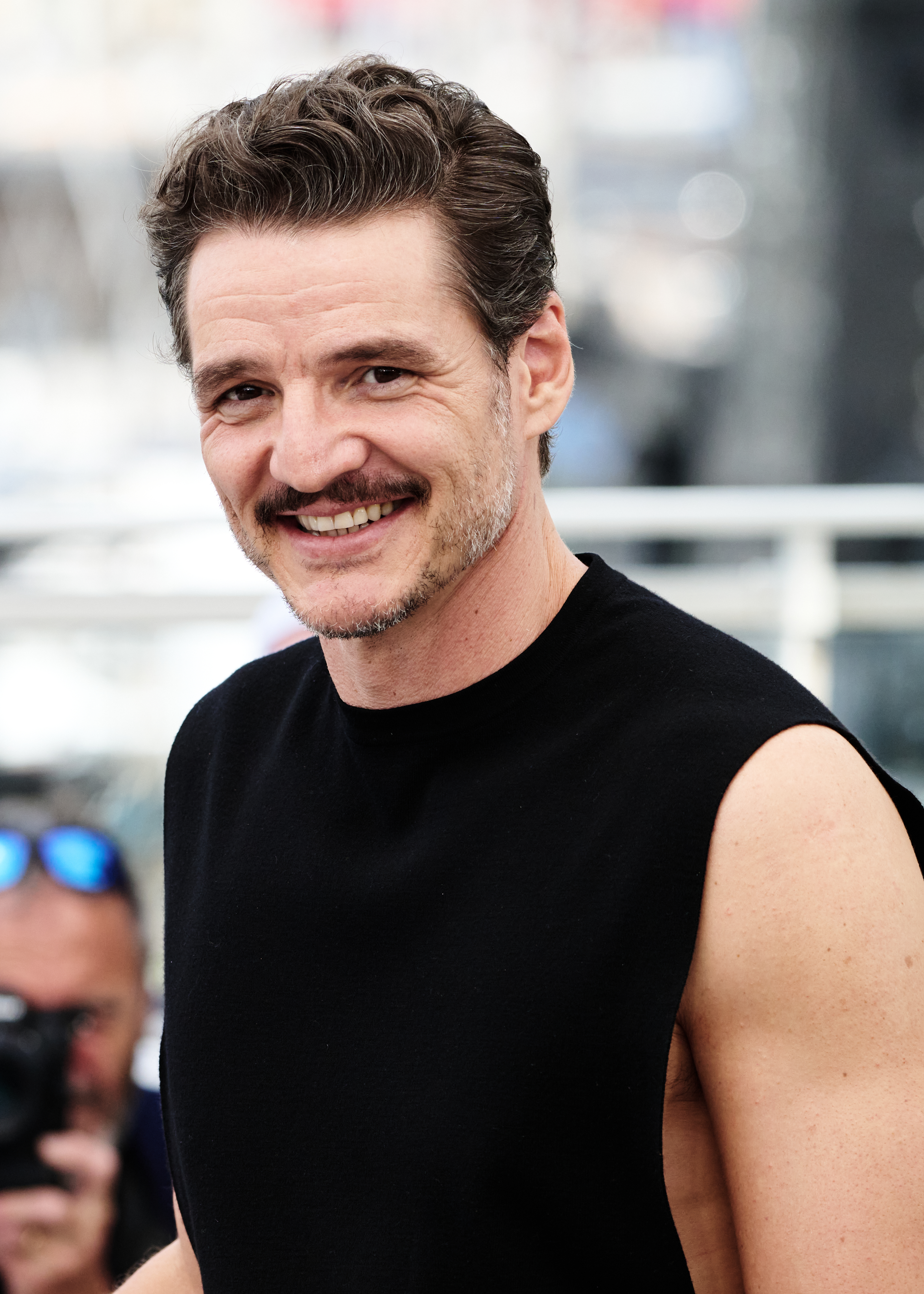
Pedro Pascal portrayed and voiced the title character of The Mandalorian.

The Mandalorian is portrayed by Pedro Pascal, who wears the armor in many scenes and provides all of the voice acting for the character. He was one of several actors considered for the role. Favreau reached out to Pascal through his agent to discuss a Star Wars project; Pascal did not initially know whether it was a film, series, or some other type of work, but he wanted to meet Favreau regardless of the nature of the project. They met in Favreau's office, which was covered with concept illustrations from the series, and as Favreau described the project he pointed to an illustration of the Mandalorian to show Pascal the character he would portray. This led Pascal to initially believe the character was Boba Fett, but he was corrected by Favreau. Pascal tried on the Mandalorian's helmet during their first meeting and it fit perfectly, which he called a "big geek-out moment". Pascal's long-time friend Oscar Isaac, who portrayed Poe Dameron in the Star Wars sequel trilogy, urged Pascal to accept the role, and Pascal said the actor's encouragement made him feel more certain about joining the project.

Pascal was a fan of Star Wars as a child, especially the film The Empire Strikes Back (1980), which he described as "indelibly marked in my memory and my childhood imagination". He was also a fan of Boba Fett in particular, which was his favorite Star Wars action figure as a child. Pascal said this made him all the more excited to be portraying a similar-looking character, saying: "They want me to be the coolest looking thing in Star Wars."

Production had begun in late 2018 and was underway for several weeks before the lead actor to play the Mandalorian was selected. Scenes featuring the character were shot with stand-ins, and publicity stills of the character on the set were released before an actor was selected. Rumors of Pascal's possible casting began to emerge on the Internet in October 2018. On November 13, 2018, Variety reported that Pascal was offered the lead role and that negotiations were underway. His casting was formally announced on December 12, 2018. Germain Lussier of Gizmodo said of Pascal's casting: "Pascal is an excellent actor with a unique presence and we're all for him hunting down and shooting people all across the galaxy." Pascal mistakenly revealed the Mandalorian's real name, Din Djarin, during a November 2019 interview.

==== Other performers ====
In addition to Pascal, actor Brendan Wayne and stunt performer Lateef Crowder served as body doubles for the Mandalorian and perform as the character when Pascal was unavailable. Wayne previously appeared in the film Cowboys & Aliens (2011), which was directed by Favreau, after which they kept in touch. Through his agent, Wayne was asked to try on a costume at Legacy Effects for a secretive project, without any knowledge that it was Star Wars-related. Once he saw the costume, he mistakenly believed it was Boba Fett. The costume fit, even though it was designed for someone 6 feet 5 inches, and he is only six feet tall. Wayne said of the costume: "Just the fact that I got to put it on was enough, because it meant that much to me as part of my childhood." Two weeks later he was asked to do a screen test for a Favreau project. It did not include a script because the casting associates just wanted to see him move around. Suspecting it was related to the Star Wars costume he had tried on, Wayne purchased a Boba Fett helmet and motorcycle pad and practiced walking with them beforehand. In the screen test, he was asked to portray "a very Western kind of feel", so he walked slowly, focused on holding the strength of his core, and adapted a walk similar to that of his grandfather, the actor John Wayne.

Wayne's agent informed him he would not be providing the character's voice, which he did not mind. Wayne said Favreau taught him about how to keep his head movements very subtle because they appear much more exaggerated when masked. Wayne provided feedback and advice about the costume, including where the gun holsters were positioned to give the character the greatest ease of access. Wayne worked on every first-season episode of The Mandalorian, and he worked closely with Pascal to develop the character's on-screen movements, with each asking the other how they would handle certain movements and gestures, to ensure the character was seamless no matter who played him. Wayne said of working on The Mandalorian: "It was a dream to work on this because I was able to live what brought me to acting every day. ... To be part of the mythology that you grew up with that was integral to you as a kid—it was really cool."

Child actor Aidan Bertola portrayed a young version of the Mandalorian in flashback scenes throughout the first season of The Mandalorian.

=== Costume ===
The Mandalorian's costume was designed by concept artist Brian Matyas and costume designer Joseph Porro. and was created by Legacy Effects, the special effects studio started by protégés of special make-up effects creator Stan Winston. It was heavily influenced by the Boba Fett suit featured in The Empire Strikes Back and Return of the Jedi, and includes a similar set of body armor and a helmet with a distinctive T-shaped visor. The costume includes gauntlet-like wrist armor on its right arm, and a wrist device for firing projectiles on the left arm. It features gloves with differently-colored fingertips and a metal piece on the hand with a blue triangle facing the fingers. The costume also includes a belt with explosive charges on it, a blaster with a long barrel, boots, and holsters on the right leg that store ammunition, explosives, and a knife. The first version of the costume was featured in the first three episodes of The Mandalorian included a great deal of wear and battle damage, before it is rebuilt by the Armorer.

The filmmakers deliberately sought to create subtle visual differences between the costumes of Mandalorian and Boba Fett to help differentiate the two characters. As a result, the Mandalorian's costume is a different color than Boba Fett's, the armor and helmet have different accents and subtle touches, and the Mandalorian appears more muscular than Boba Fett. Nevertheless, Dave Filoni has acknowledged "there are similarities, which are almost unavoidable". Pedro Pascal compared the Mandalorian's armor to that of Knights from the Middle Ages, describing its aesthetic as "extremely powerful and mysterious". Pascal also said of the costume: "He's such an incredible silhouette. It's such an iconic image." However, he also said the costume could be difficult to work with, and that he often bumped into things during filming until he got used to it. He said: "Nothing that looks that good is going to be easy to wear." Describing the language of the Mandalorian as "strictly physical", Pascal said he had to learn how to navigate the costume pieces to convey the character and tell his story.

Jessie Atkin of Screen Rant said of the costume: "We might think we've seen Mandalorian armor before, whether on Boba Fett or Sabine Wren, but watching the Armorer make Mando's outfit seems to bring his whole look to a whole different level." The costume was on display at the D23 Expo in Anaheim, California in August 2019.

=== Filming ===
Many of the scenes for The Mandalorian were filmed on a sound stage in Southern California on a "Volume", a large warehouse-like motion-capture stage with green screens and tracking cameras spread throughout the space. Using a combination of physical set pieces and images projected onto the screens, the Volume allows the actors to be filmed and placed into a digital environment. The Mandalorian's scenes on an icy planet at the beginning of "Chapter 1: The Mandalorian" were filmed in this setting, as were scenes on the planet Arvala-7 in the first two episodes of the first season, and the scenes on Ran Malk's space station in "Chapter 6: The Prisoner", to name a few. Pedro Pascal said of the filming process: "This is taking it to the next level for me in terms of the world-building and the attention to detail on the costumes, the creatures, the robots, the entire world. It feels sometimes like not too much is left to the imagination in terms of what's there."

The use of this filming technology, rather than a traditional green screen backdrop, allowed the Mandalorian filmmakers to avoid challenges that would be associated with the reflection of the green screen against the Mandalorian's reflective helmet and armor costume. Imagery was projected onto 360-degree LED walls, which not only provided photorealistic sets for the actors to perform against, but also allowed the reflections that appeared on the Mandalorian's costume to reflect the setting around him as if it were a real-world location. Cinematographer Greig Fraser said: "When you're dealing with a reflective subject like the Mandalorian, the world outside the camera frame is often more important than the world you see in the camera's field of view. What's behind the camera is reflected in the actor's helmet and costume, and that's crucial to selling the illusion that he's in that environment." A long, narrow band of white near the top of the LED wall served an additional purpose of providing a backlight look on the Mandalorian's helmet. The filmmakers would also occasionally request additional lighting be projected onto the wall of the set, so that it would reflect onto the Mandalorian's costume and provide additional definition to the character's shape. Fraser said filming the chrome helmet of the Mandalorian in particular is a challenge because its sharp edges can "quickly look video-like" if the lens on the camera is too sharp. This problem was resolved via the use of full-frame Ultra Vista anamorphic lenses by Panavision that were modified to provide a softer sharpness. These lenses were too soft for human faces, so different filming techniques were used on unmasked characters than those used for the Mandalorian.

Upon first accepting the role, Pascal thought the large amount of enthusiasm among Star Wars fans would prove intimidating, but he later said it ultimately supported his performance: "As a cast member, to have that kind of support to life you into it, is such an essential component—more so than anything I've done before." Pascal felt Jon Favreau and Dave Filoni shielded him and the rest of the cast and crew from the pressures that might otherwise have been associated with filming the first live-action Star Wars series and one of the first shows for the Disney+ streaming service, instead creating an environment where they could focus on the work. Favreau felt the Mandalorian character worked well and was very engaging despite not being seen behind the costume, noting that many beloved Star Wars characters lack anthropomorphism, citing R2-D2 as an example. Gina Carano said Pascal tries to convey his own doubts and vulnerabilities as an actor through his performances, which she felt ultimately makes the Mandalorian more relatable. She said: "You want to know who is this guy underneath here. You can feel his personality, you want to know more about him. He's so sexy." Favreau paid close attention to minor details about the Mandalorian character, including one instance in which he felt the Mandalorian's boots did not have the appropriate level of frost on them for scenes on an icy planet, so he had them modified to include more frost.

Pascal said because the character speaks so seldom, he had to recall his acting school lessons to convey the character's emotions simply with "posture and gesture". Pascal called this a very detail-oriented process, noting that small gestures had a large emotive impact, requiring vigilance about each subtle movement. Pascal said his past stage acting experience also helped with this, including his performances in works of commedia dell'arte, in which he wore masks and delivered performances in animated and exaggerated ways to convey emotions. He said portraying the Mandalorian was similar, but "in the opposite tone of economical movements". Deborah Chow said physicality was extremely important in working with the character, and that they needed to develop a physical language for the Mandalorian: "All his movement is intentional. There's no fidgeting or relaxing, so that any time, even if he makes a small move or turns his head, it becomes meaningful. We couldn't do it with his face or with his eyes." Much of that physicality was dictated by the costume itself and the weight distribution necessary to move in it. Brendan Wayne said the type of walk they wanted for the Mandalorian came naturally to him, so much so that when Pascal struggled with it, the filmmakers would suggest he seek Wayne's input. Pascal tried to match his vocal performance to the body language, and his recordings were often tweaked in post-production to achieve this.

Pascal was working on multiple projects at the same time as The Mandalorian, so he did not appear in every episode. He was not present for the filming of "Chapter 4: Sanctuary" at all because he was in rehearsals for a production of King Lear on Broadway. Instead, Wayne performed the majority of the character's scenes in that episode. Director Bryce Dallas Howard said of Wayne: "He absolutely just brought everything to that character, and we were able to find the moments and figure them out together." Wayne said that episode's scenes with Julia Jones, the actress who played Omera, were so emotional that he cried underneath the helmet. Wayne also wore the costume for portions of "Chapter 3: The Sin", including the scene when he entered the Razor Crest and was jumped by Greef Karga from behind. Wayne idolizes Weathers so he enjoyed filming the scenes with him. Wayne recited the Mandalorian's lines while shooting the scenes, to be replaced with Pascal's vocal performances later, and Weathers said Wayne's delivery was very similar to that of his grandfather John Wayne. Wayne also said the animatronic puppet used to create the Child character was so realistic that it felt like working with an actual child actor.

Pascal and Emily Swallow knew each other prior to filming The Mandalorian. They were familiar with each other through the New York theatre scene, and both appeared on the show The Mentalist at the same time. When she first learned about The Mandalorian, Swallow believed it would be challenging to present a protagonist who viewers never actually saw, but she believed Pascal could do it because "I sort of knew just based on who Pedro is that his goodness would come across".

== Themes ==
One of the primary themes of The Mandalorian is parenting and fatherhood, expressed through the father-son relationship dynamic between the Mandalorian and the Child. Ryan Britt of Fatherly wrote: "For years the Star Wars franchise avoided depicting a parent-child dynamic. With Mando and The Child, that's finally changing." Several reviewers have compared the dynamic between the Child and the Mandalorian to Lone Wolf and Cub, a manga about a samurai warrior and his young son. The Child makes the Mandalorian a softer and more relatable character; he changes in a positive way because of raising the Child, becoming less selfish and self-absorbed. Several examples of the Mandalorian parenting the Child appear throughout the series, such as when he stops the Child from pressing random buttons in the cockpit of the Mandalorian's spaceship, ultimately by holding him in his lap. In another example, the Mandalorian sets up a car seat for the Child in the cockpit of the ship, so he can be seated safely and comfortably during their travels.

The relationship between the Mandalorian and the Child is an example of unexpected fatherhood. The Mandalorian feels a connection and parental bond with the Child because of his own childhood, when he was orphaned by the deaths of his parents and was adopted by the Mandalorians as a "foundling". Nevertheless, fatherhood was not a role the Mandalorian was initially seeking, and he makes repeated early attempts to avoid this responsibility. He first does so in "Chapter 3: The Sin", when he leaves the Child with the Client, and then again in "Chapter 4" Sanctuary", when he plans to leave the Child with Omera, a protective mother on the planet Sorgan who is willing to take the Child into her own family. The Mandalorian does not fully commit to the role of fatherhood until the first-season finale, "Chapter 8: Redemption", when the Child himself is also adopted into the Mandalorian culture as a "foundling" and the Mandalorian is formally declared to be his father figure.

Anthony Breznican of Vanity Fair noted that none of the day-to-day difficulties of parenthood are portrayed in the series: "There is no shrill squawking from Baby Yoda, no tantrum, no spit-up, no uncontrollable shrieking that burrows into a parent's psyche like a dentist's drill shredding a soft, pink nerve." Likewise, Vulture writer Kathryn VanArendonk said the show ignores or does not address many parenting details that make fatherhood difficult, such as what the Child eats, when he goes him to sleep, and whether he wears diapers. She wrote: "The Mandalorian is uninterested in diapers, and so Mando gets to be a very particular image of fatherhood: the guy who doesn't have to sweat the small stuff." VanAnderonk described this as a wish fulfillment fantasy for parents or prospective parents: "a vision of parenting stripped so thoroughly of all detail and specificity that all that's left are archetypes: the parent, the child".

Gina Carano feels the Child brings a warmth to a series that acts as a counterbalance to the Mandalorian himself, who otherwise acts aloof and unemotional. Carano believes in this way, the Child "raises the emotional level and the stakes" of the series. Breznican echoed this sentiment: "There is an emotional transference happening here. The audience cares more about the unnamed, faceless Mandalorian because he cares so much about Baby Yoda." Despite his raw natural ability with the Force, the Child is untrained and still depends heavily on the assistance of the Mandalorian and other allies for protection. An interaction the Mandalorian has in "Chapter 5: The Gunslinger" with Peli Motto, a mechanic who briefly watches over the Child, is one of the most overt discussions about the challenges of parenthood. When the Mandalorian accidentally wakes the Child, who had been sleeping in Peli's arms, she chides him: "Do you have any idea how long it took me to get it to sleep?" She also condemns the Mandalorian for leaving the Child alone on the ship, saying: "You have an awful lot to learn about raising a young one".

ScreenCrush writer Matt Singer argued the Mandalorian's parenting errors make the show more appealing and relatable because making mistakes is a large part of being a parent. Some moments in the series have led fans to reevaluate the Child and question whether he may demonstrate evil tendencies, such as when he uses the Force to choke Cara Dune while she is engaged in a friendly arm wrestling match with the Mandalorian in "Chapter 7: The Reckoning". Caitlin Gallagher of Bustle suggested rather than building toward the Child becoming evil, the show could be suggesting the Mandalorian needs to find a way to raise the Child in a less violent environment. It will largely fall to the Mandalorian to provide this guidance, as when the Mandalorian stops him from strangling Cara.

== Cultural impact ==
=== Critical reception ===
The Mandalorian and Pedro Pascal's performance has garnered critical acclaim. Pascal said he has received positive direct feedback and responses from Star Wars fans, saying "this is the most invited into a family I have ever felt" about a role. CinemaBlend writer Sarah El-Mahmoud said the Mandalorian character was the most interesting aspect of the series for her, and that there was something "inherently brilliant" about him. She also praised the energy of Pascal's performance, saying he brings "the quiet lure and tension Clint Eastwood famously created in westerns like A Fistful of Dollars". Ethan Anderton of /Film said of the character: "The Mandalorian is truly a badass who blows Boba Fett out of the water." Entertainment Weekly writer James Hibberd called it bold to base a series upon a man in a mask, though he said Jon Favreau also accomplished this with the superhero protagonist of Iron Man (2008), which Favreau directed. Hibberd said with Pascal's vocal delivery and the show's impressive editing and camerawork, "Favreau manages to infuse the character with a surprising amount of personality". Many were glad to see Pedro Pascal as Djarin starring in The Book of Boba Fett. Polygon's Matt Patches praised the character saying, "Pedro Pascal's Din Djarin... steps back to the spotlight, and acts like the Boba Fett fans fell in love with in the first place."

Craig Elvy of Screen Rant wrote: "It's testament to The Mandalorian's creative team that a character who exposes so little in both literal and metaphorical terms can make such a strong connection with viewers." Kevin Pantoja of Screen Rant said the Mandalorian's origin character makes him empathetic, his action scenes are enjoyable, and the fatherhood role he accepts for the Child is his best characteristic. He described him as "the hero we root for from the start and there are plenty of reasons to have a connection to him". Men's Health writer Evan Romano said Pascal's "infectious charm" comes through in his performance, despite the helmet and the fact that many of his scenes are shared with a puppet. Sonia Saraiya of Vanity Fair called it a testament to Pascal's acting abilities that, despite his face seldom being seen, "his character's silent pledge to protect the Being has become enough to define his character". Polygon writer Charlie Hall praised the Mandalorian's stunt team, particularly their work during combat scenes in "Chapter 6: The Prisoner". The Mandalorian ranked third on a Screen Rant list of the most interesting characters from the first season of The Mandalorian, second on a separate list of the ten best characters from the show, and his costume was ranked second on a list of the ten best costumes in the first season.

Not all reviews of the character were positive. Vox writer Emily VanDerWerff called it an "objectively terrible idea" to cast an actor as talented and charismatic as Pascal and then "trap him behind a mask for its entire running time" with minimal dialogue. BBC writer Caryn James said she felt no emotional connection with the character, writing: "really anyone might be behind all that armour". Max Cea of GQ felt the mask was "emotionally concealing", making it difficult for the viewer to feel invested in the character. The A.V. Club writer Katie Rife said the fact that Pascal does not always portray the Mandalorian does not ruin her enjoyment of the show or character, but "knowing it's a stunt double does spoil the illusion a bit". Likewise, Philip Ellis of Men's Health called it "a disintegrating blow to our suspension of disbelief".

=== Merchandise ===
Several toys and merchandise works of the Mandalorian were released. A Funko Pop figurine of the character was announced on December 31, 2019. Hot Toys released a one-sixth-scale action figure of the Mandalorian, and Hasbro released a six-inch action figure of the character as part of the company's Star Wars: The Black Series toy line. Diamond Select Toys created a 1:2-scale bust of the Mandalorian, which stands at about 10 inches tall. Designed by Joe Allard and sculpted by Rocco Tartamella, it had a limited production run of 1,000 pieces. Lego has announced plans for an August 2020 release of BrickHeadz figures of the Mandalorian, as well as a September 2020 release of a Lego set for the Mandalorian's Razor Crest spaceship, which will include a small figurine of the character.
