= Chapter 6: The Prisoner =

- The Mandalorian episode
- Promotional poster
- Episode no.: Season 1 Episode 6
- Directed by: Rick Famuyiwa
- Story by: Christopher Yost
- Teleplay by: Rick Famuyiwa; Christopher Yost
- Cinematography by: Barry "Baz" Idoine
- Editing by: Jeff Seibenick
- Original release date: December 13, 2019
- Running time: 41 minutes

Co-starring
- Mark Boone Jr. as Ranzar "Ran" Malk; Bill Burr as Mayfeld; Natalia Tena as Xi'an; Clancy Brown as Burg; Richard Ayoade as the voice of Q9-0; Carl Weathers as Greef Karga; Ismael Cruz Cordova as Qin

Episode chronology
← Previous "Chapter 5: The Gunslinger"	Next → "Chapter 7: The Reckoning"
- The Mandalorian season 1

"Chapter 6: The Prisoner" is the sixth episode of the first season of the American streaming television series The Mandalorian. It was written by Rick Famuyiwa and Christopher Yost, with Famuyiwa also directing it. The episode takes place in the Star Wars universe five years after the events of Return of the Jedi (1983). In the episode, the Mandalorian accepts a five-man job from his former partner Ran Malk to free a prisoner from the New Republic, but he is betrayed by his teammates during the mission and has to find a way to escape before the prison ship jumps into hyperspace.

It stars Pedro Pascal as the Mandalorian, while the Child is created through animatronics and puppetry augmented with visual effects. The episode also features co-stars Bill Burr, Natalia Tena, Clancy Brown, Richard Ayoade, Carl Weathers, and Ismael Cruz Cordova. Jon Favreau was hired to be the showrunner of the series in March 2018, while Famuyiwa joined the series to direct two episodes for the season in October. Favreau also serves as the executive producer of the series alongside Dave Filoni, Kathleen Kennedy and Colin Wilson.

"Chapter 6: The Prisoner" was released on the streaming service Disney+ on December 13, 2019. The episode received generally positive reviews, with praise towards the performances (particularly Burr's) and the action sequences. It received a Primetime Emmy Award nomination.

== Plot ==
The Mandalorian contacts his old friend Ran, who adds him to a hired crew consisting of ex-Imperial sharpshooter Migs Mayfeld, Devaronian strongman Burg, assassin droid and pilot Q9-0, and knife-wielding Twi'lek Xi'an. Ran tasks them with hijacking a prison transport carrying Xi'an's brother Qin, who has been convicted of serious crimes against the New Republic. The crew easily fights their way through the ship's security droids, but the captain manages to activate an emergency beacon. The Mandalorian is unable to stop Xi'an from killing him and is then double-crossed and locked in Qin's cell while the crew makes their escape.

The Mandalorian escapes by using a security droid's arm to unlock the cell door. He seemingly hunts down and kills Mayfeld, Xi'an, and Burg, before confronting Qin. Qin persuades the Mandalorian to spare him, and they return to his ship, where Q9-0 is shot and destroyed while attempting to capture the Child after intercepting a message from the hunters' guild about its importance. Ran honors the contract and pays the Mandalorian for delivering Qin safely, but then orders a fighter pilot to pursue him as his ship departs. Qin then realizes that the captain's beacon had been slipped into his pocket, leading a trio of X-wing fighters to their location where they destroy the fighter and lay waste to Ran's spaceport. Lastly, Mayfeld, Burg, and Xi'an are shown to still be alive, as the Mandalorian had simply locked them inside the ship for the New Republic authorities to find.

== Production ==
=== Development ===
Lucasfilm and Disney announced the development of a new live action Star Wars series that would be released for their streaming service Disney+ in November 2017. The series would be focused in the Mandalorians exploring the "scum and villainy" of the Star Wars universe taking place five years after the events of the film Return of the Jedi (1983). The series would later reveal its official title The Mandalorian alongside the official premise. Lucasfilm president Kathleen Kennedy saw the opportunity of the series to allow a diverse group of writers and directors to create their own Star Wars stories. In March 2018, Jon Favreau was hired by Lucasfilm to be the head writer of the series, while Rick Famuyiwa was announced to direct two episodes for the series by October. The executive producers of the series include Kennedy, Favreau, Dave Filoni and Wilson. The first season's sixth episode titled "Chapter 6: The Prisoner", was scripted by Famuyiwa and Christopher Yost from a story written by the latter, and was released on Disney+ on December 13, 2019.

=== Writing ===
Yost developed the story to create an episode focused on a prison break. The story took inspiration from the television series Prison Break, as both the series and episode focuses on the characters elaborating a plan to get one of the prisoners out of it. The episode also took inspiration from the opening scene of the western film For a Few Dollars More (1965), as it features a sequence where a gang of bank robbers, broke their leader "El Indio" out of a high security jail, which would serve as inspiration for where the group manages to break Qin out from the prison. The Mandalorian also takes inspiration from Batman, for the part where he proceeds to capture his teammates, having been betrayed by them. The Mandalorian continues struggling with the responsibility of taking care of the Child, concealing him as he allows the stranger mercenaries on board his ship. However, as the series continues about the increasing relationship of the lead, Yost developed the story to continue the increase of the relationship of the characters and the Mandalorian redemption, as he is now willing to take dangerous jobs for money with the intention of providing for himself and the Child, which represents the struggling of a single father.

=== Casting ===
Footage shown at Star Wars Celebration in April 2019 revealed that Mark Boone Junior and Bill Burr were in the series, playing Ran Malk and Mayfeld, respectively. Bill Burr is not a fan of Star Wars, but he ran into Jon Favreau at a birthday party, and was offered a role in The Mandalorian. Other co-starring actors cast for this episode include Natalia Tena as Xi'an, Clancy Brown as Burg, Richard Ayoade as the voice of Q9-0 "Zero", and Ismael Cruz Córdova as Qin. Carl Weathers also co-stars as Greef Karga.

Additional guest-starring actors cast for this episode include Matt Lanter as Davan and directors Dave Filoni, Rick Famuyiwa, and Deborah Chow as X-wing pilots Trapper Wolf, Jib Dodger, and Sash Ketter. Lanter had previously voiced Anakin Skywalker in Star Wars: The Clone Wars and Star Wars Rebels. Brendan Wayne and Lateef Crowder are credited as stunt doubles for The Mandalorian. Barry Lowin is credited as an additional double for The Mandalorian, while Chris Bartlett is credited as a performance artist for Q9-0. Chad Bennett, Katherine O'Donovan, and Justin Anthony Williams are credited as stunt doubles for Migs Mayfeld, Xi'an, and Burg, respectively. "The Child" was performed by various puppeteers.

=== Music ===
A soundtrack album for the episode was released by digitally by Walt Disney Records on December 13, 2019, featuring Ludwig Göransson's score. On August 24, 2020, it was announced that Mondo would be releasing a limited edition for the complete score of the first season on vinyl edition, consisting of 8-CD discs for each episode with each one set pressed with a 180 Gram vinyl disc housed in it own jacked that features artwork by Paul Mann, while the box set is adorned with Mando's mudhorn Signet. The pre-orders for the soundtrack started on June 26, and finally released on December 15.

The Mandalorian: Chapter 6 (Original Score)
No.	Title	Length
1.	"Welcome Back"	3:49
2.	"The Gang"	2:06
3.	"Greatest Warriors in the Galaxy"	1:29
4.	"Let's Just Do It"	1:22
5.	"Hyperspace"	2:50
6.	"Little Mousey"	2:54
7.	"Tracking Beacon"	2:58
8.	"My Saviour"	1:07
9.	"Mando on the Move"	1:13
10.	"Nice Family"	2:25
11.	"Mando's Back"	7:15
Total length:		29:28

== Reception ==
=== Critical response ===
"Chapter 6: The Prisoner" received positive reviews. On Rotten Tomatoes, the episode holds an approval rating of 84% with an average rating of 7.6/10, based on 31 reviews. The website's critics consensus reads, "The Prisoner opts for more world-of-the-week action, providing many fun moments but little forward momentum."

In a positive review, Alan Sepinwall, of the Rolling Stone, felt that "like most of the series to this point, 'The Prisoner' isn't so much deep as it is fun. And that continues to work well enough." Keith Phipps of New York Magazine gave the episode 4 out 5 and wrote: "Anyone who's felt like The Mandalorian hasn't featured enough dirtbags so far should have no complaints after this episode." Phipps compared the episode to the film Vera Cruz (1954). Joe Skrebels at IGN gave it 7.6 out of 10 and wrote: "It's simple, effective, and offers us a wildly different set-up to other, more introspective episodes of the show because, of course, every heist needs a crew." Katie Rife of The A.V. Club enjoyed the episode but was frustrated by the lack of answers, saying "Personally, I don't mind the X-Files-esque way The Mandalorian's first season has toggled between standalone episodes and a larger story arc so much, as long as the side adventures are exciting and full of cool aliens and planets." Walter Chow from Decider, praised Famuyiwa's direction of the episode who stated that the episode points "to a direction this show could take in the hands of a gifted filmmaker more interested in story and pace than servicing the vocal minority", and considered it an improvement over the last four episodes. Joe Skrebels rated the episode with a score of 7.6 of 10 for IGN, criticizing the supporting cast but commented that the episode is "another one-time experiment that makes viewrs appreciate that we're getting something as willing to mess around", stating that better not piss off The Mandalorian.

In a negative review, Tyler Hersko, of IndieWire, stated that "the last three episodes of The Mandalorian have been entirely interchangeable, and there's been zero plot developments to speak of since the titular protagonist escaped the Bounty Hunter's Guild with Baby Yoda in tow in Episode 3." Dave Gonzales while reviewing for Thrillist, considered that the episode relied on easter eggs and considered that the series for the last two episodes "have been very slight, hewing close to the concept that any Star Wars content executed well enough to not be", and compared it to the prequel trilogy. Megan Crouse from Den of Geek, gave the episode 3 of 5 stars, considered the story for the episode to be bland but praised the action sequences and musical score.

=== Accolades ===
Award	Date of ceremony	Category	Recipient(s)	Result	Ref(s)
Visual Effects Society Awards	January 7, 2020	Outstanding Virtual Cinematography in a CG Project	Richard Bluff, Jason Porter, Landis Fields IV and Baz Idione	Nominated	
Primetime Creative Arts Emmy Awards	September 14–17 & 19, 2020	Outstanding Prosthetic Makeup for a Series, Limited Series, Movie or Special	Brian Sipe, Alexei Dmitriew, Carlton Coleman, Samantha Ward, Scott Stoddard, Mike Ornelaz, and Sabrina Castro	Nominated	
