= Walk Your Way Out =

- Directed by: Jay Karas
- Written by: Bill Burr
- Produced by: Dave Becky, Mike Berkowitz, Bill Burr
- Starring: Bill Burr
- Distributed by: Netflix
- Release date: January 10, 2017 (Netflix)
- Running time: 77 minutes
- Country: United States
- Language: English

Walk Your Way Out is a 2017 stand-up comedy film written by and starring the American comedian Bill Burr.

== Release ==
The film was released January 31, 2017 exclusively on Netflix.
