= Old Dads =

2023 film by Bill Burr

- Release poster
- Directed by: Bill Burr
- Written by: Bill Burr; Ben Tishler
- Produced by: Monica Levinson; Ben Tishler; Bill Block; Bill Burr; Mike Bertolina
- Starring: Bill Burr; Bobby Cannavale; Bokeem Woodbine
- Cinematography: Sean McElwee
- Edited by: Patrick J. Don Vito; Adriaan van Zyl
- Music by: Christopher Willis
- Production companies: Miramax; All Things Comedy; All of Us Productions; 3 Arts Entertainment
- Distributed by: Netflix
- Release date: October 20, 2023
- Running time: 104 minutes
- Country: United States
- Language: English

Old Dads is a 2023 American comedy film directed by Bill Burr in his directorial debut, and he produced and co-wrote with Ben Tishler. It stars Burr, Bobby Cannavale, and Bokeem Woodbine.

After selling their business, three fathers find themselves out of step with the ever-changing world.

The film was released by Netflix on October 20, 2023.

== Plot ==
Jack Kelly, Connor Brody, and Mike Richards have been friends and colleagues for decades. Now in their late 40s, they struggle with the modern world and how they are expected to behave. For example, when Connor tries to get his son Colin to apologize for hitting people, his wife Cara reprimands him. Deciding to sell their business Trifecta to some millennials, while being kept on as employees, they are shocked when the hipster new boss Aspen fires everyone over 35 except them. Moving away from simply selling throwback team jerseys, the company is modernizing, becoming both gender- and carbon-neutral.

Jack gets publicly chewed out by the director of his son Nate's pre-school for being two minutes late and responds with the coarsest of vulgarities. His wife, Leah, forces him to apologize, as a recommendation will be needed from her for private kindergarten admission, and she points out he has anger management issues. When Jack and Leah go to the school to apologize to the director, she makes him do it to the group of parents and kids. A few pinpoint the specifics that upset them, he apologizes for each. However, Leah points out Jack must continue to be on his best behavior for the next three months so the director gives Nate a recommendation.

Meanwhile, Mike, a divorced father of two adult sons, arrives home to a surprise. Although he has had a vasectomy, his young girlfriend Britney informs him that she is pregnant. Later, the three friends meet at the bar and Jack and Connor try to get him to look on the bright side.

As Jack has been asked to organize the school fundraiser, he and Connor are made to feel marginalized by the millennials. Then, the three friends are sent to find Ed Cameron, a man who has chosen to be off-grid since the 1980s, to convince him to represent the company. Travis, one of the young employees, accompanies them. As the old friends banter, he calls them misogynistic. Mike calls him out for his superior attitude, proving through his love of modern music that he is not always politically correct either. When they hit an armadillo, Ed comes to collect it.

Meanwhile, Leah comes across Cara. Colin walks up and hits her pregnant stomach. When she warns him, he blatantly punches it. Cara defends him and the women argue. At Trifecta, although the trio were successful recruiting Cameron, Aspen fires them as a hidden camera in the rental car caught their misogynistic banter. Even Travis is sacked, as his TV camera captured him singing strongly worded rap lyrics.

Afterwards, Mike cuts ties with Jack; Connor is not allowed to have contact because of Cara's anger at the Kellys, so Jack focuses on the school fundraiser. Everything goes well until he has another blow up, resulting in Leah kicking him out. Jack encounters Mike in a late-night eatery. They make peace, then pick up Connor for a casino bachelor party road-trip, as Britney insists they marry. They come across Aspen, who has been fired for accidentally using politically incorrect jargon and dumped. Later, at a strip club, Jack gets a call that Leah is in labor. Drunk, they are forced to get an Uber. Excruciatingly slow, they end up grabbing small electric scooters to complete the journey.

Missing the birth, Jack still makes up with Leah and vows to go to therapy. In the end, they opt for public school for Nate and Jack has learned to control his temper. Mike proposes to Britney properly and Connor gets Cara to lighten up.

== Cast ==
- Bill Burr as Jack Kelly
- Bobby Cannavale as Connor Brody
- Bokeem Woodbine as Mike Richards
- Katie Aselton as Leah Kelly
- Reign Edwards as Britney
- Jackie Tohn as Cara Brody
- Miles Robbins as Aspen Bell
- Rachael Harris as Dr. Lois Schmieckel-Turner
- Dash McCloud as Nate Kelly
- Justin Miles as Travis Romine
- C. Thomas Howell as Ed Cameron
- Bruce Dern as Richie Jacobs
- Dominic Grey Gonzalez as Colin Brody
- Natasha Leggero as Kelly
- Katrina Bowden as Joanna
- Angela Gulner as Mimi
- Josh Brener as Dana
- Erin Wu as Diamelle
- Carl Tart as Brian Dodson
- Rick Glassman as Hunter Lewis
- Abbie Cobb as Judy
- Tom Allen as Scooter
- Rory Scovel as Terrance Huffy-Schwinn
- Steph Tolev as Steph
- Paul Walter Hauser as Tracy

== Production ==
The spec script for Old Dads was noted in 2020. In March 2022, it was announced that Bill Burr was co-writing, directing and starring in a project called Old Dads for Miramax and Burr's own production company All Things Comedy. Announced as appearing alongside Burr were Bobby Cannavale and Bokeem Woodbine.

The script was co-written by Ben Tishler, who is also producing alongside Burr, Bill Block, Monica Levinson, and Mike Bertolina. In March 2022, it was reported that Katie Aselton was playing Burr's wife Leah. That same month, Reign Edwards was added to the cast as Britney, Woodbine's girlfriend.

Principal photography commenced in Los Angeles on 2 March 2022 and disclosed as joining the cast were Jackie Tohn, Miles Robbins, Rachael Harris, Dash McCloud, Justin Miles, Natasha Leggero, Katrina Bowden, Josh Brener, and Rory Scovel. The feature was described as a "semi-autobiographical" by The Hollywood Reporter, who interviewed Burr from his on-set trailer in April 2022, and that the screenplay was inspired by Burr and Tishler both experiencing fatherhood relatively late in life. Bertolina was quoted as calling it "Bill's stand-up in a narrative form".

== Release ==
Old Dads was released by Netflix on October 20, 2023.

=== Critical response ===
On the review aggregator website Rotten Tomatoes, 27% of 44 critics' reviews are positive, with an average rating of 4.6/10. The website's consensus reads: "With Old Dads, Bill Burr shows signs of promise as a filmmaker -- but they're largely muffled by his fitfully funny screenplay's reliance on tired jokes about generational divides." Metacritic, which uses a weighted average, assigned the film a score of 42 out of 100, based on 14 critics, indicating "mixed or average" reviews.
