= I'm Sorry You Feel That Way =

- Directed by: Jay Karas
- Written by: Bill Burr
- Produced by: Brian Volk-Weiss, Mike Berkowitz
- Starring: Bill Burr
- Edited by: Brenda Carlson
- Production company: New Wave Entertainment
- Distributed by: Netflix
- Release date: December 5, 2014 (Netflix)
- Running time: 80 minutes
- Country: United States
- Language: English

I'm Sorry You Feel That Way is a 2014 stand-up comedy film written by and starring the American comedian Bill Burr. It was filmed in the summer of 2014 at the Tabernacle Theater in Atlanta, Georgia. The film was shot in black and white, which is rare for modern comedy specials.

== Synopsis ==
Bill Burr discusses topics such as religion, sex, the downside of childhood hugs, the wisdom of Lutherans who believe there is no afterlife, the foolishness of watching the NFL draft on television and the absurdity of being kicked out of bed by your wife.

== Release ==
The film was released December 5, 2014 exclusively on Netflix.

== Reception ==
Reviewing the stripped-down production, Maren McGlashan of Paste Magazine stated, "The focus is on the material, plain and simple." McGlashan wrote, "Burr’s onstage persona is sharp, unwavering and nearly arrogant. This attitude defines him as a comic, and is even evident in the special’s title. Make no mistake, Burr’s concern for your feelings is anything but authentic."

Tripp Stelnicki of Vox Magazine noted Burr kept the same energy of his previous routines, with a more grown-up theme. "Burr has mentioned his fear of becoming the creepy old single dude who rants to strangers at the bar in previous specials. He seems to have reckoned with that and settled down some, and fortunately his material maintains its zealous vibe while reflecting a somewhat more-adult Bill Burr."
