= You People Are All the Same =

- Written by: Bill Burr
- Directed by: Jay Karas
- Starring: Bill Burr
- Country of origin: United States
- Original language: English

Production
- Running time: 69 minutes

Original release
- Network: Netflix
- Release: August 16, 2012

You People Are All the Same is a 2012 stand-up comedy film directed by Jay Karas and written by and starring the American comedian Bill Burr. It is his first stand-up comedy special exclusively for Netflix, and Netflix's first venture into comedy specials, not becoming a trend until at least a year later. In You People Are All the Same, filmed at Washington, D.C.'s Lincoln Theater, Bill Burr talks about race, gun politics, the politics of domestic relationships and more.

== Release ==
It was released on August 16, 2012 on Netflix.
