= Leyendas Legendarias =

Mexican podcast about strange history

- Genre: History
- Language: Spanish

Cast and voices
- Hosted by: José Antonio Badía; Eduardo Espinosa; Mario López Capistrán

Production
- Production: Jorge Szewc
- Length: 60 minutes

Publication
- No. of episodes: 389
- Original release: March 6, 2019
- Provider: Sonoro & Producciones Sin Contexto

Related
- Website: leyendaslegendarias.com

Leyendas Legendarias (English: Legendary Legends) is a Spanish-language podcast created by José Antonio Badía and Eduardo Espinosa and produced by Sonoro & Producciones Sin Contexto.

== Background ==
The show is a comedy podcast about strange history, which includes crime stories and paranormal events. The podcast is hosted by Eduardo Espinosa, Mario López Capistrán and José Antonio Badía in Ciudad Juárez, Chihuahua. Each episode is about one hour long. The show is produced by Sonoro & Producciones Sin Contexto

== Reception ==
The Capital Times called Leyendas Legendarias "one of Mexico's top podcasts" and the LA Times called it "the #1 Spanish-language podcast in the world."

=== Awards ===
Awards	Year	Category	Result	Ref.
iHeartRadio Podcast Awards	2022	Best Spanish Language Podcast	Nominated	
iHeartRadio Podcast Awards	2021	Best Spanish Language Podcast	Won	
MTV Millennial Awards	2021	Best Podcast	Nominated	
Spotify Awards	2020	Podcast of the year	Nominated	
