= Paper Tiger (2019 film) =

Stand-up comedy special by Bill Burr

- Promotional poster
- Directed by: Mike Binder
- Written by: Bill Burr
- Produced by: Bill Burr; Mike Binder; Dave Becky; Mike Bertolina; Nicky Kentish Barnes
- Starring: Bill Burr
- Cinematography: Nathanial Hill
- Edited by: Bijan Shams
- Distributed by: Netflix
- Release date: September 10, 2019 (Netflix)
- Running time: 67 minutes
- Country: United States
- Language: English

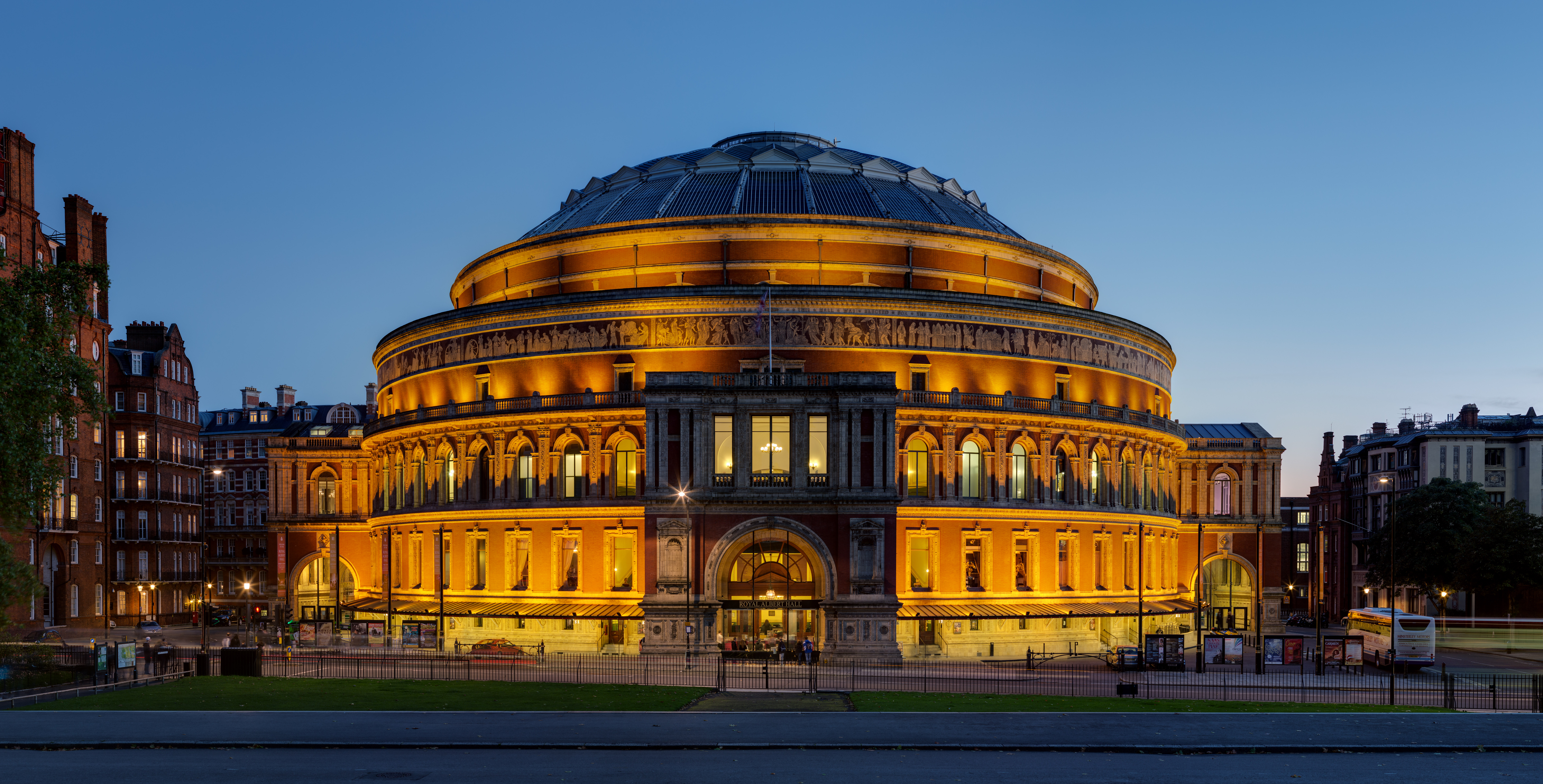
Royal Albert Hall in London, the venue of Paper Tiger

Paper Tiger is a 2019 stand-up comedy special by American comedian Bill Burr. Released via Netflix on September 10, 2019, it was filmed at the Royal Albert Hall in London and directed by filmmaker Mike Binder. Burr performed at the Royal Albert Hall for the first time on June 6, 2018, returning in 2019 to perform extra dates on March 4 and 5 for his show, which was then named 50. Paper Tiger was nominated at the 63rd Annual Grammy Awards for Best Comedy Album.

== Synopsis ==
The central subjects of Paper Tiger are cancel culture, the Me Too movement, people who spread misandry under the guise of feminism, Burr's anger issues and childhood, Elvis Presley's legacy of cultural appropriation, and Burr and his wife having to give up their beloved but "deranged" rescue pit bull when his wife became pregnant.

== Reception ==
On Rotten Tomatoes, the film holds an 86% rating from critics. Forbes compared Paper Tiger to Dave Chappelle's 2019 special Sticks & Stones, saying that both specials are framed as a backlash against outrage culture. The Washington Post cited Vulture describing the special as "thoughtful, surprising, introspective", noted the show's "risk of offensiveness" as being in a similar vein with Chappelle's release while pointing out the necessity to "defend the right to be offensive".

Paper Tiger was nominated at the 63rd Annual Grammy Awards for Best Comedy Album.
