= Monday Morning Podcast =

Comedy podcast

- Genre: Comedy
- Language: English

Cast and voices
- Hosted by: Bill Burr

Production
- Length: ~1 hour (Monday) ~30 minutes (Thursday)

Technical specifications
- Audio format: iTunes, SoundCloud, Google Podcasts, Spotify

Publication
- Original release: May 2007
- Provider: All Things Comedy
- Updates: Mondays and Thursdays

Monday Morning Podcast is a twice weekly comedy podcast hosted by American comedian, actor and celebrity podcaster Bill Burr. It was independently recorded from May 2007 until October 2012, when it became a part of the All Things Comedy podcast network, which was founded by Burr and Al Madrigal.

== Format ==
During each one-hour episode, Burr speaks without reservation and off-the-cuff about his past and recent experiences, current events, going on tour, sports, and offers advice to questions submitted by listeners. He is sometimes joined by his wife, Nia, and has many other featured guests and interviews with other comedians. The podcast is distributed through SoundCloud, iTunes, Google Podcasts, Spotify, and Castbox. As of April 2017, the podcast has over 100,000 followers on SoundCloud and each podcast usually receives between 40,000 and 70,000 plays from that source. Statistics are not listed for iTunes.

Beginning on March 12, 2015, Burr started releasing a second weekly edition, the Thursday Afternoon Monday Morning Podcast, which he often refers to as the Thursday Afternoon Just-Before-Friday Monday Morning Podcast. This podcast is formatted as a supplement to the regular weekly episode and features approximately half an hour of new material, followed by an hour of clips from old episodes.

== All Things Comedy ==
Bill Burr and Al Madrigal run the All Things Comedy podcast network. It has a show called Right Now with John Goblikon of the band Nekrogoblikon.
