= Bill Burr =

American comedian (born 1968)

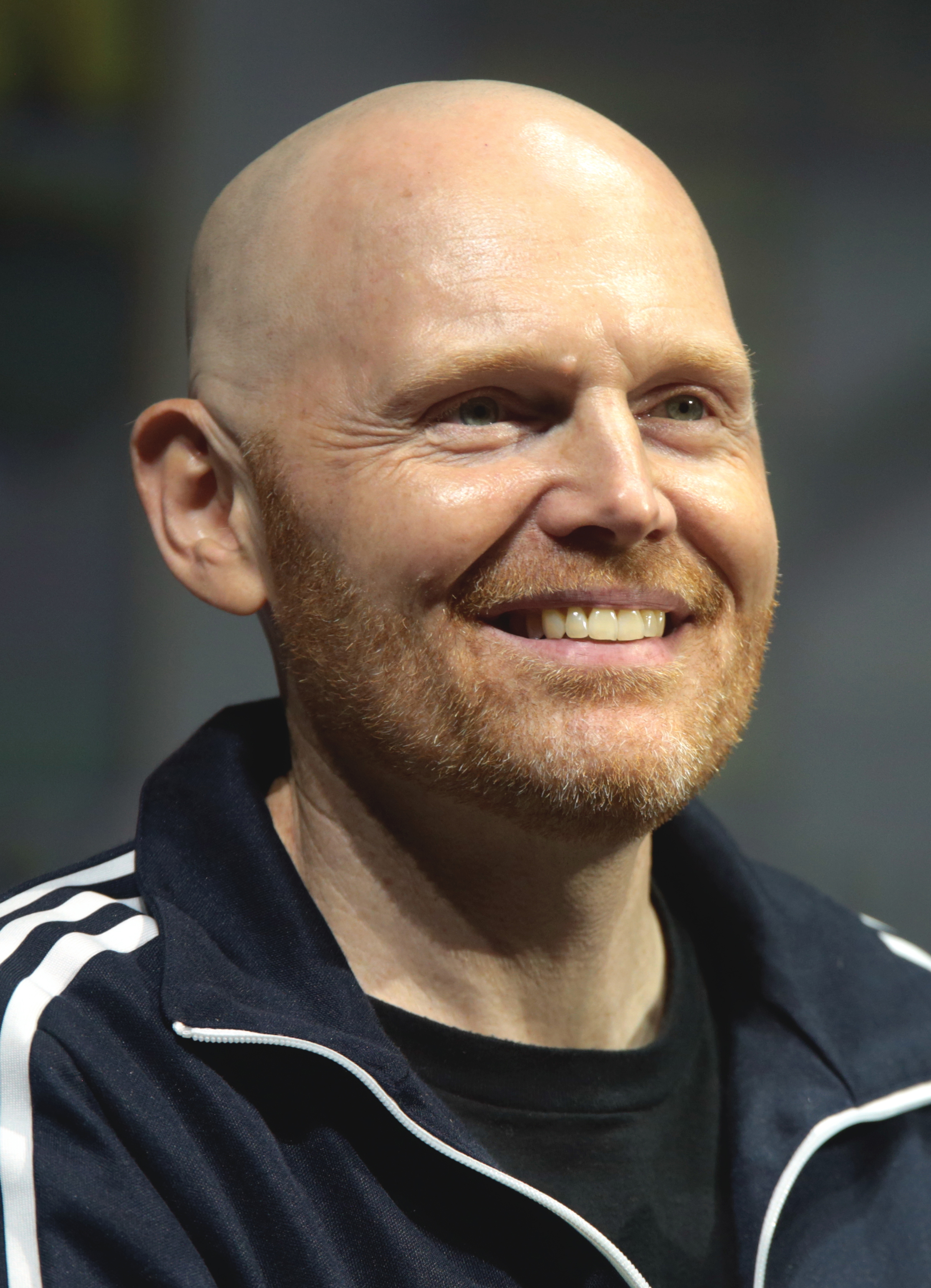
- Burr in 2018
- Born: William Frederic Burr; June 10, 1968 (age 58); Canton, Massachusetts, U.S.
- Education: Emerson College
- Occupations: Stand-up comedian; podcaster; actor; writer; director
- Spouse: Nia Hill (m. 2013)
- Children: 2

Comedy career
- Years active: 1992–present
- Medium: Stand-up; television; film; podcast
- Genres: Observational comedy; sketch comedy; black comedy; insult comedy; sarcasm; satire
- Website: billburr.com

William Frederic Burr (born June 10, 1968) is an American stand-up comedian, podcaster, actor, writer and director. As a comedian, he is known for sharp "rage-fueled" confrontational and observational comedy style often discussing subjects such as social issues, politics and the absurdities of the human condition. Burr has received nominations for two Emmy Awards and two Grammy Awards.

Burr created, co-wrote, and voiced the lead character in the Netflix animated sitcom F Is for Family (2015–2021). His other notable roles include various characters in Chappelle's Show (2004), Patrick Kuby in the AMC crime drama series Breaking Bad (2011–2013) and Migs Mayfeld in The Mandalorian (2019–2023). He made his feature-length directorial debut as the co-writer, director, and star of the comedy film Old Dads (2023) and has had supporting roles in Daddy's Home (2015), Daddy's Home 2 (2017), and The King of Staten Island (2020), Unfrosted (2024), and The Social Reckoning (2026). He made his Broadway debut in the 2025 revival of Glengarry Glen Ross.

Burr has released 14 stand-up comedy specials and albums including You People Are All the Same (2012), I'm Sorry You Feel That Way (2014) and Walk Your Way Out (2017). He received two Grammy Award for Best Comedy Album nominations for his Netflix special Paper Tiger (2019) and his Hulu comedy special Drop Dead Years (2025), the former of which also earned him a Emmy Award nomination.

== Early life and education ==
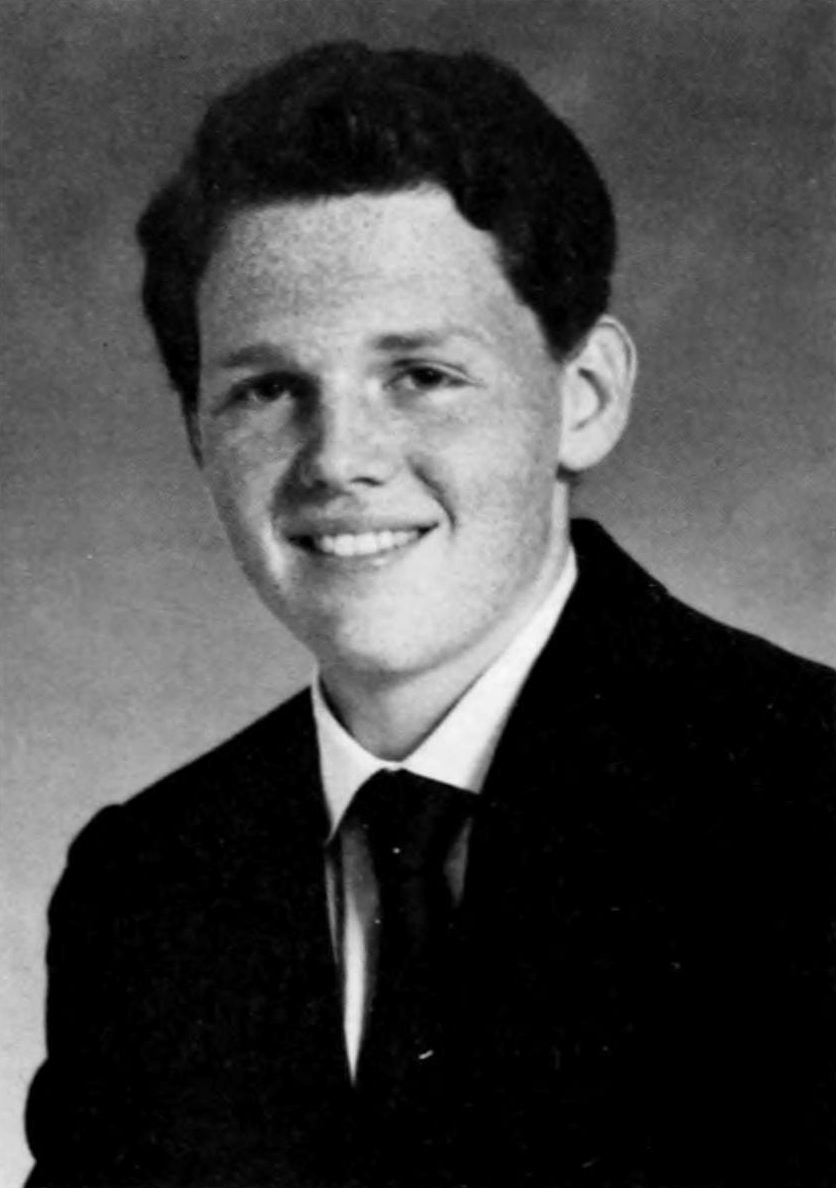
Burr pictured in the Canton High School yearbook, 1987

William Frederic Burr was born in Canton, Massachusetts, on June 10, 1968, the son of nurse Linda Ann and dentist Robert Burr. He is of German and Irish descent, and was raised Catholic. He graduated from Canton High School in 1987. After attending North Carolina State University for two semesters, he graduated from Emerson College in Boston in 1993 with a bachelor's degree in communications. He worked in warehouses before starting his comedy career, later stating that he enjoyed the freedom of the job: "If my boss gave me a rough time, I could just get on a forklift and just, like, drive away."

== Career ==
=== 1992–2009: Stand-up comedian and podcast ===
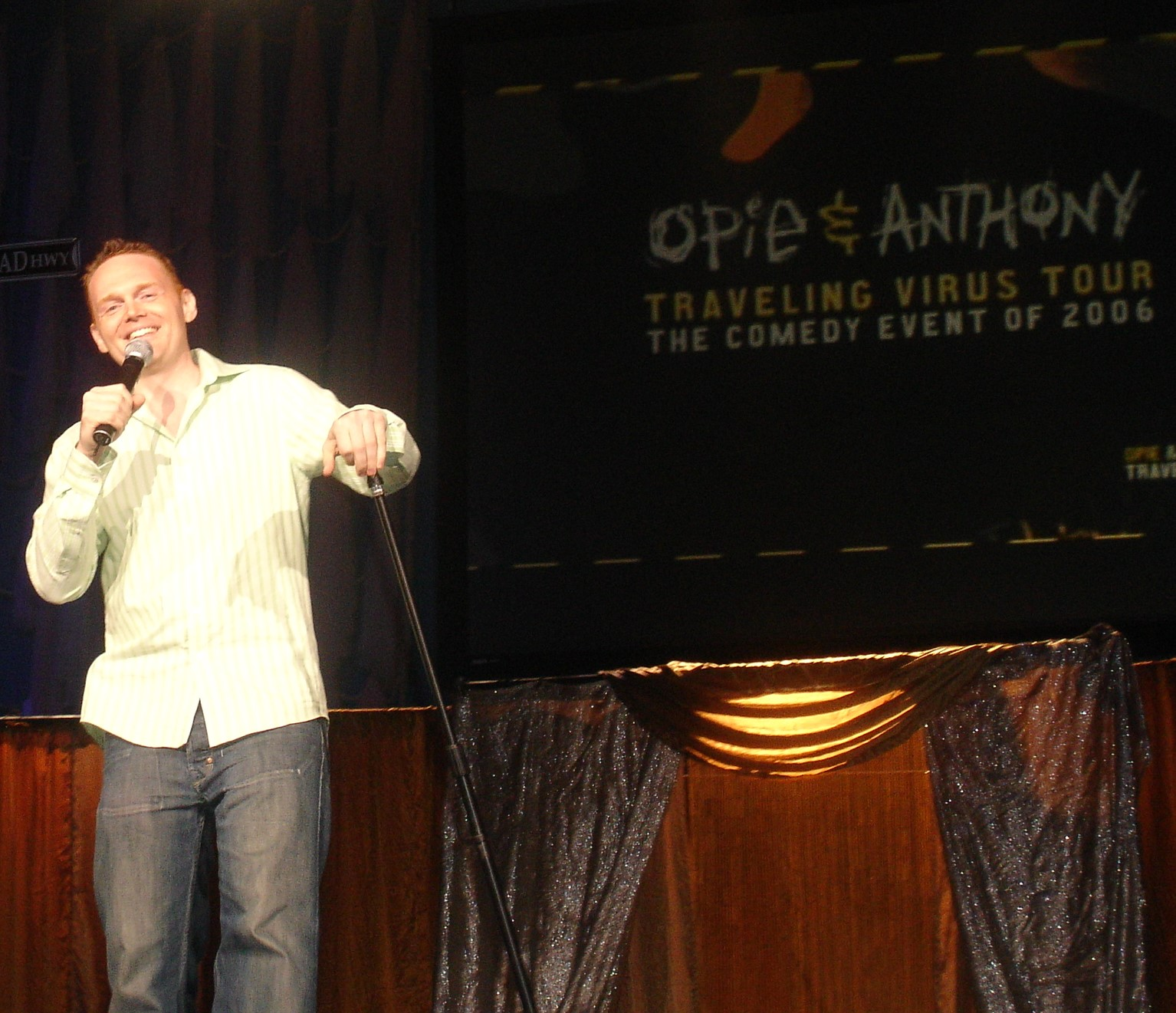
Burr performing in August 2006

Burr first performed stand-up comedy at the age of 23 on March 2, 1992. He moved to New York City in 1994. He started to appear in numerous shows performing standup such as Showtime at the Apollo in 2000, Comedy Central Presents in 2003, Just for Laughs in 2004, One Night Stand in 2005, and Live at Gotham in 2006. Also during this time, he co-starred in the TV series Townies in 1996, appeared in Two Guys and a Girl in 1998 and Law & Order: Criminal Intent in 2002. He gained prominence as a regular on Dave Chappelle's popular sketch comedy series Chappelle's Show in 2004 on Comedy Central.

On September 9, 2006, Burr performed at the Tweeter Center in Camden, New Jersey, across the Delaware River from Philadelphia, as part of Opie and Anthony's Traveling Virus Comedy Tour. After the crowd booed several comedians before him, Burr took the stage, also receiving boos. Forgoing the rest of his planned material, Burr unleashed a 12-minute expletive-laden rant in which he repeatedly attacked the crowd and the city of Philadelphia, especially its sports teams. "I was just annoyed because I was sitting there going like, this is one of the greatest comedy line-ups, as far as up-and-coming guys, that I've been around," Burr said. "And these fucking people are treating everyone like shit. And, you know, I'm a defensive, fucking angry dude anyways, so it was just the perfect storm." By the rant's end, Burr managed to win over the majority of the crowd and received a standing ovation. In 2017, Burr expressed some regret over the incident, saying, "I wasn't a professional. What I should have done was I should have kept my head in the game to survive it." The Huffington Post called the rant a "watershed moment in the history of comedy".

Since May 2007, Burr has recorded a weekly one-hour podcast, Bill Burr's Monday Morning Podcast, in which he speaks about his experiences, current events, going on tour, and sports, and offers advice to questions submitted by the listeners. The podcast is available on Burr's website, Spotify, YouTube, and on the All Things Comedy network he co-founded in 2012. He is sometimes joined by his wife Nia Hill and has featured guests and interviews with other comedians. In the 2008 video game Grand Theft Auto IV, Burr voiced Jason Michaels of the biker gang The Lost MC in the mission "No Love Lost". In 2009, he reprised his role in the game's expansion pack The Lost and Damned. Burr also appears as a guest on radio shows and other comedians' podcasts, such as Opie and Anthony, You Made It Weird with Pete Holmes, The Adam Carolla Show, The Joe Rogan Experience, WTF with Marc Maron, The Nerdist Podcast, The Adam Buxton Podcast, and Nobody Likes Onions. Burr was also the first guest on Tom Green's podcast. Burr's first hour-long special, Why Do I Do This? (2008), was filmed in New York.

=== 2010–2019: Acting roles and comedy specials ===
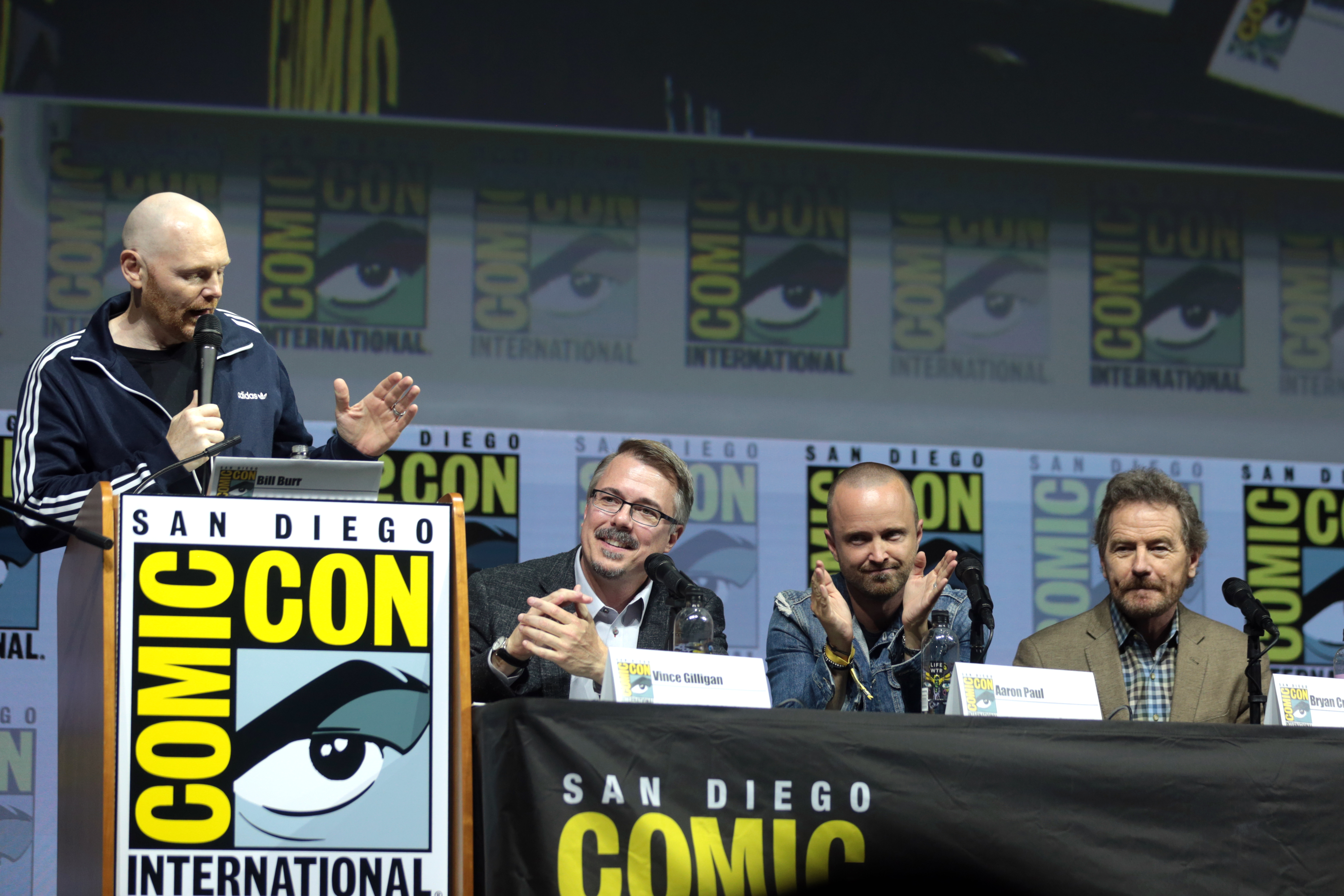
Burr (far left) with Breaking Bad's Vince Gilligan, Aaron Paul and Bryan Cranston at ComicCon in 2018.

Burr's special Let it Go was recorded at The Fillmore in San Francisco and premiered on Comedy Central on September 18, 2010. That same year Burr appeared in the comedy film Date Night as Detective Walsh. On April 18, 2011, he guest hosted the Hollywood Babble-On podcast alongside Ralph Garman. He also appeared in the fourth and fifth seasons of AMC's Breaking Bad as Patrick Kuby from 2011 to 2013. A later special, You People Are All the Same, premiered in 2012 as a Netflix exclusive. Burr's stand-up special You People Are All the Same (2012) was the first to premiere exclusively on Netflix. He played Mark Mullins in the 2013 buddy cop film The Heat. In 2014, Burr filmed his fourth hour-long special I'm Sorry You Feel That Way at the Tabernacle Theater in Atlanta, Georgia. Unusual for modern comedy specials, the film was shot in black and white.

All Things Comedy was officially launched on October 1, 2012, with a roster of 11 podcasts including Burr's own Monday Morning Podcast, The Long Shot Podcast by Eddie Pepitone, and Skeptic Tank by Ari Shaffir. By 2014, the network had six dozen members and over 50 podcasts. The network was started by comedians Al Madrigal and Bill Burr with The Daily Show on the All Things Comedy website. The network was established as an artist owned cooperative, which Madrigal and Burr emphasize as an important aspect of the collective. All Things Records was started in March 2014 and released three albums in the months following its creation including Believe in Yourself by Sam Tripoli, Live at the Comedy Castle by Brian Scolaro, and This Will Make an Excellent Horcrux by Jackie Kashian. Madrigal sees the network as a way of improving representation of Latin American people in media. For instance, the network hosts Spanish-language podcasts such as Leyendas Legendarias and El Dollop. All Things Comedy also partnered with Comedy Central to produce a documentary about Patrice O'Neal in addition to three comedy specials.

Burr voiced lead character Frank Murphy in F Is for Family, which premiered on Netflix on December 18, 2015. The show, an animated sitcom he created and co-wrote, drew on Burr's stand-up and the absurdity of political correctness. Season 4 of the series debuted on Netflix on June 12, 2020. Burr writes and executive produces the series along with Michael Price. Burr's fifth hour-long special, Bill Burr: Walk Your Way Out, debuted on Netflix on January 31, 2017. He appeared in the third episode (titled "Bill Burr") of the second season of the HBO series Crashing. Burr's sixth hour-long special, Paper Tiger, debuted on Netflix on September 10, 2019. He premiered a new podcast co-hosted with fellow comedian Bert Kreischer, called the Bill Bert Podcast, in October. In December, he played Migs Mayfeld in two episodes of the Disney+ series The Mandalorian.

=== 2020–present: Career expansion and Broadway debut ===
In 2020, he appeared in Judd Apatow's comedy film The King of Staten Island, and promoted the film on October 10 by hosting NBC's Saturday Night Live for the first time with musical guest Jack White. In March 2022, it was announced that Burr would co-write, direct, and star in the comedy film Old Dads, his feature-length directorial debut; it was released on Netflix in 2023 to mixed reviews. A few months later, he received a Primetime Emmy Award for Outstanding Actor in a Short Form Comedy or Drama Series nomination for the dark comedy series Immoral Compass (2021–present). His seventh stand-up special, Live at Red Rocks, was released on July 12.

On August 21, 2022, Burr became the first comedian to perform at Fenway Park, in front of a sold-out crowd of around 35,000 people (and replied to fans that he did not count them himself to confirm). It was also the largest comedy show in the history of Boston. He has had sold-out shows at Madison Square Garden on November 14, 2015, and then again on November 11, 2023, the Royal Albert Hall on June 6, 2018, and consecutive shows on March 4 and 5, 2019. He holds the record for the most consecutive sold-out shows at Boston's Wilbur Theatre, where he performed 19 sold-out shows in a row, almost doubling the record of 10 set by Aziz Ansari. Burr sold out 20,000 seats at the Los Angeles Forum on September 28, 2018. In September 2021, he sold out Red Rocks Amphitheatre. In 2023, he performed at the 5,000-seat ancient Roman amphitheater, the Odeon of Herodes Atticus in Athens, Greece. In 2024, Bill performed in front of a sold-out crowd of more than 60,000 at Gillette Stadium where he followed Jay-Z for the Tom Brady 's Patriots Hall of Fame ceremony.

In 2023, Burr had a cameo role as the voice of pastor Nick Saint Angelo in the episode "the wizard" of HBO series Barry. In 2024 he was cast in a supporting cameo role as John F. Kennedy in the Jerry Seinfeld directed satirical comedy Unfrosted which debuted on Netflix. Chris Evangelista of SlashFilm wrote that among the film's numerous cameos, Burr's performance was "particularly memorable". In 2024 he returned for the second time to host Saturday Night Live with musical guest Mk.gee. Burr hosted the first episode since the 2024 United States presidential election results with Jesse Hassenberger of The A.V. Club writing, "Burr seemed to have been booked as the Dave Chappelle Emeritus, a blunt-spoken comic willing to speak some possibly-uncomfortable truths, regardless of election results". In 2025, he released his eighth comedy special, Drop Dead Years on Hulu. Sean McCarthy of Decider wrote, "Burr may continue to rub some people the wrong way, but that's always been a part of his comedic ethos, and if you can listen to what he's actually saying, there's a lot not only worth considering, but also worth laughing about."

It was announced that Burr would make his Broadway debut in the 2025 revival of the David Mamet play Glengarry Glen Ross acting opposite Kieran Culkin and Bob Odenkirk. Burr was recommended to director Patrick Marber for the production by Nathan Lane, who was originally approached for the role but had to drop out due to scheduling conflicts. Lane stated, the revival had to have an "all star cast and the first person you should cast is Bill Burr," adding: "he's the leading comedian in America, a wonderful actor and sounds like a David Mamet-character". Burr received positive reviews for his Broadway debut with David Rooney of The Hollywood Reporter describing his performance as "a knockout", adding: "It’s no surprise that the seasoned comic has flawless timing." Mark Kennedy of The Associated Press declared that he "almost steals the show" citing his casting as "perfect", while adding that Burr "turns out to be the most comfortable with Mamet’s tricky dialogue." Upon not receiving a nomination for the Tony Award for Best Featured Actor in a Play, Helen Shaw of Vulture stated, "How did Burr not get nominated? He's actually giving a performance where this show makes sense again", adding: "The sound of the play, the energy of the play makes sense in him and he moved the play from being an antique piece into something that feels present".

Burr and his North Hill Productions will bring original scripted and unscripted comedic content to Fox.

In September 2025, Burr joined the cast of The Social Reckoning, Aaron Sorkin’s sequel to The Social Network (2010).

Burr received criticism in September 2025 for accepting a gig at the Riyadh Comedy Festival, hosted by the Saudi government in Saudi Arabia. Human Rights Watch condemned the Festival as a "deliberate effort to whitewash the country's human rights record". Burr defended his appearance in the Festival, calling it a "mind-blowing experience" and stated that "it felt right afterwards." He stated that the Saudis were "just like" Americans, though he did state that jokes about the Saudi royals and religion were banned. Noting Burr's previous criticism of billionaires, Ben Schwartz of The Nation asked, "How can Burr ever get mad about billionaires here after insisting that the Saudi royal family over there is 'just like us'?". He also mentioned that Burr had previously criticized singer Beyoncé for performing for Libyan leader Muammar Gaddafi.

== Style and influences ==
Burr has been referred to as a "comedian's comedian" by observers of the American stand-up comedy circuit. Rolling Stone magazine called him "the undisputed heavyweight champ of rage-fueled humor". Burr often portrays himself as "that loud guy in the bar" with "uninformed logic". In an interview with The Boston Globe, he stated, "I'm the 'dude, bro' guy." According to the Montreal Gazette, he is "a cynic and a contrarian who has never paid any heed to political correctness". The New York Times in 2013 called him "one of the funniest, most distinctive voices in the country for years". In 2022, The Hollywood Reporter described the variety and effectiveness of Burr's comedy and referred to his "mastery of the medium".

In 2013, Burr listed Richard Pryor, George Carlin, Bill Cosby, Sam Kinison, and Patrice O'Neal as the five greatest stand-up comedians of all time.

== Personal life ==
Burr is married to Nia Renee Hill, who sometimes appears as a guest on his podcast. They reside in Los Angeles and have two children: a daughter born in 2017 and a son born in 2020. Burr is a drummer and licensed helicopter pilot. He has named John Bonham, Dave Lombardo, and Nicko McBrain as his favorite drummers. He is a fan of rock and heavy metal bands such as AC/DC, Gojira, Karnivool, Iron Maiden, Meshuggah, Metallica, Ministry, Pantera, Slayer, Tool, The Mars Volta, and Led Zeppelin. He enjoys smoking cigars. He quit drinking alcohol in 2018. Additionally he is a fan of New England based sports teams such as the Boston Red Sox and New England Patriots.

Burr's political statements have often garnered widespread attention. He has made various statements in support of gun control, and, seemingly, of abortion rights, although he stated in his 2022 stand-up special, Live at Red Rocks, that he has a "weird take" on the latter: "Pro-choice always made sense to me because I don't like people telling me what to do. And I always was just like, 'It's your body. Who the fuck am I to tell you what to do with your body?' [...] However, I still think you're killing a baby. That's where it gets weird."

Burr has said that he believes political correctness fails to effectively address the problems it aims to fix, such as racism, because it only focuses on the words people use rather than changing their attitudes. He has also said that political correctness has no answer for, or impact on, other major sociopolitical issues such as the power held by bankers and pharmaceutical executives.

Burr voted for Green Party candidate Ralph Nader in the 2000 presidential election. He did not vote for either Hillary Clinton or Donald Trump in the 2016 presidential election as he had a negative opinion of both. In 2021, he criticized Florida's Republican governor Ron DeSantis for removing mask requirements in the state during the COVID-19 pandemic.

In a controversial January 2025 podcast by Howie Mandel, Burr publicly addressed speculation from musician Billy Corgan that they are half-brothers. Burr criticized Mandel for surprising him with the arrival of Corgan, who said he had been told Burr had been informed. Burr alleged Mandel was "rude" and chasing "ratings," and said a podcast wasn't the appropriate venue for them to meet. Mandel left the room; amid jokes, Burr said he and Corgan "have the same father" and also said of his father: "The fact that he said he can't sing, I think that sort of disproves that we're related."

== Works and performances ==
=== Film ===
Year	Title	Role	Notes	Refs.
2000	Perfect Fit	Doorman		
2002	Passionada	Blackjack Player		
2006	Thirteen or Bust	Himself		
2010	Date Night	Detective Walsh		
2011	Cheat	Billy	Short	
2011	Give It Up for Greg Giraldo	Himself	Documentary	
2012	Stand Up Guys	Larry		
2013	The Heat	Mark Mullins		
2014	Zombeavers	Joseph		
2014	Walk of Shame	Officer Walter		
2014	Black or White	Rick Reynolds		
2015	Daddy's Home	Jerry		
2017	Gilbert	Himself	Documentary	
2018	The Front Runner	Pete Murphy		
2020	The King of Staten Island	Ray Bishop		
2020	The Opening Act	Barry		
2021	The Guilty	Nightclub Caller	Voice	
2021	Back Home Again	Officer Quill	Voice; Short	
2022	Dog	Officer O'Shaughnessy		
2023	Old Dads	Jack Kelly	Also director and co-writer	
2023	Leo	Squirtle	Voice	
2024	Drugstore June	Dr. Weisman		
2024	Unfrosted	John F. Kennedy		
2026	The Social Reckoning	Charlie Garrigan		

=== Television ===
Year	Title	Role	Notes	Refs.
1996	Townies	Ryan Callahan	Main cast	
1998	Two Guys and a Girl	Fitzey	Episode: "Two Guys, a Girl and a Party"	
2000	Showtime at the Apollo	Himself	Episode: "Episode #14.8"	
2002	Law & Order: Criminal Intent	Jogger	Episode: "Maledictus"	
2003	Comedy Central Presents	Himself	Episode: "Bill Burr"	
2003	I Love the '80s Strikes Back	Himself	Episode: "1980"	
2004	Chappelle's Show	Various Characters	Recurring cast (season 2)	
2004	Shorties Watchin' Shorties	Himself	Recurring cast	
2004	Just for Laughs	Himself	Episode: "Bill Burr"	
2005	One Night Stand	Himself	Episode: "Bill Burr"	
2005	Weekends at the D.L.	Himself	Episode #1.15	
2006	Jamie Foxx Presents Laffapalooza	Himself	Episode: "Laffapalooza Volume 7"	
2006	Live at Gotham	Himself/Host	Episode #1.4	
2008	Down and Dirty with Jim Norton	Himself	Episode #1.3	
2010	Just for Laughs	Himself	Episode: "Cheech & Chong"	
2011	Dave's Old Porn	Himself	Episode: "Bill Burr/Nina Hartley"	
2011–2013	Breaking Bad	Patrick Kuby	Recurring cast (seasons 4–5)	
2012	Funny as Hell	Himself	Episode #2.3	
2013	Inside Joke at Moontower	Himself	2 episodes	
2013–2016	New Girl	Bobby	Guest cast (season 2 & 5)	
2014	Maron	Himself	Episode: "The Joke"	
2014	Comedians in Cars Getting Coffee	Himself	Episode: "Smoking Past the Band"	
2014	Wicked Bites	Himself	Episode: "Comics Come Home XX"	
2014–2015	Kroll Show	Detective Smart	Recurring cast (season 2–3)	
2015	The Jim Gaffigan Show	Himself	Episode: "My Friend the Priest"	
2015	The Art of...	Himself	Episode: "The Art of Comedy"	
2015–2021	F Is for Family	Frank Murphy (voice)	Main cast; also co-creator	
2016	The Simpsons	Boston Football Fan (voice)	Episode: "The Town"	
2018	Crashing	Himself	Episode: "Bill Burr"	
2018	Jay Leno's Garage	Himself	Episode: "Living the Dream"	
2019	The Chef Show	Himself	Episode: "Gwyneth Paltrow/Bill Burr"	
2019–2020	The Mandalorian	Migs Mayfeld	Guest cast (season 1–2)	
2020	Jay Leno's Garage	Himself	Episode: "Dare to be Different"	
2020	Saturday Night Live	Himself/Host	Episode: "Bill Burr/Jack White"	
2020	The Comedy Store	Himself	Main cast	
2020–2022	Puppy Dog Pals	Butch (voice)	Guest cast (season 3 & 5)	
2021	Reservation Dogs	Garrett Bobson	Episode: "California Dreamin'"	
2021	30 for 30	Himself	Episode: "Once Upon a Time in Queens, Part 3 & 4"	
2021	Immoral Compass	Rick	Main cast	
2022	George Carlin's American Dream	Himself	Episode: "Part 1"	
2023	Barry	Pastor Nick Saint Angelo (voice)	Episode: "the wizard"	
2024	Saturday Night Live	Himself/Host	Episode: "Bill Burr/Mk.gee"	
2025	Saturday Night Live 50th Anniversary Special	Himself	Television special	
2025	Mark Twain Prize for American Humor: Conan O'Brien	Himself	Television special	

=== Theater ===
Year	Title	Role	Playwright	Venue	Ref.
2025	Glengarry Glen Ross	Dave Moss	David Mamet	Palace Theatre, Broadway	

=== Comedy specials and albums ===
Year	Title	Studio	Formats	Ref.
2003	Emotionally Unavailable	Self-released	CD release	
2003	Comedy Central Presents	Comedy Central	TV	
2005	One Night Stand	HBO	TV	
2008	Why Do I Do This?	Image Entertainment	CD release / DVD	
2010	Let It Go	Image Entertainment	CD Release / DVD	
2012	You People Are All the Same	Netflix	Streaming / DVD	
2014	Live At Andrew's House	Third Man Records	Limited vinyl release	
2014	I'm Sorry You Feel That Way	Netflix	Streaming	
2017	Walk Your Way Out	Netflix	Streaming	
2019	Paper Tiger	Netflix	Streaming / Vinyl	
2021	Live From Madison Square Garden	All Things Comedy	Vinyl release	
2022	Friends Who Kill	Netflix	Streaming	
2022	Live at Red Rocks	Netflix	Streaming / Vinyl	
2025	Drop Dead Years	Hulu	Streaming	

=== Podcast ===
Year	Title	Role	Ref.
2007–present	Monday Morning Podcast	Himself (host)	
2019–2021	The Bill Bert Podcast	Himself (co-host)	
2021–present	Anything Better?	Himself (co-host)	

=== Video games ===
Year	Title	Role	Ref.
2008	Grand Theft Auto IV	Jason Michaels (voice)	
2009	Grand Theft Auto IV: The Lost and Damned	Jason Michaels (voice)	

== Awards and nominations ==
Award	Year	Work	Category	Result	Ref.
Astra Midseason Awards	2020	The King of Staten Island	Best Supporting Actor	Nominated	
Broadway.com Audience Awards	2025	Glengarry Glen Ross	Favorite Featured Actor in a Play	Nominated	
Grammy Awards	2021	Paper Tiger	Best Comedy Album	Nominated	
Grammy Awards	2026	Drop Dead Years	Best Comedy Album	Nominated	
Just for Laughs Comedy Festival	2014	—N/a	Stand-Up Comedian of the Year	Won	
Primetime Emmy Awards	2022	Immoral Compass	Outstanding Actor in a Short Form Comedy or Drama Series	Nominated	
Primetime Emmy Awards	2025	Drop Dead Years	Outstanding Variety Special (Pre-Recorded)	Nominated	
Webby Awards	2019	Bill Burr's Guide to Driving Etiquette	Best Web Personality/Host (Video)	Nominated	
