= Anthony Breznican =

American journalist and novelist

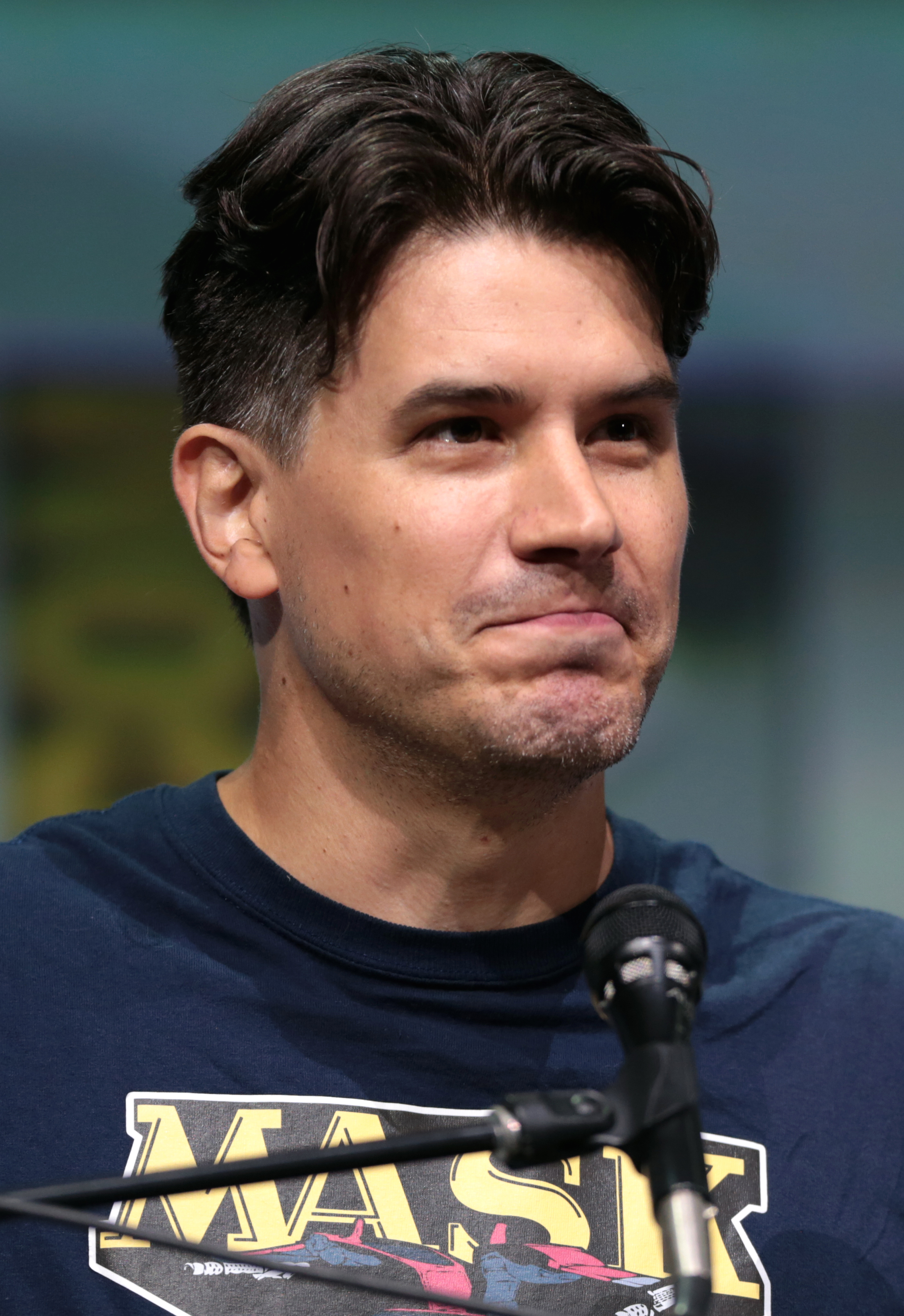
- Breznican at the 2017 San Diego Comic-Con
- Born: 1976 (age 49–50)
- Education: University of Pittsburgh
- Occupations: Journalist; novelist
- Children: 2

Anthony Breznican (born 1976) is an American journalist and novelist who currently writes for Vanity Fair. He is the author of the 2014 novel Brutal Youth, about first-year students dealing with bullying at their Catholic high school. Breznican has also written about personal memories of Philip Seymour Hoffman and Fred Rogers of Mister Rogers' Neighborhood. He lists his favorite movies as Avalon and Notting Hill.

== Career ==
Anthony Breznican is a film journalist and is currently the Senior Hollywood Correspondent for Vanity Fair. Previously, he spent eight years as a senior staff writer for Entertainment Weekly, six years at USA Today and seven years at the Associated Press. He specializes in covering tentpole franchises such as Star Wars, Marvel, and DC. Breznican also had his own SiriusXM show for six years, "Behind the Scenes with Anthony Breznican," Sirius XM 105, EW Radio, every Wednesday at 6 p.m. Eastern. His writings have also appeared in The New York Times, CNN, Essence Magazine, Playboy Magazine, Time Magazine, The Washington Post, and more.

Breznican had the Vanity Fair June 2022 cover story, Star Wars: The Rebellion Will Be Televised, shot by famed photographer, Annie Liebovitz.

He has written notably about personal remembrances of Philip Seymour Hoffman and Fred Rogers of Mister Rogers' Neighborhood, following the deaths of Hoffman and Rogers.

In June 2014 he published a novel, Brutal Youth, with the Thomas Dunne imprint of St. Martin's Press. Author Stephen King offered a quote for the book's cover saying, "If you thought high school was hell, has Anthony Breznican got a story for you..." Set in a small mill town in Pennsylvania, Brutal Youth tells the story of three freshman students at St. Mike's Catholic School - Peter Davidek, Noah Stein, and Lorelai Paskal. The trio are trying to survive their first year at the school, which is known for its extreme hazing and bullying from the upperclassmen. Brutal Youth, inspired by events from Breznican's own childhood, was praised by Kevin Nance in USA Today as being timely "in this era of heightened consciousness about bullying and its occasionally horrific consequences on high school and college campuses." Nance called it a "bluntly effective debut novel" and "crackling good entertainment." Reviewing the novel for Library Journal, Jan Blodgett said "Breznican captures a perfect balance of horror, heartbreak, and resilience" in his depiction of a Catholic high school fraught with hazing.

== Personal life ==
Breznican grew up in New Kensington, Pennsylvania and attended the University of Pittsburgh. He is married with two children and lives in Los Angeles.

== Works ==
- Brutal Youth (Thomas Dunne Books/St. Martin's Press, 2014)
- "The night Philip Seymour Hoffman changed my life ..." Entertainment Weekly, February 6, 2014
- "Remembering Mr. Rogers, a true-life 'helper' when the world still needs one" Entertainment Weekly, May 23, 2017
