= Fatherly =

American website with parenting advice

- Website type: Online media
- Available in: English
- Founded: April 2015
- Headquarters: 394 Broadway Fl 2, New York City, New York, {{{location_country}}}
- Country of origin: United States
- Area served: Worldwide
- Owner: Bustle Digital Group
- Founders: Michael Rothman; Simon Isaacs
- Key people: Michael Rothman (Co-founder and CEO); Simon Isaacs (Co-founder); Andrew Burmon (Editor-in-Chief); Michael Wertheim (Chief Operating Officer)
- Revenue: $5.2 million (2017)
- Website: fatherly.com
- Advertising: Yes
- Registration: No
- Launched: April 2015; 11 years ago
- Current status: Active
- Native client on: Web browser

Fatherly is a digital lifestyle brand that provides news, expert advice, product recommendations and other resources for parents. The company was founded in 2015 and is based in New York City.

== Overview ==
Fatherly offers articles, videos, and other digital content tailored to young fathers. The company has been described by The New York Times as "BuzzFeed meets Vice for parents". While the site's content is geared toward men, half of Fatherly's audience are women.

Fatherly covers a variety of topics across health, science, play, relationships, personal finance, gear and parenting. It also has several content franchises including 940 Weekends, which focuses on activities; My Father, The…, which provides first-person narratives from sons and daughters of famous parents; and The Fatherly Podcast, a streaming, conversation-based show.

== History ==
In October 2014, when Fatherly.com was still in beta, the company created a grant called The Fatherly Fund to help parents fund and complete projects for their children that they would not otherwise be able to afford.

Founded by Simon Isaacs and Michael Rothman, Fatherly launched in April 2015. The founders cited the lack of male-focused parenting content as inspiration for the company. Rothman further explained that he and Isaacs began Fatherly in part because "there are more diverse notions of family generally [and] there should be a platform for insights, advice and product recommendations that provides a bigger tent for more of today's parents."

Fatherly was named one of Oprah's "favorite things" of 2016 and was noted by Adweek, Digiday and CNBC for its success with video targeting on Facebook. In June 2016, nearly 3 million unique visitors went to the site. By 2017, Fatherly reached 75 million people on Facebook each week.

In early 2017, Fatherly received a Webby Award for "Best Parenting Site on the Internet." Later that same year, Fatherly hired Andrew Burmon as editor-in-chief of the site. Fatherly hired Michael Wertheim as the company's Chief Operating Officer.

In 2020, Fatherly was acquired by Some Spider Studios, the parent of Scary Mommy. In 2021, Bustle Digital Group acquired Some Spider.

== Funding ==
Fatherly raised an initial round of funding in 2015 for $2 million, which was led by SoftTech VC. Other investors in the round included Crosslink Capital, Lerer Hippeau Ventures, The Knight Foundation, Gary Vaynerchuk and several angel investors.

In 2017 Fatherly raised its Series A funding round totaling $4 million, which was led by BDMI with participation from SoftTech VC, Crosslink Capital, WPP plc, Lerer Hippeau Ventures and the talent agency UTA.
