= Chapter 12: The Siege =

- The Mandalorian episode
- Episode no.: Season 2 Episode 4
- Directed by: Carl Weathers
- Written by: Jon Favreau
- Cinematography by: Matthew Jensen
- Editing by: Jeff Seibenick
- Original release date: November 20, 2020
- Running time: 36 minutes

Co-starring
- Gina Carano as Cara Dune; Carl Weathers as Greef Karga; Horatio Sanz as Mythrol; Omid Abtahi as Dr. Pershing; Giancarlo Esposito as Moff Gideon

Episode chronology
← Previous "Chapter 11: The Heiress"	Next → "Chapter 13: The Jedi"
- The Mandalorian season 2

"Chapter 12: The Siege" is the fourth episode of the second season of the American streaming television series The Mandalorian. It was written by showrunner Jon Favreau and directed by Carl Weathers. It was released on Disney+ on November 20, 2020. In the episode, The Mandalorian returns to his friends Greef Karga and Cara Dune on Nevarro for repairs on his ship but is talked into a mission involving an old imperial base. The episode received positive reviews, in particular for the action sequences, Weathers' direction, and building sense of tension.

== Plot ==
The Mandalorian and the Child head to Nevarro after the Mon Calamari repairs to the ship proved inadequate. (Note: As seen in "Chapter 11: The Heiress".) They reunite with Greef Karga and Cara Dune there, who has since turned the planet around. Cara has become the local marshal, while Greef has taken on the role of magistrate, assisted by the unnamed Mythrol taken by the Mandalorian in Chapter 1. (Note: A bounty caught by The Mandalorian in "Chapter 1: The Mandalorian".) In return for the repairs, The Mandalorian agrees to help destroy an old Imperial base on the other side of the planet. The Child is placed in a school, where he uses The Force to steal blue macaron treats from another student.

The base turns out to have more than just a skeleton crew and stormtroopers patrol the corridors. They deactivate the lava cooling system so that the natural lava flows will destroy the base. During their escape, they find scientists and vats of what appear to be cloned bodies. The scientists attempt to destroy the evidence. Mythrol uncovers a recording from Dr. Pershing that reveals he had been transfusing the blood of the Child, which has a high 'M-count', into test subjects. Stormtroopers soon swarm the team and they are forced to escape before the lava overheats and destroys the base.

The Mandalorian flies from the base to retrieve his ship, using his jetpack, whilst Karga, Dune, and Mythrol steal a stormtrooper transport. A chase ensues between the transport, driven by Dune, and scout troopers riding speeder bikes. Greef Karga kills the last scout trooper, but TIE fighters launched from the base chase after them, disabling the transport's cannon. The base soon explodes due to the overheating of the lava. As the TIE fighters close in on Dune, Karga, and Mythrol, the Razor Crest appears and destroys the Imperials.

With his ship repaired and Nevarro secured, Mando heads for Corvus to track down Ahsoka Tano. The New Republic visits Karga to investigate the incident, with Captain Carson Teva noting "something is brewing and we need to put a stop to it". Teva speaks with Dune and tries asking for her help in fighting remnants of the Empire. When Alderaan, Dune's homeworld, is mentioned, she tells Teva that she lost everything after its destruction.

An Imperial officer receives confirmation from one of the mechanics working for Greef Karga that a tracking beacon has been placed on the Razor Crest. Moff Gideon is informed and declares that they will be ready. The episode ends with Gideon looking over a line of Dark Troopers awaiting activation.

== Production ==
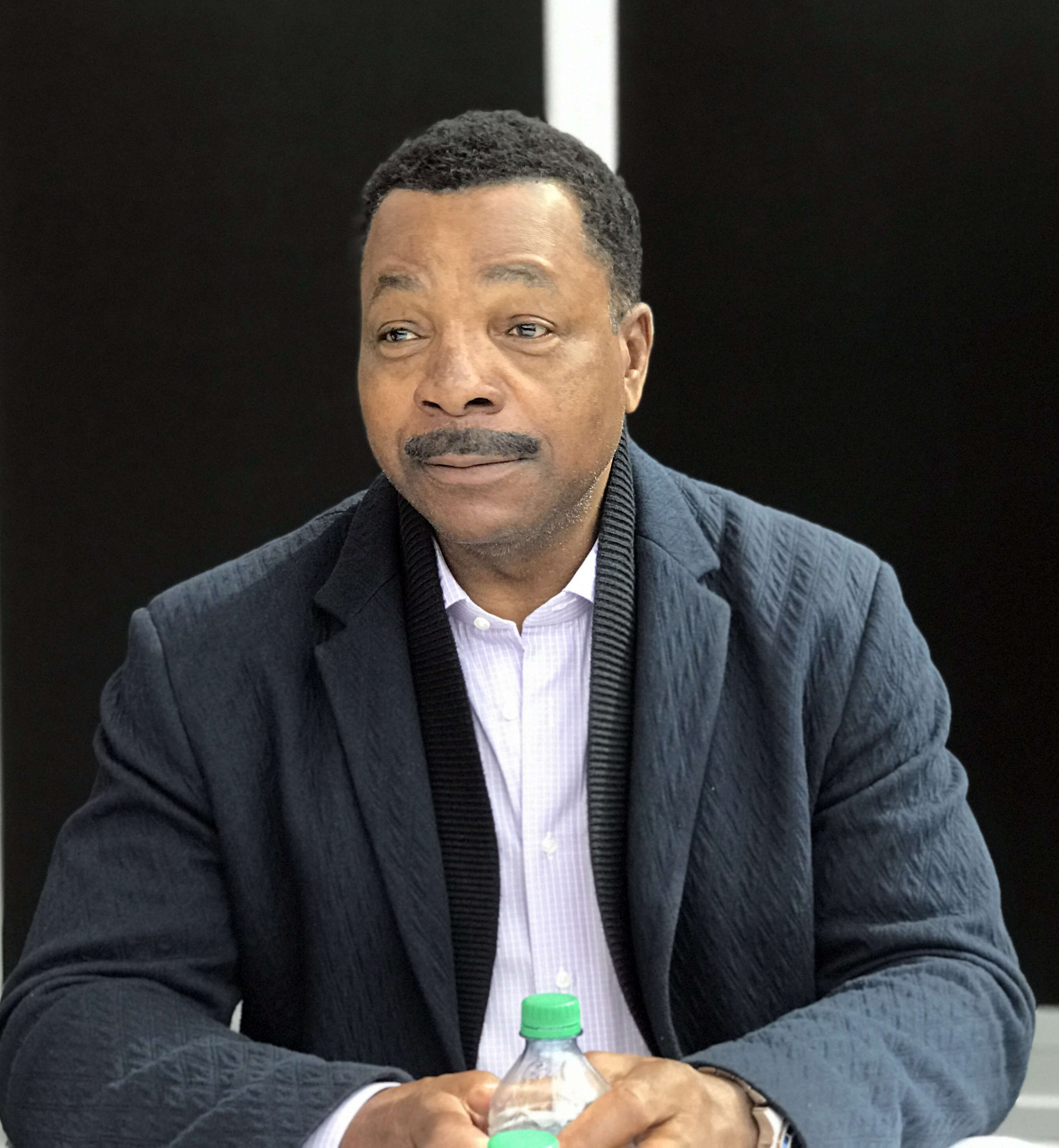
Carl Weathers directed the episode and appears as Greef Karga.

=== Development ===
The episode was written by the series' creator Jon Favreau and directed by Carl Weathers, who also co-stars in the episode as Greef Karga.

Inspired by the blue milk seen in Star Wars, Jon Favreau asked the prop master to bake blue macarons for The Child to eat. They were made for their look primarily and had only a mild raspberry flavor.

A crew member accidentally appeared in a shot during filming, in the background of the laboratory scene. The appearance of "Jeans guy" was compared to the accidental appearance of a coffee cup in an episode of Game of Thrones. Carl Weathers called it "A bogey", and Disney digitally removed it from the episode, in less than a week.

=== Casting ===
The co-starring actors cast for this episode are all returning from previous episodes, and include Gina Carano as Cara Dune, Carl Weathers as Greef Karga, Horatio Sanz as a Mythrol, Omid Abtahi as Dr. Pershing, and Giancarlo Esposito as Moff Gideon. Additional guest starring actors cast for this episode include Ryan Powers as an alien worker, Daniel Negrete as a school kid, Morgan Benoit as an Imperial Security Officer, Paul Sun-Hyung Lee returning as Captain Carson Teva, and Katy O'Brian as an Imperial Comms Officer. Lateef Crowder, Barry Lowin and Brendan Wayne are credited as stunt doubles for the Mandalorian. Chris Bartlett performed a teacher droid, voiced by Kathryn Elise Drexler. Amy Sturdivant, Gene Freeman, Dominique Price, and Tsuyoshi Abe are credited as stunt doubles for Cara Dune, Greef Karga, and the Mythrol, respectively. "The Child" was performed by various puppeteers.

=== Music ===
Ludwig Göransson composed the musical score for the episode. The featured tracks were released on November 20, 2020, in the first volume of the season two soundtrack.

== Reception ==
On Rotten Tomatoes, the episode received an approval rating of 92% based on reviews from 48 critics, with an average rating of 7.6/10. The website's critics consensus reads, "'The Siege' doesn't take the season by storm, but Carl Weathers' deft direction and some exciting character moments for Giancarlo Esposito make it another enjoyable installment."

Huw Fullerton of the Radio Times gave the episode 4 out of 5, and said that although some fans might be disappointed by having to wait before seeing Ahsoka Tano, he wrote: "For me Chapter 12 was one of the most significant episodes we've seen so far. As much as The Mandalorian thrives on older Star Wars connections, the fact that it also stands so well within its own canon and world-building can only be a good thing." Laura Prudom at IGN said Weathers "effortlessly evokes the iconography of the films here... None of it is particularly subtle, but it's deployed with enough adrenaline to make for an exhilarating ride." Alan Sepinwall of Rolling Stone praised Weathers calling his direction "terrific" as well as praising the digital effects and stunt teams. He suggested that the episode felt like a backdoor pilot for a show featuring Cara Dune. Louis Chilton of The Independent was frustrated that the episode was another side quest and took focus away from the main characters, "A five-minute-or-so stretch sees Mando's associates steal the limelight, but the sequence feels too much like a drab spin-off, a stark reminder of just how much The Mandalorian relies on its two leads."
