= List of The Mandalorian characters =

Four of the most prominent characters from The Mandalorian in a screenshot from the first season finale episode: from left to right, The Mandalorian, Grogu, Greef Karga, and Cara Dune.

The Mandalorian, an American space Western television series set in the Star Wars universe created by Jon Favreau and released on Disney+, features an extensive cast of characters. Since the show's debut on November 12, 2019, only one character has appeared in every episode: the protagonist and title character, a bounty hunter primarily known simply as "The Mandalorian" (Din Djarin). Grogu (The Child) is a young alien of the same species as Star Wars character Yoda and the show's hugely popular breakout character, colloquially known among the fandom as "Baby Yoda".

Several supporting characters appeared in at least three episodes of the first season of The Mandalorian, credited as co-starring. These include allies of the Mandalorian such as Cara Dune, Greef Karga, IG-11, Kuiil, and The Armorer. The primary villains of the series belong to a remnant of the Galactic Empire, which is led by Moff Gideon and includes such agents as The Client and Penn Pershing. A handful of guest characters made appearances in single episodes, including villagers from the planet Sorgan in "Chapter 4: Sanctuary", a band of mercenaries in "Chapter 6: The Prisoner", and several minor antagonists.

== Cast ==
List indicator

This section includes characters who will appear or have appeared in at least one season of the series.

- A green cell indicates the actor is a main cast member.
- A yellow cell indicates the actor is a featured cast member.
- A red cell indicates the actor is a recurring cast member.
- A light blue cell indicates the actor is a guest or special guest cast member.

=== Starring ===
Performer	Character	Seasons			The Mandalorian and Grogu
Performer	Character	1	2	3	The Mandalorian and Grogu
Pedro Pascal (Note: Suit performance by Brendan Wayne and stunts by Lateef Crowder.)	Din Djarin / The Mandalorian	Main	Main	Main	Starring
Various puppeteers (Note: Voiced by David Acord, with effects.)	Din Grogu	Main	Main	Main	Starring
Katee Sackhoff	Bo-Katan Kryze		Recurring	Main	
Jeremy Allen White	Rotta the Hutt				Starring
Jonny Coyne	Janu Coin			Guest	Starring
Martin Scorsese	Hugo Durant				Starring
Sigourney Weaver	Ward				Starring

=== Recurring co-stars ===
The following cast members have been credited as co-starring in at least two or more episodes within a season.

Performer	Character	Seasons			The Mandalorian and Grogu
Performer	Character	1	2	3	The Mandalorian and Grogu
Carl Weathers	Greef Karga	Recurring	Featured	Recurring	
Werner Herzog	The Client	Recurring			
Omid Abtahi	Penn Pershing	Recurring	Recurring	Featured	
Nick Nolte (voice) (Note: Performed by Misty Rosas.)	Kuiil	Recurring			
Taika Waititi (voice) (Note: Performed by Rio Hackford)	IG-11	Recurring		Recurring (Note: In season three, Taika Waititi is credited as guest starring.)	
Gina Carano	Cara Dune	Recurring	Recurring		
Giancarlo Esposito	Moff Gideon	Recurring	Recurring	Recurring	
Emily Swallow	The Armorer	Recurring (Note: In season one, Emily Swallow is credited as guest starring in episodes one and three and as co-starring in episode eight.)		Recurring	
Amy Sedaris	Peli Motto	Featured	Recurring	Featured	
Temuera Morrison	Boba Fett	Body double	Recurring		
Misty Rosas (Note: Voiced by Dee Bradley Baker.)	Frog Lady	Body double	Recurring		
Mercedes Varnado	Koska Reeves		Recurring	Recurring	
Ming-Na Wen	Fennec Shand	Featured	Recurring		
Katy M. O'Brian	Elia Kane		Recurring (Note: In season two, Katy M. O'Brian is credited as guest starring.)	Recurring	
Paul Sun-Hyung Lee	Carson Teva		Recurring (Note: In season two, Paul Sun-Hyung Lee is credited as guest starring.)	Recurring	Guest
Simon Kassianides	Axe Woves		Featured	Recurring	
Tait Fletcher (Note: Voiced by Jon Favreau (uncredited).)	Paz Vizsla	Guest		Recurring (Note: In season three, Tait Fletcher is credited as guest starring in episodes one, three, four and five and as co-starring in episode seven.)	

=== Featured co-stars ===
The following cast members have been credited as co-starring in a single episode within a season in which they play a significant role.

Performer	Character	Seasons			The Mandalorian and Grogu
Performer	Character	1	2	3	The Mandalorian and Grogu
Jake Cannavale	Toro Calican	Featured			
Mark Boone Junior	Ranzar Malk	Featured			
Bill Burr	Migs Mayfeld	Featured	Featured		
Natalia Tena	Xi'an	Featured			
Clancy Brown	Burg	Featured			
Richard Ayoade (voice)	Q9-0	Featured	Featured		
Ismael Cruz Córdova	Qin	Featured			
John Leguizamo (voice)	Gor Koresh		Featured		
Timothy Olyphant	Cobb Vanth		Featured		
Titus Welliver	Imperial Captain		Featured		
Horatio Sanz	Mythrol	Guest	Featured		
Michael Biehn	Lang		Featured		
Rosario Dawson	Ahsoka Tano		Featured		
Diana Lee Inosanto	Morgan Elsbeth		Featured		
Mark Hamill	Luke Skywalker		Featured		
Ahmed Best	Kelleran Beq			Featured	
Tim Meadows	Colonel Tuttle			Featured	
Jack Black	Captain Bombardier			Featured	
Lizzo	The Duchess			Featured	
Christopher Lloyd	Commissioner Helgait			Featured	
Steve Blum (voice)	Garazeb "Zeb" Orrelios			Guest	Supporting
Stephen McKinley Henderson (voice)	Gatori				Supporting
Hemky Madera	Barro			Guest	Supporting
Matthew Willig	Hogsbreth				Supporting

=== Recurring guest stars ===
Performer	Character	Seasons			The Mandalorian and Grogu
Performer	Character	1	2	3	The Mandalorian and Grogu
Wesley Kimmel	Ragnar Vizsla			Recurring	
Marti Matulis	Vane			Recurring	
Nonso Anozie (voice) (Note: Performed by Carey Jones.)	Gorian Shard			Recurring	
Dave Filoni	Trapper Wolf	Guest	Guest	Recurring	Guest

=== Minor guest stars ===
Performer	Character	Seasons			The Mandalorian and Grogu
Performer	Character	1	2	3	The Mandalorian and Grogu
Julia Jones	Omera	Guest			
Isla Farris	Winta	Guest			
Asif Ali	Caben	Guest			
Eugene Cordero	Stoke	Guest			
Rio Hackford	Riot Mar	Guest			
Matt Lanter	Lant Davan	Guest			
Rick Famuyiwa	Jib Dodger	Guest		Guest	Guest
Deborah Chow	Sash Ketter	Guest		Guest	Guest
Wing Tao Chao	Governor Wing		Guest		
Richard Brake	Valin Hess		Guest		
Matthew Wood	Bib Fortuna		Guest		
Max Lloyd-Jones	Lieutenant Reed			Guest	
Xander Berkeley	Gilad Pellaeon			Guest	
Brian Gleeson	Brendol Hux			Guest	
Lee Isaac Chung	Dok Suri				Guest

== Main characters ==
=== Din Djarin / The Mandalorian ===
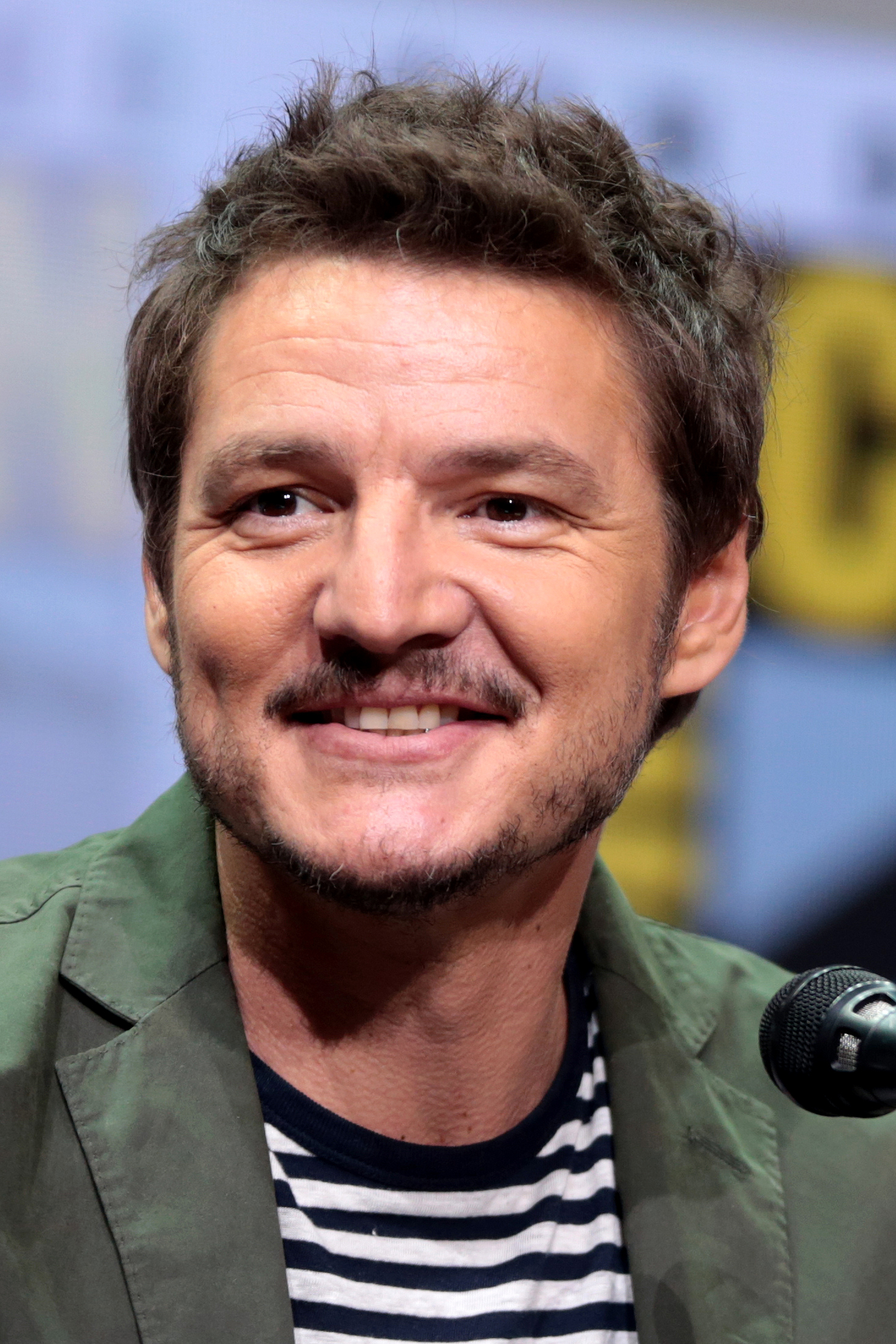
Pedro Pascal portrays and voices the title character of The Mandalorian.

The Mandalorian, sometimes abbreviated as Mando, is a sobriquet for Din Djarin, the protagonist of The Mandalorian television series. Introduced as a bounty hunter, he is a member of the Mandalorian culture, as evidenced by his beskar armor and his distinctive helmet, which he never removes in front of anyone. He was a "foundling" who was rescued at a young age by the Mandalorians and adopted into their culture prior to the events of the series, after his parents were murdered by Separatist battle droids during the Clone Wars, which resulted in his intense hatred of droids. In the television series, the Mandalorian encounters a young alien known as "The Child", whom he attempts to protect from a remnant of the now-fallen Galactic Empire.

The Mandalorian is portrayed and voiced by Pedro Pascal, and stunt actors Brendan Wayne and Lateef Crowder perform as body doubles when Pascal is unavailable. Pascal has cited Clint Eastwood as an influence on the character, and many comparisons have been drawn between the Mandalorian and Eastwood's Man with No Name. The Mandalorian creator Jon Favreau suggested Pascal watch Akira Kurosawa's samurai films and Eastwood's Spaghetti Westerns as preparation for the role. The Mandalorian character and Pascal's performance have been well received by audiences and critics.

=== Din Grogu ===
Grogu, also known as "The Child" and colloquially referred to by fans and the media as "Baby Yoda", is a young alien of the same species as popular Star Wars character Yoda. Although 50 years old, he is still an infant by the standards of his species, and although he cannot yet speak, he demonstrates a strong natural ability with The Force. A remnant of the Galactic Empire led by Moff Gideon is seeking the child to extract its blood for Dr. Pershing's secret experiments; the bounty hunter known as "The Mandalorian" is hired to track Grogu down. Instead of turning him over, however, the Mandalorian attempts to protect the child from the Imperials. By the end of the first season, the child is adopted into the Mandalorian culture as a "foundling", and the Mandalorian is tasked with reuniting the child with others of his kind.

The child has been hugely popular with fans and reviewers, becoming the show's breakout character, and the subject of many Internet memes. The character was conceived by Jon Favreau out of a desire to explore the mystery around Yoda and his species, and was developed in early conversations about the series between Favreau and executive producer Dave Filoni. The child is mostly a creation of animatronics and puppetry, although accentuated with computer-generated imagery. He is voiced by sound editor David Acord with the aid of various sound effects. The Guardian called Baby Yoda "2019's biggest new character", and many have described him as a key part in the success of the Disney+ streaming service.

=== Bo-Katan Kryze ===
Bo-Katan Kryze is a Mandalorian warrior and the former ruler of Mandalore from House Kryze who appears in "Chapter 11: The Heiress" and "Chapter 16: The Rescue". Bo-Katan is portrayed by Katee Sackhoff, who previously voiced the character in animated form in Star Wars: The Clone Wars and Star Wars Rebels. In the third season, Bo-Katan is credited as a main cast member, the first character other than the Mandalorian and Grogu to be credited as anything other than co-starring.

In "Chapter 11: The Heiress", Bo-Katan and the Nite Owls rescue The Mandalorian and The Child. She introduces herself, revealing her heritage as a Mandalorian, and that Din Djarin's group are zealots who wish to restore ancient Mandalorian traditions. The Mandalorian leaves rejecting their help. Later Bo-Katan and the Nite Owls again rescue The Mandalorian. In return for information he reluctantly agrees to help them seize a shipment of weapons. During the raid Bo-Katan changes plan, deciding to take the whole ship, not just the weapons. When they capture the bridge, Bo-Katan interrogates the head officer, wanting to know about the Dark Saber. Bo-Katan was impressed by the Mandalorian and invites him to join them, but he must continue his quest, so she tells him to go to the forest planet of Corvus, to find the Jedi Ahsoka Tano. In "Chapter 16" Bo-Katan helps The Mandalorian to rescue The Child from Moff Gideon.

In season 3, the Mandalorian sets out on a pilgrimage to the mines of Mandalore and needs Bo-Katan's help. At first she refuses, but when the Mandalorian gets into trouble, he sends Grogu to get her help, and she races to Mandalore and saves him. They find the Living Waters and the Mandalorian bathes in the waters, only to fall into it. Bo-Katan saves him again and as they return to Bo-Katan's home, they are attacked by Imperials and her home is destroyed. The Mandalorian takes her to the Mandalorian hideout, where he delivers proof of his pilgrimage and Bo-Katan is also accepted as she too bathed in the Waters. In the season finale, Bo-Katan becomes the one who reunite all Mandalorians as The Armorer predicted to her.

== Recurring characters ==
Several characters have been featured in more than one episode within a season of The Mandalorian.

=== Introduced in season one ===
==== Greef Karga ====
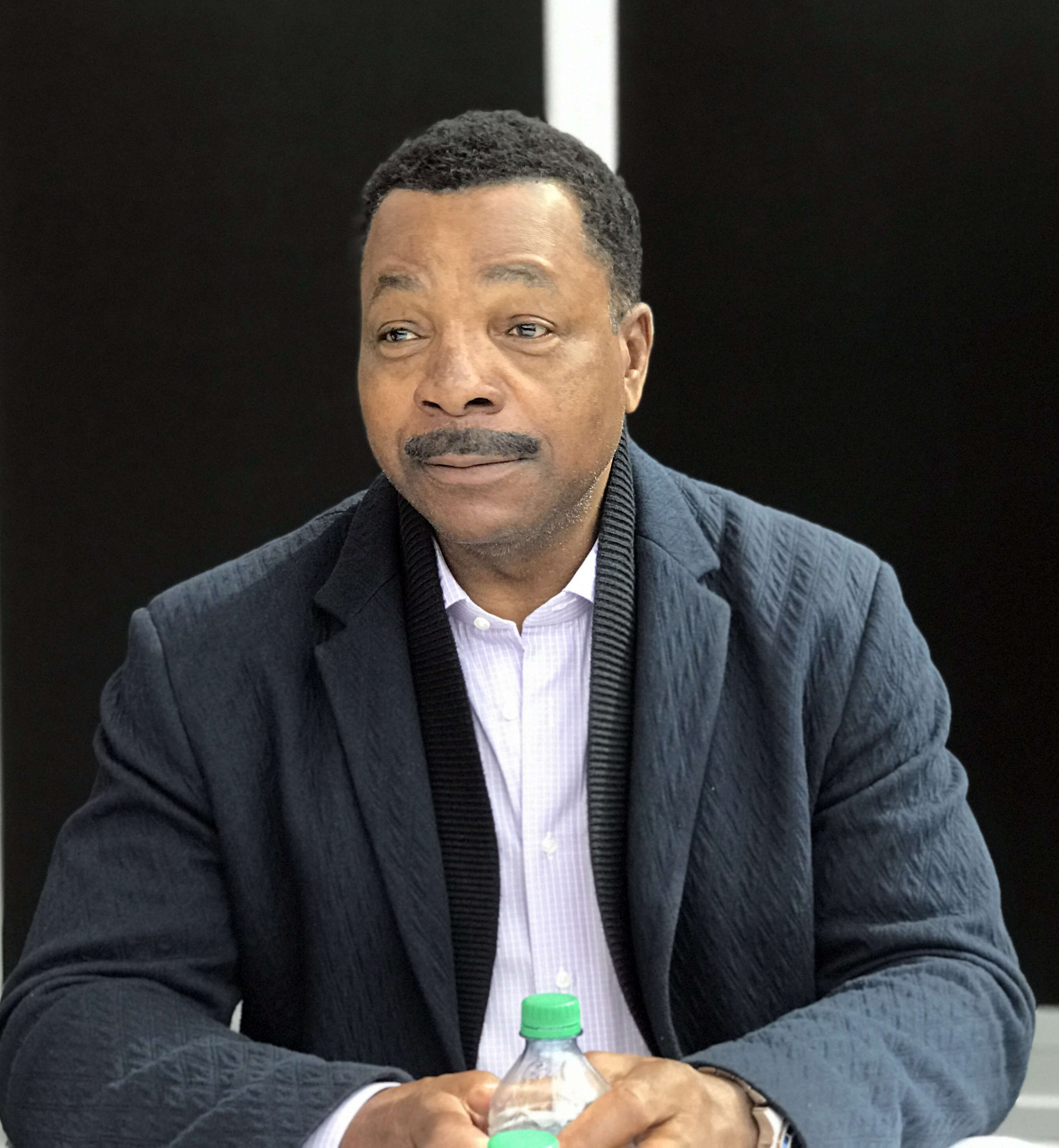
Carl Weathers plays Greef Karga, a leader of the Bounty Hunters' Guild.

Greef Karga is a leader of the Bounty Hunters' Guild, who serves as both an ally and adversary to the Mandalorian at different points in the show's first season. Operating out of the planet Nevarro, Greef gives assignments to bounty hunters and ensures everyone follows the guild's code. Greef provides the assignment that leads the Mandalorian to meet the Child. When the Mandalorian refuses to turn the Child over to the Imperials, Greef leads a group of bounty hunters in an unsuccessful attempt to take the Child from him. Greef later devises a plan to kill the Mandalorian and return the Child to the Imperials, but when the Child saves his life, Greef has a change of heart and helps protect him from the Empire while becoming a better man.

In season 2 and onwards, he becomes the Magistrate of Navarro.

In season 3 after the pirate siege on Nevarro and Gorian Shard's death, Karga makes peace with Vizla and his clan as he did with Djarin.

Greef Karga is portrayed by Carl Weathers, whom Jon Favreau knew through the Directors Guild of America. Weathers accepted the part under the condition that he could direct future episodes of The Mandalorian in the second season. Greef was originally to appear only in a handful of episodes, but Favreau and the writers liked the character so much that the part was expanded. Weathers performs his own stunts in the role. The character has received generally positive feedback from fans and reviewers.

==== The Client ====
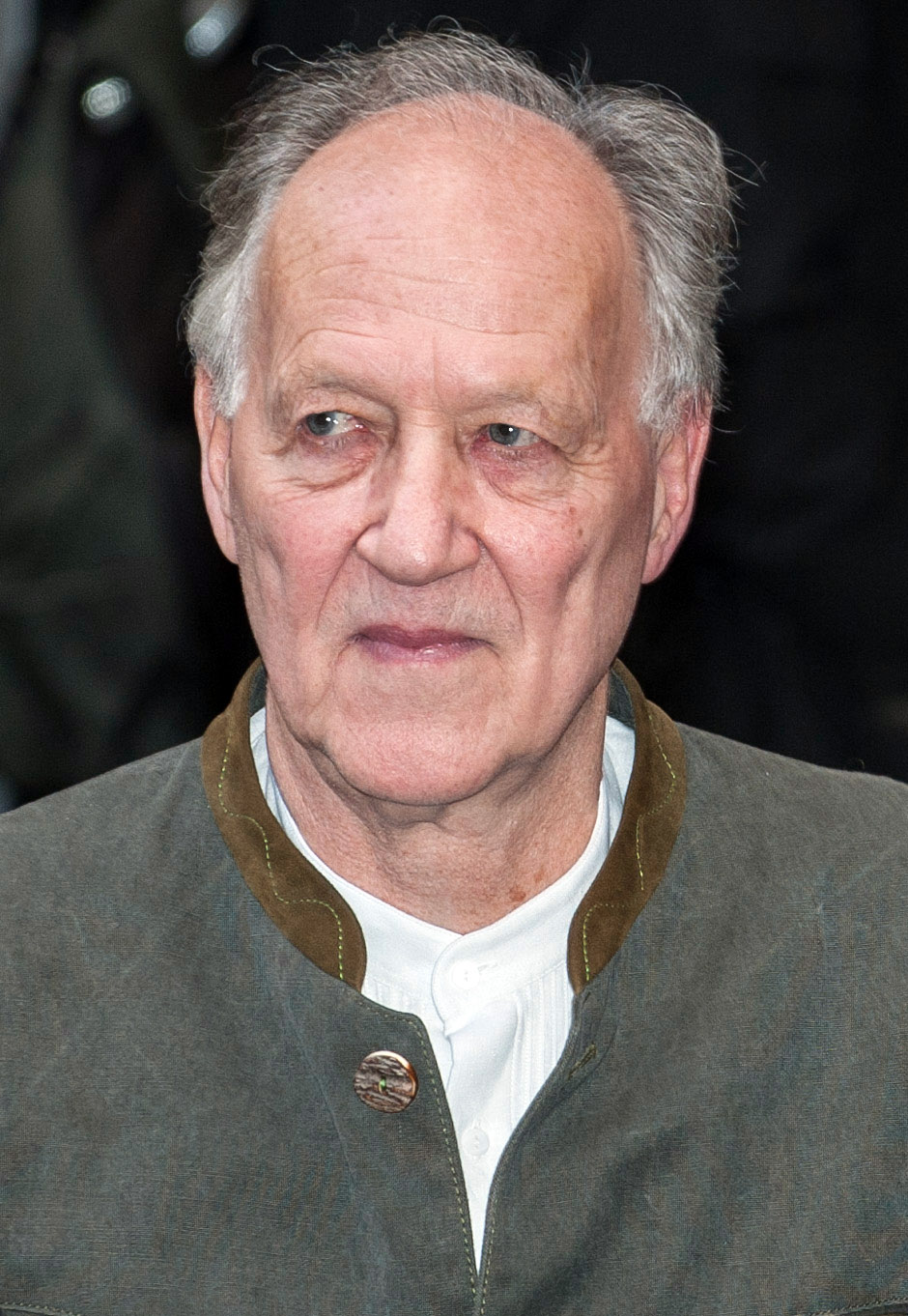
German film director Werner Herzog portrayed The Client.

The Client is a mysterious and unnamed agent of the Imperial remnant. He hires the Mandalorian, as well as several other bounty hunters, to recover the Child on behalf of his superior, Moff Gideon. The Client does not reveal why he wants the Child, but he orders his colleague, Dr. Pershing, to "extract the necessary material" from him. The Mandalorian delivers the Child to the Client, but later rescues him back. The Client conspires to recapture the Mandalorian and the Child, but after the Mandalorian returns to him, the Client is shot and killed by death troopers under Gideon's orders.

The Client is portrayed by German film director Werner Herzog, who was recruited for the part by Jon Favreau. Herzog accepted the role in part to help finance his film Family Romance, LLC (2019). Herzog was not familiar with Favreau's previous work, nor had he ever seen a Star Wars film, but he was impressed with the screenplays and filmmaking style of The Mandalorian. Herzog strongly urged the show's filmmakers to use puppetry for the Child character and not computer-generated imagery, calling them "cowards" for considering using CGI in its place. The Client character and Herzog's performance have received generally positive reviews from critics.

==== Penn Pershing ====
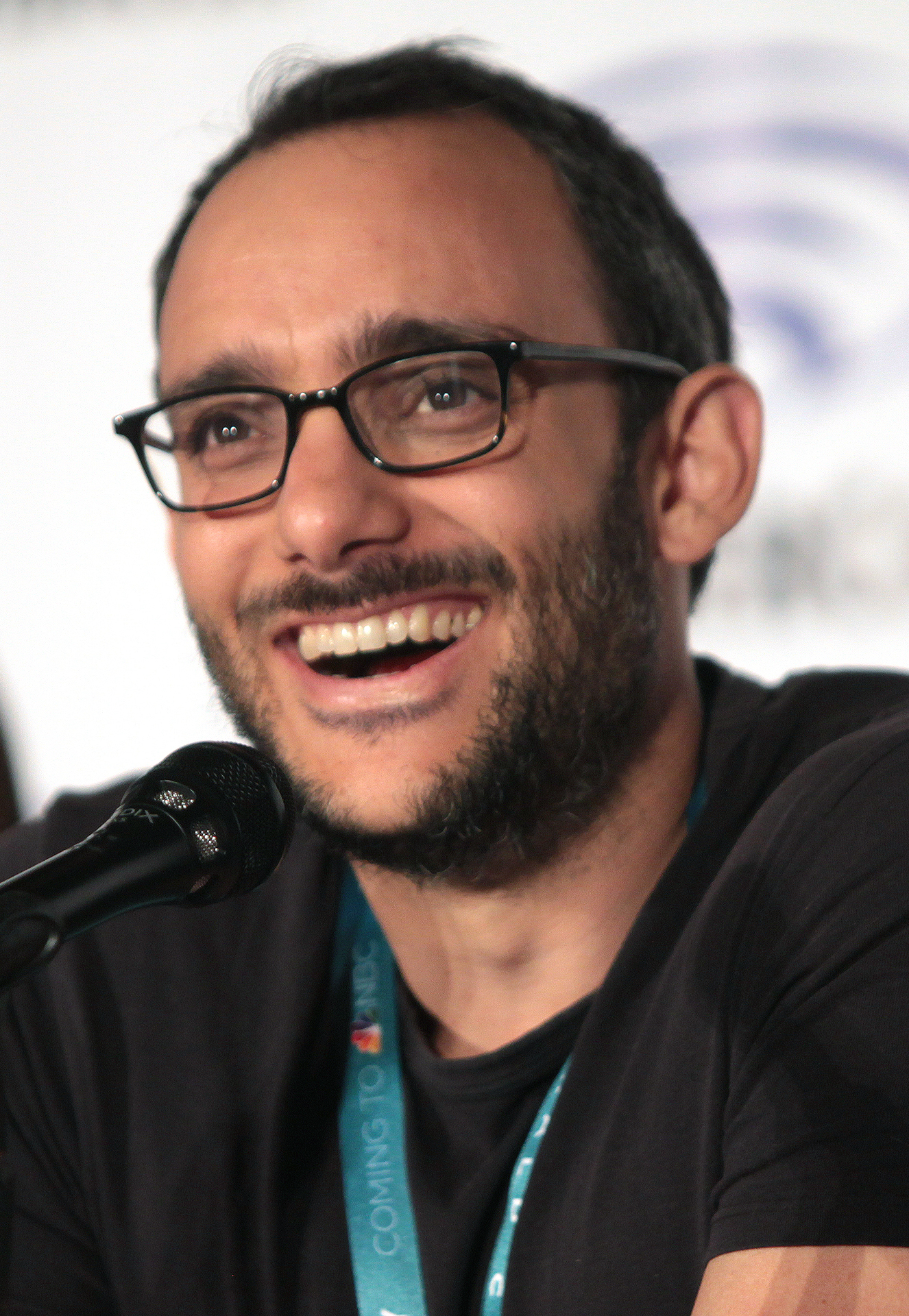
Dr. Pershing is portrayed by Omid Abtahi.

Dr. Penn Pershing is a doctor and scientist affiliated with the Imperial remnant who works with the Client in his attempts to capture the Child. He has appeared in several episodes of The Mandalorian, starting with the series premiere "Chapter 1: The Mandalorian", in which he is present on an Imperial compound on Nevarro when the Client hires the Mandalorian to track down and deliver the Child. When the Client says he is willing to pay half-price for proof of termination, Pershing objects and says the child should be delivered alive. Pershing appears again in "Chapter 3: The Sin", when the Mandalorian delivers the Child to the Client. Later, when discussing the Child, the Client orders Pershing to "extract the necessary material and be done with it", but Pershing again protests, noting their employer has explicitly ordered them to bring the Child back alive. The Mandalorian later returns to the Imperial compound to rescue the child, killing all the stormtroopers there and finding Pershing with the Child, who is sedated and strapped into laboratory equipment. When the Mandalorian threatens Pershing, the scientist pleads for mercy and insists he protected the Child and prevented him from being killed. The Mandalorian takes the Child and leaves Pershing unharmed.

Dr. Pershing returns in season two. The Mandalorian witnesses a hologram recording of Pershing, who is providing an update to Moff Gideon on his experiments involving Grogu's blood. When the Dark Troopers apprehend Grogu, Gideon instructs his Comms officer to inform Dr. Pershing of Grogu's retrieval. In the season finale, Pershing is captured by the Mandalorian and his companions; he helps his captors infiltrate Gideon's ship to rescue Grogu.

In season three, Pershing resides on Coruscant after being pardoned and enrolled in an amnesty program by the New Republic. He is surprised to find Elia Kane, Gideon's former communications officer, as a fellow participant in the program, and the two become friends. Kane helps Pershing find a way to surreptitiously continue his cloning research, but reveals herself to be working for the New Republic and betrays him to the authorities. Pershing undergoes a mind-wipe as punishment, but Kane secretly sabotages the procedure, significantly worsening its effect.

Pershing is portrayed by Omid Abtahi, who previously voiced a Mandalorian character named Amis in the animated series Star Wars: The Clone Wars. Pershing's costume includes a patch on his right arm with an insignia similar to one worn by clones in the cloning facility on the planet Kamino in the prequel film Star Wars: Episode II – Attack of the Clones. This has led to speculation among some fans and writers that Pershing's plans for the Child involve cloning. Pershing also wears glasses, making him the first human live-action character in Disney's Star Wars canon to do so. This was contrary to a rule Star Wars creator George Lucas imposed, before selling the franchise to Disney, that no character wear glasses in the Star Wars universe. Pershing's costume, which also included a grey shirt with white shoulders and a high collar, was ranked eighth on a Screen Rant list of the ten best costumes in the first season of The Mandalorian. Inverse writer Allie Gemmill called Dr. Pershing an interesting character, particularly due to the mystery behind his possible association with Kamino.

==== Kuiil ====
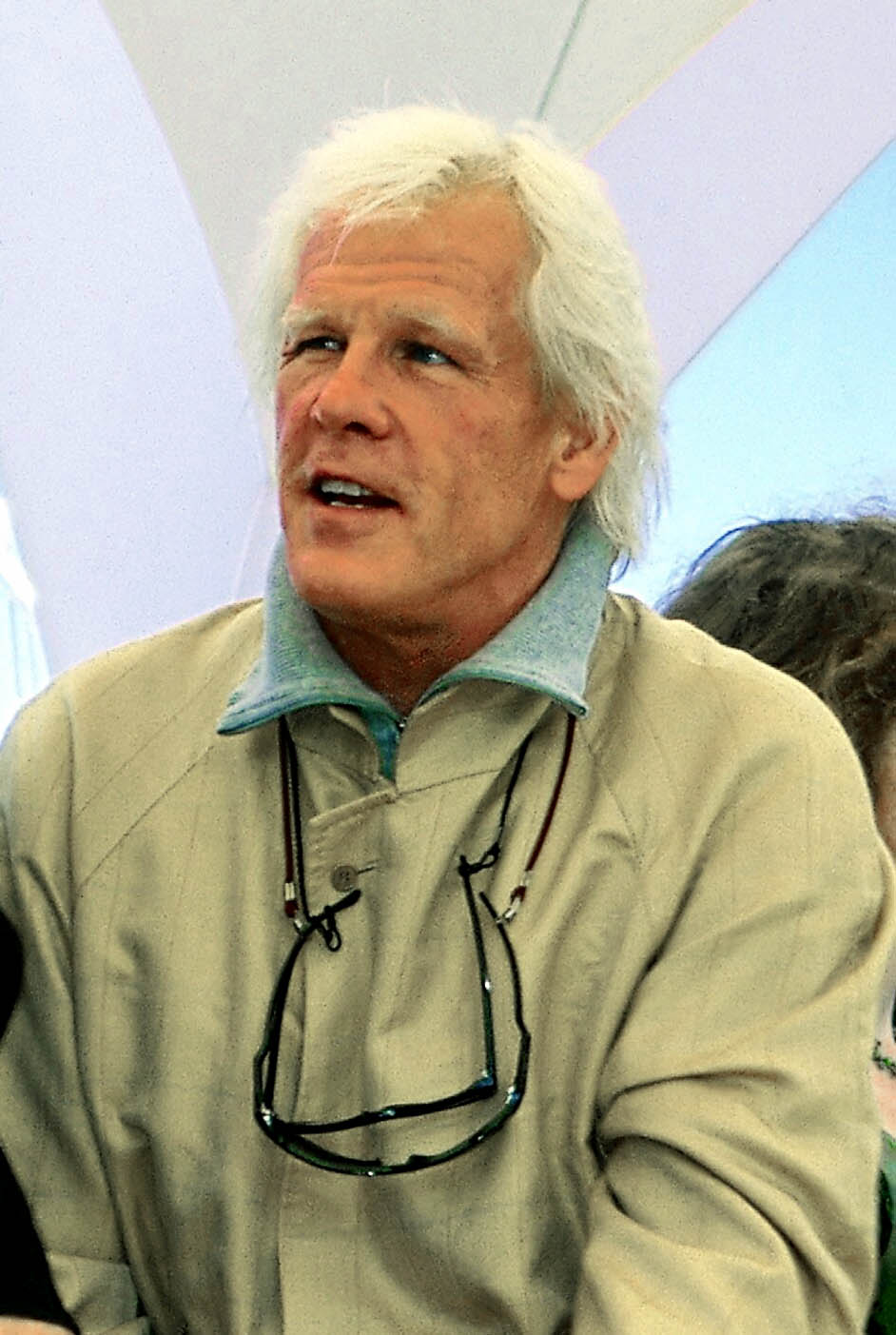
Nick Nolte provided the voice of Kuiil, recording all the character's dialogue in one afternoon.

Kuiil is an alien of the Ugnaught species, and a former indentured servant of the Galactic Empire. He is living in solitude on the planet Arvala-7 when he encounters the Mandalorian, who comes to the planet to find and capture the Child. Kuiil assists him, and then later helps him rebuild his ship when it is dismantled by Jawas. Kuiil also rebuilds the bounty hunter droid IG-11 after the Mandalorian destroys him. Kuiil and IG-11 later join the Mandalorian on a mission to protect the Child from the Imperial remnant on the planet Nevarro, where Kuiil is shot and killed by Imperial Scout Troopers while attempting to bring the Child to safety.

Kuiil is voiced by Nick Nolte, who completed his recordings for all the character's dialogue in a single afternoon. Kuiil's on-set performance was done by Misty Rosas, who during filming wore a face mask brought to life through animatronics and puppetry, with its electronics and wires concealed in the backpack and pockets of Kuiil's costume. Kuiil has been received positively by reviewers and fans alike. Several critics have called him the best character on the show, and his signature line "I have spoken" became one of the better-known and best-liked lines of dialogue from the series.

==== IG-11 ====
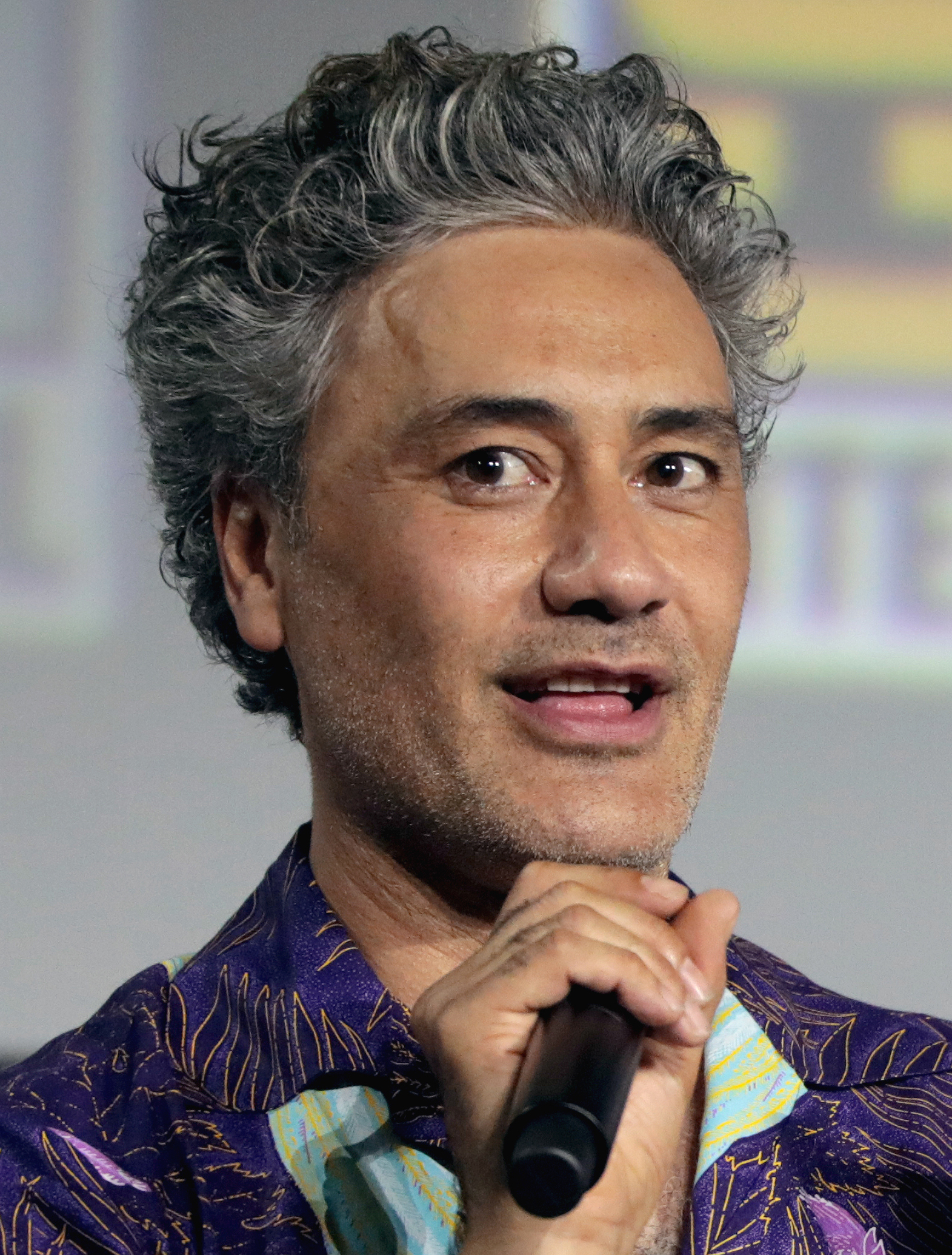
IG-11 was voiced by Taika Waititi, who also directed an episode of The Mandalorian.

IG-11 is a bounty hunter droid who initially attempts to capture and kill the Child, but is later reprogrammed to become its nurse and protector. The Mandalorian first encounters IG-11 when both attempt to collect the bounty on the Child. They work together to extract the Child from a gang of mercenaries, but when IG-11 tries to kill the Child, the Mandalorian instead shoots and kills the droid. IG-11's remains are recovered by Kuiil, who repairs and reprograms him. The droid later joins the Mandalorian on a mission to Nevarro to protect the Child from the Imperial remnant, and though the Mandalorian does not initially trust him, IG-11 ultimately sacrifices his own life to protect the Child and his allies. In the season 3 finale, IG-11 is finally rebuilt and becomes new marshal of Nevarro.

IG-11 is voiced by Taika Waititi, who was offered the part by Jon Favreau based on their work together on Marvel films. Rio Hackford provides the motion-capture for IG-11. Waititi said he tried to create a voice that lacked human emotion while still maintaining some semblance of humanity, describing it as a cross between Siri and HAL 9000. IG-11 was mistaken for the Star Wars bounty hunter IG-88 when first unveiled due to the resemblance between the two characters. IG-11 has been received positively by reviewers and fans alike, with some calling him one of the best droids in the franchise.

==== The Armorer ====
The Armorer is the leader of a tribe of Mandalorian warriors on Nevarro, which includes the show's title character. She provides spiritual guidance for the clan, and forges and repairs their armor, including a new set of armor she makes for the Mandalorian. In the first season finale "Chapter 8: Redemption", the Armorer instructs the Mandalorian to watch over and protect the Child, and to reunite the Child with others of his own kind. The character was partially inspired by the films of Akira Kurosawa, as well as the history and culture of the samurai, particularly in the character's deliberately paced movement and aura of authority.

The Armorer is portrayed by Emily Swallow, who provides both the character's voice and live-action performance, while her stunts are performed by Lauren Mary Kim. When Swallow auditioned for the role, she knew little about the character and did not know it was for a Star Wars series. Aspects of The Mandalorian director Deborah Chow's personality influenced Swallow's portrayal of the character. Kim's combat style in the Armorer's fight scenes was inspired by the Filipino martial art known as Kali. The Armorer has been received positively by fans and reviewers alike, and has been described as a fan favorite.

==== Cara Dune ====
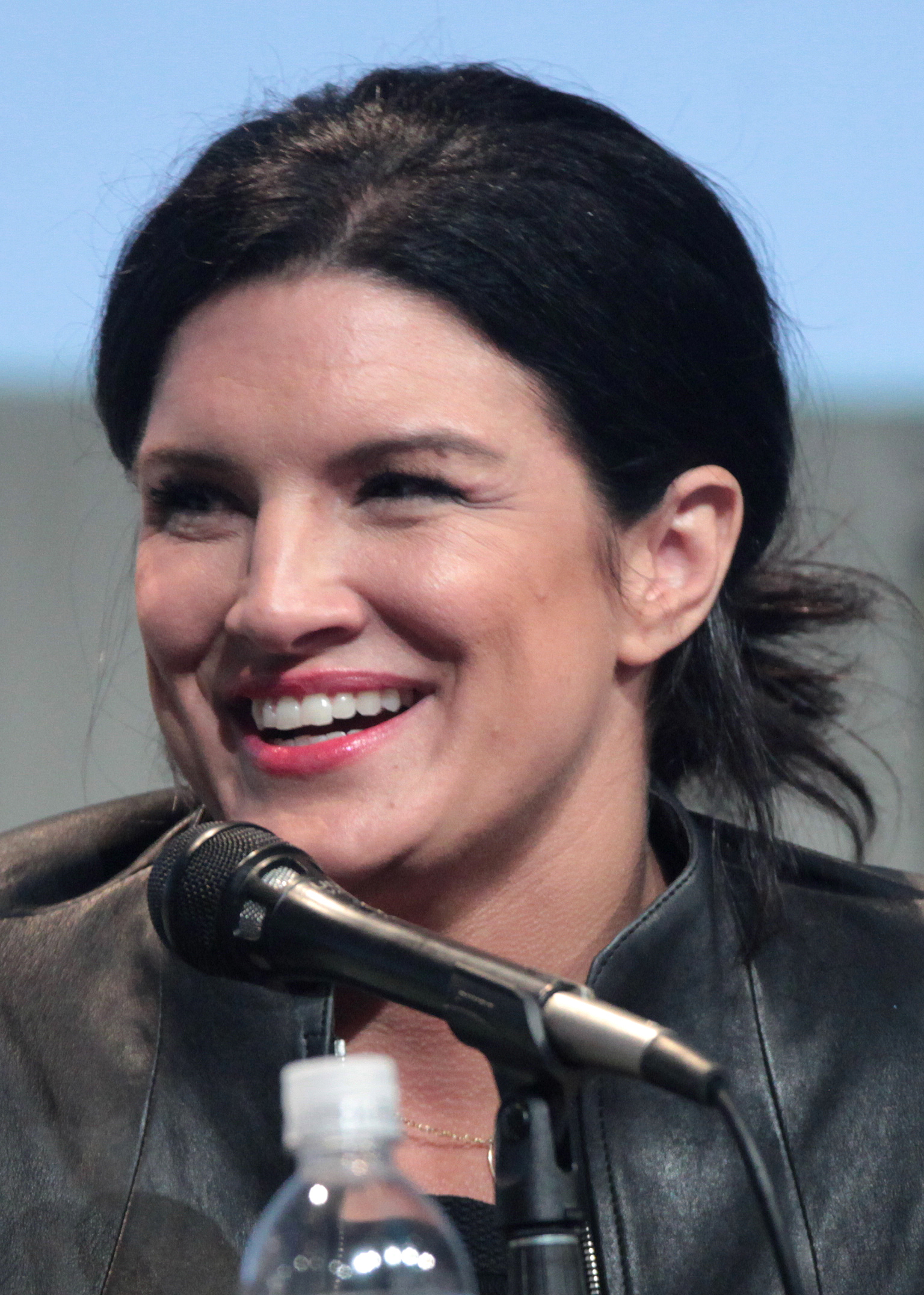
Former mixed martial artist Gina Carano portrayed Cara Dune.

Cara Dune is a former Rebel shock trooper from Alderaan who became a mercenary after the fall of the Empire. Originally from Alderaan, Cara is a highly trained warrior and skilled battle tactician. She harbors an intense hatred for the Galactic Empire, and is having trouble readjusting to post-war life. Cara first encounters the Mandalorian on the planet Sorgan, where they work together to protect a local village from raiders. He later recruits her to help protect the Child from the Imperial remnant.

Cara is portrayed by former mixed martial artist Gina Carano, for whom Favreau specifically created the character, without auditioning any other actresses. Favreau sought to create a powerful and independent character, but one different from Princess Leia or other strong Star Wars female characters. Carano performed many of her own stunts, and she credits Bryce Dallas Howard, who directed the character's first appearance in "Chapter 4: Sanctuary", with helping translate the character from the script to the screen. Cara has been received positively by reviewers and fans, and has been described as a feminist role model. Some critics called her unique even among the Star Wars franchise's female characters due to her physicality and combat skills.

==== Peli Motto ====
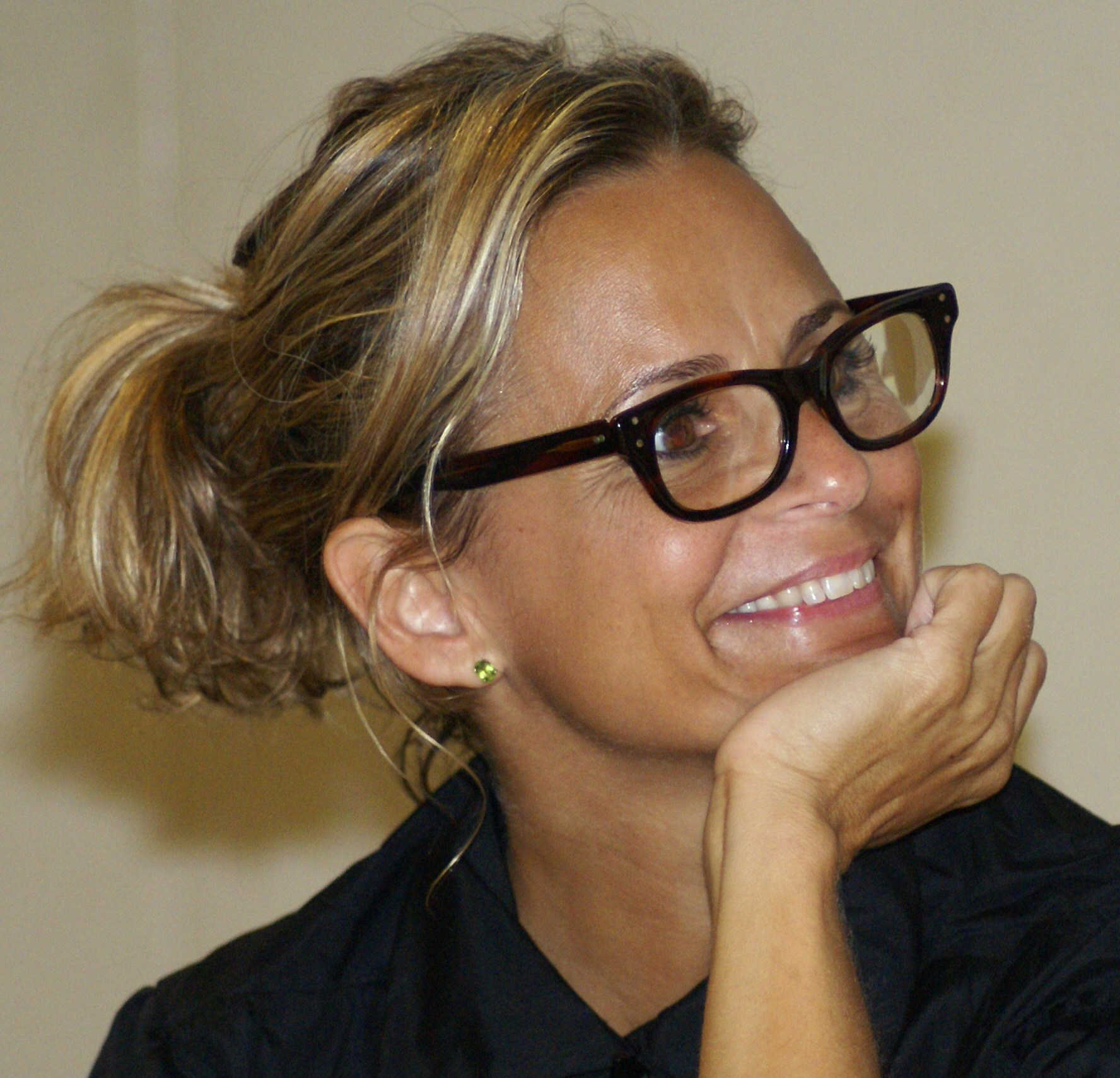
Peli Motto is portrayed by comedian and actress Amy Sedaris.

Peli Motto is a mechanic who manages a spaceport on Tatooine and is featured in "Chapter 5: The Gunslinger", "Chapter 9: The Marshal" and "Chapter 10: The Passenger". The Mandalorian hires her to repair his ship, and she also comes to take care of the Child. The bounty hunter Toro Calican briefly takes Peli and the Child as hostages in an unsuccessful attempt to abduct the Mandalorian. When the Mandalorian returns to Tatooine in search of another rumored to be there, Peli guides him to Mos Pelgo, where he finds Cobb Vanth with Boba Fett's armor. She later gives him the task of taking the Frog Lady to Trask, where her husband knows other Mandalorians' whereabouts.

Peli is portrayed by actress and comedian Amy Sedaris, who had previously worked with The Mandalorian creator Jon Favreau on the film Elf (2003). Sedaris said she enjoyed working with the animatronic Child puppet, which she said made everyone on the set happy: "The minute you looked into Baby Yoda's eyes you just got lost." The character and Sedaris' performance drew acclaim from fans and reviewers, (Note: Sean Keane of CNET said Sedaris was "excellent" as Peli, writing that she "oozes charisma" and displayed general warmth in her scenes with the Child. Vulture writer Jackson McHenry said the character was effective because she bears similarities to Sedaris' real-life persona, including her "semi-ironic detachment and amusement". Keith Phipps, also of Vulture, said Peli was a multifaceted character, showing sympathy for the Child while simultaneously appearing shrewd and vaguely threatening while negotiating with the Mandalorian. Jason Wiese of CinemaBlend described Peli as "joyously funny" and said she would enjoy seeing a spin-off series focusing specifically on her. Rachel Leishman of The Mary Sue said she loved Sedaris' appearance, saying the actress brought "the Amy Sedaris energy we know and love" to the part. Gizmodo writer Germain Lussier called Sedaris' casting another example of the "kind of odd, yet wonderful intersection of Star Wars and comedy" prevalent in The Mandalorian. Many fans and reviewers complimented Peli Motto's wig, while others said her hair and jumpsuit-like costume bore similarities to Alien franchise protagonist Ellen Ripley. Peli Motto was in included Vulture's list of the show's 15 best cameo appearances from season one, and her costume was ranked fifth on a Screen Rant list of the ten best costumes in the first season of The Mandalorian.) so much so that Sedaris became a trending topic on Twitter after the episode first became available.

Peli appears in the fifth episode of The Book of Boba Fett, "Chapter 5: Return of the Mandalorian". Peli has kept her shop open and gains additional help from Jawas who bring her pieces of scrap. She helps customize an anabolic starfighter for Din Djarin, which he later uses. The episode also reveals that Peli dated a Jawa at some point before the events of The Mandalorian. She refers to the Jawa she dated as "furry".

==== Paz Vizsla ====
Paz Vizsla is one of the warriors in the Mandalorian tribe on Nevarro. Strong and physically imposing, he is a heavy infantry fighter. He appears in the episode "Chapter 3: The Sin", where he initially quarrels with the Mandalorian for working with the Empire, but later comes to his assistance when the Mandalorian is being attacked.

In the first season of The Mandalorian and The Book of Boba Fett, Paz Vizsla is voiced by an uncredited Jon Favreau, who previously voiced a similarly named Mandalorian warlord named Pre Vizsla on the series Star Wars: The Clone Wars. Stunt performer and former mixed martial artist Tait Fletcher was the live-action body double for Paz Vizsla.

==== Fennec Shand ====
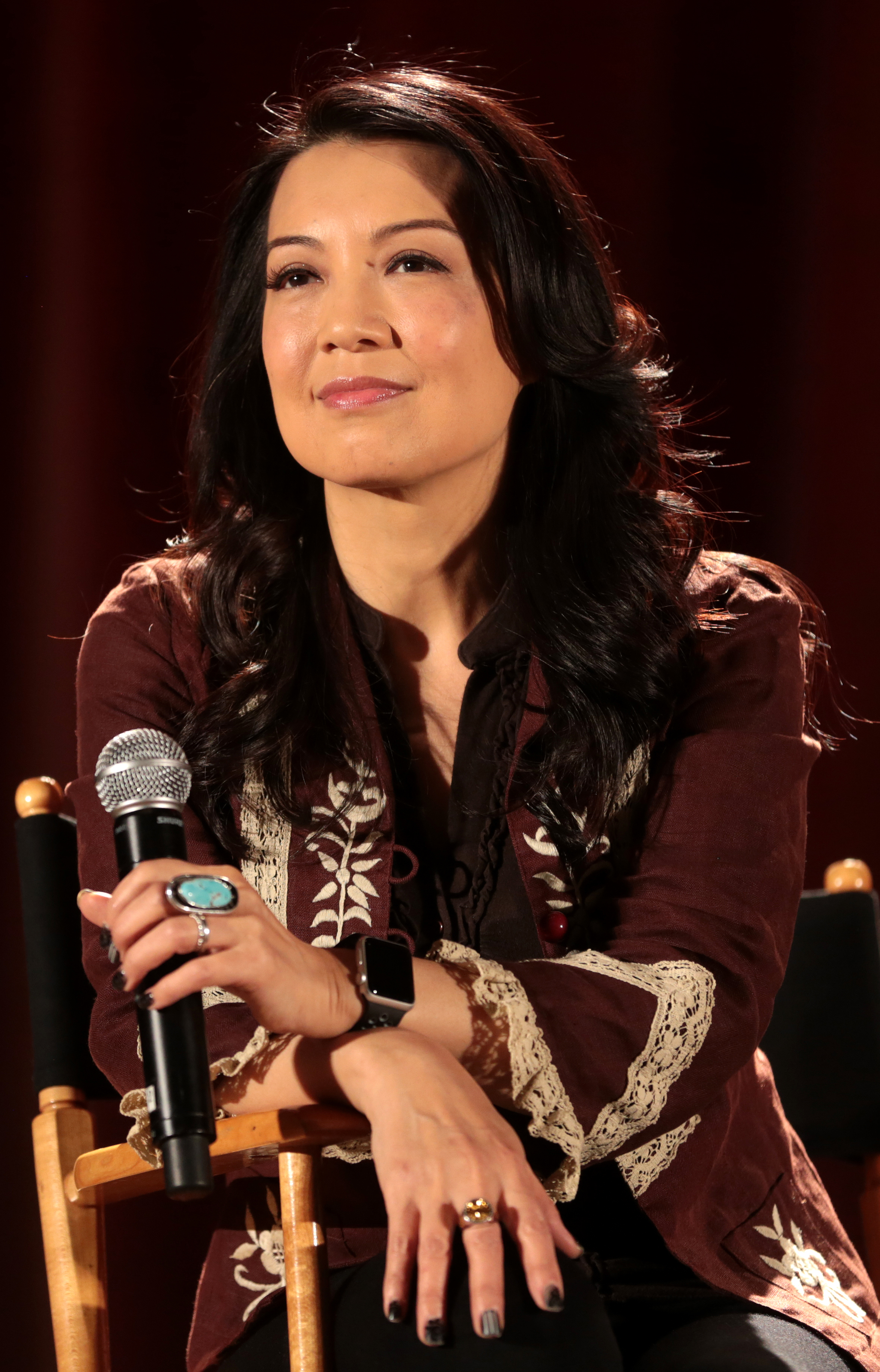
Fennec Shand is portrayed by Ming-Na Wen, and is the first major Star Wars villain character portrayed by an Asian actress.

Fennec Shand is an assassin and mercenary for the galaxy's top crime syndicates, who is sought by Toro Calican for his first bounty hunting assignment. Calican catches Fennec with assistance from the Mandalorian. When Fennec tries to convince Toro to free her so they could capture the Mandalorian and deliver him to the Bounty Hunters' Guild, Toro instead kills Fennec and seeks to capture the Mandalorian himself. Her body is later approached by an unidentified character.

It is later revealed that this character was Boba Fett, who patched her up with some cybernetics. In "Chapter 14: The Tragedy", Fennec accompanied Boba Fett to Tython in order to reclaim his armor from the Mandalorian's ship. During a standoff with the Mandalorian, the three of them come under attack by the stormtroopers dispatched by Moff Gideon. Fennec managed to decimate some stormtroopers, which also involved sending a boulder into their machine gun. When the Dark Troopers make off with Grogu and the Razor Crest is destroyed, Fennec and Boba Fett declare themselves in the Mandalorian's debt and agree to help him rescue Grogu.

Portrayed by actress Ming-Na Wen, Fennec Shand is the first major Star Wars villain character portrayed by an Asian actress. Elements of the character's personality were inspired by characteristics of the fennec fox, including its trickiness, stealthiness, maneuverability, and ability to survive. The fox also influenced the design of Fennec's costume and hairstyle. Costume designer Joseph Porro incorporated orange accents into Fennec's black costume, and Wen recommended the character's hair include braids inspired by the fennec fox. Fennec Shand has been received positively by reviewers and fans alike, and has been described as a fan favorite. Several reviewers felt the character was eliminated too quickly and did not get the chance to live up to her potential, and some critics have speculated that the character could still be alive.

This is confirmed in the second-season episode "Chapter 14: The Tragedy" that Fennec Shand is alive, discovered and saved by Boba Fett before her injuries proved fatal.

==== Moff Gideon ====
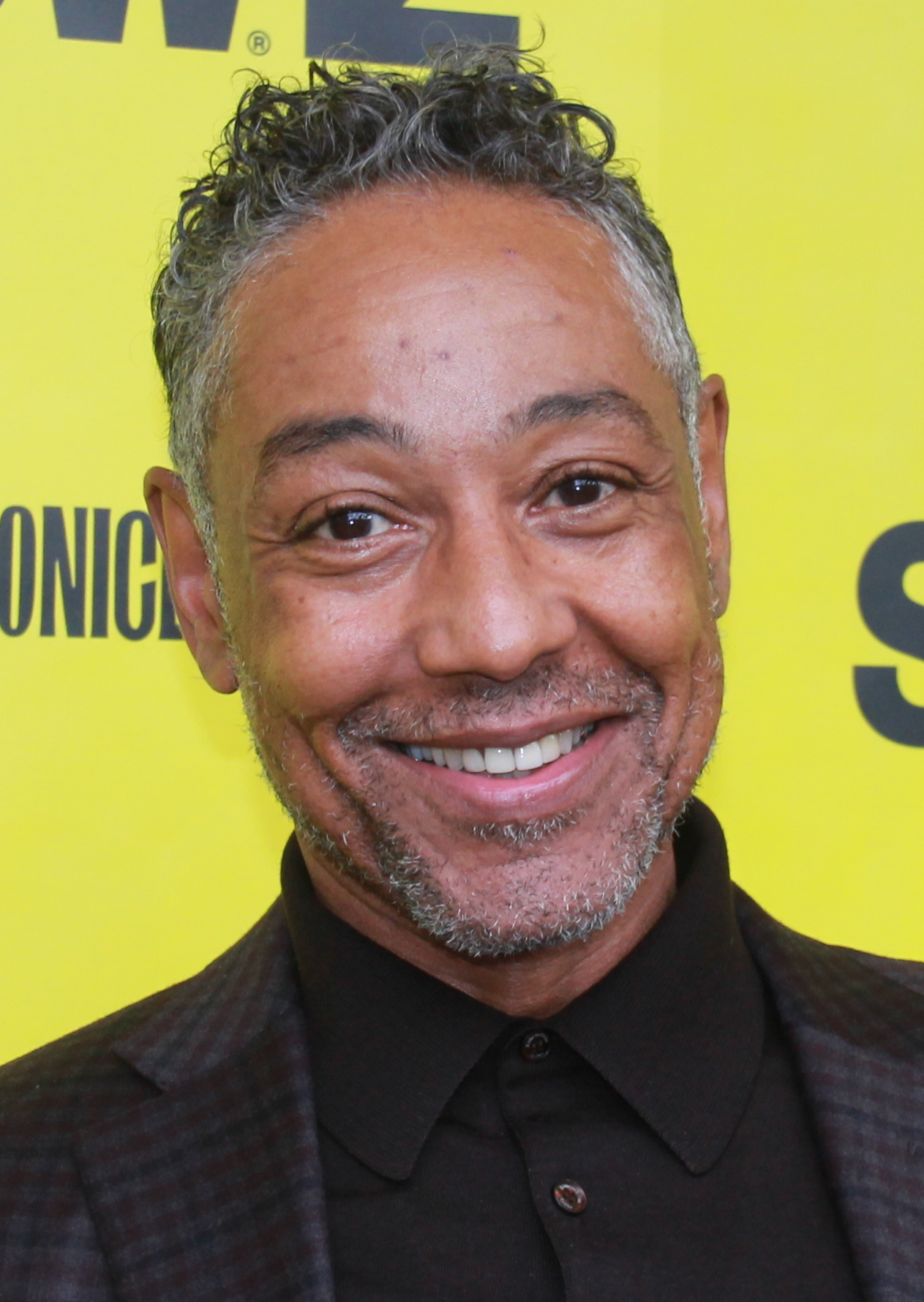
Giancarlo Esposito, who had previously worked with Jon Favreau on several projects, portrayed Moff Gideon.

Moff Gideon is the leader of an Imperial remnant and the primary antagonist of The Mandalorian. Few details of his backstory have yet been revealed. He was previously an operative in the Imperial Security Bureau, a covert intelligence arm and secret police for the Empire, and played a role in past efforts to eliminate the Mandalorians. In The Mandalorian, Moff Gideon is attempting to abduct the Child to extract its blood for experimentation. In the first season, Gideon briefly traps the Mandalorian and his allies on Nevarro in an unsuccessful attempt to obtain the Child. Gideon reveals he knows secret details about the Mandalorian and his allies, and is the first character in the series to reveal the Mandalorian's real name, Din Djarin. In the final scene of the first season finale "Chapter 8: Redemption", it is revealed that Gideon possesses the Darksaber, a Mandalorian lightsaber.

Gideon returns in the second season as he continues to track down Grogu. "Chapter 12: The Siege" reveals that Gideon requires access to Grogu's blood, which contains a high 'M-count', for it to be transfused into a test subject. However, the experiments have thus far resulted in "catastrophic failure". Later in the season, Gideon apprehends Grogu and seeks to continue the experimentation, but the Mandalorian captures Dr. Pershing and infiltrates Gideon's ship. Gideon battles the Mandalorian with the Darksaber, but is ultimately defeated. As a platoon of Dark Troopers attempt to rescue him, Luke Skywalker arrives and destroys the droids. Gideon attempts suicide, but is incapacitated by Cara Dune. Grogu is taken by Skywalker to be trained as a Jedi.

In season three, Carson Teva finds Moff Gideon's transport adrift where Gideon's body is nowhere to be found. Moff Gideon is killed in the season finale during the battle for the Reconquest of Mandalore.

Gideon is portrayed by Giancarlo Esposito. He was recruited for the part by Jon Favreau, who had previously worked with Esposito on several projects. Gideon has been received positively by reviewers and fans.

=== Introduced in season two ===
==== Boba Fett ====
Boba Fett is a Mandalorian bounty hunter who first appeared in The Empire Strikes Back. Having survived the Sarlacc Pit he fell into in Return of the Jedi, he makes his return in a silent cameo in "Chapter 9: The Marshal". He reappears in "Chapter 14: The Tragedy", where he is revealed to have saved Fennec Shand on Tatooine after the events of "Chapter 5: The Gunslinger". Initially demanding Din to return his armor which the latter had acquired from Cobb Vanth, he and Fennec later aid Din in battling Gideon's forces as he regains his armor in the process. When the Dark Troopers make off with Grogu and the Razor Crest is destroyed, Fett and Fennec swear to help the Mandalorian rescue Grogu as repayment to Din for returning his armor.

Fett is played by Temuera Morrison, who previously portrayed Boba's father Jango Fett (of whom Boba is a biological clone) in Star Wars: Episode II – Attack of the Clones and voiced Boba in the 2004 DVD releases of The Empire Strikes Back and Return of the Jedi.

==== Frog Lady ====
The "Frog Lady" is a female frog-like creature who appears in "Chapter 10: The Passenger" and "Chapter 11: The Heiress". She enlists the Mandalorian to take her and her eggs to the moon Trask to be reunited with her husband, who can fertilize the eggs, in exchange for information on other Mandalorians' whereabouts. She doesn't speak Galactic Basic, but briefly uses the damaged droid Q9-0's vocabulator to communicate with the Mandalorian. Because of the eggs' fragility, they have to travel at "sub-light", and end up crashing on an icy planet to avoid a X-wing fighter patrol who have an arrest warrant for the Mandalorian since he has helped break out Qin from the New Republic transport. They are nearly killed by a swarm of spider-like Krynka, but are rescued by the X-Wing pilots who let the Mandalorian go with a warning because he assisted in the capture of the others involved in the prison break. After completing repairs, they manage to continue their journey to Trask.

The Frog Lady reunites with her mate the Frog Man upon their arrival on Trask. The Mandalorian leaves the Child with the Frog Lady and the Frog Man to babysit. Following the mission with Bo-Katan, the Mandalorian returns where he finds the Child interacting with the hatchlings.

The Frog Lady is performed by Misty Rosas and her vocal effects are provided by Dee Bradley Baker.

The Frog Lady was positively received by fans.

==== Koska Reeves ====
Reeves is a Mandalorian warrior who appears in "Chapter 11: The Heiress" and "Chapter 16: The Rescue". Reeves is part of the Nite Owls and fights alongside Bo-Katan.

She returned in "Chapter 22: Guns for Hire", as part of Axe Woves' band of mercenary privateers and watched as Bo-Katan fought Woves for the leadership of the group.

Reeves is portrayed by Mercedes Varnado, a professional wrestler better known by the ring names Sasha Banks and Mercedes Moné.

== Featured guest characters ==
Several characters have been featured in a single episode within a season of The Mandalorian in which they play a significant role.

=== Introduced in season one ===
==== Mythrol ====
An unnamed Mythrol appears in the opening scenes of the series premiere "Chapter 1: The Mandalorian", in which the Mandalorian captures him to collect a bounty. He re-appears in "Chapter 12: The Siege". Blue-skinned and amphibious, with fins on his face, the Mythrol is ultimately delivered to the Bounty Hunters' Guild.

The Mythrol returned in the second season episode "Chapter 12: The Siege", where he was released from his carbonite prison to work as a bookkeeper in exchange for a reduced sentence. He also mentioned that he's still suffering from the side effect of the carbonite where he hasn't regained vision in his left eye yet. The Mythrol was brought along with the Mandalorian, Karga, and Cara Dune during their raid on an Imperial base, where he does things when either threatened to be put back in carbonite or to have his sentence cut in half. He was the one who found the message from Dr. Pershing to Moff Gideon about the experiments involving the Child's DNA.

The Mythrol is portrayed by comedian Horatio Sanz, a longtime fan of Star Wars.

==== Toro Calican ====
Toro Calican is a young bounty hunter who encountered the Mandalorian in episode "Chapter 5: The Gunslinger". He recruits the Mandalorian's help capturing the assassin Fennec Shand. It is Toro's first bounty hunting assignment, and he hopes it will help him get into the Bounty Hunters' Guild. Toro later double-crosses the Mandalorian and attempts to turn him over to the Guild, but is instead shot and killed by the Mandalorian.

Toro Calican is portrayed by Jake Cannavale. The character received mixed reviews from critics. (Note: Toro Calican made Vulture's list of the show's 15 best cameo appearances from season one. Vulture writer Jackson McHenry complimented Cannavale, but said the character was "not the most glamorous part". Germain Lussier of Gizmodo called the introduction of a character at the start of his bounty hunting career a "very intriguing twist". Collider writer Vinne Mancuso called Toro a "strange character", but ultimately an inconsequential one since he was killed so quickly. Gregory Lawrence, also of Collider, describing him as a "romcom villainous douche". Tyler Hersko of IndieWire called Toro a "petulant" character less appealing than other antagonists on The Mandalorian. Screen Rant writer Jessie Atkin called Toro a "poor caricature" with "annoying" dialogue, and criticized the show for recycling old ideas like him instead of exploring new territory. Atkin wrote: "Toro Calican was obviously supposed to be a lame knock off of Han Solo, haha, we get the joke, but boy is it one fans don't need to see again.")

==== Ranzar Malk ====
Ranzar "Ran" Malk is the leader of a group of mercenaries that operate out of a space station in "Chapter 6: The Prisoner". He develops a plan for his crew to infiltrate a New Republic prison ship and rescue Qin, an imprisoned Twi'lek. After the mission, Ran tries to have the Mandalorian killed, but instead his space station is attacked by New Republic X-wing fighters, which were led there by the Mandalorian.

Ran is portrayed by Mark Boone Junior. Fans reacted positively to Ran's character and Boone's performance, and the character was included on Vulture's list of the show's 15 best cameo appearances from season one.

==== Migs Mayfeld ====
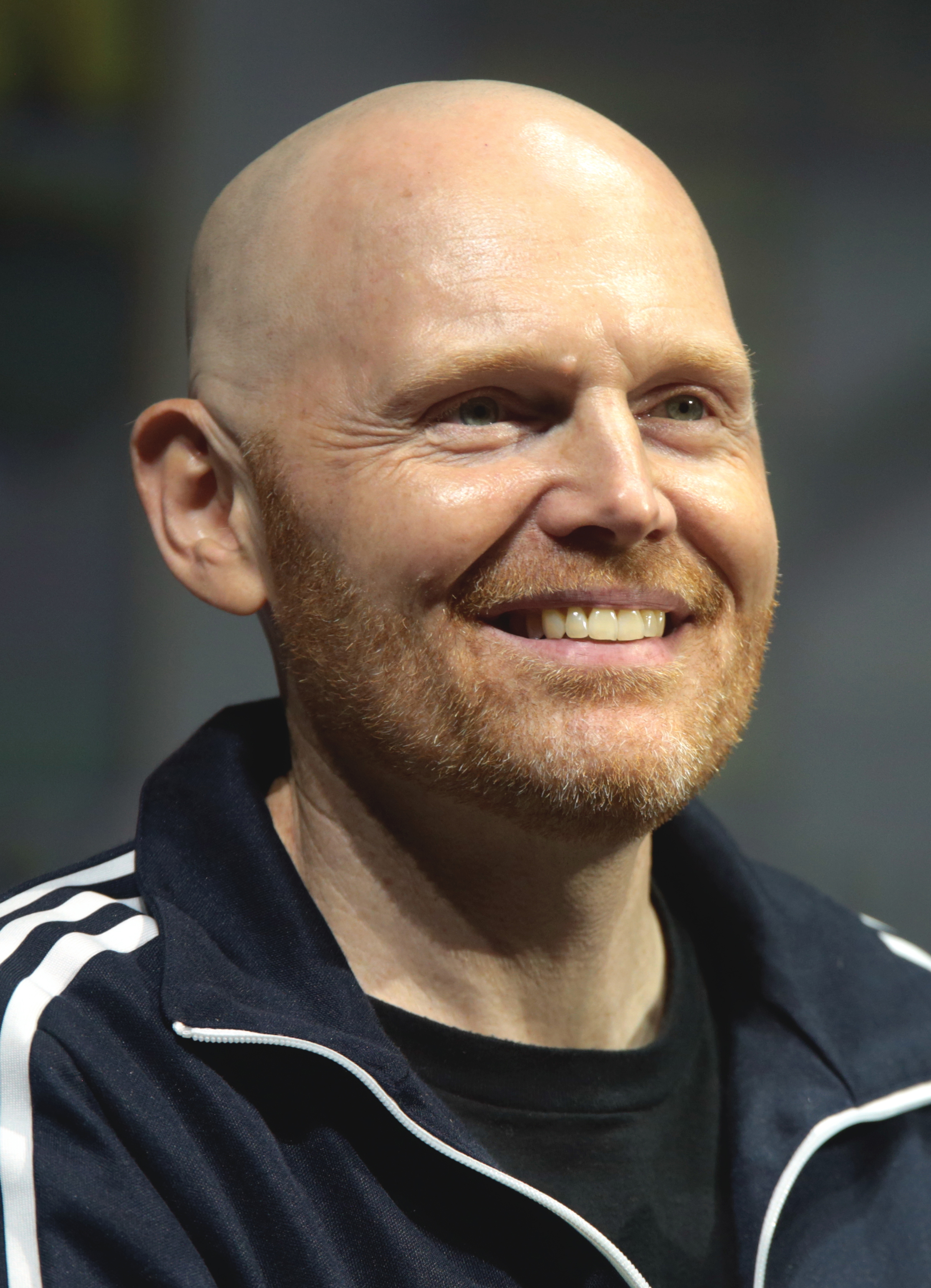
Comedian Bill Burr, who was not a fan of Star Wars and had previously mocked the franchise, portrayed Mayfeld.

Migs Mayfeld is a former Imperial Army sharpshooter who leads a crew of Ranzar "Ran" Malk's mercenaries in their attempt to rescue Qin from a New Republic prison transport ship. He uses two blaster pistols, as well as a third blaster controlled by a droid arm attached to his backpack. Mayfeld clashes repeatedly with the Mandalorian during the mission, and ultimately attempts to betray him, but instead the Mandalorian incapacitates Mayfeld and locks him in a cell on the transport.

After Dark Troopers make off with Grogu, the Mandalorian later asks Cara Dune about where Mayfeld is being held. She finds information stating that Mayfeld was sentenced to 50 years on the Karthon Chop Fields. Dune has him put on work release so that they can get to an Imperial console on Morak. Mayfeld and a disguised Mandalorian make it to the Imperial Rhydonium refinery after fighting off some pirates. The terminal Mayfeld needs is in the officer's mess hall, but Mayfeld sees his former commanding officer Valin Hess and fears being recognized. The Mandalorian goes instead but the terminal requires a facial scan, and he removes his helmet to acquire the codes. He is confronted by Hess, but Mayfeld intervenes. After a tense drink where Hess insults dead soldiers from Operation: Cinder (Note: Operation: Cinder was an Imperial protocol, most prominently featured in Star Wars: Battlefront II, which saw the devastation of several Imperial-controlled planets after the Battle of Endor.) on Burnin Konn, an angered Mayfeld shoots Hess dead. The Mandalorian and Mayfeld fight their way past the stormtroopers and shoretroopers until Boba Fett extracts them. Then Mayfeld blows up the refinery using the Rhydonium supply from their convoy. After getting what they need, Dune and the Mandalorian allow Mayfeld to leave while covering this up by stating that he was killed in action.

Mayfeld is portrayed by actor and comedian Bill Burr, who was not a fan of Star Wars and repeatedly mocked the franchise and its fans before he accepted the role. Jon Favreau offered the part to Burr, believing his past criticism of the franchise would make his casting that much more amusing. Burr was extremely impressed with the filming of The Mandalorian, complimenting the technical aspects of filming as well as the writing style of the series. The character of Mayfeld received a generally positive response from reviewers, and several critics noted that Mayfeld's sardonic personality and hard-edged sense of humor are similar to Burr's real-life comedic style.

==== Xi'an ====
Xi'an is a female purple-skinned Twi'lek who appears in "Chapter 6: The Prisoner". A former love interest of the Mandalorian, she is part of the rescue team sent by Ranzar "Ran" Malk to rescue her brother Qin from a New Republic prison transport. She attempts to betray the Mandalorian during the mission, but instead he incapacitates Xi'an and locks her in a cell on the prison transport.

Xi'an is portrayed by Natalia Tena, the only actress who has appeared in Star Wars, Game of Thrones, and the Harry Potter film series. She is also the second Game of Thrones star to also appear in The Mandalorian, along with Pedro Pascal. Xi'an has received mixed reviews from critics, (Note: Xi'an was ranked tenth on a Screen Rant list of the 10 most interesting characters from the first season of The Mandalorian, and also made Vulture's list of the show's 15 best cameo appearances from season one. Joseph Stanichar of The Post praised Tena's performance and "chaotic energy". Vulture writer Jackson McHenry complimented the character's make-up, and appreciated the character for "bringing out some more humanity" from the Mandalorian. Noah Howell of Niner Times enjoyed Xi'an's chaotic style and called her "another interesting piece to the puzzle" for the Mandalorian, complimenting how she fleshes out the protagonist's backstory. Thrillist writer Dave Gonzales said Tena did a great job portraying Xi'an, praising the small touches she gave the character. Elite Daily writer Ani Bundel felt the character was worthy of her own spin-off series. Dan Brooks, a writer with The Mandalorian production company Lucasfilm, complimented the character and said he hoped to see more of her in the future. Kevin Pantoja of Screen Rant said Xi'An was too over-the-top at times, but "there's still a lot to like about her". Rolling Stone writer Alan Sepinwall said Xi'an's personality is basically limited to one trait, which is "erratic". Matt Webb Mitovich of TVLine disliked the character, whom he described as "scenery-chewing". Deseret News writer Herb Scribner called the character "boring". IGN writer Joe Skrebels called Xi'an possibly the worst The Mandalorian character to date, describing her as "a mess of sneers, giggles, hisses (inexplicably) and absolutely nothing else". Megan Crouse Den of Geek felt Xi'an and the others in her crew were too "hapless" and did not come across as efficient mercenaries.) and several reviewers compared her to the comic book character Harley Quinn.

==== Burg ====
Burg, a red-skinned Devaronian, is the "muscle" of Ranzar "Ran" Malk's mercenary party sent to rescue Qin from a New Republic prison transport ship in "Chapter 6: The Prisoner". Extremely strong, he repeatedly mocks the Mandalorian during their time together, at one point attempting to forcibly remove his helmet. Burg attempts to betray the Mandalorian during the mission, but the Mandalorian defeats him in a fight, and locks him into a cell on the prison transport.

Burg is portrayed by Clancy Brown, who also voiced the Mandalorian bounty hunter Montross in Star Wars: Bounty Hunter (2002), Savage Opress in Star Wars: The Clone Wars, and Ryder Azadi in both Star Wars Rebels and Ahsoka, the latter being a live-action reprisal. Burg was well received by reviewers, (Note: Alan Sepinwall of Rolling Stone said Brown's performance as Burg "has me wishing for a parallel reality where he got to play Hellboy when he was younger". But he also said Burg is basically limited to one trait, which is "hot-tempered". Kerr Lordygan of TV Fanatic called Brown "the coolest guest star in this episode, and possibly thus far in the series". Likewise, Collider writer Vinnie Mancuso declared Burg his favorite character on The Mandalorian. Noah Howell of Niner Times praised Burg's makeup and Brown's performance, saying he did not recognize the actor until seeing his name in the credits. Joseph Stanichar of The Post praised the energy of Brown, who he said delivered an "expert performance". Popular Mechanics writer Darren Orf called Burg a "great addition" to The Mandalorian. Katie Rife of The A.V. Club called him "overtly villainous", but said he was a "worthy adversary" for the Mandalorian. The Ringer writer Ben Lindbergh called him "a heck of a henchman". Not all reviews were positive. IGN writer Joe Skrebels called him "as one-note as you'd fear from someone described literally only as 'the muscle'." Megan Crouse of Den of Geek wrote that Burg and the other characters in the crew "didn't work for me because I didn't believe in them as mercenaries. They're so hapless.") with several comparing him to the fictional superhero Hellboy.

==== Q9-0 ====
Q9-0, also referred to simply as Zero, is a droid who acts as the pilot, navigator, and hacker for the mercenary crew sent by Ranzar "Ran" Malk to rescue Qin from a New Republic prison transport ship in "Chapter 6: The Prisoner". During the mission, Q9-0 discovers there is a high bounty on the Child, whom he attempts to kill, but the Mandalorian shoots and destroys Q9-0 before he can do so.

In "Chapter 10: The Passenger", it is revealed that the Mandalorian has kept Q9-0's remains on the Razor Crest. At one point, the Frog Lady uses the droid's vocabulator part to better communicate with the Mandalorian so that he can understand what she is saying.

Q9-0 is voiced by Richard Ayoade. The character received generally positive reviews from critics. (Note: Popular Mechanics writer Darren Orf complimented the "deadly game of hide-and-seek" between Q9-0 and the Child and enjoyed the fact that Q9-0 was not used for comedic effect, as droids often are in Star Wars. He called it a "nice change", and compared the character to HK-47, a droid featured in the video game Star Wars: Knights of the Old Republic (2003). Conversely, Craig Elvy of Screen Rant felt Ayoade brought deadpan humor to the character's voice, "adding comedic layers to a relatively brief role". Dustin Pinney of Comic Book Resources said Q9-0 was "impeccably voiced" by Ayoade, and Scott Snowden of Space.com said Ayoade's "unique voice" helped make Q9-0 a "great addition" to the episode. Noah Howell of Niner Times called him a "solid" character. /Film writer Bryan Young called him a "fascinating" character. Mike Reyes of CinemaBlend ranked Q9-0 tenth on a list of the "10 Most Iconic Star Wars droids, though he wrote: "we don't really get too much of a sense of Zero's total personality". Not all reviews were positive. IGN writer Joe Skrebels described Zero as "somehow more robotic than any other droid in the Star Wars universe".) A Funko Pop figurine of Q9-0 has been released.

==== Qin ====
Qin is a male purple-skinned Twi'lek who was being held captive on a New Republic prison transport ship in "Chapter 6: The Prisoner". Qin blamed the Mandalorian for his imprisonment. Ranzar "Ran" Malk arranges for a mercenary party to rescue Qin, which includes the Mandalorian. After the team infiltrates the ship and recovers Qin, they lock the Mandalorian in Qin's cell and attempt to abandon him there, but he escapes. The Mandalorian returns Qin to Ran's space station, but also leads the New Republic to their location, and the station is attacked by X-wing fighters while Qin is aboard.

Qin is portrayed by Ismael Cruz Córdova. The character received mixed reviews from critics. (Note: Thrillist writer Dave Gonzales said Córdova did a great job portraying Qin, and "manage(d) to not make the head tenticles [sic] look too stupid". Noah Howell of Niner Times called Qin a "solid" character, while Dan Brooks, a writer with The Mandalorian production company Lucasfilm, complimented the character and said he hoped to see more of him in the future. Rolling Stone critic Alan Sepinwall called Qin the least interesting character from the mercenary crew, comparing his performance to "a poor man's Joker impression".)

=== Introduced in season two ===
==== Gor Koresh ====
Gor Koresh is an Abyssin gangster whom the Mandalorian sought out for information on any Mandalorian sightings in "Chapter 9: The Marshal". When the Mandalorian approaches him while he is watching a ring fight, Koresh orders his henchmen to kill him and steal his beskar armor, but the Mandalorian defeats them and interrogates Koresh, who informs them of a Mandalorian warrior operating on Tatooine. The Mandalorian then leaves Koresh hanging from the lamppost where he shoots the lights out as nocturnal creatures start to close in.

Gor Koresh is performed by John Rosengrant and voiced by John Leguizamo.

==== Cobb Vanth ====
Cobb Vanth is the marshal of the Tatooine town of Mos Pelgo. On the day when the second Death Star was destroyed, Cobb was present when the Mining Collective attacked Mos Pelgo. Although he was forced to work as a slave, he eventually escaped with a box that, unbeknownst to him, contained crystals, which he traded to his Jawa rescuers in exchange for the salvaged Mandalorian armor formerly owned by Boba Fett. Using the armor, Cobb drove off the invaders, and continued to protect the townspeople of Mos Pelgo ever since.

In "Chapter 9: The Marshal", the Mandalorian is told to seek out Cobb by people who had mistaken him for an actual Mandalorian because of his armor. When the Mandalorian meets Cobb and finds out the truth, he demands that Cobb remove his armor. Their stand-off is interrupted by the attack of a Krayt dragon that has been terrorizing Mos Pelgo, and Cobb persuades the Mandalorian to assist him in killing it in exchange for the armor. Together, they form an unlikely alliance between the townspeople and the Tusken Raiders to eliminate their common enemy, before the Mandalorian comes up with a strategy to use a Bantha as a suicide bomber and have it detonate once the dragon eats it. When the plan fails, the Mandalorian decides to allow himself to be eaten as well in order to manually detonate the explosives, and entrusts Cobb to look after the Child, should he perish. The Mandalorian survives and, with the dragon slain, he parts ways amicably with Cobb, who hands him his armor.

Cobb Vanth is portrayed by Timothy Olyphant. The character was introduced in the Star Wars: Aftermath trilogy of novels written by Chuck Wendig.

==== Axe Woves ====
Axe Woves is a Mandalorian warrior who appears in "Chapter 11: The Heiress".

In season three, Woves leads the Mandalorians with him as mercenaries where they are first seen having to return a Mon Calamari Nobleman who fled with the Quarran Captain Shuggoth to his father, who is a Mon Calamari Viceroy. Then they docked at Plazir-15 to help its inhabitants. Bo-Katan defeated him in combat, where Djarin gave her the Darksaber for having defeated the cyborg that defeated him on Mandalore. Woves and those with him agree to aid Bo-Katan in the plans to take back Mandalore.

Axe is portrayed by Simon Kassianides. The character was named by George Lucas, who visited the set during the shooting of Chapter 11.

==== Imperial Captain ====
The unnamed Imperial Captain appears in "Chapter 11: The Heiress" as the captain of an Imperial cargo ship that contained stolen Mandalorian weapons. The Mandalorian helped Bo-Katan Kryze's group in reclaiming it. The captain informed Moff Gideon about the situation and called for backup, only to be told by Gideon to sacrifice the ship as they are beyond rescue right now. After Bo-Katan's group makes their way into the bridge and stops the ship from crashing, Bo-Katan demands the Captain tell her the location of the Darksaber. He fears Gideon more than her and commits suicide by biting on an electric capsule.

The unnamed Imperial Captain is portrayed by Titus Welliver.

==== Elia Kane ====
Elia Kane is a former Imperial communications officer who served under Gideon. She is presumed dead after the season 2 finale when Din Djarin and his allies raid Gideon's cruiser to rescue Grogu.

In season 3, Kane is revealed to have survived the attack and apparently joins the New Republic. Serving undercover as a participant in an amnesty program, she befriends Dr. Pershing and helps him find a way to surreptitiously continue his cloning research. However, she betrays him to the New Republic and secretly sabotages his mind-wipe, making it significantly worse. Kane would later offer her opinion on Nevarro to Colonel Tuttle when it comes under attack by Gorian Shard's pirate crew; Kane later informs a fugitive Gideon that the pirates had been defeated by Bo-Katan Kryze and Din Djarin's force of Mandalorians, and that Bo-Katan intends to return to Mandalore and retake it.

Kane is portrayed by Katy M. O'Brian.

==== Lang ====
Lang is an Imperial Lieutenant who works for Morgan Elsbeth on the planet Corvus. He assisted her in oppressing the citizens of Calodan while leading the fight against Ahsoka Tano. When the Mandalorian arrived in Calodan, Lang took him to Morgan. Lang later led his troops into fighting Ahsoka and the Mandalorian when they attacked Calodan and took down the soldiers loyal to Morgan. As Ahsoka dueled with Morgan, Lang was in a stand-off with the Mandalorian. When Morgan was defeated, Lang put down his weapons and tried to fake surrender by pulling out a smaller blaster, only to be shot by the Mandalorian.

Lang is portrayed by Michael Biehn.

==== Ahsoka Tano ====
Ahsoka Tano is a Togruta, former Jedi Padawan to Anakin Skywalker, and whom the Mandalorian seeks out in order to return the Child to his species. When on Corvus, she attacked Calodan in order for Morgan Elsbeth to divulge to her the location of her master. The Mandalorian met Ahsoka Tano, and she was able to interact with The Child without words as they can feel each other's thoughts. Ahsoka then reveals that Grogu is the Child's name. She mentions that Grogu is only the second living being of his species that Ahsoka has encountered, the first being Master Yoda. After testing one of Grogu's abilities, Ahsoka didn't want to train him due to the bad path he might take. The Mandalorian and Ahsoka work together to liberate Calodan from Elsbeth who is defeated by Ahsoka. She gives the unseen answer to Ahsoka on where her master Grand Admiral Thrawn is. Before the Mandalorian and Grogu take their leave, Ahsoka directs them to Tython, where there are the ruins of an old temple. If his calls are answered by another Jedi, he will be trained by that Jedi.

Ahsoka is portrayed by Rosario Dawson in "Chapter 13: The Jedi". The character was previously voiced by Ashley Eckstein in Star Wars: The Clone Wars, Star Wars Rebels, and Star Wars: The Rise of Skywalker.

==== Morgan Elsbeth ====
Morgan Elsbeth is a Nightsister and the Imperial Magistrate of Calodan on the planet Corvus.

In her early life, her people were massacred by General Grievous during the Clone Wars. During the rise of the Galactic Empire, Morgan helped to build the Imperial Fleet and has worked for Grand Admiral Thrawn, and she pillaged different worlds. Among her works during her service to the Empire included drafting the designs of the TIE Defender, which was rejected for years due to their high cost of manufacture, but Thrawn took interest in the project and produced the starfighter on Lothal.

She ruled Calodan with an iron fist and strung up her prisoners in electrical cages. Ahsoka Tano did different attacks on Calodan in order to get Morgan to divulge the location of Thrawn. When the Mandalorian arrived on Corvus, Morgan contracted him to find Ahsoka, for which she would give him a pure beskar staff as reward. The Mandalorian and Ahsoka worked together to liberate Calodan from Morgan's rule. Following Morgan's overthrow, a man named Wing became the governor of Calodan.

Morgan Elsbeth is portrayed by Diana Lee Inosanto.

==== Luke Skywalker ====
Luke Skywalker is the Jedi Master who responds to Grogu's transmission through the Force, rescuing him from Gideon's Dark Troopers in "Chapter 16: The Rescue". Alongside R2-D2, he subsequently agrees to train Grogu as a Jedi Padawan.

Luke is portrayed by Mark Hamill, who was digitally de-aged to portray a younger Luke Skywalker. Max Lloyd-Jones served as an on-set body double for the character.

=== Introduced in season three ===
==== Kelleran Beq ====
Kelleran Beq is the Jedi Master that rescued Grogu from the Jedi Temple on Coruscant during the events of Order 66.

Beq is played by Ahmed Best, reprising his role from Star Wars: Jedi Temple Challenge. This is Best's third performance in the Star Wars universe, his most notable being Jar Jar Binks in all three prequel films, and a background character in Attack of the Clones.

==== Colonel Tuttle ====
Colonel Tuttle is a New Republic requisitions officer. Carson Teva informs him about Gorian Shard's attack on Nevarro. He is unable to arrange for aid to be provided since it is not in the New Republic's jurisdiction.

Tuttle is portrayed by Tim Meadows.

==== Captain Bombardier ====
Captain Bombardier is a former member of the Imperial army who went through the Republic's amnesty program where he arrived on Plazir-15. He helped to improve Plazir-15's lifestyle and married the Duchess of Plazir-15.

Bombardier is portrayed by Jack Black.

==== Duchess of Plazir-15 ====
The unnamed Duchess of Plazir-15 is the ruler of Plazir-15 and the wife of Captain Bombardier.

The Duchess of Plazir-15 is portrayed by Lizzo.

==== Commander Helgait ====
Commander Helgait is Plazir-15's elderly head of security who is a remnant of the Separatists. His family had served in the Duchess of Plazir-15's family for years.

Commander Helgait is portrayed by Christopher Lloyd.

== Minor guest characters ==
Several characters have appeared on The Mandalorian in minor roles or significant cameo appearances.

=== Introduced in season one ===
==== Omera ====
Omera is a krill farmer and widow living on a village on Sorgan with her daughter, Winta, in the episode "Chapter 4: Sanctuary". When the villagers hire the Mandalorian and Cara Dune to protect them from Klatooinian raiders, Omera befriends the Mandalorian, and the two appear attracted to each other. She participates in the village's successful defense of the village and elimination of the raiders.

Omera is portrayed by Julia Jones. "Chapter 4" director Bryce Dallas Howard said it was challenging directing emotional scenes between Omera and the Mandalorian because he always wears a helmet, but that the scenes worked because "Julia is deeply connected to her emotions and you can just feel them on her face." Brendan Wayne, a body double for the Mandalorian character, said his scenes with Jones were so emotional that they made him cry. The character of Omera has received mixed reviews from critics. (Note: Bryan Young of /Film said Omera "steals every scene she's in" and had such excellent chemistry with the Mandalorian that it "truly hurts" when he cannot stay with her at the end of the episode. Forbes writer Erik Kane described Omera as a "great new female character introduced into a show that's been mostly men", and said he wanted to learn more about the character. Vulture writer Liz Shannon Miller said Omera is a familiar archetype, but she appreciated that the character took a leadership role in the village and during the fighting scenes, and that she was not reduced to a background role due to her gender. Not all reviews were positive. Kathryn VanArendonk, also of Vulture, wrote that Omera had "zero characterization except that she is a good, protective mother". Anthony Gramuglia of Comic Book Resources wrote that some fans criticized Omera and the presence of other strong women in The Mandalorain because they felt it was "forced diversity". Gramuglia said these objections were misogynist and "patently ridiculous".)

==== Winta ====
Winta is the young daughter of Omera, living in a village on Sorgan in "Chapter 4: Sanctuary". She develops a close friendship with the Child after the Mandalorian brings him to the village.

Winta is portrayed by Isla Farris.

==== Caben and Stoke ====
Caben and Stoke are krill farmers in a Sorgan village in "Chapter 4: Sanctuary". The two hire the Mandalorian to provide protection from Klatooinian raiders attacking the village.

Caben is portrayed by actor and comedian Asif Ali, and Stoke is played by actor and comedian Eugene Cordero. The two were included on Vulture's list of the show's 15 best cameo appearances from season one, in which writer Jackson McHenry described them as "a delightful pair of goofy villagers".

==== Riot Mar ====
Riot Mar is a bounty hunter who attempts to recover the Child from the Mandalorian in "Chapter 5: The Gunslinger". Riot pilots a starfighter and attacks the Mandalorian's ship, but is killed by the Mandalorian after a brief dogfight.

Riot Mar is portrayed by Rio Hackford.

==== Lant Davan ====
Lant Davan is a soldier with the New Republic and the sole non-droid crew member of a New Republic prison transport ship in "Chapter 6: The Prisoner". Despite efforts by the Mandalorian to save him, Lant Davan is murdered by a gang of mercenaries who board the ship to rescue the prisoner Qin.

Lant Davan is portrayed by Matt Lanter, who also provides the voice of Star Wars protagonist Anakin Skywalker in Star Wars: The Clone Wars, as well as other minor characters. Syfy Wire writer Bryan Young noted that Lanter's performance as Davan sounds nothing like his voice for Anakin, which Young said "speaks to his skill as an actor".

==== Trapper Wolf, Jib Dodger, and Sash Ketter ====
Trapper Wolf, Jib Dodger, and Sash Ketter are a trio of New Republic X-wing starfighter pilots, who investigate a homing beacon activated from a New Republic prison transport ship in "Chapter 6: The Prisoner". The pilots follow the beacon to a space station operated by mercenary Ranzar "Ran" Malk, which they attack.

In "Chapter 10: The Passenger", Trapper Wolf accompanied Carson Teva in investigating the Razor Crest. The three pilots later appear at the bar in Adelphi Squadron headquarters in "Chapter 21: The Pirate".

Each of the three pilots are played by directors of first season episodes making cameo appearances: Jib is portrayed by Rick Famuyiwa, Sash is played by Deborah Chow, and Trapper is portrayed by Dave Filoni. Famuyiwa directed and co-wrote the episode in which he appeared. Trapper Wolf's name was inspired by Filoni's love of wolves.

=== Introduced in season two ===
==== Carson Teva ====
Carson Teva is a law enforcement captain within the Adelphi Rangers of the New Republic's Starfighter Corps who originated from Alderaan. He first appeared in "Chapter 10: The Passenger", where he and Trapper Wolf follow the Razor Crest wanting a ping from it upon entering an area of space that is under the New Republic's jurisdiction and wanting to ask about the New Republic Correctional Transport incident, which led to the Mandalorian flying to Maldo Kreis. Teva and Wolf catch up to the Mandalorian, where they slew some ice spiders. After noting that he was sighted with some criminals during a breakout and that he left the same criminals in a cell, they were able to overlook it. Before leaving, Carson advises that the Mandalorian gets his transponder fixed by the next time they run into each other.

In "Chapter 12: The Siege", Carson Teva and one of his fellow New Republic Starfighter Corps members visited Nevarro where he asked Greef Karga about the destruction of an Imperial base there. After Karga confirmed some information, Teva later spoke to Cara Dune, where he states that the New Republic is not sure what is happening in the Outer Rim and they won't be able to get to the bottom of it without local support. It is also revealed that they suffered mutual losses of people they knew the day Alderaan was destroyed.

In season three, Carson Teva received a distress signal from Greef Karga and had a brief discussion with Garazeb Orrelios. As he was unable to get Colonel Tuttle to send aid to Nevarro, Teva traced R5-D4's signal to where the Armorer's Mandalorian group was and enlists Djarin for help, which led to the Mandalorians aiding in the fight against Gorian Shard. He would later find the prison transport containing Moff Gideon adrift as Gideon's body was nowhere to be found. Djarin later visited Teva at the bar that he frequents. He offers to do contract work for him when it comes to rounding up the remnants of the Galactic Empire. Teva reluctantly agrees. When Grogu sees the head of a droid similar to IG-11 as one of the trophies, Djarin was able to get Teva to procure some parts that were used to rebuild IG-11.

Carson Teva is portrayed by Paul Sun-Hyung Lee.

==== Governor Wing ====
Governor Wing is a human who lives in Calodan on the planet Corvus at the time when its people were oppressed by Magistrate Morgan Elsbeth. While the Mandalorian and Ahsoka Tano were fighting Morgan's forces, Wing helped to free the prisoners. When Morgan is defeated by Ahsoka and overthrown, Wing becomes the governor of Calodan.

Governor Wing is portrayed by Wing Tao Chao, a Disney executive who retired in 2009.

==== Valin Hess ====
Valin Hess is an Imperial officer who used to have Migs Mayfeld as a soldier and participated in Operation: Cinder. A disguised Mandalorian and Mayfeld encounter him at a Rhydonium refinery on Morak. The terminal Mayfeld needs is in the officer's mess hall, but Mayfeld sees his former commanding officer Valin Hess and fears being recognized. The Mandalorian goes instead, but the terminal requires a facial scan and he removes his helmet to acquire the codes. He is confronted by Hess, but Mayfeld intervenes. After a tense drink where Hess insults dead soldiers from Operation: Cinder, an angered Mayfeld shoots Hess dead.

Valin Hess is portrayed by Richard Brake.

==== R2-D2 ====
R2-D2 is a droid that was befriended by Luke Skywalker. He appeared with Luke in "Chapter 16: The Rescue", where they obtain Grogu so that Luke can train him.

==== Bib Fortuna ====
Bib Fortuna is the former aide of Jabba the Hutt. He appears in the post-credits scene of "Chapter 16: The Rescue", where he is revealed to have taken over Jabba's palace, and is subsequently killed by his former ally Boba Fett.

Bib Fortuna is portrayed by Matthew Wood; he previously appeared as the character in Star Wars: The Phantom Menace.

=== Introduced in season three ===
==== Ragnar Vizsla ====
Ragnar is the son of Paz Vizsla and a Mandalorian initiate who was in the midst of being sworn in by the Armorer as part of a coming of age ritual. It was disrupted when a Dinosaur Turtle emerged from the lake as the Armorer gets Ragnar out of the way. After being bested by Grogu in a match with training darts, Ragnar was abducted by a Shriek-hawk causing Bo-Katan to lead Djarin, Paz, and some other Mandalorians in rescuing him.

Ragnar is portrayed by Wesley Kimmel.

==== Nevarro Copper Droid ====
The Nevarro Copper Droid is a Droid that serves as an advisor to Greef Karga.

The Nevarro Copper Droid is performed by Chris Bartlett and voiced by Parvesh Cheena.

==== Gorian Shard ====
Gorian Shard is the captain of a group of pirates who operated in the sector where Nevarro is. He later launched an attack on Nevarro which caused the citizens to flee the city. As Carson Teva was unable to get Colonel Tuttle to send aid to Nevarro due to various reasons, Teva enlisted Djarin and the Armorer's faction for help. While most of the Mandalorians engaged the pirates on the ground, Djarin and Bo-Katan attacked Shard's ship. After the final engine was shot, Shard called a fleeing Vane a coward as he and those on board with him perished in the crash. The remainder of Shard's pirates that were on the ground were detained.

Gorian Shard is performed by Carey Jones and voiced by Nonso Anozie.

==== Vane ====
Vane is a member of Gorian Shard's pirate crew. Vane later accompanied Shard during an attack on Nevarro. He would later flee after his fellow fighters are shot down causing Shard to call him a coward.

Vane is portrayed by Marti Matulis.

==== Coxswain ====
The Coxswain is an unnamed Ugnaught member of Gorian Shard's pirate crew who helps to operate his spaceship. During Gorian Shard's attack on Nevarro, the Coxswain forwarded Shard's orders to Vane and those attacking from the air. He perished when Shard's ship crashed to the ground.

The Coxswain is performed by Misty Rosas and voiced by Mat Fraser.

==== R5-D4 ====
R5-D4 is a malfunctioning astromech that was supposed to be sold to Owen Lars back in Star Wars before sabotaging his own systems, causing him to be rejected in favor of R2-D2. Years later, he appears in Pelli Moto's custody after getting him from the Jawas. Due to Moto not having a part associated with IG-11, she sold R5-D4 to the Mandalorian in order to explore the surface of Mandalore and to see if its atmosphere is toxic. Carson Teva later traced R5-D4's signal to the Armorer's Mandalorian group where he persuades them to help save Nevarro from Gorian Shard's pirate crew.

==== Garazeb "Zeb" Orrelios ====
Garazeb "Zeb" Orrelios is the former Captain of the Lasat high honor guard who joined the Rebellion after the near-extinction of his people by the Empire. He was seen interacting with Carson Teva after he got a distress call from Greef Karga.

Zeb is voiced by Steve Blum, who reprises his role from the animated series Star Wars Rebels.

==== Lieutenant Reed ====
Lieutenant Reed is a New Republic pilot, working with Carson Teva. He was seen with Carson Teva while they were investigating the ruins of Moff Gideon's prison shuttle.

Reed is portrayed by Max Lloyd-Jones, who reprises his role from The Book of Boba Fett.

==== Shuggoth ====
Shuggoth is the captain of a Quarren spaceship. Axe Woves showed up in his ship to get back the Mon Calamari Nobleman who fled with her. When those who boarded the ship come for the Mon Calamari Nobleman, she persuaded him to go with them and that they will meet again someday.

Shuggoth is performed by Joanna Bennett and voiced by Christine Adams.

==== Mon Calamari Nobleman ====
The unnamed Mon Calamari Nobleman is the son of an unnamed Mon Calamari Viceroy who fled with the Quarren Captain Shuggoth that he was romantically involved with while skipping bail in the process. When Axes Woves and those with him came for the Mon Calamari Nobleman with plans to return him to his father, the Mon Calamari Nobleman was persuaded by Shuggoth to go with them and that they will meet again someday.

The Mon Calamari Nobleman is performed by David St. Pierre and voiced by Harry Holland.

==== Shadow Council ====
The Shadow Council are a group of Imperial warlords who are among the remnants of the Galactic Empire. Moff Gideon is associated with this group as they plan to make the Galactic Empire rise again.

The unnamed warlords are portrayed by Ron Bottitta, Imelda Corcoran, Jonny Coyne, Marco Khan, Jodi Long, and Hemky Madera.

==== Gilad Pellaeon ====
Gilad Pellaeon is an Imperial officer who is part of the Shadow Council, together with Moff Gideon and other high-ranking Imperials. Pellaeon is an advocate of Grand Admiral Thrawn, with whom he has worked before, as Gideon once asked Pellaeon on why Thrawn is not present during their meeting.

Gilad Pellaeon is portrayed by Xander Berkeley. The character previously appeared in the series finale of Star Wars Rebels where he was voiced by Jim Cummings. Pellaeon first appeared in Timothy Zahn's Thrawn trilogy, before being re-introduced into canon works.

==== Brendol Hux ====
Brendol Hux is an Imperial officer who is part of the Shadow Council that composes of high-ranking Imperials not caught by the New Republic. He has a son named Armitage who later becomes general in the First Order and Commander of Starkiller Base, only ranking below Supreme Leader Snoke.

Brendol Hux is portrayed by Brian Gleeson, the brother of Domhnall Gleeson who portrayed his son in the sequel trilogy. Hux first appeared in the Aftermath trilogy written by Chuck Wendig.

== See also ==
- List of The Book of Boba Fett characters
- List of Star Wars characters
- Mandalorian
