= Matthew Jensen (cinematographer) =

American cinematographer

- Born: Indiana, U.S.
- Education: University of Southern California
- Occupation: Cinematographer
- Years active: 1995–present
- Organization: American Society of Cinematographers
- Website: matthewjensendp.com

Matthew Jensen is an American cinematographer.

Jensen was born in Indiana and grew up in Northern Virginia. As a child, he took numerous classes at the Smithsonian Institution. He is a graduate of the University of Southern California film program. His past credits include Game of Thrones, Fantastic Four, and Wonder Woman. In 2013, he became a member of the American Society of Cinematographers. Variety listed him as one of the "10 Cinematographers to Watch in 2017".

In 2021, Jensen won a Primetime Emmy Award in the Outstanding Cinematography for a Single-Camera Series category for the episode "Chapter 15: The Believer" from the series The Mandalorian.

== Filmography ==
=== Short film ===
| Year | Title | Director | Notes |
|---|---|---|---|
| 1997 | Stick Up | Howard Carey | |
| 1997 | Mad' Boy, I'll Blow Your Blues Away. Be Mine | Adam Collis | With Michael A. Price |
| 2001 | Eyeball Eddie | Elizabeth Allen Rosenbaum | |
| 2001 | Rebound Guy | Mark Goffman | |
| 2002 | Morning Breath | Brin Hill | |
| 2002 | The Wedding Dress | Hanelle M. Culpepper | |
| 2002 | The Car Kid | Tricia Brock | |
| 2004 | The Ecology of Love | Brin Hill | |
| 2004 | Child Psychology | Ian McCamey | |

=== Feature film ===
| Year | Title | Director |
|---|---|---|
| 1999 | Man of the Century | Adam Abraham |
| 1999 | Ratas, Ratones, Rateros | Sebastián Cordero |
| 2003 | Devil's Pond | Joel Vietel |
| 2004 | Killer Diller | Tricia Brock |
| 2005 | Checking Out | Jeff Hare |
| 2008 | Ball Don't Lie | Brin Hill |
| 2012 | Chronicle | Josh Trank |
| 2013 | Filth | Jon S. Baird |
| 2015 | Fantastic Four | Josh Trank |
| 2017 | Wonder Woman | Patty Jenkins |
| 2020 | Wonder Woman 1984 | Patty Jenkins |
| 2023 | Poolman | Chris Pine |
| 2024 | Barron's Cove | Evan Ari Kelman |
| 2026 | Thumb | Daina Oniunas-Pusic |

=== Television ===
| Year | Title | Director(s) | Notes |
|---|---|---|---|
| 2005 | Numb3rs | Martha Mitchell; J. Miller Tobin; Paul Holahan; Paris Barclay | 5 episodes |
| 2006 | CSI: Crime Scene Investigation | Terrence O'Hara; Kenneth Fink; Alec Smight; Duane Clark | 4 episodes |
| 2008–2010 | True Blood | | 18 episodes |
| 2011–2013 | Game of Thrones | David Benioff | 4 episodes |
| 2012 | GCB | Alan Poul | Episode "Pilot" |
| 2013 | Ray Donovan | | 11 episodes |
| 2019 | I Am the Night | Patty Jenkins | Episodes "Pilot" and "Phenomenon of Interference" |
| 2020 | The Mandalorian | Bryce Dallas Howard; Carl Weathers; Rick Famuyiwa | "Chapter 11: The Heiress" "Chapter 12: The Siege" "Chapter 15: The Believer" |
| 2022 | Christmas Always Finds Its Way | Alexander Buono | Episode "Christmas Bites" |
| 2023 | Extrapolations | Scott Z. Burns | Episodes "2037: A Raven Story" and "2046: Whale Fall" |
| 2025 | The Boroughs | Ben Taylor | 4 episodes |

=== Video game ===
| Year | Title |
|---|---|
| 1996 | Phantasmagoria: A Puzzle of Flesh |
