= Chapter 11: The Heiress =

- The Mandalorian episode
- Episode no.: Season 2 Episode 3
- Directed by: Bryce Dallas Howard
- Written by: Jon Favreau
- Cinematography by: Matthew Jensen
- Editing by: Dylan Firshein
- Original release date: November 13, 2020
- Running time: 32 minutes

Co-starring
- Misty Rosas as the Frog Lady; Mercedes Varnado as Koska Reeves; Katee Sackhoff as Bo-Katan Kryze; Simon Kassianides as Axe Woves; Titus Welliver as an Imperial Captain; Giancarlo Esposito as Moff Gideon

Episode chronology
← Previous "Chapter 10: The Passenger"	Next → "Chapter 12: The Siege"
- The Mandalorian season 2

"Chapter 11: The Heiress" is the third episode of the second season of the American streaming television series The Mandalorian. It was written by showrunner Jon Favreau and directed by Bryce Dallas Howard. It was released on Disney+ on November 13, 2020. The episode stars Pedro Pascal as the Mandalorian, a lone bounty hunter on the run with "the Child", in search of the latter's people, the Jedi. Katee Sackhoff guest stars as Bo-Katan Kryze, a character she previously voiced on the animated series Star Wars: The Clone Wars and Star Wars Rebels. The episode received positive reviews, with Howard's direction and the live-action introduction of Bo-Katan garnering acclaim.

== Plot ==
The Razor Crest, severely damaged, (Note: As seen in "Chapter 10: The Passenger".) crash lands on the moon of Trask. The Frog Lady is reunited with her husband, who directs The Mandalorian to an inn, where he learns three Mandalorians have been seen, and the captain of a trawler of Quarren offers passage to find the Mandalorians.

Out at sea, the Captain shows them a Mamacore they are transporting. As he suddenly throws the Child's carrier into the beast's cage, the Mandalorian dives in after the Child and is trapped inside the cage. The captain intends to kill him for his armor. Mandalorians come to their rescue, killing the entire crew. The leader (Bo-Katan Kryze) and her teammates (Koska Reeves and Axe Woves) supposedly break a taboo by taking off their helmets. The Mandalorian immediately distrusts them, but she explains her Mandalorian heritage and that he is a Child of the Watch, (Note: The Mandalorians seen saving Mando in his flashback in "Chapter 8: Redemption"—known as the Fighting Corps—bear the Death Watch insignia.) a group consisting of zealots who follow "the (ancient) Way (of the Mandalore)", which mainstream Mandalorian society does not. The Mandalorian leaves, stubbornly refusing Bo-Katan's help.

The Mandalorian is attacked by the brother of the dead trawler captain. Again, Bo-Katan comes to his aid. She later explains that Imperial remnants still plunder Mandalore and her team is raiding cargo ships to steal weapons to retake their homeworld. She promises the information he needs in return for his help in their next raid. The Child stays with the Frog Lady.

The team makes short work of the stormtroopers on board the freighter and takes control of the cargo. Bo-Katan alters the mission, deciding to take the whole ship. She also reveals she seeks a Mandalorian relic that had been stolen from her: the Darksaber. The Mandalorian is reluctant. Bo-Katan mocks him saying, "This is the Way." The Captain alerts Moff Gideon, but it is too late for help. Gideon tells the Captain to sacrifice the ship to kill them all. The Mandalorian makes a dangerous charge at a group of stormtroopers, allowing the rest of the group to take control of the ship in time. She presses the Captain to tell her the location of the Darksaber, but he tells her she must already know and takes himself out via suicide shocker.

Bo-Katan thanks the Mandalorian and invites him to join them in future missions, saying his bravery will be remembered. He declines, saying he must continue his quest. While stating that the offer still stands, Bo-Katan directs him to the city of Calodan on the forest planet of Corvus, where he will find a Jedi called Ahsoka Tano.

== Production ==
=== Development ===
The episode was written by series creator Jon Favreau and directed by Bryce Dallas Howard. The character Bo-Katan Kryze was created by Dave Filoni and first appeared in 2011 in the animated series The Clone Wars. Sackhoff found it challenging bringing Kryze to life. She wanted to make the character feel familiar but bigger and better than before. She said the experience felt as if she were the animated character Roger Rabbit exploring the real world. Sackhoff thought of Bo-Katan as regal and stoic and did not want her face to be too expressive, but also did not want her performance to be too stiff and wooden. Howard humorously compared her to Pinocchio and encouraged Sackhoff by saying "more real boy". There were extensive discussions about what the hair would look like. It needed to be realistic but also familiar. Since she was working on a series for Netflix, Sackhoff could not dye her hair and had to use a wig.

The atmospheric re-entry sequence was an homage to Apollo 13 directed by Ron Howard. The harbor crane is a modified AT-AT.

Costume Designer Shawna Trpcic commissioned sculptor Jose Fernandez and his Ironhead Studios to build Mandalorian armor for Bo-Katan and Koska. Koska Reeves distinctive cross braid hairstyle was created by stylist Maria Sandoval.

=== Casting ===
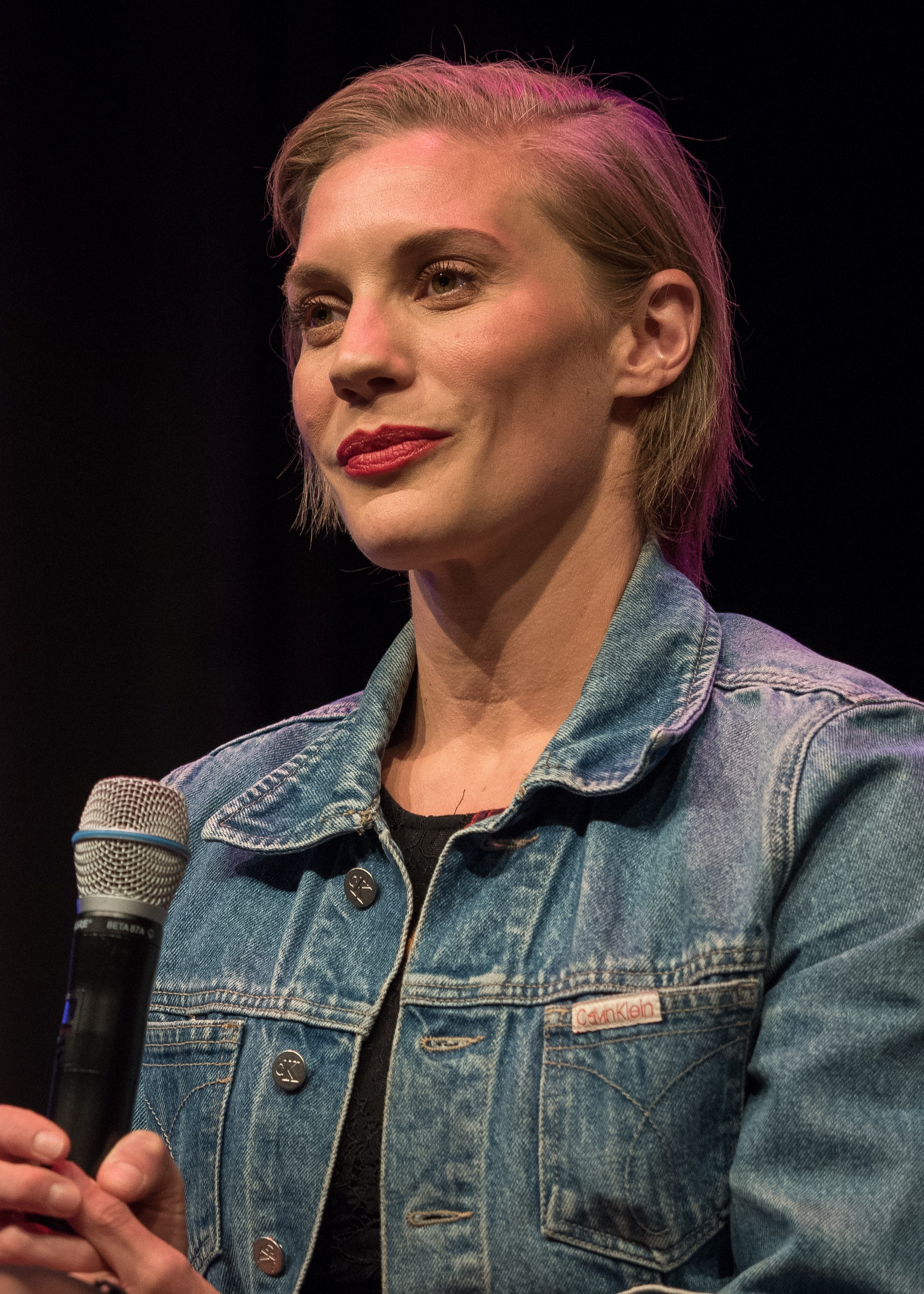
Katee Sackhoff appears as Bo-Katan Kryze.

On May 12, 2020, it was announced that Katee Sackhoff had joined the cast of The Mandalorian, and that she would be portraying Bo-Katan Kryze, a role she had previously voiced on the animated television series Star Wars: The Clone Wars and Star Wars Rebels. Other co-starring actors cast for this episode are Misty Rosas returning as the Frog Lady, Mercedes Varnado as Koska Reeves, Simon Kassianides as Axe Woves, Titus Welliver as an Imperial Captain, and Giancarlo Esposito returning as Moff Gideon. Additional guest starring actors cast for this episode include John Cameron as the Frog Man, Norwood Cheek as a Mon Calamari server, Kevin Dorff as a deck officer, Alexander Wraith as a freighter pilot, and Philip Alexander as a security officer. Lateef Crowder, Barry Lowin and Brendan Wayne are credited as stunt doubles for the Mandalorian. Caitlin Dechelle, Lauren Kim and Caitlin Hutson, Kofi Yiadom, and Con Schell are credited as stunt doubles for Bo-Katan Kryze, Koska Reeves, Axe Woves, and the Imperial Captain, respectively. "The Child" was performed by various puppeteers.

Jon Favreau saw Mercedes Varnado in an episode of Hot Ones, and a casting agent reached out to her through Instagram. Varnado welcomed the opportunity but was worried about making it work with her WWE travel schedule, and also nervous about her first time doing this kind of acting. Favreau, Filoni, and Howard supported her and answered any questions she had. Favreau reassured her "you do WWE every single week and you do that live. You are amazing. There's a reason why I wanted you to be a part of the show."

Actress Janina Gavankar, who previously voiced and performed motion capture for the game Star Wars Battlefront II, assisted Frank Ippolito in the puppetry performance of a Mon Calamari dock worker.

=== Music ===
Ludwig Göransson composed the musical score for the episode. The featured tracks were released on November 20, 2020, in the first volume of the season two soundtrack.

Göransson wanted Bo-Katan's theme to be extremely energetic, because it "shows up with such speed and energy" and gave her what he called an industrial heavily produced techno sound. He explains "With a lot of the show it's using all these different musical genres and combining them all through production techniques" and "With Bo-Katan it's a heavily distorted synthesizer sound running through a gate pattern effect."

== Reception ==
On Rotten Tomatoes, the episode received an approval rating of 98% based on reviews from 50 critics, with an average rating of 8.3/10. The website's critics consensus reads, "Bryce Dallas Howard returns behind the camera to deliver an action-packed installment that has enough Easter eggs to keep diehards happy, while setting up plenty of exciting things to come."

Noel Murray of The New York Times praised director Bryce Dallas Howard: "Both of Howard's Mandalorian episodes so far have balanced thrilling action sequences with quieter character moments. I've started to look forward to seeing her name in the credits." Paul MacInnes of The Guardian wrote: "For me, the best bits of this week's episode were the descents. Two separate scenes of ships hurtling towards the ground looking very much like they were going to go splat—those were some high-octane TV thrills right there." Huw Fullerton of the Radio Times gave the episode 4 out of 5 and wrote: "Considering how sparse the storytelling for The Mandalorian was in season one, it's interesting to see how much more complex—and tied into previous Star Wars lore—it's becoming in season two." Keith Phipps of New York Magazine gave it 4 out of 5, and praised the writing for connecting more deeply with the Star Wars lore while keeping those details purely optional for more casual viewers. Katie Rife of The A.V. Club gave the episode a grade B. Rife praised the episode for adding new dimensions to the character of The Mandalorian, and the joy of watching Stormtroopers getting taken down, "flying around like wood chips off a chainsaw". She was disappointed that the Imperial Captain played by guest star Titus Welliver spoke with an American rather than a British accent like previous Imperials. She called the Frog Lady subplot sweet and heartwarming.
