= Poolman (film) =

2023 film by Chris Pine

- Theatrical release poster
- Directed by: Chris Pine
- Written by: Chris Pine; Ian Gotler
- Produced by: Stacey Sher; Patty Jenkins; Chris Pine; Ian Gotler
- Starring: Chris Pine; Annette Bening; DeWanda Wise; Stephen Tobolowsky; Clancy Brown; John Ortiz; Ray Wise; Juliet Mills; Jennifer Jason Leigh; Danny DeVito
- Cinematography: Matthew Jensen
- Edited by: Stacey Schroeder
- Music by: Andrew Bird
- Production companies: AGC Studios; Shiny Penny; Wicious Pictures; CatchLight Studios; Barry Linen Motion Pictures
- Distributed by: Vertical
- Release dates: September 11, 2023 (TIFF); May 10, 2024 (United States)
- Running time: 100 minutes
- Country: United States
- Language: English
- Box office: $153,325

Poolman is a 2023 American comedy mystery film directed, produced, co-written by and starring Chris Pine in his directorial debut. It also stars Annette Bening, DeWanda Wise, Stephen Tobolowsky, Clancy Brown, John Ortiz, Ray Wise, Juliet Mills, Jennifer Jason Leigh and Danny DeVito. The film follows Darren Barrenman (Pine), an unwavering optimist and native Angeleno, who spends his days looking after the pool of the Tahitian Tiki apartment block and campaigning to make his hometown a better place to live.

The film premiered at the 2023 Toronto International Film Festival. It was released in the United States on May 10, 2024.

== Plot ==
Darren Barrenman is a pool cleaner in Los Angeles, living in the old apartment complex The Tahitian Tiki owned by parental figures Jack and Diane. He is an advocate for LA, inspired by Erin Brockovich, constantly pitching his local council on potential improvements, to the disdain of councillor Stephen Toronkowski.

Darren's girlfriend Susan, fed up with his passion for causes but disinterested in progressing with their relationship, quietly and subtly says goodbye for good and leaves. Darren then proceeds to head out with Jack and Diane for another day of shooting their documentary on his quest to improve LA. Complaining vociferously at a public meeting chaired by Toronkowski, Darren accidentally injures an officer escorting him from the room and spends the night in jail.

Femme fatale June Del Rey bails him out of jail and wants Darren to investigate a real-estate plot by her boss Toronkowski. She says he is corrupt, accepts bribes, and is in contact with a property developer. He initially turns her down, then has a psychiatric session with Diane.

Deciding to meet up with June, despite Diane's distrust of her but with Jack's support, Darren tracks her down. They have a drink in an expensive club, where she explains she sought him out as she does not know how deep the corruption goes.

To track Toronkowski and photograph his misdeeds, Darren recruits an eclectic group of friends and fellow residents. This includes Susan, who has come with Wayne. Darren gets suspicious of the two being together. After taking some surveillance photos, the group goes out for a bite. There, Wayne blurts out that he and Susan slept together. A devastated Darren looks on as they kiss and then declare their mutual love. Diane saw it coming, while Jack is also incredulous.

Darren falls into a depression. After a few days, June shows up, urging him to get back on track on the investigation. Darren tells her about Susan dumping him, so she kisses him, then leaves.

Going to see Theodore Hollandaise, Darren briefly meets almond farmer William Van Patterson who is just leaving. Invited into the study, he tries to intimidate the real estate mogul by slapping down the photos. Hollandaise insists the photos show nothing incriminating.

Next, Darren follows Toronkowski to a venue where he watches him performing in a Golden Girls sketch, dressed in drag as Blanche. Going backstage, they make peace and bond. Toronkowski hints at an article being printed in a few days exposing Hollandaise, but before he can elaborate, he is shot dead with a silenced gun. The shooter frames Darren by tossing him the gun, so he has to run.

Darren, Jack and Diane start to understand a plot by Hollandaise and Van Patterson to abstract vital water resources from the ground underneath an apartment complex.

Showing up on June's doorstep unannounced, Darren tells her his subconscious made him realize she was being untruthful and that she is with Van Patterson. June reveals she actually his illegitimate daughter. She kisses him, apologizes and leaves. Darren finds a painted portrait of June and the almond farmer labeled 'The future Mr. and Mrs...', and rushes out to the mansion.

There Darren intervenes to prevent Van Patterson from smothering his enormously wealthy wife to death. June is with him and admits to be Van Patterson's lover, rejecting Darren's professions of love. As Van Patterson prepares to shoot Darren, Wayne arrives and reveals himself to be an FBI agent. He and his team arrest Van Patterson and June, the water is restored and Darren goes back to being a pool man, content.

== Cast ==
- Chris Pine as Darren Barrenman
- Annette Bening as Diane Espilnade
- DeWanda Wise as June Del Ray
- Stephen Tobolowsky as Stephen Toronkowski / Blanche
- Clancy Brown as Theodore Hollandaise
- John Ortiz as Wayne / Dirk Pfumpter
- Ray Wise as William Van Patterson
- Juliet Mills as Mrs. Van Patterson
- Jennifer Jason Leigh as Susan Kerkovish
- Danny DeVito as Jack Denisoff

== Production ==
It was announced in February 2022 that Chris Pine was set to make his directorial debut on the film, which he co-wrote the screenplay for with Ian Gotler. Pine starred in the film alongside Annette Bening and Danny DeVito. Pine came up with the idea for the film during a conversation with director Patty Jenkins, who served as a producer. In May, Ariana DeBose and Jennifer Jason Leigh were added to the cast, with Matthew Jensen set as cinematographer. In July, DeWanda Wise joined the cast replacing DeBose who left the project due to scheduling conflicts.

Filming began in June 2022 in Los Angeles. The film moved to post-production by November 2022, with the distribution rights being sold by AGC International to Paramount Pictures, StudioCanal, Lionsgate Films and other companies for multiple countries outside the United States. The rights for the UK and Ireland were sold to Signature Entertainment.

== Release ==
Poolman's world premiere took place at the 2023 Toronto International Film Festival on September 11, 2023. In December 2023, Vertical acquired the U.S. distribution rights to the film.

The film was released in the United States on May 10, 2024.

== Reception ==
On the review aggregator website Rotten Tomatoes, 22% of 58 critics' reviews are positive, with an average rating of 3.2/10. The website's consensus reads: "First-time director Chris Pine has clearly watched and loved numerous classic L.A.-based neo-noir comedies; unfortunately, Poolman suggests he'd have been better off not trying to add his own entry to the genre." Metacritic, which uses a weighted average, assigned the film a score of 29 out of 100, based on 15 critics, indicating "generally unfavorable" reviews.

Michael Rechtshaffen, writing for The Hollywood Reporter, called the film a "shrill misfire" and predicted that it would "likely have a tough time finding a home". Siddhant Adlakha from IndieWire opined that the film was "disastrous" and "[i]t's only 100 minutes long, but upward of 99 of those minutes are likely to be spent in silent boredom, if not irritated disbelief at being subjected to such guileless, artless nonsense".
