= Chapter 10: The Passenger =

- The Mandalorian episode
- Episode no.: Season 2 Episode 2
- Directed by: Peyton Reed
- Written by: Jon Favreau
- Cinematography by: Barry "Baz" Idoine
- Editing by: Andrew S. Eisen
- Original release date: November 6, 2020
- Running time: 38 minutes

Co-starring
- Amy Sedaris as Peli Motto; Misty Rosas as the Frog Lady; Richard Ayoade as the voice of Q9-0

Episode chronology
← Previous "Chapter 9: The Marshal"	Next → "Chapter 11: The Heiress"
- The Mandalorian season 2

"Chapter 10: The Passenger" is the second episode of the second season of the American streaming television series The Mandalorian. It was written by showrunner Jon Favreau and directed by Peyton Reed. It was released on Disney+ on November 6, 2020. The episode stars Pedro Pascal as the Mandalorian, a lone bounty hunter on the run with "the Child". It received generally positive reviews with praise toward the visuals and the horror centric approach to the series.

== Plot ==
Returning from Mos Pelgo, the Mandalorian subdues bandits who attempt to capture the Child. His speeder bike destroyed, the Mandalorian walks back to Mos Eisley, finding Peli Motto playing cards with Dr. Mandible, who has information about Mandalorians.

The Mandalorian must transport a passenger, the Frog Lady, to an estuary moon called Trask where her husband will fertilize her eggs, and has information about other Mandalorians. Because the eggs (some of which the Child surreptitiously eats) are so fragile, they have to travel at "sub-light speeds", despite the risk of being attacked by pirates. They encounter a New Republic patrol and the Razor Crest is forced to flee to a nearby planet (Note: The planet is Maldo Kreiss, translated from the ship's display screen. Previously seen in "Chapter 1: The Mandalorian".) and hide in an ice canyon. The ship crashes through the ice and is severely damaged. The Mandalorian wants to wait until morning to make repairs, due to the extreme cold.

The Frog Lady uses the severed head of the droid Q9-0 to translate and says they cannot wait, admonishing the Mandalorian for breaking his word, and he reluctantly begins repairs. Later they find the Frog Lady in a nearby hot water pool, bathing with her eggs. The Mandalorian warns her that it is not safe and collects the eggs. The Child explores the ice cave, finding another kind of egg, which he eats. Nearby eggs hatch, and soon the cave is filled with white spiders of various sizes. They are chased by a cluster of spiders, and a giant spider attacks. The spiders surround them from all sides, but they make it to the ship's cockpit. A spider climbs onto the Child but the Frog Lady vaporizes it with a tiny blaster.

As they take off, the giant spider attacks the ship, trapping them. They are saved by the X-wing pilots, who kill the spiders with blaster fire. There is an arrest warrant on the Mandalorian for freeing a dangerous prisoner. (Note: As depicted in "Chapter 6: The Prisoner".) They also note that the Mandalorian confined three other criminals and defended the prison guard, and so they are willing to overlook the incident. The Mandalorian asks for their help but they leave, warning that next time they might vaporize his ship. He finishes the repairs and the severely damaged ship continues the journey. The passenger and the Mandalorian fall asleep; the Child has somehow sneaked another egg which he happily gulps down.

== Production ==
=== Development ===
The episode was written by the series' creator Jon Favreau and directed by Peyton Reed.

The knobby white spiders are a species called Krykna and are based on conceptual art by Ralph McQuarrie. They were originally designed to appear in the swamps of the planet Dagobah in The Empire Strikes Back (1980).

Phil Szostak, creative art manager at Lucasfilm, compared the Child eating the Frog Lady's eggs to the eating of chicken eggs, "But obviously, chickens aren't sentient beings and the Child eating the eggs is intentionally disturbing, for comedic effect."

=== Casting ===
The co-starring actors cast for this episode are Amy Sedaris returning as Peli Motto, Misty Rosas as the Frog Lady and Richard Ayoade returning as the voice of Q9-0. Additional guest starring actors cast for this episode include Paul Sun-Hyung Lee as Captain Carson Teva and Dave Filoni returning as Trapper Wolf. Deborah Chow, who previously directed "Chapter 3: The Sin" and "Chapter 7: The Reckoning", was suggested to reprise her role as Sash Ketter from "Chapter 6: The Prisoner", but Filoni and his character replaced her due to Chow's commitments to Obi-Wan Kenobi. Lateef Crowder, Barry Lowin and Brendan Wayne are credited as stunt doubles for the Mandalorian. Dee Bradley Baker provided the voice for the Frog Lady.

=== Music ===
Ludwig Göransson composed the musical score for the episode. The featured tracks were released on November 20, 2020, in the first volume of the season two soundtrack.

== Reception ==
On Rotten Tomatoes, the episode received an approval rating of 85% based on reviews from 53 critics, with an average rating of 6.8/10. The website's critics consensus reads, "'The Passenger' has set-pieces in spades, but viewers looking for more narrative thrust may find its spectacular wheel-spinning more frustrating than fun."

Lauren Morgan of Entertainment Weekly gave the episode a positive review and wrote: "The second episode of the season still manages to be pretty entertaining on its own as Baby Yoda's appetite causes chaos and Mando finds the New Republic on his tail." Huw Fullerton of the Radio Times gave it 3 out of 5 and wrote: "While episode two is still all the action-packed fun we've come to expect from The Mandalorian... it's definitely a smaller, more standalone story as Mando (Pedro Pascal) fights off deadly ice spiders with a precious cargo."

Tyler Hersko of IndieWire gave the episode a "C" grade, praising the episode's horror-centric approach but criticizing the lack of forward momentum and character development. Cooper Hood of Screen Rant called the episode "disappointing," stating that "it feels more like a filler episode than one that is vital to The Mandalorian season 2's narrative."

The Frog Lady was positively received by fans. Huw Fullerton of the Radio Times was critical of the failure to give the character a proper name, out of keeping with the tradition of interesting character names in Star Wars.
