= List of 2024 box office number-one films in Mexico =

This is a list of films which placed number one at the weekend box office in Mexico for the year 2024.

| # | Date | Film | Gross (USD) | Openings in the top ten |
|---|---|---|---|---|
| 1 | January 7, 2024 | Aquaman and the Lost Kingdom | $5,032,581 | Night Swim (#6), Les Trois Mousquetaires: Milady (#10) |
| 2 | January 14, 2024 | Aquaman and the Lost Kingdom | $1,980,910 | Mean Girls (#2), The Beekeeper (#4), Soul (#10) |
| 3 | January 21, 2024 | El roomie | $1,537,134 | Anyone but You (#2) |
| 4 | January 28, 2024 | Anyone but You | $2,204,952 | Poor Things (#3), Concrete Utopia (#7) |
| 5 | February 4, 2024 | Anyone but You | $1,831,443 | Argylle (#3), Past Lives (#6), Anatomy of a Fall (#10) |
| 6 | February 11, 2024 | Anyone but You | $1,313,952 | Baghead (#6), Freelance (#9), Turning Red (#10) |
| 7 | February 18, 2024 | Madame Web | $2,879,261 | Todas Menos Tú (#2), Bob Marley: One Love (#3) |
| 8 | February 25, 2024 | Demon Slayer: Kimetsu no Yaiba – To the Hashira Training | $4,427,233 | Ferrari (#3), 57 Seconds (#9) |
| 9 | March 3, 2024 | Dune: Part Two | $4,356,492 | Desaparecer por Completo (#8) |
| 10 | March 10, 2024 | Dune: Part Two | $3,600,142 | Kung Fu Panda 4 (#2), Noche de Bodas (#3), No Way Up (#4), Alice in Terrorland (#6), Robot Dreams (#8) |
| 11 | March 17, 2024 | Kung Fu Panda 4 | $13,629,000 | One Life (#4), Imaginary (#6), Land of Bad (#9) |
| 12 | March 24, 2024 | Kung Fu Panda 4 | $7,520,832 | Ghostbusters: Frozen Empire (#2), The Iron Claw (#7) |
| 13 | March 31, 2024 | Godzilla x Kong: The New Empire | $14,126,905 | |
| 14 | April 7, 2024 | Godzilla x Kong: The New Empire | $10,404,921 | The First Omen (#3), Arthur the King (#5), Un actor malo (#8) |
| 15 | April 14, 2024 | Godzilla x Kong: The New Empire | $3,941,383 | Suga Agust D Tour: D Day - The Movie (#2), Sleeping Dogs (#7), Back to Black (#8), The Jack in the Box Rises (#9) |
| 16 | April 21, 2024 | Godzilla x Kong: The New Empire | $2,347,762 | Civil War (#3), Abigail (#6) |
| 17 | April 28, 2024 | Godzilla x Kong: The New Empire | $1,873,042 | Spy × Family Code: White (#4), Challengers (#7), Godless: The Eastfield Exorcism (#9) |
| 18 | May 5, 2024 | The Garfield Movie | $8,754,110 | The Fall Guy (#2), Jugaremos en el Bosque (#4) |
| 19 | May 12, 2024 | Kingdom of the Planet of the Apes | $7,187,593 | Firma Aquí (#9) |
| 20 | May 19, 2024 | Kingdom of the Planet of the Apes | $5,705,276 | IF (#3), Tarot (#4), Dream Scenario (#8), V de Víctor (#9) |
| 21 | May 26, 2024 | Kingdom of the Planet of the Apes | $3,189,371 | Furiosa: A Mad Max Saga (#3), Hachiko (#6) |
| 22 | June 2, 2024 | Kingdom of the Planet of the Apes | $2,524,420 | Immaculate (#5), Haikyuu!! The Dumpster Battle (#6), Ordinary Angels (#8), Flashover (#10) |
| 23 | June 9, 2024 | Bad Boys: Ride or Die | $5,304,958 | The Watchers (#6), Something in the Water (#9) |
| 24 | June 16, 2024 | Inside Out 2 | $29,855,385 | The Strangers: Chapter 1 (#5) |
| 25 | June 23, 2024 | Inside Out 2 | $21,614,314 | Hit Man (#3), The Bikeriders (#4), Rite Here Rite Now (#6), Exhuma (#7), Amelia's Children (#9) |
| 26 | June 30, 2024 | Inside Out 2 | $11,702,662 | A Quiet Place: Day One (#2) |
| 27 | July 7, 2024 | Despicable Me 4 | $16,174,952 | MaXXXine (#5), Jeanne du Barry (#6), The Great Escaper (#9) |
| 28 | July 14, 2024 | Despicable Me 4 | $9,073,713 | Twisters (#2), The Forbidden Play (#5), Fly Me to the Moon (#6) |
| 29 | July 21, 2024 | Despicable Me 4 | $7,567,011 | Entra en mi Vida (#7), Run Rabbit Run (#9) |
| 30 | July 28, 2024 | Deadpool & Wolverine | $19,183,518 | |
| 31 | August 4, 2024 | Deadpool & Wolverine | $13,453,269 | Late Night with the Devil (#5), The Exorcism (#6), Harold and the Purple Crayon (#7) |
| 32 | August 11, 2024 | Deadpool & Wolverine | $5,689,394 | It Ends with Us (#2), El Candidato Honesto (#4), Trap (#5), Borderlands (#10) |
| 33 | August 18, 2024 | It Ends with Us | $4,888,032 | Alien: Romulus (#2), Coraline: 15th Anniversary (#4), Mothers' Instinct (#9) |
| 34 | August 25, 2024 | It Ends with Us | $2,000,000 | The Forge (#4), Caras Vemos... (#6), Blink Twice (#7), The Crow (#8), Kinds of Kindness (#10) |
| 35 | September 1, 2024 | Longlegs | $1,672,535 | The Inseparables (#10) |
| 36 | September 8, 2024 | Beetlejuice Beetlejuice | $8,158,947 | The Canterville Ghost (#10) |
| 37 | September 15, 2024 | Beetlejuice Beetlejuice | $4,703,592 | Transformers One (#2), Speak No Evil (#3), Casi el Paraíso (#5) |
| 38 | September 22, 2024 | Beetlejuice Beetlejuice | $4,125,006 | Jungkook: I am Still (#2), The Wild Robot (#6), The Substance (#7), Hellboy: The Crooked Man (#9) |
| 39 | September 29, 2024 | The Wild Robot | $2,901,827 | Never Let Go (#7) |
| 40 | October 6, 2024 | Joker: Folie à Deux | $5,500,000 | My Penguin Friend (#9), Firebrand (#10) |
| 41 | October 13, 2024 | The Wild Robot | $3,121,884 | My Hero Academia: You're Next (#5), The Wingwalker (#6), Woman of the Hour (#7), Dragonkeeper (#9) |
| 42 | October 20, 2024 | The Wild Robot | $2,709,918 | Smile 2 (#3), The Count of Monte Cristo (#5), El Apocalipsis de San Juan (#6) |
| 43 | October 27, 2024 | Venom: The Last Dance | $7,377,239 | The Apprentice (#8), Megalopolis (#9) |
| 44 | November 3, 2024 | Venom: The Last Dance | $6,004,852 | Terrifier 3 (#3), We Live in Time (#4), María, ¡Me Muero! (#6) |
| 45 | November 10, 2024 | Venom: The Last Dance | $3,373,841 | Red One (#2), Todos los Nombres de Dios (#7), Párvulos: Hijos del Apocalipsis (#9) |
| 46 | November 17, 2024 | Gladiator II | $4,700,000 | |
| 47 | November 24, 2024 | Wicked | $4,896,385 | Heretic (#7), Straight: ¿Cuál es tu Secreto? (#9), Dogs at the Opera (#10) |
| 48 | December 1, 2024 | Moana 2 | $12,488,801 | Elevation (#10) |
| 49 | December 8, 2024 | Moana 2 | $5,053,560 | Turno Nocturno (#5), The Lord of the Rings: The War of the Rohirrim (#7), White Bird (#8), Sujo (#10) |
| 50 | December 15, 2024 | Moana 2 | $3,024,048 | Kraven the Hunter (#2), Niko: Beyond the Northern Lights (#8), The Djinn (#9) |
| 51 | December 22, 2024 | Mufasa: The Lion King | $7,390,464 | Sting (#8), The Room Next Door (#9) |
| 52 | December 29, 2024 | Sonic the Hedgehog 3 | $10,300,000 | Una Pequeña Confusión (#4), Babygirl (#7) |

== Highest-grossing films ==
Highest-grossing films of 2024
| Rank | Title | Distributor | Mex gross US$ | Mex gross MX$ |
|---|---|---|---|---|
| 1. | Inside Out 2 | Disney | $102,298,790 | $1,976,719,519 |
| 2. | Despicable Me 4 | Universal | $45,288,770 | $873,325,421 |
| 3. | Deadpool & Wolverine | Disney | $43,529,253 | $862,580,030 |
| 4. | Kung Fu Panda 4 | Universal | $36,158,664 | $606,200,000 |
| 5. | Godzilla x Kong: The New Empire | Warner Bros. | $33,864,544 | $562,700,032 |
| 6. | Mufasa: The Lion King | Disney | $31,371,339 | $633,512,819 |
| 7. | Moana 2 | Disney | $30,552,234 | $627,096,823 |
| 8. | Sonic the Hedgehog 3 | Paramount | $22,100,000 | $455,900,900 |
| 9. | The Wild Robot | Universal | $21,010,747 | $422,575,287 |
| 10. | Venom: The Last Dance | Sony | $20,002,445 | $413,364,272 |

== See also ==
- List of Mexican films — Mexican films by year
- 2024 in Mexico

| Preceded by 2023 | Box office number-one films 2024 | Succeeded by 2025 |
