= List of 2021 box office number-one films in Mexico =

This is a list of films which placed number one at the weekend box office in Mexico for the year 2021.

== Number-one films ==
#	Date	Film	Gross (USD)	Openings in the top ten
1	January 3, 2021	Wonder Woman 1984	$391,891	Come Away (#3), The 100 Candles Game (#6)
2	January 10, 2021	Wonder Woman 1984	$219,834	Prityazhenie 2 (#3), The Head Hunter (#4)
3	January 17, 2021	Wonder Woman 1984	$136,373	Dreambuilders (#5), Harry Potter and the Philosopher's Stone (#6), Harry Potter and the Prisoner of Azkaban (#10)
4	January 24, 2021	Wonder Woman 1984	$115,147	The Owners (#3), Harry Potter and the Goblet of Fire (#6)
5	January 31, 2021	The Croods: A New Age	$92,350	Vdova (#3), Harry Potter and the Deathly Hallows – Part 1 (#6)
6	February 7, 2021	The Croods: A New Age	$84,631	Amjeon (#6)
7	February 14, 2021	Wonder Woman 1984	$80,190	The Captain (#3), Bigfoot Family (#8)
8	February 21, 2021	Tom & Jerry	$372,024	Monster Hunter (#2)
9	February 28, 2021	Tom & Jerry	$397,978	Wild Mountain Thyme (#4)
10	March 7, 2021	Tom & Jerry	$419,019	Chaos Walking (#2), 10 Things We Should Do Before We Break Up (#6)
11	March 14, 2021	Tom & Jerry	$324,002	Juega Conmigo (#3), The Little Things (#4), Pinocchio (#5), Fate Stay Night (#7)
12	March 21, 2021	The Marksman	$419,387	Ooops! The Adventure Continues (#6)
13	March 28, 2021	Godzilla vs. Kong	$5,344,112	
14	April 4, 2021	Godzilla vs. Kong	$3,840,302	The War with Grandpa (#2), The Father (#5), Violet Evergarden: The Movie (#6)
15	April 11, 2021	Godzilla vs. Kong	$1,794,082	Relic (#3), Después de Ti (#4), The Lord of the Rings: The Fellowship of the Ring (#7), Promising Young Woman (#9), The Lord of the Rings: The Return of the King (#10)
16	April 18, 2021	Godzilla vs. Kong	$1,014,392	Mortal Kombat (#2), Nomadland (#10)
17	April 25, 2021	The Unholy	$1,273,193	Demon Slayer: Kimetsu no Yaiba – The Movie: Mugen Train (#2), Todo lo Invisible (#6)
18	May 2, 2021	The Unholy	$1,302,019	Nobody (#4), Penguin Bloom (#7), Mara (#8), No, Porque me Enamoro (#9)
19	May 9, 2021	The Unholy	$656,865	El Exorcismo de Carmen Farías (#2), Half Brothers (#3)
20	May 16, 2021	The Unholy	$476,081	Peter Rabbit 2: The Runaway (#2), Spiral (#3), Those Who Wish Me Dead (#5)
21	May 23, 2021	Wrath of Man	$469,098	Los Trapos Sucios se Lavan en Casa (#5), The Seventh Day (#6)
22	May 30, 2021	Cruella	$2,565,019	Breaking Surface (#6), Boss Level (#7)
23	June 6, 2021	The Conjuring: The Devil Made Me Do It	$5,982,998	My Salinger Year (#5)
24	June 13, 2021	The Conjuring: The Devil Made Me Do It	$3,093,813	A Quiet Place Part II (#2), Spirit Untamed (#4), Another Round (#5), Hitman's Wife's Bodyguard (#6), Los Lobos (#9)
25	June 20, 2021	The Conjuring: The Devil Made Me Do It	$1,499,021	In the Heights (#6), Cosas Imposibles (#7)
26	June 27, 2021	Fast & Furious 9	$9,072,091	
27	July 4, 2021	Fast & Furious 9	$4,654,917	The Forever Purge (#2)
28	July 11, 2021	Black Widow	$4,712,081	I Carry You With Me (#8)
29	July 18, 2021	Space Jam: A New Legacy	$3,197,233	El Mesero (#3), Lake of Death (#6), Someone, Somewhere (#10)
30	July 25, 2021	Space Jam: A New Legacy	$1,354,821	The Boss Baby: Family Business (#2), Old (#3), Snake Eyes (#7)
31	August 1, 2021	Jungle Cruise	$1,063,394	The Comeback Trail (#9)
32	August 8, 2021	The Suicide Squad	$1,944,021	Blackpink: The Movie (#4)
33	August 15, 2021	The Suicide Squad	$834,294	Free Guy (#2), Un Rescate de Huevitos (#3), Don't Breathe 2 (#4)
34	August 22, 2021	PAW Patrol: The Movie	$864,000	Reminiscence (#6), Ni Tuyo, Ni Mía (#7)
35	August 29, 2021	PAW Patrol: The Movie	$494,019	Candyman (#3), Way Down (#6)
36	September 5, 2021	Shang-Chi and the Legend of the Ten Rings	$2,400,000	After We Fell (#3)
37	September 12, 2021	Shang-Chi and the Legend of the Ten Rings	$1,382,924	The Ice Road (#2), Malignant (#3)
38	September 19, 2021	Shang-Chi and the Legend of the Ten Rings	$1,204,943	Chilangolandia (#2), Escape Room: Tournament of Champions (#5), Ainbo: Spirit of the Amazon (#6), Cry Macho (#9)
39	September 26, 2021	Shang-Chi and the Legend of the Ten Rings	$664,849	The Night House (#2), CODA (#3), Black Water: Abyss (#6)
40	October 3, 2021	No Time to Die	$2,394,092	Show Me the Father (#10)
41	October 10, 2021	Venom: Let There Be Carnage	$8,013,749	Fatima (#9)
42	October 17, 2021	Venom: Let There Be Carnage	$4,396,504	Halloween Kills (#2), The Addams Family 2 (#3), The Last Duel (#5)
43	October 24, 2021	Dune	$2,289,210	Ron's Gone Wrong (#5), The Evil Next Door (#8), Skyfire (#9), You Are Not Alone (#10)
44	October 31, 2021	Venom: Let There Be Carnage	$1,079,290	Antlers (#3), Last Night in Soho (#6), Monster Family 2 (#8)
45	November 7, 2021	Eternals	$5,681,151	
46	November 14, 2021	Eternals	$4,605,741	Harry Potter and the Philosopher's Stone (#3), Chernobyl: Abyss (#5), Rock Dog 2: Rock Around the Park (#8), Sea Fever (#10)
47	November 21, 2021	Ghostbusters: Afterlife	$2,304,347	
48	November 28, 2021	Encanto	$1,513,582	House of Gucci (#3), Resident Evil: Welcome to Raccoon City (#5), Vivo (#8)
49	December 5, 2021	Encanto	$1,073,732	King Richard (#4), Run Hide Fight (#8) Playhouse (#10)
50	December 12, 2021	Encanto	$703,941	Clifford the Big Red Dog (#2), West Side Story (#9), The Matrix (#10)
51	December 19, 2021	Spider-Man: No Way Home	$32,400,000	
52	December 26, 2021	Spider-Man: No Way Home	$9,926,800	Sing 2 (#2), The Matrix Resurrections (#3)
53	January 2, 2022	Spider-Man: No Way Home	$11,230,920	The King's Man (#4), Karem, La Posesión (#5), Lamb (#9)

== Highest-grossing films ==
Highest-grossing films of 2021
Rank	Title	Distributor	Mex gross US$	Mex gross MX$
1.	Spider-Man: No Way Home	Sony	$81,165,976	$1,615,805,458
2.	Fast & Furious 9	Universal	$26,260,884	$518,410,267
3.	Venom: Let There Be Carnage	Sony	$24,600,000	$502,200,000
4.	Godzilla vs. Kong	Warner Bros.	$20,532,034	$407,652,511
5.	The Conjuring: The Devil Made Me Do It	Warner Bros.	$16,901,686	$338,631,992
6.	Eternals	Disney	$15,296,153	$313,784,195
7.	Sing 2	Universal	$13,767,448	$274,164,959
8.	Cruella	Disney	$11,667,977	$231,872,031
9.	Black Widow	Disney	$9,860,459	$193,912,768
10.	Space Jam: A New Legacy	Warner Bros.	$8,087,696	$163,901,658

== See also ==
- List of Mexican films — Mexican films by year

Preceded by 2020	Box office number-one films of Mexico; 2021	Succeeded by 2022
