= Pirate Dad =

- Theatrical release poster
- Directed by: Humberto Hinojosa
- Written by: Yibran Asuad; Anton Goenechea; Pedro "Zulu" González
- Starring: Miguel Rodarte; Luis de la Rosa
- Cinematography: Marc Bellver
- Edited by: Joaquim Martí
- Release date: 25 October 2019 (Mexico)
- Country: Mexico
- Language: Spanish

Pirate Dad (Spanish: Un papá pirata, lit. 'A pirate dad') is a 2019 Mexican comedy-drama film directed by Humberto Hinojosa. The film premiered on 25 October 2019, and is stars Miguel Rodarte, and Luis de la Rosa.

== Plot ==
The plot revolves around Ian, a 16-year-old rebel teenager, who for his graduation video faces a botarga (mascot) and is forced to work to amend his mistake. Everything will get tangled up when Ian learns that his dad is not his real father. The two have a very close relationship, they are even similar, so this news causes both to be disappointed. Ian embarks on a journey with the objective of finding André, his biological father, who lived his glory days in the 80s as a telenovela actor, but is currently an alcoholic who works as a botarga. What started as a nightmare becomes a lucrative business of clandestine fights and extravagant people who spend the day dressed up as pets.

== Cast ==
- Miguel Rodarte as André
- Luis de la Rosa as Ian
- Juan Pablo Medina as Gaspar
- Natasha Dupeyrón as Sara
- Marcela Guirado as Cassandra
- Dominika Paleta as Bea
- Ernesto Laguardia as Himserlf
- Adal Ramones as himself
- Andrés Almeida as Jorge
- Paco Rueda as Ambrón
- José Luis Slobotzky as la vena
