= List of 2017 box office number-one films in Mexico =

This is a list of films which placed number one at the weekend box office for the year 2017.

#	Date	Film	Gross (USD)	Openings in the top ten
1	January 8, 2017	Assassin's Creed	$3,757,472	Monster Trucks (#2), Incarnate (#6)
2	January 15, 2017	Assassin's Creed	$1,515,952	Allied (#2), I.T. (#9)
3	January 22, 2017	xXx: Reactivated	$2,686,268	A Monster Calls (#5), La La Land (#7)
4	January 29, 2017	Resident Evil: The Final Chapter	$3,198,531	A Dog's Purpose (#2), El Tamaño Sí Importa (#4)
5	February 5, 2017	The Great Wall	$2,506,986	Rings (#3), Hidden Figures (#6)
6	February 12, 2017	Fifty Shades Darker	$2,692,198	The Lego Batman Movie (#2), Everybody Loves Somebody (#3), Hell or High Water (#10)
7	February 19, 2017	Split	$2,036,998	Marauders (#9), Lion (#10)
8	February 26, 2017	Split	$1,542,628	John Wick: Chapter 2 (#3), Mientras el Lobo No Está (#4), El Que Busca Encuentra (#5), A Cure for Wellness (#6), Silence (#10)
9	March 5, 2017	Logan	$5,297,571	Rock Dog (#4), The Space Between Us (#7), Sword Art Online The Movie: Ordinal Scale (#9)
10	March 12, 2017	Kong: Skull Island	$5,593,974	Manhattan Night (#9)
11	March 19, 2017	Beauty and the Beast	$11,786,031	The Founder (#5), T2 Trainspotting (#6)
12	March 26, 2017	Beauty and the Beast	$4,968,698	Power Rangers (#2), Life (#3)
13	April 2, 2017	The Boss Baby	$6,569,833	Ghost in the Shell (#2), 3 Idiotas (#3), Boomerang (#10)
14	April 9, 2017	The Boss Baby	$3,759,019	Smurfs: The Lost Village (#2), The Shack (#6), CHiPs (#7), 1974: La Posesión de Altair (#9)
15	April 16, 2017	Fast & Furious 8	$17,709,350	Raw (#8), The Innocents (#9)
16	April 23, 2017	Fast & Furious 8	$5,274,333	Going in Style (#3), The Autopsy of Jane Doe (#4), Ozzy (#6), Patriots Day (#7)
17	April 30, 2017	Guardians of the Galaxy Vol. 2	$8,195,948	Don't Knock Twice (#5), The Odyssey (#10)
18	May 7, 2017	How to Be a Latin Lover	$7,258,018	A Silent Voice (#5), Collide (#7)
19	May 14, 2017	How to Be a Latin Lover	$4,404,217	Alien: Covenant (#2), King Arthur: Legend of the Sword (#3), Richard the Stork (#5), Un Sac de Billes (#10)
20	May 21, 2017	How to Be a Latin Lover	$2,422,628	The Healer (#4), Unforgettable (#6), The Bye Bye Man (#9), À Fond (#10)
21	May 28, 2017	Pirates of the Caribbean: Salazar's Revenge	$6,901,642	Get Out (#3), Fairy Tail: Dragon Cry (#10)
22	June 4, 2017	Wonder Woman	$8,224,311	Sadako vs. Kayako (#7), Pelé: Birth of a Legend (#9)
23	June 11, 2017	The Mummy	$4,926,168	A Family Man (#4), Highway to Hellas (#9)
24	June 18, 2017	Cars 3	$5,803,801	Baywatch (#2), Resident Evil: Vendetta (#6), Colossal (#7), A Man Called Ove (#9)
25	June 25, 2017	Cars 3	$3,888,195	Everything, Everything (#5), The Bride (#6), Snatched (#8), Las Hijas de Abril (#9)
26	July 2, 2017	Despicable Me 3	$14,117,715	Churchill (#8), It Comes at Night (#9)
27	July 9, 2017	Spider-Man: Homecoming	$11,679,553	Juego Siniestro (#9)
28	July 16, 2017	Spider-Man: Homecoming	$4,316,727	Transformers: The Last Knight 3D (#3), Gifted (#4), Wish Upon (#5), 2:22 (#6), The Girl with All the Gifts (#7)
29	July 23, 2017	Transformers: The Last Knight	$7,797,060	The Wall (#7), Vive por Mí (#9), Demain Tout Commence (#10)
30	July 30, 2017	War for the Planet of the Apes	$6,606,295	Dunkirk (#3), Before I Fall (#7)
31	August 6, 2017	The Emoji Movie	$2,873,323	Valerian and the City of a Thousand Planets (#3), Amityville: The Awakening (#6), Your Name (#10)
32	August 13, 2017	Hazlo Como Hombre	$3,230,035	Baby Driver (#2), Captain Underpants: The First Epic Movie (#5), The Circle (#9)
33	August 20, 2017	Annabelle: Creation	$6,226,180	The Nut Job 2: Nutty by Nature (#4), Kidnap (#6)
34	August 27, 2017	Annabelle: Creation	$2,919,086	The Dark Tower (#2), The Hitman's Bodyguard (#3)
35	September 3, 2017	Annabelle: Creation	$1,785,684	Atomic Blonde (#2), Deep (#5), ¿Cómo Matar a un Esposo Muerto? (#7), Guardians (#8)
36	September 10, 2017	Annabelle: Creation	$1,022,931	Home Again (#2), Happy Family (#4), Open Water 3: Cage Dive (#5)
37	September 17, 2017	It	$10,385,206	American Made (#2), Isla Calaca (#3)
38	September 24, 2017	It	$4,240,536	Me Gusta pero Me Asusta (#2), mother! (#3), American Assassin (#6), Attraction (#7)
39	October 1, 2017	Kingsman: The Golden Circle	$2,480,725	The Lego Ninjago Movie (#4), Wind River (#7)
40	October 8, 2017	Blade Runner 2049	$1,543,118	The Mountain Between Us (#2), My Little Pony: The Movie (#6), Security (#10)
41	October 15, 2017	Cómo Cortar a tu Patán	$2,116,372	Flatliners (#2), Condorito: La Película (#4)
42	October 22, 2017	Geostorm	$3,517,822	Escape Room (#7)
43	October 29, 2017	Coco	$9,291,903	Happy Death Day (#3), The Ten Commandments: The Movie (#6), The Glass Castle (#6), Mark Felt: The Man Who Brought Down the White House (#9)
44	November 5, 2017	Coco	$10,788,880	Thor: Ragnarok (#2), Pokémon the Movie: I Choose You! (#5), Jeepers Creepers 3 (#6), Tigers Are Not Afraid (#7), Breathe (#8), The Big Sick (#9)
45	November 12, 2017	Coco	$8,352,284	Murder on the Orient Express (#3), Jigsaw (#4), Brad's Status (#8), Professor Marston and the Wonder Women (#10)
46	November 19, 2017	Justice League	$9,646,725	47 Meters Down (#5), Ghibil Fest 2017: Spirited Away (#7), Les Ex (#8)
47	November 26, 2017	Justice League	$3,818,941	Daddy's Home 2 (#3), Suburbicon (#6), The Jungle Bunch: The Movie (#7), Overdrive (#9), Loving Vincent (#10)
48	December 3, 2017	Daddy's Home 2	$4,987,755	Camino a Marte (#4), Big Bang Made (#5), The Son of Bigfoot (#6)
49	December 10, 2017	Daddy's Home 2	$1,611,118	A Bad Moms Christmas (#2), Wonder (#4), The Star (#7), Cometa: Él, Su Perro y su Mundo (#9), Acts of Vengeance (#10)
50	December 17, 2017	Star Wars: The Last Jedi	$6,670,787	Don't Hang Up (#7)
51	December 24, 2017	Jumanji: Welcome to the Jungle	$4,695,948	Ferdinand (#3), Cuando los Hijos Regresan (#5)
52	December 31, 2017	The Greatest Showman	$2,720,269	The Foreigner (#8)

== Highest-grossing films ==
Highest-grossing films of 2017
Rank	Title	Distributor	Mex gross US$	Mex gross MX$
1.	Coco	Disney	$57,628,479	$1,120,240,000
2.	Fast & Furious 8	Universal	$36,309,142	$660,299,902
3.	Despicable Me 3	Universal	$34,804,796	$644,463,709
4.	Beauty and the Beast	Disney	$29,968,579	$564,650,329
5.	It	Warner Bros.	$27,600,000	$491,278,338
6.	Spider-Man: Homecoming	Sony	$27,069,013	$490,390,203
7.	How to Be a Latin Lover	Videocine	$24,928,324	$453,000,000
8.	Justice League	Warner Bros.	$24,800,000	$463,750,040
9.	The Boss Baby	20th Century Fox	$23,177,795	$436,220,194
10.	Wonder Woman	Warner Bros.	$22,500,000	$419,890,084

== See also ==
- List of Mexican films — Mexican films by year

Preceded by 2016	Box office number-one films of Mexico; 2017	Succeeded by 2018
