= List of 2022 box office number-one films in Mexico =

This is a list of films which placed number one at the weekend box office in Mexico for the year 2022.

== Number-one films ==
#	Date	Film	Gross (USD)	Openings in the top ten
1	January 9, 2022	Spider-Man: No Way Home	$2,980,319	My Hero Academia: World Heroes' Mission (#3), The 355 (#6), Row 19 (#7)
2	January 16, 2022	Spider-Man: No Way Home	$1,565,893	Scream (#2), Spencer (#4)
3	January 23, 2022	Spider-Man: No Way Home	$918,265	Jack in the Box (#4), Benedetta (#7), Belle (#10)
4	January 30, 2022	Nightmare Alley	$847,884	The Call (#5), Pil's Adventures (#6)
5	February 6, 2022	Moonfall	$1,164,018	The Medium (#5), Fireheart (#8), Jackass Forever (#9)
6	February 13, 2022	Marry Me	$630,000	Death on the Nile (#4), The Exorcism of God (#6), The Beatles: Get Back – The Rooftop Concert (#10)
7	February 20, 2022	Uncharted	$2,400,000	¡Qué despadre! (#2)
8	February 27, 2022	Uncharted	$1,538,393	Digimon Adventure: Last Evolution Kizuna (#4), The Reckoning (#6)
9	March 6, 2022	The Batman	$11,727,980	
10	March 13, 2022	The Batman	$8,233,601	Blacklight (#2), Cuarentones (#5), Sword Art Online Progressive: Aria of a Starless Night (#7), Hall (#8), Belfast (#10)
11	March 20, 2022	The Batman	$4,169,593	The Bad Guys (#2), Ambulance (#3), The Worst Person in the World (#7)
12	March 27, 2022	The Batman	$1,806,964	Jujutsu Kaisen 0 (#2), The Protégé (#5), See for Me (#7)
13	April 3, 2022	Morbius	$3,787,631	Dos más dos (#6)
14	April 10, 2022	Sonic the Hedgehog 2	$8,139,877	¿Y cómo es él? (#3), The Desperate Hour (#6)
15	April 17, 2022	Fantastic Beasts: The Secrets of Dumbledore	$7,264,919	The Northman (#5), Behind You (#8)
16	April 24, 2022	Fantastic Beasts: The Secrets of Dumbledore	$3,972,808	The Lost City (#3), Sin ti no puedo (#10)
17	May 1, 2022	Sonic the Hedgehog 2	$2,667,216	La Abuela (#5), The Unbearable Weight of Massive Talent (#9)
18	May 8, 2022	Doctor Strange in the Multiverse of Madness	$20,884,093	
19	May 15, 2022	Doctor Strange in the Multiverse of Madness	$10,259,850	Memory (#3), Firestarter (#6), La Nave (#8)
20	May 22, 2022	Doctor Strange in the Multiverse of Madness	$4,682,072	Dog (#4), Jurassic Park Re-release (#8), Father Stu (#10)
21	May 29, 2022	Top Gun: Maverick	$5,550,409	X (#7)
22	June 5, 2022	Jurassic World Dominion	$18,127,000	La Civil (#9)
23	June 12, 2022	Jurassic World Dominion	$12,128,362	Diavlo (#4), The Colony (#6), Everything Everywhere All at Once (#7), Ride Like a Girl (#10)
24	June 19, 2022	Lightyear	$7,813,598	
25	June 26, 2022	Lightyear	$6,611,878	The Black Phone (#3), Adieu Monsieur Haffmann (#8), Tout Nous Sourit (#9)
26	July 3, 2022	Minions: The Rise of Gru	$12,709,736	
27	July 10, 2022	Thor: Love and Thunder	$11,630,259	I'm Your Man (#8)
28	July 17, 2022	Thor: Love and Thunder	$7,473,403	Elvis (#4), The Twin (#6)
29	July 24, 2022	Minions: The Rise of Gru	$4,213,237	Shut In (#7), Un Retrato de Familia (#8)
30	July 31, 2022	Minions: The Rise of Gru	$2,897,412	DC League of Super-Pets (#3), The Ledge (#6), Martyrs Lane (#7), Good Luck to You, Leo Grande (#9)
31	August 7, 2022	Bullet Train	$3,000,000	
32	August 14, 2022	Bullet Train	$2,300,000	Beast (#2), Paws of Fury: The Legend of Hank (#6)
33	August 21, 2022	Dragon Ball Super: Super Hero	$3,700,000	The Cellar (#5)
34	August 28, 2022	Dragon Ball Super: Super Hero	$2,214,952	Nope (#3), After Ever Happy (#7)
35	September 4, 2022	Dragon Ball Super: Super Hero	$898,279	Fall (#3), Spider-Man: No Way Home - The More Fun Stuff Version (#5), Where the Crawdads Sing (#6), Lecciones para Canallas (#9)
36	September 11, 2022	Fall	$1,295,883	Soy tu Fan (#2), The Invitation (#7)
37	September 18, 2022	Orphan: First Kill	$2,308,040	Tadeo El Explorador 3: La Maldición de la Momia (#2), Cuando Sea Joven (#4), Barbarian (#10)
38	September 25, 2022	Orphan: First Kill	$2,192,942	Avatar (Re-release) (#2), Don't Worry Darling (#3), Mal de Ojo (#5)
39	October 2, 2022	Smile	$2,029,665	Emergency Declaration (#5), Águila y Jaguar: Guerreros Legendarios (#8), Till Death (#10)
40	October 9, 2022	Smile	$2,652,756	Ticket to Paradise (#2), Last Seen Alive (#5), Amsterdam (#8)
41	October 16, 2022	Halloween Ends	$2,977,235	The Woman King (#4), Gulliver Returns (#7)
42	October 23, 2022	Black Adam	$5,867,734	The Boy Behind the Door (#7)
43	October 30, 2022	Black Adam	$4,101,090	Prey for the Devil (#2), Lyle, Lyle, Crocodile (#3), Hard Hit (#7), Bros (#10)
44	November 6, 2022	Black Adam	$3,483,880	One Piece Film: Red (#2), La Exorcista (#5), Mrs. Harris Goes to Paris (#9)
45	November 13, 2022	Black Panther: Wakanda Forever	$13,181,250	
46	November 20, 2022	Black Panther: Wakanda Forever	$10,010,544	Jeepers Creepers: Reborn (#3), The Menu (#4), The Cursed: Dead Man's Prey (#6), The Twilight Saga (Re-release) (#7), Ojos Que No Ven (#8)
47	November 27, 2022	Black Panther: Wakanda Forever	$6,279,309	Strange World (#2), El Poderoso Victoria (#6), Kandisha (#8)
48	December 4, 2022	Black Panther: Wakanda Forever	$3,003,826	Violent Night (#3), The North Sea (#4), Devotion (#9)
49	December 11, 2022	Black Panther: Wakanda Forever	$1,176,967	Puss in Boots: The Last Wish (#2), Shark Bait (#6), Letto Numero 6 (#8), Tre Nøtter Til Askepott (#10)
50	December 18, 2022	Avatar: The Way of Water	$15,645,027	
51	December 25, 2022	Avatar: The Way of Water	$12,047,011	A Man Called Otto (#4), Mi Suegra Me Odia (#5)
52	January 1, 2023	Avatar: The Way of Water	$11,120,394	M3GAN (#3), Malvada (#7)

== Highest-grossing films ==
Highest-grossing films of 2022
Rank	Title	Distributor	Mex gross US$	Mex gross MX$
1.	Avatar: The Way of Water	20th Century	$58,868,504	$1,060,268,852
2.	Jurassic World Dominion	Universal	$43,013,205	$774,702,233
3.	Doctor Strange in the Multiverse of Madness	Disney	$41,148,031	$741,108,957
4.	Minions: The Rise of Gru	Universal	$40,143,893	$723,023,628
5.	Black Panther: Wakanda Forever	Disney	$36,438,556	$656,287,544
6.	The Batman	Warner Bros.	$32,048,662	$577,222,041
7.	Thor: Love and Thunder	Disney	$29,095,575	$524,034,582
8.	Puss in Boots: The Last Wish	Universal	$27,836,692	$501,361,092
9.	Sonic the Hedgehog 2	Paramount	$22,384,546	$403,163,581
10.	Lightyear	Disney	$17,291,903	$311,441,007

== See also ==
- List of Mexican films — Mexican films by year

Preceded by 2021	Box office number-one films of Mexico; 2022	Succeeded by 2023
