= List of 2026 box office number-one films in Mexico =

Continuing the on-going lists of #1 films at the box office in Mexico during 2026

This is a list of films which placed number one at the weekend box office in Mexico for the year 2026.

#	Date	Film	Gross (USD)	Openings in the top ten
1	January 4, 2026	Avatar: Fire and Ash	$9,241,286	The Housemaid (#4), Song Sung Blue (#8)
2	January 11, 2026	Avatar: Fire and Ash	$3,022,739	Primate (#4), Un Hombre por Semana (#7), Rental Family (#8)
3	January 18, 2026	Avatar: Fire and Ash	$1,721,481	Marty Supreme (#2), 28 Years Later: The Bone Temple (#3), No Other Choice (#6), Tom and Jerry: Forbidden Compass (#7), The Last Breath (#9)
4	January 25, 2026	Avatar: Fire and Ash	$984,422	Mercy (#3), Return to Silent Hill (#4), Bendito Corazón (#6), Familia a la Deriva (#7), Sirāt (#10)
5	February 1, 2026	Send Help	$1,095,646	Hamnet (#5), Cold Storage (#8), Sobriedad Me Estás Matando (#9), The Lord of the Rings: The Fellowship of the Ring - Extended Edition (#10)
6	February 8, 2026	Stray Kids: The DominATE Experience	$2,100,000	Greenland 2: Migration (#2), The Lord of the Rings: The Two Towers - Extended Edition (#10)
7	February 15, 2026	Wuthering Heights	$3,097,947	¿Quieres Ser Mi Novia? (#2), Goat (#3), Crime 101 (#5)
8	February 22, 2026	Wuthering Heights	$2,025,000	Kill Bill: The Whole Bloody Affair (#5), Keeper (#6), Little Amélie or the Character of Rain (#8)
9	March 1, 2026	Scream 7	$2,711,853	Twenty One Pilots: More Than We Ever Imagined (#4), Venganza (#6), Nuremberg (#7), The Secret Agent (#9)
10	March 8, 2026	Hoppers	$3,145,000	The Bride! (#3), Enhypen: Walk the Line - Summer Edition (#5)
11	March 15, 2026	Hoppers	$3,052,967	Socias por Accidente (#2), Shelter (#4), Reminders of Him (#5), David (#10)
12	March 22, 2026	Project Hail Mary	$2,645,294	Psicópata: El Asesino del Conejo Blanco (#6), El Museo de los Warren: Un Caso Real (#7)
13	March 29, 2026	Project Hail Mary	$2,834,870	How to Make a Killing (#3), Ready or Not 2: Here I Come (#5), They Will Kill You (#7), Rocío Dúrcal: 20 Años sin Ti (#8)
14	April 5, 2026	The Super Mario Galaxy Movie	$22,080,896	The Strangers – Chapter 3 (#6), Sundays (#8)
15	April 12, 2026	The Super Mario Galaxy Movie	$16,425,437	BTS World Tour: 'Arirang' in Goyang - Live Viewing (#2), The Drama (#3), Protector (#7), Good Luck, Have Fun, Don't Die (#8)
16	April 19, 2026	The Super Mario Galaxy Movie	$5,295,059	Lee Cronin's The Mummy (#2), BTS World Tour: 'Arirang' in Japan - Live Viewing (#3), Boulevard (#5), The Wizard of the Kremlin (#7), Donnie Darko: 25th Anniversary (#9), Pillion (#10)
17	April 26, 2026	Michael	$9,713,000	Exit 8 (#7), La Familia del Barrio: La Maldición del Quinto Partido (#8)
18	May 3, 2026	The Devil Wears Prada 2	$11,820,000	Hokum (#5), The Sheep Detectives (#6), Bem: Un Lémur en Fuga (#8)
19	May 10, 2026	The Devil Wears Prada 2	$4,636,000	Mortal Kombat II (#3), Billie Eilish – Hit Me Hard and Soft: The Tour (Live in 3D) (#5), Deseo (#7), El Ritual del Nahual (#9)
20	May 17, 2026	The Devil Wears Prada 2	$3,147,000	No Dejes a los Niños Solos (#4), In the Grey (#6), Obsession (#7), Top Gun: Maverick (#9), Top Gun: 40th Anniversary (#10)
21	May 24, 2026	Star Wars: The Mandalorian and Grogu	$3,930,000	Passenger (#4)
22	May 31, 2026	Backrooms	$6,613,380	Fuze (#6)
23	June 7, 2026	Scary Movie	$6,700,000	The Amazing Digital Circus: The Last Act (#3), Masters of the Universe (#4), Tuner (#9)
24	June 14, 2026	Disclosure Day	$4,158,685	BTS World Tour: 'Arirang' in Busan - Live Viewing (#2), Power Ballad (#10)
25	June 21, 2026	Toy Story 5	$25,863,000	Leviticus (#7)
26	June 28, 2026	Toy Story 5	$15,098,019	Supergirl (#2), Bleach: Thousand-Year Blood War - The Calamity (#7), Jackass: Best and Last (#9), Shell (#10)
27	July 5, 2026	Toy Story 5	$6,285,092	Minions & Monsters (#2), Nightborn (#7), Moscas (#9)
28	July 12, 2026	Toy Story 5	$4,770,000	Moana (#2), Evil Dead Burn (#4), The Invite (#5)
29	July 19, 2026	The Odyssey	$7,540,333	
30	July 26, 2026	The Odyssey	$7,539,050	Hasta el Fin del Mundo (#5), Deep Water (#6)
31	August 2, 2026	Spider-Man: Brand New Day	$38,300,000	Dead Man's Wire (#7)
32	August 9, 2026	Spider-Man: Brand New Day	$15,300,000	The Death of Robin Hood (#4), Pressure (#6), Saccharine (#7), ATEEZ Light the Way in Cinemas (#10)
33	August 16, 2026	Spider-Man: Brand New Day	$7,530,000	The End of Oak Street (#2), Paw Patrol: The Dino Movie (#4), Loco México Mágico (#5), 2026 Cortis Tour: Put Your Phone Down - Live Viewing (#6), LMD: Solo Las Más 2 (#8), Katseye: Wild Hearts (#9)
34	August 23, 2026	Insidious: Out of the Further	$4,200,000	Mutiny (#5), Trainspotting: 30th Anniversary (#9)
35	August 30, 2026	Coyote vs. Acme	$4,340,000	Juan Gabriel: Mi Primer Bellas Artes (#4), Harry Potter and the Philosopher's Stone: 25th Anniversary (#5), The Dog Stars (#6), One Night Only (#8)
36	September 6, 2026	Coyote vs. Acme	$3,775,000	Colony (#2), The Fast and the Furious: 25th Anniversary (#7), Gungo y los Juegos Cavernícolas (#8)
37	September 13, 2026	Coyote vs. Acme	$2,495,050	Practical Magic 2 (#2), Cars: 20th Anniversary (#3), El Club del Pie Izquierdo (#7), 30th French Cinema Tour (#9), Oasis: Don't Look Back in Anger (#10)
38	September 20, 2026	Resident Evil	$5,600,000	Forgotten Island (#4), Zoé: MEMOREX + REXSEXEX y Más (#7), One Piece: The Movie (#8), By Any Means (#10)
39	September 27, 2026	Avengers Endgame: Encore	$4,200,000	Heart of the Beast (#2), Fall 2: Deadpoint (#5), Coraline (#6), Mary and Max (#9)
40	October 4, 2026	Resident Evil	$2,145,240	Verity (#3), Digger (#4), Tad and the Magic Lamp (#5), Pinocchio Unstrung (#9)
41	October 11, 2026	Other Mommy	$1,950,500	Your Name: 10th Anniversary (#3), Hope (#7), Un Mal Partido (#8)
42	October 18, 2026	Street Fighter	$1,800,000	Pan's Labyrinth: 20th Anniversary (#3), Whalefall (#4), La Isla de las Muñecas (#7), Charlie the Wonderdog (#10)
43	October 25, 2026	La Venganza del Charro Negro	$5,035,000	BTS World Tour: 'Arirang' in Buenos Aires - Live Viewing (#2), Clayface (#3), The Social Reckoning (#6)
44	November 1, 2026	La Venganza del Charro Negro	$4,982,414	Wildwood (#4), Sense and Sensibility (#6), Runner (#7), Campeón Gabacho (#8)
45	November 8, 2026	Godzilla Minus Zero	$2,405,000	Stray Kids: World Tour ‘RUN IT’ LIVE VIEWING (#3), The Cat in the Hat (#4), Rammstein: Live in Mexico City (#5)
46	November 15, 2026	Ebenezer	$2,346,379	Petardos y Magnolias (#2), I Play Rocky (#5), Atrápelo Quien Pueda (#8), How to Rob a Bank (#10)

== Highest-grossing films ==
Highest-grossing films of 2026
Rank	Title	Distributor	Mex gross US$	Mex gross MX$
1.	Spider-Man: Brand New Day	Sony	$91,761,105	$1,564,055,499
2.	Toy Story 5	Disney	$80,989,156	$1,369,651,364
3.	The Super Mario Galaxy Movie	Universal	$68,089,009	$1,189,116,648
4.	The Odyssey	Universal	$38,522,743	$704,819,657
5.	Michael	Universal	$31,590,430	$555,055,533
6.	The Devil Wears Prada 2	20th Century	$29,484,000	$518,044,769
7.	Minions & Monsters	Universal	$19,300,200	$327,788,806
8.	Coyote vs. Acme	Zima	$17,294,824	$317,533,041
9.	Backrooms	Imagem Films	$17,920,725	$310,019,576
10.	Project Hail Mary	Sony	$15,233,002	$264,895,066

== See also ==
- List of Mexican films — Mexican films by year
- 2026 in Mexico

Preceded by 2025	Box office number-one films 2026	Succeeded by 2027
