= List of 2014 box office number-one films in Mexico =

This is a list of films which placed number one at the weekend box office for the year 2014.

== Number-one films ==
#	Date	Film	Gross (USD)	Openings in the top ten
1	January 5, 2014	Frozen	$2,441,278	Paranormal Activity: The Marked Ones (#2), Ender's Game (#5)
2	January 12, 2014	Frozen	$1,615,461	The Wolf of Wall Street (#3)
3	January 19, 2014	¿Qué le Dijiste a Dios?	$1,607,603	Jack Ryan: Shadow Recruit (#2), American Hustle (#4), The Book Thief (#7), Khumba (#9)
4	January 26, 2014	I, Frankenstein	$2,017,410	Grudge Match (#10)
5	February 2, 2014	47 Ronin	$1,916,620	Devil's Due (#2)
6	February 9, 2014	The Lego Movie	$3,823,198	The Legend of Hercules (#4), Thanks for Sharing (#8), Dallas Buyers Club (#10)
7	February 16, 2014	Cásese Quien Pueda	$3,287,643	RoboCop (#2), The Monuments Men (#4), Winter's Tale (#7)
8	February 23, 2014	Cásese Quien Pueda	$2,228,705	Pompeii (#3), 12 Years a Slave (#5), Saving Mr. Banks (#7)
9	March 2, 2014	Mr. Peabody & Sherman	$2,687,778	Fachon Models (#6), August: Osage County (#8), Lone Survivor (#10)
10	March 9, 2014	300: Rise of an Empire	$5,468,513	Homefront (#8), Zip & Zap and the Marble Gang (#10)
11	March 16, 2014	300: Rise of an Empire	$2,891,351	El Crimen del Cácaro Gumaro (#2), Need for Speed (#3), Tarzan (#4), Labor Day (#8)
12	March 23, 2014	Noah	$5,743,388	Muppets Most Wanted (#3)
13	March 30, 2014	Captain America: The Winter Soldier	$8,596,889	
14	April 6, 2014	Captain America: The Winter Soldier	$5,134,309	Divergent (#2), Ilusión Nacional (#5), God's Not Dead (#9)
15	April 13, 2014	Rio 2	$8,417,549	Son of God (#4), Stranger by the Lake (#9)
16	April 20, 2014	The Amazing Spider-Man 2: Rise of Electro	$8,018,030	Oculus (#6), Bears (#9), ¿Quién es Dayani Cristal? (#10)
17	April 27, 2014	The Amazing Spider-Man 2: Rise of Electro	$4,238,906	Tinker Bell and the Pirate Fairy (#3), Endless Love (#5), The Grand Budapest Hotel (#7), A Haunted House 2 (#8)
18	May 4, 2014	The Amazing Spider-Man 2: Rise of Electro	$2,274,492	Non-Stop (#2), The Other Woman (#4), Obediencia Perfecta (#5), Cesar Chavez (#6)
19	May 11, 2014	Non-Stop	$1,460,358	3 Days to Kill (#4), The Quiet Ones (#6)
20	May 19, 2014	Godzilla	$7,205,368	Nymphomaniac: Vol. I (#7), That Awkward Moment (#9)
21	May 25, 2014	X-Men: Days of Future Past	$9,387,633	Cambio de Ruta (#3)
22	June 1, 2014	Maleficent	$14,047,330	The Haunting in Connecticut 2 (#4), The Seducing Wolf (#10)
23	June 8, 2014	Maleficent	$8,638,259	The Fault in Our Stars (#2), Edge of Tomorrow (#3), Huérfanos (#9)
24	June 15, 2014	Maleficent	$4,807,720	A Million Ways to Die in the West (#5), I Hate Love (#6), Justin and the Knights of Valour (#8), The Best Offer (#9)
25	June 22, 2014	How to Train Your Dragon 2	$6,273,756	Transcendence (#4), The Railway Man (#8)
26	June 29, 2014	How to Train Your Dragon 2	$3,473,419	Blended (#2), Nothing Left to Fear (#7), Heaven is for Real (#8), Brick Mansions (#9)
27	July 6, 2014	Transformers: Age of Extinction (3D Preview)	$3,326,309	Neighbors (#4), Paraíso (#7), El Inventor de Juegos (#9)
28	July 13, 2014	Transformers: Age of Extinction	$8,264,391	Chef (#7)
29	July 20, 2014	Transformers: Age of Extinction	$4,751,500	Dawn of the Planet of the Apes (3D Preview) (#2), Planes: Fire & Rescue (#3), 5 Bravo (#7), Fading Gigolo (#8), Jersey Boys (#10)
30	July 27, 2014	Dawn of the Planet of the Apes	$6,902,131	One Chance (#7), The Devil's Violinist (#8)
31	August 3, 2014	Guardians of the Galaxy	$6,747,444	And So It Goes (#4), The Purge: Anarchy (#5), Minuscule: Valley of the Lost Ants (#8)
32	August 10, 2014	Teenage Mutant Ninja Turtles	$5,955,988	Sex Tape (#3), Mr. Morgan's Last Love (#9)
33	August 17, 2014	Teenage Mutant Ninja Turtles	$3,119,339	The Expendables 3 (#2), Más Negro Que la Noche (#3), What If (#7), Million Dollar Arm (#10)
34	August 24, 2014	Hercules	$3,822,452	Guten Tag, Ramón (#4), The Nut Job (#7), Casi Treinta (#9)
35	August 31, 2014	Lucy	$3,741,448	If I Stay (#4), 22 Jump Street (#8)
36	September 7, 2014	Into the Storm	$3,359,672	Amor de mis amores (#4)
37	September 14, 2014	The Maze Runner	$2,397,481	The Boxtrolls (#3), Deliver Us From Evil (#5)
38	September 21, 2014	Cantinflas	$3,075,686	A Walk Among the Tombstones (#7), As Above, So Below (#8)
39	September 28, 2014	Cantinflas	$1,670,560	The Equalizer (#2), Saint Seiya: Legend of Sanctuary (#4), The Giver (#7)
40	October 5, 2014	Dracula Untold	$4,248,016	Gone Girl (#2)
41	October 12, 2014	Dracula Untold	$2,782,183	Alexander and the Terrible, Horrible, No Good, Very Bad Day (#2), One Direction: Where We Are (#4), The November Man (#7), Begin Again (#9)
42	October 13, 2014	La Dictadura Perfecta	$3,515,268	The Book of Life (#2)
43	October 26, 2014	Annabelle	$7,613,891	The Judge (#4), Magic in the Moonlight (#8)
44	November 2, 2014	Annabelle	$2,878,183	La Leyenda de las Momias de Guanajuato (#2), John Wick (#5), Rage (#8)
45	November 9, 2014	Interstellar	$2,774,033	Sin City: A Dame to Kill For (#8)
46	November 16, 2014	Big Hero 6	$4,850,176	Dumb and Dumber To (#3), Birdman (#4), Quiero Ser Fiel (#10)
47	November 23, 2014	The Hunger Games: Mockingjay – Part 1	$12,108,958	
48	November 30, 2014	The Hunger Games: Mockingjay – Part 1	$4,170,891	Horrible Bosses 2 (#3), Paddington (#4), REC 4: Apocalypse (#5), Left Behind (#7)
49	December 7, 2014	Exodus: Gods and Kings	$4,708,600	Haunter (#8)
50	December 14, 2014	The Hobbit: The Battle of the Five Armies	$6,465,817	Mary's Land (#8)
51	December 21, 2014	Penguins of Madagascar	$4,858,987	Visitantes (#4), Horns (#7)
52	December 28, 2014	Night at the Museum: Secret of the Tomb	$5,856,154	The Best of Me (#6), St. Vincent (#7), The Drop (#10)

== Highest-grossing films ==
Highest-grossing films of 2014
Rank	Title	Distributor	Gross (USD)
1.	Maleficent	Disney	$46,172,590
2.	Transformers: Age of Extinction	Paramount	$33,534,598
3.	Rio 2	20th Century Fox	$30,905,962
4.	The Amazing Spider-Man 2: Rise of Electro	Sony	$28,460,534
5.	Captain America: The Winter Soldier	Disney	$25,720,282
6.	X-Men: Days of Future Past	20th Century Fox	$24,581,963
7.	Dawn of the Planet of the Apes	20th Century Fox	$24,579,285
8.	The Hunger Games: Mockingjay – Part 1	Videocine	$23,729,251
9.	How to Train Your Dragon 2	20th Century Fox	$19,941,262
10.	Guardians of the Galaxy	Disney	$19,648,542

== See also ==
- List of Mexican films — Mexican films by year

Preceded by 2013	Box office number-one films of Mexico; 2014	Succeeded by 2015
