= List of 2015 box office number-one films in Mexico =

This is a list of films which placed number one at the weekend box office for the year 2015.

== Number-one films ==
#	Date	Film	Gross (USD)	Openings in the top ten
1	January 4, 2015	Night at the Museum: Secret of the Tomb	$3,905,909	Fury (#3), Gloria (#5), Good People (#8)
2	January 11, 2015	Ouija	$2,369,437	The Gambler (#4), Let's Be Cops (#5), The Theory of Everything (#6)
3	January 18, 2015	Seventh Son	$2,285,754	Escobar: Paradise Lost (#4), Tinker Bell and the Legend of the NeverBeast (#5)
4	January 25, 2015	The Woman in Black: Angel of Death	$1,791,311	Beauty and the Beast (#3), Annie (#4)
5	February 1, 2015	The SpongeBob Movie: Sponge Out of Water	$4,793,759	Taken 3 (#2), Unbroken (#4)
6	February 8, 2015	The SpongeBob Movie: Sponge Out of Water	$2,298,980	Jupiter Ascending (#3), Into the Woods (#4), The Imitation Game (#5)
7	February 15, 2015	Fifty Shades of Grey	$5,495,154	The Possession of Michael King (#6), Malaventura (#7), Selma (#9)
8	February 22, 2015	American Sniper	$2,371,505	The Cobbler (#5), Tiempos Felices (#7), Still Alice (#10)
9	March 1, 2015	A La Mala	$2,062,100	Kingsman: The Secret Service (#2), Jessabelle (#8)
10	March 8, 2015	Focus	$2,261,870	Project Almanac (#5),
11	March 15, 2015	Cinderella	$4,832,964	Chappie (#3)
12	March 22, 2015	The Divergent Series: Insurgent	$3,448,249	The Boy Next Door (#4), Do You Believe? (#7)
13	March 29, 2015	Home	$2,815,070	The Lazarus Effect (#4)
14	April 5, 2015	Fast & Furious 7	$14,344,048	
15	April 12, 2015	Fast & Furious 7	$7,538,992	Guardianes de Oz (#3), The Longest Ride (#4), Out of the Dark (#5), Kill the Messenger (#10)
16	April 19, 2015	Fast & Furious 7	$3,741,440	Paul Blart: Mall Cop 2 (#2), Run All Night (#3), Love, Rosie (#5)
17	April 26, 2015	Fast & Furious 7	$1,817,730	Mortdecai (#5), Child 44 (#9), 5 to 7 (#10)
18	May 3, 2015	Avengers: Age of Ultron	$18,689,287	The Salt of the Earth (#8)
19	May 10, 2015	Avengers: Age of Ultron	$5,880,114	The Age of Adaline (#2), The Second Best Exotic Marigold Hotel (#6)
20	May 17, 2015	Avengers: Age of Ultron	$4,019,406	Mad Max: Fury Road (#2), Little Boy (#3), The Loft (#6)
21	May 24, 2015	Tomorrowland	$2,579,513	The Water Diviner (#5), Clown (#6)
22	May 31, 2015	San Andreas	$10,120,651	Una Última y Nos Vamos (#6), The House of Magic (#7)
23	June 7, 2015	San Andreas	$6,638,270	Spy (#2), Beyond the Reach (#8) Dark Places (#9)
24	June 14, 2015	Jurassic World	$13,777,511	5 Flights Up (#6)
25	June 21, 2015	Inside Out	$8,617,430	Dragon Ball Z: Resurrection 'F' (#3), Les Invincibles (#9)
26	June 28, 2015	Inside Out	$6,025,117	Poltergeist (#3), Insidious: Chapter 3 (#4), Hot Pursuit (#6), Terminator Genisys 3D (#7), The Gunman (#9)
27	July 5, 2015	Terminator Genisys	$4,822,989	Woman in Gold (#9), Cartel Land (#10)
28	July 12, 2015	Minions	$15,861,872	
29	July 19, 2015	Minions	$6,454,858	Ant-Man (#2), The Gallows (#3), Playing It Cool (#7), A Little Chaos (#8)
30	July 26, 2015	Pixels	$3,594,357	Paper Towns (#4), It Follows (#7), Self/less (#10)
31	August 2, 2015	Mission: Impossible – Rogue Nation	$4,140,091	Ooops! Noah is Gone... (#6), Danny Collins (#9)
32	August 9, 2015	Fantastic Four	$4,170,582	The Vatican Tapes (#4), Pitch Perfect 2 (#7)
33	August 16, 2015	Fantastic Four	$1,695,411	Vacation (#2), Unfriended (#5), Elvira, Te Daría Mi Vida Pero la Estoy Usando (#7), Southpaw (#8)
34	August 23, 2015	Un Gallo con Muchos Huevos	$2,839,447	Hitman: Agent 47 (#3), Demonic (#4), She's Funny That Way (#8)
35	August 30, 2015	Un Gallo con Muchos Huevos	$1,707,407	Ted 2 (#2), The 33 (#3), Grace of Monaco (#9)
36	September 6, 2015	Un Gallo con Muchos Huevos	$1,207,658	The Man from U.N.C.L.E. (#2), Sinister 2 (#4), Shaun the Sheep Movie (#7), Some Kind of Beautiful (#8)
37	September 13, 2015	Maze Runner: The Scorch Trials	$3,267,364	Ella es Ramona (#7), The Seventh Dwarf (#8), Knock Knock (#9)
38	September 20, 2015	Everest	$2,754,301	The Gift (#4), Por Mis Bigotes (#5), Magic Mike XXL (#10)
39	September 27, 2015	Hotel Transylvania 2	$7,856,583	No Escape (#4), The Visit (#5)
40	October 4, 2015	Hotel Transylvania 2	$4,649,297	The Martian (#2), The Intern (#3), Ilusiones S.A. (#8), Snowpiercer (#9)
41	October 11, 2015	Pan	$2,923,608	The Transporter Refueled (#5), Straight Outta Compton (#6)
42	October 18, 2015	Hotel Transylvania 2	$1,769,045	The Walk (#5), Mexican Gangster (#7), Trainwreck (#8)
43	October 25, 2015	Goosebumps	$2,928,764	Paranormal Activity: The Ghost Dimension (#2), Bridge of Spies (#4), Back to the Future Trilogy (#8)
44	November 1, 2015	Crimson Peak	$1,825,771	Don Gato: El Inicio de la Pandilla (#3), The Last Witch Hunter (#4), Sicario (#6)
45	November 8, 2015	Spectre	$4,415,358	The Hallow (#6)
46	November 15, 2015	Spectre	$2,229,022	The Little Prince (#2), Heist (#5), Scouts Guide to the Zombie Apocalypse (#6), Ladrones (#9), The Forger (#10)
47	November 22, 2015	The Hunger Games: Mockingjay – Part 2	$9,013,014	Black Mass (#4)
48	November 29, 2015	The Good Dinosaur	$3,461,780	Victor Frankenstein (#3), A Walk in the Woods (#6), Macbeth (#10)
49	December 6, 2015	The Good Dinosaur	$2,102,498	In the Heart of the Sea (#2), Gallows Hill (#6), Love the Coopers (#7), 600 Miles (#8), Suite Française (#10)
50	December 13, 2015	The Good Dinosaur	$1,491,676	Secret in Their Eyes (#5), Krampus (#6), Ghoul (#10)
51	December 20, 2015	Star Wars: The Force Awakens	$11,913,564	El Clan (#9)
52	December 27, 2015	Star Wars: The Force Awakens	$4,811,393	The Peanuts Movie (#2), Miss You Already (#5), Steve Jobs (#8)

== Highest-grossing films ==
Highest-grossing films of 2015
Rank	Title	Distributor	Mex gross US$	Mex gross MX$
1.	Avengers: Age of Ultron	Disney	$51,089,720	$783,920,666
2.	Fast & Furious 7	Universal	$50,924,598	$778,713,486
3.	Minions	Universal	$43,910,109	$767,148,269
4.	Jurassic World	Universal	$42,105,404	$747,588,219
5.	Inside Out	Disney	$31,100,000	$633,681,159
6.	San Andreas	Warner Bros.	$28,857,752	$472,271,540
7.	Star Wars: The Force Awakens	Disney	$27,649,496	$525,451,022
8.	Hotel Transylvania 2	Sony	$23,925,697	$406,569,352
9.	The Hunger Games: Mockingjay – Part 2	Videocine	$20,156,285	$367,739,386
10.	Cinderella	Disney	$15,486,930	$315,555,490

== See also ==
- List of Mexican films — Mexican films by year

Preceded by 2014	Box office number-one films of Mexico; 2015	Succeeded by 2016
