= List of 2019 box office number-one films in Mexico =

This is a list of films which placed number one at the weekend box office for the year 2019.

== Number-one films ==
#	Date	Film	Gross (USD)	Openings in the top ten
1	January 6, 2019	Aquaman	$1,978,768	Creed II (#2), Mortal Engines (#5), Once Upon a Deadpool (#10)
2	January 13, 2019	Dragon Ball Super: Broly	$6,452,094	Second Act (#2), Belzebuth (#5), Charming (#9)
3	January 20, 2019	Glass	$4,154,438	A Dog's Way Home (#3), The Upside (#8), BlacKkKlansman (#10)
4	January 27, 2019	Mirreyes contra Godínez	$3,439,068	How to Train Your Dragon: The Hidden World (3D Preview) (#3), The Mule (#4), The Mermaid (#6)
5	February 3, 2019	How to Train Your Dragon: The Hidden World	$6,194,441	The Favourite (#6), Vice (#7), Pyewacket (#10)
6	February 10, 2019	How to Train Your Dragon: The Hidden World	$3,316,563	Escape Room (#3), Alita: Battle Angel (3D Preview) (#4), Green Book (#5), Final Score (#7)
7	February 17, 2019	Alita: Battle Angel	$2,755,731	My Best Friend's Wedding (#2), The Lego Movie 2: The Second Part (#4)
8	February 24, 2019	Cold Pursuit	$1,405,081	#LadyRancho (#4), The Prodigy (#7), Mia and the White Lion (#9)
9	March 3, 2019	Happy Death Day 2U	$1,155,801	Serenity (#7)
10	March 10, 2019	Captain Marvel	$12,812,530	Beautiful Boy (#8)
11	March 17, 2019	Captain Marvel	$6,407,025	En Las Buenas y las Malas (#2), Como Novio de Pueblo (#3), The Hole in the Ground (#4), Manou the Swift (#5), The Professor and the Madman (#7), The Lullaby (#9)
12	March 24, 2019	Captain Marvel	$2,825,710	The Quake (#2), Five Feet Apart (#3), Fighting with My Family (#6), Las Niñas Bien (#7), Ben Is Back (#8)
13	March 31, 2019	Dumbo	$7,613,793	Heilstätten (#5), Mary Queen of Scots (#7)
14	April 7, 2019	Shazam!	$5,851,449	Pet Sematary (#3), On the Basis of Sex (#8), The Extraordinary Journey of the Fakir (#9)
15	April 14, 2019	No Manches Frida 2	$4,649,576	Wonder Park (#4), After (#6), Hellboy (#7), The Kid Who Would Be King (#8), Amoureux de Ma Femme (#10)
16	April 21, 2019	The Curse of La Llorona	$3,765,912	El Complot Mongol (#6), Breakthrough (#7)
17	April 28, 2019	Avengers: Endgame	$31,905,293	The Old Man & the Gun (#9)
18	May 5, 2019	Avengers: Endgame	$10,688,838	Us (#2), Long Shot (#4), Air Strike (#6), Spy Cat (#8)
19	May 12, 2019	Avengers: Endgame	$4,297,244	Pokémon Detective Pikachu (#2), Dulce Familia (#3), What They Had (#8), He's Out There (#10)
20	May 19, 2019	Pokémon Detective Pikachu	$2,253,545	John Wick: Chapter 3 – Parabellum (#3), A Dog's Journey (#4), Brightburn (#6), UglyDolls (#7), The Aftermath (#9)
21	May 26, 2019	Aladdin	$8,913,265	Just a Breath Away (#9), The Sun Is Also a Star (#10)
22	June 2, 2019	Aladdin	$6,102,831	Godzilla: King of the Monsters (#2), Rocketman (#4), Ma (#5)
23	June 9, 2019	Dark Phoenix	$4,777,000	Solteras (#4), The Queen's Corgi (#5)
24	June 16, 2019	Men in Black: International	$3,924,232	Greta (#6), Deadly Still (#10)
25	June 23, 2019	Toy Story 4	$23,812,010	Hotel Mumbai (#6), I Still See You (#10)
26	June 30, 2019	Toy Story 4	$12,731,416	Annabelle Comes Home (#2), The Hustle (#3), Chicuarotes (#6)
27	July 7, 2019	Spider-Man: Far From Home	$10,386,486	Pain and Glory (#6)
28	July 14, 2019	Spider-Man: Far From Home	$5,147,280	Child's Play (#3), Poms (#6), The Adventures of Jurassic Pet (#7)
29	July 21, 2019	The Lion King	$18,415,933	El Cuento de las Comadrejas (#9)
30	July 28, 2019	The Lion King	$8,215,092	Extremely Wicked, Shockingly Evil and Vile (#2), ¿Conoces a Tomás? (#5), The Golem (#8), Stuber (#9)
31	August 4, 2019	Hobbs & Shaw	$6,470,918	PAW Patrol: Mighty Pups! (#5), La Camarista (#8), Pulp Fiction: 25th Anniversary (#9)
32	August 11, 2019	The Secret Life of Pets 2	$4,955,982	Crawl (#4), Bring the Soul: The Movie (#5), Redcon-1 (#7)
33	August 18, 2019	Scary Stories to Tell in the Dark	$2,885,938	Mentada de Padre (#4), Playmobil: The Movie (#7), Booksmart (#9), L'homme fidèle (#10)
34	August 25, 2019	Once Upon a Time in Hollywood	$2,365,092	The Art of Racing in the Rain (#4), Locos por la Herencia (#10)
35	September 1, 2019	Angel Has Fallen	$1,635,982	Yesterday (#3), Como Si Fuera la Primera Vez (#6)
36	September 8, 2019	It Chapter Two	$9,145,982	The Angry Birds Movie 2 (#2), Sonora (#10)
37	September 15, 2019	It Chapter Two	$3,265,857	Dora and the Lost City of Gold (#2), Mamá Se Fue de Viaje (#3), Kursk (#5), Red Joan (#8), Otryv (#9)
38	September 22, 2019	Tod@s Caen	$2,495,642	Ad Astra (#4), Rambo: Last Blood (#5), Midsommar (#8), Overcomer (#10)
39	September 29, 2019	Abominable	$2,025,310	Ready or Not (#6), Todas las Pecas del Mundo (#8), Anna (#9)
40	October 6, 2019	Joker	$13,485,934	108 Costuras (#5), Nothing to Lose 2 (#7), Where'd You Go, Bernadette (#10)
41	October 13, 2019	Joker	$8,395,942	Gemini Man (#2), La Boda de la Abuela (#4), Good Boys (#5), After the Wedding (#6), Mercy Black (#8)
42	October 20, 2019	Maleficent: Mistress of Evil	$7,625,831	47 Meters Down: Uncaged (#5), Late Night (#7)
43	October 27, 2019	Maleficent: Mistress of Evil	$4,166,098	The Addams Family (#2), Zombieland: Double Tap (#4), Hustlers (#5), Un Papá Pirata (#7), Unplanned (#8)
44	November 3, 2019	Terminator: Dark Fate	$2,625,885	Día de Muertos (#4), Los Rodríguez y el Más Allá (#8), Downton Abbey (#9)
45	November 10, 2019	Maleficent: Mistress of Evil	$1,700,753	Doctor Sleep (#2), Playing with Fire (#4), Polvo (#8)
46	November 17, 2019	Maleficent: Mistress of Evil	$1,204,122	Ford v Ferrari (#2), Placa de Acero (#8)
47	November 24, 2019	Frozen 2	$8,629,125	
48	December 1, 2019	Frozen 2	$5,098,736	Guadalupe Reyes (#2), Mary (#5), Killerman (#6), A Rainy Day in New York (#7)
49	December 8, 2019	Frozen 2	$2,815,849	Last Christmas (#2), Knives Out (#3), 21 Bridges (#5), Cats and Peachtopia (#8)
50	December 15, 2019	Jumanji: The Next Level	$4,526,878	Official Secrets (#8)
51	December 22, 2019	Star Wars: The Rise of Skywalker	$7,252,312	Doblemente Embarazada (#4), The Good Liar (#5), Black Christmas (#7)
52	December 29, 2019	Star Wars: The Rise of Skywalker	$2,194,082	Spies in Disguise (#3), El Hubiera Sí Existe (#4), Cats (#6), Parasite (#7), Jexi (#10)

== Highest-grossing films ==
Highest-grossing films of 2019
Rank	Title	Distributor	Mex gross US$	Mex gross MX$
1.	Avengers: Endgame	Disney	$77,594,943	$1,473,104,518
2.	Toy Story 4	Disney	$71,882,369	$1,374,646,396
3.	The Lion King	Disney	$51,832,021	$993,208,526
4.	Joker	Warner Bros.	$43,900,000	$845,648,883
5.	Captain Marvel	Disney	$33,314,134	$635,936,439
6.	Aladdin	Disney	$32,507,722	$624,795,468
7.	Spider-Man: Far From Home	Sony	$32,298,318	$631,674,354
8.	Frozen 2	Disney	$28,828,184	$552,854,532
9.	Maleficent: Mistress of Evil	Disney	$26,113,258	$498,772,917
10.	It Chapter Two	Warner Bros.	$21,750,818	$424,908,596

== See also ==
- List of Mexican films — Mexican films by year

Preceded by 2018	Box office number-one films of Mexico; 2019	Succeeded by 2020
