= List of 2018 box office number-one films in Mexico =

This is a list of films which placed number one at the weekend box office for the year 2018.

== Number-one films ==
#	Date	Film	Gross (USD)	Openings in the top ten
1	January 7, 2018	Insidious: The Last Key	$2,988,153	Tad Jones: The Hero Returns (#5), Stronger (#9)
2	January 14, 2018	The Shape of Water	$3,348,084	Una Mujer sin Filtro (#2), Inside (#10)
3	January 21, 2018	The Shape of Water	$2,035,448	The Commuter (#2), La Leyenda del Charro Negro (#3), Downsizing (#5)
4	January 28, 2018	The Shape of Water	$1,830,105	Lo Más Sencillo es Complicarlo Todo (#4), Woody Woodpecker (#5), Molly's Game (#9), Three Billboards Outside Ebbing, Missouri (#10)
5	February 4, 2018	Maze Runner: The Death Cure	$3,093,302	The Little Vampire 3D (#3), Call Me by Your Name (#10)
6	February 11, 2018	Fifty Shades Freed	$2,727,505	La Boda de Valentina (#2), Paddington 2 (#4), The 15:17 to Paris (#7)
7	February 18, 2018	Black Panther	$9,207,156	All the Money in the World (#4), Lady Bird (#8)
8	February 25, 2018	Black Panther	$5,046,780	Cómplices (#2), Den of Thieves (#5), The Midnight Man (#6), Early Man (#7), I, Tonya (#9)
9	March 4, 2018	Black Panther	$2,884,350	Red Sparrow (#2), Satan's Slaves (#6), Father Figures (#7)
10	March 11, 2018	Black Panther	$1,594,664	Winchester (#2), Marcianos vs. Mexicanos (#4), Death Wish (#6), 12 Strong (#9), Épouse-moi Mon Pote (#10)
11	March 18, 2018	Tomb Raider	$2,166,923	Peter Rabbit (#2), Todo Mal (#5), Based on a True Story (#9)
12	March 25, 2018	Pacific Rim Uprising	$4,415,729	Tuya, Mía... Te la Apuesto (#5), Mary Magdalene (#8), L'Amant Double (#10)
13	April 1, 2018	Ready Player One	$2,989,902	Hasta que la Boda nos Separe (#3), A Wrinkle in Time (#4), Sherlock Gnomes (#5)
14	April 8, 2018	A Quiet Place	$2,683,042	The Hurricane Heist (#3), Mazinger Z: Infinity (#4), Game Night (#7), La 4ª Compañía (#10)
15	April 15, 2018	Rampage	$4,932,196	Love, Simon (#3), Ploey: You Never Fly Alone (#6)
16	April 22, 2018	Rampage	$3,005,969	Truth or Dare (#2), Gnome Alone (#6)
17	April 29, 2018	Avengers: Infinity War	$25,382,566	L'un Dans L'autre (#8)
18	May 6, 2018	Avengers: Infinity War	$8,665,742	The Strangers: Prey at Night (#2), 24 Hours to Live (#3), Paul, Apostle of Christ (#6), Isle of Dogs (#7)
19	May 13, 2018	Overboard	$11,213,179	Nada a Perder (#4), The Ritual (#6), Tully (#9), Slumber (#10)
20	May 20, 2018	Deadpool 2	$8,798,335	The Fixies (#4), Campeones (#5), Gringo (#7)
21	May 27, 2018	Deadpool 2	$3,572,786	Solo: A Star Wars Story (#2), Blockers (#5), Midnight Sun (#6), Book Club (#7), El Ángel en el Reloj (#8), You Were Never Really Here (#9)
22	June 3, 2018	Deadpool 2	$1,804,831	I Feel Pretty (#4), The Crucifixion (#6), Eres mi Pasión (#7), The Little Witch (#9)
23	June 10, 2018	Ocean's 8	$2,445,381	Hereditary (#2)
24	June 17, 2018	Incredibles 2	$12,097,243	El Habitante (#3), Madame (#7)
25	June 24, 2018	Jurassic World: Fallen Kingdom	$10,311,092	How to Talk to Girls at Parties (#10)
26	July 1, 2018	Jurassic World: Fallen Kingdom	$6,214,842	A Tí Te Quería Encontrar (#3), Sicario: Day of the Soldado (#4), Life of the Party (#5), The Mimic (#7), Mission Kathmandu: The Adventures of Nelly & Simon (#8)
27	July 8, 2018	Ant-Man and the Wasp	$6,753,487	Still/Born (#5), Happy End (#9), Locos de Amor (#10)
28	July 15, 2018	Hotel Transylvania 3: A Monster Vacation	$7,173,180	Skyscraper (#2), Ghostland (#6), Cigarettes et Chocolat Chaud (#9)
29	July 22, 2018	Hotel Transylvania 3: A Monster Vacation	$3,964,454	The First Purge (#2), Adrift (#6), Tag (#8), Attack on Titan: The Roar of Awakening (#10)
30	July 29, 2018	Mission: Impossible – Fallout	$4,929,785	Más Sabe el Diablo por Viejo (#4). Here Comes the Grump (#6), Wildling (#10)
31	August 5, 2018	Ya Veremos	$3,289,516	Christopher Robin (#3), The Darkest Minds (#5)
32	August 12, 2018	The Meg	$6,307,774	Loving Pablo (#6), Luis and His Friends from Outer Space (#7), Bad Samaritan (#9)
33	August 19, 2018	The Meg	$3,723,016	The Equalizer 2 (#2), Mamma Mia! Here We Go Again (#3), Plan V (#6), Ghost Stories (#10)
34	August 26, 2018	The Meg	$2,263,221	Slender Man (#2), Teen Titans Go! To the Movies (#3), The Spy Who Dumped Me (#4), Grease: 40th Anniversary (#9)
35	September 2, 2018	Alpha	$1,772,061	Mile 22 (#3), Ana y Bruno (#6), Tiempo Compartido (#10)
36	September 9, 2018	The Nun	$10,354,752	The Little Mermaid (#3)
37	September 16, 2018	The Nun	$3,390,898	Johnny English Strikes Again (#2), El Día de la Unión (#5), Gotti (#6)
38	September 23, 2018	The Predator	$3,268,543	The Stolen Princess (#5), Crazy Rich Asians (#6), Malacopa (#7), Searching (#9), A Simple Favor (#10)
39	September 30, 2018	Smallfoot	$3,474,892	Papillon (#5), Recuperando a mi Ex (#6), Hotel Artemis (#8)
40	October 7, 2018	Venom	$10,067,272	La Gran Promesa (#8), Ravenous (#9)
41	October 14, 2018	Venom	$4,471,095	Goosebumps 2: Haunted Halloween (#2), A Star Is Born (#3), Te Juro Que Yo No Fui (#5), Ni Tú Ni Yo (#6), Bleeding Steel (#7)
42	October 21, 2018	Halloween	$5,021,190	Si Yo Fuera Tú (#5), Cinderella and the Secret Prince (#8)
43	October 28, 2018	Halloween	$2,364,505	The House with a Clock in Its Walls (#2), Coco (#3), Museo (#5), Replicas (#8)
44	November 4, 2018	Bohemian Rhapsody	$5,679,029	The Nutcracker and the Four Realms (#2), Inquilinos (#5), Hunter Killer (#6), Silencio (#10)
45	November 11, 2018	Bohemian Rhapsody	$4,030,817	The Girl in the Spider's Web (#3), Overlord (#4), First Man (#5), Lino: The Movie (#7)
46	November 18, 2018	Fantastic Beasts: The Crimes of Grindelwald	$6,119,028	Loca por el Trabajo (#3)
47	November 25, 2018	Ralph Breaks the Internet	$6,167,792	Peppermint (#4), Instant Family (#6), Gonjiam: Haunted Asylum (#7), Chivas: La Película (#9), The Kindergarten Teacher (#10)
48	December 2, 2018	Ralph Breaks the Internet	$4,064,392	Robin Hood (#3), The Possession of Hannah Grace (#4), Widows (#7), My Hero Academia: Two Heroes (#8)
49	December 9, 2018	The Grinch	$5,447,527	Mi Pequeño Gran Hombre (#3), Hell Fest (#7)
50	December 16, 2018	Aquaman	$6,643,640	211 (#7), Unfriended: Dark Web (#9)
51	December 23, 2018	Aquaman	$3,922,942	Bumblebee (#2), Life Itself (#4)
52	December 30, 2018	Aquaman	$3,251,995	Spider-Man: Into the Spider-Verse (#2), Perfectos Desconocidos (#4),Mary Poppins Returns (#6), Muse (#7), Monsieur Je-Sais-Tout (#10)

== Highest-grossing films ==
Highest-grossing films of 2018
Rank	Title	Distributor	Mex gross US$	Mex gross MX$
1.	Avengers: Infinity War	Disney	$60,058,771	$1,137,183,315
2.	Incredibles 2	Disney	$38,769,472	$775,421,646
3.	Jurassic World: Fallen Kingdom	Universal	$35,176,901	$740,401,252
4.	Aquaman	Warner Bros.	$31,894,332	$605,606,150
5.	Black Panther	Disney	$28,322,788	$520,500,093
6.	Hotel Transylvania 3: A Monster Vacation	Sony	$26,698,012	$518,982,266
7.	Overboard	Videocine	$26,170,477	$544,988,012
8.	Venom	Sony	$24,411,915	$495,057,730
9.	The Nun	Warner Bros.	$22,396,226	$421,674,074
10.	Deadpool 2	20th Century Fox	$21,699,145	$414,442,133

== See also ==
- List of Mexican films — Mexican films by year

Preceded by 2017	Box office number-one films of Mexico; 2018	Succeeded by 2019
