= List of 2023 box office number-one films in Mexico =

This is a list of films which placed number one at the weekend box office in Mexico for the year 2023.

== Number-one films ==
#	Date	Film	Gross (USD)	Openings in the top ten
1	January 8, 2023	Avatar: The Way of Water	$8,069,100	Operation Fortune: Ruse de Guerre (#5), The Perilous Internet Ring (#6), She Said (#10)
2	January 15, 2023	Avatar: The Way of Water	$4,331,668	Plane (#5), Terrifier 2 (#6), Rock Dog 3: Battle of the Beat (#9)
3	January 22, 2023	Puss in Boots: The Last Wish	$3,435,661	Babylon (#5), Jack In The Box: The Awakening (#8)
4	January 29, 2023	Puss in Boots: The Last Wish	$3,005,218	Infelices para siempre (#3), Winnie-the-Pooh: Blood and Honey (#6), The Fabelmans (#9)
5	February 5, 2023	Puss in Boots: The Last Wish	$2,049,462	Knock at the Cabin (#4), The Amazing Maurice (#8), Daddy Daughter Trip (#10)
6	February 12, 2023	Puss in Boots: The Last Wish	$1,905,021	The Whale (#2), Titanic: 25th Anniversary (#4), La Niña de la Comunión (#7)
7	February 19, 2023	Ant-Man and the Wasp: Quantumania	$9,118,700	Till (#10)
8	February 26, 2023	Ant-Man and the Wasp: Quantumania	$4,758,509	Momias (#4), Huesera: The Bone Woman (#5), Maybe I Do (#6), The Quintessential Quintuplets Movie (#8), Missing (#9)
9	March 5, 2023	Creed III	$3,168,680	Nada que Ver (#7), The Dark and the Wicked (#9)
10	March 12, 2023	Demon Slayer: To the Swordsmith Village	$3,490,967	Scream VI (#2), 65 (#4), Die Häschenschule (#8)
11	March 19, 2023	Shazam! Fury of the Gods	$4,280,654	Cocaine Bear (#7), 13 Exorcismos (#9)
12	March 26, 2023	John Wick: Chapter 4	$4,774,851	¡Que Viva México! (#3), All of Those Voices (#7)
13	April 2, 2023	John Wick: Chapter 4	$4,180,588	Dungeons & Dragons: Honor Among Thieves (#2), Marlowe (#8), Sword Art Online Progressive: Scherzo of Deep Night (#9)
14	April 9, 2023	The Super Mario Bros. Movie	$28,006,617	The Pope's Exorcist (#3), Air (#5)
15	April 16, 2023	The Super Mario Bros. Movie	$25,925,684	Suzume (#5), La Usurpadora: The Musical (#7), Dead Bride (#8), Beautiful Disaster (#10)
16	April 23, 2023	The Super Mario Bros. Movie	$11,928,165	Evil Dead Rise (#2), Les Trois Mousquetaires : D'Artagnan (#4)
17	April 30, 2023	The Super Mario Bros. Movie	$9,245,952	Knights of the Zodiac (#3), Renfield (#5), Bed Rest (#8), Mafia Mamma (#9), Los Habitantes (#10)
18	May 7, 2023	Guardians of the Galaxy Vol. 3	$13,864,750	
19	May 14, 2023	Guardians of the Galaxy Vol. 3	$11,448,673	¿Cómo matar a mamá? (#3), The Offering (#5), Love Again (#6), Panama (#8), Mirando al Cielo (#9), Goodbye Monster (#10)
20	May 21, 2023	Fast & Furious X	$16,837,470	Titanic 666 (#10)
21	May 28, 2023	Fast & Furious X	$11,524,530	The Little Mermaid (#2), Demonio Negro (#5)
22	June 4, 2023	Spider-Man: Across the Spider-Verse	$11,743,630	The Boogeyman (#5), Book Club: The Next Chapter (#6), Les Traducteurs (#9)
23	June 11, 2023	Spider-Man: Across the Spider-Verse	$8,329,278	Transformers: Rise of the Beasts (#2), Sadako DX (#7), One True Loves (#10)
24	June 18, 2023	The Flash	$8,736,818	Asteroid City (#8), SUGA: Road to D-DAY (#9), j-hope IN THE BOX (#10)
25	June 25, 2023	The Flash	$5,817,992	Elemental (#2), No Hard Feelings (#5), Post Mortem (#9)
26	July 2, 2023	Elemental	$5,220,696	Indiana Jones and the Dial of Destiny (#3), Ruby Gillman, Teenage Kraken (#6), About My Father (#9)
27	July 9, 2023	Insidious: The Red Door	$6,557,962	Misanthrope (#9)
28	July 16, 2023	Insidious: The Red Door	$4,375,361	Mission: Impossible – Dead Reckoning Part One (#2)
29	July 23, 2023	Barbie	$23,174,115	Oppenheimer (#2)
30	July 30, 2023	Barbie	$18,535,590	Haunted Mansion (#4), Kandahar (#7), Consecration (#8), The First Slam Dunk (#9)
31	August 6, 2023	Meg 2: The Trench	$7,986,525	Cats in the Museum (#10)
32	August 13, 2023	Meg 2: The Trench	$6,764,559	Teenage Mutant Ninja Turtles: Mutant Mayhem (#3), Talk to Me (#5)
33	August 20, 2023	Meg 2: The Trench	$3,383,769	Blue Beetle (#2), The Last Voyage of the Demeter (#7), His Only Son (#9)
34	August 27, 2023	Gran Turismo	$2,483,139	Strays (#6), Cobweb (#10)
35	September 3, 2023	Sound of Freedom	$3,989,423	Retribution (#4), Viaje Todo Robado (#9)
36	September 10, 2023	The Nun II	$9,570,167	Meine Chaosfee & ich (#9)
37	September 17, 2023	The Nun II	$5,400,000	A Haunting in Venice (#3), Welcome al Norte (#5), The Dive (#6), After Everything (#7)
38	September 24, 2023	The Nun II	$2,270,819	Surviving My Quinceañera (#2), Expend4bles (#3), Heroic (#5)
39	October 1, 2023	PAW Patrol: The Mighty Movie	$2,769,096	Saw X (#2), The Creator (#5)
40	October 8, 2023	The Exorcist: Believer	$3,845,621	
41	October 15, 2023	Taylor Swift: The Eras Tour	$6,800,000	The Equalizer 3 (#3)
42	October 22, 2023	Taylor Swift: The Eras Tour	$4,253,194	Radical (#2), Killers of the Flower Moon (#5), Mira (#7)
43	October 29, 2023	Five Nights at Freddy's	$10,810,000	Trolls Band Together (#4), Hypnotic (#8), Dumb Money (#10)
44	November 5, 2023	Five Nights at Freddy's	$6,548,927	The Jester (#5), Señora influencer (#6), Confesiones (#7), 97 Minutes (#10)
45	November 12, 2023	The Marvels	$3,042,098	All Fun and Games (#9)
46	November 19, 2023	The Hunger Games: The Ballad of Songbirds & Snakes	$4,018,476	Helt Super (#10)
47	November 26, 2023	The Hunger Games: The Ballad of Songbirds & Snakes	$3,423,054	Napoleon (#2), Wish (#3), The Haunting of the Queen Mary (#8)
48	December 3, 2023	Napoleon	$2,183,778	Papá o Mamá (#4), Thanksgiving (#5), Digimon Adventure 02: The Beginning (#9), Renaissance: A Film by Beyoncé (#10)
49	December 10, 2023	Wonka	$6,180,801	It Lives Inside (#7), Silent Night (#8)
50	December 17, 2023	Wonka	$5,999,185	Migration (#2), The Mean One (#8), The Marsh King's Daughter (#9)
51	December 24, 2023	Aquaman and the Lost Kingdom	$7,024,301	Lord of Misrule (#8)
52	December 31, 2023	Aquaman and the Lost Kingdom	$7,658,319	Godzilla Minus One (#4), The Boy and the Heron (#5), Next Goal Wins (#6), Priscilla (#8)

== Highest-grossing films ==
Highest-grossing films of 2023
Rank	Title	Distributor	Mex gross US$	Mex gross MX$
1.	The Super Mario Bros. Movie	Universal	$89,052,192	$1,539,986,624
2.	Barbie	Warner Bros.	$54,112,569	$909,189,804
3.	Fast & Furious X	Universal	$38,979,237	$664,503,183
4.	Guardians of the Galaxy Vol. 3	Disney	$37,353,725	$638,357,977
5.	Spider-Man: Across the Spider-Verse	Sony	$29,437,069	$495,490,632
6.	Wonka	Warner Bros.	$27,159,092	$454,451,899
7.	Five Nights at Freddy's	Universal	$23,009,000	$394,555,192
8.	Aquaman and the Lost Kingdom	Warner Bros.	$22,840,322	$384,515,560
9.	The Nun II	Warner Bros.	$21,458,104	$374,636,010
10.	The Little Mermaid	Disney	$21,293,399	$363,011,009

== See also ==
- List of Mexican films — Mexican films by year
- 2023 in Mexico

Preceded by 2022	Box office number-one films of Mexico; 2023	Succeeded by 2024
