= List of 2016 box office number-one films in Mexico =

This is a list of films which placed number one at the weekend box office for the year 2016.

== Number-one films ==
#	Date	Film	Gross (USD)	Openings in the top ten
1	January 3, 2016	Alvin and the Chipmunks: The Road Chip	$2,483,602	Concussion (#3), Solace (#5), El Cumple de la Abuela (#8)
2	January 10, 2016	Point Break	$1,923,839	Joy (#5), Summer Camp (#7), The Big Short (#8)
3	January 17, 2016	Point Break	$1,193,286	The Danish Girl (#2), Mortadelo and Filemon: Mission Implausible (#4), Pay the Ghost (#7)
4	January 24, 2016	The Revenant	$4,485,305	
5	January 31, 2016	Daddy's Home	$2,421,009	The 5th Wave (#3), The Boy (#4), Creed (#5)
6	February 7, 2016	Daddy's Home	$1,297,703	Norm of the North (#5), Fifty Shades of Black (#8), The Hateful Eight (#9), Pride and Prejudice and Zombies (#10)
7	February 14, 2016	Deadpool	$7,226,374	Busco Novio Para mi Mujer (#2), Visions (#9), Carol (#10)
8	February 21, 2016	Zootopia	$4,564,709	How to Be Single (#3), The Forest (#5), Room (#6)
9	February 28, 2016	Zootopia	$3,291,823	Gods of Egypt (#3), Zoolander 2 (#4), Las Aparicio: La Película (#5), The Finest Hours (#6)
10	March 6, 2016	Zootopia	$2,403,856	Dirty Grandpa (#4), Backtrack (#6), 13 Hours: The Secret Soldiers of Benghazi (#8), The Choice (#9)
11	March 13, 2016	Kung Fu Panda 3	$5,172,092	London Has Fallen (#3), Paraíso Perdido (#7), The Young Messiah (#9)
12	March 20, 2016	Kung Fu Panda 3	$3,002,381	The Divergent Series: Allegiant (#2), Risen (#6), Irrational Man (#10)
13	March 27, 2016	Batman v Superman: Dawn of Justice	$12,256,287	My Big Fat Greek Wedding 2 (#5), Capture the Flag (#6), Truth (#10)
14	April 3, 2016	Batman v Superman: Dawn of Justice	$5,386,095	Compadres (#2), Miracles from Heaven (#3), Eddie the Eagle (#5)
15	April 10, 2016	The Huntsman: Winter's War	$2,777,671	The Jungle Book 3D (#3), Burnt (#7), Chronic (#9)
16	April 17, 2016	The Jungle Book	$6,588,342	10 Cloverfield Lane (#4), Desierto (#5), Boruto: Naruto the Movie (#8)
17	April 24, 2016	The Jungle Book	$5,282,187	Eye in the Sky (#3), Before I Wake (#5), Sundown (#9), God's Not Dead 2 (#10)
18	May 1, 2016	Captain America: Civil War	$20,472,106	Youth (#9)
19	May 8, 2016	Captain America: Civil War	$6,770,483	Mother's Day (#3), The Other Side of the Door (#4), My King (#10)
20	May 15, 2016	¿Qué Culpa Tiene el Niño?	$3,582,114	The Angry Birds Movie (#2)
21	May 22, 2016	X-Men: Apocalypse	$6,982,357	The Witch (#4), Rumbos Paralelos (#6), Labyrinth of Lies (#8)
22	May 29, 2016	Alice Through the Looking Glass	$4,545,297	Neighbors 2: Sorority Rising (#4), Fathers and Daughters (#7)
23	June 5, 2016	Teenage Mutant Ninja Turtles: Out of the Shadows	$3,721,182	Tini: El Gran Cambio de Violetta (#8)
24	June 12, 2016	The Conjuring 2	$7,458,608	A Hologram for the King (#6), De Surprise (#9), Ratchet & Clank (#10)
25	June 19, 2016	The Conjuring 2	$3,447,284	Warcraft (#2), Money Monster (#5), Pinocchio (#8)
26	June 26, 2016	Independence Day: Resurgence	$6,807,844	Me Before You (#2)
27	July 3, 2016	Ice Age: Collision Course	$8,453,629	Central Intelligence (#4), La Niña De La Mina (#6), Louder Than Bombs (#9)
28	July 10, 2016	The Legend of Tarzan	$4,519,253	The Nice Guys (#6), The Faith of Anna Waters (#7), Julieta (#9)
29	July 17, 2016	Finding Dory	$9,537,312	The Shallows (#4)
30	July 24, 2016	Finding Dory	$4,090,870	Now You See Me 2 (#2), Criminal (#5), Cell (#9)
31	July 31, 2016	The Secret Life of Pets	$7,496,779	Lights Out (#2), The Wave (#6), Batman: The Killing Joke (#10)
32	August 7, 2016	Suicide Squad	$10,346,298	The Whole Truth (#6), East Side Sushi (#10)
33	August 14, 2016	Suicide Squad	$4,371,410	Ghostbusters (#2), The BFG (#4), Free State of Jones (#9)
34	August 21, 2016	Ben-Hur	$2,683,725	The Purge: Election Year (#3), Me Estás Matando Susana (#7), Skiptrace (#9)
35	August 28, 2016	Jason Bourne	$1,507,072	Bad Moms (#5)
36	September 4, 2016	Mike and Dave Need Wedding Dates	$1,023,116	Nine Lives (#6), Nerve (#7)
37	September 11, 2016	Star Trek Beyond	$1,286,108	Mechanic: Resurrection (#2)
38	September 18, 2016	No Manches Frida	$3,226,095	Pete's Dragon (#2), Don't Breathe (#3), Bridget Jones's Baby (#4)
39	September 25, 2016	Storks	$2,425,893	Bastille Day (#5), The Magnificent Seven (#7), The Light Between Oceans (#9), 7:19 (#10)
40	October 2, 2016	Miss Peregrine's Home for Peculiar Children	$3,603,032	Deepwater Horizon (#4), Blair Witch (#5)
41	October 9, 2016	Treintona, Soltera y Fantástica	$2,364,087	Kubo and the Two Strings (#5), Blood Father (#8), Sausage Party (#9), Viral (#10)
42	October 16, 2016	Inferno	$2,545,428	Masterminds (#5)
43	October 23, 2016	Ouija: Origin of Evil	$2,211,371	La Leyenda del Chupacabras (#2), La Vida Inmoral de la Pareja Ideal (#6), The Infiltrator (#8)
44	October 30, 2016	Doctor Strange	$4,608,705	El Jeremías (#4)
45	November 6, 2016	Trolls	$2,645,678	The Accountant (#3), KM 31-2 (#4), Until Forever (#10)
46	November 13, 2016	Trolls	$1,661,909	The Girl on the Train (#3), Arrival (#5), Macho (#6), Robinson Crusoe (#8)
47	November 20, 2016	Fantastic Beasts and Where to Find Them	$5,774,215	The 9th Life of Louis Drax (#8), Café Society (#9)
48	November 27, 2016	Fantastic Beasts and Where to Find Them	$2,602,427	Jack Reacher: Never Go Back (#2), Shut In (#4), Keeping Up with the Joneses (#5)
49	December 4, 2016	Moana	$2,880,517	Underworld: Blood Wars (#2), Sully (#3), Qué Pena Tu Vida (#5)
50	December 11, 2016	Moana	$2,359,271	Office Christmas Party (#2), Train to Busan (#6), Blackway (#10)
51	December 18, 2016	Rogue One: A Star Wars Story	$5,129,571	Collateral Beauty (#2), The Disappointments Room (#5)
52	December 25, 2016	Sing	$1,701,157	Passengers (#3), Un Padre No Tan Padre (#4), Why Him? (#7)
53	January 1, 2017	Sing	$1,552,491	Ballerina (#4), Hacksaw Ridge (#6), Assassin's Creed (#8)

== Highest-grossing films ==
Highest-grossing films of 2016
Rank	Title	Distributor	Mex gross US$	Mex gross MX$
1.	Captain America: Civil War	Disney	$41,420,350	$724,173,688
2.	Batman v Superman: Dawn of Justice	Warner Bros.	$36,200,000	$628,854,331
3.	Suicide Squad	Warner Bros.	$27,600,000	$511,737,726
4.	Finding Dory	Disney	$24,781,954	$455,969,181
5.	The Jungle Book	Disney	$24,351,449	$427,525,447
6.	The Secret Life of Pets	Universal	$22,590,000	$421,047,381
7.	Ice Age: Collision Course	20th Century Fox	$22,228,297	$416,460,486
8.	The Conjuring 2	Warner Bros.	$20,425,659	$377,476,387
9.	Deadpool	20th Century Fox	$18,653,169	$322,606,541
10.	X-Men: Apocalypse	20th Century Fox	$17,807,456	$336,803,092

== See also ==
- List of Mexican films — Mexican films by year

Preceded by 2015	Box office number-one films of Mexico; 2016	Succeeded by 2017
