= List of 2013 box office number-one films in Mexico =

This is a list of films which placed number one at the weekend box office for the year 2013.

== Number-one films ==
#	Date	Film	Gross (USD)	Openings in the top ten
1	January 6, 2013	Life of Pi	$1,872,083	Jack Reacher (#2)
2	January 13, 2013	Life of Pi	$1,894,557	El Cartel de los Sapos (#5), Killing Them Softly (#9), Fire with Fire (#10)
3	January 20, 2013	Life of Pi	$1,697,313	Django Unchained (#2), Lincoln (#3)
4	January 27, 2013	Hansel & Gretel: Witch Hunters	$3,650,761	Broken City (#6)
5	February 3, 2013	Hansel & Gretel: Witch Hunters	$2,241,197	Mama (#2), Las aventuras de Tadeo Jones (#3), Bullet to the Head (#5), Hitchcock (#8), Alex Cross (#9)
6	February 10, 2013	Mama	$1,506,321	Flight (#4), Silver Linings Playbook (#5), Me Late Chocolate (#6), Warm Bodies (#7)
7	February 17, 2013	A Good Day to Die Hard	$2,482,569	Les Misérables (#2)
8	February 24, 2013	A Good Day to Die Hard	$1,444,210	Beautiful Creatures (#2), Gangster Squad (#4), Hope Springs (#9)
9	March 3, 2013	A Good Day to Die Hard	$936,788	Cirque du Soleil: Worlds Away (#5), Parker (#8), A Haunted House (#9)
10	March 10, 2013	Oz the Great and Powerful	$5,221,093	
11	March 17, 2013	Jack the Giant Slayer	$3,942,928	The Croods 3D (#3), Hit and Run (#7)
12	March 24, 2013	The Croods	$4,372,915	Side Effects (#5), Comme un Chef (#9)
13	March 31, 2013	G.I. Joe: Retaliation	$3,993,025	Nosotros los Nobles (#2), Kon-Tiki (#9)
14	April 7, 2013	The Croods	$2,550,339	Evil Dead (#5), Stolen (#6), Stocker (#9)
15	April 14, 2013	Oblivion	$2,738,839	Escape from Planet Earth (#5), Texas Chainsaw 3D (#6), Snitch (#9)
16	April 21, 2013	Nosotros los Nobles	$1,906,838	Olympus Has Fallen (#4), Dark Skies (#7), This Is 40 (#8)
17	April 28, 2013	Iron Man 3	$17,067,467	Quartet (#7)
18	May 5, 2013	Iron Man 3	$7,874,898	Identity Thief (#4), Trance (#5), Spring Breakers (#7)
19	May 12, 2013	Iron Man 3	$3,550,847	Star Trek Into Darkness (#2), Save Haven (#5)
20	May 19, 2013	Epic	$3,539,489	The Call (#5), The Last Exorcism Part II (#6), Dead Man Down (#8)
21	May 26, 2013	Fast & Furious 6	$12,698,298	
22	June 2, 2013	Fast & Furious 6	$7,573,683	The Great Gatsby (#2), Zambezia (#4), The Host (#7), The Man with the Iron Fists (#10)
23	June 9, 2013	After Earth	$5,286,359	Erased (#7), 21 & Over (#9)
24	June 16, 2013	Man of Steel	$9,680,184	The Place Beyond the Pines (#8)
25	June 23, 2013	Monsters University	$12,398,046	Ginger & Rosa (#8)
26	June 30, 2013	Monsters University	$7,985,188	World War Z (#2), The Hangover Part III (#3), Searching for Sugar Man (#9)
27	July 7, 2013	Despicable Me 2	$14,878,750	I'm So Excited (#5)
28	July 14, 2013	Despicable Me 2	$7,798,432	Pacific Rim (#2), The Bay (#5), Bachelorette (#8), Les Infidèles (#9)
29	July 21, 2013	Despicable Me 2	$3,755,524	Turbo (#2), The Lone Ranger (#3), Filly Brown (#8), Much Ado About Nothing (#10)
30	July 28, 2013	The Wolverine	$5,922,083	Scary Movie 5 (#6), The Bling Ring (#8)
31	August 4, 2013	The Smurfs 2	$4,084,225	Now You See Me (#2)
32	August 11, 2013	Percy Jackson: Sea of Monsters	$2,650,918	Pain & Gain (#6), The Big Wedding (#7)
33	August 18, 2013	Grown Ups 2	$3,618,778	Red 2 (#6), Kick-Ass 2 (#8)
34	August 25, 2013	The Conjuring	$4,322,676	Jurassic Park 3D (#6), Redemption (#10)
35	September 1, 2013	The Conjuring	$3,922,876	The Mortal Instruments: City of Bones (#2), The Heat (#3), One Direction: This Is Us (#5), Dino Time (#9)
36	September 8, 2013	The Conjuring	$2,355,890	White House Down (#2), We're the Millers (#3)
37	September 15, 2013	Planes	$2,400,151	The Internship (#4), 2 Guns (#8)
38	September 22, 2013	No Se Aceptan Devoluciones	$11,578,515	Killing Season (#10)
39	September 29, 2013	No Se Aceptan Devoluciones	$9,401,993	Dragon Ball Z: Battle of Gods (#2), Elysium (#3), Rush (#5)
40	October 6, 2013	No Se Aceptan Devoluciones	$5,312,533	Cloudy with a Chance of Meatballs 2 (#2), Jobs (#5), R.I.P.D. (#7), Tercera Llamada (#9)
41	October 13, 2013	No Se Aceptan Devoluciones	$2,767,592	Insidious: Chapter 2 (#3), Runner Runner (#4), Escape Plan (#10)
42	October 20, 2013	Gravity	$5,745,524	The Family (#5)
43	October 27, 2013	Gravity	$3,787,237	Riddick (#5)
44	November 3, 2013	Thor: The Dark World	$8,256,931	Enough Said (#6)
45	November 10, 2013	Thor: The Dark World	$4,460,594	Amor a Primera Visa (#2), Prisoners (#4), The Purge (#5), Machete Kills (#9)
46	November 17, 2013	Thor: The Dark World	$2,579,691	Carrie (#3), Foosball (#4), The Counselor (#5), The Butler (#7)
47	November 24, 2013	The Hunger Games: Catching Fire	$9,230,019	
48	December 1, 2013	The Hunger Games: Catching Fire	$4,325,236	Captain Phillips (#2), Jackass Presents: Bad Grandpa (#3), Don Jon (#8)
49	December 8, 2013	The Hunger Games: Catching Fire	$2,210,167	Free Birds (#2), Delivery Man (#7), About Time (#8), Frozen Ground (#9)
50	December 15, 2013	The Hobbit: The Desolation of Smaug	$5,067,599	Saving Santa (#5)
51	December 22, 2013	Frozen	$4,935,897	Walking with Dinosaurs (#3), Last Vegas (#5)
52	December 29, 2013	Frozen	$4,253,525	The Secret Life of Walter Mitty (#3), Blue Jasmine (#7)

== Highest-grossing films ==
Highest-grossing films of 2013
Rank	Title	Distributor	Gross (USD)
1.	Iron Man 3	Disney	$48,566,365
2.	Despicable Me 2	Universal	$47,702,364
3.	No Se Aceptan Devoluciones	Videocine	$46,103,013
4.	Monsters University	Disney	$37,608,021
5.	Fast & Furious 6	Universal	$35,860,202
6.	The Croods	20th Century Fox	$27,682,452
7.	Nosotros los Nobles	Warner Bros.	$26,250,219
8.	Frozen	Disney	$25,732,202
9.	The Hunger Games: Catching Fire	Videocine	$25,157,484
10.	Thor: The Dark World	Disney	$23,857,540

== See also ==
- List of Mexican films — Mexican films by year

Preceded by 2012	Box office number-one films of Mexico; 2013	Succeeded by 2014
