= Luis de la Rosa =

Mexican actor (born 2001)

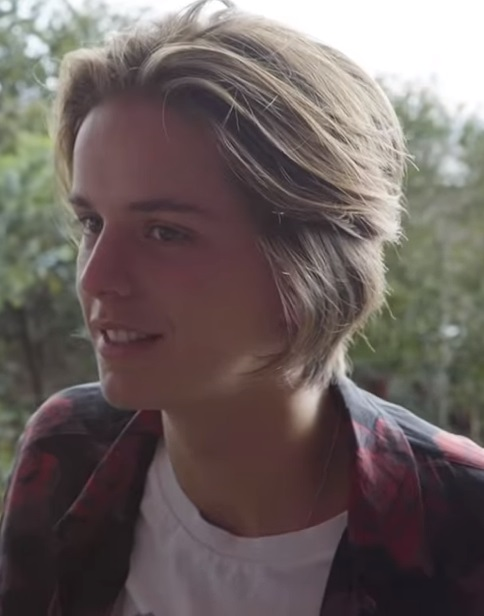
- de la Rosa in 2019
- Born: August 16, 2001 (age 25); Mexico City, Mexico
- Occupations: Actor; television presenter
- Years active: 2017–present

Luis de la Rosa is a Mexican actor, best known for his role as Mexican singer Luis Miguel as a teenager in the biographical drama series Luis Miguel: The Series, and as Bruno Riquelme de la Mora in The House of Flowers, both productions of Netflix. Subsequently, he had a leading role in the 2019 Mexican film Un papá pirata.

== Career ==
De la Rosa studied in Canada for some time as a teenager. He started acting in 2017 by doing the play Les Misérables in his school, where he played Gavroche. Subsequently, he was chosen by the producer of the film Mientras el lobo no está.

== Filmography ==
Films roles
Year	Title	Roles	Notes
2017	Mientras el lobo no está	Alex	
2018	Imprisoned	Ronnie	
2019	All the Freckles in the World	Kenji	
2019	Un papá pirata	Ian	

Television roles
Year	Title	Roles	Notes
2018	Luis Miguel: The Series	Young Luis Miguel	Series regular (season 1); 6 episodes
2018–2020	The House of Flowers	Bruno Riquelme de la Mora	Series regular (seasons 1–3); 23 episodes
2021	The Mosquito Coast	Hugo	Guest star; 1 episode

Stage roles
Year	Title	Roles	Notes
2017	Les Misérables	Gavroche	
