= All the Freckles in the World =

2019 Mexican film directed by Yibrán Asuad

- Promotional poster for the film.
- Spanish: Todas las pecas del mundo
- Directed by: Yibrán Asuad
- Written by: Yibrán Asuad; Javier Peñasola; Gibrán Portela
- Produced by: Yibrán Asuad; Gerardo Gatica; Alberto Muffelmann; José Nacif; Ramiro Ruiz; Mónica Vértiz
- Starring: Hanssel Casillas; Loreto Peralta; Luis de la Rosa; Emiliano Castro; Andrea Sutton; Alejandro Flores
- Cinematography: Matias Penachino
- Edited by: Yibrán Asuad
- Music by: Pedro Zulu González
- Distributed by: Cinépolis Distribución (Mexico); Netflix (Worldwide)
- Release dates: 27 September 2019 (Mexico); 3 January 2020 (Worldwide)
- Running time: 89 minutes
- Country: Mexico
- Language: Spanish
- Box office: US$945 thousand

All the Freckles in the World (Spanish: Todas las pecas del mundo) is a 2019 Mexican coming-of-age romantic comedy film produced by Filmadora and Panorama Global. It was directed and written by Yibrán Asuad (in his directorial debut) and also written by Javier Peñasola and Gibrán Portela. It stars Hanssel Casillas, Loreto Peralta, Luis de la Rosa, Emiliano Castro, Andrea Sutton, Alejandro Flores, and others. It was released in Mexico on 27 September 2019. On 3 January 2020, All the Freckles in the World was released on Netflix after finding success in theaters in Mexico. It received neutral reviews, and did fairly well in the box office, peaking at No. 8 in Mexico during the week of 29 September. As of 22 October 2019, it grossed a total of US$945 thousand in Mexico.

== Plot ==
In 1994, 13-year-old José Miguel moves to Mexico City and goes to a new school in the peak of World Cup fever. There, he falls in love with Cristina, but in order to be with her, he has to break up her current relationship with Kenji Matarazzo. José bakes a cake for Cristina for her birthday; however, when José's dad shows up the day before and eats the cake, José's mom gives him money to buy something for her from the bakery. At school, he gives her the gift and they become friends.

After school, José heads home with Liliana, who gives him a cassette tape. Liliana kisses José. However, when José rejects her advances and says that he still likes Cristina, they decide to stay friends and act like it didn't happen.

José gives the cassette tape to Cristina as a gift and she takes it. As they start getting closer, José creates a soccer team and enters into their school's soccer tournament to impress Cristina. One day after school, Cristina lets Kenji listen to the cassette. Kenji says he doesn't like rock music and asks where she got it from. The next day at school, when Kenji learns that José gave it to her, Kenji confronts José in the bathroom. They make a bet that whoever wins the final in the tournament would keep Cristina and the other would never talk to her again; however, José's team loses miserably at the final.

After the game, when José insists Kenji cheated, Kenji tells José to meet him after school where they will fight for Cristina. After school, Cristina tells José not to fight, but when he says he has to fight for her honor, she pleads to Kenji to go easy on him since he's just a freshman. José throws dirt at Kenji, and in retaliation, he punches José in the face, knocking him to the ground. When Cristina goes to see if José is fine, they kiss.

A few weeks later, at an ice skating rink, Cristina talks while José doesn't listen. He tells her that he believes he likes Liliana. Angry, Cristina slaps him and leaves. José brings flowers to Liliana but sees her making out with Kenji. He tells her that he likes her and she rebuffs him. Back at home, José's father tells him that they're moving.

Cristina and Liliana listen to music together at school. José walks towards them and tells them that he loved them both. Later, José and his family drive towards their new house, making a stop for their daughter to pee. José takes this time to walk around, stopping by a girl hitting baseballs. It ends with him falling in love with her. As the credits roll, there is a follow-up in their lives, along with everyone else.

== Cast ==
Pía Vinageras was the casting coordinator and Luis Escárcega was the extras coordinator.

- Hanssel Casillas as José Miguel Mota Palermo, a small boy and inventor who is attracted to girls with freckles.
- Loreto Peralta as Cristina Palazuelos, José's love interest.
- Luis de la Rosa as Kenji Matarazzo, Cristina's boyfriend.
- Andrea Sutton as Liliana, José's other love interest.
- Francesca Fusaro as Carmina 1, Liliana and Carmina's friend.
- Savitri Alpizar as Carmina 2, Liliana and Carmina's friend.
- Alejandro Flores as Rodrigo Malo, José's teammate who is having an affair with Yolanda.
- Emiliano Castro as Manuel "Tarolas" Angulo, José's teammate.
- Axel Contreras as Osvaldo "Thriller" García, José's teammate.
- Abraham Kleinfinger as Rodolfo "Guácala" Patiño, José's teammate.
- Marcelo Barceló as Miguel "Motorcito" Jiménez, José's teammate.
- Montserrat Marañón as Yolanda, the geography teacher who is having an affair with Malo.
- Juan Carlos "Juca" Viana Pierto as Rambo Rodríguez, the referee.
- Anajosé Aldrete as Josefina Mota, José's mother.
- Cecelia Flores as "Pecosa 2.0", José's new love interest and future wife.

== Production ==
Filming for the film started in August 2018. The trailer for All the Freckles in the World was released on 4 July 2019 to YouTube by Cinépolis.

== Release ==
All the Freckles in the World premiered in theaters in Mexico on 27 September 2019, under the name of Todas las pecas del mundo. It was released on Netflix worldwide on 3 January 2020. With the move to Netflix, new versions in different languages were recorded, such as English, Brazilian Portuguese, and a Spanish audio description for visually impaired listeners. Subtitles were also provided in Spanish, English, French, Italian, and German.

== Reception ==
In their series "La Veo o No La Veo" (lit. "I see it or I don't see it"), Eduardo Molina and Edgardo Reséndiz from Grupo Reforma suggests to their viewers to watch All the Freckles in the World. They praised it for the good directing work from Yirbán Asuad and for its amazing casting, especially with Loreto Peralta. They also said it had a good feeling of nostalgia for older viewers. Uriel Linares from SensaCine gave All the Freckles in the World a 3 out of 5 stars for its relatability and realness. He states that it is a film that will greatly help the Mexican film industry by steadily moving away from romantic comedies that bet on obscenities in order to arouse a hidden morbidity within the public. John Serba of Decider, in their series "Stream It or Skip It?", recommends for reader to stream it, calling it "amusing, if not uproarious; familiar but well-written; good, but not life-changing." He compares the film to The Book of Henry, Me and Earl and the Dying Girl, and The Edge of Seventeen because it feels like an average coming-of-age story.
