= List of 2025 box office number-one films in Mexico =

Continuing the on-going lists of #1 films at the box office in Mexico during 2025

This is a list of films which placed number one at the weekend box office in Mexico for the year 2025.

#	Date	Film	Gross (USD)	Openings in the top ten
1	January 5, 2025	Mufasa: The Lion King	$4,644,293	Nosferatu (#3), Flow (#4)
2	January 12, 2025	Mufasa: The Lion King	$2,201,311	Conclave (#5), The Exorcists (#8), Arcadian (#9)
3	January 19, 2025	Mufasa: The Lion King	$1,458,679	Mesa de Regalos (#4), Paddington in Peru (#7), Den of Thieves 2: Pantera (#8), Anora (#10)
4	January 26, 2025	Interstellar: 10th Anniversary	$1,176,921	Wolf Man (#4), Emilia Pérez (#8)
5	February 2, 2025	Mesa de Regalos	$1,335,000	Dog Man (#4), Flight Risk (#5), A Complete Unknown (#9), Companion (#10)
6	February 9, 2025	Mesa de Regalos	$1,125,005	The Brutalist (#8), A Real Pain (#9), Absolution (#10)
7	February 16, 2025	Captain America: Brave New World	$6,509,205	Bridget Jones: Mad About the Boy (#3)
8	February 23, 2025	Captain America: Brave New World	$2,808,981	The Monkey (#2), Memoir of a Snail (#7), Maria (#9), Spirited Away (#10)
9	March 2, 2025	Captain America: Brave New World	$2,372,670	¡Qué Huevos, Sofía! (#3), The Sloth Lane (#5), Better Man (#8)
10	March 9, 2025	Captain America: Brave New World	$1,361,887	Mickey 17 (#2), Presence (#7), Pattie et la Colère de Poséidon (#10)
11	March 16, 2025	Mickey 17	$1,193,684	Novocaine (#4), Colorful Stage! The Movie: A Miku Who Can't Sing (#6), Black Bag (#8)
12	March 23, 2025	Snow White	$3,955,509	The Accursed (#9), Armor (#10)
13	March 30, 2025	Snow White	$2,017,653	A Working Man (#2)
14	April 6, 2025	A Minecraft Movie	$11,034,113	Werewolves (#10)
15	April 13, 2025	A Minecraft Movie	$7,530,682	The Amateur (#2), The Chosen: The Last Supper - Part 1 (#3), Drop (#4), The King of Kings (#8), Lo Que Dice el Corazón (#9), The Unbreakable Boy (#10)
16	April 20, 2025	A Minecraft Movie	$6,339,546	Sinners (#2), The Day the Earth Blew Up: A Looney Tunes Movie (#4), Loco por Ella (#5), Warfare (#9)
17	April 27, 2025	A Minecraft Movie	$3,701,715	Star Wars: Episode III – Revenge of the Sith (20th Anniversary) (#2), The Accountant 2 (#4), Until Dawn (#7)
18	May 4, 2025	Thunderbolts*	$7,377,278	Pride & Prejudice: 20th Anniversary (#7), Un Cuento de Pescadores: La Leyenda de la Miringua (#9)
19	May 11, 2025	Thunderbolts*	$4,013,673	Karate Kid: Legends (#2), Mamá Reinventada (#3), Locked (#7)
20	May 18, 2025	Final Destination Bloodlines	$5,418,694	Kayara (#9), Bob Trevino Likes It (#10)
21	May 25, 2025	Lilo & Stitch	$23,942,157	Mission: Impossible – The Final Reckoning (#2)
22	June 1, 2025	Lilo & Stitch	$14,766,190	The Phoenician Scheme (#6), Hurry Up Tomorrow (#7), The Knocking (#8), Deliver Us (#9)
23	June 8, 2025	Lilo & Stitch	$6,856,010	Ballerina (#4), How to Train Your Dragon (3D Preview) (#5)
24	June 15, 2025	How to Train Your Dragon	$11,670,050	Guns Up (#10)
25	June 22, 2025	How to Train Your Dragon	$6,790,759	28 Years Later (#2), Elio (#4)
26	June 29, 2025	F1	$6,800,000	M3GAN 2.0 (#3)
27	July 6, 2025	Jurassic World Rebirth	$13,966,960	The Good Teacher (#10)
28	July 13, 2025	Superman	$11,061,994	The Bayou (#9)
29	July 20, 2025	Superman	$7,859,407	Smurfs (#4), I Know What You Did Last Summer (#6)
30	July 27, 2025	The Fantastic Four: First Steps	$12,171,740	Young Hearts (#10)
31	August 3, 2025	The Fantastic Four: First Steps	$4,629,490	The Bad Guys 2 (#2), Materialists (#4), The Naked Gun (#5), Together (#6), The Ritual (#8)
32	August 10, 2025	Weapons	$2,850,000	Freakier Friday (#2), Demon Slayer: Kimetsu no Yaiba – The Movie: Mugen Train (#5)
33	August 17, 2025	Freakier Friday	$2,941,333	Mirreyes vs Godínez: Las Vegas (#4)
34	August 24, 2025	Freakier Friday	$1,941,685	Bring Her Back (#7), Dracula (#8), Nobody 2 (#9)
35	August 31, 2025	Freakier Friday	$1,217,935	The Roses (#7), Caught Stealing (#8)
36	September 7, 2025	The Conjuring: Last Rites	$13,300,000	
37	September 14, 2025	Demon Slayer: Kimetsu no Yaiba – The Movie: Infinity Castle	$9,971,811	The Ugly Stepsister (#4), Toy Story: 30th Anniversary (#5), 200% Wolf (#8)
38	September 21, 2025	Demon Slayer: Kimetsu no Yaiba – The Movie: Infinity Castle	$5,065,000	A Big Bold Beautiful Journey (#5), Dangerous Animals (#6), Aztec Batman: Clash of Empires (#8)
39	September 28, 2025	The Conjuring: Last Rites	$2,090,000	One Battle After Another (#3), Gabby's Dollhouse: The Movie (#4), The Long Walk (#5), Desastre en Familia (#6), Hamilton (#10)
40	October 5, 2025	Taylor Swift: The Official Release Party of a Showgirl	$4,550,000	Avatar: The Way of Water (Re-release) (#8), Him (#10)
41	October 12, 2025	Tron: Ares	$2,910,446	The Smashing Machine (#4)
42	October 19, 2025	Black Phone 2	$4,416,784	Stitch Head (#6), After the Hunt (#8)
43	October 26, 2025	Black Phone 2	$2,246,000	Chainsaw Man – The Movie: Reze Arc (#2), Regretting You (#3), Soy Frankelda (#5), Good Boy (#6), Back to the Future: 40th Anniversary (#8)
44	November 2, 2025	KPop Demon Hunters	$2,100,000	Good Fortune (#6), No Me Sigas (#7)
45	November 9, 2025	Predator: Badlands	$2,343,860	Die My Love (#7), Roofman (#9)
46	November 16, 2025	Now You See Me: Now You Don't	$2,965,700	The Running Man (#4), Night of the Zoopocalypse (#8), Tormento (#9)
47	November 23, 2025	Wicked: For Good	$4,102,092	Jujutsu Kaisen: Execution (#3)
48	November 30, 2025	Zootopia 2	$10,403,739	Borrón y Vida Nueva (#6)
49	December 7, 2025	Five Nights at Freddy's 2	$6,900,000	Eternity (#4), Bugonia (#5)
50	December 14, 2025	Zootopia 2	$6,114,665	Corpse Bride: 20th Anniversary (#4), Silent Night, Deadly Night (#8)
51	December 21, 2025	Avatar: Fire and Ash	$10,042,068	
52	December 28, 2025	Avatar: Fire and Ash	$8,938,695	The SpongeBob Movie: Search for SquarePants (#2), Anaconda (#5), La Celda de los Milagros (#8), Sentimental Value (#9)

== Highest-grossing films ==
Highest-grossing films of 2025
Rank	Title	Distributor	Mex gross US$	Mex gross MX$
1.	Lilo & Stitch	Disney	$67,192,403	$1,258,715,285
2.	Avatar: Fire and Ash	20th Century	$43,029,986	$759,304,947
3.	Zootopia 2	Disney	$41,538,234	$732,981,567
4.	How to Train Your Dragon	Universal	$37,343,547	$702,185,651
5.	Jurassic World Rebirth	Universal	$36,999,480	$689,600,000
6.	A Minecraft Movie	Warner Bros.	$34,173,688	$659,450,000
7.	The Conjuring: Last Rites	Warner Bros.	$31,205,067	$575,100,032
8.	The Fantastic Four: First Steps	Disney	$28,684,259	$535,735,905
9.	Superman	Warner Bros.	$23,192,831	$433,500,000
10.	F1	Warner Bros.	$20,150,000	$375,650,249

== See also ==
- List of Mexican films — Mexican films by year
- 2025 in Mexico

Preceded by 2024	Box office number-one films 2025	Succeeded by 2026
