= List of 2020 box office number-one films in Mexico =

This is a list of films which placed number one at the weekend box office for the year 2020.

== Number-one films ==
#	Date	Film	Gross (USD)	Openings in the top ten
1	January 5, 2020	Jumanji: The Next Level	$1,688,078	Charlie's Angels (#2), Richard Jewell (#7), La Marca del Demonio (#9), The Lighthouse (#10)
2	January 12, 2020	Jumanji: The Next Level	$1,055,102	Underwater (#2), Perdida (#3), 10 Minutes Gone (#9), La liga de los 5 (#10)
3	January 19, 2020	Bad Boys for Life	$3,824,093	1917 (#2), The Hollow Child (#8), Judy (#9)
4	January 26, 2020	Bad Boys for Life	$2,395,092	Cindy la Regia (#2), Little Women (#4), Jojo Rabbit (#5), The Turning (#8)
5	February 2, 2020	Dolittle	$3,495,029	Gretel & Hansel (#4), Countdown (#7), Bombshell (#8), Like a Boss (#10)
6	February 9, 2020	Birds of Prey	$4,184,092	
7	February 16, 2020	Sonic the Hedgehog	$6,894,019	Loco por Ti (#3), The Grudge (#4), The Gentlemen (#8)
8	February 23, 2020	Sonic the Hedgehog	$3,545,092	The Call of the Wild (#2), Just Mercy (#6)
9	March 1, 2020	Sonic the Hedgehog	$2,273,409	The Invisible Man (#2), Rebelión de los Godínez (#4), An Officer and a Spy (#10)
10	March 8, 2020	Onward	$2,854,091	Malasaña 32 (#5)
11	March 15, 2020	Onward	$1,169,028	Bloodshot (#2), Veinteañera, Divorciada y Fantástica (#3), My Spy (#6)
12	March 22, 2020	Veinteañera, Divorciada y Fantástica	$169,098	Night Hunter (#4), A Score to Settle (#5)
13	March 29, 2020	Theaters closed due to the COVID-19 pandemic.		
14	April 5, 2020	Theaters closed due to the COVID-19 pandemic.		
15	April 12, 2020	Theaters closed due to the COVID-19 pandemic.		
16	April 19, 2020	Theaters closed due to the COVID-19 pandemic.		
17	April 26, 2020	Theaters closed due to the COVID-19 pandemic.		
18	May 3, 2020	Theaters closed due to the COVID-19 pandemic.		
19	May 10, 2020	Theaters closed due to the COVID-19 pandemic.		
20	May 17, 2020	Theaters closed due to the COVID-19 pandemic.		
21	May 24, 2020	Theaters closed due to the COVID-19 pandemic.		
22	May 31, 2020	Theaters closed due to the COVID-19 pandemic.		
23	June 7, 2020	Theaters closed due to the COVID-19 pandemic.		
24	June 14, 2020	Theaters closed due to the COVID-19 pandemic.		
25	June 21, 2020	Theaters closed due to the COVID-19 pandemic.		
26	June 28, 2020	Theaters closed due to the COVID-19 pandemic.		
27	July 5, 2020	The Invisible Man	$1,097	
28	July 12, 2020	Dolittle	$1,079	
29	July 19, 2020	The Addams Family	$954	
30	July 26, 2020	The Invisible Man	$209	
31	August 2, 2020	The Hunt	$27,981	
32	August 9, 2020	The Hunt	$33,027	
33	August 16, 2020	The Hunt	$45,146	I Still Believe (#2)
34	August 23, 2020	Scoob!	$250,932	Cuidado con lo que Deseas (#2), Jurassic World: Fallen Kingdom (#3)
35	August 30, 2020	Scoob!	$257,332	Fantasy Island (#2), The Secret: Dare to Dream (#4), Inception (#6), Guns Akimbo (#9)
36	September 6, 2020	The New Mutants	$554,096	The Climbers (#5), Ordinary Love (#9)
37	September 13, 2020	The New Mutants	$419,009	Organizadora de Bodas (#4), Spycies (#6)
38	September 20, 2020	Tenet	$596,244	Donne Moi Des Alies (#7)
39	September 27, 2020	Break the Silence: The Movie	$745,029	Trolls: World Tour (#2), El Club de los Idealistas (#5), Sin Origen (#7)
40	October 4, 2020	Trolls: World Tour	$285,093	Sputnik (#4), Padre No Hay Más Que Uno (#7), Lassie Come Home (#8)
41	October 11, 2020	Tenet	$209,091	Red Shoes and the Seven Dwarfs (#4), Apparition (#5), Bill & Ted Face the Music (#7)
42	October 18, 2020	Honest Thief	$535,948	Cats & Dogs 3: Paws Unite! (#5), Girl on the Third Floor (#8)
43	October 25, 2020	Nuevo Orden	$409,209	The Empty Man (#4)
44	November 1, 2020	The Witches	$835,029	The Craft: Legacy (#4), The Collini Case (#10)
45	November 8, 2020	The Witches	$515,000	Peninsula (#2)
46	November 15, 2020	The Witches	$372,000	Freaky (#3), El Camino de Xico (#5), Weathering with You (#7), Dark Light (#8)
47	November 22, 2020	Greenland	$739,019	El Baile de los 41 (#3), 100% Wolf (#5), LM5: The Tour - The Film (#10)
48	November 29, 2020	Greenland	$539,091	Z (#5), Henchmen (#9)
49	December 6, 2020	Greenland	$392,003	Wonder Woman (#2), My Hero Academia: Heroes Rising (#3), Tunnelen (#4), Mario Puzo's The Godfather, Coda: The Death of Michael Corleone (#10)
50	December 13, 2020	The Croods: A New Age	$945,920	Happiest Season (#4)
52	December 20, 2020	Wonder Woman 1984	$1,674,091	
53	December 27, 2020	Wonder Woman 1984	$688,004	Dime Cuando Tú (#3)

== Highest-grossing films ==
Highest-grossing films of 2020
Rank	Title	Distributor	Mex gross US$	Mex gross MX$
1.	Sonic the Hedgehog	Paramount	$18,436,471	$351,254,158
2.	Bad Boys for Life	Sony	$12,580,056	$302,248,425
3.	Birds of Prey	Warner Bros.	$11,300,000	$212,544,279
4.	Dolittle	Universal	$9,313,238	$187,834,764
5.	1917	Universal	$5,875,757	$129,513,127
6.	Onward	Disney	$5,424,451	$114,864,433
7.	Cindy la Regia	Videocine	$5,222,322	$111,079,440
8.	The Invisible Man	Universal	$5,190,771	$110,703,573
9.	Wonder Woman 1984	Warner Bros.	$4,959,500	$101,765,073
10.	Jojo Rabbit	20th Century Fox	$4,952,293	$91,805,941

== See also ==
- List of Mexican films — Mexican films by year

Preceded by 2019	Box office number-one films of Mexico; 2020	Succeeded by 2021
