= The Djinn =

2021 supernatural horror film

- Theatrical release poster
- Directed by: David Charbonier; Justin Powell
- Written by: David Charbonier; Justin Powell
- Produced by: Ryan Scaringe; Carter Armstrong; Meghan Weinstein
- Starring: Ezra Dewey; Tevy Poe; Rob Brownstein; John Erickson
- Cinematography: Julian Estrada
- Music by: Matthew James
- Production companies: Mad Descent; Kinogo Pictures
- Distributed by: IFC Midnight
- Release date: May 14, 2021
- Running time: 81 min
- Country: United States
- Language: English
- Box office: $124,772

The Djinn is a 2021 American supernatural horror film directed and written by David Charbonier and Justin Powell. The film stars Ezra Dewey, Rob Brownstein, Tevy Poe and John Erickson. It was released in the United States in select theaters and through video on demand on May 14, 2021, by IFC Midnight. The film received positive reviews from critics, with praise directed at Dewey's performance.

== Plot ==
On an unspecified night in 1989, Dylan Jacobs, a mute and asthmatic young boy, finds his mother Michelle crying in front of the kitchen sink with a candle lit nearby. She turns around and the candle is blown out.

In the fall of the same year, Dylan and his father Michael move to a new house. In one of the rooms, Dylan finds a dusty mirror and an old book containing instructions for summoning a djinn and having it grant the summoner's wish. The book states that at one hour before midnight, the summoner must place three drops of blood in a lit candle's wax and make their desired wish in front of a mirror; the djinn will grant the wish at midnight if the summoner has the required strength of will, but the wish may cost the summoner their soul. Dylan does not tell Michael about the book.

On the same night, Michael leaves Dylan at home for his job as a host at a radio station. Dylan takes the opportunity to set up the ritual for summoning the djinn, and he uses sign language to wish that he had a voice. Later, the djinn manifests as a cloud of smoke, and after a series of strange events occur, Dylan finds out that the djinn has transformed into a humanoid figure and is searching for him. After knocking the djinn unconscious, Dylan finds that he is unable to escape the house or contact anyone for help.

While hiding from the djinn, Dylan reads through the book again and learns that the djinn is subject to the laws of physics while in the human world, manifests in the form of dead people, and can be banished by blowing out the candle after midnight; he tries and fails to do so due to the time being before midnight. Dylan hears Michelle's voice begging for help, and finds that the djinn has manifested as a demonic version of Michelle. Dylan evades the djinn's attempts to capture him. A flashback reveals that Michelle had shot herself in the opening scene of the film; Dylan was unable to call out to her due to his muteness, and has felt guilty about her death ever since.

At midnight, the djinn confronts Dylan. Dylan prepares to blow out the candle when the djinn begs Dylan not to make it go away in Michelle's voice. Dylan does not fall for it and blows out the candle, successfully banishing the djinn. Dylan later comes to terms with his guilt about Michelle's suicide in a dream.

On the next morning, the djinn manifests again and transfers Michael's ability to speak to Dylan, rendering Michael unable to speak, before returning to the book. Michael, his throat now slashed, begins to have trouble breathing as Dylan pleads for the djinn to come back and undo the effects of his wish.

== Cast ==
- Ezra Dewey as Dylan Jacobs
- Rob Brownstein as Michael Jacobs
- Tevy Poe as Michelle Jacobs
- John Erickson as The Djinn

== Release ==
The Djinn was released in the United States on May 14, 2021, by IFC Midnight.

=== Critical response ===
The film received positive reviews from critics. The review aggregator website Rotten Tomatoes reports an approval rating of 87% based on 69 reviews, with an average rating of 6.7 out of 10. The site's critics' consensus reads: "Led by Ezra Dewey's standout performance, The Djinn serves up a scary, sleekly effective cautionary tale about being careful what you wish for."

Kristy Puchko of Pajiba praised the film for its use of its 1980s setting, its use of imagery and its depiction of Dylan, but criticized the premise as being "thin, turning the final act into a bit of a ragged tumble". She concluded: "Charbonier and Powell know how to brew atmosphere and empathy, creating child characters who feel fleshed out and not like precocious poppets to be pitied or fawned over." Writing for Crooked Marquee, Kimber Myers gave the film a "B+", saying that the film "isn’t just a lesson on the price of getting what you wish for; it’s also an 82-minute class on how to make an unnerving film on the cheap".

Writing for RogerEbert.com, Simon Abrams gave the film 1 out of 4 stars, stating that "Dewey’s just not a strong enough performer to carry an entire movie with just his body language and facial expressions" and that the film "often lurches from one moment to the next, and rarely settles on noteworthy character details or special effects." Sarah Michelle Fitters of MovieFreak gave the film 2 out of 4 stars, saying "there are no shocks and zero surprises to be found in the scenario that Charbonier and Powell have cooked up for audiences to enjoy", though she praised Dewey's performance, the film's production value and the design of the djinn.
