= Chilangolandia =

- Theatrical release poster
- Directed by: Carlos Santos
- Written by: Carlos Santos
- Produced by: Ana Laura Calderón; Armando Castañeda; Eduardo Echeverría; Fernanda Meza
- Starring: Liliana Arriaga; Priscila Arias; Silverio Palacios; Pierre Louis; Moises Iván Mora
- Cinematography: Felipe Escalona
- Edited by: Carlos Santos
- Music by: Micky Sierra
- Production company: Sastre Films
- Release date: September 16, 2021
- Running time: 93 minutes
- Country: Mexico
- Language: Spanish

Chilangolandia is a 2021 Mexican crime comedy film written and directed by Carlos Santos in his directorial debut. It stars Liliana Arriaga, Priscila Arias, Silverio Palacios, Pierre Louis and Moises Iván Mora.

== Synopsis ==
'Chilangolandia' is a place where many things happen and many stories are told, like that of Ramiro, the taxi driver. He is convinced that his life will change when his nephew "El Chulo" becomes the next soccer star by testing himself in the basic forces. On the other side of the city, Carmen and Miguel – a woman desperately seeking to improve her economic situation in the company of her bossy husband – will receive a suitcase with 10 million pesos by mistake. The owner of the suitcase will seek to recover his money while Carmen and her husband must pay their debts and spend the money before they are caught.

== Cast ==
The actors participating in this film are:

- Aarón Aguilar as Miguel
- Priscila Arias as "La Beba"
- Liliana Arriaga as Carmen
- Pierre Louis as "El Chulo"
- Silverio Palacios as Ramiro
- Moisés Iván Mora as Pollo
- Ariana Dugarte as Gaby
- Francisco Denis as Carlos Sotomayor
- Carlos Corona as Deputy Fonseca
- Emmanuel Orenday as "El Gusano"
- Luis Felipe Tovar as "La Rata Hernández"
- Analy Castro as Furniture Store Cashier

== Release ==
Chilangolandia premiered on September 16, 2021, in Mexican theaters. It premiered internationally on December 25, 2021, on Amazon Prime Video.

== Reception ==
=== Box-office ===
In its first weekend, the film debuted in second place on the billboards, attracting 206.6 thousand theatergoers and grossing $13 million pesos. At the end of the year, Chilangolandia was positioned as the third most viewed Mexican film of 2021, which collected 35.2 million pesos with 595 thousand viewers.

=== Accolades ===
Year	Award	Category	Recipient	Result	Ref
2023	Canacine Awards	Best Film	Chilangolandia	Nominated	
2023	Canacine Awards	Best Director	Carlos Santos	Nominated	
2023	Canacine Awards	Best Actor	Aarón Aguilar	Won	
2023	Canacine Awards	Best Actress	Liliana Arriaga	Nominated	
2023	Canacine Awards	Best Newcomer - Male	Pierre Louis	Nominated	
