= List of Netflix exclusive international distribution films =

These products, even though Netflix lists them as Netflix Originals, are programs that have been aired in different countries, and Netflix has bought exclusive distribution rights to stream them in other various countries. They may be available on Netflix in their home territory and other markets where Netflix does not have the first run license, without the Netflix Original label, some time after their first-run airing on their original broadcaster.

== Feature films ==
Title	First screening	Genre	Runtime	Netflix exclusive region	Language	Notes
The Little Prince	May 22, 2015	CGI animation adventure	1 h 46 min	United States, United Kingdom, Ireland, Australia and New Zealand	English	
The Crew	October 7, 2015	Crime drama	1 h 21 min	Selected territories	French	
Kung Fu Panda 3	January 23, 2016	CGI animation martial arts comedy	1 h 34 min	Japan	English	
Sand Storm	January 25, 2016	Drama	1 h 28 min	Worldwide except Israel and France	Arabic	
Crouching Tiger, Hidden Dragon: Sword of Destiny	February 18, 2016	Action	1 h 43 min	Selected territories	English	
The 4th Company	March 6, 2016	Crime drama	1 h 56 min	Selected territories	Spanish	
Journey to Greenland	May 15, 2016	Comedy	1 h 38 min	Worldwide except France	French	
Hell or High Water	May 16, 2016	Crime drama	1 h 43 min	Italy, San Marino, Vatican City and Japan	English	
Mercenary	May 16, 2016	Sports drama	1 h 38 min	Selected territories, including Sweden and Czech Republic	French	
Two Lovers and a Bear	May 18, 2016	Drama	1 h 36 min	United States	English	
Divines	May 19, 2016	Drama	1 h 45 min	Worldwide except France	French	
Big Fish & Begonia	July 8, 2016	Animated epic fantasy	1 h 45 min	Selected territories including Japan and Latin America	Mandarin	
Bad Moms	July 19, 2016	Comedy	1 h 40 min	Japan	English	
Skiptrace	July 21, 2016	Action/Adventure	1 h 47 min	United Kingdom, Ireland and France	English	
Before I Wake	July 31, 2016	Horror-Fantasy	1 h 37 min	United States, United Kingdom, Ireland, France, the Czech Republic and the Nordics	English	
David Brent: Life on the Road	August 19, 2016	Comedy	1 h 36 min	Worldwide except United Kingdom, Ireland, Australia, and New Zealand	English	
The Bad Batch	September 6, 2016	Black comedy thriller	1 h 55 min	Selected territories excluding United States	English	
Message from the King	September 8, 2016	Drama	1 h 43 min	United States, Sweden, multiple territories	English	
Layla M.	September 10, 2016	Drama	1 h 38 min	Worldwide except the Netherlands and Japan	Dutch	
Brain on Fire	September 14, 2016	Drama	1 h 35 min	North America, the United Kingdom, Ireland, France, Spain, Germany, Austria, Italy, Vatican City, San Marino, the Benelux, India, Pakistan, Bangladesh, Nepal, Bhutan, Sri Lanka, the CIS, Malta, Monaco, Australia and New Zealand	English	
Middle School: The Worst Years of My Life	October 7, 2016	Comedy	1 h 32 min	United Kingdom, Ireland, the Benelux, Germany, Austria, Italy, Spain, Japan and India	English	
Mindhorn	October 9, 2016	Comedy	1 h 28 min	Worldwide except the United Kingdom and Ireland	English	
In the Shadow of Iris	November 16, 2016	Thriller	1 h 38 min	Worldwide except France	French	
Slam	November 20, 2016	Teen drama	1 h 40 min	Worldwide except Italy	Italian	
'76	November 25, 2016	Drama	1 h 58 min	Selected territories	English	
Pandora	December 7, 2016	Thriller	2 h 16 min	Multiple territories except South Korea and Japan	Korean	
The Lighthouse of the Orcas	December 13, 2016	Drama	1 h 50 min	Worldwide except Spain and Argentina	Spanish	
The 101-Year-Old Man Who Skipped Out on the Bill and Disappeared	December 25, 2016	Comedy	1 h 48 min	Worldwide except the Nordics, Germany, Austria, Switzerland, Japan and Luxembourg	Swedish	
Sahara	January 18, 2017	CGI animation comedy	1 h 24 min	Selected territories	French	
Before I Fall	January 21, 2017	Drama/mystery	1 h 38 min	Canada, Czech Republic, France, Hungary, the United Kingdom, Ireland, Japan, Lithuania, Poland and Slovakia	English	
Bushwick	January 21, 2017	Action adventure	1 h 34 min	Australia, Canada, France, Israel, Russia, South Korea, the United Kingdom, Ireland and the United States	English	
Mudbound	January 21, 2017	Drama	2 h 14 min	Worldwide except Latin America, Portugal, Greece, Cyprus, Georgia, Azerbaijan, the Caribbean and Turkey	English	
My Happy Family	January 22, 2017	Drama	2 h	Worldwide except France	Georgian	
The Space Between Us	February 3, 2017	Science fiction	2 h 1 min	Japan, Italy, San Marino and Vatican City	English	
On Body and Soul	February 10, 2017	Drama	1 h 57 min	North and Hispanic America, the Caribbean, the Middle East, India, Pakistan, Afghanistan, Bhutan, Bangladesh, Sri Lanka, Mongolia and South Africa	Hungarian	
The Climb	February 18, 2017	Comedy	1 h 45 min	Selected territories, including United States, United Kingdom, Canada and Sweden	French	
Lucid Dream	February 22, 2017	Thriller	1 h 41 min	Worldwide except South Korea	Korean	
Orbiter 9	April 7, 2017	Science fiction	1 h 35 min	Worldwide except Spain, Japan, Germany, Austria and Switzerland	Spanish	
The Circle	April 26, 2017	Thriller	1 h 50 min	United Kingdom and Ireland	English	
Blade of the Immortal	April 29, 2017	Action-drama	2 h 20 min	Spain, Sweden, Poland and the Czech Republic	Japanese	
A Prayer Before Dawn	May 19, 2017	Drama	1 h 56 min	India, Hong Kong and Singapore	English	
Good Time	May 25, 2017	Crime drama	1 h 50 min	Spain, Italy, Vatican City, San Marino, the United Kingdom, Ireland, Scandinavia, Israel, Portugal, Bulgaria, the CIS, the Baltics, former Yugoslavia, Hungary, Poland, Czech Republic, Romania, South Korea, Singapore, Malaysia, Thailand, Japan, Australia and New Zealand	English	
Ali's Wedding	June 8, 2017	Romantic comedy	1 h 50 min	Worldwide except Australia, New Zealand and China	Arabic	
Animal Crackers	June 12, 2017	Animated comedy	1 h 44 min	Selected territories	English	
All Eyez on Me	June 14, 2017	Biographical drama	2 h 20 min	Selected territories	English	
Catching Feelings	June 18, 2017	Romantic comedy	2 h 4 min	Worldwide	English	
You Get Me	June 19, 2017	Thriller	1 h 29 min	Worldwide except Spain and Sweden	English	
Kidnap	July 31, 2017	Thriller	1 h 22 min	United Kingdom and Ireland	English	
6 Days	August 4, 2017	Action thriller	1 h 34 min	United Kingdom, Ireland, France, Germany, Austria, Switzerland, Latin America, India, Japan, the Benelux, the Nordics, Eastern Europe, Italy, San Marino, Vatican City, Malta, South Africa and Israel	English	
What Happened to Monday	August 5, 2017	Science fiction-thriller	2 h 3 min	United States, Latin America, the Caribbean, the United Kingdom, Ireland and Malta	English	
The Hitman's Bodyguard	August 18, 2017	Action comedy	1 h 58 min	Japan	English	
Home Again	August 29, 2017	Romantic comedy	1 h 37 min	India and Japan	English	
Maktub	September 6, 2017	Drama	1 h 40 min	Selected territories including Sweden	Hebrew	
Kodachrome	September 8, 2017	Drama	1 h 40 min	United States, Canada, the United Kingdom, Ireland, France, Germany, Austria, Switzerland, Italy, the Benelux, Japan, India, Pakistan, Sri Lanka, Nepal, South Africa, the Nordics, Malta, Montenegro, Monaco, Liechtenstein and Eastern Europe	English	
Manhunt	September 8, 2017	Action thriller	1 h 46 min	Selected territories including the United States	Japanese	
Ravenous	September 8, 2017	Horror	1 h 36 min	Worldwide except Canada, Latin America and Eastern Europe	French	
The Ritual	September 8, 2017	Horror	1 h 34 min	Worldwide except the United Kingdom, Ireland and Latin America	English	
The Motive	September 9, 2017	Drama	1 h 52 min	Worldwide except Japan, South Korea and China	Spanish	
The Foreigner	September 24, 2017	Action/thriller	1 h 54 min	United Kingdom and Ireland	English	
Rock My Heart	September 26, 2017	Drama	1 h 49 min	Selected territories	German	
Errementari	October 12, 2017	Fantasy	1 h 38 min	Selected territories including Japan	Basque	
A Bad Moms Christmas	October 30, 2017	Comedy	1 h 44 min	Japan	English	
Gnome Alone	November 2, 2017	CGI animation fantasy	1 h 25 min	United States, Canada, Australia, New Zealand and Japan	English	
The Skin of the Wolf	November 3, 2017	Drama	1 h 50 min	Worldwide except Spain	Spanish	
Godzilla: Planet of the Monsters	November 17, 2017	Anime	1 h 29 min	Worldwide except Japan	Japanese	
Forgotten	November 29, 2017	Thriller	1 h 48 min	South Korea, the Czech Republic, Sweden and Japan	Korean	
The 3rd Eye	November 30, 2017	Horror	1 h 47 min	Selected territories	Indonesian	
Fullmetal Alchemist	December 1, 2017	Fantasy adventure	2 h 15 min	United States, United Kingdom, Sweden and additional territories	Japanese	
Burn Out	December 11, 2017	Action thriller	1 h 47 min	Worldwide except France	French	
Steel Rain	December 14, 2017	Action	2 h 19 min	Worldwide except Australia, New Zealand, Israel, Singapore and Thailand	Korean	
Guardians of the Tomb	January 19, 2018	Adventure	1 h 30 min	Selected territories	English	
The Kindergarten Teacher	January 19, 2018	Drama	1 h 36 min	United States and Canada	English	
Time Share	January 20, 2018	Drama	1 h 36 min	Worldwide except Mexico, Belgium and the Netherlands	Spanish	
White Fang	January 21, 2018	CGI animation adventure-drama	1 h 25 min	North and Latin America, the United Kingdom, Ireland, the Caribbean, Eastern Europe, the CIS, Israel, Australia, New Zealand, South Africa and Asia except Afghanistan	French	
And Breathe Normally	January 22, 2018	Drama	1 h 35 min	Selected territories	Icelandic	
Beirut	January 22, 2018	Spy thriller	1 h 49 min	Selected territories including Japan	English	
Blockbuster	January 24, 2018	Comedy	1 h 25 min	Selected territories	French	
Psychokinesis	January 31, 2018	Action	1 h 41 min	Worldwide except South Korea	Korean	
Sara's Notebook	January 31, 2018	Thriller	1 h 55 min	Worldwide except Hong Kong, India, Japan, Singapore, Spain and Thailand	Spanish	
The Titan	February 8, 2018	Science fiction	1 h 37 min	North and Latin America, the Caribbean, Italy, San Marino, Vatican City, the Benelux, Poland, the Czech Republic, Romania, Slovakia, Japan, Malta, Australia and New Zealand	English	
Annihilation	February 13, 2018	Science fiction	1 h 55 min	Worldwide except United States, Canada and China	English	
River's Edge	February 15, 2018	Comedy drama	1 h 58 min	Selected territories including Sweden	Japanese	
Dovlatov	February 17, 2018	Drama	2 h 6 min	North America, the United Kingdom and Ireland	Russian	
Sunday's Illness	February 20, 2018	Drama	1 h 53 min	Selected territories including Sweden and United States	Spanish	
The Warning	February 24, 2018	Thriller	1 h 32 min	Selected territories	Spanish	
The Tribe	February 27, 2018	Comedy	1 h 30 min	Worldwide except Spain and Taiwan	Spanish	
Pickpockets	March 3, 2018	Crime drama	1 h 48 min	Selected territories	Spanish	
The Resistance Banker	March 8, 2018	Thriller	2 h 3 min	Selected territories including Sweden	Dutch	
Duck Duck Goose	March 9, 2018	CGI animation comedy	1 h 29 min	Selected territories including the United States	English	
The Breaker Upperers	March 10, 2018	Romantic comedy drama	1 h 30 min	Worldwide except Australia and New Zealand	English	
The Laws of Thermodynamics	March 13, 2018	Romantic comedy	1 h 40 min	Worldwide except Spain	Spanish	
Solo	March 18, 2018	Thriller	1 h 31 min	Worldwide except Spain	Spanish	
The Guernsey Literary and Potato Peel Pie Society	April 9, 2018	Historical-drama	2 h 4 min	North and Latin America, Italy, Vatican City, San Marino, Eastern Europe, Malta, India, Pakistan, Sri Lanka, Nepal, Turkey, South Korea, Hong Kong, Indonesia, Malaysia, Vietnam and Thailand	English	
Jefe	April 15, 2018	Comedy	1 h 29 min	Selected territories	Spanish	
Dry Martina	April 17, 2018	Comedy	1 h 35 min	Selected territories	Spanish	
The World Is Yours	April 18, 2018	Comedy	1 h 45 min	Selected territories including Sweden	French	
Perdida	April 19, 2018	Thriller	1 h 45 min	Selected territories excluding Argentina	Spanish	
Crossroads: One Two Jaga	April 20, 2018	Drama	1 h 21 min	Selected territories	Malay	
I Feel Pretty	April 20, 2018	Comedy	1 h 50 min	Selected territories	English	
Charming	April 20, 2018	Animated musical comedy	1 h 25 min	Selected territories	English	
Zoe	April 21, 2018	Science fiction	1 h 44 min	France, Japan, the Benelux, the Nordics and Monaco	English	
Us and Them	April 28, 2018	Drama	1 h 59 min	Worldwide except China	Mandarin	
MILF	May 2, 2018	Romantic comedy	1 h 41 min	Selected territories	French	
Anon	May 4, 2018	Science fiction	1 h 40 min	North and Latin America, France, the Benelux, Scandinavia, Poland, the Czech Republic, Hungary, Romania, Monaco, Liechtenstein, Australasia and South Korea	English	
Shéhérazade	May 11, 2018	Drama	1 h 51 min	Worldwide except France	French	
Girl	May 12, 2018	Drama	1 h 45 min	North and Latin America and the Caribbean	Dutch	
Happy as Lazzaro	May 13, 2018	Drama	2 h 10 min	North and Latin America and the Caribbean	Italian	
Godzilla: City on the Edge of Battle	May 18, 2018	Anime	1 h 40 min	Worldwide except Japan	Japanese	
In Darkness	May 25, 2018	Thriller	1 h 41 min	Selected territories	English	
How to Get Over a Breakup	May 31, 2018	Comedy	1 h 44 min	Selected territories	Spanish	
My Teacher, My Obsession	June 12, 2018	Thriller	1 h 30 min	Australia	English	
Kuntilanak	June 15, 2018	Horror	1 h 45 min	Selected territories	Indonesian	
Budapest	June 27, 2018	Comedy	1 h 42 min	Selected territories including Sweden	French	
All Is Well	July 1, 2018	Drama	1 h 30 min	Selected territories	German	
Flavors of Youth: International Version	July 6, 2018	Anime	1 h 14 min	Worldwide except Japan	Japanese	
Sabrina	July 12, 2018	Horror	1 h 53 min	Worldwide except Singapore, Indonesia and Malaysia	Indonesian	
Break	July 18, 2018	Comedy	1 h 36 min	Selected territories	French	
Bleach	July 20, 2018	Action-drama	1 h 48 min	Worldwide except Japan	Japanese	
Illang: The Wolf Brigade	July 25, 2018	Action	2 h 19 min	Worldwide except South Korea	Korean	
Pulang	July 26, 2018	Drama	1 h 58 min	Selected territories including Sweden	Malay	
A Land Imagined	August 7, 2018	Thriller	1 h 35 min	Selected territories	Mandarin	
May the Devil Take You	August 9, 2018	Horror	1 h 50 min	Worldwide except the Netherlands, Poland, Turkey, Indonesia, Malaysia	Indonesian	
A Fortunate Man	August 20, 2018	Drama	2 h 42 min	Selected territories	Danish	
A.X.L.	August 24, 2018	Science fiction	1 h 38 min	Selected territories	English	
I Am Jonas	August 28, 2018	Drama	1 h 22 min	Selected territories	French	
High Society	August 29, 2018	Drama	2 h 17 min	Selected territories	Korean	
Operation Finale	August 29, 2018	Drama	2 h 2 min	Worldwide except the United States	English	
Munafik 2	August 30, 2018	Horror	1 h 44 min	Selected territories	Malay	
Yucatán	August 31, 2018	Comedy	2 h 9 min	Selected territories	Spanish	
A Twelve-Year Night	September 1, 2018	Drama	2 h 2 min	Selected territories	Spanish	
Close Enemies	September 1, 2018	Drama	1 h 51 min	Selected territories	French	
Curtiz	September 1, 2018	Drama	1 h 38 min	Selected territories	English	
At Eternity's Gate	September 3, 2018	Biopic	1 h 51 min	France	English	
Joy	September 3, 2018	Drama	1 h 39 min	Selected territories	English	
Goyo: The Boy General	September 5, 2018	Drama	2 h 30 min	Selected territories	Filipino	
Lady J	September 7, 2018	Drama	1 h 49 min	Worldwide except France, Switzerland, Canada and the Benelux	French	
Next Gen	September 7, 2018	CGI animation action science fiction	1 h 44 min	Worldwide except China	English	
When Angels Sleep	September 7, 2018	Drama	1 h 31 min	Selected territories	Spanish	
Cities of Last Things	September 8, 2018	Drama	1 h 47 min	Selected territories	Mandarin	
The Burial of Kojo	September 21, 2018	Drama	1 h 20 min	Selected territories	Akan	
Girls with Balls	September 23, 2018	Comedy	1 h 17 min	Selected territories	French	
Paskal	September 27, 2018	Drama	1 h 55 min	Selected territories	Malay	
Battle	September 28, 2018	Drama	1 h 38 min	Selected territories	Norwegian	
The Awakening of Motti Wolkenbruch	September 29, 2018	Comedy	1 h 30 min	Selected territories	German	
Animas	October 3, 2018	Horror	1 h 23 min	Worldwide except Spain	Spanish	
El Potro: Unstoppable	October 4, 2018	Drama	2 h 2 min	Selected territories	Spanish	
Malevolent	October 5, 2018	Horror	1 h 28 min	United States and selected territories, excluding Taiwan	English	
Nothing to Hide	October 17, 2018	Drama	1 h 33 min	Worldwide except France	French	
Pachamama	October 20, 2018	Animation	1 h 11 min	Worldwide except France, Belgium, Luxembourg, Switzerland and Canada	French	
Your Son	October 20, 2018	Drama	1 h 43 min	Selected territories	Spanish	
The Photographer of Mauthausen	October 26, 2018	Drama	1 h 50 min	Selected Territories	Spanish	
Gun City	October 31, 2018	Crime thriller	2 h 5 min	Selected territories	Spanish	
The Tree of Blood	October 31, 2018	Drama	2 h 15 min	Worldwide except Spain	Spanish	
Dear Ex	November 2, 2018	Drama	1 h 40 min	Selected territories	Mandarin	
Bayonet	November 3, 2018	Drama	1 h 41 min	Selected territories	Spanish	
Godzilla: The Planet Eater	November 3, 2018	Anime	1 h 32 min	Worldwide except Japan	Japanese	
Mirage	November 13, 2018	Drama	2 h 9 min	Selected territories	Spanish	
Suzzanna: Buried Alive	November 15, 2018	Horror	2 h 5 min	Selected territories	Indonesian	
Bad Seeds	November 21, 2018	Comedy	1 h 40 min	Selected territories	French	
The Plagues of Breslau	November 28, 2018	Thriller	1 h 33 min	Selected territories	Polish	
Revenger	December 6, 2018	Action	1 h 41 min	Selected territories	Korean	
Willy and the Guardians of the Lake: Tales from the Lakeside Winter Adventure	December 6, 2018	Animation/Family	1 h 10 min	Selected territories	Hungarian	
Dumplin'	December 7, 2018	Musical comedy drama	1 h 50 min	North and Latin America, the Caribbean, the United Kingdom, Ireland, France, Germany, Austria, Switzerland, the Benelux, Italy, Vatican City, San Marino, Andorra, Malta, Monaco, Australasia, Japan, Thailand, South Korea, Bulgaria and Poland	English	
The Drug King	December 19, 2018	Drama	2 h 19 min	Selected Territories	Korean	
Second Act	December 21, 2018	Romantic comedy	1 h 44 min	Selected territories including Japan	English	
Aurora	December 25, 2018	Drama	1 h 50 min	Selected territories	Filipino	
In Family I Trust	January 16, 2019	Comedy	1 h 37 min	Selected territories	Spanish	
The 3rd Eye 2	January 17, 2019	Horror	1 h 56 min	Selected territories	Indonesian	
Close	January 18, 2019	Thriller	1 h 34 min	Selected territories	English	
I Am Mother	January 25, 2019	Science fiction thriller	1 h 53 min	Worldwide except Germany, Austria, Switzerland, the CIS, the Baltics, Liechtenstein, Montenegro, Georgia, Moldova, Belarus, Croatia, North Macedonia, Albania, Myanmar, Taiwan, Laos, Cambodia, Indonesia, Thailand and Slovenia	English	
Serenity	January 25, 2019	Drama	1 h 46 min	Selected territories	English	
The Boy Who Harnessed the Wind	January 25, 2019	Drama	1 h 53 min	Worldwide except Japan, China and United Kingdom free TV	English	
Extremely Wicked, Shockingly Evil and Vile	January 26, 2019	Thriller	1 h 48 min	North and Latin America, France, Spain, Scandinavia, the Benelux, Australasia and Turkey	English	
Wounds	January 26, 2019	Horror	1 h 34 min	Worldwide except the United States	English	
Money Trap	February 1, 2019	Comedy	2 h 1 min	Selected territories	Turkish	
The Wandering Earth	February 5, 2019	Drama	2 h 5 min	Selected territories	Mandarin	
System Crasher	February 8, 2019	Drama	1 h 58 min	Selected territories	German	
37 Seconds	February 9, 2019	Drama	1 h 55 min	Selected territories	Japanese	
Isn't It Romantic	February 13, 2019	Romantic comedy	1 h 28 min	Worldwide except the United States and Canada	English	
Oh, Ramona!	February 14, 2019	Comedy	1 h 49 min	Selected territories	English	
Paradise Beach	February 20, 2019	Thriller	1 h 33 min	Selected territories	French	
Svaha: The Sixth Finger	February 20, 2019	Thriller	2 h 2 min	Worldwide except South Korea	Korean	
The Wolf's Call	February 20, 2019	Drama	1 h 55 min	Selected territories	French	
Furie	February 22, 2019	Action-drama	1 h 37 min	Selected territories	Vietnamese	
Blood Will Tell	February 28, 2019	Thriller	1 h 53 min	Selected territories	Spanish	
DJ Cinderella	February 28, 2019	Drama	1 h 35 min	Selected territories	Portuguese	
Booksmart	March 10, 2019	Coming-of-age comedy	1 h 45 min	Selected territories including France	English	
Ready to Mingle	March 10, 2019	Comedy	1 h 37 min	Selected territories	Spanish	
Jo Pil-ho: The Dawning Rage	March 20, 2019	Drama	2 h 7 min	Selected Territories	Korean	
The Silent War	March 22, 2019	Drama	2 h 1 min	Selected territories	Spanish	
Let's Dance	March 27, 2019	Drama	1 h 49 min	Selected territories	French	
Maria	March 27, 2019	Drama	1 h 30 min	Selected territories	Filipino	
Boi	March 29, 2019	Thriller	1 h 51 min	Selected territories	Spanish	
After	April 8, 2019	Drama	1 h 45 min	Selected territories	English	
The Ruthless	April 8, 2019	Crime drama	1 h 30 min	Worldwide except France	Italian	
The Silence	April 10, 2019	Horror	1 h 30 min	Selected territories	English	
The Little Switzerland	April 26, 2019	Comedy	1 h 26 min	Selected territories	Spanish	
The Son	May 2, 2019	Psychological thriller	1 h 32 min	Worldwide except China, South Korea, Argentina and Uruguay	Spanish	
Atlantics	May 16, 2019	Drama	1 h 46 min	Worldwide except France, Switzerland, Russia, Monaco, the Benelux and China	Wolof	
Kardec	May 16, 2019	Drama	1 h 50 min	Selected territories	Portuguese	
I Lost My Body	May 17, 2019	Animated fantasy drama	1 h 21 min	Worldwide except China, the Benelux, Monaco, France and Turkey	French	
An Easy Girl	May 20, 2019	Comedy	1 h 32 min	Selected territories	French	
Shaft	June 14, 2019	Action comedy	1 h 51 min	Worldwide except the United States and Canada	English	
Hot Gimmick: Girl Meets Boy	June 28, 2019	Drama	1 h 59 min	Worldwide except Japan	Japanese	
The Match	July 1, 2019	Action/Drama	1 h 36 min	Selected territories	Italian	
Pokémon: Mewtwo Strikes Back—Evolution	July 4, 2019	Anime	1 h 38 min	Worldwide except Japan and South Korea	Japanese	
4L	July 12, 2019	Comedy	1 h 44 min	Selected territories	Spanish	
Kidnapping Stella	July 12, 2019	Crime drama	1 h 29 min	Selected territories	German	
Dragon Quest: Your Story	July 16, 2019	Anime	1 h 42 min	Selected territories	Japanese	
The Soul Collector	July 20, 2019	Horror	1 h 40 min	Selected territories	English	
Brother	July 31, 2019	Drama	1 h 36 min	Selected territories	French	
Till Death: Azalea's Wrath	August 8, 2019	Horror	1 h 45 min	Selected territories	Malay	
Dog Gone Trouble	August 8, 2019	CGI animation family comedy	1 h 27 min	Selected territories	English	
Shanghai Fortress	August 9, 2019	Action/Adventure	1 h 47 min	Selected territories	Mandarin	
NiNoKuni	August 23, 2019	Anime	1 h 46 min	Selected territories	Japanese	
Bombay Rose	August 28, 2019	Animated romantic drama	1 h 33 min	Worldwide except France	Hindi	
Go Karts	August 28, 2019	Family film	1 h 42 min	Worldwide except Australia and New Zealand	English	
School Life	August 28, 2019	Teen comedy	1 h 51 min	Selected territories	French	
Tune in for Love	August 28, 2019	Romantic drama	2 h 2 min	Worldwide except South Korea	Korean	
Eye for an Eye	August 30, 2019	Thriller	1 h 47 min	Selected territories	Spanish	
Uncut Gems	August 30, 2019	Crime thriller	2 h 15 min	Worldwide except the United States	English	
Wasp Network	September 1, 2019	Thriller	2 h 8 min	Worldwide except China, Hong Kong, Taiwan, Macau, Eastern Europe, the Baltics, Greece, Portugal, the Middle East, Israel, Georgia, Montenegro, the CIS and France	English	
A Sun	September 6, 2019	Drama	2 h 36 min	Worldwide except China	Mandarin	
Live Twice, Love Once	September 6, 2019	Drama	1 h 41 min	Selected territories	Spanish	
The Platform	September 6, 2019	Thriller	1 h 34 min	Selected territories	Spanish	
Get In	September 7, 2019	Thriller	1 h 37 min	Selected territories	French	
A Second Chance: Rivals!	September 17, 2019	Drama	1 h 31 min	Selected territories	English	
A Shaun the Sheep Movie: Farmageddon	September 22, 2019	Stop motion sci-fi comedy	1 h 26 min	North and Latin America and the Caribbean	English	
The Endless Trench	September 22, 2019	Historical drama	2 h 27 min	Selected territories	Spanish	
All the Freckles in the World	September 27, 2019	Romantic comedy	1 h 29 min	Selected territories	Spanish	
Latte and the Magic Waterstone	October 9, 2019	CGI animation adventure comedy	1 h 22 min	Selected territories	German	
The Legacy of the Bones	October 10, 2019	Thriller	2 h 1 min	Selected territories	Spanish	
Grandma's Wedding	October 11, 2019	Romantic comedy	1 h 37 min	Selected territories	Spanish	
The Influence	October 11, 2019	Horror	1 h 39 min	Selected territories	Spanish	
So My Grandma's a Lesbian!	October 20, 2019	Drama	1 h 34 min	Selected territories	Spanish	
Twin Murders: The Silence of the White City	October 25, 2019	Thriller	1 h 50 min	Selected territories	Spanish	
Arctic Dogs	November 1, 2019	CGI animation adventure comedy	1 h 32 min	Selected territories excluding the United States	English	
The Man Without Gravity	November 1, 2019	Drama	1 h 47 min	Selected territories excluding Japan	Italian	
Pets United	November 8, 2019	CGI animation science fiction fantasy	1 h 32 min	Selected territories	English	
The Coldest Game	November 8, 2019	Spy thriller	1 h 43 min	Selected territories	English	
The Silence of the Marsh	November 15, 2019	Thriller	1 h 32 min	Selected territories	Spanish	
How I Became a Gangster	December 12, 2019	Thriller	2 h 20 min	Selected territories	Polish	
18 Presents	January 2, 2020	Drama	1 h 55 min	Selected territories	Italian	
Mark of the Devil	January 3, 2020	Horror	1 h 22 min	Selected territories	Spanish	
Titus: Mystery of the Enygma	January 9, 2020	Animated mystery adventure	1 h 35 min	Selected territories excluding United States	Indonesian	
Cuties	January 23, 2020	Drama	1 h 36 min	Worldwide except France	French	
I Love You, Stupid	January 24, 2020	Romantic comedy	1 h 27 min	Selected territories	Spanish	
Worth	January 24, 2020	Biographical film	1 h 58 min	North and Latin America, Australia, New Zealand, the United Kingdom, Ireland, France, Eastern Europe, the CIS and Turkey	English	
Adú	January 31, 2020	Drama	1 h 59 min	Selected territories	Spanish	
Miami Bici	February 21, 2020	Comedy	1 h 38 min	Selected territories	Romanian	
Shine Your Eyes	February 21, 2020	Drama	1 h 42 min	Selected territories	Portuguese	
The Bridge Curse	February 27, 2020	Horror	1 h 28 min	Selected territories	Mandarin	
Mutiny of the Worker Bees	February 28, 2020	Comedy	2 h 13 min	Selected territories	Spanish	
The Hater	March 6, 2020	Drama	2 h 17 min	Worldwide except Poland	Polish	
Your Name Engraved Herein	March 14, 2020	Romantic drama	1 h 58 min	Selected territories	Mandarin	
Berlin, Berlin: Lolle on the Run	May 8, 2020	Comedy	1 h 21 min	Selected territories	German	
Santana	May 15, 2020	Action	1 h 46 min	Selected territories	English	
Jungle Beat: The Movie	June 15, 2020	CGI animation comedy	1 h 29 min	Worldwide except Mauritius	English	
#Alive	June 24, 2020	Horror drama	1 h 38 min	Selected territories	Korean	
Mother	July 3, 2020	Drama	2 h 6 min	Selected territories	Japanese	
A Choo	July 5, 2020	Heroic fantasy	1 h 41 min	Selected territories	Mandarin	
Simply Black	July 8, 2020	Comedy	1 h 30 min	Selected territories	French	
The Maid	July 9, 2020	Horror	1 h 42 min	Selected territories	Thai	
Into the Beat	July 16, 2020	Drama	1 h 42 min	Selected territories	German	
Don't Listen	July 24, 2020	Drama	1 h 38 min	Selected territories	Spanish	
One Small Problem	July 26, 2020	Comedy	1 h 35 min	Selected territories	Spanish	
Bigfoot Family	August 5, 2020	CGI animated comedy drama	1 h 30 min	Selected territories	French	
The SpongeBob Movie: Sponge on the Run	August 14, 2020	CGI animated adventure comedy	1 h 35 min	Worldwide except the United States, Canada and China	English	
Definition Please	August 15, 2020	Comedy drama	1 h 31 min	Selected territories	English	
Love the Way U Lie	August 20, 2020	Romantic comedy	1 h 39 min	Selected territories except the United States	Filipino	
Sky High	August 22, 2020	Action drama	2 h 1 min	Selected territories	Spanish	
Black Beach	August 23, 2020	Drama	1 h 55 min	Selected territories	Spanish	
The Swarm	August 29, 2020	Horror	1 h 40 min	Worldwide except France, Spain and China	French	
After We Collided	September 2, 2020	Romantic drama	1 h 45 min	Selected territories	English	
The Rope Curse 2	September 2, 2020	Horror	1 h 44 min	Selected territories	Mandarin	
How I Became a Superhero	September 6, 2020	Action comedy	1 h 41 min	Selected territories	French	
Dear Mother	September 7, 2020	Comedy	1 h 38 min	Selected territories	French	
So Much Love to Give	September 9, 2020	Comedy	1 h 48 min	Selected territories	Spanish	
DNA	September 11, 2020	Drama	1 h 30 min	North America, the U.K., Ireland, Australia, New Zealand, South Africa and the Middle East	French	
Penguin Bloom	September 12, 2020	Drama	1 h 35 min	North and Hispanic America, the Caribbean, the United Kingdom, Ireland, France, the Benelux, Scandinavia, Malta, Africa, the Middle East, India, South Korea, Japan, Hong Kong, Taiwan, Macau, Mongolia and Southeast Asia except Indonesia	English	
I Care a Lot	September 12, 2020	Crime thriller	1 h 58 min	U.S., Cuba, the Dominican Republic, the Bahamas, Haiti, France, Germany, Austria, Greece, Portugal, Eastern Europe, Monaco, Latin America, Africa, the Middle East, Israel, Turkey, India, Pakistan, Bangladesh, Nepal, Bhutan, Sri Lanka, Afghanistan, Mongolia, Macau and Southeast Asia	English	
Coven of Sisters	September 19, 2020	Drama	1 h 32 min	Selected territories	Spanish	
Enola Holmes	September 23, 2020	Mystery	2 h 3 min	Worldwide except China	English	
The Strange House	September 26, 2020	Family drama	1 h 39 min	Selected territories	German	
Firedrake the Silver Dragon	October 1, 2020	CGI animation fantasy	1 h 32 min	Worldwide except Germany and Taiwan	English	
Fierce	October 2, 2020	Musical comedy drama	1 h 58 min	Selected territories	Polish	
Run	October 8, 2020	Thriller	1 h 29 min	Selected territories	English	
Valley of the Dead	October 8, 2020	Zombie apocalypse / Historical drama	1 h 41 min	Selected territories	Spanish	
Børning 3: Asphalt Burning	October 9, 2020	Comedy	1 h 40 min	Selected territories	Norwegian	
Grandma's Last Wishes	October 9, 2020	Comedy	1 h 37 min	Selected territories	Spanish	
Love and Monsters	October 16, 2020	Monster-Adventure	1 h 49 min	Worldwide except United States	English	
The Stronghold	October 16, 2020	Action thriller	1 h 45 min	Worldwide except France	French	
Out of My League	October 17, 2020	Romantic comedy	1 h 31 min	Selected territories	Italian	
Little Big Women	October 22, 2020	Family drama	2 h 3 min	Selected territories	Mandarin	
You Animal!	October 28, 2020	Animated romantic comedy	1 h 13 min	Selected territories	Filipino	
And Tomorrow the Entire World	October 29, 2020	Political drama	1 h 51 min	Worldwide except Germany	German	
Dance of the Forty One	November 1, 2020	Drama	1 h 39 min	Selected territories	Spanish	
Classmates Minus	November 5, 2020	Dark comedy	2 h 2 min	Worldwide except Taiwan	Mandarin	
Xico's Journey	November 12, 2020	Animated fantasy adventure	1 h 26 min	Worldwide except Mexico	Spanish	
A Family	November 13, 2020	Drama	2 h 16 min	Selected territories	Japanese	
Alter Me	November 15, 2020	Romantic comedy	1 h 31 min	Selected Asian territories	Filipino	
Mosul	November 19, 2020	War drama	1 h 41 min	Selected territories	Arabic	
Stand by Me Doraemon 2	November 20, 2020	CGI animation comedy drama	1 h 36 min	Selected territories outside Asia	Japanese	
Riding with Sugar	November 27, 2020	Drama	1 h 46 min	Selected territories	English	
Namaste Wahala	December 1, 2020	Drama	1 h 46 min	Selected territories	English	
Silver Skates	December 10, 2020	Period romantic adventure film	2 h 17 min	Selected territories	Russian	
The Forgotten Battle	December 14, 2020	War drama	2 h 7 min	Worldwide except Netherlands	Dutch	
Misfit 3: The Finale	December 16, 2020	Comedy	1 h 22 min	Belgium	Dutch	
The Yin-Yang Master: Dream of Eternity	December 24, 2020	Fantasy	2 h 12 min	Selected territories	Mandarin	
News of the World	December 25, 2020	Western drama	1 h 59 min	Worldwide except the United States, Canada and Cuba	English	
Pokémon the Movie: Secrets of the Jungle	December 25, 2020	Anime	1 h 40 min	Worldwide except Japan, South Korea and China	Japanese	
Tell Me When	December 25, 2020	Comedy	1 h 37 min	Selected territories	Spanish	
Earwig and the Witch	December 30, 2020	Anime	1 h 22 min	Worldwide except Japan and the United States	Japanese	
Tarung Sarung	December 31, 2020	Action drama	1 h 45 min	Selected territories	Indonesian	
The Soul	January 7, 2021	Science fiction thriller	2 h 10 min	Selected territories	Mandarin	
Wish Dragon	January 15, 2021	CGI animation fantasy comedy	1 h 42 min	Worldwide except China	English	
Affliction	January 21, 2021	Horror	1 h 30 min	Selected territories	Indonesian	
All My Friends Are Dead	February 3, 2021	Comedy	1 h 36 min	Selected territories	Polish	
Extinct	February 11, 2021	CGI animation comedy	1 h 24 min	North and Latin America, the Caribbean, Australia, New Zealand, Germany, Spain, Italy, San Marino, Vatican City, Monaco, Malta, the Middle East, Turkey and Asia excluding China, Hong Kong, Taiwan and Macau	English	
Layla Majnun	February 11, 2021	Romantic drama	1 h 59 min	Selected territories	Indonesian	
New Gods: Nezha Reborn	February 12, 2021	Animated fantasy	1 h 50 min	Worldwide except China	Mandarin	
The Yin Yang Master	February 12, 2021	Fantasy	1 h 53 min	Worldwide except China	Mandarin	
SAS: Rise of the Black Swan	March 12, 2021	Action thriller	2 h 5 min	Selected territories	English	
Secret Magic Control Agency	March 18, 2021	CGI animation family adventure	1 h 45 min	Worldwide except Russia	Russian	
Major Grom: Plague Doctor	April 1, 2021	Action-adventure	2 h 17 min	Selected territories	Russian	
Man in Love	April 1, 2021	Romantic drama	1 h 55 min	Selected territories	Mandarin	
Homunculus	April 2, 2021	Psychological horror	1 h 55 min	Worldwide except Japan	Japanese	
Super Me	April 9, 2021	Science fiction	1 h 42 min	Selected territories	Mandarin	
Chernobyl 1986	April 15, 2021	Drama	2 h 16 min	Selected territories	Russian	
Don't Kill Me	April 21, 2021	Horror	1 h 30 min	Selected territories	Italian	
Stowaway	April 22, 2021	Science fiction thriller	1 h 56 min	United States, United Kingdom, Ireland, France, Australia, New Zealand, Spain, South Korea, Japan, Italy, Vatican City, San Marino, Portugal, Latin America, the Benelux, the Nordics, Iceland, India, Africa, central and eastern Europe, Turkey, Greece, Cyprus, Israel and Malta and selected post pay-one rights including Germany, Austria and Southeast Asia	English	
The Mitchells vs. the Machines	April 23, 2021	CGI animation family comedy	1 h 53 min	Worldwide except China	English	
Rurouni Kenshin: The Final	April 23, 2021	Period action	2 h 18 min	Selected territories	Japanese	
Dynasty Warriors	April 29, 2021	Period action	1 h 57 min	Selected territories	Cantonese	
The Water Man	May 7, 2021	Adventure drama	1 h 33 min	Worldwide except the United States	English	
Riverdance: The Animated Adventure	May 28, 2021	CGI animation musical fantasy	1 h 33 min	Selected territories	English	
Live is Life	June 3, 2021	Drama	1 h 49 min	Selected territories	Spanish	
Rurouni Kenshin: The Beginning	June 4, 2021	Period action	2 h 17 min	Selected territories	Japanese	
Two	June 5, 2021	Thriller	1 h 11 min	Selected territories	Spanish	
Security	June 7, 2021	Mystery	1 h 58 min	Selected territories	Italian	
Mobile Suit Gundam: Hathaway	June 11, 2021	Anime	1 h 35 min	Selected territories	Japanese	
Fatherhood	June 18, 2021	Comedy drama	1 h 50 min	Worldwide except China	English	
In for a Murder	June 18, 2021	Drama	1 h 45 min	Selected territories	Polish	
Je suis Karl	June 19, 2021	Drama	2 h 6 min	Selected territories	German	
The Seven Deadly Sins: Cursed by Light	July 2, 2021	Anime	1 h 19 min	All other markets except the United States	Japanese	
Gunpowder Milkshake	July 14, 2021	Action thriller	1 h 54 min	United States, Canada and the Nordics	English	
The Guide to the Perfect Family	July 14, 2021	Comedy drama	1 h 42 min	Worldwide except Quebec	French	
Prayers for the Stolen	July 15, 2021	Drama	1 h 50 min	North and Latin America except Mexico and Brazil, the Caribbean, the CIS and Europe except France, the United Kingdom, Ireland, the Benelux, Greece, Cyprus, Switzerland, Italy, Vatican City, San Marino, Malta, Serbia, Monaco, North Macedonia, Liechtenstein, Bosnia & Herzegovina and Montenegro	Spanish	
The Summit of the Gods	July 15, 2021	Animated adventure drama	1 h 35 min	Worldwide except the Benelux, China, France, Monaco, Japan and South Korea	French	
Green Snake	July 20, 2021	Animated fantasy adventure	2 h 13 min	Selected territories	Mandarin	
Meskina	July 22, 2021	Romantic comedy	1 h 38 min	Selected territories	Dutch	
Words Bubble Up Like Soda Pop	July 22, 2021	Anime	1 h 27 min	Selected territories	Japanese	
The Father Who Moves Mountains	July 23, 2021	Thriller	1 h 49 min	Worldwide except Romania	Romanian	
The Last Letter from Your Lover	July 23, 2021	Romantic drama	1 h 50 min	Worldwide except the United Kingdom, Ireland, France, Malta, Monaco, the Nordics and China	English	
More the Merrier	July 27, 2021	Comedy	1 h 40 min	Selected territories	Spanish	
Vivo	July 30, 2021	CGI animation musical comedy	1 h 39 min	Selected territories	English	
The Trip	July 30, 2021	Horror comedy	1 h 53 min	Selected territories	Norwegian	
Upcoming Summer	July 30, 2021	Drama	1 h 54 min	Selected territories	Mandarin	
My Wonderful Life	August 12, 2021	Drama	1 h 39 min	Selected territories	Polish	
Zero to Hero	August 12, 2021	Drama	1 h 42 min	Selected territories	Mandarin	
Autumn Girl	August 16, 2021	Drama	1 h 45 min	Selected territories	Polish	
The Getaway King	August 18, 2021	Comedy	1 h 40 min	Selected territories	Polish	
After We Fell	September 1, 2021	Drama	1 h 39 min	Selected territories	English	
Parallel Mothers	September 1, 2021	Drama	2 h 3 min	Latin America	Spanish	
The Lost Daughter	September 3, 2021	Drama	2 h 2 min	Worldwide except Africa, Greece, Cyprus, Italy, Vatican City, San Marino, Switzerland, Spain, Portugal, Scandinavia, Iceland, Poland, Slovenia, North Macedonia, Indonesia, South Korea, Mongolia, Cambodia, Macau, Montenegro, the Middle East and Israel	English	
The Catholic School	September 6, 2021	Drama	1 h 46 min	Selected territories	Italian	
The Falls	September 6, 2021	Drama	2 h 9 min	Selected territories	Mandarin	
My Best Friend Anne Frank	September 9, 2021	Drama	1 h 43 min	Selected territories	Dutch	
Copshop	September 10, 2021	Action thriller	1 h 47 min	Selected territories	English	
Spoiled Brats	September 15, 2021	Comedy	1 h 35 min	Selected territories	French	
Still Out of My League	September 16, 2021	Comedy drama	1 h 53 min	Selected territories	Italian	
My Little Pony: A New Generation	September 24, 2021	CGI animation musical fantasy	1 h 31 min	Worldwide except China and Russia	English	
Seal Team	September 25, 2021	CGI animation action adventure	1 h 40 min	Selected territories	English	
Outlaws	September 25, 2021	Action	2 h 10 min	Selected territories	Spanish	
Marilyn's Eyes	October 2, 2021	Comedy drama	1 h 54 min	Selected territories	Italian	
Child of Kamiari Month	October 8, 2021	Anime	1 h 39 min	All other markets	Japanese	
Captain Nova	October 13, 2021	Science fiction	1 h 26 min	Worldwide except the Netherlands	Dutch	
Anne+: The Film	October 14, 2021	Drama	1 h 35 min	Selected territories	Dutch	
Last Man Down	October 19, 2021	Thriller	1 h 27 min	Selected territories	English	
Forever Out of My League	October 20, 2021	Romantic comedy	1 h 40 min	Selected territories	Italian	
Furioza	October 22, 2021	Drama	2 h 19 min	Selected territories	Polish	
Vicky and Her Mystery	October 23, 2021	Drama	1 h 24 min	Selected territories	French	
The Bombardment	October 28, 2021	Historical drama	1 h 39 min	Worldwide except Denmark	Danish	
Operation Mincemeat	November 5, 2021	War drama	2 h 8 min	North and Latin America and the Caribbean	English	
Ghost in the Shell: SAC 2045 Sustainable War	November 12, 2021	Anime/Science fiction	1 h 58 min	Selected territories	Japanese	
A Boy Called Christmas	November 18, 2021	Fantasy	1 h 46 min	Worldwide except the United Kingdom, Ireland, Australia, New Zealand, Germany, Austria, Switzerland, Malta, Monaco, France and China	English	
Donkeyhead	December 1, 2021	Comedy drama	1 h 45 min	Selected territories	English	
The Perfect Family	December 1, 2021	Comedy	1 h 46 min	Selected territories	Spanish	
Mother/Android	December 17, 2021	Drama	1 h 50 min	Selected territories	English	
7 Women and a Murder	December 25, 2021	Murder mystery	1 h 22 min	Selected territories	Italian	
Chief Daddy 2: Going for Broke	January 1, 2022	Comedy	1 h 52 min	Selected territories	English	
See for Me	January 7, 2022	Crime drama	1 h 32 min	Selected territories	English	
Today We Fix the World	January 13, 2022	Comedy	1 h 53 min	Selected territories	Spanish	
Perfect Strangers	January 17, 2022	Comedy	1 h 39 min	Selected territories	Arabic	
Chickenhare and the Hamster of Darkness	January 23, 2022	Animated adventure comedy	1 h 31 min	Selected territories	English	
The Pirates: The Last Royal Treasure	January 26, 2022	Period action	2 h 6 min	Selected territories	Korean	
Off Track	January 28, 2022	Comedy	1 h 48 min	Selected territories	Swedish	
The In Between	February 11, 2022	Science fiction/romance	1 h 57 min	Worldwide except the United States	English	
AI Love You	February 15, 2022	Science fiction/romance	1 h 35 min	Selected territories	Thai	
Nightride	March 4, 2022	Thriller	1 h 37 min	United Kingdom and Ireland	English	
40 Years Young	March 10, 2022	Comedy	1 h 21 min	Selected territories	Spanish	
Rabbit Academy: Mission Eggpossible	March 17, 2022	Animated comedy	1 h 16 min	Selected territories	German	
Code Name: Emperor	March 18, 2022	Thriller	1 h 46 min	Selected territories	Spanish	
Incantation	March 18, 2022	Horror	1 h 50 min	Selected territories	Mandarin	
Too Old for Fairy Tales	March 18, 2022	Comedy	1 h 46 min	Selected territories	Polish	
Watch Out, We're Mad	March 23, 2022	Comedy	1 h 30 min	Selected territories	Italian	
Marmaduke	April 28, 2022	CGI animation comedy	1 h 30 min	Selected territories	English	
Under Her Control	April 29, 2022	Drama	1 h 49 min	Selected territories	Spanish	
Diorama	May 6, 2022	Romantic comedy	1 h 39 min	Selected territories	Swedish	
Reclaim	May 6, 2022	Family drama	2 h 4 min	Selected territories	Mandarin	
Fullmetal Alchemist: The Revenge of Scar	May 20, 2022	Action	2 h 3 min	Selected territories	Japanese	
Mirror, Mirror	May 20, 2022	Comedy	1 h 19 min	Selected territories	Spanish	
Collision	June 16, 2022	Drama	1 h 39 min	Selected territories	English	
Fullmetal Alchemist: The Final Alchemy	June 24, 2022	Action	2 h 21 min	Selected territories	Japanese	
Glamour Girls	June 24, 2022	Drama	2 h	Selected territories	English	
The Man from Toronto	June 24, 2022	Action comedy	1 h 52 min	Worldwide except China	English	
HollyBlood	July 22, 2022	Teen romantic comedy	1 h 27 min	Selected territories	Spanish	
Rogue Agent	July 27, 2022	Drama	1 h 55 min	United Kingdom and Ireland	English	
Warriors of Future	August 5, 2022	Science fiction action	1 h 41 min	Selected territories	Cantonese	
The Violence Action	August 19, 2022	Drama	1 h 51 min	Selected territories	Japanese	
War Sailor	August 24, 2022	Drama	2 h 30 min	Selected territories	Norwegian	(Note: Released on Netflix as a miniseries)
Operation: Nation	September 2, 2022	Comedy	1 h 33 min	Selected territories	Polish	
The Chalk Line	September 9, 2022	Horror	1 h 46 min	Selected territories	Spanish	
Ẹlẹṣin Ọba: The King's Horseman	September 10, 2022	Drama	1 h 36 min	Selected territories	Yoruba	
Devotion	September 12, 2022	Biographical film	2 h 18 min	Selected territories	English	
Johnny	September 12, 2022	Drama	1 h 59 min	Selected territories	Polish	
Hell Dogs	September 16, 2022	Action	2 h 18 min	Selected territories	Japanese	
The Kings of the World	September 21, 2022	Drama	1 h 43 min	The Americas except Colombia and Mexico	Spanish	
God's Crooked Lines	September 22, 2022	Drama	2 h 34 min	Selected territories	Spanish	
Roald Dahl's Matilda the Musical	October 5, 2022	Musical fantasy comedy	1 h 58 min	Worldwide except the United Kingdom and Ireland	English	
Re/Member	October 14, 2022	Horror	1 h 42 min	Selected territories	Japanese	
The Lost Patient	October 21, 2022	Drama	1 h 32 min	Selected territories	French	
Still Time	October 22, 2022	Romantic comedy	1 h 49 min	Selected territories	Italian	
The Abandoned	October 22, 2022	Crime	1 h 44 min	Selected territories	Mandarin	
Viking Wolf	October 23, 2022	Horror	1 h 37 min	Selected territories	Norwegian	
The Post-Truth World	October 28, 2022	Thriller	2 h	Selected territories	Mandarin	
Stromboli	November 3, 2022	Drama	1 h 26 min	Selected territories	Dutch	
Enola Holmes 2	November 4, 2022	Mystery	2 h 9 min	Worldwide except China	English	
Marry My Dead Body	November 17, 2022	Supernatural mystery comedy	2 h 10 min	All other markets	Mandarin	
Narvik	December 15, 2022	War drama	1 h 48 min	Selected territories	Norwegian	
Faithfully Yours	December 22, 2022	Thriller	1 h 35 min	Selected territories	Dutch	
Furies	December 23, 2022	Action-drama	1 h 49 min	Selected territories	Vietnamese	
Bank of Dave	January 16, 2023	Drama	1 h 47 min	Selected territories	English	
Run Rabbit Run	January 19, 2023	Psychological horror	1 h 40 min	Worldwide except the Benelux, Portugal, Eastern Europe, the Baltics, the Middle East, Israel, Latin America, Hong Kong, Macau, India, Pakistan, Bangladesh, Nepal, Bhutan, Sri Lanka, Indonesia, the Philippines, the Caribbean, the Nordics and Taiwan	English	
The Awkward Weekend	January 19, 2023	Comedy	1 h 29 min	Selected territories	Dutch	
Asterix & Obelix: The Middle Kingdom	February 1, 2023	Adventure comedy	1 h 52 min	Selected territories	French	
A Sunday Affair	February 12, 2023	Romantic drama	1 h 36 min	Selected territories	English	
Mixed by Erry	March 2, 2023	Comedy	1 h 50 min	Selected territories	Italian	
¡Que viva México!	March 23, 2023	Comedy	3 h 11 min	Selected territories	Spanish	
Tin & Tina	March 31, 2023	Horror	1 h 59 min	Selected territories	Spanish	
The Village	April 21, 2023	Thriller	2 h	Selected territories	Japanese	
Dream	April 26, 2023	Comedy drama	2 h 5 min	Selected territories	Korean	
Hard Days	May 19, 2023	Drama	1 h 58 min	Selected territories	Japanese	
May December	May 20, 2023	Romantic drama	1 h 53 min	North America	English	
Miss Shampoo	June 22, 2023	Dramedy	2 h	Selected territories	Mandarin	
Ladybug & Cat Noir: The Movie	July 5, 2023	CGI animation adventure action	1 h 40 min	Selected territories	English	
How to Deal With a Heartbreak	July 6, 2023	Dramedy	1 h 42 min	Selected territories	Spanish	
Summer Vacation	July 6, 2023	Comedy	1 h 40 min	Selected territories	Spanish	
Caged Wings	August 25, 2023	Drama	1 h 42 min	Selected territories	Spanish	
The Rope Curse 3	August 25, 2023	Horror	1 h 49 min	Selected territories	Mandarin	
Hit Man	September 5, 2023	Action comedy	1 h 53 min	United States, United Kingdom, Ireland, Australia, New Zealand, India, South Korea, Hong Kong, Malaysia, Vietnam, Indonesia, Singapore, the Philippines, Malta and Iceland	English	
In the Land of Saints and Sinners	September 6, 2023	Thriller	1 h 46 min	United Kingdom and Ireland	English	
Woman of the Hour	September 8, 2023	Crime drama	1 h 34 min	United States, France, Italy, Monaco, San Marino, Vatican City, Andorra, the Benelux, Japan, Macau, South Korea, Switzerland, Hungary, Hong Kong, Romania, Bulgaria, Indonesia, Singapore, the Philippines and the Caribbean	English	
After Everything	September 13, 2023	Romance	1 h 33 min	Selected territories	English	
Maboroshi	September 15, 2023	Anime	1 h 50 min	Selected territories	Japanese	
The Abyss	September 15, 2023	Thriller	1 h 43 min	Selected territories	Swedish	
Women on the Edge	September 21, 2023	Comedy	1 h 34 min	Selected territories	Spanish	
Will	September 27, 2023	Drama	1 h 54 min	Selected territories	Dutch	
Zero to Hero	April 3, 2024	Romantic comedy	1 h 49 min	Selected territories	Portuguese	
The Imaginary	December 15, 2023	Anime	1 h 49 min	Selected territories	Japanese	
Kleks Academy	January 5, 2024	Fantasy	2 h 9 min	Selected territories	Polish	
Golden Kamuy	January 19, 2024	Action	2 h 7 min	Selected territories	Japanese	
Too Old for Fairy Tales 2	March 15, 2024	Comedy	1 h 35 min	Selected territories	Polish	
Emilia Pérez	May 18, 2024	Musical crime comedy	2 h 12 min	North America, the United Kingdom, Ireland, the Caribbean and Malta	Spanish	
Transmitzvah	May 18, 2024	Comedy	1 h 40 min	Selected territories	Spanish	
Wonderland	June 5, 2024	Science fiction/romance	1 h 53 min	Worldwide except South Korea	Korean	
Mononoke the Movie: The Phantom in the Rain	July 26, 2024	Anime	1 h 31 min	Worldwide except Japan	Japanese	
I Can't Live Without You	August 16, 2024	Comedy	1 h 38 min	Selected territories	Spanish	
Bogota: City of the Lost	October 3, 2024	Crime drama	1 h 48 min	Selected territories	Korean	
Number 24	October 22, 2024	Period drama	1 h 51 min	Selected territories	Norwegian	
Bank of Dave 2: The Loan Ranger	January 5, 2025	Drama	1 h 43 min	Selected territories	English	
Bad Influence	January 21, 2025	Thriller	1 h 46 min	Selected territories	Spanish	
The Rose of Versailles	January 31, 2025	Anime	1 h 53 min	Selected territories	Japanese	
Mononoke the Movie: The Ashes of Rage	March 14, 2025	Anime	1 h 14 min	Worldwide except Japan	Japanese	
Left-Handed Girl	May 15, 2025	Drama	1 h 49 min	Worldwide except the Baltics, Benelux, Greece, Hong Kong, Israel, Italy, France, Japan, South Korea, Spain, Scandinavia, Poland and Taiwan	Mandarin	
Nouvelle Vague	May 17, 2025	Period comedy drama	1 h 46 min	Selected territories	French	
I Am Frankelda	June 5, 2025	Stop motion animated dark fantasy musical	1 h 43 min	Worldwide except Mexico	Spanish	
Queen of Coal	June 12, 2025	Drama	1 h 33 min	Selected territories	Spanish	
The Orphans	August 20, 2025	Action thriller	1 h 35 min	Selected territories	French	
In the Hand of Dante	September 3, 2025	Drama	2 h 30 min	Selected territories	English	
Sacrifice	September 6, 2025	Action-adventure comedy	1 h 44 min	Selected territories	English	
Even If This Love Disappears From the World Tonight	December 24, 2025	Romance	1 h 45 min	Selected territories	Korean	
A Father's Miracle	December 25, 2025	Drama	1 h 41 min	Selected territories	Spanish	
To the Max	February 4, 2026	Drama	1 h 53 min	Selected territories	Spanish	
Humint	February 11, 2026	Action	1 h 59 min	Worldwide except South Korea	Korean	
Strangers in the Park	February 19, 2026	Comedy	1 h 55 min	Selected territories	Spanish	
Golden Kamuy −The Abashiri Prison Raid−	March 13, 2026	Action	2 h 2 min	Selected territories	Japanese	
Son-in-Law	April 18, 2026	Comedy	1 h 42 min	Selected territories	Spanish	
Desire	May 7, 2026	Thriller	1 h 37 min	Selected territories	Spanish	
In Waves	May 13, 2026	Animation	1 h 31 min	Selected territories	English	
Gentle Monster	May 14, 2026	Thriller	1 h 54 min	Selected territories	German	
La bola negra	May 21, 2026	Drama	2 h 39 min	United States and Canada	Spanish	
Susana and Elvira: No Plan B	May 28, 2026	Comedy	1 h 53 min	Selected territories	Spanish	
Mononoke the Movie: The Curse of the Serpent	May 29, 2026	Anime	1 h 27 min	Worldwide except Japan	Japanese	
Wild Sing	June 3, 2026	Comedy	1 h 47 min	Worldwide except South Korea	Korean	
Here the Whole Time	June 9, 2026	Comedy	1 h 40 min	Selected territories	Portuguese	
23,000 Lives	July 2, 2026	Drama	1 h 52 min	Selected territories	German	
Ink	September 2, 2026	Drama	1h 56 min	United States and Latin America	English	

== Documentaries ==
Title	Runtime	Netflix exclusive region	Language	Notes
Art of Conflict: The Murals of Northern Ireland	1 h 13 min	Selected territories	English	
Camp Confidential: America's Secret Nazis	35 min	Selected territories	English	
DEVO	1 h 30 min	Selected territories	English	
Dying to Tell	1 h 28 min	Worldwide except Spain	Spanish	
E-Team	1 h 30 min	Selected territories	English	
Free Leonard Peltier	2 h	Selected territories	English	
In Waves and War	1 h 47 min	Selected territories	English	
Misha and the Wolves	1 h 29 min	Selected territories	English	
Mission Blue	1 h 35 min	Selected territories	English	
Mitt	1 h 32 min	Selected territories	English	
Print the Legend	1 h 40 min	Selected territories	English	
Ratones Paranoicos: The Band that Rocked Argentina	1 h 16 min	Selected territories	Spanish	
Sangre del Toro	1 h 25 min	Selected territories	English	
Snelle: Without a Coat	1 h 29 min	The Netherlands and Belgium	Dutch	
Suzan & Freek: Between You & Me	1 h 30 min	The Netherlands and Belgium	Dutch	
Teenage Wasteland	1 h 50 min	Selected territories	English	
The Short Game	1 h 39 min	Selected territories	English	
The Battered Bastards of Baseball	1 h 13 min	Selected territories	English	
The Bend in the River	1 h 22 min	Selected territories	English	
The Square	1 h 44 min	Selected territories	Arabic	
The White House Effect	1 h 34 min	Selected territories	English	
This 15 Me	1 h 53 min	Selected territories	Filipino	
Virunga	1 h 40 min	Selected territories	English	
Wonder Boy	1 h 39 min	Selected territories	French	

== Specials ==
Title	Genre	Runtime	Netflix exclusive region	Language	Notes
Bill Burr: You People Are All the Same	Stand-up comedy	1 h 8 min	Selected territories	English	
Bill Burr: I'm Sorry You Feel That Way	Stand-up comedy	1 h 20 min	Selected territories	English	
Chelsea Handler: Uganda Be Kidding Me Live	Stand-up comedy	1 h 11 min	Selected territories	English	
Chelsea Peretti: One of the Greats	Stand-up comedy	1 h 14 min	Selected territories	English	
Craig Ferguson: I'm Here to Help	Stand-up comedy	1 h 21 min	Selected territories	English	
Derren Brown: Miracle	Mentalism special	1 h 13 min	Selected territories	English	
Derren Brown: Sacrifice	Mentalism special	49 min	Selected territories	English	
Derren Brown: The Push	Mentalism special	1 h 9 min	Selected territories	English	
Especial de Ano Todo com Clarice Falcão	Stand-up comedy	1 h 1 min	Selected territories	Portuguese	
FIFA Women's World Cup 2027 Final Draw	Sporting event	TBA	Selected territories	English	
Frankie Boyle: Hurt Like You've Never Been Loved	Stand-up comedy	1 h 4 min	Selected territories	English	
Iliza Shlesinger: War Paint	Stand-up comedy	1 h 15 min	Selected territories	English	
Jim Jefferies: Bare	Stand-up comedy	1 h 16 min	Selected territories	English	
John Hodgman: Ragnarok	Stand-up comedy	1 h 7 min	Selected territories	English	
Kevin Hart: What Now?	Stand-up comedy concert film	1 h 36 min	Worldwide except United States	English	
Mike Birbiglia: My Girlfriend's Boyfriend	Stand-up comedy	1 h 15 min	Selected territories	English	
Modest Heroes: Ponoc Short Films Theater	Anime	51 min	Selected territories outside North America	Japanese	
My Little Pony: A New Generation: Sing-Along	Animated musical fantasy	1 h 31 min	Selected territories	English	
Nick Offerman: American Ham	Stand-up comedy	1 h 19 min	Selected territories	English	
Octonauts & the Caves of Sac Actun	Animation	1 h 12 min	Selected territories	English	
Octonauts & the Great Barrier Reef	Animation	47 min	Selected territories	English	
Octonauts & the Ring of Fire	Animation	1 h 20 min	Selected territories	English	
Pokémon: The Arceus Chronicles	Anime	1 h 3 min	Selected territories	Japanese	
Ricardo O'Farrill: Abrazo genial	Stand-up comedy	1 h 32 min	Selected territories	Spanish	
Russell Peters: Notorious	Stand-up comedy	1 h 11 min	Selected territories	English	
Salvador Martinha: Tip of the Tongue	Stand-up comedy	1 h 5 min	Selected territories	Portuguese	
Sofía Niño de Rivera: Exposed	Stand-up comedy	1 h 20 min	Selected territories	Spanish	
Two Distant Strangers	Short film drama	32 min	Selected territories	English	
Violet Evergarden: Recollections	Anime	1 h 35 min	Selected territories	Japanese	
WWE NXT Halloween Havoc 2026	Professional wrestling	2 h 58 min	Selected territories	English	
WWE NXT Heatwave 2026	Professional wrestling event	2 h 58 min	Selected territories	English	
