= Third eye (disambiguation) =

The third eye is a spiritual concept associated with enlightenment and direct communication with a higher plane of existence.

Third eye may also refer to:

== Biology ==
- Parietal eye or a third eye
- Pineal gland or the third eye, a gland found in the brain of most vertebrates

== Film ==
- The Third Eye (serial), a 1920 film serial
- The Third Eye (1929 film), a British film by Maclean Rogers
- The Third Eye (1966 film) or Il terzo occhio, an Italian film by Mino Guerrini
- Third Eye (2014 film), a Philippine horror film by Aloy Adlawan
- The 3rd Eye (2017 film), an Indonesian horror film
  - The 3rd Eye 2, a 2019 sequel
- Teesri Aankh (1982 film), or The Third Eye, a 1982 Indian action-drama film
- Teesri Aankh: The Hidden Camera, or The Third Eye, a 2006 Indian action-techno thriller film
- Trinetra (lit. 'Third Eye'), a 1991 Indian film
- Trinetrudu (lit. 'Third Eye'), a 1988 Indian Telugu-language film by A. Kodandarami Reddy

== Television ==
- The Third Eye (American TV series), a Nickelodeon TV series
- The Third Eye (Norwegian TV series), a 2014–2016 crime drama
- Third Eye (2012 TV series), a Philippine horror fantasy series

== Literature ==
- The Third Eye (Rampa book), a 1956 book by Lobsang Rampa
- The Third Eye (novel), a 1991 novel by Lois Duncan

== Music ==
=== Albums ===
- Third Eye (Ben Allison album) (1999)
- Third Eye (Redd Kross album)
- Third Eye (Monsoon album)
- The Third Eye, an album by Cherry Filter

=== Songs ===
- "The Third Eye", a song by the Pillows from My Foot
- "Third Eye", a song by Black Eyed Peas from Elephunk
- "Third Eye", a 2018 song by Emma Blackery
- "Third Eye", a 2015 song by Florence + The Machine from How Big, How Blue, How Beautiful
- "The Third Eye", a 1970 song by Gypsy from Gypsy
- "The Third Eye", a song by Roy Ayers from Everybody Loves the Sunshine
- "The Third Eye", a song by Nine Miles from Solomonic Polar Bear
- "Third Eye", a 1996 song by Tool from Ænima

== Other uses ==
- Third Eye (podcast), 2023 fantasy podcast
- Third eye, a bicycle front derailleur add-on
- The Third Eye (Le Troisième Oeil), a collection of paintings by Marcel Marceau
- Third Eye Shoppe, Portland, Oregon, U.S.
- The Third Eye (book) a 2026 book of photographs by George Harrison

== See also ==
- Third Eye Blind, an American alternative rock band
- Teesri Aankh (disambiguation), Hindi for third eye
