= Out of My League =

Out of My League may refer to:

- Out of My League (song), a song recorded by American band Fitz and the Tantrums
- Out of My League (film), a 2020 Italian romantic comedy-drama film by Alice Filippi
