= Mark of the Devil =

Mark of the Devil may refer to:

- Mark of the Devil (1970 film), a 1970 West German film
- Mark of the Devil (2020 film), a 2020 Mexican film
