= Teesri Aankh =

Teesri Aankh may refer to:

- Third eye (disambiguation), in Hindi
- Teesri Aankh (1982 film), an Indian Hindi-language film
- Teesri Aankh: The Hidden Camera, a 2006 Indian Hindi-language film
