= Live Is Life (film) =

- Directed by: Dani de la Torre
- Written by: Albert Espinosa
- Produced by: Toni Novella
- Starring: Adrián Baena; Juan del Pozo; Raúl del Pozo; David Rodríguez; Javier Casellas
- Cinematography: Josu Inchaustegui
- Music by: Manuel Riveiro
- Production companies: Atresmedia Cine; 4 Cats Pictures; Life is life AIE
- Distributed by: Warner Bros. Pictures Spain
- Release dates: 6 June 2021 (Málaga); 3 June 2022 (Spain)
- Running time: 109 minutes
- Country: Spain
- Language: Spanish

Live Is Life is a 2021 Spanish adventure comedy-drama film directed by Dani de la Torre and written by Albert Espinosa which stars Adrián Baena, Juan del Pozo, Raúl del Pozo, David Rodríguez, and Javier Casellas.

== Synopsis ==
In 1985, five friends plan to escape on midsummer's night to look for a flower that, according to legend, has magical powers.

== Cast ==
- Adrián Baena as Rodri
- Juan del Pozo as Álvaro
- Raúl del Pozo as Maza
- David Rodríguez as Suso
- Javier Casellas as Garriga

== Production ==
The film is an Atresmedia Cine, 4 Cats Pictures and Life is life AIE production. Shooting locations included the south of the province of Lugo (Pantón, Sober, Quiroga, O’Saviñao, Monforte de Lemos) and the province of Ourense (Esgos).

== Release ==
The film had its official premiere at the 24th Málaga Film Festival on 6 June 2021. Although the national theatrical release in Spain was on August 13, it was later delayed to November 5 due to the complications of the theatrical releases by the COVID-19 pandemic. Finally, it had to be postponed again to 3 June 2022. It was distributed by Warner Bros. Pictures Spain. It was later released in some territories on Netflix in July 2022.

== Reception ==
In the newspaper El Mundo, Javier Estrada said it is "an adventure film that can almost be interpreted as Goonies in Spain". In Movie Nation, Roger Moore rated it 2/4 stars saying that it's "original only in the number of movies it cribs from. But it isn’t Stand By Me, it’s not really Five Teens and a Baby, and it sure as shooting isn’t Goonies.

In his review in Escribiendo Cine, Juan Pablo Russo gave it a 6/10 rating saying that "De la Torre, a filmmaker accustomed to action and thrillers, steps out of his comfort zone and imbues his film with a bittersweet adventurous tone creating an effective melodrama" In the newspaper A Gazeta (Brazil), Rafael Braz said that "it is interesting how Live is Life uses clichés in an intelligent way to create good dramas".

In Common Sense Media, Brian Costello said that "this is an engaging coming-of-age dramedy with enough story and acting talent to overcome the familiar aspects to this 'hero's journey'."

== See also ==
- List of films impacted by the COVID-19 pandemic
- List of Spanish films of 2022
- List of Netflix exclusive international distribution films
- List of coming-of-age stories
