= Jenny De Nucci =

Italian actress (born 2000)

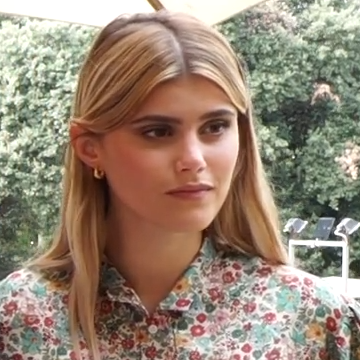
- Jenny De Nucci in 2021
- Born: Jennifer Claudia De Nucci; 27 May 2000 (age 26); Garbagnate Milanese, Milan, Lombardy, Italy
- Education: Catholic University of the Sacred Heart (degree in Communication Sciences)
- Occupation: Actress
- Years active: 2017–present
- Height: 1.68 m (5 ft 6.14 in)

Jennifer Claudia De Nucci (born 27 May 2000), known as Jenny De Nucci, is an Italian actress.

== Biography ==
Born in Garbagnate Milanese but raised in Limbiate, she began her career in 2017 by participating in the first season of the reality show Il collegio. In 2019, she starred in the sixth season of the television series Un passo dal cielo, playing the role of Isabella Ferrante. Subsequently, in 2020, she appeared in the twelfth season of Don Matteo, where she played the character of Alice Videtti.

In 2021, she made her film debut playing the role of Rebecca in the film Still Out of My League (Ancora più bello) and in the same year, she made her voice acting debut in Sing 2, where she lent her voice to Porsha Crystal. Over the years, she has participated in several other film productions, including Prima di andare via (2023) and Phobia (2023) in leading roles, as well as the films Ragazzaccio (2022), Lo sposo indeciso che non poteva o forse non voleva più uscire dal bagno (2023), Still Fabulous (Pensati sexy) (2024) and La Dolce Villa (2025).

== Filmography ==
=== Film ===
Year	Title	Role(s)	Notes
2019	Happy Birthday	Sara	Short film
2021	Still Out of My League	Rebecca	
2021	Forever Out of My League	Rebecca	
2021	Sing 2	Porsha Crystal (voice)	Italian dub
2022	Ragazzaccio	Lucia Roncucci	
2023	Prima di andare via	Giulia	
2023	Phobia	Chiara	
2023	Lo sposo indeciso che non poteva o forse non voleva più uscire dal bagno	Daniela	
2024	Still Fabulous	Lara	
2025	Ti respiro	Mila	Short film
2025	La Dolce Villa	Donata	
2026	Prendiamoci una pausa	Benedetta	
2026	Bæ †	TBA	Post-production

=== Television ===
Year	Title	Role(s)	Notes
2017	Il collegio	Herself / Contestant	Season 1
2019–2021	Un passo dal cielo	Isabella Ferrante	Main role (seasons 5-6)
2020	Don Matteo	Alice Videtti	2 episodes
2023	Monterossi	Greta De Santis	2 episodes
2023	Back to School	Herself / Contestant	Season 2
2023	I Hate Christmas	Stella	Recurring role

=== Music videos ===
Year	Title	Artist(s)	Notes
2021	"Mille guerre"	Ariete	

== Discography ==
=== Singles ===
- 2018 – Stupidah Braies (with Beatrice Arnera and Pilar Fogliati)

== Works ==
- De Nucci, Jenny (2019). Girls. Siamo tutte regine (in Italian). De Agostini. ISBN 978-8851168223.

== Awards ==
Year	Award	Category	Result	Notes
2018	Salerno Film Festival	Special Recognition "for a Brilliant Debut in Entertainment"	Won	
2019	Giffoni Film Festival	Explosive Talent Award	Won	
