= Eagle Pictures =

Italian film distribution and production company

Eagle Pictures S.p.A.
- Type: Società per azioni (S.p.A.)
- Industry: Entertainment
- Founded: 1986; 40 years ago
- Founder: Ciro Dammicco; Stefano Dammicco
- Headquarters: Rome, Italy
- Owner: Quinta Communications
- Subsidiaries: Blu Yazmine; Eagle Home Video; M2 Pictures
- Website: eaglepictures.com

Eagle Pictures S.p.A. is an Italian film distribution and production company. It is Italy's leading independent film distributor.

== History ==
Eagle Pictures was founded by Ciro and Stefano Dammicco in 1986. Producer Tarak Ben Ammar acquired a controlling interest in the company in late 2007.

In late 2018, Eagle Pictures established a film and television production division, having previously produced Paolo and Vittorio Taviani's The Lark Farm (2007) and Edoardo De Angelis's Mozzarella Stories (2011). It had also acted as a line producer during the Italian shoots of Kingsman: The Secret Service (2014), Point Break (2015), Kingsman: The Golden Circle (2017), and 6 Underground (2019).

In January 2020, Eagle Pictures entered into a distribution agreement with Paramount Pictures, after their deal with 20th Century Fox expired earlier that month. In February 2021, Eagle entered into a home entertainment distribution agreement with Sony Pictures. The following year, it also entered into a production and distribution agreement with Sony, effective in 2023.

In June 2023, Eagle Pictures announced that they would be investing between €40 and 50 million in the construction of new film studios in Rome.

=== Mergers and acquisitions ===
In July 2020, Eagle Pictures acquired distributor M2 Pictures for around €8.5 million. In August 2022, it acquired 302 Original Content, a film and television production startup company; it was later renamed to Eagle Original Content. In March 2023, Eagle Pictures merged with 3 Marys Entertainment. Later that year, it acquired Blu Yazmine, a production company specializing in unscripted television.

== Production credits ==
=== Film ===
Year	Title	Director	Notes	Ref.
2004	The Lazarus Child	Graham Theakston		
2007	The Lark Farm	Paolo and Vittorio Taviani	Co-produced with Ager 3, Rai Cinema, France 2 Cinéma, and Istituto Luce	
2010	Basilicata Coast to Coast	Rocco Papaleo		
2011	Mozzarella Stories	Edoardo De Angelis		
2020	Un figlio di nome Erasmus	Alberto Ferrari	Co-produced with Vivi Film Portugal	
2020	Out of My League	Alice Filippi		
2021	Still Out of My League	Claudio Norza	Co-produced with Weekend Films	
2022	Backstage - Dietro le quinte	Cosimo Alemà		
2022	The Bunker Game	Roberto Zazzara	Co-produced with Be Cool Produzioni	
2022	Dampyr	Riccardo Chemello	Co-produced with Sergio Bonelli Editore and Brandon Box	
2022	Forever Out of My League	Claudio Norza		
2022	Lyle, Lyle, Crocodile	Will Speck and Josh Gordon	Co-produced with Columbia Pictures	
2022	L'uomo sulla strada	Gianluca Mangiasciutti		
2023	Da grandi	Fausto Brizzi		
2023	The Equalizer 3	Antoine Fuqua	Co-produced with Columbia Pictures and Escape Artists	
2023	Hotspot - Amore senza rete	Giulio Manfredonia	Co-produced with Sony Pictures International Productions	
2024	The Boy with Pink Pants	Margherita Ferri	Co-produced with Weekend Films	
2024	Il corpo	Vincenzo Alfieri	Co-produced with Sony Pictures International Productions	
2024	How Kids Roll	Loris Lai	Co-produced with Jean Vigo Italia, Lawrence Bender Productions, Potemkino, and Rai Cinema	
2025	Get Help	Tiziano Russo		
2025	Leopardi & Co	Federica Biondi		
2025	40 secondi	Vincenzo Alfieri		
2025	Squali	Daniele Barbiero		
2026	The City of the Living	Edoardo Gabbriellini	Co-produced with Cinemaundici, Lungta Film	

=== Television ===
Year	Title	Network	Notes	Ref.
2018	The Truth About the Harry Quebert Affair	Epix	Co-produced with MGM Television, Muse Entertainment, Old Friends Productions, Barbary Films, and Repērage	
2024	Gloria	Rai 1	Co-produced with Rai Fiction	
2024	Sul più bello - La serie	Amazon Prime Video		
