= Ragazzaccio =

2022 Italian drama film by Paolo Ruffini

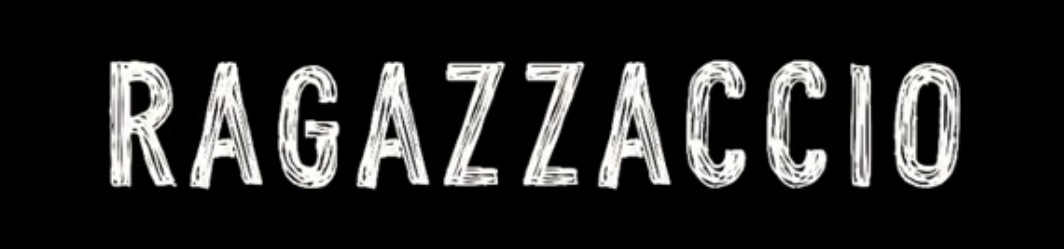
- Film logo
- Directed by: Paolo Ruffini
- Written by: Paolo Ruffini
- Produced by: Santo Versace; Gianluca Curti; Paolo Ruffini; Nicola Nocella
- Starring: Beppe Fiorello; Massimo Ghini; Sabrina Impacciatore; Alessandro Bisegna; Jenny De Nucci
- Cinematography: Tani Canevari
- Edited by: Claudio Di Mauro; Carlo Balestrieri
- Music by: Claudia Campolongo; Gianluca Sambataro
- Production companies: Vera Film; Minerva Pictures
- Distributed by: Adler Entertainment
- Release date: 2022
- Running time: 100 minutes
- Country: Italy
- Language: Italian

Ragazzaccio (lit. 'Bad Boy') is a 2022 Italian drama film directed by Paolo Ruffini.

The film is produced by Vera Film with Minerva Pictures, Simone Valenza and the National Association of Technological Addictions Di.Te. by Giuseppe Lavenia.

== Plot ==
Mattia Silvetti is an 18-year-old who intolerant of rules. He attends high school and is once again at risk of flunking out because of his attitude in class, which often leads to him being thrown out. In his mind, the nightmare of flunking out is heavier than the pandemic that is going to stall Italy.

In March 2020, the lockdown starts and it is no longer possible to go out. Cinzia, his mother, stays impatiently locked in the house, while his father, Piero, is a nurse forced to work exhausting shifts at the hospital. Mattia finds himself locked in the silence of his room between video calls and distance learning lessons in which he continues to play bully pranks on teachers and classmates.

In this situation Mattia discovers love. He does so by getting to know Lucia, the school representative of the high school next to his school, through social networks. He also learns love and self-respect thanks to the interest of Professor Roncucci, who offers to give him private tuition: 'If you study, you become better, you live better, you fall in love better', he tells him.

Once he discovers that his mother is having an extramarital affair, he also rediscovers love for his parents: for his father, who falls ill with COVID-19 during hospital shifts, and for his mother, who lives crushed between her hypochondria and forced cohabitation.

One morning Mattia commits an act of cyberbullying against Zoli, a disabled classmate. At that moment he hits rock bottom and manages to climb back up thanks to the power of love that makes him want to grow deeper. Despite a three-week suspension against him, that is synonymous with flunking out, the Italian Government decides to promote all students forced to take classes from home by the health emergency. At the end of the school year, it will be he himself, in a letter to the President of the Republic Sergio Mattarella, who will ask to be flunked, asking to be able to relive with greater awareness a year that was fundamental to his growth.

== Cast ==
- Alessandro Bisegna as Mattia Silvetti
- Jenny De Nucci as Lucia Roncucci
- Beppe Fiorello as Professor Roncucci
- Massimo Ghini as Piero Silvetti
- Sabrina Impacciatore as Cinzia Silvetti
- Claudia Campolongo as Professor Molinari
- Maurizio Lops as Professor Mascheroni
- Adriano Occulto as Gabriele Deodato
- Iacopo Melio as Zoli

== Release ==
The film premiered on 24 July 2022 at the Giffoni Film Festival and was released in Italian cinemas on 3 November 2022 by Adler Entertainment.
