= Ludovica Francesconi =

Italian actress (born 1999)

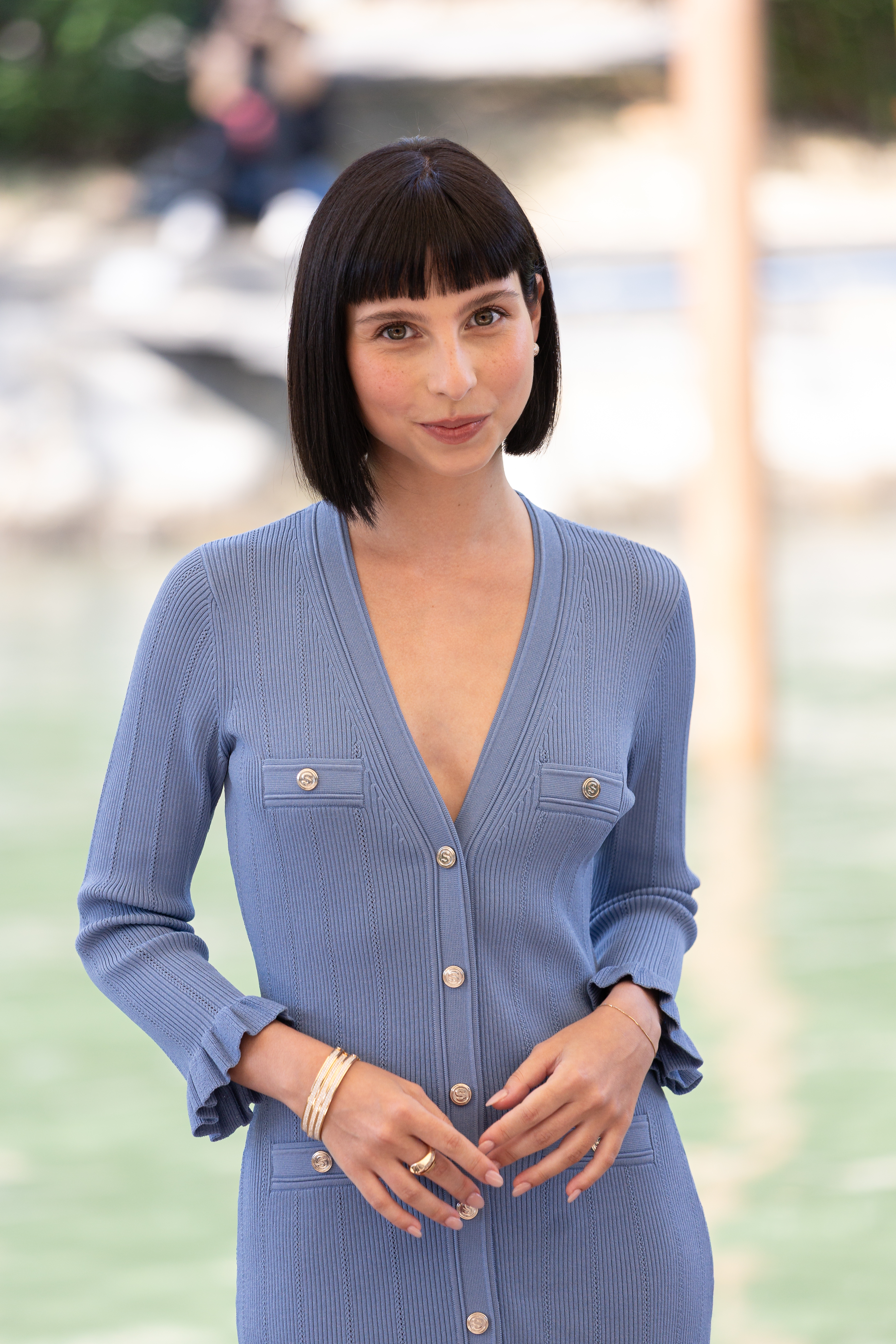
- Francesconi at 81st Venice International Film Festival in 2024
- Born: 27 July 1999 (age 26); Sora, Lazio, Italy
- Occupation: Actress
- Height: 1.59 m (5 ft 2.60 in)
- Relatives: Ginevra Francesconi (sister)

Ludovica Francesconi (born 27 July 1999) is an Italian actress.

== Early life ==
Born in 1999 in Sora, in the province of Frosinone, to mother Sonia Lupo and father Fabrizio Francesconi, Ludovica has cultivated a passion for acting since she was little and is the older sister of Ginevra, also an actress.

== Career ==
Francesconi approached acting and theatre since she was a child. After a specific course, she dedicated herself to various training courses, practicing classical dance and playing the piano. In 2012 she acted in the play Alice nel paese delle meraviglie, in the role of Alice. From 2013 to 2015 she acted in the play La giara, in the role of Carminella, and later in L'importanza di chiamarsi Ernesto, in the role of Cecily.

In 2020, she played the protagonist Marta in the film Out of My League (Sul più bello), directed by Alice Filippi and presented at the 50th edition of the Giffoni Film Festival. The following year, in 2021, she starred in the sequels to the latter film, Still Out of My League (Ancora più bello) and Forever Out of My League (Sempre più bello), both directed by Claudio Norza. Meanwhile, she is attending a degree program in Literature, Music, and Entertainment in Rome. In 2024 she played the role of Annita in the series La Storia, that of Marta in the series Sul più bello – La serie and that of Lilli in the film Una terapia di gruppo directed by Paolo Costella.

== Filmography ==
=== Film ===
Year	Title	Role	Notes
2017	Influence	Ludovica	Short film
2019	Anima nera	Flavia	Short film
2020	Out of My League	Marta	
2021	Still Out of My League	Marta	
2021	Forever Out of My League	Marta	
2024	Una terapia di gruppo	Lilli	

=== Television ===
Year	Title	Role	Notes
2018	Love Dilemma	Martina	TV series, episode "La prima volta"
2024	La Storia	Annita	TV series, 2 episodes
2024	Sul più bello – La serie	Marta	TV series, 6 episodes

== Theater ==
Year	Title	Role
2012	Alice nel paese delle meraviglie – Il musical	Alice
2013–2015	La giara	Carminella
2016	L'importanza di chiamarsi Ernesto	Cecily

== Commercials ==
- Bauli croissant (2018)

== Awards ==
Year	Award	Category	Work	Result
2020	RB Casting Award	Best New Actress, within the Alice nella Città Section	Out of My League	Won
2021	Revelation of the Year Award	RdC Awards, awarded by Cinematografo	Herself	Won
2021	Festival Primo Piano, Planet Woman – MYmovie	Best actress	Herself	Won
2021	Nastri d'Argento 75th edition	Biraghi Award for Young Talent	Herself	Won
