= Forever Out of My League =

2021 Italian film by Claudio Norza

- Italian: Sempre più bello
- Directed by: Claudio Norza
- Written by: Roberto Proia; Michela Straniero
- Produced by: Roberto Proia
- Starring: Ludovica Francesconi; Giancarlo Commare; Jozef Gjura; Gaja Masciale; Jenny De Nucci; Diego Giangrasso; Drusilla Foer
- Cinematography: Emanuele Pasquet
- Edited by: Claudio Semboloni
- Music by: Enrico Gabrielli
- Production company: Eagle Pictures
- Distributed by: Eagle Pictures; Netflix
- Release dates: 20 October 2021 (Rome); 31 January 2022 (Italy)
- Running time: 100 minutes
- Country: Italy
- Language: Italian

Forever Out of My League (Italian: Sempre più bello) is a 2021 Italian romantic comedy-drama film directed by Claudio Norza. It is the final film in a trilogy, following Out of My League (2020) and Still Out of My League (2021). It premiered on 20 October 2021 at the Rome Film Festival and was released in Italian cinemas on 31 January 2022.

== Premise ==
Marta's lung transplant interrupts her plans to live with Gabriele. After the two finally move in together, Marta's health declines. Gabriele attempts to mend Marta's relationship with her grandmother.

== Cast ==
- Ludovica Francesconi as Marta
- Giancarlo Commare as Gabriele
- Jozef Gjura as Jacopo
  - Christian Nerone as young Jacopo
- Gaja Masciale as Federica
  - Demo Viola as young Federica
- Jenny De Nucci as Rebecca
- Diego Giangrasso as Dario
- Drusilla Foer as Marta's grandmother
- Désirée Giorgetti as Silvia
- Monica Dugo as Gabriele's mother
- Elia Tedesco as Vittorio
- Riccardo Niceforo as Giacomo
- Angelica Giusto as Cristina
- Carola Campana as Rebecca's mother
- Alberto Barbi as Rebecca's father
- Angelica D'Ettorre as Zoe
- Massimo Valz Brenta as Gabriele's father

== Production ==
The film and its predecessor, Still Out of My League, were filmed in three months in Turin.

== Reception ==
Jade Budowski of Decider stated that, "While three movies with these characters have certainly allowed us to develop some fondness for them, Forever Out of My League fails to make any lasting impression (much like its predecessors)."
