= Kardec (film) =

Portuguese-language 2019 drama film on Netflix

- Theatrical release poster
- Directed by: Wagner de Assis
- Written by: L.G. Bayão; Wagner de Assis
- Screenplay by: L.G. Bayão; Wagner de Assis
- Based on: Kardec - A Biografia by Marcel Souto Maior
- Produced by: Eliana Soárez
- Starring: Christian Baltauss; Letícia Braga; Sandra Corveloni
- Cinematography: Nonato Estrela
- Music by: Trevor Gureckis
- Production company: Conspiração Filmes
- Distributed by: Sony Pictures (Brazil); Netflix (International)
- Release date: May 16, 2019
- Running time: 110 minutes
- Country: Brazil
- Language: Portuguese

Kardec is a 2019 Brazilian drama film directed by Wagner de Assis and written by L.G. Bayão and Wagner de Assis.

== Plot ==
Hippolyte Léon Denizard Rivail, a French educator who, when studying the phenomenon of “Spinning tables”, discovers that there is the possibility of communicating with the spirits. As an encoder of the Spiritism doctrine, Professor Rivail assumes the pseudonym of Allan Kardec and elaborates, under the guidance of the spirits, the five main books that guide Spiritist studies.

== Cast ==
- Christian Baltauss
- Letícia Braga as Julie
- Sandra Corveloni as Amélie
- Louise D'Tuani as Ermance Dufaux
- Genésio de Barros as Padre Boutin
- Charles Fricks as Charles Baudin
- Julia Konrad as Ruth-Celine
- Leonardo Medeiros as Rivail / Allan Kardec
- Henrique Neves as Cáligrafo
- Guilherme Piva as Didier
- Júlia Svacinna as Caroline
- Guida Vianna as Madame Plainemaison
- Dalton Vigh as Sr. Dufaux

== Production ==
=== Filming ===
The film had a week of filming in Paris and four weeks on locations in Rio de Janeiro. All the scenes in the French capital had digital intervention for the erasure of modern buildings.
