= Still Out of My League =

2021 Italian film by Claudio Norza

- Italian: Ancora più bello
- Directed by: Claudio Norza
- Written by: Roberto Proia; Michela Straniero
- Produced by: Roberto Proia
- Starring: Ludovica Francesconi; Giancarlo Commare; Jozef Gjura; Gaja Masciale; Riccardo Niceforo; Jenny De Nucci; Giuseppe Futia; Diego Giangrasso; Loredana Bertè
- Cinematography: Emanuele Pasquet
- Edited by: Claudio Semboloni
- Music by: Enrico Gabrielli
- Production companies: Eagle Pictures; Weekend Films
- Distributed by: Eagle Pictures; Netflix
- Release dates: 16 September 2021 (Italy); 10 December 2021 (Worldwide)
- Running time: 114 minutes
- Country: Italy
- Language: Italian

Still Out of My League (Italian: Ancora più bello) is a 2021 Italian romantic comedy-drama film directed by Claudio Norza. It is the sequel to the 2020 film Out of My League, and is followed by Forever Out of My League.

== Premise ==
After her breakup with Arturo, Marta swears off relationships. Despite this, she soon finds love in Gabriele, a sweet and sensitive young artist. To make matters more complicated, Gabriele gets transferred to Paris and the two find themselves navigating a long distance relationship.

== Cast ==
- Ludovica Francesconi as Marta
- Giancarlo Commare as Gabriele
- Jozef Gjura as Jacopo
- Gaja Masciale as Federica
- Riccardo Niceforo as Giacomo
- Jenny De Nucci as Rebecca
- Giuseppe Futia as Tommaso
- Diego Giangrasso as Dario
- Loredana Bertè as Delfina Meier

== Production ==
The film and its sequel, Forever Out of My League, were filmed in three months in Turin.

== Reception ==
Jade Budowski of Decider stated that, "Still Out of My League boasts a big heart and a cast full of electrifying chemistry, but the story's lack of focus and lengthy runtime turns the whole thing into a bit of an aimless drag."
