= Mark of the Devil (2020 film) =

- Spanish: La marca del demonio
- Directed by: Diego Cohen
- Written by: Rubén Escalante Méndez
- Produced by: Alvaro Gonzalez Kuhn
- Starring: Eduardo Noriega; Eivaut Rischen; Lumi Cavazos; Nicolasa Ortíz Monasterio; Omar Fierro; Arantza Ruiz
- Cinematography: Aram Díaz
- Music by: Graham Plowman
- Production company: Hakuhn
- Distributed by: Corazón Films
- Release date: 3 January 2020 (Mexico)
- Running time: 82 minutes
- Country: Mexico
- Language: Spanish

Mark of the Devil (Spanish: La marca del demonio) is a 2020 Mexican horror film distributed by Corazón Films, and directed by Diego Cohen. The story revolves around a priest specializing in exorcisms and his adopted son, abandoned during his childhood by a Mennonite group. The life of the exorcists will change when they meet the Cuevas family and face the demon that persecutes the eldest daughter. The film stars Eduardo Noriega.

== Synopsis ==
Thirty years prior to the film's start, a young boy is exorcised by a priest. In modern day a teenage girl named Camila has been possessed after her mother obtained a mysterious tome. Two exorcists, Karl and Tomás, have been dispatched to expel the demon. They are unable to prevent Camila from killing her parents, but the pair do discover that she has been possessed by Cthylla, daughter of Cthulu. As the battle continues, Cthylla splits her spirit and possesses Camila's sister Fernanda. This sparks Karl into further action, revealing that he is possessed by Ythogtha, another child of Cthulu. Unlike his siblings, Ythogtha wants to prevent them from causing chaos in order to rebel against his father. Karl/Ythogtha sucks Cthylla out of Camila's body and begs Tomás to kill him so Cthylla cannot escape. Tomás sadly obliges.

The film ends with Tomás entombing Karl's body and Camila seemingly free of the demon. It is left unclear if Cthylla was cleared from Fernanda's body and if entity will repossess Camila.

== Cast ==
- Eduardo Noriega as Tomás
- Eivaut Rischen as Karl Nüni
  - Diego Escalona Zaragoza as Young Karl
- Lumi Cavazos as Cecilia de la Cueva
- Nicolasa Ortíz Monasterio as Fernanda de la Cueva
- Omar Fierro as Luis Miranda
- Arantza Ruiz as Camila de la Cueva
- Laura de Ita as Esperanza

== Reception ==
The Adelaide Review panned the movie, saying that it "tries desperately hard to be scary, but is spoiled by oodles of clichés, a couple of ludicrous plot turns and an absurd sense of unmitigated seriousness."
