= The 3rd Eye 2 =

2019 Indonesian horror film

- Film poster
- Indonesian: Mata Batin 2
- Directed by: Rocky Soraya
- Written by: Riheam Junianti; Rocky Soraya
- Starring: Jessica Mila; Nabilah Ratna Ayu Azalia; Sophia Latjuba
- Distributed by: Netflix Originals
- Release date: January 17, 2019
- Country: Indonesia
- Language: Indonesian

The 3rd Eye 2 (Indonesian: Mata Batin 2) is a 2019 Indonesian horror film directed by Rocky Soraya and written by Riheam Junianti and Rocky Soraya, and is the sequel to The 3rd Eye from 2017 by the same director and writers.

== Plot ==
The story starts with Alia taking a shower and a ghost observing her from behind. A mysterious ghost called Mirah has been following Alia and her sister Abel for almost a year now. Alia is intrigued by the ghost Mirah and wants to find out more about its past and help it. She learns about psychometry, the ability to see an object's past when in direct skin contact with it, from her spiritual adviser Mrs. Windu. She uses her newly earned psychometric skills to find out Mirah's past from her necklace. Her vision shows a brown-colored mansion too big for a normal family to live in. At the same time, she sees the future with water magic and sees her sister Abel dying. She quickly rushes to Abel but it is too late, she was already dead and Mirah's spirit was standing beside her.

Trying to maintain her calm after Abel's death, Alia volunteers at an orphanage run by Mrs. Lakshmi and Mr. Fadli, a married couple. When she reaches the orphanage she is astonished to see that it is the same mansion she saw in her visions of Mirah's necklace. She meets a teen Nadia who also has an opened third eye which means she can see ghosts both evil and good with her naked eye. She draws them to get them out of her head. Alia and Nadia bond and share each other's secrets. Nadia reminds Alia of her sister Abel which makes her even more close to her. They find out about a girl Darmah who Is locked inside one of the rooms in the mansion. She is a ghost in search of revenge. Alia and Abel unleash her which leads to a string of supernatural havoc at the house. They then communicate with her and find out she wants everyone to know the truth. Mrs.Laksmi reveals that Darmah is her niece and Mirah, her sister. They were found murdered at the same mansion a year ago. Visions seen by Nadia and Alia quickly confirm that Fadli was the one who murdered Mirah and her daughter Darmah who was also his biological daughter because he did not want anyone to find out about his illegitimate daughter and affair with his wife's sister. He did this after Mirah was stubborn to tell everyone the truth. Later it is also revealed that Fadli was the one who killed Abel because he didn't want her to reveal his secrets to his wife- Mrs. Lakshmi. The child ghost Darmah shows this to Alia which makes her go mad at Fadli for killing her beloved sister. There is a scene where Abel appears from heaven and tells Alia to forgive Fadli since revenge is a negative emotion. She comes to her senses and forgives Fadli. Mirah in contrast has gone to heaven as she had left all her negative feelings behind. She begs her daughter to also forgive her father and come to heaven with her, but to no avail. Fadli is killed by Darmah who is in Alia's body. She (Darmah) goes to hell for her sins. Nadia who is in a wounded condition and thus dead, is brought back to life by Abel's touch.

Mrs. Lakshmi sees her sister in a daydream where her sister apologizes to her.

Mrs. Lakshmi gets a delivery which contains an adoption approval letter. She has officially adopted Nadia.

Mrs. Windu comes to the mansion to help Mrs.Laksmi and Nadia manage their third eyes. Mrs.Windu informs Alia about an evil spirit that exists in the mansion because of her being late in closing the portal to the netherworld. Nadia hears a girl's sound asking her to play with her. She goes to the source of the voice only to see the ghost of a girl with a rotten smell indicating it is evil.

== Cast ==
- Jessica Mila as Alia, Abel's elder sister and Mrs. Laksmi's helper in the orphanage
- Nabilah Ratna Ayu Azalia as Nadia, eldest child in the orphanage
- Sophia Latjuba as Mrs. Laksmi, Mr. Fadli's wife, Mirah's elder sister, Darmah's aunt, owner of the orphanage
- Jeremy Thomas as Mr. Fadli, Mrs. Laksmi's husband, Mirah's brother-in-law, Darmah's biological father
- Bianca Hello as Abel, Alia's younger sister
- Citra Prima as Mrs. Windu, Alia's spiritual advisor
- Jelita Callebaut as Mirah, Mrs. Laksmi's younger sister, Mr. Fadli's sister-in-law, Darmah's mother, one of the ghost
- Hadijah Shahab as Darmah, Mrs. Laksmi's niece, Mirah's daughter, one of the ghost
- Nicole Rossi as Rayya, one of the child in the orphanage
- Yasmine Mahya as Malika, one of the child in the orphanage
- Davina Karamoy as Syifa, one of the child in the orphanage
- Eric Kairupan as Ghost, one of the ghost in the orphanage
- Raden Mas Muhammad Araf Sandika Salihin as Ghost, one of the ghost in the orphanage
