= Out of My League (film) =

2020 Italian film by Alice Filippi

- Film poster
- Italian: Sul più bello
- Directed by: Alice Filippi
- Written by: Alice Filippi
- Based on: Sul più bello by Eleonora Gaggero
- Produced by: Roberto Proia
- Starring: Ludovica Francesconi; Giuseppe Maggio; Jozef Gjura; Gaja Masciale; Franco Ravera; Elisabetta Coraini; Michele Franco; Eleonora Gaggero; Edoardo Rossi; Gianni Bissaca; Elia Tedesco
- Cinematography: Emanuele Pasquet
- Edited by: Luciana Pandolfelli
- Music by: Marco Cascone
- Production company: Eagle Pictures
- Distributed by: ADS Service
- Release date: October 17, 2020 (Rome Film Fest)
- Running time: 87 minutes
- Country: Italy
- Language: Italian

Out of My League (Italian: Sul più bello) is a 2020 Italian romantic comedy-drama film written and directed by Alice Filippi, based on the novel of the same name by Eleonora Gaggero, who also takes part in the film in the role of Beatrice. This is the director's debut, as well as the film that marks the film debut of Ludovica Francesconi, Jozef Gjura and Gaja Masciale.

The film is the first in a trilogy, followed by Still Out of My League and Forever Out of My League.

== Plot ==
Marta is a somewhat ugly girl, and aware of that, who lives with her best friends Jacopo and Federica. In addition to being the orphan of both parents, Marta suffers from a severe form of cystic fibrosis, which could kill her very soon since the treatments she is undergoing are not working. However, Marta is not discouraged: after trying in vain to approach a guy on Tinder, the girl is taken by her friends to a party. Here she has love at first sight and falls in love with the beautiful Arturo.

From the next day, Marta begins to follow Arturo everywhere. The girl thinks he hasn't noticed her, but she's wrong: when he goes to ask her why she's following him, however, she has the audacity to ask him for an invitation to dinner, and he accepts. However, when Marta shows up at Arturo's house, the girl discovers that the invitation was actually for a dinner with her whole family: angry, the girl does not spare herself in telling all the strangest details of her life, without doing, however, word of the disease, after which it disappears. Arturo feels guilty, so the next day he shows up at her workplace and asks her for a real date, this time taking her to a fancy restaurant where he usually goes with his family. Marta has the opportunity to change her mind about him: in the end the two find themselves eating simply in the supermarket where Marta works, to end up together in bed at home.

The next morning, Arturo leaves with a bit of embarrassment, but after hearing his mother criticize him for bringing home a girl like Marta, he has no more doubts and decides to ask the girl for another date. Things start to go very well between the two of them, however she does not dare to reveal her health problem to him. However, without saying anything to Arturo, he does not hesitate to invite her for a gondola ride and there he declares his love for her. Marta shouldn't go to damp places because of her illness, but she agrees anyway; however, she immediately felt ill and ran away, only to be hospitalized in critical condition. Marta refuses to let Arturo know the truth, at the cost of leaving him. Marta's doctor informs her that her mistake has accelerated the process and that she has very little life left: the girl is discharged and confronts Arturo, but she pretends not to be in love with him and that she has decided to leave him because of this.

Angry with Marta, that night Arturo goes to a party and kisses Beatrice, but decides not to go any further because he is still in love with Marta. But when she sees Marta leaving the pneumatology department, Beatrice buries the hatchet and reveals exactly what happened the night before, finally convincing her to tell Arturo everything.

Marta then runs to the rowing club and thus manages to reconnect with Arturo. Immediately afterwards she tells him the whole truth, disappointed in him for his silence but also for an intense desire to continue their relationship. The next day, Arturo runs to Marta and reveals that he has discovered a new experimental cure for her illness, which would give her a 19% chance of survival. The boy finally agrees to fulfill another of his fixations: staging his wedding, among other things inviting everyone close to him to the fake ceremony.

== Soundtrack ==
The main theme of the film is the song Sul più bello of the rapper Alfa, which takes its name from the title of the film. Zoe Wees' song Control is also used in a scene in the film.

== Release ==
The film was presented at the Rome Film Fest 2020 on October 17, 2020, and was released in theaters on October 21, 2020. Due to the closure of theaters due to the COVID-19 pandemic, the film was released early in the market on demand, becoming part of the Prime Video offer from January 8, 2021.

== Awards ==
- 2021 – Nastro d'argento

Nomination for Best Comedy

- 2021 – Flaiano Awards
- Audience Award

== Sequels ==
The film has two sequels, Still Out of My League (2021) and Forever Out of My League (2022), both directed by Claudio Norza.
