= The 3rd Eye (2017 film) =

Indonesian 2017 horror film

The 3rd Eye (Mata Batin)
- Directed by: Rocky Soraya
- Written by: Riheam Junianti; Rocky Soraya
- Starring: Jessica Mila; Denny Sumargo; Citra Prima
- Distributed by: Netflix Originals
- Release date: November 30, 2017
- Country: Indonesia
- Language: Indonesian

The 3rd Eye (Indonesian: Mata Batin) is a 2017 Indonesian horror film directed by Rocky Soraya and written by Riheam Junianti and Rocky Soraya. The plot revolves around the young Abel (Bianca Hello) who is seeing mysterious things around her family's home. It was followed by a sequel in 2019, made by the same director/writers.

== Premise ==
The 3rd Eye follows the young Abel (Bianca Hello) who is seeing mysterious things around her family's home. She has a hard time convincing her parents and sister about the sightings though, as they can not see any of the mentioned events themselves. 12 years later, Abel's parents die in a traffic accident and the sisters move back to their old house. In a search for understanding of Abels's ongoing mysterious sightings, the sisters soon learn about "the third eye", a way to see the supernatural world.

== Plot ==
The movie opens with Alia telling her younger 5-year-old sister Abel, that the ghosts she sees and hears are figments of her imagination, but one night a grotesque figure attacks Abel leaving her legs scarred.

10 years later, Alia is a hard-working professional and Abel is an edgy 15 year old teenager who still sees the ghosts of her childhood. When the sisters' parents die in a car accident, they are forced to leave their current home and return to their parents' old estate where Abel had been attacked years earlier. Alia has been dating a photographer named Davin for 8 months now who joins them at the estate. Abel's hallucinations worsen and she tells Alia that the ghost family that occupies the estate doesn't want them to live there. Alia, now excessively worried about Abel's mental health, decides to take her to a psychiatrist. Abel reveals that her mother had taken her to Bu Windu, a spiritual practitioner, and not a psychologist, when she was a kid. They go to Bu Windu who tells Alia about Abel's open third eye. Alia, who doesn't believe in the paranormal, mockingly asks Mrs. Windu to open her third eye. When her third eye is opened she starts witnessing a string of supernatural beings which makes her finally believe Abel's warnings. It becomes apparent that a family of 3 ghosts occupy Alia and Abel's estate, and want to avenge their deaths. Alia is initially possessed by the 3 ghosts who use her to kill their murderer, the family gardener. They then take Abel with them to the netherworld. Mrs. Windu tells Alia that to rescue Abel she has to go to the netherworld with a spirit so that their energies will blend and she will appear as a ghost to them. Only then it is revealed that Davin was really a spirit all along. He had died in a car accident the same day he had started dating Alia. Alia and Davin save Abel after which he goes to heaven.

Even though everything seems alright, a ghost named Mirah keeps following Alia and Abel to wherever they go.

== Cast ==
- Jessica Mila as Alia, Abel's elder sister and Davin's girlfriend
- Denny Sumargo as Davin, Alia's boyfriend
- Citra Prima as Mrs. Windu, Abel's spiritual advisor
- Bianca Hello as Abel, Alia's younger sister
- Epy Kusnandar as Mr. Asep, Alia's housekeeper
- Anita Hara as Alia's mother
- Derry Drajat as Uncle Herman, Alia's father's friend
- Voke Victoria as Teenage Alia
- Shofia Shireen as Young Abel
- Afdhal Yusman as Alia's father
- Asri Handayani as Mrs. Sumarno, ghost at Alia's house
- Agus Julian as Mr. Sumarno, ghost at Alia's house
- Ladislao as foreigner who likes Alia at cafe
- Daniel Leo as Davin's father
- Dea Rizkyana as Tasya, ghost at hospital

== Release ==
It was released on November 30, 2017 in Indonesia cinemas. One year later, it was released on Netflix streaming.
