= Star Wars Rogue Squadron III: Rebel Strike =

2003 video game

- North American cover art
- Developer: Factor 5
- Publisher: LucasArts
- Director: Julian Eggebrecht
- Producer: Brett Tosti
- Artist: Paul Topolos
- Composers: Chris Huelsbeck; Jake Jacobson
- Series: Star Wars: Rogue Squadron
- Platform: GameCube
- Release: NA: October 21, 2003; PAL: November 7, 2003
- Genre: Action
- Modes: Single-player, multiplayer

Star Wars Rogue Squadron III: Rebel Strike is an action video game developed by Factor 5 and published by LucasArts for the GameCube. The game recreates the battles of the original Star Wars trilogy. It follows Rogue Squadron under the command of Luke Skywalker and Wedge Antilles, using starfighters to engage and defeat the Galactic Empire.

Rebel Strike is a sequel to Star Wars: Rogue Squadron (1998) and Star Wars Rogue Squadron II: Rogue Leader (2001). Rebel Strike introduced the ability for players to step out of their starfighters in on-foot missions, and the ability to commandeer ground vehicles of the films, such as the AT-AT, AT-ST, speeder bike, and landspeeder. The two-player mode allows cooperative play for most missions from its predecessor, Rogue Leader.

== Gameplay ==
Star Wars Rogue Squadron III: Rebel Strike features story-based gameplay in ground vehicles and on foot, a first for the series.

The player controls several Star Wars vehicles such as the X-wing and AT-ST across missions that span the movies, plus moments outside the films. It has on-foot missions, and space battle missions from Rogue Squadron series games. Unlockable classic 1980s arcade missions are inspired by the Star Wars original trilogy.

The multiplayer modes are Co-op and Versus. Co-op allows players to replay missions from Rogue Squadron II: Rogue Leader in split-screen, excluding the levels Triumph of the Empire and Revenge on Yavin. Players share the same pool of lives. Versus features a variety of modes, such as Dogfight and Survival. In any Versus mode, players can pilot several craft, including X-wings, A-wings, TIE fighters, and Darth Vader's TIE Advanced. The player can unlock and play Atari's three 1980s Star Wars arcade games: Star Wars (1983), Return of the Jedi (1984), and The Empire Strikes Back (1985).

== Plot ==
=== Luke Skywalker ===
Shortly after the destruction of the Death Star above Yavin 4, the Galactic Empire drives the Rebel Alliance off the moon, leaving them searching for a location to establish a new base. Tycho Celchu, an Imperial officer, defects to the Alliance on Dantooine. He leads the rebels to a group of scientists on Ralltiir, who also wish to defect. During the battle to rescue the scientists, Rogue Squadron member Sarkli defects to the Empire. Despite this, Rogue Squadron and the scientists manage to escape safely in a transport craft. The Rebels establish Echo Base on Hoth, but it is later destroyed by the Empire during the Battle of Hoth, forcing them to flee the Empire again.

=== Wedge Antilles ===
Following the Battle of Hoth, Wedge Antilles leads a raid on Bakura to extract rebel hostages from the orbiting prison. Sarkli leads Rogue Squadron into Geonosis' orbit, where he and Wedge both crash following an ambush by TIE fighters and Imperial escort carriers. Wedge fights with stormtroopers and battle droid remnants. By making use of various pieces of deactivated Galactic Republic machinery left over from the Battle of Geonosis, he escapes and flees the system. This uncovers a ploy to wipe out part of the Alliance fleet over Dubrillion, and, in response, Rogue Squadron raids the shipyards of Fondor to destroy a Super Star Destroyer under construction. Emperor Palpatine reveals that he had personally manipulated the prior battles by throwing them, causing the rebels to become overconfident. The rebels are caught off-guard in the Battle of Endor, which turned out to be an elaborate trap set by the Empire. Despite the emperor's efforts to manipulate the battle to his advantage, Han Solo disables the shield generator protecting the second Death Star over Endor, killing Sarkli and allowing the Rebels to score victory.

== Development ==
The production team's expansion upon the game's predecessor includes adding enhanced atmospheric effects, more impressive explosions, and the capability of having many more enemies on-screen at once than Rogue Leader can handle. Development was troubled because of the decision by director of technology Thomas Engel and development director Holger Schmidt to cancel all the coding of the engine for Rogue Leader so they could "reinvent the wheel" with the knowledge of the GameCube engine they had at that time. Factor 5 ran into software bugs and various difficulties in development of a new landscape engine, causing tedious delays as with Rogue Leader, due to underestimating the schedule.

In the United States and some European countries, players who pre-ordered the game received a bonus disc containing a Rebel Strike demo and the playable Star Wars arcade game, plus trailers for Rebel Strike and Gladius and a concept art gallery. The demo was also released via a special edition bonus disc packaged with Mario Kart: Double Dash (2003) in North America.

== Reception ==
Reception

Aggregate scores
Aggregator	Score
GameRankings	76.61%
Metacritic	75/100

Review scores
Publication	Score
Edge	5/10
Electronic Gaming Monthly	7.17/10
Eurogamer	4/10
Famitsu	30/40
Game Informer	6.5/10
GamePro	4/5
GameRevolution	B−
GameSpot	7.8/10
GameSpy	3/5
GameZone	8.5/10
IGN	8.3/10
Nintendo Life	5/10
Nintendo Power	4.7/5
Nintendo World Report	8/10

Rebel Strike was met with positive reception. On GameRankings it holds a score of 76.61%, and the Metacritic score is 75 out of 100. Critics praised the intense gameplay and the ability to have more enemies on screen than on Rogue Leader. However, Rebel Strike was criticized for its on-foot missions, due to its clunky gameplay and lack of refinement.
