= Rogue Squadron =

Rogue Squadron may refer to:

In video games:

- Star Wars: Rogue Squadron (series), a video game series, consisting of:
  - Star Wars: Rogue Squadron, a 1998 action shooter released for the Nintendo 64 and Microsoft Windows
  - Star Wars Rogue Squadron II: Rogue Leader, a sequel released on the Nintendo GameCube in 2001
  - Star Wars Rogue Squadron III: Rebel Strike, a sequel released on the Nintendo GameCube in 2003

In literature:

- Rogue Squadron, the first novel in the Star Wars: X-wing novel series by Michael A. Stackpole
- Star Wars: X-wing – Rogue Squadron, a series of comic books published by Dark Horse Comics

In film:

- Star Wars: Rogue Squadron (film), an upcoming film directed by Patty Jenkins

Other uses:

- The 75th Expeditionary Airlift Squadron, a U.S. military unit nicknamed "Rogue Squadron"
