= Ian Liston =

English actor, theatrical producer (1948–2016)

- Born: Ian Stuart Liston; 4 August 1948; Crosby, Lancashire, England
- Died: 1 October 2016 (aged 68); Haywards Heath, West Sussex, England
- Occupations: Actor, theatrical producer
- Years active: 1968–2016
- Spouse: Vivien Singleton-Green (m. 1995)

Ian Stuart Liston (4 August 1948 – 1 October 2016) was an English stage, film and television actor and theatrical producer specialising in pantomime, revue and productions for the British touring theatre market. Diagnosed with prostate cancer in 2003, he was also a volunteer 'patient advocate'.

== Early life ==
Born in Crosby, Lancashire, he studied at Walton Grammar School but failed his 'O' levels. Instead, he achieved A levels at technical college before studying Business Studies at Enfield Polytechnic. His work experience was at British Gas.

After being a call boy with a local operatic society, Liston joined the Everyman Theatre in 1964 as an assistant stage manager. By 1970, he became a location manager for Apple Films, working on movies such as Gumshoe, Sitting Target and O Lucky Man!. Liston also worked as a teaboy at Elstree Studios.

== Acting career ==
Entering the industry in 1968, Liston's TV career comprises Softly, Softly: Task Force, Z-Cars, Dixon of Dock Green, The Brothers, Coronation Street, Warship, Barlow at Large, Within These Walls, The Onedin Line, Secret Army, 1990, The Professionals, Doctor Who (Season 16 conclusion The Armageddon Factor), Armchair Thriller, Juliet Bravo, Play for Today, The Bill, Bramwell, Silent Witness and Bugs. However, he is best remembered for playing Ron Brownlow in soap opera Crossroads from 1980–1985.

In film, he appeared as Sergeant Whitney of the Royal Army Medical Corps in Richard Attenborough's A Bridge Too Far but he is best known to Star Wars fans for playing the 'cult' part of Wes Janson (and a number of 'masked' characters including the AT-AT Driver in the same battle sequence, technically shooting himself down) in The Empire Strikes Back. His character features widely in the 'expanded universe' of books and games with Liston consequently attending many conventions as a result.

== Theatre ==
In 1977, Liston set up the Hiss & Boo Company, where he appeared in over 3000 of their Music Hall performances as Mr Chairman. He was the original producer of the stage play Cluedo and the first person to bring the Mr. Men to the stage.

The company ventured into pantomimes in 1995. Some productions the company put on included:

- Aladdin, starring Jeffrey Holland, Robert Duncan and Judy Buxton at the Queen's Theatre, Barnstaple.
- Jack and the Beanstalk, at the Riverfront Theatre (where the cast helped rescue an elderly woman from the River Usk) in 2015.
- Snow White, starring Colin Baker and Fascinating Aïda at the Hall for Cornwall.
- Dick Whittington and His Cat, starring Sylvester McCoy as King Rat at London Zoo in 2005 (their first-ever pantomime).

Aside from Hiss & Boo, Liston produced seven plays in the West End (including An Ideal Husband, Groucho: A Life in Revue, Last of the Red Hot Lovers and Nunsense). For 20 years, he was also an active council member of the Theatrical Management Association. In 2005, he was initiated as the 854th member of the Grand Order of Water Rats.

== Other work ==
Liston also authored several plays for BBC Radio 4.

== Personal life ==
In April 1995, Liston married Vivien, a lawyer. They moved to West Sussex two years later where they spent the rest of their lives together.

== Death ==
In 2003, Liston was diagnosed with prostate cancer (his father, a docker for Cunard, had died of this when he was 72). It spread to his bones and the actor was told he had months to live. Instead of going into a hospice, Liston was referred to Royal Marsden Hospital, taking part in drug trials over the next 12 years based upon revolutionary sampling of his DNA, which made headline news. This in turn led to Liston becoming a stalwart supporter and advocate of prostate cancer research, globe-trotting to events and places such as the Annual Meeting of the American Association for Cancer Research in New Orleans, San Francisco and Detroit, discussing cancer survivorship with other people.

Contrary to reports that the actor had beaten cancer in March 2016, this was not the case. As a result of many years of treatment, his immune system was destroyed, leaving him vulnerable to further illness. This led to Liston catching pneumonia and sepsis, which took his life seven months later. Vivien died that Christmas, a couple of months after her husband.
