= Jedi Prince series =

Series of young-reader novels

- Cover of the first volume
- Author: Paul and Hollis Davids
- Cover artist: Drew Struzan
- Genre: Science Fiction

Jedi Prince is a series of science fiction young-reader novels set in the Star Wars universe, written by Paul and Hollace Davids. They were published by Bantam Skylark between 1992 and 1993. The series takes place about a year after Return of the Jedi, between the events of the books The Truce at Bakura (1993) and Luke Skywalker and the Shadows of Mindor (2008).

== Overview ==
=== The Glove of Darth Vader ===
After the destruction of the second Death Star and the death of the Emperor, the Galactic Empire is left without a true leader. The Supreme Prophet Kadann has prophesied that the next leader of the Empire would wear the indestructible right hand glove of Darth Vader, so Imperial senator Timothy Barclay sends Captain Dunwell to find the glove. The Rebel Alliance and the Senate's Planetary Intelligence Network, hoping to find information on the new emperor, send C-3PO and R2-D2 to the planet Kessel. There they discover Grand Moff Hissa introducing Trioculus, who claims to be Palpatine's son, as the heir to the Empire. Although he manages to trick his followers by seemingly producing Force lightning, he demands that his advisors find the glove so he can cement his power. After much searching and no clues on the glove's whereabouts, Captain Dunwell, the head of the Whaladon Processing Center on Mon Calamari, contacts him to inform him that he has found the glove, deep underneath the ocean. By chance, Luke Skywalker and Admiral Ackbar, after picking up the droids from Kessel, bring them to Mon Calamari to download the information that R2-D2 found. Although the whaling ship is destroyed and Captain Dunwell killed, Luke is unable to stop Trioculus from obtaining the glove and becoming the new emperor. As he parts ways with Luke, Trioculus swears he will destroy him.

=== The Lost City of the Jedi ===
After an attempted assassination by the Empire trying to blow up Luke's X-wing fighter, he has a vision of Obi-Wan Kenobi. Obi-Wan tells Luke of the secret Lost City of the Jedi hidden beneath the rainforests of Yavin 4. Unknown to Luke at the time, the city is home to a 12-year-old boy named Ken, who is called the "Jedi Prince". In the city, with the vast databanks on the computers, Ken learns the history of the Jedi and the Rebellion from his only companions, his caretaker droids. As Luke is searching the forests he meets a mysterious healer, Baji. With Baji, he searches the forests, eventually encountering Ken, who had run away from the droids. Before he is questioned further, his caretaker droid Dee-Jay finds him and helps him vanish in a puff of smoke. Luke, more determined to find this city, returns to get help from the rest of the Rebels.

Meanwhile, Emperor Trioculus has a meeting with Supreme Prophet Kadann. Kadann tells him that he is not the true son of Palpatine, but still gives him the blessing of the Prophets. He also tells him of the Lost City of the Jedi, where the Jedi Prince lives, saying that this prince could end Trioculus' reign. Able to infiltrate the Rebel's meeting with an explosive device, he demands that they reveal to him the location of the city. When they refuse, he readies the device's explosion, while still taking in the beauty of Princess Leia. As Luke stops the explosion, Trioculus starts his second plan: to raze the forests in order to find the entrance. During this implementation, he suddenly goes blind and orders the capture of the healer, Baji. Baji tells him that when he uses the power of Vader's glove, he is injuring his nerve endings, causing blindness and his body to rot. Baji tells him of a cure, but it can only be found in his hut, which is about to be destroyed by the fires. Unable to stop his troops, Trioculus rushes into the hut, and saves the cure, but is badly burned and scarred. As the Rebels attempt to stop the troops, Luke finally finds the city. With the help of the droids at the weather-controlling center, he creates a rainstorm to put an end to the fires. Ken decides to leave with Luke and join the Rebels in their fight leaving the city and his caretakers. Without finding the city, Trioculus leaves the planet, vowing to destroy all of the Rebels except Leia, whom he would make his queen.

=== Zorba the Hutt's Revenge ===
In order to help Ken become accustomed to the world outside of the Lost City of the Jedi, Luke brings him to Tatooine to experience the "Droidfest." Although they are attacked by Tusken Raiders and bounty hunters hoping to get the reward Trioculus set for Ken, they manage to escape to Bespin with Han Solo's housewarming gift, a housekeeping droid named Kate. Meanwhile, Zorba the Hutt, the father of Jabba, upon learning of his son's death, flies to Cloud City in order to claim Jabba's casino. Although the governor, Lando Calrissian, who has taken over the casino, refuses the claim, he agrees to bet the city and the casino on a game of sabacc. With Zorba marking the cards in an ultraviolet paint that only Hutts can see, Lando lost the city and left after warning Han and Leia.

After a series of mishaps, Leia is captured by Trioculus's guards and brought to his factory on the planet and Ken is captured by Zorba. When Zorba learns that his son's murderer is in the custody of Trioculus he proposes a trade. Trioculus, however, won't give up his queen, and although has his stormtroopers ready to aid him, is defeated by Zorba's police force. Ken, however, is able to escape his jailers through a use of a Jedi mind trick and is reunited with Han. Luke is also able to rescue Leia and all are taken aboard the Millennium Falcon before Zorba destroys Trioculus's factory. Thinking that Leia was killed, he taunts Trioculus before freezing him in carbonite. The rebels leave the planet with Han wondering if he'll ever be able to ask Leia to marry him.

=== Mission from Mount Yoda ===
With Trioculus imprisoned in carbonite, the Prophets meet in Kadann's Chamber of Dark Visions to hear his new prophecy on the leadership of the Empire. Kadann spoke in quatrains, prophesying that Trioculus would never again get the blessing to be leader, the new leader is on Duro and finally about the last days of the Rebel Alliance. As the Prophets concoct a plan to retrieve Trioculus's body and destroy it, Luke, Leia and Han fly to Dagobah. The rebels began to colonize Dagobah by building a school, which Ken is to attend, and a fortress that served as the Defense Research and Planetary Assistance Center, DRAPAC. DRAPAC was based on Mount Yoda, and was the subject of Kadann's prophecy. (Note: When the dragon pack, Perched upon Yoda's stony back, Receives a visitor pierced by gold, Then come the last days of the Rebel Alliance.)

While there, a Duros, Dustini, brings news that the planet Duro is under attack by Imperial stormtroopers, who are stealing artifacts. Though he managed to save some, one was a golden crown that was booby trapped and stabbed Dustini, seemingly fulfilling the prophecy. As the Rebels send a mission to Duro to stop the Empire, the Prophets destroy the block of carbonite, only to discover it was fake and Trioculus was still alive. In a secret cavern on Duro, Luke, Han and Ken finally encounter Triclops, the true son of Palpatine. Though the Imperials attacked trying to abduct Triclops, with his help the rebels escaped and brought Triclops back to DRAPAC, with him promising to bring down his father's Empire.

=== Queen of the Empire ===
When a demonstration of a "decoy" Human Replica Droid of Leia goes wrong and the droid shoots a scientist, Han and Leia are forced to fly him to his home planet of Chad to get treatment. When they reach the planet's hospital a hurricane is ravaging it. After Han is able to bring the scientist to the doctors, he is trapped by falling rubble caused by the storm. When Leia eventually saves him, he reveals that the experience scared him that he would not be able to reveal his big plans. Upon leaving the scientist in the doctors' care, Han proposes to Leia and they plan on eloping at Hologram Fun World, an amusement park. With the help of the new owner of the park, Lando Calrissian, they plan a wedding and visit many hologram attractions, including a trip through the Alderaan of Leia's memories.

While they are at the park, one of Zorba the Hutt's spies in the park tells him that Leia is alive and he plans on capturing her and killing her on Tatooine as she did to his son. With some help, he manages to capture her during a magic show and take her to his ship, with the carbonite-frozen body of Trioculus, for the trip to Tatooine. Zorba's ship, however, is captured by the Moffship of Grand Moff Hissa. When they discover Trioculus is still alive, he is quickly unfrozen and only spares Zorba's life when Zorba reveals where Leia is. Hoping to turn Leia to his side, Trioculus drops Zorba into the Pit of Carkoon into the mouth of the Sarlacc. While Trioculus makes plans to marry Leia, Han and Lando, joined by Luke, Ken and the Human Replica Droid of Leia are able to infiltrate the Moffship and plan a rescue operation. They rescue Leia and are able to replace her with the Human Replica Droid, who goes to the wedding in Leia's place. While the Millennium Falcon escapes, the droid's lasers pierce Trioculus's heart. As he lay dying, unbeknownst to anyone, Zorba crawled out of the Sarlacc, as no creature in the universe can digest a Hutt.

=== Prophets of the Dark Side ===
As Trioculus lay dying he made Grand Moff Hissa promise that he would make Luke Skywalker and the rest of the Rebels pay for killing him. Meanwhile, at the Rebel base, they realize that Triclops, while sleepwalking, goes through files at the base and transmits them, through an implant on his tooth, to Imperial probe droids which are evading defenses. Leia proposes that a defense probe be built from plans found at the Lost City of the Jedi. These plans happen to be from Ken's homework assignments, prompting him and Luke to return to the city. While there, Ken's caretaker Dee-Jay and the other droids tell them about a decoy transport to the city that now leads to an underground sea of lava and also warn them of a prophecy by Supreme Prophet Kadann. (Note: When the Jedi Knight Becomes a captive of Scardia Then shall the Jedi Prince Betray the Lost City.)

While they return to the Rebel base on Yavin, Zorba the Hutt has a meeting with the Prophets of the Dark Side in their space station Scardia. He tells of the grand moffs betrayals and plans of making Trioculus leader once again. When the Moffship is captured, they are put to trial, and surprised to see Zorba as the main witness. All of the moffs are sentenced to certain death, with Hissa's being the cruelest, as the loyalest supporter of Trioculus.

Back on Yavin 4, Luke decides to give Triclops false information about the decoy transporter. In order to stop the information leak altogether, Luke, Ken, and Chewbacca went to the planet Arzid to find a mushroom to deactivate the implant. While there they are captured by Imperial stormtroopers and brought to the Prophets. Kadann, using the false information from Triclops, sends Hissa to his death in the decoy transport and threatens that he will send Luke if Ken doesn't betray the location of the real transport. He also promises Ken that he will reveal who his father was. With that motivation, Ken betrays the city and is brought with the Prophets to it. There Kadann reveals that Ken's father is Triclops, meaning that the Emperor was his grandfather. Not wanting to believe them and crying, Ken is told that he will be bred to be the new Emperor and will know the dark side of the Force. Meanwhile, Luke, finally able to get free of his guards and rescued by Han and the others, is able to sneak into the city through a steam vent. He rescues Ken, but not before the city is shut down by the Imperials and an earthquake destroys the main computer. Although Luke and Ken are able to reach the surface, Kadann and the other prophets are trapped in the city. Ken is able to come to terms with his parentage, but is unable to speak to his father about it, as Triclops manages to escape and evade capture in the forests of Yavin. The story ends with Leia, preparing for her wedding and seeing a vision of Han with their two children, wondering if they are twins.

== Characters ==
- Ken, the main protagonist, is a brave but callow youth, whose behavior resembles that of Luke Skywalker before his Jedi training. Raised in the Lost City of the Jedi for the first twelve years of his life, Ken eventually joins the Rebel Alliance, where Luke discovers him. Ken is the son of the mutant Triclops and, therefore, Emperor Palpatine's grandson.
- Trioculus is the self-proclaimed son and heir of Palpatine. As his moniker implies, he has three eyes: two in the same place as a normal human and a third on his forehead. He attempts to procure the glove worn on the hand that Darth Vader lost in his duel with Luke Skywalker in Return of the Jedi. This glove is rumored to bestow great power upon its holder. Trioculus is killed by a droid replica of Princess Leia.
- Triclops is Palpatine's illegitimate son, named because of his three eyes. He is sent into solitary exile because the Emperor fears Triclops' potential mastery of the dark side of the Force. During his exile, The Empire administers shock treatment therapies which eventually drove the boy insane, and he is sent to an insane asylum. There, he meets the nurse Kendalina, a Jedi Princess, and the two conceive a child. Kendalina is murdered, and their son, Ken, is taken away. Triclops is forced to work for the slave lord Trioculus. After pledging pacifism and his desire to see the Empire's demise, Triclops is taken in by the Alliance. When they learn he was fitted with an implant that transmits images to Imperial Probe droids, they feed him disinformation. Triclops escapes before they can destroy the implant, leaving only an impassioned letter to his son, Ken.
- Grand Moff Hissa is an Imperial Moff who plots to take over the reins of the empire by using Trioculus as a puppet dictator. He loses his legs during a scuffle with the Rebellion, in which he falls into a vat of acid; thereafter, he uses a hovering wheelchair to get around.
- Supreme Prophet of the Dark Side Kadann is a bearded dwarf who prophesies that the next Emperor would wear the glove of Darth Vader, hence Trioculus's interest in it. Part of Kadann's success as a prophet is due to a network of bribe-payers and other people who help his prophecies come true. In the Dark Side Sourcebook, it is revealed that this Kadann was once a Jedi who was secretly turned to the dark side before the Great Jedi Purge. He pledged his loyalty to Palpatine, and was thus spared and became one of his chief advisors. Kadann foresees the Emperor's death at Endor and tries to warn him; this warning went disregarded, of course.

== Reception ==
GameRant said the "books are rife with bizarre plot threads" and "the series comes off as a teenaged Dungeons & Dragons player writing a Star Wars fan fiction." Gizmodo called the series "bad" and listed it among the 12 worst things in the Expanded Universe.

== ISBN information ==
- The Glove of Darth Vader, 1st edition paperback, 1992. Paul Davids and Hollace Davids, ISBN 0-553-15887-2
- The Lost City of the Jedi, 1st edition paperback, 1992. Paul Davids and Hollace Davids, ISBN 0-553-15888-0
- Zorba the Hutt's Revenge, 1st edition paperback, 1992. Paul Davids and Hollace Davids, ISBN 0-553-15889-9
- Mission from Mount Yoda, 1st edition paperback, 1993. Paul Davids and Hollace Davids, ISBN 0-553-15890-2
- Queen of the Empire, 1st edition paperback, 1993. Paul Davids and Hollace Davids, ISBN 0-553-15891-0
- Prophets of the Dark Side, 1st edition paperback, 1993. Paul Davids and Hollace Davids, ISBN 0-553-15892-9
