= Wedge Antilles =

Character in Star Wars

- Star Wars character
- Denis Lawson as Wedge Antilles in Star Wars: Episode IV – A New Hope (1977)
- First appearance: Star Wars (1977)
- Created by: George Lucas
- Portrayed by: Denis Lawson
- Voiced by: David Ankrum (Episode IV and Rogue One); Denis Lawson (Rogue Squadron II, Squadrons, and Visions); Nathan Kress (Lego Star Wars: The Force Awakens and Rebels); Other: Meshach Taylor (Star Wars radio drama); Don Scardino (The Empire Strikes Back radio drama); Jon Matthews (Return of the Jedi radio drama); Chris Cox (Star Wars Jedi Knight: Jedi Academy and Rogue Squadron III); Matthew Mercer (Disney Infinity 3.0); Michael Daingerfield (The Yoda Chronicles and The Freemaker Adventures)

In-universe information
- Gender: Male
- Titles: TIE SS25 (Imperial cadet); Red Two (Battle of Yavin); Rogue Three (Rogue Squadron); Red Leader (Battle of Endor)
- Occupation: Marshal of the Alliance Starfighter Corps; Red Squadron X-wing pilot; Phantom Squadron commander; Flight instructor; Legends: Rogue Squadron commander; Wraith Squadron commander; New Republic general; Supreme Commander of Corellia's armed forces
- Affiliation: Rebel Alliance; Rogue Squadron; New Republic; Resistance; Legends: Galactic Alliance; Confederation; Jedi Coalition
- Family: Karé Kun (stepdaughter-in-law); Legends: Jagged Antilles (father, deceased); Zena Antilles (mother, deceased); Syal Antilles Fel (sister); Soontir Fel (brother-in-law); Davin Fel (nephew, deceased); Chak Fel (nephew, deceased); Cherith Fel (niece, deceased); Jagged Fel (nephew); Wynssa Fel (niece); Cem Fel (nephew); Jaina Solo Fel (niece-in-law)
- Spouses: Norra Wexley; Legends: Iella Wessiri
- Children: Temmin "Snap" Wexley (stepson); Legends: Syal Antilles (daughter); Myri Antilles (daughter)
- Homeworld: Corellia

Wedge Antilles is a fictional character in the Star Wars franchise. He is a supporting character portrayed by Denis Lawson in the original Star Wars trilogy, and voiced by David Ankrum in Episode IV – A New Hope (1977) and Rogue One (2016). He is also featured in the Star Wars expanded universe, most notably as the lead character in most of the X-Wing novels. Antilles has also appeared in the sequel trilogy film The Rise of Skywalker (2019), with Lawson reprising his role; in the 2014 animated series Star Wars Rebels, voiced by Nathan Kress; and in the 2023 second volume of Star Wars: Visions, voiced again by Lawson.

Before defecting to the Rebel Alliance, Antilles was an Imperial cadet (callsign: TIE SS25) of the Skystrike Academy. Antilles founded Rogue Squadron with his friend Luke Skywalker. His superior piloting skills, in-depth knowledge of Imperial military doctrine, and tactical leadership quickly propelled him through the ranks to become Marshal of the Alliance Starfighter Corps. Antilles is notable for having participated in more starfighter battles ending with decisive Alliance victories than any other character: he led the allied assault during the Battle of Exegol and Jakku; supported Project Starhawk; piloted a snowspeeder in the defense of Echo Base on Hoth; and is the only Rebel starfighter pilot to have survived both attack runs on the Death Stars at the battles of Yavin and Endor.

== Depiction ==
Colin Higgins in 2007.

Wedge Antilles was first seen in the 1977 film A New Hope in the Rebels' Death Star attack briefing. In this scene he was portrayed by Colin Higgins and voiced by David Ankrum, who dubbed the character throughout the film. For the remaining scenes filmed in the X-wing cockpit, the character was played by Denis Lawson. Higgins was originally cast in the role of Antilles but reportedly had difficulty remembering his lines, and was consequently replaced by Lawson for subsequent scenes, but Higgins's scene remained in the final cut of the film. The discrepancy became a popular subject in Star Wars fandom, and Higgins acquired the nickname "Fake Wedge".

Lawson reprised the role of Antilles in The Empire Strikes Back, Return of the Jedi and The Rise of Skywalker. Lawson used his own voice in these films, masking his natural Scottish accent with an imitation of an American accent. Ankrum was also the voice of Antilles in Rogue One. Coincidentally, Denis Lawson is the maternal uncle of Ewan McGregor, who made his first appearance in the role of Obi-Wan Kenobi in the Star Wars prequel trilogy.

== Appearances ==
=== Films ===
Wedge Antilles appears towards the end of Star Wars as "Red Two", an X-wing pilot and a member of Red Squadron. His considerable dogfighting prowess is shown during the Battle of Yavin when he saves Luke Skywalker from being shot down by a TIE fighter pilot that he could not shake off, picking off the hostile with a point blank, high deflection angle shot. Along with Skywalker and Biggs Darklighter, Antilles is one of only three X-wing pilots to survive until the final attack runs along the Death Star's trench. However, his X-wing is damaged, and he is forced to disengage before the Death Star is destroyed. He and Luke are the only two X-wing pilots to survive the battle, along with a Y-wing and the Millennium Falcon.

Antilles appears in The Empire Strikes Back as a member of the newly formed Rogue Squadron. He flies a snowspeeder under the callsign "Rogue Three" against the Empire's AT-AT ground assault with Wes Janson as his harpoon gunner. Their snowspeeder inflicts the first casualty against the AT-AT attack group by firing a harpoon trailing a tow cable into one of the walker's legs and circling the walker several times, causing it to trip and fall and allowing Rebel forces to destroy the walker. After the battle, Antilles is seen and heard wishing Luke a safe trip.

Antilles appears towards the end of Return of the Jedi as the leader of Red Squadron in the Battle of Endor. Along with Lando Calrissian, who pilots the Millennium Falcon with Nien Nunb, he leads the fighter attack on the second Death Star. His dogfighting prowess is shown again in this battle, as Antilles personally shoots down a number of Imperial TIE fighters, and appears to easily navigate the narrow and treacherous flight spaces inside the Death Star that lead to its core. When he and Calrissian reach the Death Star's core, Antilles destroys the power regulator on the core's north tower, while Calrissian destroys the core itself. He later appears at the victory celebration at the Ewok village on Endor, apparently the only surviving member of his fleet.

Antilles appears, once again played by Denis Lawson, in the final installment of the Star Wars sequel trilogy, The Rise of Skywalker. He is seen manning a gun turret on the Millennium Falcon during the battle between the Resistance and the Sith Eternal, shortly after the death of his stepson Snap. Lawson had previously been asked to appear as Wedge Antilles in The Force Awakens, in the narrative role the character Poe Dameron was ultimately created for, but declined due to scheduling conflicts.

Antilles is not seen on screen in the spinoff film Rogue One, but his voice is briefly heard over the intercom in the Rebel base on Yavin 4. He was intentionally omitted from the film's climactic battle in order to avoid a continuity error with the first Star Wars film, which takes place immediately after Rogue One. In that film, he utters the phrase "Look at the size of that thing!" which would have made less sense if he had already seen the Death Star at Scarif.

=== Television ===
In the television series Star Wars Rebels, Wedge Antilles is voiced by Nathan Kress. He first appeared in the episode The Antilles Extraction, the fourth episode of the third season. The episode establishes Antilles's canon backstory as an Imperial TIE fighter pilot who with the help of Sabine Wren defected from the Empire, and joined the Rebel Alliance. Antilles later appeared in the episode "Double Agent Droid," the nineteenth episode of the third season, and again in both parts of the third-season finale Zero Hour, the twenty-first and twenty-second episodes, respectively. Antilles' last appearance in Rebels was in the first part of "In the Name of the Rebellion", the third episode of the fourth season.

=== Novels ===
Wedge Antilles is featured in the Star Wars: Aftermath trilogy by Chuck Wendig, consisting of the novels Aftermath (2015), Life Debt (2016), and Empire's End (2017). In this series, Antilles establishes a new unit called Phantom Squadron, which sees action on the planets Kashyyyk and Jakku. Following the Battle of Jakku, which ends the Galactic Civil War, Antilles relocates to Hosnian Prime, where he serves as a flight instructor.

Antilles makes a brief appearance in Claudia Gray's 2015 novel Star Wars: Lost Stars, in which he recruits Thane Kyrell, one of the novel's protagonists, into the Rebel Alliance.

Antilles later moves to the planet Akiva where he retires with Norra Wexley. The two appear in the 2019 novel Star Wars: Resistance Reborn where they join a Resistance mission to save some political prisoners on Corellia. He is the stepfather of Resistance fighter pilot Snap Wexley, played in the sequel trilogy by Greg Grunberg.

=== Legends ===
In April 2014, most of the licensed Star Wars novels and comics produced since the originating 1977 film Star Wars were rebranded by Lucasfilm as Star Wars Legends and declared non-canon to the franchise.

Wedge Antilles appears in the 1983 Marvel Star Wars comic "Hoth Stuff!", in which it is revealed that he went missing during the Battle of Hoth. Aboard his ship, Luke and Leia listen to his log tape recounting how he survived the Imperial invasion by hiding with Janson in the AT-AT Luke took down. They were later prevented from contacting the Rebellion by orbiting TIE fighters and had to face wampas and other dangers. Janson was eventually killed by scavengers; Antilles then stole one of their ships to escape the planet and contact the Rebellion. He suddenly appears outside one of the windows, after working on the ship from space. Leia also states that he and Luke grew up together on Tatooine, which Antilles seems to confirm in his log by mentioning a girlfriend he had there.

Star Wars Legends literature explains that Antilles's parents were killed when their starship-refueling depot exploded. He piloted a freighter before joining the Rebel Alliance as a starfighter pilot.

Antilles is the lead character in most of the Star Wars: X-Wing novels by Michael A. Stackpole and Aaron Allston, set in the Star Wars expanded universe. Several Dark Horse Comics series focus on Antilles and Rogue Squadron, and the character also appears in other expanded universe works including The New Jedi Order and Legacy of the Force novels. Antilles is one of two main player characters in the Rogue Squadron video game series (Luke Skywalker is the other), and Antilles appears as a minor character in Star Wars Jedi Knight: Jedi Academy, helping the player during one mission. He is also a playable character in Lego Star Wars III: The Clone Wars.

== In popular culture ==
- IGN named Antilles the 24th greatest Star Wars character of all time, claiming "Wedge Antilles may be the most important ancillary character in the Star Wars universe".
- Antilles was portrayed by three voice actors in the Star Wars radio series from National Public Radio: Meshach Taylor in A New Hope, Don Scardino in The Empire Strikes Back, and Jon Matthews in Return of the Jedi.
