= Krayt =

There are three usages for the word Krayt in the Star Wars universe:

- Darth Krayt, ruler of the Legacy-era Sith at 140 A.B.Y.
- Krayt pearl, a powerful lightsaber focusing crystal
- Krayt dragon, a massive behemoth that is indigenous to Tatooine
