= Darksaber =

"Darksaber" may refer to:

- The Darksaber (fictional weapon), a unique fictional weapon in the Star Wars franchise
- Darksaber (novel), a 1995 Star Wars novel by Kevin J. Anderson
