= Callista trilogy =

Star Wars novel trilogy

- The cover of Children of the Jedi
- Author: Barbara Hambly; Kevin J. Anderson
- Cover artist: Drew Struzan
- Language: English
- Subject: Star Wars
- Genre: Science fiction
- Publisher: Bantam Spectra
- Publication place: United States
- Media type: Hardcover & Paperback

The Callista trilogy is a series of three American science fiction novels, set in the Star Wars universe and featuring the ex-Jedi character Callista Ming; while not officially branded as a trilogy, they are often regarded as such. They take place beginning several months after the Jedi Academy trilogy, or eight years after Return of the Jedi. The first book, Children of the Jedi (1995), was written by American writer Barbara Hambly. The second book is Darksaber (1995) by Kevin J. Anderson. Hambly also wrote the final novel in the cycle, Planet of Twilight (1997). After the 2012 acquisition of Lucasfilm by Disney, the books were rebranded as Star Wars Legends.

== Summary ==
=== Children of the Jedi ===
Han Solo and Princess Leia learn of the now-abandoned Jedi stronghold on the planet of Belsavis from Drub McKumb and travel there, only to discover a political conspiracy involving a Force-adept, members of the Ancient Houses and the Emperor's Hand who is able to change the programming of droids and mechanicals. Meanwhile, Luke Skywalker, C-3PO, two Jedi students (Nichos and Cray), and a myriad selection of alien life-forms along with a former stormtrooper are abducted aboard the sinister Eye of Palpatine, impossibly reactivated after thirty years. Fighting the effects of massive indoctrination, injury, and cold manipulation by the ship's artificial intelligence and its horrific security measures, Luke discovers the Eye is bound for the destruction of Belsavis. Racing against time and exhaustion he struggles to rescue his companions; who are being held hostage as the Will has decided they are Rebel Saboteurs, find a way to transport all the ship's prisoners back to their home worlds, and find a way to destroy the super-weapon. He makes an unexpected ally in the form of Callista Ming, the brave Jedi who sacrificed her life to stop the ship thirty years before, and now exists as a fading spirit in the gunnery computers. Tenderness grows between them, but time is running out, and the destruction of the Eye will mean the final loss of Callista forever.

Beyond all hope, Callista is revived as a human when Cray chooses to die and be reunited with her dead lover Nichos and offers her body to the former Jedi. But everything has to be paid for, Callista loses her Jedi powers. Their love and trials continue in Darksaber and The Planet of Twilight.

=== Darksaber ===
While searching Jabba the Hutt's palace on Tatooine, Luke Skywalker and Han Solo learn that the Hutts are planning to build another superweapon. Meanwhile, in the Hoth Asteroid Belt, Durga the Hutt is planning a diplomatic mission to Coruscant, where he will secretly obtain the plans for the Death Star super laser for Bevel Lemelisk, the Death Star's designer. Skywalker and Solo reveal their discoveries, but not before Durga's subordinates steal the plans from the Imperial Palace. In order to find out the location of the superweapon, the New Republic launches a covert operation to Nal Hutta, disguised as a diplomatic summit. Back at the Hoth asteroid belt, Lemelisk starts construction on the cylindrical superlaser, which he calls the "Darksaber" for its shape is similar to the hilt of a lightsaber.

Luke and Callista embark on a journey to help Callista regain her Force powers. They discover that Callista can only tap into the Dark Side of the Force after they were attacked by some strange flying creatures on Dagobah. Their journey continues to the Hoth system where they encounter a group of stranded refugees. The group is attacked by a pack of wampas, led by the same wampa Luke dismembered several years ago. The refugees are killed in the attack, Luke and Callista try to escape only to find their ship wrecked. They lift off, but have little power and become stranded in the asteroid belt surrounding Hoth.

They are rescued by Han and Leia, who just returned from the successful mission on Nal Hutta. However, Luke and Callista's rescue is mainly thanks to the Republic fleet, who arrived to launch Crix Madine and his squad to locate the Darksaber reported to be under construction in the region. While Madine succeeds in relaying the location to the fleet, he is captured and killed by Durga. However, Durga's triumph is short-lived when the Republic fleet spots the Darksaber and begins pursuit. The Darksaber attempts to fire its superlaser and make an escape, but the weapon fails and the ship is destroyed by two large asteroids.

Meanwhile, Admiral Daala succeeds in uniting the remains of the Empire in the core systems. With the help of Pellaeon, she plans a strike force against a series of New Republic targets, including the Jedi Academy on Yavin 4. They also attack Khomm, where Jedi trainees Kyp Durron and Dorsk 81 are visiting. Furious, the pair of Jedi spy on Daala's fleet and succeed in warning the academy of the attack. Using the powers of the Force, the Jedi trainees back at Yavin 4 manage to hold off Daala's forces until New Republic reinforcements arrive. Daala is forced to retreat when her Super Star Destroyer, the Knight Hammer, is destroyed. After the failed attack, Daala transfers control over the Imperial forces to Pellaeon. Meanwhile, Callista decides to temporarily leave Luke and venture on a journey to regain her powers. Luke is heartbroken but decides to move on and continue to build the Jedi Academy.

=== Planet of Twilight ===
The story takes place about a year after the previous book on Nam Chorios, a backwater world in the Outer Rim which was the center of the Death Seed Plague centuries ago. It is now home to a fanatic religious cult which is plotting to use a new weapon system of quasi-intelligent crystals as unstoppable, unmanned starfighters to attack the New Republic. Leia unofficially goes on a trip to meet with Seti Ashgad, the leader of the Rationalist Party.

Luke Skywalker is there after receiving a message from Callista. Luke's ship is shot down and Leia is kidnapped by the ancient and corrupt Beldorion the Hutt.

After a series of adventures the two escape and end the political conspiracy between the Rationalists and the New Republic.

== Reception ==
As with all of Bantam Spectra's Star Wars releases from the mid-1990s, Children of the Jedi is a bestseller. Although Darksaber was not as successful as the Jedi Academy trilogy, it peaked at number three on the New York Times Best Seller list.

== See also ==
- Irek Ismaren
