= Paul Davids =

American novelist

Paul Davids is an American independent filmmaker and writer, especially in the area of science fiction. Often collaborating with his wife Hollace, Davids has written and directed several films. He has also written episodes for the television series Transformers as well as a spin-off of the Star Wars series with his wife informally known as the Jedi Prince series.

== Screenwriting ==
=== Television ===
- The Transformers (1985–1986)
- Defenders of the Earth (1986)
- Bionic Six (1987)
- Spiral Zone (1987)
- Garbage Pail Kids (1988)
- COPS (1988)
- Transformers: Generation 2 (1993)

=== Films ===
- Roswell (1994), a documentary about the Roswell UFO incident
- Timothy Leary's Dead (1997)
- Starry Night (1999), a film about Van Gogh
- The Sci-Fi Boys (2006) documentary called featuring interviews with Forry Ackerman, Ray Bradbury, Ray Harryhausen, and many more sci-fi notables.
- Jesus in India The Movie (2008) – a documentary on "American adventurer" Edward T. Martin's quest for the supposed unknown years of Jesus and Russian Nicolas Notovitch's claimed lost Life of Issa.
