= Hoth =

Fictional planet in Star Wars

- Star Wars location
- Hoth and its three natural satellites in The Empire Strikes Back
- First appearance: The Empire Strikes Back
- Created by: George Lucas
- Genre: Science fiction

In-universe information
- Type: Ice planet
- Races: Tauntauns; Wampas
- Location: Hoth system
- Oceans: 0
- Affiliation: Rebel Alliance
- Moons: 3
- Battles: Battle of Hoth
- Grid Coordinates: K-18

Hoth is an ice planet in the Star Wars fictional universe. It first appeared in the 1980 film The Empire Strikes Back and has also been a setting in Star Wars books and video games.

== Description ==
Hoth is the sixth planet of a remote system of the same name. It is a small, terrestrial planet with three orbiting moons and blanketed entirely by snow and ice. The freezing climate, although habitable, is mostly too cold for intelligent life to develop. Hoth is home to only a few species, including the towering, predatory wampa, which is the most intelligent creature on the planet, and the gray snow-lizards known as tauntauns. Both appear in The Empire Strikes Back.

Battle of Hoth
- Part of the Galactic Civil War
Date	3 ABY
Location	Hoth system
Result	Galactic Empire victory: Destruction of Echo Base

Belligerents
Rebel Alliance	Galactic Empire; Sith

Commanders and leaders
Luke Skywalker; Leia Organa; Wedge Antilles; Han Solo; Chewbacca; C-3PO	Darth Vader; Admiral Piett

== Appearances ==
=== Film ===
In the 1980 film The Empire Strikes Back, Hoth is the home of the Rebel Alliance's secret Echo Base, which is partially installed in natural caves formed by giant ice bubbles. The Rebels patrol the planet by riding indigenous tauntauns. At the start of the film, Luke Skywalker and his tauntaun are attacked by a wampa. Skywalker eventually escapes and is rescued by Han Solo. When one of the Galactic Empire's probe droids uncovers the base, the Rebels are forced to evacuate. The Empire arrives and deploys ground forces to destroy the base, but the Rebels battle the AT-ATs with ground artillery and snowspeeders to stall them and effectively evacuate. This conflict is known as the Battle of Hoth.

The original draft of The Empire Strikes Back, written by Leigh Brackett, depicted an opening scene with Luke Skywalker on the ridge of an ice planet, though the name "Hoth" was given to the cloud planet at the time (later called Bespin). The draft also depicted Hoth's wampas attacking the Rebel base.

The Hardangerjøkulen glacier near Finse, Norway, served as the filming location for Hoth in The Empire Strikes Back. Scenes were filmed in subzero temperatures. For the ground battle scene, miniatures were used on a set that used microscopic glass bubbles and baking soda to mimic the snowy territory.

=== Legends ===
Hoth has also appeared in Star Wars comics, books, and video games. In the 1983 Marvel Star Wars comic "Hoth Stuff!", it is revealed that Wedge Antilles went missing during the Battle of Hoth. In the novel Darksaber (1995), Luke Skywalker and his lover Callista Ming travel to Hoth, where they encounter the same wampa that attacked Luke in Empire, but he swiftly kills it. In Shadows of the Empire, Hoth is one of several settings for Dash Rendar's adventures, including the Battle of Hoth.

=== Tabletop game ===
In Unlock! Star Wars, Escape from Hoth appears as one of the three scenarios.

=== Video games ===
The planet appears in the Star Wars: Battlefront series (2004–) as multiplayer maps, and in the Lego-themed games Lego Star Wars II: The Original Trilogy (2006) and Lego Star Wars: The Complete Saga (2007) during the first two-story levels of Episode V. It also appears as an explorable hub world in the 2022 game Lego Star Wars: The Skywalker Saga.

The planet also appears in Star Wars Jedi Knight: Jedi Academy.

== Scientific accuracy ==
The planetary attributes of the fictional planet Hoth have been scrutinized for scientific accuracy. Space.com said Hoth most resembled the extrasolar planet OGLE-2005-BLG-390Lb, "With a surface temperature of −364 degrees Fahrenheit (−220 degrees Celsius), it is nearly as frigid as Pluto." Bruce Betts of The Planetary Society said the asteroid belt near Hoth meant that the planet would have difficulty staying in place. With Hoth being bombarded frequently by asteroids, Betts said it would be unlikely for natural lifeforms (like the wampa and the tauntaun shown in the film) to evolve on the planet.

Jeanne Cavelos theorized in The Science of Star Wars that the frequency of meteoroids bombarding Hoth indicated that the planet was relatively young since in older solar systems, the debris is more cleared out. Since Hoth has complex lifeforms, Cavolos said the planet's age may be older, in the range of several billion years. The author said Hoth could be similar to Earth in age but lack neighboring planets like Jupiter and Saturn to shelter it from meteoroid impacts. She also said with the asteroid belt depicted in the film as close to Hoth that the belt was a likely source for meteoroids. (The asteroid belt itself is unrealistically depicted as being closely clustered, which would normally mean that the asteroids would be reduced to sand-sized rubble over a long enough timespan.)

CJ Miozzi, writing for The Escapist, said that Hoth was realistic as a single-biome planet (among numerous such planets in Star Wars), citing Jupiter's moon Europa as a similar example. Miozzi said the planet was depicted in the Star Wars books as being geologically active and having additional smaller lifeforms, including lichen. The author said lichen on Earth was an important part of the food chain during winter months but that it could grow back outside these months. With Hoth perpetually iced over, Miozzi said lichen likely would not be sufficient to support a multi-tiered food chain that includes an apex predator, the wampa.

== Theme park attraction ==
Hoth appears in the theme park attraction Star Tours - The Adventures Continue in Disney's Hollywood Studios in Walt Disney World Resort in Orlando, Florida and Disneyland Park in Disneyland Resort in Anaheim, California.

== See also ==
- List of Star Wars planets and moons
- Snowball Earth
