= Star Wars: Rogue Squadron (series) =

Video game series

- Genres: Action, shooter
- Developers: Factor 5 LucasArts
- Publishers: LucasArts; Nintendo
- Platforms: Nintendo 64, Windows, GameCube
- Parent series: Star Wars video games
- Spin-offs: Squadrons

Star Wars: Rogue Squadron is a series of Star Wars action video games jointly developed by LucasArts and Factor 5 and published by LucasArts for Nintendo consoles. Aspyr has expressed interest in bringing the series to the Nintendo Switch.

The series deals with the Rebel Alliance unit, Rogue Squadron, who under the command of Luke Skywalker and Wedge Antilles use starfighters to engage and defeat the Galactic Empire. The games are set during episodes A New Hope, The Empire Strikes Back, and Return of the Jedi and recreate the battles that take place during those films, notably the Battle of Hoth, which is in every Rogue Squadron game in one form or another. Both of the GameCube Rogue Squadron games feature "making-of" documentaries.

== Rogue Squadron ==
Star Wars: Rogue Squadron was released for the Nintendo 64 video game console and the PC on December 7, 1998. It was one of the first Nintendo 64 games to support the console's Expansion Pak, which allowed higher-quality graphics to be displayed while playing.

The story is set between A New Hope and The Empire Strikes Back (with the exception of the final level and secret levels) and shows the missions set during the formation of Rogue Squadron.

Several unlockable vehicles appear in Star Wars: Rogue Squadron. By inputting certain text-based cheat codes, the player could unlock the Millennium Falcon, a TIE interceptor, an AT-ST, a 1969 Buick Electra, and a Naboo N-1 Starfighter from Star Wars: Episode I – The Phantom Menace. LucasArts, anticipating the film's release in 1999, programmed in the unlockable extra and released the code in conjunction with the movie. During the five months between the game's release and that of The Phantom Menace, players discovered many of the secret vehicles, but the Naboo Starfighter remained unknown due to its unusual method of unlocking. The former two vehicles became playable when a password was entered and R2-D2's beeps affirmed it, but the Naboo Starfighter required two consecutive codes, and R2-D2's sounds did not play after the first code.

In 1999, Star Wars: Rogue Squadron won the Origins Award for Best Action Computer Game of 1998.

== Rogue Squadron II: Rogue Leader ==
Rogue Squadron II: Rogue Leader was released as launch game in 2001 for the GameCube. Developed by Factor 5 and published by LucasArts, Rogue Leader expanded on the original game with improved graphics and a new tactics menu that allows the player to form up their squadron or set a target for their squadron such as laser turrets or enemy TIE fighters. The game also expanded on the unlockable levels of the original—Beggars Canyon is included in the tutorial, the opening level Battle of Yavin was included in both games, and Battle of Hoth was made more authentic.

Rogue Leader features short clips from the movie trilogy, during the menu screens and cut-scenes.

== Rogue Squadron III: Rebel Strike ==
Rogue Squadron III: Rebel Strike was released in 2003 for the GameCube, and was developed by Factor 5 and published by LucasArts. It added to the game the ability for the player to depart their starfighter and join in on a land battle as well as enter into land vehicles such as an Imperial AT-AT and AT-ST during certain missions. The mission selection screen broke away from the linear format of the two previous titles and featured two intertwined storylines following the adventures of Luke Skywalker and Wedge Antilles.

Rebel Strike was the first in the Rogue Squadron series to include a multiplayer mode. The game featured two-player competitive dogfights, races, and land assaults as well as a co-operative campaign including all but two of the missions from Rogue Squadron II: Rogue Leader.

== Episode I: Battle for Naboo ==
Star Wars Episode I: Battle for Naboo was released on December 18, 2000, for the Nintendo 64 and on March 12, 2001, for PC, and was developed by Factor 5. "Battle for Naboo" is a spiritual successor to the original game in its design, with added land and water combat. It very loosely follows the plot of Episode I: The Phantom Menace, but focuses on minor film character Gavyn Sykes, a Nabooian security lieutenant, as he fights the Trade Federation.

== Cancelled sequels ==
After Rogue Squadron III, Factor 5 worked on releasing a Rogue Squadron trilogy with higher graphics and gameplay improvements for the Xbox console. It was cancelled when management at LucasArts changed in 2003, even though the game was 50% complete.

Factor 5 shifted to making an Xbox 360 launch title, Rogue Squadron: X-Wing vs Tie Fighter. It was designed to be the first multiplayer-focused title in the series, but LucasArts canceled the game before completion due to uncertainties in the console market. Sony approached Factor 5 to create a launch title for the upcoming PS3, but Sony declined on the Rogue Squadron series. The game engine and assets were then adapted into the PlayStation 3 game Lair.

After Factor 5's exclusivity period with Sony ended, the company shifted its focus to releasing a Rogue Squadron trilogy compilation for the Nintendo Wii, titled Star Wars Rogue Squadron: Rogue Leaders. It was based on Factor 5's original work on the Xbox, but was further enhanced to include various motion control options and motion-based lightsaber dueling. While it was completed, it remains unreleased due to the 2008 financial crisis, which caused their publishers to back out of the project. LucasArts later absorbed the rights of the title during the Factor 5 bankruptcy liquidation.

== See also ==
- Star Wars: Squadrons – 2020 video game
