= List of Star Wars Legends characters =

This is an incomplete list of characters from the Star Wars Expanded Universe, now rebranded Star Wars Legends. The accompanying works were declared non-canon to the Star Wars franchise by Lucasfilm in 2014.

This list applies only to characters who completely appear in Legends media, and who therefore do not exist in the canon continuity. For characters belonging to the canon continuity, see List of Star Wars characters.

== # ==
2V-R8
A droid serving aboard the ships of Imperial players in the Star Wars: The Old Republic video game.
8t88
A droid working with the Dark Jedi Jerec in the video game Star Wars Jedi Knight: Dark Forces II.

== A ==
Abeloth
Abeloth began as a mortal woman who came across the immortal Force entities, the Ones, on their mysterious home world. Taking on the mantle of the Mother, Abeloth helped The Father keep the peace between her warring dark side of the force Son and light side of the force Daughter for many years. However, fearing her own mortality, the Mother bathed in the Pool of Knowledge and drank from the Font of Power, in hopes of remaining with her immortal family. The result was that she became the dark side entity Abeloth. Working with the insectoid Killik race, the Ones worked together to construct Centerpoint Station, which they used to imprison Abeloth on their planet, surrounding it with a cluster of black holes, later known as the Maw. Following this Abeloth's family relocated to the mysterious planet Mortis, leaving her to her lonely prison. Millennia later, following the actions of the Sith Lord Darth Caedus, the Jedi (led by Jedi Grand Master Luke Skywalker) launched an attack on Centerpoint and destroyed the ancient space station. This resulted in the eventual destruction of Sinkhole Station, allowing Abeloth to finally leave her prison. Using her dark side powers, Abeloth possessed the charismatic Senator Rokari Kem, whom she used to assume control of the Galactic Federation of Free Alliances, as well as the Lost Tribe of the Sith (after her murder of Sith Grand Lord Darish Vol). She was eventually destroyed by the combined efforts of Skywalker and his Sith counterpart, Darth Krayt, leader of the One Sith.
Jesmin Ackbar
Niece of Admiral Gial Ackbar. Founding member of Wraith Squadron in Aaron Allston's X-wing novels.
King Adas
King of Korriban during the time of the First Sith Empire. His reign lasted nearly three hundred years, and he wielded two massive axes. He was the first Sith'ari.
Elegos A'kla
A New Republic senator. Father of Releqy A'kla.
Darth Andeddu
The self-styled "Immortal God-King of Prakith" who reigned as Dark Lord of the Sith during the Hundred-Year Darkness. He left behind a holocron that supposedly held the secret to immortality. He did appear in Star Wars canon but it was a very brief mention. One of the legions of Sith Troopers in the canon film Star Wars: The Rise of Skywalker was named after him.
Nom Anor
A Yuuzhan Vong character prominent throughout The New Jedi Order series of novels, published from 1999 to 2003. He was responsible for half of the Yuuzhan Vong invasion in the Star Wars galaxy. In the latter half of The New Jedi Order, he became an antihero as he led a heretical movement among his people to take down their ruler, Supreme Overlord Shimrra. By the series's end, having seen to the deaths of Shimrra and his puppet master Onimi, Nom Anor chose death over living in the postwar galaxy.
Bail Antilles
An Alderaanian senator; as he is the father of Breha Antilles, wife to Bail Organa, Antilles is the adoptive grandfather of Princess Leia Organa.
Arcann
The son of Valkorion, brother to Thexan and Vaylin, and temporary ruler of the Eternal Throne in the Star Wars: The Old Republic video game.
Seti Ashgad
A hyperdrive engineer working for the Incom Corporation who also served in the Galactic Senate during the days of the Clone Wars. He was known as "The Golden Tempter", and was also known for his extreme ambition and wanted to replace Palpatine as Supreme Chancellor.
Atris — voiced by Elizabeth Rider
A Jedi Council member who along with her colleagues exiled Meetra Surik, supposedly because she followed Revan to war. She established a Jedi Academy on Telos and is served by a retinue of Echani Handmaiden warriors in Knights of the Old Republic II – The Sith Lords.
Tavion Axmis
Antagonist in Star Wars Jedi Knight: Jedi Academy.
Azrakel
Apprentice of Kadann who served the Secret Order of the Empire. Azrakel was known for his disturbing and sadistic penchant for killing. Following the death of Emperor Palpatine, he becomes a mercenary operating in the Outer Rim.
Azzameen family
Protagonists in the video game Star Wars: X-Wing Alliance, including player character Ace and his father and the family patriarch Tomaas.

== B ==
B4-D4
The administrative droid that works for Czerka on Telos in the Outer Rim. It is possible to control B4-D4 in Star Wars: Knights of the Old Republic II – The Sith Lords while helping the Ithorians with their restoration project.
Darth Bandon
Apprentice of Darth Malak. Killed by Revan during the events of Knights of the Old Republic.
Bao-Dur — voiced by Roger G. Smith
A Zabrak technician from Iridonia who served under Meetra Surik during the Mandalorian Wars. He was the inventor of the Mass Shadow Generator which caused the cataclysmic events in Malachor V, and later reunites with Surik as a playable companion in Knights of the Old Republic II – The Sith Lords.
Darth Baras — voiced by Jim McCance
A Human male Dark Lord of the Sith. Veteran of the Great Galactic War and personal nemesis of Jedi Nomen Karr. He took a Sith Warrior later known as the Emperor's Wrath as his apprentice and later gets killed by them during his coup.
Garm Bel Iblis
A Republic senator and initial member of the Rebel Alliance.
Jolee Bindo
A former member of the Jedi Order and playable character in both Star Wars: Knights of the Old Republic. A known companion of Revan who aided him in his quest to find and destroy the Star Forge.
Deliah Blue
A companion of Cade Skywalker and Jariah Syn during the Sith-Imperial War in the Legacy comic series.
Blue Max
Droid that is part of Han Solo's crew in The Han Solo Adventures by Brian Daley.
Bollux
Droid that is part of Han Solo's crew in The Han Solo Adventures by Brian Daley. Renamed to Zollux for UK imprints.
Empatojayos Brand
Ancient Jedi, introduced in the Star Wars Dark Empire comic series, who sacrifices himself to help destroy the soul of the resurrected Emperor Palpatine.
Malcor Brashin — voiced by David Warner
Grand General in the Imperial Army who was heavily involved in the Battles of Tatooine and Yavin 4. He was prominently featured in Star Wars: Force Commander.
Senator Bana Breemu — portrayed by Bai Ling
Representative of the Humbarine sector in the Galactic Senate during the Galactic Republic.
Shira Brie
An Imperial Intelligence operative who infiltrated the Rebel Alliance. After nearly being killed, Brie underwent extensive cybernetic implants to become Lumiya.
Noa Briqualon — portrayed by Wilford Brimley
Marooned on Endor in Ewoks: The Battle for Endor.
Maris Brood — portrayed by Adrienne Wilkinson
Jedi in The Force Unleashed who later turns to the dark side. Starkiller spares her life on Felucia.
Broonmark
A rogue Talz commando with an obsession with death and killing. The fifth and final companion the Sith Warrior gains in Star Wars The Old Republic.

== C ==
C-3PX
Initially a normal 3PX-series protocol droid, he became, in 33 BBY, Darth Maul's reprogrammed assassin droid, but, with Darth Maul's apparent death in 32 BBY, along with the Sith shuttle Scimitar, he was confiscated by Supreme Chancellor Palpatine.
Darth Caedus
Sith Lord born as "Jacen Solo", the oldest son of Han Solo and Leia Organa Solo and Jaina Solo's twin brother. Jacen was a hero of the Yuuzhan Vong War, having personally ended it by killing their true Supreme Overlord Onimi, but years later became the evil Sith Lord Caedus. His actions as a Sith during the Second Galactic Civil War forced his sister, Jaina, to kill him.
Yomin Carr
A Yuuzhan Vong character who served as one of the antagonists in the first novel of The New Jedi Order series, Vector Prime. He was killed in combat by Mara Jade Skywalker.
CB-99
Protocol droid Jabba the Hutt used to keep his will. After his death shortly before the Battle of Endor, Zorba the Hutt, Jabba's father, reclaimed Jabba's will and everything he owned through the droid. He was first featured in the novel Zorba the Hutt's Revenge.
Jorus C'baoth
Jedi Master of the Galactic Republic who masterminded and led Project Outbound Flight, an effort to explore beyond the galaxy. The massive vessel used for this attempt was attacked by future Imperial Grand Admiral Thrawn, whom C'baoth attempted to murder after insanity drove him to the dark side, as detailed in the novel Outbound Flight. Emperor Palpatine subsequently had him cloned.
Joruus C'baoth
Insane clone of Jedi Master Jorus C'baoth and in Timothy Zahn's Thrawn trilogy.
Tycho Celchu — voiced by Timothy Omundson (Rogue Squadron III: Rebel Strike) and Jess Harnell (Jedi Knight II: Jedi Outcast)
TIE fighter pilot who defected to the Rebel Alliance and became a member of Rogue Squadron, and later became a general of the New Republic. He is a central character in Michael A. Stackpole's X-wing series of books.
Charal
Force-wielding nightsister antagonist in Battle for Endor.
Nas Choka
Yuuzhan Vong warmaster who succeeded Tsavong Lah. Surrendered on behalf of the Yuuzhan Vong after Shimrra and Onimi's deaths, ending the conflict.
Shok Choka
A Yuuzhan Vong warrior who appeared in Edge of Victory II: Rebirth, a novel in The New Jedi Order; killed in a duel to the death by Anakin Solo.
Cilghal
Mon Calamari Jedi Master and member of the Jedi Council who originally appeared as a Senator of Dac in the Jedi Academy Trilogy with an aptitude for science and healing; niece of Gial Ackbar.
Darth Cognus
Sith Lord trained by Darth Bane and Darth Zannah. She would later train Darth Millennial.
General Airen Cracken
General Airen Cracken is head of Rebel and then New Republic intelligence. He is tall with fiery red hair and has a son Lieutenant Pash Cracken. West End Games Star Wars roleplaying supplements sometimes were published as "Cracken's" guides to their topic.
Lieutenant Pash Cracken
He is the son of General Airen Cracken, head of Alliance Intelligence and a pilot. His father arranged for him to attend the Imperial flight Academy under a fake name. On his first mission, he led his squadron in defecting to the Alliance as part of an Alliance operation. He and his fellow defectors fly A-Wings for the Alliance until he joins Rogue Squadron in the novel Wedge's Gamble until he leaves in the novel The Bacta War.
Cradossk
The father of Bossk who leads the Bounty Hunters' Guild. His death at the hands of Bossk, as depicted in the novel The Mandalorian Armor, splits the Bounty Hunters' Guild into the Guild Reform Committee and the True Guild.

== D ==
Admiral Natasi Daala
Antagonist introduced in the Jedi Academy trilogy, returning in Darksaber, Planet of Twilight, and Death Star. In the Legacy of the Force series, Daala becomes the chief of state of the Galactic Federation of Free Alliances.
Da'Gara
A Yuuzhan Vong character who served as one of the antagonists in the first of The New Jedi Order novels, Vector Prime. He was killed when the world of Helska IV, which he was on, exploded because of the actions of the New Republic.
Joclad Danva
Human Jedi Knight from Attack of the Clones. Uses a green lightsaber in the Battle of Geonosis, where he is killed.
Gavin Darklighter
Cousin of Biggs Darklighter. Member and eventual leader of Rogue Squadron.
General Oro Dassyne — voiced by Terrence Carson
A Separatist General and an agent of the Corporate Alliance who commanded the CIS' forces on Bomis Koori IV.
Darth Decimus — voiced by Mark Lewis Jones
A Human male Dark Lord of the Sith who served on the Dark Council of the resurgent Sith Empire during the Cold War, and the Galactic War. He headed the Sphere of Military Strategy. He led and got killed during the Imperial Invasion of Corellia.
Gizor Delso
A Geonosian separatist who survived Darth Vader's slaughter of the remaining separatist leaders and created his own droid army. He had plans to make a new Battle Droid until Imperial Stormtroopers of the 501st Legion raided his factory on Mustafar and destroyed his plans. Gizor never made it off the planet.
Desann — voiced by Mark Klastorin
Dark Jedi antagonist in Star Wars Jedi Knight II: Jedi Outcast.
Darth Desolous
A male Pau'an Dark Lord of the Sith. Once a revered Jedi Master, he loses his proper identity after falling to the dark side of the Force. Appears in the video game Star Wars: The Force Unleashed.
Dewlanna
Female Wookiee who served on Garris Shrike's crew, and later became a surrogate mother to Han Solo.
D'harhan
Niordi bounty hunter who underwent cybernetic enhancement to have his head turned into a laser cannon. Longtime associate and ally of Boba Fett.
Orgus Din - voiced by Robert Pine
Jedi who served as the master of the Hero of Tython during the Jedi prologue in Star Wars: The Old Republic. He was also the former master of Bengel Morr, the leader of the Flesh Raiders.
Grand Moff Vilim Disra
Imperial antagonist in the Hand of Thrawn duology and in the novel Allegiance.
Teneniel Djo
Witch of Dathomir appearing in The Courtship of Princess Leia. Married to Isolder, mother of Tenel Ka.
Oakie Dokes
A female Swokes Swokes underground artist, known for her macabre art. She appears as a background character in Star Wars: Episode II – Attack of the Clones.
Hiram Drayson
Chandrilan military officer who lead the Chandrila Defense Fleet. He later became a senior officer in the New Republic Navy as commander of the Home Guard Fleet.:
Antares Draco — Portrayal by Dan Rodriguez
Antares Draco was a Human male who led the Imperial Knights during the Second Imperial Civil War. A skilled pilot and lightsaber duelist, Draco was fiercely loyal to and willing to die for Roan Fel, Emperor of the Galactic Empire and later the Empire-in-exile. Antares Draco appeared in the Dark Horse comic book series Star Wars Legacy.
Grand Moff Dunhausen
A high-ranking Imperial officer and member of the Central Committee of Grand Moffs. Dunhausen is predominantly known for two things: his scheming nature and for always wearing a pair of blaster-shaped earrings. He owns the droid 3B6-RA-7. He is first featured in the novel The Glove of Darth Vader.
Captain Dunwell
Assists Trioculus in his search for Darth Vader's glove. He was killed after his submarine explodes. First featured in the novel The Glove of Darth Vader.
Durge — voiced by Daran Norris
A Gen'Dai bounty hunter, Durge is one of the few violent members of his kind. As depicted in the Clone Wars mini series, Durge confronted Obi-Wan Kenobi on Muunilinst before being defeated by the Jedi. Perished in comics due to being in an escape pod that was jettisoned into a star.
Kyp Durron
Jedi Master who first appears in Kevin J. Anderson's Jedi Academy Trilogy as one of Luke's pupils. Briefly turned to the dark side under the influence of the spirit of Sith Lord Exar Kun, but later became a leading-if troublesome-member of the New Jedi Order.

== E ==
Captain Juno Eclipse — voiced by Nathalie Cox
Female Imperial pilot and Galen Marek's love interest in The Force Unleashed.
Bant Eerin
Female Mon Calamari childhood friend of Obi-Wan Kenobi; originally apprenticed to Jedi Master Tahl, later apprenticed to Kit Fisto following Tahl's death.
Elan
A Yuuzhan Vong in the novel Agents of Chaos I: Hero's Trial. She was sent by her superiors to infiltrate the Jedi Order and kill as many of them as possible with a deadly virus. Her efforts were foiled by Han Solo and she died as a result.
Emtrey
An M-3PO series droid that serves Rogue Squadron in the X-wing book series.

== F ==
Keyan Farlander

Rebel Alliance starfighter pilot and Jedi. The Farlander Papers enclosed with some copies of the Star Wars: X-Wing provided backstory to the game's unnamed protagonist.

Jagged Fel

Starfighter pilot and Baron Soontir Fel's son, appearing in The New Jedi Order and Legacy of the Force series. Engaged then married to Jaina Solo in the Fate of the Jedi series.

Roan Fel

Deposed Galactic Emperor in the Star Wars: Legacy series.

Baron Soontir Fel

Elite Imperial starfighter pilot in Dark Horse Comics and The New Jedi Order series. Brother-in-law to Commander Wedge Antilles. Father of Jagged Fel.

Davin Felth

Imperial stormtrooper 1023 who discovered that the escape pod that the Empire is looking for contained droids. He kills his superior officer Mod Terrik in Docking Bay 94 after becoming disgusted with the Empire's tyranny, giving the Millennium Falcon the time needed to escape from Tatooine.

Feemor

A male human Jedi Knight and the first Padawan of Qui-Gon Jin. He is the son of a farmer and is first mentioned (indirekt) in Star Wars episode I: The Visual dictionary by David West Reynolds "Qui-Gon earned the rank of Master when he trained his first Padawan apprentice to Knighthood, although his second apprentice failed to become a Knight. Obi-Wan is Qui-Gon's third Padawan and a worthy student of his wisdom and skill". He later first appears and is identified with the name Feemor in Jedi - the Drak Side 1 by Scott Allie, where he spared against Qui-Gon together with Xanatos, his Master's current Padawan. Feemor is also indirekt mentioned in some other works.

Urai Fen

The Talortai lieutenant of the Zann Consortium and right-hand man of its leader Tyber Zann. Like the rest of his species, he is Force-sensitive, though it was not a topic he liked speaking of.

Borsk Fey'lya

Bothan politician, introduced in Timothy Zahn's Thrawn trilogy. He works to promote Bothans in the New Republic in his position as a member of the provisional council. He becomes the highest ranking Bothan after the death of General Laryn Kre'fey. He also tries to manipulate a Bothan member of Rogue Squadron into damaging the public images of the human members of the squadron. He later rises to become chief of state of the New Republic. He sacrifices his life during the Yuuzhan Vong capture of Coruscant, thereby earning himself a place among the Bothan Martyrs.

Flim

Con artist employed by Moff Disra in the Hand of Thrawn duology to impersonate the deceased Grand Admiral Thrawn.

== G ==
Mirta Gev
Boba Fett's granddaughter, who first appears in Bloodlines.
G0-T0 — Voiced by Daran Norris
A droid who established a successful smuggling organization following the events of Knights of the Old Republic to help rebuild the Republic, and later joins Meetra Surik in Knights of the Old Republic II – The Sith Lords.
Tenn Graneet
Tenn Graneet was the first Death Star's Chief Gunner. As such, he was the commander of the Battle Station's Gunnery Crew and responsible for pulling the Lever that would unleash its Superlaser. After the destruction of Alderaan, Graneet was struck by Guild, labeling himself as "The Largest Mass Murderer in the Galaxy". When ordered to fire the Superlaser on Yavin IV, Graneet stalled, telling his crew and the command center to "Stand by" several times, unknowingly giving Luke Skywalker enough time to destroy the Station, killing Graneet and everyone else onboard.
Janus Greejatus
Longtime friend and associate of Palpatine; served as Palpatine's aide during his time as Senator of Naboo and the Chommell Sector, and replaced him in the position after Palpatine was elected Supreme Chancellor. After being expelled from the Galactic Senate due to questionable practices, Greejatus became Palpatine's advisor. He continued to serve in this capacity when the Galactic Empire came to power and Palpatine declared himself Emperor. He served in this capacity well into the Galactic Civil War, and was killed when the second Death Star was destroyed during the Battle of Endor.
Falon Grey
Padawan to Master Rahm Kota; two Force-sensitive clones, X1 and X2, were created from his DNA on Kamino.

== H ==
Hanharr
A Wookiee bounty hunter and a playable character in Knights of the Old Republic II – The Sith Lords.
Harrar
A recurring Yuuzhan Vong character in The New Jedi Order. By the series' end, he betrayed his species's destructive empire and sided with the Galactic Alliance to end their reign of terror.
A'Sharad Hett
A Jedi Master whose father was Sharad Hett another famous Jedi Master. After A'Sharad's father died with his native people (Sand People) he inherited his father's lightsaber and now uses both his and his fathers. Hundreds of years later, he becomes Darth Krayt and institutes "the One Sith," abolishing the Rule of Two.
Grand Moff Bertroff Hissa
Leading figure in an attempt to overthrow Ysanne Isard as the head of the Galactic Empire. Hissa founded the Central Committee of Grand Moffs, who installed Trioculus as their figurehead. First appears in the novel The Glove of Darth Vader.
HK-47 — voiced by Kristoffer Tabori
Revan's loyal assassin droid companion and a playable character in both Star Wars: Knights of the Old Republic and Knights of the Old Republic II – The Sith Lords.
Corran Horn
X-wing pilot and Jedi Master. I, Jedi is narrated from his first-person perspective. Michael Stackpole, who created the character for the X-wing series, depicts Horn in the Star Wars Customizable Card Game. Married to Mirax Terrik. He appears in several novels in the Yuuzhan Vong War and the Second Galactic War, the latter of which he serves on the Jedi Council.
Hero of Tython
A Jedi knight who saved Tython from Darth Angral's superweapon. Gets brainwashed by Emperor Vitiate and briefly turns to the dark side. Kills one of the Voices of the Emperor.
Hydra
The Grand Inquisitor appointed by Palpatine to succeed Malorum. She works with her successor as Grand Inquisitor Ferus Olin to search for a Force-sensitive child on Alderaan (Leia Organa).

== I ==
Ikrit
A furry white Jedi Master. He was trained by Yoda, and later saved his planet. He slept several centuries to be awakened by Anakin Solo. Ikrit bears resemblance to a rabbit and red panda. He appears in Junior Jedi Knights and Edge of Victory: Conquest.
Armand Isard
Father of Ysanne Isard. Member of Palpatine's Inner Circle since the Clone Wars, and served as Director of Republic Intelligence. Became Director of Imperial Intelligence after the Empire replaced the Republic. He was later betrayed and executed by either his daughter or Emperor Palpatine — most likely the former.
Ysanne Isard
Former head of Imperial Intelligence and leader of the Empire in the X-wing book series. She betrayed and executed her own father, Armand. Isard and her clone are killed in Isard's Revenge.
Irek Ismaren
Antagonist in Children of the Jedi and the New Jedi Order's Enemy Lines duology.
Prince Isolder
Character who courts Princess Leia in The Courtship of Princess Leia. Killed by Darth Caedus in Invincible. Married to Teneniel Djo, father of Tenel Ka.

== J ==
Mara Jade Skywalker — portrayed by Shannon McRandle
"Emperor's Hand" to Palpatine during his reign; Luke Skywalker's wife.
Darth Jadus — voiced by Stephen Rashbrook
A Human male Dark Lord of the Sith who served on the Dark Council of the resurgent Sith Empire. He headed the Sphere of Imperial Intelligence and the agency attached to it. Seemingly assassinated by a terrorist network he later turns out to be the leader of.
Shimrra Jamaane
The Supreme Overlord of the Yuuzhan Vong Empire who turned out to be nothing more than a puppet by the Force-sensitive Vong Shamed One Onimi. By the end of The New Jedi Order, he was killed in combat by Luke Skywalker.
Wes Janson
A fighter pilot and founding member of the elite Rogue Squadron, who was featured during one scene in The Empire Strikes Back as the gunner for Wedge Antilles's T-47 Snowspeeder. He is also heavily featured in the X-wing series and is mentioned frequently for his light-hearted, almost childlike demeanor.
Jarael
A young female Arkanian in the comic book series Star Wars: Knights of the Old Republic.
Carnor Jax
Member of the Emperor's Royal Guard who bribed the Emperor's physician to poison Palpatine's clones. Antagonist of the Crimson Empire series.
Jedgar
Apprentice of Kadann who became the leader of the Prophets of the Dark Side after the death of Kadann.
Jek-14
Sith Clone created by Count Dooku; exclusive to the Lego Star Wars shorts, beginning in The Yoda Chronicles.
Jerec — portrayed by Christopher Neame
Dark Jedi and main antagonist in Star Wars Jedi Knight: Dark Forces II.
Aric Jorgan — voiced by Timothy Omundson
Cathar member of Havoc Squad during the Cold War. He is the first companion obtained by the Trooper in Star Wars: The Old Republic. He later becomes the commanding officer of Havoc Squad when the former commanding officer disappears.
Jubnuk
One of Jabba the Hutt's Gamorrean guards. He was eaten alive by the Rancor.
Juhani
A Cathar Jedi knight and playable character in both Star Wars: Knights of the Old Republic.
Bardan Jusik
Jedi Knight who fought in the Clone Wars, later left the Jedi Order to become a medic, and eventually joined the Mandalorians.
Jeff Nakamura
A Cathar Jedi knight and playable character in both Star Wars: Knights of the Old Republic.

== K ==
K-3PX
Blue and black 3PX-series protocol droid and assassin who is Darth Vader's henchman in his search for Luke Skywalker in the 1970s/1980s Marvel Comics Star Wars series, issues #74-76 and #80 (1983).
Tenel Ka
Daughter of Isolder and Teneniel Djo, Tenel Ka was a childhood friend of Jacen and Jaina Solo at the Jedi Academy. After losing an arm during her Jedi training, Tenel Ka would serve the Jedi Order as a Knight throughout the Yuuzhan Vong War before resigning due to her commitment as the Hapan Queen Mother of the Hapes Consortium. She later became a mother with the birth of Allana, who Jacen Solo fathered. The two had a secret love, due to the Hapan population's hatred for Jedi, and after Jacen turned to the Dark Side and became Darth Caedus, Tenel Ka withdrew Hapes from the Galactic Alliance. After Caedus's defeat, Tenel Ka sent Allana to live with her grandparents, Han and Leia Solo, for her own safety.
Kadann
Dark Jedi who lead the Prophets of the Dark Side during the reign of the Galactic Empire and served as Palpatine's Supreme Prophet. Briefly cooperated with Trioculus before launching his own plan involving the grandson of the Emperor.
Captain Kael — voiced by Bruce Robertson
Captain in the Naboo Royal Security Forces during the invasion of Naboo. Featured in Star Wars: Episode I: Battle for Naboo.
Kir Kanos
Anti-hero of the Crimson Empire series. He also uses the bounty hunter pseudonym Kenix Kil.
Admiral Saul Karath
Admiral of the Sith Navy during the Jedi Civil War. Karath formerly served the Republic during the Mandalorian Wars.
Nomen Karr — voiced by Michael Gregory
Jedi who served as Jaesa Willsaam's Jedi Master. He was Darth Baras' personal nemesis and was one of the Jedi Order's most seasoned veterans during the Cold War. He was known to touch the dark side of the Force while within the lines of the Sith Empire, yet remained true to the Jedi Code. Main antagonist of Act I of the Sith Warrior story in the Star Wars: The Old Republic video game.
Talon Karrde
Smuggler introduced in Timothy Zahn's Thrawn trilogy.
Jodo Kast
A bounty hunter who wears Mandalorian armor. Is mistaken for, and later killed by, Boba Fett. Adam Rosenburg, from UGO Networks, listed Kast as the 9th worst Star Wars Expanded Universe character, calling him a "Boba Fett wannabee".
Kyle Katarn — portrayed by Jason Court (Star Wars Jedi Knight: Dark Forces II)
The player's character in the first three Jedi Knight and Dark Forces video games.
Owen Kenobi
Obi-Wan's brother, originally intended to be Owen Lars but later retconned into a separate character after the release of Star Wars: Episode II – Attack of the Clones.
Gavar Khai
Sith Saber in the Fate of the Jedi series; Vestara Khai's father.
Vestara Khai
Sith apprentice in the Fate of the Jedi series; love interest of Ben Skywalker.
Kleef — voiced by Kristoffer Tabori
Gungan mercenary operating as a member of Chop'aa Notimo's mercenary gang; kidnapped Senator Garm Bel Iblis on Notimo's orders. He was killed by Starkiller in Cloud City.
Ken
The son of Triclops and grandson of Palpatine. Born on Kessel and taken to live in the Lost City of the Jedi underneath Yavin 4. He was found by Luke Skywalker, who then inducted him into the Rebel Alliance. First appears in The Lost City of the Jedi.
Jaden Korr — voiced by Phillip Tanzini & Jennifer Hale
Apprentice of Kyle Katarn. Main protagonist of Star Wars: Jedi Knight: Jedi Academy.
General Rahm Kota — voiced by Cully Frederickson
Jedi Master who served as a General during the Clone Wars; managed to survive Order 66 and escape to Nar Shaddaa. In The Force Unleashed, he attacks an Imperial TIE fighter facility with a band of militia. Originally an enemy to Darth Vader's apprentice, Starkiller, but later becomes his mentor. Is also considered a founding member of the Rebel Alliance.
Krayn
Slave-trader who often conducted raids on Tatooine. Killed by Anakin Skywalker on a mission to Nar Shaddaa.
Darth Krayt
The main antagonist of the Star Wars: Legacy comic series. Formerly known as A'Sharad Hett, he served during the Clone Wars. He managed to survive the early stages of the Great Jedi Purge and exiled himself to Tatooine, but fled Tatooine after encountering Obi-Wan Kenobi. He fled to Korriban, where he was trained as a Sith Lord. After several hundred years in an extended periods of stasis, Krayt formed the One Sith and overthrew the Galactic Federation of Free Alliances, forming a new Sith Empire in its place.
Ludo Kressh
Sith Lord who lived during the Great Hyperspace War. He was Naga Sadow's greatest rival, and fought him for the title of Dark Lord of the Sith following the death of Marka Ragnos.
Ganner Krieg —Portrayal by Thomas Spanos(Legacy)
Ganner Krieg was a Human male Master of the Imperial Knights who served Emperor Roan Fel's Empire-in-exile during the Second Imperial Civil War. Noted for his calm and serious demeanor, Krieg was a trusted friend of fellow Knight Antares Draco and was often paired with him on missions during the war. Ganner Krieg appeared in the Dark Horse comic book series Star Wars Legacy.
K'Kruhk — voiced by Kevin Michael Richardson
Whipid Jedi Master who fought during the Clone Wars and survived the Great Jedi Purge. He lived from around the end of the Galactic Republic to the time of the One Sith and the Second Imperial Civil War.
Exar Kun
Fallen Jedi who led the Brotherhood of the Sith against the Jedi and the Galactic Republic during the Great Sith War, later establishes a dark side presence on Yavin 4.
An'ya Kuro
Also known as "the Dark Woman", Kuro was a Jedi Master who fought in the Clone Wars. She was Aurra Sing's Master before Sing left the Jedi to become a bounty hunter, and was also A'Sharad Hett's second Jedi Master. She has the distinction of being the final Jedi killed during the Great Jedi Purge.
Kira Carsen - voiced by Laura Bailey
A Jedi in the Old Republic era. She was the Padawan to the Hero of Tython. Secretly she was one of the Children of the Emperor, having escaped from Korriban and was found by the Jedi Order.

== L ==
Warmaster Tsavong Lah
The first Warmaster during the Yuuzhan Vong invasion. Following his demise in the novel Destiny's Way, he was replaced by Nas Choka.
Bevel Lemelisk
Noted engineer and architect who was known particularly for his creation of superweapons; he designed six, five of them for the Galactic Empire, including both the first and the second Death Stars.
Xamuel Lennox — portrayed by John Dicks
Imperial navy captain who served in Darth Vader's Death Squadron as captain of the Star Destroyer Tyrant.
Garik "Face" Loran
Former Imperial propagandist child actor. Defected to become a Rebel pilot and leader of Wraith Squadron in Aaron Allston's X-wing novels.
Lowbacca
Wookiee Jedi Knight and Chewbacca's nephew. UGO Networks listed the character as the 11th worst Expanded Universe character, saying that while they did not have any problems with the character as a whole, his name "has got to go".
Lumiya
Introduced in Marvel's Star Wars comics as an Imperial Intelligence operative called "Shira Brie" who serves a foil for Luke Skywalker after the fall of the Empire. She returns in the Legacy of the Force series, where she trains Jacen Solo in the ways of the Sith and turns him to the dark side of the Force.

== M ==
Mako — voiced by Lacey Chabert
The first (romance-able) companion in the Bounty Hunter story line of the MMORPG Star Wars: The Old Republic.
Darth Malak — voiced by Rafael Ferrer
Darth Revan's apprentice; the main antagonist of Star Wars: Knights of the Old Republic.
Darth Malgus — voiced by Jamie Glover
A Sith Lord and central character featured in Star Wars The Old Republic. Veteran of the Great Galactic War and leader of the New Empire.
Malorum
The first Grand Inquisitor; the first main antagonist of Star Wars: The Last of the Jedi.
Kento Marek — voiced by Tom Kane
Jedi knight and the father of Starkiller. Darth Vader discovers him hiding on Kashyyyk and kills him at the beginning of Star Wars: The Force Unleashed, then takes his young son as his secret apprentice.
Mallie Marek
Jedi knight and wife of Kento Marek. She is killed by Trandoshan slavers shortly after the birth of her son.
Darth Marr — voiced by Michael Harney
A Human male Dark Lord of the Sith who served on the Dark Council of the resurgent Sith Empire during the Great Galactic War, the Cold War, and the Galactic War. He headed the Sphere of Defense of the Empire. Unofficially lead the Sith Empire after Emperor Vitiate's betrayal.
Visas Marr — voiced by Kelly Hu
A Miraluka Dark Jedi and the former apprentice of Darth Nihilus. She later defected and becomes a playable companion of Meetra Surik in Knights of the Old Republic II – The Sith Lords.
Darth Maul's doppelgänger
A doppelgänger of Darth Maul created through Sith alchemy dueling Darth Vader on Kalakar Six in the comic strip "Resurrection" in Star Wars Tales #9.
Mira — voiced by Emily Berry
A bounty hunter and a playable character in Knights of the Old Republic II – The Sith Lords.
MD-5
A medical droid serving Trioculus that first appears in The Glove of Darth Vader.
Darth Millennial
A three-eyed mutant Sith Lord who could see into the future. He believed that he was a prophet chosen by the will of the Force and would become the founder of the Prophets of the Dark Side.
Callista Ming
A Jedi spirit Luke encounters in Children of the Jedi; she is revived and becomes Luke's lover. Prequel era books establish that her surname was originally Masana, and she fought in the Clone Wars.
General Rom Mohc — voiced by Jack Angel
Creator of the Dark Trooper program in Dark Forces and the game's final boss.
Kasan Moor — voiced by Olivia Hussey
Former commander of the 128th TIE Interceptor Squadron, member of Rogue Squadron. Featured in the video game Star Wars: Rogue Squadron.
Bengel Morr — voiced by Victor Slezak
Nautolan Dark Jedi who was originally Orgus Din's Padawan. He was initially thought to have been killed during the Sacking of Coruscant, but instead was left insane. He later becomes the leader of the Flesh Raiders on Tython, and plans to rebuild the Jedi Order into a weapon to destroy the Sith. He serves as the main antagonist of the Hero of Tython's prologue in Star Wars: The Old Republic. He is later cured of his insanity.
Kud'ar Mub'at
The only known fully developed member of the Assembler species. He served as a go-between and middleman for many of the less legal activities of the galaxy. Prominent character in The Bounty Hunter Wars series.
Karness Muur
One of the first Sith Lords, a former Jedi who turned to the Dark Side during the Hundred-Year Darkness. He served as the main antagonist of the comic series Vector, which spanned Knights of the Old Republic, Dark Times, Rebellion and Legacy. He was the inventor of the Rakghoul Plague.
Grand Moff Muzzer
An Imperial Grand Moff featured in the novel The Glove of Darth Vader. He is shot in the leg by Tibor, Zorba the Hutt's personal bounty hunter, when the Moffship pulls the Zorba Express into the moffship, but survives.
Jobin Mothma
Member of the rebel alliance and son of Mon Mothma, who died during the battle of Hoth.

== N ==
Darred Janred Naberrie
Husband of Sola Naberrie and father of Ryoo Naberrie & Pooja Naberrie. He is also the uncle of Luke Skywalker and Leia Organa.
Freedon Nadd
A Jedi turned Sith in the Tales of the Jedi series. He was the main instigator in Exar Kun's fall to the dark side.
Darth Nihl
Nagai warlord who became a member of Darth Krayt's One Sith, and later became his chief enforcer. Following Krayt's death and the dissolution of his empire, Nihl assumed leadership of the surviving members of the One Sith.
Darth Nihilus
One of the antagonists of Star Wars: Knights of the Old Republic II – The Sith Lords, and a member of the Sith Triumvirate. The sole survivor of his planet's destruction, Nihilus became singularly focused on draining the Force from all living beings to satisfy his eternal hunger for the Force.
Ona Nobis
Sorrusian bounty hunter who primarily captured test subjects for Jenna Zan Arbor so Zan Arbor could conduct her experiments on the Force. She used the alias "Reesa On".
Chop'aa Notimo — voiced by Billy Brown
Mandalorian mercenary and crime lord who orchestrated the kidnapping of Senator Garm Bel Iblis. He was killed by Starkiller in Cloud City.
N`Kata Del Gormo
Hylsalrian Jedi Master who taught Yoda.

== O ==
Astri Oddo
Friend of Obi-Wan Kenobi and ally of the Jedi Order. She is a prominent character in all of the Star Wars book series written by Jude Watson.
Ferus Olin
Former Jedi Padawan who joined Obi-Wan Kenobi in searching for any Jedi who survived Order 66 and the subsequent Great Jedi Purge. Main protagonist of Jude Watson's The Last of the Jedi series and former rival of Anakin Skywalker.
Cal Omas
Politician and leader of the Galactic Federation of Free Alliances in The New Jedi Order and Legacy of the Force series.
Omega Squad
A four-man Republic Commando unit featured in the books Star Wars Republic Commando: Hard Contact, Star Wars Republic Commando: Triple Zero, Star Wars Republic Commando: True Colors, and Star Wars Imperial Commando: 501st.
Granta Omega
The son of the Dark Jedi Xanatos who wanted revenge on the Jedi Order, blaming them for the death of his father. He became enemies with Obi-Wan Kenobi in particular, battling him multiple times. He is one of the central antagonists of the Jedi Quest book series.
Carth Onasi — voiced by Raphael Sbarge
Companion of Revan who aided him in his quest to find and destroy the Star Forge. He is the pilot of the Ebon Hawk and a playable character in Star Wars: Knights of the Old Republic.
Onimi
Depicted throughout most of the New Jedi Order series as a "shamed one", The Unifying Force reveals that Onimi in fact controls Overload Shimrra. Jacen Solo kills Onimi in the series' final book.
Canderous Ordo — voiced by John Cygan
A Mandalorian warrior who fought in the Mandalorian Wars, and later becomes ruler of Mandalore under the name "Mandalore the Preserver". He is a playable character in both Star Wars: Knights of the Old Republic and Knights of the Old Republic II – The Sith Lords.
Orrin
a male Neimoidian ally of the CIS during the Clone Wars.
Jan Ors
Voiced and played by Angela Harry (Jedi Knight), Julie Eccles (voice, Dark Forces), Vanessa Marshall (voice, Jedi Outcast): Kyle Katarn's pilot and love interest.
General Otto — voiced by Tom Kane
Imperial officer who deserted the Empire. First appears in the game Star Wars: Demolition and appears later in Star Wars Galaxies.
Outlander
Player character in Star Wars: The Old Republic in the Knights of the Fallen Empire expansion and onward.

== P ==
Ajunta Pall
Leader of the Dark Jedi of the Hundred Year Darkness and the first Dark Lord of the Sith. In Star Wars: Knights of the Old Republic, his spirit continues to haunt his tomb on Korriban before being redeemed by Revan.
Kazdan Paratus — voiced by Larry Drake
Aleena Jedi Master and survivor of the Great Jedi Purge living in exile on the junk world Raxus Prime. He descended into insanity after Order 66 was carried out, and was killed by Starkiller on Darth Vader's orders.
Jax Pavan
Male human survivor of Order 66 and protagonist in the Coruscant Nights series.
Gilad Pellaeon
Imperial officer introduced in Timothy Zahn's Thrawn trilogy who rises to lead the Imperial Remnant. He also appears in the Clone Wars novel No Prisoners as a captain for the Republic. Though initially a Legends character, Pellaeon was re-introduced into canon works in Zahn's Thrawn: Treason, and made his live-action debut in the third season of The Mandalorian.
Rosh Penin
The student of Kyle Katarn in the Jedi Knight: Jedi Academy game.
Sate Pestage
Longtime advisor and right-hand of Palpatine, serving as his advisor during his days as a Senator and Supreme Chancellor and later as the Grand Vizier of the Galactic Empire. Following Palpatine's death at the Battle of Endor, Pestage took his place as Emperor, but was later betrayed by the other Imperial Advisors when he agreed to turn Coruscant over to the New Republic. He was executed by Ysanne Isard's agents.
Gara Petothel
Imperial Security Bureau (ISB) agent who defected to Warlord Zsinj's forces after the fall of the Empire. During an undercover mission infiltrating Wraith Squadron, she defects again to the side of New Republic forces.
Lieutenant Pierce — voiced by Adam Leadbeater
A male human Imperial Black Ops Trooper. The fourth companion the Sith Warrior gains in Star Wars The Old Republic.
PROXY — voiced by David W. Collins
Starkiller's personal holodroid; Starkiller used PROXY for training and for sending and receiving messages. Despite PROXY and Starkiller's friendship, PROXY would routinely attempt to kill Starkiller on a regular basis, as it was his primary directive.
Pugwis
He is the Dug grandson of podracing champion Sebulba.

== Q ==
Ulic Qel-Droma
Jedi/Sith in the Tales of the Jedi series.
Ooryl Qrygg
A Gand member of Rogue Squadron in Michael A. Stackpole's X-wing series.
Danni Quee
New Jedi Order scientist whose research helps in the fight against the Yuuzhan Vong in the New Jedi Order series.
Sarcev Quest
Former Jedi initiate who later became Supreme Chancellor Palpatine's personal spy, and later, one of the first Emperor's Hands following the rise of the Galactic Empire.
Malavai Quinn — voiced by Richard Teverson
A male human Imperial operative under the protection of Darth Baras. The second companion the Sith Warrior gains in Star Wars The Old Republic.

== R ==
Vuffi Raa
Lando Calrissian's droid companion in The Adventures of Lando Calrissian.
Ahri Raas
A Keshiri male. Childhood friend of Vestara Khai.
Marka Ragnos
Dark Lord of the Sith who lived during the time of the first Sith Empire. Following his death, he lived on as a force ghost and decreed that only the most worthy could succeed him as Dark Lord of the Sith.
Qu Rahn — portrayed by Bennett Gilroy
Jedi Master killed by Jerec in Star Wars: Jedi Knight: Dark Forces II; his ghost appears to and guides Kyle Katarn later in the game, offering guidance.
Atton Rand — voiced by Nicky Katt
A companion of Meetra Surik who once fought in the Mandalorian Wars and Jedi Civil War. He is the pilot of the Ebon Hawk and a playable character in Knights of the Old Republic II – The Sith Lords.
Alema Rar
A female Twi'lek Jedi who falls under the control of the insectoid Killiks during the Dark Nest trilogy. She betrays the Jedi and is nearly defeated by Leia Organa. An increasing unstable and vengeful Alema hunts Leia throughout the rest of the Dark Nest novels and much of the Legacy of the Force series.
Kybo Ren (Gir Kybo Ren-Cha) — voiced by Don Francks
A Ropagu space pirate from Tarnoonga and main antagonist in some episodes of Star Wars: Droids.
Dash Rendar — voiced by John Cygan
A smuggler developed for the Shadows of the Empire multimedia project, prominently appearing as the protagonist of the Shadows of the Empire video game.
Gault Rennow
The second companion that the Bounty Hunter in SWTOR gains.
Revan — voiced by Rino Romano
A Jedi Knight turned Sith Lord who was betrayed by his own apprentice, Darth Malak. He later returns to the Jedi Order and seeks out and destroys the Star Forge. He is the main protagonist of Star Wars: Knights of the Old Republic and the main antagonist of the Shadow of Revan expansion of Star Wars The Old Republic.
Rookie One — portrayed by Jamison Jones (Rebel Assault II)
The player's character in Rebel Assault and Rebel Assault II.
Darth Ruin
Umbaran Sith Lord during the New Sith Wars.

== S ==
Voort "Piggy" saBinring
Genetically modified Gamorrean, given genius-level intellect. A pilot and eventual leader of Wraith Squadron in Aaron Allston's X-wing novels.
Naga Sadow
Dark side magician and Dark Lord of the Sith during the first Sith Empire. He attempted to conquer the Republic, but ultimately failed after he was betrayed by Gav Daragon. He entered stasis on Yavin 4, and was reawakened 600 years later by Freedon Nadd, who killed him after his training was finished. The junior novelization of The Rise of Skywalker references Sadow.
Sage-Boneria
Young female briefly mentioned in the books as the first Twi'lek Jedi.
Thrackan Sal-Solo
Han Solo's cousin and an antagonist in the Corellian trilogy. His parents are Randil Sal and Tiion Gama Sal-Solo.
Tyria Sarkin
Force-sensitive pilot of Wraith Squadron in Aaron Allston's X-wing novels. Later attains Jedi Knighthood.
Sarkli — voiced by Robin Atkin Downes
Former Rebel pilot who defected to the Empire, where he served on the second Death Star and participated in the Battle of Endor. He is Admiral Piett's nephew.
Admiral Sarn — voiced by Gary Martinez
Leader of the TIE Phantom program in Star Wars: Rebel Assault II: The Hidden Empire.
Saba Sebatyne
A female Barabel who joined Luke Skywalker's reformed Jedi Order, as a Jedi Knight she served in the Yuuzhan Vong War, fighting in several important campaigns against the Yuuzhan Vong invaders. After the war she was promoted to the rank of Jedi Master. During the Dark Nest Crisis about 10 years after the Yuuzhan Vong War she took Leia Organa Solo as her apprentice. After the Second Galactic Civil War Natasi Daala became Chief of State of the Galactic Alliance, Daala, a former admiral of the Imperial Navy, fostered widespread Anti-Jedi sentiment, and had Grand Master Luke Skywalker exiled from the Jedi Order and made Kenth Hamner Grand Master in his stead.
Moff Kohl Seerdon — voiced by Neil Ross
The main antagonist in Star Wars: Rogue Squadron.
Shedao Shai
A supreme commander and the advance leader for the Yuuzhan Vong invasion of the Star Wars galaxy at the beginning of The New Jedi Order series. Corran Horn defeats Shai in a duel.
Bastila Shan — voiced by Jennifer Hale
Love interest of Revan and a playable character in Star Wars: Knights of the Old Republic; she saves him after Darth Malak attacks his ship. Briefly turns to the dark side, but is redeemed by Revan.
Satele Shan — voiced by Jennifer Hale
Grand Master of the Jedi Order in Star Wars: The Old Republic set centuries after Star Wars: Knights of the Old Republic; a direct descendant of Bastila Shan.
Echuu Shen-Jon
Former Padawan to Mace Windu who served as a Jedi General during the Clone Wars. Went into hiding after Order 66 was given, and re-emerged during the Galactic Civil War to fight for the Rebel Alliance.
Garris Shrike
Corellian criminal and former bounty hunter who raised Han Solo, introduced in Ann C. Crispin's 1997 novel The Paradise Snare.
Fenn Shysa
Mandalorian mercenary who fought for the Separatists in the Clone Wars and later led a resistance against the Imperial occupation of Mandalore. Appears in Star Wars comics and Star Wars Republic Commando (series).
Darth Sion — voiced by Louis Mellis
One of the three concurrent Dark Lords of the Sith in Star Wars: Knights of the Old Republic II – The Sith Lords.
Kal Skirata
Mandalorian mercenary hired to train clone commandos on Kamino, featured in the Republic Commando novels.
Ben Skywalker
Luke Skywalker's and Mara Jade Skywalker's son. Jedi Knight. Former student of Jacen Solo, his cousin. Former GAG (Galactic Alliance Guard) member. In Fate of the Jedi: Outcast, he voluntarily accompanies his father into exile. He proves himself as both a fighter and as an investigator. His love interest is Vestara Khai [Sith Apprentice in Abyss-Conviction] [Jedi Apprentice Ascension] [Sith Lady Apocalypse].
Cade Skywalker
Descendant of Luke and Mara Jade Skywalker and protagonist of the Star Wars: Legacy comic series. Allegedly had the power to bring back the dead (Suspicion of Darth Krayt).
Kol Skywalker
Father of Cade Skywalker. Member of the Jedi Council during the Star Wars: Legacy comic series.
Luuke Skywalker
A clone of Luke Skywalker, created by Joruus C'baoth in the Thrawn Trilogy. Luuke was chosen by UGO Network's Adam Rosenburg as the worst Star Wars Expanded Universe character, heavily criticising his name and calling him a "stupid clone".
Anakin Solo
Youngest son of Han and Leia Organa Solo.
Allana Solo
Jacen Solo's and Tenel Ka's daughter in the Legacy of the Force series. Adopted by Han Solo and Leia Organa Solo at the end of Invincible and given the name Amelia in public to keep her true parentage a secret.
Jaina Solo
The daughter of Han Solo and Leia Organa Solo, and Jacen Solo's twin sister. Jedi Knight.
Kam Solusar
former Dark Jedi apprentice of Darth Vader, one of Luke Skywalker's first apprentices, and later a Jedi Master of the New Jedi Order. He is married to Tionne, with whom he serves as one of the instructors at the Jedi academies on Yavin 4 and Ossus.
Tionne Solusar
Chief librarian of the New Jedi Order, the wife of Kam Solusar, and one of the instructors at the Jedi academies on Yavin 4 and Ossus
Uta S'orn
Senator who represented the planet Belasco in the Galactic Senate. In the novel Jedi Apprentice: The Dangerous Rescue, she secretly worked with her friend Jenna Zan Arbor to poison Belasco's water supply; the Jedi Order foils this plot and she is sent to a prison planet.
Starkiller / Galen Marek
The former apprentice of Darth Vader in Star Wars: The Force Unleashed. Also the name of Marek's clone, who serves as the main playable character in Star Wars: The Force Unleashed II.
Maarek Stele
An Imperial starfighter ace.
Captain Ozzik Sturn — voiced by Tom Kane
Commander of the Imperial forces on Kashyyyk in Star Wars: The Force Unleashed. Kidnaps Princess Leia Organa in an attempt to prevent her father from causing rebellion against the Empire.
Nomi Sunrider
A Jedi in several Dark Horse Comics Old Republic-era series.
Meetra Surik
A Jedi that followed Revan into the Mandalorian Wars, becoming a Jedi Crusader and General in Revan's army. She ended the War by activating the Mass Shadow Generator on Malachor V, nearly destroying the planet and killing most combatants on both sides. Her quest for redemption, regaining her connection to the Force, defeating the Sith Triumvirate and restoring the Jedi Order is told in the video game Star Wars: Knights of the Old Republic II: The Sith Lords.

== T ==
T3-M4
A loyal astromech droid companion and playable character in both Star Wars: Knights of the Old Republic and Knights of the Old Republic II – The Sith Lords.
Siri Tachi — voiced by Corie Henninger (in Star Wars: Jedi Starfighter)
Jedi Knight who served as Padawan to Adi Gallia and later became Master to Ferus Olin. She was also a love interest of Obi-Wan Kenobi, the two having known each other as Padawans, but they chose to break off their relationship. She was also a very talented pilot, but died during the Clone Wars.
Tagge family
The powerful family of Imperial general Cassio Tagge, known as the House of Tagge. Cassio's brothers Orman, Silas, and Ulric are active in the Empire, particularly the family baron Orman, who wishes to take revenge against Darth Vader for taking his vision (for which he now has a cybernetic device), and wants to gain the emperor's favor by slaying Luke and his rebel friends. Orman, practiced with a lightsaber, is killed by Luke when Vader casts an illusion making it appear that Orman is him. Silas, a scientist, took over for Orman while he was temporarily incapacitated; Silas was later kept in an unconscious state by Vader. Ulric, the youngest brother, is an Imperial general and becomes the family baron after Orman's death. The youngest sibling, Domina, is the member of a nature cult, before being temporarily named its high priestess and trying to murder both Luke and Vader.
Tahl
First Jedi Master of Bant Eerin and a librarian of the Jedi Archives. Love interest of Qui-Gon Jinn who later died before he could come to her rescue.
Kell Tainer
Founding member of Wraith Squadron in Aaron Allston's X-wing novels.
Darth Talon
Twi'lek Sith Lord who served Darth Krayt as one of his two Hands, or enforcers. She also briefly served as Cade Skywalker's Sith Master before Cade renounced the One Sith.
Sev'rance Tann
A female Chiss and Dark Jedi; one of Count Dooku's dark acolytes who also became a general in the Separatist Droid Army. Was killed only a month after the beginning of the war.
Baron Merillion Tarko — voiced by Dee Bradley Baker
Imperial Moff who controls the Empire's operations on the planet Cato Neimoidia in Star Wars: The Force Unleashed II.
Darth Tenebrous
A Bith Sith Lord and the mentor of Darth Plagueis, who was overthrown by his apprentice.
Booster Terrik
Smuggler who becomes Corran Horn's father-in-law in the X-wing series and helps protect Jedi children in the New Jedi Order series.
Mirax Terrik
Smuggler who becomes Corran Horn's wife in the X-wing series.
Mod Terrik
Imperial stormtrooper captain who was shot in the back by subordinate fellow stormtrooper Davin Felth while attempting to kill or capture Han Solo and his human and droid cargo.
Bria Tharen
A woman whom Han Solo rescues from slavery in The Han Solo Trilogy. She later joins the Rebel Alliance and helps the Rebels secure the plans to the first Death Star. After being surrounded along with her team and facing capture by the Empire, Tharen takes a "lullaby" suicide pill rather than risk betraying the Rebellion due to torture.
Grand Moff Thistleborn
He was a loyal member of the Central Committee of Grand Moffs. He was first featured in the novel The Glove of Darth Vader.
Raynar Thul
Jedi whose personality is altered by joining with the Kiliks in the Dark Nest Crisis series.
Tibor
A Barabel bounty hunter who assists Zorba the Hutt. First appears in Zorba the Hutt's Revenge.
Major Grodin Tierce
In Timothy Zahn's The Hand of Thrawn series, Tierce is the clone of a stormtrooper of the same name. Thrawn, who created the clone as part of an experiment, added some of his own DNA in an effort to create a brilliant tactician; the project was abandoned as Tierce possessed tactical intellect with a stormtrooper's brutish approach.
Rufaan Tigellinus
Imperial Grand Admiral and Grand Moff known for his political savvy and charisma. Following Palpatine's death at the Battle of Endor, he attempted to join the Central Committee of Grand Moffs, but changed his mind and was executed under charges of treason.
Tikkes
Separatist Council member and Senator of the CIS-allied Quarren Isolation League on Mon Calamari. Led one of the Separatist assaults on Mon Calamari; killed by Darth Vader on Mustafar.
Torbin, the Grand Inquisitor
The Grand Inquisitor and servant of Palpatine in the Star Wars Sourcebook and Dark Empire, born Laddinare Torbin.
Sergeant Derek Torent
Senior watch trooper aboard the first Death Star. Recognizable by their wide black helmets, a Death Star Trooper was created from Kenner's first 12 action figures in 1977; Torent was depicted on the figure's packaging, although the actual figure was dubbed Death Squad Commander and later Star Destroyer Commander.
Darth Traya — voiced by Sara Kestelman
One of the three concurrent Dark Lords of the Sith in Knights of the Old Republic II. She was formerly known as Kreia and was once a Jedi Master of Revan.
Si Treemba
One of Obi-Wan's Arconan friends.
Antinnis Tremayne
Dark Jedi Apprentice of Darth Vader; prominent member of the Inquisitorius.
Triclops
Created from extracting the DNA from Palpatine and inserted into a woman named Niobi. He was born mutated with a third eye in the back of his head. Thought to be more powerful than his father, he was sent into exile. Has a son named Ken. Later found by Luke Skywalker and joined the Alliance. First appears in Mission from Mount Yoda.
Trioculus
The self-proclaimed son of Palpatine and the ruler of half of the Empire. First appears in The Glove of Darth Vader.
Longo Two-Guns — voiced by Tom Kane
Crime lord who was a rival to Jabba the Hutt. He was recognized as the "fastest blaster on Tatooine".

== U ==
Odan-Urr
Draethos male Jedi Librarian who commissioned The Great Library of Ossus following the Great Hyperspace War, a massive library and training ground erected by the Jedi Order on the planet Ossus. Apprentice to the Celegian Jedi Master Ooroo, Odan-Urr studied history, ancient Jedi techniques, and the lore of the Jedi Order. Odan-Urr was particularly interested in the history of the Sith. Master Ooroo permitted him to study the lore of the Sith because he believed Odan-Urr would never stray from the Light Side of The Force. Odan-Urr became a Jedi Master four centuries after Ooroo's death and served the Jedi for another six centuries. During this time, Odan-Urr studied the Jedi Code in depth. He believed that the only way to truly master The Force was to first fully understand the Jedi Code. As such, he revised the Jedi Code so that it may serve as the avenue for true mastery of The Force.

== V ==
Valkorion - voiced by Doug Bradley, Darin De Paul, and Anthony Skordi
A Sith Lord who reconstituted the Sith Empire after its destruction in the Great Hyperspace War and went on to rule it for over 1300 years. He is commonly known simply as the Sith Emperor, though his original name was Tenebrae, and he was also christened Vitiate. To the people of the Eternal Empire he is known as Valkorion. He is the central underlying antagonist of the massively multiplayer online role-playing game Star Wars: The Old Republic. He achieved immense power by performing rituals that killed the population of entire planets, and he also learned to transfer his consciousness into different hosts. As the Sith Emperor he gets defeated by the Jedi Hero of Tython. As Valkorion he is vanquished by the Outlander, and the last vestige of his spirit attempting to take control of Satele Shan is destroyed in a mental confrontation with the souls of his victims as well as history's champions, including Revan and Meetra Surik.
Mission Vao — voiced by Catherine Taber
Twi'lek companion of Revan who aided him in his quest to find and destroy the Star Forge. She is the best friend of Zaalbar, and a playable character in Star Wars: Knights of the Old Republic.
Shado Vao
Padawan of Jedi Council member Kol Skywalker at the time of the Sith's massacre of the Jedi on Ossus in the Star Wars: Legacy comics.
Walon Vau
Mandalorian mercenary who was hired to train clone commandos on Kamino. He was violent with his commandos. Delta Squad is one of Vau's squads. Featured prominently in the Republic Commando book series.
Morlish Veed
Grand Moff and Grand Admiral who acted as Lord Regent of Darth Krayt's Sith Empire. He served as Krayt's military commander and one of his best servants.
Tahiri Veila
Anakin Solo's best friend, love interest, a victim of Yuuzhan Vong brainwashing, and briefly Darth Caedus' apprentice. Brought back to the light by Ben Skywalker. She was raised by Tusken Raiders, after they killed her parents, and trained as a Jedi after being discovered by Luke Skywalker.
Ailyn Vel
Boba Fett's daughter, appears in Bloodlines. Designs to kill her father, Boba Fett, as she believes he abandoned both her mother and she when she is captured by Jacen Solo's Galactic Army Guard. She dies under interrogation by Jacen, further pushing him towards the Dark Side of the Force and his ultimate rebirth as Darth Caedus.
Sintas Vel
Boba Fett's wife, mentioned in Bloodlines. Appears in Revelation.
Nawara Ven
Twi'lek lawyer and pilot of Rogue Squadron in Michael A. Stackpole's X-wing novels.
Darth Vowrawn — voiced by Christopher Godwin
A Sith Pureblood male Dark Lord of the Sith who served on the Dark Council of the resurgent Sith Empire during the Cold War, and the Galactic War. He headed the Sphere of Production and Logistics. Rival of Darth Baras, and ally of the Sith Warrior player character in Star Wars: The Old Republic.
Vergere
Jedi who lives among the Yuuzhan Vong and offers Jacen Solo insight into their culture and connection to the Force. She is later revealed by Lumiya to have been a Sith Acolyte.
Vette — voiced by Catherine Taber
A female Twi'lek and the first (romanceable) companion of the Sith Warrior class in the MMORPG video game Star Wars: The Old Republic.
Vima-Da-Boda
Fallen Old Republic Jedi introduced in Dark Empire. Regains her connection to the Force after aiding Leia Organa Solo in Dark Empire II and Empire's End./ V /
Komari Vosa — voiced by Tamara Phillips
Dark Jedi and leader of the Bando Gora cult. She is the main antagonist of Star Wars: Bounty Hunter. After Jango Fett kills her, Count Dooku keeps her lightsabers and later gives them to Asajj Ventress.

== W ==
Iella Wessiri Antilles
Corran Horn's Corellian Security Force partner who later joins the Rebellion and becomes an agent for the New Republic Intelligence Service. She eventually marries Wedge Antilles, with whom she has two daughters, Syal and Myri.
Jaesa Willsaam — voiced by Rachael Leigh Cook
Jedi Padawan who was later turned to the dark side and became the apprentice of the Sith Warrior in Star Wars: The Old Republic. She had a very rare and unique power, similar to Force sight, that allowed her to see the alignment and personality traits of other people.
Winter
A Rebel agent known as "Targeter" who goes on to be an aide to Leia Organa Solo and Admiral Ackbar. In the expanded universe she marries Tycho Celchu. She cares for Admiral Ackbar as he gets old and is with him when he dies. She also, in the Fate of the Jedi Series, aids Jaina Solo and the Darkmeld in their missions. She also took care of Jacen, Jaina and Anakin Solo when they were little. They originally considered her their mother, not Leia, because she had taken care of them.
Darth Wyyrlok
Chagrian Sith Lord who served as Darth Krayt's second-in-command. Briefly replaced Krayt as Emperor after Krayt's apparent death, but was killed by Krayt after he was resurrected. He was the third generation of his family to take the name "Darth Wyyrlok".

== X ==
X1
Force-sensitive clone trooper and antagonist in Star Wars Battlefront: Elite Squadron.
X2
Force-sensitive clone trooper and protagonist in Elite Squadron.
Xanatos
In Jude Watson's Jedi Apprentice series, Xanatos is the former padawan of Qui-Gon Jinn who turned to the dark side of the Force. Taken in for Jedi training at a higher age than most prospective Jedi, he remembered his wealthy father Crion and later became obsessed with the power of wealth and prestige. During his final mission as a Padawan, he was reunited with his father and sided with him during a war to take control of their planet, only for his father to be killed during the final battle of the war by Qui-Gon-who had sided with the people. Xanatos became obsessed with revenge, founding the Offworld Corporation and amassing a vast fortune and power. He engaged Qui-Gon and Obi-Wan on numerous occasions before committing suicide in favor of being taken captive by them. He was later revealed to have a son, Granta Omega, who disappointed Xanatos due to not being Force-sensitive.
Xasha
A character in Star Wars: The Force Unleashed II (graphic novel) Also, nicknamed "X". She was a female bounty hunter who, in 1 BBY, lived with Boba Fett on Nar Shaddaa and wore a customized armored-suit composed of pieces from both Mandalorian and Clone trooper armor. As Fett's occasional partner, she followed him to Cato Neimoidia, shortly after Fett received a mission from Darth Vader to apprehend a renegade clone of the late Galen Marek
Prince Xizor
A character in Shadows of the Empire. Little is known about his past. He is a Falleen and head of the Black Sun criminal syndicate, depicted "like the Godfather with a reptilian overlay". He puts a hit on Luke Skywalker, so that Darth Vader will suffer the emperor's wrath and he will become his apprentice and his grip on the galaxy will be supreme. He has the ability to secrete pheromones, which he can use to attract women. He tried this with only partial success on Leia. According to Forces of Corruption, Xizor is apparently killed after the game's protagonist frames him. The character's name was inspired by a Portuguese name, Xico.

== Y ==
Ja'ce Yiaso
a Zabrak who served as Grand Inquisitor under Palpatine in Star Wars Galaxies: Jump to Lightspeed.

== Z ==
Zaalbar
Wookiee companion of Revan who aided him in his quest to find and destroy the Star Forge. He is the best friend of Mission Vao, and a playable character in Star Wars: Knights of the Old Republic.
Demetrius Zaarin
Imperial Grand Admiral who served as the Imperial Navy's head of starfighter research and development. He later becomes dissastified with Palpatine's rule as Emperor and attempts to overthrow him, but is stopped by Darth Vader and Grand Admiral Thrawn.
Jenna Zan Arbor
Megalomaniacal scientist who wanted to learn the secrets of the Force. To do this, she kidnapped and tortured Jedi, and later drained their bodies of their blood. During the Clone Wars she worked with the CIS.
Tyber Zann
Leader of the Zann Consortium, a criminal organization in the video game Empire At War: Forces of Corruption.
Darth Zannah
First featured in Darth Bane: Path of Destruction as a 10-year-old girl, in Darth Bane: Rule of Two she is apprenticed to Darth Bane, Finally in Darth Bane: Dynasty of Evil she takes the mantle of Dark Lord of the Sith from her Master.
Fang Zar — portrayed by Warren Owens
Senator who represented the Sern sector during the last years of the Galactic Republic. He was one of the senators on the Delegation of 2000. In Dark Lord: The Rise of Darth Vader, he went into hiding on the planet Alderaan, but was found and executed by Darth Vader.
Zekk
Jedi friend of Jacen and Jaina Solo, appearing in Young Jedi Knights, The New Jedi Order, Legacy of the Force and Fate of the Jedi series. He was discovered to be Force sensitive in the first series and was trained by the Shadow Academy as a Dark Jedi, but later joined the New Jedi Order. In Fate of the Jedi, he marries Taryn Zel, despite previously expressing romantic interest in Jaina.
Zorba the Hutt
Jabba the Hutt's father and baron of Cloud City after Lando Calrissian. First appears in Zorba the Hutt's Revenge.
Warlord Zsinj
An Imperial general who commands a splinter faction of the former Empire in The Courtship of Princess Leia.
Commodore Zuggs
An officer in the Imperial Starfleet and also later serves under Trioculus. First featured in The Lost City of the Jedi and later returns in Star Wars: Rebellion.

== See also ==
- List of Star Wars: Knights of the Old Republic characters
- List of Star Wars books
