= Star Wars: X-wing (book series) =

Book series

The cover of the series' first book

Star Wars: X-wing is a ten-book series of Star Wars novels by Michael A. Stackpole (who also co-wrote the similarly named comic book series) and Aaron Allston. Stackpole's contributions cover the adventures of a new Rogue Squadron formed by Wedge Antilles, while Allston's focus on Antilles' Wraith Squadron.

== Background ==
While preparing to write the series, Stackpole contacted Star Wars Expanded Universe author Timothy Zahn, whose Thrawn trilogy also features a group called Rogue Squadron. After the first book came out, Stackpole asked Zahn for permission to use his character Talon Karrde; Zahn changed about three words of dialogue. Later, Zahn asked Stackpole if he could use Booster Terrik in the first book of his Hand of Thrawn duology; Stackpole returned the favor of changing three words.

== Plot synopses ==
While the first eight books are largely continuous, the first four form one complete story arc (being continuous works by Stackpole about Rogue Squadron) while the next three form another complete arc (being continuous works of Allston detailing Wraith Squadron). Isard's Revenge mostly refers back to characters and situations created in Stackpole's first four novels. Starfighters of Adumar focuses on a few major characters (including several officers from Rogue Squadron. Namely: Antilles, Tycho Celchu, Wes Janson, and Hobbie Klivian).

The first seven novels take place 6.5–7.5 years after the events of the original Star Wars film. Isard's Revenge takes place about two years later, Starfighters of Adumar takes place 3–4 years after that, and Mercy Kill takes place three decades after that.

=== Rogue Squadron (1996) ===
Rogue Squadron (1996) is the first novel in the Star Wars: X-wing series. It is set at the beginning of the New Republic era of the Star Wars Expanded Universe and centers on the creation of a new Rogue Squadron by legendary Rebel Alliance pilot Wedge Antilles. As the first novel in the series, it introduces the primary character, Corran Horn, as well as a host of other characters, including Mirax Terrik, Erisi Dlarit, and Tycho Celchu. The novel focuses on the training and early development of the squadron, as well as the characters and their relationships (primarily Erisi's romantic interest in Corran, and Mirax and Corran's mutual romantic interest). The novel culminates in a daring attack on the Imperial stronghold of Borleias, the first step in an invasion of the capital world Coruscant.

=== Wedge's Gamble (1996) ===
Wedge's Gamble (1996) is the second novel in the series. It is set at the beginning of the New Republic era of the Star Wars Expanded Universe. Following the conquest of Borleias, the Rebels and Rogue Squadron must handle Imperial espionage ordered by the rogue imperial Warlord Zsinj. The apparent death of member Bror Jace, the subsequent recruiting by the squadron introduces new, hot-shot members, Aril Nunb and Pash Cracken. With worries of attacks by Zsinj's forces, the Provisional Council convenes and decides that the invasion of Coruscant (the capital of the Galactic Empire) must proceed. A decision is handed down that criminals from the Black Sun, a criminal organization, who have been imprisoned in the Spice Mines of Kessel, would be released on Coruscant as saboteurs and to weaken resistance against the coming invasion, the Rogues are first sent to Kessel. Rogue Squadron must use their undercover skills to help the Alliance to take Coruscant. The Squadron uses the orbital mirrors to reflect sunlight onto the reservoirs of Coruscant, creating massive thunderstorms that disable the planetary shields, and allowing the Alliance fleet a fighting chance at taking the planet, but at the cost of Corran's apparent death.

=== The Krytos Trap (1996) ===
The Krytos Trap (1996) is the third novel in the series. With the New Republic's successful conquest of Coruscant, the fledgling government must now deal with the difficulties of occupying and pacifying the former Imperial capital. The plot focuses on three key events. The first is the occupation of Coruscant and the trouble the Empire left behind with its crippling bio-attack on the planet. The virus used in the attack being the Krytos virus, ordered by Imperial leader Ysanne Isard and developed by General Evir Derricote. Humans are specifically immune, while all other species are vulnerable, creating racial tensions between humans and nonhumans. In addition, Krytos can only be cured with bacta, which the Empire has a monopoly over. This, combined with Imperial Intelligence officer Kirtan Loor's terrorist activities while taking orders from the Palpatine Counterinsurgency Front, leaves Coruscant and the New Republic in a state of emergency. Tycho Celchu is accused of murdering Corran and put on trial. Meanwhile, Corran finds himself as Isard's prisoner in the Lusankya facility along with the Rebel general and hero Jan Dodonna. Loor attempts to defect to the New Republic but is murdered before he can testify in Tycho's defense, but Corran manages to escape Lusankya and exonerate Tycho, exposing Erisi as the traitor instead. With Lusankya exposed, Isard reveals it is actually a Super Star Destroyer buried under Coruscant and uses it to escape the planet, wreaking untold havoc in its wake.

=== The Bacta War (1997) ===
The Bacta War (1997) is the fourth installment in the series. While the Alliance fleet mounts a major campaign against a deadly warlord, former director of imperial intelligence Isanne Isard has taken control of the planet Thyferra, the sole source of production of medicinal bacta. A crucial medicine at any time, this situation is made all the worse as Bacta is the only cure for the deadly Krytos virus Isard has released into the population of Coruscant. With the New Republic unwilling to go to war with Isard for fear of having their sole supply of bacta cut off, Rogue Squadron decides to go rogue, resigning from the New Republic and starting their own insurgency to break Isard's hold over Thyferra. Eventually, Rogue Squadron are able to gather enough allies that they are able to stage a full scale assault on the Lusankya, forcing it to surrender. Meanwhile, Corran is able to shoot down and kill both Erisi and Isard, ending their threat to the galaxy.

=== Wraith Squadron (1998) ===
Wraith Squadron (1998) is the fifth book in the series. After returning to Coruscant with Rogue Squadron following the Bacta War, Wedge Antilles decides to create a new starfighter unit which would take only pilots with commando-type skills. When pitching the idea to Admiral Ackbar, the Mon Calamari raises the issue of the cost to assemble such an elite unit. Antilles countered by saying he'd only take pilots who were on the verge of being discharged from Starfighter Command, reasoning that while many would be irredeemable, there would be a few pilots who had just made one mistake too many. Ackbar agrees on the condition if Wedge cannot make the squadron a success, he must accept a promotion to General. While having a rough start at first, Wraith Squadron eventually prove themselves by taking down the Imperial warlord Admiral Trigit.

=== Iron Fist (1998) ===
Iron Fist (1998) is the sixth novel in the series. It continues the exploits of Wraith Squadron begun by Allston in Wraith Squadron. Against all odds, the controversial Wraith Squadron has survived its first covert mission. But now they are called upon to cheat death twice. This time Wedge Antilles sends them in to stop the warlord Zsinj and his Super Star Destroyer, Iron Fist. If Zsinj joins the Empire, it could turn the tide of war against the Rebels. Wraith Squadron's mission: infiltrate the warlord's fleet and uncover his carefully guarded plans. To do so, they must pose as ruthless pirates seeking to join Zsinj's forces. And that means first becoming pirates in space lanes teeming with Imperial Navy patrols. They eventually manage to gain Zsinj's attention and perform several missions for them, all the while discovering that he steal the Imperial Remnant's brand now Super Star Destroyer Razor's Kiss to add to his fleet. Wraith Squadron successfully destroys the Razor's Kiss, foiling Zsinj's plans.

=== Solo Command (1999) ===
Solo Command (1999) is the seventh novel in the series, and the final book to detail the adventures of Wraith Squadron. Their covert mission has been a success. The enemy has been vanquished, or so they thought. The Super Star Destroyer Iron Fist somehow escaped destruction and with it the New Republic's greatest threat, the infamous warlord Zsinj. To defeat him, Wraith Squadron must join a combat task force led by the only man crafty enough to beat Zsinj at his own game: Han Solo. But Zsinj knows the X-wing pilots' indomitable courage is both their greatest strength—and their greatest weakness. Zsinj attempts to sow chaos and confusion among the New Republic ranks using brainwashed sleeper agents. Despite these setbacks, Han resorts to the unthinkable and allies himself with Admiral Rogriss from the Imperial Remnant to take down Zsinj together. Cornered by both forces, Zsinj enacts a daring ploy to fake the destruction of the Iron Fist, ensuring he escapes to fight another day while Han and the New Republic believe they have won.

=== Isard's Revenge (1999) ===
Isard's Revenge (1999) is the eighth novel in the series, with Stackpole returning as author. General Wedge Antilles has returned as commander of the New Republic X-wing unit Rogue Squadron. He is assigned the mission of taking down the Imperial warlord Admiral Krennel, who the New Republic wants to bring to justice. However, Isard appears to have survived her death at Corran Horn's hands and now assisting Krennel. Rogue Squadron is eventually caught in trap and nearly succumbs to overwhelming forces until they are saved by an unexpected ally: Isard herself. Isard explains that she is faked her death on Thyferra, and that the Isard working with Krennel is in fact a clone that was supposed to act as a body double for her. In return for providing Rogue Squadron with state of the art TIE Defenders and the location of Jan Dodonna and the other prisoners who were on the Lusankya, Isard tasks them with defeating Krennel and killing her clone. Rogue Squadron are able to successfully achieve their mission, and also correctly predict the whole operation was a distraction so that Isard could steal the newly repaired Lusankya. She is intercepted and killed by New Republic agent Iella Wessiri, ending her threat for good.

=== Starfighters of Adumar (1999) ===
Starfighters of Adumar (1999) is the ninth book in the series. It was written by Allston. The previously neutral world of Adumar has decided to pick a side in the war to control the galaxy. Delegates from both the New Republic and the Imperial Remnant have been invited to Adumar, and each camp will be given a chance to plead its government's case. But there is one small catch: since the Adumari prize military skill above all else, they insist that both delegations be composed exclusively of fighter pilots. For pilot Wedge Antilles and Red Flight, it's an unfamiliar exercise in diplomacy—and one that's filled with unexpected peril. Once they arrive, the X-wing pilots are challenged by Adumar's fierce warriors and attacked by Imperial assassins bent on eliminating all competition. However, despite impressing the Adumari with his prowess, Wedge openly criticizes the nation of Cartann's willingness to kill other pilots in ritual combat. New Republic diplomat Tomer Darpen betrays Red Flight and lies to Cartann's Perator that Wedge seeks death in honorable combat. Red Flight is barely able to escape Cartann and rally an alliance of Cartann's enemies to overthrow Cartann. The Perator steps down and his son negotiates a treaty to join the New Republic. Angered, the Imperial Remnant launches a full assault on Adumar, but are repelled by the combined New Republic and Adumari forces.

=== Mercy Kill (2012) ===
At Star Wars Celebration V in 2010 a tenth novel in the series, Mercy Kill, was announced. It was written by Allston and released on August 7, 2012. It takes place over three decades after the previous volume.

Voort SaBinring ('Piggy') is asked to reform Wraith Squadron years after their last mission to bring down a suspected traitor in the Galactic Alliance Military while facing the ghosts of Wraith's last operation..
