= Yavin 4 =

Fictional moon in Star Wars

- The gas giant planet Yavin and its fourth moon, as seen in Star Wars (1977)
- First appearance: Star Wars (1977)
- Last appearance: Andor: "Jedha, Kyber, Erso" (2025)
- Created by: George Lucas
- Genre: Science Fiction

In-universe information
- Type: Natural Satellite
- Location: The Outer Rim, in orbit around the gas giant Yavin
- Population: Human Massassi
- Battles: Battle of Yavin
- Atmosphere: Breathable
- Climate: Temperate
- Outstanding sites: Grand Temple massassi
- Affiliation: Rebel Alliance

Yavin 4 (or Yavin IV) is a natural satellite in the Star Wars fictional universe. Located in the Outer Rim, this moon orbits the gas giant Yavin.

It appears mainly in the films Rogue One and A New Hope, for which the exterior scenes are mostly shot on the Guatemalan site of Tikal. It also features prominently in the TV series Andor and in the animated Rebels TV series, video games and comic books. It is also mentioned in the novelizations of the films in which it appears, and in other novels.

== Context ==
The Star Wars universe is set in a galaxy that is the scene of clashes between the Jedi Knights and the Dark Lords of the Sith, characters who are sensitive to the Force, a mysterious energy field that gives them psychic powers. The Jedi master the Light Side of the Force, a beneficial and defensive power, to maintain peace in the galaxy. The Sith use the Dark Side, a harmful and destructive power, with the aim to dominate the galaxy.

== Geography ==
=== Spatial situation ===
The Yavin system is located in the Gordian Expanse sector of the Outer Rim. The star of this system is also called Yavin, as is the third and final planet from the centre. This planet, a gas giant, has 26 natural satellites. The fourth is Yavin 4.

=== Topography ===
The terrain of Yavin 4 is covered by forest, marshes and jungle. Pyramidal temples built by the Massassis (Note: The Massassi is an intelligent species that lives on Yavin 4.) stand within this environment. The largest of these, the Great Temple, became the main base of the Rebel Alliance.

This natural satellite is covered by oceans over a third of its surface. The remaining two-thirds are shared by four continents. On Yavin 4, there is no continental drift. The tectonic plates do not move in relation to each other. No ocean is isolated from the others. There are mountain ranges and volcanoes on this moon. These volcanoes are at the origin of a dynamic that allows the creation of very fast-flowing rivers.

=== Ways of life ===
The planet has a high level of bio-diversity. Massassis trees, with their purple bark, surrounded by climbing ferns, pomegranate mushrooms and bio-luminescent orchids, are an important part of the local flora. Among the tree-dwelling animals, the most notable are woolamanders, frugivores, and stindaril rodents, carnivores that feed on golden muralbirds in particular. Apparently the forests are inhabited by the alpine bird willow grouse, heard in the background in the Andor episode "Sagrona Teema". On land, there are runyips, herbivores, and swarms of piranha beetles. The marshes of this satellite are home to lizard crabs pursued by caparisoned eels. The waters are also home to aquatic gundarks, mucous salamanders, crystalline snakes and thyrsls. Finally, underground leviathan worms feed on the roots of massive trees.

== Official universe ==
=== Before the Battle of Yavin ===
Four years before the Battle of Yavin, Rebel pilot Cassian Andor lands on the planet in a stolen Imperial prototype, the TIE Avenger. He expects to deliver the ship to another Rebel pilot but is ambushed by a rogue band of squabbling guerillas, the Maya Pei Brigade. Over the course of two days, the brigade constantly bicker amongst themselves, leading to Cassian being able to break himself free in the squabble and escape in the TIE Avenger.

Years later, military leader Jan Dodonna founded a rebel cell on Yavin 4. He called it the Massassi Group, in reference to the intelligent species that inhabited the planet. This rebel group became one of the largest in the Galaxy, taking part in the battles of Scarif and Yavin. As a result, Yavin 4 is the main base of the Rebel Alliance.

Cassian would later live here with his partner Bix Caleen. He is sent to Ghorman to kill ISB agent Dedra Meero and ends up being a survivor of the Ghorman massacre. Once Cassian returns to the planet, Bix has left in an effort to make Cassian prioritize the Rebellion. Shortly afterwards, Phoenix Squadron arrive on the planet, joining the larger Rebellion which is now under the leadership of former-Imperial senators such as Mon Mothma and Bail Organa.

One year later, Cassian, and his new partner K-2SO, leave the planet to rescue Luthen Rael but end up returning with his accomplice Kleya Marki after learning of Luthen's death. Kleya tells Cassian about the Empire's construction of the superweapon known as the Death Star. Cassian is sent to find Galen Erso, the engineer behind the Death Star, but ends up finding his daughter Jyn Erso and bringing her back to the planet. Mon explains to Jyn that her father developed a planet-destroying battle station, the Death Star, and that she is best placed to find her father, Galen, and the plans for this Imperial superweapon that the Rebels want to destroy. Cassian, who is accompanying Jyn Erso, has been given a secret mission: to kill Galen.

They end up returning to the planet after Galen's death where the Rebel senators vote against stealing the Death Star plans from Scarif. Jyn and Cassian form a rogue group to go anyway. As the Battle of Scarif commenced, several Rebel leaders, including General Hera Syndulla, were called away from Yavin 4. The Tantive IV, with Princess Leia Organa, Bail's daughter, aboard, leaves Yavin 4 to witness the battle.

Captured by the Empire, Leia Organa refused to divulge the location of the Rebel base. To gain time, she gave the location of an abandoned site on the planet Dantooine. She then managed to escape aboard the Millennium Falcon with the smuggler Han Solo. The Death Star pursues the ship to the Yavin system. While the Imperial ships are on their way, General Dodonna prepares the defence of the Rebel Alliance.

=== Battle of Yavin ===
A Rebel sentry watches over the Rebel Base.

The Rebels launch several squadrons of fighters in the hope of taking advantage of a weakness in the Death Star's design to destroy it. The torpedo sent by a new recruit to the "Red" squadron, Luke Skywalker, destroyed the battle station, giving the Alliance a major victory over the Empire. Shortly after celebrating this victory with a ceremony, the Rebels abandoned Yavin 4, fearing a counter-attack.

=== After the Battle of Yavin ===
Once the Death Star is destroyed, two Rebels in particular are rewarded for their significant part in the battle. They were Luke Skywalker, who shot the rift that allowed the battle station to explode, and Han Solo, who saved it from the Sith Lord Darth Vader during the battle. Leia Organa presented them with a medal at Yavin 4, during a ceremony to celebrate this military victory.

After retiring, pilot Shara Bey and sergeant Kes Dameron, (Note: Parents of Poe Dameron.) two former rebels, settled on Yavin 4 to live. There they planted a fragment (Note: This type of fictitious tree simply grows back from a piece salvaged from another tree of the same species.) of a Force-sensitive tree given to them by Luke Skywalker.

== Legends Universe ==
The Massassi Temple ruins seen in Episode IV have featured in several Legends works.

Following the takeover of Lucasfilm by The Walt Disney Company, all elements narrated in derivative products dating prior to 26 April 2014 were declared to be outside of canon and were then grouped together as "Star Wars Legends".

=== Sith Wars ===
Around 5000 BBY, the Massassis species were living on Yavin 4 when the Sith Lord Naga Sadow fled Korriban after losing the Great Hyperspace War.

Naga Sadow left his mark on Yavin 4 with his temples. The Massassis built the Great Temple in homage to Naga Sadow, despite the persecution he suffered. Faced with his defeat at the hands of the Jedi, Naga Sadow partially resisted death by plunging into a century-long sleep on Yavin 4. Finally, a certain Freedon Nadd came in 4,400 BBY, found the temple and became Naga Sadow's apprentice.

Exar Kun later arrived at Yavin 4. There, he kills Naga Sadow once and for all, then enslaves the Massassis, having them build enormous temples, focal points of great power. He gradually gained strength by absorbing the energy of Massassi children in particular. At the same time, he carried out genetic experiments to create fighting animals. Unable to repel the Jedi's victory over him, he found a way to survive for several millennia by transferring his spirit to a temple in the natural satellite.

=== Fall and rebirth of the Republic ===
Much later, during the Clone Wars, the Jedi Anakin Skywalker confronts the separatist Asajj Ventress. Their duel takes place in the Great Massassian Temple. During the battle, Anakin seems to move particularly close to the Dark Side, in the run-up to his total overthrow in the final moments of the Clone Wars.

After the rise of the New Republic against the Galactic Empire, Luke Skywalker chose the moon as the place to found the New Jedi Order, and took Mara Jade with him. The planet was ravaged by the Yuuzhan Vong during the Vong invasion of the Galaxy. The Jedi Order moved to Ossus.

== Concept and creation ==
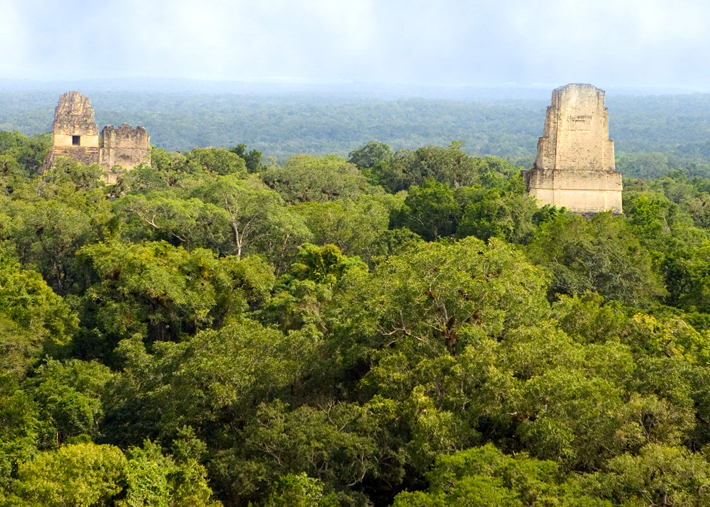
The Tikal pyramids in Guatemala

Scenes from A New Hope set on Yavin 4 were filmed near the ruins of the ancient Mayan city of Tikal, in Guatemala. Two years after filming, the site was listed as a UNESCO World Heritage Site. The idea of using these ruins as a film location came to George Lucas when, in England, he noticed the pre-Columbian site on a travel agency poster.

Yavin 4 and the Rebel base appeared again in Rogue One, the first film in the Star Wars Story spin-off series. Jyn Erso is captured by the Rebel Alliance 31. The appearance of Yavin 4 is one of the elements that link this episode to the first Star Wars. In this film, the introductory scene is similar to that of the first scene on Yavin 4, in A New Hope. A Rebel soldier standing sentry watches a fighter in the sky.

Scenes from Rogue One taking place on Yavin 4 were shot on a set approximately 107 metres (351 ft) long and 61 metres (200 ft) wide, rather than in a live environment. Others combine matte painting and live-action shooting. They were made at a Royal Air Force base in Bedfordshire, England.

Actor Oscar Isaac, who plays Poe Dameron in the third trilogy, was born in Guatemala, where Yavin 4 was filmed. He asked that the character he plays be from Yavin 4 so that he would feel closer to him. The satellite was therefore chosen as the birthplace of Poe Dameron in the Star Wars universe. This information was revealed even before the release of the film The Force Awakens, in which Poe appears for the first time.

== Adaptations ==
=== Video games ===
Yavin appears in Star Wars: Knights of the Old Republic as paid downloadable content for the Xbox release, while it is included in the game from the Windows release onward. The content takes place in an old space station orbiting the gas giant where the player character can purchase powerful and rare equipment salvaged from Yavin 4.

Yavin 4 appears in Star Wars: The Old Republic, released in 2011. The planet is home to Sith spirits such as Naga Sadow.

In 2017, Star Wars: Battlefront II has 11 different playable maps, including Yavin 4. It is the only one to appear in Rogue One alongside Scarif, and the only one, along with Mos Eisley, to come from A New Hope.

The gas giant Yavin also features in the 2020 Star Wars: Squadrons game. It is one of the locations in which the player can take part in a battle aboard a fighter.

=== Figurines ===
In 2012, Lego produced spherical figurines of a number of Star Wars planets, separable into two hemispheres. Although Yavin 4 is not a planet but a satellite, it is also part of the collection under number 9677 "X-wing Starfighter & Yavin 4 ". It is sold with an X-Wing and its pilot.

In addition, figurines of the characters in their Yavin appearance were put on sale. From 1 November 2021, Funko marketed the Pop figure under number 459 "Princess Leia (Yavin Ceremony)" Note 5. It depicts Leia Organa holding a medal, which in the film she gives to Luke Skywalker or Han Solo. A few months later, in the spring of 2022, Hasbro released a similar figure in its Black Series for Lucasfilm's 50th anniversary under the name "Princess Leia Organa (Yavin 4)". This is Leia in ceremonial dress with the film's medal.

== Popularity ==
Yavin 4 regularly appears in the Star Wars saga star charts, and has proven a popular location among fans. In its ranking, Vulture put it as their tenth favorite planet in the franchise. It explains that this natural satellite has two main qualities: its history linked to the Sith and its appearance due to the temples used as starship hangars by the rebels. The Comic Book Resources website ranked Yavin 4 fourth, behind Naboo, Bespin and the forest moon of Endor. It emphasises its perfect topography but points out that it lacks natural mineral resources.

In its ranking of the best locations in A New Hope, the Screen Rant website puts Yavin 4 in tenth place, ahead of five locations on Tatooine, two on the Death Star and two starships. Among the qualities of the natural satellite, the site mainly mentions the medal ceremony room and the outward appearance of the Rebel base. However, it points out that the film does not dwell much on this important location.

The duel between Asajj Ventress and Anakin Skywalker on Yavin 4 in particular is one of the most popular moments in the Clone Wars animated series, mainly for the visual effect.

== Analysis ==
=== Literary analysis ===
The choice of Yavin 4, a jungle world, as the base for the rebels, the heroes of A New Hope, can be explained by the fact that the worlds in the saga that are home to the characters from the side of good are wild, natural and verdant, such as the saga's other notable satellite, the forest moon of Endor, and the planets Naboo and Kashyyyk. The characters in the evil camp live in an artificial base, the Death Star, as opposed to the verdant Yavin 4. The lush jungle of this planet contrasts with the artificial, black and white habitat of evil.

=== Scientific analysis ===
Like several other Star Wars stars, Yavin 4 has been studied using a scientific approach to determine whether the concept seems realistic enough. First of all, the gas giant of the natural satellite in question would have to be well placed in its system, within the system's habitability zone. The diversity of ecosystems on Yavin 4 also seems more likely than a natural satellite covered entirely in forest like the forest moon of Endor, if only because the polar regions are colder than the tropical regions.

== Posterity ==
The planet D'Qar in the third trilogy of the saga is sometimes seen as a replay of Yavin 4: these planets are covered in jungle and uninhabited due to their isolation from hyperspace routes. In addition, the Resistance, heir to the Rebel Alliance, set up its command base there.

A scene set on Yavin 4 in particular continues to leave its mark on fans of the saga and the specialist press several decades after its presence in A New Hope: The Last, with the medal ceremony. Indeed, of the three heroes of the battle present at the time, only two were awarded medals, Han Solo and Luke Skywalker. Fans are looking for several explanations as to why Chewbacca doesn't get a medal. Firstly, some fans believe that this means that the Rebel Alliance considers humans, including Han and Luke, to be superior to other species. Some fans speculate that since Chewbacca has been secretly working for the Rebels since Revenge of the Sith, there is no need to give him a medal. Others, from outside the saga universe, think that the film crew simply forgot.

However, George Lucas claims that for the Wookiees, Chewbacca's species, a medal is not of symbolic importance and that Chewbacca has already been honoured by a Wookiee ceremony, after the Battle of Yavin.

Peter Mayhew, Chewbacca's actor, offers a more pragmatic explanation. According to him, the production of A New Hope lacked the money to make this first film and had to make savings on certain elements. For example, buying a third medal for the shoot would have been too expensive.

Finally, Chewbacca receives a medal, in the episode The Rise of Skywalker, from the hands of Maz Kanata.

== Appendices ==
=== Bibliography ===
Print material

- Beecroft, Simon (2012). "Star wars": les héros de la saga. Paris: Nathan. ISBN 978-2-09-253865-4.
- Lucasfilm Magazine (1999). hors-série N° 01 : Star Wars Episode I : Le guide officiel du film La Menace fantôme. Paris, Courleciel.
- Wallace, Daniel; Fry, Jason; Fullwood, Ian (2009). Star wars: the essential atlas. New York: Del Rey/Ballantine Books. ISBN 978-0-345-47764-4.
- Wallace, Daniel; Fry, Jason (2016). Star Wars: L'Atlas. Huginn & Muninn.
- Webster, David L. (2002). The fall of the ancient Maya: solving the mystery of the Maya collapse. London; New York: Thames & Hudson. ISBN 978-0-500-05113-9. OCLC 48753878.
- Windham, Ryder; Wallace, Daniel (2015). Ultimate "Star wars". Vanves: Hachette heroes. ISBN 978-2-01-220631-1.
- Windham, Ryder; Wallace, Dan (2012). Star wars: l'encyclopédie absolue (Nouvelle éd. enrichie ed.). Paris: Nathan. ISBN 978-2-09-254065-7.

News

- Lamy, Corentin; Reynaud, Florian (2020-10-09). "On a testé : " Star Wars : Squadrons ", un simulateur de bataille spatiale qui manque de carburant". Le Monde.fr (in French).
- Wenz, John (April 23, 2015). "Could the Planets in Star Wars Actually Support Life?". Wired. ISSN 1059-1028.
- "Star Wars: Oscar Isaac croit que son personnage vient de Yavin 4". La Presse (in Canadian French). 2015-05-07.

Web content

- Acuna, Kirsten (December 21, 2016). "20 'Star Wars' references you may have missed in 'Rogue One'". Business Insider.
- Alamone, Nicholas (December 16, 2015). "Star Wars: les lieux de tournage de la saga à visiter". L'Express (in French). Archived from the original on February 6, 2016.
- Bacon, Thomas (2019-01-19). "George Lucas Explained Why Chewbacca Didn't Get A Medal In 1977". ScreenRant.
- Cross, Ethan (2021-06-27). "Star Wars: 10 Best Planets To Live In". CBR.
- Cusseau, Clément (2021-04-05). "Rogue One : 11 clins d'oeil à ne pas manquer dans le spin-off Star Wars". AlloCiné (in French).
- Cuyer, Clément (2021). "Rogue One sur TF1 : ces deux célèbres personnages de Star Wars qu'il ne faudra pas louper devant le film". AlloCiné (in French).
- de Lange, Sander (September 19, 2014). "Galactic Backpacking, part 3: Visiting Real-World Yavin 4". StarWars.com. Archived from the original on December 7, 2014.
- De Lavaissiere, Vincent (2017). "Star Wars Battlefront 2 : les planètes et lieux disponibles au lancement". IGN France (in French).
- Doussot, Michel (2019-12-18). "Star Wars, les lieux de tournage de la saga". Routard.com.
- Draven, Derek (2021-12-20). "Star Wars: 9 Things About General Jan Dodonna That Only Diehard Fans Know". ScreenRant.
- Edwards, Gareth (2016). "Ciné-club : Rogue One : a star wars story". www.cineclubdecaen.com.
- Egan, James (2022-08-23). "10 Times Star Wars Gave Fans What Wanted (and They Hated It)". WhatCulture.com.
- Egan, Toussaint (2021-04-02). "General Grievous was actually cool in Tartakovsky's Clone Wars". Polygon.
- Fallon, Sean (September 13, 2021). "Star Wars Princess Leia Yavin Ceremony Funko Pop Exclusive Is up for Pre-Order". Star Wars.
- Hamon-beugin, Valentin (2019-12-13). "Star Wars: 11 destinations touristiques sur les traces des Jedi". Le Figaro (in French).
- Hawkins, Blake (2021-08-30). "Star Wars: Every Sith Lord in Modern Canon". CBR.
- Hollyhock (2016-12-20). "Rogue One : les caméos et clins d'oeil à la saga originale". hitek.fr.
- Hontebeyrie, Isabelle. "Star Wars: Il était une fois la rébellion..." Le Journal de Montréal.
- Imbert, Thomas (2019-12-23). "Star Wars 9 : comment interpréter cette scène avec Chewbacca dans L'Ascension de Skywalker ? [SPOILERS]". AlloCiné (in French).
- Imbert, Thomas (2021). "Star Wars : George Lucas explique la signification des couleurs dans la saga". AlloCiné (in French).
- James, David (2021-09-06). "Star Wars: Clone Wars Voice Actor Wants To Bring Back Asajj Ventress". We Got This Covered.
- Jones, Nate (2017-12-21). "Star Wars Planets, Ranked". Vulture.
- Kluz, Arron (2021-12-10). "The Entire Knights Of The Old Republic Timeline Explained". SVG.
- Knight, Rosie (July 19, 2017). "How "Force Trees" Might Affect THE LAST JEDI's Plot — Nerdist". archive.nerdist.com.
- Libbey, Dirk (2015-11-02). "Why Chewbacca Didn't Get A Medal At The End Of Star Wars: A New Hope". Cinemablend.
- Man, Paper (2019a). "10 persos de l'univers étendu de Star Wars que tout fan doit connaitre !". Top Comics (in French).
- Man, Paper (2019b). "10 persos de l'univers étendu de Star Wars que tout fan doit connaitre !". Top Comics (in French).
- McGinley, Rhys (2021-12-28). "Star Wars: 10 Best Locations In A New Hope, Ranked". ScreenRant.
- Newbold, Mark (2021-09-08). "WORLD EXCLUSIVE: Hasbro The Black Series Power of the Force Princess Leia". Fantha Tracks | Daily Star Wars News.
- Newbold, Mark (2021-09-12). "Funko Pop! Star Wars: Across The Galaxy - Princess Leia (Yavin Ceremony), Amazon Exclusive". Fantha Tracks | Daily Star Wars News.
- Orange, B. Alan (2019-01-21). "The Real Reason Chewbacca Never Got a Medal in Star Wars According to George Lucas". MovieWeb.
- Pierre (2016-12-15). "[SPOIL] Les easters eggs et les liens scénaristiques de Rogue One avec le reste de la saga". Journal du Geek (in French).
- Prahl, Amanda (2019-12-22). "Where You've Seen Maz Kanata's Gift to Chewbacca Before". Popsugar.
- Roberts, Tyler (2021-11-01). "Star Wars Princess Leia Power of the Force Figure Arrives from Hasbro". bleedingcool.com.
- Shana-Inika (2015-01-15). "SWTOR - 3.0 : Des fantômes sur Yavin (succès cachés)". Game-Guide (in French).
- Squires, Bethy (2021-08-14). "The Ending Of Star Wars: A New Hope Explained". Looper.
- starseb (2021-09-09). "La figurine Hasbro Black Series de Leia en tenue de cérémonie - les actus sur la saga". Planete-StarWars.com (in French).
- Thapa, Shaurya (2021-09-04). "Star Wars: 9 Things You Didn't Know About Yavin 4". ScreenRant.
- Valverde, Michael (2015). "Star Wars: The Force Awakens – Yavin 4". Dork Side of the Force.
- Vaux, Robert (2021-04-10). "Star Wars: The Best Moments From Genndy Tartakovsky's Clone Wars". CBR.
- Whitmore, Parker (2022-03-18). "Why didn't Chewbacca get his medal in 'Star Wars'?". We Got This Covered.
- "Rogue One : A Star Wars Story - Présentation du film". TF1 Pro. November 26, 2019. Archived from the original on September 25, 2021.
- "The Legendary Star Wars Expanded Universe Turns a New Page". StarWars.com. April 25, 2014.
- "Star Wars : Rogue One face à la trilogie originale". IGN France (in French). 2016-04-11.
- "Building instructions for 9677, X-wing Starfighter™ & Yavin 4™, LEGO Star Wars". www.lego.com. 2012.

== See also ==
- Star Wars
- List of Star Wars planets and moons
