= C-3PO =

Robot character from Star Wars

- Star Wars character
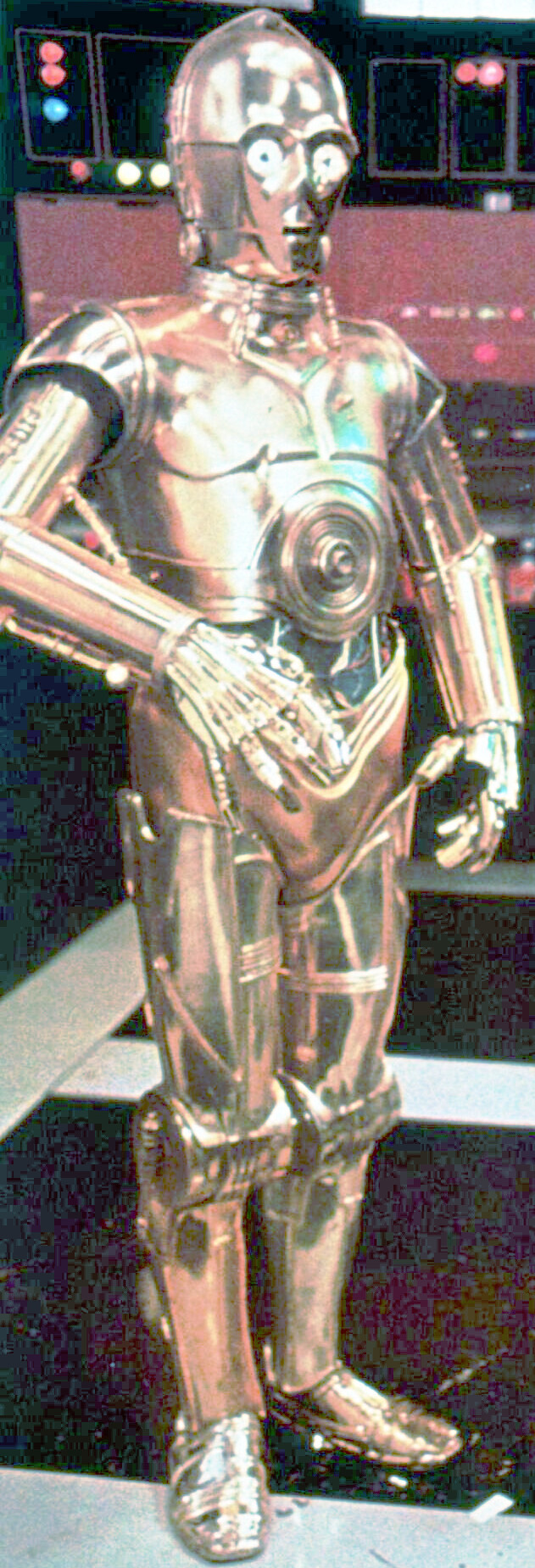
- Anthony Daniels as C-3PO as seen in Star Wars (1977).
- First appearance: Star Wars: From the Adventures of Luke Skywalker (1976 novel)
- Created by: George Lucas
- Portrayed by: Anthony Daniels
- Voiced by: Anthony Daniels; Tom Kane; Tony Pope; Simon Pegg
- Performed by: Michael Lynch

In-universe information
- Class: Protocol droid
- Affiliation: Galactic Republic; Rebel Alliance; New Republic; Resistance
- Creator: Anakin Skywalker
- Homeworld: Tatooine

C-3PO (/ˌsiːˈθriːpioʊ/) or See-Threepio is a humanoid robot character in the Star Wars franchise. He is a protocol droid designed to assist in etiquette and translation, and is fluent in over six million forms of communication. He first appeared in the 1976 novelization of the original Star Wars film (1977), (Note: The film was originally titled Star Wars, then was later retitled Star Wars: Episode IV—A New Hope.) and he appears in all nine films of the Skywalker Saga, which includes the original trilogy, the prequel trilogy and the sequel trilogy. Anthony Daniels portrays C-3PO in all the Skywalker Saga films and the standalone film Rogue One, and he voices the droid in the animated series The Clone Wars. In addition to films, C-3PO appears in television series, novels, comics, and video games.

== Creation and portrayal ==
Ralph McQuarrie, a concept artist for Star Wars, based the initial design for C-3PO on the female robot from the Fritz Lang film Metropolis (1927). (Note: Attributed to multiple references:) When Anthony Daniels saw one of McQuarrie's paintings of C-3PO, he was struck by the vulnerability in the droid's face, and he wanted the role. (Note: Attributed to multiple references:) George Lucas, who created the Star Wars franchise and directed Star Wars, selected Daniels for the physical performance. He was planning to hire another actor for the droid's voice, because he was hesitant to give the character Daniels's British accent. According to Daniels, Lucas wanted C-3PO to have a "sleazy New York second-hand car dealer" type of voice. Daniels recalled that thirty well-established actors auditioned for the voice role—including Richard Dreyfuss and Mel Blanc—but Daniels ultimately received the part after one of the actors suggested the idea to Lucas. (Note: Attributed to multiple references:) With Daniels voicing him, C-3PO's persona transformed from oily used-car salesman to neurotic English butler. (Note: Attributed to multiple references:) In a 1977 interview with Rolling Stone, Lucas called droids the "comic aspect" of the original Star Wars film, and that C-3PO and R2-D2 were designed to resemble the comedy duo Laurel and Hardy.

Filming Star Wars proved challenging for Daniels. In his memoir I Am C-3PO: The Inside Story, he describes the first C-3PO costume as claustrophobic and painful. It barely moved, cracked easily, and had no ventilation. Daniels overheated, scraped himself up, and could hardly see where he was going. The costume took two hours to put on, and the head took thirty minutes to remove. (Note: Attributed to multiple references:) Although Star Wars was immensely successful, Daniels was initially hesitant to return for the second film, The Empire Strikes Back (1980). According to Daniels, the publicists for Star Wars wanted to give the impression that C-3PO was portrayed by a real robot, and not an actor in a costume. Daniels felt his acting was undervalued, but he eventually agreed to return for a higher salary.

Lucas wanted to create audience sympathy for C-3PO in The Empire Strikes Back by having him get dismantled. He considered having the villain Darth Vader destroy the droid's heart, or turn it into a mundane object, such as an alarm clock. In the finished film, C-3PO is blasted into pieces by an offscreen foe, then rescued from a scrap pile by Chewbacca. (Note: The Complete Star Wars Encyclopedia reveals that the droid's assailant is an Imperial stormtrooper.) Because both C-3PO and Chewbacca were likeable characters—and disliked one another—Lucas wanted them to have a bonding experience. Towards this end, Chewbacca carries and then repairs the dismantled droid.

In his memoirs, Daniels has expressed confidence that C-3PO is loved enough by fans that he could continue to appear even if not portrayed by Daniels.

== Appearances ==
=== Overview ===
Anthony Daniels plays C-3PO in ten live-action films, as well as the 2008 animated film Star Wars: The Clone Wars. Daniels both physically portrays the character and provides the voice in all of these films except for The Phantom Menace. For that film, a C-3PO puppet was operated by Michael Lynch, with Daniels providing the voice.

Daniels portrays C-3PO in the television series Obi-Wan Kenobi and Ahsoka, and voices the droid in the animated film The Clone Wars. (Note: Attributed to multiple references:) He also voices the character in the Star Wars Holiday Special, the radio drama adaptations of the original trilogy, various Lego Star Wars series and specials, and the series Droids, Clone Wars, The Clone Wars, Forces of Destiny, Star Wars Rebels and Star Wars Resistance. In video games, C-3PO is voiced by Daniels, Tom Kane and Tony Pope. (Note: Attributed to multiple references:) Simon Pegg voices the character in a Star Wars-themed episode of the animated television series Phineas and Ferb.

=== Original trilogy ===
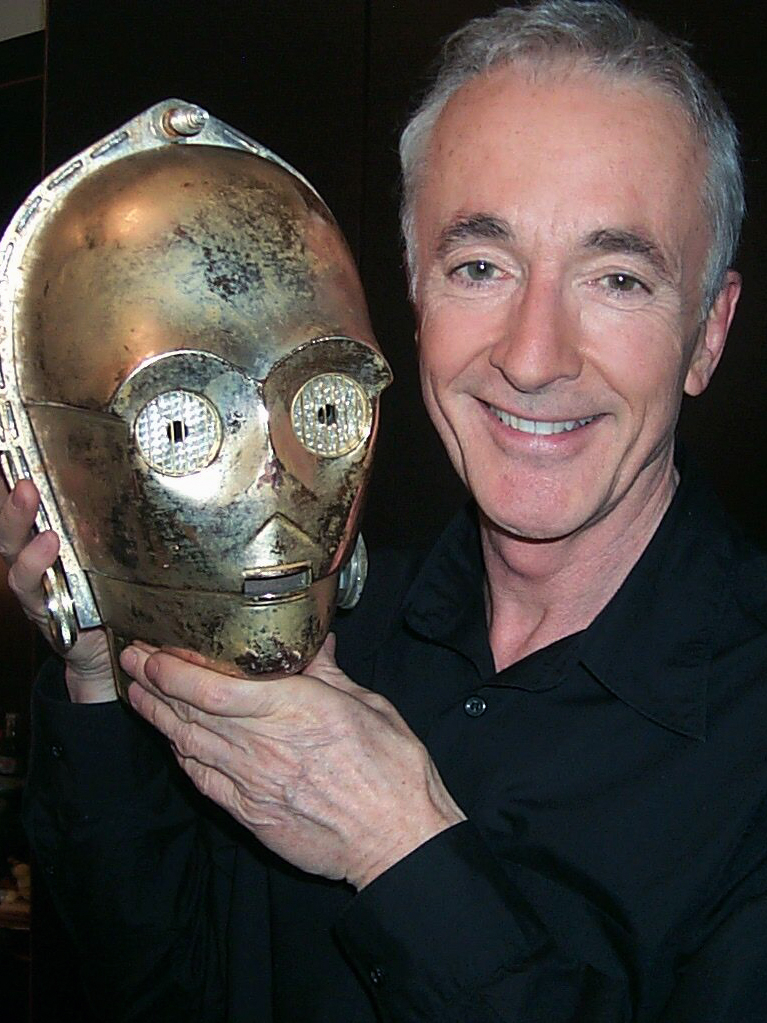
Anthony Daniels has played C-3PO since 1977.

C-3PO first appears in Star Wars (1977) aboard a Rebel ship that is boarded by the Empire. Princess Leia hides C-3PO and his companion droid R2-D2 in an escape pod, which she jettisons over the planet Tatooine. There, the droids are captured by Jawas, who sell them to Owen Lars. While cleaning R2-D2, Lars's nephew Luke Skywalker discovers a message in the droid that Leia recorded for Obi-Wan Kenobi. After Imperial stormtroopers destroy the Lars homestead, C-3PO and R2-D2 go along with Luke and Obi-Wan on a mission to rescue Leia, transported by the smugglers Han Solo and Chewbacca on board the Millennium Falcon. While on the Death Star, C-3PO and R2-D2 shut down the space station's trash compactor to save the lives of their companions. The group then escapes the station and joins the Rebels at their base. When R2-D2 is damaged during the Battle of Yavin, a grief-stricken C-3PO offers to donate his own parts to repair his counterpart.

In The Empire Strikes Back (1980), C-3PO identifies an Imperial probe droid, which gives the Rebels advance warning of an Imperial attack on their base on Hoth. C-3PO escapes the planet with Han, Chewbacca and Leia on the Millennium Falcon. They eventually arrive in Cloud City, where C-3PO is blasted apart by a stormtrooper. After searching for the protocol droid, Chewbacca finds him dismantled on a conveyor belt. The Wookiee later tries to rebuild C-3PO, but puts his head on backwards. Chewbacca carries the partially-rebuilt droid on his back during Han's encasement in carbonite. With the help of Lando Calrissian, C-3PO and his friends escape from Darth Vader. On board the Falcon, R2-D2 successfully repairs C-3PO.

At the beginning of Return of the Jedi (1983), Luke sends C-3PO and R2-D2 to the palace of the crime lord Jabba the Hutt, who has purchased the frozen Han from the bounty hunter Boba Fett. To C-3PO's dismay, R2-D2 plays a recorded message in which Luke offers the droids as a goodwill gift to Jabba. Now in the service of the crime lord, C-3PO acts as a translator as Leia, Chewbacca, Lando and Luke arrive at the palace to liberate Han. Jabba foils the plan, but Luke leads a successful escape attempt and the group departs the planet. On Endor, C-3PO and his companions are captured by Ewoks, but are released after they perceive C-3PO to be a deity. Later that night, C-3PO narrates the history of the Rebellion's fight against the Empire to the Ewok tribe, which convinces them to help the Rebels. After the second Death Star is destroyed, C-3PO and his friends celebrate the fall of the Empire.

=== Prequel trilogy ===
C-3PO returns in The Phantom Menace (1999), the first film of the prequel trilogy. The film reveals that C-3PO was built on Tatooine by the nine-year-old slave boy Anakin Skywalker. The protocol droid meets his future companion, R2-D2, along with Jedi Master Qui-Gon Jinn, Queen Padmé Amidala of Naboo and the Gungan Jar Jar Binks. C-3PO and R2-D2 help improve Anakin's podracer for the Boonta Eve Classic race, and C-3PO becomes part of Anakin's pit crew. C-3PO and Anakin part ways when Qui-Gon frees the boy from slavery and takes him off-planet. Before leaving, Anakin assures the droid that his mother Shmi will not sell him.

Attack of the Clones (2002) is set ten years after The Phantom Menace. Shmi is kidnapped by a group of Tusken Raiders. Sensing that his mother is in danger, Anakin travels with Padmé to Tatooine, where they reunite with C-3PO. He presents Anakin and Padmé to Anakin's stepfamily: Owen Lars, Cliegg Lars and Beru Whitesun. When Anakin returns with his mother's body, C-3PO attends her funeral. When Anakin and Padmé depart Tatooine, C-3PO accompanies them to the planet Geonosis to rescue Obi-Wan from the Sith Lord Count Dooku. Shortly afterward, he follows R2-D2 into a droid-construction factory, where his head is exchanged with that of a battle droid. Influenced by the battle droid's programming, C-3PO reluctantly participates in the film's climactic battle scene. After being restored by R2-D2, he leaves Geonosis with his companions. At the end of the film, he is a witness to Padmé and Anakin's marriage on Naboo.

In Revenge of the Sith (2005), C-3PO is aware of Padmé's pregnancy. After Anakin falls to the dark side of the Force and becomes the Sith Lord Darth Vader, he takes C-3PO and R2-D2 with him as he massacres the Jedi. C-3PO rationalizes Vader's behavior by saying he has been under a great deal of stress. The protocol droid accompanies Padmé to Mustafar, where he witnesses Vader strangle her into unconsciousness. C-3PO and R2-D2 then take her to safety. When Obi-Wan returns to their spaceship following his duel with Vader, C-3PO pilots it to Polis Massa and witnesses Padmé give birth to the Skywalker twins, Luke and Leia. C-3PO and R2-D2 become the property of Captain Raymus Antilles, who orders C-3PO's memory erased to protect the Skywalker children from their father and the newly created Galactic Empire.

=== Sequel trilogy ===
C-3PO appears in The Force Awakens (2015), the first installment of the sequel trilogy. He has a red left arm at one point, and is now fluent in seven million forms of communication. He is first seen with Leia and a Resistance team picking up Han, Chewbacca, Finn, Rey, and BB-8 on the planet Takodana. During their adventures, C-3PO is reunited with R2-D2, who is reactivated after being shut off for years. In The Last Jedi (2017), C-3PO serves as an assistant to Leia and the Resistance pilot Poe Dameron. Daniels complained that his character was a "table decoration" in this film, and that C-3PO is "worth more than that".

In The Rise of Skywalker (2019), the droid and his companions travel to Passana, where they search for a clue to the location of a Sith wayfinder. With the help of Lando, they locate the clue—a dagger with inscriptions in the Sith language. C-3PO is able to translate the runes, but his programming prevents him from sharing the translation with his friends. The group travels to Kijimi, where a black-market droid-smith extracts the message from C-3PO, erasing his memory in the process. When C-3PO returns to the Resistance camp, R2-D2 is able to restore his memory.

=== Series ===
C-3PO appears in the live action series Obi-Wan Kenobi (2022) and Ahsoka (2023), and the animated series Clone Wars (2003), The Clone Wars (2008–2020), Forces of Destiny (2017–2018) Star Wars Rebels (2014–2018) and Star Wars Resistance (2018–2020). He is also featured in the 2008 animated film The Clone Wars, which serves as a pilot for the series The Clone Wars.

=== Other ===
In the standalone film Rogue One (2016), C-3PO makes a cameo appearance alongside R2-D2. C-3PO appears in the comics Star Wars (2015–present), Shattered Empire (2015), Star Wars: C-3PO (2016) and Star Wars: Poe Dameron (2016–2018), as well as the novel Bloodline (2016). He also appears in the radio adaptations of the original film trilogy (1981, 1983, and 1996).

== Star Wars Legends ==
Following the acquisition of Lucasfilm by The Walt Disney Company in 2012, most of the licensed Star Wars novels and comics produced between 1977 and 2014 were rebranded as Star Wars Legends and declared non-canon to the franchise. The Legends works comprise a separate narrative universe. (Note: Attributed to multiple references:)

=== Novels ===
In The Truce at Bakura (1994), C-3PO translates Ssi-ruuvi, the language of the Ssi-ruuk, to aid the Alliance. C-3PO and R2-D2 are members of the Senate Planetary Intelligence Network (SPIN) in The Glove of Darth Vader (1992), and are disguised as Kessel droids so they can infiltrate a gathering of Imperials. In The Courtship of Princess Leia (1994), C-3PO is led to believe that Han is ancestrally the King of Corellia during Han's competition with Prince Isolder for Leia's hand in marriage. C-3PO agrees to assist Han as a counselor droid, but is shocked when Han kidnaps Leia and takes her to Dathomir. He later discovers that Han's ancestor was merely a pretender to the throne. Following Han and Leia's marriage, C-3PO travels with them to Tatooine in Tatooine Ghost (2003). He helps them search for an Alderaanian moss painting storing a valuable code. He also reunites with Kitster Banai and Wald, childhood friends of Anakin Skywalker. With their help, C-3PO discovers Shmi Skywalker's diary.

In Heir to the Empire (1991), Lando reprograms C-3PO to sound like Leia in order to hide from Imperials on Nkllon. The Empire, led by Grand Admiral Thrawn, sees through the deception. In Dark Force Rising (1992), C-3PO goes to Honoghr with Leia during the Thrawn Crisis to discover what caused the plight of the Noghri. He is forced to hide with Leia and Chewbacca when Imperial forces arrive, but later returns to Coruscant, where Leia gives birth to Jaina and Jacen Solo. He cares for the twins, and later Anakin Solo as well. C-3PO accompanies Han, Lando, R2-D2, Luke, Chewbacca, and Mara Jade to Wayland in The Last Command (1993). The party recruits aid from the local population and destroys the Mount Tantiss storehouse.

In Dark Apprentice (1994), the Solo twins elude Chewbacca and C-3PO during a trip to a Coruscant zoo, and arrive in the planet's sub-levels. C-3PO frantically searches for them, but they are found by King Onibald Daykim and reunited with their parents. C-3PO and R2-D2 accompany Leia on a diplomatic mission to Nam Chorios in Planet of Twilight (1997). They are unable to prevent her kidnapping and fail to stop the Death Seed plague unleashed by Seti Ashgad and Dzym. Eventually rescued by Han and Lando, the two droids convey their message for help. In The Crystal Star (1994), C-3PO accompanies Luke and Han to Crseih Station to investigate the possible existence of Jedi trainees, but instead find Waru, a creature from another dimension. They learn of Waru's alliance with Lord Hethrir and of the kidnapping of the Solo children. Hethrir is destroyed following a confrontation with Leia, Han, and Luke.

In The Black Fleet Crisis trilogy, C-3PO accompanies Lando, R2-D2, and Lando's associate Lobot to investigate the runaway alien ship Teljkon Vagabond. They eventually discover that the ship contains the last vestiges of the Quella civilization. In The New Rebellion (1997), C-3PO and several companions are instrumental in stopping Kueller from regaining power by disabling explosive devices he had placed in a large number of droids. During the outbreak of the First Corellian Insurrection in Ambush at Corellia (1995), C-3PO and Chewbacca retrieve Jaina, Jacen, and Anakin from the burning Corona House. In Showdown at Centerpoint (1995), the protocol droid accompanies Luke, Lando, Gaeriel Captison and Belindi Kalenda to Centerpoint Station. He informs them that the temperature inside Hollowtown has increased to dangerously high levels. He serves as a translator for Talon Karrde's expedition to the Kathol Sector in Vision of the Future (1998).

=== Comics ===
According to the Star Wars comic strip, C-3PO was activated on the planet Affa hundreds of years before the events of the original Star Wars film. A Guide to the Star Wars Universe states his activation date as 112 years before Star Wars. In the Star Wars Tales story "Thank the Maker", Vader remembers finding the defunct droid in Watto's junk heap and guessing it was several decades old. In the Star Wars: Republic story "The New Face of War", Queen Jamillia appoints C-3PO to serve as a liaison to the Jedi. In 1994, Dark Horse Comics serialized a story titled Droids, which led to a 14-issue comic series continuing the adventures of C-3PO and R2-D2 before the events of Star Wars. Lucasfilm did not require this series to align narratively with the animated series Droids. Anthony Daniels and Ryder Windham also co-wrote a 1997 one-shot comic titled The Protocol Offensive.

In Empire's End (1997), C-3PO and R2-D2 are nearly destroyed after they spot an Imperial installing a homing beacon on the Millennium Falcon, but are saved by Han and Chewbacca. The resurrected Palpatine and his fleet discover the Alliance's existence, leading C-3PO and the others to flee to Iziz, a city on the planet of Onderon. Palpatine eventually finds them, but is mortally wounded by Han and destroyed when Empatojayos Brand sacrifices himself to save Anakin Solo. C-3PO is found partially destroyed and abandoned by two slave boys, Otalp and Remoh, in the Star Wars Tales story Storyteller, which takes place after the original film trilogy. The droid tells them stories of Luke's adventures, and they imagine the stories played out by members of their own alien race. As he is finishing his tale, a Vindar slavedriver appears, blasts C-3PO's head off, and kills Otalp. Later, Remoh finds hope for his people's freedom when he discovers a lightsaber in the remains of C-3PO's body.

=== Animated series ===
In addition to novels and comics, some animated series are part of Star Wars Legends. In Droids (1985), which takes place between Revenge of the Sith and Star Wars, C-3PO and R2-D2 are traded among various masters. In Clone Wars (2003), C-3PO's outer plating is upgraded during his tenure as Padmé's servant. He is a reluctant participant in many of her adventures, including a hazardous mission during the Battle of Ilum. On this mission, he helps Yoda rescue the Jedi Master Luminara Unduli and the Padawan Barriss Offee.

== Other appearances ==
Outside of the official canon and the Legends universe, C-3PO appears in the Star Wars Holiday Special (1978), The Muppet Show (1980), Sesame Street (1980), an unreleased mockumentary, Return of the Ewok (1982), Donald Duck's 50th Birthday (1984), The Lego Movie (2014), Lego Star Wars: Droid Tales (2015), Lego Star Wars: The Resistance Rises (2016), The Lego Star Wars Holiday Special (2020), Lego Star Wars Summer Vacation (2022), the animated short How NOT to Draw R2-D2 (2024), Lego Star Wars: Rebuild the Galaxy (2024-2025) and various video games. The character also appears in a 2014 Star Wars-themed episode of the animated television series Phineas and Ferb.

== Analysis ==
The cultural critic Jonathan McIntosh has described both C-3PO and R2-D2 as "emotionally relatable underdogs" with whom viewers can empathize. He asserts that the two droids were based on two bickering peasants from Akira Kurosawa’s 1958 film The Hidden Fortress. He states that, like the peasants, the droids are both humorous and tragic, being members of an oppressed underclass of exploited laborers.
