= Princess Leia =

Star Wars character

- Star Wars character
- Carrie Fisher as Princess Leia (Note: Promotional image for Star Wars (1977))
- First appearance: Star Wars: From the Adventures of Luke Skywalker (1976)
- Created by: George Lucas
- Portrayed by: Carrie Fisher (Note: Original trilogy Sequel trilogy Star Wars Holiday Special); Vivien Lyra Blair (Note: Obi-Wan Kenobi); Aidan Barton (Note: Revenge of the Sith (infant))
- Voiced by: Various: Carrie Fisher (Note: Star Wars Holiday Special; Lego Star Wars: The Force Awakens; Rogue One (archival audio); Rebels (archival audio)); Grey DeLisle (Note: Star Wars: Force Commander); Heather Doerksen (Note: Lego Star Wars: The Yoda Chronicles, Lego Star Wars: Droid Tales); Julie Dolan (Note: Star Wars: Uprising, Rebels, Lego Star Wars: The Freemaker Adventures, Disney Infinity 3.0); Lisa Fuson (Note: Shadows of the Empire Masters of Teräs Käsi Star Wars: Rebellion Galactic Battlegrounds Lego Star Wars: The Empire Strikes Out); Anna Graves (Note: Disney Infinity 3.0); Carolyn Hennesy (Note: Lego Star Wars: All-Stars Star Wars Resistance); Joyce Kurtz (Note: Rogue Squadron III: Rebel Strike Star Wars: Battlefront II (2005)); Misty Lee (Note: Star Wars Battlefront Star Wars Battlefront II (2017)); Patricia Parris (Note: Read-Along books/records (1979-1983, 1997, 2015) Rebel Mission to Ord Mantell); Ann Sachs (Note: Radio dramas); Catherine Taber (Note: The Force Unleashed The Force Unleashed II Star Wars Detours); Pat Welsh (Note: Return of the Jedi (as Boushh)); April Winchell (Note: Phineas and Ferb); Shelby Young (Note: Star Wars Forces of Destiny Lego Star Wars: Summer Vacation)
- Motion capture: Ingvild Deila (Note: Rogue One); Billie Lourd (Note: The Rise of Skywalker)

In-universe information
- Full name: Leia Organa (Note: Leia's birth name is Leia Amidala Skywalker.)
- Occupation: Princess of Alderaan; Imperial Senator; New Republic Senator; General of the Resistance
- Affiliation: Imperial Senate; Rebel Alliance; New Republic; Resistance
- Family: Anakin Skywalker (biological father); Padmé Amidala (biological mother); Luke Skywalker (twin brother); Bail Organa (adoptive father); Breha Organa (adoptive mother)
- Spouse: Han Solo (husband)
- Children: Ben Solo (son); Others in Legends (Note: Leia's children in the Star Wars Legends narrative universe include her daughter Jaina Solo and her sons Jacen Solo and Anakin Solo.)
- Relatives: Shmi Skywalker (grandmother)
- Home: Alderaan

Princess Leia Organa (/ˈleɪ.ə/ or /ˈliːə/) is a fictional character in the Star Wars franchise. Introduced in the original Star Wars film (1977) (Note: Later retitled Star Wars Episode IV: A New Hope) and its novelization (1976), Leia is a princess of the planet Alderaan, a member of the Imperial Senate, and an agent of the Rebel Alliance. She thwarts the Sith Lord Darth Vader and helps bring about the destruction of the Empire's superweapon, the Death Star. In The Empire Strikes Back (1980), Leia commands a Rebel base and evades Vader as she falls in love with the smuggler Han Solo. In Return of the Jedi (1983), she helps rescue Han from the crime lord Jabba the Hutt, and is revealed to be Vader's daughter and the twin sister of Luke Skywalker. Leia is portrayed by Carrie Fisher in the original film trilogy and the sequel trilogy.

The 2005 prequel film Revenge of the Sith reveals that Leia's mother is Senator Padmé Amidala of Naboo, who dies after childbirth. Leia's father is Anakin Skywalker, a Jedi who falls to the dark side of the Force and becomes Darth Vader. After her mother's death, Leia is adopted by Senator Bail Organa of Alderaan and his wife, Queen Breha. In the sequel trilogy, Leia is a founder and General of the Resistance, which fights against the First Order. She and Han have a son named Ben Solo, who turned to the dark side and became the First Order warlord Kylo Ren. In The Rise of Skywalker (2019), it is revealed that Leia was trained as a Jedi by Luke sometime after the events of Return of the Jedi. Leia dies towards the end of the film but returns as a Force spirit alongside Luke.

One of the more popular Star Wars characters, Leia has been called a 1980s icon, a feminist hero and a model for other adventure heroines. She has appeared in many derivative works and merchandising, including the Star Wars Legends narrative universe, and she has been referenced or parodied in several TV shows and films. Her "cinnamon bun" hairstyle from Star Wars (1977) and her metal bikini from Return of the Jedi have become iconic cultural symbols. Fisher was nominated for the Saturn Award for Best Actress for Star Wars and Return of the Jedi. She also received Saturn Award nominations for Best Supporting Actress for The Force Awakens and The Last Jedi, the latter being a posthumous nomination.

== Creation and development ==
In 1999, Star Wars creator George Lucas reflected on his early development of the original film's main characters:

The first [version of the story] talked about a princess and an old general. The second version involved a father, his son, and his daughter; the daughter was the heroine of the film. Now the daughter has become Luke, Mark Hamill's character. There was also the story of two brothers where I transformed one of them into a sister. The older brother was imprisoned, and the young sister had to rescue him and bring him back to their dad.

The character Princess Leia went through various changes as George Lucas wrote and refined the Star Wars screenplay. In one early draft, she was the spoiled teenage daughter of King Kayos and Queen Breha of Aquilae. In a later version, she was Luke's cousin and the daughter of Owen Lars and his wife Beru. A subsequent story synopsis established her as Leia Antilles, the child of Bail Antilles from the peaceful world of Organa Major. In the fourth draft, she is Leia Organa of Alderaan, which is how she appears in the finished film.

In his early story development for The Empire Strikes Back, Lucas intended for Luke to have a twin sister—not Leia—who would be the focus of another film. Following the production of Empire, Lucas was burnt out and decided not to make his planned sequel trilogy. Needing to explain the identity of the other potential Jedi mentioned by Yoda, Lucas decided that Leia would be revealed as Luke's twin.

In an early draft of the screenplay for Return of the Jedi, Obi-Wan tells Luke a slightly different story about his twin sister than that which appears in the finished film. He explains that Luke's sister and their mother were sent to a distant star system for protection. Their mother died soon after, and Luke's sister was adopted by the governor of Alderaan and his wife, who were friends of Obi-Wan.

== Portrayal ==
Carrie Fisher was 19 when she was cast as Princess Leia. She was cast over Karen Allen, Glenn Close, Farrah Fawcett, Anjelica Huston, Amy Irving, Jessica Lange, Terri Nunn, Linda Purl, Meryl Streep and Cindy Williams. (Note: Attributed to multiple references:) Jodie Foster was offered the role, but turned it down as she was under contract with Disney. (Note: Attributed to multiple references:) After meeting Fisher, Mark Hamill said that she defied his expectations. Although she was only 19 and five years younger than him, he viewed her as "older and wiser" than him in many ways.

In 2014, Fisher reflected on playing Leia. She said the character is worried, angry and "snarky" for much of the original trilogy, and that those attributes "aren't fun things to play." She stated that she would have rather played the "wry and sardonic" Han Solo than Leia. Fisher said that killing Jabba the Hutt was the most satisfying moment of her acting career.

== Characterization ==
Anthony Breznican of Entertainment Weekly has described Leia as a diplomat, spy, warrior, and undercover agent. Fisher has described her as a soldier. Fisher explained to Rolling Stone in 1983 that since Leia has no friends or family, all she has is a cause—the Rebellion—after her home planet is destroyed. Fisher claimed that Leia is often angry because it was the only way the filmmakers knew how to make her strong.

Writing in 2015, Alyssa Rosenberg of The Washington Post examined Leia's character and her relationship with Han. Rosenberg praised Leia's courage and resiliency in the face of imprisonment, torture, and the destruction of her home planet. She claimed that Leia and Han end up in conflict because she insists on asserting authority and he automatically resists, even as she proves herself to be worthy of it. Regarding Han's attempt to pry a confession of love out of Leia in The Empire Strikes Back, Rosenberg writes that "Han's not wrong that if Leia doesn't figure out that she's a person with needs, she's going to burn out ... In a way, it's an early confession of love: Han's anxious about the bounty hunters who are still pursuing him ... But he would stay and give his love and support to Leia if she could just acknowledge that she needs him."

Following the release of Return of the Jedi, Fisher commented on the way Leia is depicted: "[She] gets to be more feminine, more supportive, more affectionate. But let's not forget that these movies are basically boys' fantasies. So the other way they made her more female in this one was to have her take off her clothes."

== Appearances ==
=== Original trilogy ===
==== Star Wars ====
Introduced in Star Wars (1977), Princess Leia of Alderaan is a member of the Imperial Senate and a leader in the Rebel Alliance. She is captured when Darth Vader boards her ship, demanding that she reveal the location of stolen architectural plans for the Death Star, the Galactic Empire's battle station. Before her interrogation, Leia hid the plans inside the droid R2-D2, and sent him to find one of the last remaining Jedi, Obi-Wan Kenobi. Vader takes Leia to the Death Star and tortures her, but she offers him no information. The Death Star commander Grand Moff Tarkin threatens to destroy Alderaan unless she reveals the location of the Rebel base. She provides the location of an abandoned headquarters on Dantooine, but Tarkin obliterates Alderaan anyway. Leia is rescued by Luke Skywalker, Han Solo and Chewbacca. They escape aboard Han's ship, the Millennium Falcon. After analyzing the Death Star schematics, the Rebels find a small weakness in the battle station, which allows Luke to destroy it with torpedoes launched from his X-wing. After the victory, Leia honors Luke, Han and Chewbacca for their heroism.

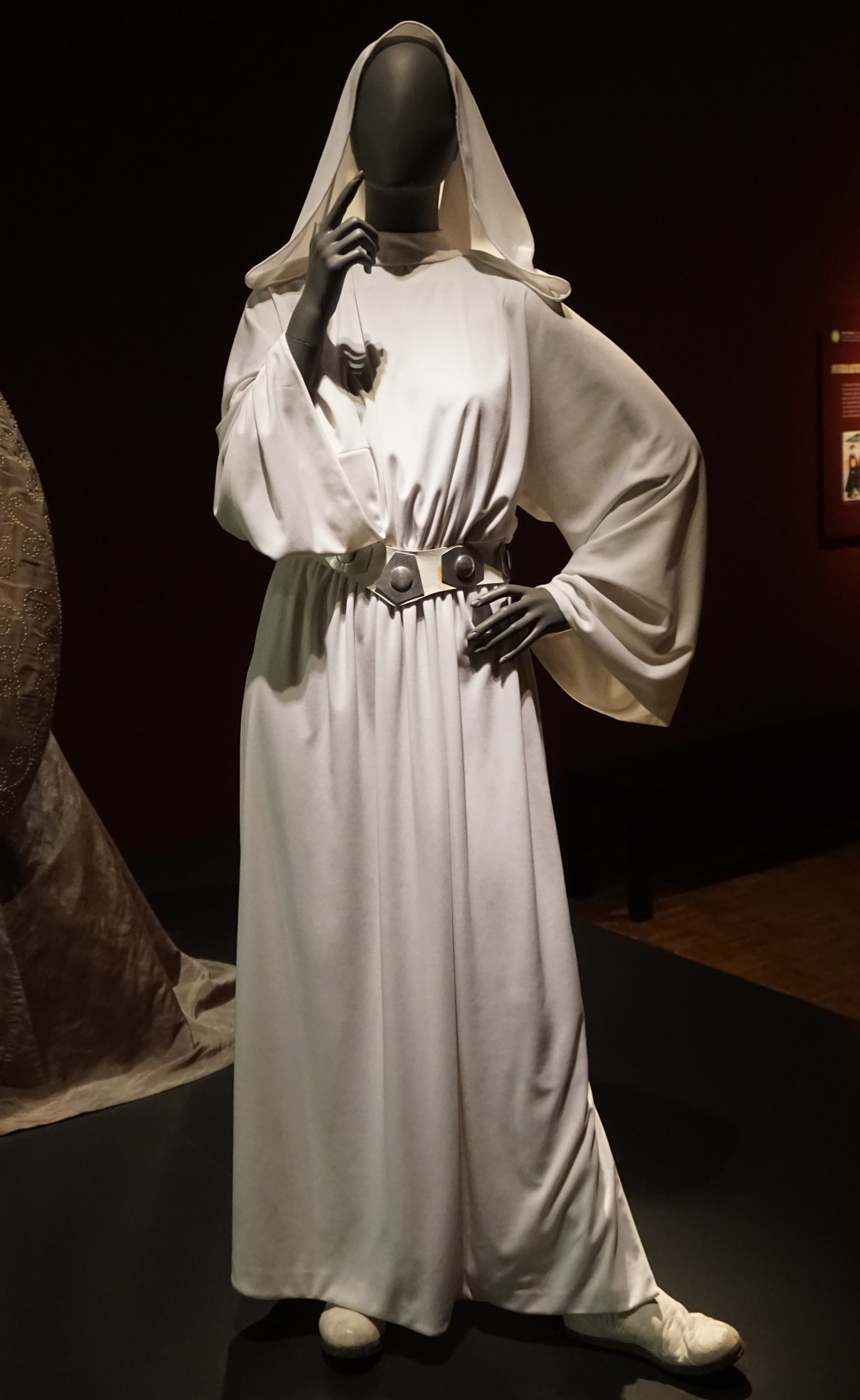
Princess Leia's white gown from the original Star Wars film

Fisher claimed that in the original script, when Luke and Han arrive to rescue Leia, she is unconscious, her eyes are yellow and she is hanging upside down, imagery which alludes to the 1973 horror film The Exorcist. Fisher explained that the scene was changed because Chewbacca would have had to carry Leia for an extended period of time.

==== The Empire Strikes Back ====
In The Empire Strikes Back (1980), Leia is commanding the Rebel base on Hoth. As Han prepares to leave the base to pay off Jabba, he tries to make Leia admit that she has romantic feelings for him. When Imperial forces arrive and assault the base, Leia leads an evacuation. She then flees with Han, Chewbacca and C-3PO in the Falcon. While hiding in an asteroid field, Leia and Han share a kiss. With the ship needing repairs, Han seeks out his old friend Lando Calrissian in Cloud City. Lando welcomes the group graciously, but has betrayed them to the Empire. He turns them over to Vader, who hopes to use them as bait to capture Luke. Leia confesses her love for Han as he is frozen in carbonite and handed over to the bounty hunter Boba Fett. As Lando, Leia, and Chewbacca escape from Cloud City, Leia senses that Luke is in trouble, and she orders Chewbacca to turn the ship around and rescue him. He was wounded during a lightsaber duel with Vader, and used the Force to contact Leia.

==== Return of the Jedi ====
In Return of the Jedi (1983), Leia infiltrates Jabba the Hutt's palace on Tatooine disguised as the Ubese bounty hunter Boushh. She frees Han from the carbonite, but they are both recaptured by Jabba, who chains Leia and outfits her in a metal bikini. After Luke arrives and kills Jabba's rancor, the crime lord sentences Luke, Han and Chewbacca to be fed to a Sarlacc, a deadly ground-dwelling beast. The group overpowers their captors, and Leia strangles Jabba to death with her chain. The companions then escape the planet and return to the Rebel base. Later, they travel to the forest moon of Endor to disable a shield protecting the second Death Star. There, Luke reveals to Leia that he is her twin brother and that Vader is their father. After joining forces with a tribe of Ewoks, the Rebels manage to destroy the Death Star and defeat the Empire.

=== Revenge of the Sith ===
In the prequel film Revenge of the Sith (2005), Anakin Skywalker's wife Padmé Amidala is pregnant with twins near the end of the Clone Wars. After Anakin turns to the dark side of the Force and becomes Darth Vader, Padmé gives birth to Luke and Leia on Polis Massa and then dies. Leia is adopted by Senator Bail Organa of Alderaan and his wife, Queen Breha.

=== Sequel trilogy ===
==== The Force Awakens ====
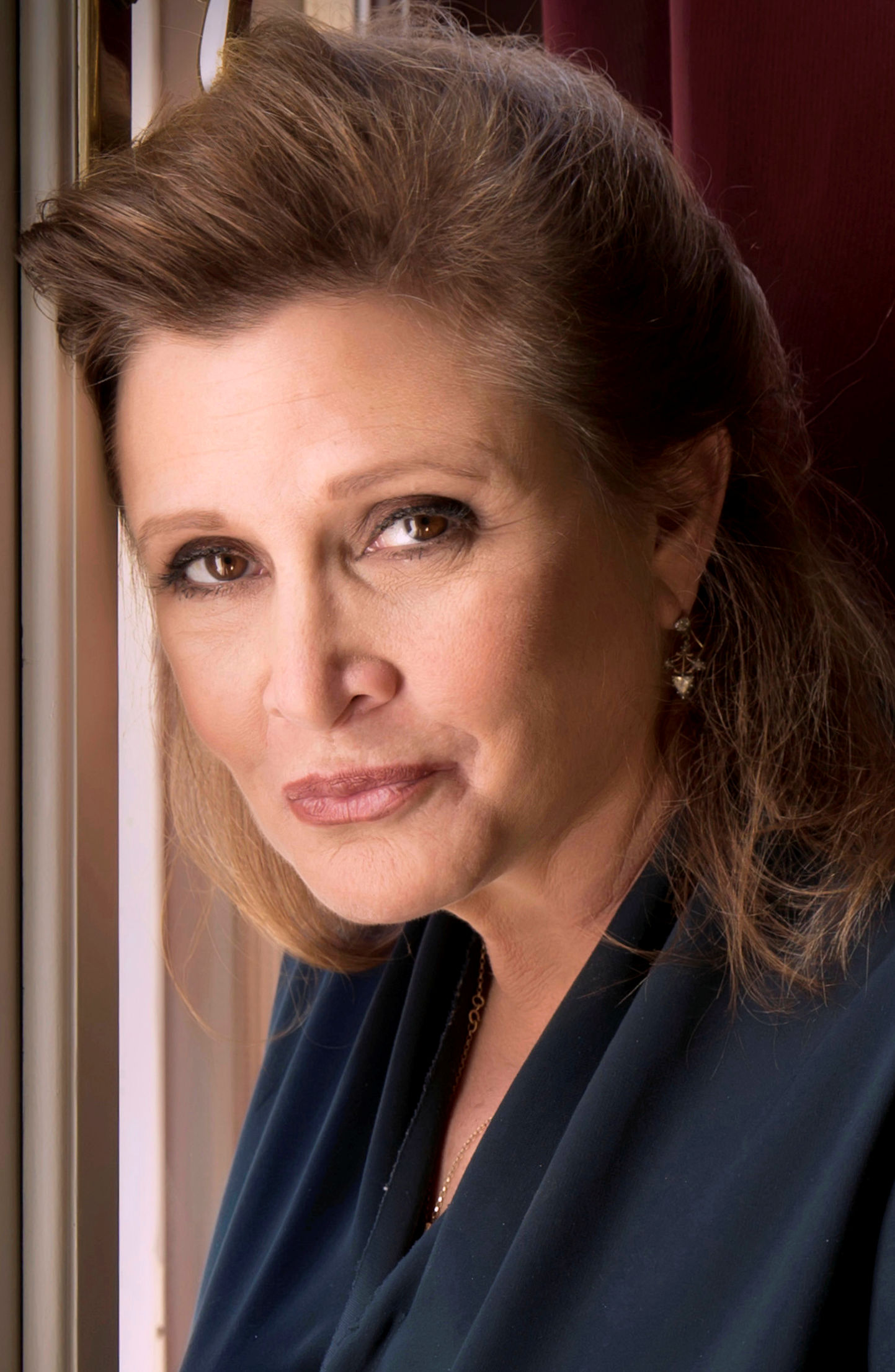
Carrie Fisher reprised the role of Leia in The Force Awakens (2015).

Leia returns in The Force Awakens (2015), which takes place thirty years after the events of Return of the Jedi. She is the leader of the Resistance, an organization she formed to fight the First Order. She is also trying to find her brother Luke, who disappeared years earlier. After a battle on the planet Takodana, she reunites with Han. They discuss their son, Ben Solo, who left Jedi training and fell to the dark side of the Force, becoming the First Order warlord Kylo Ren. Leia believes Ren can be brought back from the dark side, and urges Han to bring him home. When Han encounters Ren on Starkiller Base, he asks him to abandon the First Order. Ren refuses and instead kills his father. Leia senses Han's death through the Force, and later shares a moment of grief with the scavenger Rey, who viewed Han as a father figure.

Although Leia appears as a Jedi in various Star Wars Legends works, she is not depicted that way in The Force Awakens. The film's director, J.J. Abrams, explained that Leia's decision to lead the Resistance instead of training as a Jedi was "simply a choice that she made". Nevertheless, he affirmed that Leia's strength with the Force is an intrinsic part of her character. Asked to describe Leia in the film, Fisher said her character is under "a lot of pressure" and is likely feeling defeated, tired, and angry. Fisher was nominated for a 2016 Saturn Award for Best Supporting Actress for her performance.

==== The Last Jedi ====
Fisher returns as Leia in The Last Jedi, the 2017 sequel to The Force Awakens. When Leia's ship is attacked by the First Order, she is expelled into space, but uses the Force to pull herself back onboard. After recovering, she shoots and stuns the Resistance pilot Poe Dameron, who mutinied against Vice Admiral Holdo. From his self-imposed exile on Ahch-To, Luke uses the Force to project himself to the Resistance stronghold on Crait. He reunites with Leia and apologizes for Ben's fall to the dark side. Leia says that her son is gone, but Luke assures her that nobody is ever truly gone. While Luke sacrifices himself by distracting Ren and his troops, Leia and the remaining Resistance forces escape in the Falcon. The filming of Fisher's scenes was completed shortly before her death on December 27, 2016. (Note: Attributed to multiple references:)

==== The Rise of Skywalker ====
Following Fisher's death, Variety reported that she was slated to appear in The Rise of Skywalker (2019). Instead of creating a digital version of Fisher, Lucasfilm added her to the film by utilizing footage of her that was shot for The Force Awakens but never used. (Note: Attributed to multiple references:) Fisher's daughter Billie Lourd, who portrays Lieutenant Connix in all three sequel trilogy films, stepped in as Leia for a brief flashback scene. Lourd's face was digitally replaced by Fisher's, using imagery from Return of the Jedi.

In The Rise of Skywalker, Leia continues to lead the Resistance while guiding Rey in her Jedi training; a flashback presented later reveals that Leia abandoned her own Jedi instruction with Luke after seeing a vision of her son's death. While Rey and Ren duel on Kef Bir, Leia uses all of her remaining strength to reach out to Ren through the Force. Rey impales him while he is distracted, then heals his wound as Leia dies. During the climactic battle on Exegol, a transformed Ben Solo utilizes the remainder of his life force to revive a comatose Rey, then vanishes into the Force at the same time as his mother. Rey travels to the Lars homestead on Tatooine and buries the lightsabers that had belonged to Leia and Luke. As the Force spirits of her two mentors look on, Rey tells a passerby that her name is "Rey Skywalker."

=== Rogue One ===
Leia makes a brief appearance in the final scene of the 2016 film Rogue One. She receives the stolen plans for the Death Star as a lead-up to the beginning of Star Wars. Since Rogue One takes place just prior to the original trilogy, a young Leia was required. To create this effect, a computer-generated image of a young Carrie Fisher was superimposed over the face of the actress Ingvild Deila. Archival audio of Fisher was used to voice the character.

=== Series ===
A teenage Princess Leia, voiced by Julie Dolan, appears in a 2016 episode of the animated series Star Wars Rebels, which is set between Revenge of the Sith and Star Wars. In the episode, Leia is sent on a secret mission for the Rebel Alliance. Dave Filoni, the executive producer of Rebels, said the intention was to show Leia developing her leadership abilities. He added that in the series, Leia is "part of the Empire. She doesn't believe in the Empire, but she is acting the part, almost a double agent." Leia also appears in the web series Forces of Destiny (2017–2018) voiced by Shelby Young, and in Star Wars Resistance, voiced by Rachel Butera and Carolyn Hennesy.

Leia appears as a ten-year-old child in the 2022 live-action series Obi-Wan Kenobi, portrayed by Vivien Lyra Blair. Of Blair's casting, series writer Joby Harold said the show wanted an actor who would embody a young Carrie Fisher. In a review of the series, Eric Deggans of NPR wrote that Blair "practically channels Carrie Fisher's subversive, wisecracking spirit".

=== Novels ===
Leia makes her first literary appearance in Star Wars: From the Adventures of Luke Skywalker, the novelization of the original 1977 film Star Wars, which was released six months before the film in November 1976. Credited to Lucas but ghostwritten by Alan Dean Foster, the novel was based on Lucas' screenplay. Leia later appeared in the novelizations The Empire Strikes Back (1980) by Donald F. Glut and Return of the Jedi (1983) by James Kahn. She is also a point-of-view character in the 2015 novelization of The Force Awakens by Foster.

Foster's 1978 novel Splinter of the Mind's Eye was commissioned by Lucas as the basis for a potential low-budget sequel to Star Wars should the film prove unsuccessful. In the story, Luke and Leia seek a crystal on a swampy planet and eventually face Vader in combat.

Leia appears in the Journey to Star Wars: The Force Awakens line of novels and comics, which were introduced to connect The Force Awakens with previous films. She is featured in the young adult novel Moving Target: A Princess Leia Adventure (2015) by Cecil Castellucci and Jason Fry, which is set between The Empire Strikes Back and Return of the Jedi, and Claudia Gray's novels Star Wars: Bloodline (2016) and Leia: Princess of Alderaan (2017). The former is set six years before The Force Awakens, while the latter features a 16-year-old Leia before the events of A New Hope. She also leads in Beth Revis' Star Wars: The Princess and the Scoundrel which is set immediately right after Return of the Jedi.

=== Comics ===
Leia appears in the limited series Star Wars: Princess Leia (2015), which takes place immediately after Star Wars. She is also featured in the four-part series Star Wars: Shattered Empire (2015), set immediately after Return of the Jedi. Princess Leia depicts Leia training in martial arts on Alderaan and explores her reaction to the destruction of the planet, while Shattered Empire portrays her as a skilled pilot who undertakes a dangerous mission alongside Poe Dameron's mother. Leia also appears in Star Wars #12.

=== Other ===
Leia appears briefly in the 1978 television film The Star Wars Holiday Special as a leader and administrator of the new Rebel Alliance base. She and C-3PO contact Chewbacca's wife Mallatobuck for assistance in finding Chewbacca and Han. Leia also appears in the animated segment at a different base in an asteroid field, and at the Life Day ceremony at the end of the film. Fisher also appeared in and hosted the November 18, 1978, episode of Saturday Night Live that aired one day after the special.

== Star Wars Legends ==
Following the acquisition of Lucasfilm by The Walt Disney Company in 2012, most of the licensed Star Wars Expanded Universe material produced between 1977 and 2014 was rebranded as Star Wars Legends and declared non-canon to the franchise. (Note: Attributed to multiple references:) In the Legends narrative universe, Leia battles remnants of the Empire after the events of Return of the Jedi. She becomes the chief of state of the New Republic and a Jedi Master, and raises three children with Han: Jaina, Jacen and Anakin Solo.

=== Novels ===
The 1991 New York Times bestselling novel Heir to the Empire by Timothy Zahn began what would become a large collection of works set before, between and especially after the original films.

==== Post-Return of the Jedi ====
The bestselling Thrawn trilogy (1991–93) by Timothy Zahn begins five years after the events of Return of the Jedi. In Heir to the Empire (1991), Leia is married to Han and three months pregnant with twins. Noghri commandos repeatedly attempt to kidnap her as part of Grand Admiral Thrawn's plan to restore the Empire and crush the New Republic. In Dark Force Rising (1992), Leia realizes that Darth Vader and the Empire deceived the Noghri to secure their allegiance, and by revealing the truth she turns the alien race to the side of the New Republic. At one point, she remembers her adoptive parents on Alderaan, implying that the "mother" she discussed with Luke on Endor was Queen Breha. In The Last Command (1993), Leia gives birth to the twins Jaina and Jacen Solo on Coruscant during Thrawn's siege.

Leia, now the Chief of State of the New Republic, is a minor character in the Jedi Academy trilogy (1994) by Kevin J. Anderson, set after the Thrawn trilogy. Next in the timeline is the Callista trilogy: Children of the Jedi (1995) by Barbara Hambly, Darksaber (1995) by Anderson and Planet of Twilight (1997) by Hambly. In The Crystal Star (1994) by Vonda McIntyre, young Jacen, Jaina and their three-year-old brother Anakin are kidnapped in a plot to restore the Empire, but are rescued by Leia and Chewbacca. Leia struggles with the responsibilities of her position in The Black Fleet Crisis trilogy (1996) by Michael P. Kube-McDowell. In The New Rebellion (1996) by Kristine Kathryn Rusch, she avoids an assassination attempt and then aids in the defeat of the Dark Jedi Kueller, whom she shoots to death. The Corellian trilogy (1995) by Roger MacBride Allen finds Han and Leia swept up in a civil war while visiting his homeworld of Corellia with their children. In the two Hand of Thrawn novels by Timothy Zahn (1997's Specter of the Past and 1998's Vision of the Future), Leia tries to hold the New Republic together as Moff Disra conspires for its volatile factions to destroy each other. Leia appears periodically in the Young Jedi Knights series (1995–98) by Kevin J. Anderson and Rebecca Moesta. The 14-volume young adult fiction series covers the Jedi training of Jacen and Jaina. (Note: Attributed to multiple references:)

In The Truce at Bakura (1993) by Kathy Tyers, set one day after the ending of Return of the Jedi, Leia establishes New Alderaan, a sanctuary for the destroyed planet's surviving inhabitants. The spirit of Anakin Skywalker appears to Leia and pleads for her forgiveness, but she angrily banishes him. The six-volume Jedi Prince series (1992–93) by Paul Davids and Hollace Davids, later contradicted by other novels, is set within a year after Return of the Jedi. In The Glove of Darth Vader (1992), the self-proclaimed son of the defeated Emperor Palpatine, Trioculus, seeks the titular glove to cement himself as the new Emperor. Entranced by Leia's beauty in The Lost City of the Jedi (1992), Trioculus vows to make her his queen. He captures her in Zorba the Hutt's Revenge (1992), but Jabba the Hutt's vengeful father, Zorba, offers to trade his own prisoner Ken—Palpatine's real grandson whom Trioculus has been seeking—for Leia, his son's killer. But Leia and Ken are rescued and Trioculus is frozen in carbonate by Zorba. Mission from Mount Yoda (1993) finds Ken's father Triclops alive and willing to join the Rebels against the Empire. Leia, now engaged to Han, is captured by Zorba in Queen of the Empire (1993). Trioculus is revived and seizes Leia before Zorba can kill her. Leia is rescued and replaced with a lookalike droid decoy, which kills Trioculus. In Prophets of the Dark Side (1993), Leia looks forward to her wedding to Han and has a vision of their two children. Matthew Stover's 2008 standalone novel Luke Skywalker and the Shadows of Mindor picks up the story soon after, as Luke, Leia and the Rebels fight the Sith Lord Shadowspawn.

In The Courtship of Princess Leia (1994) by Dave Wolverton, set immediately before the Thrawn trilogy, Leia is presented with an advantageous political marriage to Prince Isolder of the planet Hapes. A jealous Han abducts Leia and takes her to the planet Dathomir; Luke and Isolder follow, and there they all find the hidden forces of the Imperial warlord Zsinj. Defeating him, Han and Leia marry. The 2003 novels A Forest Apart and Tatooine Ghost by Troy Denning are set immediately after The Courtship of Princess Leia. The newly married Leia fears that any children she has may succumb to the dark side like her father. During an adventure on Tatooine in Tatooine Ghost, she discovers the diary of her grandmother Shmi Skywalker and meets some of young Anakin's childhood friends. When she learns of Anakin's childhood as a slave and the traumatic death of his mother, Leia learns to forgive her father.

==== Works set between films ====
In Shadows of the Empire (1996) by Steve Perry, the only Star Wars novel set between The Empire Strikes Back and Return of the Jedi, Leia is searching for Boba Fett to find a captive Han. She is bewitched by the crime lord Prince Xizor using pheromones, but Chewbacca helps her elude the seduction.

Allegiance (2007) and Choices of One (2011) by Timothy Zahn are set between Star Wars: A New Hope and The Empire Strikes Back, and feature Leia and her cohorts seeking new allies for their Rebellion against the Empire. Razor's Edge (2013) by Martha Wells and Honor Among Thieves (2014) by James S. A. Corey take place in the same time period and also chronicle the adventures of Leia and Han.

==== New Jedi Order ====
In the New Jedi Order series (1999–2003), Leia resigns as Chief of State, and on the heels of her warnings before the Senate, the alien Yuuzhan Vong invade the galaxy. They destroy system after system and defeat both the Jedi and the New Republic forces in countless battles. Chewbacca dies in Vector Prime (1999) by R.A. Salvatore, which sends Han into a deep depression that causes a rift between him and Leia. They reunite after Leia is gravely wounded at the Battle of Duro in Kathy Tyers' Balance Point (2000). She is targeted by a deadly Voxyn slayer in Troy Dennings' Star By Star (2001), and though she manages to evade death, her son Anakin is later killed during a mission to prevent more Voxyn from being cloned. The Vong are finally defeated in The Unifying Force (2003) by James Luceno.

In Denning's The Dark Nest trilogy (2005), Leia, Han, and several Jedi become involved in an escalating border dispute between the Chiss and the insidious insectoid Killiks, and Leia makes a bitter enemy in the Twi'lek warrior Alema Rar. In The Joiner King (2005), Leia asks Saba Sebatyne to train her as a Jedi Knight. R2-D2 malfunctions in The Unseen Queen (2005) and shows Luke a holoclip of his father Anakin and a pregnant woman, whom Luke learns is his and Leia's biological mother, Padmé Amidala. Anakin and Padmé are discussing a dream of Anakin's in which Padmé dies in childbirth; later, Luke and Leia watch a clip in which Padmé is talking to Obi-Wan Kenobi about Anakin. Tenel Ka, Queen Mother of the Hapes Consortium, has a daughter, Allana, secretly fathered by Jacen. In The Swarm War (2005), Luke and Leia view holoclips of their mother's death, and Leia is promoted to Jedi Knight.

==== Legacy of the Force ====
The bestselling Legacy of the Force series (2006–08) chronicles the crossover of Han and Leia's son Jacen to the dark side of the Force while the Jedi, Solos, and Skywalkers fight against his growing power. (Note: Attributed to multiple references:) In Betrayal (2006) by Aaron Allston, Jacen turns to the dark side, believing that it is the only way to save the galaxy from the chaos brewing among the member systems of the Galactic Alliance. Jacen realizes in Bloodlines (2006) by Karen Traviss that the Sith discipline will require him to kill one of his loved ones, which he decides is an acceptable sacrifice to save the galaxy. In Troy Denning's Tempest (2006), Han and Leia thwart the assassination of Tenel Ka and Allana but become caught up in a Corellian conspiracy. They are almost killed when the Millennium Falcon is attacked by a Star Destroyer controlled by an increasingly powerful Jacen—who knows that his parents are on board. With Han injured, Leia and Lando further investigate the Corellians in Aaron Allston's Exile (2007), but Alema reappears to exact her vengeance on Leia.

Sacrifice (2007) by Karen Traviss finds Leia and Han on the run, hunted by Jacen as traitors to the Galactic Alliance. He kills Luke's wife Mara Jade as his final sacrifice to become Darth Caedus, the new ruler of the Sith. In Inferno (2007) by Troy Denning, Han and Leia are faced with the reality that their son, now Joint Chief of State, is the enemy. Leia attempts unsuccessfully to manipulate Jacen in Aaron Allston's Fury (2007) so that the Jedi can both thwart him and neutralize Alema. Finally, in Invincible (2008) by Troy Denning, Jaina kills Jacen in a lightsaber duel. At Tenel Ka's request, Leia and Han adopt Allana, disguised with the name "Amelia" to protect her from any future vengeance against Cadeus or the Hapes Consortium.

==== Other novels ====
The nine-volume Fate of the Jedi series (2009–12) by Aaron Allston, Troy Denning, and Christie Golden finds Han and Leia become caught up in the intensifying conflict between the Galactic Alliance and the Jedi. In the wake of Darth Cadeus' death, the now-peaceful Galactic Alliance harbors a growing mistrust toward the Jedi, and the situation is worsened by a Force-induced psychosis that begins afflicting individual Jedi, sending them on violent rampages.

In Millennium Falcon (2008) by James Luceno, set between Legacy of the Force and Fate of the Jedi, a mysterious device hidden inside the eponymous spacecraft sends Han, Leia and Allana on an adventure to investigate the ship's past before it came into Han's possession. Troy Denning's Crucible (2013), set after Fate of the Jedi and the last novel to date in the Star Wars Legends chronology, reunites Leia, Han and Luke with Lando as they aid him to thwart a vast criminal enterprise threatening his asteroid mineral refinery in the Chilean Rift nebula.

=== Comics ===
Leia's youth is depicted in the Star Wars Tales story The Princess Leia Diaries. Leia develops a disdain for the Empire, as well as a conflict with Tarkin. She discovers and decides to support the Rebellion.

During the events of the comic series Dark Empire (1991–92), Palpatine has been resurrected in a clone body. As part of his plan to restore the Empire, he seduces Luke to the dark side of the Force. Leia resists Palpatine's attempts to turn her as well, and escapes with the Jedi Holocron, an artifact he needs to secure his power. When Luke pursues her, Leia manages to turn him back. Luke and Leia then fight Palpatine with the light side of the Force, destroying him with his own Force-generated storm. In Dark Empire II (1994–95), Leia gives birth to a third child, Anakin Solo. Palpatine is reborn in a rapidly deteriorating clone body in Empire's End (1995), and seeks to possess the body of the infant Anakin.

=== Video games ===
Leia is a playable character in Star Wars Battlefront, Star Wars Battlefront II, Disney Infinity 3.0, and many Lego Star Wars video games.

Leia was added to Fortnite on November 2022 during their promotional Star Wars week.

Stella portrays Princess Leia in Angry Birds Star Wars and Angry Birds Star Wars II, known as Princess Stella Organa. In the first game, she leads the Bird Rebels against the evil Pig Empire led by Emperor Piglatine. in gameplay, her ability is to pulling objects towards her. In the sequel, she returns as a playable character, retaining her same ability.

== Cultural impact ==
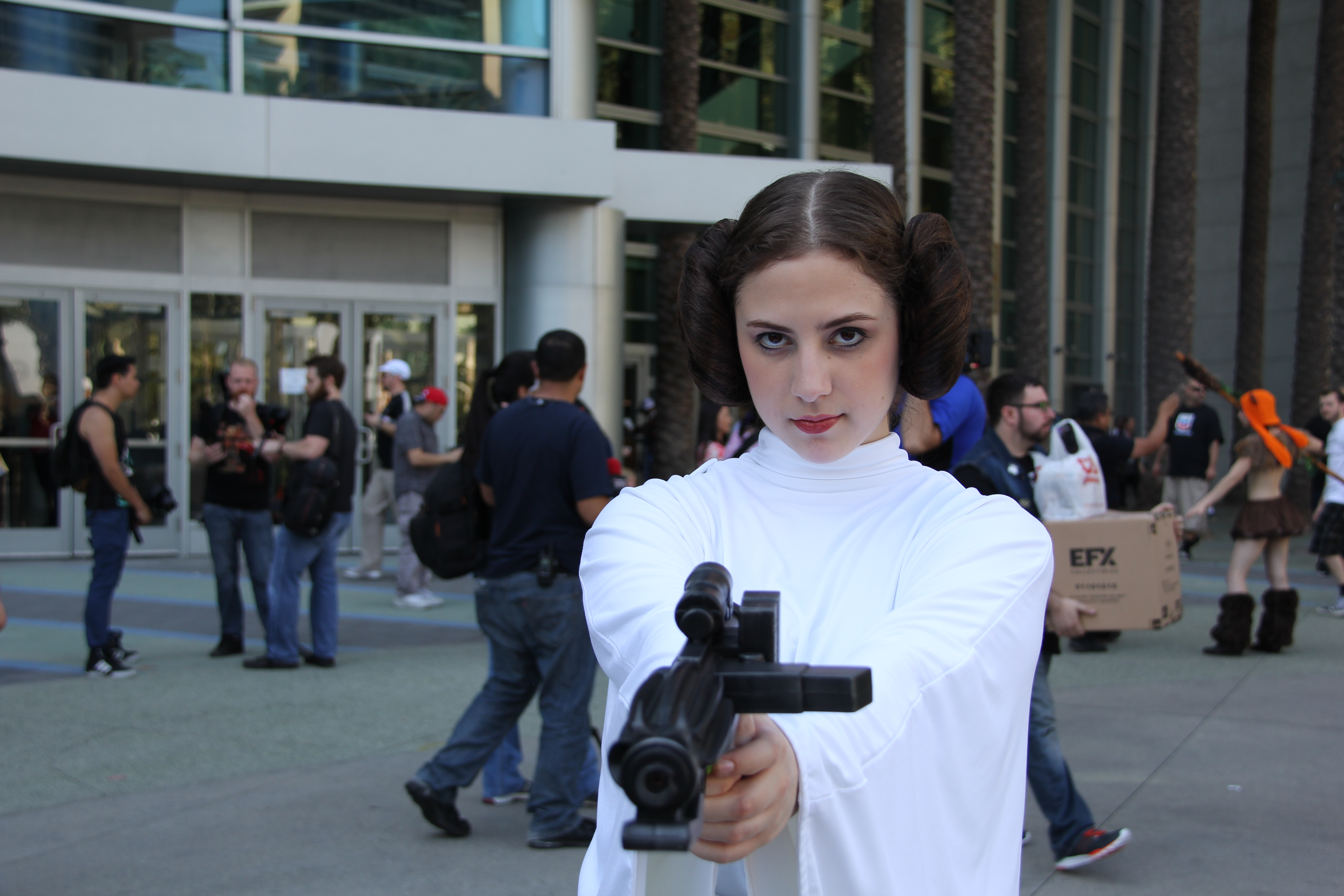
A fan dressed as Princess Leia at Star Wars Celebration 2015 in Anaheim, California

Princess Leia has been called a 1980s icon and a "feminist hero". In 2008, she was selected by Empire magazine as the 89th greatest film character of all time. She has been referenced or parodied in several television shows and films. In 2013, the cartoonist Jeffrey Brown published Star Wars: Vader's Little Princess, a comic strip-style book featuring Darth Vader and a young Leia in humorous father-daughter situations. The book became a bestseller. (Note: Attributed to multiple references:)

Leia has also featured in a wide range of Star Wars merchandise, including statuettes, action figures and other toys, household items and clothing, office supplies, food products, and shampoo in Leia-shaped bottles. (Note: Attributed to multiple references:) In her one-woman show Wishful Drinking, Carrie Fisher called the Princess Leia Pez dispenser a "merchandising horror". In a 2011 interview, Fisher said:

I signed away my likeness for free. In those days, there was no such thing as a "likeness" ... There was no merchandising tied to movies. No one could have known the extent of the franchise. Not that I don't think I'm cute or anything, but when I looked in the mirror, I didn't think I was signing away anything of value.

In 2014, following the 2012 acquisition of Lucasfilm by the Walt Disney Company, the Disney Store stated that the company had no plans for any future Leia-themed products. After public criticism, Disney told Time that it would be releasing several Leia products. Funko has since produced several figurines of Leia, and Hasbro has released an action figure of Leia as she appears in the Star Wars Rebels animated series.

=== "Cinnamon buns" hairstyle ===
Leia's unique hairdo in Star Wars—arranged in two large buns, one on each side of her head—has come to be known as the "doughnut" or "cinnamon buns" hairstyle, and is iconic of the character and the Star Wars franchise. When asked in a 2002 interview about the origins of the hairstyle, Lucas said he was aiming for "a kind of Southwestern Pancho Villa woman revolutionary look" from "turn-of-the-century Mexico." An exhibit at the Denver Art Museum credited a particular revolutionary—later identified as Clara de la Rocha—as an inspiration for the hairdo. The museum stated that Leia's hair arrangement was also influenced by a hairstyle worn by indigenous Hopi women of North America. Empire suggested that Leia's hairdo was based on that of Queen Fria, a character from the 1930s Flash Gordon comic serial. (Note: Lucas had originally wanted to film an adaptation of Flash Gordon, but was unable to obtain the rights, and so began developing an original project which would become Star Wars.) A February 1978 cover story for the British teen magazine Jackie included step-by-step instructions on how to replicate Leia's hair buns.

Leia's hairstyle has been referenced or parodied in The Muppet Show (1980), the film Spaceballs (1987), the short film Hardware Wars (1978), and the television series Scream Queens, in which Fisher's daughter Billie Lourd plays a character who wears earmuffs as an homage to Leia's hairstyle. (Note: Attributed to multiple references:) In the Star Wars sequel trilogy, Lourd portrays Lieutenant Connix, who wears a hairstyle similar to Leia's.

=== Feminist analysis ===
Leia has been the subject of feminist analysis. David Bushman, the television curator at the Paley Center for Media, said in 2012 that Leia, while not perfect, was a creditable character when she debuted. He called her defiant, assertive, and strong. Writing in The Washington Post in 2015, Alyssa Rosenberg called Leia a "great heroine" whose power comes from her "political conviction and acumen". In a 2007 article, Diana Dominguez cited Leia as a welcome change from previous portrayals of women in film and television:

Here was a woman who could play like and with the boys, but who didn't have to become one of the boys and who could, if and when she wanted to, show she liked the boys, a woman who is outspoken, unashamed, and, most importantly, unpunished for being so. She isn't a flirty sex-pot, tossing her hair around seductively to distract the enemy ... She doesn't play the role of "maternal caretaker", although she does display caring and compassion, or "the sweet innocent damsel" who stands passively by while the men do all the work ... Leia is a hero without losing her gendered status; she does not have to play the cute, helpless sex kitten or become sexless and androgynous to get what she wants. She can be strong, sassy, outspoken, bossy, and bitchy, and still be respected and seen as feminine.

Rosenberg claims that Luke is initially an apolitical innocent in search of adventure, while Han is initially a detached opportunist in search of money. She asserts that both Luke and Han become full participants in the Rebellion due to Leia's influence. Leia herself, singularly dedicated to her political movement against the Empire, "finds a partner in Han, acknowledging that personal happiness can help her sustain her commitment to building a better galactic order". Rosenberg cites "Leia's willingness to see the best in him, and Han's desire to live up to her belief in him" as a foundation of their relationship, also pointing out his attempts to make her recognize that she has needs like anyone else and should acknowledge that she needs him.

In a 2012 essay, Ray Merlock and Kathy Merlock Jackson cite Leia as a successor of the earlier science fiction heroines Wilma Deering of Buck Rogers and Dale Arden of Flash Gordon. They call her a new embodiment of the fairy-tale princess in peril, claiming that after Leia, princesses are no longer passive and "salvaged simply with a kiss." Merlock and Merlock Jackson see a reflection of Leia in subsequent Disney princess characters, and in female warriors such as Ellen Ripley from the Alien franchise and Xena from the television series Xena: Warrior Princess. The film critic A. O. Scott of The New York Times described Leia as a precursor of the 21st-century female characters Hermione Granger and Katniss Everdeen.

Fisher's co-star Mark Hamill has described Leia as an "effortlessly feminist" character who does not need to be rescued by a man, and who makes Han and Luke look foolish. Fisher has claimed that Leia is not a damsel in distress, but rather a feisty character and an important feminist icon. Fisher also asserted that Leia is not overly sexualized, and is therefore not threatening to women. Fisher stated that the identity of Leia "eclipses" all other identities she has had. On another occasion, she said, "I think I am Princess Leia, and Princess Leia is me."

=== Metal bikini ===
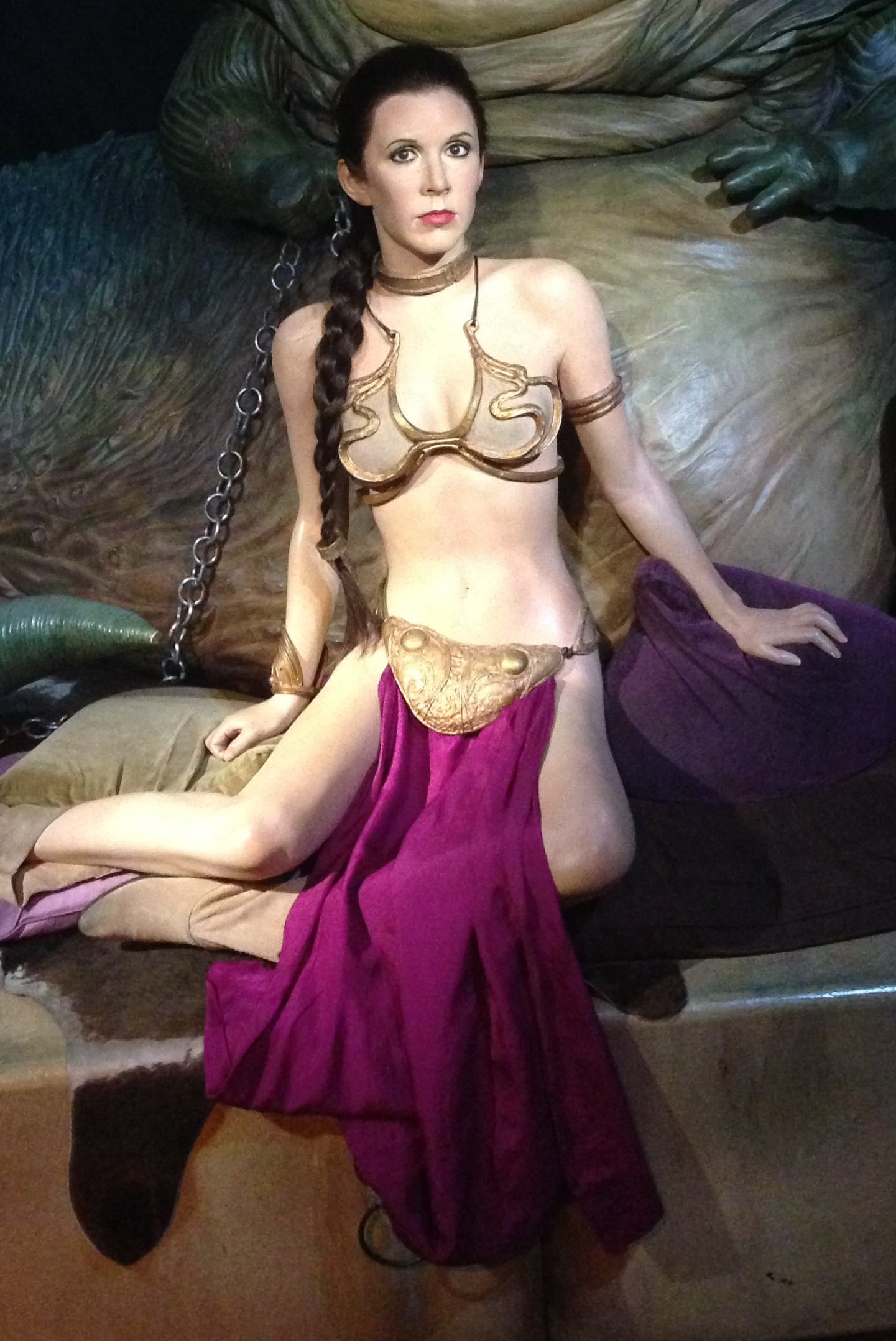
A Princess Leia figure wearing the bikini costume at the Madame Tussauds museum in London

At the beginning of Return of the Jedi, Leia is depicted as a slave of Jabba the Hutt, and she wears a brass bikini costume that has been dubbed the "Metal Bikini" or "Gold Bikini". This costume made both Leia and Fisher sex symbols celebrated by pin-up posters, merchandising and cosplay. (Note: Attributed to multiple references:) Philip Chien of Wired wrote in 2006, "There's no doubt that the sight of Carrie Fisher in the gold sci-fi swimsuit was burned into the sweaty subconscious of a generation of fanboys hitting puberty in the spring of 1983." Fisher said in 2015, "I am not a sex symbol, so that's an opinion of someone. I don't share that".

Allie Townsend of Time wrote in 2011 that the so-called "slave Leia" outfit has gained a cult following of its own. Alyssa Rosenberg claimed that the costume has become culturally iconic "in a way that has slipped loose from the context of the scenes in which Leia wore it and the things she does after she is forced into the outfit." Acknowledging the opinion of some that the "slave Leia" iconography tarnishes the character's position as "feminist hero", Rosenberg argues:

Leia may be captive in these scenes, but she's not exactly a compliant fantasy. Instead, she's biding her time for the moment when she can put that fury into action, carrying out a carefully laid plan to rescue her lover. And when that moment comes, the bikini doesn't condemn Leia to passivity. She rises, and uses the very chains that bind her to strangle the creature who tried to take away her power by turning her into a sex object.

The science fiction filmmaker Letia Clouston concurred, saying "Sci-fi has had a long history of strong female characters. Yes, Princess Leia was in a gold bikini, but she was also the one who single-handedly killed Jabba. When you take into account movies and TV shows like Terminator, Aliens, Battlestar Galactica, and even video games like Metroid, you can see sci-fi has consistently promoted the strength of women more than any other genre." Peter W. Lee argues that the bikini connotes Leia's hopelessness and helplessness, but even in that demeaning costume she retains her dignity and remains an icon of feminism.

The bikini outfit was created by Aggie Guerard Rodgers and Nilo Rodis-Jamero, costume designers for Return of the Jedi. According to Rodgers, the design was inspired by the work of the fantasy illustrator Frank Frazetta. The author and film scholar Rikke Schubart suggested the design was also inspired by the work of Earle K. Bergey. The outfit featured a sculpted metal string bikini top, paired with a bottom consisting of sculpted metal plates in the front and back covering a red silk loincloth. Fisher wore leather boots, serpentine jewelry and a collar and chain that bound her to her captor, which she ultimately uses to strangle him. Multiple versions of the metal bikini were created to accommodate different scenes in the film, including metal pieces by sculptor Richard Miller for scenes in which Fisher remained still, and a rubber version she and stuntwoman Tracy Eddon could wear comfortably while performing stunts. The costume designers made a mold of Fisher's torso so it could be designed to a custom fit. Fisher quipped that the bikini was "what supermodels will eventually wear in the seventh ring of hell."

Fisher posed in the costume for a 1983 cover story in Rolling Stone. The costume has been parodied in various television series and films, including Friends (1996), Family Guy (2000), Fanboys (2009), (Note: Attributed to multiple references:) and Attack of the Show! Yvonne Strahovski's appearance wearing the costume in Chuck (2009) prompted Wizard magazine to rank her No. 24 on its list of the 25 sexiest women on television in 2008. IGN gave Strahovski the top honor in a similar list. Comedian Amy Schumer wore a replica of the outfit for the August 2015 cover of GQ. (Note: Attributed to multiple references:)

An original rubber version of the costume sold for $96,000 at auction in 2015, and another version sold for $175,000 in 2024. Despite its iconic status among many fans of the franchise, the "slave Leia" outfit has sometimes incited controversy. In response to a 2015 news segment in which parents described difficulties explaining toys featuring the costume (including a chain around Leia's neck) to their children, Fisher said, "Tell [the kids] that a giant slug captured me and forced me to wear that stupid outfit, and then I killed him because I didn't like it."

== See also ==
- Skywalker family
- Smurfette principle
