= Young Jedi Knights =

Star Wars fiction series by Kevin J. Anderson and Rebecca Moesta

Star Wars: Young Jedi Knights
- Author: Kevin J. Anderson, Rebecca Moesta
- Country: United States
- Language: English
- Genre: Science fiction, young adult fiction
- Publisher: Berkley Boulevard
- Published: 1995–1998
- Media type: Print (paperback)
- No. of books: 14

Young Jedi Knights is a Star Wars young adult fiction series by science fiction writer Kevin J. Anderson and his wife Rebecca Moesta. It was published from 1995 to 1998. It covers the Jedi training of Jacen and Jaina Solo, the twin children of Han Solo and Leia Organa Solo. The series begins 23 years ABY (After the Battle of Yavin), when the twins are fourteen years old.

Originally intended to cover six novels, the series eventually stretched to fourteen volumes. Another volume was added in 2003 titled Jedi Shadow, which featured the first three books. It spanned three distinct plot arcs:

1. The first plot arc covers the young Jedi Knights' fight against the dark Jedi Brakiss and his Shadow Academy, which eventually builds in strength enough to attack the Jedi academy on Yavin 4. This plot arc also introduces the twins, as well as other supporting characters.
2. The series became popular enough to support a second plot arc, consisting of the novels Shards of Alderaan to The Emperor's Plague. This series deals with the young Jedi Knights' fight against the Diversity Alliance, a group of non-humans seeking to take down the New Republic.
3. The final three-part series details the young Jedi Knights' relationship with Anja Gallandro, the daughter of Gallandro, a gunslinger who died while fighting Han Solo a long time ago.

Because it is geared towards younger readers, the Young Jedi Knights series tackles issues such as racism and drug abuse that are relevant in both the Star Wars universe and the real world. It is also notable for introducing a new generation of Jedi who are featured heavily in later series such as the New Jedi Order, Dark Nest, and Legacy of the Force.

== Characters ==
Jacen Solo
Age: 14-16: Lightsaber: green: Personality: kind, philosophical, humorous.: Description: Jacen is the son of Han Solo and Leia Organa Solo. He has youseld brown hair.
Jaina Solo
The teenage daughter of Han Solo and Leia Organa Solo. Like her father, Jaina is a talented pilot and mechanic.
Lowbacca
The Wookiee nephew of Chewbacca. He is known to his friends as Lowie, and enjoys tinkering with computers.
Em Teedee
Long form of M-TD, a miniature protocol droid that Lowbacca wears on his hip. Em Teedee also translates for Lowbacca. Since he is programmed by C-3PO, Em Teedee has a tendency to be long-winded.
Tenel Ka
Is a young princess of Hapes, though she prefers to be known as a warrior of Dathomir.
Zekk
The childhood friend of Jaina and Jacen, Zekk is adept at finding hidden things.
Brakiss
A dark Jedi who creates the Shadow Academy, the dark Jedi analog to the Jedi academy
Anja Gallandro
The daughter of the notorious gunslinger Gallandro, who was thought to have been killed by Han Solo in one of his earliest adventures.

Other characters
Luke Skywalker, Han Solo, Princess Leia Organa, Chewbacca, Raynar Thul, C-3PO

== Plot summaries ==
=== Book 1: Heirs of the Force ===
Heirs of the Force is about the adventures of Jacen Solo and Jaina Solo during their time at the Jedi Praxeum. After spending a month of training to become Jedi Knights at Luke Skywalker's Jedi academy, Jacen and Jaina's father Han Solo arrives on Yavin 4 with gifts for the twins and a new Jedi trainee — Chewbacca's nephew, Lowbacca. Along with Tenel Ka — a seemingly humorless warrior girl who befriended them during the past month — the twins and "Lowie" become fast friends. To help Lowie communicate with his fellow students, Chewbacca and Han give him a small translator droid named Em Teedee, whose mannerisms bear an uncanny resemblance to those of the droid C-3PO.

After assembling the T-23 skyhopper that his uncle had given to him as a going-away present, Lowie takes it on a test flight. He spots a shiny object glimmering in the branches of a Massassi tree, and returns to the Praxeum, vowing to return as soon as possible. After missing evening meal, Lowie shares his discovery with Jacen, Jaina and Tenel Ka. The next day the four Jedi trainees set out in the skyhopper to investigate Lowie's discovery.

When they arrive at the site, Jacen, Jaina, Lowie, and Tenel Ka discover not just a TIE fighter's wing (the shiny object), but the rest of the TIE fighter as well. Somewhat envious of Lowie's skyhopper, and wanting to face the challenge, Jaina believes that the wrecked TIE fighter can be fixed. Scrounging up parts from the remains of the old Rebel base and the area surrounding the crash, the Jedi trainees go about the task of fixing the wrecked fighter. In addition to the repairs, Jaina decides to install an old hyperdrive unit (that she had received from her father) onto the fighter as well.

Unbeknownst to the Jedi trainees, their work is being watched closely by Qorl, the pilot who had crashed the fighter during the Battle of Yavin. During the past 23 years he has been waiting the opportunity to return to the Empire and help obliterate the Rebellion.

One day while searching for more parts for the TIE fighter, Jacen finds an Imperial insignia that had come off of Qorl's uniform. He searches further, eventually discovering what has been Qorl's home for the past 23 years. He rushes back to the site of the crash and warns Jaina, Tenel Ka, and Lowbacca of the pilot's survival. Immediately thereafter Qorl appears, brandishing a blaster and telling the Jedi trainees that they are his prisoners.

Lowbacca escapes with his skyhopper and attempts to utilize its bulk in attempting to scare Qorl away. Qorl is unfazed, however, and uses his blaster to great effect, critically damaging the skyhopper. Lowie flies away and lands the skyhopper. Grateful that it doesn't explode, he begins to make his way to the Praxeum. In the process of getting there, Em Teedee is detached from Lowbacca's belt and has an adventure with a pack of woolamanders.

Lowbacca arrives at the Praxeum but no one can understand him because he lost Em Teedee. Frustrated, he recalls that Han and Chewbacca are still nearby, checking out Lando Calrissian's new GemDiver Station. He heads to the Praxeum's communications center and informs Han about the situation. Han tells Lowie that he will be back as soon as possible.

Meanwhile, Tenel Ka flees into the jungle. She is then attacked by a number of the two-headed beasts that the disembodied spirit of Exar Kun had sent to destroy Luke Skywalker's body in 11 ABY. She eventually stumbles upon a pack of woolamanders, which provides an effective distraction to the beasts that were hunting her. In the commotion she hears the voice of Em Teedee crying for help. She rescues him and uses his directional sensors to make her way back to the Praxeum.

At the crash site, Qorl marches Jacen and Jaina back to his home at gunpoint. Once there, he restrains them and gives them something to eat. Jaina and Jacen realize that Qorl has had absolutely no contact with the outside world and inform him of the current political situation in the Galaxy. The next day, Qorl marches the twins back to the crash site at gunpoint, ordering them to complete the repairs on the TIE fighter so that he may return to the Empire. The twins do so, and he blasts off, vowing to destroy the Praxeum before reporting back to the Empire.

Han Solo and Chewbacca arrive at the Praxeum in the Millennium Falcon. Shortly before taking off with Lowbacca to save the twins, Han allows Tenel Ka and Em Teedee to board the Falcon. Once they are airborne, they notice a TIE fighter making a beeline for the Praxeum. Qorl tries to fire his laser cannons, but it turns out that the twins didn't restore them to good working order. The Falcon chases him as he flies out of the atmosphere and escapes, using the hyperdrive that Jaina had installed on the TIE fighter.

Once the TIE fighter has made the jump to hyperspace, Han, Chewbacca, Lowie and Tenel Ka head for the crash site, finding that despite looking the worse for wear, Jacen and Jaina seem to be fine. A few days later the Falcon carries the damaged skyhopper back to the Praxeum. Lowie and Jaina immediately begin work on the airspeeder. The four Jedi trainees contemplate whether Qorl made it back to the Empire...

=== Book 2: Shadow Academy ===
Jacen and Jaina are kidnapped by Imperial commandos and whisked off to a hidden station where are imprisoned in the "Shadow Academy" by a Dark Jedi.

The book begins with Lando Calrissian, Han's old buddy, inviting the young Jedi Knights to visit his GemDiver station, a mining facility orbiting the gas planet Yavin. All the Jedi agree to go to GemDiver station, except for Tenel Ka, who stays at the academy because her grandmother is coming to visit, and she does not want her friends to know that she is a princess on her homeworld of Hapes.

Meanwhile, at GemDiver, the twins go fishing for Corusca gems, indestructible jewels that can cut through the toughest armor. All are unsuccessful except for Jacen, who snags a small Corusca gem which he hides in his shoe. Suddenly, the GemDiver station is attacked by an unknown assailant, and Lowie and the twins are kidnapped. When they wake up, they learn they are on the cloaked space station called the Shadow Academy, a place for training Dark Jedi. They are soon introduced to the Dark Master Brakiss and his second in command, the beautiful Nightsister Tamith Kai of Dathomir. For the next weeks they put the young Jedi through vigorous and sometimes deadly training exercises, breaking their spirits, morale, and bodies. They try and turn the Jedi to the dark side of the Force and serve the resurrected Emperor, but the young Jedi Knights resist the temptation.

Meanwhile, Lando informs Luke of the twins' kidnapping, so Luke and Tenel Ka begin to track down the whereabouts of their friends. Their search leads them to Tamith Kai’s home planet of Dathomir, where the Nightsisters and the Singing Mountain clan, old enemies and friends of Luke and Han, reside. There they learn that the Empire is recruiting the Force-talented inhabitants of Dathomir and sending them to the Shadow Academy. Luke and Tenel Ka cleverly get themselves recruited, and then wait as they head towards the secret location of the Shadow Academy.

As Luke and Tenel Ka approach the now uncloaked space station, they take over the ship and fly it into the academy to rescue their friends. To escape, Jacen uses the Corusca gem that was hidden in his shoe to cut through his cell to the door controls, and then frees his twin sister and Lowie shortly afterwards. As they run towards the docking bay to leave, they are confronted by Tamith Kai and Brakiss. Luke and Brakiss exchange a few unpleasant words, while Tamith Kai and Tenel Ka thicken their rivalry with talk of doing battle. But in the end, the Jedi somehow escape without a fight, leaving Brakiss and Tamith Kai to explain their failure to the Emperor. As it turns out, they would not have escaped if it weren't for the help of their old nemesis, the imperial pilot Qorl...

=== Book 3: The Lost Ones ===
During a break from their training at the Jedi Academy, Jacen and Jaina Solo are reunited with their friend Zekk, an orphan and junk collector who lives in the shadowy lower levels of Coruscant. However, because of his disadvantaged upbringing, he often felt ill at ease among his upper-class friends. Eventually, Zekk gets invited to a state banquet though the event ends in a social disaster.

A miserable Zekk flees back into the lower levels of Coruscant only to get captured by the Nightsister Tamith Kai. Tamith Kai was serving the Shadow Academy, which had previously kidnapped Jacen, Jaina and Lowbacca and tried to brainwash them into Dark Jedi. Eventually, Zekk is brainwashed by Brakiss, who ran the academy. He eventually turns against his former friends and becomes one of the Shadow Academy's most powerful Dark Jedi.

=== Book 4: Lightsabers ===
Luke Skywalkers Jedi Academy is going to face the Dark Jedi Knights. First, every member of the New Jedi Academy must make their own lightsabers.

Tenel Ka, a friend of Jacen and Jaina Solo, crafts her handle out of a tooth, but she is in a hurry and doesn't concentrate on making her blade of good quality. Consequently, while she is dueling with Jacen Solo, (the son of Han Solo and Princess Leia) her blade shorts out, explodes and Jacen's blade cuts off her arm.

Tenel Ka then heads home to her grandmother. Jacen, Jaina, and Lowbacca go after her. She learns how to cope with one hand, rebuilds her lightsaber, and (against her grandmothers will) goes back to the Jedi Academy.

=== Book 5: Darkest Knight ===
Jacen and Jaina Solo and their Wookiee companion Lowbacca travel to the Wookiee homeworld of Kashyyyk where Lowie's younger sister Sirrakuk is about to undergo a Wookiee ritual. Since the ritual is dangerous, Lowie wants to assist his sister, Sirra.

However, the Dark Jedi Zekk has been assigned to lead a raid on the Wookiee city of Thikkiiana, a major exporter of computer technology. By executing this mission, he will fulfill his great potential and win the title of the Darkest Knight of the Second Imperium. However, he must face his former friends Jacen and Jaina Solo in the process.

=== Book 6: Jedi Under Siege ===
The final book in the Shadow Academy series explodes with non-stop action and the final confrontation between good and evil. The story begins with an Imperial scout trooper disabling the shield generator of the Jedi Academy, leaving a Yavin 4 moon open for a swift attack. Now fully trained Jedi with their own lightsabers, the young Jedi Knights quickly work together to stop the incoming threat. After Luke briefs all of his students for the battle to come, the twins disband to try to fix the generator and to call for help.

While Jacen and Zekk's good friend Peckhum blast into space to send out a call for help, they are chased by TIE fighters flown by Zekk's former friends. After sending out a distress signal, Jacen and Peckhum dive back into the atmosphere of Yavin 4, about to be obliterated by TIEs. But they are saved at the last second by a familiar face... Qorl, the imperial pilot. Meanwhile, Lowbacca and Tenel Ka attack the landing platform that's unloading Dark Jedi into the jungles of Yavin 4. Eventually Tenel Ka tracks down her nemesis, Tamith Kai, and engages her in a fierce lightsaber battle. The platform explodes, killing Tamith Kai.

Jaina, on a mission to repair the shield generator, is confronted by her former friend turned Dark Jedi Knight Zekk, who is assigned to destroy what's left of the Jedi. In the end, Zekk saves the Jedi by stopping them from returning to the Academy, which is destroyed by a bomb placed in the main audience chamber. Luke tries his best to turn his former student Brakiss back from the darkside, just before they engage in an epic lightsaber duel. Luke is soon victorious, and Brakiss flees back to the Shadow Academy. But as the Jedi's re-enforcements arrive — in the form of Lando Calrissian and his GemDiver Station—the Emperor panics and engages the Shadow Academy's self-destruct. The Dark Jedi's base is instantly destroyed, with Brakiss on it. By the end of the story, all of the Jedi are battered, bruised, and barely alive. But the dark side has lost, Zekk has become the boy they once knew, and the Academy can be rebuilt. It is a day of victory.

=== Book 7: Shards of Alderaan ===
Following the defeat of the Second Imperium, Jacen and Jaina travel to the Alderaan system to retrieve a shard from the planet's core. However, they are not alone as they are being watched by Ailyn Vel, disguised as her father Boba Fett. In the past, Boba Fett had been an enemy of their father Han Solo and his daughter is continuing his legacy.

=== Book 9: Delusions of Grandeur ===
As the young Jedi Knights continue their search for Raynar Thul's father, they turn for assistance to a dangerous resource, the reprogrammed assassin droid IG-88, a fearsome bounty hunter that the young Jedis may or may not have under control.

=== Book 10: Jedi Bounty ===
Having been convinced by his friend Raaba that Humans had never atoned for the atrocities committed against aliens under the Empire, the Wookiee Lowbacca goes to Ryloth to join the anti-Human Diversity Alliance.

Meanwhile, at the Jedi Praxeum, his fellow Jedi trainees Jacen, Jaina, Raynar Thul and Tenel Ka travel to Ryloth to discover the Diversity Alliance's true purpose. There, they discover that the Diversity Alliance is preparing to launch a war on the Human species. However, they are captured and are sent to work in the ryll mines. Lowbacca had never been told about their presence though when he found out, the Wookiee turned against the Diversity Alliance and helped them to escape the planet. But will they be able to convince the New Republic to take action against the Diversity Alliance? Or will they not?

=== Book 11: The Emperor's Plague ===
Zekk and Raynar find and rescue Raynar's father Bornan Thul. He is in the crossfire of two bounty hunters. Boba Fett slices into the Bornan's navicomputer because Bornan had been to the Emperor's Storehouse 5 days earlier. The other bounty hunter boards Bornan's ship after he had escaped in an escape pod. She is blown up when the ship self-destructs. As Zekk and Raynar rescue Bornan and his secret, Boba Fett fires on Zekk's ship, The Lightning Rod. Then Jaina, Jacen, Lowie, and Tenel Ka appear out of hyperspace and fire on Slave IV. As Boba already had the info he needed, he fled towards Ryloth to give Nolaa Tarkona the location of the Emperor's Plague. Tenel Ka's Hapan ship, Rock Dragon had followed Zekk despite his plea to Jaina not to follow. But he was grateful. They make it back to Coruscant to explain there adventures. Then they tell the Senate of the Diversity Alliance. Meanwhile, on Ryloth, the evil Twi'lek Diversity Alliance leader, Nolaa Tarkona, had paid Boba Fett for the info he had sliced out of Bornan's ship. The Senate is skeptical of the Young Jedi Knights' stories. So, Leia organizes an investigation of the Diversity Alliance. Luke, Lowie's sister Sirra, a Sentaur companion of the young Jedi Knights' named Lusa, and some senators as well as Kur, an exiled Twi'lek rescued by the Jedi Knights on Ryloth were sent to investigate. Meanwhile, the young Jedi Knights had left with Bornan Thul to visit the Imperial Storehouse. While there they decide to destroy it. They send an encrypted message to Raynar's mom requesting help. As the young Jedi plant explosives, the Diversity Alliance shows up with a small armada. The rest of them as well as a general of Nolaa's had been left behind to handle Luke and his investigators. Then, General Solo shows up with a New Republic fleet and begins to battle the Diversity Alliance in space over the asteroid. Nolaa and guards are already on the asteroid while Lowie's close friend and Diversity Alliance member Raaba leads the armada against the New Republic. The investigators find nothing unusual on Ryloth. But then Sirra exposes a "food crate" that stored blaster ammo. They engage in a battle until Kur calms them and takes over Ryloth's government. The Diversity Alliance realizes they were wrong and join Kur. At the asteroid the Jedi have set explosives. Lowie battles and kills Corsk, the Trandoshan general that he had injured on Ryloth while attempting to flee. Then, Bornan attempts to kill Nolaa. Her guards shoot and miss releasing several other plagues targeting various species including Twi'leks as well as the human attacking plague. Bornan dies in the plague chamber, assuring a worried Raynar that he was proud of him. IG-88 appears having been reprogrammed to protect Bornan. He protects Raynar but unable to avoid programming turns toward Bornan but is destroyed. Zekk, Lowie, and Raynar attempt to flee in the Lighting Rod as their companions had already left in the Rock Dragon. But some of Nolaa's guards stop them. Then Boba Fett appears. Having been paid by Raynar's uncle Tyko Thul to save them. The Diversity Alliance soldiers cheer thinking that he is there to help them but he turns around and kills them. He leaves in Slave IV while the others make it out in the Lightning Rod. Raaba had taken her ship the Rising Star down to rescue Nolaa. They escape. The asteroid begins to explode but Nolaa got her samples. But she is sick and Raaba had caught the Wookie plague. They realize they have lost. Even though the Diversity Alliance attempted to charge General Solo's ships, Aryn Dro Thul and Tyko Thul appeared out of hyperspace with the Bornaryn Fleet to aid the New Republic. Raaba flees to a barren planet. Nolaa dies. Raaba buries her and the plague. Raaba heals. She had sent Lowie a message saying that if she survived, she would find him. The Diversity Alliance is defeated and the young Jedi Knights return to Yavin 4 after healing on Coruscant for a celebration on the jungle moon. Raynar has constructed a pewter lightsaber. Lusa, having always been Force sensitive join Luke's Praxeum to study to become a Jedi. Zekk also join Luke's school. Tenel Ka kisses Jacen as the book ends with them all laughing and talking of the future.

=== Book 12: Return to Ord Mantell ===
Han Solo's past is about to catch up with him. When he and the twins take the Millennium Falcon to Ord Mantell for a high-speed race, they meet a battle-hungry young woman wielding a light saber. Her name is Anja Gallandro, and she knows more about Han's history than he likes. But Anja Gallandro guards an even more devastating secret, a secret that could mean disaster for the entire Solo family...

=== Book 13: Trouble on Cloud City ===
Jacen and Jaina believe they are simply off to enjoy a vacation at Lando Calrissian's Cloud City. Unfortunately, the friend they bring with, Anja, has plans that will cause much trouble for everyone.

=== Book 14: Crisis at Crystal Reef ===
Anja, furthering her plan to harm the Solo family, steals a star ship and races off toward Kessel. The young Jedi Knights follow, but are they following her into a trap they will not be able to escape?
