= Sith Academy =

Sith Academy could refer to these fictional academies associated with the Sith in the Star Wars universe:

- Shadow Academy, in the Young Jedi Knights books
- Trayus Academy in the Star Wars Knights of the Old Republic II: The Sith Lords video game
- Sith Academy on Korriban destroyed by Revan in the Star Wars Knights of the Old Republic video games
