= Clara de la Rocha =

Mexican revolutionary

Clara de la Rocha was a Mexican revolutionary, daughter of Herculano de la Rocha, a revolutionary hero from northwestern Mexico.

== Life ==
Clara's family was established in Durango and Sinaloa. She was born in Durango in 1890. In 1910, she joined the Maderista revolutionary army together with her father, General Herculano de la Rocha. She fought in the violent takeover of the city of Culiacán, Sinaloa in 1911. She participated in the attack led by her father to take the Sinaloa Mint and in the battle for the Sanctuary of the Sacred Heart of Jesus church, where the revolutionaries combined forces and achieved the surrender of the Federal Army troops defending it. During the Revolution, she was named guerrilla commander and later colonel.

== Activities ==
During the fight for the taking of Culiacán, Sinaloa, in 1911, Clara de La Rocha fought alongside her father, General Herculano de la Rocha (a wealthy farmer who had properties in the Los Algodones area, Sinaloa).

Clara, with her positive ambition, intimidated the federals. Both father and daughter, in a heroic act, protected themselves from the bullets under the arches of the old Cañedo Bridge over the Tamazula River, and shot down every federal who dared to expose his head. Clara later collaborated with her father, Herculano de la Rocha, in the attack to take control of the Sinaloa Mint, located on Rosales Street in Culiacán, Sinaloa, with success, largely thanks to the enormous cunning of Herculano who, with intelligence, knew how to defeat the federals and take control of the Sinaloa Mint.

Clara also participated in another very important combat in which the revolutionary forces achieved victory and the federal troops, stationed in the block currently located between Ángel Flores street and Donato Guerra avenue, had to surrender. The main building in the area was the church of the shrine of the Sacred Heart of Jesus, located in the historic center of Culiacán, Sinaloa. In that combat she pushed the federals into a corner who, at the beginning, fired several shots at the revolutionaries; then the revolutionaries answered the fire, defended themselves with everything they had available and fired a tremendous barrage of shots at the federals that forced them to retreat.

The surviving federals realized that they had been overtaken by the fury of the Sinaloan revolutionaries and that they could no longer do anything to control the situation. The retreating federals hid themselves on the roof of the Sanctuary church while the revolutionaries were waiting for them to come down, the revolutionaries were very angry of federals attack and wanted to catch them at any cost. They sent one last message to the feds to surrender. Feds could not escape and had no choice but to get off the roof and surrender to the revolutionaries. Clara achieved the rank of Colonel in the revolutionary movement.

Her presence fades in the revolutionary process, showing the difficulties that exist for a woman to participate in a world in which their merits are not recognized. She became part of popular legend, although nothing is recorded that speaks of her exploits in combat and, above all, of the way she embarrassed men by competing with them in marksmanship tournaments that she frequently won.

The inscription of Clara's tomb in the Civil Pantheon of the city of Culiacán reads: CLARA DE LA ROCHA. REVOLUTIONARY COLONEL OF 1910 WITH ALL THE LOVE OF HER CHILDREN from her ENRIQUE AND ROSA. REST IN PEACE. CULIACAN SIN. JUNE 1, 1970. (Source: Rosendo Romero Guzmán)

This tradition has continued by the Tenochca women, Pupualtzin, Catalina de Erauso, María Paula de Los Santos, Josefa Ortiz de Domínguez, Manuela Medina and Leona Vicario, the women of the La Merced Market and those of Juchitán

== In popular culture ==
Clara de la Rocha was the inspiration for Princess Leia's hairstyle in the 1977 film Star Wars.
