= Skywalker family =

Fictional family in the Star Wars series

The Skywalker family
- Star Wars family
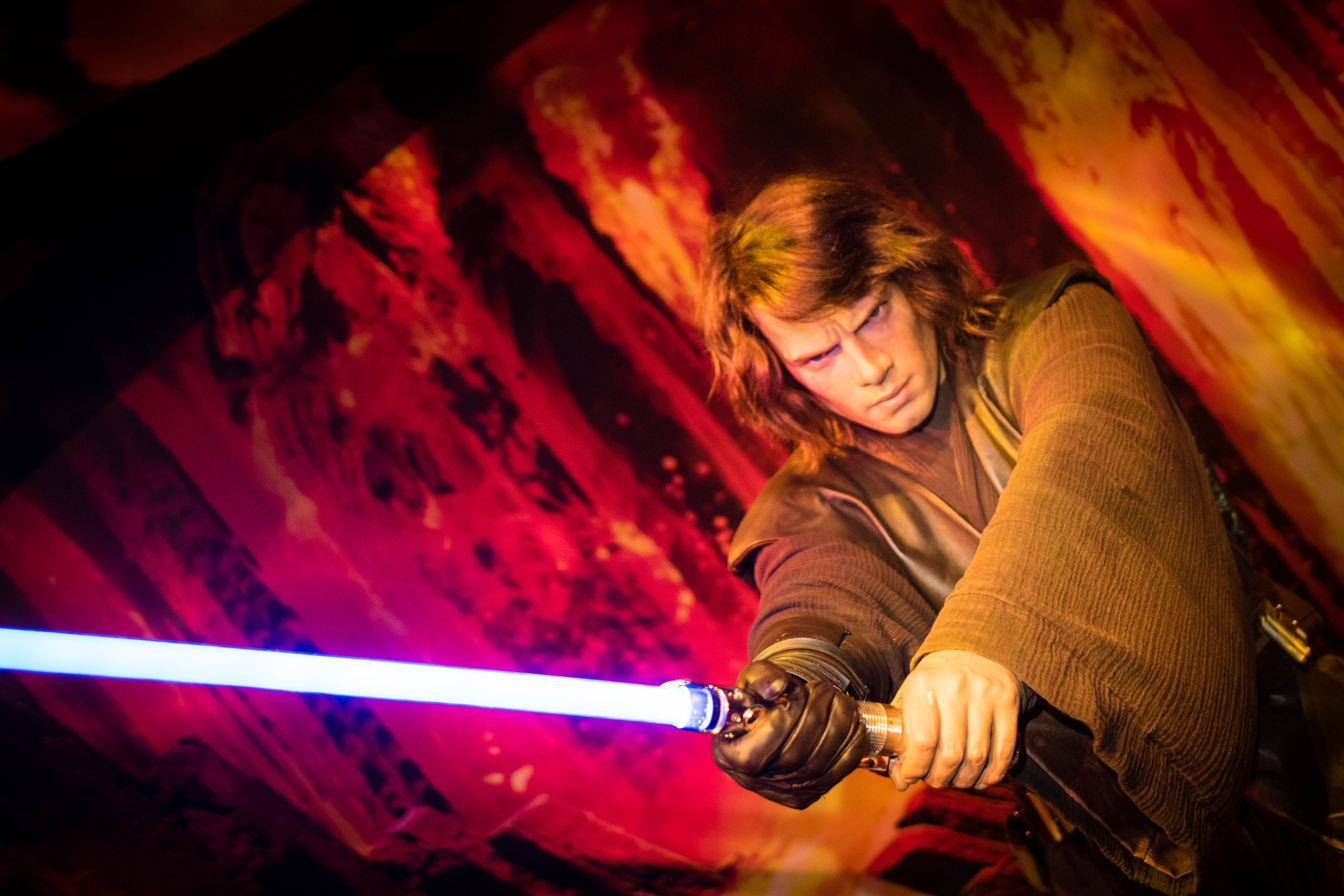
- Wax figure of Hayden Christensen as Anakin Skywalker (also known as Darth Vader) in 2012
- First appearance: Star Wars: A New Hope (1977)
- Created by: George Lucas

The Skywalker family is a fictional human (Jedi) family in the Star Wars franchise. Within the series' fictional universe, the Skywalkers are presented as a bloodline with strong inherent capabilities related to the Force and sometimes lightsaber skills. Luke Skywalker, his twin sister Princess Leia Organa, and their father, Darth Vader, are central characters in the original Star Wars film trilogy. Darth Vader, in his previous identity as Anakin Skywalker, is a lead character in the prequel film trilogy and so is his wife and the twins' mother, Padmé Amidala; while his mother, Shmi, is a minor character in the first and second films. Leia and Han Solo's son, Ben Solo, renamed himself Kylo Ren and is the main antagonist in the sequel film trilogy; while they and Luke serve as supporting characters. Shmi, Padmé, and Han are the only members who are not Force-sensitive due to them joining through marriage. Despite Rey not being connected to the bloodline, she chose to adopt the surname of Skywalker in Star Wars: The Rise of Skywalker. The Skywalker bloodline, alongside the Palpatine bloodline, are the two bloodlines that are the strongest with the Force.

== History ==
In terms of the series' internal chronology, the Skywalkers first appeared in the 1999 film Star Wars: Episode I – The Phantom Menace. In this film, Jedi Master Qui-Gon Jinn discovers Shmi Skywalker and her son, Anakin, as slaves on the planet Tatooine. Shmi informs Qui-Gon that Anakin has no father, leading Qui-Gon to suggest that Anakin is a product of midi-chlorians (Force-imparting microorganisms). As the film progresses, Anakin leaves Tatooine to begin his Jedi training.

Star Wars: Episode II – Attack of the Clones (2002) reveals that, in Anakin's absence, Shmi has married Cliegg Lars, becoming the stepmother of Owen. Shmi later dies after being kidnapped and taken away by Tusken Raiders. Owen tells Anakin they are stepbrothers and later marries Beru Whitesun. Anakin secretly marries Naboo Senator Padmé Amidala at the end of the film.

In Star Wars: Episode III – Revenge of the Sith (2005), Padme dies giving birth to twins, Luke and Leia. Luke is raised by Beru and Owen Lars on Tatooine. Leia is raised by Senator Bail Organa and Queen Breha Organa on Alderaan. Anakin, who has since become the Sith Lord Darth Vader, is unaware of his children's birth. The twins soon became part of the Rebel Alliance following the deaths of their adoptive families at the hands of the Empire. Neither of the twins know of their relation until the events of Star Wars: Episode VI – Return of the Jedi (1983).

The Solo family is part of the Skywalker family. In the 2018 spin-off film Solo: A Star Wars Story (set between Episode III and 1977's Episode IV – A New Hope), orphan Han Solo steals to survive on the planet Corellia. The last-name "Solo" is given to him by an Imperial Officer in his application to join the Imperial Flight Academy. Since the last-name of Han's father is unknown, Han would be the first Solo. Han would later be involved in the war against the Empire, forming a romantic relationship with Leia. Eventually, Han, Anakin (who has now reformed), Luke, and Leia succeeded in putting an end to the Empire's reign of terror, but this came at a cost of Anakin's life. In the 2015 film Star Wars: Episode VII – The Force Awakens, it is revealed that Han had a son named Ben with Leia. The family breaks apart following Ben's descent into the dark side as Kylo Ren, with Leia and Han separating. Luke is not revealed to have any children.

By the end of Star Wars: Episode IX – The Rise of Skywalker (2019), the Skywalker bloodline has died out, as Han is killed by Kylo Ren after he tries to convince him to return to the light side, Luke sacrifices himself to save the Resistance from the First Order, Leia dies to bring her son back to the light side, and Ben Solo dies to save Rey. Later, Rey adopts "Skywalker" as her surname to honor the Skywalker family and continue their legacy while cutting ties with her Palpatine lineage, making her the last known person alive to carry this surname. Since then, the Skywalkers have become legendary and famous throughout galactic history and for restoring peace to the galaxy.

== Family tree ==
Skywalker family tree

Aika Lars (Note: Appears in Pablo Hidalgo's Star Wars Character Encyclopedia: Updated and Expanded (2016))
Beru Whitesun

Cliegg Lars
Owen Lars

Shmi Skywalker-Lars
Anakin Skywalker; Darth Vader
Luke Skywalker

Jobal Naberrie (Note: Attack of the Clones (2002) and Revenge of the Sith (2005))	Ruwee Naberrie
Padmé Amidala	Bail Organa
Leia Organa	Han Solo
Ben Solo; Kylo Ren

House of Organa
Breha Organa

== Members ==
=== Shmi Skywalker-Lars ===
Shmi Skywalker (portrayed by Pernilla August) is the mother of Anakin Skywalker, the mother-in-law of Padmé Amidala, the paternal grandmother of Luke Skywalker and Leia Organa, the grandmother-in-law of Han Solo, and the maternal great-grandmother of Ben Solo. She appears in Star Wars: Episode I – The Phantom Menace and Star Wars: Episode II – Attack of the Clones.

Shmi was captured by pirates as a child alongside her parents, and was sold to the Hutts. In a bet, Gardulla the Hutt lost Shmi to Watto.

In The Phantom Menace, she and her son are introduced as slaves of the junk merchant Watto on the desert world Tatooine. Unlike her son, she is not Force-sensitive. She welcomes Jedi Master Qui-Gon Jinn (Liam Neeson) into their home, and tells him that Anakin (Jake Lloyd) has no father; she simply became pregnant with him. In spite of her poverty, Shmi tries to give Anakin a good home in the slave quarter of Mos Espa. Qui-Gon helps Anakin win his freedom, but cannot get Shmi out of slavery (since Watto wasn't willing to give up two slaves). She allows Anakin to leave with Qui-Gon, assuring her heartbroken son that they will meet again.

In Attack of the Clones, Anakin (Hayden Christensen), now a young adult Jedi apprentice, senses through the Force that she is in pain. He travels to Tatooine to find her, and, upon arriving, learns that she had been freed by and married a moisture farmer named Cliegg Lars (Jack Thompson), but had recently been kidnapped by Tusken Raiders. He finds her inside one of their encampments, but he arrives too late—beaten and tortured beyond help, she dies in his arms. Heartbroken and enraged by the loss of his mother, Anakin slaughters every single Tusken in the camp, including the women and children. Shmi's death ignites a strong anger in Anakin, and sets him on the path to becoming Darth Vader. Anakin later brings Shmi's body back to the Lars' homestead, where she is given a burial.

=== Anakin Skywalker ===
Anakin Skywalker is the son of Shmi Skywalker, the secret husband of Padmé Amidala, the father of Luke Skywalker and Leia Organa, the father-in-law of Han Solo, and the maternal grandfather of Ben Solo. Anakin is discovered on Tatooine by Jedi Master Qui-Gon Jinn who is sure that the boy is the "Chosen One" of Jedi Prophecy, who will bring balance to the Force. After the death of Qui-Gon, he becomes the Padawan of Obi-Wan Kenobi. He also forms a close bond with Padmé Amidala, the young senator of Naboo. The newly elected Chancellor of the Galactic Republic, Palpatine, also befriends Anakin, promising to watch the boy's progress "with great interest" and advise him. Torn between his loyalty to the Jedi and his drive for power, Anakin succumbs to temptation and becomes Darth Vader. As Vader, Anakin spends the following decades serving under Palpatine's Galactic Empire until reuniting with his son, Luke, redeeming himself by defeating his master to protect him (therefore, fulfilling his role as the Chosen One) while sacrificing himself in the process and becoming one with the Force.

Anakin Skywalker is played by Sebastian Shaw in Return of the Jedi (1983), and his younger self is played by Jake Lloyd in The Phantom Menace (1999) and Hayden Christensen in Attack of the Clones (2002) and Revenge of the Sith (2005).

=== Padmé Amidala ===
Padmé Amidala (portrayed by Natalie Portman) is married to Anakin Skywalker, the mother of Luke Skywalker and Leia Organa, the daughter-in-law of Shmi Skywalker, the mother-in-law of Han Solo, and the maternal grandmother of Ben Solo. She served as Queen of Naboo, and later as a Senator for her planet. She does not use the Force like most members of the Skywalker family. Her closest friend in the Senate was Senator Bail Organa. She reconnected and fell in love with Anakin Skywalker after he was assigned to protect her from an assassination attempt, and secretly married him shortly after the Battle of Geonosis. Three years later, she reveals to Anakin that she is pregnant and plans to raise their child on Naboo. She realizes that Anakin has started to have nightmares of her dying in childbirth and assures him that it was just a dream and that it won't happen. After Anakin turned to the dark side and massacred the Jedi at the Jedi Temple, she was told by Anakin that the Jedi had taken over the Republic. Obi-Wan arrives and asks Padmé about her husband's whereabouts and informs her that he has turned to the dark side. Padmé accuses Obi-Wan of lying and doesn't believe that Anakin would kill younglings. Obi-Wan states that Anakin is the father of Padmé's child and sets off to find him. Padmé tracks Anakin, now Darth Vader, to Mustafar and tries to persuade him to abandon the dark side, but Anakin refuses, and Force chokes her unconscious when Obi-Wan arrives. Padmé gives birth to her children shortly after the first Empire Day, whom she calls Luke and Leia. Padmé tells Obi-Wan that she believes there is still good left in Anakin, before dying. She was given a state funeral on her home planet of Naboo. Obi-Wan and Yoda decided to separate the children to keep them hidden from Darth Vader.

=== Luke Skywalker ===
Luke Skywalker (portrayed by Mark Hamill) is the older twin brother of Leia Organa, the brother-in-law of Han Solo, the uncle of Ben Solo, the son of Anakin Skywalker and Padmé Amidala, and the grandson of Shmi Skywalker. He is taken in by his uncle and aunt, Owen and Beru Lars, after the death of Padmé and Anakin's fall to the dark side. He is Force-sensitive and skilled with a lightsaber. In Return of the Jedi, a dying Yoda confirms to Luke, that Darth Vader (formerly Anakin Skywalker) is actually his father, despite Luke's belief that Vader's claim to fatherhood in The Empire Strikes Back was a ruse to pull Luke to the dark side. He also finds out from Obi-Wan's Force spirit that Princess Leia Organa is his sister. In The Force Awakens, as the last known Jedi, Luke is in hiding after failing to prevent his nephew and apprentice Ben Solo (now Kylo Ren) from turning to the dark side to join Supreme Leader Snoke and has cut himself off from the Force. In The Last Jedi, a young scavenger named Rey has located Luke and tries to convince him to show her the ways of the Force, but he refuses. After knowing the death of Han Solo, he trains Rey about how to use the Force and to become a Jedi. Luke reveals to Rey that he sensed the dark side in Ben and was scared for him, but Ben retaliated by using the Force to collapse the hut, burying him underneath. When he refuses to help Rey turn Ben back to the light, Luke plans to burn the Jedi Library tree and is greeted by Yoda, who convinces him to help Rey and not to mourn his failure of losing Ben to Snoke. On the planet Crait, Luke appears with his old lightsaber and duels Ben, who tries to attack Luke, but he dodges him. Luke tries to reason with Ben and then disappears, revealing that he was still on the island and that Ben was dueling a Force projection of him. Luke falls to the ground and gets up, and afterwards dies after disappearing, becoming one with the Force.

=== Leia Organa ===
Leia Organa (portrayed by Carrie Fisher) is married to Han Solo, the mother of Ben Solo, the younger twin sister of Luke Skywalker, the daughter of Anakin Skywalker and Padmé Amidala, and the granddaughter of Shmi Skywalker, raised by Bail and Breha Organa of Alderaan. At age 19, she is the Princess of Alderaan, and is captured by Darth Vader while in the Tantive IV blockade runner on a so-called "diplomatic mission". Leia is shown to be Force-sensitive. In The Empire Strikes Back, Leia professes her love for Han Solo when he is put into carbonite stasis, although it is originally Han and Luke who compete for her affections. In Return of the Jedi, planning to feed Luke, Han, and Chewbacca to the flesh eating Sarlacc, Jabba the Hutt is instead strangled to death by Leia by a chain he has on her. She later becomes involved in the Battle of Endor. In the years that follow, she becomes General Organa, the leader of the Resistance, a military organization unofficially backed by the New Republic to counter the First Order. She married Han Solo and had a son named Ben Solo, later Kylo Ren, whose turning to the dark side separated the couple before the events of The Force Awakens. Leia has been on a search to find her missing brother Luke and find a way to save her son from the dark side. She dies spending her energy trying to reach Ben, which helps him come back to the light side. Her body later disappears and she becomes one with the Force.

=== Han Solo ===
Han Solo (portrayed by Harrison Ford) is married to Leia Organa, the brother-in-law of Luke Skywalker, the father of Ben Solo, the son-in-law of Anakin Skywalker and Padmé Amidala, and the grandson-in-law of Shmi Skywalker. Like Shmi and Padmé, he is not Force-sensitive. The anthology film Solo: A Star Wars Story reveals that Han Solo's father constructed ships on the planet Corellia, where Han was born. The name of Han's father is not known. Han's surname, Solo, was not his birth name, with Han being given his Solo surname by an Imperial officer right before Han joined the Imperial flight academy, which he would leave three years after. Han Solo's first film appearance however was in 1977's Star Wars: A New Hope where he is played by Harrison Ford. He and his Wookiee co-pilot and best friend, Chewbacca, are initially hired to transport Luke Skywalker and Obi-Wan Kenobi. Han and Chewbacca later become involved in the Rebel Alliance and are committed to its cause. Over the course of the franchise, Han becomes a military leader for the Alliance, falling in love with and marrying Leia Organa, with whom he has a son named Ben. He is killed by Ben, who has become Kylo Ren, after failing to convince his son to turn from the dark side.

=== Ben Solo ===
Ben Solo (portrayed by Adam Driver) is the son of Leia Organa and Han Solo, the nephew of Luke Skywalker, the grandson of Anakin Skywalker and Padmé Amidala, and the great-grandson of Shmi Skywalker. He initially trains to be a Jedi under his uncle, Luke. Soon, Luke suspects Ben has been influenced by Snoke, and ignites his lightsaber because of instinct in an attempt to kill Ben in his sleep to prevent him from causing destruction. But when he thinks about killing Ben, Ben wakes up and this causes Ben to fall to the dark side. Ben becomes Kylo Ren, working for the First Order and working under the influence of Snoke. He also forms an uneasy alliance with General Hux. Ren is obsessed with the legacy of his grandfather, the Sith Lord Darth Vader, and aspires to finish what Vader started: the elimination of the Jedi. He stabs Han Solo, his father, in the heart but spares his mother when ordered to destroy her ship. Ben becoming Kylo Ren also caused Han and Leia to break up, but neither of them stopped loving their son. Luke confronts him and also disappears trying to stop Ben's actions. Kylo also meets Rey, a strong Force-sensitive with whom he has a connection called 'dyad in the Force', and he develops a romantic relationship with her despite the two being enemies at first. After his mother's death, Rey saves his life and admits to him she does want to join him as Ben Solo; he then sees a vision of his father and decides to come back to the light side, becoming Ben Solo again. Later, he sacrifices himself to bring Rey back to life, and shares a kiss with her before vanishing into the Force as the last of the Skywalker bloodline.

=== Extended family of the Skywalkers ===
==== Padmé Amidala's family ====
Name	Portrayal	Description
Ruwee Naberrie	Graeme Blundell (Attack of the Clones and Revenge of the Sith)	Padmé Amidala's father.
Jobal Naberrie	Trisha Noble (Attack of the Clones and Revenge of the Sith)	Padmé Amidala's mother.
Sola Naberrie	Claudia Karvan (Attack of the Clones and Revenge of the Sith)	Padmé Amidala's older sister, the mother of Ryoo and Pooja Naberrie.
Ryoo Naberrie	Keira Wingate (Attack of the Clones and Revenge of the Sith)	Oldest daughter of Sola Naberrie, niece of Padmé Amidala, older sister of Pooja, and cousin of Luke Skywalker and Leia Organa.
Pooja Naberrie	Hayley Mooy (Attack of the Clones and Revenge of the Sith)	Youngest daughter of Sola Naberrie, niece of Padmé Amidala, younger sister of Ryoo, and cousin of Luke Skywalker and Leia Organa. She replaces Jar Jar Binks as Senator of the Chommell Sector.

==== Lars family (Anakin's step-father, step-brother, and Luke's step-family) ====
Name	Portrayal	Description
Cliegg Lars	Jack Thompson (Attack of the Clones)	Moisture farmer who purchases, then frees and marries, Shmi Skywalker, becoming the stepfather of Anakin Skywalker, whom he meets only briefly in Attack of the Clones. He loses his leg when pursuing the Sand People who had kidnapped Shmi. The name Cliegg, and variations of it, have been in Star Wars drafts since 1974.
Owen Lars	Phil Brown (A New Hope), Joel Edgerton (Attack of the Clones, Revenge of the Sith, and Obi-Wan Kenobi)	Step-uncle and surrogate parent of Luke Skywalker in A New Hope, Owen and his wife, Beru, are killed by stormtroopers at their home on Tatooine. In the prequel films, Owen is the son of Cliegg Lars and stepbrother of Anakin Skywalker. He and his wife Beru take custody of Luke at the end of Revenge of the Sith. Before the prequel trilogy released, the Return of the Jedi novelization includes a detail about Owen Lars being Obi-Wan Kenobi's estranged brother (rather than the son of a previous marriage, of the man who married Anakin's mother). To explain subsequent references, awkwardly referred to a character called "Owen Kenobi", a personification of the bond Kenobi feels toward Owen Lars, in Star Wars: Lone Wolf: A Tale of Obi-Wan and Luke. Before the plot-line was discarded by the prequel trilogy.
Beru Whitesun Lars	Shelagh Fraser (A New Hope), Bonnie Piesse (Attack of the Clones and Revenge of the Sith)	Step-aunt and surrogate parent to Luke Skywalker in A New Hope, she and her husband Owen are killed by stormtroopers at their home on Tatooine. In the prequel films, Beru is Owen's girlfriend in Attack of the Clones then wife in Revenge of the Sith, and the two take custody of the infant Luke at the end of the latter film.

==== Organa family (Leia's adoptive family) ====
Name	Portrayal	Description
Bail Organa	Jimmy Smits (Attack of the Clones, Revenge of the Sith, Rogue One, and Obi-Wan Kenobi); Voice: Phil LaMarr (The Clone Wars and Rebels) Benjamin Bratt (Andor Season 2 - recast due to scheduling conflicts preventing Smits from participating)	Leia Organa's adoptive father, the Senator of Alderaan and one of the Rebel Alliance's founding members. He adopts Leia after her birth mother, Padmé, dies and her birth father, Anakin Skywalker, turns to the dark side in Revenge of the Sith. Bail is killed in the destruction of Alderaan by the Death Star in A New Hope. He first appeared in Attack of the Clones, portrayed by Jimmy Smits, though he appeared in scenes cut from The Phantom Menace, where he was portrayed by Adrian Dunbar.
Queen Breha Organa	Rebecca Jackson Mendoza (Revenge of the Sith) Simone Kessell (Obi-Wan Kenobi)	Ruler of Alderaan, wife of Bail Organa, and adoptive mother of Leia Organa. She is killed in the destruction of Alderaan. Breha is also featured in the short story "Eclipse" and in the 2017 novel Leia, Princess of Alderaan.

== Legends ==
The following characters are exclusive to what is now retroactively known as the Legends brand since April 2014, and non-canonical to any and all Star Wars material produced under the ownership of the Walt Disney Company. With the 2012 acquisition of Lucasfilm by The Walt Disney Company, most of the licensed Star Wars Expanded Universe material produced since the originating 1977 film Star Wars was rebranded as Star Wars Legends and declared non-canon to the franchise in April 2014.

Following the events of the original film trilogy, Leia and Han marry and have children, and Luke does likewise several years after they do. The Skywalker bloodline branches from Luke and Leia's descendants, but only Luke's side continues to carry the Skywalker name.

Leia and Han marry in The Courtship of Princess Leia (1994) by Dave Wolverton. Leia is pregnant with twins in Timothy Zahn's Heir to the Empire (1991) and they are born in Zahn's The Last Command (1993). Han and Leia have another child by the time of the Jedi Academy trilogy (1994) by Kevin J. Anderson, by which time Leia has become the Chief of State of the New Republic. All three of the Solo children become Jedi Knights under the tutelage of their maternal uncle Luke Skywalker. The Solo children were ranked as the 16th top Star Wars heroes, according to IGN in 2008.

Having refounded the Jedi Order and trained several new Jedi including Leia, Luke eventually marries an enemy-turned-ally Mara Jade, and they have a son named Ben, who was voted the 40th top Star Wars character by IGN and the 6th top Star Wars Expanded Universe character by UGO Networks.

Legends Skywalker family tree

Aika Lars	Cliegg Lars	Shmi Skywalker-Lars	Ruwee Naberrie	Jobal Naberrie
Beru Whitesun Lars	Owen Lars	Anakin Skywalker; Darth Vader	Padmé Amidala Naberrie	Bail Prestor Organa	Breha Antilles Organa	Jagged Antilles	Zena Antilles
Ta'a Chume
Luke Skywalker	Mara Jade Skywalker	Han Solo	Leia Organa Solo	Teneniel Djo	Prince Isolder	Baron Soontir Fel	Syal Antilles Fel; Wynssa Starflare	Iella Wessiri Antilles
Vestara Khai	Ben Skywalker	Anakin Solo	Jacen Solo; Darth Caedus	Tenel Ka; Djo	Jaina Solo Fel	Emperor Jagged Fel	Syal Antilles
Unnamed Skywalker	Unnamed Wife	Unnamed Husband	Allana; Djo Solo; Amelia Solo (Note: Identity hidden, and adopted by Han and Leia as "Amelia".)	Emperor Fel II	Fel Empress
Droo Rawk (Note: Surname adopted later.)	Nat Skywalker; Bantha Rawk	Kol Skywalker	Moff; Morrigan Corde; Nyna Calixte	Empress Elliah Fel	Emperor Roan Fel
Ahnah Rawk	Skeeto Rawk	Micah Rawk	Cade Skywalker	Ania Solo	Empress Marasiah Fel	Antares Draco

Nejaa Halcyon	Scerra Horn
Booster Terrik	Valin "Hal" Horn (née Halcyon)	Nyche Horn
Wedge Antilles	Mirax Terrik	Corran Horn
Myri Antilles	Valin Horn	Jysella Horn

=== Mara Jade ===
Mara Jade was created by Timothy Zahn as an antagonist for Heir to the Empire (1991), and she and Luke marry several years later in the comic miniseries Union (1999-2000). She joins his restored Jedi Order, and they have a son, Ben Skywalker, in the middle of the New Jedi Order series (1999-2003).

=== Jaina Solo ===
Jaina Solo

Jaina Solo is the eldest child of Han Solo and Leia Organa Solo, created by Timothy Zahn for the Thrawn trilogy of Star Wars expanded universe novels. Leia is pregnant with twins in Heir to the Empire (1991) and Jaina and her twin brother Jacen are born in The Last Command (1993). She has appeared in various novels and the Champions of the Force set for the Star Wars Miniatures game.

Jaina, named after Han's mother, is born five minutes before her brother Jacen in the Thrawn trilogy (1991–93), set about five years after Return of the Jedi. The twins, and eventually their younger brother, live at various safe havens for their first few years under the protection of Leia's handmaiden Winter. The twins play a small role in Kevin J. Anderson's Jedi Academy trilogy (1994). In Champions of the Force (1994), Jaina helps her brother defend their unconscious uncle from the spirit of Sith Lord Exar Kun. In Vonda McIntyre's The Crystal Star (1994), Jaina is kidnapped and used in a plot, along with her siblings, to take advantage of their Force powers. In the Corellian trilogy (1994), Jaina is again kidnapped but escapes. Jaina becomes a major character in Young Jedi Knights (1995) as Jaina and Jacen begin their Jedi training.

Throughout the New Jedi Order series (1999–2003), Jaina pursues a life separate from her twin brother and becomes Mara Jade Skywalker's apprentice. Jaina progresses quickly as a Jedi and a pilot, eventually joining Rogue Squadron. She also develops a romantic relationship with Jagged Fel. She briefly becomes the apprentice of fallen Jedi Kyp Durron. Jaina's understanding and manipulation of Yuuzhan Vong technology causes them to associate her with their trickster goddess. She is present at the conclusion of the war with the Yuuzhan Vong. Walter Jon Williams, author of Destiny's Way (2002), noted that the plot concerning Jaina's love life caused some frantic rewrites. Elaine Cunningham, author of the Dark Journey, commented that the story of the 2002 novel is a personal one focusing on a difficult time in Jaina's life.

In The Joiner King (2005), Jaina and the Jedi Zekk are joined in the Killik hive. Jacen tricks them into attacking a Chiss base to provoke a war between the Chiss and the Killiks; Jaina, furious, vows that she will never fly with Jacen again. In the Legacy of the Force series (2006–08), Jacen throws Jaina out of the Galactic Alliance when she refuses to follow his order to destroy a crippled ship. She senses at this time a growing darkness in her twin. In Betrayal (2006), Jacen falls to the dark side of the Force, and Jaina realizes her duty as the "Sword of the Jedi" requires her to stop him. She turns to Boba Fett to train her. In Invincible (2008), Jaina duels and kills Jacen.

In the Fate of the Jedi series (2009–12), Jaina is promoted to Jedi Master by Luke Skywalker, and marries Jagged Fel. Her and Jagged's descendants include Emperor Roan Fel and his daughter Marasiah Fel in the Legacy series (2006–14), set nearly 140 years after Return of the Jedi.

In 2017, Hasbro released a 6" Jaina figure as a part of its Black Series line.

=== Jacen Solo ===
Jacen Solo is the middle child of Han Solo and Leia Organa, Jacen was born five minutes after his twin sister Jaina, introduced in utero in the 1994 Star Wars expanded universe novel Heir to the Empire, and born and named in The Last Command. He is a major character in several Star Wars novels, particularly as the protagonist of The New Jedi Order series and later as the antagonist of the Legacy of the Force series, in which he becomes known as Darth Caedus.

IGN listed Jacen as #17 on their list of the top 100 Star Wars heroes, saying that he had a more "profound effect" than any other Solo children on the Star Wars setting. Jesse Schedeen, writing for IGN, also listed him as #5 in a reader-inspired list of top Star Wars villains, and named the character's murder of Mara Jade as his "defining moment of villainy". UGO.com listed Jacen as their top Star Wars expanded universe character, calling him "one of the most fearsome—and most tragic—villains in the Star Wars universe".

=== Anakin Solo ===
Anakin Solo is the youngest child born to Han Solo and Princess Leia, and the younger brother of Jacen and Jaina Solo. Anakin is named after his maternal grandfather, Anakin Skywalker, and, like his namesake, is a talented pilot who is prodigiously gifted both in the Force and mechanical engineering.

Anakin appears as an infant and toddler in many Star Wars novels such as the Jedi Academy trilogy (1994). Anakin and his siblings play central roles in other novels such as The Crystal Star (1994), the Corellian trilogy (1995) and The New Rebellion (1996). Anakin's birth is featured in Tom Veitch's Dark Empire II comic book miniseries (May 1995). He is first referred to as Han Solo, Jr. by his father, but Leia corrects him, having named the baby after her biological father, Anakin Skywalker, as a reminder of hope. However, Anakin still fears the name and his grandfather's legacy.

On October 1, 1995, Nancy Richardson started the Junior Jedi Knights series with The Golden Globe starring Anakin and his best friend Tahiri Veila. Anakin is now an eleven-year-old child starting his training at the Jedi Academy on Yavin 4. Richardson continued Anakin's adventures in the following two novels, Lyric's World and Promises, before Rebecca Moesta finished the series with Anakin's Quest, Vader's Fortress, and Kenobi's Blade, starting in 1996. Anakin appears in the Young Jedi Knights series by Kevin J. Anderson and Rebecca Moesta, which follows the adventures of Anakin's siblings, Jacen and Jaina.

In 1999, the first novel of the New Jedi Order series was published, entitled Vector Prime by R.A. Salvatore. Anakin is now a teenager, who often spends time alone thinking about the role of the Force, and would get into arguments with his brother Jacen on the ways of a Jedi and the Force. Anakin studies as a Jedi under his uncle, Luke Skywalker, who still sees his nephew as being too young and reckless. In the novel's climax, his father's copilot and best friend, Chewbacca, dies saving Anakin's life.

Anakin plays major roles in Dark Tide: Onslaught and Dark Tide: Ruin by Michael A. Stackpole published 1 February 2000 and 1 June 2000, respectively, and is the main focus of the books Edge of Victory: Conquest and Edge of Victory: Rebirth by Greg Keyes published April 1, 2001 and August 1, 2001, respectively.

In the 2001 novel Star by Star by Troy Denning, Anakin leads a team of Jedi to take out a dangerous enemy, resulting in his death. Writers of the New Jedi Order storyline revealed in a question-and-answer section of the paperback edition of The Unifying Force published on August 3, 2004 that Anakin was supposed to be the hero of the story and lead the Jedi Order, but this was changed due to the release of the Star Wars prequel films, in which the hero was also named Anakin. Instead, he dies in battle at the conclusion of the novel.

Even after his death, Anakin Solo has been mentioned several times in most following novels, including a possible appearance in Traitor by Matthew Stover, as a droid in Betrayal by Aaron Allston as Anakin Sal-Solo, and in Backlash, where he appeared to his maternal uncle Luke Skywalker and to Luke's son, Ben Skywalker by Aaron Allston.

Anakin is portrayed in the earlier books as being a genius and a loner, but is haunted by his name. In Lyric's World, it is revealed that he loves to take computers apart and put them back together and sees it as a puzzle. He would also have dreams of Emperor Palpatine and Darth Vader trying to persuade him to fall to the dark side of the Force; Anakin overcomes this fear in Anakin's Quest, in which he confronts himself.

=== Ben Skywalker ===
Luke Skywalker and Mara Jade Skywalker's son. Named after Obi-Wan "Ben" Kenobi, Jedi Knight. Former student of Jacen Solo, his cousin. He inherits his mother's red hair and his father's blue eyes. He is born during the New Jedi Order series (1999–2003). In Fate of the Jedi: Outcast, he voluntarily accompanies his father into exile. He proves himself as both a fighter and as an investigator to carry on his father's name. His love interest is Vestara Khai, formerly a Sith apprentice, then a Jedi apprentice. The character was voted the 40th top Star Wars character by IGN and the 6th top Star Wars Expanded Universe character by UGO Networks.

=== Allana Djo Solo ===
Allana Djo Solo is the daughter of Jacen Solo and Tenel Ka Djo, Jacen's fellow trainee at Luke's Jedi Academy. She is born during the Dark Nest trilogy of novels. In the Legacy of the Force series, Jacen becomes Darth Caedus partly to protect Allana from a dark fate which he foresees. Her death is faked and she is adopted by her grandparents under the false identity of "Amelia", a supposed war orphan. She lives and travels with them during the following series Fate of the Jedi. By the end of that series, her Jedi training is about to begin.

=== Roan and Marasiah Fel ===
In the Star Wars: Legacy comic series, set over 120 years after the original trilogy, some of Leia's descendants have since become the ruling dynasty of a reformed, more benevolent Empire. The first volume (2006-2010) recounts their struggles against a new Sith Order. Emperor Roan Fel is Leia's great-grandson, Jaina Solo's grandson and the head of the Imperial Knights (who split from the Jedi refounded by Luke, but are still opposed to the dark side). Marasiah Fel is his daughter and an imperial Knight herself. They oppose the new Sith Order who have taken over most of the galaxy, and ally with Cade Skywalker and the surviving Jedi and Republic forces in order to fight them.

=== Nat Skywalker ===
Nat Skywalker is a former Jedi Master in Star Wars: Legacy, a grandson of Ben Skywalker, older brother of Kol Skywalker and the uncle of Cade Skywalker. He took the name Bantha Rawk upon leaving the Jedi and works as a mechanic.

=== Kol Skywalker ===
Kol Skywalker is a character in Star Wars: Legacy. A Jedi Master, he is the younger brother of Nat Skywalker and a grandson of Ben Skywalker (they share the same red hair color, and has green eyes like Ben's mother Mara Jade), he is the father of Cade Skywalker.

=== Ania Solo ===
The second volume of Star Wars: Legacy (2013-2014) follows Ania Solo, the great-granddaughter of Leia and granddaughter of Jacen Solo. She is a junkyard trader who is embroiled in the continuing conflict between the new Sith and the Republic-Imperial alliance.

=== Cade Skywalker ===
Cade Skywalker is the descendant of Anakin Skywalker, Luke Skywalker, Mara Jade Skywalker and Ben Skywalker, the son of Kol Skywalker and the nephew of Nat Skywalker. He is a protagonist of the Star Wars: Legacy comic book series from Dark Horse, which takes place 125 years after Return of the Jedi. Cade has completely abandoned the Jedi way after an attack by the New Sith Order on the Jedi Academy on Ossus. Despite this, he still encounters other Jedi, as well as the ghost of his ancestor Luke Skywalker, and ultimately reclaims his heritage to fight the Sith. The character was voted the 84th top Star Wars character by IGN.
