= Star Wars: Ambush at Corellia =

1995 novel by Roger MacBride Allen

- Author: Roger MacBride Allen
- Cover artist: Drew Struzan
- Language: English
- Series: Star Wars Books, Star Wars Legends, The Corellian Trilogy
- Genre: Adventure; War; Science fiction; Espionage
- Publisher: Bantam Spectra
- Publication place: United States
- Pages: 308
- ISBN: 0553298038
- Followed by: Assault at Seliona, by Roger MacBride Allen

Star Wars: Ambush at Corellia is a novel written by Roger MacBride Allen in 1995. The book was published by Bantam Books under the imprint Spectra. Ambush at Corellia takes place in the Star Wars universe, in the Star Wars Legends canon, 14 years after the 1983 film Return of the Jedi.

== Plot summary ==
14 years after Return of the Jedi, a New Republic Intelligence agent comes to Han telling him that they have a hidden enemy and none of the spies for the New Republic have reported back from Corellia. The agent asks Han to fulfill a mission for the Republic. But when Han goes to his home planet Corellia, he learns that the system of Corellia, consisting of several planets, is on the brink of civil war. Suddenly, Han, Leia, and their children are in a very dangerous position. The only visible way out is to meet a rebel leader's impossible demands. And with no way to contact Luke Skywalker, Han and Leia are on their own.

=== Characters ===
- Han Solo
- Leia Organa
- Jacen Solo
- Jaina Solo
- Anakin Solo
- Chewbacca
- Luke Skywalker

== Publishing ==
Ambush at Corellia was published on February 2, 1995, by Bantam Books, under the imprint Bantam Spectra. According to the inside cover of the book, its paperback ISBN is 0553298038.

== Reception ==
The novel reached number eight on both Publishers Weekly's and USA Today's bestseller lists.

== See also ==
- List of Star Wars books
- Roger MacBride Allen
