= The Crystal Star =

1994 novel by Vonda McIntyre

- Author: Vonda N. McIntyre
- Cover artist: Drew Struzan
- Language: English
- Series: Canon C
- Subject: Star Wars
- Genre: Science fiction
- Publisher: Bantam Spectra
- Publication date: Hardcover: December 8, 1994; Paperback: December 4, 1995
- Publication place: United States
- Media type: Hardcover & Paperback
- Pages: Hardcover: 309; Paperback: 313
- ISBN: 0-553-57174-5
- Preceded by: Starfighters of Adumar
- Followed by: Before the Storm

The Crystal Star is a 1994 science fiction novel by American writer Vonda N. McIntyre. Set in the Star Wars universe, it was published by Bantam Spectra. The novel's story takes place ten years after the Battle of Endor in the Star Wars expanded universe.

== Plot ==
Jacen and Jaina Solo are now five years old, and their brother Anakin Solo is three, all at an age where they are easily manipulated.

On Munto Codro, Jacen, Jaina and Anakin are kidnapped by a man named Hethrir. Their mother Leia Organa Solo immediately dispatches a rescue operation. Meanwhile, Leia's husband Han Solo and brother Luke Skywalker go to Crseih Station on a supposed "vacation", and learn of a secret cult that influences the Crystal Star, which could possibly threaten the very existence of the galaxy.

Hethrir continues to manipulate the children for several days, as he leads the Empire Reborn, an organization looking to resurrect the Galactic Empire. Eventually, Leia and Chewbacca manage to rescue the children, but Hethrir is still connected to the events that transpire around the Crystal Star. After an intense series of events, Hethrir is killed, the Crystal Star explodes, Crseih station moves out of the area beforehand, and Luke, Leia, Han and the children are safe.

== Reception ==
The Crystal Star was a New York Times Bestseller, and the sixth consecutive Star Wars novel to reach the bestseller list.

Critical reception was generally hostile. It was dubbed "The most derided novel in the entire Expanded Universe" in a 2013 Gizmodo retrospective with criticized elements including recycled plot elements from other EU novels such as the Solo children being kidnapped and Luke losing his Force powers, as well as the novel's stranger aspects making little sense, such as centaurs and werewolves in a science-fiction settings and Luke joining Hethrir's "transparently evil" cult. In 2016, it was called the worst Star Wars book ever by Gizmodo. Game Rant wrote in 2023: "The Crystal Star is fascinating in all the ways it fails. The book is like a trainwreck." Publishers Weekly said: "While this is easily the best of a bestselling series [...], its flaws are still obvious."
