= Rebecca Moesta =

American writer

Rebecca Moesta Anderson
- Moesta at Dragon Con in 2026
- Born: November 17, 1956 (age 69); Heidelberg, West Germany
- Education: California State University, Los Angeles; Boston University
- Occupations: Novelist and short story writer
- Spouses: Thomas E. Cowan (m. 1980; div. 1990); Kevin J. Anderson (m. 1991)
- Children: 1
- Writing career
- Language: English
- Years active: 1992–present
- Genre: Science fiction
- Website: wordfire.com

Rebecca Moesta Anderson (born November 17, 1956) is an American writer and the author of several science fiction books.

== Early life ==
Rebecca Moesta Anderson was born in West Germany to American parents, and raised in Pasadena, California, where she lived until her early twenties. She graduated with a Bachelor of Liberal Arts from California State University, Los Angeles. Shortly after her graduation, she married a recently graduated physicist from nearby Caltech, becoming Rebecca Moesta Cowan.

In 1981, the couple moved to New Haven, Connecticut, where they lived for one year until they moved to Darmstadt, West Germany, living there until 1987. In West Germany, Moesta took graduate courses with Boston University and earned a Master of Science degree in Business Administration. During their stay in West Germany she gave birth to her son, Jonathan, before moving back to the United States and settling in Livermore, California.

== Career ==
In 1989, Moesta took a position at the Lawrence Livermore National Laboratory as a proofreader and copy editor. There she formed a science fiction club in which she met her future husband Kevin J. Anderson. She divorced her first husband in 1990 and married Anderson in 1991.

The couple started working together writing science fiction novels, and to date have written two Titan A.E. young adult novels, two high-tech pop-up books, and fourteen Star Wars expanded universe novels, the Young Jedi Knights series. The couple owns and runs the publishing company WordFire Press, and Moesta is currently working on several new projects, including copy editing her husband's works.

== Works ==
=== Star Wars ===
- Heirs of the Force (June 1995) (ISBN 0-425-16949-9)
- Shadow Academy (September 1995) (ISBN 0-425-17153-1)
- The Lost Ones (December 1995) (ISBN 0-425-16999-5)
- Lightsabers (February 1996) (ISBN 0-425-16951-0)
- Darkest Knight (May 1996) (ISBN 0-425-16950-2)
- Jedi Under Siege (August 1996) (ISBN 0-425-16633-3)
- Shards of Alderaan (December 1996) (ISBN 0-425-16952-9)
- Diversity Alliance (March 1997) (ISBN 0-425-16905-7)
- Junior Jedi Knights: Anakin's Quest (April 1997) (ISBN 0-425-16824-7)
- Delusions of Grandeur (June 1997) (ISBN 0-425-17061-6)
- Junior Jedi Knights: Vader's Fortress (July 1997) (ISBN 0-425-16956-1)
- Jedi Bounty (September 1997) (ISBN 0-425-17313-5)
- Junior Jedi Knights: Kenobi's Blade (October 1997) (ISBN 0-425-17315-1)
- The Emperor's Plague (December 1997) (ISBN 0-425-17314-3)
- Return to Ord Mantell (May 1998) (ISBN 0-425-16362-8)
- Trouble on Cloud City (August 1998) (ISBN 0-425-16416-0)
- Crisis at Crystal Reef (December 1998) (ISBN 0-425-16519-1)

=== Star Trek books ===
- Highest Score (1996). Co-written with Kevin J. Anderson, under the pseudonym Kem Antilles. Based on the Star Trek: Deep Space Nine television series, set in the year 2370.

=== Buffyverse ===
- Little Things (2002)

=== Crystal Doors series ===
- Book 1: The Island Realm (2006)
- Book 2: The Ocean Realm (June 2007)
- Book 3: Sky Realm (2008)
