= The Black Fleet Crisis =

Science fiction novel trilogy

- Before the Storm (1996); Shield of Lies (1996); Tyrant's Test (1997)
- Author: Michael P. Kube-McDowell
- Cover artist: Drew Struzan
- Country: United States
- Language: English
- Genre: Science fiction
- Publisher: Bantam Spectra
- Published: 1996 – 1997
- Media type: Paperback
- Preceded by: The Crystal Star
- Followed by: The New Rebellion

The Black Fleet Crisis is a trilogy of science fiction novels set in the Star Wars expanded universe. The books take place 16 years after Star Wars Episode IV: A New Hope. All three novels were authored by American writer Michael P. Kube-McDowell, and published by Bantam Books under the imprint Bantam Spectra between March 1996 and November 1998.

The books were:

- Before the Storm, published April 1, 1996
- Shield of Lies, published September 1, 1996
- Tyrant's Test, published January 1, 1997

== Plot ==
The outbreak of the Black Fleet Crisis ends a period of relative peace in the galaxy. While the war against the remnants of the Empire continued, the New Republic had pushed the Empire back enough to acquire some breathing room to attend to personal concerns. Yevethan forces (former Imperial slaves who overthrew their masters) using captured Imperial ships begin a genocidal campaign to conquer the Koornacht Cluster by killing all non-Yevethans. The New Republic is forced to fight in its own defense, as well as to rescue hostages held by the Yevethans (including Han Solo). After obtaining an image of Han as a battered hostage, Chewbacca goes on a desperate rescue mission.

Luke Skywalker travels with Akanah Norand Goss Pell to seek out what he's told are his mother's people, the Fallanassi, to learn about them. Luke finds that the Fallanassi are a mysterious and secretive sect of Force users who are total pacifists. Luke learns new Force techniques and philosophies from them, and gains their help to aid the New Republic in one battle.

Leia is the only person who doesn't have a chance to rest, who because of her fame, what others expect of her, and her sense of duty and obligation, she has become a prisoner of the Presidency. But she is far too tired, stressed beyond her limits, and emotionally fragile, and she is only two steps away from a serious personal crisis of her confidence. Nil Spaar, the Machiavellian Viceroy of the Yevethan Protectorate, sees that as an opportunity he can exploit and an opportunity to destroy the New Republic from within.

== See also ==
- List of Star Wars Books
