= The New Rebellion =

1996 novel by Kristine Kathryn Rusch

- Author: Kristine Kathryn Rusch
- Cover artist: Drew Struzan
- Language: English
- Series: Canon C
- Subject: Star Wars
- Genre: Science fiction
- Publisher: Bantam Spectra
- Publication date: Hardcover: December 1, 1996; Paperback: October 1, 1997
- Publication place: United States
- Media type: Hardcover & Paperback
- Pages: Hardcover: 383; Paperback: 532
- ISBN: 0-553-10093-9 (hardcover); ISBN 0-553-57414-0 (paperback)
- Preceded by: Tyrant's Test
- Followed by: Ambush at Corellia

The New Rebellion is a 1996 science fiction novel by American writer Kristine Kathryn Rusch, published by Bantam Spectra. The novel is set thirteen years after the Battle of Endor in the Star Wars expanded universe.

== Plot ==
Mass murder has always rattled the Force. In Star Wars Episode IV: A New Hope, Obi-Wan Kenobi experiences the suffering of the deaths of millions from the destruction of Alderaan. In The New Rebellion, Luke Skywalker will experience the same emotion.

Thirteen years after the Battle of Endor, the New Republic has defeated most of the Galactic Empire and many ex-Imperial star systems have joined the ranks. Moreover, corruption has spread throughout the ranks, which a series of antagonists are waiting to capitalize on.

Kueller, a Dark Jedi, destroys millions with his powers. Luke Skywalker feels this genocide, and is afraid that the destruction will continue. Meanwhile, an assassination attempt is made on Princess Leia Organa, which is blamed on Han Solo. However, this is quickly discovered to be Kueller's doing.

Luke decides to seek the aid of Brakiss, a former student. However, Brakiss is in on Kueller's plan, and Luke joins the spiral of death that is to follow. Eventually, Luke Skywalker is led to Kueller, though a wake of destruction is left behind.

== Reception ==
The New Rebellion was a New York Times' and a Wall Street Journal bestseller, like a majority of the Star Wars Bantam Spectra releases.

Publishers Weekly said that Rusch "moves her narrative briskly, but at the expense of clear plotting, crisp detail and character."

== Notes ==
1. Rusch biography. URL accessed on March 4, 2006.
