= The Dark Nest trilogy =

Trilogy of science fiction novels set in the Star Wars galaxy

- Cover of the first book
- 1. The Joiner King; 2. The Unseen Queen; 3. The Swarm War
- Author: Troy Denning
- Cover artist: Cliff Nielsen
- Country: United States
- Language: English
- Genre: Science fiction
- Publisher: Del Rey Books
- Published: 2005
- Media type: Print (Paperback)
- No. of books: 3
- OCLC: 77524287
- Preceded by: The New Jedi Order
- Followed by: Legacy of the Force

The Dark Nest trilogy is a trilogy of science-fiction novels set in the Star Wars galaxy 35–36 years after the Battle of Yavin depicted in the original Star Wars film. The series serves as a follow-up to the events of the New Jedi Order series of novels, and a precursor to the Legacy of the Force and Fate of the Jedi series of novels. The trilogy was written by Troy Denning. The first installment was released in July 2005 and the final installment was released in December of that same year. This series features heroes of the New Jedi Order.

== Plot synopses ==
=== The Joiner King ===
An insectoid species called the Killik have been expanding beyond their borders, encroaching on Chiss territory. All of the Jedi survivors of the mission to Myrkr in Star by Star, most notably those who were students at the Jedi Academy on Yavin 4 in the Young Jedi Knights series, are called through the Force to help, and they depart into the Unknown Regions of the Galaxy. The Chiss lodge a formal complaint, accusing the Jedi of interfering in their border dispute with the Killik. The Jedi find that their old friend Raynar Thul, who had been presumed dead after the events of Star by Star, had come upon the Killik and been absorbed into their hive mind as a "Joiner". Thul, now known as UnuThul, has been influencing the hive mind from the top, and is the reason the Jedi have been drawn into the conflict so early. The Jedi find that they, too, are at risk of being absorbed by the collective consciousness of the nest since the collective accepts even non-insectoid species. Meanwhile, Tenel Ka, the queen mother of the Hapes Consortium, has become pregnant by Jacen Solo, and delays her pregnancy through use of the Force to reduce the chance of their daughter's paternity being discovered. When the child is born, she is named Allana.

=== The Unseen Queen ===
One year after the events in The Joiner King Jaina and Zekk work as a team to track down smugglers. They find evidence indicating that the Gorog, or "Dark Nest", are alive and somehow involved in smuggling. UnuThul explains to Mara Jade that the Dark Nest is after her because it had absorbed the consciousness of the wife and daughter of Daxar Ies, a man she killed back when she was an Emperor's Hand operative.

=== The Swarm War ===
The Swarm War takes place where The Unseen Queen ends, and involves a three way war between the Chiss, the Killik, and the Galactic Alliance. Luke Skywalker declares himself Grand Master of the Jedi, and succeeds in unifying them to an extent, and leads an assault on the Dark Nest. Lomi Plo meets her death at Skywalker's hand, and UnuThul is defeated by Luke as well after losing an arm. Thul is taken in by the Jedi for psychological treatment as the Killik revert to their naturally peaceful state, no longer unified by the Hive Mind or driven by the ambitions of the Dark Nest.

== Reception ==
The Joiner King was 10th on Publishers Weekly's and 45th on USA Today's bestseller lists.

The Unseen Queen was 7th on Publishers Weekly's and 30th on USA Today's bestseller lists.

The Swarm War was 5th on Publishers Weekly's and 15th on USA Today's bestseller lists.
