= Mara Jade =

Fictional character in Star Wars

Mara Jade Skywalker
- Star Wars character
- Mara Jade (right) and Luke Skywalker with their son Ben Skywalker
- First appearance: Heir to the Empire (1991)
- First game: Masters of Teras Kasi (1997)
- Last appearance: Fate of the Jedi: Apocalypse (2012)
- Created by: Timothy Zahn
- Portrayed by: Shannon McRandle
- Voiced by: Samantha Bennett (Return of the Jedi radio drama); Edie Mirman (Star Wars: Masters of Teräs Käsi); Heidi Shannon (Star Wars Jedi Knight: Mysteries of the Sith, Star Wars: Galactic Battlegrounds); Kath Soucie (Star Wars: Empire at War)

In-universe information
- Full name: Mara Jade Skywalker
- Species: Human
- Gender: Female
- Occupation: Emperor's Hand, smuggler, trader, Jedi Master
- Affiliation: Galactic Empire; Smugglers' Alliance; New Republic; Jedi; Galactic Alliance
- Spouse: Luke Skywalker
- Children: Ben Skywalker (son)
- Relatives: Padmé Amidala (mother-in-law, deceased); Shmi Skywalker (grandmother-in-law, deceased); Anakin Skywalker (father in-law, deceased); Leia Organa-Solo (sister-in-law); Han Solo (brother-in-law); Jaina Solo (niece); Jacen Solo (nephew, deceased); Anakin Solo (nephew, deceased); Cade Skywalker (great-great-grandson)
- Homeworld: Coruscant

Mara Jade Skywalker is a fictional character in the Star Wars franchise. She appears in the Legends continuity as the wife of Luke Skywalker and mother of Ben Skywalker. She has been voiced by Heidi Shannon, Edie Mirman, and Kath Soucie in various Star Wars video games.

== Concept and development ==
Her first appearance was in Timothy Zahn's Heir to the Empire (1991). Zahn imagined Mara Jade as a strong, complex female character, somebody he thought lacking in the Star Wars universe. While competent, she is flawed. When the Thrawn trilogy ended in 1993 with The Last Command, Zahn thought it was the last book for which he would develop the character. Asked to write another novel, he established two goals: "to end the war between the New Republic and the Empire, and to get Luke Skywalker and Mara together." Although Lucasfilm resisted the idea of Luke marrying Mara, they eventually acquiesced.

In 2018, Zahn said Lucasfilm gave him some creative control over the character of Mara Jade: any appearance of Mara in new works requires Zahn's approval. Zahn also explained that Lucasfilm Story Group held the authority to prevent him from incorporating Mara back into the canon, so any appearance of the character must be approved by both parties. Zahn said he would only allow her to appear if she plays an important role in the plot, and he would block any kind of cameo appearance. Previously, the character of Grand Admiral Thrawn, another Zahn creation, made the jump from Legends to canon, albeit with a slightly-reworked story. Subsequently, Zahn said he hoped to find a way to bring Mara into the canon, stating "If there was a generic, or organic, spot for her to fit into a story... I promise people, I will pitch it to the Lucasfilm story group, and then, it's their decision whether to allow it or not."

Compared to Princess Leia, Zahn said, "Mara has a sharper and sarcastic manner, and of course, she had to go through the painful realization her service was to an evil cause. But both women are strong without sacrificing their femininity, a balance which I think some authors have trouble writing. Bear in mind, too, Leia was one of the first people in the New Republic who decided Mara could be trusted, which perhaps says something about their understanding of each other."

== Appearances ==
Mara is introduced as smuggler Talon Karrde's second-in-command in Heir to the Empire. The novel establishes she was previously an "Emperor's Hand"—a special agent—for Emperor Palpatine.

Several stories depict Jade before the events in Heir to the Empire, showing her training under Palpatine and executing his orders. The Thrawn trilogy depicts Mara's first confrontation with Luke Skywalker, whom she swears to kill to avenge Palpatine's death (Palpatine sent her a faked image of Luke and Vader turning on him together, rather than Vader killing Palpatine, and the demand for Luke's death motivated by Palpatine's desire for revenge against his father rather than Luke's actions).

This was re-inforced by the Emperor's final telepathic command to assassinate Luke, plaguing her thoughts since his death; upon learning this situation, Luke vowed to help Mara break Palpatine's hold on her, regardless of the threat she posed to Luke. Toward the end of the trilogy, she turns against the Empire, and resolves her anger toward Luke, silences the command without killing him and instead killing Luke's clone—Luuke Skywalker—made by the Dark Jedi Joruus C'baoth to challenge Luke.

In doing so, she took Anakin's lightsaber—recovered after the initial duel between Luke and Darth Vader—and used it to stab C'baoth. At the close of The Last Command, Luke gives her Anakin's lightsaber because he believed she earned it and because he truly wanted her to have it. Over the course of the series, Luke recognizes in Mara an underdeveloped affinity for the Force; and although she initially resists Jedi training, she eventually becomes a Jedi Master.

Luke and Mara develop a strong bond in Zahn's The Hand of Thrawn duology; he proposes marriage, and the two wed in Michael A. Stackpole's graphic novel Union. She delivers a son, Ben, during The New Jedi Order series.

In the Legacy of the Force series, Mara is suspicious of her nephew, Jacen Solo, after he sends Ben on several ethically-dubious missions. Upon learning Jacen is a Sith apprentice, Mara vows to kill him, but Jacen ultimately kills her in Sacrifice. She later appears as a Force ghost, first to Ben then to Luke, in Revelation. She also appears as a Force ghost to Cade Skywalker in the Legacy comics, set more than a century after the Star Wars films.

=== Other appearances ===
Mara also appears in the short story "Sleight of Hand: The Tale of Mara Jade," by Timothy Zahn, in the anthology Tales from Jabba's Palace. In this story, she infiltrates Jabba the Hutt's palace as a dancing girl to assassinate Luke Skywalker under orders of the Emperor, but misses her chance after Jabba drops him into the Rancor's lair then escapes.

The six-issue comic series Star Wars: Mara Jade – By the Emperor's Hand details Mara's experiences immediately before and after the Emperor's death in Return of the Jedi.

Mara was portrayed by model Shannon McRandle (as Shannon Baksa) on several cards in the Star Wars Customizable Card Game.

She is a playable character in Star Wars: Masters of Teräs Käsi, Star Wars Jedi Knight: Mysteries of the Sith, Star Wars: Empire at War and Star Wars: The Force Unleashed (Wii version). Meeting her was also a mission objective in the defunct massively multiplayer online game Star Wars Galaxies. She also narrates the Imperial campaign in Star Wars: Galactic Battlegrounds.

She was portrayed by Denise Donovan in the Team Starkid musical parody Ani.

== Canonicity ==
In 2008, when franchise creator George Lucas said there would be no sequel trilogy, he explained that plot elements from the Expanded Universe were not part of his story, saying, "Luke doesn't get married". With the 2012 acquisition of Lucasfilm by The Walt Disney Company, most of the licensed Star Wars novels and comics produced since the originating 1977 film Star Wars were re-branded as Star Wars Legends and declared non-canon to the franchise in April 2014. According to authors Claudia Gray and Timothy Zahn, Lucasfilm has barred any writer of using the character in any new canon work.

== Reception ==
Mara Jade was chosen by IGN as the 19th top Star Wars character. IGN's Jesse Schedeen also listed the character as the top 10th Star Wars hero, noting she "entered the Expanded Universe early, and she stuck around for so long because she's just a great character". UGO Networks called the character the seventh top Star Wars Expanded Universe character, calling her complex. In 2006, Zahn called Mara and Grand Admiral Thrawn his favorite characters out of those he created, saying "Mara, with her attitude and her Jedi skills, is just plain fun to write, especially in opposition—or in partnership—with Luke."
