= Jacen Solo =

Character in Star Wars

Jacen Solo Darth Caedus
- Star Wars character
- Jacen Solo as Darth Caedus
- First appearance: Heir to the Empire (novel, 1991) - in utero The Last Command (novel, 1993) - born
- Last appearance: Fate of the Jedi: Apocalypse (novel, 2012)
- Created by: Timothy Zahn

In-universe information
- Aliases: Jace; Yun-Shuno; Najack Ell
- Species: Human
- Gender: Male
- Title(s): Darth Caedus; JCOS-2 (Joint Chief of State 2)
- Occupation: Jedi Knight; Dark Lord of the Sith; Chief of State of the Galactic Alliance; Head of the Galactic Alliance Guard
- Affiliation: New Jedi Order; New Republic; Galactic Alliance; Lumiya's Sith; Galactic Alliance Guard
- Family: Han Solo (father); Leia Organa Solo (mother); Jaina Solo (twin sister); Anakin Solo (brother, deceased)
- Significant others: Tenel Ka Djo; Anja Gallandro (brief love interest); Danni Quee; Tahiri Veila (implied in the Fate of the Jedi series)
- Children: Allana Solo (with Tenel Ka Djo)
- Relatives: Luke Skywalker (maternal uncle); Mara Jade Skywalker (maternal aunt, deceased); Ben Skywalker (maternal first cousin); Darth Vader (maternal grandfather, deceased); Padmé Amidala (maternal grandmother, deceased); Shmi Skywalker (maternal great-grandmother, deceased); Jonash Solo (paternal grandfather); Jaina Solo I (paternal grandmother); Thrackan Sal-Solo (paternal first cousin once removed, deceased)
- Homeworld: Coruscant

Jacen Solo is a fictional character in literature based on the Star Wars film series, set in what is now designated as the original-canon Star Wars Legends continuity. The son of Han Solo and Leia Organa Solo, as well as the nephew of Luke Skywalker, he is a major character in several novels, particularly the New Jedi Order series. He becomes the antagonist of the Legacy of the Force series under the name Darth Caedus. Jacen's other familial connections of note to his native continuity include being the brother of Jaina Solo and Anakin Solo as well as the cousin of Ben Skywalker.

Jacen has been noted as an influence for Kylo Ren, the canonical son of Han and Leia and villain of the Star Wars sequel trilogy, and Jacen Syndulla, the canonical son of Kanan Jarrus and Hera Syndulla from the epilogue series finale of Star Wars Rebels, later portrayed by Evan Whitten in Ahsoka.

== Fictional history ==
=== Childhood ===
Jacen Solo was created for the Thrawn trilogy of novels by Timothy Zahn, set about five years after Return of the Jedi. He is introduced as one of an unnamed pair of twins Leia is pregnant with in the first installment of the trilogy, the 1991 novel Heir to the Empire. In the third installment, the 1993 novel The Last Command, he is born five minutes after his sister Jaina on Coruscant. The twins, and eventually their younger brother Anakin, were sent to live at various safe havens, under the protection of Leia's handmaiden, Winter.

In Jedi Search, the twins returned to Coruscant at age three and had many adventures there. Once, they became lost in the underworld of Imperial City with C-3PO, but they were quickly rescued and returned to their mother, the Chief of State of the New Republic.

In The Crystal Star, all three children were abducted, together with many other children with Force abilities, by Hethrir. Hethrir tried to brainwash them into becoming Dark Jedi in order to bring about the rebirth of the Galactic Empire, but the children defeated their captor.

=== Jedi Academy years ===
In the Young Jedi Knights series, Jacen travels to Yavin 4 with his sister to begin his Jedi training. Jacen discovers a strong connection to the Living Force — the concentration on the present moment — and can communicate with and calm many of the jungle creatures near the Academy. He even keeps a small menagerie of animals in his room in the Great Massassi Temple. He and his sister befriend the Wookiee Lowbacca (nicknamed Lowie by his friends) and the warrior princess Tenel Ka.

In Heirs of the Force and Shadow Academy, Jacen and Jaina discover a crashed TIE fighter from the Battle of Yavin. Jaina installs a hyperdrive in the downed starfighter and begins fixing it to fly again. Jacen, Lowbacca, and Tenel Ka help her to practice their Force skills until all are held captive by the TIE's original pilot, Qorl, who had been living in the jungle for two decades. They eventually escape, but so does Qorl, leaving the jungle moon behind and searching for any remnants of the Galactic Empire. Qorl discovers the Shadow Academy, a training ground for Dark Jedi commanded by one of Luke Skywalker's fallen students, Brakiss, along with the remains of the Dathomiri Nightsisters. These elements of the so-called Second Imperium kidnap Jacen, Jaina and Lowbacca, but they resist the dark side and are rescued by Luke Skywalker and Tenel Ka.

The friends return to Coruscant for a short vacation, and are reunited with the twins' childhood friend Zekk. They are forced to fight Jacen and Jaina several times, and the twins and their friends finally progress far enough to be tasked with building their first lightsabers. Jacen uses a corusca gem he had gained earlier for his focusing crystal.

Jacen's hard-learned lesson hits home once again in Lightsabers, when Tenel Ka rushes to complete her lightsaber to keep up with her friends. She uses an imperfect crystal and her blade shorts out in a sparring match with Jacen. His lightsaber passes through thin air where her weapon had been seconds before and severs the young woman's arm. Though she bears him no ill will for the accident, Jacen is wracked with guilt.

In Darkest Knight, the twins and Tenel Ka go to Kashyyyk with Lowbacca to witness his sister's adulthood rites. In Jedi Under Siege, the Jedi trainees and the Shadow Academy have their final confrontation on Yavin 4. The twins, with help from Luke and Zekk, bring down the Shadow Academy and the Second Imperium forever.

Throughout the series, Jacen and Jaina continue their training at Yavin 4, meeting new friends like Raynar Thul. They cannot convince Zekk to stay at the Academy with them, but Jacen and Jaina remain friends with him. With his and Raynar's help, they discover a threat to the New Republic: the Diversity Alliance, an alien, anti-human group. The Alliance is building up massive support among peoples that had been oppressed by the Empire. They are led by a Twi'lek Nolaa Tarkona, the sister of Oola, who was murdered by Jabba the Hutt in Return of the Jedi.

In Jedi Bounty, Jacen, Jaina, and their friends are briefly held captive on Ryloth and have to escape to its harsh surface. They have gone there in an attempt to rescue Lowbacca, who had misguidedly joined the anti-human Diversity Alliance. In the following book, The Emperor's Plague, they get to the bottom of a plot they had suspected all along, and catch up with Raynar's father, Bornan Thul, to race the Diversity Alliance fleet to an Imperial storehouse hidden in the deep core. There is hidden a supply of deadly diseases created by General Evir Derricote almost two decades before. Tarkona wishes to unleash a plague against humans and wipe them all out, but the Jedi and Alliance dissidents defeat her. She succumbs to one of the diseases herself on a faraway planet. Bornan Thul dies from one of the plagues right before his son's eyes.

In Return to Ord Mantell, they go on a trip with their father to the titular planet to watch a race. There, they run into Czethros, a bounty hunter who once hunted Han. They are ambushed by Black Sun agents, but are helped by Anja Gallandro, a young woman who wields a lightsaber, though she is not a Jedi. Although attracted to Tenel Ka, Jacen becomes infatuated with the older woman. Anja had blamed Han Solo for killing her father, but Solo reveals that her father died in a trap while finding treasure.

In Trouble on Cloud City, they discover Czethros is a minor leader of Black Sun, and is trying to gather enough power to overcome the New Republic. Jacen, Tenel Ka, and Lowbacca are ambushed by several Black Sun mercenaries, and Jacen is almost killed.

In Crisis at Crystal Reef, Jaina attempts to help Kessel and capture Czetheros while Jacen rushes to help Anja with her spice addiction and help her with Black Sun. With help, Anja beats her addiction and accepts her father's death. Jacen thinks Anja has Jedi potential, but it turns out she didn't. He gets over his infatuation with Anja when she goes to work for Lando.

=== Yuuzhan Vong War ===
In the New Jedi Order series, Luke takes Jacen as his Jedi apprentice. Jacen learns much from Luke, though they disagree on many philosophical issues. Jacen believes in the Force not only as a tool, but as part of something greater. He tells his brother Anakin that the Force is a guide to find one's place in destiny.

When the Yuuzhan Vong attack the New Republic in Dark Tide: Onslaught, Jacen comes to believe that many Jedi are handling the threat too aggressively. He abandons his powers temporarily to contemplate the Force and butts heads with his father over the morality of 'pirate' attacks on Peace Brigade vessels. Only his love for his mother brings Jacen back into the front lines of the battle. Eventually, Han and Jacen make their peace, the former declaring that while he doesn't always understand his son, he is proud of him.

In Star by Star Jacen joins a daring mission to Myrkr. A Jedi strike force, led by Anakin, is to infiltrate a Yuuzhan Vong cloning facility where the invaders craft deadly Jedi-hunting beasts called Voxyn. The mission is a disaster, ending with Anakin's death, in which Jaina reacts by touching the dark side of the Force. Forced into the leadership position, Jacen uses the Force Meld to bind the team together into a cohesive fighting unit. After destroying the voxyn queen, Jacen is captured by the Yuuzhan Vong army under the command of Vergere and Nom Anor. Jacen disappears, along with his presence in the Force.

In Traitor, Jacen awakes to find himself in the Embrace of Pain, a rack-like torture device favored by the Yuuzhan Vong. The torture nearly breaks Jacen's spirit, until he learns to use the pain he suffers to sustain himself. He remains under the care and tutelage of the avian Vergere, who he learns had once been a Jedi of the Old Republic, and who had even met his grandfather, Anakin Skywalker. He is put to work on Yuuzhan Vong ship, where he uses a number of herbs to heal slaves and get his captors to trust him. Using the implanted slave seed beneath his flesh as a conduit, Jacen communicates with the living instruments of Yuuzhan Vong technology. He uses this connection to stage a daring escape from captivity, commanding Yuuzhan Vong amphistaffs to surround him like living armor.

Jacen and Vergere flee to Coruscant. The planet's entire surface is undergoing a radical transformation. Yuuzhan Vong organic growths cover the once gleaming metropolis, remaking the planet into a Yuuzhan Vong paradise. The world is to be their new capital, a recreation of the planet that had spawned them, Yuuzhan'tar.

Vergere removes the slave seed from Jacen, but he can still sense the Yuuzhan Vong. Jacen is later surrounded by Yuuzhan Vong warriors whom Vergere had led to him. Wanting revenge, Jacen channels his hatred for Vergere into Force lightning; he is frightened by this connection to the dark side, however, and runs away. Vergere finds him in his destroyed home and gives him back full use of the Force. He is once again surrounded by Yuuzhan Vong captors; left with no choice, he surrenders and agrees to join their cause. He becomes the "khattazz al'Yun," or Avatar of God. Nom Anor intends to use Jacen to sacrifice Jaina, thus fulfilling an ancient Yuuzhan Vong prophecy.

Jacen's true allegiance is his own, however. During a test of Jacen's faith, the Yuuzhan Vong orders him to sacrifice captured Jedi Ganner Rhysode. Instead, the two Jedi turn against their captors. As Ganner holds off the Yuuzhan Vong, Jacen confronts the World Brain. The malevolent entity remembers the bond that Jacen had forged earlier, and Jacen suggests to it to work against the Yuuzhan Vong.

Ganner dies that day, though Jacen escapes with Vergere. He returns to the dwindling New Republic territories a different man: haggard, thin and hardened. He goes on a much needed vacation, but returns to frontline combat aboard the cruiser Ralroost. His ability to start the Jedi Meld is a large asset to Admiral Kre'fey, and Jacen joined the Alliance Fleet with elements of Garm Bel Iblis's forces in a large-scale deception at Ebaq 9. The battle ends in a victory, but results in Vergere's death. Her spectral form appears to him soon after.

As the newly formed Galactic Alliance emerged, Jacen accompanied his uncle Luke Skywalker into the Unknown Regions to seek a solution to the Yuuzhan Vong menace. Jacen would be instrumental in the search for Zonama Sekot and in the efforts to convince the living planet to join the fight against the Yuuzhan Vong. Jacen kills Supreme Overlord Onimi, who had been using Supreme Overlord Shimrra as a puppet, in a spectacular confrontation where the Force uses Jacen as a conduit to defeat Onimi, considering that Jacen was almost killed with just one hit by Shimrra himself, and in that moment Jacen started believing that he is beyond good and evil, marking the beginning of his fall. After the grueling final confrontation and the war's end, Jacen tells Luke that he had decided to travel the galaxy to learn more about the Force. While on his five-year journey Jacen enters a realm of the Force known as beyond shadows, thanks to his training with a sect called the Mind Walkers. In this realm Jacen gazes into the Pool of Knowledge that holds the Throne of Balance, (where in all future events are shown) Jacen sees a dark man ruling the Galaxy and becomes determined to prevent this evil future. Following this experience, Jacen begins his descent to the dark side of the Force.

=== Dark Nest Crisis ===
In Dark Nest, Jacen feels an urge through the Force and follows his sister to the Unknown Regions to help the insectoid Killik against an invading Chiss force. He returns to Galactic Alliance space after his parents, resulting in his uncle and aunt to come for him, Jaina, and the other Jedi. He then travels to the Hapes Cluster to ask Tenel Ka to assist with the Chiss/Killik conflict, believing that the fleet could act as a buffer between the two armies. She obliges and sends a fleet of Hapan Battle Dragons to protect the Killiks.

In The Unseen Queen, Tenel Ka gives birth to his daughter, Allana, who is then attacked by the Gorog. Jacen successfully repels the attack and keeps his daughter safe. Possessed with a strong fear of his daughter or Tenel Ka being harmed, Jacen uses the Force to send Tenel Ka's grandmother (the person behind the attack) into a coma. Immediately afterward, he sees a vision of a neverending war that will destroy the galaxy, with the Killiks at the heart of it. Determined to save his daughter and the galaxy from his vision, he sets out to provoke the Chiss into destroying the Killiks. Jacen later reveals that he never knew who started the war in his vision.

In The Swarm War, Luke Skywalker takes his nephew's advice so many times that he even listens when Jacen tells him that he is not ready to face Lomi Plo, the Dark Queen of the Gorog. Jacen, Mara and Luke know that doubt and fear would make Lomi Plo invisible to her enemy. Jacen, along with R2-D2, helps Luke conquer some of his fears about Mara's involvement with the death of his mother, and then accompanies him to face Plo.

During the fight with Plo, Luke falters for a moment when Mara is injured, and doubt enters his mind. Plo then holds him in place, unable to move. In that instant, Jacen is critically wounded by Plo while saving Mara Skywalker's life. A well-placed shot from Mara injures Plo, after which Mara tends to Jacen's wounds. While he and Mara recover, Jacen beseeches Luke to embrace his darker emotions. Luke refuses and goes back to the true Jedi way, defeating the Dark Queen and Raynar Thul without using the dark side.

In the latter novel, Jacen joins his uncle in watching holovideos of his grandparents, Anakin Skywalker and Padmé Amidala; in particular, he sees Anakin fall to the dark side and Padmé die in childbirth partly as a result of Anakin's treachery. (These scenes are first portrayed in Star Wars: Episode III – Revenge of the Sith). Jacen actually sympathizes with Anakin's desire to protect his wife, and reminds Luke that Anakin was a fallible human being.

=== Legacy of the Force ===
In Betrayal, Jacen starts training his young cousin Ben in the ways of the Force. After a successful mission to Adumar that ends in a life-threatening attack, they return for a dinner party at his parents' new home. There, Han voices his concern over Corellia trying to gain independence. Luke orders Jacen and Ben to disable the Centerpoint Station, an ancient artifact that Corellian leader (and Han's cousin) Thrackan Sal-Solo is trying to use to his advantage. Ben disables the station while Jacen keeps Thrackan busy, ensuring the Galactic Alliance's partial victory as another fleet built in secret spoils the main attack.

While travelling to a subterranean base, Ben and Nelani, a Jedi Knight, are forced out of a mining car. Their guide, Brisha Syo creates a dark side phantom of Luke Skywalker, who attacks and very nearly kills Jacen. Eventually, Brisha stops the projections and takes Jacen to an office, where Darth Vectivus, the supposed Sith Lord they are hunting, lives. After fighting Force projections with Ben, Nelani catches up with them. Brisha is revealed to be Lumiya, the Dark Lady of the Sith. She reveals that Vergere is a Sith apprentice, and that Jacen has already received Sith training. Lumiya says that Jacen is going to become the next Sith Lord. Unsure of his next move, Jacen uses the Force to create visions of the future. In each vision in which Lumiya is arrested, the galaxy is consumed in an endless war that eventually places Jacen against Luke. In the vision, Jacen kills his uncle.

Horrified, Jacen spares Lumiya. Nelani then tries to arrest the Sith, but Jacen intervenes. Jacen realizes that Nelani will, if allowed to survive, possibly fulfill the dark vision he had seen. He then fights and kills her, asking her forgiveness before striking the fatal blow. He agrees to consider what Lumiya had said and leaves the asteroid with an unconscious Ben. Jacen then erases Ben's memories of Lumiya and tells him that both she and Nelani had been killed by dark side phantoms. They return to Coruscant; however, after Jacen departs, Lumiya says that she had won.

In Bloodlines, fully pledged to Lumiya, Jacen becomes head of the GFFA's newly formed secret police, the Galactic Alliance Guard. With Ben at his side, he begins rounding up Corellians for internment and deportation. During an interrogation of a suspected assassin (who turns out to be Ailyn Vel, Boba Fett's daughter), Jacen tries to use the Force to extract information from her and kills her accidentally in the process.

In Tempest, Jacen also takes command of Rogue Squadron while it participates in the blockade of Corellia. He shoots down a civilian freighter that was attempting to run the blockade, and had fired on him, then relieves his sister from duty because she had refused to do it. He also uses the Anakin Solo to fire upon the Millennium Falcon, while both his sister and his parents are on board. He believes his parents to have been involved in a failed attempt to assassinate Tenel Ka; the Solos had in fact been set up by Dur Gejjen, Prime Minister of Corellia.

In Sacrifice, Lumiya says she is pleased by his progress, but instructs him that to truly become a Sith he would have to undergo the Trial of Sacrifice: to kill that which he loves most. Doing this, he believes, would allow him to use the powers of the Sith without becoming evil and would "immortalize his love" for his sacrifice. Jacen decides there is only one way to fulfill this last obstacle: he would have to kill Tenel Ka and their daughter Allana. Nevertheless, after Ben tells Mara that he overheard Jacen communicating with Lumiya, Mara tracks Jacen down in the Hapes Consortium. After a long and heated battle, Jacen kills Mara Jade; the sacrifice necessary to becoming a Sith Lord is not Jacen's love, but Ben's. Ben suspects Jacen almost immediately, upon meeting Jacen at his mother's body. Eventually, Jacen chooses the Sith name Darth Caedus.

By Fury, Darth Caedus is the principal antagonist of the series, and the declared enemy of nearly every other major character: His parents and sister have disowned him, Luke is sworn to redeem him, and Ben is driven to seek justice for his mother. In the novel, Caedus kidnaps Allana so Tenel Ka and the Hapans won't decide to leave the government, but Han, Leia, Luke, Jaina, Ben, and their allies save Allana. After saving Allana, Leia tells Caedus to become a Jedi again, but he refuses. Han and Leia later find out Allana is Caedus and Tenel Ka's child. At the end, Jaina plans to have training from Boba Fett to help her face off against Caedus, despite her parents once being foes with Fett.

In Revelation, Caedus takes on a new apprentice, Tahiri Veila to replace Ben and turns to the task of ending the war. He entices the Imperial Remnant to join him in an attack on the planet Fondor. Although Admiral Niathal wants to offer the planet the chance to surrender, Caedus is determined to make an example of Fondor by crippling the shipyards and its planetary government. After previously sharing military secrets, which leads to hundreds of deaths and compromises the battle plan at Fondor, Niathal arranges a cease-fire without consulting Caedus. Enraged at this treason, Caedus orders the fleet to ignore Niathal's orders and bombard the major cities. Niathal orders all ships loyal to her to attack the Anakin Solo. Two-thirds of the fleet side with Caedus, while the rest ally themselves with Niathal. When the Imperial Remnant refuses to assist Caedus, his new apprentice assassinates Imperial Head of State Gilad Pellaeon and turns control over to the Moffs who then come to aid Jacen. A mysterious fleet led by Admiral Daala, loyal to Pellaeon, appears, accompanied by one hundred Mandalorian mercenaries and together, owing to Daala's experimental weapons, they send the Galactic Alliance Fleet into retreat.

Caedus then takes control of Coruscant and claims sole control of the Galactic Alliance.

In Invincible, Jaina takes it upon herself to defeat her brother. Caedus's meditations are disrupted by Luke Skywalker, in an attempt to hide Jaina's attack. Jaina, accompanied by several Mandalorian commandos, confronts Caedus, who quickly dispatches the Mandalorians, while Jaina acts as a sniper. When she finally runs out of ammunition, she seizes a Mandalorian saber and severs Caedus' arm. Jaina withdraws, however, due to her own injuries. After escaping an attack led by Luke Skywalker on the bridge of the Anakin Solo, Caedus sees a vision of his daughter Allana on a white throne in a time of peace. This vision convinces Caedus that he has won — he would bring peace to the galaxy, and prevent his visions of war and suffering from coming true.

At the book's climax, Caedus and Jaina face off in a final lightsaber duel aboard Caedus' flagship, the Anakin Solo. In the midst of the duel, Caedus comes back to the light and attempts to persuade Jaina of his intentions to protect Tenel Ka and Allana. Jaina refuses to listen, however, and attacks him after he deactivates and holsters his lightsaber. She later slams the door shut in his face when he tries to leave the fight. After a grueling battle in which both are seriously injured, Jacen is defeated when Jaina severs his Achilles tendon and stabs him in the heart. As he dies, Jacen reaches out to both his former lover and his child through the Force, warning them to flee from an approaching bio-warfare attack designed by the Imperial Remnant to kill them. In this act of selflessness, Jaina sees the remnants of the good man her brother had once been. Following Caedus's death and the war's end, the Galactic Alliance emerges victorious over the Confederation and peace is restored to the galaxy, just as Jacen had foreseen through a vision in the Force.

=== Fate of the Jedi ===
Though Jacen makes few true appearances in the Fate of the Jedi, which follows the Legacy of the Force series, his legacy is felt throughout the series, as Luke Skywalker is arrested for negligence of duty and is sentenced to a ten-year exile, in which alongside his son Ben, he tries to ascertain the circumstances of how and why Jacen turned to the dark side.

Jacen's spirit makes its first appearance in Abyss, wherein he warns Luke and Ben about Abeloth, the main antagonist of the series.

Then, in the final novel Apocalypse, Jacen's spirit (along with Mara's) provides aid to Luke as he partners with Darth Krayt in the final battle against Abeloth. Following Abeloth's destruction, Jacen reveals that Krayt was the dark figure he saw in his vision of the future and the source of his downfall; he saw his daughter Allana standing next to Krayt. In response, Krayt insists that while Caedus's actions simply delayed the Sith, and they are eventually going to succeed in their planned takeover of the galaxy.

In aiding the Jedi against Abeloth, Jacen posthumously redeems himself; however, he still refers to his fate as damnation. While Luke does not forgive his nephew for his complicity in Mara's death, he does receive an understanding of what led Jacen to that point.

=== Star Wars: Legacy ===
The second volume of the Legacy comic series, set about 140 years after Return of the Jedi, features Jacen's descendant Ania Solo as the protagonist. In general, the descendants of Jacen, Jaina and Ben are main characters in this era, set when and after Darth Krayt takes over the galaxy. Although they themselves do not appear in person as spirits, older characters like Luke and Mara do.

== Reception ==
IGN listed Jacen as #17 on their list of the top 100 Star Wars heroes, saying that he had a more "profound effect" than any of the other Solo children on the Star Wars setting. Jesse Schedeen, writing for IGN, also listed Darth Caedus as #5 in a reader-inspired list of top Star Wars villains, and called his "defining moment of villainy" his murder of Mara Jade. UGO.com listed Jacen as their top Star Wars expanded universe character, calling him "one of the most fearsome - and most tragic - villains in the Star Wars universe".

== Legacy ==
With the sequel film Star Wars: The Force Awakens in production, in April 2014 most of the licensed Star Wars novels and comics produced since the 1977 film Star Wars were declared non-canon to the franchise. The epilogue of "Family Reunion – and Farewell", the series finale of Star Wars Rebels, introduced a character named Jacen Syndulla by series creator Dave Filoni in honor of Jacen Solo.

== See also ==
- Solo family
- Kylo Ren
