= Millennium Falcon (novel) =

2008 Star Wars novel by James Luceno

- Author: James Luceno
- Cover artist: John van Fleet
- Language: English
- Subject: Star Wars
- Genre: Science fiction
- Publisher: Random House Publishing Group / Del Rey Books
- Publication date: October 21, 2008
- Publication place: United States
- Pages: 336
- ISBN: 0-345-50700-2
- Preceded by: Crosscurrent
- Followed by: Outcast

Millennium Falcon (2008) is a novel by James Luceno set in the Star Wars expanded universe about the fictional history of Han Solo's starship, the Millennium Falcon. It was originally set to be released on December 30, 2008, but was pushed up to October 21, 2008.

== Plot ==
Much of the novel delves into the fictional history of the Millennium Falcon, from the time it came off the assembly line to when it was owned by Han Solo.

In 19 BBY, during the Battle of Coruscant in the clone wars, the Falcon is known as the Stellar Envoy and captained by Tobb Jadak and his copilot Reeze Duurmun. Jadak and Duurmun are conspirators in a plot to overthrow Supreme Chancellor Palpatine as leader of the Old Republic. Their mission fails when an erratic hyperspace jump lands the Envoy in an accident, killing Duurmun and placing Jadak in a coma that lasts for more than sixty years. By 43 ABY, two years after the end of the Second Galactic Civil War, Jadak awakes, having barely aged since his time in the coma. With the help of Flitcher Poste, they attempt to find out what happened to the Stellar Envoy.

Meanwhile, the Solos discover a mysterious object aboard the Falcon, and decide to ascertain the Falcon's origins. They work their way back in time from when Lando Calrissian first owned the ship until they eventually cross paths with Jadak and Poste. Jadak reveals that the mysterious object in the Solos hands will lead them to a treasure on the world of Tandun III, which was meant to overthrow Palpatine. On their heels is Lestra Oxic, a mysterious businessman who wants the treasure.

When all parties arrive on Tandun III, they find that the planet is devastated, due to an invasion by the Yuuzhan Vong. The treasure in there turns out to be a fake. Oxic then hires Jadak and Poste to help him find the real treasure.

The Solos escape from a collapsing Tandun III. They all make it out in time and the planet explodes, with no fatalities.

The novel ends with Luke Skywalker calling the Solos to come back to Coruscant as Galactic Alliance Chief of State Natasi Daala had Luke arrested for lack of action in defeating Jacen Solo during the Second Galactic Civil War.

At the end of the book is an introduction to the novel Outcast, the first novel in the Fate of the Jedi series.

== Characters ==
- Han Solo
- Leia Organa Solo
- Allana Solo, Han Solo's granddaughter
- C-3PO
- Tobb Jadak, an explorer
- Natasi Daala, a Chief of State in the Galactic Alliance
- Flitcher Poste, an explorer
- Reeze Duurmun, a profiteer
- Bammy Decree, a retired technician
- Rej Taunt, a crime boss
- Luke Skywalker
- Lando Calrissian
- Armand Isard, a Senate Intelligence Bureau Director of the Old Republic
- Fang Zar, a Senator of the Old Republic
- Quip Fargil, a retiree
- Lestra Oxic, a philanthropist
- Palpatine
- Soly Kantt, a CEC Manager
- J'oopi She, a Jedi Master of the Old Republic

== Reception ==
SF Site said the story is "a fun chase", although the ending was noted as "a tad unsatisfying". Library Journal called the novel "an exciting action-packed adventure".

The novel was 14th on The New York Times Best Seller list and 13th on Publishers Weekly's best seller list.
