= Crucible (Denning novel) =

2013 novel by Troy Denning

Star Wars: Crucible
- Author: Troy Denning
- Cover artist: Cliff Nielsen
- Series: Star Wars
- Publisher: Del Rey
- Publication date: July 9, 2013
- Media type: Hardcover
- Pages: 336
- ISBN: 978-0-345-51142-3
- Preceded by: Apocalypse

Star Wars: Crucible is a Star Wars novel written by Troy Denning, released by Del Rey Books on July 9, 2013. Featuring Luke Skywalker, Han Solo and Leia Organa Solo, it is set 45 years after the 1977 film Star Wars. It is a follow-up to the Fate of the Jedi series of novels. To date, it is chronologically the final Star Wars Legends novel to be released.

== Cover Summary ==
Han Solo, Luke Skywalker, and Princess Leia have spent a lifetime fighting wars, bringing the Jedi back from extinction, raising families, and saving the galaxy more times than they can count. They've earned the right to rest on their laurels and let the younger generation shoulder the burden—but fate has another adventure in store for our heroes, a quest only they can tackle and hope to survive...

== Reception ==
Starburst expressed criticism regarding a particular plot point involving the deaths of thousands of people, suggesting it was treated too lightly; however, they ultimately concluded that the book is a good send-off for the ‘Big Three’. Library Journal wrote that Denning "recaptures the feel of the Star Wars universe and its beloved characters." Screen Rant included the novel on the list of "10 canceled Legends stories that deserve to be finished".

According to the publisher, the book is on The New York Times Best Seller list.
