= Troy Denning =

American author

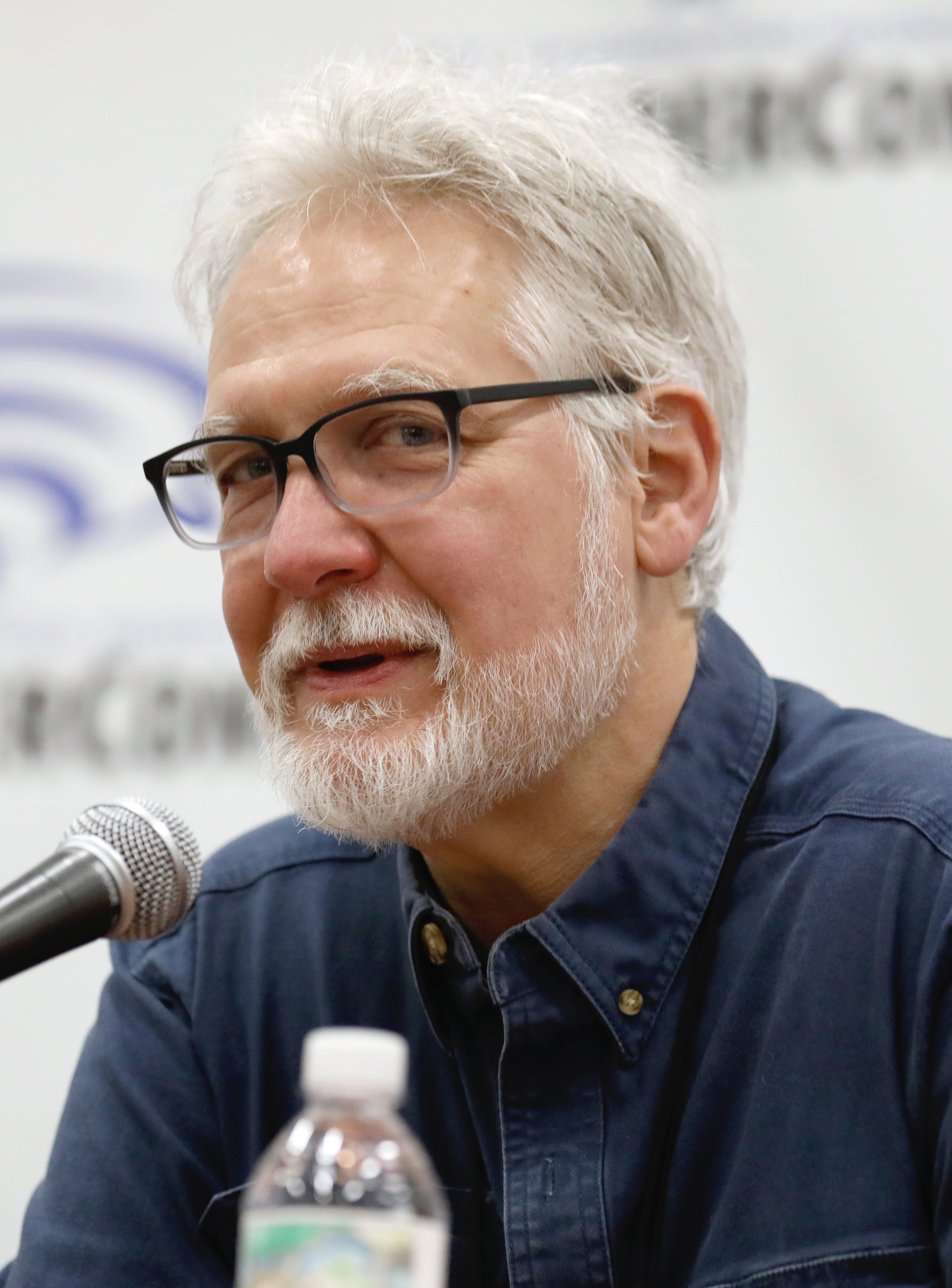
- Troy Denning at the 2024 WonderCon
- Education: Beloit College
- Occupations: Writer, game designer
- Spouse: Andria
- Writing career
- Genres: Role-playing games, fantasy

Troy Denning is an American fantasy and science fiction author and game designer who has written more than two dozen novels.

== Background ==
Denning grew up in the mountain town of Idaho Springs, Colorado. An avid reader of science fiction and fantasy, he began writing himself at the age of fourteen in 80-page spiral-bound notebooks, and began to collect the usual quantity of rejection slips. Around his eighteenth birthday, he received a rejection slip from editor Ben Bova, but one with a signature and a handwritten note thanking him for the submission. Heartened, Denning continued to write as he attended Beloit College, where he also played on their Division III football team.

== Career ==
Denning joined TSR as a game designer in 1981, and was promoted a year later to Manager of Designers, before he moved to the book department. Denning then worked for two years managing the Pacesetter game company. Denning designed the adventure board game Chill: Black Morn Manor (1985) for Pacesetter. When Mayfair Games acquired ownership of the horror game Chill from Pacesetter, Denning also moved to Mayfair at that time; Denning worked on the line with Mayfair staffers David Ladyman, Jeff Leason and Louis Prosperi, to create a second edition of Chill (1990). After his stint at Mayfair Games, Denning went freelance.

Denning wrote the third novel in TSR's "Avatar Trilogy", Waterdeep (1989), which he wrote under the house pseudonym Richard Awlinson; the book became a New York Times bestselling novel. He wrote the novel with Scott Ciencin, and the choice of the surname Awlinson was an inside joke which sounds like "all in one".

In October 1989 he rejoined TSR as a senior designer, co-creating the Dark Sun setting with Tim Brown and Mary Kirchoff. Denning and Brown led the Dark Sun project, with fiction editor Kirchoff, and artist Brom joined them soon with illustrations that helped make Dark Sun the first of TSR's world designs with a more artistic sensibility. According to Denning, the three designers envisioned "a world for experienced DMs that would push the AD&D game to its limits and let people do things like play half-giants and thri-kreen and superstrong characters—in short, all the really neat stuff we wanted to do ourselves, but that everybody kept saying would ruin game balance." Denning felt in 1998 that Dark Sun "did what we wanted it to, and it has attracted a devoted following. When I go to conventions, it's still what people want to talk about. Talking Brom into being the lead artist early was very fortunate for us; he would sketch weird creatures and settings and equipment, and we'd work them into the game." Brown and Denning also designed the 1991 D&D "black box" set, which became a top-seller for TSR, with half a million copies sold over the following six years.

Denning returned to freelance writing again in 1991, writing the bestselling "Prism Pentad" for the Dark Sun setting (1991–93), and the Forgotten Realms "Twilight Giants" trilogy (1994–95). Denning also wrote the Planescape hardcover Pages of Pain (1996): "It had to be from the Lady of Pain’s viewpoint—which is something of a problem, since (as every Planescape player knows) she never speaks—and (this was the really good part) the reader must know less about her at the end of the book than he does at the beginning, and nobody knows anything about her at the beginning." Denning recalled that Pages of Pain "really made me rethink the way I approach stories, and for that reason alone it was worth writing. It also ended up being a much deeper book than I had ever written before, which I think was a result of the extreme approach I was forced to take. Those who have [read it] seem to think it's my best work. It was certainly the most challenging and—forgive the pun—'painful' to write." Denning continued the story told in Waterdeep's sequel, Prince of Lies (1993) by James Lowder, with the novel Crucible: The Trial of Cyric the Mad. Denning then authored another Forgotten Realms novel called Faces of Deception. Denning's other notable works are Dragonwall and The Parched Sea. Denning wrote the novel The Sentinel for The Sundering, a fictional event set in the expanded D&D universe.

He is also the author of a number of Star Wars expanded universe novels. Including Invincible, the ninth and final book in the Legacy of the Force series, was released in May 2008. He also authored the third and sixth books in the series. He has also been the author for three books in the Fate of the Jedi series. And the 9th book in The New Jedi Order: Star by Star and the Dark Nest Trilogy.

Troy was one of the founders of Pacesetter Ltd, a game company formed by a group of former TSR, Inc. executives.

== Personal life ==
Denning lives in Lake Geneva, Wisconsin with his wife Andria. He enjoys many hobbies, including skiing, hiking, mountain-climbing, and Kyuki-do -- a form of tae-kwan-do incorporating judo, boxing, and hapki-do.

== Works ==
=== Combat Command ===
- The Omega Rebellion (December 1987)
- Dorsai's Command (with Gordan R. Dixon and Corey Glaberson, March 1989)

=== Dark Sun ===
(listed in order of publication)

- The Verdant Passage (October 1991)
- The Crimson Legion (April 1992)
- The Amber Enchantress (October 1992)
- The Obsidian Oracle (June 1993)
- The Cerulean Storm (September 1993)

=== Forgotten Realms ===
(listed in order of publication)

- Waterdeep (as Richard Awlinson, October 1989)
- Dragonwall (July 1990)
- The Parched Sea (July 1991)
- The Ogre's Pact (September 1994)
- The Giant Among Us (February 1995)
- The Titan of Twilight (September 1995)
- The Veiled Dragon (June 1996)
- Crucible: The Trial of Cyric the Mad (February 1998)
- Faces of Deception (November 1998)
- Beyond the High Road (December 1999)
- Death of the Dragon (written with Ed Greenwood, August 2000)
- The Summoning (March 2001)
- The Siege (December 2001)
- The Sorcerer (November 2002)
- The Sentinel (April, 2014)

=== Halo ===
- Halo: Last Light (September 2015)
- Halo: Retribution (August 2017)
- Halo: Silent Storm (September 2018)
- Halo: Oblivion (September 2019)
- Halo: Shadows of Reach (October 2020)
- Halo: Divine Wind (October 2021)
- Halo: Outcasts (March 2023)
- Halo: Hungry Buzzards (July 2026) - Part of the Halo: Campaign Evolved's Premium Edition
- Operation: METEORITE (July 2026) - Three new missions featured on Halo: Campaign Evolved
- Halo: Fireteam Noble (March 2027)

=== Kim Possible ===
(listed in order of publication)

- Disney's Kim Possible: Tweeb Trouble - Book 9 (2004)
- Disney's Kim Possible: Pick a Villain - Game On (2005)
- Disney's Kim Possible: Pick a Villain - Masters of Mayhem (2005)

=== Planescape ===
- Pages of Pain (December 1997)

=== Stonekeep ===
- The Oath of Stonekeep (October 1999)

=== Star Wars ===
(listed in order of publication)

- Star By Star (October 2001)
- A Forest Apart (February 2003)
- Tatooine Ghost (March 2003)
- The Joiner King (July 2005)
- The Unseen Queen (September 2005)
- The Swarm War (December 2005)
- Tempest (November 2006)
- Inferno (August 2007)
- Invincible (May 2008)
- Abyss (August 2009)
- Vortex (November 2010)
- Apocalypse (March 2012)
- Crucible (July 2013)
