= Tatooine Ghost =

2003 novel by Troy Denning

- Author: Troy Denning
- Language: English
- Series: Canon C
- Subject: Star Wars
- Genre: Science fiction
- Publisher: Del Rey
- Publication date: Hardcover: March 1, 2003; Paperback: December 30, 2003
- Publication place: United States
- Media type: Hardcover & Paperback
- Pages: Hardcover: 416; Paperback: 456
- ISBN: 0-345-45668-8
- Preceded by: A Forest Apart
- Followed by: Heir to the Empire

Tatooine Ghost is a novel by Troy Denning set in the fictional Star Wars expanded universe. The book was released on March 1, 2003.

== Plot ==
The deaths of Darth Vader and Emperor Palpatine, and victory at the Battle of Endor by no means spelled the end of the Empire. In the aftermath, the New Republic has faced a struggle to survive and grow. A new threat looms: a masterpiece of Alderaanian art, lost in transit after the planet's destruction, has resurfaced on the black market. Offered at auction, it will command a handsome price . . . but its value lies in the secret it conceals—the key to a code used to communicate with New Republic agents undercover within the Empire. Discovery of the key by Imperial forces would spell certain disaster. The only option is recovery—and Han Solo, Leia Organa Solo, Chewbacca, and C-3PO have been dispatched to Tatooine to infiltrate the auction.

But trouble is waiting when they arrive: an Imperial Star Destroyer is orbiting Tatooine on the lookout for Rebels; a mysterious stranger at the auction seems to recognize Leia; and an Imperial officer's aggressive bidding for the Alderaanian painting could foil the Solos’ mission. When a dispute erupts into violence, and the painting vanishes in the chaos, Han and Leia are thrust into a desperate race to reclaim it before Imperial troops or a band of unsavory treasure-peddlers get there first.

Dangerous as the chase is, for Leia it leads into especially dark territory. Already haunted by the specter of her infamous father, and fearful that his evil may infect future generations, she has suffered a disturbing Force vision of Luke turning to the dark side. As she battles beside Han against marauding TIE fighters, encroaching stormtroopers, and Tatooine's savage Tusken Raiders, Leia's struggle with the warring emotions inside her culminates in the discovery of an extraordinary link to the past. And as long-buried secrets and truths at last emerge, she faces a moment of reckoning that will forever alter her destiny . . . and that of the New Republic.

== Summary ==
The action takes place four years after the events of Return of the Jedi and directly follows the Star Wars expanded universe book The Courtship of Princess Leia. Han Solo and Princess Leia are recently married. The plot outline is that the Alderaanian moss-painting Killik Twilight was stolen. The painting contains a Rebel code vital to the New Republic's survival, and Han Solo, Chewbacca, C-3PO, and Princess Leia are then sent to retrieve it at an art auction. On the way, Leia finds out some startling things about the past of the Skywalker family when she finds the diary of her grandmother, Shmi.

== Reception ==
SF Site wrote: "Overall the book is a fun, fast adventure that presents Anakin Skywalker in a new light to Princess Leia, which, in turn, lets the reader see things in a new way."

Tatooine Ghost reached #8 on the New York Times bestseller list on March 23, 2003. It also reached #9 on Publishers Weekly's bestseller list.
