= Padmé Amidala =

Star Wars character

- Star Wars character
- Natalie Portman as Padmé Amidala (Note: Revenge of the Sith (2005))
- First appearance: The Phantom Menace (1999)
- Created by: George Lucas
- Portrayed by: Natalie Portman
- Voiced by: Catherine Taber (Note: The Clone Wars film and series Forces of Destiny Various video games); Grey DeLisle (Note: Various cartoons and video games Clone Wars); Montana Norberg (Note: Lego Star Wars: Droid Tales)

In-universe information
- Full name: Padmé Naberrie
- Occupation: Queen of Naboo; Senator of Naboo
- Affiliation: Royal House of Naboo; Galactic Senate
- Spouse: Anakin Skywalker (husband)
- Children: Luke Skywalker (son); Leia Organa (daughter)
- Relatives: Shmi Skywalker (mother-in-law); Han Solo (son-in-law); Ben Solo (grandson); Others in Legends (Note: Padmé's relatives in the Star Wars Legends narrative universe include her granddaughter Jaina Solo and her grandsons Ben Skywalker, Anakin Solo and Jacen Solo.)
- Homeworld: Naboo

Padmé Amidala (/ˈpædmeɪ ˌɑːmɪˈdɑːlə/ PAD-may AH-mih-DAH-lə) is a fictional character in the Star Wars franchise. She first appeared in the 1999 film The Phantom Menace as the teenage queen of the fictional planet Naboo. In the following two films of the prequel trilogy, Padmé becomes a member of the Galactic Senate and secretly marries Anakin Skywalker, a Jedi Knight. Anakin has dreams of Padmé's death, and his fear drives him toward the dark side of the Force, which results in his transformation into Darth Vader. Padmé eventually dies after giving birth to the twins Luke Skywalker and Leia Organa.

Natalie Portman portrays Padmé in all three prequel films. The character also appears in animated series, novels, comics and video games.

== Creation ==
Padmé is introduced in The Phantom Menace (1999), the first film of the prequel trilogy. She is mentioned briefly, however, in the 1983 film Return of the Jedi, the final film of the original trilogy. In this film, Leia tells Luke that she has faint memories of her mother (Padmé), who turns out to be Luke's mother as well. George Lucas, the creator of Star Wars, has explained that although he created a backstory for the mother while writing the original trilogy, it did not make it into the films. He wanted her to be mentioned in Return of the Jedi, however, because he was planning on introducing her as a main character in later films. When Lucas began writing The Phantom Menace, he envisioned similarities between Padmé and Leia, who he described as "the daughter who follows so closely in her [mother's] footsteps."

== Portrayal ==
=== Casting ===
During development of The Phantom Menace, concept artists were given character outlines by Lucasfilm. The fourteen-year-old Padmé was described as similar to Princess Ozma from the Land of Oz series of novels. Lucas, who both wrote and directed the film, wanted to cast a performer who displayed strength comparable to that of Leia, who is a central character in the original trilogy. (Note: Attributed to multiple references:) The filmmakers auditioned over two hundred actresses for the role before selecting Natalie Portman, who was eighteen at the time. One of the concept artists, Iain McCaig, said Portman exhibited vulnerability and strength akin to Ozma.

Portman was enthusiastic about the role, and thought it would be empowering for young female viewers to witness the intelligence and leadership abilities of the teenage monarch. She worked closely with Lucas on her character's accent and mannerisms, and watched the films of Lauren Bacall, Audrey Hepburn, and Katharine Hepburn to draw inspiration from their voice and stature. She was relatively unfamiliar with the Star Wars franchise when she was cast, and watched the original trilogy before filming began.

=== Costumes ===
Lucas has explained that galactic society in the prequel trilogy is more sophisticated than in the original trilogy. To illustrate this difference, the costumes in the prequels are more elaborate than those in the earlier films. Trisha Biggar, the costume designer for the prequel films, said there were only three costumes initially planned for Padmé. However, Lucas felt that a noble of her stature would be constantly changing her wardrobe depending on the occasion. He decided that every time the queen appeared in The Phantom Menace, she would be wearing a different costume. The resulting wardrobe was influenced by fashions from Japan, Mongolia, Tibet and other countries. For Attack of the Clones (2002), Lucas wanted Padmé's garb to reflect the romantic storyline. He requested that her costumes be "skimpy" and "sultry". Padmé's garments were displayed at the Fashion Institute of Design & Merchandising in Los Angeles in 2005, and at the Detroit Institute of Arts in 2018.

=== Reception ===
Portman's performance in the prequel films was criticized in a number of reviews. James Berardinelli called her acting in The Phantom Menace "lackluster," while Annlee Ellingson of Box Office Magazine said her delivery was "stiff and flat, perhaps hindered by the gorgeous but cumbersome costumes." Mike Clark of USA Today complained about the performances of both Portman and Hayden Christensen, who portrays Anakin Skywalker. He wrote, "Both speak in monotone for doubly deadly effect, though when not burdened by his co-star, Christensen often finds the emotion in his limited intonations." Reviewing Revenge of the Sith, Ed Halter of The Village Voice said that "computer-generated characters like wheezing cyborg baddie General Grievous and blippeting fireplug R2-D2 ... emot[ed] more convincingly" than either Portman or Christensen. Mick LaSalle of the San Francisco Chronicle offered a less critical appraisal, describing Portman's portrayal in Revenge of the Sith as "decorative and sympathetic". Despite the criticism, Portman's performances in both Attack of the Clones and Revenge of the Sith earned her nominations for the Saturn Award for Best Actress.

== Appearances ==
=== Prequel trilogy ===
==== The Phantom Menace ====
Padmé makes her first appearance in The Phantom Menace (1999) as the recently-elected fourteen-year-old queen of Naboo. She is dedicated to ending her planet's occupation by the Trade Federation. She negotiates with Federation Viceroy Nute Gunray, who attempts to force her to sign a treaty which would legally allow the Federation's occupation. Padmé escapes from Naboo with the help of Jedi Master Qui-Gon Jinn and his Padawan apprentice Obi-Wan Kenobi. On the way to Coruscant, they are forced to land on Tatooine to repair their ship. Disguised as a handmaiden, Padmé meets the nine-year-old slave boy Anakin Skywalker. She witnesses him win a podrace that both aids her mission to Coruscant and secures his freedom. She and Anakin bond as they journey from Tatooine to Coruscant.

Padmé consults with Senator Palpatine, who encourages her to appeal to the Senate to resolve Naboo's conflict with the Federation. Palpatine, who is secretly the Sith Lord Darth Sidious, persuades her to make a motion to have Supreme Chancellor Valorum removed from office, which enables Palpatine to be elected as his successor. Padmé returns to Naboo to fight for her planet's freedom, enlisting the aid of Jar Jar Binks and the Gungan people. The Gungans create a diversion to lure the Federation's droid armies away from Theed; which has been seized by Gunray. A small force led by Padmé enters the palace and captures Gunray, which ends the occupation of Naboo.

==== Attack of the Clones ====
Padmé returns in Attack of the Clones (2002), which is set ten years after The Phantom Menace. She now represents Naboo in the Galactic Senate and leads a faction opposed to the Military Creation Act that would create an army of clones for the Galactic Republic, which has been threatened by a growing Separatist movement. As she arrives on Coruscant to cast her vote, assassins hired by the Separatists attempt to kill her. Jedi Knight Obi-Wan Kenobi and his apprentice Anakin are assigned to protect Padmé. Palpatine sends Padmé into hiding on Naboo, where she and Anakin struggle to maintain a platonic relationship despite their obvious mutual attraction.

When Anakin has a vision of his mother Shmi in danger, Padmé accompanies him to Tatooine in a failed attempt to rescue her from a band of Tusken Raiders. Anakin returns to Padmé with his mother's body and confesses that he slaughtered the entire Tusken tribe. Padmé is troubled by what Anakin has done, but nevertheless comforts him. After they receive a message from Obi-Wan, Padmé and Anakin go to Geonosis to help him, only to be captured and sentenced to death by the Separatist leader and Sith Lord Count Dooku. Facing execution, Padmé and Anakin profess their love for each other. They are saved from death by an army of Jedi and clone troopers, led by the Jedi Masters Mace Windu and Yoda. The ensuing battle marks the beginning of the Clone Wars. Afterwards, Padmé and Anakin are married in a secret ceremony on Naboo, as marriage is prohibited by the Jedi Code. The wedding is witnessed only by the droids C-3PO and R2-D2.

==== Revenge of the Sith ====
Padmé makes her third film appearance in Revenge of the Sith (2005), which takes place three years after the previous film. As the Clone Wars continue, Padmé informs Anakin that she is pregnant, and he begins having visions of her dying in childbirth. Palpatine plays on Anakin's fears by saying that the dark side of the Force holds the power to save Padmé, which ultimately leads Anakin to become Palpatine's Sith apprentice, Darth Vader. Meanwhile, Padmé watches with increasing suspicion as Palpatine uses the Clone Wars as an excuse to take near-total control of the Senate. As Palpatine transforms the Republic into the Galactic Empire and declares himself Emperor, Padmé remarks: "So this is how liberty dies—with thunderous applause." Obi-Wan Kenobi informs Padmé that Anakin has been seduced to the dark side by Palpatine—who is actually the mastermind of the war—and has killed everyone in the Jedi Temple, including children.

Unable to believe this, Padmé follows Anakin (now Vader) to the volcanic planet Mustafar, where he has gone to assassinate the Separatist leaders. Padmé begs him to escape Palpatine's grasp, but he insists that together they can overthrow Palpatine and rule the galaxy. Padmé recoils in horror and tries to persuade him to abandon the dark side. When Obi-Wan emerges from Padmé's ship, where he had stowed away, Vader accuses Padmé of betrayal and uses the Force to strangle her into unconsciousness. Obi-Wan defeats Vader in a lightsaber duel, then brings Padmé to the secret asteroid base Polis Massa. She dies soon after giving birth to twins, Luke and Leia. Just prior to her death, Padmé insists to Obi-Wan that there is still "good" in Vader. After Padmé is given a state funeral on Naboo, her twins are separated and hidden from Vader and the Empire. Leia is sent to Alderaan to be raised by Senator Bail Organa and his wife Breha. Obi-Wan takes Luke to Tatooine, to be raised by his uncle Owen Lars and his wife Beru.

=== Star Wars: The Clone Wars ===
Padmé appears in the 2008 animated film The Clone Wars, which serves as a pilot episode for the television series of the same name. While Anakin and his apprentice Ahsoka Tano search for Jabba the Hutt's son Rotta, Padmé meets Ziro the Hutt to convince him to side with the Jedi. After Ziro forcibly removes Padmé, she escapes and eavesdrops on his communication with Count Dooku and the Separatists about an elaborate scheme to kill Rotta, frame the Jedi for his murder and force Jabba to attempt revenge, leaving Ziro as the ruler of the Hutts. After Padmé is discovered, Dooku suggests that Ziro collect the bounty placed on her head. C-3PO leads a squad of Coruscant Guard troopers to rescue her. Padmé then contacts Jabba just as the Hutt is about to execute Anakin and Ahsoka, and forces Ziro to confess his betrayal. Padmé negotiates an alliance between the Republic and the Hutts which would allow Republic warships to use Hutt hyperspace lanes. Padmé is voiced by Catherine Taber.

In the series The Clone Wars, Padmé is again voiced by Taber. Padmé is mostly working in the Senate towards a peaceful resolution to the Clone Wars, although a few episodes show her fighting the Separatists alongside Anakin, Ahsoka and Jar Jar Binks. In several episodes she associates with her old colleague Rush Clovis, which causes Anakin to become jealous. Taber also voices Padmé in the web series Forces of Destiny (2017–2018), while Montana Norberg provides her voice in the television miniseries Lego Star Wars: Droid Tales (2015).

=== Novels ===
Padmé is featured in three novels by E. K. Johnston, collectively referred to as the "Queen's Series." The first novel to be released, Queen's Shadow (2018), is set four years after the events of The Phantom Menace. As Padmé ends her reign as queen and becomes a senator, she helps liberate a number of slaves on Tatooine, but is unable to free Anakin's mother, Shmi Skywalker. The novel also explores relationships Padmé has with Rush Clovis, Captain Typho, Captain Panaka, Bail Organa and Chancellor Palpatine. A prequel to Queen's Shadow, titled Queen's Peril (2020) takes place before and during The Phantom Menace. Queen's Hope (2022) chronicles events after Padmé's secret marriage to Anakin. Padmé also appears in flashbacks in the novel Thrawn: Alliances.

== Star Wars Legends ==
Following the acquisition of Lucasfilm by The Walt Disney Company in 2012, most of the licensed Star Wars Expanded Universe material produced between 1977 and 2014 was rebranded as Star Wars Legends and declared non-canon to the franchise. The Legends works comprise a separate narrative universe. (Note: Attributed to multiple references:)

=== Novels and comics ===
Padmé's background prior to her appearance in the prequel films is revealed in Legends novels and comics. In the 2000 comic "A Summer's Dream" from Star Wars Tales 5, Padmé is the Princess of Theed, Naboo's capital city. A young man named Ian Lago falls in love with her, but she places her civic duty over her personal happiness and rejects him. In the novel Cloak of Deception (2001), Naboo's King Veruna is forced to abdicate the throne following accusations of corruption. Padmé is elected queen, and contacts Palpatine to inform him that Veruna has been mysteriously killed. She and Palpatine discuss the events that lead to the Trade Federation blockade of Naboo.

Literature also focuses on Padmé's career as the monarch of Naboo. The young-adult novel Star Wars Episode I Journal: Amidala (1999) depicts Padmé narrowly escaping the Trade Federation. The Queen's Amulet (1999) explores the friendship between Padmé and her handmaiden Sabé immediately before the events of The Phantom Menace. In the short comic "The Artist of Naboo", a young painter features Padmé in his work and later risks his life to save her. Padmé's role in the Delegation of 2000—the senatorial resistance movement to Palpatine's growing absolutism—is discussed in Labyrinth of Evil (2005). The Delegation is concerned with Palpatine's calls for public surveillance and restrictions on freedom of movement and action. Padmé is confident that Palpatine will relinquish his power when the crisis is over.

Padmé appears in stories set after the events of the original trilogy as holograms and flashbacks. The Joiner King (2005), the first book in the Dark Nest trilogy, is set 35 years after Star Wars. Luke discovers a hologram recorded by R2-D2 of Anakin informing Padmé of his vision of her death in childbirth. This is the first time Luke sees an image of his mother. Another hologram depicts a conversation between Padmé and Obi-Wan, and allows Luke and Leia to hear their mother's name for the first time. In the final novel of the trilogy, The Swarm War, Luke and Leia see Padmé's death and their own births.

=== Clone Wars ===
The animated television series Clone Wars is part of the Legends universe. Padmé appears in eight chapters of the series, which aired on Cartoon Network from 2003 to 2005. She is secluded on Coruscant and maintains correspondence with Anakin while he is fighting in the Clone Wars. In one chapter, Padmé is traveling with Yoda when he senses a disturbance in the Force coming from the planet Ilum. Despite Captain Typho's protest, she helps Yoda rescue Jedi Master Luminara Unduli and the Padawan Barriss Offee. In another chapter of the series, she is thrilled by Anakin's graduation to Jedi Knight, and stores his Padawan braid with the necklace he gave her when they first met. Grey DeLisle voices Padmé in the series.

== Family tree ==
Skywalker family tree

Aika Lars (Note: Appears in Pablo Hidalgo's Star Wars Character Encyclopedia: Updated and Expanded (2016))
Beru Whitesun

Cliegg Lars
Owen Lars

Shmi Skywalker-Lars
Anakin Skywalker; Darth Vader
Luke Skywalker

Jobal Naberrie (Note: Attack of the Clones (2002) and Revenge of the Sith (2005))	Ruwee Naberrie
Padmé Amidala	Bail Organa
Leia Organa	Han Solo
Ben Solo; Kylo Ren

House of Organa
Breha Organa

== See also ==
- Skywalker family
