= Shannon McRandle =

American model and makeup artist

- Born: Shannon Lynn Jones; August 28, 1969 (age 56); Killeen, Texas
- Occupations: Model, Makeup artist
- Years active: 1993–present
- Spouses: ? Baksa (m. 1994–1999) Jamie McRandle (m. 2002)
- Children: 3

Shannon Lynn McRandle (Née Jones, born August 28, 1969, in Killeen, Texas) is an American model and makeup artist. In 1999, she gained recognition for her portrayal of the Star Wars character Mara Jade in photographs for the Star Wars card games, having been selected for the role by Decipher, Inc.

In addition to her modeling work, McRandle also works as a commercial hair and makeup stylist, providing services for print and video shoots.

== Early life ==
Born Shannon Lynn Jones on August 28, 1969, in Killeen, Texas, US, to Leonard Jones (stationed at Fort Hood, drafted into the army for the Vietnam War) and Barbara Kubiszewski Walsh. She has two younger half-sisters, Hillary and Adrienne, from her step-father (John Meador). She began modeling at the age of three for department store fashion shows in the Richmond, Virginia area.

== Education and career ==
After high school, she moved to Las Vegas for four years, earning her Bachelor of Arts degree in Communication Studies (1993) from the University of Nevada, Las Vegas, with an emphasis on Public Relations and a minor in Sociology.

Since the age of twelve, McRandle's modeling career included photography shoots, runways, and character modeling. In Las Vegas, she worked as a promotional model at the Las Vegas Convention Center, Bally's Mirage, MGM, and in the Roman Festival at Caesar's Palace. She also worked as a make-up artist in the Hampton Roads and Virginia Beach areas.

== Star Wars ==
Prior to 1998, Mara Jade was a character that existed only as a subject of illustrations created by a variety of artists. These depictions were based solely on written descriptions of the character found within the Star Wars expanded universe novels.

A fan of the franchise, Shannon McRandle auditioned for the opportunity to represent Mara Jade's image when Lucasfilm opted to use a photographic likeness as a model for the character. In 1999, McRandle was photographed for this purpose, known at the time as Shannon Baksa due to her marriage to her first husband in 1994. Lucasfilm subsequently utilized McRandle's likeness for Mara Jade merchandise.

It is worth noting that illustrations of Mara Jade's character made after 1999 may have been influenced by McRandle's physical appearance.

== Personal life ==
Shannon Lynn married United States Navy veteran Jamie McRandle on September 18, 2002. They have three children. She and her family live in Virginia Beach, Virginia.

In 2013, Shannon McRandle was diagnosed with Ankylosing Spondylitis and Stage 3 Rectal Cancer. The cancer is in remission, but the radiation and chemo caused severe osteoporosis in her back and hips, and resulted in a severely-weakened immune system as well as several other medical issues. None of the AS treatments were successful.
