= The Verdant Passage =

1991 novel by Troy Denning

- Cover art by Brom, 1991
- Author: Troy Denning
- Cover artist: Brom
- Language: English
- Series: Prism Pentad
- Genre: Fantasy novel
- Published: 1991
- Publication place: United States
- Media type: Print (Paperback)
- Pages: 341
- ISBN: 9781560761211
- Followed by: The Crimson Legion

The Verdant Passage is a fantasy novel based on the Dungeons & Dragons role-playing game and set in the world of the Dark Sun campaign. It was written by Troy Denning and published by TSR in 1991.

== Plot summary ==
A party of adventurers, each with their own objectives, work together against the evil sorcerer-king known as Kalak of Tyr, who is trying to transform himself into a deadly and immortal dragon.

== Publication history ==
In 1991, TSR published a new setting for the Dungeons & Dragons role-playing game, the post-apocalyptic Dark Sun campaign set on the desert world of Athas. As part of the promotional support for the setting, TSR also published a series of five novels set on Athas, beginning with The Verdant Passage, a 341-page mass market paperback written by Troy Denning, with cover art by Brom. It was the first book in Denning's five-part "Prism Pentad":

1. The Verdant Passage
2. The Crimson Legion (1992)
3. The Amber Enchantress (1992)
4. The Obsidian Oracle (1993)
5. The Cerulean Storm (1993)

== Reception ==
The Verdant Passage was #6 on CBR's 2020 "10 Of The Best DnD Stories To Start Off With" list — the article states that "The reason for this novel's recommendation is more than it just provides a great introduction to the world of Athas. The novel's heroes also provide a great framework for making a party that includes neutral and evil characters."

== Other reviews ==
- Amazing Stories, March 1992 (Review by Charles Von Rospach)
- Kliatt
