= The Parched Sea =

1991 novel by Troy Denning

- Author: Troy Denning
- Cover artist: Fred Fields
- Language: English
- Series: The Harpers
- Genre: Fantasy novel
- Publisher: TSR
- Publication date: July 1991
- Publication place: United States
- Media type: Print (Paperback)
- Pages: 310 pp
- ISBN: 1-56076-067-2
- Followed by: Elfshadow

The Parched Sea is the first novel in the Harpers series, set in the Forgotten Realms campaign setting. The book was written by Troy Denning.

== Plot summary ==
The Parched Sea is another name for the desert Anauroch in which the novel takes place.

The Zhentarim, determined to drive a trade route through Anauroch, send an army to enslave the nomads of the Great Desert. Ruha, an outcast witch, tries to gain the trust of the Sheikh as tribe after tribe fall to the Zhentarim. The Harpers send an agent to counter the Zhentarim, and Ruha helps this stranger win the Sheikh's trust, so that he can overcome the tribes' ancestral rivalries and drive the invaders from the desert.

== Release details ==
- 1991, USA, TSR (ISBN 1-56076-067-2), Pub Date ? July 1991, Paperback

== Reviews ==
- Magia i Miecz #59 (November 1998) (Polish)
