= The New Jedi Order =

Series of Star Wars novels

Cover of the first volume

Star Wars: The New Jedi Order (or New Jedi Order or NJO) is a series of 19 science fiction novels, published from 1999 to 2003, set in the Star Wars Expanded Universe. The series revolves around the Yuuzhan Vong invasion of the galaxy 21–25 years after the events depicted in Return of the Jedi. The New Jedi Order was the restored and reformed Jedi organization, following the Great Jedi Purge and subsequent fall of the Galactic Empire. The Jedi Knights, reduced in number to only a handful, were slowly restored, primarily under the leadership of Luke Skywalker. Additional related stories were published, some as e-book novellas (as recently as 2006) and others as comic books (as recent as 2010/2011); these increase the total number of published NJO-related stories to 26. The authors that contributed to the series include R.A. Salvatore, Michael Stackpole, James Luceno, Michael Jan Friedman, Troy Denning, Matthew Stover, Kathy Tyers, Greg Keyes, Elaine Cunningham, Aaron Allston, Walter Jon Williams, and Sean Williams & Shane Dix.

Following Disney's acquisition of Lucasfilm, in 2014, most existing Star Wars spin-off works—including those related to The New Jedi Order—were declared non-canon and rebranded as 'Legends'.

== Plot ==
The series begins 21 years after the Rebel Alliance destroyed the Second Death Star. The New Republic is facing internal conflict while trying to maintain peace. A new, powerful enemy, known as the Yuuzhan Vong, emerges from the outer galaxy, beginning what will be known as the Yuuzhan Vong invasion. The Jedi, along with the New Republic, struggle to resist this new alien race while it steadily pushes forward, annihilating or occupying different parts of the galaxy.

=== Character arcs ===
As the longest continuous series of novels in the Expanded Universe, the NJO was able to establish several long-term character arcs. Many new or previously underused characters were put into the spotlight and were developed extensively over the course of the series.

- Ganner Rhysode: Rhysode began the series as an arrogant young Jedi, a trait best shown when, on assignment with Corran Horn, he mocked Horn’s inability to use telekinesis, claiming that this made him a lesser Jedi. Rhysode gradually became more humble over the course of the series, especially after watching many of his friends die on the mission to Myrkr. After Jacen Solo was captured during this mission, Rhysode went searching for him, even though, in Jacen’s words, "we weren't even friends"; Rhysode died fighting thousands of Yuuzhan Vong warriors so that Jacen and Vergere could escape. It was foreseen that in the future, the Yuuzhan Vong would eventually worship a new god called “the Ganner”, who guarded the entrance of the Yuuzhan Vong realm of the dead, referring admiringly, to Rhysode’s last stand.
- Tahiri Veila: Not fully developed in her original role—Anakin Solo's friend from Junior Jedi Knights—Tahiri was pushed to a starring role in the NJO. When the Yuuzhan Vong captured Yavin 4, a new Jedi training base, she was taken prisoner and subjected to experiments designed to create a Vong-human hybrid. Anakin eventually rescued her, which stirred the romantic feelings they had had for years;. When Anakin died above Myrkr, Tahiri was devastated. At this time, the Yuuzhan Vong personality implanted in her began to periodically take control, and Tahiri would wrestle with this for the duration of the series. Unlike most of the other Jedi, she had a peculiar empathy with the Yuuzhan Vong. At the end of the series, she chose to stay on Zonama Sekot to continue learning about the Yuuzhan Vong and help them build a better society.
- Jacen Solo: Jacen underwent perhaps the most complete and controversial arc of the NJO. He began the series as someone who actively questioned whether it was right to use the Force as a weapon. After being captured by the Yuuzhan Vong he withstood weeks of torture at the hands of Vergere, an Old Republic Jedi and Vong familiar. He emerged with a new view of the Force, including a willingness to use it offensively. During the battle to retake Coruscant, Jacen achieved a state of oneness with the Force that gave him a “perfect mastery.”

Many major characters die within the series. In several New Jedi Order books, the characters who die seem to be important in the novels. The books also revealed the death of some major characters in the Star Wars universe that were not introduced in the movie trilogies. In Vector Prime, Chewbacca dies saving Anakin on the planet Sernpidal, which causes some friction between Anakin and his father Han.

== Development ==
In 1998, Sue Rostoni, managing editor for Lucas Licensing, and Shelly Shapiro, editorial director for Del Rey Books, joined with novelist James Luceno to plot The New Jedi Order series. Spanning 19 novels, it became the longest-running Star Wars book series. "We created a series bible that coordinated the story arcs, a database for new characters and continuity that was passed out to writers who were hired to do the work." said Luceno, "We are mindful that we're playing in George Lucas' backyard, but everyone who has written for the franchise has contributed something."

The Yuuzhan Vong species was based on the character Nom Anor, introduced in the Dark Horse Comics series Crimson Empire; he subsequently appeared in several New Jedi Order titles.

Vector Prime, the first book in the series, received much controversy for the death of Chewbacca (the first and only time a major film character has been killed off in the now non-canon Star Wars Expanded Universe), despite George Lucas's approval. The concept of killing such a character was the decision of the book editors (said to include Randy Stradley, then an editor at Dark Horse Comics), who sent a list of characters they would like to kill to Lucas, with Luke Skywalker at the top of the list. The response was what characters they could not kill, and Chewbacca was not on the list, hence his selection. Opinion was sharply divided as to whether this death of a beloved character was an effort to boost sales and interest in the new series, or if it served the dramatic purpose of declaring that not even the core characters were necessarily "safe" anymore. Either way, it was this book with this plot point that was a key factor in Disney's decision to revoke the canonical status of the Expanded Universe.

Mark Hamill reprised his role as Luke Skywalker in a commercial for Vector Prime. He had a speaking role in which he, as Luke, recalled his previous struggles and talks of how he was unsure he could defeat this new threat, the Yuuzhan Vong.

In January 2025, Variety reported that a film entitled "Star Wars: New Jedi Order" starring Daisy Ridley and directed by Sharmeen Obaid-Chinoy, was in development.

== Media ==
Year	Name	Author	Notes
1999	Vector Prime (Note: In 1999, Mark Hamill reprised his role as Luke Skywalker in a speaking role for a TV commercial ( Video on YouTube ) for the novel, in which Luke recalls the state that the galaxy is in at the present, compared to the times of the Empire.)	R. A. Salvatore	
2000	Dark Tide I: Onslaught	Michael Stackpole	
–	Dark Tide: Siege	Michael Stackpole	canceled
2000	Dark Tide II: Ruin	Michael Stackpole	
2000	Agents of Chaos I: Hero’s Trial	James Luceno	
2000	Agents of Chaos II: Jedi Eclipse	James Luceno	
2000	Balance Point	Kathy Tyers	
2002	Emissary of the Void	Greg Keyes	short story
–	Knightfall I: Jedi Storm	Michael Jan Friedman	canceled
–	Knightfall II: Jedi Blood	Michael Jan Friedman	canceled
–	Knightfall III: Jedi Fire	Michael Jan Friedman	canceled
2001	Recovery (set during Edge of Victory I: Conquest)	Troy Denning	e-book novella
2001	Edge of Victory I: Conquest	Greg Keyes	
2001	Edge of Victory II: Rebirth	Greg Keyes	
2001	Star by Star	Troy Denning	
2002	Dark Journey	Elaine Cunningham	
2002	The Apprentice (set during Dark Journey)	Elaine Cunningham	short story
2002	Enemy Lines I: Rebel Dream	Aaron Allston	
2002	Enemy Lines II: Rebel Stand	Aaron Allston	
2002	Traitor	Matthew Stover	
2002	Destiny's Way	Walter Jon Williams	
2002	Ylesia (set during Destiny's Way)	Walter Jon Williams	e-book novella
2003	Force Heretic I: Remnant	Sean Williams & Shane Dix	
2003	Force Heretic II: Refugee	Sean Williams & Shane Dix	
2003	Or Die Trying	Sean Williams & Shane Dix	short story
2003	Force Heretic III: Reunion	Sean Williams & Shane Dix	
2003	The Final Prophecy	Greg Keyes	
2003	The Unifying Force	James Luceno	

=== Vector Prime ===
Star Wars: The New Jedi Order – Vector Prime was written by American writer R. A. Salvatore and published in 1999. Upon its release, the book was featured on the New York Times Hardcover Bestseller List.

The alien race known as the Yuuzhan Vong are preparing for their invasion on the Star Wars galaxy by covertly disrupting the fragile peace established by the fledgling New Republic. The Praetorite Vong establish a base on the frozen backwater world of Helska IV. They are noticed by the ExGal-4 base on the nearby world of Belkaden, which is infiltrated by a Yuuzhan Vong agent named Yomin Carr who is readying the planet for Vong habitation by poisoning the world. The Skywalker-Solo family, unaware of the Yuuzhan Vong threat, visit Lando Calrissian at his industrious planet of Dubrillion. Lando asks Luke Skywalker and his wife Mara Jade to investigate what is happening on the world of Belkaden with R2-D2. When they go, Mara fights Yomin Carr and kills him, despite the sickness the Yuuzhan Vong gave her through their agent, Nom Anor.

Meanwhile, Han Solo, his son Anakin Solo, and Chewbacca go to the planet Sernpidal to pick up some cargo. When they arrive, they find that the Praetorite Vong plan to destroy the planet by pulling its moon Dobido into it. Han, Chewbacca, and Anakin save as many people as they can aboard the Millennium Falcon, but Chewbacca is accidentally left behind and dies as Dobido crashes into Sernpidal.

The final battle against the Praetorite Vong occurs when Jacen Solo senses a call in the Force from scientist Danni Quee. He takes his sister, Jaina, with him to rescue her, aided with forces from the New Republic. Once Jacen and Danni return, the New Republic destroys Helska IV and the majority of the Praetorite Vong are destroyed in this explosion; the New Republic has beaten this alien menace. However, the main Yuuzhan Vong invasion force has not yet even appeared in the galaxy. The novel ends with the Skywalker-Solos returning to Sernpidal so that Han can give Chewbacca's eulogy in the wake of his sacrifice.

=== Dark Tide I: Onslaught ===
Dark Tide: Onslaught (also released as Dark Tide I: Onslaught) is the first novel in a two-part story by Michael A. Stackpole, published in 2000.

The novel begins right after the Second Battle of Helska. With the help of the New Republic military Leia Solo, her daughter Jaina, and Danni Quee all help forces around the Outer Rim territories unite against the Yuuzhan Vong. Luke Skywalker takes Jacen Solo with him to Belkaden to find the Yuuzhan Vong. While they are there Jacen has a vision of himself saving many people by killing various Vong warriors. He interprets the vision as a sign that he needs to free the Yuuzhan Vong's slaves, but he is captured. Luke rescues Jacen and they go to Dantooine, where Anakin Solo, Jacen's brother, and Mara are searching for a cure for the Vong disease.

Meanwhile, two Jedi Knights Corran Horn and Ganner Rhysode are sent on a mission to Bimmiel to find missing university students that were taken by the Yuuzhan Vong. Corran and Ganner save the students but Corran is severely wounded by Yuuzhan Vong warriors. The novel culminates in the Battle of Dantooine. Luke kills the Vong War Coordinator and releases the slaves. New Republic fleets started to evacuate the remaining Dantooine refugees. On Bimmiel, the Yuuzhan Vong, who are led by Commander Shedao Shai, discover the two dead Yuuzhn Vong warriors that Corran killed and he vows to kill the Jedi who killed his warriors.

=== Dark Tide II: Ruin ===
Dark Tide: Ruin (also released as Dark Tide II: Ruin) is the second novel of Stackpole's two-part story, published in 2000.

=== Agents of Chaos I: Hero's Trial ===
Agents of Chaos I: Hero's Trial is the first book in a two-part story arc by James Luceno, published by Del Rey in 2000.

The Yuuzhan Vong decide to send Priestess Elan to infiltrate the Jedi, along with the Priestess' pet and familiar Vergere. She poses as a defector from the Vong. However, she carries lethal bo'tous spores (a bio-weapon developed by Nom Anor) in her lungs that she plans to unleash on as many Jedi as she can. Han Solo, still grieving over Chewbacca's death, isolates himself from his friends and family, and reconnects with his smuggler mentor, Roa. He tells Han about a new galactic party called the Peace Brigade who help the Yuuzhan Vong against the New Republic. Reck Desh, a smuggler Han has connections to, is a leader of a Peace Brigade cell; to find Desh, Han and Roa travel to the Jubilee Wheel, a space station orbiting the planet Ord Mantell. Once there, they learn that Reck Desh's next operation will be at Bilbringi.

The Jubilee Wheel is soon attacked by one of the Vong's creature-weapons, an ychna. Han escapes with Droma, a member of the Ryn species, and several other people. Han then lands on Ord Mantell and boards the pleasure yacht Queen of Empire since it is heading to Bilbringi; Elan and Vergere are aboard the same yacht. At Bilbringi, Desh's Peace Brigade forces attack the pleasure yacht and attempt to kidnap Elan and Vergere who he believes are traitors to the Vong. Han and Droma guard Elan and Vergere, but Desh nevertheless captures them and leaves Han and Droma to die.

Back aboard the Queen of Empire, Han and Droma survive Resh's attempt to kill them. They then go after Desh's ship, only to find everyone dead aside from Elan and Vergere. Elan tries to kill Han by using the last of her bo'tous spores, but both she and Han stumble into a sealed room. Han pulls on a breathing mask that protects him against the spores while Elan dies. Vergere gives Han a vial of her tears, which will heal Mara from her disease. Vergere then runs away in an escape pod. After the New Republic is informed of Elan's deceit, Han agrees to help Droma find his family.

=== Agents of Chaos II: Jedi Eclipse ===
Agents of Chaos II: Jedi Eclipse is the second book in a two-part story arc by James Luceno, published by Del Rey in 2000.

The novel focuses around several stories that eventually intertwine in the climax. Han Solo and Droma, seeking Droma's displaced family throughout the war-torn galaxy. They go to the planet Ruan, and learn about a plot to destroy all servant droids in order to appease the Yuuzhan Vong. Han and Droma foil this plan, and one of the droids tells Han what the Vong's next target planet is.

The Yuuzhan Vong have allied with the Hutt Empire for more convenient invasions. However, the Hutts are double-crossing the Vong to the New Republic, and are spying on the Vong, but they know of the Hutts' betrayal and are intentionally misleading their allies. Two supposed targets are Corellia and Bothawui. The latter is heavily fortified in defense of an invasion while the former is set to appear nearly defenseless, but has a secret weapon at its side: Centerpoint Station. The station can only be activated through Anakin Solo's DNA since he shut Centerpoint down years earlier. In order to counter the Yuuzhan Vong's relentless invasion of the galaxy, Ambassador Leia Organa Solo bids the Hapes Consortium to join the war against the Vong. Queen Mother Tenenial Djo and her husband Prince Isolder agree to this despite the reluctance of other influential parties within the Consortium, and they arm their military to fight the Vong.

Ultimately, the Yuuzhan Vong's next target planet isn't either Corellia or Bothawui, but the shipyards of Fondor. The Hutts openly betray the Vong as a result and fully side with the combined forces of the New Republic and Hapes Consortium. However, Centerpoint Station is already activated, and even though Anakin Solo refuses to use it, his ambitious first cousin, Thrackan Sal-Solo, uses it to fire right into the Fondor system. Though it decimates two-thirds of the Vong forces, it's also a tragedy for the New Republic and Hapes forces alike. Nevertheless, the Battle of Fondor is considered a victory for the New Republic, and Droma reunites with his family. But the Hapes Consortium backs out of the war and Tenenial Djo miscarries her next child due to the disturbance she felt through the Force as a result of all the lives suddenly lost thanks to Centerpoint. The surviving refugees in the aftermath of Fondor, including Droma and his family, are transported to Duro as a safe haven from the Vong.

=== Balance Point ===
Balance Point was written by Kathy Tyers and published in 2000.

On the planet Duro, a new galactic refugee settlement close to the Core, Jacen Solo has a horrifying vision about the fate of the galaxy. Amidst the invasion by the Yuuzhan Vong, anger and darkness will become the ultimate enemy of one pivotal individual in the war, and if Jacen embraces such evil, then the galaxy will fall. In order to avoid such catastrophe, Jacen decides to turn his back on the Force forever. However a ray of hope shines in the conceiving of Luke and Mara Jade Skywalker's child.

Duro eventually becomes the next target of the Yuuzhan Vong. Though the conquest of the world is successful, Jacen confronts the Vong Warmaster Tsavong Lah; he embraces the Force once more, and defeats him. The Skywalkers, the Solos, and several of their friends and allies flee Duro in its loss. Tsavong Lah makes an ultimatum to the rest of the galaxy: if every single member of the Jedi are brought to the Yuuzhan Vong, especially Jacen, then the invaders will end their invasion with Duro as their last planet.

=== Edge of Victory I: Conquest ===
Edge of Victory: Conquest (also released as Edge of Victory I: Conquest) is the first novel in a two-part story by Greg Keyes, published in 2001.

Following the events of Balance Point, the Yuuzhan Vong have agreed to halt their galactic invasion in exchange for all of the Jedi being brought to them. One of the Vong's targets is the Jedi praxeum on Yavin 4. Anakin Solo travels to Yavin 4 in order to help his fellow Jedi escape. He helps the Jedi escape the Peace Brigade but his best friend, Tahiri Veila, is captured. He decides to go back for her, and enlists Vua Rapuung, a Shamed Yuuzhan Vong, for help. Rapuung teams up with Anakin so that Anakin will get to save Tahiri while Rapuung gets revenge on the shaper who shamed him. Tahiri is tortured and brainwashed by Master Shaper Mezhan Kwaad and her assistant Nen Yim into believing that she is a Yuuzhan Vong warrior. Anakin and Rapuung later arrive at the shaper damutek that replaced the Jedi praxeum. Disguised to infiltrate the compound, Anakin is able to replace the destroyed crystal of his lightsaber with one of the Vong's own lambents (light-creatures). With this, Anakin is now able to sense the Yuuzhan Vong in a whole new way.

Mezhan Kwaad and Nen Yim's are taken to a ship to be transported off of Yavin 4. Anakin and Rapuung make their move; Kwaad is able to mortally wound Rapuung and injure Anakin, but then the brainwashed Tahiri decapitates Kwaad. Anakin then guides Tahiri back to her senses by reminding her who she is and expressing his love for her. As a token of his gratitude of helping him defeat Kwaad, Rapuung sacrifices himself so Anakin and Tahiri can escape. They, along with the other non-Vong occupants of Yavin 4, are soon rescued and transported out of the system. The novel ends with Nen Yim promising herself to continue Mezhan Kwaad's work in order to help the Yuuzhan Vong.

=== Edge of Victory II: Rebirth ===
Edge of Victory: Rebirth (also released as Edge of Victory II: Rebirth) is the second novel in Keyes's two-part story, published in 2001. It focuses several intersecting stories.

Anakin Solo, Tahiri Veila, and Corran Horn escape Yuuzhan Vong supporters on Eridau. They end up in the midst of a Yuuzhan Vong fleet. They infiltrate one of the Vong's ships and end up in the Yag'Dhul system. After a brief battle, they escape the Vong's midst to rendezvous with the indigenous population. Meanwhile, Luke and his wife are declared as fugitives by the New Republic under Yuuzhan Vong pressure. Mara is pregnant and the deadly coomb spore virus threatens to kill her and the child. With help from the Jedi and the Errant Venture, they escape to Coruscant.

Back to Anakin, Tahiri, and Corran, a much larger invasion of Yag'Dhul soon comes, led by Nom Anor. The invasion fails in light of the overall Vong fleet having to leave and deal with another problem. That other problem is Jaina Solo who is after the Vong's giant superweapon. She destroys the superweapon, which is on Sernpidal, and this prompted the invasion fleet at Yag'Dhul to pull back to help the defending forces at Sernpidal. However, Jaina discovers that this superweapon was merely a developing worldship that had no Yuuzhan Vong warriors, only civilians.

Another story focuses on Master Shaper Nen Yim defying protocol in an attempt to save a dying worldship. Kae Kwaad reveals himself to be the Shamed One Onimi, the familiar of the Yuuzhan Vong's Supreme Overlord Shimrra Jamaane. Shimrra, despite knowing of Yim's heresy, allows her to continue her heretical protocols to further the Vong's war efforts. However, Yim soon drops her efforts in trying to save the doomed worldship. The end of novel focuses on Jacen Solo reconciling with his father, Han and Luke and Mara's child Ben Skywalker being born.

=== Star by Star ===
Star by Star was written by Troy Denning and published in 2001. The book reached #11 on the New York Times bestseller list on November 18, 2001.

In this dark and dangerous time for the New Republic, the cruel Yuuzhan Vong continue their mission: galactic conquest. The Yuuzhan Vong have begun cloning voxyn, creatures capable of hunting Jedi through the Force and killing them. Former Chief of State Leia Organa Solo faces a difficult crisis; the Yuuzhan Vong want to know the location of the secret Jedi base, and if the New Republic does not provide this information within one week, they will violently destroy millions of refugee ships.

As the Jedi Knights mourn the victims of the voxyn, Anakin Solo prepares a dangerous plan. He will lead a strike force made of his Force-adept friends into the core of an enemy worldship over Myrkr in attempt to kill the original voxyn. There, he will come into contact with evil, sorrow, the destiny of the New Republic ... and himself. The book also saw the creation of the deadly YVH 1 Droids that were built as a response to the Yuuzhan Vong invasion and the Fall of Coruscant.

The Jedi find themselves in considerable danger when the Yuuzhan Vong unleash feral creatures called voxyn on them. These voxyn are aggressive, intelligent, and extremely difficult to kill, and worst of all for the Jedi, they can hunt through the Force and have been engineered specifically to hunt down Jedi. Leia Organa Solo captures one such beast but not before she is severely wounded. It is then discovered that all voxyn are clones of an original genetically modified beast native to Myrkr, the location of the Yuuzhan Vong voxyn cloning facility. In order to foil the threat posed by the voxyn, Anakin Solo and the Jedi Council consider sending a specialized all-Jedi strike team to take out the cloning facility. The idea faced some resistance, mainly from Han Solo who rightly believed that the mission was dangerous and was unwilling to send all three of his children right into Yuuzhan Vong territory. Ultimately, the choice was Luke Skywalker's, who is currently leading the Jedi, who thought that it was their only chance and volunteered himself for the mission. Anakin rejected his offer on the grounds that he was too valuable to the New Republic and the Jedi, as well as being too important and strong for the Yuuzhan Vong to consider taking alive. Instead, Anakin volunteers himself and others follow his lead. The final group comprises Anakin, Ulaha Kore, Jacen Solo, Jaina Solo, Tenel Ka Djo, Zekk, Tahiri Veila and Alema Rar among others.

While the initial part of the mission goes smoothly, things begin to get out of hand once the team landed on the worldship orbiting Myrkr. While they are there, they are repeatedly ambushed by voxyn and Yuuzhan Vong warriors commanded by Nom Anor and Vergere. They also run into Nightsister Lomi Plo and her Shadow Academy apprentice Welk. After some debate, Anakin decides that Lomi Plo and Welk should join them, although Zekk predicts that they will be double-crossed by the Dark Jedi.

There are several casualties along the way to the original or 'queen' voxyn, but the biggest blow falls when Anakin is injured. Already weary and injured, the Jedi soon come under attack once again and although they escape, the damage to Anakin has already been done. They soon learn that Welk and Lomi Plo have made off with the spacecraft Anakin had intended to use for their getaway, taking with them Raynar Thul, an old friend of Jaina and Jacen. This effectively means that the group are stranded aboard the worldship with a worsening Anakin. Anakin soon realizes that his condition would result in the entire group's death. He dies later fighting off many Yuuzhan Vong, destroying all of the voxyn cloning samples, and buying the time his comrades needed in order to escape the Yuuzhan Vong. His death is felt by his uncle Luke Skywalker and his mother Leia Solo, the former noting that before his death, Anakin had already become one with the Force. Before his death, he leaves his brother Jacen in charge of their group.

After a brief period of mourning during which tensions within the group rise, Jacen and Jaina decided to split up. Jaina wants to retrieve her brother's body while Jacen decides to finish off their original mission; the killing of the voxyn queen. On his way there, he meets the mysterious Vergere who shows him the way to the voxyn queen whom he fights and defeats. After this, she turns on him and delivers him right into the waiting hands of the Yuuzhan Vong.

Jaina, meanwhile, has successfully retrieved her brother's body and reluctantly leads what is left of their group off of the Myrkr worldship via a stolen Vong frigate, leaving Jacen behind with the Yuuzhan Vong. Before her departure, she has already begun to show signs of dark side tendencies that rose from the loss of Anakin.

The Yuuzhan Vong warfleet attacks Coruscant from the OboRin Comet Cluster, having assembled at such staging positions like Borleias. They use refugee ships containing prisoners from earlier battles to shield the Vong fleet. Even with the efforts of legendary leaders such as General Garm Bel Iblis (commanding Fleet Group Two), Admiral Traest Kre'fey (commanding Fleet Group One), General Wedge Antilles (commanding Fleet Group Three), Supreme Commander Sien Sovv, and Jedi Master Luke Skywalker, the Yuuzhan Vong are too plentiful to be thwarted. It was said that the Vong fleet numbered "tens of thousands", and that half of the New Republic space navy was present. Chief of State Borsk Fey'lya made Admiral Sovv command the battle in front of a full session of the Senate. As a result, the New Republic forces have no effective overall strategy, and discipline breaks down. When Sovv orders that the fleet hold their fire in order to not hit the refugee ships, Iblis flat out ignores him, and his Fleet Group operate solely under his command for the rest of the battle attacking the Yuuzhan Vong head on and suffering enormous casualties. The refugee ships, which are piloted by Yuuzhan Vong, are deliberately smashed into Coruscant's shields to weaken them. This tactic works, as eventually whole shield-grids fails, and the surface shield-generators explodes. Coruscant does have extensive mine fields, but these doesn't have quite as large an impact as desired—the defenders at Coruscant disable the mines to avoid slaughtering the refugees. The Vong also use the refugee ships to batter the city planet's surface, causing terrible damage below. Even the orbital defense platforms could not stop the advance of the Yuuzhan Vong. Soon Coruscant's skyline is burning with crashing vessels and plasma fire from the battle above. Even Orbital Defense Headquarters is crippled, and falls out of orbit to the surface. During the battle, Luke Skywalker and other Jedi from the Eclipse base target the enemy war coordinating yammosks, and manage to destroy four of them.

Meanwhile, Han and Leia Solo, aboard the Millennium Falcon, attempt to rescue Chief of State Borsk Fey'lya, but are tasked with rescuing Luke Skywalker and Mara Jade Skywalker. The second assault wave are thousands of yorik-trema dropships, tsik-seru airskimmers, swarms of yorik-vec assault cruisers and coralskippers, rakamat and fire breather walkers, legions of Yuuzhan Vong warriors and Chazrach support troops. In desperation, the New Republic military fire on the hostage refugee ships but to no avail. At the Imperial Palace, Tsavong Lah's aide Romm Zqar tries to force Borsk Fey'lya to surrender. When he refuses, he is killed. But before the Chief of State died, he has planted a bomb in the Imperial Palace triggered by his heartbeat. This resultes in the deaths of the Chief of State, 25,000 Yuuzhan Vong warriors, the destruction of a portion of the Imperial Palace, many surrounding buildings, and several Yuuzhan Vong vessels. Prior to his death, Fey'lya had ordered the data towers to be destroyed to prevent valuable information from getting into the hands of the Yuuzhan Vong.

The battle lasts for several days with heavy casualties on both sides. Many of its citizens are forced to flee the former capital world of the New Republic while those who do not manage to escape are forced to flee into the city-planet's lower levels. Many Senators, fearing for their lives, commandeer bits of the fleet and escape to their sectors as the battle progresses. The New Republic navy is somewhat diminished as a result. Some think that if this had not happened, then the New Republic might have won the battle. The third wave was a biotoxin in the form of green algae released by the Yuuzhan Von which devoured many of the buildings, including dead bodies, and the algae also left behind black spots. Coralskipper and yorik-vec squadrons bombed the devastated city world causing damage to the defenders. The Yuuzhan Vong eventually captures Coruscant and have it terraformed and rename Yuuzhan'tar after their primordial homeworld. Overall, the Yuuzhan Vong win because of their utter ruthlessness.

=== Dark Journey ===
Dark Journey was written by Elaine Cunningham and published in 2002. Cunningham commented in an interview that the story is a personal one focusing on a difficult time in Jaina's life. The book reached #11 on the New York Times bestseller list on February 17, 2002.

The Yuuzhan Vong have claimed Coruscant as their new capital and the survivors of the battle of the planet, including the Skywalkers and the Solos, escape to rendezvous with other survivors within the Hapes Consortium. Meanwhile, in the Myrkr system, Jaina Solo and the survivors of the mission to exterminate the voxyn escape aboard a captured Yuuzhan Vong frigate named the Ksstar in order to meet up with Jaina's family on Hapes. On the Ksstar's heels is Khalee Lah, the fanatical warrior son of Vong Warmaster Tsavong Lah, and his charge, Priest Harrar. Their pursuit of Jaina and her comrades convinces Jaina to rename the captured Vong ship the Trickster in order to play mind games on the invaders; as one of their goddesses, Yun-Harla, is a trickster, Jaina's audacity is looked upon as blasphemy. As this happens, the Skywalkers and Solos' Jedi friends sense Jacen Solo's death, although, strangely enough, Jacen's family members themselves do not sense this.

On Hapes, Jaina's dead brother, Anakin, is given a proper funeral by cremation. Meanwhile, former Hapan Queen Mother Ta'a Chume sees how weak are the current Queen Mother and her daughter-in-law, Tenenial Djo. Since the Hapans had suffered a grievous loss about a year earlier against the Yuuzhan Vong at Fondor, that event sent waves of loss and pain into the Force-sensitive Tenenial that caused her to miscarry her unborn child. As a result, Tenenial became weak, both physically and emotionally from the trauma of the experience. So Ta'a Chume looks to find a replacement for the Queen Mother. Tenenial's own daughter, Tenel Ka, is an unlikely replacement due to her Jedi and warrior heritage. Jaina, on the other hand, in the midst of her brothers' losses and her anger and hatred for the Yuuzhan Vong, displays a commanding air about her that makes her a potential candidate to replace Tenenial Djo.

Meanwhile, Jaina, with the help of Kyp Durron and Jagged Fel, fights back against the combined forces of the Yuuzhan Vong and their supporters. However, these experiences begin to pull Jaina closer to the dark side of the Force, just like her grandfather, Anakin Skywalker. In the end, however, with the help of her friends and family, Jaina overcomes the temptations of the dark side, remembers her place as a Jedi, and rejects Ta'a Chume's offer to become the next Hapan Queen Mother. Instead, in the wake of Tenenial Djo's mysterious death by poison, Tenel Ka assumes the throne in time to combat the incoming Vong fleet.

As for Khalee Lah and Harrar, the former's experience in combating Jaina has driven him to feel such shame and self-loathing that Harrar assists in his suicide. The priest himself wonders whether or not Jaina herself is the human avatar of Yun-Harla.

=== Enemy Lines I: Rebel Dream ===
Enemy Lines: Rebel Dream (also released as Enemy Lines I: Rebel Dream) is the first novel in a two-part story by Aaron Allston, published in March 2002. It reached #7 on the New York Times bestseller list on April 14, 2002.

Following the Yuuzhan Vong's capture of Coruscant, General Wedge Antilles, leading New Republic Fleet Group Two, successfully capture and intend to hold the Vong-held world of Borleias. This becomes convenient for the New Republic Senators, under unofficial leadership from Councilor Pwoe, to gather up their resources in order to find a new capital for the Republic. Later, after the actions they took within the Hapes Consortium, Jaina Solo, Kyp Durron, and Jagged Fel become part of the occupation force of Borleias, and Jaina and Jag begin to develop a romantic relationship as a result of their time together fighting the Vong in the solar system. As the fighting in the Borleias system increases, it attracts the expertise of Supreme Commander Czulkang Lah, father of Warmaster Tsavong Lah, who soon becomes Wedge Antilles's enemy in the occupation of Borleias.

Meanwhile, Luke Skywalker senses a dark presence on Yuuzhan Vong-held Coruscant that has nothing to do with the Vong themselves. So he organizes a strike team consisting of himself, his wife Mara, Tahiri Veila, and Wraith Squadron in order to infiltrate Coruscant and then find and eliminate the dark presence there. With help from Lando Calrissian, they successfully arrive on Coruscant to begin their mission.

At Coruscant, treacherous New Republic Senator Viqi Shesh is scheduled to be executed, since her usefulness in helping the Vong in their invasion is gone. However, Shesh makes up a lie that allows her to live when she says that the shapers that grafted Tsavong Lah's artificial arm had intentionally set it to rot; the purpose of this is to force him to secretly do their bidding, or he would become a Shamed One. Lah looks into this with the help of Master Shaper Nen Yim, and finds strong evidence that there is indeed such a conspiracy forming against him.

Meanwhile, Viqi Shesh herself is controlling an innocent holocam operator named Tam Elgrin, working as a civilian assistant on Borleias, via a Yuuzhan Vong implant. At the end of the novel, Tam is able to overcome his conditioning, even when it nearly costs him his life, just before the New Republic launch into another engagement against the Vong. This engagement incorporates a tactic from the once-great Galactic Empire that forces the Vong to go into a temporary tactical retreat.

=== Enemy Lines II: Rebel Stand ===
Enemy Lines: Rebel Stand (also released as Enemy Lines II: Rebel Stand) is the second novel in a two-part story by Aaron Allston, published in June 2002. It reached #13 on the New York Times bestseller list on June 16, 2002.

Wedge Antilles continues to defend the planet Borleias from the Yuuzhan Vong. After rooting out a spy in the Vong-controlled Tam Elgrin, he begins creating a superlaser, identical to the Death Star's except in one regard: it doesn't work. Using both the laser and Commander Czulkang Lah's obsession with the capture of Jaina Solo, Antilles draws the Yuuzhan Vong fleet away from Lah's flagship. While the fleet is elsewhere, the Super Star Destroyer Lusankya is fitted with a spear and flown directly into the worldship. The worldship is destroyed, and Czulkang Lah perishes.

Meanwhile, on Coruscant, Luke Skywalker, Mara Jade Skywalker, Tahiri Veila and Wraith Squadron continue their scouting mission. There, they encounter a Dark Jedi similar to the mythical Lord Nyax, but who is really the genetically modified Dark Jedi Irek Ismaren. Nyax is more powerful than Luke, but, with the combined efforts of the Jedi and the Yuuzhan Vong, Nyax is defeated. Meanwhile, Viqi Shesh's plans to escape Coruscant are foiled by Wraith Squadron, and she commits suicide as a result.

Han and Leia Organa Solo, along with their droids C-3PO and R2-D2, set off on adventures to root out and overthrow any planetary government that plans to acquiesce to the Yuuzhan Vong. One of their most dangerous missions is set on Aphran IV, though they are able to escape death with their mission a success.

=== Traitor ===
Traitor is a 2002 novel by Matthew Stover. It does not feature any characters from the Star Wars films.

At the beginning of the novel, Jacen Solo is being tortured via the Embrace of Pain as he is overlooked by his captors, the Yuuzhan Vong and the mysterious figure known as Vergere. Vergere increases this pain by somehow robbing Jacen of the Force, but at the same time, she helps him through his agony by telling him to embrace, just like the Yuuzhan Vong do. Jacen does just as Vergere suggested, which pleases the Vong, represented by Nom Anor throughout the novel, who believe that in no time, Jacen will become just like them.

Soon, nearly a year following the Fall of Coruscant, Jacen is transported to a Yuuzhan Vong seedship, where he is enslaved to a creature called a dhuryam. As this happens, he gains Vongsense, similar to how his late brother, Anakin, had sensed them with his lambent-imbedded lightsaber back in Edge of Victory: Conquest.

The dhuryam is competing against other dhuryams to become the World Brain of the captured Coruscant, which has been renamed Yuuzhan'tar in honor of the Yuuzhan Vong's dead homeworld. As World Brain, the dhuryam that Jacen is enslaved to will have the responsibility and authority of everything technical on Yuuzhan'tar. Through more help from Vergere, who turns out to be a Force-user herself, Jacen forces the dhuryam to stop enslaving him and think of him as a partner; this way, the dhuryam would be more successful to be in consideration of being the World Brain of Yuuzhan'tar. As a result of this, Jacen's dhuryam indeed becomes more successful throughout various operations aboard the seedship.

Eventually, the day comes when a dhuryam aboard the seedship will become selected to govern Yuuzhan'tar. Jacen uses this day to start a riot where Yuuzhan Vong and slave alike are killed, and he takes advantage of the chaos to kill off his dhuryam's opponents. When he decides to kill his own dhuryam, he sees the spirit of Anakin telling him to stop. Not knowing whether or not this was the real Anakin or a fabrication created by Vergere, Jacen's hesitation in killing the surviving dhuryam results in him getting knocked out.

Jacen's dhuryam becomes the World Brain of Yuuzhan'tar by default, and Jacen wakes up on the captured Coruscant, realizing in horror what this newly transformed planet once was. Vergere leads him on a journey throughout the transformed world, and gradually, she shows him evidence that the Jedi's ideals of the Force are flawed; there is no light or dark side, but an overall power of the Force whose raw power is only considered to be of the dark side. Jacen refuses to believe this until Vergere leads him into a Yuuzhan Vong trap where he nearly kills all of them, including Vergere herself. Jacen is shocked at just how right Vergere is, even after she revealed previously that she was once a member of the previous Jedi Order. But eventually, Jacen comes to accept the Yuuzhan Vong's ways as they give him the late Anakin Solo's lightsaber, which is considered a holy relic to the Vong due to its imbedded lambent crystal.

Jedi Knight Ganner Rhysode has spent much time searching the galaxy trying to find Jacen, being one of the few who believe that he is still alive. He comes into contact with Jacen and an entourage of Yuuzhan Vong infiltrators aboard a New Republic refugee ship, and Ganner is captured due to his Jedi nature. He is taken to Yuuzhan'tar in order to be converted to their ways like Jacen. But as it turns out, Jacen had feigned loyalty to the Vong so that he could get close to the World Brain. The plan works as both he and Ganner are allowed admittance into the Well of the World Brain, although Nom Anor knows that they were faking their obedience to the Yuuzhan Vong. Knowing that Jacen won't have time to do whatever he wants to the World Brain, Ganner takes Jacen's lightsaber and decides to take on every Yuuzhan Vong warrior at the Well of the World Brain, vowing that not one of them will ever pass. Ganner fights every Vong warrior to the death, but in the end, he is so mortally wounded that he brings down the hall of the Well of the World Brain on top of himself and every surviving Vong with him. Meanwhile, as the battle commenced, Nom Anor looked to Vergere to escape the disaster, and Vergere tricks him into revealing his escape craft. Vergere then coerces the Vong plant life around them to tie up Nom Anor so that she and Jacen could escape Yuuzhan'tar. Meanwhile, Jacen concludes his business with the World Brain, and he and Vergere leave.

As they travel back to the New Republic, Jacen reveals to Vergere that he convinced the World Brain to teach the Yuuzhan Vong the concept of compromise; the brain will cause problems throughout the Vong's occupation of the world so that for once, the invaders will know that not everything will ever be perfect for them. Vergere applauds Jacen for applying what she taught him throughout the novel to the World Brain.

=== Destiny's Way ===
Destiny's Way was written by Walter Jon Williams and published in 2002 by Del Rey.

Jacen Solo has escaped from the Yuuzhan Vong with the aid of a Jedi Master from the time of the Old Republic, Vergere. Besides making cryptic references to Jacen's destiny, Vergere also reveals that she has spent the last fifty years with the Yuuzhan Vong in order to save the living world of Zonama Sekot, as well as to gather intelligence on the Vong themselves.

Meanwhile, Han and Leia Organa Solo were visiting the Imperial Remnant, trying to coax it into allying with the New Republic. Though the Remnant's leader, Grand Admiral Gilad Pellaeon, refuses the offer, he does give them the locations of the Galactic Empire's old hideaways in the deep core in order to help the Republic's war against the Yuuzhan Vong. In exchange, the Solos offer information on Yuuzhan Vong technology, especially the yammosks.

A new government is forming on Mon Calamari after the fall of Coruscant. Luke Skywalker wants to prevent an anti-Jedi government from forming, so his friends in the Smugglers' Alliance blackmail the majority of New Republic Senators into voting for Jedi-supporting Senator Cal Omas rather than the anti-Jedi Fyor Rodan. Luke inducts nine Jedi Knights into the new Jedi order he is forming, among them Jacen, his sister Jaina Solo, and the new Hapan Queen Mother Tenel Ka. The New Republic forces, now assembled on the water world of Mon Calamari, plan their next attack on the Yuuzhan Vong with the aid of the now-retired Admiral Ackbar.

However, some elements in the New Republic are desperate enough—the Bothans especially—to make the war against the Yuuzhan Vong one of extermination as well as victory. One method meant to accomplish such a task is through Alpha Red, a biological virus developed by New Republic agent Dif Scaur and Chiss scientists that had been successfully tested to eliminate anyone and anything with Yuuzhan Vong DNA. When word of Alpha Red got out, Vergere was able to infiltrate security and use the chemical compounds she manufactured through the Force, residing in her system, to transform Alpha Red into something harmless. Until Alpha Red can be concocted into something lethal against the Yuuzhan Vong again, it is ruled out as an option to use against the galactic invaders.

The success of the operation against Ebaq 9, a long-neglected world on a former Imperial trade route, leads the Yuuzhan Vong into a trap that halts their advance by killing nearly every warrior who went to Ebaq, including Warmaster Tsavong Lah, who died in combat against Jaina Solo. Vergere sacrifices herself to save Jacen from the Vong by plowing a stolen A-wing into Ebaq 9's surface. In the aftermath of the Battle of Ebaq 9, the New Republic is reformed into the Galactic Federation of Free Alliances, or the Galactic Alliance for short.

The Yuuzhan Vong agent provocateur Nom Anor, who suggested the assault on Ebaq 9, is obliged to give his life for his plan's failure, but he disguises himself and hides beneath Yuuzhan'tar's (formerly Coruscant's) streets.

=== Force Heretic I: Remnant ===
Force Heretic: Remnant (also released as Force Heretic I: Remnant) is the first novel in a three-part story by Sean Williams and Shane Dix, published in 2003.

Luke Skywalker leads a Jedi mission to find the lost, living world of Zonama Sekot, and on his way helps repel a Yuuzhan Vong invasion of the Imperial Remnant, formerly the Empire. Peace is declared between the Remnant and the reorganizing Galactic Alliance, but this is marred by the ruin of Barab I and the destruction of N'zoth by the Yuuzhan Vong. Meanwhile, the Solos (minus Jacen, since he is with Luke trying to find Zonama Sekot) and their allies discover an alliance between the Vong and the Fians, the inhabitants of Galantos, which is thwarted after the Vong try to invade the planet. Elsewhere, on Yuuzhan'tar, Nom Anor takes on the identity of Yu'shaa, prophet of the heretical Jeedai cult.

=== Force Heretic II: Refugee ===
Force Heretic: Refugee (also released as Force Heretic II: Refugee) is the second novel in a three-part story by Sean Williams and Shane Dix, published in 2003.

Luke Skywalker's mission to find the living world of Zonama Sekot takes him and his team to the Chiss capital world of Csilla. There, they look into the planet's library for any information on the living planet, and amidst this, they foil a Chiss conspiracy against the Fel family. As a result of this, Luke and his team are given more time, and Jacen Solo manages to figure out that Zonama Sekot is probably hiding in the Unknown Regions disguised as a moon. The team finds evidence of this as they look into information on a solar system that inhabits the gas giant of Mobus.

Meanwhile, the Solos and their allies foil two conspiracies on the world of Bakura just in time to repel the second Ssi-ruu Imperium's invasion of the planet. However, as a consequence, Tahiri Veila falls victim to her Yuuzhan Vong personality, which had previously been implanted in her by the late Vong shaper Mezhan Kwaad, and which has taken on potency to Tahiri's psyche following her boyfriend Anakin's death. Tahiri falls into a coma as a result, and her normal half and her Yuuzhan Vong half fight over control of her body within Tahiri's mind.

Beneath Yuuzhan'tar, Nom Anor, posing as Yu'shaa, the Prophet of the Shamed Ones, manages to find a turncoat Yuuzhan Vong priestess by the name of Ngaaluh. Ngaaluh agrees to help Nom Anor and the Shamed Ones topple Supreme Overlord Shimrra from the polyp throne, as there are those within the Vong elite who doubt Shimrra's ability to lead the species to salvation.

=== Force Heretic III: Reunion ===
Force Heretic: Reunion (also released as Force Heretic III: Reunion) is the third novel in a three-part story by Sean Williams and Shane Dix, published in 2003.

Han Solo and Leia fight to keep a critical communications center out of Yuuzhan Vong hands as Tahiri masters her half-Jedi, half-Vong nature. Luke Skywalker and his team of Jedi Knights rediscover the living world of Zonama Sekot (first seen in Greg Bear's novel Rogue Planet) and plead for that world's interference in the ongoing war. It goes well; the world agrees to follow them. Meanwhile, Nom Anor's heresy among the Shamed Ones is hindered when his elite spy, Ngaaluh, is discovered by Supreme Overlord Shimrra, and she is forced to kill herself. However, before she did so, Ngaaluh revealed to Nom Anor rumors from Shimrra's court of a living world that, according to Yuuzhan Vong legends, will be the downfall of the species.

=== The Final Prophecy ===
The Final Prophecy was written by Greg Keyes and published in 2003.

The novel's subplot focuses on the Galactic Alliance's battle with the Yuuzhan Vong in the Bilbringi system. When the HoloNet is suddenly scrambled, General Wedge Antilles's forces are forced to fight tooth-and-nail against the Vong while Jaina Solo is forced to deal with a group of cowardly criminals aboard a space station that would have meant quite a deal against the galactic invaders. As a result of the Battle of Bilbringi, several Galactic Alliance officers are captured or killed, and the remnants of Antilles's forces retreat back to their home defenses.

The main plot of the novel deals with the decisions made by Nom Anor and Nen Yim. With his heresy among the Shamed Ones starting to wane, Nom Anor reveals that a living world will come to save them and defeat Supreme Overlord Shimrra. Meanwhile, Master Shaper Nen Yim studies a spacecraft taken by an executed Yuuzhan Vong commander from the living world of Zonama Sekot. Nen Yim soon finds evidence that the biology between the Sekotan ship is similar to the DNA of the Yuuzhan Vong and their creations. This is part of the evidence among Nom Anor and the Shamed Ones that the living world that Ngaaluh mentioned in the previous novel is a destined harbinger of doom to Shimrra's order, or, to Shimrra and the elite, could spell the extermination of the Yuuzhan Vong as a whole. As this happens, the presence of the Quorealists becomes more well known in Shimrra's order. As it is revealed, the Quorealists are the lingering supporters of Shimrra's predecessor on the polyp throne, Quoreal, who espoused against invading the galaxy, which was what prompted Shimrra and his own supporters to overthrow and kill Quoreal and his followers. Priest Harrar, a secret Quorealist, becomes intrigued with the new evidence that Nen Yim uncovered from the Sekotan ship.

Nom Anor decides to act upon what Nen Yim discovered by calling to the Galactic Alliance to send Jedi over to help him and Nen Yim escape Yuuzhan'tar and find Zonama Sekot. Tahiri Veila and Corran Horn respond to the call, and along with successfully collecting the disguised Nom Anor and Nen Yim, they also pick up the turncoat Harrar via the Sekotan ship. They use its navigation to travel to Zonama Sekot, where the ship lands and dies. The five travelers begin to study the planet alongside each other in order to get to know the others' ways.

As Nen Yim eventually discovers a shocking truth between Zonama Sekot and the Yuuzhan Vong, Nom Anor makes a decision to kill the living world by sabotaging its hyperdrive cores just as he calls for help from the Vong; he believes that by killing the world that Shimrra fears so much, he would be inducted back into the elite. Nom Anor then reveals his true identity to Nen Yim and mortally wounds her before going after the hyperdrive cores. As she fades away into death, Nen Yim is able to tell Tahiri what Nom Anor plans to do, and she, Corran, and Harrar go after him. However, Nom Anor is successful in sabotaging the hyperdrive cores and escapes as the planet appears to begin dying. After Harrar is knocked off a cliff from his brief encounter with Nom Anor, Tahiri and Corran are rescued by Luke Skywalker, his wife Mara, Jacen Solo, and Saba Sebatyne, and they are all taken to shelter before Zonama Sekot jumps into hyperspace. Soon, Sekot, taking on the form of Nen Yim, reveals to the Jedi that Nom Anor's attempt to kill the living world has failed, and now, it is returning to known space to fight the Yuuzhan Vong.

=== The Unifying Force ===
The Unifying Force was written by James Luceno and published in November 2003. Hardcover editions of the book included a CD with the first book of the series, Vector Prime, a round-robin interview with some of the people involved with the series, and the Yuuzhan Vong "bible"—a collection of source material on the Yuuzhan Vong created and used by the authors. The round-robin interview was printed in some versions of the paperback release.

The novel begins on the Yuuzhan Vong prisoner-of-war camp planet of Selvaris. Four prisoners, a Jenet named Thorsh and three Bith, memorize a complex mathematical code smuggled in by a member of the Ryn Syndicate, and they make their escape. Two of the Bith are killed by the pursuing Yuuzhan Vong forces while one of them is captured, but Thorsh escapes Selvaris thanks to the Millennium Falcon. The surviving Bith is interrogated by the camp's head, Malik Carr, and the Bith reveals the mathematical code, unknowing of what it actually means. The Bith is killed as a result.

The Millennium Falcon brings Thorsh back to the Galactic Alliance where he is debriefed and recites the mathematical code to a Givin member of the Alliance. The code reveals that Selvaris will be the last pickup point for a Yuuzhan Vong-Peace Brigade convoy that will be taken to Yuuzhan'tar (Vongformed Coruscant) for a grand sacrifice. So an Alliance fleet ambushes Selvaris and rescues many prisoners, although some manage to get away. However, the Millennium Falcon, badly damaged from the battle, is forced to make an erratic jump into hyperspace that transports it to Caluula. As it turns out, the inhabitants of the Caluula system have been fending off the Vong for quite some time now, but they are able to repair the Falcon. Some of the prisoners leave the Falcon's company in order to help the residents of Caluula continue to fight the Yuuzhan Vong while the Falcon returns to the Alliance with what prisoners they have left.

As Zonama Sekot travels through hyperspace back to known space (it was previously in the Unknown Regions), it turns out that Harrar survived his confrontation with the treacherous Nom Anor in the previous novel. And through him, he and the residents of the living world discover that the Yuuzhan Vong exist outside the Force because they had been stripped of it, most likely by their homeworld of the original Yuuzhan'tar (which was destroyed in the Cremlevian War) back in the Vong's home galaxy.

On Yuuzhan'tar, things are not going well for Shimrra's order. Even with all of the advancements they made in the war against the Galactic Alliance, problems continue to plague the Yuuzhan Vong's capital planet thanks to the World Brain, and the heresy espoused by the Shamed Ones is still as strong as ever, even without Nom Anor's leadership. Nom Anor himself has been inducted back into the elite as Prefect of Yuuzhan'tar thanks to his actions on Zonama Sekot, but even he can't quell the fire that he sparked in the Shamed Ones as Yu'shaa, their Prophet. As for the sacrifice that had been partially foiled thanks to the Battle of Selvaris, the Yuuzhan Vong are able to compensate with captives from other contested worlds following Selvaris. But the sacrifice is spoiled thanks to a riot caused by the Shamed Ones, who save many of the Galactic Alliance captives much to their own detriment as Shimrra has many Shamed Ones and workers executed as capital punishment. Nevertheless, despite the thwarting of the sacrifice, Shimrra gives Warmaster Nas Choka the go-ahead to prepare his fleet to invade the Galactic Alliance's capital of Mon Calamari.

As the Yuuzhan Vong arrive at Mon Calamari and battle the opposing Galactic Alliance forces, Han and Leia Organa Solo, along with a few allies, infiltrate the Vong-captured Caluula in order to eliminate the resident yammosk there. Though they are captured with two of their allies killed, they find that the local Yuuzhan Vong and their biots are dying, along with many of Caluula's indigenous creatures. After many of the Yuuzhan Vong, their biots, and Caluula's own creatures die off, one craft made for Shimrra's new special Slayer warriors manages to make it off Caluula and it heads back to Yuuzhan'tar in order to inform the elite of this new affliction. As Kyp Durron, part of the infiltration team, is able to discern, the illness that the Yuuzhan Vong on Caluula are suffering is Alpha Red, a biological virus set to target and eliminate the Yuuzhan Vong and anything sharing their DNA with them. It had been deployed on Caluula in secret just before the planet surrendered to the invaders.

Just before it seems that Nas Choka's forces would win at the Battle of Mon Calamari, they suddenly make a hasty retreat back to Yuuzhan'tar, where Zonama Sekot has appeared in the capital planet's skies, causing various disasters and eliciting more opposition from the heretics. With the living world offering a distraction to the Yuuzhan Vong, the Jedi and the Galactic Alliance gather up all of their forces and resources for one last showdown against the Vong. After the Alliance successfully captures the Vong-occupied world of Corulag as their staging position, they travel to the captured Coruscant, and the Battle of Yuuzhan'tar, the final battle of the Yuuzhan Vong War, begins.

On the ground, Nom Anor decides to forsake Shimrra's order, seeing how deranged he has become as a result of Zonama Sekot's arrival, and realigns himself with the Shamed Ones against those who are still loyal to Shimrra. The heretics are soon reinforced by Galactic Alliance soldiers who managed to get past the Yuuzhan Vong's space defenses as the space fleets of both the Alliance and the Vong duel over the contested planetary capital of the galaxy and the world of Muscave. Meanwhile, Nas Choka takes a portion of his fleet to destroy Zonama Sekot using the Alpha Red-infected Slayer ship, as Shimrra revealed previously that there is indeed a biological connection between the Vong and Zonama. Defending the living world are the majority of the New Jedi Order, the Smugglers' Alliance, and the fleet of the Hapes Consortium. On Yuuzhan'tar, Luke Skywalker, his wife Mara, Jaina and Jacen Solo, Tahiri Veila, and Kenth Hamner all join up with Captain Judder Page's commandos in order to storm Shimrra's Citadel and kill the Supreme Overlord, ending the Yuuzhan Vong War once and for all. However, Mara, Tahiri, and Hamner all join a division of Page's commandos to help the heretics against Shimrra's loyal warriors, and it gives Mara an opportunity to confront Nom Anor, despite the fact that he is leading the heretics, for all he did to her, her family, and her friends and allies in the past. After Mara gives him a severe beating, Nom Anor pleads for his life, which Mara grudgingly spares so that he would be properly convicted for his crimes in the end.

Meanwhile, the Millennium Falcon goes on a mission with Harrar to convince the World Brain to cease its destruction of Yuuzhan'tar, which was intended by Shimrra to completely destroy the world so no one could have it, just to spite the Galactic Alliance. With the help of Nom Anor and his Shamed Ones and other allies, including turncoat Vong warriors, the crew of the Falcon, and Harrar, avert death from the Yuuzhan Vong sent to protect the World Brain. Then the Falcon's crew and Harrar make it to the dhuryam and they try to coerce Master Shaper Qelah Kwaad into convincing the brain to cease its destructive activities before they consider killing it. In the end, though, Jacen telepathically tells the World Brain to ignore Shimrra's commands, which stops Yuuzhan'tar's apocalypse.

As Page and his remaining commandos storm the lower levels of Shimrra's Citadel, Luke, Jaina, and Jacen, after killing and wounding every Yuuzhan Vong warrior in their path, eventually confront Shimrra and his fifteen special Slayer guards inside Shimrra's private coffer at the top of the Citadel. The three Jedi are able to kill all of the Slayers whilst Jaina follows Shimrra's Shamed companion, Onimi, to the control level of Shimrra's coffer. There, Onimi easily overpowers Jaina and renders her unconscious with a toxin from his fang. Jaina notes, as she falls unconscious, that she was able to sense Onimi through the Force. Meanwhile, with all of his Slayers dead, Shimrra fights Luke and traps him with his royal amphistaff, the Scepter of Power, before taking out the late Anakin Solo's lightsaber as a mind game to Luke; Shimrra wants Luke to know what it feels like to fight something that is part of his order, just as the Yuuzhan Vong have to fight Zonama Sekot, something that Shimrra believes should have been part of the Vong's order due to its living nature. Though Luke is poisoned by the Scepter of Power, he is able to take Anakin's lightsaber from Shimrra's grasp and he uses both his own and his late nephew's weapons to decapitate Shimrra. With Jacen's own lightsaber lost in the conflict, Luke throws him Anakin's lightsaber, which Jacen misses, and sees it fly away, echoing the vision he had on Duro three years earlier, and again on Zonama Sekot before the Battle of Yuuzhan'tar began. Regardless, Jacen goes up to the control level of Shimrra's coffer in order to collect Jaina.

As Onimi readies Shimrra's coffer to launch into space, an awakened but still weakened Jaina is told by the Shamed One, who believes that she is the human avatar of the Vong Trickster goddess Yun-Harla, that he had attained his Force powers by grafting yammosk DNA to his own neural tissue in order to emulate the gods' works in creating the universe. This was done after Onimi, being a Shaper at the time, discovered that there was no eighth cortex in the Shaper Qahsa. Although he was Shamed as a result, he was able to use his powers to not only concoct deadly toxins that he could control in his body, but he also manipulated Shimrra into convincing the rest of the Yuuzhan Vong into invading the galaxy; therefore, throughout Shimrra's reign, it was Onimi who had really been controlling the Yuuzhan Vong as its true Supreme Overlord. With Shimrra now dead, he plans to kill everyone and every living thing in the galaxy so that he could become a new god and fashion a new universe in his image.

As the Alliance and their Yuuzhan Vong allies take hold of Shimrra's Citadel, Luke is carried away, and Han and Leia follow Nom Anor's lead in order to find Jaina and Jacen at the control level of the Supreme Overlord's coffer. As they do that, the coffer launches for space, and the Millennium Falcon, piloted by Mara Jade Skywalker with an ailing Luke aboard, and Jagged Fel in his commandeered X-wing follow the coffer. Meanwhile, as word of Shimrra's death spreads, Nas Choka and his forces refuse to believe it, especially after his coffer appears rising up from Yuuzhan'tar. In the coffer, however, Jacen confronts Onimi and then hears the voice of his late grandfather, Anakin Skywalker, telling him to "stand firm," like he did on Duro. So as Jacen fights Onimi, he manages to achieve oneness with the Force, knowing that he'll never achieve this state again while simultaneously knowing that he'll spend the rest of his life trying to do so. As a result, Jacen defeats Supreme Overlord Onimi.

Han, Leia, and Nom Anor arrive just in time to watch Jacen's amazing victory as he appears to age five years. Onimi, meanwhile, is reverted of his Shamed deformities, but because his deformities were the result of his gaining the Force, he loses control of the toxins in his body and dies, melting into a puddle of foul hydrocarbons that is absorbed by the coffer's yorik coral floor like a stain.

The coffer begins to die off due its now-lost connection with Onimi, and Nom Anor tries to trick the Solos into going into a garbage chute while he escapes alive. With his Vongsense, Jacen thwarts his plan, and when Nom Anor tries one more time to evade the Solos, his hand is cut off by Leia via her lightsaber. Nevertheless, Nom Anor opens up the entry into the coffer's yorik-trema (landing craft) and simply allows the Solos to leave without him; due to his atheism, which makes him undesirable in the Yuuzhan Vong's society, and his contempt for the Force, which makes him undesirable in the Galactic Alliance's society, Nom Anor elects to die aboard the coffer, despite his earlier vows of surviving the war.

The coffer's explosion is viewed by Warmaster Nas Choka and his fleet. He announces to all of his forces that the war is over and that the Yuuzhan Vong's enemies have won. He offers them an ultimatum; those who wish to die may kill themselves or fight to the bitter end, while those like him will live to find out what the Galactic Alliance and their allies intend to do to them. Meanwhile, Zonama Sekot manages to repel the Alpha Red-infected Vong ship from its surface and brings down all ships, Yuuzhan Vong and non-Vong alike, to the ground. The Vong's weapons become docile and harmless as the invaders are welcomed home.

Aboard the Millennium Falcon, the Solos are saved from the dying yorik-trema, and Jacen is able to use Mara's tears and his own to concoct a chemical, as the late Vergere has done, to cure Luke of Shimrra's amphistaff poison. It works, and the Skywalkers and Solos collapse into one big embrace, glad that they survived and that the war is over. C-3PO and R2-D2 watch this scene and lament how at times like these, they envy how humans must feel.

Following the Yuuzhan Vong War's end, with most of the Peace Brigade dead and/or disbanded, Nas Choka meets with the Galactic Alliance's leaders to come to terms with how they should find a long-lasting solution to the war. Choka agrees to collect all remaining Vong throughout the galaxy so that they will be deposited on Zonama Sekot and be taken away into the Unknown Regions, where they will be safe and learn to acclimate their culture to peace and also reclaim their connection to the Force. To counter those who wish to see the Yuuzhan Vong totally exterminated, such as the Bothans among others, Galactic Alliance Chief of State Cal Omas saw to it that each and every remaining sample of Alpha Red has been destroyed. Meanwhile, Zonama Sekot discovers that it is the offspring of the original Yuuzhan'tar, thus explaining the biological connection that it has with the Yuuzhan Vong.

Amidst all of this, Luke declares that the Jedi shouldn't be the police force of the galaxy like it once was, and that the Order should allow individuals to find their own way in serving the galaxy, and, more importantly, themselves and the Force. Jacen, for one, plans to go on a galactic sojourn so that he could broaden his view of the Force following his battle with Onimi.

Several weeks later, after nearly every remaining Yuuzhan Vong is collected, Zonama Sekot travels back into the Unknown Regions. Later, the Skywalkers, the Solos, and their friends and allies revisit Kashyyyk, where Han pinions Anakin's lightsaber into Chewbacca's makeshift grave. Luke declares that should the need ever arise again, someone as virtuous as Chewbacca will pick up Anakin's lightsaber and conquer whatever threat that will endanger the galaxy in the future. Afterwards, they all have a feast where they discuss their vacation plans. Han convinces Lumpawaroo and Lowbacca not to carry on Chewbacca's life debt by saying that he and Leia already convinced their Noghri bodyguards, Cakhmaim and Meewalh, to take a vacation for themselves. The novel, and the series, ends with everybody laughing, not only at what Han said, but also in joy and relief that once again, the galaxy is at peace.
