= Rogue Planet (novel) =

2000 novel by Greg Bear

- Author: Greg Bear
- Cover artist: David Stevenson
- Language: English
- Series: Canon C
- Genre: Science fiction
- Publisher: Del Rey Books
- Publication date: May 2, 2000
- Publication place: United States
- Media type: Print (Hardcover & Paperback)
- Pages: 352 (first edition, hardback); 336 (mass market paperback)
- ISBN: 0-345-43538-9 (first edition, hardback)
- Preceded by: The Phantom Menace
- Followed by: Path to Truth

Rogue Planet is a science fiction novel by American writer Greg Bear, published in 2000 and set in the Star Wars universe. It is a prequel novel occurring after the events of Star Wars: Episode I – The Phantom Menace. The cover art was by David Stevenson. The book takes place 29 years before Star Wars Episode IV: A New Hope.

== Synopsis ==
The story takes place a few years after the events of Star Wars: Episode I – The Phantom Menace. Young Anakin Skywalker chafes under his new life as a Jedi apprentice. He sneaks away from Obi-Wan Kenobi to participate in and gamble on deadly flying games. This is interrupted by a Blood Carver assassin who tries to kill Anakin but is stopped by Obi-Wan.

The Jedi Council decides Anakin would be best served to send him with Obi-Wan to investigate the remote world of Zonama Sekot, a world that produces organic spacecraft. A Jedi has gone missing on Sekot.

A battle squadron pursues the two Jedi; it is headed by a weapons designer that has already blueprinted the Death Star. Commander Tarkin, the future Grand Moff Tarkin becomes involved as well. They also bring the Blood Carver assassin with them.

While the fleet approaches the planet and then tries to invade it, the Jedi grow their own ship. This leads to a confrontation between the two forces which ends with the sentient planet of Zonama Sekot using massive hyperspace engines to flee from Tarkin's fleets and the Jedi narrowly escaping this fleet.

== Links to other Expanded Universe material ==
The introduction of Zonama Sekot and the mysterious Jedi Vergere provided some of the first major links between the pre-Episode IV and post-Episode IV Star Wars expanded universe materials; both figure prominently in The New Jedi Order series. This may be because Zonama Sekot the rogue planet was really a seed of the original Yuuzhan'Tar, the destroyed homeworld of the Yuuzhan Vong. Actually the Yuuzhan Vong were in the galaxy since the days of the Galactic Republic, but did not interfere until the New Jedi Order Era.
