= Legacy of the Force =

2006–2008 Star Wars science fiction novels

Cover of the first book

The logo for the Legacy Era

The Legacy of the Force is a series of nine science fiction novels, published from 2006 to 2008, set in the Star Wars expanded universe. The series takes place approximately 40 years after the events of the film Star Wars Episode IV: A New Hope. The series picks up around 11 years after the events of the New Jedi Order saga. Published by American imprint Del Rey Books, the series was written by Troy Denning, Aaron Allston and Karen Traviss in an alternating cycle.

The series contains a mix of hardcover and paperback releases. The plan was to allow each author to write one hardcover novel and two paperbacks, with the first, middle (fifth), and final (ninth) novels being the hardcover releases, and the other novels being in paperback. An abridged audio book version of each story was released concurrently with each book, narrated by Marc Thompson.

== Background ==
Originally, the nine-book series was to be set in the Old Republic era, as confirmed by Sue Rostoni when the story was first presented as a concept. A month later, Rostoni stated that they were now moving the story arc to 35 years after the story of the original Star Wars film.

== Plot ==
=== Betrayal ===
Betrayal was written by Aaron Allston, and was released as a hardcover novel on May 30, 2006. It reached #10 on The New York Times Best Seller list on June 18, 2006.

Jacen starts training his young cousin Ben in the ways of the Force. After a successful mission to Adumar that ends in a life-threatening attack, they return for a dinner party at his parents' new home. There, Han voices his concern over Corellia trying to gain independence. Luke orders Jacen and Ben to disable the Centerpoint Station, an ancient artifact that Corellian leader (and Han's cousin) Thrackan Sal-Solo is trying to use to his advantage. Ben disables the station while Jacen keeps Thrackan busy, ensuring the Galactic Alliance's partial victory as another fleet built in secret spoils the main attack.

While traveling to a subterranean base, Ben and Nelani, a Jedi Knight, are forced out of a mining car. Their guide, Brisha Syo creates a dark side phantom of Luke Skywalker, who attacks and very nearly kills Jacen. Eventually, Brisha stops the projections and takes Jacen to an office, where Darth Vectivus, the supposed Sith Lord they are hunting, lives. After fighting Force projections with Ben, Nelani catches up with them. Brisha is revealed to be Lumiya, the Dark Lady of the Sith. She reveals that Vergere is a Sith apprentice, and that Jacen has already received Sith training. Lumiya says that Jacen is going to become the next Sith Lord. Unsure of his next move, Jacen uses the Force to create visions of the future. In each vision in which Lumiya is arrested, the galaxy is consumed in an endless war that eventually places Jacen against Luke. In the vision, Jacen kills his uncle.

Horrified, Jacen spares Lumiya. Nelani then tries to arrest the Sith, but Jacen intervenes. Jacen realizes that Nelani will, if allowed to survive, possibly fulfill the dark vision he had seen. He then fights and kills her, asking her forgiveness before striking the fatal blow. He agrees to consider what Lumiya had said and leaves the asteroid with an unconscious Ben. Jacen then erases Ben's memories of Lumiya and tells him that both she and Nelani had been killed by dark side phantoms. They return to Coruscant; however, after Jacen departs, Lumiya says that she had won.

=== Bloodlines ===
Bloodlines was written by Karen Traviss, and was released on August 29, 2006.

Fully pledged to Lumiya, Jacen becomes head of the GFFA's newly formed secret police, the Galactic Alliance Guard. With Ben at his side, he begins rounding up Corellians for internment and deportation. During an interrogation of a suspected assassin (who turns out to be Ailyn Vel, Boba Fett's daughter), Jacen tries to use the Force to extract information from her and kills her accidentally in the process.

=== Tempest ===
Tempest was written by Troy Denning, and was released on November 28, 2006.

Jacen also takes command of Rogue Squadron while it participates in the blockade of Corellia. He shoots down a civilian freighter that was attempting to run the blockade, and had fired on him, then relieves his sister from duty because she had refused to do it. He also uses the Anakin Solo to fire upon the Millennium Falcon, while both his sister and his parents are on board. He believes his parents to have been involved in a failed attempt to assassinate Tenel Ka; the Solos had in fact been set up by Dur Gejjen, Prime Minister of Corellia.

=== Exile ===
Exile was written by Aaron Allston, and was released on February 27, 2007. It reached #8 on The New York Times Best Seller list on March 18, 2007.

Jacen attempts to further his plan for peace against the wishes of his own family.

=== Sacrifice ===
Sacrifice was written by Karen Traviss, and was released as a hardcover novel on May 29, 2007.

Lumiya says she is pleased by his progress, but instructs him that to truly become a Sith he would have to undergo the Trial of Sacrifice: to kill that which he loves most. Doing this, he believes, would allow him to use the powers of the Sith without becoming evil and would "immortalize his love" for his sacrifice. Jacen decides there is only one way to fulfill this last obstacle: he would have to kill Tenel Ka and their daughter Allana. Nevertheless, after Ben tells Mara that he overheard Jacen communicating with Lumiya, Mara tracks Jacen down in the Hapes Consortium. After a long and heated battle, Jacen kills Mara Jade; the sacrifice necessary to becoming a Sith Lord is not Jacen's love, but Ben's. Ben suspects Jacen almost immediately, upon meeting Jacen at his mother's body. Eventually, Jacen chooses the Sith name Darth Caedus.

=== Inferno ===
Inferno was written by Troy Denning, and was released on August 28, 2007. It reached #7 on The New York Times Best Seller list on September 16, 2007.

Jacen, now known as Darth Caedus, fights everyone he once loved to bring his plan for prosperity to the galaxy.

To test how far Ben will let him go before acting and to punish the Wookies as a whole for not turning over his parents Han and Leia Solo, he brings his fleet to the Wookie home system and begins firing into the trees, burning them to the ground. This causes huge fire storms, massacring countless thousands of men, women, and children Wookies.

Seeing this death and destruction Ben attempts to kill Jacen, and fails. Jacen captures him, and using things he found and took from the Yuuzhan Vong during their invasion, tortures young Ben Skywalker attempting to force him to the dark side. He is rescued by Luke Skywalker and Jacen is forced to retreat.

=== Fury ===
Fury was written by Allston, and was released on November 27, 2007. It reached #3 on The New York Times Best Seller list on December 16, 2007.

Darth Caedus is now the principal antagonist of the series, and the declared enemy of nearly every other major character: His parents and sister have disowned him, Luke is sworn to redeem him, and Ben is driven to seek justice for his mother. In the novel, Caedus kidnaps Allana so Tenel Ka and the Hapans will not decide to leave the government, but Han, Leia, Luke, Jaina, Ben, and their allies save Allana. After saving Allana, Leia tells Caedus to become a Jedi again, but he refuses. Han and Leia later find out Allana is Caedus and Tenel Ka's child. At the end, Jaina plans to have training from Boba Fett to help her face off against Caedus, despite her parents once being foes with Fett.

=== Revelation ===
Revelation was written by Traviss, and was released on February 26, 2008.

Caedus takes on a new apprentice, Tahiri Veila, to replace Ben and turns to the task of ending the war. He entices the Imperial Remnant to join him in an attack on the planet Fondor. Although Admiral Niathal wants to offer the planet the chance to surrender, Caedus is determined to make an example of Fondor by crippling the shipyards and its planetary government. After previously sharing military secrets, which leads to hundreds of deaths and compromises the battle plan at Fondor, Niathal arranges a cease-fire without consulting Caedus. Enraged at this treason, Caedus orders the fleet to ignore Niathal's orders and bombard the major cities. Niathal orders all ships loyal to her to attack the Anakin Solo. Two-thirds of the fleet side with Caedus, while the rest ally themselves with Niathal. When the Imperial Remnant refuses to assist Caedus, his new apprentice assassinates Imperial Head of State Gilad Pellaeon and turns control over to the Moffs who then come to aid Jacen. A mysterious fleet led by Admiral Daala, loyal to Pellaeon, appears, accompanied by one hundred Mandalorian mercenaries. and together, owing to Daala's experimental weapons, they send the Galactic Alliance Fleet into retreat.

Caedus then takes control of Coruscant and claims sole control of the Galactic Alliance.

=== Invincible ===
Invincible was written by Troy Denning, and was released as a hardcover on May 13, 2008. It reached #5 on The New York Times Best Seller list on June 1, 2008.

Jaina takes it upon herself to defeat her brother. Caedus's meditations are disrupted by Luke Skywalker, in an attempt to hide Jaina's attack. Jaina, accompanied by several Mandalorian commandos, confronts Caedus, who quickly dispatches the Mandalorians, while Jaina acts as a sniper. When she finally runs out of ammunition, she seizes a Mandalorian saber and severs Caedus' arm. Jaina withdraws, however, due to her own injuries. After escaping an attack led by Luke Skywalker on the bridge of the Anakin Solo, Caedus sees a vision of his daughter Allana on a white throne in a time of peace. This vision convinces Caedus that he has won—he would bring peace to the galaxy, and prevent his visions of war and suffering from coming true.

At the book's climax, Caedus and Jaina face off in a final lightsaber duel aboard Caedus' flagship, the Anakin Solo. In the midst of the duel, Caedus comes back to the light and attempts to persuade Jaina of his intentions to protect Tenel Ka and Allana. Jaina refuses to listen, however, and attacks him after he deactivates and holsters his lightsaber. She later slams the door shut in his face when he tries to leave the fight. After a grueling battle in which both are seriously injured, Jacen is defeated when Jaina severs his Achilles tendon and stabs him in the heart. As he dies, Jacen reaches out to both his former lover and his child through the Force, warning them to flee from an approaching bio-warfare attack designed by the Imperial Remnant to kill them. In this act of selflessness, Jaina sees the remnants of the good man her brother had once been. Following Caedus's death and the war's end, the Galactic Alliance emerges victorious over the Confederation and peace is restored to the galaxy, just as Jacen had foreseen through a vision in the Force.

== Related works ==
Follow-up novels in the Legends timeline to the Legacy of the Force series include the books Crosscurrent and Riptide, Millennium Falcon, and the nine-novel Fate of the Jedi series.

== Adaptations ==
A short fan film was released in 2015 depicting the final battle Jacen and Jaina Solo from the series. Actor Tye Nelson received a nomination for best actor at the fan film awards 2016 for his role in the fan film as Jacen Solo / Darth Caedus.
