= Fate of the Jedi =

Series of Star Wars novels by various authors

Cover of the first book

Fate of the Jedi is a series of nine science-fiction novels set in the Star Wars expanded universe (now known as Star Wars Legends). The series is written in three cycles by the authors Aaron Allston, Christie Golden, and Troy Denning.

== Overview ==
The series picks up two years after the end of the Legacy of the Force series, which Aaron Allston and Troy Denning also contributed to.

=== Outcast ===
Outcast was written by Aaron Allston and was released on March 24, 2009. It reached #3 on the New York Times Best Seller list on April 12, 2009.

=== Omen ===
Omen was written by Christie Golden and was released on June 23, 2009. It reached #4 on the New York Times Best Seller list on July 12, 2009.

=== Abyss ===
Abyss was written by Troy Denning and was released on August 18, 2009. It reached #7 on the New York Times Best Seller list on September 6, 2009.

=== Backlash ===
Backlash was written by Aaron Allston and was originally scheduled for release on January 26, 2010, but was moved back to March 9 to give the author time to recover from his 2009 heart attack. The book reached #4 on the New York Times Best Seller list on March 28, 2010.

=== Allies ===
Allies was written by Christie Golden and was released on May 25, 2010. It reached #8 on the New York Times Best Seller list on June 13, 2010.

=== Vortex ===
Vortex was written by Troy Denning and was released on November 30, 2010.

=== Conviction ===
Conviction was written by Allston and was published on May 24, 2011. It reached #3 on the New York Times Best Seller list on June 12, 2011.

=== Ascension ===
Ascension was written by Golden and was published on August 9, 2011. It reached #7 on the New York Times Best Seller list on August 28, 2011.

=== Apocalypse ===
Apocalypse was written by Denning and was published on April 3, 2012. It reached #2 on the New York Times Best Seller list on April 1, 2012.
