= List of Star Wars planets and moons =

Planets and moons in the Star Wars media franchise

Map of the Star Wars galaxy (Legends)

The Universe of the Star Wars franchise features multiple planets and moons. While only the feature films and some other works are considered canon to the franchise since the 2012 acquisition of Lucasfilm by The Walt Disney Company, some canon planets were first named or explored in works from the non-canon Star Wars expanded universe, now rebranded as Star Wars Legends.

== Canon planets and moons ==
The following list names prominent planets and moons from the Star Wars films or other canon media.

Name	First appearance	Year	Media	Fictional description	Ref(s).
Abafar	Star Wars: The Clone Wars	2012	TV series	A desert planet located in the Outer Rim with a completely white surface. Known as The Void, the planet is barely populated but is home to massive amounts of rhydonium, a scarce and volatile fuel.	
Agamar	Star Wars Legends: The Farlander Papers	1993	Novella	A barren, rocky planet in the Outer Rim. Site of a still-active reserve of Separatist droids that became known for surviving the Clone Wars. In Legends this was the homeworld of character Keyan Farlander.	
Agamar	Star Wars: The Clone Wars	2012	TV series (mentioned)	A barren, rocky planet in the Outer Rim. Site of a still-active reserve of Separatist droids that became known for surviving the Clone Wars. In Legends this was the homeworld of character Keyan Farlander.	
Agamar	Star Wars Rebels	2016	TV series	A barren, rocky planet in the Outer Rim. Site of a still-active reserve of Separatist droids that became known for surviving the Clone Wars. In Legends this was the homeworld of character Keyan Farlander.	
Ahch-To	The Force Awakens	2015	Film	Largely oceanic planet on which Luke Skywalker has been hiding for several years, and the location of the first Jedi Temple and the Tree Library of sacred Jedi texts. Porgs, Lanai and thala-sirens are among the native species.	
Ajan Kloss	Star Wars Battlefront II	2017	Video game	A jungle moon which serves as a new base of operations for the Resistance. Years before, Leia Organa and Luke were training there. Leia dies here after using the last of her energy to reach out to her son through the Force.	
Akiva	Star Wars: Aftermath	2015	Book	Jungle planet and home of Norra and Temmin Wexley, and a primary setting in Aftermath.	
Alaris Prime	Star Wars Legends: Star Wars: Galactic Battlegrounds	2001	Video game	A green moon orbiting the gas giant Alaris, in the Kashyyyk system. It was colonized by the Wookiees with the help of Jedi Master Qui-Gon Jinn some time between the years 36 BBY and 39 BBY, after twenty years of much debate in the Senate of the Galactic Republic over colonization rights.	
Alaris Prime	Star Wars Adventures	2019	Comics	A moon orbiting the planet Alaris, in the Kashyyyk system.	
Alderaan	A New Hope	1977	Film	A planet covered with forests and mountains; homeworld of Princess Leia and the House of Organa. Destroyed by the first Death Star as punishment for her involvement in the Rebel Alliance and also as a demonstration of power.	
Aldhani	Andor	2022	TV series	A temperate, alpine planet with highlands, valleys, forests, and lakes sacred to the indigenous Dhani people, until they were relocated by the Empire, having established a base situated within a dam housing a vault funding its military.	
Aleen	Star Wars: The Clone Wars	2011	TV series	A subterranean world located in the Mid Rim. The native species include the surface-dwelling beings called the Aleena and sentient tree-like beings called Kindalo.	
Alzoc III	Star Wars Legends: Jedi Knight II: Jedi Outcast	2003	Video game	Ice planet with many glaciers, and on its surface lies a crashed Separatist carrier, with an anti-gravitational device. In Legends it was the homeworld of the Talz race.	
Alzoc III	Star Wars: Last Shot	2018	Book (mentioned)	Ice planet with many glaciers, and on its surface lies a crashed Separatist carrier, with an anti-gravitational device. In Legends it was the homeworld of the Talz race.	
Anaxes	Star Wars Legends: Star Wars: Empire at War	2006	Video game	A rocky planet located in the Azure sector of the galaxy's Core Worlds region. A majority of its surface was covered with tall, red plant-like life. In the early years of the Imperial Era, the planet was destroyed in a cataclysm, with the remains becoming the Anaxes asteroid belt.	
Anaxes	Star Wars: The Clone Wars	2020	TV series	A rocky planet located in the Azure sector of the galaxy's Core Worlds region. A majority of its surface was covered with tall, red plant-like life. In the early years of the Imperial Era, the planet was destroyed in a cataclysm, with the remains becoming the Anaxes asteroid belt.	
Ando	Star Wars Legends: Dark Force Rising	1992	Book	A water-covered planet located in the Outer Rim, it is home to the amphibious Aqualish species and endures great turmoil during the Separatist Crisis.	
Ando	Star Wars Rebels: Head to Head	2014	Book	A water-covered planet located in the Outer Rim, it is home to the amphibious Aqualish species and endures great turmoil during the Separatist Crisis.	
Anoat	The Empire Strikes Back	1980	Film (mentioned)	Polluted; A nearly inhospitable planet used by the Empire.	
Anoat	Star Wars Legends: Star Wars: Dark Forces	1995	Video game	Polluted; A nearly inhospitable planet used by the Empire.	
Anoat	Star Wars: Uprising	2015	Video game	Polluted; A nearly inhospitable planet used by the Empire.	
Arvala-7	The Mandalorian	2019	TV series	Desert planet where the Mandalorian finds Grogu.	
At Achrann	Star Wars: Skeleton Crew	2024	TV series	A planet that was one of the nine Jewels of the Old Republic. During the New Republic it is war-torn, due to constant conflict between clans.	
At Acoda	Star Wars: Skeleton Crew	2024	TV series (mentioned)	A planet that was one of the nine Jewels of the Old Republic. Later it was destroyed.	
At Aravin	Star Wars: Skeleton Crew	2024	TV series (mentioned)	A planet that was one of the nine Jewels of the Old Republic.	
At Arissa	Star Wars: Skeleton Crew	2024	TV series (mentioned)	A planet that was one of the nine Jewels of the Old Republic.	
At Attin	Star Wars: Skeleton Crew	2024	TV series	A planet that was intentionally hidden and physically cut-off from the rest of the galaxy; it is considered a Jewel of the Old Republic. Most believe At Attin to be a myth, described as a lost planet containing eternal treasure. This is partially true, At Attin is a sparsely populated Synthetic Technocracy-governed planet with only one metropolis settlement and a singular economic output dubbed "the great work": security printing and money creation, a "piggy-bank" for the Star Wars Galaxy. Only the Republic Treasury Department representative, on a specially designated Republic spaceship, is permitted the location and entry to At Attin.	
At Aytuu	Star Wars: Skeleton Crew	2024	TV series (mentioned)	A planet that was one of the nine Jewels of the Old Republic.	
Atollon	Star Wars Rebels	2016	TV series	Desert planet, site of Phoenix Squadron Rebel base. Home of the spider-like hexapods known as the Krykna, and the powerful force-wielder Bendu. The Battle of Atollon was allowed by Grand Admiral Thrawn himself, and destroyed most of the base, forcing the Phoenix Squadron to leave.	
Barton IV	The Bad Batch	2023	TV series	An icy planet where the Galactic Empire maintained a supply depot. The clone trooper CT-9904 "Crosshair" was sent to the outpost on the planet.	
Balnab	Star Wars: The Clone Wars	2008	TV series	A barbaric world once visited by R2-D2 and C-3PO.	
Batuu	Thrawn: Alliances	2018	Book	A planet that features a remote frontier outpost and an old trading port. In 34 ABY, Kylo Ren travels to the planet to try to find Rey.	
Bespin	The Empire Strikes Back	1980	Film	A gas planet with a thin layer of habitable atmosphere where Cloud City was located. The planet's gas layers were a source of rare tibanna gas which was harvested and refined at mining complexes like Cloud City. Location of Han Solo's carbonization, and Luke Skywalker and Darth Vader's duel, with the latter cutting off Luke's hand and losing his lightsaber, and revealing himself to be Luke's father.	
Bogano	Star Wars Jedi: Fallen Order	2019	Video game	A largely uninhabited grassy planet in the Outer Rim, home to a Zeffo vault.	
Bora Vio	The Bad Batch: Season 1 Episode 9	2021	TV Series	Located in the Lido system, this planet has a cloudy atmosphere and hosted a Kaminoan facility that was abandoned by the time of the Galactic Empire.	
Bracca	Star Wars Jedi: Fallen Order	2019	Video game	An inhospitable junkyard planet in the Mid Rim considered strategically important in the Clone Wars. Becomes useful to the Scrapper Guild whose members salvage decommissioned ships for the Empire.	
Brendok	The Acolyte	2024	TV series	A planet in the Outer Rim that is home to Osha and Mae Aniseya, as well as a coven of force-sensitive witches known as the Witches of Brendok.	
Cantonica	The Last Jedi	2017	Film	An arid planet where the resort city of Canto Bight, home of the Canto Casino and Racetrack, is located.	
Castilon	Star Wars Resistance	2018	TV series	An ocean planet with no known landmasses located in the Outer Rim near Wild Space. Home to the aircraft refueling station Colossus, as well as a destination for racers.	
Cato Neimoidia	Star Wars Legends: Darth Maul: Saboteur	2001	Short story	Colony world of the Neimoidian species. The site of battles throughout the Clone Wars, notable for its "Bridge Cities". Also the site of Plo Koon's death during the Great Jedi Purge.	
Cato Neimoidia	Revenge of the Sith	2005	Film	Colony world of the Neimoidian species. The site of battles throughout the Clone Wars, notable for its "Bridge Cities". Also the site of Plo Koon's death during the Great Jedi Purge.	
Chandrila	Star Wars Legends: The Truce at Bakura	1994	Book	A prominent Core world known for producing scholars and diplomats, steeped in ancient traditions. Its serene geography features majestic mountain vistas and lush valleys. Represented by Mon Mothma in the galactic Senate. Appeared on-screen for the first time when it prominently featured in Andor Season 2. After the fall of the Empire it became the first temporary capital of the New Republic.	
Chandrila	Star Wars: Aftermath	2015	Book	A prominent Core world known for producing scholars and diplomats, steeped in ancient traditions. Its serene geography features majestic mountain vistas and lush valleys. Represented by Mon Mothma in the galactic Senate. Appeared on-screen for the first time when it prominently featured in Andor Season 2. After the fall of the Empire it became the first temporary capital of the New Republic.	
Chandrila	Andor	2022	TV series	A prominent Core world known for producing scholars and diplomats, steeped in ancient traditions. Its serene geography features majestic mountain vistas and lush valleys. Represented by Mon Mothma in the galactic Senate. Appeared on-screen for the first time when it prominently featured in Andor Season 2. After the fall of the Empire it became the first temporary capital of the New Republic.	
Christophsis	Star Wars: The Clone Wars	2008	TV series	During the Clone Wars, the Battle of Christophsis occurs here, serving as an introduction to Ahsoka Tano.	
Concord Dawn	Star Wars Legends: The Last One Standing: The Tale of Boba Fett	1996	Short story	Home planet of Jango Fett. Habitable planet that is surrounded by a large amount of debris from many vicious wars. Formerly controlled by the Mandalorians.	
Concord Dawn	Star Wars: The Clone Wars	2012	TV series (mentioned)	Home planet of Jango Fett. Habitable planet that is surrounded by a large amount of debris from many vicious wars. Formerly controlled by the Mandalorians.	
Concord Dawn	Star Wars Rebels	2016	TV series	Home planet of Jango Fett. Habitable planet that is surrounded by a large amount of debris from many vicious wars. Formerly controlled by the Mandalorians.	
Corellia	A New Hope	1977	Film (mentioned)	Industrial planet located in the Core of the galaxy, with a strong culture of training pilots. Homeworld of Han Solo and Qi'ra, plus Wedge Antilles, Crix Madine and Dengar, along with many more humans (most Legends-exclusives).	
Corellia	Star Wars Legends: The Corellian Trilogy	1995	Book	Industrial planet located in the Core of the galaxy, with a strong culture of training pilots. Homeworld of Han Solo and Qi'ra, plus Wedge Antilles, Crix Madine and Dengar, along with many more humans (most Legends-exclusives).	
Corellia	Solo: A Star Wars Story	2018	Film	Industrial planet located in the Core of the galaxy, with a strong culture of training pilots. Homeworld of Han Solo and Qi'ra, plus Wedge Antilles, Crix Madine and Dengar, along with many more humans (most Legends-exclusives).	
Coruscant	Star Wars Legends: Heir to the Empire	1991	Book	Cosmopolitan urban world consisting of one planet-wide city. Coruscant is situated in the heart of the Star Wars galaxy with a population of over one trillion, and is Governmental center of the Galactic Republic and later the Galactic Empire. Home to the main Jedi Temple, which would become the Imperial Palace.	
Coruscant	Return of the Jedi (Special Edition)	1997	Film	Cosmopolitan urban world consisting of one planet-wide city. Coruscant is situated in the heart of the Star Wars galaxy with a population of over one trillion, and is Governmental center of the Galactic Republic and later the Galactic Empire. Home to the main Jedi Temple, which would become the Imperial Palace.	
Coruscant	The Phantom Menace	1999	Film	Cosmopolitan urban world consisting of one planet-wide city. Coruscant is situated in the heart of the Star Wars galaxy with a population of over one trillion, and is Governmental center of the Galactic Republic and later the Galactic Empire. Home to the main Jedi Temple, which would become the Imperial Palace.	
Crait	Leia, Princess of Alderaan	2017	Book	Small mineral planet located in a remote section of the galaxy, its surface is covered with a layer of white salt over its red-colored soil. In Leia, Princess of Alderaan it is the location of an early Rebel Alliance outpost. Leia and her remaining Resistance forces flee there in The Last Jedi, where they face off with the First Order until the intervention of Luke.	
D'Qar	The Force Awakens	2015	Film	Site of a Partisan operations base led by Saw Gerrera, it was later abandoned after an Imperial spy was discovered in their ranks, and later occupied by the Rebel Alliance as a small outpost. Decades later, the base was occupied by the Resistance led by General Leia Organa, and was destroyed during the evacuation following the destruction of Starkiller Base.	
Dagobah	The Empire Strikes Back	1980	Film	Swamp planet and Yoda's residence after the fall of the Jedi and resting-place.	
Daiyu	Obi-Wan Kenobi	2022	TV series	A cityscape planet where Ben Kenobi begins his search for Leia Organa.	
Dantooine	A New Hope	1977	Film (mentioned)	Rural planet where the Rebel Alliance was formally organized and one of their first bases. The writers of Rogue One considered depicting the Rebels evacuating the base for Yavin 4, but "it didn't move the story forward and it would have cost a ton of money."	
Dantooine	Star Wars Legends: Jedi Search	1994	Book	Rural planet where the Rebel Alliance was formally organized and one of their first bases. The writers of Rogue One considered depicting the Rebels evacuating the base for Yavin 4, but "it didn't move the story forward and it would have cost a ton of money."	
Dantooine	Star Wars Rebels	2017	TV series	Rural planet where the Rebel Alliance was formally organized and one of their first bases. The writers of Rogue One considered depicting the Rebels evacuating the base for Yavin 4, but "it didn't move the story forward and it would have cost a ton of money."	
Dathomir	Star Wars Legends: The Courtship of Princess Leia	1994	Book	Sith world and homeworld of the Nightsisters, including the Force-sensitive Asajj Ventress. Also the homeworld of the Zabrak warriors, including Darth Maul. A remote world, perpetually bathed in blood-red sunlight and home to numerous dangerous predators.	
Dathomir	Star Wars: The Clone Wars	2011	TV series	Sith world and homeworld of the Nightsisters, including the Force-sensitive Asajj Ventress. Also the homeworld of the Zabrak warriors, including Darth Maul. A remote world, perpetually bathed in blood-red sunlight and home to numerous dangerous predators.	
Devaron	Star Wars Legends: Tales from the Mos Eisley Cantina	1995	Book	Forest planet with an ancient Jedi Temple. Home to the horned Devaronian species.	
Devaron	Star Wars: The Clone Wars	2009	TV series	Forest planet with an ancient Jedi Temple. Home to the horned Devaronian species.	
Dizon Fray	Andor	2022	TV series (mentioned)	Outer Rim moon home of the Dizonites, who were massacred for resisting Imperial efforts to build a refueling station. The genocide was broadcast as proof of their success, while their choral screams were developed into a torture method used by the Empire.	
Eadu	Rogue One	2016	Film	Rocky, mountainous planet beset by constant severe storms. Home to an Imperial weapons research facility. Its appearance was partly inspired by the fictitious planet LV-426 from the Alien franchise.	
Endor (planet)	Return of the Jedi	1983	Film	Blue gas giant with a complex planetary system, including moons like Endor and Kef Bir. This system was controlled by the Empire until the second Death Star was destroyed.	
Endor (moon)	Return of the Jedi	1983	Film	Forest moon that the second Death Star orbits, and home to an Imperial outpost. Inhabited by Ewoks. The location of the battle between the Rebel Alliance and the Empire leading to the destruction of the second Death Star.	
Er´kit	Star Wars Commander	2014	Video game	Desert planet located in the galaxy's Outer Rim Territories. Homeworld of the Er'Kit species.	
Eriadu	Star Wars Legends: Darth Maul: Saboteur	2001	Book	Planet located in the galaxy's Outer Rim. Homeworld of Grand Moff Tarkin and his family.	
Eriadu	Tarkin	2014	Book	Planet located in the galaxy's Outer Rim. Homeworld of Grand Moff Tarkin and his family.	
Esseles	Star Wars Legends: Episode I Adventures	1999	Book	Under Imperial Control. The Empire has a listening post concealed in Esseles' icy ring.	
Esseles	Star Wars Squadrons	2020	Video game	Under Imperial Control. The Empire has a listening post concealed in Esseles' icy ring.	
Exegol	The Rise of Skywalker	2019	Film	A stormy planet in the galaxy's "Unknown Regions", with its location deliberately obscured by Republic and Jedi efforts. An ancient bastion of the Sith, it serves as the lair of Darth Sidious and the Sith Eternal during the construction of a Sith armada known as the Final Order.	
Felucia	Revenge of the Sith	2005	Film	Jungle planet teeming with plants but little animal life. Aayla Secura is assassinated here during the Great Jedi Purge.	
Ferrix	Andor	2022	TV series	Desert planet with extensive scrapyard industry and known for its salvage markets.	
Florrum	Star Wars: The Clone Wars	2009	TV series	Sulfurous desert planet. Hondo Ohnaka is the leader of a pirate gang based on the planet.	
Fondor	Star Wars Legends: Darth Vader Strikes	1981	Comics	Imperial manufacturing center with large shipyards. Home planet of Luthen Rael.	
Fondor	Star Wars Battlefront II	2017	Video game	Imperial manufacturing center with large shipyards. Home planet of Luthen Rael.	
Geonosis	Attack of the Clones	2002	Film	Rocky desert planet where battle droids are manufactured, and the site of the opening battle of the Clone Wars. All life on the planet is presumed destroyed by the Empire in Star Wars Rebels, with two exceptions: Klik-Klak and his offspring. Primary construction site of the first Death Star. Homeworld of the Geonosians.	
Ghorman	Star Wars Legends: The Rebel Alliance Sourcebook	1990	Book	A planet where the Ghorman Massacre, when the Empire slaughtered a crowd of peaceful protesters, occurred. The Ghorman Massacre was an inciting incident for the formal organization of the Rebel Alliance. In Legends continuity the massacre was perpetrated by Grand Moff Tarkin. Home to large kalkite reserves and the Ghorman Front resistance group. The depiction of Ghorman in Andor was inspired by France.	
Ghorman	Andor	2025	TV series	A planet where the Ghorman Massacre, when the Empire slaughtered a crowd of peaceful protesters, occurred. The Ghorman Massacre was an inciting incident for the formal organization of the Rebel Alliance. In Legends continuity the massacre was perpetrated by Grand Moff Tarkin. Home to large kalkite reserves and the Ghorman Front resistance group. The depiction of Ghorman in Andor was inspired by France.	
Hosnian Prime	The Force Awakens	2015	Film	Urban planet and capital of the New Republic. Destroyed by the First Order's Starkiller Base.	
Hoth	The Empire Strikes Back	1980	Film	Desolate ice planet and base for the Rebel Alliance. Homeworld of the Wampas.	
Iego	The Phantom Menace	1999	Film (mentioned)	An Outer Rim planet that harbors flying creatures called Xandu and medicinally important plants called Reeska. Iego is surrounded by 1000 moons and at least one of these, named Millius Prime, is home to a race called the Angels.	
Iego	Star Wars: The Clone Wars	2009	TV series	An Outer Rim planet that harbors flying creatures called Xandu and medicinally important plants called Reeska. Iego is surrounded by 1000 moons and at least one of these, named Millius Prime, is home to a race called the Angels.	
Ilum	Star Wars Legends: Jedi Quest: Path to Truth	2001	Book	Remote ice planet where kyber crystals are mined. Converted into Starkiller Base by the First Order and destroyed in The Force Awakens.	
Ilum	Star Wars: The Clone Wars	2012	TV series	Remote ice planet where kyber crystals are mined. Converted into Starkiller Base by the First Order and destroyed in The Force Awakens.	
Iridonia	Star Wars Legends: Star Wars Episode I Journal: Darth Maul	2000	Book	Home of the Iridonian Zabrak people and formerly rumored birthplace of Darth Maul.	
Iridonia	Star Wars: The Clone Wars	2011	TV series (mentioned)	Home of the Iridonian Zabrak people and formerly rumored birthplace of Darth Maul.	
Jabiim	Star Wars Legends: Star Wars: Republic	2003	Comics	A desert planet site of the Path where Ben Kenobi helped people to escape from the Empire. In Legends it constantly rained on the planet.	
Jabiim	Obi-Wan Kenobi	2022	TV series	A desert planet site of the Path where Ben Kenobi helped people to escape from the Empire. In Legends it constantly rained on the planet.	
Jakku	The Force Awakens	2015	Film	Desert planet. Site of a "graveyard" of ships damaged during the Battle of Jakku, the final battle between the New Republic and the Galactic Empire. Also the homeworld of Rey.	
Jedha	Rogue One	2016	Film	Cold desert moon, and a sacred place for believers in the Force. A source of kyber crystals used for lightsabers and the Death Star's primary weapon. It is also the first location on which the Death Star's destructive capability is tested. Became a site of battle during the High Republic series. Rogue One's director, Gareth Edwards, has described the location as "a Mecca or Jerusalem within the Star Wars world". It is also a homophone of Jeddah, the principal gateway to Mecca.	
Jelucan	Star Wars: Lost Stars	2015	Book	A rocky, mountainous planet in the Outer Rim, and the homeworld of Thane Kyrell and Ciena Ree.	
Jestefad	Revenge of the Sith	2005	Film	A large gas planet that is part of the Mustafar system. Directly responsible for Mustafar's volcanic climate due to an intense gravitational tug-of-war with close by gas giant Lefrani.	
Kaller	Star Wars: The Bad Batch	2021	TV series	A snowy and rocky planet that served as one of the final battles of the Clone Wars. It is where Jedi Master Depa Billaba sacrificed herself during Order 66 to allow her padawan Caleb Dume to escape.	
Kamino	Attack of the Clones	2002	Film	Ocean planet located outside the main galaxy, where cloning technology is developed and the Clone Army is created and trained. Obi-Wan Kenobi discovers that the planet is missing from the Jedi archives; it is later revealed to have been deleted as a part of the Sith plot to start the Clone Wars, and take over the galaxy. The capital is Tipoca City.	
Kashyyyk	Star Wars Holiday Special	1978	TV film	Forest planet and home of the Wookiees. Also the site of one of the final battles of the Clone Wars.	
Kashyyyk	Revenge of the Sith	2005	Film	Forest planet and home of the Wookiees. Also the site of one of the final battles of the Clone Wars.	
Kef Bir	The Rise of Skywalker	2019	Film	A moon of Endor and the location of some of the wreckage of the second Death Star after it was destroyed in Return of the Jedi. Location of Rey and Kylo Ren's final duel, with the latter rejecting the dark side.	
Kenari	Andor	2022	TV series	A forested planet devastated by Republic and later Imperial mining operations. Originally the home planet of Cassian Andor.	
Kessel	Star Wars	1977	Film (mentioned)	A mining planet that has been fought over by crime lords for its valuable Spice. A fissure vent beneath the spice mines served as a source of astatic coaxium, an element that could be refined into hyperfuel for starships. In Legends it was also a prison-planet.	
Kessel	Star Wars Legends: Jedi Search	1994	Book	A mining planet that has been fought over by crime lords for its valuable Spice. A fissure vent beneath the spice mines served as a source of astatic coaxium, an element that could be refined into hyperfuel for starships. In Legends it was also a prison-planet.	
Kessel	Star Wars Rebels	2014	TV series	A mining planet that has been fought over by crime lords for its valuable Spice. A fissure vent beneath the spice mines served as a source of astatic coaxium, an element that could be refined into hyperfuel for starships. In Legends it was also a prison-planet.	
Kessel	Solo: A Star Wars Story	2018	Film	A mining planet that has been fought over by crime lords for its valuable Spice. A fissure vent beneath the spice mines served as a source of astatic coaxium, an element that could be refined into hyperfuel for starships. In Legends it was also a prison-planet.	
Khofar	The Acolyte	2024	TV series	A forest planet in the Outer Rim. Home to the Wookie Jedi Master Kelnacca.	
Kijimi	The Rise of Skywalker	2019	Film	A frigid mountainous planet. It was the homeworld of Zorii Bliss, leader of the smuggling gang known as the Spice Runners of Kijimi. It is later destroyed by the Xyston-class Star Destroyer Derriphan of the Sith Eternal's fleet, the Final Order, as a show of force for the rest of the galaxy.	
Koboh	Star Wars Jedi: Survivor	2023	Video game	A rugged planet known for its abundance of the mineral priorite. Location of Rambler's Reach outpost.	
Krownest	Star Wars Rebels	2017	TV Series	A planet in the Mandalorian sector that is the ancestral home of Clan Wren	
Kuat	Star Wars Legends: Wedge's Gamble	1996	Book	Industrial planet home to Kuat Drive Yards, the manufacturer of Star Destroyers.	
Kuat	Star Wars: The Clone Wars	2009	TV series (mentioned)	Industrial planet home to Kuat Drive Yards, the manufacturer of Star Destroyers.	
Lah'mu	Catalyst: A Rogue One Novel	2016	Book	A remote planet with black sands, where Jyn Erso and her parents go into hiding.	
Lira San	Star Wars Rebels	2016	TV series	Remote homeworld of the Lasat hidden behind a treacherous nebula.	
Lothal	Star Wars Rebels	2014	TV series	Remote farm planet and birthplace of Ezra Bridger.	
Lotho Minor	Star Wars: The Clone Wars	2011	TV series	A planetary junkyard and hiding place of Darth Maul after his presumed death.	
Malachor	Star Wars Legends: Star Wars Knights of the Old Republic II: The Sith Lords	2004	Video game	Desolate Sith world and site of two major battles thousands of year apart: one involving the Scourge of Malachor, the other between Maul, several Rebels, Darth Vader, and several Inquisitors. In Legends it was known as Malachor V and the site of the last battle of the Mandalorian Wars.	
Malachor	Star Wars Rebels	2016	TV series	Desolate Sith world and site of two major battles thousands of year apart: one involving the Scourge of Malachor, the other between Maul, several Rebels, Darth Vader, and several Inquisitors. In Legends it was known as Malachor V and the site of the last battle of the Mandalorian Wars.	
Malastare	The Phantom Menace	1999	Film (mentioned)	Forested planet where podracing is popular. Birthplace of Sebulba and homeworld of the Dug.	
Malastare	Star Wars: The Clone Wars	2010	TV series	Forested planet where podracing is popular. Birthplace of Sebulba and homeworld of the Dug.	
Manaan	Star Wars Legends: Star Wars: Knights of the Old Republic	2003	Video game	Homeworld of the Selkath. The ocean planet is the only known natural source of a medical substance known as kolto, which was eventually replaced with bacta.	
Manaan	Star Wars: Aftermath	2015	Novel (mentioned)	Homeworld of the Selkath. The ocean planet is the only known natural source of a medical substance known as kolto, which was eventually replaced with bacta.	
Manaan	Star Wars Jedi: Fallen Order	2019	Video game (mentioned)	Homeworld of the Selkath. The ocean planet is the only known natural source of a medical substance known as kolto, which was eventually replaced with bacta.	
Mandalore	Star Wars Legends: Marvel Star Wars	1982	Comics	Outer Rim planet that is the homeworld of the Mandalorians torn by wars between Mandalorians and Jedi and eventually purged by the Empire, scattering the few Mandalorians throughout the galaxy (including Bo-Katan). Mandalore has one moon, Concordia, which is fully inhabited.	
Mandalore	Star Wars: The Clone Wars	2010	TV series	Outer Rim planet that is the homeworld of the Mandalorians torn by wars between Mandalorians and Jedi and eventually purged by the Empire, scattering the few Mandalorians throughout the galaxy (including Bo-Katan). Mandalore has one moon, Concordia, which is fully inhabited.	
Mapuzo	Obi-Wan Kenobi	2022	TV series	A planet desertified by Galactic Empire where Ben Kenobi and Leia Organa are hiding; first rematch between Kenobi and Vader.	
Maridun	Star Wars Legends: Star Wars: Empire	2004	Comics	Grassy planet remaining undiscovered until the Clone Wars. Homeworld of the Amani race and a Lurmen colony.	
Maridun	Star Wars: The Clone Wars	2009	TV series	Grassy planet remaining undiscovered until the Clone Wars. Homeworld of the Amani race and a Lurmen colony.	
Mimban	Star Wars Legends: Splinter of the Mind's Eye	1978	Book	Swamp planet with perpetual fog and overcast sky. According to the Legends canon, it was the site of Luke Skywalker’s initial confrontation with Darth Vader.	
Mimban	Star Wars: The Clone Wars	2008	TV series (mentioned)	Swamp planet with perpetual fog and overcast sky. According to the Legends canon, it was the site of Luke Skywalker’s initial confrontation with Darth Vader.	
Mimban	Solo: A Star Wars Story	2018	Film	Swamp planet with perpetual fog and overcast sky. According to the Legends canon, it was the site of Luke Skywalker’s initial confrontation with Darth Vader.	
Mina-Rau	Andor	2025	TV series	A grassy, agrarian planet covered in wheat fields spanning towards the horizon, inhabited by farmers looking for a simple life. It is used as a refugee site for several of Cassian Andor's friends after they had fled from Ferrix.	
Mon Cala	Star Wars Legends: Dark Empire	1991	Comics	Ocean planet, home to the Mon Calamari and Quarren species. Also known as Mon Calamari, or Dac.	
Mon Cala	Star Wars: The Clone Wars	2011	TV series	Ocean planet, home to the Mon Calamari and Quarren species. Also known as Mon Calamari, or Dac.	
Moraband	Star Wars: The Clone Wars	2014	TV series	Home planet of ancient Sith lords. Known as Korriban in Legends.	
Mortis	Star Wars: The Clone Wars	2011	TV series	Planet existing in the spiritual realm within the Force, with a wall surrounding it, home to the three near-omnipotent Force wielders known only in the Jedi Archives as the Mortis Gods. It is said that "the planet is a conduit through which the Force flows."	
Mustafar	Revenge of the Sith	2005	Film	Volcanic planet and Sith world used by the Techno Union to mine for valuable materials. Hiding place of the Separatist Council during the final days of the Clone Wars, and the location of the duel between Anakin Skywalker and Obi-Wan Kenobi that results in Anakin's disfigurement. During the Imperial Era, it is the location of Darth Vader's personal stronghold. In the VR game Vader Immortal, it is revealed that Mustafar was once forested and very populous, but was left devastated by an ancient battle. It later begins to slowly heal itself, and, by the time of The Rise of Skywalker, trees appear to have regrown on Mustafar's surface.	
Mygeeto	Revenge of the Sith	2005	Film	Cold, urban planet that served as a battle site in the final days of the Clone Wars, as well as the death place of Jedi Master Ki Adi Mundi by Order 66. Colony world of the Muun species and homeworld of the Lurmen race.	
Naboo	The Phantom Menace	1999	Film	Home planet of the Gungans, including Jar Jar Binks, and various humans, who compose a civilization called the Naboo, which includes Padmé Amidala and Palpatine.	
Nal Hutta	Star Wars Legends: Dark Empire	1991	Comics	Home planet of Jabba and other Hutts. Close to the urban moon of Nar Shaddaa.	
Nal Hutta	Star Wars: The Clone Wars	2010	TV series	Home planet of Jabba and other Hutts. Close to the urban moon of Nar Shaddaa.	
Narkina 5	Andor	2022	TV series	The fifth moon orbiting the gas giant Narkina, containing massive lakes, rocky islands, and snowy mesas. Many artificial island prison complexes are where hundreds of inmates are forced to build machines and weapons to power the Imperial Army.	
Nevarro	The Mandalorian	2019	TV series	A volcanic planet with black sands and lava flows, located in the Outer Rim Territories. Nevarro was a hub of the Bounty Hunter Guild as well as home to a Mandalorian covert in the early days of the New Republic.	
Niamos	Andor	2022	TV series	A warm, sunny resort planet with pleasant beaches and calm waters that serves as a destination for outlaws to hide. Under Imperial occupation, it was where Cassian Andor was arrested by Imperial shoretroopers and given a six-year sentence on Narkina 5.	
Numidian Prime	Solo: A Star Wars Story	2018	Film	Rainforest paradise that is a haven to smugglers and thieves.	
Nur	Star Wars Jedi: Fallen Order	2019	Video game	A water moon of Mustafar, base of Fortress Inquisitorius where Ben Kenobi rescues Leia Organa.	
Oba Diah	Star Wars: The Clone Wars	2014	TV series	Location of the Pyke Syndicate's stronghold.	
Observatory Moon	Star Wars: Skeleton Crew	2024	TV series	A frigid moon orbiting a swirling gas giant. Features an ancient telescopic array operated by the astronomer, Kh’ymm. The formal name of this moon, if any, is not currently known, nor is the name of the planet it orbits.	
Olega	The Acolyte	2024	TV series	A planet where the Jedi Order operates a High Republic-era Jedi temple.	
Onderon	Star Wars Legends: Tales of the Jedi	1994	Comics	Jungle planet where Anakin Skywalker and his padawan Ahsoka Tano lead a revolt against its Separatist-controlled usurpatory king Sanjay Rush during the Clone Wars; homeworld of Saw Gerrera.	
Onderon	Star Wars: The Clone Wars	2012	TV series	Jungle planet where Anakin Skywalker and his padawan Ahsoka Tano lead a revolt against its Separatist-controlled usurpatory king Sanjay Rush during the Clone Wars; homeworld of Saw Gerrera.	
Ord Mantell	The Empire Strikes Back	1980	Film (mentioned as Ord Mandell)	A planet where Han Solo tells of having a run-in with a bounty hunter.	
Ord Mantell	Star Wars Legends: The Bounty Hunter of Ord Mantell	1981	Comics	A planet where Han Solo tells of having a run-in with a bounty hunter.	
Ossus	The Force Awakens	2015	Film	A verdant planet; home of Luke Skywalker's Jedi Temple. First introduced in the Legends comic series Tales of the Jedi.	
Pabu	Star Wars: The Bad Batch	2023	TV series	An ocean planet containing an idyllic, thriving village of refugees, fishermen, and moon-yo monkeys on Pabu Island, which would experience seismic activities and sea surges, yet the village would endure and rebuild. Clone Force 99 went into hiding on this planet with help from pirate Phee Genoa after cutting ties with Cid.	
Pasaana	The Rise of Skywalker	2019	Film	A desert planet on the edge of the galaxy, home to the Aki-Aki species.	
Peridea	Ahsoka	2023	TV series	A barren planet where both Ezra Bridger and Grand Admiral Thrawn were exiled after the events of Star Wars Rebels. The only known extragalactic planet after Kamino.	
Pillio	Star Wars Battlefront II	2017	Video game	Uncolonized aquatic planet with over 3 million species, and the location of one of Darth Sidious' observatories.	
Polis Massa	Revenge of the Sith	2005	Film	Outer Rim planetoid within an asteroid field of the same name; birthplace of Luke Skywalker and Leia Organa.	
Raada	Ahsoka (novel)	2016	Book	Farming moon in the Outer Rim, where Ahsoka Tano hid under the name "Ashla" after Order 66.	
Rishi	Star Wars Legends: Dark Force Rising	1992	Book	Tropical planet used by the Republic to monitor the nearby cloning facility on Kamino. In Legends it was the homeworld of the Rishii race.	
Rishi	Star Wars: The Clone Wars	2008	TV series	Tropical planet used by the Republic to monitor the nearby cloning facility on Kamino. In Legends it was the homeworld of the Rishii race.	
Rodia	Star Wars Legends: Shadows of the Empire	1996	Book	Home planet of the Rodians, including Greedo. A remote swampy, jungle planet, it was represented by Onaconda Farr in the Galactic Senate during the Clone Wars.	
Rodia	Star Wars: The Clone Wars	2008	TV series	Home planet of the Rodians, including Greedo. A remote swampy, jungle planet, it was represented by Onaconda Farr in the Galactic Senate during the Clone Wars.	
Rugosa	Star Wars: The Clone Wars	2008	TV series	A moon that consists of giant coral reefs. Yoda meets King Katuunko of the Toydarians here after being tested in battle by the Separatist Droid Army, during the early days of the Clone Wars. It is here where King Katuunko pledges Toydaria's allegiance to the Galactic Republic.	
Ruusan	Star Wars Legends: Star Wars Jedi Knight: Dark Forces II	1997	Video game	Barren planet housing the Valley of the Jedi. Site of a great battle between the Sith and the Jedi. In Legends the sith lord Darth Bane created the Rule of Two here.	
Ruusan	Star Wars: The Clone Wars	2008	TV series	Barren planet housing the Valley of the Jedi. Site of a great battle between the Sith and the Jedi. In Legends the sith lord Darth Bane created the Rule of Two here.	
Ryloth	Star Wars Legends: Tales from Jabba's Palace	1995	Book	Dry, hot home planet of the Twi'leks, including Hera Syndulla and Jedi Master Aayla Secura.	
Ryloth	Star Wars: The Clone Wars	2009	TV series	Dry, hot home planet of the Twi'leks, including Hera Syndulla and Jedi Master Aayla Secura.	
Saleucami	Revenge of the Sith	2005	Film	Primary terrain deserts and swamps. Home of the clone trooper deserter Cut Lawquane. Jedi Master Stass Allie is killed here during the Great Jedi Purge.	
Savareen	Star Wars Legends: Star Wars Adventure Journal 9	1996	Comics	Desert and ocean planet where destitute villages farm wind and refine coaxium. In Solo: A Star Wars Story, the Millennium Falcon arrives there after Han and his crew steal coaxium from Kessel, and Dryden Vos and Tobias Beckett die there.	
Savareen	Solo: A Star Wars Story	2018	Film	Desert and ocean planet where destitute villages farm wind and refine coaxium. In Solo: A Star Wars Story, the Millennium Falcon arrives there after Han and his crew steal coaxium from Kessel, and Dryden Vos and Tobias Beckett die there.	
Scarif	Star Wars Battlefront – Rogue One: Scarif	2016	Video game DLC	Oceanic "paradise world" used for construction of the Death Star after the project was moved from Geonosis during the Imperial Era. When Rebel Alliance members raid the Imperial database from the secret base on one of its tropical islands, the planet is destroyed to impede their escape with the Death Star plans.	
Scarif	Rogue One	2016	Film	Oceanic "paradise world" used for construction of the Death Star after the project was moved from Geonosis during the Imperial Era. When Rebel Alliance members raid the Imperial database from the secret base on one of its tropical islands, the planet is destroyed to impede their escape with the Death Star plans.	
Scipio	Star Wars: The Clone Wars	2014	TV series	Snow-covered, mountainous planet in the Outer Rim Territories. Headquarters of the InterGalactic Banking Clan. Former Senator Rush Clovis is killed here during the Republic counterattack on the planet.	
Seatos	Ahsoka	2023	TV series	A forest planet with red-leaved trees. Location of the Reflex Point and where Morgan Elsbeth's ship, the Eye of Sion, is built.	
Serenno	Star Wars Legends: Darth Bane: Rule of Two	2007	Comics	A planet in the Outer Rim Territories. Homeworld of Count Dooku.	
Serenno	Star Wars: The Clone Wars	2011	TV series	A planet in the Outer Rim Territories. Homeworld of Count Dooku.	
Shili	Star Wars: The Clone Wars	2012	TV series	Home planet of the Togruta, including Jedi Council member Shaak Ti and Padawan Ahsoka Tano.	
Sienar TF73	Andor	2025	TV series	Also known as Sienar or 73, it is a snowy planet owned by Sienar Fleet Systems, and was one of many numbered planets owned by the company. It hosted Sienar Test Facility 73 which was infiltrated by Cassian Andor, who stole a prototype TIE Avenger for the Axis network.	
Sissubo	Star Wars Squadrons	2020	Video game	Seventh Planet of the Chandrila system. It is surrounded by a debris field of remnants of Imperial Ships.	
Skako Minor	Star Wars: The Clone Wars	2020	TV series	Home planet of Wat Tambor. Known for its highly pressurized atmosphere, necessitating specialized suits to be worn by all off-world Skakoans.	
Sorgan	The Mandalorian	2019	TV series	A forested backwater planet in the Outer Rim mostly populated by human farmers who harvest krill which is used to make spotchka, a popular drink on the planet. Local farmers are constantly attacked by Klatooinians.	
Subterrel	Attack of the Clones	2002	Film (mentioned)	Mining planet mentioned by Dexter Jettster who spent time prospecting there. Located near Kamino, beyond the Outer Rim.	
Sullust	Return of the Jedi	1983	Film (mentioned)	A volcanic planet whose atmosphere was highly toxic forcing the native Sullustans to build technologically advanced subterranean cities. It was the base of Imperial factories and the SoroSuub corporation employed roughly half the population.	
Sullust	Star Wars: Rogue Squadron	1998	Video game	A volcanic planet whose atmosphere was highly toxic forcing the native Sullustans to build technologically advanced subterranean cities. It was the base of Imperial factories and the SoroSuub corporation employed roughly half the population.	
Sullust	Star Wars: Battlefront	2015	Video game	A volcanic planet whose atmosphere was highly toxic forcing the native Sullustans to build technologically advanced subterranean cities. It was the base of Imperial factories and the SoroSuub corporation employed roughly half the population.	
Takodana	The Force Awakens	2015	Film	Forest planet and site of Maz Kanata's castle. Neutral territory between First Order and Resistance.	
Tanalorr	Star Wars Jedi: Survivor	2023	Video game	A planet strong with the Force, hidden inside a nebula near Koboh. Home of Dagan Gera's Jedi Temple.	
Taris	Star Wars Legends: Star Wars: Knights of the Old Republic	2003	Video game	A heavily populated urban planet, destroyed by Darth Malak's bombardment in 3956 BBY.	
Taris	Star Wars: Aftermath	2015	Novel	A heavily populated urban planet, destroyed by Darth Malak's bombardment in 3956 BBY.	
Tatooine	A New Hope	1977	Film	Desert planet and childhood home of Anakin Skywalker and Luke Skywalker. Location of Jabba the Hutt's palace. Possibly has the most appearances in the franchise than any other planet.	
Telos	Star Wars Legends: Star Wars: Knights of the Old Republic II: The Sith Lords	2004	Video game	Previously identified as Telos IV in Legends continuity, Telos is a mountainous planet in the Outer Rim that was razed under Darth Malak's orders, rendering the planet uninhabitable. Homeworld of one of Revan's companions aboard the Ebon Hawk, Carth Onasi.	
Telos	Catalyst: A Rogue One Novel	2016	Novel (mentioned)	Previously identified as Telos IV in Legends continuity, Telos is a mountainous planet in the Outer Rim that was razed under Darth Malak's orders, rendering the planet uninhabitable. Homeworld of one of Revan's companions aboard the Ebon Hawk, Carth Onasi.	
Telos	Star Wars: Skeleton Crew	2024	TV series (mentioned)	Previously identified as Telos IV in Legends continuity, Telos is a mountainous planet in the Outer Rim that was razed under Darth Malak's orders, rendering the planet uninhabitable. Homeworld of one of Revan's companions aboard the Ebon Hawk, Carth Onasi.	
Teth	The Clone Wars	2008	Film	During the Clone Wars, Jabba's son Rotta is abducted by the Separatists and brought to this planet. Anakin and Ahsoka Tano travel to Teth and rescue Rotta from Asajj Ventress.	
Toydaria	Star Wars: The Clone Wars	2010	TV series	Home planet of Watto and other Toydarians. Close to Nal Hutta.	
Trandosha	Star Wars Legends: The Mandalorian Armor	1998	Book (mentioned)	Homeworld of the Trandoshan hunters. In the same solar system as Kashyyyk.	
Trandosha	Star Wars: The Clone Wars	2011	TV series	Homeworld of the Trandoshan hunters. In the same solar system as Kashyyyk.	
Ueda	The Acolyte	2024	TV Series	Planet home to a village that contained the Lomi Usqi Noodle Shop.	
Umbara	Star Wars: The Clone Wars	2011	TV series	Planet with a thick, foggy atmosphere, known as the "Shadow World" due to the lack of sunlight on its surface. Home to the Umbarans.	
Utapau	Revenge of the Sith	2005	Film	Remote planet, covered in deep sinkholes and home to the Utai and Pau'ans. Site of General Grievous' death and a separatist base during the last days of the Clone Wars.	
Vandor	Solo: A Star Wars Story	2018	Film	Icy, mountainous planet that is the site of a Crimson Dawn train heist led by Tobias Beckett in Solo: A Star Wars Story.	
Vardos	Star Wars Battlefront II	2017	Video game	Imperial stronghold and home to Iden and Garrick Versio. One of the first targets of Operation: Cinder, and later a First Order base for their kidnapping of children to become the next generation of stormtroopers.	
Wayland	Star Wars Legends: Heir to the Empire	1991	Book	A mountainous jungle planet where the Empire conducts cloning experiments and imprisons decommissioned and seditious clone troopers atop a hidden base on Mount Tantiss. In Legends, Grand Admiral Thrawn gains access to one of Palpatine's stockpiles.	
Wayland	Star Wars: The Bad Batch	2021	TV series	A mountainous jungle planet where the Empire conducts cloning experiments and imprisons decommissioned and seditious clone troopers atop a hidden base on Mount Tantiss. In Legends, Grand Admiral Thrawn gains access to one of Palpatine's stockpiles.	
Wobani	Rogue One	2016	Film	A desolate wasteland and the site of an Imperial penal labor colony.	
Wrea	Star Wars Legends: The New Rebellion	1996	Book	A planet near an asteroid field where Saw Gerrara raises Jyn Erso after her father is taken by the Empire.	
Wrea	Star Wars: Rebel Rising	2017	Book	A planet near an asteroid field where Saw Gerrara raises Jyn Erso after her father is taken by the Empire.	
Yavin	Star Wars	1977	Film	Gas planet with several moons, including Yavin 4.	
Yavin 4	Star Wars	1977	Film	Forest moon and base for the Rebel Alliance.	
Zeffo	Star Wars Jedi: Fallen Order	2019	Video game	A planet with many mountains and stormy weather. Featuring ancient ruins and tombs, imperial excavations, and a crashed Venator near an ancient tomb.	
Zygerria	Star Wars: The Clone Wars	2011	TV series	A planet in the Outer Rim Territories home of the Zygerrian species. Zygerria was also known for a slave empire.	

== Legends planets and moons ==
These are planets with multiple appearances in the Star Wars Expanded Universe, now rebranded as Star Wars Legends. The accompanying works were declared non-canon by Lucasfilm in April 2014, following its acquisition by The Walt Disney Company in October 2012.

Name	First appearance	Year	Media	Fictional description	Ref(s)
Abregado-rae	Heir to the Empire	1991	Book	The base of operations for the smuggler Talon Karrde. Remains canon.	
Ambria	Tales of the Jedi	1991	Comics	The site of an ancient battle between Jedi and Sith and the resting-place of Darth Bane. Remains canon.	
Anoth	Dark Apprentice	1994	Book	Rocky planet used to conceal the newly born Solo children.	
Arkania	Tales of the Jedi	1994	Comics	Gem mining planet with humanoid inhabitants. Remains canon.	
Bakura	The Truce at Bakura	1993	Book	Peaceful planet which issues a distress call when invaded by the Ssi-ruuk. Homeworld of the Kurtzen race. Remains canon.	
Bonadan	Han Solo's Revenge	1979	Book	Corporate sector planet which lures a young Han Solo into a trap. Remains canon.	
Borleias	Rogue Squadron	1996	Book	Planet used as a stepping-stone for the New Republic to retake Coruscant.	
Byss	Dark Empire	1991	Comics	Planet chosen as the base of operations for a clone of Emperor Palpatine. Located very close to the center of the galaxy. It is destroyed by the Dark Empire's weapon, the Galaxy Gun. Included in at least one canon map.	
Carida	Jedi Search	1994	Book	Planet destroyed by the vengeful ex-Jedi Kyp Durron. Remains canon due to Han training there after enlisting in the Empire.	
Da Soocha V	Dark Empire	1991	Comics	Moon in Hutt space housing a provisional Rebel base under siege from the Palpatine clone. Capital of the New Republic between the Dark Empire recapture of Coruscant and its destruction. It is destroyed by the Galaxy Gun.	
Drall	Ambush at Corellia	1995	Book	A planet in the Corellian system whose inhabitants, the Drall, try to keep a low profile.	
Dromund Kaas	Star Wars Jedi Knight: Mysteries of the Sith	1998	Video game	A jungle planet and capital world of the Resurgent Sith Empire. Consumed with dark side energy and heavily electrified, site of the Imperial Citadel.	
Dxun	Tales of the Jedi	1993	Comics	Largest of the four moons of Onderon. Covered in dense jungles teeming with predatory animals. The location of Mandalore the Indomitable's death near the end of the Great Sith War. Remains canon.	
Hapes	The Courtship of Princess Leia	1994	Book	Planet whose prince tries to marry Princess Leia. Remains canon.	
Honoghr	Dark Force Rising	1992	Book	Planet whose warrior race is recruited by Grand Admiral Thrawn. Homeworld of the Noghri race.	
Ithor	Children of the Jedi	1995	Book	Forest planet inhabited by pacifists who run a tourism industry. Homeworld of the Ithorian race.	
J't'p'tan	Before the Storm	1996	Book	A planet where Luke Skywalker tries to learn the identity of his mother.	
Khomm	Darksaber	1995	Book	Planet home to an insular society of clones. Homeworld of the Khommite race.	
Korriban	Tales of the Jedi	1994	Comics	A planet used by generations of Sith lords. Known as Moraband in canon works.	
Kothlis	Shadows of the Empire	1996	Book	Bothan colony with a facility housing the second Death Star's plans.	
Lehon	Star Wars: Knights of the Old Republic	2003	Video game	Also known as Rakata Prime and the Unknown World ingame in Knights of the Old Republic, it is the homeworld of the Rakata species and the capital of their former Infinite Empire.	
Lwhekk	The Truce at Bakura	1993	Book (mentioned)	Home planet of the Ssi-ruuk military society. Remains canon.	
Lwhekk	Star Wars: Empire at War	2006	Video game	Home planet of the Ssi-ruuk military society. Remains canon.	
Muunilinst	Specter of the Past	1997	Book	Capital of the Intergalactic Banking Clan and homeworld of the Muun race, which includes Separatist leader San Hill and Sith Lord Darth Plagueis. The site of battles depicted in Star Wars: Clone Wars.	
Myrkr	Heir to the Empire	1991	Book	Treacherous swamp planet used by Talon Karrde and Mara Jade. Remains canon.	
N'zoth	Before the Storm	1996	Book	Desert planet home to a violent and genocidal species called Yevetha. Remains canon.	
Nkllon	Heir to the Empire	1991	Book	Barren planet, home to a mining venture by Lando Calrissian.	
Peragus II	Star Wars Knights of the Old Republic II: The Sith Lords	2004	Video game	A destroyed Outer Rim planet rich in low-grade engine fuel, an accident during early mining attempts caused the planet to explode, exposing the core and forming an asteroid field. The mining facility built there was the only exporter of fuel to Telos IV, and was destroyed during Darth Sion's attempt to capture the Jedi Exile Meetra Surik.	
Ralltiir	Star Wars (radio)	1981	Radio drama	Core world and galactic trading centre, occupied by Imperial forces under Lord Tion.	
Rattatak	Star Wars: Clone Wars	2003	TV series	Outer Rim planet and former home to Asajj Ventress. Homeworld of the white-skinned Rattataki. Ruled by various warlords. Remains canon after being mentioned in the novel Resistance Reborn.	
Sacorria	Ambush at Corellia	1995	Book	Planet near Corellia which attempts a coup against the New Republic.	
Selonia	Assault at Selonia	1996	Book	Ocean planet and the original home of many who reside on Sacorria. Homeworld of the Selonian race.	
Thyferra	The Bacta War	1997	Book	Rainforest planet controlled by the Bacta Cartel. Homweorld of the Vratix race.	
Toprawa	Star Wars (radio)	1981	Radio drama	Imperial security facility and source of the first Death Star plans (supplanted by Scarif in Rogue One).	
Vortex	Dark Apprentice	1994	Book	A planet disrupted by an accidental crash of Admiral Ackbar's ship. Homeworld of the Vor race.	
Zonama Sekot	Rogue Planet	2000	Book	A living, sentient world capable of traveling through space; source of the fastest ships in the galaxy. It is the seed of Yuuzhan'Tar, the Yuuzhan Vong homeworld.	

== Similarities to real-world planets ==
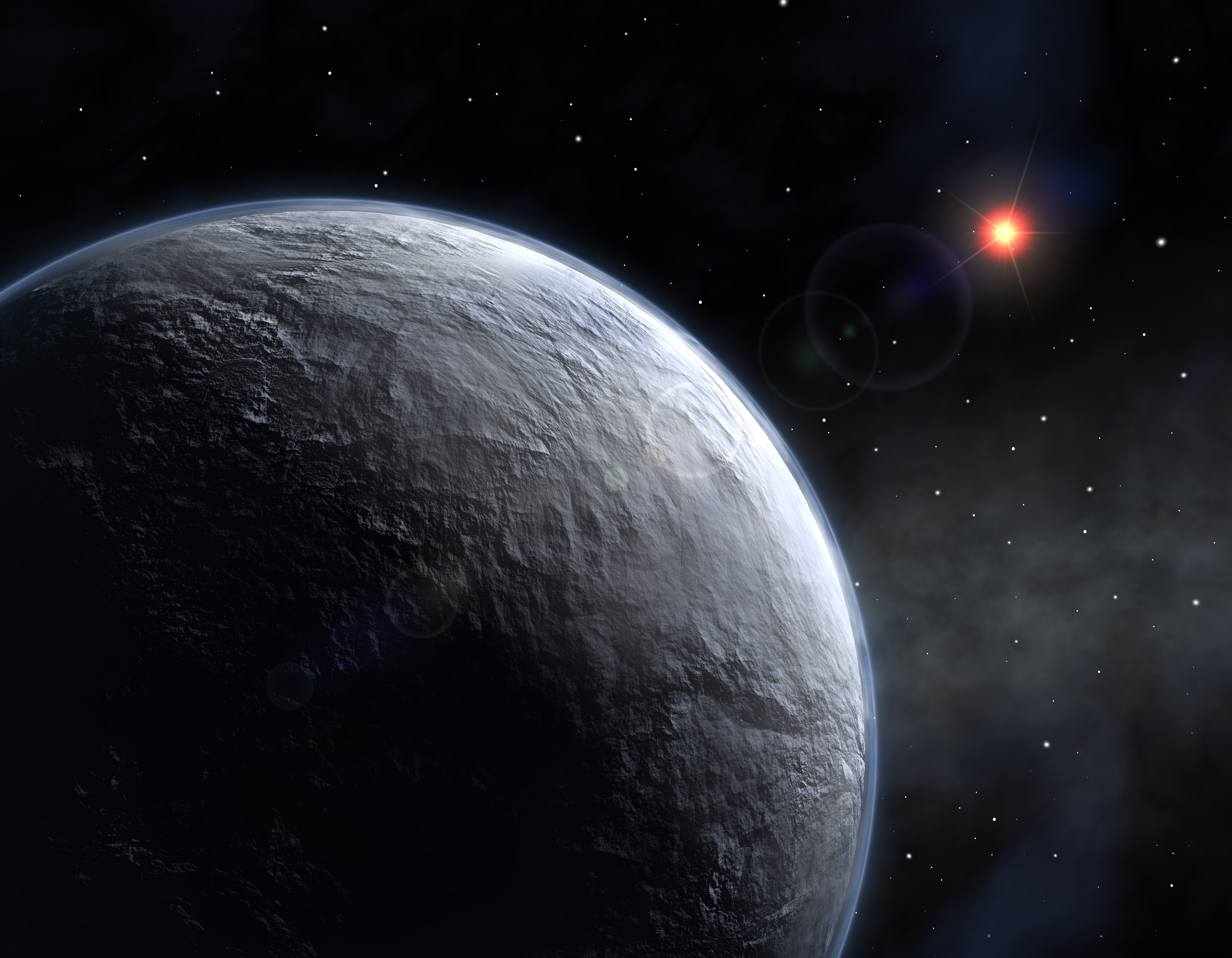
ESO artist's impression of OGLE-2005-BLG-390Lb, an exoplanet compared to the ice planet Hoth

The discovery of exoplanets in the real-world universe gained pace in the early 21st century. In 2015, the US space agency NASA published an article which stated that many of the newly discovered astronomical bodies possessed scientifically confirmed properties that are similar to planets in the fictional Star Wars universe.

Kepler-452b, a rocky super-Earth-type planet, is said to be similar to the Star Wars planet Coruscant. Likewise, the planets Kepler-16b and Kepler-453b, planets discovered orbiting binary stars probably resemble the desert world Tatooine. The hot, molten worlds of Kepler-10b and Kepler-78b are comparable to the volcanic planet Mustafar. OGLE-2005-BLG-390Lb, a cold, remote exoplanet, is like the ice planet Hoth. Kepler-22b, thought by scientists to be an ocean planet, is compared to the planet Kamino. According to NASA, there are also similarities to Alderaan and Endor in the real-world universe.

=== Solar System ===
Two non-canonical works also feature the real-life Solar System's planets. Monsters and Aliens from George Lucas (1993) contains a feature, presented as a clip from a gossip column, in which a pair of Duros are abducted by humans and taken to "Urthha" (Earth), where they create havoc by misunderstanding terrestrial objects. In issue #19 of the comic series Star Wars Tales (2004), the story "Into the Great Unknown" depicts Han Solo and Chewbacca jumping to hyperspace without doing the calculations and landing in North America, where Han dies, and Chewbacca inspires the legend of the sasquatch, later tracked by archaeologist Indiana Jones.

== See also ==
- List of Star Wars filming locations
- Planets in science fiction
