= Sarlacc =

Star Wars creature

- Star Wars race
- The original Sarlacc in Return of the Jedi (1983)
- First appearance: "Return of the Jedi"; (1983)
- Last appearance: "The Book of Boba Fett (2022)"
- Created by: George Lucas
- Genre: Science fiction

In-universe information
- Home world: Tatooine

The Sarlacc (plural Sarlacci) is a fictional creature in George Lucas's sci-fi action saga Star Wars. It first appeared in the film Return of the Jedi (1983) as a multi-tentacled alien beast whose immense, gaping maw is lined with several rows of sharp teeth, inhabiting the Great Pit of Carkoon, a hollow in the sand of the desert planet Tatooine. After the bounty hunter Boba Fett escapes from its maw in "Chapter 1: Stranger in a Strange Land" of The Book of Boba Fett (2022) and eventually returns to retrieve his armor, the Sarlacc is killed by his partner Fennec Shand in "Chapter 4: The Gathering Storm".

In the original Return of the Jedi, the Sarlacc is depicted as a barbed gaping mouth in the desert sand with tentacles. The 1997 Special Edition of the film added computer-generated tentacles and a beak to the mouth, which has remained its canonical depiction since. Besides Return of the Jedi, the creature and others like it are featured in Star Wars literature.

Like other aspects of Star Wars, the Sarlacc became a part of popular culture. The creature was incorporated into the merchandising campaign that accompanied the release of Return of the Jedi. It is the subject of analysis and humor in works of literature unassociated with Star Wars.

== Depiction ==
The Sarlacc first appeared in the 1983 film Return of the Jedi, wherein Jabba the Hutt attempts to drop Luke Skywalker, Han Solo, and Chewbacca into the creature's mouth; but Luke frees himself and the others with the aid of Lando Calrissian and R2-D2, while Princess Leia strangles Jabba.

According to the Star Wars Databank, the Sarlacci inhabit remote, inhospitable locations in the galaxy, but defy taxonomic classification, insofar as most texts claim that the Sarlacc is an arthropod (as in The Essential Guide to Alien Species and The Wildlife of Star Wars), while its anchored root system and spore-based method of reproduction suggest a plant origin. A Sarlacc reproduces by releasing spores through outer space, which arrive on a planet or asteroid, and there excavate a pit to capture prey.

Steve Sansweet's Star Wars Encyclopedia describes the Sarlacc as an "omnivorous, multi-tentacled creature with needle-sharp teeth and a large beak". The Sarlacc rests at the base of a giant pit where the entirety of its body is buried except for the gaping mouth, which may reach three meters (10 feet) in diameter. The Sarlacc uses its four legs to anchor itself underground. Astrophysicist and science fiction author Jeanne Cavelos compares the Sarlacc's hunting method to that of the antlion. The Sarlacc's mouth also has similarities with that of the lamprey.

Because most Sarlacci inhabit isolated environments and rely on prey to stumble into their pit, they rarely feed; the digestive system dissolves prey into nutrients over a period of several thousand years. If no living prey is available, a Sarlacc relies on its root system to absorb nutrients. One Sarlacc located on an airless moon feeds on cometary material rich in oxygen, hydrogen, carbon, and nitrogen.

The Sarlacc's stomach is lined with vessels that attach themselves to a swallowed victim and maws for quick digestion or breaking apart of large prey. The maws close when exposed to bright lights. The stomach also contains neurotoxins, which induce hallucinations in prey which "suggest that the Sarlacc somehow absorbs the intelligence of all its victims, who live on in disembodied torment". A Sarlacc can communicate with its victims through this stolen consciousness: In one Star Wars short story, an unnamed Jedi explains that "Sarlacci do interesting things with messenger RNA: over the course of millennia, they can attain a sort of group consciousness, built out of the remains of people they've digested. I talked to such a Sarlacc, once a few decades ago".

A Jawa with the spore of a Sarlacc from "Fortune, Fate, and the Natural History of the Sarlacc", Star Wars Tales 6 (2000)

In the anthology Tales from Jabba's Palace (1995), edited by Kevin J. Anderson, Dan'l Danehy Oakes's story "Shaara and the Sarlacc: The Skiff Guard's Tale" is told by one of Jabba the Hutt's soldiers, who tells Boba Fett that his sister Shaara and her Imperial stormtrooper captors were thrown into the pit, whereupon the Sarlacc swallowed the stormtroopers, but expelled Shaara, for reasons unknown. In the short story "A Barve Like That: The Tale of Boba Fett", by Daniel Keys Moran under the pseudonym of J. D. Montgomery, Boba Fett struggles to free himself from the belly of the Sarlacc. As Fett is digested, the creature converses with him mentally in the voice of an alien named Susejo, eaten by the Sarlacc four thousand years earlier. Having caused his jet pack to explode, Fett uses a concussion grenade to blast himself free. Years later, Fett is recognized by the Sarlacc upon approach.

In the non-canonical Dark Horse comic book "Fortune, Fate, and the Natural History of the Sarlacc", written by Mark Schultz and illustrated by Kellie Strom, the Sarlacc seen in Return of the Jedi is the offspring of an older Sarlacc on Tatooine. Shortly after the execution of an unknown alien named Grubbat Fhilch, the Sarlacc releases a spore that attaches to an Imperial stormtrooper's dewback. The stormtroopers hire a group of Jawa scavengers to clean the dewbacks, from which one Jawa acquires the spore, and places it in a jar of water. The young Sarlacc escapes from the jar only to be swallowed by a spider-like creature, which it consumes from within, and later forms the Great Pit of Carkoon.

Sarlacci have made minor appearances in Star Wars video games such as Super Star Wars (1992), Shadows of the Empire (1996), Star Wars: Demolition (2000), Star Wars: Bounty Hunter (2002), Star Wars Rogue Squadron III: Rebel Strike (2003), and Star Wars: Battlefront (2004). The MMORPG Star Wars Galaxies (2003) shows one of the smaller Sarlacci in the Star Wars galaxy on the remote planet Dathomir. It has also made an appearance in Lego Star Wars II: The Original Trilogy, Lego Star Wars: The Complete Saga, "Lego Star Wars: The Skywalker Saga" 2022 Star Wars: Empire at War, MMORPG Star Wars: The Old Republic and Star Wars: The Force Unleashed (2008), where a Sarlacc much larger than the one on Tatooine is first an ally of a Jedi Knight, and later used as a base for the Empire (even building structures inside the creature itself). A duel is fought beside the Sarlacc in this game between Starkiller and Shaak Ti, until Ti falls backwards into the Sarlacc's open mouth. The Rise Against the Empire playset of Disney Infinity 3.0 (2015) has the famous Sarlacc and Pit of Carkoon outside Tatooine, around which stand several Jawa, and the player can pick up a Jawa to throw in.

In Super Star Wars, the "Sarlacc Pit Monster" acts as a boss early into the game. It is depicted as a large, worm-like creature with tentacles, and shoots rocks at Luke.

The first episode of The Book of Boba Fett shows a scene of the title character inside the Sarlacc's innards, as he breathes from a dead stormtrooper's respirator and escapes from the pit by blasting through with his flamethrower. In episode four, The Gathering Storm, the Sarlacc is killed by a seismic charge dropped by Slave I.

== Concept and creation ==
Concept art for the Sarlacc by Industrial Light & Magic

The design of the Sarlacc creature—originally called the "Sloth Pit"—seen in Return of the Jedi evolved during the concept, creation, and filming processes. Early concept sketches portrayed a creature with several moving tentacles and a pronounced beak; but Star Wars creator George Lucas did not have the technology or financial resources to realize this concept in the 1983 film.

Special effects artists Stuart Freeborn, Phil Tippett, and the crew of Industrial Light & Magic (ILM) constructed a pit in the desert sands of Yuma, Arizona, that contained a gaping mouth with jagged teeth and tentacles. At the time, the pit (with Jabba the Hutt's sail barge) constituted one of the largest motion picture sets ever constructed. A hydraulic system was designed to animate the creature, but the blowing sand clogged the mechanism. The film crew instead used poles and wires to move the creature's tentacles. Lucas was not satisfied with the effect, complaining, "There was nothing alive about the whole thing."

Working on the giant set was an arduous task, according to the crew members involved. Tippett told Starlog magazine, "We were working the creature at the bottom of a gorge, so we got no breeze. Sand constantly fell down upon us". In addition to operating the Sarlacc, many technicians were standing in as skiff guards in full wardrobe. Tippett remarks, "[We] were covered with [sand and] glue from the costumes. I almost cracked on that one. I think I cried, it was so terrible." Actress Carrie Fisher recalled that many of the crew and stuntmen who fell into the creature during filming suffered broken legs and sprained ankles. ILM crew members received some satisfaction when they dismantled the set at the conclusion of filming and sold it to Mexico as scrap. The one condition of the sale was that the materials were not to be resold as souvenirs.

The Special Edition version of the Sarlacc with CGI beak and tentacles

The Sarlacc design underwent a series of changes when Lucas released the Special Edition of Return of the Jedi in 1997. Employing the new technology of computer-generated imagery (CGI), ILM amended the creature's appearance with the addition of CGI tentacles and a beak inside the Sarlacc's mouth. According to Lucas, it "just looks much more realistic and more threatening ... it helps the scene considerably." Subsequent depictions of the Sarlacc in Star Wars fiction are based on this revised design.

Some of the special effects from the 1983 film were retained in the Special Edition. The tentacle that captures the skiff guard Kithaba and pulls him into the Sarlacc mouth is from the original film, as well as the tentacle that attaches to Lando Calrissian's leg.

== In popular culture ==
Aside from Star Wars fiction and merchandising, popular fiction author Stefan Demetriou uses the Sarlacc as a descriptive term for slowness, a reference to the creature's extended digestive process.

The Sarlacc became part of Return of the Jedi's merchandising campaign that accompanied the theatrical release of the film. Parker Brothers produced a board game in 1983 called Battle at Sarlacc's Pit that was sold in the United States and Canada. Players collect points for battling their way through Gamorrean guards, Boba Fett, and a Nikto on Jabba the Hutt's sail barge, pushing them overboard into a cardboard Sarlacc. The game, which sold for only a few years, is a collector's item.

Hollywood journalist and humor writer Peter Biskind muses that George Lucas went to great extremes to remove aspects of sex and sexuality from the plot of the Star Wars films. Biskind, however, asserts that Lucas created a "nightmarishly explicit image of threatening female sexuality" in the form of the Sarlacc: "The Jabba episode culminates in an explicit vagina dentata fantasy, as Luke and his pals have to walk a phallic gangplank into the pullulating maw—festooned with long, curved teeth—of the giant Sarlacc in its 'nesting place'." Premiere magazine reviewer Tim Bissell complained, "Lucas sent his trilogy’s most arresting character Boba Fett to a "death" so inglorious—falling headlong into the vagina dentata of Tatooine's Sarlacc—that its only payoff was a burp gag."

In the TV series Peep Show, Mark Corrigan references "the pit of Sarlacc" when finishing off the remains of a packet of crisps.

In 2018, a cave that was discovered in British Columbia, Canada was unofficially named Sarlacc's Pit.

In the TV series Ghost Wars (2017–2018), Billy McGrath (performed by Kim Coates) refers to the inability of people to leave town due to the events triggered by the earthquake. In conversation with town's major Val McGrath-Dufresne (performed by Luvia Petersen), Val points out that he had been able to get into town, so "If there's a way in, there's gotta be a way out", to which Billy replies "Tell that to a Sarlacc".

The front cover of Randall Munroe's book What If?: Serious Scientific Answers to Absurd Hypothetical Questions features a T. rex being lowered into a Sarlacc pit.

Lego released a set titled Desert Skiff & Sarlacc Pit featuring Han Solo, Luke Skywalker, Lando, Chewbacca, and Boba Fett.

== See also ==
- Sarlacc's Pit cave – a karst cave entrance in British Columbia, Canada
