= Boba Fett =

Star Wars character

- Star Wars character
- Jeremy Bulloch as Boba Fett
- First appearance: Star Wars Holiday Special (1978)
- Created by: George Lucas
- Portrayed by: Jeremy Bulloch (Note: The Empire Strikes Back Return of the Jedi); Daniel Logan (Note: Attack of the Clones); Dean De Anda (Note: "Star Tours: The Adventures Continue"); Temuera Morrison (Note: The Mandalorian The Book of Boba Fett); Finnegan Garay (Note: The Book of Boba Fett (child)); John Morton (Note: The Empire Strikes Back); Mark Austin (Note: Return of the Jedi 1997 Special Edition); Don Bies/Nelson Hall (Note: Return of the Jedi 1997 Special Edition)
- Voiced by: Various: Don Francks (Note: Star Wars Holiday Special Star Wars: Droids); Jason Wingreen (Note: The Empire Strikes Back (pre-2004)); Temuera Morrison (Note: The Empire Strikes Back (2004 version) Star Wars: Visions Various video games); Daniel Logan (Note: Lego Star Wars: The Skywalker Saga The Clone Wars (series)); Dee Bradley Baker (Note: Various video games); Alan Rosenberg (Note: The Empire Strikes Back radio drama); Ed Begley Jr. (Note: Return of the Jedi radio drama); Neil Ross (Note: Masters of Teräs Käsi); Tom Kane (Note: Various video games); Chris Cox (Note: Star Wars Rogue Squadron III: Rebel Strike); Trevor Devall (Note: Lego Star Wars: Droid Tales)

In-universe information
- Full name: Boba Fett
- Alias: Alpha (clone designation)
- Species: Human (clone)
- Gender: Male
- Title: Daimyo of Mos Espa
- Occupation: Bounty hunter Crime lord
- Affiliation: Various: Bounty Hunters' Guild; Mandalorians; CIS (Note: Confederacy of Independent Systems); Krayt's Claw; Galactic Empire; Hutt Clan; Tusken Raiders
- Family: Jango Fett (clone host, adoptive father); Omega (clone counterpart, sister); Emerie Karr (clone counterpart, sister)
- Relatives: Jaster Mereel (adoptive grandfather)
- Home: Kamino
- Partners: Fennec Shand; Bossk; Dengar; Black Krrsantan

Boba Fett (/ˌboʊbə ˈfɛt, ˌbɒ-/ BO(H)B-ə FET) is a character in the Star Wars franchise. First appearing in the Star Wars Holiday Special (1978), where he was voiced by Don Francks, he is an armored bounty hunter featured in both the original and prequel film trilogies. In the original trilogy, the character is a supporting antagonist and was mainly portrayed by Jeremy Bulloch and voiced by Jason Wingreen. Notable for his taciturn demeanor and for never removing his helmet, Fett appears in both The Empire Strikes Back (1980), employed by the Galactic Empire, and Return of the Jedi (1983), serving the crime lord Jabba the Hutt. While seemingly killed in Return of the Jedi after falling into a sarlacc, he has since appeared in Star Wars media set after the film, confirming his survival. Daniel Logan portrays a preteen Boba in the prequel film Attack of the Clones (2002), which reveals the character's origins as the genetic clone and adoptive son of Jango Fett, a bounty hunter who mentors Boba to follow in his footsteps. The animated series The Bad Batch further reveals Boba to have been born Alpha and to have two biological sisters: Omega and Emerie Karr.

The character also appears in many forms of Star Wars media outside of the films, such as books, comics, television series, and video games, many of which depict him as an antihero rather than a villain, and explore his background, motivations, and morality. Daniel Logan reprised his role as the younger version of Boba Fett in the animated series Star Wars: The Clone Wars, while Temuera Morrison, who portrayed Jango Fett in Attack of the Clones, has portrayed the adult Boba in most of his live-action appearances since that film, most prominently in the live-action Disney+ series The Mandalorian and The Book of Boba Fett. The latter series features Boba as its titular protagonist, following him as he consolidates control over Tatooine as the planet's new daimyo.

During the development of The Empire Strikes Back, Boba Fett was originally conceived as a member of a group of white-armored Imperial "supercommandos" before the idea was scrapped in favor of a solitary bounty hunter. This concept later evolved into the Mandalorians, a cultural group with strong warrior traditions, who sport armor and helmets similar to Fett's. In several Star Wars works, Fett himself is portrayed as a Mandalorian or at least connected to the Mandalorian culture through his armor, inherited from his Mandalorian adoptive father.

The character of Boba Fett quickly became a fan favorite despite his limited screen presence and relevance in the original Star Wars trilogy, and he is now a widely recognized figure in popular culture. His popularity within the Star Wars fanbase has earned him a cult following.

== Concept and development ==
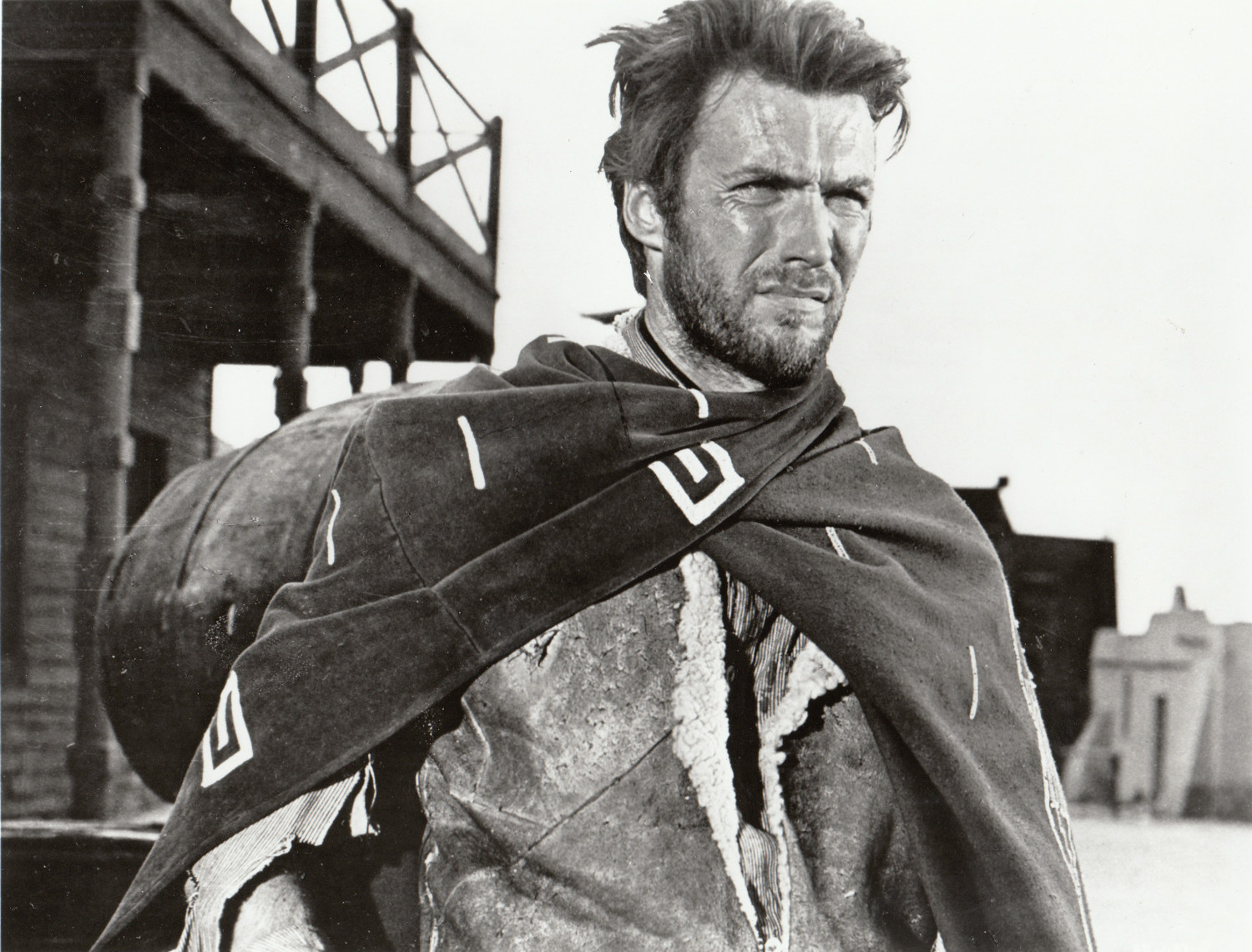
Boba Fett was inspired by the character Man with No Name, portrayed by Clint Eastwood in the Italian Dollar Trilogy, including his mannerisms, taciturn demeanor, and green-on-white armor coloured after the Man's poncho.

Star Wars creator George Lucas created Boba Fett in his April 1978 screenplay draft of The Empire Strikes Back, basing the character on Italian filmmaker Sergio Leone's Man with No Name (Clint Eastwood) from the Dollar Trilogy. The character needed to be designed quickly, as Lucas had agreed for him to be featured in the Star Wars Holiday Special later that year. The character's design stemmed from initial concepts for Darth Vader, who was originally conceived as a rogue bounty hunter. While Vader became less of a mercenary and more of a dark knight, the bounty hunter concept remained, and Fett became "an equally villainous" but "less conspicuous" character. Concept artist Ralph McQuarrie influenced Fett's design, which was finalized by and is credited to Joe Johnston.

Norman Reynolds and the film's art department built the costume. Fett's armor was originally designed for "super troopers", and was adapted for Fett as the script developed. Screen-tested in all-white, Fett's armor eventually garnered a subdued color scheme intended to visually place him between white-armored "rank-and-file" Imperial stormtroopers and Vader, who wears black. This color scheme had the bonus of conveying the "gray morality" of his character. The character's armor was designed to appear to have been scavenged from multiple sources, and it is adorned with trophies. A description of Fett's armor in the mid-1979 Bantha Tracks newsletter catalyzed "rampant speculation" about his origins. By 1979, Fett's backstory included having served in an army of Imperial shock troops which had battled the clone troopers of the Galactic Republic during the Clone Wars.

Despite two years of widespread publicity about Fett's appearance in The Empire Strikes Back, script rewrites significantly reduced the character's presence in the film. Fett's musical theme, composed by John Williams, is "not music, exactly" but "more of a gurgly, viola-and-bassoon thing aurally cross-pollinated with some obscure static sounds." Sound editor Ben Burtt added the sound of jangling spurs, created and performed by the Foley artist team of Robert Rutledge and Edward Steidele, to Fett's appearance in Cloud City, intending to make the character menacing and the scene reminiscent of similar gunfighter appearances in Western films. At one point in Return of the Jedi's development, Fett was conceived as being a main villain, but he was finally replaced with the Emperor when Lucas decided to not make a third trilogy of Star Wars. Lucas also considered having Fett fight Lando Calrissian during the sarlacc sequence.

An official reference book states that Fett charges "famously expensive" fees, and that he undertakes only those missions which meet "his harsh sense of justice". Daniel Keys Moran, who wrote a few stories featuring Boba Fett, cited Westerns as an influence on his development of the character. Moran said:

The difficult thing with Fett was finding a worldview for him that permitted him to proclaim a Code — given the stark Evil that permeated the Empire, Fett pretty much had to be either 1) Evil, or 2) an incredibly unforgiving, harsh, "greater good" sort of guy. The second approach worked and has resonated with some readers.

Lucas at one point considered depicting Vader and Fett as brothers in the prequel films, but discounted it as too "hokey". In continuing to develop the character in the prequel films, Lucas closed some avenues for expanding the character's story while opening others by establishing that Fett is a clone of a similar bounty hunter, Jango Fett. Lucas considered modifying later editions of Return of the Jedi by adding a shot of Fett escaping the sarlacc, but decided against it because it would have detracted from the story's focus. Lucas also said that, had he known Fett would be so popular, he would have made the character's death "more exciting". In 2014, after Lucas had sold Lucasfilm to Disney, Star Wars historian Jonathan W. Rinzler revealed that Lucas had privately acknowledged that Fett escaped from the sarlacc. This was canonically established with Fett's appearances in The Mandalorian six years later portrayed by Temuera Morrison, which led to a spin-off focused on the character, The Book of Boba Fett, starring Morrison. Joe Johnston and Morrison himself criticized the decision to portray the character without his helmet, Morrison noting it was done to avoid comparisons with the titular character of The Mandalorian.

=== Film casting and production ===
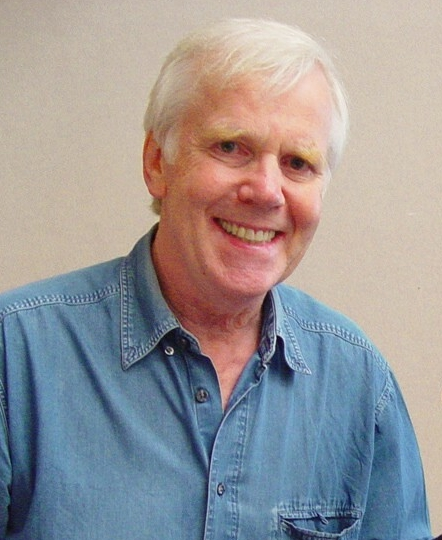
Jeremy Bulloch in 2006

Boba Fett is primarily played by Jeremy Bulloch in The Empire Strikes Back and Return of the Jedi. Bulloch's half-brother alerted him to the role. He was cast as Fett because the costume happened to fit "as if a Savile Row tailor had come out and made it"; he did not have to do a reading or screen test, and Bulloch never worked from a script for either film.

Filming the role for Empire lasted three weeks. The actor was pleased with the costume and used it to convey the character's menace. Bulloch based his performance on Clint Eastwood's portrayal of the Man with No Name in A Fistful of Dollars; similar to the Western character, Bulloch cradled the blaster prop, made the character seem ready to shoot, slightly tilted his head, and stood a particular way. Bulloch did not try to construct a backstory for the character, and said later that "the less you do with Boba Fett, the stronger he becomes". Playing Fett in Empire was both the smallest and most physically uncomfortable role Bulloch has played; Bulloch said donning the heavy jetpack was the worst aspect of the role.

Bulloch spent four weeks on Return of the Jedi. He was unaware of Fett's demise before filming began and was "very upset" by the development; he would like to have done more with Fett. Still, Bulloch believed killing Fett made the character stronger, and that his "weak" death makes fans want the character to return. Bulloch thought a scene created for the 1997 Special Edition in which Fett flirts with one of Jabba the Hutt's dancers was not in keeping with the character's nature.

A younger version of the character was played by Daniel Logan in Attack of the Clones, which establishes that Boba is a clone of his father, Jango. Logan had not seen any of the Star Wars films before being cast as Fett, but he watched the original trilogy at Lucas' request. The actor had to rely on his imagination for the bluescreen filming. Both Bulloch and Logan had also expressed interest in reprising their role of Fett in the planned Underworld TV series, but the series remains undeveloped.

==== Other portrayals ====
According to the official Star Wars website, Fett was voiced by Don Francks in the Holiday Special. (Note: Previously, a Lucasfilm-licensed magazine inaccurately listed Fett's voice as being provided by Gabriel Dell and George Buza in The Empire Strikes Back and Droids, respectively, causing some to speculate that the information was intended for the Holiday Special.) Bulloch wore Fett's costume in Empire and Jedi, but John Morton filled in during one scene for Empire, and Jason Wingreen voiced the character in Empire. His brief appearance in the Special Edition of the original film, Episode IV – A New Hope, was performed by Industrial Light & Magic creature animator Mark Austin. The character's appearance in the Special Edition footage of Jedi was performed by Don Bies and Nelson Hall. For the 2004 rereleases, Temuera Morrison replaced the character's original voice for continuity with Attack of the Clones, in which Morrison portrays Jango Fett.

The character's voice in National Public Radio's Star Wars radio dramas was provided by Alan Rosenberg in The Empire Strikes Back and Ed Begley Jr. in Return of the Jedi. Brian Daley scripted a scene between Fett and C-3PO in Jabba's palace; however, Anthony Daniels rejected the idea insisting the two characters should not be on friendly terms. Fett was replaced by Arica (Mara Jade (Note: Her first appearance was in Timothy Zahn's Legends novel Heir to the Empire (1991)) in disguise) from Timothy Zahn's Tales from Jabba's Palace. His voice was also provided by Tim Glovatsky in the audio adaptation of Dark Forces: Rebel Agent, Joe Hacker in an audio adaptation of the Dark Empire comics, Temuera Morrison for Empire at War, Battlefront II and Battlefront: Elite Squadron, Dee Bradley Baker in The Force Unleashed, The Force Unleashed II and Star Tours: The Adventures Continue, Chris Cox in Rogue Squadron III: Rebel Strike, Tom Kane in Galactic Battlegrounds, Demolition and Jedi Knight: Jedi Academy, and Daniel Logan for The Clone Wars animated TV series and Lego Star Wars: The Video Game.

The first live-action depiction of Fett outside the theatrical films was in the second season of the original Disney+ series The Mandalorian, wherein Morrison reprised the role.

The character (portrayed by Bulloch again) also made a cameo appearance in a live-action mockumentary filmed on the set of Return of the Jedi titled Return of the Ewok (1982). Post-production was never completed, and it has never been officially released.

== Appearances ==
The character of Boba Fett made his first public appearance at the San Anselmo Country Fair parade on 24 September 1978. In the parade, the Boba Fett costume was worn by Duwayne Dunham, who was working at the time as an assistant film editor before later becoming a film and television director. The character debuted on television two months later in an animated segment produced by Toronto-based animation firm Nelvana Productions for the Star Wars Holiday Special. Fett appears as a mysterious figure who saves Luke Skywalker, Chewbacca, C-3PO, and R2-D2 from a giant monster, only to be revealed as a bounty hunter working for Darth Vader. After his image and identity were revealed in the Holiday Special, costumed Fett characters appeared in shopping malls and special events, putting up wanted posters of the character to distinguish him from the franchise's Imperial characters.

=== Skywalker saga ===
==== Original trilogy ====
Fett's theatrical film debut was as an unnamed bounty hunter in The Empire Strikes Back as the "next major villain" beside Darth Vader. He is one of six bounty hunters assembled by Darth Vader, who promises a reward to whoever captures the crew of the Millennium Falcon. Fett tracks the starship to Cloud City, where Vader captures its passengers and tortures its captain, Han Solo. Aiming to collect the bounty Jabba the Hutt has placed on Solo (established in the original film), Fett questions Vader regarding the carbon freeze, which Vader intends to use on his true target, Luke Skywalker. Vader promises that the Empire will compensate Fett if Solo dies, but the smuggler survives and Vader turns him over to Fett, who leaves to deliver him to Jabba in his ship, the Slave I.

Return of the Jedi features Boba Fett at Jabba's palace on Tatooine, where Han Solo's friends are captured while trying to save him. Fett aims his weapon at Princess Leia (disguised as bounty hunter Boushh) when she threatens Jabba with a thermal detonator, and he later travels on Jabba's sail barge to the Great Pit of Carkoon (home of a sessile carnivorous creature known as a sarlacc) to witness the prisoners' execution. When the prisoners revolt and fight back, Fett flies over and briefly fights Luke. Chewbacca later warns Solo, who is still blind after being frozen in carbonite, that Fett is near. As Solo turns around, he inadvertently hits Fett's rocket pack, setting it off and propelling Fett into the side of the sail barge, from which he falls into the sarlacc's mouth. The 1997 Special Edition release of the film includes an additional scene of Fett flirting with some of Jabba's female dancers.

In the 1997 Special Edition of A New Hope, Fett briefly appears in a reintroduced cut scene outside the Millennium Falcon while Jabba confronts Han Solo. The character had yet to be created during the filming of the scene and was thus superimposed onto the image.

==== Prequel trilogy ====
Boba Fett, as portrayed by Daniel Logan in Attack of the Clones

A preteen Boba Fett (played by Daniel Logan) appears in the 2002 prequel film Episode II – Attack of the Clones, which reveals that he is an unaltered clone of the bounty hunter Jango Fett (Temuera Morrison), who had him created on Kamino to be raised as his son as part of his price to serve as the template for the Grand Army of the Republic's clone army. Boba helps Jango escape from Obi-Wan Kenobi and accompanies him to Geonosis, where he witnesses Jango's death by beheading at the hands of Mace Windu during the first battle in the Clone Wars. After the battle ends, he is last seen mourning over his father's helmet, which he takes and places in front of his head, foreshadowing his future as a bounty hunter wearing his father's armor.

George Lucas originally planned for Boba to appear in the 2005 film Episode III – Revenge of the Sith, with Logan reprising his role, in which Boba would have avenged his father's death by killing Mace Windu. However, Windu's actor Samuel L. Jackson opposed the idea that a young child could kill a member of the Jedi Council, so Boba was written out of the film.

=== Television ===
==== The Story of the Faithful Wookiee ====
Boba Fett appeared in the animated segment of the non-canon 1978 Holiday Special, set after the events of A New Hope. This marks his first appearance in the franchise. He is first seen when he rescues Luke Skywalker, C-3PO, and R2-D2 from a Panna dragon. Fett presents himself as an ally to the heroes but it is later revealed that he was working for Darth Vader the whole time - to reveal the location of the Rebels to the Empire. Fett ignites his jetpack before leaving and promising that they will meet again.

==== Droids ====
Boba Fett appeared in the non-canon 1985 animated series, Star Wars: Droids, set 15 years before the original trilogy. The series was produced by the same studio that created the animated segment of the 1978 Holiday Special, and Fett was again voiced by Don Francks (who had been uncredited for his original role in the Holiday Special). In the episode "A Race to the Finish", he is hired by the Fromms to help them get revenge on the masters of the droids R2-D2 and C-3PO. Fett later turns on them after failing their request, and decides to accept Jabba's bounty on the Fromms as compensation.

==== The Clone Wars ====
Logan reprised his role as the voice of Fett in the 2008 animated series The Clone Wars. The final three episodes of the second season of the series, entitled "Death Trap", "R2 Come Home" and "Lethal Trackdown", were aired on April 30, 2010, and attracted an average of 2.756 million viewers during the original broadcast. The finale is significant for ending "with twin fandom bangs, courtesy of Boba Fett and a mammoth beast inspired by Godzilla". Fett's entrance in the series commemorates the 30-year anniversary of the character's appearance in The Empire Strikes Back.

In the story arc, Boba infiltrates Mace Windu's flagship in the guise of a clone trooper cadet, hoping to exact revenge against the Jedi for killing his father. After a failed attempt to bomb Windu in his quarters, he sabotages the ship's engines, causing it to crash on a nearby planet. He and his bounty hunter accomplices then take hostages from the ship's crew, whom they try to use to bait the Jedi Master. Throughout the ordeal, Fett balks at committing violence against his fellow clones, which comes to a head when his mentor Aurra Sing executes Windu's clone trooper second-in-command. Plo Koon and Ahsoka Tano eventually track Fett and his compatriots to pirate Hondo Ohnaka's base. Fett is ultimately captured by the Jedi and sentenced to prison on Coruscant; although he expresses regret for the collateral damage he has caused, he vows to never forgive Windu.

Fett escapes prison in the fourth-season episode "Deception". He later forms his bounty hunter syndicate, Krayt's Claw, which includes Bossk and Dengar (both of whom first appeared in The Empire Strikes Back alongside Fett). In the episode "Bounty", Krayt's Claw is hired to deliver a package to a dictator. When the bounty hunters discover that their cargo is a young woman destined for a forced marriage to the despot, Fett is indifferent to her plight and insists the team proceed with their mission. Temporary member Asajj Ventress, enraged, turns on Fett; she strangles him with the Force, binds, and gags him, and shoves him into the container in the captive's place, whereupon he is delivered to the nonplussed client.

==== The Mandalorian ====
Boba Fett's presence in the original Disney+ series The Mandalorian was first hinted at in the first-season episode "Chapter 5: The Gunslinger", which ends with a mysterious figure wearing boots and seemingly a cape approaching the body of assassin Fennec Shand on Tatooine.

Temuera Morrison as Boba Fett in the episode "Chapter 15: The Believer" from The Mandalorian

In June 2020, it was reported that Temuera Morrison would appear as Fett in the second season of The Mandalorian. As the series takes place five years following Return of the Jedi, this would confirm the character's survival after his fall into the sarlacc's mouth and retcon his apparent death. In the second season's premiere, "Chapter 9: The Marshal", it is explained that Fett's armor was salvaged by Jawas after his supposed death, and then bought by Cobb Vanth, a character first introduced in the Star Wars: Aftermath trilogy of novels, who used it to protect the Tatooinian village of Mos Pelgo from various threats. In the episode, the armor is eventually obtained by the Mandalorian after Vanth relinquishes it so that it could be returned to its rightful owners: the Mandalorian people. As he leaves with the armor, the Mandalorian is watched from the distance by a heavily scarred Fett.

Fett's first full appearance in the series occurred in the episode "Chapter 14: The Tragedy", in which it is explained that he saved Fennec's life after she was mortally wounded, leaving her in his debt and that he is looking to retrieve his armor from the Mandalorian. Fett and Fennec follow him in the Slave I to the planet Tython, where the former explains that his armor belonged to his late father Jango, a Mandalorian foundling, and is, thus, Fett's birthright. In exchange for the armor's return, Fett and Fennec ensure the safety of Grogu, an alien infant the Mandalorian has adopted. When Moff Gideon's Imperial forces attack the group, Fett dons his old armor and kills most of the stormtroopers deployed to capture Grogu with a gaffi stick. Despite this, the child is ultimately taken by Gideon's Dark Troopers. Fett insists that he and Fennec shall remain indebted to the Mandalorian until Grogu is safe, and they subsequently aid his efforts to rescue the child in "Chapter 15: The Believer" and ''Chapter 16: The Rescue'', which show Fett in a now clean and repainted armor.

In the latter episode, Fett is initially at odds with Bo-Katan Kryze, the former ruler of Mandalore and one of the allies that the Mandalorian tries to recruit to help save Grogu because she calls him a disgrace to his Mandalorian armor due to his origins as a clone. Despite this, the two reluctantly work together to rescue the child from Moff Gideon, with Fett creating a distraction that allows the rest of the crew to board Gideon's ship. After this, Fett flies into hyperspace and is not seen again until a post-credits scene, in which he and Fennec return to Tatooine after their debt is paid off. Fett kills Bib Fortuna, who has been in charge of Jabba's palace since his death, and then sits on the throne that once belonged to Jabba, with Fennec at his side.

==== The Bad Batch ====
Boba Fett is mentioned in Star Wars: The Bad Batch, a CGI-animated sequel and spin-off from The Clone Wars which premiered in 2021. The episode "Bounty Lost" reveals that Boba's original code name is Alpha, and that Omega, an enhanced female clone who joined Clone Force 99 after the rise of the Empire, is a second unaltered replication of Jango and, therefore, Boba's sister. The episode "Plan 99" reveals that Emerie Karr is another female clone, therefore, another sister of his.

==== Visions ====
Boba Fett appears in the 2021 anime series Star Wars: Visions, voiced by Temuera Morrison in English and by Akio Kaneda in Japanese. He appears in the second episode, "Tatooine Rhapsody".

==== The Book of Boba Fett ====
The Book of Boba Fett is a spin-off of The Mandalorian focused on Boba Fett, which premiered on Disney+ on December 29, 2021. Morrison and Ming-Na Wen reprised their roles as Fett and Fennec Shand, respectively, with Finnegan Garay portraying a young Fett with Daniel Logan's likeness superimposed over his own. The first trailer was released November 1, 2021. In The Book of Boba Fett, Boba Fett and his partner, Fennec Shand, begin rebuilding the old criminal empire of Jabba the Hutt on Tatooine. The series was controversial among Star Wars fans for its weakening of the villainous aspects of the bounty hunter.

=== Other media ===
In the first issue of Marvel Comics' Darth Vader (2015), the title character hires Boba Fett to capture the pilot who destroyed the Death Star. In the concurrent Star Wars comic (2015), Fett tracks the pilot, Luke Skywalker, to Tatooine, although the latter escapes after a brief fight. Fett then tells Vader the pilot's surname, unknowingly informing the Sith lord (formerly Anakin Skywalker) that he has a son. Fett also features in Marvel's Bounty Hunters (2020), which is set between The Empire Strikes Back and Return of the Jedi. The comic miniseries War of the Bounty Hunters (2021) is set in the same era, and will be preceded by standalone comics including tie-ins with Star Wars, Bounty Hunters, Darth Vader, and Doctor Aphra.

Fett appears as a playable character in Star Wars Battlefront (2015) and Star Wars Battlefront II (2017), as well as several Star Wars video games for mobile devices.

On December 24, 2021, Fett was added as a wearable cosmetic for Fortnite Battle Royale.

On February 4, 2022, Indy Stevenson posted a The Book of Boba Fett comic entitled "This Place Was Home" on Twitter to a universally positive critical reception. The comic focused on "Boba's childhood relationship with [Zam] Wesell", a mother figure to him.

Fett makes a cameo appearance in Star Wars Jedi: Survivor (2023), with Temuera Morrison reprising his role. He appears as part of a side quest in which Cal Kestis fights and defeats bounty hunter Caij Vanda. Fett appears at the end of the fight to collect the bounty on Vanda, with Cal allowing it to happen.

=== Legends ===
The character appears extensively in the Star Wars Expanded Universe of novels, comic books, and video games, dating to as early as the newspaper comic strip and Marvel's Star Wars series (produced concurrently to the original film trilogy). In April 2014, such works were rebranded by Lucasfilm as Star Wars Legends and declared non-canon to the rest of the franchise to create a blank slate for the sequel trilogy.

Boba Fett appears in many other works set during the original trilogy, including the choose-your-own-adventure book The Bounty Hunter (1994), the 1996 Shadows of the Empire multimedia project, Dark Horse's short comic Boba Fett: Salvage (1997), (Note: Originally printed in Wizard magazine and later collected in the Enemy of the Empire trade paperback as Boba Fett #0.5) volumes of the young-reader series Galaxy of Fear (1997–1998), The Bounty Hunter Wars book trilogy (1998–1999), issues of Empire (2002–2005) and Star Wars (2013–14), and the one-shot comic Boba Fett: Overkill (2006). Fett appears in the years leading up to A New Hope in the comic Boba Fett: Enemy of the Empire (1999), in which Vader hires Fett before trying to kill him, as well as Agent of the Empire (2012–2013), Blood Ties (2010–2012), and Underworld: The Yavin Vassilika (2000–2001).

A 1983 issue of the original Marvel Star Wars comic book set just after Return of the Jedi depicts Fett temporarily escaping the sarlacc pit. Works such as Dark Horse's Dark Empire series (1991–1992) further utilized Fett's survival. A 1995 anthology story by Daniel Keys Moran narrates some of his time in the sarlacc, and a 1996 story by Dave Wolverton narrates how Dengar finds him and restores him to health. In the comic Boba Fett: Twin Engines of Destruction (1997), (Note: Originally published in Topps's Star Wars Galaxy quarterly magazine) while Fett recovers after being freed from the sarlaac, he is impersonated by a bounty hunter named Jodo Kast, whom Fett then hunts. (Note: Kast was previously introduced in a 1988 adventure book for Star Wars: The Roleplaying Game. In the last story of the Tales from the Empire anthology (1997), which features Fett on the cover, Grand Admiral Thrawn impersonates Kast.) Four Boba Fett comics set several years after Return of the Jedi were released between 1995 and 2000. (Note: These have art by Cam Kennedy (of Dark Empire fame) and are individually titled Bounty on Bar-Kooda (1995), When the Fat Lady Swings (1996), Murder Most Foul (1997), and Agent of Doom (2000). The first three, written by John Wagner and telling an interconnected story dealing with the Hutts, were collected in the trade paperback Boba Fett: Death, Lies, & Treachery (1998).) Fett encounters Han Solo in the short story The Last One Standing: The Tale of Boba Fett (1996), set 15 years after the events of the same film, and fights side by side with him in The New Jedi Order: The Unifying Force (2003), set a decade later. He also appears in the e-novella Boba Fett: A Practical Man, set 20 years after Jedi. In the Legacy of the Force series (2006–2008), set some 35 years after Jedi, Han and Leia's daughter, Jaina, asks Fett to train her to help her defeat her corrupted brother, Jacen. (Note: The series reveals that Fett became a family man at one point, though he was forcibly separated from his wife after killing his commanding officer for assaulting her. His wife subsequently disappeared and was presumed dead. Their granddaughter later sought Boba out and married a Mandalorian warrior. Boba's wife was discovered to still be alive, having been frozen in carbonite decades earlier.)

In The Last One Standing, Daniel Keys Moran developed a backstory for Fett in which he was once named Jaster Mereel, a "Journeyman Protector" lawman who was convicted of treason. His backstory was depicted differently in Attack of the Clones, leading to the Dark Horse comic Jango Fett: Open Seasons (2003) retconning Mereel to Jango's mentor. (Note: This was apparently canonized by the season-two episode of The Mandalorian, "Chapter 14: The Tragedy", in which a hologram (when translated to English) implies that the name of Jango's mentor contains the letters "Jaste".) A young-adult book series called Boba Fett (2002–2004) depicts Fett's roots as a bounty hunter during the Clone Wars. He is guided by a book left to him by his father, whose ship and armor he has inherited, and begins working for Jabba the Hutt.

==== The Bounty Hunter Wars ====
The Bounty Hunter Wars is a trilogy of novels by K. W. Jeter set during the events of the original trilogy. The books were published by Bantam Spectra in July 1998, November 1998, and July 1999, respectively. The trilogy depicts Fett as being more communicative than in the films because its plot requires Fett to show "an ability to convince people as well as kill them".

The first book, The Mandalorian Armor, starts during the events of Return of the Jedi, shortly after Jabba's sail barge is destroyed. Dengar stays with Fett after the latter's near-death experience and encounters Neelah, a dancer in Jabba's palace who has lost her memory, and thinks Fett can help her. Kuat of Kuat, an Imperial executive, reviews footage from the Great Pit of Carkoon, leading him to suspect that Fett is still alive. It is related in flashbacks set between A New Hope and The Empire Strikes Back that Fett stole a bounty Bossk and Zuckuss was hunting on behalf of the Bounty Hunters' Guild. After delivering the bounty, Fett accepted a contract to join the Bounty Hunters Guild to break it up. The Emperor met with Darth Vader and Prince Xizor, where the latter revealed that it was he who planned for Fett to join the guild to eliminate its weakest members, leaving only the best for the Empire to exploit.

In the second book, Slave Ship, Fett abandons Slave I to avoid dispelling rumors of his death, and instead steals Bossk's ship. Riding along, Dengar tells Neelah about the split of the Bounty Hunters Guild. After Bossk killed his father, the guild split into two factions: one composed of the older members, and another composed of Bossk and other younger members. Prince Xizor placed an enormous bounty on a renegade stormtrooper who slaughtered his entire ship's crew. Fett, Bossk, and Zuckuss captured the trooper, but Fett jettisoned his partners in an escape pod.

In the third and final book, Hard Merchandise, it is related that Fett tried to claim his bounty, but found Xizor waiting to kill him to tie up loose ends related to his plot. In an attack on the megalomaniacal prince, Kuat of Kuat had falsified some evidence implicating him in the murder of Luke Skywalker's aunt and uncle. This information was on the renegade stormtrooper's ship (which is why Kuat wanted to make sure the bounty hunter was dead) but is retrieved by Fett in the present, as Neelah realizes she is from an elite Kuat family and stops her sinister sister from taking over the now-suicidal Imperial executive's shipyard.

==== Boba Fett: A Practical Man ====
Boba Fett: A Practical Man is an e-novella by Karen Traviss, which was published online in August 2006 by Del Rey Books. Set 20 years after the events of Return of the Jedi, it focuses on what led Boba Fett and the Mandalorians to fend off the extragalactic Yuuzhan Vong invaders in The New Jedi Order: The Unifying Force (set a few months later). A Yuuzhan Vong named Nom Anor meets Fett on Mandalore and begins giving him and the Mandalorians directions to help their invasion. Fett plans to do as much damage to the invaders as possible, even as he pretends to help them. He instructs a pilot to deliver his plea for help to the New Republic, but with the Vong's next target still unwarned, the world falls without a fight. A Vong warrior asks Fett to assist in killing a Jedi; instead, Fett convinces the Jedi to deliver his message. The Jedi returns and confirms that Fett has a deal: the Mandalorians will continue to masquerade as Vong mercenaries while passing intel to the Republic. Fett agrees to have a few of his best commandos train planetary militias to fight the Vong.

=== Unproduced works ===
A planned live-action TV series developed by Star Wars creator George Lucas before the sale of Lucasfilm to Disney, under the working title Star Wars: Underworld, would have featured Fett.

==== Star Wars 1313 ====
The canceled LucasArts video game Star Wars 1313, announced at E3 2012, would have told the story of Boba Fett's career as a young adult bounty hunter between the prequel and original trilogies. Fett would have navigated past the scum of civilization in an underground area of Coruscant known as Level 1313. In 2013, as a result of Disney's acquisition of the franchise, all LucasArts projects then in production were shelved. In a December 2015 interview, Lucasfilm president Kathleen Kennedy stated that the concept art for the game was "unbelievable" and that, along with Underworld, it was "something we're spending a lot of time looking at, poring through, discussing, and we may very well develop those things further".

Level 1313 appears in Star Wars media such as The Clone Wars, in which it is visited by Ahsoka Tano, and Star Wars Adventures: Return to Vader's Castle.

==== The Clone Wars episodes ====
Fett was to have appeared in more episodes of The Clone Wars before its cancellation. A series of Western-inspired episodes would have featured Fett teaming up with Cad Bane to rescue a child kidnapped by Tusken Raiders on Tatooine; Aurra Sing would have appeared as well. The story arc would have depicted Fett donning his Mandalorian armor for the first time, and ended with Bane blasting Fett in the head, creating the iconic dent in his helmet (an idea which came from George Lucas). Animatic footage of the climactic scene was shown at Star Wars Celebration.

==== Standalone film ====
In early 2013, Disney CEO Bob Iger announced the development of a Star Wars spin-off film written by Simon Kinberg, which Entertainment Weekly reported would focus on Boba Fett during the original trilogy. In mid-2014, Josh Trank was officially announced as the director of an undisclosed spin-off film, but had left the project a year later due to creative differences with Kinberg, (Note: According to Trank, he quit the project because he thought he would be fired in the wake of problems he had had working on his Fantastic Four film.) causing a teaser for the Fett film to be scrapped from Star Wars Celebration. In May 2018, it was reported that James Mangold had signed on to write and direct a Fett film, with Kinberg attached as producer and co-writer, but both Mangold and Kathleen Kennedy subsequently denied Mangold's involvement. In July, Daniel Keys Moran stated that Lucasfilm had considered adapting The Last One Standing into a film. By October, the Fett film was reportedly dead, with the studio instead focusing on The Mandalorian. The Fett film was afterwards reported to have also featured the other bounty hunters (Dengar, Bossk, IG-88, Zuckuss, and 4-LOM) from The Empire Strikes Back.

== Reception ==
Boba Fett is a "cult figure" and one of the most popular Star Wars characters. In 2008, Boba Fett was selected by Empire magazine as the 79th greatest movie character of all time, and he is included on Fandomania's list of The 100 Greatest Fictional Characters. IGN ranked Boba Fett as the eighth top Star Wars character, due to his status as a fan-favourite and cult following. He personifies "danger and mystery", and Susan Mayse calls Fett "the unknowable Star Wars character" who "delivers mythic presence." Although Tom Bissell asserts that no one knows why Boba Fett has become so popular, nor cares why, both Lucas and Bulloch cite Fett's mysterious nature as reasons for his popularity. Bulloch, who has never fully understood the character's popularity, attributes it to the costume and the respect Fett garners from Darth Vader and Jabba the Hutt. Fett's addition to the Special Edition of A New Hope was criticized by Screen Rant, which called it "pointless fan service".

The initial Boba Fett toy, more than Fett's actual film appearance, might be responsible for the character's popularity; Henry Jenkins suggests children's play helped the character "take on a life of its own". Moran said Vader's admonition specifically to Fett in The Empire Strikes Back—"No disintegrations"—gives Fett credibility; he was interested in Fett because the character is "strong, silent, [and] brutal". Jeter says that even when Fett appears passive, he conveys "capability and ruthlessness". Bissell credits Bulloch for giving Fett "effortless authority" in his first scene in The Empire Strikes Back, using such nuances as cradling his blaster and slightly cocking his head. Fett's small role in the film may have made the character seem more intriguing. Logan, who was a Young Artist Award nominee for his portrayal of Fett, compares Fett to "that boy in school who never talks" and who attracts others' curiosity.

Bissell adds that Boba Fett, along with other minor characters like Darth Maul and Kyle Katarn, appeals to adolescent boys' "images of themselves: essentially bad-ass but ... honorable about it." This tension and the absence of a clear "evil nature" (distinct from evil actions) offer Fett dramatic appeal. Furthermore, Fett "is cool because he was designed to be cool", presenting a "wicked ambiguity" akin to John Milton's portrayal of Satan in Paradise Lost and Iago in William Shakespeare's Othello. Bissell compares Fett to Beowulf, Ahab, and Huckleberry Finn: characters "too big" for their original presentation, and apt for continued development in other stories. Moran finds Fett reminiscent of the Man with No Name.

Fett has been featured extensively in pop culture and parodies. Breckin Meyer provides his voice in various Robot Chicken sketches. Nerdcore rapper MC Chris included a Star Wars-themed song titled "Fett's Vette" on his 2001 debut album. The creator of the Spartan helmets for the 2006 film 300 painted one of them to look like Fett's helmet. The San Francisco Chronicle describes Boba Fett fans as "among the most passionate", and the character is important to Star Wars fan culture. Boba Fett's popular following before the character even appeared in The Empire Strikes Back influenced Damon Lindelof's interest in developing Lost across multiple media. Between filming The Empire Strikes Back and Return of the Jedi, Mark Hamill pitched the idea that Fett was Luke Skywalker's mother to George Lucas, which "he didn't like". In about 2000, a feminist campaigned online to have the character unmasked as a woman. Fan parodies include Boba Phat, a cosplay "intergalactic booty hunter" created by David James.

=== In The Clone Wars ===
In Episode II, [Boba Fett] saw his father murdered by Mace Windu, however, he's still got a long way to go before he becomes the battered bounty hunter we know so well. Aurra's an influence, and not much of a nurturing parental figure – so that plays a part, as well. She preys on his weakness, on his desire for a family. It's pretty dysfunctional, and it sheds an interesting light on both Aurra and Boba. Ultimately, though, Boba's always been a mystery. As much as we reveal, we're not going to take the mystery away from his fans. Not knowing all the answers about Boba is part of what makes him so cool.

— Dave Filoni, supervising director for The Clone Wars TV series

IGN reviewer Eric Goldman rated the first episode 8.2/10 and the second 8.8/10, stating "this was a very layered, exciting episode to end Season 2 on", though he did not appreciate Boba Fett's limited dialogue. Bryan Young, a writer for The Huffington Post and Examiner.com, also disliked Fett's responses at the end of the episode when confronting Mace Windu: "He says something incredibly whiny." Young does state, however, that "[o]verall, this pair of episodes was a satisfying conclusion to season two, which really upped the game in this series in terms of animation, storytelling, and suspense." GalacticBinder.com's reviewer Chris Smith wrote, "Lucasfilm delivers another exciting episode to finish off a tremendous second season." Adam Rosenberg writing in MTV Movies Blog discusses Boba Fett's return: "He's going to have to be put through a lot more hell before he embraces his inner badass. I'll say though... he's off to a mighty good start with the dual blasters he wears on his belt. Sure, they're almost the size of his thighs, but hey... he's still just a kid."

=== In The Book of Boba Fett ===
Boba Fett's character in the series has received mixed reviews, while Morrison's portrayal of Fett has been praised. Some have said that, without Morrison portraying Boba Fett, the series might have been a total disaster and that he is the only face that could have brought Fett back to life. Decider's Megan O'Keefe wrote, "Boba Fett is the least interesting character in The Book of Boba Fett." Rich Knight from CinemaBlend stated that he used to not like Fett, but became interested in his character as he was the only one in the series who "seems like an actual human being". Chris Edwards of The Guardian said that Disney+ ruined one of the "coolest and most mysterious characters" in Star Wars.

=== Merchandising ===
Fett is one of the top five best-selling Star Wars action figures, and Boba Fett-related products are "among the most expensive" Star Wars merchandise. Fett was the first new mail-away action figure created for The Empire Strikes Back; although advertised as having a rocket-firing backpack, safety concerns led Kenner to sell his rocket attached. Gray called the early toy "a rare and precious commodity", and one of the rocket-firing prototypes sold at auction for $16,000 in 2003. In 2018 and 2019, two of the prototypes were sold at auction, for £69,000 ($USD92,000) and £90,000 ($USD120,000), respectively—each setting the world record for the highest auction price of a Star Wars toy at that time. A fully painted figure with a rare variant on the firing mechanism is planned to be auctioned and estimated to be worth $200,000. In 2024, one of the only two existing hand painted missile firing bounty hunter Boba Fett action figures was sold for record breaking $525,000 at Heritage Auctions.

In August 2009, Hasbro released a Fett action figure based on McQuarrie's white-armored concept, and Boba Fett as both a child and bounty hunter have been made into Lego minifigures and a helmet statue of Fett in his armor. Wizards of the Coast's Star Wars Trading Card Game includes several Boba Fett cards. Hallmark Cards created a Boba Fett Christmas tree ornament. In January 2015, an unopened Boba Fett figure sold for £18,000 at auction in the UK, the figure was in factory-fresh condition and did not have the packaging punched for hanging in a shop.

In mid-2021, Lego released a Slave I set, replacing the ship's name with "Boba Fett's Starship". According to the design director of Lego Star Wars, the Slave I name "is just something that Disney doesn't want to use anymore". This prompted some backlash from fans, including Mark Austin, who portrays Fett in the Special Edition of A New Hope. While the ship was not canonically renamed, Disney is likely merely avoiding slavery-related terms in merchandise. In a press release for variant covers for Marvel's War of the Bounty Hunters, the ship is referred to as "Firespray", a reference to the ship's fictional class.

== See also ==
- Space Western

== Print sources ==
- Barr, Patricia; Bray, Adam; Wallace, Daniel; Windham, Ryder (2015). Ultimate Star Wars. London: Dorling Kindersley. ISBN 9781465436016.
- Bouzereau, Laurent (1997). Star Wars: The Annotated Screenplays. Ballantine Books. ISBN 0345409817.
- Daniels, Anthony (2019). I Am C-3PO: The Inside Story (Hardback ed.). London: DK. ISBN 9780241357606.
- Hidalgo, Pablo (2012). Star Wars: The Essential Reader's Companion. Del Rey Books. ISBN 9780345511195.
- Magazines, Titan (2021). Star Wars: Episode V: The Empire Strikes Back: The 40th Anniversary Special Edition (Hardback ed.). London: Titan Magazines. ISBN 9781787734234.
- Reynolds, David West; Luceno, James; Windham, Ryder (2006). Star Wars: The Complete Visual Dictionary — The Ultimate Guide to Characters and Creatures from the Entire Star Wars Saga. DK Children. ISBN 9780756622381.
- Slavicsek, Bill (1994). A Guide to the Star Wars Universe (Rev. and expanded ed.). Ballantine Books. ISBN 9780345386250.
- Wilkins, Jonathan, ed. (2019). Star Wars: Aliens, Creatures and Droids (Paperback) (1st ed.). London: Titan. ISBN 9781785851964.
- Windham, Ryder (2007). Star Wars The Ultimate Visual Guide: Special Edition (Hardback ed.). London: Dorling Kindersley. ISBN 9781405318686.
- Windham, Ryder; Wallace, Daniel; Hidalgo, Pablo (2011). Star Wars Year by Year: A Visual Chronicle (Hardback ed.). London: DK. ISBN 9781405392303.
