= Tales of the Bounty Hunters =

1996 anthology edited by Kevin J. Anderson

- Editor: Kevin J. Anderson
- Author: Kevin J. Anderson; Dave Wolverton; Kathy Tyers; M. Shayne Bell; Daniel Keys Moran
- Cover artist: Stephen Youll
- Language: English
- Subject: Star Wars
- Genre: Science fiction
- Publisher: Bantam Spectra
- Publication date: December 3, 1996
- Publication place: United States
- Media type: Paperback
- Pages: 400
- ISBN: 0-553-56816-7

Tales of the Bounty Hunters (1996) is an anthology of short stories set in the fictional Star Wars universe. It presents the background stories about each bounty hunter that was seen aboard Darth Vader's Star Destroyer in the film The Empire Strikes Back. It contains the tales of IG-88, Dengar, Bossk, Zuckuss and 4-LOM, and Boba Fett.

The book was edited by Kevin J. Anderson, who conceived the Tales book series, and wrote one of the stories as well.

== Contents ==
=== Therefore I Am: The Tale of IG-88 ===
Written by the editor, Kevin J. Anderson, the story of assassin android IG-88 and his three brothers is told from their perspectives, which are automatically shared with one another. When the Imperial engineers realize the droid is sentient, they attempt to shut it down, which triggers a defense mechanism. IG-88 kills everyone in the production plant, and goes on the run in an attempt to free other droids in his product line. Two of the four are dismantled by Boba Fett shortly after Darth Vader places a bounty on Han Solo. The original droid is revealed to be uploaded to the second Death Star, where he plays tricks on the Emperor.

The title is a reference to Enlightenment philosopher's René Descartes "I think, therefore I am." An IG-88 model whose fate is left unknown is killed by Dash Rendar in the video game Shadows of the Empire (1996).

=== Payback: The Tale of Dengar ===
The story of Dengar was written by Dave Wolverton. He is revealed to have gained his injuries in a swoop bike race against Han Solo on their shared home planet of Corellia. Shortly before the events of The Empire Strikes Back, Dengar works as an assassin and falls in love with the dancer Manaroo. He pursues Solo to take his revenge, and is captured by the Empire upon Hoth. Vader lets him live with the understanding that he is to capture Solo and his friends alive. He competes with Boba Fett, who spares no punches, to take his bounty.

When Manaroo is taken captive on Cloud City, he shoots stormtroopers to free her. He learns to communicate with her psychically and travels to her homeworld to rescue some of her people from Imperial oppression. On Tatooine, Dengar sees Han Solo frozen in carbonite and considers killing Jabba the Hutt. Boba Fett deduces his plans, and binds him to the desert floor, where he witnesses the Millennium Falcon depart. Reaching out with his feelings, he is able to contact Manaroo, who comes to free him. Together, they save the naked Boba Fett, whose armor was destroyed by a thermal detonator he used to free himself from the sarlacc.

=== The Prize Pelt: The Tale of Bossk ===
The story of Bossk is told by Kathy Tyers. Through the perspective of human female Tinian and her Wookiee mentor Chen, who join Bossk in a hunt for Chewbacca, who is attempting to capture the bounty on Han Solo. Bossk attempts to double-cross his companions, who use a thumb-sized robot to subvert his ship's computer.

=== Of Possible Futures: The Tale of Zuckuss and 4-LOM ===
The tale of the duo Zuckuss and 4-LOM was written by M. Shayne Bell. Zuckuss, who is able to intuit possible futures, meditates shortly before the bounty hunter scene in The Empire Strikes Back, and the duo encounters survivors from the Battle of Hoth.

=== The Last One Standing: The Tale of Boba Fett ===
The story of the most famous Star Wars bounty hunter, Boba Fett, is told by Daniel Keys Moran. A prologue set 15 years before The Empire Strikes Back explores Fett's history with Han Solo. Then, just before the events of Empire, Fett tracks Solo to the Rebel base on Hoth to obtain the bounty from Jabba the Hutt, encountering his previous employer, Darth Vader. On Tatooine, Jabba sends the enslaved Princess Leia to Fett's quarters, where they converse platonically. The majority of the story takes place 15 years after Return of the Jedi, when Fett fell into the sarlacc; his escape was dealt with in another short story by the author subtitled The Tale of Boba Fett. Finally, the older Fett takes one last bounty hunting job to pay for his retirement, and encounters his former nemesis Han Solo. The story ends in a cliffhanger of Fett and Solo in a standoff, with rifles pointed at each other.

A backstory is given for Fett as lawman Jaster Mereel, though this was superseded by the plot of Attack of the Clones (2002). The comic Jango Fett: Open Seasons retconned Mereel as the mentor of Boba's father, Jango, and only a name used by Boba as an alias. A season-two episode of The Mandalorian appears to canonically confirm that the name of Jango Fett's mentor contains the letters "Jaste".

Moran stated in mid-2018 that Disney and Lucasfilm had considered adapting his story into a standalone movie, but did not know how the project was faring after the poor financial performance of Solo: A Star Wars Story. In late 2018, it was reported to have been cancelled in favor of The Mandalorian, and to have featured the entire lineup of bounty hunters from The Empire Strikes Back.

== See also ==
- Tales from the Mos Eisley Cantina
- Tales from Jabba's Palace
- Tales from the Empire
- Tales from the New Republic
