= Tales from the Mos Eisley Cantina =

1995 Star Wars short story anthology

- Editor: Kevin J. Anderson
- Author: Tom Veitch; Martha Veitch; Daniel Keys Moran; Barbara Hambly; Ann C. Crispin; Dave Wolverton; Kathy Tyers; M. Shayne Bell
- Cover artist: Stephen Youll
- Language: English
- Series: Legend C
- Subject: Star Wars
- Genre: Science fiction
- Publisher: Bantam Spectra
- Publication date: July 1, 1995
- Publication place: United States
- Media type: Paperback
- Pages: 400
- ISBN: 0-553-56468-4

Tales from the Mos Eisley Cantina (1995) is an anthology of short stories set in the fictional Star Wars universe. The book is edited by Kevin J. Anderson. It is based on characters seen in the Mos Eisley cantina, a shady bar filled with aliens that was first shown in the 1977 film Star Wars.

In 1996, Dark Horse Comics released a similarly titled, but not directly related, one-shot comic titled Tales from Mos Eisley.

== Contents ==
#	Title of Story	Authors	Central Characters
1	We Don't Do Weddings: The Band's Tale	Kathy Tyers	Figrin D'an and the Modal Nodes
2	A Hunter's Fate: Greedo's Tale	Tom Veitch and Martha Veitch	Greedo
3	Hammertong: The Tale of the "Tonnika Sisters"	Timothy Zahn	Shada D'ukal and Karoly D'ulin
4	Play It Again, Figrin D'an: The Tale of Muftak and Kabe	A. C. Crispin	Muftak and Kabe
5	The Sand Tender: The Hammerhead's Tale	Dave Wolverton	Momaw Nadon
6	Be Still My Heart: The Bartender's Tale	David Bischoff	Wuher
7	Nightlily: The Lovers' Tale	Barbara Hambly	Feltipern Trevagg and M'iiyoom Onith
8	Empire Blues: The Devaronian's Tale	Daniel Keys Moran	Kardue'sai'Malloc
9	Swap Meet: The Jawa's Tale	Kevin J. Anderson	Het Nkik
10	Trade Wins: The Ranat's Tale	Rebecca Moesta	Reegesk
11	When The Desert Wind Turns: The Stormtrooper's Tale	Doug Beason	Davin Felth
12	Soup's On: The Pipe Smoker's Tale	Jennifer Roberson	Dannik Jerriko
13	At the Crossroads: The Spacer's Tale	Jerry Oltion	BoShek
14	Doctor Death: The Tale of Dr. Evazan and Ponda Baba	Kenneth C. Flint	Cornelius Evazan and Ponda Baba
15	Drawing the Maps of Peace: The Moisture Farmer's Tale	M. Shayne Bell	Ariq Joanson
16	One Last Night in the Mos Eisley Cantina: The Tale of the Wolfman and the Lamproid	Judith and Garfield Reeves-Stevens	Lak Sivrak and Dice Ibegon
	Contributor Biographies	Kevin J. Anderson	

== Reception ==
Scott at TheForce.Net gave the book 3.5 out of 4. He praised the variety of the stories, highlighted the story by Timothy Zahn, and a few others, but found it repetitive how the same few scenes from the film appeared in every story. He concluded: "All of these stories were fun, action packed, and very entertaining, not to mention they had a much greater impact on the Star Wars Universe than you might think! I consider this a must read." Michael Wolff of Starlog Magazine liked the idea but found it wore thin after a while. Of the sixteen stories, he said only a few stood out and praised "Nightlily" by Barbara Hambly and "Soup's On" by Jennifer Robertson, in particular. He concluded "For die-hard Star Wars enthusiasts only."

== See also ==
- Tales from Jabba's Palace
- Tales of the Bounty Hunters
- Tales from the Empire
