= Kenneth C. Flint =

American fantasy novelist

- Born: 23 June 1947; Omaha, Nebraska
- Died: 18 August 2024 (aged 77); Omaha, Nebraska
- Education: University of Nebraska Omaha
- Occupation: Novelist
- Writing career
- Pen name: Casey Flynn
- Genre: Fantasy

Kenneth C. Flint (June 23, 1947 – August 18, 2024) was an American fantasy novelist. He also wrote under the pseudonym Casey Flynn.

A resident of Omaha, Nebraska, Flint taught literature and writing at the University of Nebraska at Omaha for six years before becoming English department head for Plattsmouth High School. In 1986 he quit teaching to become a full-time novelist. A majority of his works are either based on Irish myths and legends, or else are original stories involving concepts, and sometimes characters, from Irish mythology. His earliest and best known works center around three of the most important characters of Irish legend: Lugh, Cúchulainn, and Finn MacCumhal.

In the 1990s he wrote a pair of Star Wars short stories. He also wrote a full novel for the franchise, titled Heart of the Jedi, in 1991 and scheduled for a 1993 release. However, after submitting an initial draft to his editor at Bantam Spectra, he heard nothing, and the book's release was eventually cancelled. An edited draft of the book was later published online by fellow Star Wars author Joe Bongiorno, with a letter from Flint explaining the history of the book and how its cancellation affected him and his family.

Following the cancellation of Heart of the Jedi, Flint retired from writing for a time. In 2004, he published a historical fiction novel, On Earth's Remotest Bounds: Year One: Blood and Water, the first of a planned series based on an alternate American history.

Flint passed away on August 18, 2024, at the age of 77.

== Bibliography ==
=== Finn MacCumhal series ===
1. Challenge of the Clans (1986) Bantam Doubleday, ISBN 0-553-25553-3
2. Storm Shield (1986) Bantam Doubleday, ISBN 0-553-26191-6
3. The Dark Druid (1987) Bantam Books, ISBN 0-553-26715-9

=== Gods of Ireland series ===
Writing as Casey Flynn.

1. Most Ancient Song (1991)
2. The Enchanted Isles (1991)

=== Sidhe series ===
1. The Riders of the Sidhe (1984) Bantam, ISBN 0-553-26606-3
2. Champions of the Sidhe (1985) Bantam Books, ISBN 0-553-24543-0
3. Master of the Sidhe (1985) Spectra Books, ISBN 0-553-25261-5

=== Novels ===
- A Storm Upon Ulster (1981) Bantam Books, ISBN 0-553-24710-7, a.k.a. The Hound of Culain
- Isle of Destiny (1988) Bantam Books, ISBN 0-553-27544-5
- Cromm (1989) Doubleday, ISBN 0-385-26749-5
- Otherworld (1991) Bantam Doubleday, ISBN 0-553-29415-6
- Legends Reborn (1992) Bantam USA, ISBN 0-553-29919-0
- The Darkening Flood (1994) Bantam USA, ISBN 0-553-57163-X
- On Earth's Remotest Bounds: Year One: Blood and Water (2004) iUniverse.com, ISBN 0-595-32059-7
- Star Wars: The Heart of the Jedi (2015) ordered by Lucasfilm, cancelled and years later rewritten and released online

=== Short stories ===
- "Doctor Death: The Tale of Dr. Evazan and Ponda Baba" in Star Wars: Tales from the Mos Eisley Cantina (1995)
- "Old Friends: Ephant Mon's Tale" in Star Wars: Tales from Jabba's Palace (1996)
