= Daniel Keys Moran =

American novelist

- Born: Daniel Keys Moran; November 30, 1962 (age 63); Los Angeles, California, U.S.
- Occupations: Fiction writer, computer programmer
- Writing career
- Period: 1983–present (as writer)
- Genre: Science fiction

Daniel Keys Moran (born November 30, 1962), also known by his initials DKM, is an American computer programmer and science fiction writer.

== Biography ==
Moran was born in Los Angeles to Richard Joseph Moran and Marilynn Joyce Moran. He has three sisters, Kari Lynn Moran, Jodi Anne Moran and Kathleen Moran.

A native of Southern California, he formerly lived (with his former wife Holly Thomas Moran) in North Hollywood. DKM, his third wife Amy Stout-Moran, and their sons Richard Moran and Connor Moran, along with Amy's two daughters and one son, later lived in Woodland Hills, Los Angeles.

In early 2005 Keys Moran lost vision in one eye due to wet macular degeneration.

== Bibliography ==
Moran's first story, "All the Time in the World", appeared in Asimov's Science Fiction in May 1982. This was incorporated into his first novel, The Armageddon Blues: A Tale of the Great Wheel of Existence, which was also the first novel of his projected series "Tales of the Great Wheel of Existence". A sub-series, "Tales of the Continuing Time", has been projected to include 32 volumes in its entirety, of which three novels were published in the late 1980s and early 1990s, and a fourth novel, The A.I. War, Book One: The Big Boost, in 2011.

=== The Great Wheel of Existence ===
The multi-verse in which most of DKM's work is set.

- “The Gray Maelstrom” – Isaac Asimov’s Science Fiction Magazine. Vol. 7 No. 2 (whole no. 62) February 1983. Story art: John Pierard.

==== Human/Praxcelis Union ====
1. “All the Time in the World” – Isaac Asimov’s Science Fiction Magazine. Vol. 6 No. 5 (whole no. 52) May 1982. Story art: Laura Buscemi/Artifact.
2. The Armageddon Blues (expansion of "All the Time in the World") – Bantam Spectra paperback (April 1988). ISBN 0-553-27115-6. Cover art: Jim Burns.
  Quiet Vision hardcover ISBN 978-1-57646-576-9 (April 2001), tradepaper ISBN 1-57646-637-X (June 2002). Cover design: DKM.
3. “Realtime” (with Gladys Prebehalla) Isaac Asimov’s Science Fiction Magazine. Vol. 8 No. 8 (whole no. 81) August 1984. Cover art: Hisaki Yasuda. Story art: Ron Lindahn.
4. The Ring – Bantom Doubleday hardcover (October 1988). ISBN 0-385-24816-4. Jacket art: Shusei. Jacket design: Jamie S. Warren.
  based in part on a screenplay by William Stewart and Joanne Nelson.

==== The Continuing Time ====
1. Emerald Eyes – Bantam Spectra paperback (June 1988). ISBN 0-553-27347-7. Cover art: Paul and Stephen Youll.
  Quiet Vision hardcover ISBN 1-57646-577-2 (June 2001), tradepaper ISBN 1-57646-638-8 (June 2002). Cover art and design: DKM.
2. The Long Run – Bantam Spectra paperback (September 1989). ISBN 0-553-28144-5. Cover art Jim Burns.
  Quiet Vision hardcover ISBN 1-57646-578-0 (August 2001), tradepaper ISBN 1-57646-639-6 (April 2002). Cover design: DKM.
  - Emerald Eyes / "The Star" / The Long Run – Queen Of Angels limited edition hardcover omnibus (August 1998). Jacket art and design: DKM.
    “The Star” is a new short story set between the two novels, and is also included in the Quiet Vision printings of Emerald Eyes.
3. The Last Dancer – Bantam Spectra paperback (November 1993). ISBN 0-553-56249-5. Cover art: Sanjulián.
  Quiet Vision hardcover ISBN 1-57646-579-9 (March 2002). Jacket art and design: DKM.
4. The A.I. War, Book One: The Big Boost – ebook from fs& in multiple formats (March 2011). Cover art: Angel Greenwood.
5. The A.I. War, Book Two: Live Fast and Never Die (chapters 1-3 available at Moran's Patreon page).
6. Tales of the Continuing Time and Other Stories – a self-published collection incorporating material previously available online as well as new stories from the Continuing Time setting and otherwise (December 2018).
7. The Time Wars, Book One: The Great Gods (February 2023; previously serialized at Moran's Patreon page since 2019).
8. The Time Wars, Book Two: The Emerald Throne (serialized at Moran's Patreon page since 2024).
9. Trinity, Book One: Kozmic Blues – with Steve Perry (serialized at Moran's Patreon page since 2019).

==== The Sunset Strip ====
1. Terminal Freedom – with Jodi Moran. Queen Of Angels hardcover (March 1997). Jacket design: DKM.
  Quiet Vision tradepaper ISBN 1-57646-643-4 (February 2002). Cover design: DKM.

=== Other stories ===
- “Given the Game” – Aboriginal Science Fiction. Nov.–Dec. 1990 (No. 24). Cover and story art: Charles Lang.
- “Hard Time” (with Lynn Barker). Star Trek: Deep Space Nine, episode 4×19. (April 15, 1996).
- “On Sequoia Time” – Asimov’s Science Fiction. Vol. 20 No. 9 (whole no. 249) September 1996. Story art: Steve Cavallo.
- “Roughing it During the Martian Invasion” (with Jodi Moran). War of the Worlds: Global Dispatches anthology, edited by Kevin Anderson – Bantam Spectra paperback (May 1997). ISBN 0-553-10353-9.
- A series of commentaries for NPR Sirius’ The Way In, airing in 2001:
  - “The Road Goes Everywhere”
  - “A Freeway in My Back Yard”
  - “The Vast and Endless Sea”
  - “It’s Great to Be Me”
- A Freeway In My Back Yard – a collection of essays, stories, nonfiction, and scripts (April 2011).
- “Uncle Jack” – A Princess of Mars: The Annotated Edition & New Tales of the Red Planet. Anthology with annotations by Aaron Parrett – Sword & Planet trade-paperback (April 2012). ISBN 978-0985425708.

==== Star Wars ====
Three short stories published in Bantam Spectra paperback anthologies, edited by Kevin J. Anderson, with cover art by Stephen Youll.

- "Empire Blues: The Devaronian's Tale" – Star Wars: Tales from the Mos Eisley Cantina (August 1995). ISBN 0-553-56468-4.
- "A Barve Like That: The Tale of Boba Fett" – Star Wars: Tales from Jabba’s Palace (January 1996). ISBN 0-553-56815-9.

Published under the pseudonym J.D. Montgomery, after creative differences with Lucasfilm prevented him from writing the outline he envisioned.

- "The Last One Standing: The Tale of Boba Fett" – Star Wars: Tales of the Bounty Hunters (December 1996). ISBN 0-553-56816-7.
