= Tales from Jabba's Palace =

Short story anthology

- Editor: Kevin J. Anderson
- Author: Kevin J. Anderson; Barbara Hambly; Esther M. Friesner; Kathy Tyers; Mark Budz; Timothy Zahn; William F. Wu; Kenneth C. Flint; Deborah Wheeler; John Gregory Betancourt; M. Shayne Bell; George Alec Effinger; Judith Reeves-Stevens; Garfield Reeves-Stevens; Dave Wolverton; Daryl F. Mallett; Jennifer Roberson; Dan'l Danehy-Oakes; J.D. Montgomery; A. C. Crispin
- Language: English
- Series: Canon C
- Subject: Star Wars
- Genre: Science fiction
- Publisher: Bantam Spectra
- Publication date: December 1, 1995
- Publication place: United States
- Media type: Paperback
- Pages: 464
- ISBN: 0-553-56815-9

Tales from Jabba's Palace is an anthology of short stories set in the fictional Star Wars universe. The book was edited by Kevin J. Anderson and published on December 1, 1995 by Bantam Spectra.

== Contents ==
- Introduction
1. "A Boy and His Monster: The Rancor Keeper's Tale" by Kevin J. Anderson
2. "Taster's Choice: The Tale of Jabba's Chef" by Barbara Hambly
3. "That's Entertainment: The Tale of Salacious Crumb" by Esther M. Friesner
4. "A Time to Mourn, a Time to Dance: Oola's Tale" by Kathy Tyers
5. "Let Us Prey: The Whiphid's Tale" by Marina Fitch and Mark Budz
6. "Sleight of Hand: The Tale of Mara Jade" by Timothy Zahn
7. "And Then There Were Some: The Gamorrean Guard's Tale" by William F. Wu
8. "Old Friends: Ephant Mon's Tale" by Kenneth C. Flint
9. "Goatgrass: The Tale of Ree-Yees" by Deborah Wheeler
10. "And the Band Played On: The Band's Tale" by John Gregory Betancourt
11. "Of the Day's Annoyances: Bib Fortuna's Tale" by M. Shayne Bell
12. "The Great God Quay: The Tale of Barada and the Weequays" by George Alec Effinger
13. "A Bad Feeling: The Tale of EV-9D9" by Judith and Garfield Reeves-Stevens
14. "A Free Quarren in the Palace: Tessek's Tale" by Dave Wolverton
15. "Tongue-tied: Bubo's Tale" by Daryl F. Mallett
16. "Out of the Closet: The Assassin's Tale" by Jennifer Roberson
17. "Shaara and the Sarlacc: The Skiff Guard's Tale" by Dan'l Danehy-Oakes
18. "A Barve Like That: The Tale of Boba Fett" by Daniel Keys Moran (under the pseudonym J.D. Montgomery)
19. "Skin Deep: The Fat Dancer's Tale" by A. C. Crispin
- Epilogue: Whatever Became Of...?

== A Barve Like That: The Tale of Boba Fett ==
Daniel Keys Moran released the story under the pseudonym J.D. Montgomery, after creative differences with Lucasfilm prevented him from writing the outline he envisioned. He planned to have Boba Fett spend years in the sarlacc, but was told he could only be there for a couple of days. He also wanted the sarlacc to demonstrate intelligence, but had to give the role to one of Fett's fellow captives, Susejo ("O Jesus" spelled backwards).

The sequel to the compilation, Tales of the Bounty Hunters, also featured a story subtitled "The Tale of Boba Fett", also by Moran.

== Reviews ==
The book has received reviews:

- by Pat McMurray in Vector 187 (1996)
- by staff in TheForce.net

== See also ==
- Tales from the Mos Eisley Cantina
