= Tales from the Empire =

Anthology of short stories set in the fictional Star Wars universe

- Editor: Peter Schweighofer
- Author: Timothy Zahn; Kathy Tyers; Patricia A. Jackson; Michael A. Stackpole; Laurie Burns; Charlene Newcomb; Tony Russo; Angela Phillips; Erin Endom
- Cover artist: Matt Busch
- Language: English
- Series: Canon C
- Subject: Star Wars
- Genre: Science fiction
- Publisher: Bantam Spectra
- Publication date: December 1, 1997
- Publication place: United States
- Media type: Paperback
- Pages: 324
- ISBN: 0-553-57876-6

Tales from the Empire (1997) is an anthology of science fiction short stories set in the Star Wars universe. The book is edited by Peter Schweighofer.

All short stories featured had previously been published in the Star Wars Adventure Journal magazine.

The centerpoint of the anthology is a short novel by Timothy Zahn and Michael A. Stackpole entitled "Side Trip". The short novel centers on two smugglers, Captain Haber Trell and Maranne Darmic. It features such prominent characters as Grand Admiral Thrawn, Hal and Corran Horn, Zekka Thyne, and Kirtan Loor.

== Contents ==
1. "First Contact" by Timothy Zahn (7 ABY) (Note: BBY and ABY denote years before and after the Battle of Yavin, the setting's conventional date system)
2. "Tinian on Trial" by Kathy Tyers (2 BBY)
3. "The Final Exit" by Patricia A. Jackson (11 BBY)
4. "Missed Chance" by Michael A. Stackpole (6 ABY)
5. "Retreat From Coruscant" by Laurie Burns (8 ABY)
6. "A Certain Point of View" by Charlene Newcomb (0 ABY)
7. "Blaze of Glory" by Tony Russo (11 ABY)
8. "Slaying Dragons" by Angela Phillips (3 ABY)
9. "Do No Harm" by Erin Endom (3 BBY)
10. "Side Trip" by Timothy Zahn and Michael A. Stackpole (2 ABY)
