= Journey to Star Wars =

Disney/Lucasfilm book series

"Journey to Star Wars" is a Disney/Lucasfilm publishing initiative that connects the Star Wars sequel films with previous film installments in the franchise. It currently includes the initiatives "Journey to Star Wars: The Force Awakens", and "Journey to Star Wars: The Last Jedi", and "Journey to Star Wars: The Rise of Skywalker". All titles under the program are canonical to the Star Wars universe.

A group of "at least" 20 novels and comic books related to the 2015 film Star Wars: The Force Awakens was announced in March 2015. The first novels, including Star Wars: Aftermath and Star Wars: Lost Stars, were published in September 2015, prior to the release of The Force Awakens in December 2015.

Three novels and a comic miniseries related to the 2017 film Star Wars: The Last Jedi were announced in April 2017. Two novels, a comic miniseries, and a number of children's books related to the 2019 film Star Wars: The Rise of Skywalker were announced in May 2019.

== History ==
A large number of licensed novels and comics were produced between the originating 1977 film Star Wars and the 2012 acquisition of Lucasfilm by The Walt Disney Company, set in what was dubbed the expanded universe. In April 2014, with The Force Awakens in production, Disney rebranded this body of work as Star Wars Legends and declared it non-canon to the franchise.

"Journey to Star Wars: The Force Awakens", consisting of "at least" 20 novels and comic books from multiple publishers, was announced in March 2015. All titles under the program are canonical to the Star Wars universe, and connect the previous films with The Force Awakens and its forthcoming sequels. The first novels, including Aftermath by Chuck Wendig and Lost Stars by Claudia Gray, were published in September 2015, prior to the release of The Force Awakens in December 2015. At the October 2015 New York Comic Con panel for the Journey to Star Wars: The Force Awakens, more works were announced that would be released from November 2015 through Summer 2017.

Three novels and a comic book miniseries related to the second sequel film, The Last Jedi, were announced at the Star Wars Celebration in April 2017. Multiple other publications were announced under Journey to Star Wars: The Last Jedi at San Diego Comic-Con in July 2017.

On Star Wars Day, May 4, 2019, Lucasfilm released the roadmap of their "Journey to Star Wars: The Rise of Skywalker" campaign leading up to the final film of the sequel trilogy and the nine-film Skywalker Saga. The publishing program is said to detail events occurring over a one-year period in the time taking place between The Last Jedi and The Rise of Skywalker.

== The Force Awakens ==
=== Novels ===
==== Aftermath trilogy ====
- Star Wars: Aftermath (September 2015) by Chuck Wendig
- Star Wars: Aftermath: Life Debt (July 2016) by Chuck Wendig
- Star Wars: Aftermath: Empire's End (February 2017) by Chuck Wendig

Aftermath is set shortly after the 1983 film Return of the Jedi and deals with the consequences of the deaths of Palpatine and Darth Vader, as well as the power vacuum formed in the Empire's rule over the galaxy and the actions of the Rebellion during the following months. The trilogy begins to bridge the Star Wars timeline between Return of the Jedi and The Force Awakens.

==== Young adult ====
- Star Wars: Lost Stars (September 2015) by Claudia Gray, set during the original film trilogy.
- Smuggler's Run: A Han Solo & Chewbacca Adventure (September 2015) by Greg Rucka, set between the films Star Wars (1977) and The Empire Strikes Back (1980).
- The Weapon of a Jedi: A Luke Skywalker Adventure (September 2015) by Jason Fry, set between Star Wars and The Empire Strikes Back. In the novel, C-3PO tells Resistance pilot Jessica Pava the story of Luke Skywalker's adventure after the destruction of the first Death Star as well as one of his first trials with the Force.
- Moving Target: A Princess Leia Adventure (September 2015) by Cecil Castellucci and Jason Fry, set between The Empire Strikes Back and Return of the Jedi. In the novel, an older Leia Organa recounts a past mission for her memoirs. The book also features the character Nien Nunb and introduces the droid PZ-4CO.
- Star Wars: Before the Awakening (December 2015) by Greg Rucka, an anthology book for young readers about the lives of Poe, Rey and Finn before the events of The Force Awakens.

==== Other ====
- Star Wars: Bloodline (May 2016) by Claudia Gray, set several years before The Force Awakens with Leia Organa as the protagonist.

=== Short stories ===
- "Star Wars: The Perfect Weapon" (November 2015) by Delilah S. Dawson, centered on the bounty hunter and First Order spy Bazine Netal.

==== Tales from a Galaxy Far, Far Away: Aliens ====
- "All Creatures Great and Small" (November 2015) by Landry Q. Walker
- "High Noon on Jakku" (November 2015) by Landry Q. Walker
- "The Crimson Corsair and the Lost Treasure of Count Dooku" (November 2015) by Landry Q. Walker
- "The Face of Evil" (November 2015) by Landry Q. Walker
- "A Recipe for Death" (April 2016) by Landry Q. Walker
- "True Love" (April 2016) by Landry Q. Walker

=== Comics ===
- Star Wars: Shattered Empire (Marvel Comics, 2015), written by Greg Rucka and illustrated by Marco Checchetto. The four-part limited series Shattered Empire was published by Marvel Comics between September 9 and October 21, 2015, and is set immediately after Return of the Jedi. It features the parents of Poe Dameron from The Force Awakens, who are members of the Rebel Alliance: his mother is Shara Bey, an A-wing pilot who adventures with Leia Organa, and his father is Kes Dameron, part of a special ground force known as the Pathfinders who are led by Han Solo. The story involves their adventures alongside Leia, Han, Luke Skywalker, Lando Calrissian and others in the aftermath of the Battle of Endor as the Empire attempts to avoid total defeat.
- Star Wars: Poe Dameron (Marvel, April 2016), written by Charles Soule and illustrated by Phil Noto. Set immediately before The Force Awakens, Marvel's Poe Dameron centers on the Resistance X-wing fighter pilot portrayed in the film by Oscar Isaac. It explores Poe's adventures before the start of the film, and includes appearances by Poe's astromech droid BB-8, new X-wing pilots and a new villain from the First Order positioned as Poe's nemesis and whom Soule describes as "fresh and cool". Noto patterned the character's look on Isaac.

=== Reference books ===
- Star Wars: Ships of the Galaxy (September 2015) by Benjamin Harper
- Star Wars: Absolutely Everything You Need To Know (September 2015) by Adam Bray, Cole Horton, Michael Kogge and Kerrie Dougherty
- Star Wars: The Force Awakens Incredible Cross-Sections (December 2015) by Jason Fry
- Star Wars: The Force Awakens Visual Dictionary (December 2015) by Pablo Hidalgo
- The Art of Star Wars: The Force Awakens (December 2015) by Phil Szostak

== The Last Jedi ==
=== Novels ===
- Star Wars: Leia, Princess of Alderaan (September 2017) by Claudia Gray, exploring the early years of Princess Leia.
- Star Wars: Phasma (September 2017) by Delilah S. Dawson, chronicling the backstory of Captain Phasma.
- The Legends of Luke Skywalker (October 2017) by Ken Liu
- Star Wars: A Leader Named Leia (September 2017) by Jennifer Heddle
- Star Wars: The Power of the Force (September 2017) by Brian Rood
- Big Golden Books: Tales of the Force (September 2017)

=== Short stories ===
- Canto Bight (December 2017), a short story collection including works by John Jackson Miller, Saladin Ahmed, Rae Carson, and Mira Grant.

=== Comics ===
- Star Wars: Captain Phasma (Marvel, September 2017), written by Kelly Thompson and illustrated by Marco Checchetto. The four-issue miniseries follows the character between the events of The Force Awakens and The Last Jedi.
- Star Wars Adventures (IDW Publishing, September 2017), an ongoing anthology series aimed at young readers.

=== Reference books ===
- Star Wars: Absolutely Everything You Need To Know, Updated and Expanded (October 2017) by Adam Bray and Cole Horton, Michael Kogge and Kerrie Dougherty
- Stormtroopers: Beyond the Armor (October 2017) by Ryder Windham and Adam Bray
- Star Wars: The Last Jedi Incredible Cross-Sections by Jason Fry
- Star Wars: The Last Jedi Visual Dictionary by Pablo Hidalgo
- The Art of Star Wars: The Last Jedi by Phil Szostak

== The Rise of Skywalker ==
=== Novels ===
==== Adult ====
- Star Wars: Resistance Reborn (November 2019) by Rebecca Roanhorse, covers the difficulties General Leia Organa, Poe Dameron, Finn, and Rey have in rebuilding the Resistance following the defeat to the First Order escaping D'Qar and the Battle of Crait.

==== Young adult ====
- Star Wars: Force Collector (November 2019) by Kevin Shinick, follows a teenager prior to the events of The Force Awakens as he scavenges for relics to make sense of his Force abilities and his possible connection to the Jedi.

==== Kids ====
- Little Golden Book - Star Wars: We are the Resistance (October 2019), written by Elizabeth Schaefer and illustrated by Alan Baston. Highlights iconic scenes from all three films of the sequel trilogy: The Force Awakens, The Last Jedi, and The Rise of Skywalker.
- World of Reading - Star Wars: Resistance Heroes (October 2019), written by Michael Siglain and illustrated by Diogo Saito & Luigi Aimé.
- World of Reading - Star Wars: First Order Villains (October 2019), written by Michael Siglain and illustrated by Diogo Saito & Luigi Aimé.
- Choose Your Destiny: A Finn & Poe Adventure (October 2019), written by Cavan Scott and illustrated by Elsa Charretier. Kids can aid Poe, Finn, and BB-8 on a vital mission for the Resistance.
- Star Wars: Spark of the Resistance (October 2019), written by Justina Ireland and illustrated by Phil Noto. Rey, Poe, and Rose Tico respond to a distress call on the planet Minfar and have to face a First Order battalion, flying creatures, and a weapon that could change the course of the war.

=== Picture books ===
- Star Wars: The Rise of Skywalker - The Galaxy Needs You (December 2019), written by Caitlin Kennedy and illustrated by Eda Kaban. Follow Rey on her hero's journey.

=== Comics ===
- Star Wars: Allegiance (Marvel, October 2019), written by Ethan Sacks and illustrated by Luke Ross. While on the run from the First Order, General Leia Organa reaches out to her old allies the Mon Calamari for assistance in being able to fight back in this four-issue miniseries.
- Star Wars Adventures #27-29 (IDW Publishing, October–December 2019), an ongoing anthology series aimed at young readers. Wookiees defend Kashyyyk against the First Order, and the droids C-3PO, R2-D2, and BB-8 engage in a spy mission for the Resistance.
- Star Wars: The Rise of Kylo Ren (Marvel, November 2019–March 2020), written by Charles Soule and illustrated by Will Sliney. The story explores the backstory of Kylo Ren and the Knights of Ren, and the era of the New Republic.

=== Reference books ===
- Ultimate Star Wars: New Edition (DK Publishing, October 2019) by Adam Bray, Cole Horton, Tricia Barr, and Ryder Windham; with a foreword by Anthony Daniels
- The Moviemaking Magic of Star Wars: Ships & Battles (December 2019) by Landry Walker
- Star Wars: The Ultimate Pop-Up Galaxy (October 2019) by Matthew Reinhart and illustrated by Kevin M. Wilson
- The Art of Star Wars: The Rise of Skywalker (December 2019) by Phil Szostak
- Star Wars: The Rise of Skywalker Visual Dictionary (December 2019) by Pablo Hidalgo
- Star Wars: The Rise of Skywalker Official Guide (DK Publishing, December 2019) by Matt Jones
