= Kylo Ren =

Star Wars character

- Star Wars character
- Adam Driver as Kylo Ren (Note: Promotional image for The Force Awakens (2015))
- First appearance: The Force Awakens (2015)
- Created by: Lawrence Kasdan; J. J. Abrams; Michael Arndt
- Portrayed by: Adam Driver
- Voiced by: Adam Driver (Note: Lego Star Wars: The Force Awakens Disney Infinity 3.0 Star Wars Rebels (archival audio)); Matthew Wood (Note: Star Wars Battlefront II (2017) Star Wars Resistance); Roger Craig Smith (Note: Star Wars Battlefront II (2017))

In-universe information
- Full name: Ben Solo
- Alias: Kylo Ren
- Gender: Male
- Occupation: Jedi Padawan; Supreme Leader of the First Order; Master of the Knights of Ren; Hereditary Prince of Alderaan; Supreme Governor of Birren
- Affiliation: Jedi Order; First Order
- Family: Han Solo (father); Leia Organa (mother)
- Relatives: Shmi Skywalker (great-grandmother); Anakin Skywalker (grandfather); Padmé Amidala (grandmother); Luke Skywalker (uncle)
- Home: Chandrila
- Master: Luke Skywalker; Snoke; Darth Sidious

Kylo Ren (born Ben Solo) is a fictional character in the Star Wars franchise. He was introduced in The Force Awakens (2015), the first film of the sequel trilogy, as the main antagonist. He subsequently appeared in The Last Jedi (2017) and The Rise of Skywalker (2019). He also appears in the animated series Star Wars Resistance (2018–2020), and the television specials The Lego Star Wars Holiday Special (2020) and Lego Star Wars: Terrifying Tales (2021). Ren is portrayed by Adam Driver in all three sequel trilogy films.

At birth, Ren is given the name Ben Solo by his parents Han Solo and Leia Organa. He is trained as a Jedi by his uncle Luke Skywalker, but is seduced to the dark side of the Force by Snoke, the Supreme Leader of the First Order. He assumes the name Kylo Ren and aspires to be as powerful as his grandfather, the Sith Lord Darth Vader. Throughout the sequel trilogy, Ren is an enforcer of the First Order, the leader of the Knights of Ren, and an adversary of Rey. He kills both his father and Snoke, then seizes the position of Supreme Leader. Ren eventually discovers that he shares a connection with Rey called a "Force dyad". He rejects the dark side and helps her defeat the resurrected Emperor Palpatine, then uses the last of his life force to revive her when she collapses.

In addition to appearing in the films and television series, Kylo Ren has also appeared in related media and merchandising. Driver's performance has received acclaim from critics and fans. For his performance in The Force Awakens, Driver won the Saturn Award for Best Supporting Actor, making him the first Star Wars actor since Alec Guinness to win the award. Driver received a second nomination in the same category for his performance in The Rise of Skywalker.

== Concept and creation ==
As late as March 2014, the main antagonist of Star Wars: The Force Awakens was only known to the production team as "Jedi Killer" and had gone through numerous unapproved design attempts (one of which was reused for Captain Phasma, and the others for the Knights of Ren). That same month, Glyn Dillon's design for the character's costume was finally approved. Director J. J. Abrams wanted the design of the character's mask to be memorable to a child and stated that "the design was meant to be a nod to the Vader mask." According to concept designer Doug Chiang, the character "takes on [the] persona of [Vader] to haunt Luke". According to The Force Awakens costume designer Michael Kaplan:

I don't know if it was the kind of spaghetti type lines on it or what, but the next time J.J. [Abrams] came by that was what we presented to him and he loved it. Also the silver in those lines kind of reflects and changes color with the action. You know, if he's standing in front of fire you see that, so it almost brings you into the mask.

Adam Driver's casting in the film in an unnamed role was first announced on April 29, 2014. Kylo Ren was first seen from behind, but still not named, in the 88-second The Force Awakens teaser trailer released by Lucasfilm on November 28, 2014, wielding a jagged red lightsaber with a crossguard. The name Kylo Ren, as well as the character's design, was revealed by Entertainment Weekly in a Lucasfilm-designed Topps-style trading card mock-up on December 11, 2014; a character named "Kybo Ren" was previously featured in the 1985 animated series Star Wars: Droids. A May 2015 Vanity Fair photo shoot by Annie Leibovitz confirmed that Driver would be portraying Kylo.

According to other cast members, Driver is a method actor, meaning that he sometimes stayed in character on set as Ren and left his mask on between scenes. Driver explained that his goal was "to forget you're in Star Wars and treat it like any other job that's filled with moments and problems", because from the perspective of the characters living within the film's universe, "Darth Vader is real."

== Character ==
Abrams told Empire in August 2015, "Kylo Ren is not a Sith. He works under Supreme Leader Snoke, who is a powerful figure on the dark side of the Force." Abrams had previously stated that the character "came to the name Kylo Ren when he joined a group called the Knights of Ren." (Note: Some fans have postulated that the name 'Kylo' is a combination of phonemes from 'Skywalker' and 'Solo', respectively.)

Robbie Collin of The Telegraph described Ren as "a hot-headed, radicalised dark side extremist, whose red lightsaber splutters and crackles as violently as his temper". Abrams noted, "The lightsaber is something that he built himself, and is as dangerous and as fierce and as ragged as the character." The Telegraph also explains that Ren's wild and erratic temper and "angsty" instability make him dangerous. Melissa Leon of The Daily Beast describes Ren's use of the Force as "formidable", citing his ability to stop a blaster shot mid-air, immobilize victims and probe their minds against their will.

Kasdan told Entertainment Weekly in August 2015, "I've written four Star Wars movies now, and there's never been a character quite like the one that Adam [Driver] plays. I think you're going to see something that's brand new to the saga," noting that the character is "full of emotion". Abrams explained, "I think that what makes Ren so unique is that he isn't as fully formed as when we meet a character such as Darth Vader...[Kylo Ren] is not your prototypical mustache-twirling bad guy. He is a little bit more complex than that." Driver said in December 2015 that, despite the visual similarities to Vader, Ren is "unlike any villain the franchise has seen". He explained:

"I feel there's a recklessness about him that's maybe not normally associated with the Dark Side. You normally think of order, and structure, and full commitment and no hesitation...he's just a little bit more unpolished. It's in his costume, in his lightsaber—how you kind of get the sense that it could just not work at any moment; that it could just blow up. That's kind of like a big metaphor for him."

Driver claimed that he was privy to several details of Ren's backstory during the making of the films. According to Lev Grossman, who interviewed the actor in the lead-up to The Rise of Skywalker, Driver reported that "both Han Solo and Leia were way too self-absorbed and into this idea of themselves as heroes to really be attentive parents in the way a young and tender Ren really needed." The backstory of how Ben Solo became Kylo Ren was elaborated upon in a prequel graphic novel titled The Rise of Kylo Ren, which was released by Marvel Comics from December 2019 to March 2020.

Certain aspects of Ren's overall arc across the three films of the sequel trilogy were also known to Driver from the start of production on the first film. He claimed that he "had one piece of information of where it was all going...and things were building towards that". He later clarified:

"J.J. Abrams told me when I met him for the first time that I should imagine a journey of a character completely opposite to Darth Vader...someone who starts as a child and becomes a man over the course of three movies. He becomes closer to his convictions, becomes more assured about his choices, but has metaphorically and physically killed his father to become his own person."

When asked by IGN in December 2017 if he believed Ren was capable of redemption, The Last Jedi writer/director Rian Johnson replied, "Yeah...are you kidding? Darth Vader was worse than Kylo ever was, I think, and Vader got redeemed." Citing the complexity of the character, Johnson articulated, "I don't see the point of trying to get behind his mask and learn more about him if all we're going to learn is 'Yeah, he's just an evil bad guy that needs to be killed.'" The Rise of Skywalker co-writer Chris Terrio also supported this position through comparing Ren with Vader. According to Terrio, "Vader was complicit in genocide and cruelty and depravity. Yet there is this inherent optimism in Star Wars that the light in you is never truly gone. That you can still redeem yourself right up until the last minute – which, in Vader's case, was literally true...Leia never really gave up hope that Ren could be redeemed, and she knew that Rey was probably the way that it would happen." Abrams further elaborated on this point:

"Maybe it's the optimist in me, but I would like to think that anyone, even someone who does the most horrendous things, is redeemable. And certainly because his mother, Leia, is a believer that there is still light in him, it was hard to imagine that she would be wrong about him."

The Rise of Skywalker (2019) revealed that Kylo Ren and Rey are a "dyad" in the Force, which Terrio described as "sort of soulmate[s] in the Force" and "twins of fate, twins of destiny". Their relationship was also described as a romance by both Abrams and Johnson, with Abrams explaining that, during the production of The Force Awakens, he perceived them having as much as a "brother-sister thing" as a "romantic thing" because of their spiritual connection in the Force, while Johnson explains the intimacy developed between the two characters in The Last Jedi because of their interactions during the Force connections. Johnson also explains about Ren's appeal for Rey to join him during The Last Jedi, comparing it with the love confession in the film Notting Hill (1999):

"[T]he moment when Kylo makes his appeal for her to join him, and Adam [Driver] captured it so well in his little please, it was important to me that it wasn't a chess game, it wasn't just a manipulation. It's unhealthy, and there's much that is awful about the way that he is manipulative. From his point of view, it's a very naked, open, emotional appeal. It's his version of, 'I'm just a girl standing in front of a guy'...the same way as when he tells his version of the story with Luke Skywalker, that's his experience of his moment."

== Appearances ==
=== The Force Awakens ===
Kylo Ren was introduced in the 2015 film The Force Awakens as a warlord of the First Order, a tyrannical regime that arose from the remains of the Galactic Empire. After arriving on Jakku to retrieve a map containing the coordinates where Luke Skywalker can be found, Ren kills an elderly man named Lor San Tekka. He orders his stormtroopers to slaughter the local civilians, then captures the Resistance pilot Poe Dameron. Ren learns that Poe has entrusted the map to BB-8, an astromech droid.

It is revealed that Ren is the son of Han Solo and Leia Organa. He was given the name Ben by his parents, and was trained as a Jedi by Luke, his uncle. He was brought to the dark side of the Force by Snoke, the Supreme Leader of the First Order. After Ren is alerted to the presence of BB-8 on Takodana, he travels there and captures the scavenger Rey, who has seen the map. While interrogating her, he realizes she is strong with the Force. She resists his powers and experiences his emotions, realizing that he is afraid he will never be as powerful as his grandfather, Darth Vader.

Kylo Ren, unmasked in Star Wars: The Force Awakens

Han arrives on Starkiller Base and confronts his son. He implores him to abandon the dark side, warning him that Snoke will kill him once he has control of the galaxy. Ren at first seems receptive to his father's request, but then ignites his lightsaber and kills him. Enraged, Han's friend Chewbacca fires at Ren, wounding him. Ren then pursues Rey and the rogue stormtrooper Finn, who are fleeing the now-unstable base. Finn battles Ren with a lightsaber, but Ren overpowers and severely injures him. Rey then takes up the lightsaber and, using the Force, begins to overcome Ren. Before the duel is finished, they are separated by a seismic fissure created by the collapsing base. Rey and Chewbacca escape with the unconscious Finn as Snoke orders General Hux to bring Ren to him to complete his training.

=== The Last Jedi ===
Ren returns in The Last Jedi (2017). He begins having conversations with Rey, whom he connects with through the Force. Rey learns from Luke why Ben Solo turned to the dark side: Luke had seen a vision of the destruction he would cause, and was briefly tempted to kill him in his sleep; when Ben awoke and saw Luke with his lightsaber drawn, he turned on his uncle and destroyed the Jedi Temple. Rey believes there is still good in Ren, and resolves to bring him back.

Ren is reproached by Snoke for his failure to defeat Rey, and Ren subsequently tries to prove himself by leading an attack on a Resistance starship. He hesitates to destroy it when he senses that his mother is on board, but his wingmen blast apart the ship's bridge, which almost kills her. When Rey arrives to confront Ren, he captures her and brings her to Snoke, who tortures her before ordering Ren to kill her. Instead of complying, Ren kills Snoke, then slays his guards with Rey's assistance. Ren then asks Rey to join him in ruling the galaxy. She hesitates and then refuses, realizing that Ren will not abandon the dark side. The two engage in a Force struggle over Luke's lightsaber, which causes it to break in half; Ren is knocked unconscious.

After Rey escapes, Ren frames her for Snoke's assassination. He uses the Force to strangle Hux until he acknowledges him as the new Supreme Leader, then launches an attack on the Resistance base on Crait. When Luke appears during the assault, Ren orders his men to fire on him. The weapons have no effect, and Ren decides to face Luke alone. Luke soon reveals that he is only present as a Force projection, which served as a distraction to allow the Resistance fighters to escape.

=== The Rise of Skywalker ===
In The Rise of Skywalker (2019), Ren has been ruling the First Order for a year. At the start of the film, he is searching for a Sith wayfinder to lead him to the Sith planet Exegol. When he arrives on Exegol, he encounters Emperor Palpatine, who has been resurrected. Palpatine reveals that he has been manipulating Ren and the First Order; he created Snoke to lure Ren to the dark side. Palpatine unveils the Final Order, a Sith armada of superlaser-equipped Star Destroyers built by the Sith Eternal. The Sith Lord tells Ren that if he kills Rey, he will be given the armada and will rule a new Sith Empire.

Ren continues corresponding with Rey through the Force to discern her location. Eventually, Ren informs Rey that the two of them are a dyad in the Force with powerful potential when joined. He also reveals that she is Palpatine's granddaughter, and urges her to join him in overthrowing the Sith Lord. After Rey refuses, Ren follows her to Kef Bir, the location of a second wayfinder. He destroys the wayfinder and engages her in a duel. During their battle, Leia reaches out to Ren through the Force, which distracts him long enough for Rey to impale him. Guilt-ridden, Rey uses the Force to heal Ren, confessing to him that she wanted to take Ben Solo's hand, but not Kylo Ren's. After Rey steals his ship and leaves, Ren converses with a memory of his father, who urges him to renounce the dark side. Following their brief conversation, Ren tosses away his lightsaber and becomes Ben Solo once again.

Ben rushes to help Rey defeat Palpatine on Exegol. She senses his presence and uses their Force connection to give him Luke's lightsaber, which Ben uses to slay the Knights of Ren. Palpatine senses Rey and Ben's dyad connection. The Sith Lord absorbs their life energy to restore his full power, before casting Ben into an abyss. Rey manages to kill Palpatine, but then collapses, seemingly dead. Ben returns and transfers his life essence into her, successfully reviving her but sacrificing his own life in the process. They share a kiss before Ben dies in Rey's arms. His body and the body of Leia simultaneously fade away into the Force.

=== The Lego Star Wars Holiday Special ===
In The Lego Star Wars Holiday Special (2020), Rey travels through time, ending up followed by a Return of the Jedi-era Vader, who takes a key from her that makes time travelling possible. He delivers it to a past version of Palpatine, who wants to know his own future. He and Vader travel forward in time and meet Supreme Leader Ren post-The Last Jedi, who eagerly introduces himself as Vader's grandson. He then informs Palpatine of his apparent death at Vader's hand. Unaware of his own subsequent resurrection, Palpatine decides to recruit Ren as his new apprentice. He brings him to the second Death Star in the past, hoping he will kill Vader and Luke. Rey subsequently arrives with a young version of Luke. They battle Vader and Ren, who again invites Rey to rule the galaxy with him. After BB-8 steals the time key from Palpatine, a saddened Rey sends Ren back to his own time, where he destroys his room in anger.

=== Comics ===
==== Age of Resistance (2019) ====
Kylo Ren appears in the Marvel Comics miniseries Age of Resistance, part of the Age of Star Wars maxi-series composed of one-shot issues focusing on various characters from each trilogy in the Skywalker saga. All of his appearances are set prior to The Force Awakens. In his own self-titled issue, Kylo Ren #1, Ren leads a First Order battalion to victory, succeeding in conquering a planet that Darth Vader had failed to bring under the Empire's control in the past.

In Finn #1, Finn briefly encounters Kylo Ren during the former's time as a sanitation worker on Starkiller Base. In General Hux #1, Ren and General Hux are stranded together on a hostile planet and are forced to put their mutual enmity aside in order to survive. Supreme Leader Snoke #1 showcases Ren's training under Snoke, who subjects Ren to various physical and mental torments in order to foster his anger and strength in the dark side of the Force. Snoke takes Ren to Dagobah, where his uncle Luke Skywalker was trained by Yoda decades before. Entering the cave where Luke once faced a spectral image of Darth Vader, Ren is confronted by similar visions of Luke, Han and Leia. While Ren vanquishes the vision of Luke, he finds himself unable to fully banish the image of his parents, who plead with him to return to the light.

==== The Rise of Kylo Ren (2019–2020) ====
Marvel Comics' The Rise of Kylo Ren depicts how Ben Solo fell to the dark side. As a child, he is trained as a Jedi by Luke Skywalker alongside fellow students Voe, Hennix, and Tai. Voe grows jealous of Ben for his superior Force capability and Luke's perceived favoritism. On a mission to the planet Elphrona to investigate an ancient Jedi outpost with Luke and Lor San Tekka, Ben telepathically communicates with Snoke. Upon arriving on the planet, the trio encounters a group of Force-wielding mercenaries known as the Knights of Ren (after their leader). After Ren agrees to retreat, he unmasks and, placing his mask on the ground, offers Ben an open invitation to the group's ranks if he ever desires in the future.

Several years later, Luke apparently tries to kill Ben in his sleep. Ben fights back and is terrified when a bolt of lightning strikes the Jedi Temple, destroying it. Later that night, Voe, Hennix, Tai return from off-planet to find Ben before the burning Temple. Ben confesses his belief that he has killed Luke, and states that he intends to leave the planet. Believing Ben to be responsible for the Temple's destruction, Voe attacks Ben, leading to Hennix being injured in the melee. Ben leaves the planet on a nearby shuttle, with the trio in close pursuit. Ben goes to meet Snoke, who is scarred from a previous encounter with Luke. Snoke encourages Ben to seek out the Knights of Ren. Traveling to the outpost on Elphrona, Ben retrieves Ren's mask and puts it on, putting the pair in communication. After mentioning Snoke, Ren invites Ben to meet the Knights on Vanrak. Before he can leave, he is confronted by his fellow Padawans.

Ben defends himself from Voe's attacks, and uses the Force to catch her after she falls off of a building. Hennix, believing Ben to have killed her, throws his lightsaber at Ben; in deflecting it, Hennix is bisected. Leaving, Ben collapses the bedrock around Voe and Tai and leaves the planet. Later, Ben meets with Ren and his Knights, who informs him that he will need to provide a "good death" for membership. Providing him with a black outfit, the group proceeds to the mine moon of Mimban, where Ben assists the Knights in stealing an artifact. The Knights subsequently execute a group of locals, horrifying Ben. Suddenly, Voe and Tai arrive, having followed Ben through the Force. Voe attacks the Knights of Ren, while Tai reasons with Ben over his decision to leave. Witnessing this, Ren snaps Tai's neck, killing him, and telling Ben that Snoke was wrong about him. Enraged, Ben duels Ren. Meanwhile, Rey senses Ben from across the galaxy without knowing why; Leia senses Ben's fall, and Palpatine manipulates events from afar, having apparently destroyed the Jedi Temple as well. Then, Ben impales Ren, providing him the "good death" he asked for.

Ben proceeds to kill Voe with Ren's lightsaber, then turns to find the Knights of Ren kneeling before him. Later, Ben bleeds his blue Kyber crystal, cracking it in the process, and forges himself a crossguard lightsaber as the voice of Snoke asks him what his new name is.

=== Books ===
Kylo Ren is a point of view character in the 2015, 2017, and 2019 novelizations of the Star Wars sequel trilogy by Alan Dean Foster, Jason Fry, and Rae Carson.

According to the book Skywalker: A Family at War by Kristin Baver, as the son of Princess Leia, Ben Solo would have inherited the title of "Prince of Alderaan" if the planet and the royal House of Organa had not been destroyed by his grandfather, Darth Vader, and Empire prior to his birth. Upon the birth of Ben Solo, he was considered a member of the Elder Houses of the galaxy, and entitled through hereditary succession to ceremonial titles, including "Supreme Governor of Birren", a small planet settled by Alderaanian explorers in the Inner Rim of the galaxy. Through his maternal grandmother, Padmé Amidala, Ben Solo is also descended from, and related to, the Naberrie family of Naboo.

According to the 2016 novel Star Wars: Bloodline by Claudia Gray, as well as the 2017 Chuck Wendig novel Star Wars: Aftermath: Empire's End, due to the destruction of Alderaan, Princess Leia gave birth to Ben on Chandrila, the home planet of Mon Mothma, as well as the temporary capital of the New Republic. Ben was born in 5 ABY, one year and four days after the Battle of Endor in the film Star Wars: Return of the Jedi (1983). Kylo Ren is also mentioned in the 2017 novel Star Wars: Phasma by Delilah S. Dawson, which takes place before the events of the film Star Wars: The Force Awakens (2015).

According to the 2018 novel Last Shot: A Han and Lando Novel by Daniel José Older, which features a young Ben Solo, the boy was never formally raised or invested as a "Prince of Alderaan", despite his mother leading the Alderaanian diaspora. Out of the 2 billion inhabitants on Alderaan - with the modern-day populations of China and India having about 2.8 billion people combined - about 60,000 survived the destruction of the planet due to being outside of its star system at the time. One of the survivors, Cara Dune, served as a marshal of the New Republic, presumably under Princess Leia, Ben Solo's mother, around 9 ABY. Dune is played by Gina Carano in The Mandalorian.

=== Toys and games ===
Kylo is a playable character in the 2015 The Force Awakens add-on to the Disney Infinity 3.0 video game, with an Infinity character figurine available separately. He is also a character in the strategy video game Star Wars: Force Arena.

Hasbro has released a 3 3/4-inch (9.5 cm) Kylo Ren action figure, and a 6-inch (15 cm) figure in their Black Series line. He is also featured in the Lego Star Wars playsets Kylo Ren's Command Shuttle (2015) and Battle on Takodana (2016), as well as a Lego Buildable Figure. The Lego version of Kylo also appears in the 2016 short form animated series Lego Star Wars: The Resistance Rises, and as a playable character in Lego Star Wars: The Force Awakens and Lego Star Wars: The Skywalker Saga.

Kylo appears in Star Wars Battlefront II, voiced by Matthew Wood and Roger Craig Smith, masked and unmasked respectively. In the game, Kylo interrogates Del Meeko about Lor San Tekka's location (who possess the map to Luke Skywalker) using his Force abilities. When Del finally relents and reveals the map and Lor San Tekka's location, Kylo leaves him for Hask, Del's former comrade in Inferno Squad.

Kylo appeared as a playable character in Fortnite on December 2019.

=== Television ===
In January 2016, Driver reprised the role for a Star Wars: Undercover Boss sketch on Saturday Night Live, with Kylo Ren disguising himself as a radar technician named "Matt" to determine what the Starkiller Base employees really think of him. Driver again reprised the role in January 2020 for a follow-up Saturday Night Live sketch titled "Undercover Boss: Where Are They Now?" in which Kylo goes undercover as "Randy", an entry-level intern on a star destroyer.

Kylo Ren, voiced once again by Matthew Wood, also appears in the Star Wars Resistance series finale episode "The Escape", where he kills Agent Tierny for failing to destroy the Colossus Resistance. Kylo Ren is also one of the numerous voices heard in the fourth and final season of Star Wars Rebels in the episode "A World Between Worlds", with an excerpt of Driver's dialogue from The Force Awakens being used.

=== Theme parks ===
Kylo Ren appears as a walk-around character within Star Wars: Galaxy's Edge at Disneyland and Disney's Hollywood Studios. The character appears during Star Tours – The Adventures Continue and Star Wars: Rise of the Resistance, with the latter featuring the character in audio-animatronic form with Driver providing the voice.

=== Theater ===
In November 2019, Ichikawa Ebizō XI starred in a kabuki production that depicted events in Ren's life from The Force Awakens and The Last Jedi. The production was titled Star Wars Kabuki: Kairennosuke and the Three Shining Swords. In addition, his son Kangen Horikoshi portrayed a younger version of Ren in the play's third act.

== Reception ==
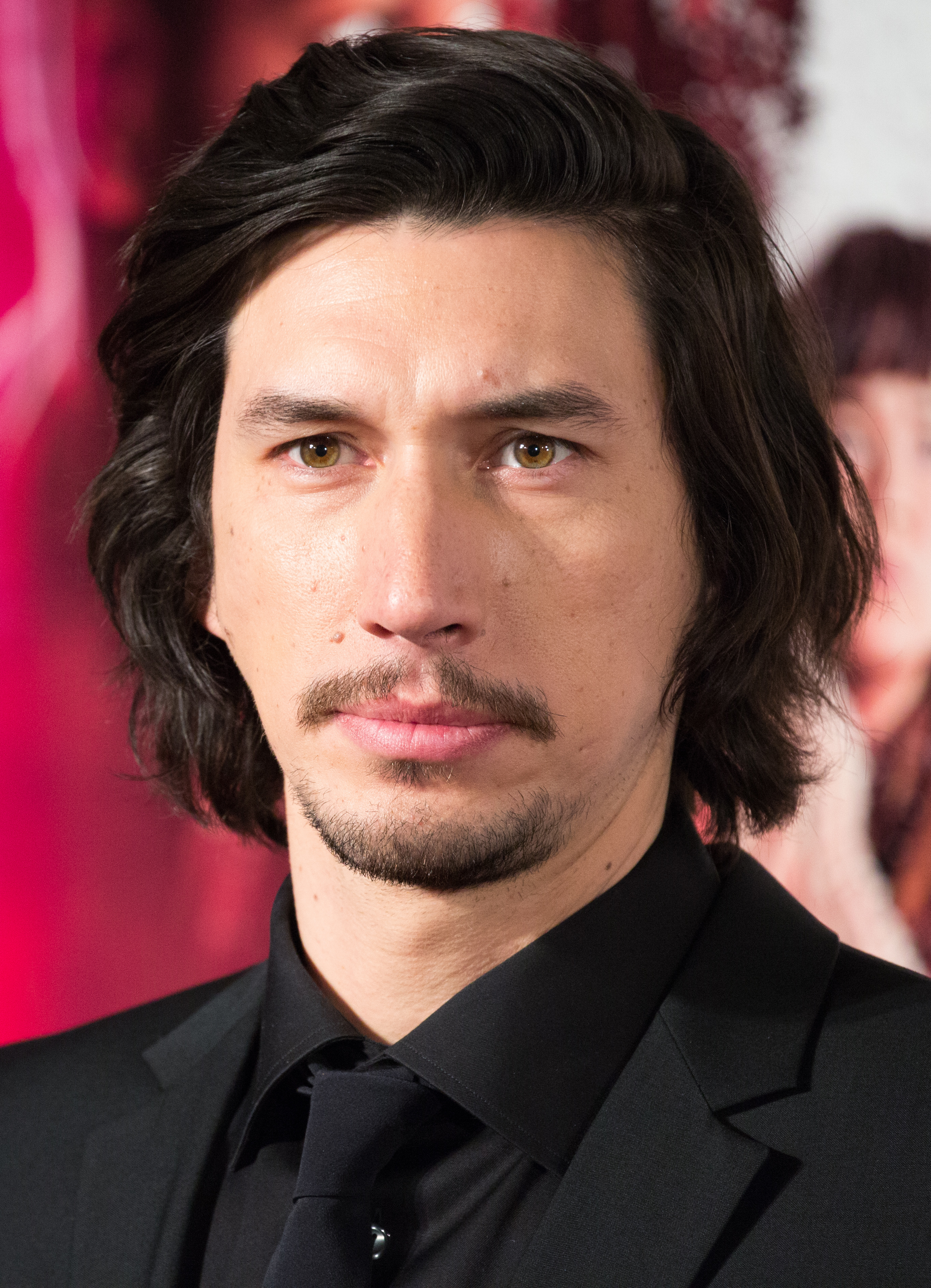
Adam Driver received critical acclaim for his portrayal of Kylo Ren.

The character and Driver's portrayal have received critical acclaim; Driver won the 2016 Saturn Award for Best Supporting Actor for his portrayal. In January 2018, Ren was voted seventh greatest movie villain of all time by the readers of Empire.

Many reviewers commended Ren's conflicted nature and depth, as well as his costume design, and noted there were many places the character could be taken in future installments. Peter Bradshaw of The Guardian praised the character and the actor alike, saying, "He is gorgeously cruel, spiteful and capricious – and unlike the Vader of old, he is given to petulant temper tantrums, with his lightsaber drawn." Terri Schwartz of IGN also called Driver's performance "spectacular", noting that "his performance adds great depth to a character who could have come off as one-dimensional, and the implications of his arc leave a viewer with plenty to think about after they leave the theater".

Robbie Collin of The Daily Telegraph wrote, "To describe Kylo Ren as this film's Vader would be accurate in a sense...but it would also be to undersell the deep ingenuity with which this astonishing character has been crafted by Abrams, Kasdan and Arndt, and also the wells of emotional tumult Driver invests in him." Comparing the character to the one-note Vader of the 1977 film, Melissa Leon of The Daily Beast called Ren "a living battleground between darkness and light, making him a far more resonant and familiar portrayal of that struggle than we've ever seen in Star Wars...[which] makes him a far more interesting villain".

JJ Abrams told Entertainment Weekly, "It was a great joy to work with Adam Driver on this role, because he threw himself into it in a deep and remarkable way." Todd McCarthy of The Hollywood Reporter noted, "Ren is given a pronounced inferiority complex, a clever bad guy twist that could be taken to interesting places both in the writing and performance." Peter Travers of Rolling Stone wrote, "The bald-faced attempt to clone Darth Vader, one of the greatest badasses in film history, is clankingly obvious, but Driver, masked and unmasked, gives him hypnotic and haunting contours." Kyle Buchanan of Vulture was underwhelmed by the reveal of Driver under the mask. Leon, however, argued:

"But that face—that of a normal, vulnerable young man—is the most subversively terrifying thing about J. J. Abrams' reimagining of A New Hope. Rather than pure evil, Ren is something far more familiar: He is human. Just like the real-life young men with minds clouded by fear, hate, and anger who commit unspeakable acts in our world every day ...all the visual cues that leave the character open to criticisms of not being 'evil' enough—are all signs of Ren's struggle between the Dark Side and the Light."

Some viewers noted that Ben Solo/Kylo Ren's character arc shares similarities with that of the Star Wars Expanded Universe character Jacen Solo, the son of Han Solo and Princess Leia, who threatens the galaxy as a fallen Jedi and new Sith Lord known as Darth Caedus. Additionally, critics have noted a resemblance between Ren's character design and that of Revan, a character from Knights of the Old Republic.

== Family tree ==
Skywalker family tree

Aika Lars (Note: Appears in Pablo Hidalgo's Star Wars Character Encyclopedia: Updated and Expanded (2016))
Beru Whitesun

Cliegg Lars
Owen Lars

Shmi Skywalker-Lars
Anakin Skywalker; Darth Vader
Luke Skywalker

Jobal Naberrie (Note: Attack of the Clones (2002) and Revenge of the Sith (2005)) | Ruwee Naberrie
Padmé Amidala | Bail Organa
Leia Organa | Han Solo
Ben Solo; Kylo Ren

House of Organa
Breha Organa

== See also ==
- Skywalker family
