= General Hux =

Star Wars character

- Star Wars character
- Domhnall Gleeson as General Hux in The Force Awakens (2015)
- First appearance: The Force Awakens (2015)
- Last appearance: The Lego Star Wars Holiday Special (2020)
- Created by: J. J. Abrams
- Portrayed by: Domhnall Gleeson
- Voiced by: Domhnall Gleeson; Ben Prendergast (Star Wars Resistance, season 2, The Lego Star Wars Holiday Special)

In-universe information
- Full name: Armitage Hux
- Species: Human
- Gender: Male
- Occupation: Grand General of the First Order; Emissary of the Supreme Leader
- Affiliation: First Order
- Family: Commandant Brendol Hux (father); Unnamed kitchen worker (mother)
- Homeworld: Arkanis

General Armitage Hux is a fictional character in the Star Wars franchise. First introduced in the 2015 film Star Wars: The Force Awakens, he is portrayed by Irish actor Domhnall Gleeson. He is an unpleasant military commander in a power struggle with Kylo Ren for the First Order leadership, and being exceeded only by Supreme Leader Snoke. The character first featured in The Force Awakens media and merchandising, and returned in the film's sequels, The Last Jedi (2017) and The Rise of Skywalker (2019).

== Character ==
Hux was born on Arkanis and was rumored to have been sired from an affair between his father, Commandant Brendol Hux of the Arkanis Academy, and a kitchen worker. Hux and his father are rescued from the Academy when it is about to fall to the New Republic near the end of the Galactic Civil War. When the war ends with the Battle of Jakku and the signing of the Galactic Concordance, the young Hux and his father are part of the Imperial Navy forces who retreat into the Unknown Regions. These forces later emerge as the First Order. The Republic believes that the First Order is just an unimportant band of Imperial holdouts, but Hux's training methods forge a formidable military that effectively overthrows the Republic and turns the galaxy into a dictatorship even more brutal than the Galactic Empire of the original Star Wars trilogy. He serves as the right hand of the First Order's Supreme Leader Snoke (Andy Serkis), second in authority only to Kylo Ren (Adam Driver), with whom he has a fierce rivalry. He is dedicated to destroying the Resistance, an army that grew out of the Rebel Alliance and is led by General Leia Organa (Carrie Fisher). Hux believes that the Republic is a threat to galactic stability, and that it is his destiny to rule the galaxy.

== Appearances ==
=== Film ===
==== The Force Awakens (2015) ====
Hux first appears in The Force Awakens as a high-ranking general in the First Order. Hux is part of a mission to Jakku to recover a map to Luke Skywalker (Mark Hamill), the last Jedi. After the battle, he learns from Captain Phasma of the desertion of a former stormtrooper, Finn (John Boyega). To destroy the Resistance, Snoke orders Hux to use the Starkiller Base superweapon against the New Republic's capital world of Hosnian Prime. Hux gives a speech before the First Order army about the end of the Republic before Starkiller Base fires on Hosnian Prime under his command, killing billions of people in the destruction.

Hux reports to Snoke that Kylo Ren has stopped the search for the droid BB-8, which has the aforementioned map, so Snoke orders him to turn the Starkiller weapon towards the Resistance base on D'Qar. Before Hux can destroy the planet, however, an attack squadron led by Resistance Commander Poe Dameron (Oscar Isaac), with ground support from Han Solo (Harrison Ford), Finn, and the Jakku scavenger Rey (Daisy Ridley), destroys Starkiller Base. Hux is ordered by Snoke to flee the planet and bring Kylo Ren to him.

==== The Last Jedi (2017) ====
Hux appears in The Last Jedi as the primary general reporting directly to Supreme Leader Snoke. He attempts to respond to a transmission from Dameron, who mocks him by asking for a General "Hugs" and describing his complexion as "pasty". Hux then leads the subsequent battle, during which both sides sustain heavy losses. Snoke rebukes Hux for his failure to defeat the Resistance, but he tells him about a plan to track the Resistance. Hux subsequently oversees the bombardment of the remaining three ships of the Resistance, then on the lifeboats, and, along with Phasma, helps arrange the execution of Finn and Rose Tico. Later, he discovers Snoke dead and Ren unconscious in the throne room of the Mega-class Star Dreadnought Supremacy, so he attempts to kill his rival but stops when Ren wakes up. He initially protests Ren's claim to be the new Supreme Leader, but is swiftly persuaded otherwise when Ren uses the Force to choke him, proclaiming "Long live the Supreme Leader." At the end of the film, he accompanies Ren to the planet Crait in their attempt to finish off the Resistance. When Ren orders his men to fire on Luke, Hux gives the order to stop it soon after. After Ren wants to kill Luke himself, Hux admonishes him to focus on the escaping Resistance members; Ren silences him by using the Force to slam him into a wall, knocking him out. Hux is seen again when Ren and his troops invade the Resistance base and find it empty, giving Ren a sinister glare from behind.

==== The Rise of Skywalker (2019) ====
By the time of Star Wars: The Rise of Skywalker, Hux has become embittered and jealous because of the lack of respect he receives and his rivalry with Allegiant General Pryde (Richard E. Grant), who constantly undermines Hux while vying for his job. Hux is even more upset to hear that Emperor Palpatine has returned from the dead and that he was the one behind the creation of Snoke, as the Sith Lord arranged for the Sith Eternal's fleet of Xyston-class Star Destroyers, the Final Order, that can wipe out planets for the First Order. Hux is later revealed to have been a spy supplying information to the Resistance in order to undermine Ren in the hopes of taking his place as Supreme Leader (or at least seeing Ren falling along with the First Order if necessary). He helps Finn, Poe and Chewbacca escape Ren's Resurgent-class Star Destroyer Steadfast and has Finn shoot him in the leg so he can feign an effort to stop them. However, he is shot in the chest with a blaster by Pryde after the latter realizes Hux's treason through his cover story. Hux's decision to allow the rebels to escape is a major catalyst for the Resistance's victory in the Battle of Exegol.

A deleted scene from the film featured Hux and Pryde in the opening action sequence with Kylo Ren on Mustafar.

=== The Lego Star Wars Holiday Special (2020) ===
Hux briefly appears in segments of The Lego Star Wars Holiday Special set between the events of The Last Jedi and The Rise of Skywalker. Upon walking in on a shirtless Kylo Ren with reports on the status of the First Order, Hux is left flustered by Ren's shirtless state, attempting to give his report without being distracted by him. After Ren is forcibly returned to the present from the past by Rey, Hux enters Ren's room to provide another report as he is destroying it with his lightsaber in frustration, silently immediately backing out of the room upon noticing Ren's wrathful state.

=== Other media ===
Hux appears via hologram in the first season finale of the animated series Star Wars Resistance. The episode takes place at the same time as The Force Awakens and depicts First Order troops watching a transmission of Hux give his speech and the subsequent firing of Starkiller Base. He appears, in person, in the eleventh episode "Station to Station" of the second season and in hologram in the finale of season two, "The Escape", along with Kylo Ren.

Hux appears in two theme park attractions, Star Tours – The Adventures Continue and Star Wars: Rise of the Resistance with Gleeson reprising the role in each.

Some details about the backstory of Hux and his father Brendol appear in the 2016 novel Star Wars: Aftermath: Life Debt by Chuck Wendig. Hux and Brendol are also characters in the 2017 novel Star Wars: Phasma by Delilah S. Dawson.

Hux also is a playable Dark Side squad leader in an update to the mobile MOBA Star Wars: Force Arena, released in late 2017.

== Reception ==
In his review of The Force Awakens, Henry Barnes of The Guardian wrote that Gleeson's "screechy pseudo-Nazi role" as General Hux is "not as colourful or as nuanced" as Adam Driver's part as Kylo Ren, "but – given he's a functionary – Gleeson certainly makes an impression." However, after the release of Star Wars: The Last Jedi, and Star Wars: The Rise of Skywalker, some criticism was levelled at the use of the character to provide comic relief, particularly after having been introduced as a serious villain. The character's story arc was also discussed. The revelation that he had become a Resistance spy and his subsequent "unceremonious" death was subject to some criticism.
