= Star Wars: Galaxy's Edge: Black Spire =

2019 novel by Delilah S. Dawson

Star Wars Galaxy's Edge: Black Spire
- The cover art of Star Wars: Galaxy's Edge: Black Spire
- Author: Delilah S. Dawson
- Cover artist: Darren Tan
- Language: English
- Series: Star Wars Books, Star Wars Canon
- Genre: Adventure; War; Science fiction; Action Thriller; Espionage
- Publisher: Del Rey Books
- Publication date: August 17, 2019
- Publication place: United States
- Pages: 576 (paperback)
- ISBN: 9781780899916

Star Wars Galaxy's Edge: Black Spire is a 2019 novel written by Delilah S. Dawson and published by Del Rey Books. The novel is a sequel to the 2018 novel Phasma, also by Dawson. It takes place in the Star Wars galaxy, immediately after the events of Star Wars Episode VIII: The Last Jedi.

== Plot summary ==
Vi Moradi, the main protagonist, is tasked with setting up a base for the Resistance by General Leia Organa. She travels to the fictional planet Batuu, which is also the site of Disney's Star Wars theme park attraction. She is aided by Archex, a former First Order stormtrooper. Together, they recruit locals and build a small resistance camp to fight the nearby First Order presence that has been alerted to Vi and Archex's presence.

== Reception ==
The book met mixed reviews from multiple critics, some praised the book while others didn't especially enjoy it.

- Megan Crouse of Den of Geek wrote "Star Wars Galaxy’s Edge tie-in novel Black Spire is about good people, but, unfortunately, isn’t a very good novel. "
- Brian Silliman from Syfy Wire wrote: It's one of the first real glimpses we've gotten into what happened after [The Last Jedi] and it is a highly interesting read.
- Meg Dowell from the website Dork Side of the Force wrote "...Delilah S. Dawson has told an unforgettable story that has a major impact on the future of the Skywalker saga ... definitely add this book to your list. "
