= Not My Circus, Not My Monkeys =

Not My Circus, Not My Monkey or Not My Circus, Not My Monkeys may refer to:

- Not My Circus, Not My Monkey (The Hitman Blues Band), an album by The Hitman Blues Band
- "Not My Circus, Not My Monkeys" (novella), a novella by Delilah S. Dawson
