= Captain Phasma =

Character in Star Wars

- Star Wars character
- Gwendoline Christie as Captain Phasma in The Force Awakens (2015)
- First appearance: The Force Awakens (2015)
- Created by: J. J. Abrams
- Portrayed by: Gwendoline Christie
- Voiced by: Gwendoline Christie (Lego Star Wars: The Force Awakens, Star Wars Battlefront II (2017) and Star Wars Resistance season 1); Ellen Dubin (Lego Star Wars: The Resistance Rises and Star Wars Resistance season 2)
- Designed by: Michael Kaplan

In-universe information
- Gender: Female
- Title: Captain
- Occupation: Stormtrooper commander
- Affiliation: Scyre; First Order
- Family: Keldo (brother)
- Homeworld: Parnassos

Captain Phasma is a fictional character in the Star Wars franchise, portrayed by English actress Gwendoline Christie. Introduced in Star Wars: The Force Awakens (2015), the first film in the Star Wars sequel trilogy, Phasma is the commander of the First Order's force of stormtroopers. Christie returned to the role in the next of the trilogy's films, Star Wars: The Last Jedi (2017), and in the animated television series Star Wars Resistance (2018) and several video games. The character also made an additional appearance in Before the Awakening, an anthology book set before the events of The Force Awakens.

J. J. Abrams created Phasma from an armor design originally developed for Kylo Ren and named her after the 1979 horror film Phantasm. The character was originally conceived as male. Phasma appeared prominently in promotion and marketing for The Force Awakens, but the character's ultimately minor role in the film was the subject of criticism, a complaint repeated for her appearance in The Last Jedi. Nonetheless, merchandise featuring the character found success, and her figure was the best-selling of all The Force Awakens action figures on Amazon.co.uk.

== Concept and creation ==
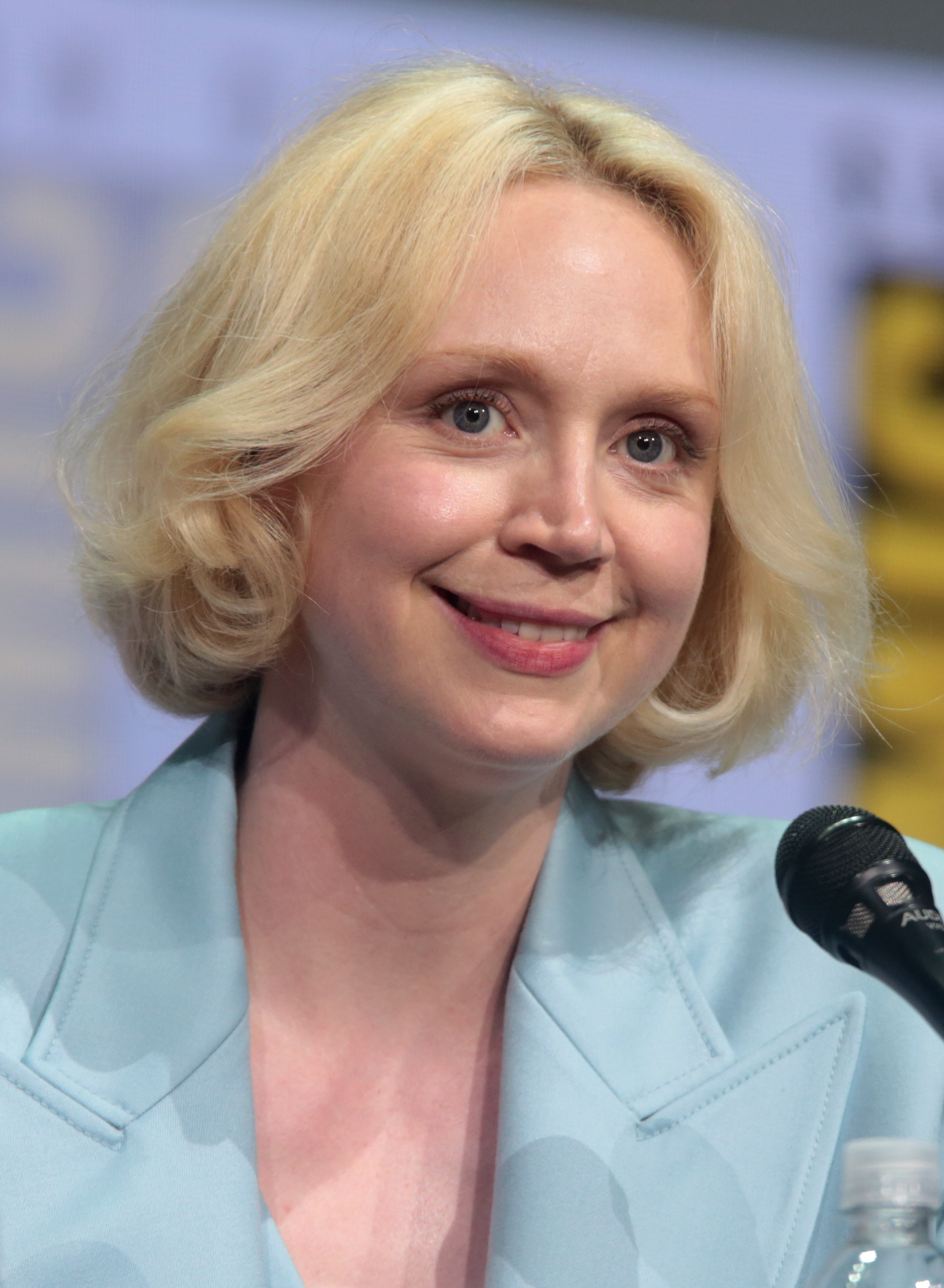
Gwendoline Christie portrays Captain Phasma.

The character's creation was inspired by a rejected design for Kylo Ren. Costume designer Michael Kaplan came up with the concept of Kylo being "the Lord of the Stormtroopers, in bright shining silver armor". Kaplan had a strong image in his head of what this concept should look like, which concept artist Dermot Power turned into an illustration. This image, however, was immediately rejected by director J. J. Abrams. Later, producer Kathleen Kennedy found the design, reacting positively and calling it "fantastic". Abrams then used the design to create a new character, Phasma. He named Phasma after the 1979 horror film Phantasm because her armor reminded him of the film's spheres. Kaplan intended for the visuals of the First Order to contrast with that of the Resistance, appearing in colors like "black, teal blue, and steel gray", with stormtroopers being updated to be more simplified and modernized. Kaplan designed the character believing it would be "extremely cool" to have a silver armored character in the film.

The character was not originally conceived as a woman, but rather was changed from male to female during casting, less than three weeks before principal shooting began. Phasma thereby became the second on-screen female Star Wars villain, after Zam Wesell. With Captain Phasma, the filmmakers wished to "push the boundaries" of traditional roles for female characters.

Actress Gwendoline Christie, who had previously played Brienne of Tarth in Game of Thrones, was first officially confirmed as Captain Phasma in a Vanity Fair spread released May 4, 2015, following its leak. Christie fought heavily to appear in the film, continually insisting her agent get her a part in it. Christie was not aware that the character was originally a man. Christie took inspiration from her armor—"it's very high-functioning, it's very imposing and it's not malleable at all"—in how to play the character. In playing Phasma, Christie felt encouraged to experiment more with the gesture of a character.

Her initial costume, used in The Force Awakens, had to be created over a period of "four or five days"; co-costume designer Dave Crossman described its physical creation as "a complete panic". It took Christie roughly forty-five minutes to put on. A new suit was created for The Last Jedi, with various tweaks. Its helmet was re-chromed, the fit was altered, and the armor was made "much cleaner and shinier."

== Character ==
The commander of the First Order's stormtroopers, Captain Phasma is described as a "tough veteran commander" and one of a "commanding triumvirate" of the First Order alongside Kylo Ren and General Hux. Christie compared Phasma to Boba Fett in the sense of being a character who, while not "at the forefront of the action all the time", still has "a lot of impact". The actress called the character "a malevolent force" who takes pleasure in her cruelty, something she attributed to a perceived difficult journey to becoming the only female stormtrooper of rank. To contrast with other stormtroopers in the franchise, Christie portrayed Phasma with both some femininity and sassiness. Glen Robert Gill, writing for Bright Lights Film Journal, saw Phasma as "the demonic or negative emanation of the maidenly anima".

Phasma is depicted wearing salvaged chromium armor, which in The Force Awakens' visual dictionary is established as coming from a Naboo yacht once owned by Palpatine. It is said to serve "primarily as a symbol of past power". Christie recognised the character's helmet as both being futuristic and having medieval elements. Chris Laverty, creator of costume analysis site Clothes on Film, called her armor "probably the most regal costume" in The Force Awakens, and noted it as a reflection of her status. He also felt her cloak, "elegantly slung over one shoulder", was a method of humanizing the character. In-universe, the cloak is the "traditional cape of First Order command". Gill felt her armor called to mind mirrors, symbols of "self-reflection and self-examination", the feelings she brings in Finn when she inadvertently helps inspire him to defect.

== Appearances ==
=== Film ===
==== The Force Awakens (2015) ====
The second trailer for the 2015 film Star Wars: The Force Awakens introduced the character. As the film opens, Phasma is leading an attack at Tuanul, a settlement village on the desert planet Jakku, in search of a galaxy map that leads to the last Jedi, Luke Skywalker. After the battle is won, Phasma and the other stormtroopers execute the remaining villagers. Back on the Resurgent-class Star Destroyer Finalizer, she meets with stormtrooper FN-2187, and reprimands him for having removed his helmet without permission. FN-2187 later flees and frees Poe Dameron (who renames him Finn). Phasma is present when Finn's defection is discovered; she mentions that Finn had never committed any infractions in the past. Later, when Finn, Han Solo, and Chewbacca infiltrate Starkiller Base, they take Phasma hostage and pressure her to deactivate the base's shields, intending to drop her in the trash compactor. However, she escapes during the destruction of the planet-converted superweapon.

==== The Last Jedi (2017) ====
Phasma appears in Star Wars: The Last Jedi when Finn, mechanic Rose Tico, and computer hacker DJ infiltrate the Mega-class Star Dreadnought Supremacy, a 37.5 miles (60.4 km)-wide flagship, in an attempt to disable the ship's tracking device. They are captured and brought before Phasma and her stormtroopers. Phasma taunts Finn, and orders his execution with Rose in a "slow and painful" way. Before this can occur, Vice Admiral Holdo rams her MC85 Star Cruiser Raddus into the Supremacy at lightspeed. In the ensuing chaos, Phasma and Finn fight. At first, Phasma gets the upper hand, knocking Finn into a pit. Finn emerges unharmed from the pit, riding its elevator; he knocks Phasma down, breaking the visor of her helmet, and exposing part of her face around the left eye. The floor crumbles beneath Phasma, and she falls into the flames below.

In a deleted scene, the battle with Phasma and her fate are significantly different: She and four stormtroopers manage to surround Finn, who taunts Phasma about her compliance to his demands in The Force Awakens. Before the stormtroopers can turn on her, Phasma kills all of them and then prepares to attack Finn, but he manages to cut her hand off and blasts her into the ship's wreckage.

The Last Jedi director Rian Johnson said that Phasma's limited supporting role in the film was due to time constraints and an already large cast of characters, and indicated that there were no other plans for Phasma in the films. Though Phasma's fate was left unknown and the possibility of her returning in Star Wars: The Rise of Skywalker was hinted, John Boyega officially confirmed at the Episode IX panel, during Celebration Chicago, that Phasma had indeed died in The Last Jedi.

=== Television ===
Phasma appears in the 2018 animated series Star Wars Resistance, voiced by Gwendoline Christie.

=== Literature ===
Before the Awakening, a prequel anthology, features the character in a short story centered around Finn. In it, she monitors Finn's performance in combat simulation and, although praising his skill, she criticizes his rescuing of a weaker soldier. Additionally, Phasma is featured in both the adult and junior novelizations of The Force Awakens.

In the lead-up to The Last Jedi's release, Phasma's backstory was explored in Star Wars: Phasma, a novel by Delilah S. Dawson. Though Phasma's origins and character are discussed, the novel is not told from Phasma's perspective.

==== Comics ====
A four-part comic miniseries, Star Wars: Captain Phasma, was announced in April 2017 as part of the Journey to Star Wars: The Last Jedi initiative. The series was written by Kelly Thompson with art by Marco Checchetto, and published by Marvel Comics between September 6 and October 18, 2017. It explains Phasma's escape from Starkiller Base during the climax of The Force Awakens, and subsequent events. She pursues loose ends while framing Lieutenant Sol Rivas for lowering the shields to the First Order's superweapon. Her pursuit takes her to the planet Luprora after she requisitions a TIE fighter, its pilot, and an astromech droid. In a flashback in issue #3, Phasma mentions Siv, a character from the 2017 novel Phasma. Reviewing for IGN, Jesse Schedeen wrote that Thompson's "efficient approach to storytelling, coupled with the gorgeous tag-team combo that is Marco Checchetto and Andres Mossa, makes this a Star Wars comic every Phasma fan should read."

=== Other media ===
The Lego Star Wars version of Phasma also appears in the 2016 short form animated series Lego Star Wars: The Resistance Rises. She is also a playable character and boss in the Lego adaptations of The Force Awakens and The Skywalker Saga.

Captain Phasma was added to Fortnite on May 1st 2025 as part of their LEGO Pass during their Star Wars themed season.

=== Merchandise ===
As part of the lead-up to the film, Disney released a wave of Star Wars toys on 2015's "Force Friday". One such toy was a Phasma voice-changing mask, which contained the first dialogue heard by the public. Other items included a costume for children as well as action figures.

== Reception ==
Phasma received attention before release. Before her name was confirmed, Phasma had been dubbed "the Chrometrooper" by fans. The trademarking of "Captain Phasma" led to speculation that it was the name of Christie's rumored character, said to be an Imperial officer pursuing Finn. Phasma had been the name of a character in one Star Wars fanfic, Tarkin's Fist, leading to MovieWeb wondering if it was an intentional homage. IGN's "Keepin' It Reel" podcast discussed the possibility of Phasma being "the next breakout baddie" in the vein of Boba Fett and Darth Maul. They responded positively to the character's name, despite some initial misgivings, for fitting in with the franchise's Flash Gordon roots. They also praised her armor design, stating that character design had been important in the success of Fett and Maul. They similarly had high hopes for Christie's acting. During the lead-up to the film, Phasma became a fan favorite. Polygon's Susana Polo considered The Force Awakens a great achievement for Hollywood for its diversity regardless of its quality, though she used Phasma as an example of how the film was not perfect, noting rumors of Phasma's minor role despite her being the first on-screen female stormtrooper.

Upon The Force Awakens' release, criticism fell on the character's minimal role in the film. The Telegraph's Jonathan McAloon called his "one criticism" of The Force Awakens the underuse of Phasma, and wondered if her face would ever be revealed in the films. Jason Guerrasio of Business Insider echoed the sentiment, noting her lack of screen time despite her great potential. Scott Meslow, writing for The Week, criticized the film's lack of nuance in its villains, calling her "a total cipher" in the film despite her heavy appearance in its promotion. He pointed to her appearance in Before the Awakening as a way to expand her character, noting her cold yet logical pragmatism in it. Jesse Schedeen of IGN called Phasma "something of a disappointment in The Force Awakens", negatively contrasting her against Fett in that "even Fett had the distinction of outsmarting Han Solo before meeting an ignominious end". Schedeen hoped Phasma would be revisited in Marvel's Star Wars comics, to help flesh out her character and build her into a better villain. Max Nicholson, writing for Collider, noted the amount of hype for the character, as well as her minimal role in the story. Nicholson suggested that Hux and Phasma should have been merged into one character, as they were too similar, or Phasma should have been given the melee fight scene given to a trooper nicknamed "TR-8R" by fans. Bill Keveney of USA Today negatively compared Phasma's skill as a warrior to Christie's character Brienne of Tarth from Game of Thrones. He further criticized Phasma's role in The Force Awakens by attributing the First Order's defeat to being largely her fault, as well as her "recycled" appearance in The Last Jedi.

Merchandise featuring the character proved popular. David Betancourt of The Washington Post called Phasma's role in the film "little more than a shiny new prop", viewing her as a victim of the film's need to introduce all its new characters, yet noted the popularity and rarity of the merchandise surrounding the character. Captain Phasma's figure was the bestselling of The Force Awakens' action figures on Amazon.co.uk.
