= Star Wars: Phasma =

Novel by Delilah S. Dawson

- Author: Delilah S. Dawson
- Audio read by: January LaVoy
- Language: English
- Series: Journey to Star Wars: The Last Jedi
- Genre: Science fiction
- Publisher: Del Rey Books
- Publication date: September 1, 2017
- Publication place: United States
- Media type: Print (Hardcover)
- Pages: 400 (First edition, hardcover)
- ISBN: 978-1-524-79631-0 (First edition, hardcover)

Star Wars: Phasma is a Star Wars novel by Delilah S. Dawson, published by Del Rey Books on September 1, 2017 as part of the Journey to Star Wars: The Last Jedi publishing initiative. It explores the backstory of Captain Phasma, the stormtrooper leader introduced in the 2015 film Star Wars: The Force Awakens.

The novel was announced at the Star Wars Celebration in April 2017, among several works related to The Force Awakens sequel film The Last Jedi. A comic book miniseries called Star Wars: Captain Phasma, exploring Phasma's adventures between the films, was announced at the same time. A stand-alone sequel novel, Star Wars: Galaxy's Edge: Black Spire, was released on August 17, 2019.

Star Wars: Phasma is available as an audiobook and e-book.

== Plot ==
Resistance spy Vi Moradi is captured and brought aboard the First Order Star Destroyer Absolution, where she is interrogated in secret by Cardinal, a stormtrooper captain in red armor. Cardinal seeks information to use against his nemesis, the powerful Captain Phasma. Buying time to stay alive and hopefully effect her escape, Vi tells the extended story of Phasma's origins on the ruined planet Parnassos, as told to her by Siv, one of Phasma's former warriors.

== Publication ==
The novel was announced at the Star Wars Celebration in April 2017, among several works related to The Force Awakens sequel film The Last Jedi. A comic book miniseries called Star Wars: Captain Phasma, exploring Phasma's adventures between the films, was announced at the same time.

The novel was published by Del Rey Books on September 1, 2017.

== Reception ==
Den of Geek wrote: "While it didn’t tell the story from Phasma’s point of view as much as I liked, this was definitely a solid Star Wars story." The Verge called it "an engrossing read". Dork Side of the Force concluded: "The novel is a must read prior to seeing The Last Jedi and will leave you on the edge of your seat the entire time."
