= Delilah S. Dawson =

American author (born 1977)

- Dawson at Dragon Con in 2026
- Born: October 21, 1977 (age 48); Roswell, Georgia, U.S.
- Occupation: Novelist
- Writing career
- Pen name: Lila Bowen
- Language: English
- Period: 2012–present
- Genres: Science fiction; Fantasy; Steampunk; Paranormal romance; Horror; Weird West; Star Wars; Young adult

Delilah S. Dawson (born October 21, 1977) is an American author, primarily of fantasy and science fiction. She writes fantasy as Lila Bowen, and has written erotica as Ava Lovelace.

Her works include Star Wars tie-in fiction (novels Star Wars: Phasma and Galaxy's Edge: Black Spire, and short story Star Wars: The Perfect Weapon), as well as Rick and Morty Presents: Pickle Rick, Kill the Farm Boy and No Country for Old Gnomes (both with Kevin Hearne). She has also written comic books such as Star Pig and Sparrowhawk.

== Career ==
Dawson's work includes the Blud series of steampunk paranormal romance novels, the Shadow series of Weird West novels (as Bowen), as well as several young adult novels. She has also written Star Wars tie-in short stories, including the 2015 Bazine Netal adventure "Star Wars: The Perfect Weapon", and the 2016 Greer Sonnel story "Scorched", published in Star Wars Insider No. 165. In September 2017, Dawson released Star Wars: Phasma, a novel chronicling the backstory of Captain Phasma of the First Order.

From 2025, Dawson took over Terry Brooks's Shannara series., with her first novel published on August 25, 2026. She wrote the first Ravenloft novel, Ravenloft: Heir of Strahd (May 2025), to be published in 17 years.

== Personal life ==
Dawson lives in Roswell, Georgia.

== Reception ==
In 2016, Alex Brown of Tor.com wrote that Dawson is "producing some of the best underappreciated books of the last few years", noting the "difficult subject matter [and] intense imagery" in her young adult works, and her diverse protagonists. In a starred review, Publishers Weekly appreciated that in Dawson's Wake of Vultures, "themes of self-worth, gender, and the complexity of identity are treated with frank realism and sensitivity", as well as her "gritty and well-realized paranormal Wild West". Kirkus Reviews wrote in a starred review of Wake of Vultures that "Bowen has created a fascinating, textured Wild West world. The monsters are gruesome, the battles are bloody, and the pace of this story never flags." Her novel Camp Scare (2022) was nominated for the Bram Stoker Award for Superior Achievement in a Middle Grade Novel.

== Bibliography ==
=== Adult novel ===
- The Violence (2022)
- Bloom (2023)
- Guillotine (2024)
- It Will Only Hurt for a Moment (2024)
- House of Idyll (2025)
- Monstera (2026)

=== Shannara ===
- The First Druids of Shannara book 2 - Brona (2026)

=== Blud series ===
- Wicked as They Come (2012)
- Wicked As She Wants (2013) – Romantic Times Steampunk Book of the Year for 2013, RT Book of the Year nominee 2013
- Wicked After Midnight (2014) – Romantic Times Steampunk Book of the Year Nominee for 2014
- Wicked Ever After (2015)

==== Novellas ====
- The Mysterious Madam Morpho (2012)
- The Peculiar Pets of Miss Pleasance (2013)
- The Damsel and the Daggerman (2014) – Starred review from Library Journal

==== Short stories ====
- "The Three Lives of Lydia" from Carniepunk anthology (2013)
- "Uncharming" from Unbound anthology (2015)
- "Not my Circus, Not my Monkeys" from Three Slices anthology (2015)

=== Dungeons & Dragons ===
- Ravenloft: Heir of Strahd (2025)

=== Star Wars ===
- Star Wars: "The Perfect Weapon" (short story, 2015) published in the trade paperback edition of the novelization of Star Wars: The Force Awakens, also available as an ebook
- Star Wars: "Scorched" (short story, 2016) published in Star Wars Insider No. 165
- Star Wars: Phasma (2017) part of the Journey to Star Wars: The Last Jedi promotional campaign
- Star Wars: "The Secrets of Long Snoot" (short story, 2017) published in Star Wars: From a Certain Point of View (2017)
- Star Wars: Galaxy's Edge: Black Spire (2019)
- Star Wars: The Skywalker Saga (2019)
- Star Wars: Return to a Shattered Planet (short story, 2020) published in the paperback edition of Star Wars: Galaxy's Edge: Black Spire
- Star Wars: "She Will Keep Them Warm" (short story, 2020) published in From a Certain Point of View: The Empire Strikes Back (2020)
- Star Wars: Inquisitor: Rise of the Red Blade (2023)

=== Young adult ===
- Servants of the Storm (2014)
- Hit (2015)
- Strike (2016)
- "The Greenest Grass" from Violent Ends anthology (2015)

=== Middle Grade ===
- Camp Scare (2022)

=== Short stories ===
- Catcall (2015)
- I Have Never Not Been an Object (2017)
- The Willows (2019)
- Blank Space (2023)
- Hi! I’m Claudia (2025)

==== Tie-in short stories ====
- Shadowman: "Follow Me Boy" (2013)
- "When Doves Cry" from Hellboy: An Assortment of Horrors anthology (2017)

=== Essays ===
- "On the Hulk: You Wouldn't Like Me When I'm Angry" from Last Night a Superhero Saved My Life anthology (2016)

=== Shadow series (as Lila Bowen) ===
- Wake of Vultures: The Shadow: Book One (2015)
- Conspiracy of Ravens: The Shadow: Book Two (2016)
- Malice of Crows: Book Three (2017)
- Treason of Hawks: Book Four (2018)

=== Tales of Pell (with Kevin Hearne) ===
- Kill the Farm Boy (Del Rey, July 17, 2018)
- No Country for Old Gnomes (Del Rey, April 16, 2019)
- The Princess Beard (2019)

=== Comics ===
- Ladycastle: #1–4 (BOOM! Studios, 2017)
- Adventure Time: #66–69 (2017)
- Rick and Morty Presents: Pickle Rick (2018)
- Firefly: The Sting (2019)
- Sparrowhawk (BOOM! Studios, 2018)
- Sleepy Hollow: The Witches of the Western Wood (IDW Publishing, 2026)

=== Erotica (as Ava Lovelace) ===
- The Lumberfox (2014)
