= Star Wars: Bloodline =

Star Wars novel by Claudia Gray

- Author: Claudia Gray
- Audio read by: January LaVoy
- Cover artist: Scott Biel
- Language: English
- Series: Journey to Star Wars: The Force Awakens
- Genre: Science fiction
- Publisher: Del Rey Books
- Publication date: May 3, 2016
- Publication place: United States
- Media type: Print (Hardcover)
- Pages: 352 (First edition, hardcover)
- ISBN: 978-0-345-51136-2 (First edition, hardcover)

Star Wars: Bloodline is a Star Wars novel by Claudia Gray, published by Del Rey Books on May 3, 2016. Set twenty-five years after the events of the 1983 film Return of the Jedi and six years before 2015's The Force Awakens, it follows Leia Organa as she navigates troubles brewing in the Galactic Senate.

The novel was announced in October 2015 at the New York Comic Con panel for the Journey to Star Wars: The Force Awakens publishing initiative with the title Star Wars: New Republic: Bloodline.

== Plot ==
Now in her late 40's, Senator Leia Organa is frustrated by the stagnation of the New Republic's Galactic Senate, which is troubled by inaction thanks to the rivalry of opposing factions. The Populists, including Leia, desire that individual planets be autonomous, while the Centrists support a centralized galactic government. Hearing allegations that the diminishing influence of the tyrannical Hutts has given rise to a dangerous cartel headed by the Nikto crime lord Rinnrivin Di, Leia races to the planet Bastatha to investigate. To her chagrin, she is accompanied by young Senator Ransolm Casterfo, a priggish Centrist with an idealized view of the fallen Galactic Empire. As she expected, Leia is abducted by Rinnrivin for a clandestine meeting, where she learns that many Niktos revere her as the "Huttslayer" for her killing of Jabba the Hutt decades before. During her escape, Leia and Casterfo find common ground, and soon determine that a shadowy greater power is behind Rinnrivin's expansive operation.

A motion passes in the Senate to potentially create a First Senator position with enhanced powers over the rest. Leia, the most likely Populist candidate, narrowly escapes a bombing. Casterfo and Leia's assistant Greer Sonnel discover a sizeable, well funded secret paramilitary organization calling themselves the Amaxines on the obscure planet Daxam IV. The seemingly frivolous Lady Carise Sindian, a Centrist senator from Arkanis, is actually an agent of the First Order, a clandestine organization made up of Imperial loyalists plotting to depose the New Republic and reclaim control of the galaxy. She learns the secret that Darth Vader was Leia's father, and uses it to sour Casterfo's growing trust in Leia. Feeling betrayed, Casterfo makes the secret public, which turns much of the Senate against Leia and effectively ends her candidacy. Leia leads Greer and the X-wing fighter pilot Joph Seastriker on a mission to infiltrate an Amaxine warrior base on the remote oceanic planet Sibensko, which Leia has connected to Rinnrivin as well. They discover a massive military force complete with ships and weapons, and Leia's husband Han Solo arrives just in time to aid in her escape. A firefight results in the destruction of the entire base, but Leia and her team flee with evidence that Rinnrivin and the Amaxines were indeed subordinate to a mysterious larger operation.

Leia presents her evidence to the Senate, and is supported by Casterfo. Furious, Carise and her faction frame him as a supporter of the Amaxines, and he is arrested for treason. Knowing Casterfo faces the death penalty on his home planet of Riosa but powerless to save him, Leia realizes that the Senate is too corrupt to be saved. She calls together some old friends—including Admiral Ackbar and Nien Nunb—as well as Greer, Joph and new "recruits" such as Snap Wexley and Dr. Kalonia to form the Resistance, an underground movement to investigate and fight against the forces amassing to threaten peace in the galaxy.

== Publication ==
With the 2012 acquisition of Lucasfilm by The Walt Disney Company, most of the licensed Star Wars novels and comics produced since the originating 1977 film Star Wars were rebranded as Star Wars Legends and declared non-canon to the franchise in April 2014. A new series of novels, aligned with the continuity of the films and the canon TV series The Clone Wars and Star Wars Rebels, began publication in September 2014. Bloodline was announced as Star Wars: New Republic: Bloodline in October 2015 at the New York Comic Con panel for the Journey to Star Wars: The Force Awakens publishing initiative. An excerpt was released on February 4, 2016, and the novel was published by Del Rey Books on May 3, 2016. Several key plot elements, including Leia being discredited after her identity as Darth Vader's daughter becomes public knowledge, originated with Michael Arndt during the early development of the then-untitled The Force Awakens film.

== Reception ==
Den of Geek gave a positive review and wrote: "While the writing isn't always as tightly constructed as in Claudia Gray's debut Star Wars novel, Lost Stars, Bloodline brings multidimensional new characters and a solid story." IGN concluded: "It's a fine summer read, light, airy, and sufficiently entertaining to keep readers interested as the story runs its course." Kirkus Reviews summarized: "Quite possibly one of the best Star Wars books I've read, certainly the best book of the new canon, Bloodline is everything I hoped it would be." GamesRadar+ commented: "Bloodline is a clumsy read at times [...] but it's a bright, devourable way of finding more out about the First Order."
