= Star Wars: The Last Jedi =

2017 film by Rian Johnson

- Theatrical release poster
- Directed by: Rian Johnson
- Written by: Rian Johnson
- Based on: Characters by George Lucas
- Produced by: Kathleen Kennedy; Ram Bergman
- Starring: Mark Hamill; Carrie Fisher; Adam Driver; Daisy Ridley; John Boyega; Oscar Isaac; Andy Serkis; Lupita Nyong'o; Domhnall Gleeson; Anthony Daniels; Gwendoline Christie; Kelly Marie Tran; Laura Dern; Benicio del Toro
- Cinematography: Steve Yedlin
- Edited by: Bob Ducsay
- Music by: John Williams
- Production company: Lucasfilm Ltd.
- Distributed by: Walt Disney Studios Motion Pictures
- Release dates: December 9, 2017 (Shrine Auditorium); December 15, 2017 (United States)
- Running time: 152 minutes
- Country: United States
- Language: English
- Budget: $414.6 million (gross); $343.2 million (net)
- Box office: $1.334 billion

Star Wars: The Last Jedi, also known as Star Wars: Episode VIII – The Last Jedi, is a 2017 American epic space opera film written and directed by Rian Johnson. Produced by Lucasfilm and distributed by Walt Disney Studios Motion Pictures, it is the second installment of the Star Wars sequel trilogy, following The Force Awakens (2015), and the eighth episode of the nine-part "Skywalker saga". The film's cast includes Mark Hamill, Carrie Fisher, Adam Driver, Daisy Ridley, John Boyega, Oscar Isaac, Andy Serkis, Lupita Nyong'o, Domhnall Gleeson, Anthony Daniels, Gwendoline Christie, Kelly Marie Tran, Laura Dern, and Benicio del Toro. The Last Jedi follows Rey as she seeks the aid of Luke Skywalker in hopes of turning the tide for the Resistance in the fight against Kylo Ren and the First Order while General Leia Organa, Finn, and Poe Dameron attempt to escape a First Order attack on the dwindling Resistance fleet. The film is dedicated to Fisher, who died in December 2016.

The Last Jedi is part of a new trilogy of films announced after Disney's acquisition of Lucasfilm in October 2012. It was produced by Lucasfilm president Kathleen Kennedy and Ram Bergman and executive produced by The Force Awakens director J. J. Abrams. John Williams, composer for the previous episodic films, returned to compose the score. A number of scenes were filmed at Skellig Michael in Ireland during pre-production in September 2015, but principal photography began at Pinewood Studios in England in February 2016 and wrapped that July.

The Last Jedi premiered in Los Angeles on December 9, 2017, and was released in the United States on December 15. It grossed $1.334 billion worldwide, becoming the highest-grossing film of 2017 and the ninth-highest-grossing film of all time by the time its theatrical run was over. It is also the second-highest-grossing Star Wars film and turned a net profit of $417 million. The film was critically acclaimed and received four nominations at the 90th Academy Awards, including Best Original Score and Best Visual Effects, as well as two nominations at the 71st British Academy Film Awards. A sequel, The Rise of Skywalker, concluded the sequel trilogy in 2019.

== Plot ==
Shortly after the Battle of Starkiller Base, (Note: As depicted in Star Wars: The Force Awakens (2015)) General Leia Organa and the Resistance are evacuating their base when the First Order fleet arrives. Against Leia's orders, Poe Dameron leads a costly counterattack that destroys a First Order dreadnought. The remaining Resistance escapes into hyperspace, but the First Order uses a device to track them and attacks again. Kylo Ren hesitates to fire on the lead Resistance ship after sensing his mother Leia's presence on board, but his wingmen destroy the bridge, killing most of the Resistance's leaders. Leia is dragged into space but survives by using the Force. While Leia recovers, Vice-Admiral Holdo assumes command of the Resistance. Running low on fuel, the remaining fleet is pursued by the First Order.

On Ahch-To, Rey attempts to recruit Luke Skywalker to the Resistance. Under self-imposed exile, Luke refuses to help, believing that the Jedi should end. After encouragement from R2-D2, he agrees to give Rey three lessons in the ways of the Force. During training, Rey and Kylo begin communicating through the Force, which puzzles them both. Kylo tells Rey that Luke feared his power; Luke confesses that he momentarily contemplated killing Kylo upon sensing that Snoke was corrupting him, which prompted Kylo to destroy Luke's new Jedi Order. Convinced that Kylo can be redeemed, Rey leaves Ahch-To. Luke prepares to burn the Jedi library but then hesitates. The spirit of Luke's master Yoda appears and destroys the library by summoning a bolt of lightning. He encourages Luke to learn from his failure.

Meanwhile, Poe entrusts Finn, mechanic Rose, and BB-8 with a secret mission to disable the First Order's tracking device. Maz Kanata directs them to the casino town of Canto Bight, where they meet the hacker DJ. Pursued by the local security, they escape Canto Bight with the help of stablehand children and racing animals they set free. Finn, Rose, and DJ infiltrate Snoke's flagship but are captured by Captain Phasma. Kylo brings Rey to Snoke, who claims that he connected their minds to discover Luke's whereabouts.

Holdo plans to evacuate the remaining members of the Resistance using small transport vessels. Believing her plan cowardly and futile, Poe leads a mutiny. A recovered Leia stuns Poe with a blaster and proceeds with the evacuation. Holdo remains aboard the ship as a decoy to mislead Snoke's fleet as the others flee to an abandoned base on Crait. DJ buys his freedom by revealing the Resistance's plan to General Hux, and the First Order fleet begins firing on the evacuation transports, destroying many.

Ordered to kill Rey, Kylo instead kills Snoke and they work together to defeat his Praetorian Guard. Rey hopes that Kylo has abandoned the dark side, but he instead asks her to rule the galaxy with him. Refusing, she battles him for control of Luke's lightsaber, bisecting the weapon. Holdo sacrifices herself by slicing through Snoke's flagship at lightspeed, crippling the First Order fleet. Rey escapes the destruction while Kylo declares himself Supreme Leader. BB-8 frees Finn and Rose; they fight and defeat Phasma and join the survivors on Crait. When the First Order arrives, Poe, Finn, and Rose attack with obsolete speeders. Rey and Chewbacca draw TIE fighters away in the Millennium Falcon, while Rose stops Finn from sacrificing himself. The First Order penetrates the Resistance fortress using a siege cannon.

Luke appears and confronts the First Order, allowing the surviving Resistance to escape. Kylo orders the First Order's forces to fire on Luke, but they fail to harm him. He then engages Luke in a lightsaber duel; upon striking Luke, Kylo realizes that Luke is not physically present but projecting his image through the Force. Rey helps the remaining Resistance escape on the Falcon. Exhausted, Luke dies peacefully on Ahch-To, becoming one with the Force. Rey and Leia sense his death, and Leia tells Rey that the Resistance can rise again.

At Canto Bight, the stablehands recount the story of Luke Skywalker; afterward, one of them moves a broom with the Force and gazes into space.

== Cast ==
- Mark Hamill as Luke Skywalker, a powerful Jedi Master who has been in self-imposed exile on the planet Ahch-To.
  - Hamill voices Dobbu Scay, named after the film's editor, Bob Ducsay. On Canto Bight, the character mistakes BB-8 for a slot machine.
- Carrie Fisher as General Leia Organa, twin sister to Luke, former princess of Alderaan, and a leading general in the Resistance.
- Adam Driver as Kylo Ren, Supreme Leader Snoke's disciple, who is strong with the Force. He is the son of Han Solo and Leia Organa, and Luke's nephew.
- Daisy Ridley as Rey, a highly Force-sensitive scavenger from the desert planet Jakku who joined the Resistance and goes to find Luke
- John Boyega as Finn, a former stormtrooper of the First Order who defected to the Resistance.
- Oscar Isaac as Poe Dameron, a high-ranking X-wing fighter pilot in the Resistance.
- Andy Serkis as Supreme Leader Snoke, the leader of the First Order and Kylo Ren's master.
- Lupita Nyong'o as Maz Kanata, a pirate and ally of the Resistance.
- Domhnall Gleeson as General Hux, the former head of the First Order's Starkiller Base.
- Anthony Daniels as C-3PO, a humanoid protocol droid in the service of Leia Organa.
- Gwendoline Christie as Captain Phasma, the commander of the First Order's stormtroopers.
- Kelly Marie Tran as Rose Tico, a member of the Resistance who works in maintenance.
- Laura Dern as Vice-Admiral Amilyn Holdo, an officer in the Resistance.
- Benicio del Toro as DJ, an underworld codebreaker.

Frank Oz returns as Yoda, the deceased former Jedi Master and Luke's wise mentor, who appears as a Force spirit. Joonas Suotamo appears as Chewbacca, taking over the role from Peter Mayhew after previously serving as his body double in The Force Awakens. Mayhew, who suffered from chronic knee and back pain, was credited as "Chewbacca consultant". Billie Lourd, Mike Quinn, and Timothy D. Rose reprise their roles as Lieutenant Connix, Nien Nunb, and Admiral Ackbar, respectively; with Tom Kane voicing Ackbar. Amanda Lawrence appears as Commander D'Acy, and Mark Lewis Jones and Adrian Edmondson play Captains Canady and Peavey, respectively. BB-8 is controlled by puppeteers Dave Chapman and Brian Herring, with initial voice work by Ben Schwartz and final sound effects voiced by Bill Hader modulated through a synthesizer. Jimmy Vee portrays R2-D2, taking over the role from Kenny Baker, who died in August 2016. Veronica Ngo portrays Rose's sister Paige Tico, a Resistance gunner who sacrifices her life to destroy a First Order dreadnought.

Justin Theroux plays the master codebreaker, while Lily Cole plays his companion. Joseph Gordon-Levitt has a voice cameo as Slowen Lo, and Warwick Davis plays Wodibin. Rogue One (2016) director Gareth Edwards has a cameo appearance as a Resistance Soldier, with Edgar Wright and Joe Cornish also cameo in the film. Hermione Corfield appears as Tallissan "Tallie" Lintra, a Resistance A-Wing pilot and squadron leader, and Noah Segan and Jamie Christopher appear as Resistance pilots Starck and Tubbs. Hugh Skinner cameos as a Resistance Officer; while Hamill's children, Griffin, Nathan, and Chelsea, cameo as Resistance soldiers. Prince William, Duke of Cambridge; Prince Harry, Duke of Sussex; and Gary Barlow have cameo appearances as stormtroopers, and Tom Hardy also had an appearance as a stormtrooper, but his cameo was dropped from the final cut.

== Production ==
=== Development ===
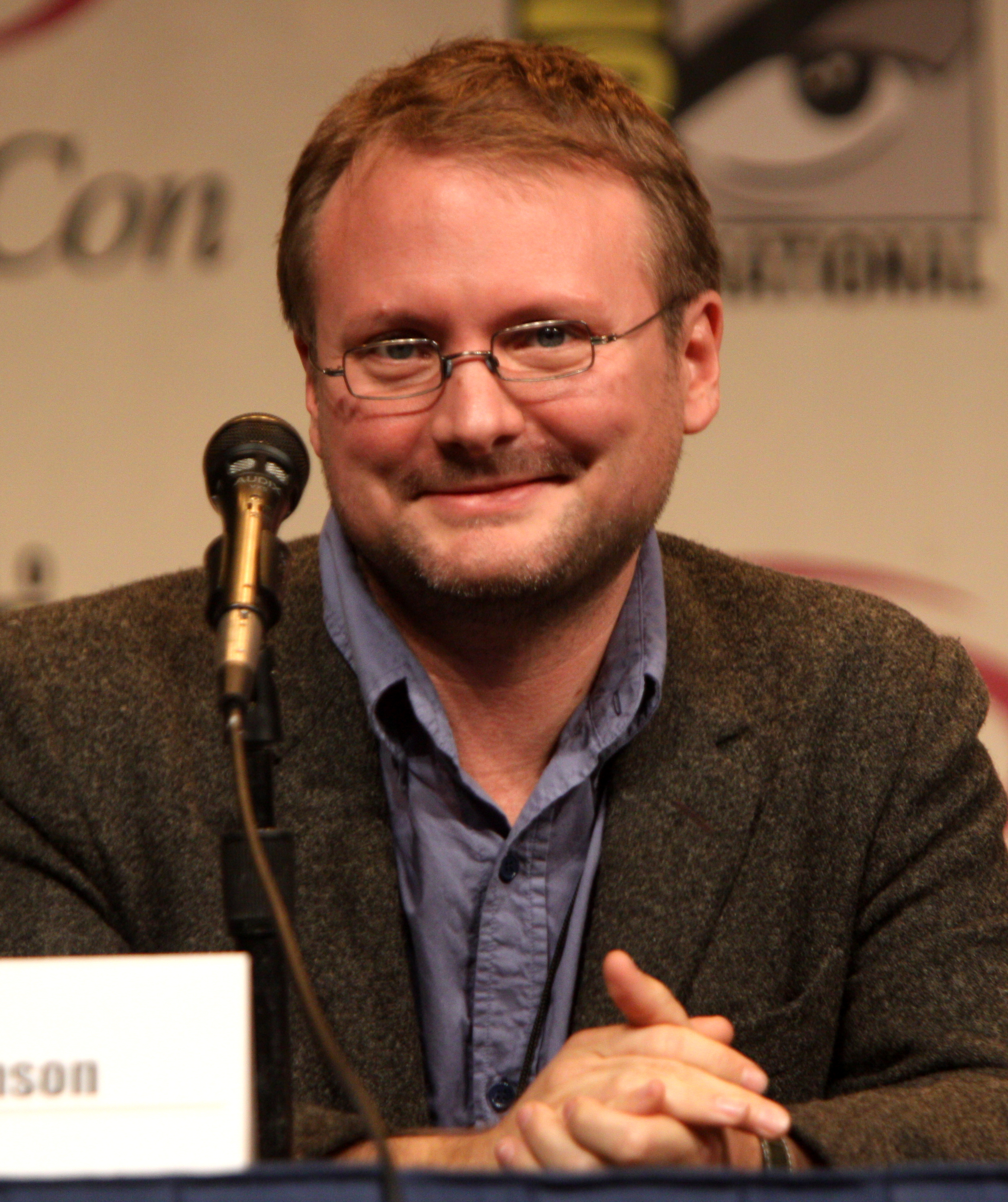
Writer and director Rian Johnson

In October 2012, Star Wars creator George Lucas sold his production company Lucasfilm to the Walt Disney Company. Disney announced a new trilogy of Star Wars films. J. J. Abrams was named director of the first episode in the trilogy, Star Wars: The Force Awakens, in January 2013. In June 2014, director Rian Johnson was reported to be in talks to write and direct its sequel, Episode VIII, and to write a treatment for the third film, Episode IX, with Ram Bergman producing both films. Johnson confirmed in August that he would direct Episode VIII.

In January 2015, Disney CEO Bob Iger stated that Episode VIII would be released in 2017. In December, Lucasfilm president Kathleen Kennedy said that the film had not been mapped out and that Abrams was collaborating with Johnson, who would in turn work with (then) Episode IX director Colin Trevorrow to ensure a smooth transition. Additionally, Abrams served as an executive producer along with Tom Karnowski and Jason McGatlin. In January 2017, Lucasfilm announced the title for Episode VIII as Star Wars: The Last Jedi.

=== Writing ===
The Last Jedi begins immediately after The Force Awakens. Johnson had his story group watch films such as Twelve O'Clock High (1949), The Bridge on the River Kwai (1957), Gunga Din (1939), Three Outlaw Samurai (1964), Sahara (1943), and Letter Never Sent (1960) for inspiration while developing ideas. He felt it was difficult to work on the film while The Force Awakens was being finished.

Johnson wrote the scene with the mirrored versions of Rey to symbolize her search for identity; when she asks for a vision of her parents, she sees only herself. Rey learns that her parents were "nobodies" because it would be "the hardest thing" she and the audience could hear; Johnson likened the scene to Luke Skywalker learning that Darth Vader is his father in The Empire Strikes Back (1980). During production, Hamill expressed disagreement with the direction of his character, Luke, feeling his disillusioned state was at odds with the character. Hamill later said he regretted making his initial misgivings public and compared his disagreements to his clashes with George Lucas during the filming of Return of the Jedi (1983).

=== Casting ===
In September 2015, Disney shortlisted the female cast members to Gina Rodriguez, Tatiana Maslany, and Olivia Cooke. That same month, Benicio del Toro confirmed his involvement in the film, but denied that he was playing a villain, and Mark Hamill was also confirmed. Joaquin Phoenix was also courted to portray the role of DJ, but would end up passing on the offer. In October 2015, Gugu Mbatha-Raw was rumored to have been cast in the film. In November, Kennedy announced at the London premiere of The Force Awakens that the entire cast would return for Episode VIII, along with "a handful" of new cast members. In February 2016, at the start of filming, it was confirmed that Laura Dern and Kelly Marie Tran had been cast in undisclosed roles. In April 2017, at the Star Wars Celebration Orlando, Lucasfilm announced that Tran would play Resistance maintenance worker Rose Tico, which Johnson described as the film's largest new role. To keep Frank Oz's return as Yoda a secret, producers excluded Oz's name in the billing for the film's pre-release marketing and ensured that Oz stayed on set during filming.

=== Filming ===
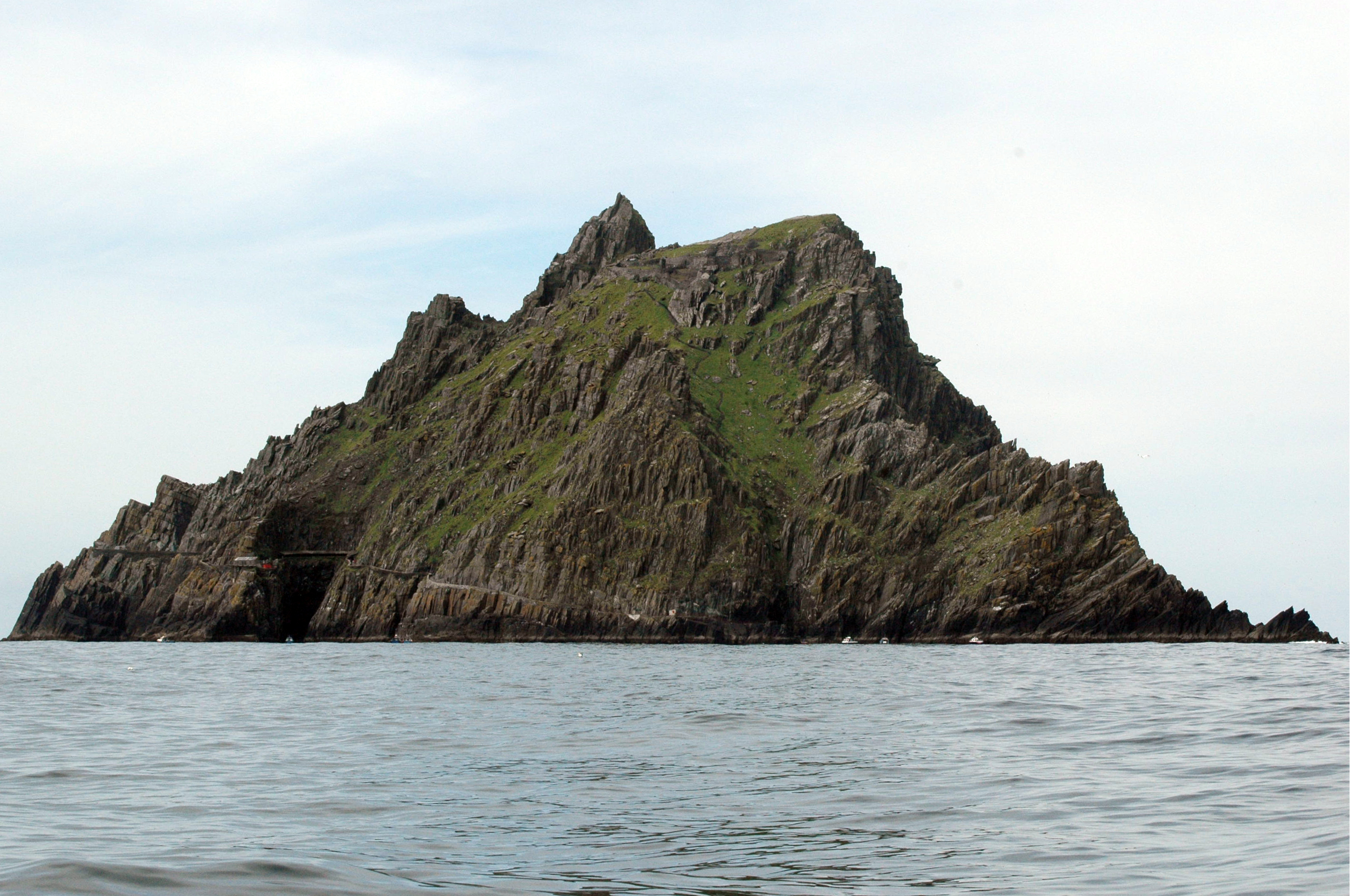
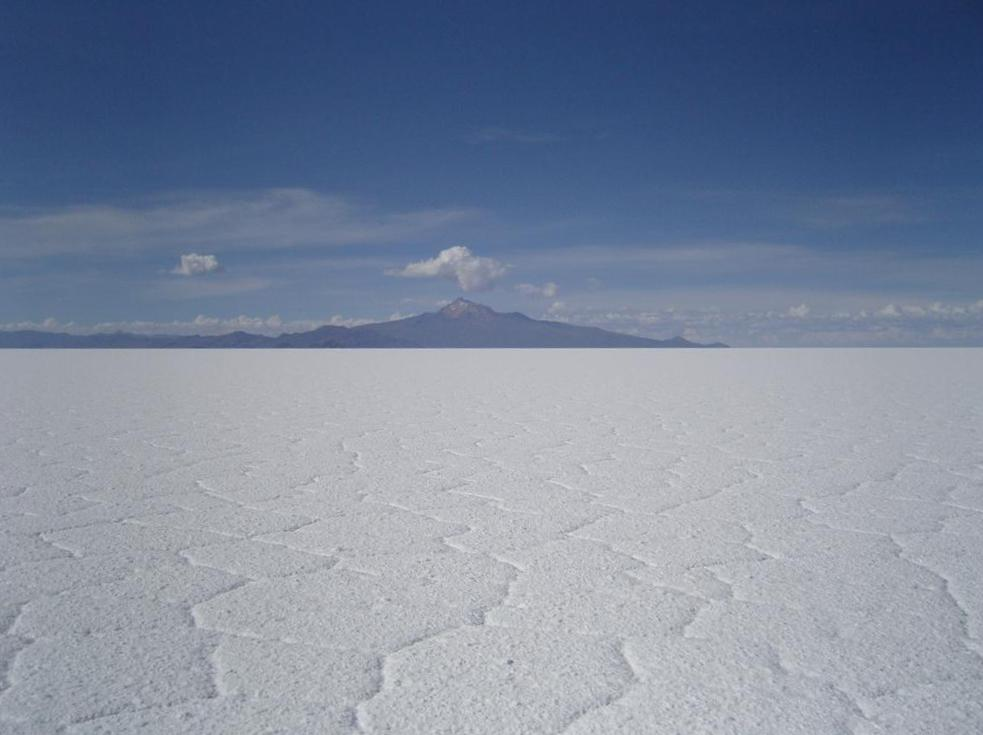
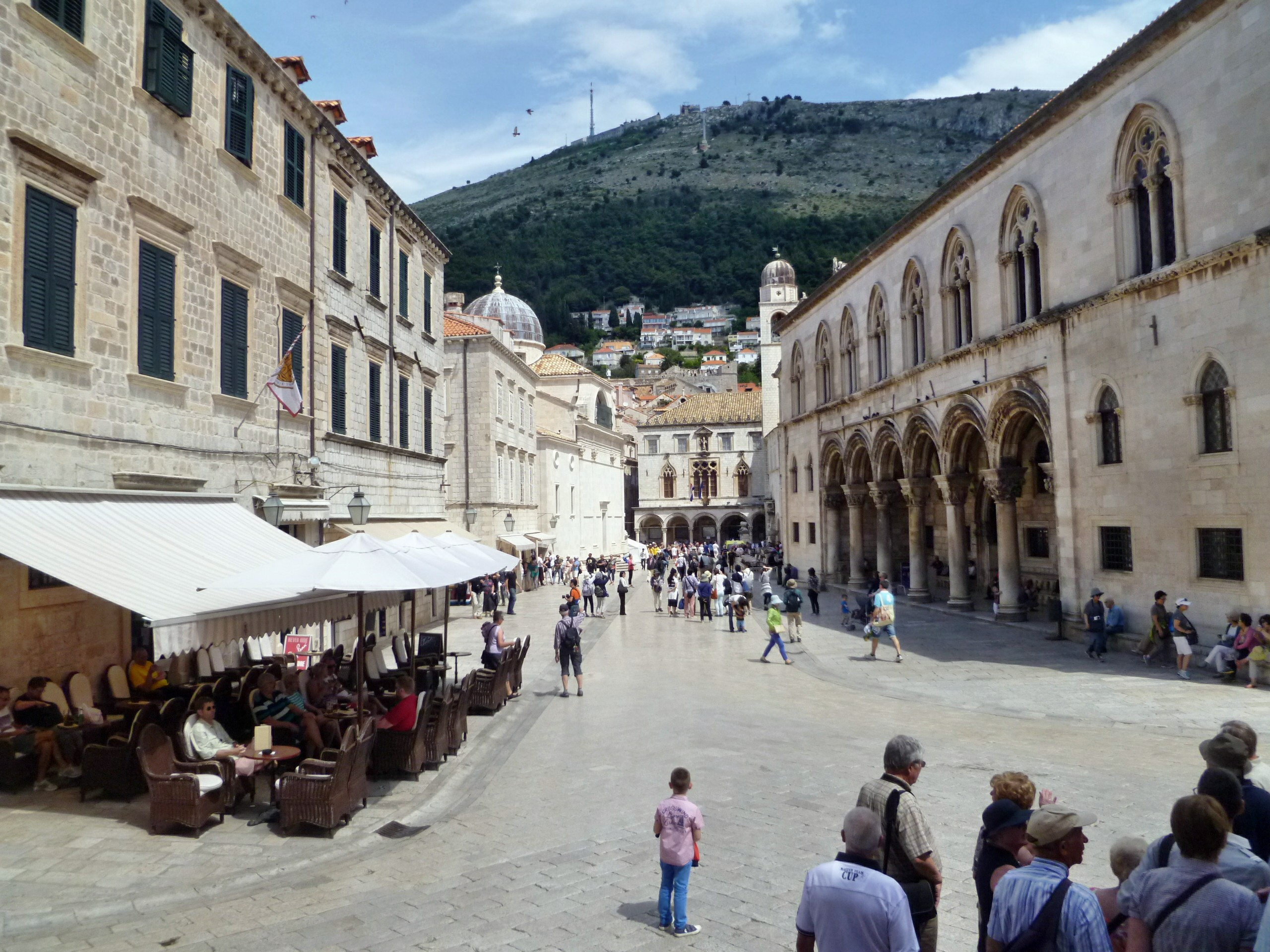
Some filming locations: The island of Skellig Michael in Ireland (top), Salar de Uyuni, a salt flat in Bolivia (middle), and the city of Dubrovnik, in Croatia (bottom)

Second unit photography began during pre-production at Skellig Michael in Ireland on September 14, 2015, due to the difficulties of filming at that location during other seasons. It would have lasted five days, but filming was canceled for the first day due to poor weather and rough conditions. In September 2015, del Toro revealed that principal photography would begin in March 2016. The production began work on the 007 Stage at Pinewood Studios on November 15, 2015. Rick Heinrichs served as production designer.

In January 2016, production of Episode VIII was delayed until February due to script rewrites. Filming was in danger of being delayed further due to an upcoming strike between the Producers Alliance for Cinema and Television and the Broadcasting, Entertainment, Cinematograph and Theatre Union. On February 10, 2016, Disney CEO Bob Iger confirmed that principal photography had begun under the working title Space Bear. Additional filming took place in Dubrovnik, Croatia from March 9 to 16, as well as in Ireland in May. Malin Head in County Donegal and a mountain headland, Ceann Sibeal in County Kerry, served as additional filming locations. To increase the scenes' intimacy Driver and Ridley were both present when filming Kylo and Rey's Force visions. Location filming for the battle scenes on the planet Crait took place at the Salar de Uyuni salt flats in Bolivia. Additional filming took place in Mexico.

Principal photography wrapped on July 22, 2016, though as of early September, Nyong'o had not filmed her scenes. In February 2017, it was announced that sequences from the film were shot in IMAX. Production designer Rick Heinrichs said the original script called for 160 sets, double what might be expected, but that Johnson did some "trimming and cutting". Ultimately, 125 sets were created on 14 sound stages at Pinewood Studios.

According to creature designer Neal Scanlan, The Last Jedi has more practical effects than any Star Wars film, with 180 to 200 creatures created with practical effects, some cut from the final edit. For Yoda's appearance in the film as a Force ghost, the character was created using puppetry, as was done in the original Star Wars trilogy (as opposed to computer-generated imagery, which was used to create Yoda in most of the prequel trilogy). Rian Johnson explained the decision was because he felt a digital Yoda would not have been true to how Luke knew him in The Empire Strikes Back.

=== Music ===
In July 2013, Kennedy confirmed at the Star Wars Celebration Europe that John Williams would return to score the Star Wars sequel trilogy. Williams confirmed his assignment for The Last Jedi at a Tanglewood concert in August 2016, stating he would begin recording the score "off and on" in December 2016 until March or April 2017. On February 21, 2017, it was confirmed that recording was underway, with both Williams and William Ross conducting the sessions. In lieu of a traditional spotting session with Johnson, Williams was provided a temp track of music from his previous film scores as a reference for scoring The Last Jedi. The official soundtrack album was released by Walt Disney Records on December 15, 2017.

== Marketing ==
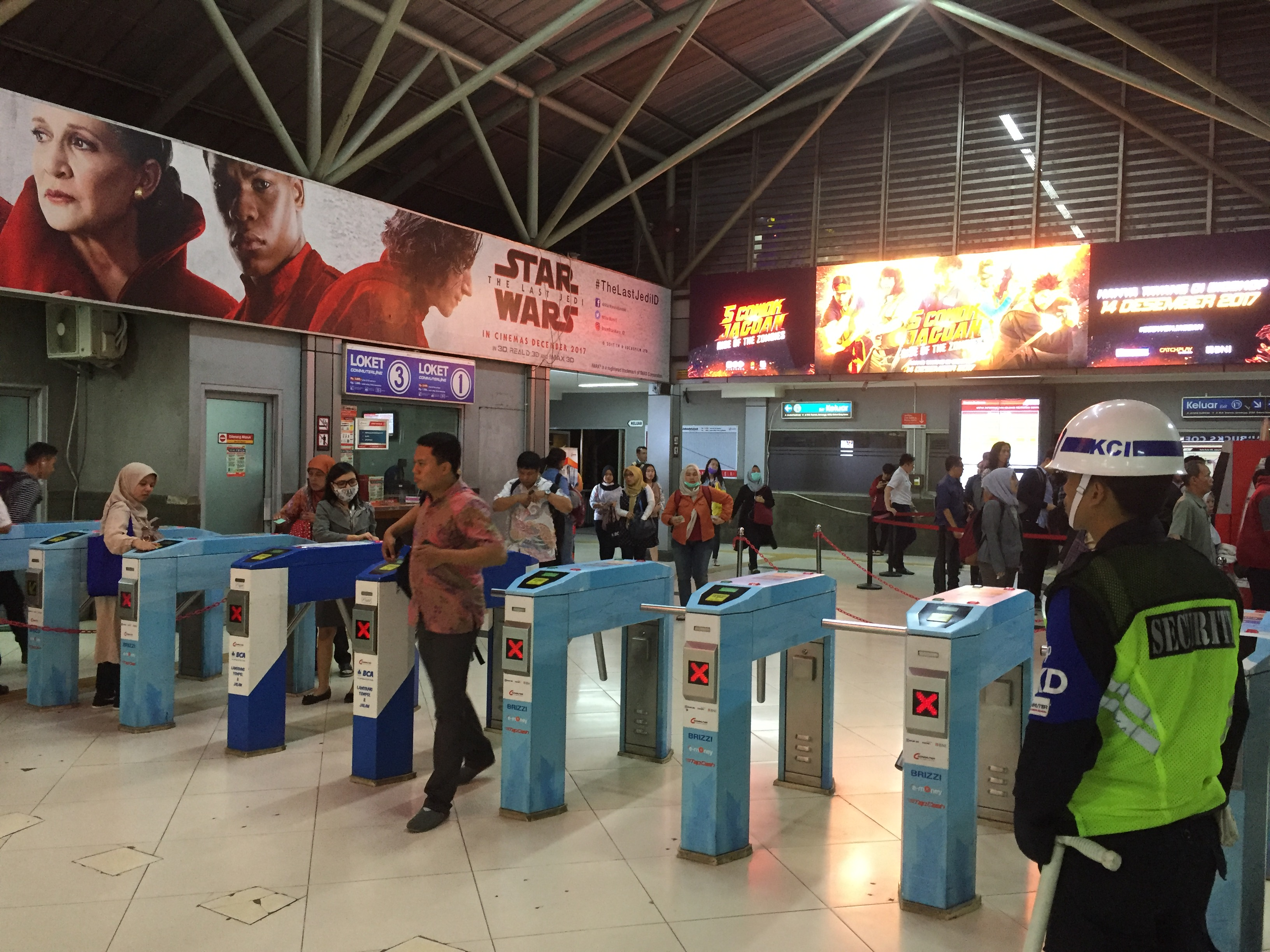
The advertisement of the film (left) at the Sudirman railway station in Jakarta, Indonesia

On September 19, 2017, Australia Post released a set of stamp packs. On October 12, Royal Mail released a set of eight promotional postage stamps designed by Malcolm Tween. Several tie-in books were released on the same day as the film's release, including The Last Jedi: The Visual Dictionary, and various children's reading and activity books. Related novelizations included the prequel book Cobalt Squadron, and Canto Bight, a collection of novellas about the Canto Bight Casino. As with The Force Awakens, there is no official tie-in game for The Last Jedi, in favor of integrating content from the film into other Star Wars video games, including Star Wars Battlefront II, which introduced various content from the film, during the game's first "season".

== Release ==
=== Theatrical ===
The film had its world premiere at the Shrine Auditorium in Los Angeles on December 9, 2017, and was released in the United States on December 15, in IMAX and 3D. The film was originally scheduled to be released in the United States on May 26; however, it was pushed back to December to avoid competition with Pirates of the Caribbean: Dead Men Tell No Tales (2017).

=== Home media ===
Walt Disney Studios Home Entertainment released Star Wars: The Last Jedi digitally in HD and 4K via digital download and Movies Anywhere on March 13, 2018, with an Ultra HD Blu-ray, Blu-ray, and DVD physical release on March 27. On March 31, 2020, a 27-disc Skywalker Saga box set was released, containing all nine films in the series, with each film receiving three discs, a Blu-ray version, a 4K Ultra HD Blu-ray, and special features found on the 2011 release for the first six episodic films.

== Reception ==
=== Box office ===
Star Wars: The Last Jedi grossed $620.2 million in the United States and Canada, and $712.5 million in other territories, for a worldwide total of $1.333 billion. It was the highest-grossing film of 2017 and the ninth-highest-grossing film of all time. The film had a worldwide opening of $450.8 million, the eighth-biggest of all time, including $40.6 million that was attributed to IMAX screenings, the second biggest for IMAX. It was estimated that the film would need to gross $800 million worldwide to break even; On December 31, 2017, the film crossed the $1 billion mark, making it the third Star Wars film to do so. Deadline Hollywood calculated the film's net profit as $417.5 million, accounting for production budgets, marketing, talent participations, and other costs; box office grosses and home media revenues placed it first on their list of 2017's "Most Valuable Blockbusters".

==== United States and Canada ====
Pre-sale tickets went on sale in the United States on October 9, 2017, and as with The Force Awakens and Rogue One, ticket service sites such as Fandango had their servers crash due to heavy traffic and demand. In the United States and Canada, industry tracking had The Last Jedi grossing around $200 million from 4,232 theaters in its opening weekend. The film made $45 million from Thursday night previews, the second-highest amount ever (behind The Force Awakens' $57 million). It went on to make $104.8 million on its first day (including previews), and $220 million over the weekend, both the second-highest amounts of all time. The opening weekend figure included an IMAX opening-weekend of $25 million, the biggest IMAX opening of the year, and the second biggest ever behind The Force Awakens.

After dropping by 76% on its second Friday, the worst Friday-to-Friday drop in the series, the film fell by a total of 67% in its second weekend, grossing $71.7 million. It was the largest second-weekend drop of the series, although it remained atop the box office. It made $52.4 million in its third weekend, again topping the box office. It also brought its domestic total to $517.1 million, overtaking the Disney film Beauty and the Beast (2017) as the highest of 2017. It grossed $23.6 million and was surpassed the following weekend by Jumanji: Welcome to the Jungle (2017) (which was in its third week) and Insidious: The Last Key (2018).

==== Other countries ====
In its first two days of release the film made $60.8 million from 48 markets. The top countries were the United Kingdom ($10.2 million), Germany ($6.1 million), France ($6 million), Australia ($5.6 million), and Brazil ($2.5 million). By the end of the weekend, the film made $230 million outside the United States and Canada. All-time opening weekend records were set in various countries, including France, Germany, Spain, United Kingdom, and Finland. On its second weekend, it grossed $76.1 million outside the United States and Canada and became the fourth-highest-grossing film of the year in Europe. As of January 21, the largest markets outside of the United States and Canada are the United Kingdom ($109.3 million), Germany ($79.8 million), France ($63.5 million), Japan ($60.8 million), and Australia ($43.5 million).

The film had a $28.7 million opening weekend in China. A week after its debut, China's movie exhibitors dropped the film's showtimes by 90%. The film grossed $910,000 in its third weekend, dropping to ninth place at the Chinese box office, overshadowed by new releases including Bollywood film Secret Superstar (2017), Hollywood films Ferdinand (2017) and Wonder (2017), and Chinese film A Better Tomorrow 2018. The Last Jedi grossed $42.5 million in China.

=== Critical response ===
The film was critically acclaimed. On the review aggregator website Rotten Tomatoes, 91% of 483 critics' reviews are positive, with an average rating of 8.1/10. The website's consensus reads: "Star Wars: The Last Jedi honors the saga's rich legacy while adding some surprising twists—and delivering all the emotion-rich action fans could hope for." Metacritic, which uses a weighted average, assigned the film a score of 84 out of 100, based on 56 critics, indicating "universal acclaim". Metacritic analysis found the film was the 25th-most mentioned film on "best of the year" film rankings and the 22nd-most mentioned on "best of the decade" film rankings.

Matt Zoller Seitz of RogerEbert.com gave the film four stars out of four, praising the surprises and risks that it took, writing that "The movie works equally well as an earnest adventure full of passionate heroes and villains and a meditation on sequels and franchise properties", in which the film "includes multiple debates over whether one should replicate or reject the stories and symbols of the past." Writing for Rolling Stone, Peter Travers gave the film three-and-a-half stars out of four, praising Johnson's direction and the cast performances, particularly Hamill's, and concluding that the film "ranks with the very best Star Wars epics (even the pinnacle that is The Empire Strikes Back)". Richard Roeper of the Chicago Sun-Times gave the film three-and-a-half stars out of four, praising the action sequences and humor, and said that the film "doesn't pack quite the same emotional punch [as The Force Awakens] and it lags a bit in the second half, [but] this is still a worthy chapter in the Star Wars franchise", containing a few callbacks of "previous characters and iconic moments".

Will Gompertz, arts editor of BBC News, gave the film four stars out of five, writing "Rian Johnson [...] has not ruined your Christmas with a turkey. His gift to you is a cracker, a blockbuster movie packed with invention, wit, and action galore." The unpredictability of the plot was appreciated by reviewers such as Alex Leadbeater of Screen Rant, who commented specifically that the death of Snoke was "the best movie twist in years".

Conversely, Richard Brody of The New Yorker wrote that the film "comes off as a work that's ironed out, flattened down, appallingly purified". Kate Taylor of The Globe and Mail gave the film two stars out of four, saying it suffered from too many new additions and adding, "as it seeks to uphold a giant cultural legacy, this unfolding trilogy struggles to maintain a balance that often seems just out of reach." Owen Gleiberman of Variety criticized the film for being too derivative of the past films, noting "it's now repeating things that have already been repeated", becoming "an official monument to nostalgia".

George Lucas, who was not involved with the film's production, described The Last Jedi as "beautifully made" shortly after its release. His reaction to Star Wars: The Force Awakens was generally more negative.

=== Audience reception ===
Audience reception measured by scientific polling methods was highly positive. Audiences polled by CinemaScore during the opening weekend gave the film an average grade of "A" on an A+ to F scale, and those at PostTrak gave the film an 89% overall positive score, a 79% "definite recommend", and a rare five-star rating. SurveyMonkey determined that 89% of its polled audience graded the film positively.

User-generated scores at Rotten Tomatoes and Metacritic received considerable coverage for being more negative. Audience scores on such sites require only registration and do not ensure that contributing voters have seen the film. Several reviewers speculated that coordinated vote brigading from internet groups and bots contributed to the low scores, including analysis provided by Quartz and Bleeding Cool. After initially rejecting tampering claims, Rotten Tomatoes later said in 2019 that The Last Jedi had been "seriously targeted" by a review-bombing campaign. Scott Mendelson of Forbes labeled the negative reaction "alleged", saying it was based on "easily trolled online user polls", and he criticized Disney for placating the "vocal minority" in its approach to the sequel, The Rise of Skywalker.

The Last Jedi was also characterized by reviewers as divisive among audiences. Emily St. James of Vox found that dissatisfied fans saw the film as too progressive, disliked its humor, plot, or character arcs, or felt betrayed that it ignored fan theories. Other reviewers made similar observations. Particularly divisive was the reveal that Rey's parents are insignificant; many fans had expected her to be Luke's daughter or to share a lineage with another character from the original trilogy. There was also sentiment that Snoke's character was underdeveloped and that Luke's actions contradicted his previous heroic portrayal. Reviewers claimed that fan theories were held so strongly among some viewers that it was difficult for them to accept different stories, but they noted that other viewers appreciated the film's action, tone, and deviation from Star Wars tradition.

==== Harassment ====
The casting of Asian-American actress Kelly Marie Tran as Rose Tico spurred both a racist and misogynistic backlash against the film, including sexist and racist commentary about both Tran and her character. Tran was accused of representing "forced diversity" imposed by "social justice warriors" because of her race. After facing extensive harassment over her ethnicity and appearance, Tran quit social media. Tran was the first woman of color to have a lead role in a Star Wars film, and similarly John Boyega faced the same type of abuse when he was cast in The Force Awakens. After leaving social media, director Rian Johnson and co-stars Mark Hamill and John Boyega defended Tran against the harassment she received. There was also criticism directed at the overall ethnic and gender diversity featured in The Last Jedi.

=== Accolades ===
Accolades received by Star Wars: The Last Jedi
Award	Date of ceremony	Category	Recipient(s)	Result	Ref.
AARP Movies for Grownups Awards	February 5, 2018	Best Movie for Grownups	Star Wars: The Last Jedi	Won	
AARP Movies for Grownups Awards	February 5, 2018	Readers' Choice Poll	Star Wars: The Last Jedi	Nominated	
Academy Awards	March 4, 2018	Best Original Score	John Williams	Nominated	
Academy Awards	March 4, 2018	Best Sound Editing	Matthew Wood and Ren Klyce	Nominated	
Academy Awards	March 4, 2018	Best Sound Mixing	David Parker, Michael Semanick, Ren Klyce, and Stuart Wilson	Nominated	
Academy Awards	March 4, 2018	Best Visual Effects	Ben Morris, Mike Mulholland, Neal Scanlan, and Chris Corbould	Nominated	
Art Directors Guild Awards	January 27, 2018	Excellence in Production Design for a Fantasy Film	Rick Heinrichs	Nominated	
BET Awards	June 24, 2018	Best Actress	Lupita Nyong'o	Nominated	
BMI Film & TV Awards	May 9, 2018	BMI Film Music Awards	John Williams	Won	
British Academy Film Awards	February 18, 2018	Best Sound	Ren Klyce, David Parker, Michael Semanick, Stuart Wilson, and Matthew Wood	Nominated	
British Academy Film Awards	February 18, 2018	Best Special Visual Effects	Stephen Alpin, Chris Corbould, Ben Morris, and Neal Scanlan	Nominated	
Cinema Audio Society Awards	February 24, 2018	Outstanding Achievement in Sound Mixing in a Motion Picture – Live Action	Stuart Wilson, David Parker, Michael Semanick, Ren Klyce, Shawn Murphy, Doc Kane, and Frank Rinella	Nominated	
Costume Designers Guild Awards	February 20, 2018	Excellence in Sci-Fi/Fantasy Film	Michael Kaplan	Nominated	
Empire Awards	March 18, 2018	Best Film	Star Wars: The Last Jedi	Won	
Empire Awards	March 18, 2018	Best Director	Rian Johnson	Won	
Empire Awards	March 18, 2018	Best Actor	John Boyega	Nominated	
Empire Awards	March 18, 2018	Best Actress	Daisy Ridley	Won	
Empire Awards	March 18, 2018	Best Female Newcomer	Kelly Marie Tran	Nominated	
Empire Awards	March 18, 2018	Best Sci-Fi/Fantasy Film	Star Wars: The Last Jedi	Nominated	
Empire Awards	March 18, 2018	Best Production Design	Star Wars: The Last Jedi	Nominated	
Empire Awards	March 18, 2018	Best Visual Effects	Star Wars: The Last Jedi	Won	
Empire Awards	March 18, 2018	Best Costume Design	Michael Kaplan	Won	
Florida Film Critics Circle Awards	December 23, 2017	Best Visual Effects	Star Wars: The Last Jedi	Nominated	
Georgia Film Critics Association Awards	January 12, 2018	Best Production Design	Rick Heinrichs	Nominated	
Golden Reel Awards	February 18, 2018	Outstanding Achievement in Sound Editing – Sound Effects and Foley for Feature Film	Matthew Wood, Ren Klyce, Steve Orlando, Frank Rinella, Coya Elliot, Bonnie Wild, Jon Borland, Kim Patrick, Dee Selby, Ronni Brown, and Margie O'Malley	Nominated	
Golden Trailer Awards	June 6, 2017	Best Fantasy/Adventure Poster	"Teaser" (Lindeman & Associates)	Won	
Golden Trailer Awards	May 31, 2018	Best Fantasy Adventure	"Rebellion Reborn DCM Trailer" (Tiny Hero)	Nominated	
Golden Trailer Awards	May 31, 2018	Best Sound Editing	"Rebellion Reborn DCM Trailer" (Tiny Hero)	Nominated	
Golden Trailer Awards	May 31, 2018	Best Sound Editing in a TV Spot (for a Feature Film)	"It's Time" (Trailer Park, Inc.)	Nominated	
Golden Trailer Awards	May 31, 2018	Best Fantasy / Adventure Poster	Star Wars: The Last Jedi (BOND)	Nominated	
Grammy Awards	February 10, 2019	Best Score Soundtrack for Visual Media	John Williams	Nominated	
Hugo Awards	August 19, 2018	Best Dramatic Presentation, Long Form	Rian Johnson	Nominated	
International Film Music Critics Association Awards	February 22, 2018	Film Score of the Year	John Williams	Nominated	
International Film Music Critics Association Awards	February 22, 2018	Best Original Score for a Fantasy/Science Fiction/Horror Film	John Williams	Nominated	
International Film Music Critics Association Awards	February 22, 2018	Film Music Composition of the Year	John Williams for "Finale"	Nominated	
London Film Critics' Circle Awards	January 28, 2018	Technical Achievement Award	Ben Morris (visual effects)	Nominated	
Make-Up Artists and Hair Stylists Guild Awards	February 24, 2018	Best Special Make-Up Effects in a Feature-Length Motion Picture	Peter Swords King and Neal Scanlan	Nominated	
MTV Movie & TV Awards	June 18, 2018	Best Performance in a Movie	Daisy Ridley	Nominated	
MTV Movie & TV Awards	June 18, 2018	Best Hero	Daisy Ridley	Nominated	
MTV Movie & TV Awards	June 18, 2018	Best Villain	Adam Driver	Nominated	
Nebula Awards	May 19, 2018	Ray Bradbury Nebula Award for Outstanding Dramatic Presentation	Rian Johnson	Nominated	
Nickelodeon Kids' Choice Awards	March 24, 2018	Favorite Movie	Star Wars: The Last Jedi	Nominated	
Nickelodeon Kids' Choice Awards	March 24, 2018	Favorite Movie Actress	Daisy Ridley	Nominated	
Saturn Awards	June 27, 2018	Best Science Fiction Film	Star Wars: The Last Jedi	Nominated	
Saturn Awards	June 27, 2018	Best Actor	Mark Hamill	Won	
Saturn Awards	June 27, 2018	Best Actress	Daisy Ridley	Nominated	
Saturn Awards	June 27, 2018	Best Supporting Actress	Carrie Fisher	Nominated	
Saturn Awards	June 27, 2018	Best Supporting Actress	Kelly Marie Tran	Nominated	
Saturn Awards	June 27, 2018	Best Director	Rian Johnson	Nominated	
Saturn Awards	June 27, 2018	Best Screenplay	Rian Johnson	Won	
Saturn Awards	June 27, 2018	Best Production Design	Rick Heinrichs	Nominated	
Saturn Awards	June 27, 2018	Best Editing	Bob Ducsay	Won	
Saturn Awards	June 27, 2018	Best Music	John Williams	Nominated	
Saturn Awards	June 27, 2018	Best Costume Design	Michael Kaplan	Nominated	
Saturn Awards	June 27, 2018	Best Makeup	Peter Swords King and Neal Scanlan	Nominated	
Saturn Awards	June 27, 2018	Best Film Special / Visual Effects	Ben Morris, Mike Mulholland, Chris Corbould, and Neal Scanlan	Nominated	
Teen Choice Awards	August 12, 2018	Choice Fantasy Actress	Carrie Fisher	Won	
Teen Choice Awards	August 12, 2018	Choice Fantasy Actress	Daisy Ridley	Nominated	
Teen Choice Awards	August 12, 2018	Choice Fantasy Actor	John Boyega	Nominated	
Teen Choice Awards	August 12, 2018	Choice Fantasy Actor	Mark Hamill	Nominated	
Teen Choice Awards	August 12, 2018	Choice Fantasy Actor	Oscar Isaac	Nominated	
Teen Choice Awards	August 12, 2018	Choice Fantasy Movie	Star Wars: The Last Jedi	Nominated	
Teen Choice Awards	August 12, 2018	Choice Villain	Adam Driver	Nominated	
Teen Choice Awards	August 12, 2018	Choice Breakout Movie Star	Kelly Marie Tran	Nominated	
Teen Choice Awards	August 12, 2018	Choice Hissy Fit	Adam Driver	Nominated	
Visual Effects Society Awards	February 13, 2018	Outstanding Visual Effects in a Photoreal Feature	Ben Morris, Tim Keene, Eddie Pasquarello, Daniel Seddon, and Chris Corbould	Nominated	
Visual Effects Society Awards	February 13, 2018	Outstanding Virtual Cinematography in a CG Project	Cameron Nielsen, Albert Cheng, John Levin, and Johanes Kurnia for "Crait Surface Battle"	Nominated	
Visual Effects Society Awards	February 13, 2018	Outstanding Effects Simulations in a Photoreal Feature	Peter Kyme, Miguel Perez Senet, Ahmed Gharraph, and Billy Copley for "Bombing Run"	Nominated	
Visual Effects Society Awards	February 13, 2018	Outstanding Effects Simulations in a Photoreal Feature	Mihai Cioroba, Ryoji Fujita, Jiyong Shin, and Dan Finnegan for "Mega Destroyer Destruction"	Nominated	
World Soundtrack Awards	October 17, 2018	Soundtrack Composer of the Year	John Williams	Nominated	

== Sequel ==
The Last Jedi was followed by The Rise of Skywalker, the conclusion of the sequel trilogy. Despite a mixed critical reception, The Rise of Skywalker was a financial success.
