= First Order (Star Wars) =

Fictional military power in the Star Wars franchise

- Star Wars organization
- Emblem and Flag of the First Order

In-universe information
- Type: Neo-Imperialist military movement, separatist rump state
- Founded: By 21 ABY (officially formed); 29 ABY (publicly announced), from the remnants of the Galactic Empire
- Defunct: 35 ABY, collapsed after the Battle of Exegol
- Location: Star Wars galaxy
- Leader: Sheev Palpatine/Darth Sidious (5–35 ABY; secretly); Supreme Leader: Snoke (21–34 ABY); Kylo Ren (34–35 ABY); Allegiant General Enric Pryde (35 ABY; de facto)
- Key people: Grand Admiral Rae Sloane; Commandant Brendol Hux; General Armitage Hux; Captain Phasma
- Enemies: Resistance; New Republic (defeated); Jedi Order

The First Order is a fictional military movement in the Star Wars franchise, introduced in the 2015 film The Force Awakens. It is formed following the fall of the Galactic Empire after the events of Return of the Jedi (1983). Secretly guided by the resurrected Sith Lord Palpatine, the First Order aims to destroy the New Republic and rule the galaxy as an autocratic military dictatorship.

The First Order is the main antagonistic faction of the sequel trilogy, oppressing the pro-democracy Resistance (akin to the original trilogy's Rebel Alliance). It is led by puppet ruler Supreme Leader Snoke until he is overthrown by Kylo Ren, who assumes command until Palpatine's return. The organization also appears in various related media.

== Depiction ==
=== Origins ===
According to Star Wars: The Force Awakens: The Visual Dictionary (2015), and the trilogy novel series Star Wars: Aftermath by Chuck Wendig, after the Galactic Empire was defeated at Battle of Endor in 4 ABY in Return of the Jedi, thousands of worlds rose up to join the Rebel Alliance, and destroy the disorganized Empire, which had fallen victim to warlordism. The Alliance formally reorganized itself as the New Republic, and retook the Core Worlds, including the galactic capital, Coruscant. One year after Endor, the remaining Imperial fleet made one final, massive attempt at a counter-offensive which came to a climax at the planet Jakku, the biggest battle in the war since Endor. The Imperial counter-offensive was decisively defeated. The remaining Imperial forces were pushed back to a handful of sectors on the fringe of the Outer Rim, containing only a small fraction of the galaxy's population and industrial base. These sectors were a heavily fortified final redoubt, and the New Republic deemed that they posed too small a threat to justify the high cost in life that liberating them would require. The New Republic forced the Empire to accept the Galactic Concordance, a humiliating armistice agreement which imposed strict disarmament plans and punishing reparations on the remaining Imperials. The Aftermath trilogy establishes Imperial Admiral Rae Sloane, introduced as a captain in John Jackson Miller's 2014 novel A New Dawn, and Commandant Brendol Hux as the de facto founders of the First Order. Sloane, after achieving the rank of Grand Admiral, coined the term "First Order" as she establishes the reborn empire that will eventually take that name. She is additionally inferred as a future mentor figure for General Hux, who appears as a child in Empire's End.

Over time, fugitives of the Old Empire reorganized themselves, becoming a firmly entrenched and isolationist hermit kingdom, which spent the next three decades instigating what would become a "cold war" against the New Republic, gradually rebuilding its military strength and secretly re-arming in violation of its armistice agreements. The First Order secretly was aggressively pushing into the Unknown Regions (the unexplored swaths of territory in the galactic west) to seize new undeveloped worlds in order to supplement their resource base, as well as build new shipyards and industrial infrastructure far from the eyes of the New Republic.

The 2016 novel Star Wars: Bloodline explained how this faction officially reorganized into the "First Order", and that this final transition only occurred about six years before The Force Awakens. By that time, the New Republic Senate had become divided into two parties: the Populists led by Leia Organa, who wanted to decentralize authority, and the Centrists, who wanted power to remain concentrated in a strong central government. Many of the Centrists were former Imperials who admired the old Empire for bringing order to the galaxy, and who feared that without strong central control the New Republic would become as weak and ineffectual as the Old Republic. Ultimately, many Centrist worlds seceded from the New Republic to reunite with the holdout Imperial remnants on the fringe of the galaxy, and formally combined into a new government called "the First Order". First Order conspirators publicly revealed that Leia was in fact the daughter of Darth Vader, severely harming her political standing among the remaining Populists.

The vast majority of the New Republic's worlds remained intact, but with the exodus of the Centrists its Senate became dominated by the remaining Populists, who favored decentralization and demilitarization, not confrontation. Even after these events, most in the remaining Senate were happy to see the Centrists go, feeling that the new First Order still controlled far too few sectors of the galaxy to ever pose a serious threat to galactic peace. In their view, it was easier to just let the Centrist worlds peacefully leave of their own volition and rejoin the Imperial worlds rather than fight a war to keep them by force.

The new "First Order" came to be ruled by the mysterious Force-wielder known as Supreme Leader Snoke, who was secretly created by the resurrected Emperor Palpatine to control the First Order after purging its previous leadership. Through Snoke, Palpatine seduced Leia's own son Ben Solo to the dark side of the Force, who renamed himself "Kylo Ren". On his turn to the dark side, Ben/Kylo slaughtered most of his uncle Luke Skywalker's other Jedi apprentices (with the rest joining him) and destroyed his new academy. Blaming himself, Luke fled into self-imposed exile to search for the ancient first Jedi Temple. Kylo Ren, meanwhile, took on a position as Snoke's right hand within the First Order's military.

With her political standing severely weakened, and the New Republic Senate gridlocked and unwilling to recognize the First Order's military build-up, Leia Organa decided to withdraw and form her own small private army, known as the Resistance, to fight the First Order within its own borders. She was joined by other members of the former Rebel Alliance such as Admiral Ackbar. Publicly the New Republic continued to disavow direct association with the Resistance to maintain plausible deniability, and though the majority of the Senate did not want to intervene against the First Order, several Senators privately channeled funds and resources to the Resistance. This state of affairs continued on for the next six years until the events of The Force Awakens. Comic book writer Charles Soule, creator of the 2015 Marvel Comics series Star Wars: Poe Dameron, explained that immediately prior to the events of The Force Awakens, "The New Republic and the First Order are in a position of détente, and while there have been a few small skirmishes between the Resistance and the First Order, it's very much a sort of cold war."

=== Military ===
The First Order's handful of sectors simply do not possess the galaxy-wide resources the old Empire used to be able to draw upon, and in addition the armistice treaties with the New Republic put strict limitations on how many ships it could physically build. Therefore, unlike the old Galactic Empire's swarm tactics, the First Order's military has had to adapt to a more "quality over quantity" philosophy, making efficient use of what few resources it has. Culturally, the Galactic Empire's Sith-influenced philosophies have been incorporated and streamlined. Its military is built upon "survival of the fittest"; if one soldier cannot fulfil their duty and dies serving the First Order, then so be it. The Order can only become stronger by culling the weak from their ranks.

A major plot point in The Last Jedi is that the First Order has developed new "hyperspace tracking" technology, allowing them to continue to chase enemy vessels through hyperspace from one jump to the next (until one or the other runs out of fuel). This technology was first mentioned in passing in Rogue One as another research project the Empire was starting to develop almost forty years before. However, it appears that such technology existed at the time of A New Hope, as Darth Vader was able to track the Tantive IV from Scarif to Tatooine even through hyperspace.

==== Starfleet ====
Star Destroyers

The First Order lacked the resources to build and crew thousands of Star Destroyers. While its fleet is a fraction of the size of the Imperial fleet at its height, on a one-for-one basis its new ships are much more powerful. In addition, they boast thirty years' worth of advances in military technologies compared to the old Empire. As a result, the First Order now deploys starships such as the new Resurgent-class Star Destroyer, nearly twice as large as the old Imperial-class Star Destroyer which it replaced as the mainstay of the First Order fleet. With a naval doctrine that accepted the renewed importance of starfighters within their overall strategy, the Resurgent-class adopted the carrier-centric designs of the Galactic Republic's Venator-class Star Destroyer.

TIE pilot corps

The First Order's TIE fighters, designated TIE/fo, are more advanced than the old Empire's TIE/ln model, and show greater concern for unit stamina and survivability. The First Order's Special Forces use a more heavily armed two-man TIE/sf variant. Visually, their color scheme is reversed from the old Imperial design: the Empire's TIE fighters have black solar panels on a light grey metal body frame, while the First Order TIE fighters have white solar panels on a dark metal frame.

The Last Jedi also introduces a new starfighter element to the First Order fleet, the TIE silencer superiority fighter. Much as TIE interceptors were the next generation fighter starting to phase out the original Imperial TIE fighters, TIE silencers are heavily inspired by the Empire's TIE Defender and assigned only to the most elite units. Visually they somewhat resemble a cross between a TIE interceptor and Darth Vader's TIE Advanced x1 prototype, being wider and more elongated, while boasting heavier weapons and shields to be able to face X-wings head-on. Their technical designation is "TIE/vn" (because in earlier drafts, the ship was called "TIE vendetta"). Kylo Ren pilots his own personal TIE silencer in The Last Jedi, which he uses to assault the Resistance ship, the MC85 Star Cruiser Raddus.

In The Rise of Skywalker, another new TIE is introduced, the TIE whisper. This model comes in two variants, with either solar collectors resembling those of a TIE interceptor or those of a TIE fighter. The latter model is introduced during Poe Dameron's mission to the Sinta Glacier Colony, while Kylo Ren uses former as his personal craft in The Rise of Skywalker, using two ships in his pursuit of both Palpatine and Rey; both ships used are destroyed by Rey.

Other Star Wars media depicts more TIE variants in use by the First Order. Star Wars Resistance introduces a TIE interceptor variant designated TIE/ba, known as the TIE Baron. The series also introduces a TIE bomber variant designated TIE/se. The older TIE/sa bomber previously used by the Galactic Empire also saw service and was designated the First Order bomber. Other variants include the TIE/es assault shuttle, and a variant of the TIE/rb "Brute" heavy starfighter used previously by the Empire.

Troop Transports

For space to surface delivery, the First Order is also seen deploying several standard troop transports. Elite units and high value command personnel such as Kylo Ren use the Upsilon-class command shuttle, a stylistic evolution of the old Imperial Lambda-class T-4a shuttle (but without the third fin on top, and now sporting large wings that retract upon themselves on landing).

Dreadnoughts

The Last Jedi introduces several more ships of the First Order. Mandator IV-class Siege Dreadnoughts are larger but rarer than Resurgent-class Star Destroyers, used as orbital bombardment platforms which can functionally wipe out entire planets' population centers (albeit through conventional weapons, just short of being considered superweapons). Dwarfing even these other vessels are Supreme Leader Snoke's personal flagship and mobile capital, the Mega-class Star Dreadnought Supremacy: a wing-shaped vessel wider than it is long, the size of a small country. The Supremacy measures 60 kilometers at its greatest width—equal to about 18 Resurgent-class Star Destroyers lined up end to end.

==== Ground forces ====
The First Order employs a quality-over-quantity philosophy with its soldiers and personnel. Instead of conscription or breeding a Clone Army, First Order stormtroopers are kidnapped from their home worlds and trained from birth, raised their entire lives for no other purpose. Soldiers and crews constantly train for combat in war games and simulations, ensuring higher individual effieciency than the endless waves of stormtrooper conscripts fielded by the old Empire. Stormtroopers are regularly subject to mental indoctrination and propaganda programs, ensuring they remain fanatically loyal and never hesitate or question orders. Similarly, soldiers are identified merely by serial numbers, such as "FN-2187".

First Order stormtroopers are formally deployed in squads of ten, with the tenth spot reserved for a heavy weapons specialist as the needs of the mission require: usually a heavy gunner, but sometimes also flamethrower troops, or riot troops equipped with energy batons (which are incidentally capable of blocking a lightsaber). The design of the armor of regular and heavy gunner stormtroopers bears significant resemblances to the design used by the Galactic Empire, such as the helmet visor, nasal filters, and overall shape. However, the filter was extended, among other practical features. According to First Order officer Captain Phasma, not even a Wookiee could crush said armor. Some stormtroopers held high ranks—a significant improvement from the one-rank system of the Empire. These were indicated by the color of shoulder pauldrons: white for squad leaders, black for sergeants, and red for officers. In the rare instance of a stormtrooper earning the rank of captain, they often earned a blaster proof cape. Occasionally, they modify their outfit even further—Captain Phasma made blaster proof chrome copies of all her equipment and greatly improved vision modes of her helmet's visor. Captain Cardinal, the bodyguard of a First Order founding father, received almost all-red armor from his superior as a sign of trust. Introduced in The Rise of Skywalker, a new variant of troopers was introduced in the form of jet troopers, equipped with G125 projectile launchers and jet packs.

The First Order also fields its own evolution of the old AT-series of armored transports, the AT-M6, used as a heavy siege weapon. Dwarfing the older AT-AT, the AT-M6 has numerous design improvements including heavy serrated cable-cutters mounted on its legs—to avoid being tripped up again like AT-ATs were at the Battle of Hoth. These cutters are positioned in such a way that the AT-M6 walks on its "knuckles" instead of the pads of its feet, which—combined with a heavy siege cannon which gives it a hunched-over appearance—gives the AT-M6 an almost gorilla-like profile compared to the more elephant-like AT-AT.

=== Depictions in film ===
==== The Force Awakens (2015) ====
In the film, the First Order is led by a mysterious figure named Snoke, who has assumed the title of Supreme Leader. Like the Empire before them, the Order commands a vast force of stormtroopers. The First Order uses regular and Special Forces versions of the Empire's venerable TIE fighter. Its primary base of operations is Starkiller Base, the ice planet Ilum converted into a mobile superweapon capable of destroying entire star systems across the galaxy by firing through hyperspace. The base commander of Starkiller is General Hux, a ruthless young officer dedicated to the First Order.

Snoke is a powerful figure in the dark side of the Force and has corrupted Ben, the son of Han Solo and Leia Organa who had been an apprentice to his uncle, the Jedi Master Luke Skywalker. Masked and using the name Kylo Ren, he is one of Snoke's enforcers, much like his grandfather Darth Vader had been the enforcer of Emperor Palpatine during the days of the Empire decades earlier. Kylo is the master of the Knights of Ren, a mysterious group of elite warriors who work with the First Order. Kylo and Hux are rivals for Snoke's approval, and the third member of the "commanding triumvirate" of the First Order is the formidable Captain Phasma, the commander of the stormtroopers.

Kylo is searching for Luke, who vanished some years earlier. Snoke believes that as long as Luke lives, a new generation of Jedi Knights can rise again. The First Order launches a pre-emptive strike on Hosnian Prime, the New Republic's current capital world (as well as Hosnian Prime's sun and the other planets in the 'Hosnian system' (Hosnian Prime's solar system), as well as the New Republic starships there), by demonstrating the Starkiller's firepower. This devastating first strike takes the New Republic completely by surprise, not only killing most of its leadership in the Galactic Senate but wiping out a substantial portion of the New Republic's core military fleets. This paves the way for a resulting Blitzkrieg of the rest of the galaxy by the First Order, using the disproportionately powerful military it has rebuilt over the past three decades.

Kylo fails to retrieve the map fragment that would lead him to Luke, and the Resistance manages to destroy Starkiller Base moments before it is able to fire on the Resistance base on D'Qar, though Kylo and General Hux are able to escape the explosion, as well as Captain Phasma offscreen.

==== The Last Jedi (2017) ====
At the start of The Last Jedi, the First Order's fleet attacks the Resistance base on the planet D'Qar. Poe Dameron rashly leads an assault against a Mandator IV–class Siege Dreadnought—one of only a handful of heavy orbital bombardment platforms in the First Order fleet—and manages to destroy it, but at the cost of the entire bomber wing of the Resistance. Kylo Ren leads an assault in his TIE silencer, destroying several Resistance fighters. First Order TIEs destroy the Resistance carrier ship, wiping out the Resistance leadership. General Leia survives but is incapacitated. Vice Admiral Holdo assumes control of the Resistance fleet while Leia recovers.

The First Order tracks the small Resistance fleet via a hyperspace jump using new "hyperspace tracking" technology. Running low on fuel, the remaining Resistance fleet is pursued by the First Order. This devolves into a siege-like battle of attrition, as one by one the smaller Resistance ships run out of fuel and are destroyed by the pursuing First Order fleet. Finn and a Resistance mechanic, Rose, embark on a mission to disable the First Order's tracking device in the Mega-class Star Dreadnought Supremacy.

Meanwhile, Kylo Ren kills Snoke, replacing him as Supreme Leader of the First Order. Poe Dameron stages a mutiny against Holdo, believing her inept and without a plan. Holdo reveals, however, that she didn't trust Poe with her plan due to his reckless assault on the dreadnought. The plan is for the Resistance to flee in cloaked shuttles to an old Rebel Alliance base on the planet Crait, while Holdo remains on the Resistance command ship, the MC85 Star Cruiser Raddus. The First Order discovers the ruse, however, destroying most of the shuttlecraft. Finn and Rose locate the tracking device but are captured by Captain Phasma. Holdo sacrifices herself by directing the Raddus to lightspeed jump directly into the Mega-Destroyer, destroying much of the First Order fleet in the process. Finn manages to kill Captain Phasma and escape with Rose to Crait.

The First Order blast the door of the Rebel base with miniaturized Death Star technology. Leia sends out transmissions to allies "in the Outer Rim" requesting for aid, but they inexplicably do not appear. Just as the First Order breaches the base, Luke Skywalker appears to challenge them. A full barrage by their artillery has no effect on Luke, so Kylo Ren descends to duel him in person. Ren realizes that Luke is a Force projection; while Ren is distracted, the surviving Resistance escape the planet.

==== The Rise of Skywalker (2019) ====
The Rise of Skywalker takes place a year after The Last Jedi. The First Order is now led by Supreme Leader Kylo Ren after Snoke's death. Allegiant General Pryde, who served Palpatine in the Empire, has now joined General Hux at the top of the military hierarchy. Kylo Ren discovers a physically impaired Palpatine in exile on the Sith world Exegol. Palpatine reveals he created Snoke as a puppet to control the First Order and has built the Sith Eternal's fleet of Xyston-class Star Destroyers, the Final Order. In a bid to form a new Sith Empire, Palpatine promises Kylo control over the fleet on the condition that he find and kill Rey, who is revealed to be Palpatine's granddaughter.

Kylo begins to scour the galaxy for Rey. The Resistance acquires information on Palpatine's location and embarks on a quest to find Exegol. Hux is revealed to have been a spy inside the First Order, due to his contempt for Kylo Ren. He is found out by Pryde and executed for treason. Rey confronts Kylo Ren on Kef Bir at the wreckage of the second Death Star. She impales Kylo after he is distracted by Leia calling out to him through the Force. Rey heals Kylo and flees. Afterward, Kylo sees a vision of his father, Han Solo, through a memory. This causes Kylo to abandon the dark side and reclaim his true identity as Ben Solo. Palpatine orders Pryde to send a Sith Star Destroyer to obliterate Kijimi as a show of force and tells him to come to Exegol, effectively making Pryde de facto leader of the First Order and a commanding officer of the Sith fleet.

After encouragement from the spirit of Luke Skywalker, Rey uses his old T-65B X-wing, Red Five, to travel to Exegol and leads the Resistance there too. Finn and Poe engage the Sith Eternal forces while Rey confronts Palpatine. Lando Calrissian and Chewbacca arrive with reinforcements from across the galaxy, and they destroy the remaining Sith forces, killing Pryde as well in the process. With help from Ben and the spirits of past Jedi, Rey finally destroys Palpatine and the galaxy rises up against the First Order, ultimately destroying it after 14 years of existing and ending a grand total of 54 years of Imperial power once and for all and for good.
