= List of Star Wars sequel trilogy characters =

Characters in American film trilogy

This incomplete list contains only the major characters and storylines featured in the three films of the Star Wars sequel trilogy.

== Background ==
The Star Wars sequel trilogy is the third trilogy of the main Star Wars franchise, an American space opera created by George Lucas. It is produced by Lucasfilm Ltd. and distributed by Walt Disney Studios Motion Pictures. The trilogy consists of episodes VII through IX, chronologically following the prequel trilogy (Episodes I–III; 1999–2005) and the original trilogy (Episodes IV–VI; 1977–1983), serving as the final act of the "Skywalker saga".

The first installment, The Force Awakens, was released on December 18, 2015, after a 30-year hiatus between the original and sequel trilogies. It was directed by J. J. Abrams who co-wrote the screenplay with Lawrence Kasdan and Michael Arndt. Original trilogy cast members including Harrison Ford, Mark Hamill, and Carrie Fisher reprised their roles, co-starring alongside franchise newcomers Daisy Ridley, John Boyega, Adam Driver, and Oscar Isaac. The second installment, The Last Jedi, was released on December 15, 2017, with Rian Johnson as screenwriter and director, and most of the cast returning. The final installment, The Rise of Skywalker, was released on December 20, 2019. It was directed by Abrams, who co-wrote it with Chris Terrio.

The trilogy follows the orphan Rey and the plight of the Resistance against the First Order, which has risen from the fallen Galactic Empire. Rey learns the ways of the Force under Luke Skywalker and Leia Organa, and confronts Kylo Ren—the son of Leia and Han Solo, nephew of Luke, and grandson of Anakin Skywalker—who has fallen to the dark side. The first two films received positive reviews from critics, while the third received mixed reviews. The trilogy grossed over $4.4 billion at the box office worldwide, with each film surpassing $1 billion worldwide.

Some reports indicate that, contrary to popular belief, some plot points across the trilogy were planned in advance. The idea of Luke Skywalker living on an island following his failure to stop the murder of his Jedi apprentices and then training an apprentice who would help him overcome his self-doubt was first pitched by George Lucas in 2013 during creative meetings between himself and Lucasfilm as part of story discussions for Episode VII (these ideas would later be used in The Last Jedi). Several plot points of The Rise of Skywalker were pitched in an early 2014 story meeting between Lucasfilm executives (including Dave Filoni, Pablo Hidalgo, Doug Chiang, John Knoll and Kiri Hart) after the plot of The Force Awakens had been finalized, including the notion of Leia as a mentor figure to Rey, Leia breaking through to her son Ben Solo (Kylo Ren) and the notion of Rey as "the Skywalker" of the trilogy by metaphor rather than blood connection. The return of Emperor Palpatine in Episode IX was planned as far back as the earliest development phase of the trilogy. Similarly, Abrams hinted that Palpatine being Rey's grandfather was an early idea he and Lawrence Kasdan had while working on The Force Awakens, although Daisy Ridley later claimed that ideas for Rey's lineage changed throughout filming of The Rise of Skywalker. Adam Driver claimed that back when shooting The Force Awakens, Kylo Ren was not meant to be redeemed by the end of the trilogy, which was the character arc Abrams had in mind at that moment, with Ren starting insecure about his commitment to the dark side before becoming the one most committed by the end of the trilogy in reversal to his grandfather Darth Vader's arc in the original trilogy, noting that Johnson took that planned direction in consideration when shooting The Last Jedi even though he took other decisions.

== Cast ==
Character	The Force Awakens (2015)	The Last Jedi (2017)	The Rise of Skywalker (2019)
Han Solo	Harrison Ford		Harrison Ford
Luke Skywalker	Mark Hamill	Mark Hamill	Mark Hamill
Leia Organa	Carrie Fisher	Carrie Fisher	Carrie Fisher
Ben Solo / Kylo Ren	Adam Driver	Adam Driver	Adam Driver
Rey	Daisy Ridley	Daisy Ridley	Daisy Ridley
Finn	John Boyega	John Boyega	John Boyega
Poe Dameron	Oscar Isaac	Oscar Isaac	Oscar Isaac
Maz Kanata	Lupita Nyong'o	Lupita Nyong'o	Lupita Nyong'o
Supreme Leader Snoke	Andy Serkis	Andy Serkis	
General Hux	Domhnall Gleeson	Domhnall Gleeson	Domhnall Gleeson
C-3PO	Anthony Daniels	Anthony Daniels	Anthony Daniels
Chewbacca	Peter Mayhew	Joonas Suotamo	Joonas Suotamo
Captain Phasma	Gwendoline Christie	Gwendoline Christie	
Rose Tico		Kelly Marie Tran	Kelly Marie Tran
Vice-Admiral Holdo		Laura Dern	
Jannah			Naomi Ackie
Allegiant General Pryde			Richard E. Grant
Zorii Bliss			Keri Russell
Emperor Palpatine / Darth Sidious			Ian McDiarmid
Lando Calrissian			Billy Dee Williams

== Main characters ==
=== Han Solo ===
Han Solo is a veteran of the old Rebel Alliance who comes back into the fray in an attempt to save his son, Kylo Ren, from the dark side.

The character is portrayed by Harrison Ford, reprising his role from the original trilogy.

=== Luke Skywalker ===
Luke Skywalker is the last surviving Jedi Master who exiled himself following his failure to keep Ben Solo from the dark side.

The character is portrayed by Mark Hamill, reprising his role from the original trilogy.

=== Leia Organa ===
Leia Organa is a leader of the Resistance against the First Order.

The character is portrayed by Carrie Fisher reprising her role from the original trilogy.

=== Ben Solo / Kylo Ren ===
Ben Solo is the son of Han Solo and Leia Organa who was seduced to the dark side of the Force by Supreme Leader Snoke. He ascended to lead the Knights of Ren and took a place of prominence within the First Order. Later, his dyad relationship with Rey causes him to feel conflict, as well as his murder of his father Han Solo. Ben eventually returns to the light side following a vision of his father, and he dies and becomes one with the Force to save Rey from Emperor Palpatine.

The character is portrayed by Adam Driver.

=== Rey ===
Rey is a scavenger from Jakku who was seemingly abandoned by her parents. She soon realizes she is extremely strong with the Force, and that she is a grandchild of Palpatine.

The character is portrayed by Daisy Ridley.

=== Finn ===
Finn is a former stormtrooper who defected from the First Order.

The character is portrayed by John Boyega.

=== Poe Dameron ===
Poe Dameron is the Resistance's best pilot, and owner of the droid BB-8.

The character is portrayed by Oscar Isaac.

=== Maz Kanata ===
Maz Kanata is an ancient former pirate and smuggler.

The character is portrayed by Lupita Nyong'o.

=== Supreme Leader Snoke ===
Supreme Leader Snoke is a corrupted clone of Palpatine and leader of the First Order.

The character is portrayed by Andy Serkis.

=== General Hux ===
General Hux is the public face of the leadership of the First Order.

The character is portrayed by Domhnall Gleeson.

=== C-3PO ===
C-3PO is a protocol droid who serves with the Resistance.

The character is portrayed by Anthony Daniels, reprising his role from the original trilogy.

=== Chewbacca ===
Chewbacca is a Wookiee pilot and friend of Han Solo.

The character was first portrayed by Peter Mayhew, reprising his role from the original trilogy. Following Mayhew's health issues and then death, the character was portrayed by Joonas Suotamo.

=== Captain Phasma ===
Captain Phasma is the commander of the First Order's stormtroopers.

The character is portrayed by Gwendoline Christie.

=== Rose Tico ===
Rose Tico is a mechanic for the Resistance.

The character is portrayed by Kelly Marie Tran.

=== Vice-Admiral Holdo ===
Vice-Admiral Holdo is one of the leaders of the Resistance who takes command after Leia is incapacitated.

The character is portrayed by Laura Dern.

=== Jannah ===
Jannah is a former stormtrooper who defected from the First Order.

The character is portrayed by Naomi Ackie.

=== Zorii Bliss ===
Zorii Bliss is a spice smuggler and former lover of Poe Dameron.

The character is portrayed by Keri Russell.

=== Emperor Palpatine / Darth Sidious ===
Palpatine is the Dark Lord of the Sith and former ruler of the Galactic Empire who is revealed to have somehow survived his apparent death at the hands of Anakin Skywalker aboard the second Death Star. In his exile on Exegol, he has built a massive Sith armada, the Final Order, and entourage of Sith cultists.

The character is portrayed by Ian McDiarmid, reprising his role from the original trilogy.

=== Lando Calrissian ===
Lando Calrissian is a former smuggler and friend of Han Solo.

The character is portrayed by Billy Dee Williams, reprising his role from the original trilogy.

Rian Johnson stated that he considered including Lando Calrissian in Episode VIII, possibly giving him the role of new character DJ (Benicio del Toro), but did not because it would have meant Lando betraying the characters without redemption.

== Other notable characters ==
=== Jakku ===
- Unkar Plutt (Simon Pegg) – a Crolute junkboss who pays out rations of food in exchange for scavenged parts
- Teedo (Kiran Shah) – a scavenger
- Lor San Tekka (Max von Sydow) – an old ally of Luke Skywalker

=== First Order ===
- Captain Canady (Mark Lewis Jones) – captain of a First Order Dreadnought
- Colonel Kaplan (Pip Torrens) – officer in the First Order
- Lieutenant Mitaka (Sebastian Armesto) – officer in the First Order
- Captain Peavey (Ade Edmondson) – captain for the First Order
- Allegiant General Pryde (Richard E. Grant) – Military commander of the First Order following Kylo by Supreme Leader
- Thanisson (Thomas Brodie-Sangster) – officer in the First Order

=== Resistance ===
- Admiral Ackbar (Timothy D. Rose, Erik Bauersfeld, Tom Kane) – a Mon Calamari leader of the Resistance
- BB-8 – droid companion of Poe Dameron
- Taslin Brance (Emun Elliott) – officer
- Kaydel Ko Connix (Billie Lourd) –junior controller in the Resistance
- Commander D'Acy (Amanda Lawrence) – ground forces commander for the Resistance
- Caluan Ematt (Andrew Jack) – lieutenant for the Resistance
- Babu Frik (Shirley Henderson) – Anzellan droidsmith
- Dr. Kalonia (Harriet Walter) – medic
- Beaumont Kin (Dominic Monaghan) – member of the Resistance
- Tallie Lintra (Hermione Corfield) – pilot for the Resistance
- Nien Nunb (Mike Quinn, Kipsang Rotich) – veteran pilot for the Resistance
- Jessika Pava (Jessica Henwick) – pilot for the Resistance
- Admiral Statura (Ken Leung) – veteran resistance officer
- Paige Tico (Veronica Ngo) – pilot and gunner
- Temmin "Snap" Wexley (Greg Grunberg) – Resistance pilot

=== Criminal Underworld ===
- DJ (Benicio del Toro) – code slicer
- Tasu Leech (Yayan Ruhian) – leader of Kanjiklub
- Bazine Netal (Anna Brewster) – mercenary
- Razoo Qin-Fee (Iko Uwais) – member of Kanjiklub
- Bala-Tik (Brian Vernel) – negotiator for the Guavian Death Gang

=== Jedi ===
- Yoda (Frank Oz) – former grand Jedi Master and mentor to Luke Skywalker who appears as a Force spirit.
- When Rey confronts Palpatine, many voices of past Jedi (with many actors reprising their roles from previous Star Wars media) are heard encouraging her and giving her strength, including Yoda, Obi-Wan Kenobi (Alec Guinness, Ewan McGregor), Anakin Skywalker (Hayden Christensen), Ahsoka Tano (Ashley Eckstein), Kanan Jarrus (Freddie Prinze Jr.), Luminara Unduli (Olivia d'Abo), Qui-Gon Jinn (Liam Neeson), Aayla Secura (Jennifer Hale), Mace Windu (Samuel L. Jackson), Adi Gallia (Angelique Perrin), and Luke Skywalker (Mark Hamill).
