= Kalonia =

Kalonia may refer to:

- Harter Kalonia, a Star Wars character

== See also ==
- Kalona, Iowa
