= Rose Tico =

Star Wars character

- Star Wars character
- Kelly Marie Tran as Rose Tico in Star Wars: The Last Jedi
- First appearance: The Last Jedi (2017)
- Last appearance: The Rise of Skywalker (2019)
- Created by: Rian Johnson
- Portrayed by: Kelly Marie Tran

In-universe information
- Species: Human
- Gender: Female
- Occupation: Maintenance worker
- Affiliation: Resistance
- Family: Hue Tico (father); Paige Tico (sister); Thanya Tico (mother)
- Significant other: Finn (The Last Jedi)
- Homeworld: Hays Minor

Rose Tico is a fictional character in the Star Wars franchise, first appearing in the simultaneously released Star Wars: The Last Jedi and Cobalt Squadron (both 2017). A mechanic with the Resistance, she befriends Finn (John Boyega) and works with him to try to help Resistance forces escape from the First Order. Rose is portrayed by Kelly Marie Tran.

Rose was created by The Last Jedi writer and director Rian Johnson after he decided a subplot originally involving Finn and Poe Dameron needed a different dynamic. The Last Jedi marked Kelly Marie Tran's first film role, and she had never watched a Star Wars film before auditioning for the part. As a struggling actress who had contemplated quitting the profession, Tran underwent an intense five-month audition process, successfully competing against hundreds of other actresses for the role.

Rose's backstory is revealed in the novel Star Wars: The Last Jedi: Cobalt Squadron (2017), where she is the protagonist alongside her sister Paige, a minor character in the film. The novel establishes that Rose and Paige joined the Resistance after their impoverished home planet was devastated by the First Order. The character of Rose serves as a relatable audience surrogate, an everywoman, a positive influence on Finn, and the personification of real-life Star Wars fandom. Johnson originally planned for Rose to be sarcastic and irritable, but the character was changed to match Tran's personality after she was cast, becoming more positive. Tran felt a connection between Rose's past experiences and those of her own family during the Vietnam War, and she researched the conflict and her family's past to help get into Rose's mindset.

The character and Tran's portrayal received largely positive reactions from critics, though fan reception was more divided, and she became the subject of racist and sexist attacks over the internet. Multiple fans and celebrities came to Tran's defense, and she directly responded to the harassment with an essay in The New York Times. For her performance in The Last Jedi, Tran was nominated for the Saturn Award for Best Supporting Actress.

Rose returned in Star Wars: The Rise of Skywalker (2019), the final installment in the sequel trilogy, in which she has risen in the ranks of the Resistance and has taken on a greater leadership role. The character's reduced role in the film was a major point of criticism for many, who saw it as giving in to online racist and sexist attacks against Tran, though writer Chris Terrio and Tran herself dismissed those criticisms, with Terrio stating that her minor role was not deliberate, and Tran stating that she was proud of being a part of the film.

== Appearances ==
=== Cobalt Squadron ===
Although Rose Tico was first conceived for the film Star Wars: The Last Jedi (2017), her backstory is established in the mid-grade canon novel Star Wars: The Last Jedi: Cobalt Squadron (2017), by Elizabeth E. Wein. The novel and film were both released on December 15, 2017, and Cobalt Squadron is set just before and during the events of Star Wars: The Force Awakens (2015), the first film in the Star Wars sequel trilogy. Dialogue that referred to parts of the novel's backstory was included in the original The Last Jedi script, but was cut from the final film. Rose is the primary protagonist of the novel along with her older sister, Paige Tico, who was portrayed by Veronica Ngo during a brief appearance in the film. Although their parents are not featured as characters in the novel, the reference book Star Wars: The Last Jedi: The Visual Dictionary establishes that the Tico sisters had a close relationship with their parents, Hue and Thanya, who raised them to have a strong sense of right and wrong. Rose and Paige were raised on the planet Hays Minor, the impoverished mining planet in the Otomok star system far beyond the policing efforts of the New Republic government. Hays Minor is one of the first places to be victimized by the First Order, an autocratic military dictatorship seeking to control the galaxy. The First Order used the planet to test its weapons and kidnap children to indoctrinate as stormtroopers. As a result, Rose developed a hatred of the First Order starting in her early childhood. The Tico sisters joined the Resistance, a paramilitary organization led by General Leia Organa fighting against the First Order. The two worked together on a bomber spacecraft called the Cobalt Hammer, where Paige was a gunner and Rose was a mechanical engineer. Despite her lack of formal training, Rose received the post due to her extensive mechanical knowledge. Rose and Paige each wear matching medallions resembling the insignia of their home system of Otomok.

At the beginning of Cobalt Squadron, Rose and Paige are on a mission to test new stealth technology when they encounter and rescue a fugitive fleeing from First Order TIE fighters. They later learn the fugitives were from a planet in the Atterra System which, like Rose's and Paige's home planet, has been devastated by the First Order. Leia authorizes a team of bombers, including Rose and Paige aboard the Cobalt Hammer, to gather reconnaissance in the Atterra System and run supplies to the citizens there. Leia also asks Rose to devise a technique to allow the bombers to escape First Order detection, leading her to invent a device called a "baffler", which reduces the ship's ion emissions and makes its energy signature harder to detect, thus making the bombers more difficult for enemy sensors to locate. Though they sustain casualties from First Order defenders, Rose and the team successfully deliver the supplies, and then escape. Upon returning to the Resistance, they learn that the entire Hosnian star system, which had housed the capital of the New Republic, was destroyed by the First Order superweapon Starkiller Base, which itself was subsequently destroyed by the Resistance. Rose and Paige prepare to assist with the evacuation of the Resistance base on the planet D'Qar, which leads directly into the events in the first scene of Star Wars: The Last Jedi. As a result of the success of Rose's baffler system, Vice Admiral Amilyn Holdo orders that it be adopted throughout the Resistance fleet.

=== The Last Jedi ===
In an early scene in Star Wars: The Last Jedi, Paige Tico is killed during the evacuation of D'Qar, when the Cobalt Hammer is destroyed during an operation in which Paige helps destroy the First Order Dreadnought. (Note: Although it was excluded from the film, the novelization of The Last Jedi revealed Rose was not with Paige on the mission because she was helping demonstrate how the Resistance could use her baffler technology to mask their ships. The novel also established that after Paige's death, a survivor of Paige's bombing squadron gave Rose a ring with the insignia of the Rebel Alliance, to commemorate Paige's sacrifice.) Rose mourns her sister's death aboard the Raddus, a Resistance Mon Calamari cruiser. She is guarding the escape pods against potential Resistance deserters when she finds Finn, a Resistance hero she greatly admires, attempting to flee in one of the pods. After Rose stops him by stunning him with an electro-shock prod, Finn tells her the First Order had found a way to track the Resistance fleet through hyperspace. The two formulate a plan to disable the tracking device on Supreme Leader Snoke's flagship, the Supremacy, which will allow the Raddus to escape. With help from Resistance droid BB-8, Rose and Finn set off on an unauthorized mission to the casino city of Canto Bight to find a master codebreaker to assist them.

Although Finn is impressed by the superficial beauty and debauchery of Canto Bight, Rose reveals to him the dark underpinnings of the lavish casino city, pointing out the fortunes of the city's rich inhabitants are supported by child slavery, weapons dealing, and other immoral activities that result in the suffering of others. Rose and Finn are arrested for their illegal entry into Canto Bight, and in prison they meet an unnamed slicer, who along with BB-8 helps them escape and agrees to assist them in disabling the Supremacy's tracking device. The four escape Canto Bight with the help of some of the enslaved children there; Rose gives one of them Paige's Rebel Alliance ring to inspire his trust. Rose and the others return to the Supremacy and infiltrate the Mega-Destroyer disguised as First Order officers, but are captured by General Hux and Captain Phasma before they can disable the tracking device. The slicer betrays Rose and Finn, informing the First Order of their plan and providing information about the Resistance in exchange for his release and a monetary reward.

Phasma attempts to execute Rose and Finn, but BB-8 helps them escape and fight their way to freedom. Meanwhile, the surviving Resistance forces escape to an old Rebel Alliance base on the nearby planet Crait; according to The Last Jedi novelization, the baffler technology developed by Rose helps the Resistance ships in their escape. Rose, Finn, and BB-8 board a stolen First Order light shuttle and fly to Crait. Along with Finn and Poe, Rose pilots a ski speeder in a defensive battle against First Order forces, during which they try to destroy a super-laser siege cannon before it can destroy the door to the base. Finn attempts a suicide attack against the cannon, but Rose saves his life by crashing her speeder into his, knocking him off course and seriously injuring herself in the process. Rose tells Finn the only way they will defeat the First Order is by fighting for what they love, rather than fighting what they hate; she then kisses him before passing out. Finn brings Rose back to the base, and her unconscious body is taken aboard the Millennium Falcon along with the other Resistance survivors. Rose receives medical attention as they flee Crait and escape from the First Order.

=== The Rise of Skywalker ===
Rose returns in a smaller role in The Rise of Skywalker, the final film of the Star Wars sequel trilogy. In the year following the events of The Last Jedi, Rose has risen in the ranks of the Resistance and has taken on a greater leadership role, serving as head of the Engineering Corps. She is stationed on the Resistance's secret base on the jungle moon of Ajan Kloss throughout the film. When Rey, Finn, Poe Dameron, Chewbacca, C-3PO, and BB-8 embark on a mission to help track down the revived Palpatine and the Sith Eternal's fleet of Sith Star Destroyers, the Final Order, Finn invites Rose to come along. She declines because General Leia Organa has asked her to study the specifications of Imperial Star Destroyers. She later participates in the climactic battle scene between the Resistance and the Sith Eternal at the planet of Exegol. Rose communicates with Finn and his ally Jannah during the battle, and expresses concern for their safety as the fighting intensifies. She survives the battle and is present with the Resistance when they celebrate their victory later on Ajan Kloss.

=== Other media ===
Rose Tico has been featured in several Star Wars comic books. She was the protagonist of "Rose Knows", a story in the sixth issue of the Star Wars Adventures comic book series, which was released on January 17, 2018. "Rose Knows" portrays Rose as an extremely dedicated mechanic who, after first becoming stationed on the Raddus just prior to the events of The Last Jedi, continues working well after her shift ends to study the ship's manuals and learn more about the vessel. The comic also included the first meeting of Rose and Resistance pilot and officer Poe Dameron, to whom she responded with an excitement similar to that when she met Finn in The Last Jedi. The knowledge Rose obtains from her research of the Raddus ultimately helps her in assisting Poe when his squadron is attacked by First Order TIE fighters.

Rose and Paige Tico were the protagonists of the final issue of Star Wars: Forces of Destiny, a five-issue comic book miniseries based on an animated web series of the same name. The issue, entitled "Rose & Paige", was released on January 31, 2018, and was set before the events of The Force Awakens, when the Resistance was still based on D'Qar. General Leia Organa is seeking methods to collect natural resources, and Rose conceives an idea to build rechargeable vehicles from junk parts. Lacking confidence, Rose is reluctant to volunteer the idea, but Paige insists that she do so. Despite some opposition from the base's engineers, Leia receives the idea warmly, and Rose gets two vehicles working with support from Paige and Leia. The issue illustrated Rose's deep respect and admiration for Leia; she admitted to Paige, "Every time she talks to me, I can barely function." Paige later becomes lost in the D'Qar jungles during a scouting mission, and Rose helps find and rescue her.

Rose was the protagonist of one of four announced installments in Age of Resistance, a comic book miniseries that chronicled different characters and time periods from the Star Wars chronology. The issue, entitled Age of Resistance: Rose, was released in September 2019, and focused on Rose's relationship with her sister Paige during the First Order's invasion of Hays Minor. This includes Rose and Paige working covertly to sabotage the First Order on the planet, as well as them fleeing Hays Minor to join the Resistance, at the insistence of their parents. The comic was the first to directly show interaction between the Tico sisters and their parents, and particularly illustrates how they teach the sisters skills that will later serve them in the Resistance, such as piloting starfighters. It also includes a scene in which Rose and Paige, upon learning of the destruction of Hays Minor, seek to take a ship and fly back to the planet for a suicidal revenge attack against First Order, but are stopped by Leia and urged to stay and serve the Resistance instead.

Rose appeared in "Shuttle Shock", a second season episode of the Star Wars: Forces of Destiny animated web series, created by Lucasfilm Animation and released through Disney's YouTube channel. The series depicted two- or three-minute stories from various points in the Star Wars chronology. "Shuttle Shock" was released on March 19, 2018, with Kelly Marie Tran reprising her role as the voice of Rose Tico. The episode was set before Rose, Finn, and BB-8 reached Canto Bight in The Last Jedi. Their space shuttle is attacked by huge jellyfish-like creatures, and Rose repairs a shorted-out BB-8 while Finn attempts to fly to safety. In early 2018, Rose was added as a playable character in the mobile collectible RPG game Star Wars: Galaxy of Heroes. Her character had special moves such as "Courageous Shot" and "Dauntless Idealism", and was able to stun characters with her shock prod, just as she did to Finn in The Last Jedi.

Rose Tico played a supporting role in the four-issue comic book miniseries Star Wars: Allegiance, the first issue of which was released on October 9, 2019. Written by Ethan Sacks and illustrated by Luke Ross and Lee Loughridge, Allegiance is set shortly after The Last Jedi, and in the story Leia asks Rose to accompany her on a mission to the planet Mon Cala to help secure allies for the Resistance. When Leia and her party are threatened by potential enemies, Rose is quickly prepared to help defend them, though Leia attempts to defuse any hostilities. Rose ends up arrested along with Rey, Chewbacca, and C-3PO after they get into a dispute with protestors from the Quarren species. When Rey is coerced into a duel with a massive combat droid, Rose and Chewbacca interfere in the fight and help Rey defeat it. In the final issue of the series, Rose works with Rey to track down a terrorist who attacked the group due to opposition to Mon Cala allying itself with the Resistance.

Rose also appeared in Lego Star Wars: All-Stars, a series of Lego Star Wars animated short films set in different time periods of the Star Wars chronology. The series launched on October 29, 2018, with Tran once again providing the voice of Rose. A profile about Rose Tico was featured in Star Wars: Women of the Galaxy, a book by Amy Ratcliffe highlighting 75 female characters from the Star Wars franchise. The book was released on October 30, 2018.

In the weeks approaching the release of The Rise of Skywalker, Rose was featured in the novels Star Wars: Spark of the Resistance and Star Wars: Resistance Reborn, both of which were released as part of a multimedia project called "Journey to Star Wars: The Rise of Skywalker". Spark of the Resistance, a junior novel by Justina Ireland released on October 4, 2019, tells the story of Rose, Rey, Poe, and BB-8 as they travel to an isolated planet called Minfar to investigate a distress signal. There they discover the First Order has invaded the planet and threatened the indigenous population in an attempt to find secret laboratories and discover a legendary weapon called the Echo Horn, which has the ability to control the minds of its victims. Rose and the others successfully repel the First Order and keep the weapon out of their hands. The novel features illustrations of Rose and the other characters by artist Phil Noto. Rose has a smaller part of in Resistance Reborn, a novel by Rebecca Roanhorse released on November 5, 2019, which details the efforts by General Leia Organa and the other Resistance members to rebuild their forces immediately following the defeats sustained in The Last Jedi. In the novel, Rose has recovered quickly from the injuries she suffered in The Last Jedi and is actively working to help restore the Resistance. The book also includes a scene where Poe asks Finn about any romantic feelings for Rose. Finn responds by stating that although they shared "a moment" with a kiss on Crait, they are just friends.

== Characterization ==
In a lot of movies today, we see people that are royalty, or are superheroes, or have magical powers... I love the idea of someone who might not necessarily be in the forefront of the action to begin with, someone who is like a cog in the machine that helps the Resistance keep going. But then at one point, you have to face your fears and have to be pulled into a situation and be able to face any challenge.

— Kelly Marie Tran

Various Star Wars media portrayed the character of Rose Tico as an excellent and highly imaginative mechanic, with a methodical, technical mind, being largely self-taught, a unique background that implied her resourceful, inventive, and prone to outside-the-box thinking For example, most characters in The Last Jedi reacted with shock that the First Order was tracking the Resistance through hyperspace because it was believed to be impossible, but Rose deduced the problem and helped develop a solution. Rose has been described as passionate, loyal, and committed, with a great deal of enthusiasm and intelligence, and a strong moral code. Idealistic and energetic, the character maintained a sense of optimism despite her difficult past and the challenge the Resistance faces against the First Order. She was portrayed as tough, stubborn, and blunt, as well as intensely focused and determined. But she was also kind, and understood the value of protecting what is good, rather than just fighting what is bad. Rose also had a great deal of fascination with the galaxy around her, and a sense of awe about the Resistance and the heroes that serve it. She was hard-working, resilient, and brave, though The Daily Telegraph noted her courage is subtle and not flashy "in a dashing, daring Poe Dameron-style way".

The Rose character strongly believed in the cause of the Resistance, to which she dedicated her life, and she placed that cause ahead of all things, including herself. In this way she differed from Finn at the start of The Last Jedi, who was more concerned about himself and his friends than with helping the Resistance or stopping the First Order. However, the example Rose set for Finn inspired him, leading him to capture some of her idealism and place the mission of the Resistance ahead of himself. The Last Jedi writer and director Rian Johnson has described Rose as the "angel on Finn's shoulder", serving as his conscience and trying to steer him in the right direction, while the unnamed slicer they encountered serves the opposite function. Rose's willingness without hesitation to give her precious medallion to the unnamed slicer in exchange for his help showed her unflinching demonstration to the Resistance cause. However, she could also be rebellious, and was willing to disobey orders to do what she thinks is right, as shown by her willingness to work with Finn and Poe on a secret plan to help the Resistance in The Last Jedi.

Rose was very close with her family, and a strong sense of right and wrong was instilled in her by her late parents and her sister Paige. Rose particularly looked up to Paige, and the two had an extremely strong emotional connection; according to the Cobalt Squadron novel, the two had never been apart for more than a couple of days, and they shared "a bond that would have been extraordinary even between twins". That bond, along with their shared tragic history, helped propel them to do the right thing in the face of danger. Prior to the events of The Last Jedi, Rose was more shy and self-conscious, but Paige had faith in Rose's abilities and encouraged her even when Rose herself lacked confidence. Paige often forced her younger sister to step forward and be more forthcoming about her ideas and thoughts. This was particularly illustrated in the "Rose & Paige" issue of the Star Wars: Forces of Destiny comic book, during which Rose hesitated to share an idea with General Leia Organa until Paige pushed her to do so. In writing about Rose's past in Forces of Destiny and the Star Wars Adventures comic books, writer Delilah S. Dawson said she believed the example Paige set for Rose "gave her context for her increased confidence and strength in The Last Jedi." When Paige died, Rose felt a void in her own identity, according to Tran, but ultimately Paige's love for Rose helped her become more confident and carry on after her sister was gone. Paige's death also drove Rose that much harder to fight against the First Order, so her sister's death would not be in vain.

Rose's rage toward the First Order was informed not only by Paige's death, but also because she personally witnessed the brutality and devastation it unleashed on her home planet of Hays Minor. As a result, her dedication to the Resistance was not tied to a noble, abstract idea of heroism, but a firsthand knowledge of the threat they are fighting, which gave her a deeper understanding of the war than even some of the soldiers around her. Rose's past experiences also made her feel anger at the mistreatment of others, particularly vulnerable populations, as seen by her contempt for Canto Bight and her sympathy for both the enslaved children and the abused creatures there. Rose's feelings occasionally manifested in anger, such as her reaction when she discovered Finn attempting to flee the Raddus, or when she said of Canto Bight that she wished she could "put (her) first through this whole lousy beautiful town". However, Rose was also very empathetic, as demonstrated by the kindness she showed the children on Canto Bight, and the way she rescued Finn at the end of The Last Jedi.

Rose also served the role of everywoman in The Last Jedi. Her idealistic nature was something the viewer is meant to identify with; Johnson said in creating the character, he wanted to make someone who could inspire his "10-year-old self". Both Johnson and Tran have described Rose as an unlikely hero who preferred to work in the background, but was pulled into a prominent position in the conflict by the circumstances around her. While the Star Wars franchise often focused on particularly strong or powerful heroes, Rose was a very low-ranking member of the Resistance, and she demonstrated that every position matters and anyone, no matter their status or position, can make a difference. She also illustrated how war affects the average person. Despite her talents and abilities, Rose did not consider herself a hero, nor was she seeking to become one. Tran said of the character: "It's such a huge deal to me, the idea that she's not necessarily special in the way that we have defined special before in other movies, or in other stories."

Rose has also been described as the personification of real-life Star Wars fandom, with Tran herself saying: "I definitely believe that Rose embodies the idea of a fan being pulled into something that's kind of crazy." This was particularly illustrated in Rose's excitement about meeting Finn for the first time, during which she trips over her words, excitedly calling him "The Finn", and nervously said "doing talking [sic] with Resistance heroes isn't really my forte". She had similar reactions upon meeting other Resistance figures in other works of Star Wars media, including Poe Dameron and Leia Organa.

== Concept and creation ==
=== Conception ===
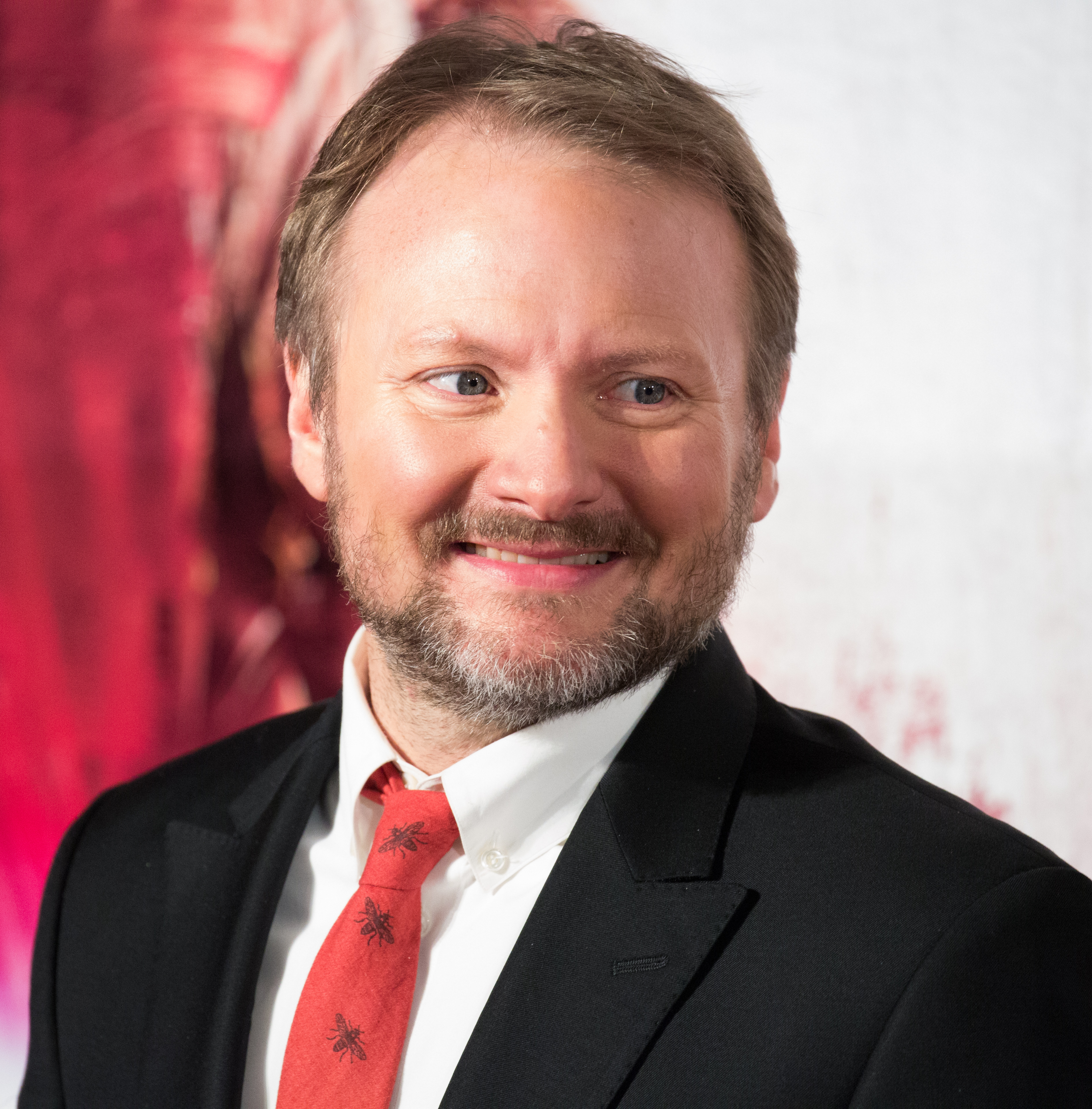
Rose Tico was created by Rian Johnson, the director and writer of Star Wars: The Last Jedi.

Rose Tico was created by Rian Johnson for the film Star Wars: The Last Jedi (2017), which he wrote and directed. While working on the script, he originally had the characters Poe Dameron and Finn go to Canto Bight together, but he decided having a female character accompany Finn would make for a more interesting dynamic because otherwise, "it was just these two dudes on an adventure". Johnson said in the original versions of the script with Poe and Finn together, their dialogue could have been interchangeable and there was no conflict between them. This led him to conceive the Rose Tico character, who, in Johnson's words, could "actually challenge [Finn] and push him and contrast with him was where Rose came from".

Johnson conceived Rose Tico as a relatable audience surrogate, and said he "wanted someone who 10-year-old me would truly be able to relate to, someone who was a genuine nerd, someone who it would be a little surprising that they were front and forward in a Star Wars movie". Details about the character were first discussed at the Star Wars Celebration convention in Orlando, Florida, on April 14, 2017. At the time, she was only referenced by her first name, "Rose"; her last name "Tico" was not revealed until a Vanity Fair article on May 23, 2017. Johnson described Rose Tico as the "biggest new part in the movie", and his favorite new character introduced in the film. Johnson said of the character: "She's not a soldier. She's not looking to be a hero, and she gets pulled a very big way into an adventure in this movie with Finn. … She's pretty rad." Rose has the most screen time of any new character introduced in The Last Jedi.

The name Rose was originally used for the character Maz Kanata during the pre-production of Star Wars: The Force Awakens. The name is a tribute to Rose Gilbert, the late high school English teacher who instructed both Force Awakens director J. J. Abrams and production designer Rick Carter. Several scenes featuring Rose in the initial scripts of The Last Jedi were either cut or altered in later drafts. One notable change was Finn originally being a gunner alongside Paige during her bombing run, witnessing her death. This element was removed in subsequent drafts as director Rian Johnson found it challenging to reconcile with Finn's later relationship with Rose. Additionally, the master codebreaker Rose and Finn sought was originally planned to be an insectoid warlord who involved Rose and Finn in an effort to rob a rival. This led to an extended sequence of Finn, Rose, and the codebreaker's crew climbing atop the casino rooftop during an attempted robbery, which ended with Finn and Rose getting arrested.

=== Casting ===
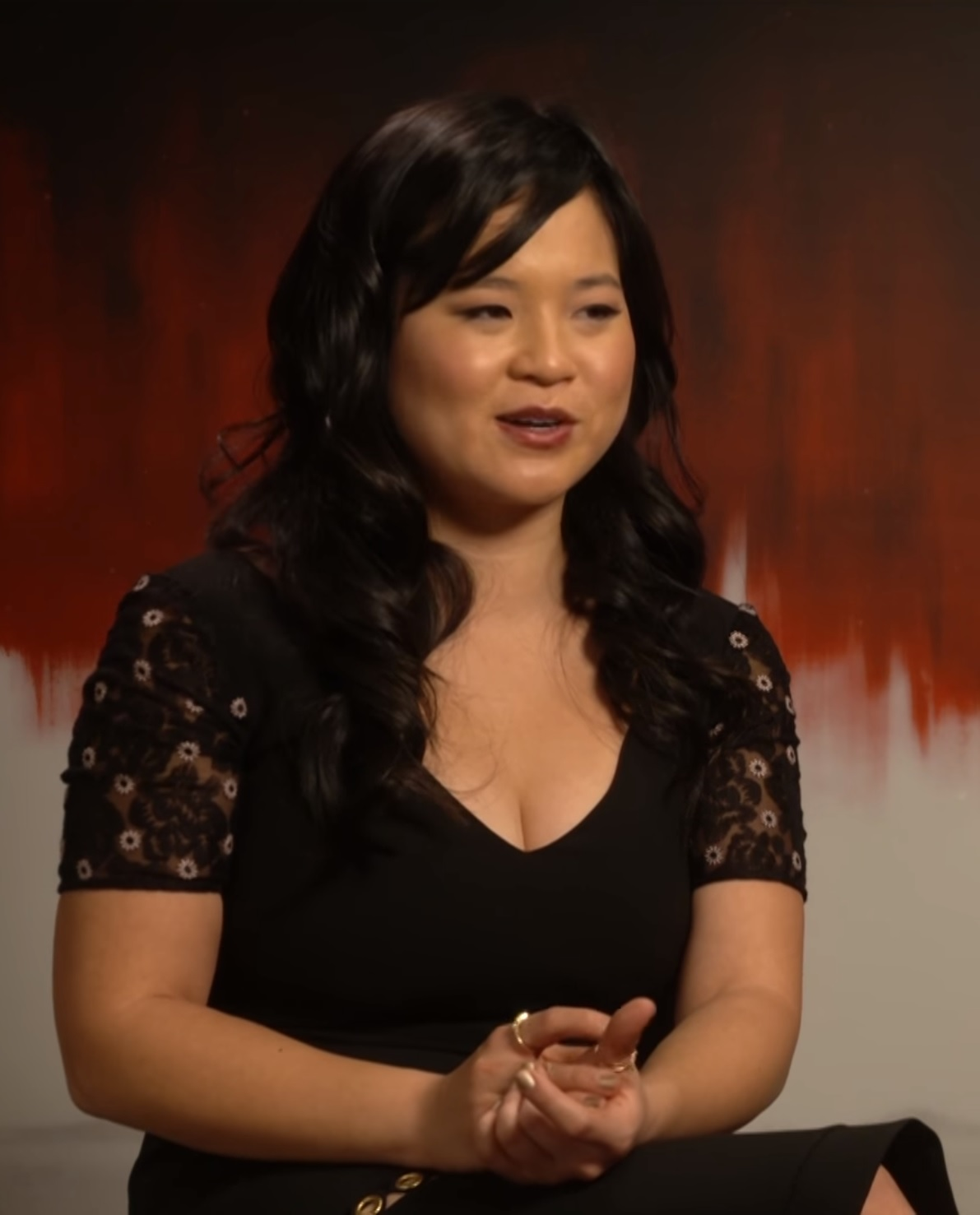
Kelly Marie Tran, who portrayed Rose Tico, was the first woman of color to play a leading role in a Star Wars film.

Kelly Marie Tran spent years struggling to find work and doing temporary jobs on the side, and had considered quitting acting altogether before auditioning for The Last Jedi. Tran was not a Star Wars fan and had never seen a film in the franchise before seeking the role. She believed that ultimately helped her in her audition, because she didn't have pre-established expectations or attempt to model Rose on characters from the previous films. Hundreds of actresses auditioned for the part of Rose Tico. Tran, a Harry Potter fan, wore her lucky Ravenclaw tie to the audition, but later became concerned when the other actresses were wearing more serious attire. Nevertheless, she wore the tie again during her first callback. Tran went through five intense rounds of auditions over five months between the summer and fall of 2015, with one month spanning between each audition. Johnson observed her during her second audition, and immediately liked her; he said watching her felt like seeing the character he pictured in his mind during the writing process. During one of the auditions, Tran did one-on-one reads alongside John Boyega, the actor who portrays Finn, to determine whether the two actors had chemistry and worked well together. Boyega said it was clear from the start of their readings together that Tran was the best actress for the part. The final audition took place in London with full hair, makeup, and costuming. Three weeks later, in November 2015, Johnson met with Tran and offered her the role.

Johnson said of the audition process: "We saw a lot of talented actresses of a very broad range, but honestly, it was more about finding Kelly." Johnson said Tran had an oddball nature and genuine sweetness to her, and he knew audiences would want her character to succeed. He said of the actress: "She has the most open heart of anyone I've ever met and I knew that was going to shine through onscreen." Johnson said her chemistry with Boyega was another main reason she got the part. J. J. Abrams, the producer, co-writer and director of The Force Awakens and The Last Jedi, has said of Tran's casting: "I was grateful to Rian Johnson for so many things that he did, but the greatest for me was casting Kelly Marie." Boyega felt Tran's background in improv comedy and numerous Internet videos ultimately helped Tran bring to the role a light tone necessary for The Last Jedi, despite the seriousness of the narrative. After receiving the part, Kelly Tran watched all the Star Wars films, read several books, and listened to podcasts about it, becoming a fan of the franchise. The casting of Tran was first announced on the official Star Wars website on February 15, 2016, which described the actress as a "talented newcomer". Tran discussed the character for the first time publicly at the Star Wars Celebration convention in Orlando, where she said: "She's part of the Resistance, and she works in maintenance. I can't wait for you to meet her." In later interviews, Tran said she hopes the character will show viewers that "even if you are not born a princess or into a position of privilege, if you are a background player and aren't a frontrunner like a star pilot, you can still make a difference".

I remember what it felt like to not see anyone like myself in books or on film or TV. When you're really young, you tend to fall in love with characters. If you start seeing the same type of character everywhere and realize that they don't look like you, or they don't speak like you, you start wanting to change who you are. That's something that I did when I was a young kid. I'm excited to be a part of this positive change.

— Kelly Marie Tran

The Last Jedi was Tran's first film role. A Vietnamese American, she was the first woman of color to play a leading character in a Star Wars film. Tran said she believes it was important to have a strong female Asian American character in Star Wars because she knows from her own childhood how important it is for young people to see characters like themselves represented in film, television, and books. She said: "A lot of Star Wars fans who are specifically Asian never had a character they could dress up like .. I get very emotional when I see people who are able to identify with this character. That means a lot to me and I don't think it will ever get old." Tran said she felt it was a major responsibility to portray someone viewers would look up to, and she wanted to do the character justice. Johnson was not specifically seeking an Asian American actress for the role, and audition notices indicated they were open to actresses from any ethnicity. In May 2017, Tran posed as Rose on the cover of Vanity Fair, becoming the first Asian American cover to appear on the magazine's cover. In December 2017, Disney arranged for Tran to embark on a press tour in Singapore and her parents' home country of Vietnam to publicize The Last Jedi.

=== Costume design ===
The costume design for Rose Tico was being developed for The Last Jedi before the actress was cast. The crew knew from the early stages that her primary costume would be a basic coverall. Johnson requested that it be "pretty shapeless", and something that either a man or woman could wear. The costume is a variation of the uniform members of the Resistance ground crew wear in The Force Awakens, with minor modifications to give it a slightly different look. The same color from the original uniforms, which costume supervisor David Crossman called "acidy green", was kept for Rose's costume. The original script called for Rose to wear a beautiful gown during the Canto Bight scenes, so she would blend in with the other wealthy clientele. Costume designer Michael Kaplan said the scene was "going to be a big reveal for Rose, going from this frumpy-dumpy coverall to a beautiful gown". This idea was ultimately abandoned, and it was decided that Rose would wear the coverall costume throughout the entire Canto Bight subplot, which had the effect of making Rose and Finn stick out among the crowd. Costume designer Michael Kaplan said of the coverall costume:

It's in her character. She's not someone that has to look good for work. Rose is a no-nonsense character. She just plugs along and she's spunky. So it does work.

Tran wore a form-fitting First Order uniform as a disguise during her The Last Jedi scenes with Finn and the unnamed slicer aboard the Supremacy. Kaplan said the costume crew wanted to choose a color for the costume that would "enhance" Rose, but they were limited to the First Order colors of black, gray, or teal. They chose teal because they wanted to establish her as the highest-ranking officer of the trio.

The idea of the medallions worn by Rose and Paige Tico came from Carrie Fisher, the actress who portrayed General Leia Organa. She insisted to Rian Johnson that the movie needed "space jewelry," with which he agreed. The original script called for the medallions worn by Rose and Paige to be a two-part pendant that could be placed together to form a single image. This was later changed so that both Rose and Paige had identical medallions, but concept artist Matthew Savage said they still have a yin and yang quality about them. Various designs were created for the medallions, but Johnson's favorite was one based on a Celtic reference suggested by set decorator Richard Roberts. That version was ultimately used in the film. Johnson and Kaplan spent a great deal of time debating Rose's hair style, spending days of hair tests and trying multiple wigs. In the end, Tran's real hair was cut into a shape that would look good in a ponytail, but resulted in a mushroom-like shape when taken down.

=== Filming ===
In January 2016, Tran moved to London to begin filming. She was bound by confidentiality agreements not to discuss the character and could not tell anyone that she was working on a Star Wars film, even her own family. Tran told them she was filming an independent movie in Canada; she sent them photos of Canada that she downloaded from Google, and purchased Canadian maple syrup for them as a gift to make the ruse more convincing. To prevent secrets about the film from leaking during filming, Tran and the other actors were driven around the sets in cars with tinted windows, and made to wear black robes so people would not recognize them. On her first day on the Last Jedi set, Tran saw Anthony Daniels performing as C-3PO and hugged him, which she called "the best experience ever". She said it could be difficult at times maintaining her composure and managing her excitement working on a Star Wars set, especially as a fairly new actress. Tran said: "You have to find a way to just do the work and kind of block everything (else) out. But then, C-3PO comes up and you're like, 'Oh.' You're constantly figuring out, 'How can I work in this environment,' but also, 'This is awesome.'"

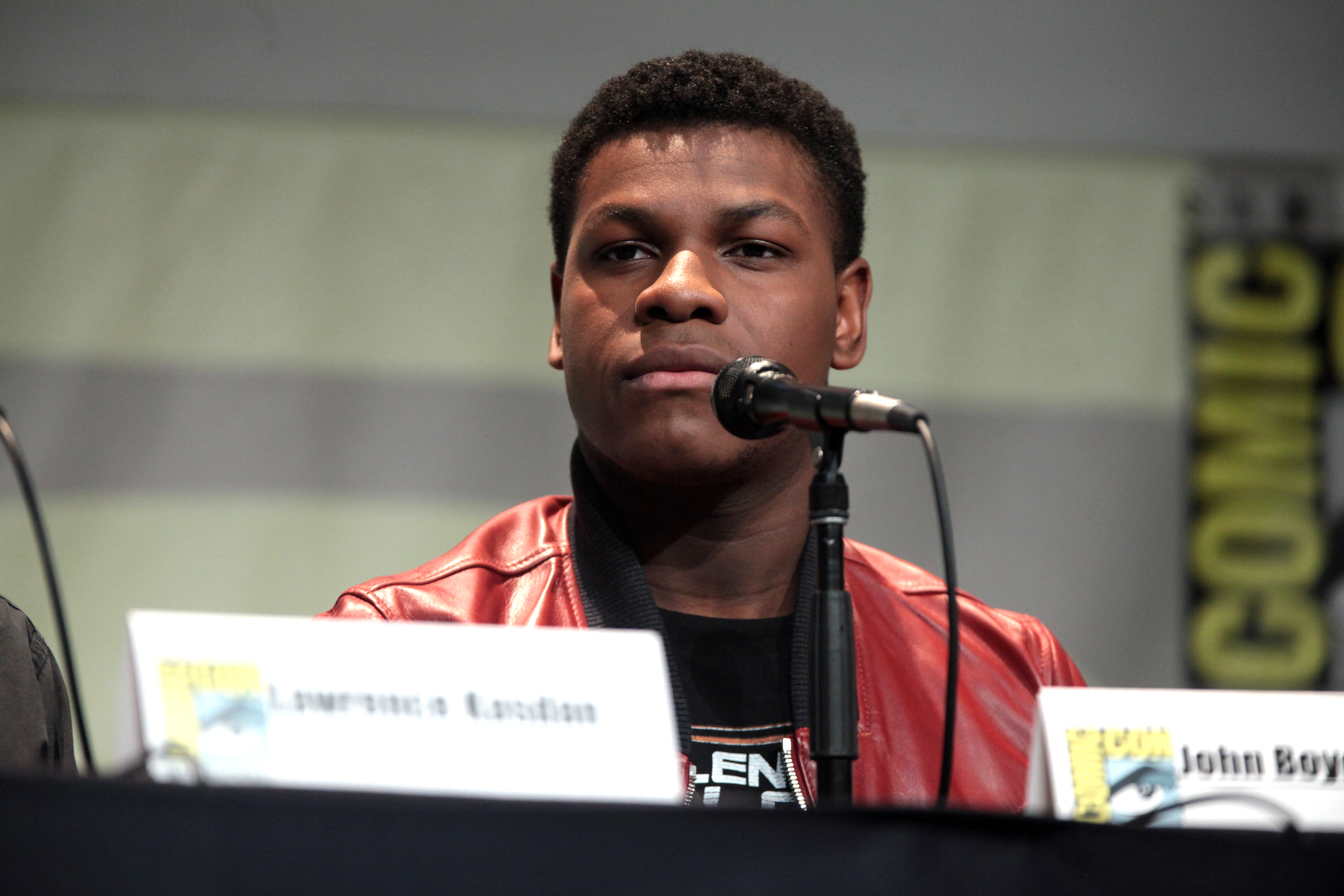
Kelly Marie Tran shared more scenes in The Last Jedi with John Boyega than any other actor, and said he was very easy to work with.

Tran was not used to living without her established support system, and often felt scared and lonely during filming, occasionally crying because she wished her friends could be part of the experience. To combat the isolation, she joined an improvisational theatre class in London, kept journals, and sought companionship from her fellow cast members, especially John Boyega. Tran shared more scenes with Boyega than any other cast member, and she said it was very easy to work with him, and that she learned a lot from him. The two laughed and joked regularly on the set, and occasionally improvised during filming. Tran said of Boyega: "John is someone who I feel like I immediately was able to mesh with. We connect on different levels because our parents are immigrants, we're both people of color, nerds, and he's just hilarious." At one point after filming a scene together, Boyega said to Tran, "Kelly, we are making history," which helped the actress realize the magnitude of appearing in the film. She said of Boyega: "He was the best partner I could have had on a massive movie like this."

Tran said director Rian Johnson made her feel very comfortable on the set and collaborated with her, seeking her thoughts and suggestions about the character. She said: "Rian was so good at inspiring that trust, and I think everyone on set felt as comfortable as me." In early versions of the script, Tran said Rose Tico was "more sarcastic and grumpy", and Johnson compared her to the Winnie-the-Pooh character Eeyore. However, once Tran was cast, the character's personality gradually changed to match that of the actress herself. This is particularly reflected in the excitement and enthusiasm Rose showed during the scene in which she met Finn. In the original script, Rose was immediately suspicious of Finn, but because of the way the character had changed to match Tran's personality, Johnson realized she should admire Finn initially and be excited to meet him. It was one of the few scenes in The Last Jedi that Johnson rewrote during the production. Tran said of developing the character: "Sometimes I think Kelly informed Rose, and sometimes I think Rose informed me. It's such a messy, tangled relationship, which I think is kind of beautiful. She's always going to be part of me and I'm always going to be part of her."

Tran called filming The Last Jedi "the ultimate acting class". She was particularly excited to work with Laura Dern, of whom she was a strong admirer, and Carrie Fisher, who inspired Tran with her confidence and honesty. Tran said she felt Fisher was indirectly protecting her just by virtue of her strong personality. Tran and Boyega were also particularly impressed by Benicio Del Toro, who plays the unnamed slicer that they share multiple scenes with; she said they were obsessed with Del Toro, adding: "Every time he did anything, we would just turn to each other and say, 'He's such a legend!'" Tran enjoyed playing the augmented reality mobile game Pokémon Go on the set of The Last Jedi, and got others on the cast and crew to play it as well, including Johnson and Boyega. Tran shared a physical trainer with Daisy Ridley, the actress who played Rey, and had to follow a difficult fitness regimen, becoming so strong she learned how to push a car. The film's stunt crew taught Tran styles of fighting and how to use various weapons, as well as different types of falls and jumps, including, according to Tran, "how to take a bullet". Tran was so impressed with the work that went into making The Last Jedi that she often visited the set on days when she wasn't performing herself, visiting the art, creature, production design, and costume departments.

Director Rian Johnson expressed nervousness about filming the scene immediately after Rose and Finn first met in The Last Jedi. In this scene, Rose was dragging a stunned Finn away on a cart, and Johnson was concerned about the extensive exposition in the dialogue, fearing it might be challenging to make it effective. However, he credited the acting abilities of Kelly Marie Tran and John Boyega for ultimately making the scene work. The scenes in which Rose and Finn escaped from Canto Bight by riding giant creatures were shot during the final two weeks of filming. The sequence was created by visual effects company Industrial Light & Magic, who planned the animation, then created a motion base that Tran and Boyega rode atop. The base and a motion-controlled camera were programmed to move at a speed and route that matched the planned animation. A handful of scenes involving Rose were filmed, but cut from the final version of The Last Jedi. In one, after Rose and Finn were captured on the Supremacy, General Hux mocked Rose after seeing her medallion, and she responds by biting his finger. Johnson thought it was a good character moment for Rose, but it was cut due to pacing issues. In another deleted scene, after escaping from the Supremacy on a shuttle, Rose and Finn discussed their next destination and ultimately decided to rejoin the Resistance forces on Crait. Dialogue that involved Rose chastising Finn for being too emotionally attached to Rey was also cut from the film.

To understand the mindset of Rose's traumatic past experiences with war, Tran researched her own family's experiences during the Vietnam War; her parents had to flee the country during the conflict, and she had other relatives who tried to escape at the time but could not. She also listened to podcasts about the Vietnam War to learn more about the conflict. Tran felt a connection between Rose's past experiences and those of Tran's own family, particularly the fact that both suffered losses and experienced poverty due to war. Tran said, "A lot of the things (Rose) is dealing with are things that I already had inside me". Tran also listened to podcasts and read books about engineers and how they think, which helped her better understand Tico's role as a mechanic and maintenance worker. Tran did not share any screen time with Veronica Ngo, who played Rose's sister Paige, but they spent time together off-camera and would go to restaurants together and regularly send text messages to each other. Tran felt a connection with Ngo, who is from Vietnam like Tran's family, and Tran helped her with taped auditions for roles Ngo was seeking.

Kelly Marie Tran, who portrayed Rose, considered the moment when Rose kissed Finn as one of her character's bravest moments. She noted that while it's one thing to believe in a cause and fight for it, expressing oneself romantically and being emotionally vulnerable is a different type of courage. Tran acknowledged that portraying a romantic moment was challenging for her, but co-star John Boyega's openness and generosity made the experience easier, especially since it was Tran's first on-screen kiss. Rose's arguably most important and famous line in The Last Jedi was delivered to Finn at the end of the film: "That's how we're going win. Not fighting what we hate. Saving what we love." The line, written by Johnson, was partially inspired by a similar statement made by Irvin Kershner, the director of The Empire Strikes Back (1980), the second film in the original Star Wars trilogy. Describing the difference between the Rebel Alliance and the Galactic Empire in that film, Kershner said: "That's the difference between the Rebels and the Empire. It's possible to fight because you love, not just because you hate." Johnson read the quote in the book Once Upon a Galaxy: A Journal of the Making of The Empire Strikes Back (1980) and incorporated it into The Last Jedi.

After filming wrapped on The Last Jedi, Tran spent a year away from acting, in part to enjoy her last few months of anonymity before her role in Star Wars became widely known. She worked on an endangered wildlife reserve in South Africa, where there was no electricity, running water, or Internet access. Tran later went to Vietnam to work with orphans, and brought her parents back to their home country for the first time since they fled during the Vietnam War forty years earlier.

=== Non-film portrayals ===
Kelly Marie Tran narrates Cobalt Squadron audiobook
Kelly Marie Tran provided the narration for the audiobook version of the novel Star Wars: The Last Jedi: Cobalt Squadron (2017).

The first Rose Tico action figures were revealed by Hasbro on September 1, 2017, as part of a Star Wars merchandising event called "Force Friday". A Funko Pop figurine of the character was released the same day, as was a Lego Star Wars set of the Resistance Transport Pod vehicle that included Lego figurines of Rose, Finn, and BB-8. The novelization of Star Wars: The Last Jedi, written by Jason Fry, includes a moment between Rose and Paige Tico that was not featured in the film, during which Rose says goodbye to Paige before the latter departed for the bombing mission that ultimately kills her. Kelly Marie Tran provided the narration for the audiobook version of Elizabeth E. Wein's Star Wars: The Last Jedi: Cobalt Squadron novel. The audiobook was released on December 15, 2017, the same day as the novel and the Last Jedi film.

Comic book writer Delilah S. Dawson wrote Rose Tico's stories for both the "Rose & Paige" issue of Star Wars: Forces of Destiny comic book series, and the "Rose Knows" story in the Star Wars Adventures comic book series. Rose was illustrated by Nicoletta Baldari in Forces of Destiny, with covers portraying the two title characters by Baldari, penciller Elsa Charretier and colorist Matt Wilson. Artist Derek Charm illustrated the "Rose Knows" comic and one of its covers, while Tim Levins illustrated an alternative cover. Before writing the stories, Dawson read the script for The Last Jedi in November 2016, as well as an early draft of the Cobalt Squadron novel. This gave her an understanding of the personalities and speech patterns of Rose and Paige Tico for her own writing. Dawson was excited to write about the Tico sisters because she was a "huge fan" of the characters and she considered them a strong role model for children, as well as "a study in finding people who lift you up and believe in you and in using that belief to do what you can't do alone". She said of Rose and Paige: "To me, they're the heart of what the Resistance means: ordinary people willing to make sacrifices in the hopes that other people and planets won't have to suffer." Baldari said her illustrations of Rose and Paige was partially inspired by that of Anna and Elsa, sister characters from the Disney animated film Frozen (2013), on which Baladri also worked.

Age of Resistance: Rose Tico was written by Tom Taylor, who specifically requested to write an issue about Rose because she was his son's favorite character. Taylor said of it, "it's probably the best issue, or the one that we feel the closest to".

== Reception ==
=== Critical reception ===
The first Asian-American woman to play a major role in a Star Wars film, Tran is a welcome addition both culturally and narratively, bringing much-appreciated representation to the cinematic universe. She's also a gosh darn delight, diving head-first into the dangerous mission and dragging Finn along.

— Annlee Ellingson, L.A. Biz

The character of Rose Tico and performance by Kelly Marie Tran has received a largely positive reception from critics but mixed reviews from fans, with some commentators calling her the breakout star of The Last Jedi. Katerina Daley of Screen Rant said, based on critic and fan reactions alike, "Rose Tico has quickly gone on to become yet another character in the long line of icons to emerge from Star Wars." Daley praised Rose Tico's vulnerability, wit, strength, and compassion, saying she embodies all the traits that make Star Wars heroes great. The Observer film critic Mark Kermode called Tran's performance "winning" and the Rose Tico character an immediate fan favorite. Alistair Harkness of The Scotsman called Kelly Marie Tran the heart of The Last Jedi, much like John Boyega was for The Force Awakens, and that the two characters are "more interesting to hang out with than some of the more established characters whose adventures we've seen in their prime". Annlee Ellingson of L.A. Biz wrote: "The first Asian-American woman to play a major role in a Star Wars film, Tran is a welcome addition both culturally and narratively, bringing much-appreciated representation to the cinematic universe. She's also a gosh darn delight." Michael Sragow of Film Comment praised Tran's energetic and emotional performance, which he said made Rose the most rousing figure among the film's heroes. Sragow said the character "blows into the movie with a fan's enthusiasm, a can-do spirit, and bracing undercurrents of proletarian rebellion".

Variety's Meredith Woerner said Tran's performance had an energy and passion that energized Star Wars fans. Woerner wrote: "Stealing the spotlight from The Force Awakens favorites, Tran injected the galaxy far, far away with a dose of pure enthusiasm." Anna Menta of Newsweek said Rose Tico "has quickly become a favorite addition to the Star Wars universe", and that Tran's off-camera personality and enthusiasm has helped endeared her even more to fans. Los Angeles Times writer Jen Yamato called Rose Tico an instant fan favorite. Likewise, Matthew Aguilar of Comicbooks.com said Tran already developed a large fanbase among Star Wars fans even before the film was released. Quad-City Times writer Linda Cook called Rose one of her favorite new Star Wars characters, praising her compelling background and relationship with Finn. Pete Hammond of Deadline Hollywood called Rose a great new character and welcome addition to the franchise. The Week culture critic Lili Loofbourow called Rose Tico "one of my favorite additions to the franchise". Metro Silicon Valley writer Richard von Busack described Tran's performance as a show-stealer. Insider writer Kirsten Acuna said Rose, along with Rey, gave young girls and female Star Wars fans a hero to serve as a role model. The Daily Herald included Tran's performance as Rose Tico in its list of 10 great screen performers from 2017, with writer Sean Strangland calling the character "a delight". Film director Jon M. Chu has praised the character and publicly urged the streaming service Disney+ to let him create a television series about Rose.

Richard Trenholm of CNET called Rose delightful to watch, praising her chemistry with Finn and saying she represented the "indomitable moral spirit of Star Wars with her clear-eyed determination to do the right thing". The Stranger writer Andrew Wright said Rose Tico "makes a strong bid for MVP" among the new Star Wars characters introduced in The Last Jedi. David Sims of The Atlantic called Rose a "wonderfully sneaky" character because she initially appears to be a sidekick for Finn, but instead becomes an equal partner who teaches him important lessons. John W. Allman of Creative Loafing called Rose a strong addition with a solid backstory, who elevated and brought a renewed focus to Finn's character. Nerdist writer Rosie Knight called Rose a much-needed addition to the Star Wars universe, and Lindsey Romain, also of Nerdist, said she "represents hope and positivity in a fandom that can often feel overwhelmingly negative". Dominic Griffin of Spectrum Culture wrote that Rose "emerges as a compelling lead equal to the others in emotional resonance". Pam Powell of the San Francisco Daily Journal said Rose shines with personality, with a wonderful sense of humor and timing, and that she pleasantly anticipated seeing her with each scene. The Daily Beast senior entertainment editor Marlow Stern called Tran's performance "a breath of fresh air". Ruben Rosario of MiamiArtzine called Tran's performance charming and relatable. Molly Templeton called Rose an excellent addition to the Star Wars universe. Kirk Baird of The Blade said Tran delivered an "honestly sweet performance". The Atlantic writer Christopher Orr was critical of the Canto Bight sequence, but said Tran's performance helped to enliven it.

Some critics who disliked The Last Jedi were still complimentary toward aspects of Rose Tico's character or Tran's performance. Salon writer Matthew Rozsa, who disliked the film and particularly criticized the Canto Bight sequence, nevertheless noted: "the chemistry between Finn and Rose makes them easily the most likable and sympathetic characters in the film". Similarly, Ryan Syrek of The Reader felt the first half of The Last Jedi was clunky and the subplot involving Finn and Rose's efforts to shut down the tracking device worked poorly, but he said the character dynamics between the two were strong and described Rose his favorite character from the new trilogy. Alyssa Rosenberg, an opinion writer for The Washington Post who was critical of The Last Jedi, said of Kelly Marie Tran: "like nearly everyone in this movie, (she) deserved better writing than she was given". Tor.com writer Emmet Asher-Perrin said the character "deserves more attention than the film is capable of giving her". Chris Gore of Film Threat said he very much liked the Rose character, but found the Canto Bight scenes to be an unnecessary diversion.

Several critics responded negatively to the Canto Bight subplot with Rose and Finn, calling it filler and an unnecessary and distracting element of the film that contributed little to the overall storyline. Other critics were more negative about the Rose Tico character. Gulf News writer Shyama Krishna Kumar called Rose a welcome addition overall, but said she "could have benefited from additional depth". Cinevue writer Christopher Machell described the character as woefully underwritten. Kyle Pinion of The Beat called the character "basically a non-entity", saying she "never seems to grow beyond 'earnest'" and her relationship with Finn felt rushed. Armond White of the National Review calls the relationship between Finn and Rose a politically correct "multi-culti play". Aine O'Connor of the Irish Independent called the Rose and Finn pairing and subplot weak. A writer for The New York Observer felt Finn and Rose had bad chemistry and called their storyline a "misguided side-quest".

=== Backlash ===
The casting of Asian-American actress Kelly Marie Tran as Rose spurred both a racial and misogynistic backlash, including sexist and racist commentary about both Tran and her character, along with insults about her weight, which began immediately after her casting was announced. In a March 2018 interview, Tran said she had been receiving "really acidic, misogynistic, racist comments" regarding her role as Rose Tico. Tran was accused of representing "forced diversity" imposed by "social justice warriors" because of her race. She has been the target of racist trolling on Twitter. In one example, right-wing Internet personality Paul Ray Ramsey mocked Tran's weight. Rose Tico's entry on Wookieepedia, an online encyclopedia about the Star Wars universe, was edited to include racist and vulgar comments in December 2017, which drew national media attention. The wiki's administrators removed the offensive edits and protected the page from editing. Fandom, the wiki hosting service that operated the domain, publicly condemned the vandalism. The character of Rose Tico was defended by the official Star Wars page on Facebook. In response to complaints about the character's actions in The Last Jedi, the Facebook page responded with a list of positive and significant actions done by the character, and wrote: "Personal growth is inherent to every Star Wars story. Without the detour to Canto Bight, Finn wouldn't have grown past only caring about himself and his immediate circle of friends. And Rose wouldn't have discovered her own ability to be the type of hero she idolized."

In June 2018, Tran deleted all of her Instagram posts in response to online harassment, and replaced the account bio with, "Afraid, but doing it anyway." She also pursued therapy following the harassment. Salon writer Nicole Karlis suggested many of the discriminatory attacks came from "white privileged men" afraid of a strong female character who is not hypersexualized in a film, writing: "I can't help but wonder: if Tran's character aligned with the misogynistic and racist stereotype of Asian women as submissive and seductive, would the trolls have still come out?" Esquire writer Dom Nero called the bullying of Tran "another example of the rising current of hatred and discrimination in our culture", and said it came from a "very vocal minority of Star Wars fans who do not agree with the progressive ideals set forth in the refreshingly inclusive, emotionally-nuanced film". A study released in October 2018 found that up to 51% of the attacks Tran received on social media may have come from Russian bots instead of Star Wars fans.

Several cast and crew members of The Last Jedi condemned the attacks and spoke out in defense of Tran, including Rian Johnson, John Boyega, and actors Domhnall Gleeson, and Mark Hamill, who posted a picture of himself with Tran and wrote the caption, "What's not to love? #GetALifeNerds". Johnson branded the attackers as "manbabies", and said they represent a "few unhealthy people" and not the "vast majority" of Star Wars fans. Claudia Gray, an author who had written several Star Wars books, said the attacks against Tran ran counter to the principles of the franchise, and people who did not understand that "were never a Star Wars fan to begin with". Other celebrities have expressed support for Tran as well, including Josh Gad, Kumail Nanjiani, Gabrielle Union, Elijah Wood, and Edgar Wright. Stephen Colbert condemned Tran's attackers during a segment on The Late Show with Stephen Colbert, during which he presented a mock trailer for The Last Jedi specifically designed to make "racist, misogynist nerds" angry. In less than one day, more than 20,000 fans retweeted a message of support for Tran from a fan on Twitter that sought to "drown out the manbabies". Star Wars fans began circulating fan art of Rose Tico on Twitter to show support for Tran, along with the hashtag #FanArtForRose. She was also shown support at the 2018 San Diego Comic-Con during a "Rally for Rose", during which fans appeared in cosplay attire as Rose Tico or wore "Rose for Hope" T-shirts. Fans posted about the event on social media using the hashtags #ForceOutHate and #RallyForRose.

In response to the harassment, Tran penned an essay titled "Kelly Marie Tran: I Won't Be Marginalized by Online Harassment", published in The New York Times on August 21, 2018. She wrote that the attacks reinforced microaggressions she had long faced as a Vietnamese-American, and which sought to reinforce a narrative that Asians should be marginalized and treated only as minor characters, both in stories and in real life. Tran said she even began to believe the negative statements made about her, and that they had sent her down "a spiral of self-hate, into the darkest recesses of my mind, places where I tore myself apart, where I put their words above my own self-worth". She wrote: "Their words reinforced a narrative I had heard my whole life: that I was 'other', that I didn't belong, that I wasn't good enough, simply because I wasn't like them. And that feeling, I realize now, was, and is, shame, a shame for the things that made me different, a shame for the culture from which I came from." She concluded with: "You might know me as Kelly. I am the first woman of color to have a leading role in a Star Wars movie. I am the first Asian woman to appear on the cover of Vanity Fair. My real name is Loan. And I am just getting started." Tran later said the New York Times essay was difficult to write, but also "probably one of the proudest moments of [her] career thus far".

When Tran appeared during a panel about The Rise of Skywalker at the Star Wars Celebration in Chicago on April 12, 2019, she received a swell of support from the crowd, who chanted her name and gave her a standing ovation, causing the actress to tear up onstage. Clarisse Loughrey of The Independent called it "the unexpected highlight of the panel" and wrote: "Tran's reception was not only heartening, it was a moment of pure relief for so many fans of the franchise, worried that the well had finally been poisoned beyond repair."

=== The Rise of Skywalker ===
Prior to the release of The Rise of Skywalker, fans and writers expressed concern about how little Rose Tico had been featured in the film's marketing and merchandising, including her omission from film trailers, as well as her exclusion from posters, clothing, and action figure sets that featured the other Resistance heroes. Several examples of shirts, trading cards, and other memorabilia surfaced in which Rose was not only excluded, but was originally included and later removed. Fans began using the hashtag #WheresRose in protest of her absence, with some calling the move part of a larger trend of erasing women of color from such merchandising. Some writers suggested the decision could be a response to the discriminatory attacks to the Rose Tico character and Tran's performance; Lindsey Romain of Nerdist wrote: "It's also hard not to feel like the racist misogynists are being catered to in these decisions." A set of individual The Rise of Skywalker character posters released on November 20 initially did not include Rose, but a poster featuring her was released the following day.

Following the release of The Rise of Skywalker, Rose's minor role in the film became a major point of criticism among fans and reviewers alike. Rose received one minute and sixteen seconds of screen time in the 142-minute film, much shorter than the ten minutes and fifty-three seconds she received in The Last Jedi, and a shorter amount of time than Rose's sister Paige received in her single scene in The Last Jedi. An early scene in which Rose opts to stay on the Resistance base while Rey, Finn, and Poe go on adventure together was taken by many as a direct response to the audience reception of The Last Jedi and Rose's arc within the film. Tran said in interviews prior to the film's release that she was looking forward to scenes with Rose and Rey together in The Rise of Skywalker, but fans and critics noted that no such scenes appeared in the final cut. Fans expressed disappointment and anger on social media, with the hashtags #JusticeForRose and #RoseTicoDeservedBetter trending on Twitter in the week after the film's release.

Several critics in their reviews of the finished film criticized Rose's minor role, with some calling it a validation of the people who attacked and harassed Tran online. Critics said she was "sidelined" and commented on how she was written out "without any explanation," and her minor role was considered by one critic to be "one of the film's biggest disappointments." Paul Tassi of Forbes called it a "cowardly response to two years of constant abuse of Tran", and sent a negative message that film writers and directors could be influenced by people who express enough hatred and vitriol on the Internet. Vivian Kane of The Mary Sue wrote of J. J. Abrams: "With his treatment of Rose, it's hard to believe he wasn't listening to even the most toxic corners of the internet." Slate writer Violet Kim argued that even if Rose's reduced role was not a response to the harassment, it showed the filmmakers did not understand how deeply her exclusion "would hit those to whom she meant so much". Comic Book Resources writer Anthony Gramuglia stated that Rose's screen time "comes across as a failure to support an actor who was put in a rough situation, as if Disney were throwing her to the wolves". Actor Jimmy Wong tweeted that he was "livid" with the treatment of Rose, pointing out that newly introduced background characters received more dialogue than her.

Mike Reyes of CinemaBlend suggested that other factors could have accounted for Rose's minor role, such as scenes getting cut for pacing purposes, or revisions to the script after screenwriting duties were transferred from original writers Colin Trevorrow and Derek Connolly to J. J. Abrams and Chris Terrio. In an interview, Terrio said the filmmakers were not trying to deliberately sideline Rose in the film, stressing that he and Abrams "adore" Tran. He stated that they wanted Rose to stay behind with Leia while the other characters were away because they wanted one of the principal characters to be an "anchor" for those scenes, which he described as an indication of Rose's importance. Her screen time was cut, Terrio said, because some of the repurposed footage featuring Carrie Fisher did not meet the standard of realism they had hoped for, so they were deleted from the film. When asked on the red carpet of the 2020 Academy Awards about her much shorter role in the film, Tran said she was impressed by how Abrams resolved so many different storylines, adding that "at the end of the day I got to be part of something bigger than me, and that's really special."
