= Star Wars: Leia, Princess of Alderaan =

2017 novel by Claudia Gray

- Author: Claudia Gray
- Audio read by: Saskia Maarleveld
- Language: English
- Series: Journey to Star Wars: The Last Jedi
- Genre: Science fiction
- Publisher: Disney Lucasfilm Press
- Publication date: September 1, 2017
- Publication place: United States
- Media type: Print (Hardcover)
- Pages: 416 (First edition, hardcover)
- ISBN: 978-1-484-78078-7 (First edition, hardcover)

Star Wars: Leia, Princess of Alderaan is a Star Wars novel by Claudia Gray, published by Disney Lucasfilm Press on September 1, 2017, as part of the Journey to Star Wars: The Last Jedi publishing initiative. It chronicles the teen years of Princess Leia before the events of the 1977 film Star Wars, which introduced the character.

== Plot ==
Sixteen-year-old Princess Leia Organa has her Day of Demand, where she demands her right to the crown, in line with Alderaan's traditions. She tells them of the three challenges she needs to do, the Challenge of the Body, in which she will climb one of Alderaan's famous mountains, Appenza Peak, the Challenge of the Mind, in which she is a senator-in-training on Coruscant, and the Challenge of the Heart, in which she will go to planets that need humanitarian aid and give the equipment and food they need. After the ceremony, she finds that her parents, Queen Breha and Viceroy Bail Organa, are too consumed by their duties to pay her much attention. As a politician-in-training in the Apprentice Legislature, Leia organizes her first humanitarian mission to the planet Wobani, a world whose people have been impoverished by the abusive governing of Emperor Palpatine's Galactic Empire. She outwits the Imperial supervisor and finds a legal way to liberate a group of refugees from the planet. After departing, she witnesses the aftermath of an attack on Calderos Station, an Imperial waypoint. Leia takes a pathfinding class with other junior legislators, who include Amilyn Holdo of Gatalenta, and the other Alderaanian apprentice legislator, Kier Domadi. Leia realizes that the Empire has covered up the attack, and her research into possible perpetrators leads to her discovery of a hidden base on Crait, and Bail's revelation that he and Breha are part of a secret cabal working against the interests of the Empire. On another humanitarian mission to Naboo, Leia and Dalné, the Queen of Naboo, are almost killed when Moff Quarsh Panaka is assassinated with a bomb, but Panaka was planning to report her true ancestry to the Emperor before he was killed. He recognized her resemblance to Padme Amidala, who he served under and is Leia's deceased biological mother, meaning the bombing actually saved her life.

Leia learns that her parents' ally Saw Gerrera, the leader of an extremist rebel cell called the Partisans, was responsible for the attack. Though Bail and Breha forbid her involvement in the conspiracy for her own safety, Leia continues her humanitarian missions to worlds they believe are safe. When she is faced with resistance from the proud, frog-like Nal Huttans, Leia negotiates their acceptance of her aid in exchange for a favor to be owed her in the future. She begins gathering information about a planetary abuse on Chasmeene and brings it to Senator Mon Mothma of Chandrila, whom she hopes can publicize it. Mon, however, instructs Leia that the effort is futile. Leia is further enraged when the Empire uses an assignment issued to the Junior Legislature to seize control of a planet for industrial development. The imperious Grand Moff Tarkin seems to suspect that Bail and Breha are somehow involved in the recent turmoil. Tarkin invites himself over to one of their parties, hoping one of the senators will give enough information for them to be arrested. However, Bail, Mon Mothma, and Breha start a staged argument over Bail cheating on Breha, and Leia cries to make the scene more real, resulting in Tarkin leaving the party. As Leia becomes closer to Kier and entrusts him with details of her parents' secret work, they are horrified by the punishment inflicted upon Christophsis, whose leaders had committed similar treason against the Empire.

Leia discovers a hidden shipyard on Paucris Major where old and stolen starships of varying types are being refurbished for use by the conspirators. Tarkin meets with her on a pretext, but she knows he is probing for information on a possible conspiracy, thinking she is vulnerable to his manipulation. Leia passes the test but learns that the Empire is aware of the location of the nascent rebel fleet. With the blessing of Breha and Mon, who cannot disrupt their own schedules for fear of inviting suspicion, Leia moves to warn the rebels. Commandeering a ship chartered by Amilyn, Leia heads for Pamarthe to hide her true destination. Calling in her favor from the Nal Huttan leader, Leia books passage from Pamarthe to the shipyard. She and Amilyn are able to warn Bail, who evacuates the ships and initiates the self-destruct protocol for the repair facilities. Kier arrives, having followed Leia, and his ship is damaged by an explosion from one of the repair facilities before Leia can warn him. She finds Kier dying, and learns that he intended to report the rebels to the Empire to protect Alderaan from retribution. A devastated Leia brings his body back to Alderaan, but leaves the information he collected to be destroyed. Bail and Breha finally bring Leia formally into the conspiracy.

== Publication ==
The novel was announced at the Star Wars Celebration in April 2017, along with two other novels and a comic book miniseries related to the second sequel film, Star Wars: The Last Jedi. It was published on September 1, 2017.

== Impact ==
Gray said of the novel:

This is such an interesting period in Leia's life for me because it's literally the only time she will ever—ever—not be contending with the fate of the entire galaxy ... It was fascinating to ask what Leia was like before she ever went to war, back when she was still somewhat sheltered and figuring herself out.

Leia, Princess of Alderaan sets up the relationships between Leia and other characters seen in the films, including Grand Moff Tarkin, Mon Mothma, Amilyn Holdo, and Quarsh Panaka. Gray explained how Kier Domadi, Leia's first love, compares to the character's future husband, Han Solo:

Although obviously neither Kier nor Leia can know this yet, Kier is basically the anti-Han: He's totally suitable for her, smart and stable, totally dedicated to Alderaan, and a pacifist. That said, he has one thing in common with Han: The belief that Leia ought to get to have a personal life instead of living her duty every hour of the day.

== Reception ==
/Film gave a positive review and wrote: "Gray did more than write a great story – she gave readers an insight into moments that we would never have gotten the chance to see if it weren't for her book." Dork Side of the Force concluded: "Leia is a must read for any Star Wars fan, which will give you them nostalgic feels, so be prepared to be overwhelmed while reading this novel." Comic Book Resources thought the novel "would be the perfect inspiration for a [television] show about a younger Princess Leia [...]".
