= Poe Dameron =

Fictional character in Star Wars

- Star Wars character
- Oscar Isaac as Poe Dameron (Note: Promotional image for The Force Awakens (2015))
- First appearance: The Force Awakens (2015)
- Created by: Lawrence Kasdan; J. J. Abrams; Michael Arndt
- Portrayed by: Oscar Isaac
- Voiced by: Oscar Isaac (Note: Disney Infinity 3.0, Lego Star Wars: The Force Awakens, Star Wars Resistance, Rebels (archival audio)); Lex Lang (Note: Lego Star Wars: The Resistance Rises)

In-universe information
- Titles: Commander; Captain; Acting General
- Occupation: X-wing pilot; Smuggler
- Affiliation: New Republic; Resistance
- Family: Shara Bey (mother); Kes Dameron (father)
- Homeworld: Yavin 4

Poe Dameron is a fictional character in the Star Wars franchise. He was introduced in the 2015 film The Force Awakens, and is portrayed by Oscar Isaac. Poe is an X-wing fighter pilot for the Resistance who inadvertently brings the renegade stormtrooper Finn and the Jakku scavenger Rey into battle against the First Order. The character is featured in The Force Awakens media and merchandising as well as an eponymous comic book series. He returns in the film's sequels The Last Jedi (2017) and The Rise of Skywalker (2019), the animated series Star Wars Resistance (2018–2020) and the television specials The Lego Star Wars Holiday Special (2020), Terrifying Tales (2021) and Summer Vacation (2022). Isaac's performance and the character have received positive reviews, with Poe's characterization being compared to that of Han Solo in the original Star Wars film trilogy.

== Creation ==
During development of The Force Awakens, the character that would become Poe Dameron was referred to as "John Doe" and was envisioned as a black man in his 30s or 40s. At various points he was imagined as a Jedi or a bounty hunter—possibly with a Wookiee sidekick—before being depicted as "a Republic military man." When Oscar Isaac was offered the role, Poe was supposed to die early in the film. J.J. Abrams, the director of The Force Awakens, later rewrote the script so that Poe appears in the entire film. Poe Dameron was named after Abrams's assistant Morgan Dameron.

== Casting and portrayal ==
The Force Awakens received praise for casting women and people of color, including the Guatemalan-born Oscar Isaac. Peter Travers of Rolling Stone wrote that "giving starring roles to a black man, a white woman and a Latino is ... quietly history making". A television spot on Univision that featured Poe was targeted at Spanish-speaking viewers, and included an introduction by Isaac in Spanish. A promotional poster featuring Isaac as Poe was distributed prior to the release of The Force Awakens.

Some of Poe's comedic lines in The Force Awakens were improvised by Isaac.

== Characterization ==
In The Force Awakens, Poe is a skilled X-wing fighter pilot for the Resistance. The son of Rebel Alliance fighters, he is a commander in the Resistance's Starfighter Corps and "one of Leia Organa's most-trusted operatives" who is headstrong and "can fly anything". Isaac described Poe as "the best freaking pilot in the galaxy... He's been sent on a mission by a certain princess, and he ends up coming up across [Finn], and their fates are forever intertwined."

Natalie Zutter and Chris Lough of Tor.com wrote, "Poe is that rare creature who knows exactly what he wants to do with his life." Isaac said of the character in 2015, "Poe's the kind of guy you want in the trenches with you. He's straightforward, he's honest, he's incredibly loyal and he's got some swagger to him." Katy Waldman wrote for Slate, "This is Poe Dameron, star pilot, heartthrob, wiseass, ace leather jacket–bestower, Finn's OTP. When he grins up at [Kylo Ren], all rakish charm and derring-do, we know the movie will be OK." Comic book writer Charles Soule, creator of the 2015 Marvel Comics series Star Wars: Poe Dameron, said of the character, "I think it's his charisma that really defines him, for me. Poe Dameron is one charming fellow. We've seen great pilots before, and great warriors, but his ability to lead and inspire feels pretty fresh to me, as is his somewhat snappy roguishness." Alex Segura, author of Star Wars Poe Dameron: Free Fall, said of Poe, "I love the complexities of the character—he's charming, a bit of a scoundrel, not afraid to bend the rules—but he's also driven by loyalty and legacy, and friendship. He's a hero, but in a world where there is absolute good and absolute evil, Poe is a bit gray." Addressing Poe's early life as explored in Free Fall, Segura said:

Poe feels a lot of responsibility—to his parents' legacy, mainly—and that doesn't always mix well with his own youthful curiosity and desire for adventure. It's the core of Poe's conflict, as he leaves home and sets out on this big adventure—he has to basically see everything through the prism of what his parents would want him to do, and I feel like that's a really universal idea—that we're often trying to square the things with the idea of what's expected of us, and we eventually learn that we have to create our own set of rules while still honoring what came before.

After filming The Last Jedi but before its release, Isaac said in 2017:

Poe is in some ways a surrogate son for Leia. But also I think she sees in him the potential for a truly great leader of the Resistance and beyond ... Poe's arc is one of evolving from a heroic soldier to a seasoned leader, to see beyond the single-mindedness of winning the battle to the larger picture of the future of the galaxy. [Leia], with tough love, wants to push Poe to be more than the badass pilot, to temper his heroic impulses with wisdom and clarity.

== Appearances ==
=== Sequel trilogy ===
==== The Force Awakens ====
Poe is introduced in The Force Awakens (2015), the first film of the sequel trilogy. He is an X-wing fighter pilot and a member of the Resistance. He is sent by General Leia Organa to the planet Jakku to retrieve part of a map that shows the location of her brother, Luke Skywalker. When the First Order arrives on Jakku, Poe hides the map in the droid BB-8 and sends him into the desert. Poe is captured and tortured by Kylo Ren, who is searching for the map. A renegade stormtrooper liberates Poe, and they flee the First Order in a TIE fighter. During their flight, Poe gives the stormtrooper the name Finn. Their ship is hit with missiles, and crashes on Jakku. Finn is ejected from the ship and presumes that Poe is dead when the destroyed craft sinks into the sand. Poe later reappears leading an X-wing squadron in an assault on the First Order. Near the end of the film, he leads an attack on Starkiller Base, personally firing the shots that cause the superweapon to explode. The novelization of The Force Awakens explains that Poe was thrown from the TIE fighter over Jakku and survived. After encountering the Blarina scavenger Naka, he helped him escape from a group of pirates. Naka then helped Poe get to Blowback Town.

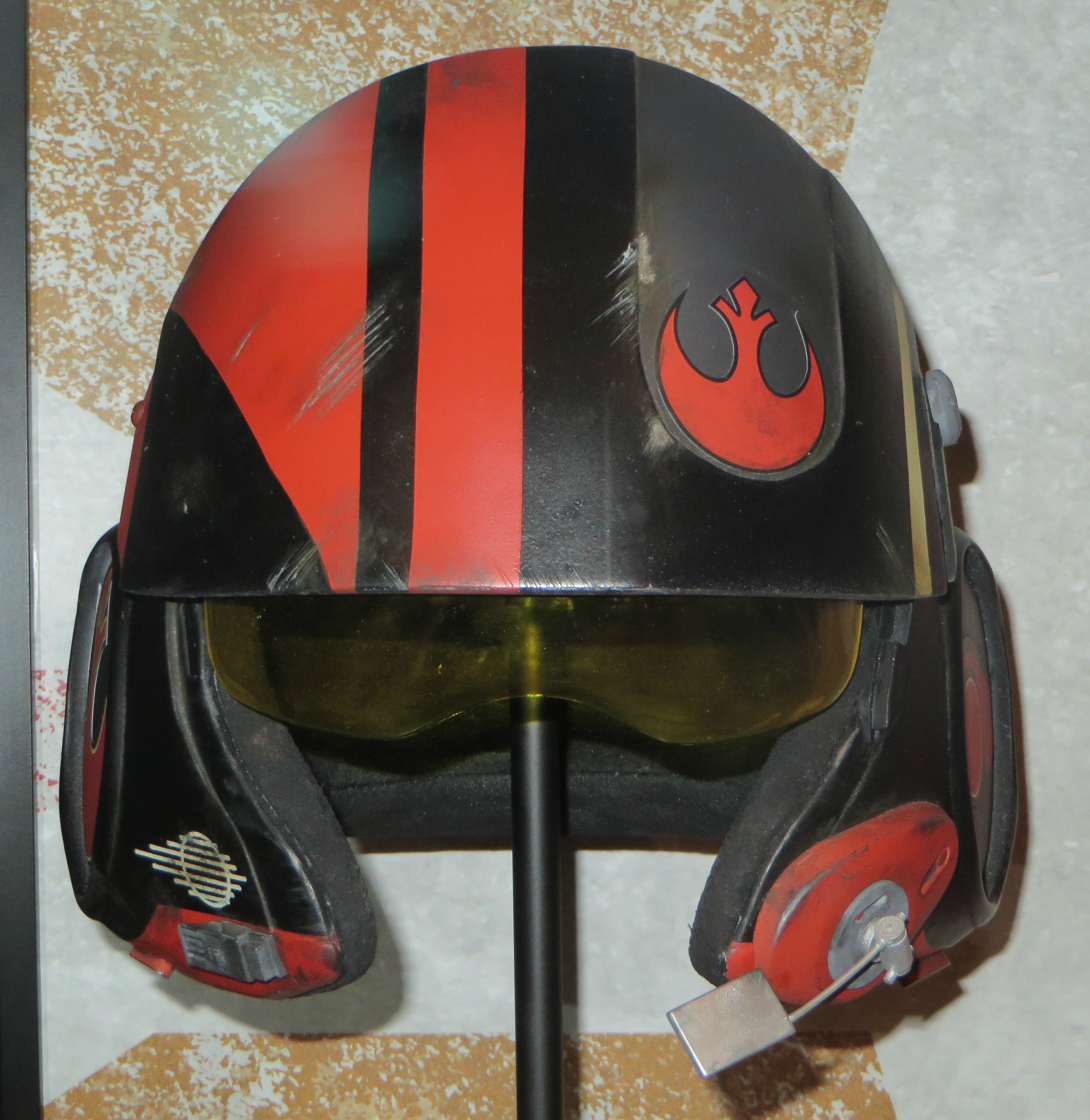
Poe's helmet on display at Star Wars Launch Bay at Disney's Hollywood Studios (2015).

==== The Last Jedi ====
The Last Jedi (2017) begins shortly after the destruction of Starkiller Base. As the First Order closes in on the Resistance headquarters, Poe leads a counterattack to give the Resistance time to evacuate. Once the transports are away, Leia orders Poe to pull back, but he insists that they seize the opportunity to destroy the First Order Dreadnought. His team of bombers succeed in taking out the ship, but all the crews are killed. Leia demotes Poe to Captain for recklessness and disobeying orders. Using a tracking device, the First Order pursues the Resistance through hyperspace and mounts another attack, which claims the lives of most of the Resistance leadership and renders Leia unconscious. Poe assumes he will be named acting general, but Leia instead promotes Vice Admiral Holdo, who dismisses Poe's suggestions due to his earlier reckless actions.

Poe concocts a plan with Finn and the mechanic Rose Tico to disable the tracking device, but keeps the operation a secret from Holdo. When he discovers that Holdo plans to abandon a vulnerable ship, Poe stages a mutiny. Finn and Rose fail to disable the tracker, and an awakened Leia stops Poe's uprising and resumes command. Despite his disobedience, both Leia and Holdo express admiration for Poe's daring. The Resistance forces then arrive on the planet Crait, where Poe leads an unsuccessful offensive against the First Order. While Luke distracts Ren, Poe leads the remaining members of the Resistance in an escape through an uncharted passage.

In The Last Jedi, Poe was originally going to accompany Finn on his mission to Canto Bight. The film's director, Rian Johnson, realized the dialogue of the two characters was interchangeable, which resulted in what he called a "flat" storyline. He created the character Rose to challenge and contrast with Finn, and made her his companion instead.

==== The Rise of Skywalker ====
The Rise of Skywalker (2019) is set one year after the previous film. Poe, Finn and Chewbacca retrieve information from a First Order mole, then travel to Passanna with Rey and C-3PO. There, they locate a Sith dagger which they hope will help them find the planet Exegol and the resurrected Emperor Palpatine, who is the mastermind behind the First Order and has built the Sith Eternal's fleet of Sith Star Destroyers, the Final Order. After Chewbacca's apparent death, they land on Kijimi and meet with Poe's contact Zorii Bliss. She reveals that Poe was a spice smuggler who abandoned his friends and crew when he decided to fly for the Resistance. She still harbors resentment towards him and is on the verge of killing him, but decides to help after Rey defeats her in combat. Zorii takes the group to the droid-smith Babu Frik, who hacks into C-3PO's memory and extracts a translation of the dagger's inscriptions, which provides instructions for locating a Sith wayfinder. Meanwhile, Zorii invites Poe to join her as she travels the galaxy. He considers her offer, but Zorii ultimately urges him to finish what the Resistance has started. She helps him board a First Order Star Destroyer to rescue Chewbacca, who is still alive.

While aboard Ren's Destroyer, Poe and Finn are captured and set to be executed along with Chewbacca. They are saved by General Hux, who reveals that he is the mole; he is aiding the Resistance to undermine Ren. After a series of adventures, Rey departs for Exegol using a wayfinder from Ren's TIE fighter, while Poe and the others return to the Resistance base, where they find that Leia has died. Poe has been named acting general, but struggles with the responsibility. He receives guidance from Lando Calrissian, who encourages him to rely on his friends. Poe subsequently makes Finn his co-general and leads a major strike against the Sith Eternal forces on Exegol. Despite initial success, Poe loses hope when the Resistance seems to be massively outnumbered. However, Lando soon arrives with a fleet of fighter craft from across the galaxy. With the help of this fleet, as well as the deaths of Ren and Palpatine, the Resistance is able to secure victory. Back at the Resistance base, Poe reunites with Zorii, Finn and Rey during a triumphant and emotional celebration.

=== Lego Star Wars ===
The Lego Star Wars Holiday Special is an animated television special released in 2020. In the special, Poe celebrates Life Day with Finn, Max Rebo and Chewbacca's family, unaware that Rey is traveling through time. In the 2021 special Terrifying Tales, Poe and BB-8 make an emergency landing on Mustafar to repair their ship. They encounter the crime lord Graballa the Hutt, who is turning the former castle of Darth Vader into a hotel. While on a tour of the building, Poe listens to the castle's caretaker, Vaneé—a former servant of Vader—tell three wildly inaccurate stories about the various artifacts in the castle. Vaneé then tricks Graballa's young mechanic Dean—revealed to be Force-sensitive—into opening a Sith holocron for him, before donning Sith armor and using the holocron to give himself artificial Force sensitivity. While attempting to kill Poe and several other characters, Vaneé is knocked into lava by Poe and Dean. Impressed by Dean's abilities, Poe offers to bring him to Rey for Jedi training.

=== Literature ===
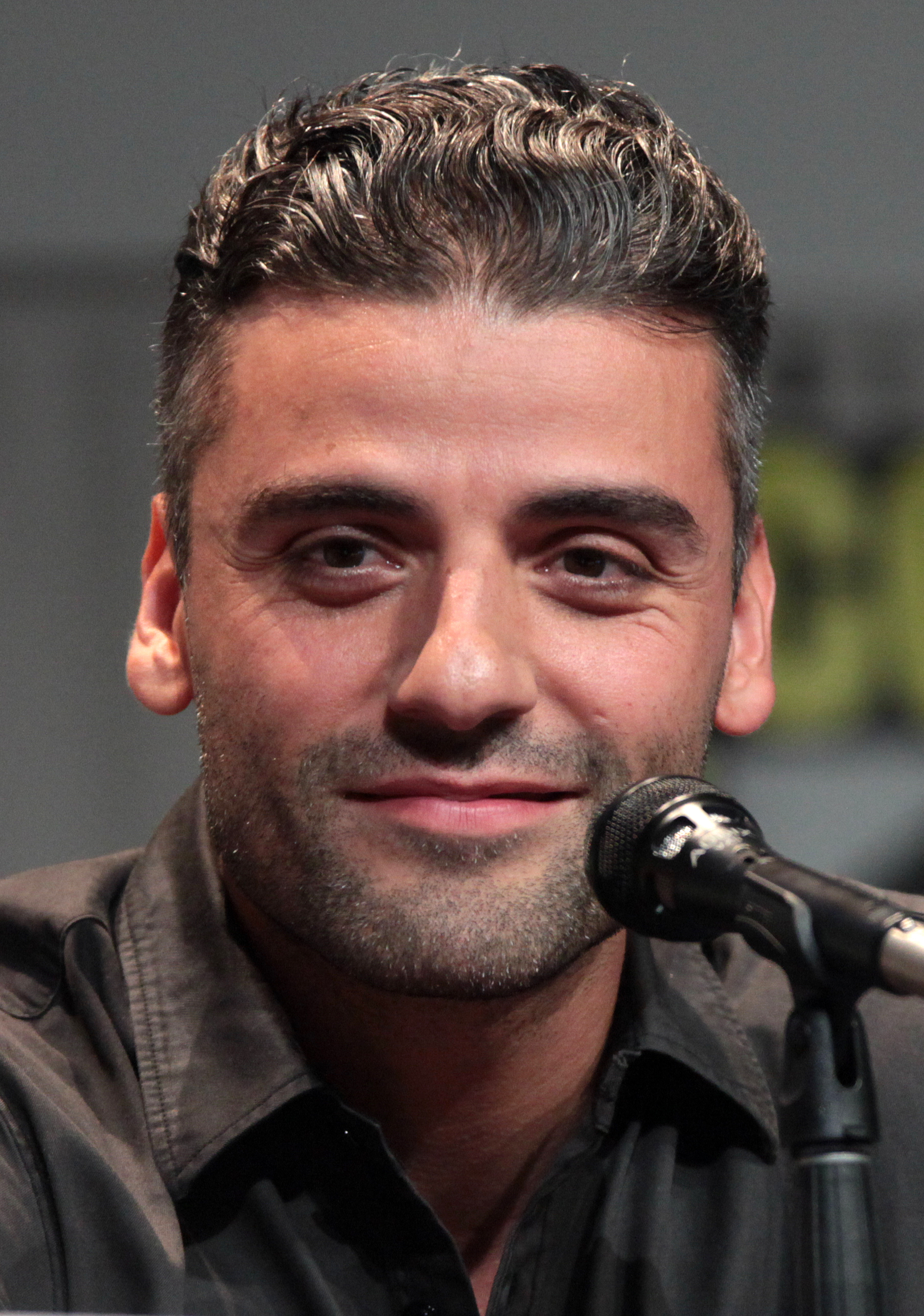
Actor Oscar Isaac at the 2015 San Diego Comic-Con

Poe appears in multiple Star Wars novels and comic books, in particular the Journey to Star Wars line, introduced to connect the Star Wars sequel trilogy with previous film installments.

==== Novels ====
Poe is first mentioned in the young adult novel Moving Target: A Princess Leia Adventure (2015) by Cecil Castellucci and Jason Fry, set between The Empire Strikes Back (1980) and Return of the Jedi (1983). Poe is featured in Star Wars: Before the Awakening (2015) by Greg Rucka, an anthology book for young readers about the lives of Poe, Rey and Finn before the events of The Force Awakens. Star Wars: Resistance Reborn (2019) by Rebecca Roanhorse, covers the rebuilding of the Resistance after the events of The Last Jedi. Star Wars: Poe Dameron: Free Fall by Alex Segura, released on August 4, 2020, explores Poe's early life and connection to Zorii Bliss.

==== Comics ====
Yavin 4, the moon on which the Rebel base was located in the 1977 film Star Wars, was established as Poe's homeworld in the comic series Star Wars: Shattered Empire (2015) after the Guatemalan-born Isaac learned that the shooting location for Yavin 4 had been Tikal, Guatemala. The Shattered Empire series features Poe's parents, members of the Rebel Alliance: his mother is Shara Bey, an A-wing pilot who adventures with Leia, and his father is Kes Dameron, part of a special ground force known as the Pathfinders who are led by Han Solo.

A Marvel comic book series titled Star Wars: Poe Dameron, written by Charles Soule and illustrated by Phil Noto, was published between April 2016 and September 2018. The beginning of the series takes place shortly before The Force Awakens, eventually crossing over with that film's events and going past those of The Last Jedi.

=== Television ===
Poe appears in the 2018 animated TV series Star Wars Resistance, voiced by Isaac. The Lego versions of Poe and BB-8 also appear in the 2016 short form animated series Lego Star Wars: The Resistance Rises, voiced by Lex Lang, and the short Poe Dameron vs the First Order Snowspeeder.

=== Video games ===
Poe is a playable character in the 2015 Force Awakens add-on to the Disney Infinity 3.0 video game, with an Infinity character figurine available separately. He is also a playable character in the video games Star Wars: Galaxy of Heroes (2015), Lego Star Wars: The Force Awakens (2016) and Star Wars: Force Arena (2017). He was also planned to appear in the cancelled mobile game Star Wars: Rivals. His personal X-Wing starfighter is playable in Star Wars: Battlefront II, the sequel to its 2015 reboot.

=== Theme parks ===
Poe Dameron appears in the theme park attractions Star Tours – The Adventures Continue and Star Wars: Rise of the Resistance, with Isaac reprising the role in each instance.

== Reception ==
The character and Isaac's portrayal have received positive reviews. Michael Phillips of the Chicago Tribune wrote, "Oscar Isaac is a primary asset as Poe Dameron ... Like Ford's Han Solo in the original three, he's the guy you want on your team, the one who doesn't take any guff". Robbie Collin of The Telegraph called Poe "a dashing, dry-humoured swashbuckler—in short, he's like Han Solo was 40 years ago". Todd McCarthy of The Hollywood Reporter described the "hotshot" pilot as "a man very much in the Solo mold", and Manohla Dargis of The New York Times wrote that Poe "suggests a next-generation Han". Richard Roeper of the Chicago Sun-Times noted that "Isaac has more than a bit of Han Solo swagger", and Ann Hornaday of The Washington Post said that "Isaac brings just the right amount of cocksure street smarts to his role". Brian Hiatt of Rolling Stone wrote that Poe's "loose, jazzy dialogue was the first, highly welcome clue that these new films would be more human in tone than George Lucas' prequels." The Telegraph also listed Poe's scenes as one of their "14 things Star Wars fans will love about The Force Awakens", writing that they "spark and fizz with energy" and that "while Han Solo will always hold the number one spot, Oscar Isaac's Poe Dameron is definitely a serious contender for the title of Second Coolest Man in the Galaxy". Peter Travers of Rolling Stone wrote that "Isaac oozes flyboy charm". Alex Brown of Tor.com called Poe "the greatest addition to Star Wars canon since Mara Jade", a popular character from the Star Wars expanded universe. Some critics believed that the revelation in The Rise of Skywalker that Poe spent time as a spice smuggler in his youth did not fit with what audiences already knew about the character from his film, television, novel, and comics appearances.

Both Joanna Robinson of Vanity Fair and Scott Mendelson of Forbes noted the chemistry between Poe and Finn (John Boyega), with Brian Truitt of USA Today calling the relationship a "bromance". Their scenes in the film, and Isaac's own comments during an interview with Ellen DeGeneres, have sparked fan and journalistic speculation that Poe could be gay, or be developed as such in future films. (Note: Attributed to multiple references:) Several media outlets reported the wave of fan fiction and fan art created by fan "shippers", or those with a desire to see Poe and Finn in a romantic relationship. (Note: Attributed to multiple references:) Commenting on Isaac's camaraderie with his The Force Awakens cast members, Robinson wrote that "the most important bond Isaac established was with John Boyega. Theirs is a flirtation that launched a thousand pieces of fan fiction." Despite fan support and Isaac's push for a romantic relationship between the characters, such a direction was not pursued in The Rise of Skywalker. Film editor Maryann Brandon, who worked on both The Force Awakens and The Rise of Skywalker, said she did not see a romance develop between the two characters in the footage for the films, noting that she was "not reading as much into it as an audience." Brandon described the characters as the "best of friends. There is a kind of brotherhood there where they understand each other, and they've got each other's back."
