= Vice-Admiral Holdo =

Fictional character in the Star Wars franchise

- Star Wars character
- Laura Dern as Vice-Admiral Holdo
- First appearance: Leia, Princess of Alderaan (2017)
- Last appearance: The Last Jedi (2017)
- Created by: Rian Johnson
- Portrayed by: Laura Dern

In-universe information
- Full name: Amilyn Holdo
- Title: Vice-Admiral
- Occupation: Apprentice legislator (Leia, Princess of Alderaan); Supreme commander of the Resistance (The Last Jedi)
- Affiliation: Galactic Empire (formerly); Rebel Alliance; Resistance
- Homeworld: Gatalenta

Vice-Admiral Amilyn Holdo is a fictional character in the Star Wars franchise. She first appeared in the 2017 novel Star Wars: Leia, Princess of Alderaan, a prequel to Star Wars: The Last Jedi. In the novel, Holdo and Leia Organa meet as teenagers when they are both enrolled in Coruscant's Apprentice Legislature, with Holdo subsequently becoming an important member of the Rebel Alliance. Holdo plays a large supporting role in the film, in which she is portrayed by Laura Dern as a member of Organa's Resistance, as well as a number of Star Wars comics.

== Character ==
In Claudia Gray's novel and comic stories, Amilyn Holdo is depicted as an eccentric yet highly intelligent and competent member of the Rebel Alliance who is frequently underestimated because of her quirks. She is knowledgeable of the esoteric and spiritual practices of her home planet Gatalenta, such as astrology and skyfaring (a type of meditation), and speaks in riddles and strange metaphors. (Leia refers to her distinctive speech patterns as "Holdo speak".) In terms of appearance, Holdo dyes her hair exotic colors, habitually going barefoot, and dressing in flamboyant clothing. Gray said:

She's somebody who's a bit off-kilter, who sees the world through a prism most others don't understand. At first Leia thinks she's pleasant but weird, but as time goes on, it becomes apparent that there's much more to Holdo than you might guess when you first met her. We don't really have a lot of true oddballs in Star Wars, so it was fun to introduce one!

The Last Jedi director Rian Johnson described the character to actress Laura Dern as "someone who is so steadfast that you don't know what side they're on because they don't need the rest of the world to know their plans." Initially, the movie version of Holdo was intended to be very close to her description in the book, described by Johnson as "hippy-dippy"; Dern also compared Holdo to a hippie. However, Johnson thought that Dern's portrayal was "too spacy", so her character's eccentricities were significantly toned down in the final version of the script.

In a 2018 interview, Dern revealed that Holdo is Force-sensitive.

== Appearances ==
=== Leia, Princess of Alderaan ===
Holdo makes her first appearance as a teenage student of the Apprentice Legislature who befriends Leia during a Pathfinding class. Subsequently, she learns about Leia's involvement in the Rebel Alliance, and aids her in her missions. Most notably, Holdo helps Organa safely navigate to the Paucris system to warn the rebels about an impending attack by the Empire.

=== Comic series ===
Holdo appears in a number of Star Wars comic stories. The story "The Right Wrong Turn" in Star Wars Adventures issue 25 revisits Holdo and Leia's teenage friendship, with Amilyn asking Leia to teach her to drive a speeder as a pretext for visiting the dangerous lower levels of Coruscant. In Age of Resistance Special 1 story "The Bridge", she assumes command of a Rebel Alliance starship after the captain is killed by an attacking Imperial warship, and saves the crew by making what will become known as the "Holdo maneuver". In Star Wars: Age of Resistance – Poe Dameron #1, Holdo runs a Resistance spy operation to steal the head of a protocol droid belonging to the New Republic. She is confronted by Poe Dameron, who is at that time a New Republic pilot, but her identity as the thief is never revealed to him, which is why he does not recognize her in The Last Jedi. Holdo makes another appearance in issue #14 of Marvel Comics' Star Wars (2020) series, when she informs Leia about the galactic criminals' plans to sell Han Solo's frozen body at an auction. It is also revealed that Holdo has been working with several galactic crime syndicates in order to secure supply chains for the Rebellion.

=== The Last Jedi ===
By The Last Jedi, Holdo is the Vice-Admiral of the Resistance who temporarily assumes the position of the Supreme Commander while Leia, now a General, is in a coma after an attack by the First Order. There is distrust and tension between Holdo and Poe Dameron because his recklessness led to heavy casualties in the Resistance fleet. Eventually Dameron stages a mutiny against Holdo. After Leia recovers from her injuries and suppresses the mutiny, Holdo has the remaining Resistance members (including Leia) evacuate to the planet Crait via transports while she stays on Leia's flagship, the Raddus. When the First Order begins firing on the fleeing transports, Holdo jumps to hyperspace through Supreme Leader Snoke's flagship, the Supremacy, to defeat the First Order fleet in a suicide attack, which, by the time of The Rise of Skywalker, has been dubbed as the "Holdo maneuver".

== Reception ==
Some critics compared the character from the novels to Luna Lovegood from the Harry Potter series. Her character was analyzed from a feminist perspective, with Valerie Estelle Frankel noting that Holdo possesses "a very different nonlinear [feminine] type of strength".

The film counterpart, portrayed by Laura Dern, was noted as differing from the literary character. Alexandra Stone described the film depiction of Holdo, a "calm, firm leader" differs from the quirky literary character created by Claudia Gray.

With regards to Holdo's appearance in film, Arkady Martine wrote that "women who look like Holdo — femme fatales, even in their middle age, women who... like frivolous things, jewels and bright hair and makeup even in the darkest moments — we are primed to read women like that as women who will betray", and that this "old trope" is eventually subverted when Holdo turns out to be a skilled strategist with "impeccable military credentials" who sacrifices herself for the Resistance. Caitlyn Busch described Dern's character as "a stern, beautiful female character who audiences have never seen before; she swoops in, takes control of the situation, and shames a favorite male character like he's an insolent child".

Naval officer Matt Hipple, writing for The National Interest, analyzed Holdo as an example of "toxic leadership", writing, "Leaders fail when they do not establish expectations, communicate intent, or at minimum engage with key subordinates [...] Vice Admiral Holdo's communication failure forced subordinates to abandon her formal authority for loyalties higher in the hierarchy—the ship, the mission and the cause."
