= Rey (Star Wars) =

Fictional character from Star Wars

- Star Wars character
- Daisy Ridley as Rey in The Rise of Skywalker An editor has nominated the above file for discussion of its purpose and/or potential deletion. You are welcome to participate in the discussion and help reach a consensus.
- First appearance: The Force Awakens (2015)
- Created by: Lawrence Kasdan; J. J. Abrams; Michael Arndt
- Portrayed by: Daisy Ridley (Note: The Force Awakens The Last Jedi The Rise of Skywalker); Cailey Fleming (child) (Note: The Force Awakens The Rise of Skywalker); Josefine Jackson (child) (Note: The Rise of Skywalker)
- Voiced by: Daisy Ridley (Note: Disney Infinity 3.0 Lego Star Wars: The Force Awakens Star Wars Forces of Destiny Star Wars Battlefront II Star Wars Rebels (archival audio)); Helen Sadler (Note: Lego Star Wars: The Resistance Rises Lego Star Wars: The Skywalker Saga)

In-universe information
- Alias: Rey Skywalker (Note: Adopted name)
- Occupation: Scavenger; Jedi
- Affiliation: Resistance; Jedi Order
- Family: Dathan (father) (Note: The novelization of The Rise of Skywalker reveals that Palpatine's son was a failed clone of himself.); Miramir (mother); Sheev Palpatine (grandfather); Unknown great-grandmother (Note: Miramir's grandmother is mentioned in the novel called Shadow of the Sith.)
- Master: Luke Skywalker; Leia Organa
- Homeworld: Jakku

Rey is a fictional character in the Star Wars franchise. She was created by Lawrence Kasdan, J. J. Abrams, and Michael Arndt for The Force Awakens (2015), the first installment of the sequel film trilogy, and is primarily portrayed by Daisy Ridley. (Note: Attributed to multiple references:) Rey also appears in the film's sequels, The Last Jedi (2017) and The Rise of Skywalker (2019), and related Star Wars media.

Rey is introduced as a scavenger who was abandoned as a child on the desert planet Jakku. She becomes an ally of the Resistance in its conflict with the First Order. Powerfully Force-sensitive, Rey trains to be a Jedi under the siblings Luke Skywalker and Leia Organa. She faces adversaries such as Kylo Ren, Supreme Leader Snoke and the resurrected Sith Lord, Emperor Palpatine—who is revealed to be her grandfather in The Rise of Skywalker. Despite being enemies, Rey and Ren share a connection called a "Force dyad" and eventually join forces. Following Palpatine's defeat, Rey adopts the name Rey Skywalker to honor her mentors. For her portrayal of Rey, Ridley was nominated for Best Actress at the 2016 Saturn Awards.

== Creation ==
In 2012, Lucasfilm President Kathleen Kennedy invited Michael Arndt to write three screenplays for the Star Wars sequel trilogy. Intimidated by the scale of the project, Arndt at first turned down the offer. He accepted the writing position, however, after Kennedy explained that the films would tell the origin story of a female Jedi. (Note: Arndt would ultimately serve as a screenwriter for only the first film, and not the two subsequent films in the sequel trilogy.) J.J. Abrams, the director of the first sequel film, was also excited by the idea of a female lead character. According to Kennedy, this character, who was known as "Kira" in the early stages of production, would be "the new generation's Luke Skywalker".

The filmmakers made Rey a scavenger in an attempt to portray her as "the ultimate outsider and the ultimate disenfranchised person". They felt that someone with her background would likely experience a prolonged journey compared to other types of people. Arndt described her as a "loner, hothead, gear-head, badass". He struggled with introducing her as the main character while keeping her from being overshadowed by Luke Skywalker, whose role in the film was eventually minimized.

== Casting and portrayal ==
Abrams wanted to cast a relatively unknown actress so that audiences would not have any preconceived notions about her. Daisy Ridley was suitable, as she had played small roles in television shows, but had only appeared in one other feature film. Ridley auditioned for Rey four or five times over the course of seven months. Throughout the auditions, she felt insecure and doubtful about her ability to land the role. However, Abrams found her funny and thought she had "a great spark". He said she "was born with this gift to be in a moment and make it her own". Kennedy praised Ridley's physicality, self-confidence and optimism, traits she thought were necessary to play Rey. During one audition, Abrams asked Ridley to act out an emotional scene, and she performed it perfectly on the first take. Once Ridley was cast, she had to keep it a secret for three months, until Lucasfilm made an announcement at the end of April 2014. Cailey Fleming was cast as a child version of Rey.

Ridley said her shooting experience started off bumpy, with Abrams describing her first few takes as "wooden". However, she found working with Abrams to be a highly collaborative process. She slowed down her speech to make it easier for audiences to understand her British-accented English, and she felt the slower-paced dialogue made Rey a "softer" character. In an interview shortly before the release of The Force Awakens, Ridley said she hoped Rey would be a "girl power figure". She said that Rey "transcends gender" and expected that both men and women would find her relatable. In an interview with Elle, Ridley called Rey strong, cool, smart, self-reliant and a role model for young girls, who might learn from Rey that they "don't have to show off their bodies".

== Characterization ==
Rey is introduced as a 19-year-old woman in The Force Awakens. According to Matthew Yglesias of Vox, Rey is "less callow" than Luke Skywalker in the original Star Wars film. (Note: Later retitled Star Wars: Episode IV–A New Hope.) Ridley says of the character, "It's not because Rey is strong that she's amazing. It's all the complexities of a human. It's because she is a well-drawn person who is struggling with things and you're with her." Megan Garber of The Atlantic noted Rey's significant skills as a fighter.

Rey is highly Force-sensitive, which is revealed when she is presented with the lightsaber first owned by Anakin Skywalker, then his son Luke. Without training, she is able to use the Force and defeat the powerful Kylo Ren in a duel.

On the mirror-invoking vision Rey experiences in The Last Jedi, writer and director Rian Johnson said that it represents the character learning that she has to connect with herself.

In The Last Jedi, Rey also discovers she has a connection in the Force with Kylo Ren, in which Rian Johnson claims that it was used as a way to make Rey engage with him and get the two characters to talk without fighting each other, to further develop their relationship. Johnson explains that Rey seeing Kylo shirtless during one of these connections shows the increasing intimacy between them during their interactions. In The Rise of Skywalker, it is revealed that this connection makes them two halves of a "dyad" in the Force, and the co-writer of the film, Chris Terrio, explains this relationship as being "sort of soulmate[s] in the Force" and "twins of fate, twins of destiny". Both Johnson and director J.J. Abrams described their relationship as a romance. (Note: Attributed to multiple references:)

John Williams, who composed the musical score for all three Star Wars trilogies, found composing a musical theme for Rey an interesting challenge. He wrote what he called a "mature and thoughtful" musical motif for her, which he felt conveys a strong female adventurer infused with the Force. He added that the "musical grammar" of her theme is not heroic, but carries "an adventurous tone that needs to illustrate empathy".

== Appearances ==
=== The Force Awakens ===
Rey is introduced in the 2015 film The Force Awakens as a young adult who lives on the desert planet Jakku and survives by scavenging machine parts. After rescuing the droid BB-8, she encounters Finn, a former stormtrooper. When Rey and Finn are attacked by the First Order, they steal the Millennium Falcon and escape the planet. The smugglers Han Solo and Chewbacca capture the Falcon in their freighter ship and assert they are its rightful owners. When vengeful mercenaries arrive on the freighter, Rey and the others escape in the Falcon. Impressed by Rey's piloting skills, Han offers her a job on the ship. She declines, saying she must return to Jakku. The group then journeys to Maz Kanata's castle to deliver BB-8 to the Resistance. There, Rey discovers a lightsaber that previously belonged to the Jedi Master Luke Skywalker. Upon touching it, she experiences a powerful vision, which includes an image of her younger self being abandoned on Jakku. Maz tells her that whoever abandoned her will never return, and her only option is to seek out strength in the Force. Feeling overwhelmed, Rey rejects the lightsaber and flees into the forest.

The First Order arrives and attacks Maz's castle. Kylo Ren—a First Order warlord and the son of Han —captures Rey and takes her to Starkiller Base. There, he uses the Force to probe her mind for a map that BB-8 showed her. Rey discovers she can use the Force to resist his efforts and read his emotions. Ren reports to his master, Supreme Leader Snoke, who commands that Rey be brought before him. Meanwhile, Rey escapes and eventually reunites with Finn, Han, and Chewbacca, who have come to disable the shield protecting the base. Han confronts Ren, and Rey watches in horror as Ren kills him.

As Rey and Finn try to escape the base, Ren ambushes them. He seriously injures Finn, then engages in a lightsaber duel with Rey. Initially overpowered, she eventually wounds Ren and flees in the Falcon. The Resistance destroys Starkiller Base, and Rey returns to the Resistance headquarters with Chewbacca and Finn, who is unconscious. While the Resistance celebrates their victory, Rey mourns Han's death with General Leia Organa. Rey decides to seek out Luke, using information about his location provided by BB-8 and R2-D2. When she finds him on the planet Ahch-To, she offers the Jedi Master his lightsaber.

=== The Last Jedi ===
The Last Jedi (2017) begins precisely where the previous film ended. Rey attempts to recruit Luke to the Resistance, but he refuses to help. He eventually agrees to give her a limited amount of training in the Force. Rey demonstrates immense raw strength and a clear temptation toward the dark side of the Force, which reminds Luke of Ren, who was once his student. During this time, Rey feels a connection through the Force with Ren, who tells her that Luke tried to murder him. After one of their conversations, Rey says she can feel conflict within Ren, and becomes determined to bring him back from the dark side. She leaves Ahch-To to meet with him.

When she arrives, Ren takes her prisoner and brings her before Snoke. The Supreme Leader informs her that he created the connection between her and Ren as a way to reach Luke. He tortures Rey and eventually orders Ren to kill her, but Ren kills him instead. Ren and Rey then fight Snoke's guards side by side. After they defeat the guards, Ren asks Rey to join him in creating a new order separate from the legacies of Snoke and Luke. During their conversation, Ren gets Rey to admit that her parents abandoned her. Rey ultimately refuses to take Ren's hand, and uses the Force to summon Luke's lightsaber. Ren also uses the Force to pull the weapon towards him, which destroys it. Rey takes the pieces of the lightsaber and flees.

It is later revealed that Rey returned to the Falcon, then helped the Resistance fight the First Order on Crait. The Resistance loses the battle, and Rey attempts to evacuate the surviving fighters. She uses the Force to remove a barrier of stones, which allows them to escape aboard the Falcon. Rey reunites with Finn and Leia, and meets Poe Dameron for the first time. She senses Luke's death through the Force, and assures Leia that he died with "peace and purpose". Rey asks her how they can rebuild the Resistance, and Leia, gesturing towards Rey, says they have all they need.

=== The Rise of Skywalker ===
The Rise of Skywalker (2019) is set one year after the events of The Last Jedi. Rey is continuing her Jedi training at the Resistance base under the tutelage of Leia. The Resistance discovers that Emperor Palpatine has been resurrected and is manipulating events from the Sith world Exegol. His followers—known as the Sith Eternal—have constructed a massive armada of Sith Star Destroyers called the Final Order. Rey and her companions search for a Sith wayfinder, which can lead them to Exegol. They locate a clue to the location of the wayfinder with the help of Lando Calrissian. Meanwhile, Rey continues communicating with Ren. Through this correspondence, Ren learns where Rey is and pursues her. She confronts him, inadvertently causing Chewbacca to be taken aboard a First Order transport. Attempting to save the Wookiee, Rey accidentally destroys the transport with Force lightning, seemingly killing him. She is stricken, and reveals to Finn that she has seen visions of herself sitting on the Sith throne.

Rey and the others travel to Kijimi and meet with the droid-smith Babu Frik, who extracts the location of the wayfinder from C-3PO's memory. Rey senses Chewbacca is alive and aboard a First Order Star Destroyer, and the group mounts a rescue mission. Rey enters Ren's quarters on the ship, and has visions of her parents being killed. Ren informs her that she is Palpatine's granddaughter, and that her parents Dathan and Miramir lived in anonymity to protect her. Palpatine's assassin Ochi murdered her mother and father, but never found Rey, due to him going to Pasaana after tricked by Miramir when he saw some Aki-Aki beads that she got from Unkar Plutt's shop on Jakku. (Note: As depicted in Shadow of the Sith) Ren also reveals that the connection he shares with Rey is a dyad in the Force. Ren urges her to join him so they can overthrow Palpatine and rule together. Rey refuses and leaves for Kef Bir, where she obtains the wayfinder. Ren arrives, destroys the wayfinder, and duels with Rey. Leia calls to Ren through the Force, and Rey impales him while he is distracted. Rey then uses the Force to heal Ren and confesses that she wanted to take his hand earlier, but the hand of Ben Solo, not Kylo Ren. Rey leaves Ren and departs aboard his ship. Disturbed by her Sith lineage, she travels to Ahch-To, intending to live in exile. However, Luke appears as a Force spirit and encourages her to face Palpatine. He gives her Leia's lightsaber and his X-wing, and she departs for Exegol using the wayfinder from Ren's ship.

Rey transmits her coordinates to the Resistance, allowing them to attack the Sith Eternal forces. She confronts Palpatine, who demands that she kill him out of anger, which will allow him to possess her body. Ren arrives and joins Rey; he has rejected the dark side and has once again become Ben Solo. Palpatine absorbs the life energy of both Rey and Ben, and casts Ren off a high ledge. Weakened, Rey hears the voices of past Jedi, who restore her strength. Palpatine assaults her with Force lightning, but Rey reflects it back at him using Luke and Leia's lightsabers. Palpatine's lightning kills him and Rey collapses, seemingly dead. Ben returns and uses the Force to revive Rey, but the effort drains him; Rey kisses him before he vanishes into the Force. After reuniting with her friends at the Resistance base, Rey travels to Tatooine and buries the Skywalker lightsabers near Luke's childhood home. As she inspects her new yellow lightsaber, a passerby asks for her name. Noticing the Force spirits of Luke and Leia nearby, she responds, "Rey Skywalker".

=== Untitled Rey film ===
At Star Wars Celebration 2023, it was announced that Ridley will reprise the role of Rey in an upcoming film directed by Sharmeen Obaid-Chinoy. The film, which is rumored to be titled New Jedi Order, will take place fifteen years after the events of The Rise of Skywalker, and it will focus on Rey rebuilding the Jedi Order. The film's release date has not been announced.

=== Literature ===
Star Wars: Before the Awakening (2015) is an anthology book for young readers that focuses on the lives of Rey, Finn and Poe before the events of The Force Awakens. Rey's Survival Guide (2015) is a first-person account from Rey's perspective about herself and Jakku. The novelization of The Rise of Skywalker reveals that Rey's father was a nonidentical clone of Palpatine. The 2019 novel Resistance Reborn follows Rey in events leading up to The Rise of Skywalker, while the comic series Star Wars Adventures features a story in which Rey, Finn and Poe fight remnants of the First Order after Palpatine's defeat. (Note: Attributed to multiple references:)

=== Television and series ===
Rey is featured in the web series Forces of Destiny (2017–2018), and makes a brief appearance as a disembodied voice in the season four episode "A World Between Worlds" of the television series Star Wars Rebels. In the episode, which is set 16 years before Rey's birth and 35 years before The Force Awakens, the young Padawan Ezra Bridger hears Rey's voice in the World Between Worlds, a dimension that exists outside of time and space.

Rey is featured in the television film The Lego Star Wars Holiday Special (2020), which is set after the events of The Rise of Skywalker. In the film, Rey finds a crystal that enables her to time travel with BB-8. She encounters Luke, Yoda, Din Djarin and other characters. During her travels, she unwittingly allows Palpatine and Darth Vader to follow her.

=== Video games ===
Rey appears in the video games Disney Infinity 3.0 (2015), Lego Star Wars: The Force Awakens (2016), and Star Wars: Battlefront II (2017), all voiced by Ridley, as well as in the strategy video game Star Wars: Force Arena (2017). Helen Sadler voiced the character in Lego Star Wars: The Resistance Rises, the alpha version of Star Wars Battlefront II, and Lego Star Wars: The Skywalker Saga. The character was also introduced as an outfit in the game Fortnite.

=== Absence from merchandise ===
When The Force Awakens was released, fans noticed a lack of licensed toys featuring Rey, despite her being the film's main protagonist. For example, Hasbro released a version of Monopoly based on The Force Awakens that did not feature Rey. After receiving criticism, Hasbro stated that Rey was withheld to avoid spoilers, and that she would be featured in future toy releases. Paul Southern, the head of Lucasfilm Licensing, said that they wanted to protect the secret that "the Force awakens in Rey" and that her character carries a lightsaber. He said that demand for Rey products was underestimated. Abrams said it was "preposterous and wrong" that Rey was not well-represented in merchandizing. Christopher Johnson of CBBC said he was baffled "that some toy manufacturers don't think that girls want to play with 'superhero' toys and that boys aren't interested in female characters".

== Reception ==
=== General ===
The film critic Richard Roeper described Rey as tough, resourceful, smart and brave, and he called Ridley's portrayal "a breakout performance". Joe Morgenstern of The Wall Street Journal called Rey a warrior with "the stylish ferocity of a kung-fu star". He praised Ridley's acting skill, "verve" and "unassuming glory", and said she was perfectly cast in the role. Adam Howard of MSNBC said he was pleasantly surprised by the strength of Rey as a character, while Casey Cipriani of Bustle called Rey new feminist icon.

Soon after the release of The Force Awakens, the screenwriter Max Landis posted a series of tweets referring to Rey as a Mary Sue—an unrealistically perfect, idealized female character—on the basis of her seemingly natural skills as a mechanic, a fighter, a pilot, and a user of "The Force". Landis's posts drew attention from many Twitter users and resulted in what Caroline Framke of Vox described as a "Twitter war". Echoing Landis, both Tasha Robinson of The Verge and Emily Rome of HitFix described Rey as a "wish-fulfillment" character due to her formidable and unrealistic skills, although Robinson claimed that other Star Wars characters are similarly wish-fulfilling. Rome said Rey is "everything we wanted in a Star Wars female character", but said her ability to master Jedi skills without any training is "the stuff of fan fiction". Landis also compared Rey to characters found in fan fiction.

A number of writers, and Ridley herself, have argued that the term Mary Sue carries an inherent gender bias, and that male characters from the original Star Wars trilogy did not face comparable criticism. Robinson suggested that fans would not be concerned about Rey's "excessive coolness" if she were male. Framke argued that Rey's abilities are not necessarily any more impressive than those of the character of Luke Skywalker, and that fans' instinctive criticism of characters like Rey reflects a double standard in that seemingly perfect male heroes are rarely so criticized. J. J. Abrams stated that "the people who are getting freaked out are the people who are accustomed to [male] privilege, and this is not oppression, this is about fairness." He elaborated, "You can probably look at the first [Star Wars] movie that George [Lucas] did and say that Leia was too outspoken, or she was too tough. Anyone who wants to find a problem with anything can find the problem. The internet seems to be made for that." Adrienne Tyler of Screen Rant argued that Rey's abilities are explained in The Rise of Skywalker as resulting from the pair forming a dyad in the Force, sharing the same fighting capabilities.

Rey's hairstyle attracted attention before and after The Force Awakens was released, being compared to Leia's hairdo from the original film, with debate over whether it would become as popular. Rey has also been compared to the character Nausicaä from the Hayao Miyazaki anime film Nausicaä of the Valley of the Wind (1984).

Some fans criticized Rey's trilogy-wide character arc as insufficient. Fan fiction author Ricca said that tension that was built in the first two films never gets resolved in the last film. She wanted a moment at the end of The Rise of Skywalker in which Rey reacts to and reflects on everything that has happened to her.

Some critics and fans have noted a visual resemblance between Rey's character design to that of Bastila Shan from the video game Star Wars: Knights of the Old Republic, and that her character arc shares thematic similarities with that of Bastila's. (Note: Attributed to multiple references:)

The first Reel Women in Technology Award for a fictional character was awarded to the character Rey.

=== Parentage ===
J.J. Abrams stated that he intentionally withheld Rey's last name and background in The Force Awakens. The question of Rey's parentage was a significant point of discussion before The Rise of Skywalker was released. Many fan theories arose, such as Rey being the daughter of Luke or Han, or being Obi-Wan Kenobi's granddaughter. (Note: Attributed to multiple references:) The theory that she is Luke's daughter was especially prominent, with fans and critics highlighting the similarities between the story arcs of the two characters, Star Wars being a Skywalker saga, Rey having a strong attachment to Luke's lightsaber, and her being exceptionally strong with the Force without any training. (Note: Attributed to multiple references:)

In The Last Jedi, Rey is coaxed by Ren into admitting that her parents were "nobodies". Emily VanDerWerff of Vox equated this scene with Luke finding out that Darth Vader is his father, which was his greatest nightmare. To VanDerWerff, "Rey's greatest nightmare is being no one." She added that while Ren "has every reason to be lying" about this, to her mind it is a good thing that "Rey is the child of nobody of particular importance to the story so far." Josh Spiegel of The Hollywood Reporter stated that although some fans might be disappointed by Ren's revelation, it "fits in perfectly" with the film's through line that one can be "both exceptionally gifted in the Force and also not a Skywalker" because "the spirit of the Jedi extends ... to anyone with a gift and the power to believe."

Before the release of The Rise of Skywalker, Abrams said that "there's more to the story than you've seen," though, according to Ridley, the facts presented in The Last Jedi would not change. Rey being revealed as a Palpatine in The Rise of Skywalker received a mixed reception. Joanna Robinson of Vanity Fair interprets the twist as a rebuttal to the themes presented in Episode VIII, calling it "a blow to those fans who eagerly devoured [Rian] Johnson's message that anyone from anywhere can be a Force-wielding hero". Contrarily, Ryan Britt of Fatherly wrote that the revelation may be resonant for those with a "Dark Side-inclined family," because Rey decides not to play Palpatine's "stupid game", and "when Palpatine's face melts off and the dark side disappears into the ether, a lot of emotional family bullshit goes with it." Inverse similarly argued that the end of the film sees Rey reject "any power her grandfather held over her" and "bury the past", in a completion of the hero's journey.

Following the release of The Rise of Skywalker, Daisy Ridley revealed that the identity of Rey's parents had been in constant flux over the course of the production of the sequel trilogy. According to Ridley, during early production Lucasfilm had been "toying with an Obi-Wan connection" before settling on the idea of her character being a nobody. J. J. Abrams then pitched the idea of Palpatine being Rey's grandfather to Ridley during pre-production on Episode IX, although this aspect of her character "kept changing" even into production. James Hunt of Screen Rant argued that the idea of an Obi-Wan connection "would've been an equally bad decision," because it would still mean the character "is powerful because of her lineage, rather than Rey simply being powerful because the Force chose her. It [would have continued] the focus on nostalgia and trying to connect everything, rather than letting Rey be wholly new." Kathleen Kennedy later clarified that "there were a lot of ideas being thrown around" but that Obi-Wan having offspring "was pretty much off the table".

== See also ==
- Palpatine family
- Skywalker family
