= Darth Bane =

Fictional character in the Star Wars franchise

- Star Wars character
- Darth Bane as he appears on Star Wars: Darth Bane: Path of Destruction (2006)
- First appearance: Star Wars: Episode I – The Phantom Menace (novel) (1999, first mentioned); Star Wars: Jedi vs. Sith (2001, first appearance)
- Created by: George Lucas; Drew Karpyshyn
- Voiced by: Mark Hamill

In-universe information
- Species: Human
- Gender: Male
- Occupation: Dark Lord of the Sith
- Affiliation: Sith
- Homeworld: Apatros (Legends)
- Apprentices: Darth Zannah; Darth Cognus

Darth Bane is a fictional character created by George Lucas in the Star Wars franchise. In the Star Wars universe, Darth Bane is a powerful Sith Lord who lived one thousand years before the events of the films and is known for being the originator of the Sith's Rule of Two, which states: One master and one apprentice can be the only Sith in the galaxy at a time. Before, the Sith empire was structured much like its Jedi counterpart; due to their shortfalls, he created this decree.

In 2014, when Lucasfilm officially rebranded the Star Wars expanded universe as Star Wars Legends, and declared it non-canon to the franchise, most of his appearances, including the comic series Jedi vs. Sith and the novels Darth Bane: Path of Destruction, Darth Bane: Rule of Two and Darth Bane: Dynasty of Evil, ceased to be canon, leaving his only canonical appearances in the sixth season of Star Wars: The Clone Wars, in which his Force ghost is voiced by Mark Hamill, a mention in Star Wars (2020) #20, and a reference in Star Wars: The Rise of Skywalker, in which Darth Sidious claims his body to contain the spirits of all Sith since Bane (a concept introduced in Dynasty of Evil), whose name is among those his acolytes chant.

== Appearances ==
=== Legends ===
==== First appearances ====
The character of Darth Bane, and his Rule of Two, were created by George Lucas as part of his backstory of the Sith he developed for the prequel trilogy. Bane was first mentioned in a deleted scene from Star Wars: Episode I – The Phantom Menace and its novelization as the creator of the Rule of Two. In 2000, The Essential Chronology collated these events with the Battle of Ruusan mentioned in the 1998 novel Dark Forces: Jedi Knight. His first appearances were in 2001 in the Bane of the Sith short story and Jedi vs Sith comic series. The New Essential Guide to Characters (2002) and The New Essential Chronology (2005) provided more details, and attempted to correct inconsistencies between Jedi vs Sith and Bane of the Sith.

==== Jedi vs. Sith (2001) and Path of Destruction; Drew Karpyshyn (2006) ====
Darth Bane's backstory is established in Darth Bane: Path of Destruction by Drew Karpyshyn. He is born as Dessel on the planet Apatros, the son of a miner named Hurst. An abusive alcoholic, Hurst blames the boy for the death of his wife in childbirth, and often calls him the "Bane" of his existence. Bane's father takes him into the mines at a young age where the boy is bullied and abused well into adulthood. With his latent affinity in the dark side of the Force, Bane subconsciously uses this power to kill his father in his sleep.

After he kills a Republic Navy ensign in self-defense, Bane flees Apatros to evade arrest, and joins the armies of the Brotherhood of Darkness, an amassing of Sith Lords and acolytes. His instinctive use of the Force (which he initially believes to be a myth) brings him to the attention of the Sith Lord Kopecz. Dessel is sent to the Brotherhood's Academy on Korriban to be trained in the ways of the dark side. Dessel (who renames himself Bane) becomes a star pupil after killing another student in cold blood. In particular, he attracts the attention of Sirak, the top student at the Korriban Academy.

After Bane realizes that he had indeed killed his father with the dark side, he subconsciously retreats from the Force, losing his power. Bane falls out of favor in the Academy, and is eventually refused any personalized training. Months later, in a vain attempt to reestablish himself, Bane challenges Sirak to a fight and is seriously injured in the ensuing duel.

Bane's training in and ascension to the Sith is detailed in both Path of Destruction and Jedi vs. Sith. As a student, he meets a new apprentice (and former Jedi) named Githany, who secretly plans to use him to bring down Sirak. Githany reestablishes his connection to the dark side by showing him in secret what the Sith Lords are teaching her. Most importantly, and to the dismay of the instructors, Bane studies tomes from the Golden Age of the Sith. He soon realizes that the Brotherhood's teachings are incomplete.

Githany tells Bane that she intends to challenge Sirak, assuming that Bane would offer to assassinate him to spare her. However, Bane surprises her by revealing his intentions to destroy Sirak personally in the dueling ring, and that he had known all along she was using him. During the duel, he seriously wounds his opponent, but stops just short of killing him.

Qordis, the main Sith there, knows of his secret training with Githany. He tells him so, and ends up angering Bane. Bane leaves the academy, hoping to find the secrets of ancient Sith Masters in the Valley of the Dark Lords on Korriban. To his disappointment, however, he finds nothing. He returns to the academy, where Githany lures him to the archives, apparently intending to kill him. When the trap comes to fruition, however, Bane realizes that the trap is actually meant for Sirak. Githany kills Sirak's henchmen, and Bane defeats and kills his old nemesis in a lightsaber duel.

Bane takes the long-abandoned Sith title of Darth, leaves the Brotherhood, and travels to Rakata Prime. There, he discovers a Sith Holocron left behind by Darth Revan. Bane completes his training, learning numerous Sith techniques, including the "thought bomb" designed to kill all Force-sensitive beings in reach. He sends this to Lord Kaan. Bane then devises the "Rule of Two": only two Sith Lords, a master and an apprentice, are allowed to exist at one time ("One to embody power and one to crave it.")

Kaan orders that all of the students on Korriban be made into Lords and brought to battle on Ruusan. Kaan sends Kas'im to bring Bane back to Ruusan to join the Brotherhood on pain of death. Upon meeting his former teacher, Bane considers taking him as an apprentice, but ultimately kills him after being refused. Afterwards, Bane takes it upon himself to destroy the remaining Sith and take on an apprentice to carry on the Sith legacy after him.

Bane sends a staged message to Kaan asking to join the Brotherhood; Githany volunteers to kill Bane. Unknown to Githany, Bane had also sent the thought bomb, supposedly as a token of goodwill. Githany finds Bane, and pretends to accept his offer to join the Brotherhood. Githany slipped him poison in a kiss, and he is rendered violently ill. Barely alive, Bane eventually finds a healer named Caleb and extorts his help by threatening his daughter. Caleb cures Bane of the poison and nurses him back to health.

Bane returns to Ruusan, where Kaan agrees to follow his lead in battle. During meditation, Bane uses his own body and power as a focusing agent to unleash a wave of destruction upon the forests of Ruusan, where the Jedi's Army of Light is hiding. When the other Sith Lords mutiny, an enraged Bane moves to destroy the Brotherhood. He first orders the commander of the space forces to engage the Jedi fleet, leading to the Jedi gaining the upper-hand, and the Sith are forced to retreat. Realizing he is facing defeat, Kaan has a conversation with Bane, where Bane manipulates him to destroy the Jedi with "a thought bomb. However, he deceives Kaan by leaving out the fact that a thought bomb would engulf every force user within the radius upon use, leading to Kaan believing that the Brotherhood would survive the effects. Kaan then retreats to some caves with the other Sith Lords. When the thought bomb detonates, it destroys the Jedi and Sith armies, including Kaan, Githany, and the leader of the Jedi Army of Light, Jedi Master Hoth.

In both Jedi vs. Sith and the end of Path of Destruction, Bane meets a Force-sensitive young girl named Rain, who had been brought to Ruusan by the Jedi. Rain had been travelling with her friend Laa, a native of Ruusan, called a "Bouncer", and had saved Laa from being warped by the Sith destruction to Ruusan. Laa is shot dead by two Jedi troops, because every other Bouncer they had encountered after the destruction caused by Bane and the other Sith had been driven mad. As Bane watches, Rain unintentionally draws on the dark side out of anger and kills the two Jedi soldiers. Bane realizes Rain's potential, and accepts her as his apprentice, Darth Zannah.

==== Darth Bane: Rule of Two (2007) ====
In Darth Bane: Rule of Two, Darth Bane goes to Onderon's moon, Dxun, to scavenge an ancient Sith temple. He leaves Zannah with her first mission: to find her way to Onderon in 10 days by her own cunning and strategy. Bane finds his objective: Freedon Nadd's holocron. During the quest, however, parasites called orbalisks cover his body. He uses the holocron to gain further knowledge of the dark side, as well as information on the orbalisks. He learns that Nadd faced the same problem with the orbalisks, so the Dark Lord before him created a suit that would stop them growing on his face, hands and feet. Meanwhile, his apprentice sabotages a Republic craft and lands in an unknown strip of land which belongs to Dxun's infamous beast Riders. She nearly dies in the attempt, but Bane saves her. Then, the pair goes into hiding on Ambria, establishing illegal contacts through the galaxy through the use of an information broker.

Over the next decade, Zannah acts as Bane's lieutenant, carrying out his orders as she grows stronger in the dark side. He orders her to coerce secession movements to move against the Republic too early; the secessionists are subsequently crushed, both removing threats to the Sith's power and deflecting attention off of the two Sith lords.

After a botched assassination attempt against the Chancellor, Zannah discovers a dark side user, Hetton, who has uncovered the location of a tomb of an ancient Sith on the Deep Core planet of Tython. It is rumored that this tomb contains a Holocron with the key that Bane needs to produce his own. After killing the pseudo Sith, Bane and Zannah set off on their respective missions: to recover the ancient Holocron, and infiltrate the Jedi Archives for information on removing the orbalisks.

Upon arrival on Tython and entering the tomb, Bane is attacked by scores of technobeasts, creations of the ancient Sith to guard her crypt. He eventually defeats them and successfully recovers the Holocron. Zannah is able to obtain the information she needs, but her cover is blown at the last minute by her cousin Tomcat, now a healer in the care of the Jedi. Realizing she will need him to remove the orbalisks, she takes him hostage and heads for Tython, with the Jedi on their trail.

Once Zannah and Tomcat arrive on Tython and warn Bane, they retreat to the interior of the temple, waiting for the attack. When it finally comes, the two sides are evenly matched, despite the Sith being outnumbered. When Bane is about to unleash an attack on the last remaining Jedi, his opponent suspends a Force Shield around him. The lightning bounces off the interior of the shield and cooks Bane alive for seconds, melting his flesh and causing the orbalisk to burrow further into his flesh and release a toxin, resulting in unbearable pain. Bane blacks out and is almost killed by the Jedi, but Zannah saves her master and brings him to Ambria, dragging Tomcat along.

Once there, Tomcat (aka Darovit) creates an agreement between Zannah and Caleb (the healer who helped Bane in the previous novel) designed to ensure their survival. Caleb heals Bane under the assurance that Bane will be arrested and imprisoned by the Jedi Council long before Bane is strong enough to fight back. Darovit then sends a message drone containing their location's coordinates to the Jedi. Also, he disables their ship to ensure that the Sith cannot escape. After several days, Bane awakens, infuriated when he hears that his apprentice has sent a message alerting the Jedi to their presence. Begging her to kill him, he over-exerts himself and passes out again. Zannah kills Caleb and disables Tomcat with a Sith spell of madness. She then hides herself and her Master in a secret compartment under Caleb's bed. When the Jedi arrive, Tomcat attacks them in his delusional state, and he is killed. Finding no other living beings, the Jedi assume they have finally killed the last of the Sith. Zannah nurses Bane back to health — even as she pledges to kill him when her training is complete — and they go back into hiding.

==== Darth Bane: Dynasty of Evil (2010) ====
Ten years later, Darth Bane and Zannah are living on the planet Ciutric IV, disguised as merchants. Bane is growing older and weaker, but Zannah has not yet made any attempt to confront and attempt to battle him. Fearing that she is too weak to pursue his legacy, he starts to search for the lost knowledge of Darth Andeddu, a Dark Lord of the Sith who harbored the secret of eternal life. When Bane discovers that a clue to the secret can be found on the planet Prakith, he distracts Zannah by sending her to Doan to investigate the death of a Jedi Knight.

Zannah knows that, despite his frail appearance, Bane is tremendously powerful and that his frailty might be a trap to lure her into attacking him. Zannah also knows that, if she was to defeat Bane and take on the mantle of the Dark Lord of the Sith, she would need an apprentice of her own. During her investigations on Doan, she meets a Dark Jedi named Set Harth who collects Sith artifacts. After a brief duel, which Set loses, Zannah takes him on as her apprentice.

Meanwhile, Bane arrives on Prakith through a series of hazardous micro-jumps into the Deep Core. He storms Andeddu's temple, which is inhabited by a cult called the Malevolence, and easily recovers the Dark Lord's holocron. On the trip back, Bane is frustrated by the holocron's gatekeeper's stalling and forcefully uses his power to "hack" the holocron, discovering Darth Andeddu's technique of essence transfer, the ability to transfer one's consciousness into another's body. Armed with this knowledge, Bane returns to Ciutric IV expecting to confront Zannah.

During these course of events, Serra, Princess of Doan, discovers that her father has been killed and suspects Bane's survival. She hires an assassin known as the Huntress to capture Bane. On Ciutric IV, the Huntress and a group of mercenaries ambushes Bane, and manages to incapacitate him by a potent nerve poison supplied by Serra's healer knowledge.

While in captivity in the Stone Prison on Doan, Bane is tortured by Serra as revenge for the death of her father. However, Serra's bodyguard and best friend, Lucia, recognizes Bane as Des, commander of the Gloom Walkers who saved her squad multiple times during the Sith Wars. Lucia secretly counteracts the poison restraining Bane, and he successfully breaks out. However, Bane also senses that Zannah had tracked him to Doan and attempts to elude because of his weakened state. Bane runs into Lucia, but their reunion is cut short when Zannah arrives and engages Bane in a duel. Lucia is killed as collateral damage. Despite being weakened and unarmed, Bane is able to hold his own against Zannah.

Serra is initially hesitant about activating the self-destruct system for the prison, but upon discovering Lucia's death, she promptly activates the system. Bane manages to escape from Zannah, and each attempt to escape on different shuttles. Prior to this, Set, who accompanied Zannah, tracks down the aura of Darth Andeddu's holocron among Bane's confiscated possessions. He attempts to escape, but he is waylaid by the Huntress in the shuttle bay. He manages to evade her and escape on a shuttle. The Huntress then encounters Bane, and pledges to become his next apprentice, offering him back his lightsaber and holocron which she stole from his estate.

Bane and the Huntress, now renamed Darth Cognus, follows Serra back to Ambria near Caleb's cottage. The princess, who has now learned to let go of her hatred, calmly awaits Bane and allows Cognus to kill her. Bane then sends a message to Zannah directing her to Ambria to finish their duel.

Zannah arrives and they restart their duel, with Bane now armed. Zannah now knows that she cannot best Bane in combat, so she resolves to utilize her specialty of Sith sorcery. Their fight progresses with Bane pressuring Zannah until Zannah unleashes a mind attack. Bane powers through her illusions, but Zannah reveals her trump card and summons sentient tentacles of pure dark side energy. Bane evades them and rushes Zannah, but his final blow is cut short by a tentacle severing the arm holding his lightsaber. As a last resort, he invokes Darth Andeddu's essence transfer technique to possess Zannah. His body is destroyed and reduced to ash as a side effect of the technique and the two fight a battle of wills within Zannah's body. The fight ends and it is unclear who is the victor. Zannah proclaims : "Darth Bane is gone. I am Darth Zannah, Dark Lord of the Sith and your new Master". Cognus approaches Zannah and proclaims her loyalty to the new Sith Master, as her apprentice. Still, Cognus cannot help but notice as Zannah speaks she was continually clenching and unclenching the fingers of her left hand. Bane's method of halting the tremors that plagued his old body. Bane's essence remains dead, but a part of his influence lives on in Zannah.

In some unknown place, Set has activated Darth Andeddu's holocron and plans to obtain immortality.

==== Legacy (2006) ====
Darth Bane is also featured in Star Wars: Legacy, set 130 years after Return of the Jedi. In #5: Broken, Part 4, Darth Krayt uses a Holocron to summon the long-dead Sith Lords Darth Bane, Darth Nihilus and Darth Andeddu. Bane condemns Krayt for taking more than one apprentice, and prophesies that Krayt's new Sith Empire will collapse when his followers turn on themselves, since in Bane's view the "One Sith" philosophy of Krayt is not an improvement on Bane's Rule of Two.

=== Canon ===
==== Star Wars: The Clone Wars (2014) ====
In the Star Wars: The Clone Wars season six episode "Sacrifice", Darth Bane appears as an apparition to Yoda on the Sith home planet Moraband. He is voiced by Mark Hamill, who portrayed Luke Skywalker in the films. Prior to taking on the role of Bane, Hamill did not know of the character or how Bane fit into the overall arc of Star Wars. His son Nathan knew about the history of the character, however, and was able to explain it to his father once he took on the role. For the portrayal, Dave Filoni recorded Hamill reading his lines using multiple inflections, each portraying different emotions, and then blended all together into the version heard within the episode. Previous to that appearance, the developers of the show had considered and rejected for Darth Bane to appear during the third season's Mortis Trilogy arc alongside Darth Revan, acting as an influence on the Son (an embodiment of the dark side). For now, this serves as Bane's only canon appearance.

Bane was to originally appear, alongside Darth Revan, in the third-season episode "Ghosts of Mortis" as an influence to The Son, an embodiment of the dark side of the Force. Although George Lucas commissioned the scene, he later cut it before the scene could be fully animated.

=== Non-canon ===
==== Star Wars: Galaxy of Heroes (2015) ====
Darth Bane eventually became one of the many playable Star Wars characters in the mobile turn-based role-playing game Star Wars: Galaxy of Heroes, featuring characters from both the mainstream canon timeline established by The Walt Disney Company, along with select Legends characters. He was added during the game's ninth year of operation in 2024, and could only be unlocked through the Conquest mode.

== Relationships ==
=== Mentorship tree ===
Sith Order master-apprentice relationship

Darth Andeddu; Immortal God-King of Prakith (Note: Established in the Darth Bane trilogy (2006–2009), written by Drew Karpyshyn.) (Note: Established in the 2019 film Star Wars: The Rise of Skywalker, written by Chris Terrio and J. J. Abrams.)
Darth Vitiate; Tenebrae Valkorion (Note: Established in the video game series Star Wars: Knights of the Old Republic (2003–2019).)	Darth Traya; Kreia
Exal Kressh	Revan	The Jedi Exile; Meetra Surik
1,000 Generations
Darth Bane; Dessel
Darth Zannah; Rain
Darth Cognus; The Huntress	Set Harth
Darth Millenial	1,000 Years
Prophets of the Dark Side	Darth Tenebrous; Rugess Nome
1,000 Years	Darth Plagueis; Hego Damask	Darth Venamis
Ren (Note: Established in the comic book series Star Wars: The Rise of Kylo Ren (2019–2020), written by Charles Soule.)	Darth Sidious; Sheev Palpatine
Sith Eternal	Supreme Leader; Snoke	Mother Talzin (Note: Established in the television series Star Wars: The Clone Wars (2008–2020).)	Darth Tyranus; Count Dooku	Cylo Directive (Note: Established in the comic book series Darth Vader: Dark Lord of the Sith (2017–2018), written by Kieron Gillen and Charles Soule.)
Kylo Ren; Ben Solo	Maul	Asajj Ventress	General Grievous
Darth Momin	Knights of Ren	Quinlan Vos (Note: Established in the 2015 novel Dark Disciple, written by Christie Golden.)	Pong Krell
Darth Vader; Anakin Skywalker	Ezra Bridger	Savage Opress
Doctor Chelli Lona Aphra	Inquisitorius

== Reception ==
Darth Bane: Path of Destruction reached No. 11 on the New York Times bestseller list on October 15, 2006. Darth Bane: Rule of Two reached 14 on the New York Times bestseller list on January 13, 2008.
