= Fifth Brother =

Fifth Brother may refer to:

- Inspectah Deck (Jason S. Hunter, born 1970), American rapper
- Fifth Brother (Star Wars), a minor character in the Star Wars universe
