= Star Wars: Episode I – The Phantom Menace (novel) =

1999 novelization of the film of the same name by Terry Brooks

The Phantom Menace
- Author: Terry Brooks
- Language: English
- Series: Canon G
- Subject: Star Wars
- Genre: Science fiction
- Publisher: Del Rey
- Publication date: Hardcover: April 21, 1999; Paperback: February 9, 2000
- Publication place: United States
- Media type: Hardcover & Paperback
- Pages: Hardcover: 324; Paperback: 352
- ISBN: 0-345-43411-0
- Preceded by: Darth Maul: Shadow Hunter
- Followed by: Rogue Planet

The Star Wars Episode I: The Phantom Menace (Note: Also published in German: Die dunkle Bedrohung; French: La menace fantome, and Dutch: The Phantom Menace) novelization was written by Terry Brooks and published on April 21, 1999, by Del Rey. It is based on the script of the film of the same name and was released with multiple covers, including Darth Maul, Obi-Wan Kenobi, Anakin Skywalker and Queen Amidala. The unabridged audiobook, published by Random House Audio, is narrated by Alexander Adams. The novelization is part of the 2007 Del Rey collection Star Wars: The Prequel Trilogy.

== Overview ==
Terry Brooks spoke with George Lucas about the background of the novel. Some of the dialogue helps to explain certain scenes in more depth than in the film, and the relationship between Qui-Gon Jinn and Obi-Wan Kenobi is more well established.

== Differences from the film ==
- The novel begins with a podrace on Tatooine, in which Anakin Skywalker crashes Watto's racer. Anakin only mentions this in the film.
- More background for Anakin is given which ties into later comments in the film, such as Anakin's conversation with a pilot about angels, and Anakin's race in which Sebulba causes him to crash Watto's podracer, and an encounter with an injured Tusken Raider.
- Anakin beats up a Rodian named Greedo; this foreshadows Anakin's descent to the dark side. The scene was filmed but cut from the final film.
- When Anakin first meets Padmé Amidala, he tells her he is going to marry her. This may be dialogue from a deleted scene.
- Background for the Sith is given, showing their origin and reasons for wanting revenge against the Jedi. Brooks also covers the story of Darth Bane and how he created the Sith Rule of Two.
- The duel between Qui-Gon Jinn and Darth Maul on Tatooine does not end with Qui-Gon simply jumping onto the ship. Maul leaps up there as well until he is knocked off. This is another deleted scene from the film.
- There is a monologue by Darth Sidious about his plans after the defeat of Darth Maul.
- Yoda's famous quote in the film in which he alerts Anakin of the path to the dark side ("Fear is the path to the dark side. Fear leads to anger. Anger leads to hate. Hate leads to suffering") was altered in the novel to just: "To the dark side, fear leads. To anger and to hate. To suffering."
