= Jedi vs. Sith =

Comic book series

- issue one of the series

Publication information
- Publishing company: Dark Horse Comics
- Subject: Star Wars
- Genre: Science fiction
- Schedule: Monthly
- Format: Limited series
- Release date(s): 18 April 2001 – 19 September 2001
- Country: United States
- Language: English
- No. of issues: 6
- ISBN: ISBN 978-1569716496

Expanded Universe
- Era: Sith
- Series: Jedi vs. Sith
- Galactic Year: 1000 BBY
- Canon: C
- Preceded by: Reunion
- Followed by: All For You

Creative team
- Script writer: Darko Macan
- Cover artist(s): Andrew Robinson
- Penciller(s): Ramon F. Bachs
- Inker(s): Raul Fernandez
- Colorist(s): Chris Blythe
- Letterer(s): Steve Dutro

Star Wars: Jedi vs. Sith is a six-part Star Wars comic series which was released in a trade paperback graphic novel format. It was created by Ramon F. Bachs, Raul Fernandez and Darko Macan. It was published by Dark Horse Comics (and by Titan Books in Britain).

== Creation ==
The events depicted are set in the Star Wars expanded universe about 1000 years before the prequel films.

== Synopsis ==
It tells the story of the Battle of Ruusan, which concludes the New Sith Wars between the Sith and the Jedi. The comic books series depicts the apparent destruction of the Sith order, caused by them using a destructive Force technique called a thought bomb against the Jedi but which ends up destroying the Sith as well. It describes how and why Darth Bane, the sole Sith survivor of the Battle of Ruusan reforms the Sith order into having the one-master-one-apprentice structure known from the films. All these events are seen through the eyes of three children from a backwater planet recruited into the rank of the Jedi, one of whom, Darth Zannah, becomes the first apprentice in the new Sith order.
