= Ren (Star Wars) =

Star Wars character

- Star Wars character
- Ren, as depicted in Star Wars: The Rise of Kylo Ren #1 (February 2020)
- First appearance: Star Wars: The Rise of Kylo Ren #1 (December 18, 2019)
- Created by: Charles Soule; Will Sliney
- Voiced by: Christian Slater

In-universe information
- Species: Human
- Gender: Male
- Title: Ren (lightsaber)
- Occupation: Master of the Knights of Ren
- Affiliation: Knights of Ren; Crimson Dawn; Supreme Leader Snoke

Ren is a fictional character in the Star Wars franchise. Created by writer Charles Soule and artist Will Sliney, he first appeared in Marvel Comics' 2019–2020 Star Wars: The Rise of Kylo Ren comic book series. Ren became a breakout character, appearing in 2021 in the comic series Star Wars: War of the Bounty Hunters and Star Wars: Crimson Reign, and the Disney+ Halloween special Lego Star Wars: Terrifying Tales, voiced by Christian Slater. He is the masked, bodily-scarred master of the "shadow"-wielding Knights of Ren preceding Kylo Ren, allied with Qi'ra and Crimson Dawn during the reign of the Galactic Empire.

Slater's performance as Ren received positive critical reception, leading to interest in him reprising his role in live-action media on Disney+.

== Concept and creation ==
Ren was first alluded to with the presence of Kylo Ren (portrayed by Adam Driver), master of the Knights of Ren, throughout the Star Wars sequel trilogy, first mentioned in Star Wars: The Force Awakens (2015), J. J. Abrams stating that the character (born Ben Solo) "came to the name Kylo Ren when he joined a group called the Knights of Ren."

Driver claimed that he was privy to several details of the Knights of Ren's backstory during the making of the films, with the group originally intended to consist of Kylo and several former students of Luke Skywalker; following the development of Star Wars: The Rise of Skywalker this backstory was discarded, with a new backstory elaborated upon in a prequel graphic novel titled Star Wars: The Rise of Kylo Ren, written by Charles Soule, illustrated by Will Sliney, and published by Marvel Comics from December 18, 2019, to March 11, 2020. The series instead established the Knights of Ren as an existing mercenary group founded by "Ren", a man named for the lightsaber ("ren"), and Kylo Ren's predecessor as the Knights' master.

Soule created Ren to serve as a "foil" to Darth Vader, similarly scarred and burned below the neck, but charismatic and open in personality, embracing his damage rather than hiding it from view. Concept art of Ren was drawn prior to the series' conception by Sliney, who described Ren as "born out of the flames" of war, affiliated with Qi'ra and Crimson Dawn and opposed to both Luke Skywalker and the Galactic Empire, and later reluctantly allied with First Order Supreme Leader Snoke to recruit Ben Solo to his cause.

"I wanted him to read like a charming Darth Vader [who] is charismatic and who is appealing. That's why [Ren's] skin is burned and he sort of looks the way that he does. He's embracing the seductiveness and the damage that the dark side does. Darth Vader, as impressive and imposing and terrifying as he is, is remote and cold and distant because he has the suit surrounding him. Whereas Ren isn't hiding behind it. He's someone you could have a beer with, in theory [with the] entire seductiveness of the dark side poured into one character engineered for Ben Solo [being] Ren, [as the] sort of a charming evil rascal that can be really fun to write".

=== Characterization and portrayal ===
Ren is voiced by Christian Slater in the 2021 Disney+ Halloween special Lego Star Wars: Terrifying Tales segment "The Lost Boy", loosely adapting elements of The Rise of Kylo Ren from the perspective of unreliable narrator Vaneé. Speaking of Slater's casting, Josh Rimes stated that "We knew Christian has always been a big Star Wars fan and has loved what we do in animation. This was the perfect opportunity to bring him in and let him have some fun, with Ken Cunningham doing such a great job stylizing "The Lost Boy" that you really feel the appreciation for movies like The Lost Boys and other '80s horror movies, synth-pop training montage and all. So we asked ourselves, 'Who's a great '80s icon?' And Christian has such an amazing voice, that it felt so right for someone intoxicating and scary, but also just really cool, for Ren." Slater has expressed interest in "do[ing] more" as the character in future Star Wars media, in animated and live-action.

== Appearances ==
=== The Rise of Kylo Ren (2019–2020) ===
Marvel Comics' The Rise of Kylo Ren introduces Ren as the founder and leader of the Knights of Ren, scarred and burned all over his body and concealing his face behind a mask with a number of red markings on his mask and chest. Hearing of the Force-sensitive brothers Karrst and Filin, responsible for over one hundred deaths, Ren leads his Knights to the duo, introducing himself as Ren, named for "the Ren" (lightsaber), and seeking those with access to "the shadow" to join their ranks. Speaking to Kaarst while the Knights massacre surrounding security forces, Ren offers him membership in exchange for a "good death", that of his brother Filin, only for Filin to kill Karrst and request membership in his place, only to be killed by a reluctant Ren due to a lack of Force sensitivity. Sometime later, Ren leads his Knights to an ancient Jedi outpost on Elphrona to loot its treasures, only to find Luke Skywalker, his Padawan Ben Solo, and explorer Lor San Tekka. Disagreeing over the true ownership of the artefacts, Ren and Skywalker ignite their lightsabers as the Knights surround the latter, only to be quickly defeated. Faced with a no-win situation, Ren reveals himself to have activated a kill switch on his lightsaber that will kill them both should it leave his hand, and both he and Skywalker elect to leave each other be. Noticing Solo watching, Ren points out his strength in "the shadow" before removing his helmet and placing it on the ground, telling Solo to contact him if he ever wants to learn about it.

Years later, while preparing to loot a village on Varnak, Ren is contacted by Solo (on the recommendation of Snoke) shortly after the destruction of the latter's Jedi Temple and an apparent attempt on his life by Skywalker, after Solo retrieves Ren's old mask from Elphrona to contact him, and telling him to meet the Knights there. On Varnak, Ren and his Knights met with Solo in a cantina. Realizing his new mask makes Solo feel nervous, Ren takes it off before informing Solo that he would only be accepted in the Knights if he caused "a good death", to which Solo responds with a claim of having killed one of the three fellow students of Skywalker's pursuing, which Ren doubts and ultimately finds to have been a death in self-defence caused by the student in question, Hennix, expressing doubt in Solo's willingness to join their ranks.

While deeming the death as not good enough for membership, as Snoke had vouched for Solo, Ren allows him to accompany the Knights anyway on a mission to the Minemoon of Mimban in search of a relic called a Mindsplinter, gifting him a set of black clothes. Intercepted by a group of miners and learning of the artefact's location with Solo's assistance, Ren and his Knights massacre the miners, shocking Solo, as his pursers Voe and Tai arrive, having followed him through the Force. Voe attacks the Knights, while Tai reasons with Solo over his decision to leave. Witnessing this, Ren snaps Tai's neck, killing him, and telling Solo that Snoke was wrong about him. Enraged, Ben duels Ren before impaling him, providing him the "good death" he asked for. After killing Voe with Ren's lightsaber, Solo turns to find the Knights bowing before him, recognizing him as their new leader.

=== War of the Bounty Hunters and Crimson Reign (2021–2022) ===
War of the Bounty Hunters (2021) and Crimson Reign (2021–2022), also written by Soule with artist Steven Cummings, features a younger Ren and the Knights of Ren, consisting of a much larger group, both masked and unmasked, during the reign of the Galactic Empire, as their services are hired by Qi'ra, a former disciple of Maul, on behalf of her crime syndicate, Crimson Dawn.

=== Terrifying Tales: The Lost Boy (2021) ===
In the present of Lego Star Wars: Terrifying Tales, set shortly after the events of Star Wars: The Rise of Skywalker, Ren's helmet is now in the possession of Darth Vader's former servant Vaneé on Mustafar, who shows it to a stranded Poe Dameron before telling him a story of "The Lost Boy" — Ren meeting Ben Solo; as an unreliable narrator, Vaneé's story of events is wildly inaccurate, depicting Ren (voiced by Christian Slater) upon coming across an isolated and ignored Solo after an argument with his uncle Luke Skywalker, introducing the Knights of Ren as ones who use the "shadow" to take what they want from whoever they want, partying and partaking in acts of wanton violence, before inviting Solo on a joyride, gifting him a helmet and uniform. After partying with the Knights, Ren offers Solo membership if he burns down his uncle's Jedi Temple; after Ben refuses, one of the Knights derisively refers to Solo as a "kylo", a word signifying weakness, leading other members of the Knights to taunt him. After Ren attempts to burn the temple himself, Ben duels and defeats him, before the Knights accept him as their leader. In the present, after finishing telling Dameron the story and tricking Force-sensitive child Dean into opening a Sith holocron for him, Vaneé dons armour and Ren's helmet, using the holocron to give himself artificial Force sensitivity, before being knocked into lava by Dameron and Dean; unbeknownst to both, Vaneé survives, with Ren's helmet intact.
