= Will Sliney =

Irish comic books artist

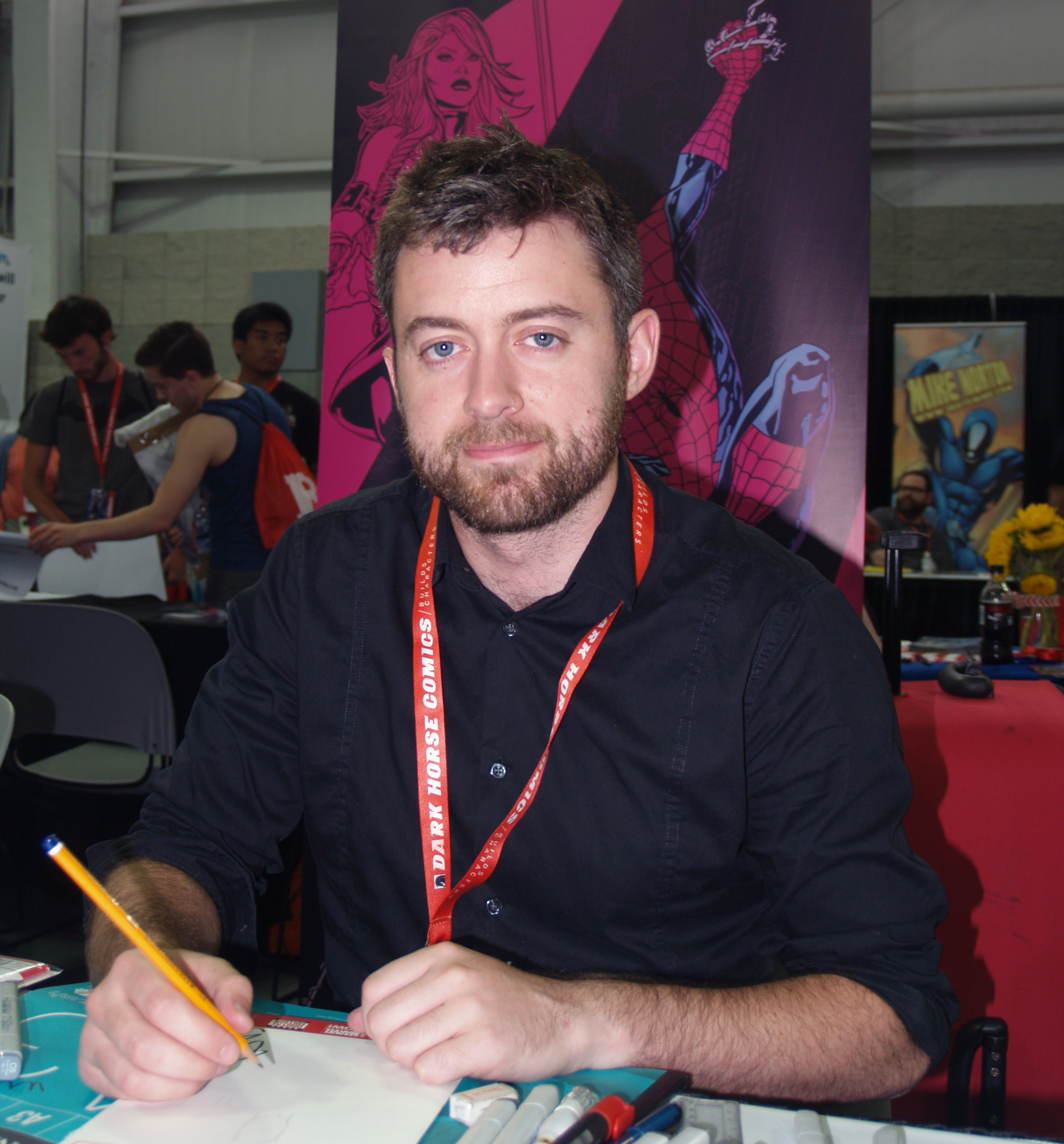
- Comic artist Will Sliney
- Areas: Penciller, Inker, Letterer

Will Sliney is an Irish comic books artist. He is known as the co-creator of the Star Wars character Ren, and for his work on comic books such as the Marvel's Fearless Defenders series, the graphic novel Celtic Warrior: The Legend of Cú Chulainn, and the monthly series Spider-Man 2099.

== Early life ==
Will Sliney is from Ballycotton in County Cork and went to Cork Institute of Technology where he graduated in Multimedia.

== Career ==
Sliney's career began in Irish and UK small press publications before moving to create art for Farscape and Star Wars comics. He later began working Marvel Comics.

From March 2020, during the COVID-19 pandemic in the Republic of Ireland, Sliney has presented short drawing lessons in the "We Will Draw" segment of RTÉ Television's Home School Hub.

== Personal life ==
He proposed to his girlfriend in September 2015 and their first son was born in August 2018.

Sliney is a volunteer for the Royal National Lifeboat Institution (RNLI) based locally. He once rescued an exhausted dolphin who became stranded in the bogland at Ballinamona. He is also a long time Everton fan and has created art for them.

== Bibliography ==
- A+X (2012)
- All-New X-Factor (2014)
- All-New, All Different Marvel Universe (2016)
- The Amazing Spider-Man (2014)
- The Amazing Spider-Man (2015)
- The Astonishing Spider-Man (2015)
- Atomic Rocket Group 66 (2007)
- Avengers [GER] (2013)
- Axis: Carnage and Hobgoblin (2015)
- AXIS: Hobgoblin (2014)
- Castle: Unholy Storm (2014)
- Celtic Warrior: The Legend of Cú Chulainn (2013)
- Farscape (2009)
- Farscape: Strange Detractors (2009)
- Fearless Defenders (2013)
- FutureQuake (2003)
- Infinity Companion (2014)
- MacGyver: Fugitive Gauntlet (2012)
- Marvel Free Previews Secret Wars (2015)
- Marvel Now! Omnibus (2013)
- Marvel Now! Previews (2012)
- Pigs (2011)
- Revolutionary War (2014)
- Revolutionary War: Knights of Pendragon (2014)
- Secret Wars 2099 (2015)
- Spider-Man 2099 (2014)
- Spider-Man 2099 (2015)
- Spider-Verse (2015)
- Star Wars: The Clone Wars (2010)
- Steed and Mrs. Peel [II] (2012)
- The Superior Foes of Spider-Man (2013)
- Superior Spider-Man(2013)
- Superior Spider-Man Team-Up (2013)
