= Lego Star Wars: Terrifying Tales =

2021 animated Star Wars special

- Genre: Animation; Space opera
- Based on: Star Wars by George Lucas
- Developed by: David Shayne; James Waugh; Jason Cosler; Josh Rimes; Leland Chee
- Written by: David Shayne
- Directed by: Ken Cunningham
- Starring: Christian Slater; Dana Snyder; Jake Green; Mary Elizabeth McGlynn; Raphael Alejandro; Tony Hale
- Composer: Michael Kramer
- Country of origin: United States
- Original language: English

Production
- Executive producers: Jason Cosler; Jacqui Lopez; Keith Malone; Josh Rimes; David Shayne; Jason D. Stein; Jennifer Twiner McCarron; James Waugh; Jill Wilfert
- Producers: Daniel Cavey; Dan Langlois
- Editor: Damon Fulford
- Running time: 44 minutes
- Production companies: Lucasfilm Animation; The Lego Group; Atomic Cartoons

Original release
- Network: Disney+
- Release: October 1, 2021

Related
- The Lego Star Wars Holiday Special; Lego Star Wars: Summer Vacation

Lego Star Wars: Terrifying Tales is a 2021 animated special based on the Star Wars franchise, and produced by Lucasfilm Animation and The Lego Group alongside Atomic Cartoons. Like The Lego Star Wars Holiday Special, it is directed by Ken Cunningham from a script written by David Shayne. A stand-alone sequel to the Star Wars sequel trilogy, the special was released on Disney+ on October 1, 2021.

== Plot ==
Prior to the events of the original trilogy, Emperor Palpatine and Darth Vader assign Vader's loyal servant Vaneé with looking after Castle Vader on the volcanic planet Mustafar in their absence. Following the events of Star Wars: The Rise of Skywalker, Poe Dameron and BB-8 make an emergency landing on Mustafar, where they meet Graballa the Hutt. The crime boss has purchased Castle Vader and is renovating it into the galaxy's first all-inclusive Sith-inspired luxury hotel. Graballa is also accompanied by his minions Baash and Raam, and his young mechanic Dean. Dean, who has aspirations of becoming a pilot, strikes a friendship with Poe.

In return for hiring Dean to repair Poe's X-wing, Graballa convinces Poe to record a video promoting Castle Vader. While waiting for his X-wing to be repaired, Poe meets the castle's caretaker Vaneé an his assistant droid NI-L8. Vaneé convinces Poe, BB-8, Graballa, Baash, Raam and Dean to go on a tour of the mysterious castle. During the tour, Vaneé shares three creepy stories linked to ancient artifacts and iconic villains from across all eras of Star Wars.

For the first story, Vaneé uses the helmet Ren to tell the story of how Ben Solo was corrupted by Ren, the leader of the Knights of Ren. Growing impatient with his uncle Luke Skywalker's training, Ben goes joy-riding with the Knights of Ren. When Ben returns to Luke's Jedi Temple, Ren tries to force him to burn his uncle's temple as part of a rite of passage to joining the Knights of Ren. When Ben refuses, the Knights mock him, causing Ben to lose his temper and fight Ren. Ben uses the dark side to triumph over Ren, using rocks to crush him to death. The Knights of Ren submit to Ben.

In the present, Vaneé convinces the Force-sensitive Dean to unlock a vault, where the caretaker retrieves an ancient Sith lightsaber known as the Saber of Scardont. Poe learns that Dean is fearful of losing his job after his mother's business was destroyed by the First Order. Using the relic, Vaneé tells a second story about the cybernetic Maul competing with General Grievous to gain control of the Saber of Scardont in order to curry the favour of Palpatine. Maul wins the quest but the weapon is damaged in the process. A displeased Palpatine casts him out.

Under the influence of the dark side, Dean unlocks the Temple of Mustafar, which contains a Sith holocron. Using the Sith holocron, Vaneé tells the story of the Wookiee's paw, which is based on The Monkey's Paw. In an alternate retelling of A New Hope, Luke Skywalker gains a Wookiee's paw which grants him several wishes including joining the Empire, reuniting with his father Darth Vader and becoming his Sith apprentice. The Battle of Yavin plays out differently with Luke and Vader pursuing Princess Leia and Obi-Wan Kenobi through the Death Star trench run. While attempting to destroy the rebel fights, Luke ends up destroying the Death Star.

In the present, Poe warns Dean that Vaneé's account of Luke Skywalker is inaccurate. Vaneé convinces Dean to unlock the holocron, which he uses to form a suit of armor with various Sith artifacts including Ren's helmet and the Saber of Scardont. Poe, BB-8 and Dean battle Vaneé and his army of battle droids. Following a climactic battle, Vaneé falls into the lava pit while attempting to retrieve his Sith holocron. To avoid the corrupting influence of Castle Vader's Sith heritage, Poe convinces Graballa and his minions to abandon the castle. Poe recruits Dean as a Resistance pilot and offers to introduce him to Rey. A maniacal Vaneé is revealed to have survived his fall.

== Voice cast ==
- A.J. LoCascio as Han Solo, Imperial Pilot
- Barbara Goodson as Mother Talzin
- Christian Slater as Ren
- Dana Snyder as Graballa the Hutt
- Danny Jacobs as Raam, Watto, Protocol Droid
- David Acord as Medical Droid, Rebel Pilot
- Eric Bauza as Luke Skywalker, Guard Droid
- Jake Green as Poe Dameron, Motti
- James Arnold Taylor as Obi-Wan Kenobi, Cozler
- John DiMaggio as Baash, Uncle Owen
- Mary Elizabeth McGlynn as NI-L8, Red 10
- Matt Sloan as Darth Vader
- Matthew Wood as Ben Solo / Kylo Ren, General Grievous, Battle droids
- Raphael Alejandro as Dean
- Sam Witwer as Darth Maul, Trudgen
- Shelby Young as Princess Leia Organa
- Tony Hale as Vaneé
- Trevor Devall as Emperor Palpatine, Grand Moff Tarkin

== Release ==
It was released on October 1, 2021, exclusively on Disney+.

== Reception ==
The review aggregator website Rotten Tomatoes reported an approval rating of 100%, based on 5 reviews.
