= Supreme Leader Snoke =

Star Wars character

- Star Wars character
- Supreme Leader Snoke as a hologram (Note: The Force Awakens (2015))
- First appearance: The Force Awakens (2015)
- Last appearance: The Last Jedi (2017)
- Created by: J. J. Abrams; Lawrence Kasdan; Michael Arndt
- Portrayed by: Andy Serkis
- Voiced by: Andy Serkis (Note: The Rise of Skywalker (2019))

In-universe information
- Full name: Snoke
- Species: Strandcast (artificial being)
- Gender: Male
- Title: Supreme Leader of the First Order
- Affiliation: First Order; Sith Eternal
- Origin: Exegol
- Creator: Darth Sidious
- Apprentice: Kylo Ren

Supreme Leader Snoke is a fictional character in the Star Wars franchise. He is an artificial being created by the resurrected Sith Lord, Emperor Palpatine, who is aligned with the dark side of the Force. He was introduced in The Force Awakens (2015) as the Supreme Leader of the First Order and the master of Kylo Ren. He subsequently appeared in The Last Jedi (2017), in which he is killed by Kylo Ren. In the films, Snoke is a computer-generated character performed by Andy Serkis using motion capture. Serkis returned to the role and briefly voiced him in The Rise of Skywalker (2019).

== Character ==
=== Development ===
Snoke's appearance changed throughout principal photography and post-production of The Force Awakens. Andy Serkis said, "It's the first time I've been on set not yet knowing what the character's gonna look like. I mean, talk about secrecy!" According to the actor, the character's appearance, voice and movements evolved as he and the film's writer/director J. J. Abrams challenged the visual effects team.

According to The Force Awakens senior sculptor Ivan Manzella, "Snoke almost became a female at one point. J. J. picked out a maquette he liked and then we took it to a full-size version, sculpted in plasteline. J. J. and [creature creative supervisor Neal Scanlan] didn't want him to be old and decrepit, like [Emperor Palpatine]." Manzella later revealed that, influenced by a reference by Abrams to Hammer House of Horror, he partially based a maquette of Snoke on Peter Cushing, who portrayed Grand Moff Tarkin in the original Star Wars film.

=== Portrayal ===
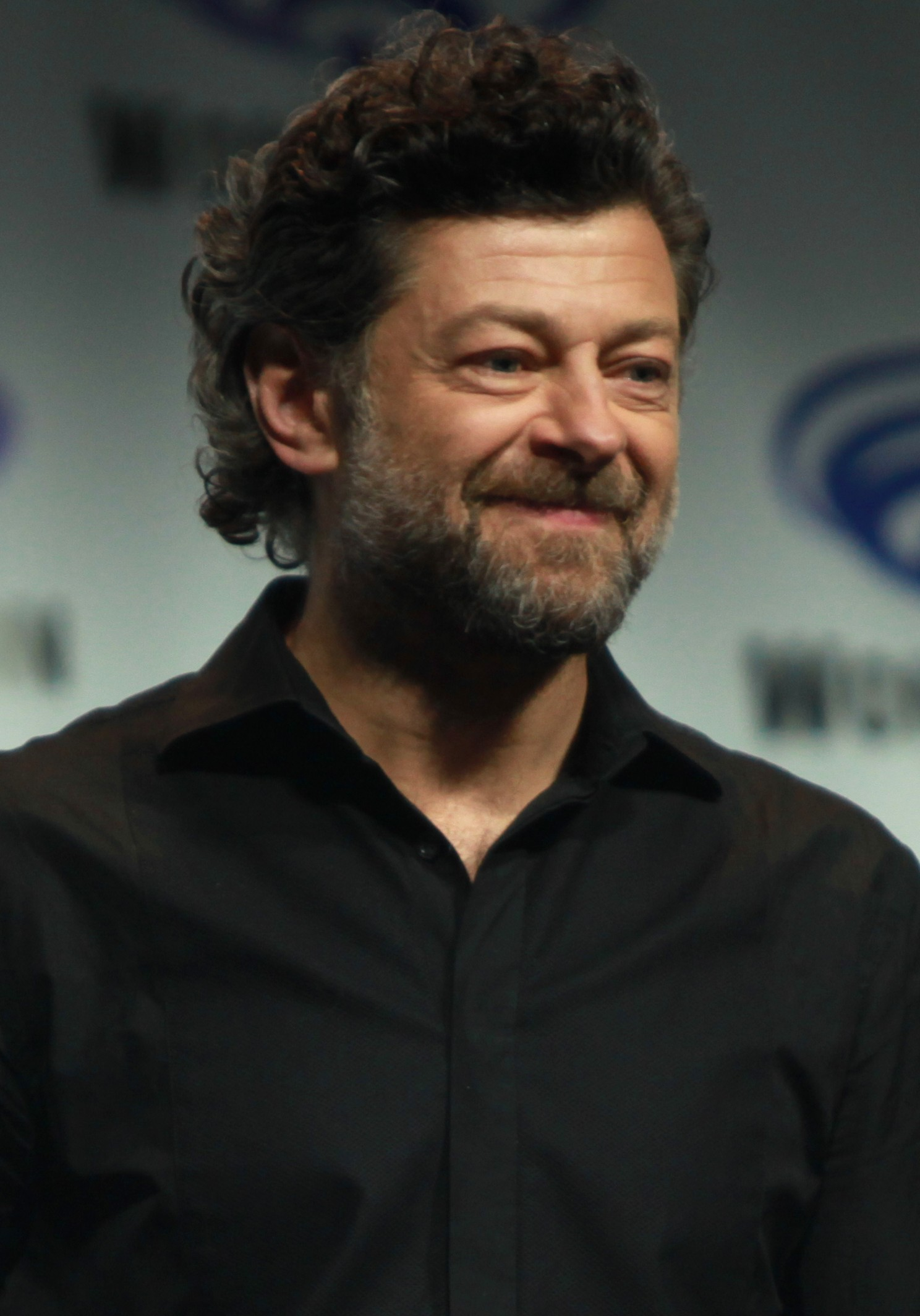
Andy Serkis portrays Snoke in the Star Wars sequel trilogy.

While Serkis secretly joined the project in February 2014, his casting in The Force Awakens was first announced on April 29, 2014. When asked about his role in July 2014, he joked, "I'm not Yoda." In May 2015, a StarWars.com interview with photographer Annie Leibovitz about her The Force Awakens shoot for Vanity Fair revealed that Serkis would be playing a CGI character named Supreme Leader Snoke, and featured an image of the actor in motion capture gear. Serkis had previously played several CGI characters using motion capture technology, including the titular gorilla in 2005's King Kong, and Caesar in the Planet of the Apes reboot series.

In November 2015, Serkis said of the process of creating Snoke:

When we first started working on it, [Abrams] had some rough notions of how Snoke was gonna look, but it really hadn't been fully-formed and it almost came out of discussion and performance ... We shot on set of course, and I was in the scenes I have with other actors, but the beauty of this process is you can go back and reiterate, keep informing and honing beats and moments. So J.J., after we shot last year, we've had a series of sessions where I'd be in London at The Imaginarium, my studio, while he's been directing from L.A., and we've literally been creating further additions and iterations to the character. That's been fascinating. And in the meantime I've been able to see the look and design of the character grow and change as the performances change. So it's been really exciting in that respect.

According to Serkis' costar Lupita Nyong'o, who played the CGI character Maz Kanata in The Force Awakens, the actor coached her on performance-capture work, telling Nyong'o that "a motion-capture character you develop the same way as any other. You have to understand who the character is and what makes them who they are." Serkis said of filming:

It was quite an unusual situation. I worked specifically with Domhnall Gleeson and with Adam Driver. My first day was basically standing on a 25-foot podium doing Lord Snoke without the faintest idea what he looked like ... or in fact who he was! I was very high up, totally on my own, away from everybody else, but acting with them ... we used sort of a "Kongolizer" method of having sound come out of speakers to give a sense of scale and distance for the character. So it was very challenging and scary, in fact probably one of my most scary film experiences I've ever had.

Costume designer Michael Kaplan had the idea to give Snoke gold robes to contrast from his red and black throne room in The Last Jedi. Director Rian Johnson said the red motif was intended to evoke curtains in a nod to The Wizard of Oz, in which the titular character hides behind a curtain. The throne room was designed to look theatrical as opposed to Palpatine's, which was more utilitarian. The conceptual designers of the set were inspired by unused concept art for Return of the Jedi depicting the Emperor's lava-based lair under the surface of Coruscant. According to The Last Jedi: The Visual Dictionary (2017), the gold ring Snoke wears is set with obsidian from Darth Vader's castle on Mustafar. The glyphs it is set with are a reference to four philosophers Palpatine had statues of in his office, first seen in Star Wars: Episode II – Attack of the Clones. Additionally, Palpatine's theme can be heard during the scene in which Snoke tortures Rey.

=== Description ===
In the context of the story, Snoke is a "genetic strandcast" (a type of clone) created by Emperor Palpatine to serve as his proxy in power. Snoke, whom Abrams called "a powerful figure on the dark side of the Force", was introduced as the leader of the First Order and master to the sequel trilogy's main villain, Kylo Ren. Serkis described Snoke as "quite an enigmatic character, and strangely vulnerable at the same time as being quite powerful. Obviously he has a huge agenda. He has suffered a lot of damage." Serkis called Snoke "a new character in this universe", adding "I think it'd be fair to say that he is aware of the past to a great degree."

Explaining why CGI was the only way to create Snoke's unique appearance, Serkis said before the film's premiere, "The scale of him, for instance, is one reason. He is large. He appears tall. And also just the facial design—you couldn't have gotten there with prosthetics ... he has a very distinctive, idiosyncratic bone and facial structure." Chief of creature and droid effects Neal Scanlan said, "This character is much better executed as a CGI character. That's just a practical reality when he's 7-foot-something tall; he's very, very thin." Snoke's "scarred, cavernous face" was not revealed before the release of the film, in which he appears as a "massive, ominous hologram". The character's deep voice was first heard in the teaser trailer released on November 28, 2014.

Robbie Collin of The Telegraph described the disfigured and skeletal Snoke as a "sepulchral horror", Richard Roeper of the Chicago Sun-Times called him "hissing and grotesque", and Andrew O'Hehir of Salon dubbed the character "a spectral demonic figure". Variety's Justin Chang wrote that Snoke resembled "a plus-sized, more articulate version of his character Gollum", and Chris Nashawaty of Entertainment Weekly described him as "essentially Emperor Palpatine crossed with one of the aliens from Close Encounters." Stephanie Zacharek of Time called the character "a giant, scary, noseless dude who sits placidly in an oversized chair like a dark-lord version of the Lincoln Monument."

There were multiple fan theories regarding the origins and identity of Snoke prior to the 2019 film The Rise of Skywalker. Such theories included that he was Darth Plagueis, a Sith Lord anecdotally mentioned in Star Wars: Episode III – Revenge of the Sith and the mentor of Palpatine, allegedly possessing the power to prevent death; Palpatine himself, "the Operator" Gallius Rax, a mysterious First Order manipulator from Chuck Wendig's Aftermath novel trilogy; or Ezra Bridger, a main character from the animated series Star Wars Rebels.

== Appearances ==
=== Film ===
==== The Force Awakens (2015) ====
In his first appearance in the film, Snoke is introduced as Supreme Leader of the First Order, and master to Kylo Ren (Adam Driver). Seduced to the dark side by Snoke, the masked Kylo is really Ben Solo, the son of Han Solo (Harrison Ford) and Leia Organa (Carrie Fisher). Snoke senses an "awakening" in the Force, and warns Ren that the limits of his power will be tested when he faces his father in pursuit of the wayward droid BB-8, which carries a map to the missing Luke Skywalker (Mark Hamill). Later, Snoke orders General Hux (Domnhall Gleeson) to destroy the New Republic with the Starkiller Base superweapon. He then orders Ren to bring Rey (Daisy Ridley) to him after she refuses to disclose the map to Luke. After Ren is defeated in a lightsaber duel with Rey, Snoke orders Hux to bring Ren to him to complete his training.

==== The Last Jedi (2017) ====
Following the events of The Force Awakens, Snoke leads the First Order forces as they pursue the outnumbered Resistance. He reprimands Hux for his failings as a military leader, and Kylo Ren for his failure to defeat Rey and find Luke Skywalker. Towards the end of the film, Ren brings Rey to Snoke, who tortures her for information on Luke's location. Snoke reveals that he created a psychic bond between Ren and Rey as part of a plan to destroy Luke. He then orders Ren to kill Rey. Ren, however, kills Snoke by using the Force to cut him in half with a lightsaber. Ren later declares himself the new Supreme Leader of the First Order, pinning Snoke's death on Rey.

==== The Rise of Skywalker (2019) ====
In The Rise of Skywalker, Kylo Ren finds several clones resembling Snoke at Emperor Palpatine’s (Ian McDiarmid) lair on the Sith world Exegol. Snoke's voice is briefly used by Palpatine when talking to Ren. It is revealed that the Sith Lord had used his creation Snoke as a puppet to lure Ren towards the dark side, and to reclaim the galaxy through the First Order.

=== Other works ===
Snoke appears in the 2015 novelization of The Force Awakens by Alan Dean Foster. In the novel, Leia tells Han in more detail how Snoke, aware that their son would be "strong with the Force" and possess "equal potential for good or evil", had long watched Ben and manipulated events to draw him to the dark side. An unplayable Lego minifigure version of Snoke appears in cutscenes in the 2016 video game Lego Star Wars: The Force Awakens, but became playable in Lego Star Wars: The Skywalker Saga as a character of the Dark Side class. In the spring of 2018, Snoke was added to the mobile MOBA Star Wars: Force Arena as a playable Dark Side squad leader.

Snoke is the focus of the 2019 one-shot comic book Age of Resistance: Villains – Supreme Leader Snoke, in which he says to Kylo, "If I had your uncle by my side instead of you, the galaxy would have been mine a long time ago."

According to The Rise of Skywalker: The Visual Dictionary (2019), Snoke's physical appearance was purposefully designed by Palpatine to ensure his species remained unidentifiable. Furthermore, Snoke's reluctance to meet in person with his First Order underlings helped conceal the fact that he was an artificial being. General Pryde (Richard E. Grant), a supporting villain in The Rise of Skywalker, was one of the few characters who knew Snoke was subservient to a higher power. The Star Wars Book (released in 2020 and co-authored by Lucasfilm creative Pablo Hidalgo) suggested Snoke may have been unaware of his origins. In The Rise of Kylo Ren comic book series, Kylo believes that Luke is responsible for Snoke's injuries.

== Reception ==
Todd McCarthy of The Hollywood Reporter wrote, "Supreme Leader Snoke is a larger-than-life, vaguely Harry Potter-ish hologram voiced with deep gravity by Andy Serkis; the full weight of this character's malignancy and dramatic power will presumably be better assessed in subsequent episodes." Richard Roeper of the Chicago Sun-Times called Serkis "the undisputed champion of the performance-capture roles". Though praising the "unobtrusive sophistication" of the visual effects used to portray the character, Variety's Justin Chang said that Serkis is "fine but not galvanizing" in the role. Lindsay Bahr of the Associated Press deemed Snoke one of the "less memorable" characters in The Force Awakens. In 2016, Serkis was nominated for an MTV Movie Award for Best Virtual Performance for the role.

Some viewers felt that Snoke's character arc was underdeveloped. Various fan theories about his origins were held so strongly among some viewers that it was difficult for them to accept his demise in The Last Jedi. Rian Johnson's decision to kill the character without developing him further was criticized by many. Serkis addressed the criticisms by saying producers wanted the character "to have a great deal of mystery", but that he "has been asked to not shed anything should they want to bring him back in any way, whether prequel or whatever". Forbes criticized The Force Awakens for not developing Snoke as a character, or exploring his backstory and inexplicable rise to power after the events of the original trilogy, calling the character "a bandage poorly placed over a gaping plot-hole". Serkis acknowledged that some fans found the lack of backstory "incredibly frustrating", but suggested this as an opportunity to layer Snoke in a future story. Despite the criticisms towards the writing, Forbes praised Serkis' performance in both films, and was much more positive towards his appearance in The Last Jedi, highlighting his death and his relationship with his apprentice, Kylo Ren.

== See also ==
- Palpatine family
