= Sith =

Organization in the Star Wars franchise

The Sith Order
- Star Wars organization
- Emblem of the Sith Order

In-universe information
- Type: Academic; Kraterocratic; Imperialistic
- Founded: c. 5,000 BBY or prior (canon) c. 6,900 BBY (Legends)
- Fate: Last member slain by Rey during the Battle of Exegol – 35 ABY (canon); Last known member slain by Ania Solo during the Battle of the Floating World – 139 ABY (Legends)
- Location: Sith Temple, Moraband (homeworld); Imperial Palace, Coruscant (headquarters – 19 BBY to 4 ABY); Fortress Vader, Mustafar (headquarters – 19 BBY to 4 ABY); Sith Citadel, Exegol (headquarters – 4 ABY to 35 ABY); Legends: Korriban (homeworld); Dromund Kaas (capital); Ziost (key planet)
- Leader: Unknown Rogue Jedi; Darth Bane (until c. 1022 BBY); Darth Plagueis (until 32 BBY); Darth Sidious (32 BBY – 35 ABY)
- Key people: Darth Vader; Darth Sidious; Darth Tyranus; Darth Maul; Darth Plagueis; The Stranger; Darth Bane; Legends: Emperor Vitiate; Darth Bane; Darth Tenebrous; Darth Talon; Ajunta Pall; Marka Ragnos; Naga Sadow; Darth Revan; Darth Malak; Darth Traya; Darth Nihilus; Darth Swan; Ludo Kressh; Darth Malgus; Lord Kaan; Darth Caedus; Darth Krayt; Lady Lumiya
- Affiliations: Galactic Republic (secretly; 32 BBY–19 BBY); Confederacy of Independent Systems (secretly); Trade Federation (secretly); Galactic Empire; First Order (secretly); Sith Eternal
- Enemies: Jedi Order; Galactic Republic
- Affiliates: Asajj Ventress; Savage Opress; Quinlan Vos (briefly); Inquisitorius (Grand Inquisitor); Supreme Leader Snoke; Knights of Ren (Ren; Kylo Ren)
- Official language: Basic, Old Tongue

Sith is the title used in the fictional universe of the Star Wars franchise for the main antagonists of both the movies and much of the Expanded Universe of the books. The Sith Order is a group of Force-sensitive beings that serve as the ideological antithesis and ancient enemies of the Jedi. They are depicted as an ancient cult of warriors who wield the dark side of the Force to seize power by any means necessary, including terrorism and mass murder with the ultimate goal of destroying the Jedi order and ruling the galaxy.

Several antagonistic factions in the franchise, including the Confederacy of Independent Systems, the Galactic Empire, the Imperial Remnant, and the First Order, are shown to have originated from the Sith.

Sith Lords, as masters of the order are known, are by nature ruthless. Members of the order have the power to assume absolute authority amongst their kind and be granted the honorific Dark Lord of the Sith. Sith culture is based on perpetual treachery and betrayal. The fate of Sith Lords is to be killed and replaced by their own apprentices. The Sith teach their apprentices to revere the dark side of the Force, to give full rein to aggressive emotions of rage and hatred, and to believe that others are expendable in the pursuit of power, thus making the Lords' demise inevitable.

Like the Jedi, the Sith wield the lightsaber as their traditional weapon, a device that generates a blade-like plasma powered by a kyber crystal. In contrast to the Jedi, who use blue, green, purple, white, and yellow lightsabers, the color for a Sith Lord lightsaber is usually red. There are two conceptions of how the red color is achieved. Within the pre-Disney Expanded Universe the idea was that they use an artificial kyber crystal that produces the red color. In Disney universe it is created by an unnatural corruption of the kyber crystal through the dark side's malignancy, causing the crystal to "bleed." This can have the side effect of giving the sound of ignition a harsher hiss.

One thousand years before the Galactic Civil War, the Sith came close to extinction after the Battle of Ruusan. Despite this, they continued to covertly exist as two Dark Lords at a time, a master and an apprentice, until their later resurgence in the history of the galaxy.

== Conception ==
=== Influences ===
George Lucas has acknowledged that many sources have inspired the concepts of the Jedi, Sith, and the Force. These include knighthood, chivalry, paladinism, samurai bushido, Shaolin Monastery, feudalism, Hinduism, qigong, Greek philosophy and mythology, Roman history and mythology, Sufism, Confucianism, Shintō, Buddhism and Taoism, and numerous cinematic precursors. The works of philosopher Friedrich Nietzsche and mythologist Joseph Campbell, especially his book The Hero with a Thousand Faces (1949), directly influenced Lucas and was what drove him to create the 'modern myth' of Star Wars. In particular, the Manichaean relationship between the dark side-using Sith and light side-using Jedi mirrors several modern and classical literary tropes.

The ongoing struggle of the humanistic "light side"-affiliated Jedi to permanently defeat the egoistic "dark side"-affiliated Sith is framed not only as a contest of values but as a deep metaphysical conflict: the dark side of the Force is viewed by the Jedi, and generally represented within Star Wars media, as not only a dangerous expedient but as a form of existential corruption that must be purged for the universe, or a person, to attain spiritual balance. Jedi are often depicted as imperfect individuals, but their cause of selfless heroism is ultimately on the right side of an inexorable cosmic struggle against evil, embodied in the power-hungry Sith and the dark side of the Force.

The dualistic relationship between these Sith and Jedi concepts of "purity" mirrors the philosophical and literary concept of "Apollonian and Dionysian": the Jedi are portrayed as embracing purity, reason, temperance, altruism, and other humanistic virtues. The Sith, by contrast, embrace curiosity, emotion, conflict, power, instincts, unfettered self-interest and other hedonistic vices. However, whereas the classic Greek concept did not necessarily view the Apollonian and Dionysian principles as opposed, Star Wars frames the Jedi and Sith as opponents in a dire moral struggle, with the Sith cast as corrupted villains apparently destined for defeat or self-destruction in the end. The Greek analogy also makes clear that the conflict between the Jedi and the Sith reflects the universe's eternal dichotomy between order (Apollonian) and chaos (Dionysian). Ironically, the Sith, and the Imperials generally, enforcing order on society through brutal authoritarianism. However, the individual Sith soul is chaotic: a Sith is never at peace, wracked by jealousy and paranoia until he or she has achieved ultimate supremacy.

Within the Star Wars narrative, the Jedi and Sith naturally have differing understandings of the Force. In Sith rhetoric, the relationship between the philosophy of Jedi versus Sith closely mirrors German philosopher Friedrich Nietzsche's concept of master–slave morality; Sith value "master" virtues, such as pride and power, whereas the Jedi value altruistic "slave" virtues like kindness and compassion.

The goal of the Sith is tangible greatness: the ability to shape or destroy a world according to one's will alone. The goal of the Jedi is moral goodness: freedom from inner turmoil and selfish desires. However, the Sith consider the Jedi's aspirations to be either hopeless or pathetic. To the Sith, achieving greater power, following one's passion, and freedom from inhibition are more authentic ways of expressing the Force. While the Jedi strive for a harmonious connection to the Force, the Sith seek a deeper understanding through conflict, as they believe the Force is defined by it.

== Development ==
Originally, George Lucas conceived the Sith as an army of fanatical soldiers that served the Emperor in the same way that the Schutzstaffel had served Adolf Hitler. In developing the history for The Empire Strikes Back, Lucas condensed this into one character in the form of Darth Vader.

=== Ideology ===
Sith philosophy values conflict as a catalyst for growth and as a means to purging the weak, disloyal, and undisciplined. Sith emphasize the maxims "because we feel like it" and "survival of the fittest" and view restraint as a weakness. Members of the order can be regarded as adhering to the Nietzschean master morality and are characterized by the desire to seize power by any means necessary, leveraging force (both physical and supernatural), social maneuvering, and political cunning to their advantage.

Throughout Star Wars media and in popular culture, the Sith are infamous as the dualistic antagonists to the Jedi, an affiliation of altruistic warriors who strive to use their own martial training and connection to the "light side" of the Force to promote peace and the common welfare throughout the galaxy. To counteract the Jedi's benevolent influence, the Sith instigate both large- and small-scale conflicts as part of their larger plan to destabilize the Republic and eventually take control of the galaxy.

=== The Code of the Sith ===
The Sith are dedicated to the "Code of the Sith" and to mastering the dark side of the Force. The Code of the Sith identifies conflict as the fundamental dynamic of reality, and holds that the search for lasting peace, within or without, is both quixotic and misguided. Rather, Sith embrace strife and dark passion as salutary and emancipatory forces, as they believe that violent struggle purges the decadent and weak, and that emotions such as aggression and hate provide the strength and resolve to secure freedom through victory.

The Code:

Peace is a lie. There is only passion.
Through passion I gain strength.
Through strength I gain power.
Through power I gain victory.
Through victory my chains are broken.
The Force shall free me.

— The Code of the Sith

Although Sith seek dominion, Sith philosophy stresses that power belongs only to those with the strength, cunning, and ruthlessness to maintain it, and thus "betrayal" among the Sith is not a vice but an endorsed norm. Accordingly, the Sith reject altruism, self-denial, and kindness, as they regard such attitudes as founded on delusions that fetter one's perceptions and power. In connection with their philosophy, the Sith draw on the dark side of the Force through severe negative emotions, a technique opposed to that of their archenemies, the Jedi, who rely on the Force's "light side," i.e., the Force as experienced through disciplined states of apathy. Notably, both the Jedi and Sith shun romantic and familial love, as well as other positive emotions; the Jedi fear that such love will lead to attachment, and thus selfishness, while the Sith fear it will compromise their ruthlessness and connection to the dark side of the Force.

Although the Sith are intimately linked to the dark side, not every user of the dark side is a Sith, nor is every user of the light side a Jedi.

Yes, a Jedi's strength flows from the Force. But beware of the dark side. Anger, fear, aggression; the dark side of the Force are they. Easily they flow, quick to join you in a fight. If once you start down the dark path, forever will it dominate your destiny, consume you it will, as it did Obi-Wan's apprentice.

— Yoda, in The Empire Strikes Back

The dark side of the Force is stigmatized as seductive, corruptive, and addictive by the Jedi, who view it as evil, whereas the Sith consider the dark side of the Force to be its most powerful manifestation, and regard the abstemious Jedi as blinded by false virtue. As portrayed in all Star Wars-related media, the dark side provides users with powers similar to those of the light side-using Jedi, but as it leverages passion and violence, its use is enhanced by negative raw and aggressive emotions and instinctual feelings such as anger, greed, hatred, and rage. By deciding to learn the ways of the dark side of the Force, the Sith may also acquire powers and abilities considered by some in the Star Wars universe to be unnatural. A notable example is "Force lightning", electricity projected from the fingertips as a means of attack and torture, most famously used by Darth Sidious to torture Luke Skywalker in Star Wars Episode VI: Return of the Jedi. In Star Wars Episode III: Revenge of the Sith, meanwhile, Palpatine claims that the dark side gave the Sith Lord Darth Plagueis power over death itself. Being uninhibited in their use of the Force, Sith could also repurpose abilities shared with the Jedi, such as telekinesis, to new and terrifying effect: Darth Vader was infamous for his use of telekinetic strangulation, or "Force choke," as a means of execution or intimidation. He even went so far as to murder individuals with his power, including at least two Imperial officers and his wife, Padmé Amidala (though it is unclear if Padmé's death was caused directly by the choke).

"Fear is the path to the dark side. Fear leads to anger, anger leads to hate, hate leads to suffering."

— Yoda, in The Phantom Menace

Extended use of the dark side strongly influences the user's nature, resulting in a loss of humanity, morality, and the ability to love, leaving every Sith, to varying degrees, amoral, cruel, and violent. Considering this dark change in personality to be a transformation into a different person altogether, some who turn to the dark side take on a different name, as they regard their former persona as dead and destroyed. Sith Lords, in particular, adopt a new name upon their initiation into the Order, prefixing it with the title Darth (e.g., "Darth Vader"). Severe saturation in the dark side may even lead to physical degradation. It is common for Sith who have immersed themselves in the dark side to have yellow eyes and pale skin, as evidenced by Darth Sidious in Return of the Jedi and the newly corrupted Vader in Revenge of the Sith. Although Sith are deeply affected by the methods and dark arts they practice, they are not portrayed as necessarily irredeemable: some Sith, most famously Darth Vader in the final moments of his life, have renounced the Order and the dark side of the Force.

Martial arts are a core part of the Sith tradition, and Sith featured in the Star Wars film series have all been highly trained warriors who further augment their abilities with the Force. Like the Jedi, the Sith's signature armament is a lethal focused energy melee weapon known as a lightsaber, which (generally) only those trained in the ways of the Force can use effectively, although General Grievous, a non-Force user, is able to murder numerous Jedi and seize their lightsabers as trophies. Sith use lightsabers in combination with Force-derived powers, such as telekinesis, enhanced dexterity and precognition, to achieve superhuman combat prowess. A well-trained Sith is depicted as being at least a match for a well-trained Jedi Knight, and either can handily defeat multiple ordinary attackers. In matters of dress, Sith may adopt any attire consistent with their plans or guise; they commonly favor black robes and armor.

=== Fictional backstory (Legends) ===
The Sith's history prior to the events detailed in the films is portrayed in the comic book series Tales of the Jedi, published by Dark Horse Comics from 1993 to 1998; the Knights of the Old Republic video game sub-series; and the Darth Bane novel trilogy written by Drew Karpyshyn. These pieces of media are considered part of the non-canonical Legends continuity.

The Sith Order began around 6,900 BBY, during a period known as the Hundred-Year Darkness. A series of conflicts began between the rebellious Dark Jedi, a faction of the Jedi Order, and the rest of the Order. The Dark Jedi were defeated and cast out, exiled to the unknown regions. These Dark Jedi, later known as the Exiles, settled on the planet Korriban and encountered its native species, the Sith. This species consisted of ape-like humanoids with dark salmon-colored skin, chin tentacles, and long bones jutting from their faces. Their culture was reminiscent of both the ancient Egyptians (a monumental necropolis for deceased Dark Lords) and the Indo-Aryans of India (a rigid caste system). Korriban and its Sith inhabitants had once been a thrall world of the Infinite Empire, a galaxy-spanning dictatorship ruled by a long-lost amphibian species called the Rakata approximately 25,000 years prior. The Rakata, who thrived on the use of the dark side of the Force, passed on their affinity for the dark side and capacity for war and conquest to the Sith. Upon making first contact with the Exiles, the Sith allowed them dominion over Korriban. The strongest among the Exiles, Ajunta Pall, became the first to hold the title Dark Lord of the Sith. His contemporaries, such as Karness Muur and XoXaan, became Sith Lords. The human Dark Jedi interbred with the Sith species, and their rule would become the original Sith Empire.

One of the earliest leaders of this Sith Empire was Tulak Hord. He expanded the Sith territories and conquered the Dromund System, home to Dromund Kaas, later the capital of the Sith Empire. Another notorious Sith Lord who existed during this time was Darth Andeddu, a warlord who conquered the world of Prakith after being ousted from the Sith Empire. Andeddu was famous for being the supposed forbear of the "Darth" title, believed to be a corruption of the Rakatan word for "emperor" that future Dark Lords would habitually adopt upon ascending to Sith mastery. Tulak Hord was eventually followed by Marka Ragnos, the last ruler of a period known as the Golden Age of the Sith. Upon the passing of Ragnos, two contenders for the throne of Dark Lord, Naga Sadow and Ludo Kressh, duelled at his funeral. Eventually, after a series of conflicts, Sadow was victorious, and Kressh apparently killed.

Sadow began the Great Hyperspace War, the first campaign of oppression waged against the galaxy by the Sith, by invading the Republic and laying siege to its planets. Sadow's efforts were initially met with success, his forces amplified by illusions that Sadow projected from his meditation sphere. Ultimately, however, his concentration broke when his apprentice turned on him. With his illusions dispersed, Sadow's forces were forced to retreat. Upon returning to Sith space, they found that Kressh had not been killed, and they engaged him in a space battle. Sadow was victorious once again, but they were soon attacked by Republic forces. Sadow escaped by causing the Denarii Binary Star to go supernova. The Sith Empire was saved from collapse by Darth Vitiate, another one of Ragnos's former acolytes, who led the Sith into hiding in the Unknown Regions.

In the Empire's absence, the influence of the Sith eventually led to the corruption of several Jedi Knights, including Freedon Nadd, Exar Kun, and Ulic Qel-Droma. This had begun the Old Sith Wars. Nadd, a former prodigy from the Jedi stronghold world of Ossus, made the conscious choice to embrace the dark side of the Force and sought out knowledge from Sadow's fallen empire, eventually leading him to Sadow himself, still alive and in exile on Yavin IV. After learning from Sadow, Nadd murdered his teacher and used his Sith status and power to conquer the planet Onderon and produce a royal lineage. After Nadd's death, Exar Kun sought out Sith arts from both Nadd's spirit and that of Marka Ragnos. The latter declared Kun Dark Lord of the Sith and made Qel-Droma his apprentice. Corrupting several Jedi to their cause and allying themselves with warriors such as the Mandalorians, Kun and Qel-Droma declared war on the Galactic Republic. During a raid on the Jedi Library at Ossus, Qel-Droma dueled and killed his brother but was captured. Qel-Droma was subsequently redeemed and was instrumental in Kun's downfall when the latter retreated to Naga Sadow's former stronghold on Yavin IV.

At the start of the Old Sith Wars, Exar Kun's invasion directly influenced the Mandalorian Wars, whereas the individuals known as Revan and Alek came across Darth Vitiate's empire in the Unknown Regions. Seduced to the dark side and declaring themselves Sith Lords, Revan and Alek became Darth Revan and Darth Malak, respectively. Vitiate had them seek out the Star Forge, an ancient, Rakatan weapons plant that the Sith hoped to use to speed up their return to the galaxy. Revan and Malak instead opted to use the Star Forge to fuel their own imperial war machine and led a brutal and hugely successful campaign against the Republic. Revan initially hoped to supplant the Republic with his own Sith regime as a means of contesting Vitiate's empire, but was betrayed by Malak, allowing a Jedi strike team to capture him. Malak continued his conquest without Revan's tactical leadership until a redeemed Revan defeated him, and the Star Forge, the source of their Sith fleet, was destroyed.

Remnants of Revan's Sith Empire were reorganized into a loose alliance of soldiers, assassins, and fallen Jedi led by the Sith Triumvirate, a triad of Sith Lords consisting of Darth Traya, Revan's former teacher; Darth Nihilus, a fallen Jedi and survivor of the Mandalorian Wars; and Darth Sion, a veteran Sith warrior from Exar Kun's war. The three of them began a shadow war against the Jedi, with Nihilus using his power to absorb Force energies to wipe out an entire planet of Jedi refugees, while Sion led a contingent of assassins to hunt down the survivors. This First Jedi Purge brought the Jedi Order to the brink of extinction. The Triumvirate's downfall came about when Meetra Surik, a Jedi who was exiled after the Mandalorian Wars, returned to known space. She defeated the three Sith, and without leadership and the destruction of their base of operations on Malachor V, the remaining Sith forces faded into obscurity. This ends the fifty-year-long Old Sith Wars. Surik's students were able to help the Jedi recover from the Triumvirate's purge.

Around 300 years later, the original Sith Empire, still under the leadership of a seemingly immortal Vitiate, emerged from the Unknown Regions and declared war on the Republic. This war, dubbed the Great Galactic War, was halted when Vitiate, on the cusp of victory, was restrained by the telepathic prowess of Revan. After a period of non-fighting, called the Galactic Cold War, tensions boiled over, and the Galactic War began. The war briefly fell in favor of the Republic and the Jedi, with the Sith gradually losing ground, until both factions were forced to join in an alliance against a third faction of Force-users known as the Eternal Empire of Zakuul. Once the Eternal Empire was defeated, the war against the Sith resumed. Vitiate perished during the conflict, with Darth Acina eventually taking control. Acina herself was in turn dethroned by Darth Malgus, who proved to be a fairly successful leader but over time the Sith Empire eventually fell to infighting and mostly disappeared. Occasionally, a Dark Lord such as Darth Rivan or Darth Ruin would rise and fall, but the Sith did not become a major threat again until around 2,500 years later.

This conflict was known as the New Sith Wars, which lasted for a thousand years, and had doomed the galaxy into a crippling Dark Age.

At this point the Brotherhood of Darkness arose, led by the Sith Lord Skere Kaan. They focused on controlling the infighting between the Sith. This policy allowed them to make great progress in their war against the Republic. Ironically, one of their own, the Sith Lord Darth Bane, turned on them, engineering a civil war that ended with the deaths of every one of the Brotherhood's members, except for Bane himself. Bane then started the Rule of Two, which evolved into the Sith organisation as they are seen in the films: an order consisting only of two Sith Lords, a master and an apprentice. The Rule of Two was continued after Bane's death by his apprentice Darth Zannah and her own pupil, Darth Cognus.

Bane, Zannah and Cognus' legacy would continue for 1,000 years, with the ultimate goal being the eradication of the Jedi and the conversion of the Republic into a Sith-run empire. Over thirty Dark Lords were produced by the Rule of Two during the following millennia until, around 67 BBY, the title of master had been claimed by Darth Plagueis. A member of the intellectual Muun species, Plagueis took Palpatine, senator of the planet Naboo, as his apprentice. Christened as Darth Sidious, Palpatine set the final stages of the Sith's revenge against the Jedi, as depicted in the films.

=== History ===
The Star Wars saga began with the film Star Wars Episode IV: A New Hope, which was released in 1977. Since then, additional films, as well as books, computer games, and comics set in the Star Wars fictional universe have been appended to the original trilogy. and have collectively expanded on the history of the Sith.

The schemes of the Sith are key to the overarching plot of the Star Wars films and much other fictional material in the franchise. Their background has varied among depictions, but the Sith have always been insidious archenemies of the Jedi leveraging dark arts in pursuit of power and revenge. This was after they came out of hiding for a thousand years, who in turn were defeated after a two thousand year-long galactic conventual war, known as the Jedi-Sith War. The Sith were first mentioned in A New Hope in a scene ultimately cut from the film. They were expanded upon heavily in the following years in books, comics, games and other multimedia. The Sith were formally introduced on-screen with the release of Star Wars: Episode I – The Phantom Menace in 1999 as a shadowy martial order manipulating the movie's political factions into a galaxy-spanning civil war.

Star Wars: The Clone Wars first aired on Cartoon Network in 2008. This series took place between Episode II: Attack of the Clones and Episode III: Revenge of the Sith. During this time, Anakin Skywalker is a full-fledged Jedi Knight, and the series shows how he progresses into his fall to the dark side of the Force. Count Dooku is the active Sith Lord and leader of the Separatist Alliance. The series also explores Dooku's attempts at training secret apprentices like Asajj Ventress and Savage Opress in order to eventually defeat Darth Sidious and become the ruling Sith Lord.

==== Emergence of the Sith Order ====
The origin, agenda, abilities, and philosophy of the Sith are collectively intertwined due to their relationship to the Force. With proper training, the Force may be called upon by rare individuals capable of "sensing" or "touching" it to achieve extraordinary feats such as telekinesis, precognition, and mental suggestion. Not all psychological states are conducive to employing the Force; discipline is required. However, both quietude and focused, intense passion alike can be effective. The Sith originated from a species of Force-sensitive warriors who discovered the efficacy of passion as a tool to draw on the Force at least 5,000 years prior to the events of the first Star Wars film. Fully embracing this approach, they became defined and corrupted by it.

The warriors who would become the first Sith were apparently heterodox members of the Jedi. The Jedi served as a space-faring knightly order within the Galactic Republic, a representative democracy encompassing most developed worlds. The Jedi Order sought to use the powers of the Force to help defend the weak and advance the rule of law across the galaxy, in keeping with their ethics of self-sacrifice and service to the common welfare. The Jedi creed mirrored their method of utilizing the Force, and Jedi doctrine favored states of serenity, detachment, compassion, and humility as the proper means of accessing its power. Controversy emerged when members of the Jedi Order began to experiment with passion as an alternative. The Jedi establishment saw these innovations as a threat to the ethos of the Jedi, opening members to the seduction of power and cruelty. Eventually, this controversy led to a conflict in which the rebelling Jedi were defeated and exiled.

In exile, the dissident Jedi were free to explore the relationship between passion and the Force. They concluded that the martial and ethical disciplines of the Jedi establishment were foolish and misguided. Passion, not quietude, was the most potent means of accessing the Force, and conflict, not peace, was the natural and healthy state of the universe. Rejecting the teachings of the light side of the Force, the exiles now embraced ruthless personal ambition, believing that power belonged to those with the cunning and strength to seize it. In their training, the dissidents would seek to master the Force by cultivating dark passions such as anger and hate, a practice condemned by the Jedi. Guided by their egoistic philosophy based on ruling by seizing power and armed with taboo Dark Side techniques, the former Jedi exiles reemerged to menace the galaxy as the Sith Order, aiming to conquer the Galactic Republic and exact revenge against the Jedi.

==== Great Hyperspace Wars ====
A succession of Sith-led regimes would arise to challenge the Jedi and the Galactic Republic, an era known as the "Great Hyperspace Wars". The Jedi-led Republic Armed Forces managed to repel the Sith invasion from Coruscant and then pursued them all the way back to Korriban and essentially killed and purged all of the Sith they could find; Republic historians would call this campaign the post-Great Hyperspace War counter-invasion but the Sith simply called it a genocide. However, internal power struggles would prove decisive in thwarting the Sith's designs. The paradox of reconciling endless personal ambition with the interests of the Sith as a whole became a great practical and philosophical concern for the Sith.

Ultimately, this paradox was "resolved" through a drastic reorganization by Darth Bane, who recast the Sith into a master-apprentice tradition called the Rule of Two. Starting with Darth Bane, there would be only two Sith at a time: one to embody power and the other to crave it. While concealing their identity as Sith, a succession of Sith masters and apprentices would work through the centuries to place themselves into positions of power and undermine the responsible authorities, preparing to overtake the Galactic Republic. The Banite tradition encouraged each apprentice to eventually challenge and murder their master and take an apprentice in turn. In this way, Darth Bane guaranteed the conspiracy remained a secret for a thousand years. He believed the Sith could exert their power and obtain their revenge against the Jedi by galactic domination. The first six Star Wars films chronicle this ancient scheme.

==== Ascent to power of the Sith ====
Darth Bane's plan would come to fruition through Senator Palpatine of Naboo, later Supreme Chancellor of the Galactic Republic, and secretly a Dark Lord of the Sith ("Darth Sidious"). By manipulating disgruntled factions within the Galactic Republic, Palpatine orchestrated a civil war. This conflict, known within the Star Wars universe as the "Clone Wars", provided a justification for consolidating power in the Galactic Republic's chief executive and assembling a large army of cloned soldiers conditioned to obey certain key commands issued by Palpatine. The Jedi eventually discovered Palpatine's identity as a Sith Lord and attempted to arrest him. Palpatine framed their actions as an attempted coup, using it as a pretext for annihilating the Jedi by activating "Order 66," one of the embedded protocols in the clone soldiers. In the course of effecting his designs, Palpatine also manipulated the most powerful Jedi Knight, Anakin Skywalker, into his service by promising to teach him how to save the life of Padmé Amidala. In a tragic irony, Padmé's sheer horror at discovering Anakin's collaboration with Sidious resulted in her death during childbirth. Sidious would trick Anakin into believing that he had killed Padmé in anger. Anakin's subsequent emotional collapse would lead him to fully embrace the dark side of the Force. Sidious would rule the newly created Galactic Empire for approximately 20 years as its Emperor with Darth Vader at his side. Initially unknown to Vader and Sidious, two children were delivered by Padme before her death.

==== Sith temples ====
The Rebels episode "Twilight of the Apprentice" features a forbidden planet called Malachor, home of an ancient Sith temple. The temple contains a super-weapon and can only be activated by placing a special Sith Holocron in an obelisk at the summit of the pyramid inside the temple. Thousands of years prior, a battle was waged on Malachor that resulted in the deaths of its inhabitants. Somewhere between the events of his last appearance in Solo: A Star Wars Story and this Rebels episode, Darth Maul had become stranded on the planet. When Ahsoka Tano, Kanan Jarrus and Ezra Bridger arrive, Ezra is separated from them. He is discovered by Maul, and together, they use the Force cooperatively to solve a series of tests and retrieve a Sith Holocron. With the help of Kanan and Ahsoka, they fight three Inquisitors, all of whom are killed by Maul. Maul then betrays his allies, blinding Kanan, and proceeds to activate the super-weapon.

Maul is defeated by a sightless Kanan, and Darth Vader arrives with the intention of retrieving the holocron, but is challenged by Ahsoka, his former Padawan. While the super-weapon is preparing to fire, Kanan and Ezra retrieve the holocron and escape, preventing the weapon of mass destruction from being used. Even though the temple is destabilized, Ahsoka and Vader keep fighting to the death within the rapidly crumbling building, until it eventually explodes, wounding Vader.

The Star Wars Resistance episode "The Relic Raiders" depicts a Sith temple hidden underneath a later Jedi temple.

==== End of the Sith ====
Anakin's children, Leia and Luke Skywalker, would become crucial members of the Rebel Alliance to restore the Galactic Republic. Luke would be secretly tutored in the ways of the Force by Vader's own former Jedi Master, Obi-Wan Kenobi, and a powerful elder Jedi, Yoda, who also survived Darth Sidious's purge. Ironically, during a final confrontation between Luke Skywalker, Darth Vader, and the Emperor aboard a mobile battle station known as the Death Star, the Sith lineage would end as Darth Bane prescribed that it proceed.

Sidious offered Skywalker an ultimatum to enter his service or die, and proceeded to use his Force-derived powers to torture and threaten to kill Skywalker when the latter refused to embrace the dark side of the Force. Experiencing a crisis of conscience at the imminent death of Skywalker, whom Vader now knew to be his son, Vader chose to intervene and kill his former master, Sidious, fulfilling the prophecy of the Chosen One. Vader would die of his injuries shortly thereafter, thus apparently bringing an end to the Sith and their ancient vendetta.

The 2019 film The Rise of Skywalker depicts the climax of the conflict between the Sith and the Jedi, and features the group known as the Sith Eternal, led by a resurrected Darth Sidious. Sidious's second and final demise at the hands of his granddaughter Rey marks the irrevocable end of the Sith.

The Battle of Exegol, had not only resulted in the end of the Empire's 54 year-long existence, but it had also resulted in the end of Palpatine's 67-year galactic influence. It had also ended the Sith's 1067-yearlong Grand Plan. Therefore, ending the centuries long legacy, of both Darth Bane and Emperor Palpatine's Sith.

== Overview ==
=== Timeline ===
- Before the events of the films – At an unknown point in time, numerous Jedi become disillusioned with the Order and exile themselves, forming the Sith Order. Thousands of years later, a centuries-long war between the Jedi and the Sith takes place, which culminates with the apparent death of all the Sith. The sole survivor, Darth Bane, takes an apprentice and goes on to create the Rule of Two, beginning the era of the modern Sith, who live in secrecy. Almost 1,000 years after Bane's death, Darth Plagueis trains Darth Sidious, who ultimately kills his master and takes Darth Maul as his first apprentice.
- Star Wars: Episode I – The Phantom Menace – Sidious and Maul are the only known Sith in the galaxy. The latter kills Jedi Master Qui-Gon Jinn but is defeated by his padawan Obi-Wan Kenobi and is presumed dead.
- Star Wars: Episode II – Attack of the Clones – Sidious has replaced Maul with Darth Tyranus (Count Dooku) who had formerly been a Jedi Master and was once the mentor of Obi-Wan's late master Qui-Gon Jinn.
- Star Wars: The Clone Wars film and television series – Sidious and Tyranus are the main pair of Sith in the galaxy. Tyranus takes Asajj Ventress as an informal apprentice, and later replaces her with Savage Opress. After betraying Tyranus, Opress finds his lost brother, Maul, who resurfaces as a Sith Master to rival Sidious and takes Opress as an apprentice. Sidious later kills Opress, and Tyranus kills Ventress who ends up dying and being buried on Darthomir but returning later in Star Wars: The Bad Batch due to night sister magic.
- Star Wars: Episode III – Revenge of the Sith – Tyranus is killed by Jedi Knight Anakin Skywalker, who later turns to the dark side and becomes Sidious's third apprentice, Darth Vader. The Sith effectively take over the galaxy by nearly exterminating the entire Jedi Order and converting the Republic into the Galactic Empire, over which Sidious rules as Emperor.
- Star Wars Rebels – Sidious and Vader are the main pair of Sith in the galaxy. Vader trains the Inquisitors, all of whom are former Jedi, to hunt down surviving members of the Order hiding from the Empire. Maul lives in exile and no longer sees himself as a Sith; he later tries to take Ezra Bridger as an apprentice, but fails and is eventually killed in a duel against Obi-Wan.
- Star Wars: Episode IV – A New Hope, Star Wars: Episode V – The Empire Strikes Back, and Star Wars: Episode VI – Return of the Jedi – Sidious and Vader are the only Sith in the galaxy. Vader eventually kills Sidious to save his son, Luke Skywalker, redeeming himself and returning to the light side at the cost of his own life. The deaths of Sidious and Vader signify the end of the Sith and the beginning of the downfall of the Galactic Empire, which eventually collapses a year later.
- Star Wars: Episode VII – The Force Awakens – Snoke and his apprentice, Kylo Ren, Vader's grandson, fill in the power vacuum left by the absence of the Sith in the galaxy. Snoke serves as Supreme Leader of the First Order, which emerged from the remnants of the Galactic Empire, while Kylo leads the Knights of Ren, a group of Force-wielders who take their strength from the dark side. None of them are official Sith.
- Star Wars: Episode VIII – The Last Jedi – Snoke is killed by Kylo Ren, who replaces him as Supreme Leader.
- Star Wars: Episode IX – The Rise of Skywalker – Sidious is revealed to have been resurrected and to have manipulated Kylo Ren's actions. He leads the Sith Eternal on Exegol and attempts to reconquer the galaxy for the Sith but is ultimately and permanently killed by his granddaughter Rey, the last living Jedi, but she dies as a result. Kylo is redeemed like Vader before him by reclaiming his true identity as Ben Solo and kills the Knights of Ren before Sidious's second and permanent death happened. Ben later gave his own life to revive Rey. Without its leadership, the First Order eventually collapses, marking the permanent end of the Sith.

=== Members ===
Jedi and Sith Order master-apprentice relationships

Generations of Sith
Darth Andeddu; Immortal God-King of Prakith (Note: Established in the Darth Bane trilogy (2006–2009), written by Drew Karpyshyn.) (Note: Established in the 2019 film Star Wars: The Rise of Skywalker, written by Chris Terrio and J. J. Abrams.)
Darth Vitiate; Tenebrae Valkorion (Note: Established in the video game series Star Wars: Knights of the Old Republic (2003–2019).)	Darth Traya; Kreia
Exal Kressh	Revan	The Jedi Exile; Meetra Surik
Darth Malak
1,000 Generations
Darth Bane; Dessel
Darth Zannah; Rain
Darth Cognus; The Huntress	Set Harth
Darth Millennial	1,000 Years
Prophets of the Dark Side	Darth Tenebrous; Rugess Nome
1,000 Years	Darth Plagueis; Hego Damask	Darth Venamis
Ren (Note: Established in the comic book series Star Wars: The Rise of Kylo Ren (2019–2020), written by Charles Soule.)	Darth Sidious; Emperor Palpatine
Sith Eternal	Supreme Leader; Snoke	Mother Talzin (Note: Established in the television series Star Wars: The Clone Wars (2008–2020).)	Darth Tyranus; Count Dooku	Cylo Directive (Note: Established in the comic book series Darth Vader: Dark Lord of the Sith (2017–2018), written by Kieron Gillen and Charles Soule.)
Kylo Ren; Ben Solo	Maul	Asajj Ventress	General Grievous
Darth Momin	Knights of Ren	Quinlan Vos (Note: Established in the 2015 novel Dark Disciple, written by Christie Golden.)	General Krell
Darth Vader; Anakin Skywalker	Ezra Bridger	Savage Opress
Doctor Chelli Lona Aphra	Inquisitorius

Colour key:
Colour	Description
	Jedi
	Sith
	Knights of Ren
	Jedi turned Sith
	Former Sith
	Sith apprentices
	Other Force users
	Cannot use the Force

==== Darth Sidious ====
Darth Sidious (Emperor Palpatine) was a human Dark Lord of the Sith who appeared in each trilogy of the Skywalker Saga. Originally the eldest son of an aristocratic family from the planet Naboo, he rose to power within the Galactic Republic's government system starting from Senator of his homeworld, then to Supreme Chancellor of the Republic, and finally self-proclaimed Emperor of the Galactic Empire. This was done by cultivating a public image as a humble and competent politician while secretly studying and mastering dark Sith arts under Plagueis, and planning the destruction of the Jedi Order and Republic. Eventually, by manipulating disaffected political groups and using double agents to sow discord, Palpatine fomented a civil war that provided an opportunity for him to seize absolute power. He had three known Sith apprentices: Darth Maul, Darth Tyranus, and Darth Vader. He was eventually betrayed and killed by the latter, Vader, at the end of Return of the Jedi. He returned more than 30 years later in The Rise of Skywalker, having managed to cheat death through powerful mastery of the dark side of the Force. He attempted to reclaim control of the galaxy through the Sith Eternal's fleet of Xyston-class Star Destroyers, the Final Order, but was finally killed by his granddaughter, Rey, who deflected his Force lightning back at him using the two Skywalker lightsabers. Darth Sidious's second and permanent death marked the definitive end of the Sith.

In the continuity of Legends, Darth Sidious would return to using clones and ancient Sith powers, returning in several clone bodies over the course of several novels and comics. During this time he would briefly turn Luke Skywalker to the dark side of the Force through sheer power as much as by guile, though Luke would later be redeemed by his sister Leia and restored to the light side of the Force and defeat Palpatine once and for all. Shortly before his first death, Palpatine had sent a psychic command through the Force to Mara Jade, planting in her the need to kill Luke. She eventually fulfilled this command by slaying a clone of Luke called "Luuke Skywalker", whom Palpatine had made in an attempt to use him against the original, though this plot ultimately would fail due to Mara's fatal attack on the clone.

==== Darth Maul ====
Darth Maul was a Dathomirian Zabrak Sith Lord who served as the first apprentice of Darth Sidious. He first appeared in Star Wars: Episode I – The Phantom Menace, where he was ordered by his master to capture Queen Amidala of Naboo in order for her to sign a treaty that would legalize the Trade Federation's invasion of the planet. During a duel with Jedi Master Qui-Gon Jinn and his Padawan apprentice Obi-Wan Kenobi, who were assigned to protect Amidala, Maul killed the former but was sliced in half by Obi-Wan and fell down a shaft. Although presumed dead, he survived his injuries and ended up on the junk planet Lotho Minor, where he would become a cyborg and be driven to insanity. He was eventually rescued by his brother Savage Opress twelve years later, during the Clone Wars.

After being provided with a pair of new robotic legs by the Nightsisters, led by Maul's mother, Talzin, he sought revenge against Obi-Wan. This culminated with Maul allying with various crime syndicates, taking over the planet Mandalore, and killing Duchess Satine Kryze, whom Obi-Wan loved. Although he was then captured by his former master, Sidious, who came to see him as a rival, he managed to escape and rebuild his criminal empire. Following his overthrow and capture by the Galactic Republic, Maul escaped once again and went into hiding while no longer being a Sith Lord. During the reign of the Galactic Empire, Maul resurfaced as a crime lord and ran his syndicate, the Crimson Dawn, from the shadows, but was eventually stranded on the Sith world of Malachor. He escaped years later, after meeting Ezra Bridger, whom he then forced to assist in locating Obi-Wan. Finding him to be hiding on Tatooine, Maul fought his old nemesis one last time and was mortally wounded. Before dying, Maul took comfort in the fact that Obi-Wan was looking after who he believed to be the "Chosen One", who would one day avenge them by destroying the Sith.

==== Darth Tyranus ====
Darth Tyranus (Count Dooku) was a human Dark Lord of the Sith and the second apprentice of Darth Sidious, first appearing in Star Wars: Episode II – Attack of the Clones. Born to the royal family of the planet Serenno, Dooku was rejected by his family as an infant upon the discovery of his connection to the Force, which his father in particular feared and, as such, abandoned him after contacting the Jedi Order to come and take him to Coruscant. During his training under Yoda, Dooku proved himself to be both strong with the Force and a skilled duelist, regarded by many as one of the best in the Order. Upon becoming a Jedi Master, he left the Order and returned to Serenno to reclaim his title and heritage as a nobleman. He later fell to the dark side and became a Sith Lord and Darth Sidious's puppet.

Dooku helped Sidious with his galactic conquest plans, recruiting the bounty hunter Jango Fett as the template of the clone army that would be used by the Galactic Republic and forming the Confederacy of Independent Systems from various planets and systems that wanted to become independent from the Republic, resulting in the Clone Wars. Dooku served as the figurehead of the Separatist Alliance throughout the Clone Wars, until meeting his demise at the hands of Anakin Skywalker in Star Wars: Episode III – Revenge of the Sith. In his final moments, Dooku realized that Sidious had merely used him to aid his schemes, and had planned to have him killed and replaced by someone more powerful all along.

==== Darth Vader ====
Darth Vader (Anakin Skywalker) was a human-cyborg Dark Lord of the Sith and the third and final apprentice of Darth Sidious, who first appeared in the Star Wars original trilogy and later in the prequel trilogy. As the Jedi hero Anakin Skywalker, he fought alongside his master Obi-Wan Kenobi during the galaxy-wide Clone Wars, but was slowly seduced to the dark side by Darth Sidious, then Chancellor Palpatine, before his ascension to Emperor. After helping Sidious kill Jedi Master Mace Windu, he swore allegiance to the Sith and was given the name Darth Vader before setting out to destroy all Jedi left on Coruscant. After being sent by Sidious to assassinate the Separatist council members on Mustafar, Vader was badly injured in a duel with Kenobi, resulting in the loss of his remaining organic arm, both legs, and severe burn injuries. He was saved by Sidious and encased in a black suit of armor with extensive cybernetics, which kept him alive.

As the Galactic Empire was established and continued to grow, Vader became the Emperor's immensely feared second-in-command and was given the task of finding surviving Jedi and the Rebel Alliance's base. After the destruction of the first Death Star, Vader was charged with tracking down the Rebel Alliance and destroying their headquarters. However, the actions of his son, Luke Skywalker, eventually turned Vader against his master, resulting in both Sidious's and Vader's deaths, as well as the fulfillment of the Chosen One prophecy.

==== Darth Plagueis ====
Darth Plagueis was a Muun Dark Lord of the Sith and Darth Sidious's master, first referenced in Star Wars: Episode III - Revenge of the Sith. In the film, Sidious (as Palpatine) uses Plagueis's story to seduce Anakin Skywalker to the dark side, claiming that Plagueis's abilities in the Force grew to such an extent that he could create life by influencing microscopic Force-sensitive entities called "midi-chlorians" and even save people from death. According to the Rule of Two, Plagueis was eventually killed by Sidious in his sleep, who subsequently became the new Sith Master and would later take on an apprentice of his own.

Plagueis is the main character of the Legends novel, Star Wars: Darth Plagueis, which explains much of his backstory, including his training under Darth Tenebrous, mentorship of Palpatine, and early plans to undermine the Galactic Republic and drive the Jedi Order into ruins. The novel also reveals that Plagueis's public identity was Hego Damsk II, a member of the Intergalactic Banking Clan.

==== Darth Bane ====
Darth Bane (Dessel) was a human Dark Lord of the Sith and the sole survivor of the Sith Order in the aftermath of the ancient war between the Jedi and the Sith. He is best known for establishing the Rule of Two, which was considered the beginning of the modern Sith within the Star Wars canon. This law stated that there must be only two Sith Lords at a time: a master to embody power and an apprentice to crave it and eventually overthrow his/her master and adopt an apprentice of his/her own. He is the main character of the Darth Bane Trilogy by Drew Karpyshyn, which is part of the Legends continuity.

In the Star Wars canon, Darth Bane's backstory as the only Sith survivor of the Jedi-Sith war and the creator of the Rule of Two is mostly unchanged, though not much else is known about him. His only canonical appearance was in the episode "Sacrifice" of Star Wars: The Clone Wars, where his spirit was encountered by Yoda on the Sith homeworld of Moraband. It is revealed by the novelization of The Rise of Skywalker and Darth Sidious in his book, titled The Secrets of the Sith that the Rule of Two was a pale imitation, an unworthy but necessary successor to the Doctrine of the Dyad, which was a concept centered on a pairing of two Force-sensitive beings linked together by an unbreakable Force-bond—which made them one in the Force—called a Force dyad.

==== Darth Momin ====
Darth Momin was a humanoid Dark Lord of Sith who appeared in the comic book Darth Vader: Dark Lord of the Sith and briefly in Lando. Once a sculptor, he was imprisoned at a young age for his creations, which scared most people who saw them. Momin was eventually rescued by a Sith Lady named Shaa, who trained him in the dark side of the Force until he became more powerful than her and killed her. Momin then built a superweapon named Fermata Cage to destroy a city and perished when the Jedi intervened to stop him, losing control over the energy he wielded and causing his physical body to be destroyed, leaving behind only his mask with his spirit inside.

Many years later, the mask was retrieved from the Jedi Archive vault by Darth Sidious, who gave it to Darth Vader as a gift for his journey to Mustafar, which Vader sought to make his personal stronghold. After Momin's spirit killed some of his personnel, Vader examined the mask and learned of Momin's past, before letting him possess the body of a Mustafarian and build a fortress for him. Shortly after Momin finished building of the fortress, Vader was distracted by an invasion of Mustafarians, which Momin took advantage of to open the door to the Dark Side and resurrect himself.

However, after challenging Vader to a duel, Momin met a quick demise by being crushed with a giant rock. Despite Momin's death, his dark essence remained in the mask for several more years. At one point, Momin's mask was aboard the Imperial yacht Imperialis, when a group of thieves led by Lando Calrissian attempt to rob the ship. After Momin's spirit possessed the bodies of two thieves, the others were forced to abandon them and blow up the ship, seemingly destroying Momin's mask, and his spirit with it. Luke Skywalker later learned about Momin and his history during his travels across the galaxy, and described the Sith Lord's role in building Vader's fortress in his book, titled The Secrets of the Jedi.

==== Other canon Sith Lords ====
- Exim Panshard – A Sith Lord who held the title of Viceroy on a long-forgotten planet appeared vocally in the 2022 novel Shadow of the Sith. Exim wore a mask made of a meteoric metal, which was strong in the dark side of the Force. The mask contained the screams of a hundred innocent individuals slaughtered for the viceroy's pleasure and to give him power, enabling his own spirit to cling onto life through the mask. Yupe Tashu had later obtained the mask. After conferring with the spirits of fallen Sith, he gifted the mask to the Pantoran member of the Acolytes of the Beyond named Kiza. When her boyfriend Remi demanded the mask for himself, Yupe chastised him for angering the fallen specters. He also confiscated Remi's lightsaber and gave it to Kiza. Under the influence of Exim's mask, Kiza took part in an attack on a New Republic outpost on Devaron and killed Remi when he tried to reclaim his lightsaber. Exim's spirit made Kiza into his pawn on the promise she would get power if she brought him to the Sith planet Exegol, where he hoped he would be reborn to bring about a new era of Sith rule. However, Exim's plans were ruined after Jedi Master Luke Skywalker sensed his growing darkness. The quest for Exegol ended in defeat for Exim; after Kiza was killed and he took full control of her body, Luke destroyed his mask before it could claim him as its vessel, ending the threat of Exim once and for all.
- Darth Atrius – Ancient Dark Lord of the Sith who lived before Darth Bane and the modern Sith. He owned two crossguard lightsabers, which were found and given away by the smuggler Sana Starros after the Battle of Yavin. The anger possessed by Atrius when wielding both these crossguard lightsabers at the same time carried over to the weapons themselves and can transfer over to their new owners. These lightsabers were eventually destroyed by Darth Vader and Luke Skywalker, thus possibly erasing all knowledge about Atrius himself.
- Darth Caldoth – Duros Dark Lord of the Sith mentioned in the 2019 novel Myths & Fables. He lived at an unknown point in time before Star Wars: Episode I – The Phantom Menace and wrote a book titled The Bestiary of Darth Caldoth, which mentioned various Sith warbeasts. According to the legend, Caldoth eventually gained a Sith apprentice, the Twi'lek Ry Nymbis, and they were considered the two most powerful individuals in the galaxy at the time. Caldoth killed his apprentice with a Sith ritual that turned the person's body into stone when he felt Nymbis was going to betray him. With the ritual, Nymbis was trapped in an eternal nightmare.
- Darth Krall – Dark Lord of the Sith born as Radaki, who lived at an unknown point in time before Star Wars: Episode I – The Phantom Menace. He was first mentioned in the 2019 audiobook Dooku: Jedi Lost. Krall was seduced to the dark side after losing his faith in the Jedi Order, believing that the Jedi should retain their family ties and wealth. During his life, he fought in the Battle of Wasted Years, where the Sith emerged victorious, and tamed the Nightmare Conjunction. His lightsaber would later be stored in the Bogan Collection at the Jedi Temple on Coruscant.
- Darth Skrye – Dark Lady of the Sith mentioned in the audiobook Dooku: Lost Jedi. She lived at an unknown point in time before Star Wars: Episode I – The Phantom Menace. Her voice was heard by Count Dooku during his time as a Jedi Padawan, in a Force vision that he had after encountering the Presagers of Hakotei on Asusto. In this vision, Skrye claimed that the Sith were reborn and activated a superweapon called the Cauldron, which destroyed a planet. She also owned an artifact called the Hand of Skrye, which would eventually be found by the Jedi Lene Kostana and Sifo-Dyas on Rishi.
- Darth Wrend – Dark Lord of the Sith mentioned in the novel Master & Apprentice. He lived at an unknown point in time before Star Wars: Episode I – The Phantom Menace and was best known for coming back to life after being killed by the Jedi Order in order to fight them once again. The legend of Darth Wrend would come to Qui-Gon Jinn's mind during his time as a Padawan, who opened the holocron of prophecy, which contained numerous prophecies, many of which dated from ten thousand years ago. One of the prophecies said that evil would disappear yet appear again once the righteous had lost its light, which many believed was referring to the return of the Sith. At that time, Qui-Gon believed that the prophecy talked about Darth Wrend's return from the dead and that it had already been fulfilled; it would later be revealed that the prophecy was actually about the return of the Sith after living in secrecy for almost a millennium.
- Darth Tanis – Ancient Dark Lord of the Sith who lived at least 4000 years before Star Wars: Episode IV – A New Hope, as Sith accounts from the year 3966 BBY describe kyber weaponry developed by him on the planet Malachor. Darth Tanis is only mentioned in The Rise of Skywalker: The Visual Dictionary, where it is revealed that Darth Sidious's Sith Eternal cult named the 17th Legion of Sith Troopers after him.
- Darth Revan – Ancient Dark Lord of the Sith mentioned in The Rise of Skywalker: The Visual Dictionary, as the namesake of the 3rd Legion of Sith Troopers from Darth Sidious's Sith Eternal cult. Darth Revan is a more important figure in the Legends continuity, where he is the main protagonist of the video game Star Wars: Knights of the Old Republic, and a major character in related works. Once a Jedi hero of the Old Republic who led the Jedi to victory in the Mandalorian Wars, Revan later searched for the secret Sith Empire and was captured and tortured by the Sith Emperor, turning him to the dark side. After breaking free of the Emperor's control, Revan and his friend and Sith apprentice, Darth Malak, created their own Sith Empire using the ancient Star Forge to wage war on the Republic, but Malak eventually betrayed Revan and ordered his soldiers to fire on his ship during a battle against the Jedi. The wounded but still alive Revan was then captured by the Jedi, who erased his memories and gave him a new identity so that he could fight on their side once again. In the end, Revan defeated Malak and his Sith Empire and was regarded as a Jedi hero once more but was later captured by the Sith Emperor again and his psychic broke into a lighter half and a darker half. After being rescued by his descendant Satele Shan 300 years later, Revan's darker half sought to resurrect the Emperor's physical form so that he could kill him for good, but was defeated by the combined efforts of the Jedi, Sith, and his lighter half. The two halves of Revan then merged in peace and died for the final time.
- Darth Andeddu – Ancient Dark Lord of the Sith mentioned in The Rise of Skywalker: The Visual Dictionary as the namesake of the 5th Legion of Sith Troopers from Darth Sidious's Sith Eternal cult. Darth Andeddu is a more important figure in the Legends continuity, where he is one of the first known Sith Lords to have lived, as he preceded the creation of the "Darth" title. After being forced to flee from Korriban, Andeddu created the world of Prakith, over which he ruled as a deity for several centuries, before entombing himself to prevent his followers from stealing his secrets after his death. During his life, he created the first ever Sith holocron to store his knowledge, and discovered the ability to cheat death by transferring one's essence into another vessel.
- Darth Tenebrous – Dark Lord of the Sith mentioned in The Rise of Skywalker: The Visual Dictionary as the namesake of the 26th Legion of Sith Troopers from Darth Sidious's Sith Eternal cult. Darth Tenebrous is a more important figure in the Legends continuity, where he was Darth Plagueis's master and possessed an unusual ability to foresee the future, including his own death. He maintained a public persona as Rugess Tome, a legendary artisanal starship designer, and was forced to wear a breathing apparatus. Tenebrous hoped to possess the Chosen One once they would be revealed and gain immortality, but he was eventually betrayed and killed by Plagueis. Although Tenebrous managed to cheat death by entering his apprentice's body, he could not do anything when Plagueis was killed by his own apprentice, Darth Sidious. Unable to return to his original body or possess another person, Tenebrous was cursed to remain a vague spirit for the rest of eternity.
- Darth Phobos – Ancient Dark Lady of the Sith mentioned in The Rise of Skywalker: The Visual Dictionary as the namesake of the 39th Legion of Sith Troopers from Darth Sidious's Sith Eternal cult. Darth Phobos also exists in the Legends continuity, where she was a seductive Theelin Sith with mind manipulation abilities. She killed many of her fellow Sith in a bid for power and formed a cult to worship her but was ultimately killed by the combined forces of the Jedi and Sith. Her image was later incorporated in the training simulations at the Jedi Temple on Coruscant. This virtual representation of Phobos was fought by Starkiller in Star Wars: The Force Unleashed.
- Darth Desolous – Ancient Dark Lord of the Sith mentioned in The Rise of Skywalker: The Visual Dictionary as the namesake of the 44th Legion of Sith Troopers from Darth Sidious's Sith Eternal cult. Darth Desolous also exists in the Legends continuity, where he was a Pau'an warrior expelled from the Jedi Order due to his violent nature. He trained an army of fellow Pau'ans to fight them, but ended up falling into a trap set by the Jedi and perished in battle. His image was later incorporated in the training simulations at the Jedi Temple on Coruscant. This virtual representation of Desolous was fought by Starkiller in Star Wars: The Force Unleashed.
- "Qimir"/The Stranger – A High Republic-era Sith appearing in The Acolyte, portrayed by Manny Jacinto; the first apprentice of Darth Plagueis and the master of Mae-ho "Mae" Aniseya, he takes her on as an acolyte and has her enact her revenge upon the Jedi she deems responsible for the deaths. While posing as her own helper while hiding his face from her mind, Qimir attempts to execute Mae after she elects to betray him, slaughtering the squad of Jedi who had searched for her across the galaxy before looking after Mae's unconscious twin Osha.

==== Legends Sith Lords ====
Following the 2012 acquisition of Lucasfilm by The Walt Disney Company, Lucasfilm rebranded most of the licensed Star Wars novels, comics, and other fictional media published since the original 1977 film (previously identified as the Star Wars Expanded Universe) as Star Wars Legends and declared them non-canonical to the franchise in April 2014.

The Sith feature heavily in many stories of the Star Wars Expanded Universe (EU), appearing in a variety of media created prior to the advent of the 2015 feature film Star Wars: The Force Awakens. Future authors and screenwriters are not required to honor all of the events depicted in this material, but the Expanded Universe has remained a source of creative inspiration. The EU thoroughly details the schism between the dissident "Dark Jedi" and the Jedi establishment that led to the creation of the Sith Order, as well as a series of conflicts between the Sith, Jedi, and the Galactic Republic spanning the millennia prior to the events of the Star Wars motion picture series, and certain events thereafter.

In the EU, the Sith trace their origins to the followers of a dissident Jedi named Ajunta Pall, who endorsed the use of the Dark Side of the Force, contrary to Jedi orthodoxy. After Pall and his "Dark Jedi" followers were exiled for their practices, they eventually settled on a planet named Korriban, which was occupied by the "Sith," a red-skinned humanoid race with a high prevalence of Force-sensitives. Over the course of centuries of intermingling between the ethnic Sith and Dark Jedi, the name "Sith" would come to apply to the martial philosophy and political affiliation created by the former Jedi exiles on Korriban, rather than a specific race. This Sith regime would strike out at the Galactic Republic and Jedi on numerous occasions.

Notable conflicts between the Sith and the Galactic Republic include the "Great Hyperspace War," in which the Sith would launch a massive invasion of the Republic but succumb to infighting, and the "Sith Holocaust," in which the Galactic Republic failed in its attempt to exterminate the Sith from known space. This resulted in the Sith survivors taking a vow of eternal vengeance on the Galactic Republic. The EU also describes the exploits of Sith characters following the collapse of Emperor Palpatine's Galactic Empire and the restoration of the Republic, such as the attempt by "Darth Krayt" to establish a New Sith Order on Korriban.

The first Expanded Universe novel was Splinter of the Mind's Eye, written by Alan Dean Foster and published in 1978. The setting for the novel takes place between Episode IV: A New Hope and Episode V: The Empire Strikes Back. It provides a new adventure that includes Princess Leia, R2-D2, C-3PO, Luke Skywalker, and Darth Vader. In the story, Darth Vader tries to get the kyber crystal to use it for his evil schemes.

Other novels that depict Sith characters are Darth Maul: Saboteur and Cloak of Deception by James Luceno. Cloak of Deception describes the political background surrounding the Republic in the period before The Phantom Menace, as well as Darth Sidious's plans to rule the galaxy, starting with the blockade of Naboo.

In Darth Maul: Saboteur, the Sith Lord Darth Sidious sends Darth Maul to destroy InterGalactic Ore and Lommite Limited.

In Darth Maul: Shadow Hunter, by Michael Reaves, Darth Sidious sends his apprentice, Darth Maul, to investigate the traitor who leaked the secret of his plan to take down the Republic. Shadow Hunter provides insight into Sith psychology and details the manner in which Darth Sidious executed his plan of usurpation.

Dark Horse Comics purchased the copyrights to several Star Wars stories. With their publication of Star Wars: Dark Empire #1 in 1991, they initiated what has become a large line of Star Wars manga and comics. The Sith appear as major antagonists throughout this story's plot. Many of the comics that were published helped expand the backstory of the characters and followed the rise and fall of the Dark Lords of the Sith.

Star Wars video games have also been adapted from the plots of the films, novels, and TV shows. The games follow the basic plot of the story, but they can also include alternative, non-canonical endings depending on which character is being played. Some of the video games that have a heavy focus on Sith characters and lore are Star Wars: Knights of the Old Republic, released in 2003, Star Wars: Knights of the Old Republic II – The Sith Lords, released in 2004 and Star Wars: The Force Unleashed, released in 2008.

===== Darth Caedus =====
Darth Caedus (Jacen Solo) was a Dark Lord of the Sith born as the oldest son of Han Solo and Leia Organa Solo. A Jedi hero of the Yuuzhan Vong War, he eventually fell to the dark side years later and masterminded the Second Galactic Civil War. He was eventually killed by his twin sister Jaina for his actions.

===== Marka Ragnos =====
Marka Ragnos was an ancient Sith-human hybrid who lived during the time of the first Sith Empire and seized the title of Dark Lord of the Sith, serving as the ruler of the Empire. After his death, two Sith Lords, Naga Sadow and Ludo Kressh, fought to occupy his throne, only for Ragnos's spirit to appear before them and claim that only the most worthy should succeed him. Ragnos lived on as a Force spirit after his death, trapped within his tomb in the Valley of the Dark Lords on Korriban. A thousand years after the Dark Lord's death, Exar Kun summoned Ragnos from his grave through the use of talismans. Ragnos crowned Exar Kun as the new Dark Lord, with Ulic Qel-Droma as Kun's apprentice, as an attempt to resurrect the lost Empire thousands of years prior.

Several thousand years after that, in the video game Star Wars Jedi Knight: Jedi Academy (set during the New Republic era), a cult dedicated to Ragnos, led by the Dark Jedi Tavion Axmis, intended to resurrect the Sith Lord using an old artifact called the Scepter of Ragnos. After absorbing Force energy from numerous locations across the galaxy using the scepter, Tavion and her cult traveled to Korriban and almost succeeded in resurrecting Ragnos but were stopped by Luke Skywalker's New Jedi Order. Inside Ragnos's tomb, the Jedi Knight Jaden Korr defeated Tavion before Ragnos's spirit possessed her body, attempting to kill the Jedi himself. However, Jaden was able to defeat Ragnos, whose spirit left Tavion's body and returned to the depths of the Force, swearing revenge against the Jedi.

===== Darth Malak =====
Darth Malak (Alek) is the main antagonist of Star Wars: Knights of the Old Republic. Once a Jedi Knight and Revan's best friend, he fought alongside him in the Mandalorian Wars. Later, Alek and Revan unwittingly discovered the Sith Empire in the Unknown Regions and were captured by the Sith Emperor, who, using Sith sorcery, turned them to the dark side, but the two broke free from his control and formed their own separate Sith Empire using the Star Forge to wage war on the Republic, with Revan as the leader and Alek, now Darth Malak, as his Sith Apprentice.

At some point, Malak attempted to kill Revan and take over the Sith Empire for himself but was defeated and had his entire lower jaw cut off, forcing him to don a prosthetic jaw instead. Later, when Revan prepared to battle the Jedi who boarded his flagship, Malak betrayed him, ordering the ships under his command to fire on Revan's flagship's bridge so that he could take over the Sith Empire for himself. However, Revan survived the ordeal and was taken to the Jedi Council Enclave, where he had his memory wiped so that he would become a Jedi once again. Eventually, Revan faced off against Malak, who revealed the truth of his identity but was ultimately killed by him, which also led to the downfall of his Sith Empire.

===== Darth Traya =====
Darth Traya (Kreia) is a mentor to the "Jedi Exile" and the hidden main antagonist of Star Wars: Knights of the Old Republic II – The Sith Lords. She is revealed to have been a Sith Master at the end of the game, and is ultimately killed in battle.

===== Darth Sion =====
Darth Sion, also known as the Lord of Pain, is an antagonist in Star Wars: Knights of the Old Republic II – The Sith Lords. Alongside Darth Nihilus, he served as one of Traya's apprentices until ultimately betraying her and driving her into exile. Sion managed to achieve immortality by calling on his pain, anger, and hatred every time he was facing certain death, at the expense of all-consuming agony, which also led to his extremely disfigured appearance. The player's character eventually defeated Sion, and was then given the option to turn him back to the light side. Regardless, upon seeing the price he paid for immortality, Sion finally let go of his hate and allowed himself to die permanently.

===== Darth Nihilus =====
Darth Nihilus, also known as the Lord of Hunger, is an antagonist in Star Wars: Knights of the Old Republic II – The Sith Lords. Alongside Darth Sion, he served as one of Traya's apprentices until ultimately betraying her and driving her into exile. Nihilus imbued his dark soul into his mask and robes and had the power to drain the life force out of any living thing. Following the betrayal of his master, Nihilus used the might of the Sith Armada not to conquer planets, but to contain them so that he could "feed" off the Force energy of each planet's lifeforms, wiping planets of life. However, Nihilus was later drawn out and tricked into launching an attack on Telos, believing it to contain the last Jedi. The Exile confronted Nihilus on his ship, and Nihilus was killed either after his former slave Visas sacrificed herself due to their shared link in the Force or after his attempt to feast on the Exile's connection to the Force backfired and weakened him. Despite his death, Nihilus's soul would continue to live in his mask and robes for millennia to come, as well as inside his own Sith holocron.

===== Lord Vitiate =====
Known for much of his 1300-year life as "the Sith Emperor", Lord Vitiate was a sociopathic young Lord in one of the earliest iterations of the Sith Empire. When that empire fell, he led an exodus of survivors to the other side of the galaxy to establish a continuation of it, with himself as Emperor. It was Vitiate who corrupted Revan and Malak, but Revan's redemption and Malak's defeat seemingly derailed his plans. Three hundred years after Revan's disappearance, the Emperor launched a surprise attack on the Republic, setting the stage for the video game Star Wars: The Old Republic.

===== Darth Malgus =====
Darth Malgus (Veradun) is a major antagonist in Star Wars: The Old Republic. A human Dark Lord of the Sith who trained under Vindican, Malgus served the Sith Empire during the Great Galactic War against the Republic. Following the recapture of Korriban from the Jedi, Malgus killed his master and later led a surprise assault on Alderaan, only to be defeated by his nemesis and former opponent from Korriban, Satele Shan.

Malgus was severely injured in the fight against Shan, forcing him to wear a respiratory apparatus for the rest of his life. Sometime later, Malgus was tasked by his superior, Darth Angral, with leading an assault team on the Jedi Temple on Coruscant, which Malgus and his forces destroyed, disgracing the Jedi Order in the eyes of the Republic. Although Malgus believed that the Battle of Coruscant was the first step in destroying the Republic, it only served as leverage in the peace negotiations that took place on Alderaan. While the Alderaanian summit progressed, the Sith settled into an occupation of Coruscant. Malgus was placed in charge of orbital security, but the Sith Lord defied his orders and traveled back to Coruscant's surface to strike against the renegade Jedi Aryn Leneer, who wanted to avenge her master, Ven Zallow, killed by Malgus during the attack on the Jedi Temple. Although Leneer ultimately failed, the conflict caused Malgus to become disillusioned with the Empire and to kill his lover, Eleena Daru, seeing their relationship as a weakness that prevented him from preserving his position of power, which he later used to cleanse the Empire of the politicians whom he blamed for allowing the Republic to survive.

During the Cold War years that followed the successful peace negotiations, Malgus led Sith forces into the Unknown Regions, claiming previously unknown territories for the Empire. Towards the end of the war, following the presumed death of the Sith Emperor and his service on the Dark Council, Malgus formed his own empire, free of the infighting of the Dark Council. However, the Republic and the Sith Empire forces soon teamed up to fight against Malgus's empire and managed to track him down to his secret base, where they defeated him. Despite his apparent death, Malgus later resurfaced during the Invasion of Ossus at the start of the Third Galactic War, once again serving as a commander within the Sith Empire. However, following the Battle of Corellia, Malgus went rogue, determined to expunge all physical and mental restraints used to keep him under control. Thousands of years after his death, Malgus was still remembered as one of the most powerful Sith Lords to have ever lived. At one point, Darth Sidious acquired some surviving excerpts of Malgus's journals, which he bound into his Book of Sith, an anthology of Sith historical writings.

=== Sith Affiliates ===
Dark Side Force-wielders who use the dark side of the Force but do not follow the Sith ideology and, therefore, are not considered official Sith. Some can be trained by a Sith master as an informal apprentice or assassin, in which case they are called Sith Shadow Hands.

==== Canon ====
===== Asajj Ventress =====
Asajj Ventress was a Dathomirian Sith Shadow Hand trained under Darth Tyranus (Count Dooku) and an antagonist in Star Wars: The Clone Wars. She first appeared in the 2003 microseries Star Wars: Clone Wars, in which Darth Sidious assigned her to kill the then-Padawan Anakin Skywalker. After tracking the young war hero to the planet Muunilinst, Ventress engaged Anakin's Republic fighter forces fighting above the Separatist-occupied world and baited him in a chase to Yavin 4, where a fierce battle from the forest to the Massassi temple took place. Though she initially gained the upper hand in the ensuing lightsaber duel, Anakin called upon his immense connection to the Force to brutally overpower her, causing the Dathomirian to fall over the edge of a cliff. However, she survived the landing and continued to serve her master throughout the Clone Wars on several occasions.

In Star Wars: The Clone Wars, Ventress was a recurring antagonist during the first seasons, as she assisted Dooku with several schemes, most of which were thwarted by the Jedi. After being replaced with Savage Opress for her failures, Ventress returned to the Nightsisters until General Grievous led a massacre against them, which only she and Mother Talzin survived. From there, she helped Boba Fett's team of bounty hunters on a dangerous mission, which thus marked the start of her own bounty hunting career. Ventress later appeared in the novel Star Wars: Dark Disciple, which was intended for a story arc in the TV series. In the novel, she teamed up with Jedi Quinlan Vos to assassinate Dooku, and, along the way, the two fell in love. However, their attempt to kill Dooku failed, and Dooku captured Vos, turning him to the dark side. Ventress managed to turn Vos back but died saving him from Dooku. She was buried on Dathomir, amongst her fallen sisters.

===== Savage Opress =====
Savage Opress was a Dathomirian Zabrak Sith Shadow Hand first trained under Darth Tyranus (Count Dooku) and later under his own brother, Darth Maul, as well as a major antagonist in Star Wars: The Clone Wars. Originally a Nightbrother under Mother Talzin on Dathomir, he was handpicked by Asajj Ventress as part of her scheme to kill Dooku for the attempt on her life. He was eventually altered by the Nightsisters, making him more of a berserker on Ventress's call to the point of killing his brother Feral without remorse. Opress managed to become Tyranus's new Shadow Hand and learned only a little about the ways of the Sith before Ventress had him help her fight their master due to his actions under him getting unwanted attention from the Jedi. However, in the heat of the moment and provoked by both of them, Opress tried to kill both Tyranus and Ventress before escaping back to Dathomir. There, he was instructed by Mother Talzin to find Maul so that he could complete his training to defend himself against the numerous enemies he had made.

After finding his long-lost brother as a shell of his former self on a junk planet, Opress managed to stir up Maul's grudge with Obi-Wan Kenobi to aid him in his revenge against the Jedi. From there, the two Zabrak brothers were able to set up a Confederacy against the Republic separate from the Separatists and soon took over Mandalore. However, Darth Sidious, who considered Maul's sudden rise to power a threat to his rule, arrived on Mandalore and fought Maul and Opress. The latter met a quick demise as he was stabbed by Sidious's two lightsabers and died in his brother's arms moments later.

===== Quinlan Vos =====
Quinlan Vos was a Kiffar Jedi Master during the Clone Wars. Near the end of the war, he partnered with Asajj Ventress (who was working as a bounty hunter at the time) to assassinate Count Dooku. After being captured by Dooku, Vos willingly turned to the dark side and became his apprentice, in hopes he could discover the identity of Dooku's master, Darth Sidious. During his time as an agent for the Confederacy of Independent Systems, he became known as "Admiral Enigma". Vos was eventually turned back to the light side by Ventress, at the cost of her own life. After respectfully burying Ventress on her homeworld, Dathomir, Vos was reinstated into the Jedi Order and continued fighting in the Clone Wars on the Republic's side. He later presumably survived the Great Jedi Purge.

===== Inquisitorius =====
The Inquisitorius, formally known as the Inquisitors, were an organization of Force-sensitive warriors in the service of the Galactic Empire that became defunct at some point before A New Hope. In the Disney Star Wars universe all of them were former Jedi, who had lost their faith in the Jedi Order and succumbed to the dark side, during or shortly after the Clone Wars. They were all trained by the Sith Lord Darth Vader, who tasked them with hunting down other survivors of the Great Jedi Purge, as well as other Force-sensitive individuals, mostly children, to prevent them from becoming future Jedi.

- The Grand Inquisitor – The individual who would become known as the Grand Inquisitor was originally a Pau'an Jedi Temple Guard during the Clone Wars. After losing his faith in the Jedi Order and falling to the dark side, he came into service of the Empire and worked his way up its ranks to become the leader of the Inquisitors. The Grand Inquisitor was introduced as the main antagonist of the first season of Star Wars Rebels, where he was assigned to hunt down Kanan Jarrus and Ezra Bridger. He was eventually defeated by Kanan and chose to commit suicide rather than face the infamous wrath of Darth Vader for his failure. His light side essence later helped Kanan pass his final trial to become a Jedi Knight. In the Star Wars comic series, it was revealed that the Inquisitor's spirit was somehow tied by Darth Vader to an abandoned Jedi outpost on Tempes, where it briefly fought Luke Skywalker and where it was cursed to stay forever, unable to pass on and become one with the Force.
- The First Brother — Marrok was a former humanoid Jedi who lost his faith in the Jedi and became an Inquisitor known as the First Brother after the rise of the Empire. Marrok was introduced in Ahsoka, portrayed by Paul Darnell, where he became a mercenary working for the Nightsister Morgan Elsbeth, after the fall of the Empire. During his time with Morgan Elsbeth's forces, Marrok worked with former Jedi General Baylan Skoll, and his apprentice Shin Hati, and aided Elsbeth in her quest to find Grand Admiral Thrawn. He engaged Ahsoka Tano in a lightsaber duel during a mission on Corellia. Later, Marrok confronted Ahsoka once more on Seatos, where the former Jedi hunter was killed by Tano's blade.
- The Second Sister – Trilla Suduri was the Padawan of Jedi Knight Cere Junda and one of the few survivors of the Great Jedi Purge. After Cere was captured and interrogated by the Empire, she betrayed Trilla's location, leading to her being captured and tortured by the Empire as well, until giving into the dark side and becoming the Second Sister Inquisitor. She initially made a cameo appearance in the comic book Darth Vader: Dark Lord of the Sith, and later served as the main antagonist of the video game Star Wars Jedi: Fallen Order, voiced by Elizabeth Grullon, where she was tasked with hunting Jedi Padawan Cal Kestis, as well as a holocron containing a list of Force-sensitive children. Although she succeeded in securing the holocron, she was eventually defeated by Kestis and Cere at the Inquisitor headquarters on the planet Nur. Cere then attempted to make amends with her former Padawan, but Darth Vader appeared and executed Trilla for failing her mission. She also briefly appears in Star Wars Zero Company, having reached out to several Jedi, including former Padawan and Zero Company member Tel-Rea Vokoss, one year after the formation of the Empire to meet on Dantooine ostensibly to coordinate resistance efforts. In reality, this was a trap set by the Second Sister that saw several Jedi and their sympathizers slaughtered. She attempted to recruit Tel-Rea into the Inquisitorius, and when that failed she attempted to kill the group, but she was repelled after being pushed off a ledge by her former friend.
- The Third Sister – Reva Sevander was a youngling of the Jedi Temple on Coruscant and one of the few survivors of the Great Jedi Purge. Reva was introduced as the main antagonist of the first season of Obi-Wan Kenobi, portrayed by Moses Ingram, where, recruited to the Inquisitorius after living on the streets, she secretly plots revenge against Darth Vader for killing her peers during Order 66, having survived being stabbed through the stomach by him during the Purge, seeking to track down and kill Vader's former Jedi master Obi-Wan Kenobi for allowing his apprentice to fall to the dark side, and arranging the kidnapping of Leia Organa to lure Kenobi out of hiding. After the Grand Inquisitor attempts to take credit for her tracking down of Kenobi, Reva stabs him through the stomach, apparently killing him, and convinces Vader to appoint her as the new Grand Inquisitor in his stead. After Kenobi rescues Leia from Reva's forces before the inquisitor can personally torture her for information, Reva tracks down Kenobi again, who surmises her past as a youngling and offers her an opportunity to take her revenge on Vader. When Reva attempts to engage Vader in combat, he effortlessly disarms her without using a lightsaber before stabbing her through the gut with a lightsaber again. The Grand Inquisitor, revealing himself to be alive, takes back his ranking before leaving Reva in the gutter to die. However, after Vader and the Grand Inquisitor leave, Reva finds a message left for Kenobi by Bail Organa, revealing to her that Vader's son, Luke Skywalker, is hidden on Tatooine, under the protection of Owen Lars, whom she had previously met there while hunting Jedi. Proceeding to Tatooine, Reva attempts to kill an unconscious Luke, but, reminded of her younger self, elects to spare him. On Kenobi's return, he forgives Reva for her actions, informing her that she can do whatever she wants with her life.
- The Fourth Sister – The Fourth Sister is an Inquisitor appearing for the first time in Obi-Wan Kenobi, portrayed by Rya Kihlstedt. She participated in the pursuit of Obi-Wan Kenobi.
- The Fifth Brother – The Fifth Brother was a former green-skinned humanoid member of the Jedi Order who eventually lost his faith in the Order and became an Inquisitor sometime after the rise of the Empire. He was introduced in the second season of Star Wars Rebels, where he and the Seventh Sister were tasked with hunting the Ghost crew after the Grand Inquisitor's death, during which they also competed against each other to become the next Grand Inquisitor. The Fifth Brother was eventually defeated after dueling Kanan Jarrus, Ezra Bridger, Ahsoka Tano, and Maul on Malachor, being disarmed by Ahsoka and subsequently killed by Maul.
- The Sixth Brother – Bil Valen was a former humanoid Jedi Knight who eventually lost his faith in the Jedi Order and became the Sixth Brother Inquisitor sometime after the rise of the Empire. He was described as tall with unnatural-looking grey skin, piercing ice-blue eyes, broad shoulders, and distinctive scar/tattoo-like markings, and was also shown to have lost an arm to Darth Vader during one of his training sessions. The Sixth Brother was first introduced in the Ahsoka novel, where he was tasked with hunting Ahsoka Tano but was ultimately defeated by her after she caused his lightsaber to overload and explode, killing him. He later appeared in the comic book Darth Vader: Dark Lord of the Sith, set before the novel.
- The Seventh Sister – The Seventh Sister was a former Mirialan member of the Jedi Order who eventually lost her faith in the Order and became an Inquisitor sometime after the rise of the Empire. She was introduced in the second season of Star Wars Rebels, where she was shown to be using small droids to help her track down her targets and was also working closely with the Fifth Brother, as they were both tasked with hunting the Ghost crew after the Grand Inquisitor's death, during which they also competed against each other to become the next Grand Inquisitor. The Seventh Sister was eventually defeated by Maul on Malachor and subsequently killed by him, after Ezra Bridger refused to do so.
- The Eighth Brother – The Eighth Brother was a former Terrelian Jango Jumper member of the Jedi Order who eventually lost his faith in the Order and became an Inquisitor sometime after the rise of the Empire. He was introduced in the second-season finale of Star Wars Rebels, where he was tasked with hunting the former Sith Darth Maul, eventually tracking him down to Malachor. He dueled Maul, Kanan Jarrus, Ezra Bridger, and Ahsoka Tano alongside his fellow Inquisitors, the Fifth Brother and the Seventh Sister, but the latter two were ultimately killed by Maul. Cornered, the Eighth Brother then attempted to escape, but his lightsaber had been damaged during the battle and exploded in his hands when he tried to use it to fly away, causing him to fall to his death.
- The Ninth Sister – Masana Tide was a former Dowutin Jedi Knight who eventually succumbed to the dark side and became the Ninth Sister Inquisitor after intense torture at the hands of the Empire. She first appeared in the comic book Darth Vader: Dark Lord of the Sith, where she assisted Darth Vader, the Sixth Brother, and the Tenth Brother in hunting the Jedi Ferren Barr on the planet Mon Cala. After Barr used the Force to turn the Imperial stormtroopers present against them, the Ninth Sister was betrayed by the Sixth Brother, who severed her right foot and left her behind to die so that he could escape, although she managed to survive. She later appeared as an antagonist in the video game Star Wars Jedi: Fallen Order, where she joined the Second Sister in the hunt for Cal Kestis. The Ninth Sister was ultimately defeated by the Jedi Padawan on Kashyyyk, who severed her right hand. However, she survived death once again. She was later killed by Cal Kestis on Coruscant during the events of Star Wars Jedi: Survivor.
- The Tenth Brother – Prosset Dibs was a former Miraluka Jedi Master during the Clone Wars who eventually became disillusioned by the Jedi's role as protectors of the galaxy. He first appeared in the comic book Jedi of the Republic - Mace Windu, where he tried to kill Mace Windu during a mission on the planet Hissrich. He was defeated and subsequently expelled from the Jedi Order for his actions. Dibs later became the Tenth Brother Inquisitor in the service of the Empire and appeared in the comic book Darth Vader: Dark Lord of the Sith, where he assisted Darth Vader, the Sixth Brother, and the Ninth Sister in hunting the Jedi Ferren Barr on the planet Mon Cala. After Barr used the Force to turn the Imperial stormtroopers present against them, the Tenth Brother was killed in the ensuing fight.
- The Eleventh Brother – The Crow was an Inquisitor who joined the First Brother to hunt Darth Maul after the former inquisitor confirmed the ex-Sith's presence on Janix. He later searched for Ahsoka Tano. He is defeated by Ahsoka with his own lightsaber, after she disarms him. Clancy Brown voices the Eleventh Brother in "Resolve", the first-season finale of Tales of the Jedi (2022).
- The Thirteenth Sister – Iskat Akaris was a red-skinned Inquisitor appeared in the comic book Darth Vader: Dark Lord of the Sith, where she assisted Darth Vader, the Fifth Brother, and another black-skinned Twi'lek Inquisitor in hunting Jedi Master Eeth Koth. While Vader dueled and killed Koth, Iskat found his wife and baby daughter but refused to kill them, instead taking the latter and bringing her to Vader, who then left her in the care of some nursemaids. Later, the Fifth Brother informed Vader of her actions, and, believing it to be an act of treason, he tried to kill her in front of the other Inquisitors. She managed to escape with the help of her fellow Twi'lek Inquisitor, but they were both eventually caught following a chase through Coruscant. Vader froze them with the Force and killed them. Iskat is the protagonist of the novel Inquisitor: Rise of the Red Blade, which reveals her backstory as a Jedi who is recruited into the Inquisitorius.
- Tualon Yaluna – Tualon Yaluna is a black-skinned Twi'lek Inquisitor who appeared in the comic book Darth Vader: Dark Lord of the Sith, where he assisted Darth Vader, the Fifth Brother and Iskat in hunting Jedi Master Eeth Koth. Later, when Vader tried to kill Iskat for treason, he helped her escape, but they were both eventually caught following a chase through Coruscant. Vader froze them with the Force and killed them. Tualon appears as one of the central characters in the novel Inquisitor: Rise of the Red Blade.

===== Snoke =====
Snoke was a Force-sensitive artificial being created by Darth Sidious and his Sith Eternal cult on Exegol and a major antagonist in the Star Wars sequel trilogy. After Sidious's death and the fall of the Empire, Snoke became the Supreme Leader of the First Order and seduced Ben Solo to the dark side, training him to become his apprentice, Kylo Ren. He was also behind the destruction of Luke Skywalker's Jedi Temple and the deaths of most of his students in an attempt to wipe out the Jedi Order once and for all. He was ultimately killed by Kylo after failing to foresee his betrayal. Following Snoke's death, Kylo took over as Supreme Leader of the First Order until he redeemed himself like his grandfather before him.

===== Kylo Ren =====
Kylo Ren (Ben Solo) was a former Jedi and powerful dark side wielder, and the secondary antagonist of the Star Wars sequel trilogy. He was born as the son of Leia Organa and Han Solo, and trained under his uncle, Luke Skywalker, to become a Jedi, but was seduced to the dark side by Snoke. Adopting the alias Kylo Ren, he helped eliminate his uncle's new generation of Jedi and became the leader of the Knights of Ren and a high-ranking member of the First Order. He trained under Snoke to become a powerful dark side wielder, and later proved his loyalty by killing his father when he tried to help him get redeemed. However, Kylo eventually betrayed and killed his master after siding with the Jedi Padawan Rey, with whom he shared a unique connection called a "dyad in the Force". However, instead of turning back to the light side, he took over as the new Supreme Leader of the First Order, and invited Rey to join him, but she refused.

Later, Kylo confronted Luke, only to discover that he was a Force projection, meant to distract him and allow the Resistance to escape; nonetheless, Luke died as a result of the effort to create the projection, leaving Rey the only living Jedi. Eventually, Kylo discovered that Darth Sidious was alive and plotted to kill this potential rival but instead sided with him after the latter revealed the Final Order, a massive fleet of Xyston-class Star Destroyers built by the Sith Eternal, which he promised to give Kylo control of in exchange for killing Rey, revealed to be his granddaughter. However, Kylo planned to have Rey join him so that they could kill Sidious and take over the galaxy for themselves, but she refused and attacked him. During the duel, Kylo was distracted by his mother reaching out to him through the Force (at the cost of her life), allowing Rey to defeat him. After a conversation with a memory of his late father, Ben Solo was redeemed and came to Rey's aid in defeating Sidious. After Rey died killing the Sith Lord, Ben revived her using the Force, at the cost of his life.

===== Knights of Ren =====
The Knights of Ren were an organization of masked Force-wielding warriors who serve as antagonists in the Star Wars sequel trilogy. The Knights were neither Sith nor Jedi but a new generation of dark side warriors that emerged to fill the void left by the supposed demise of the last Sith Lords, Darth Sidious and Darth Vader. The Knights of Ren did not adhere to any code, willing to do anything to triumph. Their name came from a lightsaber called the "Ren", which could only be wielded by their leader. The Knights consisted of ten individuals named Marinda, Massif, Fyodor, Bazzra, Ap'lek, Cardo, Kuruk, Trudgen, Ushar, and Vicrul and were originally led by a man named Ren, who knew Supreme Leader Snoke. After Ben Solo's fall to the dark side, they allowed him to join and demanded that he get one "good death" to prove himself. Ben eventually killed Ren himself and became the new leader of the Knights, Kylo Ren, in addition to killing fellow former Jedi Padawan Voe. In The Rise of Skywalker, six remaining Knights (Ap'lek, Cardo, Kuruk, Trudgen, Ushar, and Vicrul) join Darth Sidious's Sith Eternal following Kylo's redemption and are killed by the latter on Exegol.

==== Starkiller ====
Starkiller (born Galen Marek) was the informal apprentice of Darth Vader, and the protagonist of the Star Wars: The Force Unleashed video games and literature. Born to a fugitive Jedi Knight after the Clone Wars, he was unnaturally strong in the use of the Force. Vader realized his potential when he came to kill his father, and subsequently raised him as his secret apprentice, giving him the code name "Starkiller". When he reached adulthood, Starkiller was sent to eliminate several fugitive Jedi, only to then be betrayed by Vader. Eventually, Starkiller turned to the light side and assisted in the formation of the Rebel Alliance, before defeating his former master and sacrificing himself for the Rebellion in a fight against Darth Sidious. Vader later cloned Starkiller in hopes of creating the perfect apprentice, but the clone followed the same path as the original Starkiller: turning to the light side and joining the Rebellion.

==== Tol Skorr ====
Tol Skorr was a human former Jedi Knight that was trained under Darth Tyranus (Count Dooku). He served as Dooku's bodyguard during the Clone Wars and was very much disliked by Quinlan Vos. When Vos was revealed to have been spying on Dooku, Skorr and Asajj Ventress were sent to kill Vos. Skorr was ultimately killed by Vos, who Force-pushed him into lava.

==== HK-47 ====
HK-47 was a Hunter-Killer-series assassin droid introduced in the video game Star Wars: Knights of the Old Republic. He was constructed by Darth Revan in the aftermath of the Mandalorian Wars and was sent throughout the galaxy on missions by the Sith Lord and assassinated those deemed by Revan as threats to galactic stability.

==== Bastila Shan ====
Bastila Shan was a Jedi Master introduced in the video game Star Wars: Knights of the Old Republic. Shan used the Force to stabilize Darth Revan, who was near death after his ship had been fired upon in an act of betrayal by his apprentice Darth Malak. This act created a bond between Shan and Revan, and Shan eventually fell in love with Revan while they were tasked with finding the Star Forge shipyard (Revan was retrained as a Jedi after his memories were erased by the Jedi Council). While hunting for the shipyard, Shan and Revan, who were accompanied by Carth Onasi, were captured by Malak. After escaping their cells aboard Malak's flagship, Shan was imprisoned by Malak after a duel to allow Revan and Onasi to escape from the Sith. After a week of torture by Malak, Shan fell to the dark side and took her place as Malak's apprentice. In time, Shan would duel Revan, Jolee Bindo, and Juhani (Star Wars), and, while she was no match for the Jedi, attempted to convince Revan to join her to become the Dark Lord of the Sith. Revan rejected the offer and made the choice of a true Jedi. Later on, after being defeated by Darth Revan in a duel on the Star Forge, Bastila was convinced to return to the path of the light, renouncing the dark side and confessing her love for Revan. Revan went on to defeat Darth Malak upon the Star Forge before he and Bastila were married on Coruscant.

=== Sith Eternal ===
The 2019 film Star Wars: The Rise of Skywalker depicts thousands of Sith cultists and loyalists known as the Sith Eternal. They are the overarching antagonistic faction of the Star Wars sequel trilogy. They are located on the Sith planet Exegol, which is described in the film as the "hidden world of the Sith". The film depicts the Sith loyalists as having built the Final Order, a massive fleet of Xyston-class Star Destroyers, at the behest of Darth Sidious. They are also revealed to have artificially created and cloned Snoke, whom a resurrected Sidious uses as a puppet to control the First Order and seduce Kylo Ren to the dark side. At the end of the film, the Sith Eternal cultists are present during Sidious's rejuvenation through the Force and his demise at the hands of Rey, the last Jedi and Sidious's own granddaughter. The Sith Eternal cultists are crushed to death after the explosion following Sidious's death.

The novelization of The Rise of Skywalker develops the story of how Sidious transferred his consciousness into the cloned body the Sith Eternal prepared for him.

== In popular culture ==
Sith Lords Darth Vader and Darth Sidious have become iconic villains in popular culture. Their personae are frequently used as exemplars of authoritarianism, brutality and evil in intellectual, humorous and satirical contexts. Palpatine is representative of the "Dark Lord" archetype, a tyrant figure who rules through deception, propaganda, fear, and oppression to achieve their aspirations of absolute power. Although usually considered an enforcer of evil, Darth Vader is also regarded as a tragic figure, a study in the corruption of a hero who loses sight of the greater good and falls from grace out of fear and desperation.

A "turn to the Dark Side" has become a popular idiom to describe an (often misguided) individual's or institution's embrace of evil out of a desire for power.

The word "Sith" is also used in Internet memes as an anagrammatic substitute in toilet humor jokes like "Sith happens".

== See also ==
- Black magic
- Satanism
- Jedi
