= Bob Weis =

American amusement park designer and author

- Born: Robert Weis
- Education: California State Polytechnic University, Pomona (BS)
- Employer(s): Walt Disney Imagineering (1980–2022); Gensler (2023–present)
- Website: bobweis.com

Robert Weis is an American amusement park designer, architect, and author who served as president of Walt Disney Imagineering from 2016 to 2021. During his four-decade career as an Imagineer, he oversaw the design and development of Disney's Hollywood Studios and the Shanghai Disney Resort.

Weis joined Walt Disney Imagineering in 1980, relocating to Japan to work on Tokyo Disneyland and later playing a major role in the conceptual design of Tokyo DisneySea. He led the expansion of Disney California Adventure, including the addition of Cars Land, and the creative development of the Disney Wish. Weis became the Global Ambassador for Imagineering in 2022, before retiring to join the architectural firm Gensler.

== Early life and education ==
Weis was raised in Southern California, where he visited Disneyland on his birthday every year.

While studying at California State Polytechnic University, Pomona, Weis worked as a Disneyland cast member, selling popcorn and ice cream. After starting as a theatre major, he graduated from Cal Poly Pomona in 1980 with a degree in architecture.

== Career ==
=== Themed entertainment ===
Shortly after graduating from California State Polytechnic University, Pomona, Weis joined Walt Disney Imagineering in 1980. Within eight months of joining the company, he had relocated to Japan to join the team building Tokyo Disneyland. Following his leadership role in the conceptualization and design of Tokyo DisneySea, he left Imagineering to start his own consulting firm, Design Island. As a consultant, Weis worked on multiple museum projects with the Museum of Science and Industry in Chicago, the Smithsonian Institution, and Microsoft co-founder Paul Allen.

Weis returned to Imagineering to oversee creative redevelopment of Disney California Adventure, which was less popular than the main Anaheim park Disneyland. This five year endeavor included the addition of the World of Color nighttime show, a redesign of the park's entrance, and the creation of Cars Land. From 2008 to 2016, he led the creative team that designed and built the Shanghai Disney Resort. Over the course of his career, Weis has been involved with leading projects totaling more than $30 billion in value.

After Shanghai Disneyland opened in 2016, Weis was named president of Walt Disney Imagineering. During his tenure as president, he was involved with multiple Star Wars projects that followed the acquisition of Lucasfilm by The Walt Disney Company. These included the themed area Galaxy's Edge in California and Florida, the rides Millennium Falcon – Smugglers Run and Rise of the Resistance, and the experiential hotel Galactic Starcruiser. He also oversaw the development of the ride Mickey & Minnie's Runaway Railway at Walt Disney World.

Weis left the position of president to become the company's Global Imagineering Ambassador in 2022, a position previously held by Marty Sklar, before retiring from the company at the end of that year.

=== Architecture ===
Following his retirement from Walt Disney Imagineering, architectural firm Gensler announced that Weis would join the company as its new Global Immersive Experience Design Leader. Weis's new role at the firm was reported in connection with Gensler designing the Universal Kids Resort in Frisco, Texas.

In 2024, Savannah College of Art and Design named Weis as their Executive in Residence.

=== Books ===
In 2024, Weis's nonfiction book Dream Chasing was published by Disney Editions, with a foreword by Bob Iger. That same year, he published a young adult novel about The Haunted Mansion at Disneyland called Ghost Dog.

== Bibliography ==
- Dream Chasing: My Four Decades of Success and Failure with Walt Disney Imagineering, Disney Editions, 2024
- Ghost Dog: A Novel, The Old Mill Press, 2024

== Awards and honors ==
In November 2020, Weis was announced as the winner of the Buzz Price Thea Award for a Lifetime of Outstanding Achievement by the Themed Entertainment Association.

In 2021, Weis was awarded a Doctor of Humane Letters by his alma mater, California State Polytechnic University, Pomona, for his professional and philanthropic accomplishments.

At a 2023 ceremony, Walt Disney World unveiled an honorary window at Disney's Hollywood Studios for Weis. Themed after the former Walt Disney Imagineering president, it reads, "Flower Street Pictures, Bob Weis, Studio Head, Our Productions Entertain the World."
