= Studio Backlot Tour =

Defunct attraction at Disney Hollywood Studios, now demolished

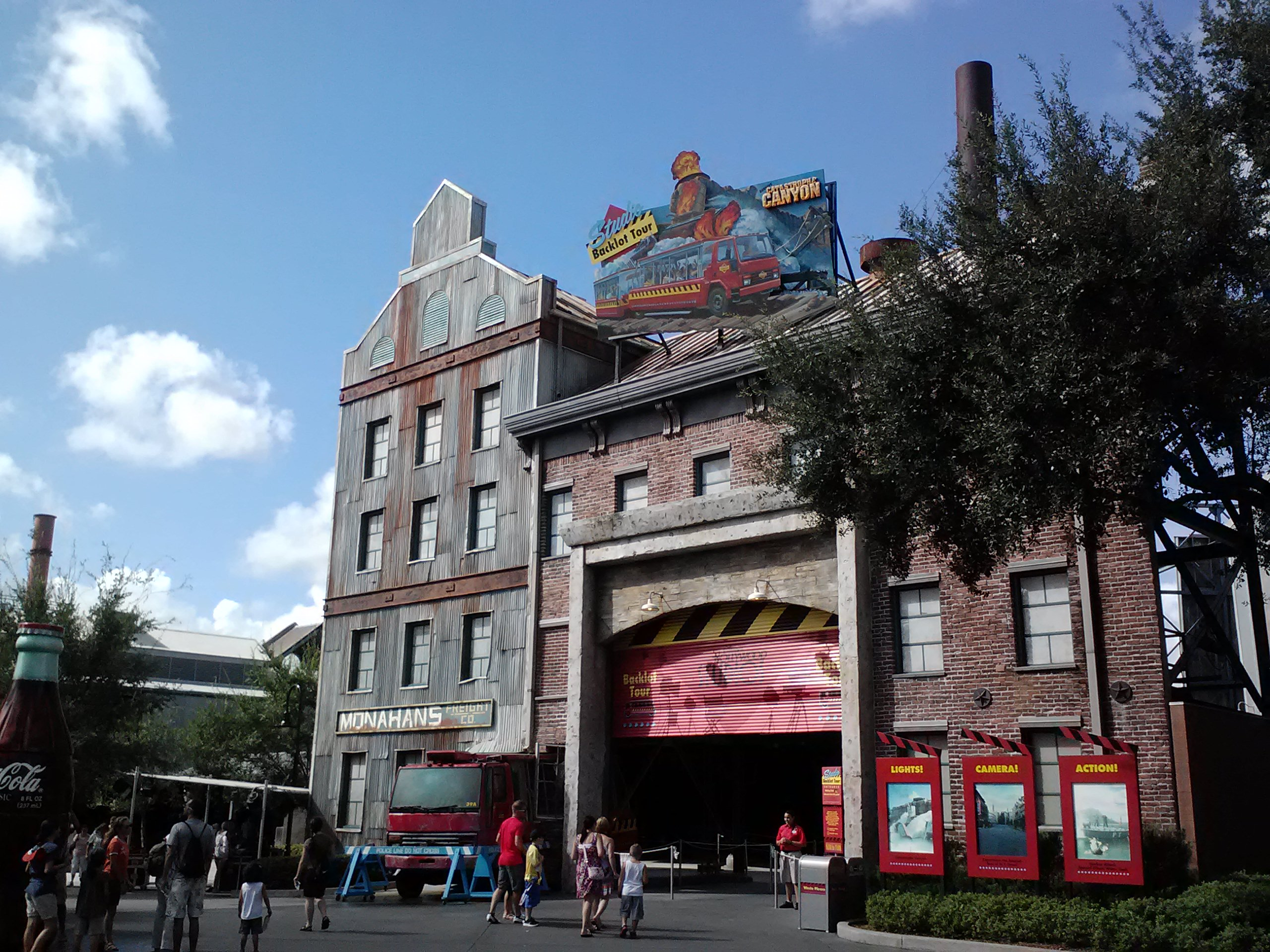
- Attraction's entrance

Disney's Hollywood Studios
- Area: Streets of America
- Coordinates: 28°21′18″N 81°33′42″W
- Status: Removed
- Opening date: May 1, 1989
- Closing date: September 28, 2014
- Replaced by: Toy Story Land; The Magic of Disney Animation (Animation Courtyard)

Ride statistics
- Attraction type: Tram tour
- Designer: Walt Disney Imagineering
- Theme: Back-lot tour of a working film studio
- Vehicle type: Tram
- Riders per vehicle: 200
- Duration: 35 minutes
- Included attractions: Catastrophe Canyon
- Wheelchair accessible
- Assistive listening available
- Closed captioning available

The Studio Backlot Tour was an attraction at Disney's Hollywood Studios at the Walt Disney World Resort in Lake Buena Vista, Florida. It was a combination of a walking and tram tour of the backlot area of the park.

Originally the park's premier attraction, its final operating day, after years of downscaling, for newer experiences not announced at the time, was on September 27, 2014; the ride then closed September 28. In August 2015, it was announced that the area would be used for Toy Story Land. The entire attraction has now been demolished.

== History ==
=== Original ride ===
Attraction's marquee

The first incarnation of the Backlot Tour loaded at the former entrance to The Magic of Disney Animation. The original tour was far longer and more elaborate than the final version. The former tour originally drove through New York Street/Streets of America. However, due to the surprise popularity of the park, New York Street was removed from the tour and made into a public walking space within the first few years of operation. It remained open to pedestrians until April 2, 2016 when Streets of America closed. After driving through New York Street, the tram drove to Catastrophe Canyon.

After visiting the canyon, guests disembarked at the final tour's exit area. The area where Studio Catering Co. restaurant & the adjacent shop stood until Streets of America closed was originally a break area for guests before embarking on the second half of the Backlot tour. This break area was expanded to include an area for kids to play, called Honey, I Shrunk the Kids: Movie Set Adventure. The second half of the tour was a walking tour. It encompassed the water special effects tank, an effects shop, and the existing soundstages along Mickey Avenue and the soundstages that currently house Walt Disney: One Man's Dream and Voyage of the Little Mermaid. Guests viewed the soundstages using overhead walkways. Portions of the walkway can still be seen in the park. Most noticeably, by the most recent Backlot Tour entrance and by the former The Legend of Captain Jack Sparrow entrance, there are walkway bridges. Just like New York Street, due to the overwhelming popularity of Disney's Hollywood Studios, former Backlot areas were opened up to guests (present day Mickey Avenue & southern Animation Courtyard).

By 1991, much of the former walking portion of the Backlot Tour became its own attraction, Backstage Pass, separate from the backlot tour, with the entrance at the end of Mickey Avenue. This greatly reduced the overall Tour time.

In 1996, the entrance to the Backlot Tour was moved to replace the Backstage Pass entrance at the end of Mickey Avenue, with a new entrance ramp built to the water effects tank, a prop warehouse building constructed for additional queue, and a new loading area for the trams. The Backstage Pass entrance then moved next door.

In 2001, Backstage Pass was closed. In April 2001, Soundstage 3 opened to the public to house Who Wants To Be A Millionaire - Play It! and was closed in 2006. In 2008, Soundstage 3 and the adjacent Soundstage 2 were converted into the Toy Story Midway Mania! attraction. Soundstage 1 previously housed a gift shop for "Star Wars Weekends". In the summer of 2014, it housed "Wandering Oaken's Trading Post and Sauna". Currently, it houses the third track to the popular Toy Story Midway Mania!.

The adjacent building, an unnamed enclosed area and theater, housed for many years an attraction called "The Making of ______" (the blank filled in with the name of the next upcoming film from either Walt Disney Pictures or Touchstone Pictures). When the walking tour was removed from the Backlot Tour, this became a separate attraction, the previously mentioned Backstage Pass attraction. In 2001, the space was converted into Walt Disney: One Man's Dream. Originally the display area of the building emptied into the theater currently occupied by Voyage of The Little Mermaid. Within months of the park's opening, the theater became a separate venue from the walking tour portion of the Backlot Tour. The first show in the new separate theater was Here Come the Muppets. When the original theater was separated, a new slightly smaller theater was built right behind it for "The Making of" attraction. This is the current theater guests enter in Walt Disney: One Man's Dream.

=== Refurbishment ===
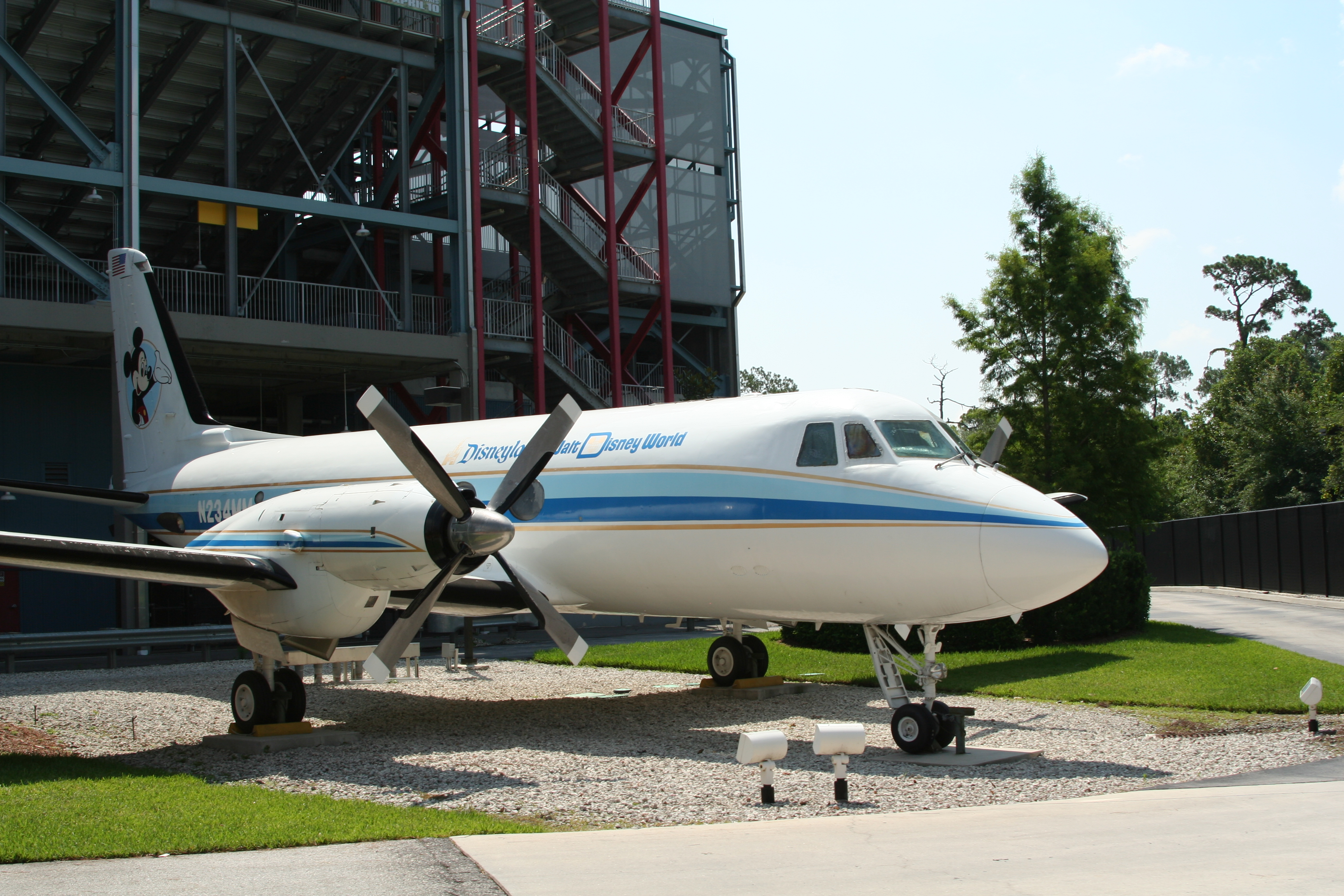
Walt Disney's private airplane on display

In 2003, Residential Street was walled off from the tour and demolished. The land was used for Lights, Motors, Action!: Extreme Stunt Show, which debuted alongside Soarin' at Epcot two years later in 2005, coinciding with the Happiest Celebration on Earth festival. The addition of the stunt show caused the Backlot Tour to be re-routed to go around the large stadium. Small portions of the former residential street were turned into areas for the tour's relocated and downsized boneyard and for the tram roadways. The addition of the stunt show also caused NY Street to lose its arch, as the area was needed for the tour tram to turn around to arrive at the exit station. Overall, the tram portion of the tour was obviously greatly reduced due to the new stunt show.

In 2008, Imagineering announced to cast members that an automated narration spiel was in development to replace all the live tour guides on the shuttles portion of the tour. The Special Effects Water Tank, due to guest volunteers, continued to have a live cast until the attraction closed. The entire attraction went down for two months' refurbishment on January 4, 2009. The ride briefly closed down in February 2010, along with the adjacent Studio Catering Company and Honey I Shrunk the Kids Movie Set Adventure. It was the final refurbishment before the attraction closed.

=== Closure ===
On September 20, 2014, it was announced to cast members that the ride would permanently close on September 27, 2014 for the orchestral facility. On September 28, the marquee and the sign that were at the entrance were removed and painted over. At the time of the attraction's closing, there was no word as to what would replace it. However, it was later announced at the D23 Expo 2015 that the land taking up the Backlot Tour, as well as the majority of the Streets of America area would make room for Star Wars: Galaxy's Edge and Toy Story Land. The Catastrophe Canyon section was demolished first in early 2016. Demolition began in mid-2016.

== Attractions ==
=== The queue area ===
Upon entering the queue, guests were put into four different lines underneath a large canopy. Throughout the area were props from different movies, including Pearl Harbor, Pirates of the Caribbean: The Curse of the Black Pearl, The Rock, and Armageddon. A film also looped with director Michael Bay telling guests how some of the special effects scenes from Pearl Harbor were filmed. While guests were waiting, four volunteers were chosen to be used in the first part of the attraction.

=== Walking tour ===
A number of guests in each line were taken into a show area with a large water tank in front of them. In the water tank were props reminiscent of Pearl Harbor: the deck and the engine room of a patrol boat. Cast Members explained how the water tank and props could be used in filming scenes from action films. Using the volunteers from before the guests were shown a special effects demonstration, known as Harbor Attack. One volunteer sat in the engine room and was overcame by a deluge of water (1000 Gallons of Water) coming into the room through a window from two dump tanks. The other three volunteers were standing on the deck when an attack happened. Explosions underwater, simulated torpedo bursts, and fireballs were used to simulate the attack. When filming was finished the footage was put together with previously recorded footage of airplane attacks and dialogue and shown to the guests.

When the demonstration was finished, guests continued into a large prop warehouse. The line moved guests up and down aisles of props used in different major productions, including Marvin's Room, The Santa Clause, Honey, I Shrunk the Kids, Honey, I Blew Up the Kid, Who Framed Roger Rabbit, The Rocketeer, The Chronicles of Narnia: The Lion, the Witch and the Wardrobe, The Great Muppet Caper, and George of the Jungle. Several of the props were tagged with information. At the exit of the building the tram part of the tour began.

=== Tram tour ===
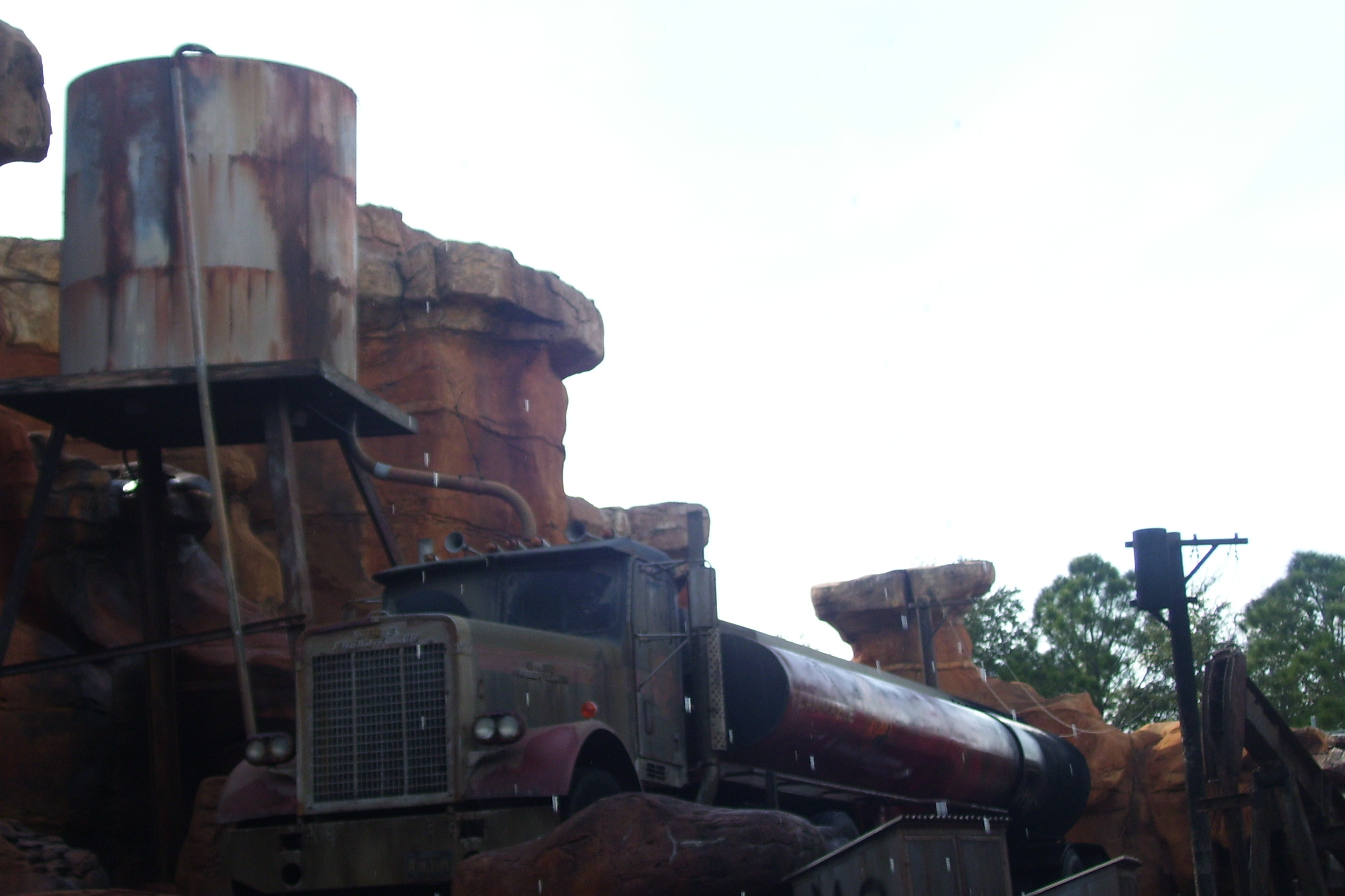
Catastrophe Canyon before the deluge...

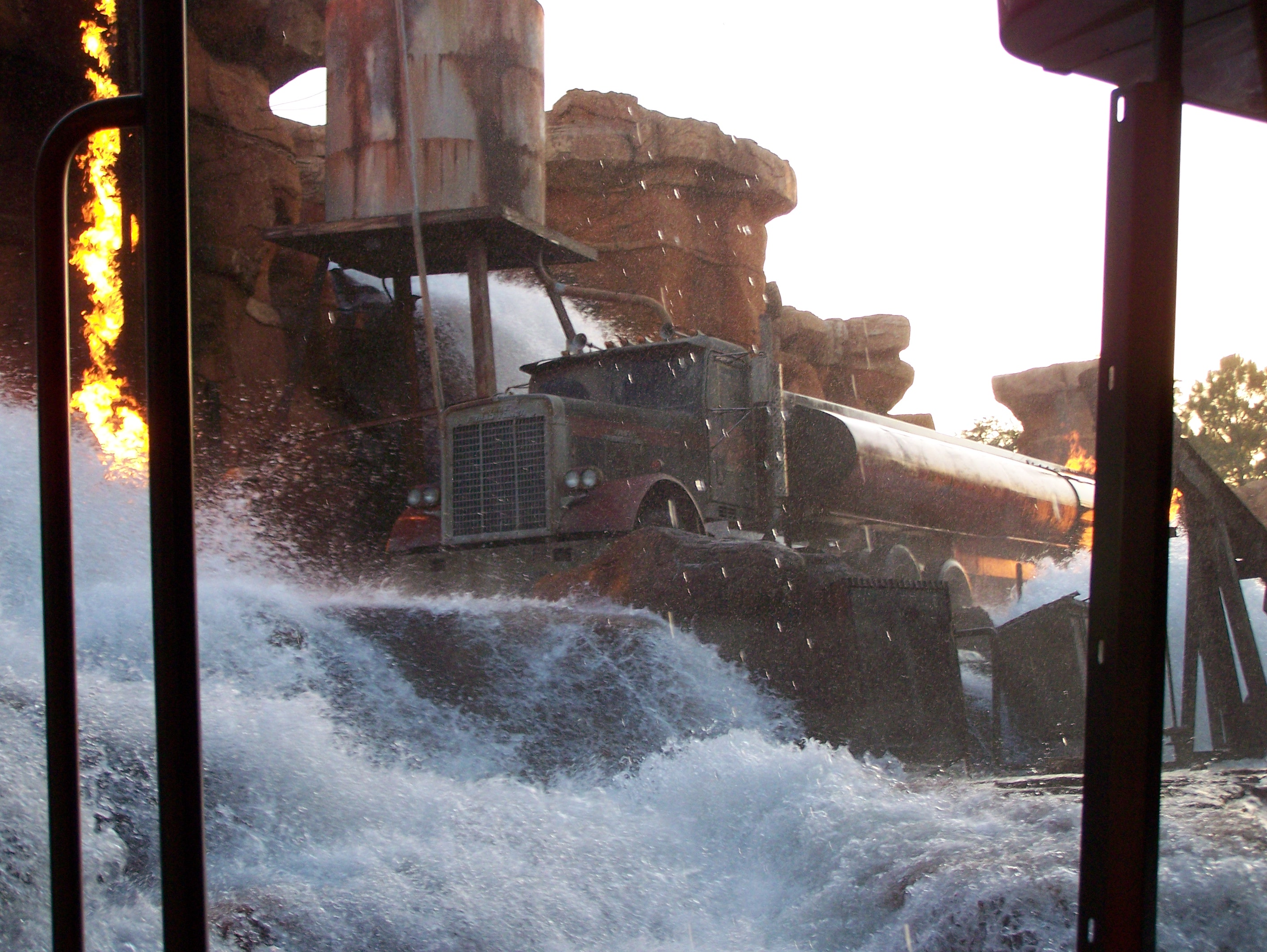
...and during

As guests exited the prop building they boarded onto a tram for the main part of the tour. As the driver brought the tram through different areas, a prerecorded narration explained what was found there and tells the guests facts about it. Guests first traveled past the Earffel Tower, the former icon of the park. The tram ride was the closest that guests could get to the tower in the park. After the tower the tram drove through the costume and materials building, which had a thru-way for the tram and windows for guests to see the costumes and people working. A highlight in the building was the room full of tires used for the Lights, Motors, Action!: Extreme Stunt Show.

When the tram left the building it would bring the guests through an outside area named the boneyard (named after an aircraft boneyard). In the boneyard vehicles featured in many films could be seen. Props included the genuine steamroller used by Judge Doom during the climax of Who Framed Roger Rabbit, ships from the original Star Wars films, the duo motorcycles from Indiana Jones and the Last Crusade, the escape pod from The Hitchhiker's Guide to the Galaxy, cars used in the Herbie the Love Bug films, bone cages from Pirates of the Caribbean: Dead Man's Chest, the Trimaxiom Drone Ship from Flight of the Navigator and boats and other vehicles used in other Disney-produced films.

After leaving the boneyard, guests were told that they would be entering a "live" movie set while the cast was on break. The tram would then move into an area known as Catastrophe Canyon, a rocky area with a fuel truck and water tanks inside of it. While the tram was stopped, filming starts suddenly. An earthquake shakes the tram and telephone poles start moving back and forth, with sparks flying from one of the poles and this causes the fuel truck to catch fire, sending a fire ball into the air. Then a flood of water comes rushing down from the canyon and from above the tram. When the earthquake subsides and the water stops, the set would then begin to reset for the next tram and the host on the tram tells guests how it was done as the tram travels behind the set to show the back of the production.

After exiting the canyon the tram traveled through parts of the boneyard again. Guests would go past the Lights, Motors, Action! Extreme Stunt Show stadium and practice areas. The tram also passed Walt Disney's private airplane, a Grumman Gulfstream I that is now on display at the Palm Springs Air Museum. After passing the plane, the tram pulls in to the exit and unloaded into the AFI Showcase room.

=== Post-ride ===
In order to leave the attraction, guests had to walk through an American Film Institute museum exhibit based on AFI's 50 Greatest Villains. Many of the villains on the list were represented with life-sized figures in display cases, with drawings and pictures of them from their films. The entire list was presented with pictures of all of the villains on a wall in the building. While guests on the Backlot Tour had to go through the exhibit to exit, it was not necessary to go on the tour to see the exhibit, as it was possible to enter it through the exit. The exhibit and store were closed in August 2014, a month prior to the attraction's closure.

== See also ==
- Studio Tram Tour: Behind the Magic (former counterpart tram tour at Disney Adventure World, Disneyland Paris)
