= Honey, I Shrunk the Kids (disambiguation) =

Honey, I Shrunk the Kids is the original 1989 American film. It may also refer to:

- Honey, I Shrunk the Kids (franchise)
- Honey, I Shrunk the Kids: The TV Show, a 1997 spin-off television series
- Honey, I Shrunk the Kids: Movie Set Adventure, a playground located at Disney's Hollywood Studios (Orlando, Florida)
