= Lights, Motors, Action!: Extreme Stunt Show =

Defunct stunt show

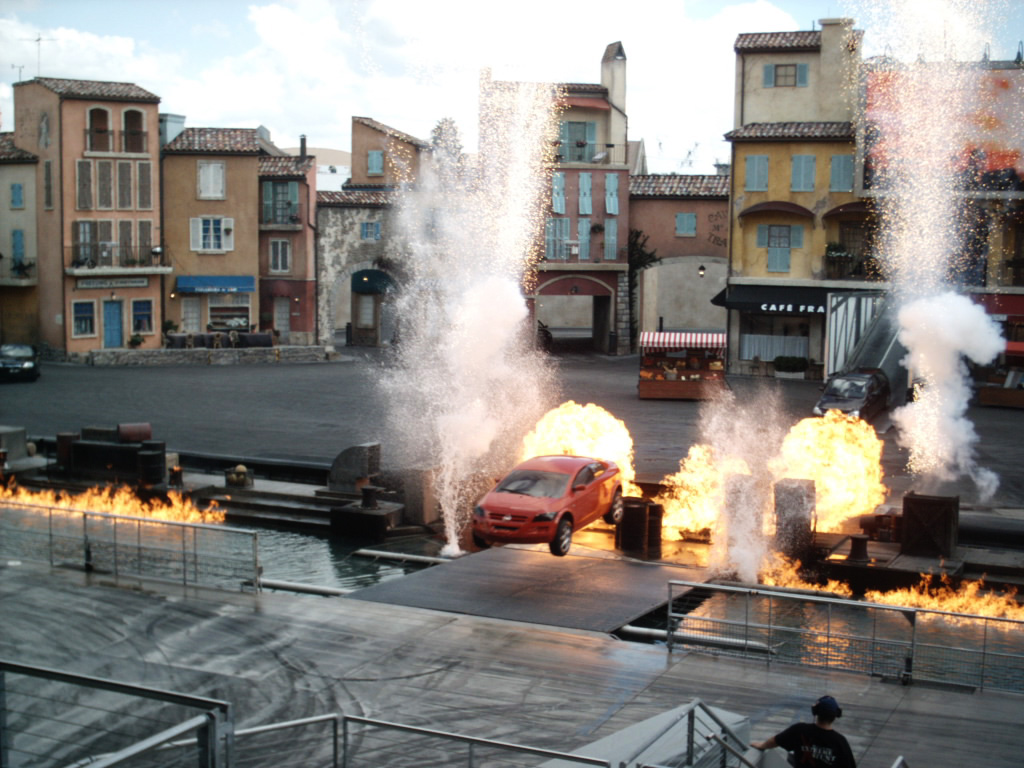

Disney Adventure World
- Name: Moteurs... Action!: Stunt Show Spectacular
- Area: Backlot
- Coordinates: 48.865°N 2.778°E
- Status: Closed
- Opening date: March 16, 2002
- Closing date: March 13, 2020
- Replaced by: Alice & The Queen of Hearts: Back to Wonderland (Production Courtyard; 2024) (World Premiere Plaza; 2025)

Disney's Hollywood Studios
- Name: Lights, Motors... Action! Stunt Show Spectacular
- Area: Streets of America
- Coordinates: 28.3538°N 81.5615°W
- Status: Closed
- Opening date: May 5, 2005
- Closing date: April 2, 2016
- Replaced: Studio Backlot Tour - Residential Street
- Replaced by: Millennium Falcon – Smugglers Run (Star Wars: Galaxy's Edge)

Ride statistics
- Attraction type: Stunt show
- Designer: Walt Disney Imagineering; Walt Disney Creative Entertainment
- Site area: 53,949 m^{2} (580,700 sq ft)
- Audience capacity: 5000 per show
- Duration: 38 minutes
- Wheelchair accessible
- Assistive listening available

The Lights, Motors, Action!: Extreme Stunt Show (sometimes referred to as Moteurs... Action!: Stunt Show Spectacular), was a stunt show performed at Disney Adventure World in Disneyland Paris and at Disney's Hollywood Studios theme park in Lake Buena Vista, Florida. The show was designed to be and look like a movie set, and the show is dedicated to show the process of how action movies are created.

Revolving around a series of energetic stunts featuring automobiles, the show runs for just under 40 minutes, and includes scenes of car-based action, pyrotechnics, jet ski chases, and physical stuntwork. The cars are followed by cameras, and film, both shot during the show and pre-recorded, is shown to the audience on a billboard television screen.

== History ==
The Moteurs... Action! version of the show originally opened in time with the premiere of Walt Disney Studios Park on March 16, 2002, which coincided with the 10th anniversary of the Disneyland Paris resort. The Lights, Motors, Action! version of the show debuted three years later at Disney's Hollywood Studios along with Soarin' at Epcot during the Happiest Celebration on Earth festival, in which each of the four Walt Disney World theme parks opened a new attraction that have been copied from another Disney resort. The entire show has now been demolished.

Herbie, the Volkswagen from The Love Bug, previously made an appearance in an intermission in the middle of the show, but was replaced by Lightning McQueen from Cars in 2011. The show at Walt Disney Studios Park was located in the Backlot area next to Rock 'n' Roller Coaster. Once Armageddon – Les Effets Speciaux closed down in early 2019, the entrance was rerouted to the Production Courtyard area, as its surrounding area was being renovated into Avengers Campus. The show arena has scenery inspired by Villefranche-sur-Mer; a Mediterranean village in the south of France. The arena's construction at Disney's Hollywood Studios forced the Studio Tram Tour: Behind the Magic at the theme park to be almost halved in length, as the arena was built inside locations used by the backlot tour. Construction of the Hollywood Studios location began in the summer of 2003.

The show was previously sponsored at Walt Disney Studios Park by General Motors through its Opel division and at Disney's Hollywood Studios by Koch Industries through its Brawny division. On January 15, 2016, Disney announced that the Hollywood Studios location would officially retire on April 3 for the construction of Star Wars: Galaxy's Edge and Toy Story Land. In addition to the stunt show, Honey, I Shrunk the Kids: Movie Set Adventure and most of the Streets of America section would also close down to make room for these two new themed areas. The Paris version of the show closed on March 13, 2020; nearly 18 years after it initially opened; the closure was expected as part of the Walt Disney Studios park expansion, but the closure date was moved up owing to the COVID-19 pandemic in France, until it announced that was replaced by a new stunt shows, Alice and the Queen of Hearts: Back to Wonderland, and a new outdoor area called Theater of the Stars, which will premiere on May 25, 2024, and it will run until September 29, 2024, and located behind Avengers Campus.

== Summary ==
=== Queue ===
When the show is not running and when the audience is exiting or entering the stadium, queue music is played, while the billboard television screen shows trivia questions about films and movies with car chases and destruction in them.

=== Pre-show ===
The pre-show features clips of action scenes involving car chases from various action thriller films including The Rock (1996), Con Air (1997), Enemy of the State (1998), Gone in 60 Seconds (2000), Speed (1994), and Ronin (1998). The Disney's Hollywood Studios location does not include the clips from the latter two films.

=== Show ===
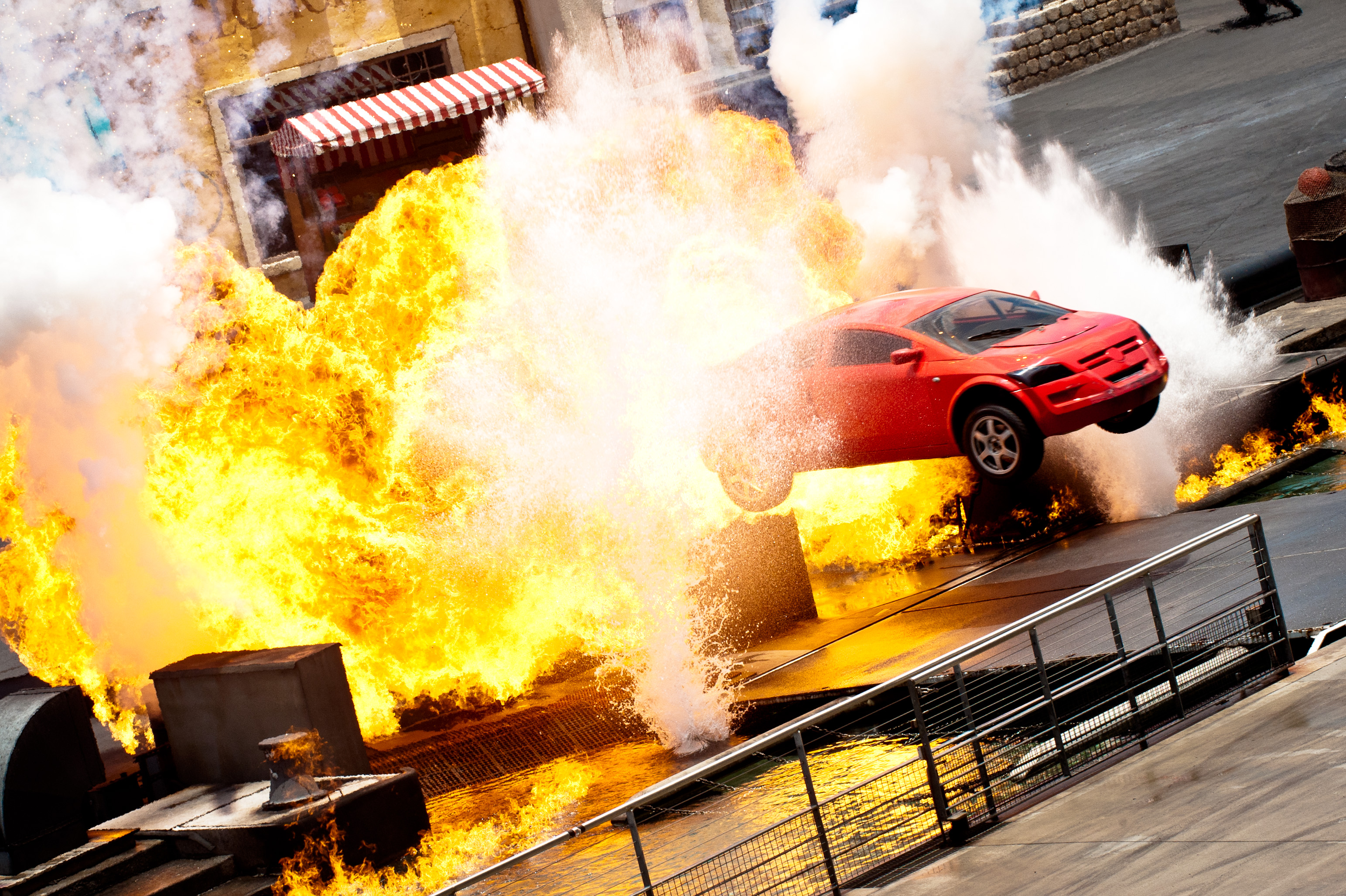
The show's finale

The main show starts off with the "Ballet Chase," featuring a red "hero car" being chased by five black pursuit cars. This scene ends with the hero car jumping backwards off of a ramp, and the fifth pursuit car being blown in half.

While the next scene is being set up, it is explained how they film the action. They also introduce the hero car driver, and explain how a second hero car, designed so that the driver faces out the back, was used for the backwards jump.

The next scene, the "Blockade Chase," is set in a marketplace, with the car chase taking place around obstacles such as trucks and market stalls. The scene ends with the hero car driving up the back of a truck bed, over a second truck, and landing on an airbag.

As the third scene is being set up, a driverless hero car is shown, and an audience volunteer is brought down to drive it via remote control. After the volunteer appears to lose control of the vehicle, it is revealed that the car actually does have a driver, who is hidden on the far side of the vehicle out of sight of the audience.

The fourth sequence, the "Motorcycle Chase," begins with the hero running across the stage while being shot at by two villains on black bikes. He runs into a motorcycle shop and commandeers a blue bike, then is chased by the two pursuit motorcycles and three cars. The hero later switches to a jet ski, and eventually faces his pursuers on foot. This scene features a stuntman falling thirty feet from a building into an airbag and a florist driving a flower delivery van, as well as the rider of one of the pursuit motorcycles catching on fire.

Immediately before the "Motorcycle Chase" sequence began during the show's first few years at Walt Disney Studios Park, two separate groups of selected audience members on each side of the stage would start behind the market stalls, run across the stage while acting scared and panicked as made to look like they were attacked by the villains, and then take cover by the village facade.

As the final scene is set up, they explain the specially treated clothing that allowed the final rider to be safely set on fire.

The final scene begins with footage being shown on the large video screen of the previous stunt sequences edited into a finished film. As the film on the screen reaches its climax, fire ignites in the canal area at the front of the stage. The hero car appears on stage, being chased by a black pursuit car, and heads behind one of the buildings. A few seconds later, the hero car reenters from the second story of the building, down the bed of a truck parked in front of the building, and jumps a ramp across the canal directly towards the audience. Fireworks and explosions are set off as the car exits through a tunnel under the grandstands.

Afterward, a curtain call of all of the vehicles used in the movie shoot is shown, with the black pursuit cars and motorcycles, and the three red hero cars and the blue motorcycle.

== Vehicles ==
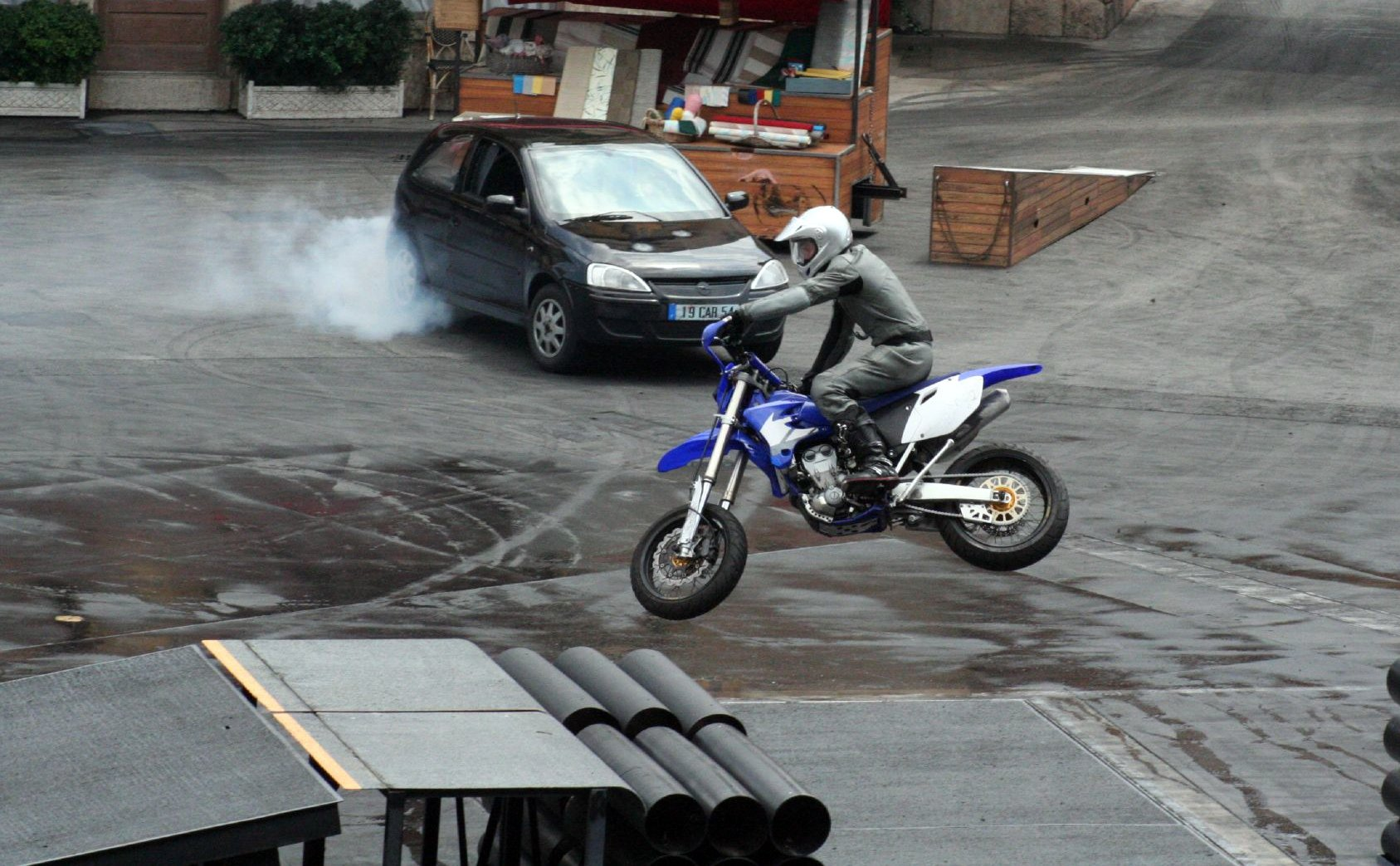
A motorcycle performing a jump.

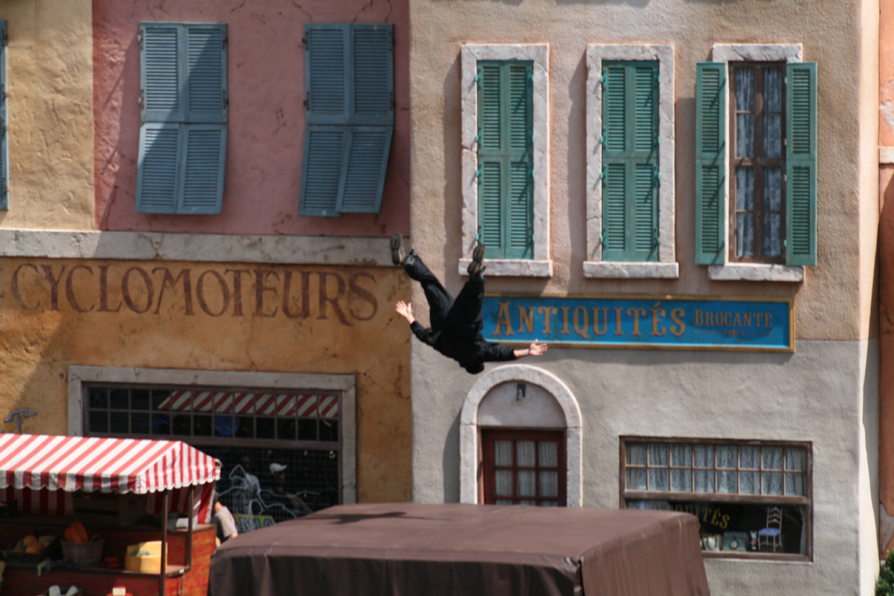
Stunt man falling.

The show maintained a fleet of more than 40 vehicles. The primary "hero" car, which the action revolves around, was custom-built for the show, while the pursuit cars were designed to resemble Opel Corsas. The hero cars were all painted red while the pursuit cars were painted black, to easily allow guests to tell the difference between them.

The show included multiple red "hero" cars. One had the bodyshell oriented backwards to allow the driver to appear to be driving in reverse; the other had a seat and steering wheel bolted onto the side of the car away from the audience, so that the car appeared to be driving without anyone inside.

One of the black "pursuit" cars was cut in half behind the front doors, so that it appeared to explode during a scene in the show.

All the cars were reinforced with roll cages for driver safety and were powered by Suzuki Hayabusa 1300 cc 175 horsepower (130 kW) motorcycle engines mounted directly behind the driver's seat. The cars' transmissions had four sequential forward and reverse gears, allowing them to be driven backwards at high speed.

The cars had a bump shift for easier gear shifting: the driver bumped the shifter forward to go up a gear, and back to go back a gear. In order to reverse, the driver twisted the top of the shifter and bumped it forwards or backwards. The handbrake automatically released when the driver let go.

The show cars weighed 1,322 pounds (600 kg), and were rear-wheel drive to allow the cars to drift. The drivers wore fireproof nomex suits, as well as a cool shirt to keep them cool – a cooling system in the front of the cars pumped cold water through the shirt.

The show also featured jet skis on the small canal at the front of the theater, and Yamaha motorcycles which maneuvered around the cars. The Paris location initially had jet skis in its early days, but they were banned shortly before its grand opening due to safety concerns.
