= Scott Trowbridge =

American entertainment creator (born 1966)

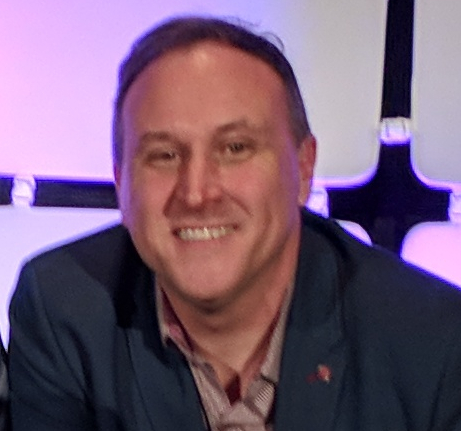
- Trowbridge after the "Legends: Adapting IPs for Parks and Attractions. What Works, What Does Not" panel at IAAPA IAE 2017
- Born: 1966 (age 59–60)
- Education: USC School of Cinematic Arts, 1988
- Occupation: Theme park designer
- Employer: Walt Disney Imagineering

Scott Trowbridge is an American entertainment creator currently serving as Portfolio Creative Executive for Walt Disney Imagineering, the design and production division for Disney Parks, Experiences and Products; a division of the Walt Disney Company. Before Disney, Trowbridge was active in film and theatre production, and held leadership roles within Universal Creative, the design and development arm of Universal Parks and Resorts. In 2007, Trowbridge left Universal to join Walt Disney Imagineering to lead Disney's Research & Development division and Blue Sky Creative Studio. In 2015, he started a new studio at Imagineering dedicated to developing Lucasfilm and Star Wars projects.

== Early life ==
Trowbridge grew up in the suburbs of St. Louis, Missouri where he attended Lindbergh High School. In 2016, Lindbergh awarded a Distinguished Alumni Award to Trowbridge. After Lindbergh, Trowbridge attended USC's top-rated School of Cinematic Arts.

== Career ==
=== Live theatre ===
Before developing theme parks and location based entertainment, Trowbridge produced live theatre productions. His first Disney connection may have come while producing "Tiger Lady," a period drama that starred Beauty and the Beast star Paige O'Hara with set designs by Joe Cashman, with whom he would later reunite at Disney's Imagineering.

Trowbridge also worked with Los Angeles' famous Groundlings improvisational comedy troupe and school.

=== Universal Studios ===
In the early '90s, Trowbridge joined Universal Creative and has often been associated with technically challenging and innovative projects and new technologies. When describing The Amazing Adventures of Spider-Man to Wired Magazine before it opened in 1999, Trowbridge said about the blend of art and technology, "If it works, it'll be like a good magic trick." Often cited as one of the best theme park rides in the world, Trowbridge led the Spider-Man creative team and the attraction has since won many awards including winning Amusement Today's Golden Ticket Award for Best Dark Ride for twelve consecutive years from 1999 to 2010. (In 2011, the top spot went to another Trowbridge project, Harry Potter and the Forbidden Journey.)

Trowbridge continued to lead project teams on new attractions like Universal's Revenge of the Mummy which innovated the combination of traditional dark ride techniques with roller-coaster thrills. At a news conference in New York in February 2004, Trowbridge told the New York Times, "Traditionally, theme park attractions have had to make a choice: roller coaster thrill ride or an immersive dark ride," continuing "We have been striving to find a way to put together the best of both worlds in one experience." Trowbridge added, ''That takes advances in technology we've been working on for a long time.''

In May 2007, Universal Studios and Warner Brothers confirmed the rumors Universal was working on a Harry Potter-based theme park project. Characterized as "a theme park within a theme park," The Wizarding World of Harry Potter became one of the most anticipated theme park additions ever. Trowbridge made the announcement in a live webcast from Dumbledore's office set at Leavesden Studios alongside Stuart Craig, the Production Designer of the Potter films. Trowbridge introduced Craig's involvement in the project and reassured Potter fans that "We're really going to the people who know this world best to ensure that level of authenticity." The Wizarding World of Harry Potter, and its ground-breaking attraction, Harry Potter and the Forbidden Journey, opened at Universal Orlando Resort on June 18, 2010; at Universal Studios Japan on July 15, 2014; and at Universal Studios Hollywood on April 7, 2016.

=== Walt Disney Imagineering ===
In October 2007, the Orlando Sentinel newspaper reported that Trowbridge was leaving Universal to join Disney. Industry experts speculated that with the Wizarding World creative planning already complete, Disney might be able to offer more challenging projects as the vice president for creative research and development. Trowbridge is not known to have commented on the reasons behind the change.

Trowbridge joined Walt Disney Imagineering overseeing its technology R&D division, and, its Blue Sky Creative Studio. Trowbridge has often advocated for new forms of immersive experience combining artificial characters, more personal experiences and more interactive experiences. In 2015, Trowbridge told The Verge about Disney's elaborate ARG (Alternate Reality Game) that pulled participants into the backstory of the film Tomorrowland. Trowbridge told The Verge, "What we're spending a lot of time making sure we get awesome at are deeply immersive, participatory experiences," and, "More and more, technology is allowing us to do this. I think culture is kind of inviting us to do this, and frankly, I kind of believe there's a changing form of narrative." Trowbridge is also active in developing technologies related to aviation and Unmanned Aerial Vehicles. Trowbridge invented many patents around the use of Unmanned Aerial Vehicles, or drones In 2012, Disney unveiled a physical flying fire-breathing dragon, which Trowbridge worked on, as part of the opening of New Fantasyland at Walt Disney World's Magic Kingdom.

With Disney's 2012 acquisition of Lucasfilm, speculation about Star Wars-themed attractions grew. And in 2014, Disney started a new Studio at Imagineering dedicated to developing Lucasfilm and Star Wars projects with Trowbridge leading the group. While speculation about new Disney theme parks and attractions continued, on August 15, 2015, Disney CEO, Bob Iger announced what had been long anticipated, that Disney would build two Star Wars themed lands, at both Disneyland and at Disney's Hollywood Studios. In July 2017, Disney announced that these new lands would be called, Star Wars: Galaxy's Edge.

During the 2018 Disney Parks Christmas Day Parade television special, Iger introduced a video teaser showing the most finished work to date. Showcasing footage from inside the actual attractions, Trowbridge, along with Carrie Beck, a Lucasfilm story executive, described the attractions and the overall land which opened to the public in 2019.
