= Star Wars: Millennium Falcon – Smugglers Run =

Ride at Star Wars: Galaxy's Edge

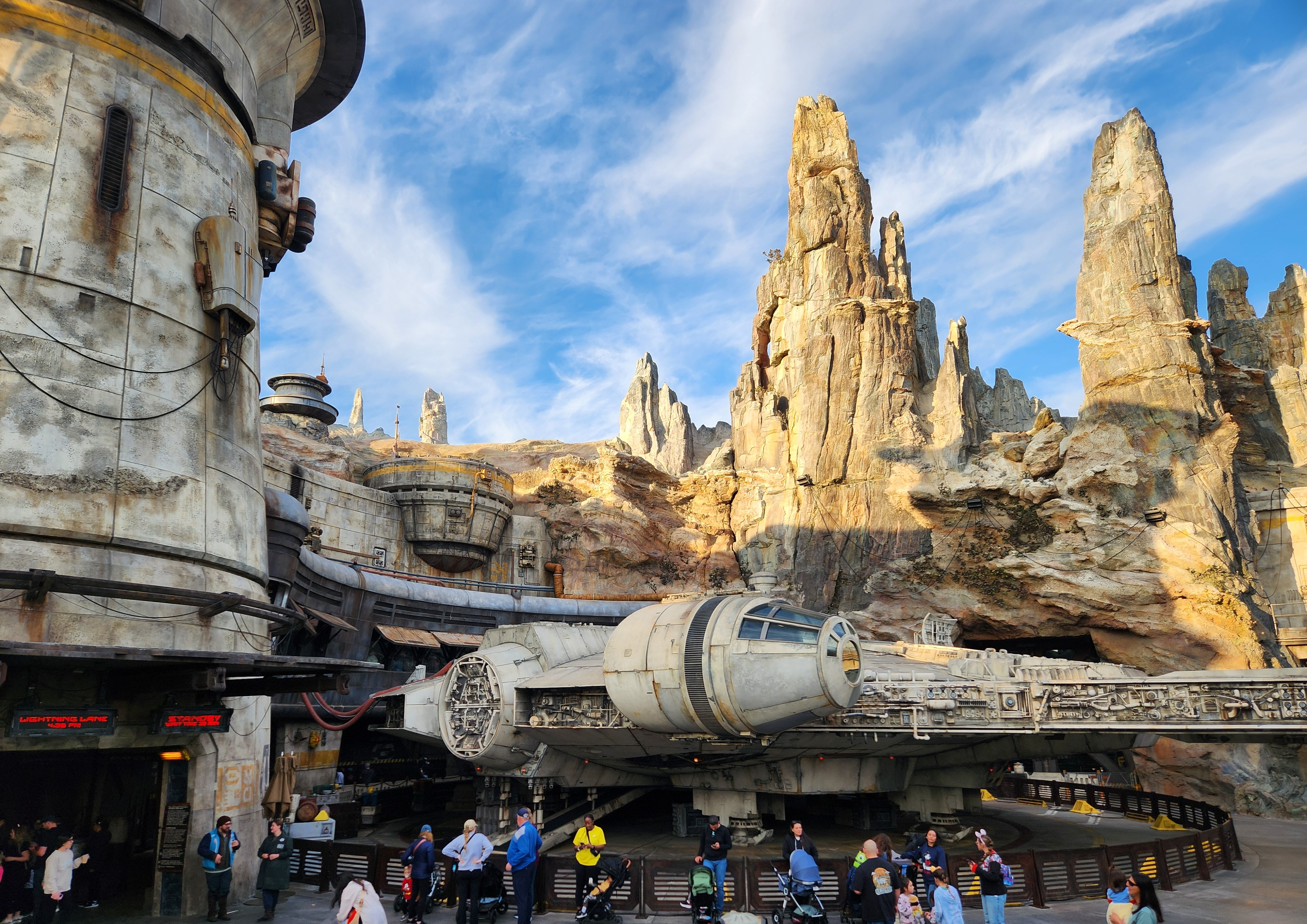
- The entrance to the attraction at Galaxy's Edge in Disneyland

Disneyland
- Area: Star Wars: Galaxy's Edge
- Coordinates: 33.8141725°N 117.9218758°W
- Status: Operating
- Opening date: May 31, 2019

Disney's Hollywood Studios
- Area: Star Wars: Galaxy's Edge
- Status: Operating
- Opening date: August 29, 2019
- Replaced: Lights, Motors, Action!: Extreme Stunt Show (Streets of America)

Ride statistics
- Theme: Millennium Falcon (Star Wars)
- Riders per vehicle: 6
- Rows: 3
- Riders per row: 2 (2 pilots, 2 gunners, 2 engineers)
- Height restriction: 38 in (97 cm)
- Ride host: Hondo Ohnaka (voiced by Jim Cummings)
- Lightning Lane Available
- Single rider line available
- Must transfer from wheelchair

Star Wars: Millennium Falcon – Smugglers Run is a motion simulator attraction, based on the Star Wars film series created by George Lucas. Located in Star Wars: Galaxy's Edge, the attraction opened on May 31, 2019, in Disneyland, and opened on August 29, 2019, in Disney's Hollywood Studios.

Riders are seated in a 6-passenger motion simulator, themed after the Millennium Falcon. Guests go on an interactive "smuggling mission" with each guest on the attraction being assigned a different crew role. From 2019 until 2026, the story was set between the films The Last Jedi (2017) and The Rise of Skywalker (2019). After a 2026 refurbishment, the attraction is now set around the events of The Mandalorian And Grogu (2026) and features the titular lead characters.

== History ==
At the Disney D23 Expo in 2015, Disney first announced the creation of a Star Wars-themed land coming to Disneyland and Disney's Hollywood Studios. In 2017, Disney announced that the new Star Wars-themed land would be called Star Wars: Galaxy's Edge and it would hold two new attractions. Millennium Falcon – Smugglers Run was not officially announced until 2018.

Star Wars: Galaxy's Edge and Millennium Falcon – Smugglers Run first opened at Disneyland on May 31, 2019, and the second opened at Disney's Hollywood Studios on August 29, 2019.

Star Wars: Millennium Falcon – Smugglers Run had wait times ranging from 30 to 60 minutes upon opening day. The ride benefited from having four slowly rotating attraction turntables. Each turntable had multiple Millennium Falcon cockpits. That meant that the downtime was registered if all four turntables of the flight simulator failed simultaneously.

In August 2024, it was announced that a new story with the Mandalorian and Grogu would be added to the ride. In March 2025, it was announced that the new version would debut on May 22, 2026, at Disneyland and Disney's Hollywood Studios, which is the same day that the film The Mandalorian and Grogu was released in theaters. During Star Wars Celebration in April 2025, it was announced the update would feature a choose-your-own-adventure path.

== Attraction ==
=== Queue ===
Smugglers Run is located in the center of Black Spire Outpost at the entrance to Ohnaka Transport Solutions. The queue begins outside, wrapping around behind a life-size Millennium Falcon parked outside. The queue continues through an engine room/mechanic shop which then leads to the command center preshow where Audio-Animatronics figures of Hondo Ohnaka and his astromech droid R5-P8 explain what the mission is about. If the animatronic of Hondo is nonfunctional, Hondo will instead appear on the left-hand television screen (portrayed by a live-action actor) and acknowledge and apologize about the remote communication before explaining the mission. Both characters first appeared in Star Wars: The Clone Wars; as in the series, Hondo is voiced by Jim Cummings. Chewbacca makes an appearance in the preshow as well, communicating from a television screen.

Each guest can have one of three jobs—pilot, gunner, or engineer. Guests are grouped into six riders (two of each job) and given a color which is then called when ready to board. While riders wait for their color to be called, they get to explore the inside of the Millennium Falcon. Once their group color is called, riders walk down the corridors of the Millennium Falcon to the flight deck where the ride begins.

=== Original ride experience (2019–2026) ===
Guests are seated into the cockpit of the Millennium Falcon. The mission, led by Hondo and R5-P8, is to travel to Corellia to steal shipments of coaxium from a First Order train. The two pilots sit in the front row–the left side moves the ship left and right, and the right side moves the ship up and down. The next row holds the gunners who press buttons to shoot down enemies and obstacles in the way. The back row seats the two engineers who work to repair the ship during the flight. If less than six guests are riding, the missing positions are controlled automatically.

Similar to Epcot's Mission: SPACE, Smugglers Run is an interactive ride, with every guest having a role in the mission. How well each rider performs determines the success of the mission. Furthermore, any "damage" inflicted to the ship during the run will affect the lighting conditions in the exit corridor.

The ride is made up of four turntables each with seven simulators that rotate approximately every 45 seconds. If the ride is backed up, guests may end up in an asteroid field or receive longer messages from Hondo while they wait for their turn to exit.

There was a hidden "Chewie Mode" that guests could activate before the ride began. This mode replaced the usual narration of Hondo with Chewbacca.

The mission was inspired by settings from the 2018 film Solo: A Star Wars Story.

=== Current ride experience (2026) ===
Once in the cockpit of the Millennium Falcon, riders travel to Tatooine, per Hondo's instructions, to meet up with the Mandalorian and Grogu. After a brief practice run on collecting crates, they pursue three bounties, but are only able to go after one. One of the engineers deploys homing beacons to each of the bounties, while the other engineer chooses one of three destinations to go to; Bespin, Coruscant, or Endor. At each of these destinations, riders, along with the Mandalorian and Grogu, face various obstacles as the Mandalorian captures a bounty and riders have the opportunity to collect crates for Hondo. This version features a secret "Grogu Mode" that can be activated by riders in the Gunner position instead of the entire crew.

== See also ==
- Star Tours – The Adventures Continue
- Star Wars: Rise of the Resistance
