= Honey, I Shrunk the Kids: Movie Set Adventure =

Defunct attraction at Disney's Hollywood Studios

Coordinates: 28°21′18.8″N 81°33′36.93″W

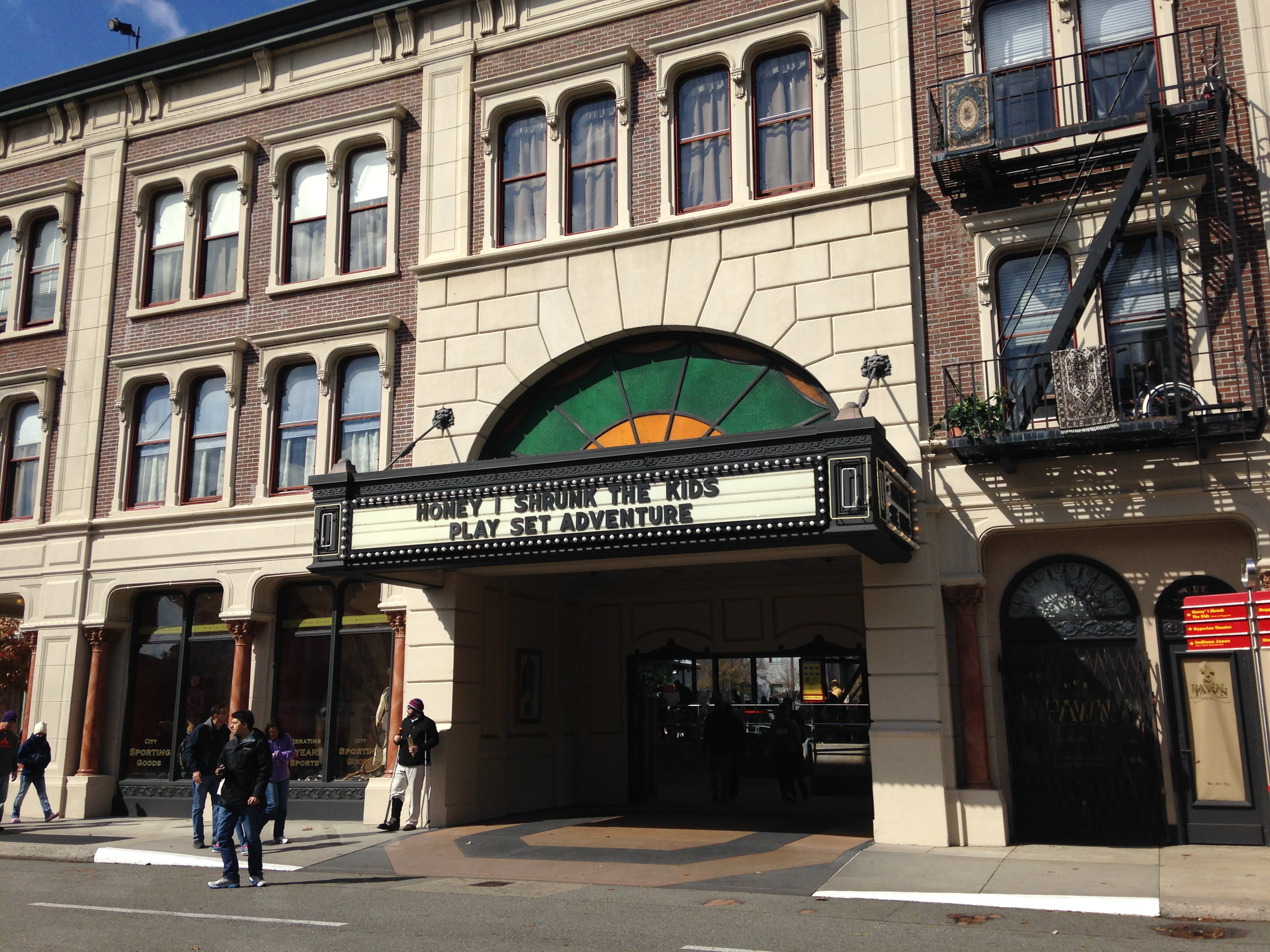

Disney's Hollywood Studios
- Area: Streets of America
- Status: Removed
- Opening date: December 17, 1990
- Closing date: April 2, 2016
- Replaced by: Star Wars: Galaxy's Edge

Ride statistics
- Attraction type: Playground
- Designer: Walt Disney Imagineering
- Theme: Honey, I Shrunk the Kids
- Wheelchair accessible

Honey, I Shrunk the Kids: Movie Set Adventure was a playground at Disney's Hollywood Studios at Walt Disney World Resort in Florida. It was located in the Streets of America area and was based on Disney's 1989 film, Honey, I Shrunk the Kids. The playground, which opened a year and a half after the film, featured 30-foot-tall (9.1 m) blades of grass, and was themed as a movie set for the giant backyard scenes from the film. Children could roam through the playground, exploring giant ants and a giant dog nose.

On January 15, 2016, Disney's Hollywood Studios announced that the Streets of America section, Honey, I Shrunk the Kids: Movie Set Adventure and Lights, Motors, Action!: Extreme Stunt Show would be permanently closed. They operated for the final time on April 2, 2016, and were all demolished to make room for the construction of Star Wars: Galaxy's Edge on the same site.

== Overview ==
The playground featured large movie props and structures inspired by the Disney film Honey, I Shrunk the Kids. The soft play surface used for dirt and other objects were the same material used in the Boneyard Playground in the DinoLand USA section at Disney's Animal Kingdom. The playground featured scenes from the movie but also included areas that were not explored in the film. They included:

- Large ants
- Explorable anthills
- A spider web/maze with climbing ropes
- A slide made to look like a canister of Kodak film
- A giant dog nose that sprayed mist
- 52-foot-long (16 m) leaking water hose that sprayed
- 40-foot-tall (12 m) bumblebees
- Jumbo plant-root mazes
- Oatmeal Creme Pie
- Giant pieces of Cheerios
- Play-Doh can
