= Star Wars: Rise of the Resistance =

Dark ride at Star Wars: Galaxy's Edge

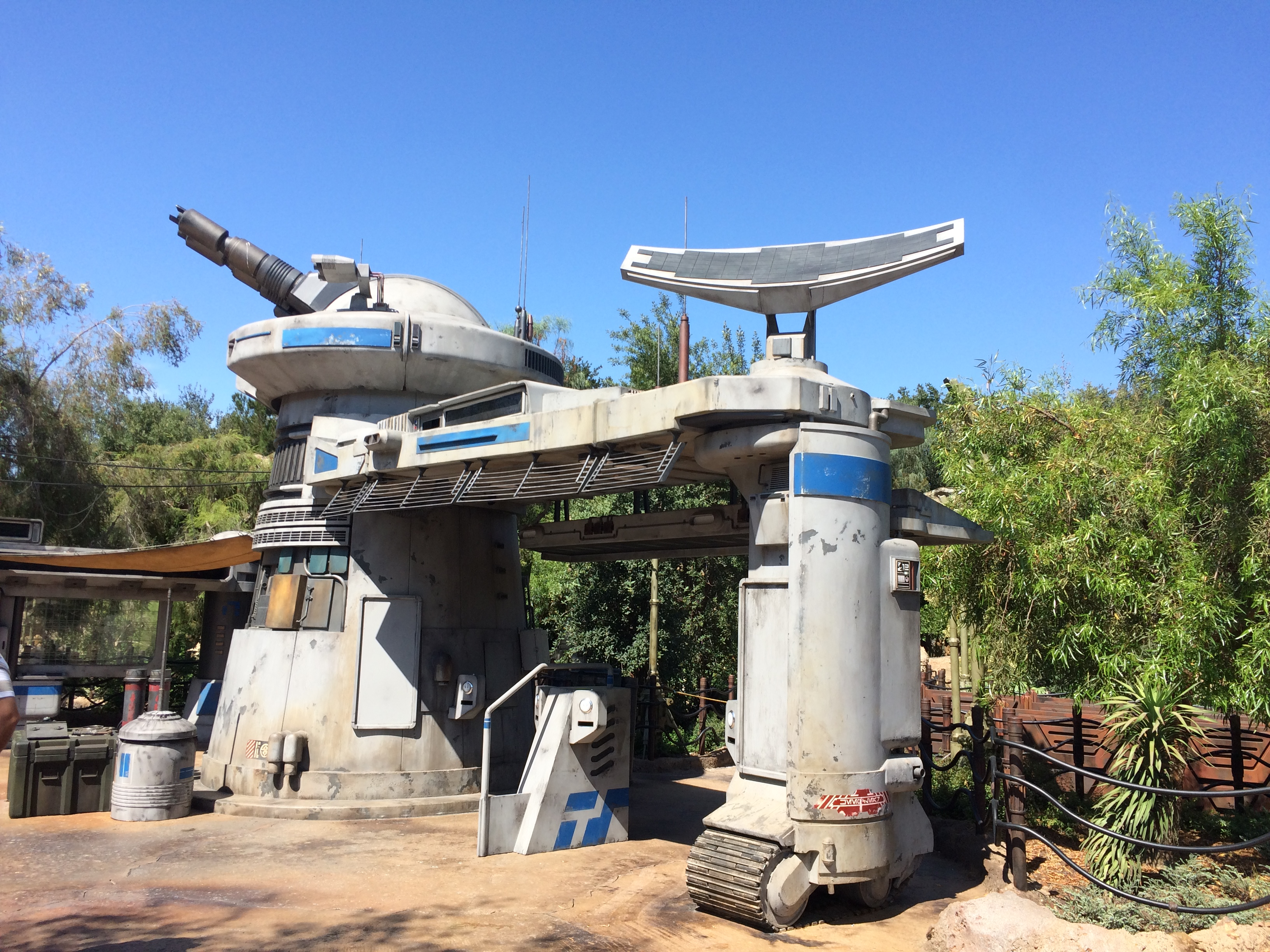
- Entrance to the Attraction at Disneyland

Disney's Hollywood Studios
- Area: Star Wars: Galaxy's Edge
- Status: Operating
- Soft opening date: December 3, 2019
- Opening date: December 5, 2019

Disneyland
- Area: Star Wars: Galaxy's Edge
- Status: Operating
- Opening date: January 17, 2020

Ride statistics
- Attraction type: Motion simulator / trackless dark ride
- Designer: Walt Disney Imagineering
- Model: Custom
- Theme: Star Wars
- Music: John Williams
- Vehicle type: First Order fleet transport
- Riders per vehicle: 8
- Rows: 2
- Riders per row: 4
- Duration: 18 minutes
- Height restriction: 40 in (102 cm)
- Audio-Animatronics: 65
- Lightning Lane Single Pass Available
- Must transfer from wheelchair

Star Wars: Rise of the Resistance is a theme park attraction in the Star Wars: Galaxy's Edge lands at both Disneyland and Disney's Hollywood Studios. Set in the timeline of the Star Wars sequel trilogy produced after Disney's 2012 purchase of Lucasfilm, the attraction is centered on a battle between the authoritarian First Order and the galactic Resistance.

Unlike most standalone rides, Star Wars: Rise of the Resistance is a multi-modal, multi-phase attraction that includes multiple ride systems and experiences, including multiple walkthroughs, motion simulators, an LPS-powered trackless dark ride, and a concealed drop tower, all in conjunction with Audio-Animatronics, practical sets, projection mapping and screen-based media.

As a result, Rise of the Resistance is regarded as one of the most complex and advanced attractions designed by Walt Disney Imagineering. Whereas the retired term E-Ticket is still used to refer to the highest caliber headlining rides at Disney Parks, Star Wars: Rise of the Resistance has popularly been given the designation of an "ultra-E-Ticket" or "U-Ticket" experience, indicating its exceptional scale, ambition, and immersion.

== History ==
Announced alongside the land's official announcement at the 2015 D23 Expo in Anaheim, the attraction was originally described as guests "being placed in the middle of a climactic battle between the First Order and the Resistance". The project's code name during its development phase was "Alcatraz," alluding to the former island prison in San Francisco Bay in relation to the ride's "prison break" plot. On November 17, 2018 at a Destination D event, the attraction's name was announced as Star Wars: Rise of the Resistance.

Film actors Daisy Ridley, Oscar Isaac, John Boyega, Adam Driver, Domhnall Gleeson, and Kipsang Rotich reprised their roles in the attraction as Rey, Poe Dameron, Finn, Kylo Ren, General Hux, and the voice of Nien Nunb, respectively. James Arnold Taylor provided the voice of the original character, Lieutenant Bek. Industrial Light & Magic created the CGI sequences for the attraction.

The construction of the attraction posed unprecedented technical challenges. The ride contains 65 Audio-Animatronic figures, and the ride building required the largest concrete pour in the history of Disney Parks. More than five million lines of code control the various aspects of the ride. It has been called a "technical masterpiece".

The attraction was originally planned to open with Galaxy's Edge on opening day (August 29, 2019 at Disney's Hollywood Studios; May 31, 2019 at Disneyland Park), but on March 7, 2019, it was announced that Rise of the Resistance would not open alongside the lands, and would open later than the rest of Galaxy's Edge for "phase two". On July 11, 2019, the opening dates for Rise of the Resistance were revealed with Disney's Hollywood Studios' version opening first on December 5, 2019, followed by Disneyland's version opening on January 17, 2020.

A media event for the attraction at Disney's Hollywood Studios was held from December 3–4, 2019 in which guests attending the event were able to experience the attraction. The version of the ride at Disney's Hollywood Studios opened the next day. Disneyland's version opened as scheduled on January 17, 2020.

== Attraction ==
=== Story ===
In keeping with the setting of Star Wars: Galaxy's Edge, Rise of the Resistance is set on a single, repeating day in the "in-universe" year 34 ABY (set between The Last Jedi and The Rise of Skywalker). Following the Battle of Crait, the last vestiges of the Resistance have retreated to the planet Batuu – once a thriving trader's port on the edge of Wild Space, long-since bypassed by hyperspace travel. There, the regrouping Resistance has set up a hastily-constructed makeshift base in the wilderness outside of Black Spire Outpost, repurposing ancient tunnels once home to an unseen civilization.

Defected Stormtrooper and Resistance loyalist Finn has infiltrated the Finalizer – the First Order Star Destroyer belonging to Kylo Ren – and has learned that Ren is aware of the Resistance's hideout on Batuu and plans to occupy the planet to ferret out the Resistance forces. With word of the encroaching threat shared back to the Batuuan Resistance faction, the Resistance has made the decision to evacuate the planet and meet on the mid-rim planet Pacara where General Leia Organa plans to regroup and stage a final stand against the First Order.

=== Pre-ride experience ===
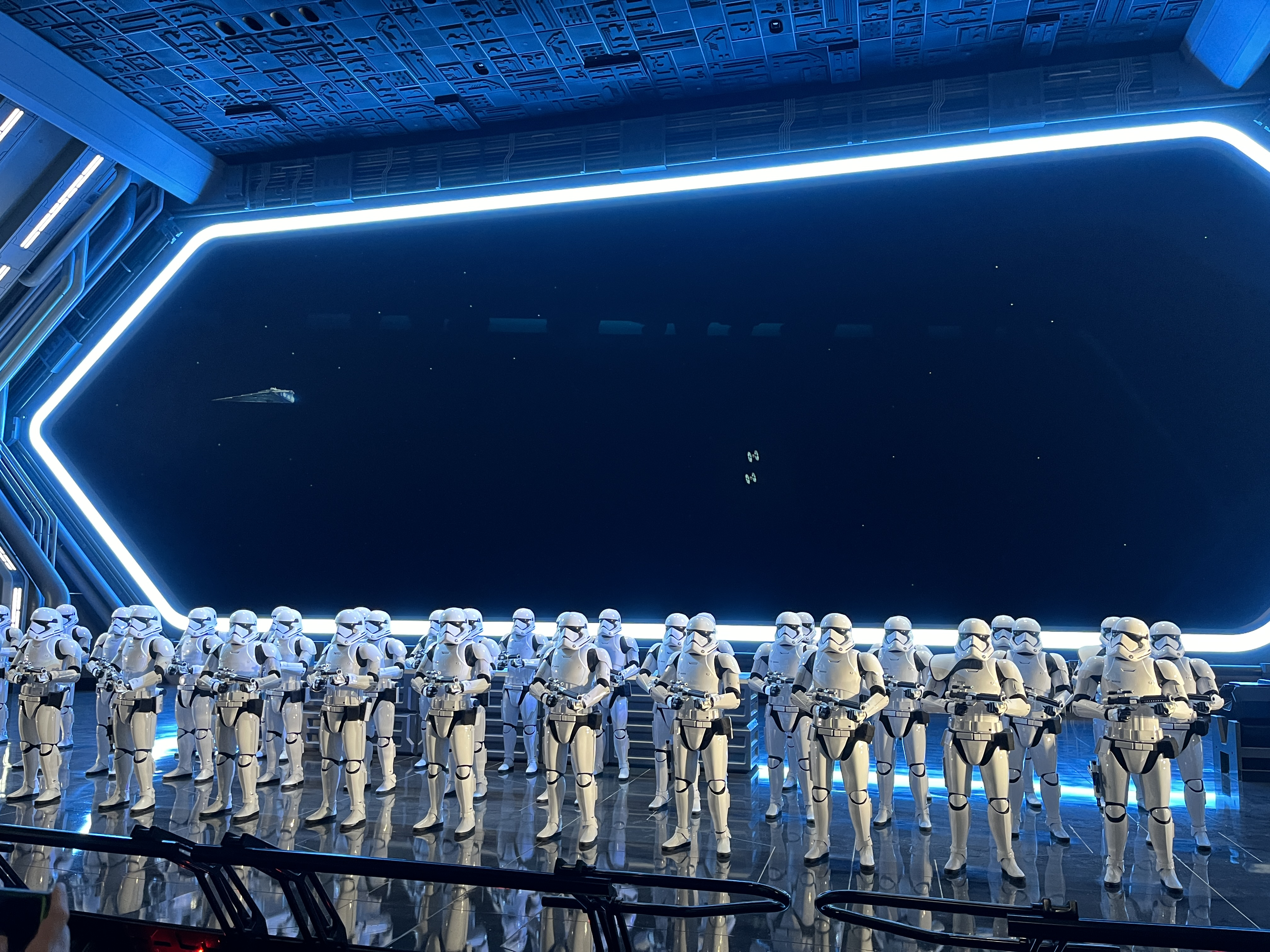
Stormtrooper Hangar at Disneyland.

Guests enter the attraction on the outskirts of Galaxy’s Edge, where a path marked by a turret leads into the cave system that houses a Resistance encampment. Deep within, guests are admitted into a briefing room where BB-8 accepts a holographic transmission from Rey. Rey welcomes the guests as Resistance recruits and announces the plan to depart from Batuu for a rendezvous on Pacara. Guests are directed to an Intersystem Transport Shuttle (ITS) to make the journey.

On board the ITS, guests are met by Audio-Animatronics figures of Lieutenant Bek (a Mon Calamari) and the pilot Nien Nunb, to be shuttled from Batuu to Pacara with Poe Dameron as an X-wing escort. The ITS is a ride system that physically moves guests from one place to another, incorporating projected media and motion simulation. The convoy is attacked by an ambush of First Order TIE fighters, preventing the ITS from jumping to lightspeed. Instead, it is caught in a tractor beam and drawn into the hangar of the Finalizer, where guests are escorted out by a First Order officer and directed to "interrogation."

A third "pre-show" experience sees small groups of no more than sixteen guests isolated in a holding cell to await "interrogation." There, Musion projections of Kylo Ren and General Hux threaten to use The Force to extract the location of the secret Pacara base from guests' minds, but are called away to the ship's bridge before they can complete the process. The pre-ride experience ends when Resistance recruits who have snuck aboard the ship use a torch to cut through the cell wall, beginning a rescue mission to return riders to Batuu.

=== Ride experience ===
Recruits board two Prisoner Transport Units (PTUs) parked in the room adjoining the cell. Each is "piloted" by an on-board First Order R-5 unit Droid that has been reprogrammed by the Resistance (as evidenced by orange "eyes") to take guests to the Escape Pod Bay located on the lowest level of the Star Destroyer. Guided by the voice of Lieutenant Bek over the PTU's radio, the vehicle's R-5 units "negotiate" with other PTU robots, avoid a probe Droid, and make way for a set of turbo-lift elevators before unintentionally drawing the attention of Stormtroopers.

With the prisoners' escape now known, the R-5 units dodge blaster fire and escape into a multi-story hangar bay housing First Order AT-AT Walkers. The vehicles take cover on industrial lifts that carry them upward to a second floor of the ride. Separated and scattering from blaster fire, the PTUs arrive at the ship's bridge, where Kylo Ren preternaturally anticipates the arrival of a Resistance armada who's returned to rescue the prisoners and destroy the Finalizer. Alerted to the prisoners' escape, Ren turns to face them decrying, "How brave... but ultimately hopeless." The R-5 units reverse as Ren pursues, dropping from above, lighting his Lightsaber, and walking directly toward the reversing units.

Riders appear to escape on a turbo-lift, but Ren's Lightsaber pierces the ceiling of the elevator as it descends. When the doors open, the R-5 units drive into a hallway where riders view the Resistance's assault on the ship. The R-5 units pilot the PTUs through First Order cannons that block the ride path, advancing strategically as each cannon recoils in the moment after blasting. A Resistance blast badly damages the ship, initiating Finn taking over the Destroyer's communication system to warn any remaining Resistance personnel to evacuate before the ship is compromised.

The path to the ship's Escape Pods is sealed off by a sliding door as Kylo Ren uses the Force to grab ahold of the PTUs, conducting their movement in a final effort to extract the location of the secret base. However, a damaged ship strikes the exterior of the Star Destroyer behind him, blowing a hole in the wall that opens a vacuum into space and distracts Kylo Ren enough for the R-5 units to regain control and enter an Escape Pod. The Escape Pod is a concealed drop tower set atop a motion simulator, initiating a free-fall and simulated descent back to Batuu. The Escape Pods crash-land in an open air hangar on Batuu, where a third Pod containing Lieutenant Bek also arrives, thanking recruits for keeping the location of the base secret and announcing that their heroism makes them official members of the Resistance.

== Technology and effects ==
Official poster art

Star Wars: Rise of the Resistance is unique that it the attraction includes multiple "pre-shows" (some experienced mid-attraction rather than before) and multiple ride systems (including turntable stages, motion simulators, an LPS-powered trackless dark ride, and a drop tower).

In the briefing room scene, BB-8 can be seen rolling on a rock wall. He is actually a puppet attached to a robotic arm with a rotating spherical shell, which is the reason why he rolls up to a specific point. Next to BB-8 is a large hologram effect of Rey, which is accomplished with an OLED display behind a one-way mirror. In the transport, guests enter and exit through the same door, but exit onto the Star Destroyer. The transport is a motion simulator on a turntable. While the simulator is in motion, it is rotated so that guests will exit into the Star Destroyer set with moving flaps for safety once the simulator has stopped. The animation is in sync with the circular motion.

During the interrogation, the images of General Hux and Kylo Ren are a Musion effect; however additional projectors are used to create shadows as though the actors were physically present. Before the riders board their vehicles, LED strips hidden in the wall, semi-transparent paint, and strobe lights are used to simulate the metal being cut, which slides away through the use of a mechanism. Riders then board a ride vehicle that utilizes wireless charging, as well as RFID pucks in the floor to give the vehicle position data and allow it to navigate the attraction without a track. The vehicles are always stationed on charging pads when they are in the load and unload zones in order to remain at full charge.

The blasters throughout the ride use either a persistence of vision effect or arrays of LEDs to give the illusion the beams are traveling through air. Projectors and flipping panels are also used to simulate damage as it occurs to equipment and sets during the ride.

The room with AT-ATs only contains two, but the use of a mirror makes it look like there are four. When the vehicles stop on the lifts, flaps come up to prevent the vehicles from rolling off. When Kylo Ren appears for the second time, he is a projection on a moving screen, while his lightsaber is a prop.

In the elevator scene (which is actually a static room with lights to give the illusion the riders are in a moving elevator), the blade of Kylo Ren's lightsaber is actually a rapidly spinning light panel which moves on a semicircular track to give the illusion it is cutting through the roof. The cannons are situated in front of a large screen. Each cannon has its own system to ensure it does not hit the vehicles. Blasts from the Resistance cause damage to the walls, which are actually panels that move away to show internal parts.

During the scene where the wall breaks behind Kylo Ren, panels move away to simulate breaking, complete with a wind effect to simulate being blown out. The escape pods are a motion simulator on a drop shaft in front of a large projection screen. Each pod also has a locking mechanism to prevent the vehicles from sliding.

== Reception ==
The ride has received widespread acclaim. During its reporting of its fiscal first-quarter 2020 results on February 4, The Walt Disney Company announced that attendance rose 2 percent at its domestic theme parks during that quarter. Moreover, spending at the U.S. parks was up 10 percent. Disney CEO Bob Iger reported that the twin debuts of the Rise of the Resistance attractions in both Walt Disney World and Disneyland have contributed to an increase in per-capita spending in the parks.

Due to significant guest demand, Disney initially implemented a system of gaining a place on the ride via their respective Disney park smartphone app, as opposed to their usual "FastPass" system. Guests were required to register for a boarding group (effectively a virtual queue) on their phone or at in-park kiosks in order to gain access to the ride, which garnered mixed reactions from park attendees in both Disneyland and Disney's Hollywood Studios. Early on, guests found that boarding groups filled for the day within minutes of the park opening, requiring guests to arrive to the park at its opening time in order to secure a place in line to go on the ride. The boarding group numbers were "called" sequentially through the day; there was no specific time at which a given group would be called, and after receiving the call (by mobile push notification) a guest had one hour to enter the queue line for the ride. When the Disneyland version first opened, there was only one window for the virtual queue for the attraction, but after Disneyland reopened on April 30, 2021 after being closed for over a year due to the COVID-19 pandemic, an additional second window was added to the virtual queue system giving guests a better chance at reserving a spot on the ride. As of July 2021, it took less than a second for the virtual queue to be filled. For a time, guests needed be in the park to apply for a boarding group and Disney took the step of opening the main hub of the Hollywood Studios park early to implement this new system. In November 2020, the necessity to be in the park for the first distribution of boarding groups at 7 AM was removed; the second distribution at 1 PM still required guests to have entered the park.

From September 23, 2021, the boarding group virtual queue system was paused, meaning that guests at Disney Hollywood Studios could, for the first time, walk up and wait in line for Rise of the Resistance. The change led to very high demand and queue lines running through a large part of the park. The Disneyland version of the ride followed suit the following November.
