= Star Destroyer =

Fictional class of armed starships

Star Destroyers are a class of capital ships in the fictional Star Wars universe. The iconic opening scene of Star Wars (1977) is the first appearance of the Imperial-class Star Destroyer, which are ubiquitous in the original trilogy. Numerous other Star Destroyer designs have since been introduced, including the precursor Venator-class Star Destroyer (prequel trilogy) and successor Resurgent-class Star Destroyer (sequel trilogy). Beyond the movies, Star Destroyers feature heavily in other Star Wars media and numerous models and toys have been released.

== Overview ==
Within the fictional setting of the Star Wars universe, Star Destroyers were produced by Kuat Drive Yards, later Kuat-Entralla Engineering, and serve as "the signature vessel of the fleet" for the Galactic Republic, Galactic Empire, and First Order. Numerous classes/types of Star Destroyers have appeared throughout the history of the Star Wars galaxy. According to Star Wars Legends continuity, the Star Destroyer classification is often said to have begun during the Clone Wars, though the basic design elements take much inspiration from vessels of the then ancient Sith Empire.

A single Star Destroyer could project considerable influence over a star system in the name of the Empire: each can be deployed individually as both a forward operating base and as mobile weapon systems platform responsible for safeguarding multiple planets, trade routes, and systems, and carried enough firepower to subdue an entire planetary system or annihilate a small rebel fleet [].

== Imperial Star Destroyer ==
Imperial-class Star Destroyer
- A pair of Imperial II-class Star Destroyers and a group of TIE fighters pursue the Millennium Falcon in The Empire Strikes Back.
- First appearance: Star Wars: A New Hope (1977)

Information
- Affiliation: Galactic Empire
- Made by: Kuat Drive Yards
- Combat vehicles: 72 TIE fighters
- Auxiliary vehicles: 20 AT-ATs; 30 AT-STs or AT-DPs; 15 ITTs; 8 Lambda-class shuttles; Sentinel-class landing craft; Single-walker landing barges

General characteristics
- Class: Battleship
- Armaments: Heavy turbolaser turrets (6); Heavy ion cannon turrets (2); Heavy turbolaser batteries (60); Ion cannons (60); Tractor beam projectors (10)
- Defenses: Deflector shield generators; Armor Plating
- Propulsion: Ion engines; Class 2 hyperdrive
- Mass: 40 million tons
- Length: 1,600 m (5,200 ft)
- Population volume: 9,235 officers; 27,850 enlisted personnel; 9,700 stormtroopers; Visiting Sith Lords

=== Concept and design ===
In draft scripts for the film that would become Star Wars, the term "Stardestroyer" refers to two-man fighters flown by what would become the Galactic Empire. The film's second draft features four Star Destroyers chasing a single Rebel ship, but the tremendous costs incurred by Industrial Light & Magic (ILM) when production began helped lead Lucas to use a single "terrifyingly large" Star Destroyer instead of four. ILM built a 91-centimeter (36 in) shooting model that was about half the size of the model for the Tantive IV the Star Destroyer was chasing. Lucas asked ILM to build a larger Star Destroyer model to match the Tantive IV's scale, but ILM convinced him that the Dykstraflex camera invented for the film made this unnecessary. Nevertheless, they added additional hull details to the Star Destroyer model. The 13-second opening shot was the first special effects piece ILM completed, and its success was an essential test for the Dykstraflex.

ILM built a 259-centimeter (102 in) Star Destroyer, equipped with internal lighting to provide a better sense of scale, for The Empire Strikes Back (1980). According to chief model maker Lorne Peterson, the new Star Destroyer model was scaled to appear two and a half miles long, though their official length was revised in later sources.

The Imperial I-class Star Destroyers are white, as shown in A New Hope, Rogue One, and Solo. The Imperial II-class Star Destroyers in The Empire Strikes Back and Return of the Jedi are grey.

=== Depiction ===
The iconic Imperial-class Star Destroyer first appears in the opening scene of Star Wars (1977), where the Imperial Star Destroyer Devastator (carrying Darth Vader) chases the CR90 Corvette Tantive IV (carrying Princess Leia) above Tatooine after the latter had fled from Scarif. Background literature describes Imperial-class Star Destroyers as the chief warship of the Imperial Navy and symbol of Imperial might. These enormous capital ships are used to enforce the Emperor's will, bolster Imperial-backed governments, and act as mobile headquarters for senior Imperial commanders. At the Empire's height there were over 25,000 Star Destroyers in existence, requiring roughly 925 million crew.

A Star Destroyer has the firepower to bombard a city into a crater of steaming sludge and lay waste to continents. Deep-crust survival bunkers are regarded as a last refuge in the event of planetary bombardment by Imperial Star Destroyers. In addition to their powerful armament, a Star Destroyer carries troops and vehicles for ground operations and a full wing of TIE fighters (typically 48 fighters, 12 bombers and 12 boarding craft). A single Star Destroyer is considered sufficient to overwhelm a rebellious planet, though major industrialized worlds may be assaulted by a fleet of six Star Destroyers with support cruisers and supply craft.

Darth Vader's Devastator is the last of the Imperial I-class ships to be built by Kuat Drive Yards before switching to the Imperial II-class, a fleet of which take part in the Battle of Hoth as depicted in The Empire Strikes Back (1980). Designated Death Squadron, this fleet of Star Destroyers is led by Darth Vader aboard the Executor, first in a new class of Super Star Destroyer. Although the battle is won by Imperial forces, Vader orders his Star Destroyers to focus on capturing the Millennium Falcon rather than hunt down the escaping Rebel transports, allowing many to escape. The Falcon manages to evade this pursuit by hiding in the sensor blind spot of the Star Destroyer Avenger.

These ships play a major role in the Battle of Endor as depicted in Return of the Jedi (1983). During the battle, Imperial Star Destroyers prove vulnerable to fleets of starfighters flown by skilled Rebel pilots, who exploit the ships' exposed bridges and deflector shield generators to cause damage. A year after their defeat at Endor, the Empire makes a last stand at Jakku. During the battle, Imperial Star Destroyers use their tractor beams to drag New Republic ships down to the planet's surface. Here their wrecks form the Graveyard of Ships as seen in The Force Awakens (2015).

=== Analysis ===
Examining what it would take to realistically build an Imperial Star Destroyer, it was estimated in 2016 that such a vessel would cost $636 billion USD. However, getting the parts into space to construct the Star Destroyer would require an additional US$44.4 trillion in launch costs, suggesting that asteroid mining and refining technologies would have to be developed first to make it more economical. More recent estimates suggest a cost of over US$100 trillion based on the Imperial Star Destroyer's stated weight of approximately 40 million tons, making it outside the scope of any nation to build on their own.

Joe Pappalardo of Popular Mechanics argues that the Imperial Star Destroyer is a poorly-designed spaceship, being asymmetrical with its superstructure jutting out in one direction. Additionally, while its wedge shape would make sense for atmospheric travel, it serves no purpose in space. He argues a more realistic and effective design would be symmetrical and bowl-shaped like a saucer.

BJ Armstrong, an assistant professor of war studies and naval history at the United States Naval Academy, says Star Destroyers represent a failure in the architecture of the Imperial fleet to meet the Rebel threat. Building off experiences from the Clone Wars, the fleet was based around large starships like the Star Destroyer which could carry out squadron- and fleet-level operations. While capable of winning battles, a small number of large warships are ill-suited for the constabulary role needed to establish security over large sections of space, thus allowing for non-state actors to operate within them at will. Instead, a larger number of smaller warships would be more suited for patrolling these areas and provide more opportunities for junior officers to develop their skills.

=== Cultural influence ===
Lego has released multiple different Star Destroyer kits over the years, from small sets with just 21 pieces to the largest versions with thousands of pieces. These include two Ultimate Collector Series models, the first of which was released in 2002. Measuring 37-inch (940 mm) long and 23-inch (580 mm), it sold for $269.99 until being retired in 2007. The second UCS Star Destroyer was larger, 43-inch (1,100 mm) long and 26-inch (660 mm) wide, and sold for $699.99 between 2019 and 2022.

== Super Star Destroyer ==
=== Concept and design ===
For The Empire Strikes Back, George Lucas wanted Darth Vader's new flagship, Executor, to be huge and to play a greater role in the film. According to chief model maker Lorne Peterson, the Executor's model was 6 feet (1.8 meters) long and constructed with over 150,000 individual lights. The resulting model was so heavy it required additional support to keep from overwhelming the Dykstraflex's mechanical structure. The ship was originally scaled to appear 16 miles (26 km) long according to Lorne, though later sources would amend this figure.

=== Depiction ===
Within the Star Wars universe, the term "Super Star Destroyer" is a colloquialism used to refer to any ship larger than an Imperial Star Destroyer. The largest and most powerful of these is the Executor, which first appeared in The Empire Strikes Back (1980) as the personal flagship of Darth Vader. The first in a line of Executor-class Star Dreadnoughts, the ship is over 19,000 m (62,000 ft) in length, propelled by thirteen colossal engines and a Class 1 hyperdrive. Its armament includes over 5,000 turbolasers, ion cannons and tractor beam projectors and it can carry more than 1,000 vessels. The crew of the Executor numbers in the hundreds of thousands. Its command tower, rising above the ship's technoscape on a thick stalk, is a standard model found on other Star Destroyers – including a pair of geodesic domes containing communication transceivers, sensors and deflector shield projectors – and allows for an unobstructed view of the battlefield. At least twelve of these vessels were built by the Empire, including the Executor, Annihilator, Ravager and Arbitrator, but the exact number is unknown thanks to Imperial propaganda and black budgets.

From the bridge of the Executor, Darth Vader leads Death Squadron during the Battle of Hoth and afterwards in pursuit of the Millennium Falcon. It later serves as the Imperial command ship during the Battle of Endor. At Endor, intense bombardment by the Rebel Alliance fleet cause the ship's shields to fail, allowing Rebel starfighters to strafe the command tower. During this attack an A-wing piloted by Arvel Crynyd crashes into the command bridge, destroying the main navigation complex and causing the vessel to lose control. The Executor is lost when the second Death Star's gravity well pulls the ship into its surface, destroying the vessel and damaging the Death Star itself. At Jakku where the Empire made its last stand, the Super Star Destroyer Ravager is one of the wrecks which make up the Graveyard of Ships.

=== Analysis ===
Rhett Allain, an associate professor of physics at Southeastern Louisiana University, examined the death of the Executor in a Star Wars Day-themed article for Wired. According to him, the Executor impacted the second Death Star traveling at 3.5 km/s (7,800 mph), which—assuming the collision was strictly a result of gravitational interaction between the two objects—would require a super-dense Death Star to achieve such an impact velocity. Additionally, the Executor had a near constant angular velocity of 0.159 radians/second during the scene where it rotates to face the Death Star. For the crew at the front of the ship, this would result in a centripetal acceleration of 39 G.

If a model of the Executor was built to scale and placed hovering over New York City, it would cast a shadow over the island of Manhattan.

=== Cultural influence ===
Like the Imperial Star Destroyer, the Super Star Destroyer has also been merchandised. Lego released a 125-centimetre (49 in) 3,152-piece model of the Executor. Kenner wanted to use a less ominous name than Executor for the toy playset of Darth Vader's meditation chamber. An advertisement agency's list of 153 alternatives included Starbase Malevolent, Black Coven, Haphaestus VII, and Cosmocurse; ultimately, the toy was labeled "Darth Vader's Star Destroyer". In 2006, Wizards of the Coast created an Executor miniature as part of its Star Wars Miniatures Starship Battles game. An electronic Super Star Destroyer toy released by Hasbro "is the rarest among Hasbro's Collector Fleet".

== Venator Star Destroyer ==
Venator-class Star Destroyer
- A Venator-class Star Destroyer as depicted in Star Wars: The Clone Wars
- First appearance: Star Wars: Clone Wars (2005)
- Last appearance: Star Wars: The Bad Batch (2021-2023)

Information
- Affiliation: Galactic Republic; Galactic Empire
- Launched: 22 BBY (Note: Years before the Battle of Yavin)
- Decommissioned: 19-14 BBY (Note: In Legends continuity, the Venator served the Empire well into the Galactic Civil War, but in a reduced role.)
- Made by: Kuat Drive Yards
- Combat vehicles: 420 starfighters
- Auxiliary vehicles: 40 LAAT gunships; 20 AT-TEs

General characteristics
- Class: Battleship/Carrier
- Armaments: Heavy turbolaser turrets (8); Medium dual turbolaser turrets (2); Point-defense laser cannons (52); Proton torpedo tubes (4); Tractor beam projectors (6)
- Defenses: Deflector shields
- Propulsion: Ion engines; Class 1 Hyperdrive
- Length: 1,137 m (3,730 ft)
- Width: 548 m (1,798 ft)
- Height: 268 m (879 ft)
- Population volume: 7,400

=== Concept and design ===
The design of the Venator-class Star Destroyers appearing in Revenge of the Sith (2005) are meant to bridge the appearance of the Acclamator-class transports in Attack of the Clones (2002) and the Imperial-class in the original trilogy. This included making use of the Imperial Star Destroyer bridge set for interior shots of the Venator as a connecting theme. Additionally, the changing coloration of the Star Destroyers is meant to represent the downfall of the Republic and rise of the Empire. At the start of the film they are given a red paint scheme first established in The Phantom Menace (1999) as representing the Republic, but by the end they are colorless.

=== Depiction ===
The Venator-class Star Destroyer makes its first theatrical appearance in Revenge of the Sith during the opening Battle of Coruscant. Within the Star Wars setting, these ships are regarded as the most powerful capital ships of the Republic Navy during the Clone Wars, serving double duty as battleships and starfighter carriers. These massive ships require a relatively small crew to operate, a deliberate feature compensating for the fact that the Separatists can produce battle droids faster than the Republic can grow clone troopers. As a true warship, the Venator-class can feed nearly its entire reactor output (which at maximum power consumes 40,000 tons of fuel per second) into its heavy turbolasers to devastating effect. As a carrier, the Star Destroyer can rapidly deploy hundreds of starfighters, including ARC-170s, V-wings, Z-95 Headhunters and Jedi interceptors, from a .5 km (0.31 mi)-long dorsal flight deck. While strong deflector shielding is employed around the armored bow doors, they are slow to open or close, presenting a weakness in the vessel's design.

During the Clone Wars these Star Destroyers, referred to also as Republic attack cruisers or Jedi cruisers, play an important role combating Separatist fleets and providing supporting fire for ground forces. Thanks to their superior firepower, the Venator-class has a strong advantage against Separatist warships, and a small flotilla of attack cruisers can easily blast through the deflector shields of a Trade Federation Battleship. At the Battle of Coruscant, over a thousand attack cruisers are deployed to defend the planet, one of which (the Star Destroyer Guarlara) delivers a devastating barrage to the Invisible Hand at point-blank range. After the end of the Clone Wars and creation of the Galactic Empire, these Star Destroyers will continue to serve for decades in the Imperial Navy until eventually replaced with the Imperial-class Star Destroyer.

=== Cultural influence ===
There have been five different Lego sets of the Venator released since 2009, with the most recent one revealed in 2023. This version of the Venator, part of the Ultimate Collector Series, was released in celebration of the 20th anniversary of the Star Wars: The Clone Wars TV show. Measuring 43-inch (1,100 mm) long, 21-inch (530 mm) wide and 12.5-inch (320 mm) tall, the set consists of 5,374 pieces and comes with a commemorative plaque, at an original retail price of $649.99.

For the 2016 Consumer Electronics Show, noted modder Sander van der Velden created a custom-built PC made to look like a Venator Star Destroyer. Built around a fully-functional, liquid-cooled PC, the surrounding case was constructed in the shape of a Venator using aluminum and 3D printed material. The final product required 400 hours of work to complete.

== Resurgent Star Destroyer ==
Resurgent-class Star Destroyer
- First appearance: Star Wars: The Force Awakens (2015)

Information
- Affiliation: First Order
- Made by: Kuat-Entralla Engineering
- Combat vehicles: Two wings of TIE fighters
- Auxiliary vehicles: Over 100 assault vehicles

General characteristics
- Class: Capital Ship
- Armaments: Over 1,500 tubolasers and ion cannons; Point-defense turrets and missile emplacements; Tractor beam projectors
- Defenses: Deflector shield generators; Armor Plating
- Propulsion: Ion engines; Hyperdrive
- Length: 2,916 m (9,567 ft)
- Population volume: 19,000 officers; 55,000 enlisted personnel; Over 8,000 stormtroopers

In Star Wars: The Force Awakens (2015), set 30 years after the fall of the Empire, a new class of Star Destroyer is introduced in service to the First Order. The Finalizer, the first of the Resurgent-class Star Destroyers built in secret by Kuat-Entralla Engineering, serves as the flagship for both Kylo Ren and General Hux.

=== Concept and design ===
Various concept art for a new class of Star Destroyers was created in the development of The Force Awakens, with a finalized designed — drawn by VFX art director James Clyne — approved in July 2014. Clyne had experimented with using negative spaces in creating the Star Destroyer, similar to his earlier work on Star Trek Into Darkness. He said he had fun working on it as director J. J. Abrams was heavily involved in the process and offered suggestions. Clyne also drew concept art for the Finalizer's hangar, and when it came time to build the set at Pinewood Studios, he relocated there for a month to supervise the construction.

=== Depiction ===
Resurgent-class Star Destroyers are described in background literature as a clear violation of the treaties between the New Republic and the First Order. The development of such capital ships is kept a secret for many years by the First Order — constructed deep within the Unknown Regions — but once they become aware General Leia and the Resistance go to great lengths to track and report on such vessels to the New Republic. However, Leia is considered a warmonger by many in the Senate and so her warnings are dismissed until it is too late.

While evoking the traditional Imperial-class Star Destroyer, the Resurgent-class is said within Star Wars literature to incorporate a number of fixes to the former's design flaws. These include a less-exposed command bridge with an emergency backup in case it is destroyed; better-defended shield generators; and a larger fighter complement that can be more quickly launched from dorsal flight decks and side hangers. The ship's turbolasers, powerful enough to slug it out with capital ships or reduce planetary surfaces to molten slag, have greater firepower and faster recharge rates than Imperial models thanks to the use of Kyber focusing crystals. For planetary assaults, the ship carries a full legion of over 8,000 stormtroopers and over a hundred assault vehicles, including walkers. While lacking the resources to produce as many of these ships as once served the Empire, the Resurgent-class is nevertheless meant to symbolize the First Order's power and return to Imperial glory.

The Finalizer features as the command ship for both Kylo Ren and General Hux during their journeys in The Force Awakens and Star Wars: The Last Jedi (2017). However, sometime before as the events of Star Wars: The Rise of Skywalker (2019), Resistance hero Finn manages to sneak aboard and severely damaged the ship. This forces Ren to transfer his command over to a new Resurgent-class Star Destroyer, the Steadfast, and reduces Hux to a junior member of the First Order Supreme Council.

=== Cultural influence ===
When the Finalizer's name was first revealed, Brent McKnight of MovieWeb felt like it was both silly and frightening, saying "[i]t sounds like something a little kid would come up with, but it's also super ominous and intimidating at the same time." He also observed the design was instantly recognizable as a Star Destroyer while having appropriate differences to represent the thirty years that took place between its introduction in the story and the original. B. Alan Orange of MovieWeb also felt the design of the Finalizer was intimidating and scary while still being instantly recognizable as a Star Destroyer. They also believed it had the "perfect pulp name", keeping in theme with the movie's new superweapon, Starkiller Base.

YouTube content creator "LegoSpencer" was inspired to build a model of the TIE fighter hangar bay on the Finalizer, a process which took six weeks to complete.

The opening scene of The Last Jedi shows a fleet of Resurgent-class Star Destroyers appearing above the Resistance base on D'Qar. Using the principal of angular resolution and their known length, Professor Rhett Allain determined the Star Destroyers had an angular size of .75 degrees, putting them at a distance of 221 kilometers. The same ships would still be visible if they were in low Earth orbit at about 400 kilometers (the same as the International Space Station) but with an angular size of .4 degrees.

== Mega Star Destroyer ==
Mega-class Star Destroyer
- First appearance: Star Wars: The Last Jedi (2017)

Information
- Affiliation: First Order
- Made by: Kuat-Entralla Engineering
- Auxiliary vehicles: 8 Resurgent-class Star Destroyers

General characteristics
- Class: Dreadnought
- Armaments: Heavy turbolasers; Heavy ion cannons; Antiship missile batteries; Tractor beam projectors
- Defenses: Deflector shield generators; Armor Plating
- Propulsion: Sublight engine arrays; Hyperdrive
- Length: 13,234 m (43,419 ft)
- Width: 60,543 m (198,632 ft)
- Height: 3,975 m (13,041 ft)
- Population volume: 2,225,000 personnel

The Mega-class Star Dreadnought Supremacy made its first theatrical appearance in Star Wars: The Last Jedi (2017). Described as the command ship for Supreme Leader Snoke, it was stated to be 60 km (37 mi) wide, making it significantly larger than any previous Super Star Destroyer.

=== Concept and design ===
Director Rian Johnson came up for the idea of basing the Supremacy on a flying wing, picking the final exterior look from concept art created by design supervisor Kevin Jenkins. "It's a big flying city," said Jenkins. "Vader's Executor is simply a headquarters, but Snoke doesn't have a planet, so he lives on the ship." The Supremacy's bridge was also designed by Jenkins, who wanted it to mirror the wideness of the ship itself.

=== Depiction ===
Described as the only Mega-class Star Destroyer in the galaxy, the Supremacy serves not only as the flagship but as the capital of the First Order. Rather than choosing one of the settled planets claimed by the First Order, this decision for a mobile headquarters is said to represent the Order's dream of restoring the Empire and expanding upon it. Built at a staggering cost within the Unknown Regions, the existence of "Snoke's boudoir" is only a rumor among Resistance personnel until it finally reveals itself.

Thousands of heavy turbolasers, antiship missile batteries, heavy ion cannons and tractor beam projectors gives the ship firepower equivalent to an entire fleet. The vessel also possesses an industrial capacity that would rival most planets, with asteroid mining complexes, foundries, production lines, research labs and training centers. Six external and two internal stations allow Resurgent-class Star Destroyers to dock with the Supremacy. A majority of the ship's 2,225,000 crew are adolescents still in training to become stormtroopers and officers.

The Supremacy reveals itself in The Last Jedi at the head of the fleet pursuing the Resistance after their flight from D'Qar, having used the immense processing power of its vast number of computer arrays to track them through hyperspace. This pursuit continues in realspace, with the Supremacy destroying the majority of the Resistance fleet while the Raddus continues to survive thanks to its experimental deflector shields. However, running low on fuel, the Resistance hatches a plan to secretly escape aboard cloaked U-55 orbital loadlifters to nearby Crait. The plan is foiled when the cloaked ships are revealed by DJ (Benicio del Toro) and the Supremacy turns its cannons on the helpless shuttles. Desperate, Vice Admiral Amilyn Holdo (Laura Dern) turns the Raddus around and rams the Supremacy at lightspeed, splitting the Mega-Destroyer in two.

=== Analysis ===
Martin Docherty of Space.com looked at the possible physics behind the scene in The Last Jedi where Vice Admiral Holdo destroys the Supremacy by ramming it at lightspeed with the Raddus. Using the estimate that the Raddus massed 8.88 billion kilograms and was traveling at 99.9% of the speed of light, it would have a Lorentz factor of 22.366 and impact with a final kinetic energy of 17 × 10^{27} joules. Such an impact would create shrapnel which, while moving slower than lightspeed, would still cause immense damage, as was seen in the movie.

Rhett Allain, an associate professor at Southeastern Louisiana University, examined the turbolaser shots fired by the Supremacy in The Last Jedi and observed how these shots arced through space as opposed to flying straight as in previous movies. Noting that these shots took 1.58 seconds to reach the Raddus, he estimated they were traveling 100,000 meters per second with an apparent vertical acceleration of 2.4 × 10^{4} meters per second squared.

=== Cultural influence ===
Upon the first reveal of the Supremacy, B. Alan Orange noted that, despite the ship's unique design, it still retained a familiar shape which immediately identified it as belonging to the First Order. Corey Larson of Screen Rant believed that, regardless of the film's wider reputation, the introduction of the Supremacy and its subsequent destruction during The Last Jedi represented one of the coolest additions to the franchise from the Star Wars sequel trilogy. John Orquiola meanwhile felt the ship represented an ongoing superweapon problem with the franchise. While crediting Rian with not introducing another Death Star-like weapon, it still showed that the First Order, like the Empire before it, was obsessed with equating size with power and creating "unbeatable" superweapons which are eventually destroyed.

== Sith Star Destroyer ==
Xyston-class Star Destroyer
- First appearance: Star Wars: The Rise of Skywalker (2019)

Information
- Affiliation: Sith Eternal
- Made by: Kuat-Entralla Engineering
- Combat vehicles: TIE Daggers

General characteristics
- Class: Star Destroyer
- Armaments: 40 heavy turbolaser batteries; 40 ion cannons; 40 point-defense laser cannons; 35 variable-ordance warhead launchers; 10 heavy tractor beam projectors; Axial superlaser
- Defenses: Deflector shield generators
- Propulsion: Sublight enginers; Hyperdrive
- Length: 2,406 m (7,894 ft)
- Height: 682 m (2,238 ft)
- Population volume: 29,585

In Star Wars: The Rise of Skywalker (2019), a resurrected Darth Sidious unveils a new class of Star Destroyer as part of the Sith Eternal's fleet, the Final Order.

=== Depiction ===
Identified by in-universe sources as Xyston-class but referred to informally as Sith Star Destroyers, these ships resemble the older Imperial I-class Star Destroyers but are much larger and contain more automation to reduce crew requirements. They are built on Exegol by automated factories described as dating back to the old Sith Wars, but which Darth Sidious modernized upon the creation of the Empire. Construction is continued after its fall thanks to Sith loyalists on the executive boards of many ship manufacturers secretly funneling resources to the project. Automation is incorporated to reduce crew size, many of whom are the children of Sith Loyalists trained their entire lives for this purpose. The distinguishing feature of these Sith Star Destroyers is an axial superlaser powerful enough to shatter a planet. Such power is made possible by a solar ionization reactor channeling the energy of a miniature sun through kyber crystals. However, hangar space and storage are sacrificed to make room for the superlaser, and the connection between superlaser and reactor would result in the destruction of the entire ship if one or the other were destroyed.

Emblazoned with the red markings of the Sith Eternal fleet, hundreds of these Sith Star Destroyers are ready when Allegiant General Pryde (Richard E. Grant) is ordered by Palpatine to deploy them across the galaxy. The icy world of Kijimi is the first to be destroyed by the Star Destroyer Derriphan. However, before the rest of the fleet carry out this plan, the Resistance attacks their base on Exegol, and thanks to the timely arrival of the Citizen's Fleet are able to destroy them.

=== Cultural influence ===
While impressed with the ships themselves, Adrienne Tyler was also very disappointed with how The Rise of Skywalker - similar to its treatment of other story elements - did not fully develop where they came from and how they operated, instead leaving these details to be explained in companion books. J.R. Zambrano meanwhile felt the ships exemplified the laziness of the film's crazy excesses and criticized how despite their planet-destroying power a makeshift fleet of civilians was able to destroyed them all.

== List of other Star Destroyers ==
- Victory Star Destroyer: The Victory-class Star Destroyer originally featured only in Star Wars Legends novellas (see below). It first appeared in the new Star Wars canon in the 2014 novel Tarkin, written by James Luceno, and was first depicted in Darth Vader 6: Vader, Part VI, a 2015 comic book written by Kieron Gillen and illustrated by Salvador Larroca. The Victory Star Destroyer is the Imperial Navy's starting vessel in the core set of Fantasy Flight Games's Star Wars: Armada, a table top miniatures game released on March 27, 2015. The Victory I-class was plagued with many issues that it developed a negative reception in the Republic Navy and the succeeding Imperial Navy. A retrofitting program under the Empire upgraded existing Victory I Star Destroyers into the Victory II-class in an attempt to address its flaws, but many still remained.
- Interdictor Star Destroyer - The Interdictor-class Star Destroyer was first introduced in Legends before being introduced in canon in Vader Immortal: A Star Wars VR Series. This variant is a derivative of the Imperial-class Star Destroyer as well as the successor to the Interdictor-class heavy cruiser. The Interdictor-class was equipped with four spheroidal gravity well projectors that were used to prevent ships from jumping into hyperspace, as well as forcibly removing ships from it.

== Star Wars Legends ==
In April 2014, most of the licensed Star Wars novels, games, and comics produced since 1976 (and prior to 2014), were rebranded by Lucasfilm as Star Wars Legends; and therefore declared non-canon to the franchise.

Star Destroyers feature in numerous Legends publications, with a considerable amount of additional notable information. According to West End Games' Star Wars: The Roleplaying Game sourcebooks and other texts, Imperial-class Star Destroyers are constructed by Kuat Drive Yards and hold a distinguished place in the Imperial Navy, symbolizing the Empire's military might with a peak number of more than 25,000 vessels. Like the Venator and Victory-class ships that precede it, the Imperial-class is a multi-role capital ship combining the roles of a battleship, starfighter carrier, and troopship. Notable for its massive size and overwhelming firepower compared to its fore-bearers; a single Imperial-class ship is capable of singlehandedly taking on a fleet of enemy vessels or "reducing the surface of a planet to a slag" (known as "Base Delta Zero"), and its mere presence is often enough to deter rebellion. At 1,600 meters (5,200 ft) long, Imperial-class Star Destroyers are crewed by 9,235 Officers, 27,850 enlisted personnel, and 275 Gunners. The Imperial I is armed with 60 turbolasers, 60 ion cannons, and 10 tractor beam projectors for space combat. The standard complement is 72 TIE fighters (including 12 TIE Bombers and 12-24 TIE Interceptors), and a variety of support craft including shuttles and transports. Unlike other comparable capital ships like the Mon Calamari MC80 Star Cruiser of the Rebel Alliance (later New Republic), an Imperial-class Star Destroyer carries a full array of ground forces (including 9700 stormtroopers, 20 AT-ATs and 30 AT-STs) with dropships for rapid deployment to planetary surfaces, plus a prefabricated base if a permanent planetary garrison is required.

Though the Imperial Navy also has smaller capital ships like Nebulon-B Escort Frigates and CR90 Corvettes (the films show these vessels being used exclusively by the Rebel Alliance), Imperial-class Star Destroyers are usually the default choice for frontline deployments. At the Battle of Endor the Rebel Alliance captured two Imperial-class Star Destroyers and added them to the New Republic fleet; they serve alongside Mon Calamari Cruisers in General Han Solo's task force as told in the X-wing series of novels and Dark Empire comics. Although the New Republic eventually upgrades its starfleet with newer ship types, the Imperial-class Star Destroyer remains in service well into the New Jedi Order era and fights during the Yuuzhan Vong War.

Described in A Guide to the Star Wars Universe (1984) as being 8 kilometers (5.0 mi) long, Executor-class Super Star Destroyers were later described as being 19 kilometers (12 mi) long. In addition to Vader's command ship Executor, Star Wars novels introduce the prison ship Lusankya and stealth-armored Knight Hammer as other in the class. Kevin J. Anderson's novel Darksaber describes a Super Star Destroyer as being "worth twenty Imperial Star Destroyers".

The Forces of Corruption expansion pack to the game Star Wars: Empire at War introduced the Aggressor-class Star Destroyer. Its plans were kept aboard the first Death Star, where they were studied along with other ship designs. Following the Battle of Yavin, the Zann Consortium stole the designs stored in a data pod amidst the wreckage of the battle station, as well as a prototype that Tyber Zann took as his flagship and christened the Merciless, which was heavily modified over three years before being unveiled over Carida. The Aggressor-class featured a bridge and shield generators similar to the Imperial-class, as well as two fire-linked cannons fixed on its forward hull that fired an ion blast that disabled shields, followed by a plasma blast for maximum damage.

The description "Star Destroyer" and "Super Star Destroyer" are applied to several another massive dagger/triangle-shaped warships in Star Wars, such as the Pellaeon-class Star Destroyer in the Legacy comic series (2006–2010), and the reborn Emperor Palpatine's flagships Eclipse and Eclipse II Super Star Destroyers in the Dark Empire series (1991–1995). The Eclipse-class was perhaps the ultimate Super Star Destroyer or Star Dreadnought in the Expanded Universe, incorporating a Death Star-type superlaser but miniaturized and more advanced, and gravity well projectors to prevent enemies from jumping to hyperspace, and having strong enough shields/armor to be able to ram enemy vessels. Curtis Saxton, in the unofficial Star Wars Technical Commentaries (he has since been the author of the official Star Wars: Attack of the Clones Incredible Cross-Sections and Star Wars: Revenge of the Sith Incredible Cross-Sections), has advocated using the term Imperator-class in lieu of Imperial-class. Saxton argues that "Imperial Star Destroyer" is a somewhat generic term, as the vast majority of Star Destroyer types are operated by the Galactic Empire's Imperial Navy which technically means they are all "Imperial Star Destroyers", although the Imperator/Imperial-class Star Destroyers are by far the most common type. Similarly, the "Super Star Destroyer" moniker has been used for numerous unrelated vessels of varying sizes and classes, so fans have suggested labeling the class instead of by the lead ship such as Executor-class and Eclipse-class, with some referring to them instead as a "Star Dreadnought" (sometimes spelled "Star Dreadnaught") to emphasize their massive size relative to Star Destroyers. Author Jason Fry introduced the "Anaxes War College System" which specifically divide warships into different types depending on their size and power, which explain all the differently sized "Super Star Destroyers" appearing in the Expanded Universe (now Star Wars Legends), supplementing the contradictory classification systems used in Star Wars lore previously, becoming reference material in the Star Wars Sourcebooks by West End Games.

The Victory-class Star Destroyer first described in the early Star Wars novella, was initially designed as a direct predecessor to the Imperial-class during the development of A New Hope, which would make it a follow-up to the Venator-class seen in Revenge of the Sith. The Victory appears very similar in appearance to the Imperial-class which succeeded it; albeit the Victory being considerably smaller in scale (900 meters in length versus 1600 meters), adds atmospheric maneuvering "wings" on the port and starboard sides (according to Star Wars: The Roleplaying Game sourcebooks, the Victory I-class can enter a planetary atmosphere which is a unique attribute not found in the Victory II and Imperial-class Star Destroyers), and a shorter conning tower with different elements on the command bridge. The Victory-class was developed from a prototype Star Destroyer model created by Colin Cantwell for A New Hope, with the final design being used for the basis of the Imperial-class.

== See also ==
- List of Star Wars spacecraft
- List of Star Wars starfighters

== Bibliography ==
- Barr, Patricia; Bray, Adam; Jones, Matt; Horton, Cole; Wallace, Daniel; Windham, Ryder (2019). Ultimate Star Wars New Edition. United States: DK Publishing. ISBN 978-1-4654-7900-6.
- Brooks, Dan; Crouse, Megan; Richau, Amy; Ratcliffe, Amy; Wainerdi, Brandon; Zehr, Dan (2024). Star Wars Encyclopedia:The Comprehensive Guide to the Star Wars Galaxy. United States: DK Publishing. ISBN 9780593960547.
- Dougherty, Kerrie; Fry, Jason; Hidalgo, Pablo; Reynolds, David West; Saxton, Curtis; Windham, Ryder (2020). Star Wars Complete Vehicles New Edition. United States: DK Publishing. ISBN 978-0-7440-2057-1.
- Luceno, James; Reynolds, David West; Windham, Ryder; Fry, Jason; Hidalgo, Pablo (2018). Star Wars: The Complete Visual Dictionary. United States: DK Publishing. ISBN 978-1-4654-7547-3.
- Lund, Kristin; Beecroft, Simon; Dougherty, Kerrie; Luceno, James; Fry, Jason (2016). Star Wars: Complete Locations. United States: DK Publishing. ISBN 978-1-4654-5272-6.
- Taylor, Chris (2014). How Star Wars Conquered the Universe: The Past, Present, and Future of a Multibillion Dollar Franchise (eBook). Basic Books. OCLC 889674238.
- Walker, Landry Q. (2018). Star Wars Encyclopedia of Starfighters and Other Vehicles. United States: DK Publishing. ISBN 9781465482716.
