= List of Star Wars weapons =

The following is a list of weapons shown in the Star Wars universe.

== By type ==
=== Directed-energy weapons ===
Directed-energy weapons (DEW) figure prominently in the Star Wars franchise, with the most common type referred to as lasers or blasters. The in-universe description for how these weapons function is that a high-energy gas is charged by a power cell and converted into plasma, which is fired as a coherent energy bolt at the enemy via magnetic bottle effect. Small-arms blasters come in many types, from pistols to rifles, with accuracy and range improving as barrel length increases. Blaster cannons and laser cannons are more powerful types of these weapons commonly found on Star Wars vehicles, starfighters and other spacecraft, with laser cannons generally considered superior of the two. The most powerful type of these weapons are referred to as turbolasers, commonly found on Star Wars capital ships. Turbolasers require large crews and power generators to function but are effective against other capital ships and planetary targets.

Another common type of DEW in the Star Wars universe is the ion cannon, which background literature describes as firing powerful bolts of ionized energy designed to overload electrical systems or fuse mechanical components, disabling a target without causing lasting damage. Jawas use scrap-built ionization blasters to disable droids as seen in A New Hope. The v-150 Planet Defender which appears in The Empire Strikes Back defends the Rebel base on Hoth. A surface-based ion cannon designed to ward off orbiting starships, the v-150 is described as having a maximum range of 180,000 km (110,000 mi) and is powerful enough to disrupt an Imperial Star Destroyer with a single bolt.

A unique type of DEW appearing in Star Wars films and other media are sonic weapons. Such weapons are commonly used by bounty hunters as a way to incapacitate their prey according to background material. It also refers to Geonosians specifically as being well-known within the setting for their sonic weaponry. First appearing in Attack of the Clones, Geonosian sonic weapons are described as using oscillators to create powerful sonic blasts which are enveloped in plasma-containment spheres and fired at the enemy.

Another type of DEW appearing in Star Wars media are ion disruptors. These weapons were originally designed for anti-armor and anti-air roles, and were capable short-circuiting electronics and puncturing up to starship hulls. Outside of their intended role, they gained infamy for their use on organic beings; one blast from a disruptor was able to disintegrate entire groups on a molecular level, causing them to die a slow, agonizing, and excruciatingly gruesome death. Their most notorious usage was during the Siege of Lasan, where the Empire used the T-7 disruptor rifle against the Lasat people; their usage would later be described as genocide for nearly exterminating the species, and they were subsequently banned by the Imperial Senate. The T-7 had a negative psychological effect on the survivors; the mere sight of one of the rifles was enough for a Lasat to recoil in shock. Despite this, disruptors would find popularity in the criminal underworld and among bounty hunters such as Din Djarin, who used a disruptor sniper rifle model known as the Amban phase-pulse blaster.

=== Projectile weapons ===
Within the Star Wars canon, projectile weapons, referred to as slugthrowers, appear in the Star Wars universe in various forms. Reference material identifies the Tusken Raiders as using a type of slugthrower called a cycler rifle, built from stolen and scavenged parts and firing a solid shot enveloped in energy. The bounty hunter Aurra Sing is also identified as wielding an Adventurer slugthrower rifle, which is described as flooding the firing chamber with a rich oxidizer as it detonates its shell to give the projectile extra range and power. Larger versions referred to as mass-driver cannons were typically mounted on walkers such as the AT-TE and AT-AP.

The bowcaster is a crossbow-like weapon carried by Chewbacca (Peter Mayhew/Joonas Suotamo) during the events of the Star Wars films. Canonically, bowcasters were handcrafted by the Wookiees and were a favorite weapon of theirs; other races were generally not strong enough to operate the cocking mechanism. Chewbacca's bowcaster featured an automatic cocking system, an unusual feature for other models at the time. Their function is described in reference material as firing a metal bolt called a quarrel. Alternating polarizer orbs on either end of the bow create a magnetic field which propels the quarrel forward, emerging from the barrel enveloped in blaster energy to give it an explosive impact.

Chirrut Îmwe (Donnie Yen) carries a custom-built bowcaster in Rogue One: A Star Wars Story. Identified as a lightbow, the weapon operates on the same principle as a Wookiee bowcaster and is said to be more powerful than a heavy blaster rifle, allowing Chirrut to shoot down a TIE fighter during the events of the film.

=== Rockets and missiles ===
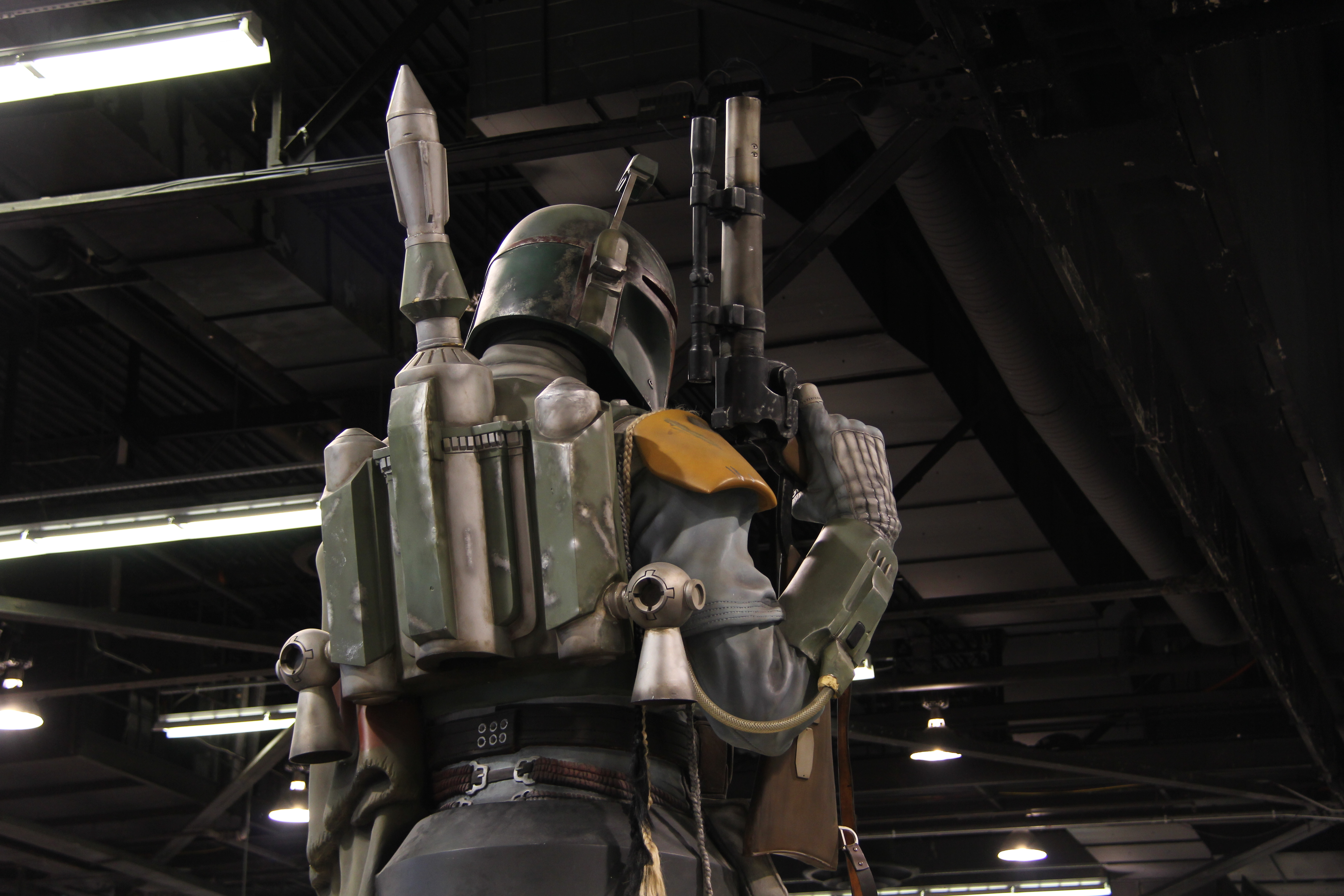
A replica of Boba Fett's outfit, which also includes a small seeker missile mounted on his jet pack

The usage of rockets and missiles is seen frequently throughout the Star Wars franchise, including in films, comics, and novels. Within the Star Wars universe, these weapons are seen as complementary to energy weapons thanks to their ability to go around obstacles to hit targets, including those hiding behind the horizon, and to be fitted with a variety of mission-specific warheads, including antimatter, electromagnetic pulse, and hard radiation. However unlike a blaster bolt a missile can be shot down and is more easily dodged. The use of inertial compensators and tensor fields allow Star Wars missiles to withstand turning accelerations of up to 10,000 G without damaging their components.

In the original Star Wars movie, Luke Skywalker (Mark Hamill) destroys the Death Star by firing a pair of proton torpedoes into its exhaust port. Proton torpedoes are described in background literature as missile weapons which can be fired at long-range targets and, upon impact, release clouds of high-velocity protons to damage the enemy. These weapons can display incredible maneuverability, such as making a 90-degree turn within a turning circle of one meter.

Another type of missile weapon are concussion missiles, such as those seen in Return of the Jedi when Lando Calrissian (Billy Dee Williams) pilots the Millennium Falcon into the Death Star II and destroys its reactor with a pair of concussion missiles. Concussion missiles are said to be primarily used for atmospheric combat, where their explosions create devastating sonic booms and ground tremors that can cause tremendous devastation. However their warheads are still powerful enough that they are effective when used in space combat.

Not all missile weapons in the Star Wars universe carry explosive warheads. The discord missile is a type described by in-universe material as agile enough to avoid anti-missile fire and deploy up to seven buzz droids on a target vessel. These droids then use their mechanical arms and cutting tools to inflict as much damage on the vessel as possible. Discord missiles were first seen in Revenge of the Sith during the opening space battle as a group of missile-deployed buzz droids attack Obi-Wan Kenobi (Ewan McGregor) in his Jedi interceptor.

In The Mandalorian series, whistling birds are a type of small, miniature guided missile used by Mandalorians, most notably by Din Djarin. They are launched from a wrist gauntlet and are considered a rare and powerful weapon.

Many individual characters are seen or described as using rockets and missiles in the Star Wars universe. The bounty hunter Jango Fett (Temuera Morrison) wears a jet pack which can fire an anti-vehicle homing missile, which he uses against Obi-Wan Kenobi in their duel on Kamino in Attack of the Clones. Boba Fett (Jeremy Bulloch) also wears a jet pack which can fire either a homing missile or grappling hook, and carries a wrist-mounted mini concussion rocket launcher which can fire a variety of small homing rockets.

=== Other explosive devices ===
Hand-held explosive devices are commonly seen and mentioned in the Star Wars saga and other media. Many hold a large amount of explosive power in a small package and can be triggered in a variety of ways, such as remotely or via timed fuse. Examples include concussion disks, EMP grenades, and thermal detonators. In Return of the Jedi, a disguised Princess Leia (Carrie Fisher) threatens Jabba the Hutt with a Class-A thermal detonator. Star Wars fiction describes these devices as filled with a volatile baradium core surrounded by a thermite shell and capable of disintegrating anything within a 20 m (66 ft) blast radius.

Another example of unique explosive devices are the Gungan weapons that feature in the climactic battle of The Phantom Menace and are referred to in Star Wars literature as "boomas." It describes these grenade-type weapons as containing plasmic energy which is mined from deep in the porous crust of Naboo and contained within protective shells. Upon impact these shells burst, releasing the plasma and a powerful electric shock on the target. These weapons come in multiple sizes, from handheld types that can be thrown to larger artillery shells launched by catapults and powerful enough to disable an armored tank.

Larger explosive devices include the seismic charges seen on film in Attack of the Clones, where Jango Fett (Temuera Morrison) deploys them in an attempt to destroy Obi-Wan Kenobi (Ewan McGregor) and prevent him from pursuing him. According to the Star Wars Databank, these weapons draw in sound and explode in devastating concussive waves of energy. Another is the electro-proton bomb which made its first appearance in the 2008 Clone Wars television series. Deployed on the planet Malastare, the bomb disabled an entire droid army in one blast but also awakened a slumbering Zillo Beast.

=== Melee ===
The Star Wars universe also makes extensive use of melee weapons, such as staffs, swords, batons and whips. The most notable of those is the lightsaber. The presence of those types of weapons allows for dramatic combat sequences such as lightsaber combat.

A Gaffii Stick or Gaderffii is a staff weapon with a heavy end which appears similar to the medieval flanged mace. These weapons are described in background material as being hand-crafted by Tusken Raiders using a variety of materials, though with a preference for durable metals. They can be wielded a number of different ways to kill an opponent, or to incapacitate them when coated with the paralyzing venom of the fictional sandbat creature native to Tatooine.

An electrostaff is a melee weapon which is designed to withstand lightsaber strikes. According to reference literature, they accomplish this task thanks to the fictional material Phrik, a rare and virtually indestructible alloy which conducts energy. Either end of the staff features electromagnetic modules which, when activated, are sheathed in energy tendrils and deliver debilitating electrical charges that can be adjusted to lethal levels. These weapons made their first theatrical appearance in Revenge of the Sith being used by General Grievous's bodyguards, the IG-100 MagnaGuards, and have featured in other Star Wars media.

Similar to the electrostaff is the Z6 riot control baton, which made its theatrical appearance in The Force Awakens and is utilized by the First Order's stormtroopers to quell riots. Collapsible conductor contact veins are capable of delivering a powerful electric shock to incapacitate an opponent and can deflect a lightsaber blade. Reference literature also states the baton's adhesive grip pairs magnatomically with a stormtrooper's gloves.

Other types of melee weapons have featured in Star Wars Legends continuity. The amphistaff is the primary anti-personnel living weapon of the Yuuzhan Vong. Amphistaff scales can produce an edge harder than a diamond's that can stop a lightsaber. In addition to its default staff/spear configuration, an amphistaff can be wielded as a whip or flail by selectively hardening parts of its body.

Vibroweapons are a highly lethal class of melee weapon that utilises a generator, usually located on the weapon's hilt, to create supersonic vibrations. Many variations of vibroweapon exist; due to the adaptable nature of vibroweapon generators, vibroweapons can be made out of axes, pikes, knives, and swords. At least as far back as 3956 BBY, vibroweapons have often been laced with Cortosis (a rare metal known to short out lightsabers). This allows the user of the vibroblade to defend themself against a lightsaber wielding opponent. Vibroweapons have been used by characters in various media, such as Lando Calrissian from the Star Wars movies and Mission Vao from Star Wars: Knights of the Old Republic. The Emperor's Imperial guards, as seen in Return of the Jedi, use Force Pikes. These not only have a vibrating power tip, but can be set to deliver an electric stun charge. In order to allow this conductivity, the shaft of the force pike is made of reinforced graphite. Not only does this allow the pike to flex to absorb impact rather than breaking, but also means the weapon weighs no more than 7 kg and can therefore be handled with extreme swiftness and agility for a weapon of its length.

==== Lightsabers ====
Lightsabers (also known as laser swords or rens) are described as one of the most rare and mysterious weapons of the Star Wars universe and are generally used by the Jedi, the Sith, and the Knights of Ren, with Mandalorian rulers wielding the darksaber. The standard lightsaber is a sword-like weapon that emits a blade of pure energy from its metal hilt which has no mass but can cut through almost anything and deflect blaster bolts. The core of the lightsaber is a kyber crystal, which according to Star Wars canon acts as the focusing element and takes on a specific color when it "bonds" with someone sensitive to the Force. Variations on the standard design include double-bladed lightsabers like the one wielded by Maul (Ray Park) in The Phantom Menace.

== See also ==
- Weapons in science fiction

== Bibliography ==
- Barr, Patricia; Bray, Adam; Jones, Matt; Horton, Cole; Wallace, Daniel; Windham, Ryder (2019). Ultimate Star Wars New Edition. United States: DK Publishing. ISBN 978-1-4654-7900-6.
- Barr, Tricia; Bray, Adam; Horton, Cole; Horton (2017). Star Wars: The Visual Encyclopedia. United States: DK Publishing. ISBN 978-1-4654-5962-6.
- Dougherty, Kerrie; Fry, Jason; Hidalgo, Pablo; Reynolds, David West; Saxton, Curtis; Windham, Ryder (2020). Star Wars Complete Vehicles New Edition. United States: DK Publishing. ISBN 978-0-7440-2057-1.
- Luceno, James; Reynolds, David West; Windham, Ryder; Fry, Jason; Hidalgo, Pablo (2018). Star Wars: The Complete Visual Dictionary. United States: DK Publishing. ISBN 978-1-4654-7547-3.
- Windham, Ryder (2019). Star Wars TIE Fighter Owner's Workshop Manual. United States: Insight Editions. ISBN 978-1-68383-527-1.
- Windham, Ryder (2018). Star Wars YT-1300 Millennium Falcon Owner's Workshop Manual. United States: Insight Editions. ISBN 978-1-68383-528-8.
