= Blaster (Star Wars) =

Fictional weapon from the Star Wars universe

- Star Wars franchise element
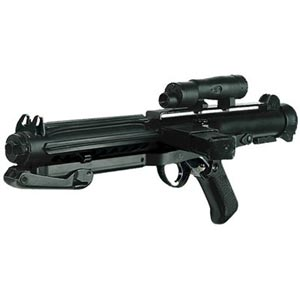
- An E-11 blaster rifle, the standard issue weapon used by Imperial stormtroopers (The prop is based on the frame of a real Sterling submachine gun.)
- Production company: Lucasfilm
- First appearance: Star Wars
- Created by: George Lucas
- Genre: Science fiction

In-universe information
- Type: Raygun
- Function: Shooting
- Affiliation: Galactic Republic; Confederacy of Independent Systems; Galactic Empire; Rebel Alliance; First Order; Resistance; Other

A blaster is a fictional gun that appears in the Star Wars universe. Lucasfilm defines the blaster as "ranged energized particle weaponry". Many blasters mirror the appearance, functions, components, operation, and usage of real life firearms. They are also said to be able to be modified with certain add-ons and attachments, with Han Solo's blaster being said to be illegally modified to provide greater damage without increasing power consumption.

The iconic E-11, a standard mid-range weapon used primarily by stormtroopers, is based on the real-life Sterling sub-machine gun used by the armed forces of the United Kingdom over the second half of the 20th century. Several design changes were made by the filmmakers, such as alterations to the magazine.

== Design in films ==
In the films, the design of the E-11 blaster rifle was based on the Sterling submachine gun. The design of the modified DL-44 blaster pistol owned by Han Solo was based on the 7.63-caliber Mauser C96, an early and successful automatic pistol that was used in World War I and World War II. Lucasfilm's prop department added a scope and an emitter nozzle to the pistol. The blaster made for the 1977 film A New Hope was lost, and a second blaster was made with resin from the cast used for the first one. The blaster was subsequently used as a prop in The Empire Strikes Back and Return of the Jedi. Other heavy repeating blasters, like the T-21 light repeating blaster, were Lewis light machine guns with the barrel shroud and pan magazine removed. Other repeating blasters like the DLT-19 heavy blaster rifle, were made from a MG 34 and the RT-97C heavy blaster rifle was made from a MG 15.

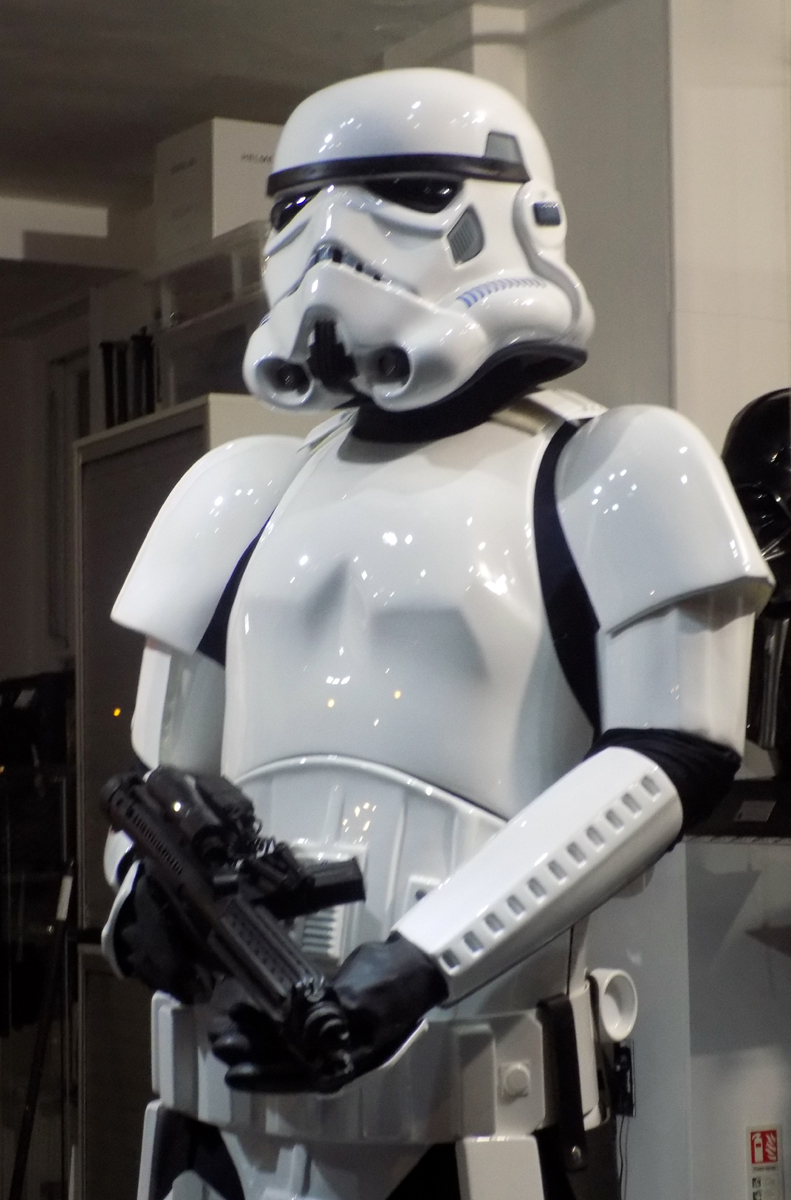
Stormtrooper wielding the E-11 blaster rifle

Functional Sterlings firing blank cartridges were used in some scenes with the laser bolt added later in post-production. These blank cartridges are responsible for the muzzle flash seen on screen and, in some scenes, the cartridges themselves can be seen being ejected from the guns, or the actual sound of the blank cartridge is not dubbed over by a sound effect.

Ben Burtt, a sound designer who worked on the Star Wars films, came up with the sound of blaster fire during a family backpacking trip in the Pocono Mountains in 1976. Burtt hit the guy-wire of an AM radio transmitter tower with a hammer and recorded the sound with a microphone close to the impact.

In a chapter of the book Myth, Media, and Culture in Star Wars, Michael Kaminski, writing about the influence of Japanese director Akira Kurosawa on the Star Wars films, said that Kurosawa's Ran (1985) influenced the exchange of blaster fire in prequel trilogy. Like in Ran, color-coding and an "onscreen sense of direction" of blaster fire are used to depict opposing forces. In the Star Wars original trilogy, rebels employed red blaster fire and often attack from the left, while the Empire also employed red blaster fire, using green blaster fire only with TIE fighters, and attack from the right. In Star Wars: Episode II – Attack of the Clones, the second film of the prequel trilogy, the color and the direction were reversed. In that film, the Republic employed green and blue blaster fire and attack from the right, while the Separatists employed red blaster fire and attack from the left.

== In-universe technology ==
The inner workings of blasters essentially create particle beams to pierce, melt and disintegrate targets. When the trigger is pulled, high-energy gas is excited by a power cell and converted into plasma. This plasma is fired through collimating components in the barrel such as galven circuitry and focusing lens to emerge as a coherent energy bolt held together via magnetic bottle effect. However the bolt's inherent instability is a limiting factor in precision aiming, and it will start to lose coherence while traveling to the target as the plasma dissipates. The longer the barrel the more collimating components it can be fitted with to rectify these problems for increased range and accuracy. Prolonged use will also result in overheating the weapon, which can be counteracted by utilizing alloys with greater heat resistance, and employing heat-dispersal vents and cooling packs and compressors.

Blaster weaponry can vary the intensity of their output, generating bolts of greater destructive power but with corresponding trade-offs. For example, the DC-15 blaster rifle used by clone troopers can blast a hole .5 m (1 ft 8 in) wide in a wall made of the fictional material ferroconcrete when set on maximum power, but doing so consumes more gas and reduces its ammunition capacity from 500 shots to 300. A more powerful blaster bolt also generates more recoil which can make it more difficult to use the weapon.

Different types of gas are used as blaster ammunition, such as the fictional Tibanna gas found in the lower atmosphere of Bespin used to power weapons and other devices. This also results in different coloration depending on the gas used. The least expensive type of gas generate red-colored particle beams, while more expensive gases produce a green particle beam.

Blaster small arms come in a range of sizes, from small hand-held blasters to carbines and larger laser rifles. Some are equipped with features such as a targeting scope or flash and noise suppressor. Others are highly customizable like the A300 blaster rifle used by Rebel commandos on Scarif, with a removable shoulder stock, swappable barrels of different sizes, and other attachments. Certain modifications however are considered inhumane and banned on civilized worlds: the Trandoshan doubler or tripler when added to the barrel of a blaster pistol turns it into a devastating hand cannon. Crew-served blasters also exist, an example being the E-web heavy repeating blaster deployed by snowtroopers on Hoth. The most powerful repeating blaster employed by the Empire, the weapon requires a crew of two to set up its power generator and a rigid mount to counteract the fearsome weapon's recoil.

Larger versions of blaster weaponry in the Star Wars universe are referred to as blaster cannons and laser cannons and commonly found on vehicles, starfighters and other spacecraft. Of the two, laser cannons are considered to be more powerful and to possess greater range. The laser cannons on a Republic LAAT gunship, as an example, can fire bolts of up to five gigajoules in destructive power. Laser cannons may also be fitted on fixed emplacements to defend an area from attack, like the Golan Arms DF.9 anti-infantry battery employed by Rebel defenders at the Battle of Hoth. These cannons have an effective range of 16 km (9.9 mi) and can take out an entire squad of infantry with a single blast.

A more powerful form of the laser cannon is the turbolaser found on Star Wars capital ships, operating on the same principles but with larger power generators and multiperson crews. Such weapons can be used to penetrate the defenses of other capital ships or conduct planetary bombardments. Turbolasers can vary their power intensity depending on the needs of the mission, from simply crippling a target to outright vaporizing it, with true warships like the Venator-class Star Destroyer able to feed nearly their entire reactor output into its heavy turbolasers. With this weaponry, a fleet of warships can reduce the upper crust of a planet to molten slag as part of a "Base Delta Zero" bombardment.

== Analysis ==
External videos
- Is This a Real Life Star Wars Laser? – IGN News

A laser is a device which emits a beam of coherent light at a target. Controlling or containing the direction of light energy is also known as synchronization. This concentration of energy in one direction gives it strong and sometimes powerful intensity. Lasers have different uses for military purposes, many of which strongly differ from what is seen in Star Wars, but still follow the same concepts of concentrating energy and/or material within a limited magnetic range.

Rhett Allai, associate professor of physics at Southeastern Louisiana University, argues the energy bolts fail to fit the definition of laser and explains that in many ways the laser cannons in Star Wars actually defy the rules of physics.

However, a 1995 paper by Richard E. Russo from the National Laboratory in Berkeley, California, discusses the functions of lasers and mildly argues the Star Wars depiction of lasers as accurate.

Researchers at the Laser Centre of the Institute of Physical Chemistry of the Polish Academy of Sciences, in partnership with the Faculty of Physics at the University of Warsaw, published a video that seems to show a laser pulse in flight, as seen in the Star Wars films. To create this video, they filmed many laser pulses at slightly different times with an exposure time of less than one billionth of a second, then combined the still images into a film. The laser is so powerful and intense that it resulted in the air being ionized. The interaction of the pulse with the plasma generates light of many different wavelengths, which appears white.

A more recent and advanced development in 2017 involved students at Macquarie University in Australia developed a method of multiplying laser power by the use of diamonds. This concept is similar to the fictional kyber crystals used in the Star Wars universe to power up laser weapons from smaller scale weapons (e.g. blasters, lightsabers) to super-scale intensity in the case of the Death Star. The Death Star's laser power works in a similar method to this by concentrating multiple light beams into one spot from where they combine into a single beam. This beam has been described as more powerful than usual because it can be used for the purpose of destroying/damaging solid objects such as drones and debris that it was compared to the lasers used by the Death Star.

In episode 236 of MythBusters, Adam Savage and Jamie Hyneman set out to test whether a person could dodge a blaster bolt fired by a stormtrooper. Adam was able to determine, based on examining footage from the Star Wars films, that the average speed of a blaster bolt was 130–135 mph (209–217 km/h). After building a pneumatic cannon to mimic a blaster and setting up a replica starship passageway, the team tested the myth by firing projectiles at each other from a distance of 40 feet to see if they could be dodged. The myth was declared busted when neither participant proved capable of dodging the shots, explaining that the limitations of human reaction time made it impossible to do so.

== Influence ==
One prop of Han Solo's blaster was expected to sell at auction for US$200,000–300,000, and another for $500,000.

The American Air Force Research Laboratory is currently working on long-term developments of aerial laser weapons. Their aim is to make fighter aircraft laser capable by the year 2030. The laser cannons use the same concept of ion-based technology as seen in Star Wars.

The United States Navy has begun to induct laser weapons in its fleet since late 2014. The weapons will be used for both sea-to-air and sea-to-sea purposes.

Israeli company Rafael Advanced Defense Systems claimed in 2014 that it is close to developing laser shields named Iron Beam, which a company spokesman compared by similarity to the lasers of Star Wars. The company claims that Iron Beam can deflect drones, missiles, rockets and mortars.

In a similar development, Chinese scientists produced laser guns that can disable the sensors of missiles, satellites and other sensor equipped devices. The guns are expected to be used by the Chinese military in future warfare and have been compared to Star Wars laser guns.

== See also ==
- List of Star Wars weapons
- Raygun
- Weapons in science fiction
- Star Wars expanded universe

== Bibliography ==
- Barr, Tricia; Bray, Adam; Horton, Cole; Horton (2017). Star Wars: The Visual Encyclopedia. United States: DK Publishing. ISBN 978-1-4654-5962-6.
- Barr, Patricia; Bray, Adam; Jones, Matt; Horton, Cole; Wallace, Daniel; Windham, Ryder (2019). Ultimate Star Wars New Edition. United States: DK Publishing. ISBN 978-1-4654-7900-6.
- Dougherty, Kerrie; Fry, Jason; Hidalgo, Pablo; Reynolds, David West; Saxton, Curtis; Windham, Ryder (2020). Star Wars Complete Vehicles New Edition. United States: DK Publishing. ISBN 978-0-7440-2057-1.
- Luceno, James; Reynolds, David West; Windham, Ryder; Fry, Jason; Hidalgo, Pablo (2018). Star Wars: The Complete Visual Dictionary. United States: DK Publishing. ISBN 978-1-4654-7547-3.
- Lund, Kristin; Beecroft, Simon; Dougherty, Kerrie; Luceno, James; Fry, Jason (2016). Star Wars: Complete Locations. United States: DK Publishing. ISBN 978-1-4654-5272-6.
- Walker, Landry Q. (2018). Star Wars Encyclopedia of Starfighters and Other Vehicles. United States: DK Publishing. ISBN 9781465482716.
- Windham, Ryder (2019). Star Wars TIE Fighter Owner's Workshop Manual. United States: Insight Editions. ISBN 978-1-68383-527-1.
- Windham, Ryder (2018). Star Wars YT-1300 Millennium Falcon Owner's Workshop Manual. United States: Insight Editions. ISBN 978-1-68383-528-8.
