= Tantive IV =

Fictional Star Wars spaceship

- Star Wars vehicle
- CR90 Corellian Tantive IV Alderaan Diplomatic Envoy used by Leia Organa as her personal Consular ship
- First appearance: Star Wars: From the Adventures of Luke Skywalker (1976)
- Based on: CR70 Corellian Corvette

Information
- Affiliation: Royal House of Alderaan (consular security); Galactic Republic; Alliance to Restore the Republic; Resistance
- Launched: By 22 BBY
- Decommissioned: 35 ABY, Exegol (Canon); 0 BBY, destroyed over Tatooine (Legends)
- Captain: Raymus Antilles
- Combat vehicles: 3 fighters (external mounting)
- Auxiliary vehicles: 1 shuttle (ventral bay); 4 12-passenger escape pods; 8 4-passenger escape pods

General characteristics
- Class: CR90 corvette
- Registry: Corellian Engineering Corporation
- Armaments: 2 dual anti-ship turbolasers; 4 single anti-fighter turbolasers; 1 tractor beam projector (optional)
- Defenses: Shield generators Ceramic hull plating
- Maximum speed: 950 km/h (atmosphere)
- Propulsion: Class 2-CEC Subspace Hyperdrive; 11 Ion Turbine (Drive Overcharged sublight drive assembly)
- Length: 126 metres (413 ft)
- Height: 49 metres (161 ft)
- Population volume: 165-300: 200-600 passengers; 3000 metric tons of cargo; 1 year's worth of consumables

The Tantive IV Alderaan Diplomatic Envoy /ˈtæntɪˌvi fɔːr/ (also referred to by its model as the CR90 Corellian corvette or simply as the Rebel Blockade Runner) is a fictional spaceship in the Star Wars film series. Designed by the Corellian Engineering Corporation (CEC), the highly modified CR90 corvette is designed to be utilitarian, durable, modular, similar to its predecessors like the CR70 with its simple interiors featuring subtle luxury for Alderaan officials. It was used by Leia Organa in the original Star Wars film (Note: Later titled Star Wars: Episode IV – A New Hope) and was the first vessel audiences saw when Star Wars premiered in 1977. Other CR90 Corellian corvettes, which share the Tantive IV's design, appear in Return of the Jedi and in the Star Wars Expanded Universe's books, comics, TV series, and games. A ship of similar design to the Tantive IV also appears in the sequel trilogy film Star Wars: The Rise of Skywalker (2019).

== Origin and design ==
The ship's design stems from initial concepts for the Millennium Falcon. When Space: 1999 (1975–1977) featured a ship called an Eagle Transporter with an appearance similar to the Industrial Light & Magic's Falcon design, the model makers redesigned the Falcon and adapted the initial design for the Tantive IV. The revised model was scaled down, with replacements for outsized components and a different cockpit. This also explains the 194-centimeter model's intricacy, which would have been necessary for depicting the prominent Falcon. Although not visible in the original Star Wars film, modelmakers put a miniature nude centerfold in the cockpit's interior. The Tantive IV was the last model completed for the film. A smaller 16-inch model was also made for the shot of the craft receding into the distance. A separate model was needed for this because of the limited length of the Dykstraflex track used. That model has lights for the eleven engines to give the illusion of exhausts. The miniature model was in the collection of Grant McCune until he died in 2010 and it was then sold at auction in 2015 for a record sum of $450,000.

The model was altered slightly for Return of the Jedi, with the addition of windows along the ship's spine and larger weapons. These modifications were removed in the 1990s. The Republic cruiser in Star Wars: Episode I – The Phantom Menace was designed to be reminiscent of the Tantive IV's shape.

== Depiction ==
The Imperial I-class Star Destroyer Devastator chases the Tantive IV over Tatooine.

The ship started life as a CR90 named as Star of Alderaan, but was renamed in honor of diplomats from Tantive IV who visited Alderaan.

The final scenes of Rogue One depict the plans for the Empire's Death Star battle station reaching the Tantive IV with Leia on her journey to Tatooine. According to the film's novelization, the ship was docked for repairs aboard Admiral Raddus' MC75 Star Cruiser Profundity, though it was intended to take a part in the Battle of Scarif. With the capture of the Profundity, the ship was forced to launch with partial repairs to protect the plans from Darth Vader. Although they were able to elude Vader initially, damage sustained during the escape allowed Vader's ship to disable and catch them above Tatooine.

The Tantive IV appears in the first scene of Star Wars as it is captured by the Imperial I-class Star Destroyer Devastator over Tatooine. Leia had taken the ship, alongside the plans, to Tatooine to recruit the Jedi Master Obi-Wan Kenobi to join the rebellion. Unable to find Kenobi, Leia gives the plans and a message to R2-D2, who escapes with C-3PO in an escape pod and lands on Tatooine.

Though the Tantive IV's ultimate fate was left unknown in Star Wars, according to the 1998 Star Wars Encyclopedia, the ship was subsequently destroyed by Darth Vader. This is now considered a part of the non-canonical Legends timeline.

The ship appears in The Rise of Skywalker as the center of the Resistance's base and during the final battle on Exegol as part of the Resistance's initial attack fleet. Prior to the events of the film, it was discovered in a state of disrepair decades after the Battle of Yavin by a former Imperial senator in the Yarma system. The senator, who was sympathetic to Leia's cause, repaired the vessel and returned it to her as a gift. The ship and its pilot, Nien Nunb, were hit by Darth Sidious' Force lightning assault. According to Rae Carson, author of the film's novelization, Nunb died mid-battle.

== Name ==
The ship was initially referred to as the "Rebel blockade runner", and National Public Radio's radio adaptation of Star Wars in 1981 reveals the name "Tantive IV" (pronounced 'Tan-tiv-ee four'). Star Wars Expanded Universe material initially referred to the class of ships as "Corellian corvettes", but Lucasfilm later identified them as Alderaan Cruisers. The name Tantive IV was used in various merchandise as well as the official Rogue One novelization. The name may be derived from the term tantivy, referring to a rapid gallop or blaring of horns, associated with the sport of fox hunting, suggesting the Tantive IV's role in the early scenes of A New Hope as the hunters' quarry.

== Games and models ==
Both Decipher, Inc. and Wizards of the Coast published Tantive IV and Corellian corvette cards for the Star Wars Customizable Card Game and Star Wars Trading Card Game, respectively.

A small Lego model of the Tantive IV is included with the Ultimate Collector series 3,000-piece Star Destroyer which, at the time of its 2002 release was Lego's largest set. Lego's 1,700-piece Ultimate Collector series blockade runner model, released in 2001, was the first set to include dark red bricks. In 2019, to celebrate the 20th anniversary of such models, Lego released an updated model of the Tantive IV .

Two Micro Machines three-packs included a Corellian corvette toy, and Hasbro's Collector Fleet line included an electronic blockade runner.

Kenner's Die Cast Star Destroyer from 1979 includes a miniature Tantive IV that can be inserted into a docking bay under the Star Destroyer.

The Tantive IV also appears as a ship model in both the X-Wing miniatures game and Star Wars Armada produced by Fantasy Flight Games. A 16-inch (410 mm) miniature of the Tantive IV sold at auction for $450,000, making it the most expensive Star Wars item sold at auction.
