= List of Star Wars spacecraft =

The following is a list of starships, cruisers, battleships, and other spacecraft in the Star Wars films, books, and video games.

Within the fictional universe of the Star Wars setting, there are a wide variety of different spacecraft defined by their role and type. Among the many civilian spacecraft are cargo freighters, passenger transports, diplomatic couriers, personal shuttles and escape pods. Warships likewise come in many shapes and sizes, from small patrol ships and troop transports to large capital ships like Star Destroyers and other battleships. Starfighters also feature prominently in the setting.

Many fictional technologies are incorporated into Star Wars starships, fantastical devices developed over the millennia of the setting's history. Hyperdrives provides for faster-than-light travel between stars at instantaneous speeds, though traveling uncharted routes can be dangerous. Sublight engines allow spacecraft to get clear of a planet's gravitational well in minutes and travel interplanetary distances easily. For travel within planetary atmospheres or for taking off and landing, anti-gravity devices known as repulsorlifts are used. Other gravity-manipulation technologies include tractor beams to grab onto objects and acceleration compensators to protect passengers from high g-forces. Protective barriers called deflector shields defend against threats, while many ships carry different types of weaponry.

== Spacecraft appearing in the original trilogy ==
=== Death Star ===
The Death Star is the Empire's battle station which has the ability to use a kyber-crystal powered laser to destroy entire planets. It appears throughout the Star Wars franchise, particularly the original trilogy.

=== Executor (Executor-class Star Dreadnought) ===
The Executor serves as Darth Vader's flagship during the events of The Empire Strikes Back, leading the Death Squadron against the Rebel Alliance on Hoth and in pursuit of the Millennium Falcon. It features again in Return of the Jedi where, during the final space battle, it is destroyed after an RZ-1 A-wing crashes into the command bridge, causing the Executor to lose control and be destroyed as the second Death Star's gravity pulls the flagship into its surface.

For The Empire Strikes Back, George Lucas wanted the Executor to be so massive it made the previous Star Destroyers appear tiny. A six-foot model of the Executor was constructed which had over 150,000 individual lights in it. According to chief model maker Lorne Peterson, the ship was originally scaled to appear 16 miles long, though later sources would amend this figure to almost 12 miles.

According to in-universe Star Wars sources, the Executor is the lead ship of a new class of Star Dreadnoughts; the term "Super Star Destroyer" is a colloquialism applied to any ship larger than a standard Imperial Star Destroyer. At 19,000 m (62,000 ft) long, the ship bristles with thousands of turbolasers, ion cannons, missile launchers and tractor beams. It similarly carries more than a thousand ships, including TIE fighters.

=== Home One (MC80 Mon Calamari Star Cruiser) ===
Home One
- First appearance: Star Wars: Return of the Jedi (1983)

Information
- Affiliation: Rebel Alliance
- Made by: Mon Calamari Shipyards

General characteristics
- Class: Star Cruiser
- Armaments: Turbolasers (29); Ion cannons (18); Tractor beam projectors (6)
- Defenses: Deflector shield generators; Armor hull plating
- Propulsion: Sublight ion engines; Hyperdrive
- Length: 1,300 m (4,300 ft)
- Population volume: 5,402 (included 246 specialist gunners)

Home One made its theatrical appearance in Return of the Jedi as Admiral Ackbar's flagship during the Battle of Endor.

According to the old Expanded Universe (now Star Wars Legends) material, the origin of the Mon Calamari Star Cruiser comes following the Galactic Empire's occupation of their homeworld of Mon Cala. After the Empire destroyed three floating cities to pacify the planet, the peaceful Mon Calamari converted their passenger liners and deep space exploration cruisers into warships, driving off the Imperials prior to the Battle of Yavin.

In the current canon storyline, Darth Vader successfully subjugates Mon Cala, leading to a mass exodus of city-ships from Mon Cala. This fleet would be commanded by Admiral Raddus and Admiral Ackbar and eventually join the Rebel Alliance.

The franchise's books, comics, and video games from Legends describe and depict other Mon Calamari cruisers and successor designs, such as the MC80B Mon Remonda in the Star Wars: X-wing novels, the MC90 star cruiser Galactic Voyager, the Mediator-class battle cruisers, and Viscount-class Star Defenders (which were meant to be the answer to the Executor-class Super Star Destroyers) in R.A. Salvatore's Vector Prime. In the current Star Wars canon, other Mon Calamari cruiser designs include the MC75 Profundity and the MC85 Raddus.

Design and concept

Industrial Light and Magic (ILM) created two Mon Calamari cruiser designs: the cylindrical "flying cigar" Home One command ship and a "winged" model identified in the Expanded Universe as the Liberty. The "winged" model would have its wings removed and thrusters modified to portray another subtype. The ships were designed to be as aesthetically different from the Imperial Star Destroyers as possible, although the filming crew disliked the "pickle ships" due to the models' unflattering angles. Internal neon lights provided lighting, and detail was painted on by using the second Death Star model's exposed framework as a makeshift frisket. The model's design, as well as that of other Mon Calamari cruisers to appear in the film, was a collaborative effort between George Lucas, Nilo Rodis-Jamero, and Joe Johnston.

In-Universe History

As described in Star Wars reference material, the in-universe origin of Home One is as a deep space exploration ship constructed on Mon Cala, part of the MC80 line of Star Cruisers. Although no two Mon Calamari ships look exactly alike, all share the same elongated, bulbous form which makes them appear to have been grown rather than constructed. When the Mon Calamari join the Rebel Alliance, these ships are extensively modified with increased armoring, stronger shields, and more powerful weapons, such that they become a match for Imperial Star Destroyers.

With its heavy armor plates, triple-strength shields, and twenty hangar bays, Home One functions as both a battleship and carrier in addition to its role as flagship. Like other Mon Calamari cruisers, Home One originally included numerous water-filled passageways, but these are drained and modified so that non-amphibious species could make use of them. However, the ship's controls and displays are designed specifically for Mon Calamari physiology, requiring the command crew to be entirely Mon Calamari. The blisters that cover the ship in a seemingly haphazard manner contain various equipment such as sensor arrays or recessed weapon batteries. Some are actually detachable ships in their own right which can be used to attack or escape, although Admiral Ackbar prefers to keep them docked.

In Return of the Jedi (1983), Admiral Ackbar (Timothy M. Rose) leads the Rebels during the Battle of Endor from the flagship, earning it the moniker Headquarters Frigate. While other Mon Calamari cruisers like the Liberty are destroyed by the second Death Star's superlaser, Home One survives. Home One again acts as Ackbar's command vessel a year later when the Empire makes its last stand in orbit above Jakku and will, decades later, continue to serve as part of the Resistance fleet.

Cultural influence

A 1994 Micro Machines three-pack included a winged Mon Calamari cruiser toy, and a 1996 three-pack included the other variety. Hasbro in 2003 planned to release a Mon Calamari cruiser as part of its Action Fleet collection but they cancelled the line before producing it. Decipher and Wizards of the Coast published Mon Calamari cruiser cards for the Star Wars Customizable Card Game and Star Wars Trading Card Game, respectively. In 2006, Wizards of the Coast created a Mon Calamari Star Defender miniature as part of its Star Wars Miniatures Starship Battles game. Mon Calamari cruisers are player-controllable units in LucasArts' Empire at War real-time strategy. Fantasy Flight Games's Star Wars: Armada, a table top miniatures game released on March 27, 2015, adds several Mon Calamari cruisers to the Rebel side in the expansions, including the MC80 Home One, MC80 Liberty, MC75 Profundity, and MC30c Frigate.

=== Imperial landing craft (Sentinel-class landing craft) ===
Imperial landing craft (or Sentinel-class landing craft) were designed for the Special Edition release of Star Wars Episode IV: A New Hope and created entirely with CGI. However, they first appeared in products of the Star Wars: Shadows of the Empire multimedia campaign. According to in-universe sources, the primary mission for Sentinel-class craft is deploying Imperial military forces from orbit onto a planet, though it can be used for other missions including short-range scouting, cargo transport and close air support. Heavily armored and equipped with powerful deflector shields, Imperial landers carry eight laser cannons, two concussion missile launchers, two blaster cannons and an ion cannon turret. As a troop transport it can carry 54 stormtroopers into battle, or carry vehicles via cargo pod installed on its underside.

=== Imperial shuttle (Lambda-class shuttle) ===
Lambda-class T4a shuttles first appeared in Star Wars: Episode VI - Return of the Jedi, and were later added to the Special Edition release of The Empire Strikes Back. Joe Johnston, Ralph McQuarrie, and Nilo Rodis-Jamero borrowed elements from the skyhopper designed by Colin Cantwell for A New Hope when refining the shuttle's appearance. Earlier versions were boxy, boat-like, or had TIE fighter-like components. Industrial Light and Magic's modelmakers made two shooting models, although CGI versions were used for the craft's Special Edition appearance in The Empire Strikes Back. The Theta-class shuttle in Revenge of the Sith was designed to appear like a predecessor to the Lambda class. A Lambda-class shuttle makes a cameo appearance during the docking sequence of Inara Serra's shuttle in "Serenity", the pilot episode of Joss Whedon's Firefly.

According to reference material, Lambda-class shuttles are one of the most common vessels in the Imperial navy and can be configured for a number of roles, including cargo transport, troop carrier, or diplomatic courier. It is a popular personal transport for high-ranking Imperial officials as its armament, reinforced hull and deflector shielding allow it to travel safely even without an escort. It was also rumored by Imperial officials that the Emperor himself used a highly modified Lambda-class shuttle, which was allegedly equipped with a cloaking device. The shuttle is propelled by two ion engines while a hyperdrive allows for long-distance journeys. At 20 m (66 ft) long, the shuttle can carry up to 20 passengers in standard configuration or up to 80 metric tons (176,370lbs) of cargo. A crew of two to six pilot the shuttle in a forward cockpit, which in an emergency can jettison from the main body of the vehicle; not all 20 passengers can fit in the cockpit however, so the most senior personnel are given priority to escape. For armament the Lambda-class shuttle is equipped with two Taim & Bak KX5 double blaster cannons on the folding wings, two forward-mounted Taim & Bak GA-60s double laser cannons, and a rear-mounted ArMek R-Z0 retractable double blaster cannon.

=== Imperial Star Destroyer ===
The Imperial-class Star Destroyers make their first theatrical appearance in the Star Wars (1977) and feature throughout the franchise. They are described as the chief warship of the Galactic Empire and act as the mobile headquarters for many high-ranking Imperial officers. Nearly 1,600 m (5,200 ft) long, these ships feature heavy armament, carry dozens of vessels including TIE Fighters, and transport thousands of Stormtroopers as they hunt down Rebel targets and instill fear in the civilian populace. However, at the Battle of Endor, they prove vulnerable to fleets of skilled Rebel pilots. The Force Awakens (2015) showcases the Graveyard of Ships on Jakku, described as the final resting place for many Imperial Star Destroyers when the Empire made their last stand against the New Republic.

=== Millennium Falcon (YT-1300 light freighter) ===
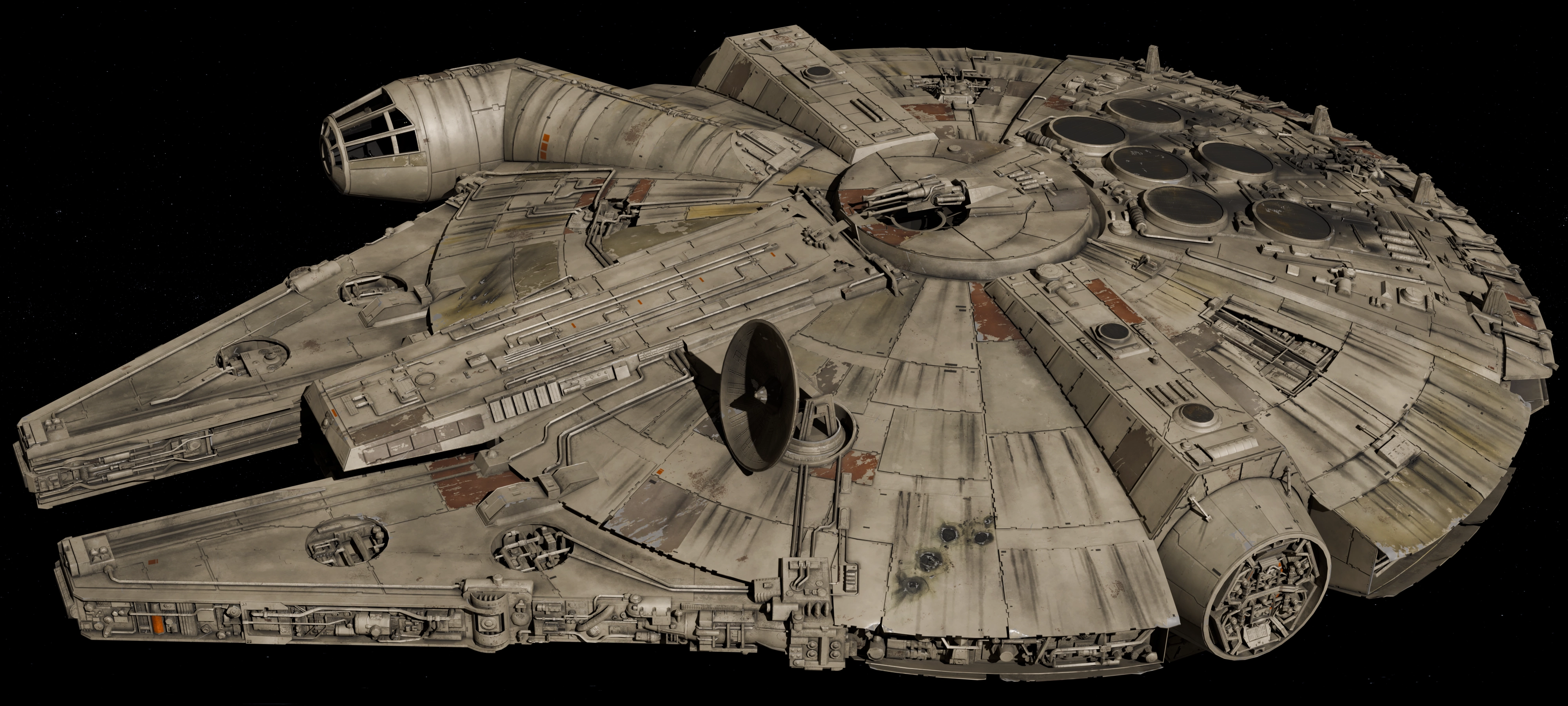
Millennium Falcon

The Millennium Falcon is a highly modified YT-1300F light freighter captained by smuggler Han Solo (Harrison Ford) & his Wookiee first mate, Chewbacca (Peter Mayhew).

The YT-1300 Corellian light freighter, manufactured by the Corellian Engineering Corporation, was designed to haul large container ships, akin to a giant forklift []. The vessel is known for its modular design and its ability to transform with modifications and alterations. The cockpit is located on the right side of the vessel, which makes it difficult to pilot. The YT-1300's popularity among freighter captains throughout the galaxy guaranteed its commercial operation throughout the final days of the Galactic Republic and the reign of the Galactic Empire.

=== Rebel Medical Frigate (Nebulon-B frigate) ===
Luke Skywalker (Mark Hamill) receives a prosthetic hand aboard the Redemption, a modified Nebulon-B escort frigate, at the conclusion of Star Wars: Episode V – The Empire Strikes Back. A Nebulon-B medical frigate is part of the Rebel Alliance fleet at the Battle of Endor in Return of the Jedi. Expanded Universe material states that relatively affordable Nebulon-B frigates, which are effective at engaging starfighters, are used by both the Rebellion and the Galactic Empire, but gained more fame under Alliance usage. The frigates appear in several LucasArts titles, including the X-Wing flight simulators series, Empire at War real-time strategy game, and Star Wars: Battlefront, as well as episodes "Zero Hour" and "Secret Cargo" of Star Wars Rebels.

Industrial Light & Magic's Nilo Rodis-Jamero and Joe Johnston created the frigate late during work on The Empire Strikes Back, with the design following a suggestion by George Lucas that it be based on an outboard motor. The model was produced in a short time with limited financial access; it was primarily built from components left over from previous kitbashing exercises, including battleship hulls and artillery pieces. The resulting model was 247 centimetres (97 in) long, 99 centimetres (39 in) tall, and included a "window" where a still from the scene in the medical bay could be inserted for filming.

Following the completion of filming, Lucas decided to revisit the end of the movie to better establish the characters' final locations, requiring a section of the frigate to be built that corresponded to the scale of the 2-foot (0.61 m) Millennium Falcon model. The model was originally referred to as the Rebel starcruiser or Rebel cruiser, but during filming of Return of the Jedi, it was renamed Rebel Medical Frigate after the cruiser name was used for the Mon Calamari cruisers.

According to in-universe sources, the EF76 Nebulon-B escort frigate is a versatile design which can be modified to fulfill a variety of different roles, from long-range scouting to search-and-rescue missions. When fully armed, the 300 m (980 ft)-long frigate is equipped with twelve turbolasers, twelve laser cannons, and a pair of tractor beam projectors, and can carry a full squadron of starfighters. The design is most famous for serving as medical frigates, with full-service hospital facilities and a capacity for 700 patients.

=== Rebel Transport (GR-75 medium transport) ===
GR-75 medium transports are a class of ship which first appears in The Empire Strikes Back during the evacuation of Echo Base on Hoth, and have made appearances in other media. Only 90 m (300 ft) long, these ships are described in Star Wars sources as largely consisting of a thick outer hull with its interior entirely open for modular cargo pods. These are held in place by a magnetic shield and allows the transport to accommodate 19,000 metric tons (42,000,000 lb) of cargo. Cheap and easy to maintain, these transports are only equipped with four twin laser cannons and minimal deflector shields, though some are retrofitted for combat.

=== Slave I (Firespray-31) ===
Design and concept

Slave I is the starship used by bounty hunter Boba Fett (Jeremy Bulloch) in The Empire Strikes Back and The Mandalorian (in which Boba is played by Temuera Morrison), and by his father Jango Fett (also played by Morrison) in Attack of the Clones. The ship's design is said to resemble the shape of a street lamp. However, the actual inspiration for the shape of the ship was a radar dish, according to Nilo Rodis-Jamero, the assistant art director and visual effects creator on The Empire Strikes Back. Rodis-Jamero created the initial design after seeing Joe Johnston's ideas for Boba Fett, and states that "the original design I had was round, but when you looked at it from the side, it became elliptical...George [Lucas] thought it was elliptical, so that's what it became." He goes on to say that "[w]hen building the ship at ILM, someone looked at the street lamps and pointed out that they looked like Boba's ship. So everyone began to think that was where I got the idea for the design." Its appearance in the original release of The Empire Strikes Back was realized by a combination of matte paintings and a 69-centimeter (27 in) model.

Description

According to in-universe reference material, Slave I is a modified Firespray-31-class patrol craft produced by Kuat Systems Engineering. Unique in design, the Firespray-31-class has a distinct engine cluster on which the ship rests when landed, but when in flight the ship rotates 90 degrees so that the top-mounted cockpit faces forward. The ship's artificial gravity similarly reorients depending on the flight mode, while the rotating stabilizer fins on either side carry repulsorlifts to assist with landing. The class only saw limited production, as it was considered too heavily armed for civilian use, too underpowered for Kuat's home fleet, and too reliable for post-sale maintenance business. Jango Fett chose the vessel for, among other reasons, its anonymous appearance, but heavily modified it with additional weaponry, expanded crew quarters and more secure (and less humane) prisoner cabinets.

After inheriting Slave I from his father, Boba Fett made additional modifications to the vessel. These include a secret (and stolen) military sensor-jamming and cloaking device that enables the ship to disappear from most sensor systems, immobilizing bunks for up to six prisoners, and even more weaponry. Armaments include 2 Borstel GN-40 twin rotating blaster cannons, 2 Dymek HM-8 concussion missile launchers, a Brugiss C/In ion cannon, a Phylon F1 tractor beam projector, and 2 Arakyd AA/SL proton torpedo launchers.

Cultural influence

In June 2021, the name Slave 1 was dropped by Disney and instead the vessel was referred to simply as "Boba Fett's Starship", starting with the introduction of a new LEGO model set. Jens Kronvold Frederiksen and Michael Lee Stockwell of LEGO Star Wars confirmed this change had come from Disney although no reason was given. Ethan Anderston of /Film theorized the decision might have been due to Disney not wanting to merchandize products with the word "slave" in them. Although questioning such a decision, he noted it was not the first time LEGO had not called their models after their proper names. A day after this reveal, a petition was started on Change.org to rename the ship back to its original name; within the first two days it had received over 1,500 digital signatures. Mark Anthony Smith, the actor who stood in as Boba Fett for the Special Edition version of Star Wars: A New Hope, also voiced his displeasure at the name change. In episode 4 of The Book of Boba Fett, the ship is referred to as "Firespray" by Boba Fett (Temuera Morrison), representing the first live-action mention of its new name. Joshua Fox of Screen Rant noted it made sense that Disney would not want the series' principal character's ship to have a name with negative connotations. He also noted they had done something similar in 2016 when they renamed the "Slave Leia" outfit to "Huttslayer."

=== Tantive IV (Rebel Blockade Runner) ===
The Tantive IV, identified in source material as a CR90 Corellian corvette, first appears in the opening scene of the original Star Wars: Episode IV - A New Hope, commanded by Princess Leia (Carrie Fisher) as she tries to escape from Darth Vader (David Prowse/James Earl Jones) aboard his Imperial Star Destroyer. Her adoptive father Bail Organa (Jimmy Smits) is seen using a similar vessel during the prequel movie Revenge of the Sith, identified in source material as the CR70 model Tantive III. Corellian corvettes, also known as Rebel Blockade Runners for their powerful engine array and ability to outrun customs vessels, are manufactured by the Corellian Engineering Corporation.

== Spacecraft appearing in the prequel trilogy ==
=== Banking Clan Frigate (Munificent-class Star Frigate) ===
Also known as Separatist Frigates, these vessels made their theatrical appearance in Star Wars: Episode III – Revenge of the Sith and feature in Clone Wars-related media. The design of these and other Separatist vessels was done specifically to reverse the visual iconography of the original Star Wars trilogy by having "good guy" ships be triangular and "bad guy" ships be smoother and more organic. Unused Joe Johnston designs of Rebel ships from Return of the Jedi were used as inspiration by Revenge of the Sith concept artists in creating the Banking Clan frigate and other vessels.

According to in-universe material, these Munificent-class Star Frigates are built by Hoersch-Kessel Drive Inc. on behalf of the InterGalactic Banking Clan for the Separatist cause. Forming the bulk of the Separatist fleet during the war, these frigates fill the dual role of combat and communications ships, using powerful antennae to coordinate fleet actions utilizing faster-than-light hyperwaves to communicate anywhere within the galaxy or jam enemy sensors and communications.

Official sources give their length as 825 m (2,707 ft), a width of 426 m (1,398 ft) and height of 243 m (797 ft). However they require only a small crew of 200 battle droids to operate, with a storage capacity of up to 150,000 additional battle droids for boarding actions or ground assaults. In battle, these frigates' armaments make them grossly overpowered for their size. Each is armed with two forward-facing heavy turbolaser cannons which at full power can blast-melt an ice-moon 1,000 km (620 mi) in diameter; two long-range ion cannons; 26 twin turbolaser cannons; 20 light turbolaser turrets; and 38 point-defense laser cannons.

=== Commerce Guild Support Destroyer (Recusant-class Light Destroyer) ===
These spacecraft made their theatrical appearance in Revenge of the Sith in addition to other Clone Wars-related media as a capital ship used by Separatist forces. As with other Separatist spacecraft, the design of these destroyers was based on unused concept art for Rebel capital ships from Return of the Jedi.

Officially referred to as Recusant-class light destroyers in background material, their in-universe origin comes from Mon Calamari plans that were stolen by Quarren Separatists and jointly manufactured by the Commerce Guild and Techno Union. These ships measure 1,187 m (3,894 ft) long, 157 m (515 ft) wide and 163 m (535 ft) high. Because they are primarily controlled via droid brain, they require a crew of only 300 battle droids to operate, with storage space for an additional 40,000 battle droids. Their diverse armament includes a prow heavy turbolaser cannon, 4 heavy turbolaser cannons, 6 heavy turbolaser turrets, 5 turbolaser cannons, 30 dual laser cannons, 12 dual light laser cannons, and 60 point-defense light laser cannons. However their effectiveness in battle comes from overwhelming numbers, as between four and six Recusant-class ships are needed to outgun a Venator Star Destroyer. Their only true weakness is the single-minded nature of their droid brain, although the lack of self-preservation means they are not above deliberately ramming their target in order to destroy it.

=== Dooku's solar sailer ===
Darth Tyranus, also known as Count Dooku (Christopher Lee), reaches Coruscant near the end of Star Wars: Episode II – Attack of the Clones aboard a Punworcca 116-class interstellar sloop, better known as a "solar sailer", built by the Huppla Pasa Tisc Shipwright Collective. The ship, which also appears multiple times in Star Wars: The Clone Wars, is equipped with a solar sail which was originally part of the concept for the Naboo royal starship in Star Wars: Episode I – The Phantom Menace. However the model was redesigned to reflect the harsher environment of Geonosis and the insectoid Geonosians, resembling both a beetle and a butterfly. Originally it was to have separate pilot and passenger compartments, but during production this was altered and a forward cockpit bubble was added when it was determined there was a need for a shot of Dooku sitting next to his pilot. It is somewhat similar to the private Antonov An-2 plane in real life. During filming of Attack of the Clones, a full-size model of the sailer was built in order to stage the lightsaber duel between Count Dooku and Yoda (Frank Oz).

According to Star Wars canon sources, the solar sailer is a luxurious yacht commissioned by Dooku from his allies on Geonosis prior to the outbreak of the Clone Wars. While only 16.7 m (55 ft) long, it is surprisingly spacious with room for Dooku's databook library and fast with a Class 1.5 hyperdrive. Instead of carrying fuel, the sailer deploys a 100 m (330 ft) wide sail which collects interstellar energy and channels it directly to the engines. To defend itself from attack, the vessel is equipped with eighty-four tractor/repulsor beam projectors.

=== H-type Nubian yacht ===
Padmé Amidala and Anakin Skywalker travel to Naboo aboard a H-type Nubian yacht in Attack of the Clones. The transport's design is partly based on an ocean liner.

=== Invisible Hand (Providence-class carrier/destroyer) ===
General Grievous's flagship in Revenge of the Sith is the Invisible Hand, appearing in the film's opening space battle above the planet Coruscant. With Supreme Chancellor Palpatine (Ian McDiarmid) held prisoner aboard the ship, Jedi Knights Obi-Wan Kenobi (Ewan McGregor) and Anakin Skywalker (Hayden Christensen) launch a rescue mission to save him, boarding the ship where they confront and ultimately defeat Count Dooku (Christopher Lee). With the Invisible Hand crippled in the battle, General Grievous flees aboard an escape pod as Anakin and Obi Wan successfully guide half the ship to an emergency landing on Coruscant.

George Lucas had a personal hand in the design of the ship, including the addition of the raised spire in which Obi-Wan, Anakin and Count Dooku have their duel. The raised spire also helped differentiate the command ship from the other capital ships over Coruscant. While the ship was completely CGI, unlike similarly modeled ships for the film it needed a complex interior that was fully mapped out for the various set pieces which take place during the movie. Once the floor plans were approved, they were constructed as both CG and actual rooms, with multiple large-scale sets for the actors to perform in. More sets of rooms aboard the ship were built than seen in the final film; several "serial-type escapades" were cut from the final release. Other sets, built inside a mount that could rotate them, were used to depict the vessel's collapse.

The Invisible Hand is described according to in-universe references as a Providence-class carrier/destroyer, a classification representing the dreadnought's dual roles in planetary domination. Manufactured by the Free Dac Volunteers Engineering Corps, the vessel is 1,088 m (3,570 ft) long, 198 m (650 ft) wide and 347 m (1,138 ft) high. Given its size the Invisible Hand can store up to 1.5 million battle droids but only requires a crew of 600 to operate. The Invisible Hand can unleash tremendous damage with 14 quad turbolaser cannons, each of which at maximum output is equivalent to a magnitude-10 earthquake; 2 heavy ion cannons; 34 dual laser cannons; 12 point-defense ion cannons, and 102 proton torpedo launchers. Its hangars have been extensively modified from other Providence-class vessels, allowing the battleship to carry 120 fighters (a mixture of Vulture droids and Tri-fighters), 160 MTTs and 280 other ground vehicles including AATs, Hailfire droids and Homing spider droids. Providence-class ships are equipped with a main upper sensor tower and a secondary ventral sensor pod, but on the Invisible Hand the main communication/sensor pod is refitted into a lofty sanctum for Count Dooku from which he broadcasts spiritual propaganda to divide the galaxy.

=== Naboo Royal Cruiser ===
Also known as the Naboo Diplomatic Cruiser, this ship makes its theatrical appearance in the opening scene of Star Wars Episode II: Attack of the Clones. The ship is seen being escorted by Naboo N-1 starfighters, carrying Senator Padmé Amidala (Natalie Portman) to Coruscant for an important vote on the Military Creation Act. After coming to rest on a landing pad, the ship is blown up in an assassination attempt on Senator Amidala's life, though she escapes unharmed.

The ship's design was inspired by the B-2 Spirit stealth bomber. While the cruiser was entirely CGI, for filming purposes a full-size set of the landing pad was built for the actors with a digital matte painting inserted to create the background. Pyrotechnics were used in the filming of the scene, though the majority of the explosion was created with CGI by visual effects art director Alex Jaeger.

Background material on the Diplomatic Cruiser state that it was designed in the wake of the Invasion of Naboo to address shortcomings in the previous J-type 327 starship. Still unarmed and covered in shiny chromium plating, it is nevertheless faster and better shielded, with additional back-up drives in case the main Class 0.7 hyperdrive fails. At 39 m (128 ft) long, the vessel's spacious interiors are designed with comfort in mind for four VIPs, six bodyguards and a crew of five. The leading edge of its wing also feature four recharging sockets for N-1 starfighters to dock with the ship.

=== Naboo Royal Starship ===
The Naboo Royal Starship features prominently in Star Wars Episode I: The Phantom Menace as the ship that Queen Padmé Amidala (Natalie Portman), Obi-Wan Kenobi (Ewan McGregor) and Qui-Gon Jinn (Liam Neeson) use to escape from the Trade Federation blockade of Naboo. After arriving on Tatooine where they free young Anakin Skywalker (Jake Lloyd), the heroes continue aboard the Royal Starship to Coruscant, before finally using it to return to Naboo and free the planet from the Trade Federation's occupation in a climactic battle.

An early design depicted the ship powered by a solar sail; when Lucas called for a sleeker look, designer Doug Chiang drew inspiration from 1950s hood ornaments. According to Chiang, the design of the queen's ship was to exemplify Theedian technology the same way the Space Shuttle exemplified the power of technology in America. A thirty-inch, highly detailed model of the ship was built, then sliced into one-inch sections and scanned in order to create a digital model. To reduce the amount of CGI work on the film and get more realistic footage of the ship under natural lighting, a larger ten-foot model was also created for filming scenes of the ship when landed.

According to in-universe material, the Naboo Royal Starship was meant to be a visual representation of the glory of Naboo. A modified J-type 327 Nubian starship, the vessel's unique spaceframe was handcrafted by the Theed Palace Space Vessel Engineering Corp. and its decorative plating of royal chromium – reserved only for Naboo's monarch – was hand-polished and crafted by artisans. Lacking weaponry, the 76 m (249 ft)-long ship featured state-of-the-art deflector shields and a cohort of astromech droids to make emergency repairs. One drawback was that its high-performance T-14 hyperdrive, while easy to acquire on many civilized worlds, could be harder to find on more remote planets. After Senator Amidala's death, the ship is taken by Darth Sidious and given to Darth Vader to use as he sees fit. Vader retrofits the starship with an armament of ion charges and uses it following the destruction of the Death Star at the Battle of Yavin.

=== Naboo Star Skiff ===
Padmé Amidala travels to Mustafar aboard a Naboo star skiff in Star Wars: Episode III – Revenge of the Sith to confront Anakin Skywalker/Darth Vader (Hayden Christensen) after he turns to the dark side. Designer Ryan Church sketched the ship to appear "supercharged". Only the ship's boarding ramp was built full scale; some footage was altered from material used in Attack of the Clones. The ship is designed to be reminiscent of the "rocket ships" seen in pulp science-fiction.

=== Neimoidian Shuttle (Sheathipede-class transport shuttle) ===
Neimoidian shuttles first appear in The Phantom Menace and are seen throughout the prequel trilogy and Clone Wars television series. Their design is based on a Trade Federation landing ship, turned vertically and altered to be more insectoid and less symmetrical. They are also used by the other Separatist leaders, such as Nuvo Vindi and Wat Tambor. Star Wars lore refers to these vessels as Sheathipede-class transport shuttles built by the insect-like Charrian species, especially popular with the Neimoidians but used by many worlds associated with the Separatist cause. Intended for short-range diplomatic missions, these 20 m (66 ft)-long shuttles feature powerful communication arrays and are unarmed but can be modified for combat. Some also incorporate an automatic pilot, allowing for a more expansive passenger compartment. A heavily modified Sheathipede-class shuttle named the Phantom II was obtained by the Spectres during a mission to Agamar, as a replacement for the original Phantom following its destruction.

=== Republic Assault Ship (Acclamator-class assault ship) ===
Republic assault ships of the Acclamator-class first appear in Attack of the Clones. These ships, originally called "Jedi troop transports ", demonstrate a connection to the original trilogy's Star Destroyers through their triangular hulls. According to Star Wars reference material, these assault ships were built by Rothana Heavy Engineering to serve as the Republic's primary troop transport at the start of the Clone Wars, with a secondary offensive role in space battles. Their secret construction was initiated by Darth Sidious (Ian McDiarmid) under false orders from the Jedi High Council as part his plan to take control of the galaxy.

Republic assault ships measure at 752 m (2,467 ft) long, 460 m (1,510 ft) wide and 183 m (600 ft) in depth. With a crew of 700, they can carry up to 16,000 clone troopers and support personnel, along with heavy vehicles including LAAT gunships, AT-TE walkers and SPHA artillery. Unlike many other Star Wars vessels of similar size they can conduct both ground and water landings, allowing them to deploy troops and vehicles directly into battle. Their armament includes 12 quad turbolaser turrets, 24 laser cannons, and 4 heavy strategic missile/torpedo launchers. This weaponry allows them to conduct a range of orbital bombardments, from surgical strikes in support of ground forces to "Base Delta Zero" fleet bombardments which melt the upper crust of a planet's surface.

=== Republic Attack Cruiser (Venator-class Star Destroyer) ===
Republic attack cruisers, formally known as Venator-class Star Destroyers, made their first theatrical appearance in the opening space battle of Revenge of the Sith and have appeared throughout the Star Wars franchise. Described in-universe as large and powerful battleships of the Republic Navy, attack cruisers are 1,137 m (3,730 ft) long with a crew of 7,400 and powerfully armed with eight heavy dual turbolaser turrets, two medium dual turbolaser turrets, fifty-two point-defense laser cannons, four heavy proton torpedo launchers and six tractor beam projectors. A 500 m (1,600 ft)-long flight deck is built directly into the ship's prow with bow doors, allowing a quick exit for the vessel's complement of 420 starfighters, forty LAAT gunships and twenty-four AT-TEs. After the Republic's victory, these cruisers continued to serve under the Galactic Empire.

=== Republic Cruiser (Consular-class cruiser) ===
The Consular-class Republic Cruiser Radiant VII is the first vessel seen in The Phantom Menace. Jedi knights Qui-Gon Jinn (Liam Neeson) and Obi-Wan Kenobi (Ewan McGregor) travel aboard the Radiant VII on their mission to end the Trade Federation's blockade of the planet Naboo. After docking with the Federation's Droid Control Ship, the Radiant VII is destroyed to prevent the Jedi from escaping.

Originally, the Radiant VII was going to be sleek like most Old Republic ships depicted in the Star Wars prequel trilogy. However, Lucas suggested a design similar to the ships in the original trilogy; Doug Chiang and the Lucasfilm art department responded with a design similar to the Tantive IV model created for Star Wars Episode IV: A New Hope. Several antennae were added to focus attention to the cockpit during the opening sequence of The Phantom Menace. For filming the destruction of the Radiant VII, the crew built a gigantic seven-foot model and rigged it with pyrotechnics, around which was constructed a to-scale hangar. This use of practical special effects allowed for pieces of the exploding model to interact with the surrounding environment without having to utilize CGI resources.

Consular-class Republic Cruisers like the Radiant VII are "instantly recognizable throughout the galaxy" according to the Star Wars Databank. Built by the Corellian Engineering Corporation, these Republic Cruisers are generally unarmed and feature a red color scheme as a symbol of neutrality and "diplomatic immunity". At 115 m (377 ft) long, their features include strong deflector shields, three powerful Dyne 577 radial atomizer engines and a Longe Voltrans tri-arc CD-3.2 hyperdrive for faster-than-light travel. Underneath the bridge is an interchangeable diplomatic salon pod which can eject from the cruiser in an emergency. During the Clone Wars, many Republic Cruisers undergo the Charger c70 retrofit to become Republic Frigates. Slightly longer at 139 m (456 ft), these vessels are retrofitted with additional armor plating, a twin laser cannon and five twin turbolaser cannon turrets.

=== Scimitar (Sith Infiltrator) ===
Darth Maul pilots a Sith infiltrator, named Scimitar, in The Phantom Menace. Its design includes elements of the TIE interceptor and Lambda-class shuttle. The vehicle has been made into toys by Hasbro and Galoob and models kits by Lego and Ertl. The Scimitar is identified by in-universe sources as a heavily modified Star Courier manufactured by Republic Sienar Systems, supposedly designed by Raith Sienar himself under orders from Darth Sidious. Following Maul's presumed death during the Battle of Naboo, it was appropriated by Sidious and used during the Clone Wars and Galactic Civil War. The ship's distinctively long prow, giving it a length of 26.5 m (87 ft), houses an experimental full-effect cloaking device that can make it invisible on command. Beneath the invisibility field generator are storage compartments for probe droids, a speeder bike and other equipment. The Scimitar also incorporates an experimental high-temperature ion engine system which necessitates large radiator panels that fold inward for landings, and is well-armed with six low-profile laser cannons and a proton torpedo launcher.

=== Techno Union Starship (Hardcell-class Interstellar Transport) ===
Techno Union Starships made their theatrical appearance in Attack of the Clones during the Battle of Geonosis as the Separatist droid army attempts to hold off the clone troopers of the Galactic Republic. Background material on the ship class describes it as a common sight in the Star Wars universe, 220 m (720 ft) long with a Class 1 hyperdrive and six large rocket thrusters, but ineffective as a combatant with only two laser cannon batteries. Its lack of repulsorlifts gives it limited maneuverability within a planet's atmosphere and the large fuel stores for its rockets are a glaring weakness that can be exploited during the battle. Of the 286 Techno Union starships at the Battle of Geonosis, 169 escape.

=== Theta-class Shuttle ===
Emperor Palpatine (Ian McDiarmid) travels aboard a Theta-class shuttle in Revenge of the Sith. The ship was designed to appear like a predecessor to the Lambda-class shuttle. Only the shuttle's boarding ramp was built for filming. Reference material describes this shuttle from an in-universe perspective as being as being upgraded by the finest starship technicians in the galaxy to meet Emperor Palpatine's needs. These upgrades include far stronger protective shields than normal; two quad laser cannons and an aft laser cannon that can be controlled by a single pilot without the four optional crew members; sensor masks which make the shuttle appear empty to conventional scanners; and a hyperwave reflector like those used by the Jedi to provide instant communication across the galaxy. Originally manufactured by Cygnus Spaceworks, key design personnel would be lured to Sienar Fleet Systems, where they would design craft with similar configurations for the Empire in years to come.

=== Trade Federation battleship (Lucrehulk-class battleship) ===
Trade Federation Lucrehulk-class battleships appear in the Prequel trilogy and various other Star Wars media. Lucas called for these ships to have a "saucer" look with a distinct front and rear, achieved by placing the engines on one side of the ship and the antennae and docking bays on the other.

In The Phantom Menace a fleet of these ships enforces a blockade of the planet Naboo, one of which (identified in background material as the Vuutun Palaa) serves as the Droid Control Ship at the center of the movie's climactic battle. To capture the Droid Control Ship's destruction, a 1/800 scale model was created and blown up using specially designed pyrotechnic material to simulate a believably massive explosion, and filmed at 340 frames per second to get enough frames for the cut. A second scale model of the ship's hangar was created and mapped out for the scene where Anakin Skywalker (Jake Lloyd) accidentally flies his starfighter inside the ship.

In-universe, these vessels were originally Lucrehulk-class LH-3210 cargo freighters manufactured by Hoersch-Kessel Drive Inc. that the Trade Federation secretly modified into warships to build up their armed forces. At 3,170 m (10,400 ft) in diameter, each massive battleship can carry an entire army: 6,250 Armored Assault Tanks, 550 Multi-Troop Transports, 1,500 troop carriers, 50 C-9979 Landing Craft, 1,500 Vulture droids and over 329,000 B1 Battle Droids. The crew is similarly large with 60 supervisors, 3,000 droid crew and 200,000 maintenance droids. To destroy enemy starfighters trying to attack its transports, each converted battleship is equipped with 42 quad laser emplacements on rotating mounts to hide the ships' military nature. While helping to conceal the Trade Federations' military build-up, the limited coverage of these weapons leaves significant blind spots vulnerable to attack. A small number of these battleships are further modified as Droid Control Ships and featured additional communications and computer systems to operate the Trade Federation's droid armies; destroying a Droid Control Ship will disable all droids under its command.

During the Clone Wars, many Lucrehulk-class freighters are more extensively retrofitted to increase their armament over what was carried during the Battle of Naboo. These Separatist battleships had 185 quad laser batteries, 520 assault laser cannons, and 51 turbolasers. However, blind spots remain in the armament's coverage which leave vulnerable angles that Republic ships can exploit. After the end of the Clone Wars, Lucrehulk-class battleships are acquired by various groups, including the Rebel Alliance, which uses one as a flight school.

=== Trade Federation Landing Ship (C-9979 Landing Craft) ===
Trade Federation Landing Ships transport the Trade Federation's invasion forces to Naboo's surface in The Phantom Menace and have appeared in other Star Wars media. Although initial designs were reminiscent of dirigibles, the final design is based on a dragonfly. George Lucas likened the ship's similarity to a biplane. In addition to digital models, an eight-foot-wide scale model of the lander was built to film scenes of these craft landing on Naboo's surface. Another larger-scale model of the lander's doorway was built to film scenes of Trade Federation vehicles exiting the craft.

Formally known within the setting as a C-9979 Landing Craft, this vessel has an imposing wingspan of 370 m (1,210 ft) which is used to store a tremendous number of vehicles: 114 Armored Assault Tanks, 11 Multi-troop transports and 28 troop carriers. Deploying a full load of vehicles is a complex process which can take up to 45 minutes to complete as they exit the vessel via large deployment doors. These doors include perimeter field sensors which detect land mines and other hazards. Powerful tensor field generators bind the removable wings to the vessel while "repulsorlifts" keep them from sagging under their own weight. Manufactured for the Trade Federation by Haor Chall Engineering, the 210 m (690 ft)-long craft has a crew of 88 battle droids. In addition to piloting the landing craft and manning its weaponry, these droids also run maintenance and repair shops which service the onboard attack force. Another 361 battle droids can also be carried on board in storage. For self-defense the landing craft is equipped with deflector shields and is armed with two pairs of wingtip laser cannons and four turret-mounted laser cannons.

== Spacecraft appearing in the sequel trilogy ==
=== Anodyne (Nebulon-C Frigate) ===
The Anodyne is one of the Resistance capital ships which make their first theatrical appearance in Star Wars: The Last Jedi (2017). As with other Resistance ships, the Anodyne was meant to resemble an updated version of a previous ship, in this case the Rebel Medical Frigate. According to production designer Kevin Jenkins, such iterations are meant to evoke the developments that took place between the earlier Second World War & Korean War and the later Cold War.

As described in reference material, the Anodyne is a Nebulon-C frigate originally manufactured by Kuat Drive Yards to serve the New Republic. This line of ships fulfills the same roles as the previous Nebulon-B frigates but are much larger with a length of 549 m (1,801 ft), width of 195 m (640 ft) and height of 322 m (1,056 ft). As part of the Resistance fleet, the Anodyne acts as a hospital ship with surgical suites, intensive care units, medical laboratories and recovery wards. The conversion to this role left its military capabilities intact however, allowing it to carry a full wing of starfighters along with ten heavy turbolasers, six point-defense turrets, and two proton torpedo launchers. Thanks to modifications by Resistance engineers, the Anodyne is heavily automated, allowing a skeleton crew of 170 to operate it; such a small crew is easily transferred to the Raddus before the Supremacy destroys the ship.

=== Bestoon Legacy (WTK-85A interstellar transport) ===
The Bestoon Legacy was a WTK-85A interstellar transport that made its theatrical appearance in Star Wars: The Force Awakens, albeit in a flashback by Rey. The Bestoon Legacy was owned by a Sith assassin named Ochi of Bestoon, who was hired by Darth Sidious to kidnap Rey, due to her father Dathan being his son, so he could use her.

=== Eravana (Baleen-class heavy freighter) ===
The Eravana was a Baleen-class heavy freighter piloted by Han Solo and Chewbacca after losing the Falcon. Appearing in Star Wars: The Force Awakens, Han was smuggling three rathars, when two syndicates, the Guavian Death Gang and Kanjiklub, to whom Han was indebted.

=== Fulminatrix (Mandator IV-class Siege Dreadnought) ===
Making its theatrical appearance in Star Wars: The Last Jedi (2017), the Fulminatrix arrives at the planet D'Qar whilst the Resistance fleet attempts to evacuate from their base. In creating the vessel, design supervisor Kevin Jenkins revealed that he and director Rian Johnson went through several iterations in post-production before deciding on a design featuring big guns.

The Fulminatrix is stated by Star Wars sources to be a model of siege dreadnought manufactured for the First Order by Kuat-Entralla Engingeering. The vessel carries two orbital bombardment autocannons powerful enough to punch through planetary shields along with twenty-six dorsal point-defense turret, six tractor beam projectors, and TIE fighters. Its commander, Captain Moden Canady, is a veteran Imperial Star Destroyer captain described as appreciative of his youthful crew's fervor but dismayed by their inexperience. Although the Fulminatrix wipes out the Resistance base on D'Qar, it is destroyed by Resistance bombers before it can turn its autocannons on the fleet.

Joe Pappalardo of Popular Mechanics said the design of the Fulminatrix made a little more sense than the standard Imperial Star Destroyer by being more symmetrical with the removal of the superstructure. However, he argued that its delta wing shape still serves no purpose, and that its use of two cannons for bombardment gives it a restricted field of fire. A more sensible design he argues would be to use missiles or drones, as it would represent how the real world had moved on from powerful-but-inaccurate artillery to precision-guided munitions.

=== Raddus (MC85 Mon Calamari Cruiser) ===
Raddus
- First appearance: Star Wars: The Last Jedi (2017)

Information
- Affiliation: Resistance
- Made by: Mon Calamari Shipyards/Corellian Engineering Corporation

General characteristics
- Class: Star Cruiser
- Armaments: Heavy turbolasers (18); Heavy ion cannons (18); Point-defense laser turrets (12); Proton torpedo launchers (6)
- Defenses: Deflector shield generators; Durasteel hull plating; Sensor-jamming and stealth systems
- Propulsion: Sublight ion drives; Hyperdrive
- Length: 3,438 m (11,280 ft)
- Width: 707 m (2,320 ft)
- Height: 462 m (1,516 ft)
- Population volume: 1,139 (skeleton crew)

Origin and design

The Raddus was based on early Ralph McQuarrie drawings, being inspired by the cruisers appearing in Return of the Jedi but not an exact copy. As with the creation of the previous Mon Calamari cruisers, the organic design of the Raddus was meant to contrast with the rigidity of First Order ships.

Depiction

According to Star Wars literature, the Raddus was an MC85 Star Cruiser which was originally named the Dawn of Tranquility and served in the New Republic's home fleet. However, it was decommissioned early, partly as a cost-cutting measure, partly to conform to the disarmament treaties. When the Resistance acquires the ship, Admiral Gial Ackbar requests it be renamed in honor of Admiral Raddus who died during the Battle of Scarif. It serves as the mobile headquarters for General Leia and symbol of the Resistance's struggle against the First Order.

Reference material describes the MC85 line of Star Cruisers as being a collaborative effort between Mon Cala and Corellia to create ships more accommodating to non-amphibious species. Among the advanced technology incorporated into the design was an experimental deflector shield system, capable of absorbing immense damage which would destroy other vessels, along with both a primary command bridge and ventral emergency bridge. As they struggle to recruit enough organic beings, the Resistance has augmented their capital ships with increased automation so that their skeleton crews can effectively control them.

The Raddus serves as the flagship of the Resistance task force fleeing D'Qar as depicted in Star Wars: The Last Jedi (2017). When a First Order fleet, led by the Supremacy, successfully track them through hyperspace, the Resistance continues to flee in realspace. Under continual bombardment by the Supremacy, eventually only the Raddus remains of the task force, but with fuel running low a plan is hatched to escape aboard cloaked U-55 Orbital Loadlifters to nearby Crait. Unfortunately they are betrayed by DJ (Benicio del Toro) and, with the Supremacy firing on the helpless shuttles, Vice Admiral Amilyn Holdo (Laura Dern) decides to turn the Raddus around and ram the Supremacy at lightspeed. The resulting collision destroys the Raddus but also a significant portion of the First Order fleet as the Supremacy is split in two.

Analysis

Ben Lindbergh of The Ringer cites the hyperspace ramming scene with the Raddus (labeled the "Holdo maneuver") as the film's most indelible moment, but also its most controversial to the rest of the setting. "The Holdo maneuver is a little like the walker-guts gambit on The Walking Dead; the first time we saw characters slather themselves in zombie intestines and lurch through a horde undetected, it was thrilling, but every subsequent time that a character has faced a similar threat and hasn’t done that, we’ve wondered why." He relates the discussions this scene has elicited within the Star Wars fandom and the various theories to explain why the maneuver worked but hasn't been used elsewhere.

David Miller of Screen Rant also highlights the controversy of this scene and contrasts with earlier Star Wars Legends continuity, where in the comic Race for Survival the Executor was rammed by three Imperial Star Destroyers coming out of hyperspace and only suffered the loss of its shields. In The Rise of Skywalker it is stated that the Holdo maneuver only has a "one-in-a-million chance" of working, but Craig Elvy considers this an unsatisfactory explanation as it reduces Holdo's sacrifice to just "cheap, dumb luck."

Ben Hardwick of Comic Book Resources believes the explanation that makes the most sense for why the Holdo maneuver worked depends on the fact that within the Star Wars setting, hyperspace travel involves transitioning into an alternate dimension where ships can travel faster than the speed of light. In the brief window before making the transition, the ship would be traveling just below the speed of light. Thus Holdo timed the Raddus to ram the Supremacy at just the right moment.

=== Night Buzzard (Oubliette-class transport) ===
The Night Buzzard is an Oubliette-class transport used by the Knights of Ren as their primary mode of transportation.

=== Ninka (Free Virgillia-class Bunkerbuster) ===
The Ninka is one of the Resistance capital ships which make their first theatrical appearance in Star Wars: The Last Jedi (2017). According to production designer Rich Heinrichs, the ship was meant to resemble the earlier Rebel Blockade Runner as an update on the recognizable design.

Background literature describes the Ninka, originally commanded by Vice Admiral Holdo before she took command of the Resistance fleet, as part of a class of heavily armed corvettes manufactured by the Corellian Engineering Corporation. Measuring 316.05 m (1,036.9 ft) long by 242.53 m (795.7 ft) wide and 88.69 m (291.0 ft) high, it is meant to break through planetary sieges and other obstacles in order to destroy hardened ground targets. Towards this goal it carries additional armor plating to survive head-on attacks and is armed with two heavy turbolaser turrets, four point-defense turrets, three heavy plasma bombs with an explosive yield of 100 megatons, and eight heavy ordnance pods. As the Ninka only required a skeleton crew of 23 thanks to automation augmentation, they were all easily able to transfer to the Raddus before their ship was destroyed by the Supremacy.

=== Sith Star Destroyer (Xyston-class Star Destroyer) ===
Introduced in Star Wars: The Rise of Skywalker, the Xyston-class Star Destroyer, colloquially known as the Sith Star Destroyer, is a Star Destroyer variant built by the Sith Eternal's automated shipyards on the hidden planet of Exegol during and well after the Galactic Civil War. Outwardly, they resemble larger versions of the Imperial-I class used previously by the Galactic Empire, but were distinguished by an axial superlaser powered by bled kyber crystals, which was powerful enough to destroy a planet. These Star Destroyers also possessed hyperdrives and deflector shields, but were unable to activate either on Exegol due to its turbulent and electrically-charged atmosphere, and required a navigation signal from a navigation tower to leave the planet. Additionally, the superlaser was directly tied to the ship's reactor, resulting in the destruction of the entire ship if one or the other were destroyed.

=== Supremacy (Mega-class Star Dreadnought) ===
Introduced in Star Wars: The Last Jedi, the Supremacy, disparagingly nicknamed "Snoke's boudoir" is a Mega-class Star Dreadnought that served as the mobile capital of the First Order and the only ship of its line. Built at a staggering cost in the Unknown Regions, the existence of the Supremacy was a rumor to Resistance members until it finally revealed itself following the destruction of Starkiller Base. The Supremacy's wingspan measured at 60 km wide, making it the largest ship in galactic history and dwarfing even the Empire's Executor-class Star Dreadnoughts, and was able to dock up to eight Resurgent-class Star Destroyers at a time - two internally and six externally. The ship also had the fastest known hyperdrive rated at class 0.3 - faster than that of the Millennium Falcon, and was able to track ships through hyperspace with a hyperspace tracker.

=== U-55 Orbital Loadlifters ===
U-55 Orbital Loadlifters make their theatrical appearance in Star Wars: The Last Jedi (2017), being used by the Resistance to transport people and material. The shuttles' design was meant to suggest the rebel transports from The Empire Strikes Back but underwent a significant revision during the design process when director Rian Johnson thought it was too cluttered, stating "I need windows. It's a bus." Because of the window design a full-scale model of the shuttle was built, which could be split in half to accommodate filming. Production designer Kevin Jenkins specifically took inspiration from 2001: A Space Odyssey when designing the interior look of the shuttle because many of that film's art directors had also worked on the original Star Wars movie.

Star Wars sources describe U-55 Orbital Loadlifters as the latest in a line of versatile and reliable shuttlecraft found throughout the galaxy. Manufactured by Sienar Fleet Systems, U-55s measure 22.63 m (74.2 ft) long by 12.34 m (40.5 ft) wide and 5.15 m (16.9 ft) high. Each shuttle has a crew of two pilots, one engineer, and can carry up to 60 passengers. Being slow and unarmed, Resistance loadlifters are jury-rigged with a prototype baffler system designed by Rose Tico (Kelly Marie Tran), described as a "poor being's cloak" that was adopted throughout the fleet. This technology plays a central role in the Resistance's attempt to escape from the Raddus, but when they are betrayed and the shuttles detected, only six of the original thirty U-55s are able to reach Crait.

=== Vigil (Vakbeor-class Cargo Frigate) ===
The Vigil makes its theatrical appearance in Star Wars: The Last Jedi (2017) as one of the four capital ships making up the Resistance fleet. The ship is described in Star Wars literature as a cargo frigate, a hybrid design meant to haul goods while carrying a basic defensive package of four laser cannons and two tractor beam projectors. During the events of the film, the Vigil and its crew of twenty-six are commanded by Vice Admiral Joris and carries vital Resistance supplies. Unfortunately, the ship is never meant for serious battle, and it is quickly destroyed by the Supremacy as the Resistance flees D'Qar.

== Spacecraft appearing in other Star Wars media ==
=== Cantwell-class Arrestor Cruiser ===
The Cantwell-class Arrestor Cruiser is an Imperial cruiser class that made its first appearance in Solo: A Star Wars Story (2018) in a recruitment film and was intended to make a full appearance in the movie. The final cut did not include the scene and was included in home media releases as a deleted scene, with the craft not making a full appearance until the eleventh episode of the first season of Andor (2022), where one attempted to trap Luthen Rael's Fondor Haulcraft but it instead escaped using its countermeasures. The cruiser takes its name from Colin Cantwell, who initially pitched the designs for the Imperial-class Star Destroyer in Star Wars (1977), which were rejected in favor of its current design.

A joint commissioning by the Imperial Navy and Department of Imperial Justice, the Cantwell-class of ships are a type of patrol and detainment cruisers. Constructed by Kuat Drive Yards, they measure 1,363.13 m (4,472.2 ft) long, 667.42 m (2,189.7 ft) wide and 229.78 m (753.9 ft) high, bearing similarities to the Imperial-class Star Destroyer produced by the same company but with an inverted arrow-shaped hull. Their purpose is to use their triple tractor beam array to stop suspicious vessels from operating in restricted space. Once caught, the ships are kept in place until reinforcements arrive or their crews are taken into custody with the cruiser's holding bays. Three heavy turbolaser turrets and two ion cannons turrets provide backup for the array, as do TIE fighters and boarding craft deployed from two hangar bays.

=== Colossus (Trantor-class supertanker fuel depot) ===
The Colossus is a Trantor-class superfuel tanker depot that made its first appearance in Star Wars Resistance as the headquarters of the racing team Ace Squadron and was operated by Imanuel Doza, who served as a captain in the Galactic Empire before deserting around the Battle of Endor and later commandeering the Colossus. He operated a racing circuit from the Outer Rim ocean planet Castilon since at least 14 ABY, where it sat in its waters since and became a hub for traders, merchants, outlaws, and racing fans. The Colossus was occupied by the First Order after a series of pirate attacks secretly orchestrated by them, and was later retaken from them with the station emerging from the planet's oceans for the first time in over twenty years and activating its hyperdrive to escape. Doza joined the Resistance and committed his resources to their cause, including the Battle of Exegol against Darth Sidious' Final Order in which the Colossus and Ace Squadron participated in.

Constructed by Kuat Drive Yards for the Empire, the Trantor-class is a space station class that served as a mobile refueling depot. It was able to operate in both space and a planetary atmosphere, as well as being able to operate in water with the majority of the Colossus being submerged in Castilon's oceans except for its visible upper levels. It was also armed with turbolasers to defend itself, and it was equipped with engines and a class 2 hyperdrive to stay mobile. Another Trantor-class depot named the Titan was operated by the First Order which Ace Squadron, having reorganized as the Resistance cell Team Colossus, infiltrated to steal its trans-binary deflector to prevent the Colossus' inhabitants from being exposed to stellar radiation.

=== Dalkor Dagger (Novahawk-class assault transport) ===
The Dalkor Dagger was a modified Novahawk-class assault transport that appeared in Star Wars Resistance as the personal starship of Ax Tagrin.

=== Eye of Sion ===
The Eye of Sion is a large hyperspace transport ring that appeared in Star Wars: Ahsoka built by an Imperial remnant faction led by Nightsister and industrialist Morgan Elsbeth during the New Republic era with the intent of reaching the extragalactic planet Peridea and retrieving Grand Admiral Thrawn and his Imperial-class Star Destroyer Chimaera from exile and return him to the galaxy.

While functionally identical to the Clone Wars-era transport rings built for the Delta-7 and Delta-7B Aethersprite, Eta-2 Actis, V-19 Torrent, and V-wing starfighters previously used by the Jedi and Galactic Republic, the Eye of Sion is equipped with a hyperdrive system far more powerful than any known model in existence and was described by Huyang as the most powerful he ever saw. Powered by seven salvaged Super Star Destroyer-classed hyperdrive cores, it is capable of making extragalactic hyperspace jumps. The sheer power of all seven hyperdrive cores being activated was powerful enough to send shockwaves that devastated and disabled starships in its path as well as leaving a faint circular glow visible from multiple star systems away. The Eye is not completely defenseless, as it is armed with turbolaser cannons by the bridge and hyperdrive core clusters and carries a complement of two RP82 Fiend fighters piloted by mercenaries Shin Hati and Marrok.

=== Fondor Haulcraft (V-21.1 Chevlex light haulcraft) ===
The Fondor Haulcraft is a vessel which made its television debut during the first season of Andor (2022). It serves as the personal transport for Luthen Rael (Stellan Skarsgård), the Rebel spymaster referred to as "Axis" by the Imperial Security Bureau. In episode 11 of the first season, Luthen pilots the Fondor against a Cantwell-class Arrestor cruiser in what Erik Kain of Forbes called the best dogfighting sequence since Return of the Jedi. "[T]his dogfight was great not because it was the most epic or flashy or because it was a showdown between rivals with old scores to settle, but because it was a clever, expertly-crafted scene that did only what it set out to do and did it well." Showrunner Tony Gilroy explained how he worked with production designer Luke Hull and visual effects supervisor Mohen Leo to come up with the design of the ship, and how the writing for that scene in particular was a collaborative effort.

The Fondor Haulcraft, simply called "the Fondor" by Luthen, is stated by Star Wars literature to be a V-21.1 Chevlex light haulcraft originally made by Fondor Yards Commercial Ventures. The Axis network spymaster has heavily modified the craft to both increase its combat capability and maintain secrecy. This includes replacing all support crew positions with a Fondor droid intelligence whose memory is wiped after every mission. The vessel's navicomputer is also triple-encrypted with a cypher based on extinct languages to which only Luthen and Kleya Marki (Elizabeth Dulau) know the key. The Fondor can simulate system malfunctions convincingly enough to fool Imperial sensors while its engines are more powerful than the stock configuration. Among its offensive and defensive systems are a pair of rear-mounted ballistic chaff launchers, two forward laser cannons; a hidden dorsal laser cannon turret; retractable anti-personnel laser cannons; tractor beam projector; and two tandem continuous stream particle beam emitters.

=== Ghost (VCX-100 light freighter) ===
The Ghost is a starship which made its first appearance in the Star Wars Rebels television series. Owned and piloted by the gifted Twi'lek, Hera Syndulla (voiced by Vanessa Marshall), it serves as "home base" for a small band of Lothal rebels during the Age of the Empire. The Ghost makes a cameo appearance in Rogue One near the Great Temple of Massassi on Yavin 4. Its captain, Hera Syndulla, is briefly mentioned in the film, and its repair droid, Chopper, makes a brief appearance inside the Temple, and later participates in the Battle of Scarif. Han Solo (Alden Ehrenreich) pretends to own a spacecraft of the same model in Solo: A Star Wars Story, during the Sabacc game in which he first met Lando Calrissian (Donald Glover). The Ghost later participated in major decisive battles against the Empire and its successors, notably at Endor, Jakku, and Exegol, making a cameo appearance in The Rise of Skywalker as part of the civilian reinforcements recruited by Calrissian; it was briefly disabled when Darth Sidious attacked the fleet with Force lightning, but it was reactivated and survived the battle.

Reference material describes the Ghost as a modified VCX-100 light freighter, a model of starship produced by the Corellian Engineering Corporation. At 43.9 m (144 ft) long, the Ghost features a Class 2 hyperdrive and a maximum atmospheric speed of 1,025 km/h (637 mph). It has four cargo holds, one in each corner of the ship, and its armament includes a dorsal laser cannon turret with 360-degree rotation, two forward laser cannons in the nose turret, and two proton torpedo launchers. A short-range Corellian auxiliary starfighter named the Phantom doubles as the ship's third laser cannon turret when docked; its role was later filled by an extensively-modified Sheathipede-class shuttle named the Phantom II after the original was destroyed. The Ghost earns its name by carrying electronic countermeasures sufficient to evade Imperial sensors.

=== Halo (SS-54 assault ship) ===
The Halo is a starship owned by the bounty hunter Sugi. It made its first appearance in Star Wars: The Clone Wars 2008 series. Sugi often piloted the Halo with Seripas, a diminutive alien. In the Aftermath trilogy, the Halo was given to Sugi's niece Jas Emari.

=== Hammerhead corvette (Sphyrna-class corvette) ===
The Hammerhead corvette is a ship class introduced in Rogue One: A Star Wars Story, and was given a prominent role during the final space battle when one of these ships rammed a disabled Imperial Star Destroyer into another. Its CGI design was purposefully meant to be evocative of the Tantive IV from the original Star Wars film. The in-universe origin for Hammerhead corvettes, formally known as Sphyrna-class corvettes, is that they are an ancient line of ships built by the Corellian Engineering Corporation. Reliable and adaptable, these corvettes are 116.7 m (383 ft) long and armed with two forward and one rear dual laser cannons, but can be modified with additional sublight engines and add-on modules. They are used by the Rebel Alliance in many different roles: scout ships, tugs, transports, and even battleships.

Rhett Allain, an associate professor of physics at Southeastern Louisiana University, estimated in a 2017 article for Wired that the Hammerhead's engines in Rogue One would have had to generate 2×10^{11} (or 200 billion) Newtons of thrust to push the Star Destroyer: 6,000 times the amount of thrust force generated by a Saturn V rocket.

=== Hound's Tooth (YV-666 light freighter) ===
The Hound's Tooth is a starship owned by the bounty hunter Bossk. It made its first appearance in Star Wars Legends in the short story collection Tales of the Bounty Hunters. The craft made its first canon appearance in Star Wars: The Clone Wars. The Hound's Tooth also has an escape craft known as Nashtah Pup, a modified Z-95-AF4 Headhunter.

=== Imperial Freighter (Gozanti-class cruiser) ===
The term Imperial Freighter refers to a type of Gozanti-class cruiser, which first appeared as a background vessel in The Phantom Menace and has appeared in other Star Wars media, most notably the Star Wars Rebels television series. Reference material describes Gozanti-class cruisers as being manufactured by the Corellian Engineering Corporation and used by a variety of factions, but those in Imperial service have stronger deflector shields, quicker engines and better weaponry to deter pirates and rebels from stealing their cargo. In addition to a dorsal twin laser cannon turret and ventral heavy laser cannon turret, these 63.8 m (209 ft)-long ships can carry four TIE fighters via extendable docking clamps. Gozanti-class Assault Carriers are equipped with magnetic docking clamps that allow them to carry a pair of Walkers for planetary assaults. Another variant, the IGV-55 Surveillance Vessel, is equipped with multiple listening arrays, modified sensor-dampened engines, and a computer database to store billions of yottabytes of data. A shipyard custom-configured variant called the C-ROC (Configuration-Restored Operational Capacity) was sold by CEC to the civilian market as a mid-life upgrade, with one notable ship named the Broken Horn appearing in Rebels under the ownership of the Broken Horn Syndicate's leader Cikatro Vizago.

=== Imperial / Jedi Light Cruiser (Arquitens-class light cruiser) ===
The Arquitens-class light cruiser is a vessel which first appears in the 2008 Clone Wars television series as well as the Star Wars Rebels television series. Source material describes it as serving the Galactic Republic during the Clone Wars as a light warship, earning the nickname Jedi Light Cruiser. After the Republic's victory it continued to serve the Galactic Empire in the same capacity, though under the name Imperial Light Cruiser. Armed with four double-barrel turbolaser batteries and four quad laser turrets, Arquitens-class ships can absorb a surprising amount of damage thanks to their armored hulls and layers of energy shielding.

=== Imperial Interdictor (Interdictor-class heavy cruiser) ===
The Imperial Interdictor is an experimental cruiser which made its first television appearance in Star Wars Rebels. The ship is described in Star Wars literature as being manufactured by Sienar Fleet Systems for the Imperial Navy to help enforce planetary blockades. At 1,129 m (3,704 ft) long and with a crew of over 2,800, the Interdictor is armed with twenty quad laser cannons and can carry twenty-four TIE fighters. The centerpiece of the ship however is its four dome-shaped gravity well projectors which can create a powerful gravitational force that stops the hyperdrive units of nearby ships and forces them out of hyperspace. Commanded by Admiral Brom Titus, this prototype ship was destroyed by the rebels, but it proved successful enough for Sienar to create a production line of Interdictor-class Star Destroyers with the same specifications and capabilities for continued Imperial use.

=== Justifier ===
The Justifier was Cad Bane's personal starship used in the unfinished Clone Wars episodes, starring him and Boba Fett. The Justifier appeared in Star Wars: The Bad Batch.

=== Lady Luck (Personal Luxury Yacht 3000) ===
Lando Calrissian owned a Personal Luxury Yacht 3000 named the Lady Luck that he purchased from an Orthellin royal mistress after the Battle of Endor. The Personal Luxury Yacht 3000 first appeared in the Star Wars Legends continuity with Mara Jade getting her own known as the Jade's Fire. The Personal Luxury Yacht 3000 also made an appearance in Star Wars: The Clone Wars 2008 series, where Obi-Wan Kenobi purchased one while undercover with Cad Bane and Moralo Eval. The pirate captain Hondo Ohnaka owned one called Fortune and Glory. The Lady Luck was introduced in the canon novel Last Shot, a tie-in to Solo: A Star Wars Story, where it was obtained under identical circumstances to Legends.

=== Lancer-class pursuit craft ===
The Lancer-class pursuit craft was a starship owned by Asajj Ventress, who used one called Banshee during her time as a bounty hunter during the Clone Wars. Because the Clone Wars series was cancelled Ventress' Banshee was inserted into the Dark Disciple novel.

Years later, the Lancer-class craft reappeared in Star Wars Rebels, where one was used by Ketsu Onyo, who named hers the Shadow Caster to aid the Phoenix rebel cell.

=== Malevolence (Subjugator-class Heavy Cruiser) ===
The Malevolence made its television appearance in the first season of Star Wars: The Clone Wars as the flagship of General Grievous. Described by in-universe sources as a Subjugator-class heavy cruiser built by the Free Dac Volunteers Engineering Corp, the ship's primary weapons are two massive ion cannons. Each can unleash a devastating wave of energy that disables any ships caught by it, leaving them vulnerable to be finished off by the Malevolence's 500 turbolasers. The Malevolence is depicted in the series wiping out a fleet led by Plo Koon before Anakin Skywalker infiltrates and sabotages the vessel's navigation systems, causing it to slam into a moon.

=== Mist Hunter (G-1A starfighter) ===
The Mist Hunter was a starship owned by Zuckuss and 4-LOM, two bounty hunters who first appeared in Star Wars: The Empire Strikes Back. The Mist Hunter first appeared in Star Wars Legends before coming back into Disney Canon in the Bounty Hunter comics.

=== Profundity (MC75 Mon Calamari Star Cruiser) ===
The Profundity first appears in Rogue One: A Star Wars Story, leading the Rebel fleet's attack on Scarif under Admiral Raddus. It is identified in Star Wars sources as a modified MC75 star cruiser, a class of Mon Calamari buildings and exploration ships which have been repurposed for war. The Profundity itself was the former Civic Governance tower of the city of Nystullum before joining the Mon Calamari's exodus from their homeworld, under the command of then-Mayor Raddus. At 1,204 m (3,950 ft) long, the Profundity has a crew of 3,225 and is heavily armed with twelve turbolaser cannons, four ion cannons, twenty point-defense laser cannons, twelve proton torpedo launchers and six tractor beam projectors. During the battle of Scarif the Profundity receives the plans to the Death Star from Jyn Erso (Felicity Jones) before transferring them to the Tantive IV docked inside it. However, with its hyperdrive disabled, the Profundity cannot escape the battle and is ultimately destroyed.

=== Punishing One (JumpMaster 5000) ===
The Punishing One was the personal starship of Dengar, a bounty hunter who first appeared in The Empire Strikes Back. It appeared in the Star Wars Legends continuity before making its first appearance in the Bounty Hunter comic series.

=== Razor Crest (ST-70 assault ship) ===
The ST-70 assault ship is a pre-Imperial gunship manufactured by the Corellian Engineering Corporation and used by local militaries, and was sometimes referred to as a "Razor Crest". One ST-70 similarly named the Razor Crest was owned and piloted by the Mandalorian bounty hunter Din Djarin in the Disney+ web-series The Mandalorian. It was destroyed by Moff Gideon's Imperial remnant during a skirmish to Tython, and was later replaced by a heavily-modified N-1 starfighter. Djarin later acquires another ST-70 that was confiscated from an Imperial commandant and subsequently restored during The Mandalorian and Grogu (2026), which was painted yellow and christened Razor Crest 2.0 as a replacement for the one destroyed on Tython and was used in addition to his starfighter.

=== Starhawk (Starhawk-class battleship) ===
The Starhawk-class is a battleship class used by the New Republic, first appearing in the Aftermath trilogy of novels. The prototype called the Starhawk first appeared in the video game Star Wars: Squadrons. It was built at the Nadiri Dockyards as part of Project Starhawk for the fledgling New Republic to engage Imperial capital ships on equal terms. The Starhawk was assembled from scrapped parts of Imperial-class Star Destroyers, and was equipped with a tractor beam generator ten times stronger than those on a Star Destroyer. The tractor beam was able to double as a weapon and tear sections of hull plating off enemy starships, and notably was able to drag much larger ships up to and including an Executor-class Star Dreadnought, with one Starhawk battleship turning the Battle of Jakku in the New Republic's favor by dragging Gallius Rax's flagship Ravager crashing to the planet's surface with it.

=== Stinger Mantis (S-161 "Stinger" XL luxury yacht) ===
The Stinger Mantis, more commonly known as the Mantis, was an S-161 "Stinger" XL luxury yacht piloted by Greez Dritus in Star Wars Jedi: Fallen Order and later piloted by Cal Kestis in Star Wars Jedi: Survivor.

=== Trailblazer (EML-850 light freighter) ===
The Trailblazer is a rare EML-850 light freighter that first appeared in Star Wars Outlaws. It was made by the Barsha family of Corellian industrialists during the Republic Era. The ship was one of the last of its kind and was a prototype from the Clone Wars. It served as the ship of Kay Vess, who stole the ship from Sliro Barsha.

=== Twilight (G9 Rigger-class light freighter) ===
The G9 Rigger-class is a model of light freighter manufactured by the Corellian Engineering Corporation that first appeared in The Clone Wars film (2008). One ship called the Twilight was used as a spice freighter by Ziro the Hutt until it was stolen by Anakin Skywalker during the Battle of Teth and was kept as a pet project afterwards, continuing to use it during infiltration missions as well as making modifications to it. Towards the end of the Clone Wars, the Twilight was in a state of heavy disrepair and was destroyed by Maul's Death Watch in an attempt to kill Obi-Wan Kenobi, who was piloting it on a mission to Mandalore at the time. The concept of Anakin being a spice freighter pilot during the Clone Wars dates back to Star Wars (1977), wherein Luke Skywalker was told by his uncle Owen Lars that his father was a navigator on a spice freighter instead of fighting during the conflict.

=== YT-2400 Light Freighter ===
The YT-2400 light freighter made its first appearance in Star Wars Legends as the Outrider, the personal starship of Dash Rendar in the Star Wars: Shadows of the Empire multimedia campaign. It is a playable ship in the Shadows of the Empire video game, and Kenner released an Outrider toy. While Steve Perry outlined the ship's story and role, Doug Chiang designed the ship itself.

The Outrider was digitally inserted into the Special Edition of A New Hope. It is unknown if the ship is meant to be same as the one in A New Hope. According to Gary Whitta, who served as writer of Rogue One, Dash Rendar is a controversial character among Lucasfilm Story Group, which decreases the chances of the character becoming part of canon.

Another YT-2400 which makes an appearance in the current Star Wars canon is Sato's Hammer, debuting in the Star Wars Rebels Season 3 episode Iron Squadron. It was piloted by Mart Mattin, who was a nephew of Rebel Commander, Jun Sato. The YT-2400 is described as a popular model among both freight haulers and pirates alike in Star Wars literature. Manufactured by the Corellian Engineering Corporation, it shares many design similarities with the YT-1300 series. It has a length of 21 m (69 ft), a Class 2 Hyperdrive, and maximum atmospheric speed of 800 km/h (500 mph). The ship is protected by a dorsal and ventral double laser cannon turret, a concussion missile launcher, and two layers of armor plating.

== Spacecraft appearing in Star Wars Legends ==
A number of named vessels appear only in Star Wars Legends sources, material which was branded non-canon after The Walt Disney Company acquired Lucasfilm. The Ebon Hawk is a Dynamic-class freighter and Revan's ship in Star Wars: The Old Republic: Revan, Star Wars: Knights of the Old Republic, and Star Wars: Knights of the Old Republic II: The Sith Lords. It is designed to be reminiscent of the Millennium Falcon. The Moldy Crow is a modified Corellian HWK-290 light freighter used by Kyle Katarn and Jan Ors in the Star Wars: Dark Forces and Star Wars: Dark Forces II: Jedi Knight video games. After it is destroyed in Star Wars Jedi Knight II: Jedi Outcast, it is replaced with the Raven's Claw. The Rogue Shadow is the ship used by Starkiller and Juno Eclipse in Star Wars: The Force Unleashed. The Virago is a StarViper-class attack platform that serves as Xizor's ship in Shadows of the Empire, with inferior versions serving as the primary starfighters of his private navy. Following Xizor's death, the latter version was made available on the open market, which was utilized by the Zann Consortium and modified them with old Clone Wars-era buzz droids. Its clamshell design, styled after a stealth fighter, is inspired by pulley castings. The Wild Karrde is medium-sized Action VI bulk transport, freight vessel used by smuggler Talon Karrde in Timothy Zahn's Heir to the Empire novels.

== See also ==
- List of Star Wars starfighters
- Walker (Star Wars)
- Star Wars planetary vehicles

== Bibliography ==
- Barr, Tricia; Bray, Adam; Horton, Cole; Horton (2017). Star Wars: The Visual Encyclopedia. United States: DK Publishing. ISBN 978-1-4654-5962-6.
- Barr, Patricia; Bray, Adam; Jones, Matt; Horton, Cole; Wallace, Daniel; Windham, Ryder (2019). Ultimate Star Wars New Edition. United States: DK Publishing. ISBN 978-1-4654-7900-6.
- Brooks, Dan; Crouse, Megan; Richau, Amy; Ratcliffe, Amy; Wainerdi, Brandon; Zehr, Dan (2024). Star Wars Encyclopedia:The Comprehensive Guide to the Star Wars Galaxy. United States: DK Publishing. ISBN 9780593960547.
- Dougherty, Kerrie; Fry, Jason; Hidalgo, Pablo; Reynolds, David West; Saxton, Curtis; Windham, Ryder (2020). Star Wars Complete Vehicles New Edition. United States: DK Publishing. ISBN 978-0-7440-2057-1.
- Luceno, James; Reynolds, David West; Windham, Ryder; Fry, Jason; Hidalgo, Pablo (2018). Star Wars: The Complete Visual Dictionary. United States: DK Publishing. ISBN 978-1-4654-7547-3.
- Lund, Kristin; Beecroft, Simon; Dougherty, Kerrie; Luceno, James; Fry, Jason (2016). Star Wars: Complete Locations. United States: DK Publishing. ISBN 978-1-4654-5272-6.
- Walker, Landry Q. (2018). Star Wars Encyclopedia of Starfighters and Other Vehicles. United States: DK Publishing. ISBN 9781465482716.
- Windham, Ryder (2019). Star Wars TIE Fighter Owner's Workshop Manual. United States: Insight Editions. ISBN 978-1-68383-527-1.
