= Universe of Star Wars =

Fictional universe of a media franchise

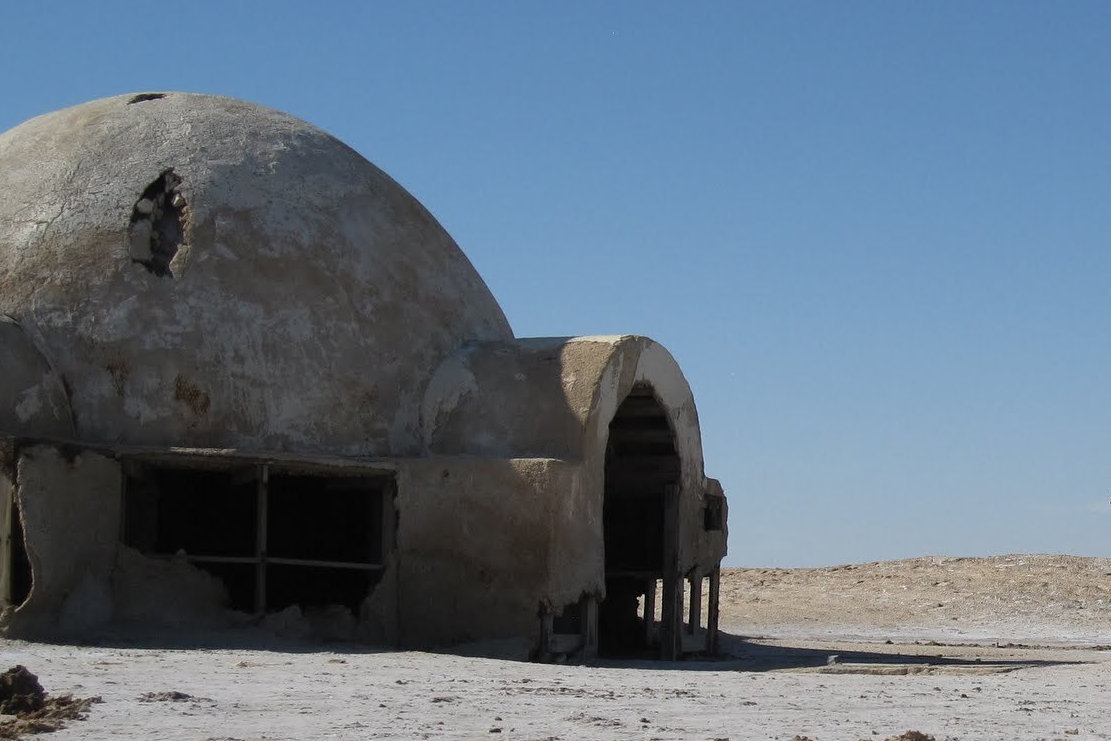
Lucas' intent when creating a universe for Star Wars was to tell a story separate from Earth, both geographically and temporally, set "a long time ago, in a galaxy far, far, away". Chott el-Jerid, Tunisia (pictured in 2010) was filmed for the setting of the planet Tatooine.

The fictional universe of the Star Wars franchise primarily takes place in a central galaxy that serves as the principal setting for its films, television, and multimedia installments. Originally established by George Lucas as a "galaxy far, far away", it comprises numerous fictitious planets, moons, star systems, and species. The galaxy is divided into four broad sub-regions: the Core Worlds, Mid Rim, Outer Rim, and Unknown Regions. Notable planets include Coruscant, an ecumenopolis in the Core that functions as a political and cultural center, and Tatooine, a desert planet located in the Outer Rim. The universe initially encompassed a shared collection of works recognized as canon by Lucasfilm as part of the official Star Wars storyline. Following the franchise's acquisition by Disney, subsequent expanded material in other media was later rebranded as the Legends universe, declaring it non-canonical to the official universe.

Within this fictional body exists a variety of intelligent species, including humans, Twi’leks, Wookiees, Rodians, and Hutts, as well as several major governing bodies throughout galactic history, such as the Galactic Republic, Galactic Empire, Rebel Alliance, New Republic, and First Order. Each of these entities operates under differing political structures, ranging from democratic institutions to totalitarian regimes. Interstellar travel is facilitated by hyperspace, allowing rapid movement between distant star systems. A central metaphysical concept in the Star Wars universe is the Force, an omnipresent energy field that connects all living things. The Force is divided into two principal aspects: the Light Side, traditionally followed by the Jedi Order, and the Dark Side, embraced by the Sith. The universe also features a high level of technological advancement, including starships, droids, and energy-based weapons such as blasters and lightsabers. The timeline of in-universe events is often measured in reference to the Battle of Yavin, a pivotal conflict depicted in the original 1977 film, serving as a chronological anchor for subsequent developments in the franchise.

== Conception and design ==
George Lucas began developing what would become Star Wars in the early 1970s while seeking to construct a large-scale narrative that drew on historical models and elements of classical mythology rather than contemporary science fiction convention; the resulting conception of a large and intricate fictional galaxy worked, in essence, to create a type of "modern myth". In interviews and production notes, Lucas described his interest in adapting mythic structures to a modern cinematic setting, an approach shaped in part by his reading of Joseph Campbell’s work on comparative mythology. Campbell’s analysis of recurring heroic patterns informed Lucas’s early story outlines, while philosophical traditions such as Taoism and Buddhism contributed to the formulation of the Force as a unifying principle structured around opposing tendencies: a moral dichotomy between light and dark sides. As the project moved toward production, Lucas worked closely with concept artists Ralph McQuarrie and Joe Johnston to establish the visual character of the setting. Their designs emphasized environments and technology that appeared aged and functional rather than pristine, a deliberate departure from the sleek imagery common in earlier science fiction cinema. This approach, later described as a "used future," supported the portrayal of a galaxy shaped by long-term habitation, uneven technological development, and accumulated cultural history.

The expansion of the Star Wars universe beyond the original films began largely in the 1980s and 1990s through licensed novels, comics, sourcebooks, and games, collectively referred to as the Star Wars Expanded Universe (EU). These works added new characters, planets, events, and timelines, and were produced under a continuity framework managed by Lucas Licensing. While Lucas acknowledged aspects of the EU, he did not regard it as part of the central canon. Following Disney’s 2012 acquisition of Lucasfilm, the narrative structure of the franchise was reorganized. In 2014, Lucasfilm rebranded the Expanded Universe as Star Wars Legends, designating those works as non-canonical. A new unified canon was introduced, beginning with the six original films, the 2008 television series Star Wars: The Clone Wars, and all subsequent material produced under the direction of the Lucasfilm Story Group. The new canon was intended to maintain consistency across media formats, including film, television, publishing, and interactive platforms. Concepts and characters from the Legends continuity have been selectively reintroduced in updated forms within the current canon.

== Astrography ==
=== The Galaxy ===
The Galaxy
- First appearance: Literature: Star Wars: From the Adventures of Luke Skywalker (1977); Film: Star Wars (1977); Television: Star Wars Holiday Special (1978)
- Created by: George Lucas
- Genre: Science fiction

In-universe information
- Type: Galaxy
- Locations: Alderaan; Coruscant; Endor; Hoth; Tatooine
- Characters: Luke Skywalker, Leia Organa, Darth Vader, Han Solo, Obi-Wan Kenobi, Palpatine, Lando Calrissian, Grand Moff Tarkin, Boba Fett, Jango Fett

The Galaxy in Star Wars is depicted as a barred spiral galaxy estimated to span over 120,000 light-years in diameter, comprising millions of habitable star systems. (Note: Fry & Wallace 2009, pp. ix-4, ch. "The Galaxy, Stars, and Planets") Its structure is divided into several concentric regions that determine levels of technological development, political control, and cultural influence. (Note: Fry & Wallace 2009, pp. 3–6, ch. "The Political Galaxy") These regions, from the innermost to outermost, include the Deep Core, Core Worlds, Colonies, Inner Rim, Expansion Region, Mid Rim, Outer Rim Territories, Wild Space, and the Unknown Regions. (Note: Wallace 1998, pp. xiv–xvii) Each region plays a distinct role in the political and economic dynamics of the galaxy, with the Core Worlds—such as Coruscant and Corellia—serving as major hubs of commerce and government. (Note: Fry & Wallace 2009, pp. 51–52, ch. "Corellia" and "Coruscant") In addition to regional delineations, the galaxy is subdivided into sectors, subsectors, and systems for administrative and navigational purposes. (Note: Fry & Wallace 2009, p. 8, ch. "Systems, Sectors, Oversectors, and Regions") Sectors—such as the Seswenna Sector or the Kanz Sector—are composed of multiple star systems and often governed by a moff or senator, depending on the galactic government in power. This multi-tiered hierarchy supports localized governance and military deployment, particularly in the vast expanses of the Mid Rim and Outer Rim. (Note: Fry & Wallace 2009, pp. 8–11, ch. "Systems, Sectors, Oversectors, and Regions") In Star Wars: The Essentials Atlas (2009), Daniel Wallace and Jason Fry described the structure of the galaxy when writing:

The known galaxy includes nearly a billion inhabited star systems, from uncharted settlements set up by smugglers to megalopolis worlds where scarcely a meter of untouched ground remains. Nearly seventy million of those star systems were sufficiently populated for representation of some sort in the Galactic Empire, a vast bureaucracy responsible for the affairs of more than one hundred quadrillion beings—and the apogee of centralized power.

In another passage, Fry and Wallace explain the function of galactic coordinates in the Star Wars galaxy:

Every star system in the known galaxy (and many more that have been imaged but not properly surveyed) is located by its XYZ coordinates: X measures the system's "east-west" location, Y measures its "north-south" location, and Z indicates its distance above or below the galactic plane.

Map of the Star Wars galaxy (Legends)

The galactic capital, Coruscant, located in the Core Worlds near the Galactic Center, historically functions as the governing seat for major galactic governments including the Galactic Republic, Galactic Empire, New Republic, and Galactic Federation of Free Alliances throughout much of the Star Wars timeline. The Core is connected to the rest of the galaxy through established hyperspace routes—navigable corridors through the galaxy's gravitational wells and stellar hazards. These routes, such as the Corellian Run, Hydian Way, and Perlemian Trade Route, enable safe and efficient travel and have historically dictated the rise of trade centers and political alliances. (Note: Fry & Wallace 2009, pp. 13–14, ch. "Astrocartography, Navicomputers, and Trade Routes") Beyond the Outer Rim lies Wild Space, a partially charted frontier, and the Unknown Regions, a vast and largely unexplored expanse marked by navigational anomalies, gravitational distortions, and the absence of established hyperlanes. These areas serve as narrative frontiers for new threats and civilizations, such as the Chiss Ascendancy and remnants of the Sith Empire. (Note: Fry & Wallace 2009, pp. 218–220, ch. "The Chiss Ascendancy") (Note: Fry & Wallace 2009, pp. 31–33, ch. "The Outer Rim Territories")

==== Political structure ====
According to Wallace and Fry, the Galactic Republic was governed by the Galactic Senate, whose representation evolved from individual star systems to sectors to accommodate expansion and reduce legislative paralysis. (Note: Fry & Wallace 2009, pp. 7–8, ch. "Geography and Structure of the Senate") Under Emperor Palpatine, the Senate was gradually stripped of its authority and eventually dissolved, with executive, judicial, and military power transferred to an Imperial hierarchy of planetary governors, Moffs, and Grand Moffs overseeing systems, sectors, and larger regions. These officials generally operated independently of local political institutions, while the Empire's territorial divisions evolved from earlier Republic administrative structures and incorporated some allied regions. Following the Empire's collapse, the restored Republic abolished the governor system, although it persisted in Imperial remnants. (Note: Fry & Wallace 2009, p. 112, ch. "Yavin") (Note: Wallace & Fry 2009, pp. 8–9, ch. "Systems, Sectors, Oversectors, and Regions")

==== Astronomical features ====
Astrophysical phenomena in the Star Wars galaxy impose significant constraints on space travel in various franchise storylines. (Note: Fry & Wallace 2009, pp. 11–13, ch. "The Core Worlds") The Maw Cluster, a region near the Core Worlds characterized by multiple black holes, presents extreme gravitational forces that distort space and pose severe risks to starships. (Note: Fry & Wallace 2009, p. 11, ch. "The Core Worlds") This location is prominently featured in Solo: A Star Wars Story as a notable navigational obstacle that surrounds the Kessel run, a hyperspace route connecting the planet Kessel to Oba Diah. Ion storms, noted in systems like Hoth and Ryloth, emit electrical discharges capable of disabling spacecraft systems. (Note: Fry & Wallace 2009, p. 99, ch. "Ryloth") Other hazards include gravitational rifts and subspace distortions that affect hyperspace route stability. These environmental conditions necessitate frequent astrographic updates and have influenced starship design in both canon and expanded universe materials.

=== Notable planets and moons ===
The Star Wars film saga features a wide range of fictional planets and moons that function as primary locations for key events across the galaxy and franchise storylines. Each celestial body is defined by distinct environmental and geopolitical characteristics.

==== Tatooine ====
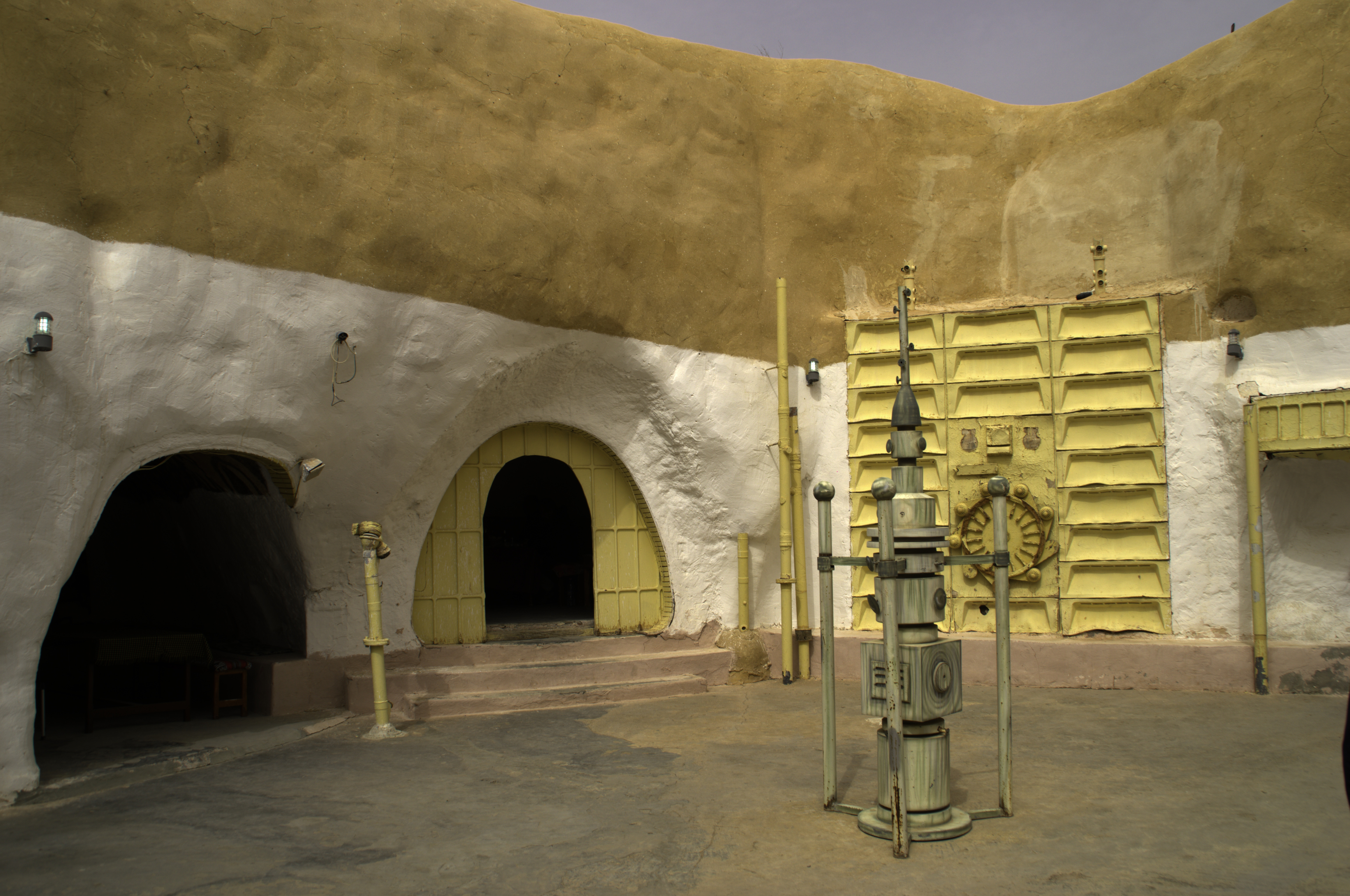
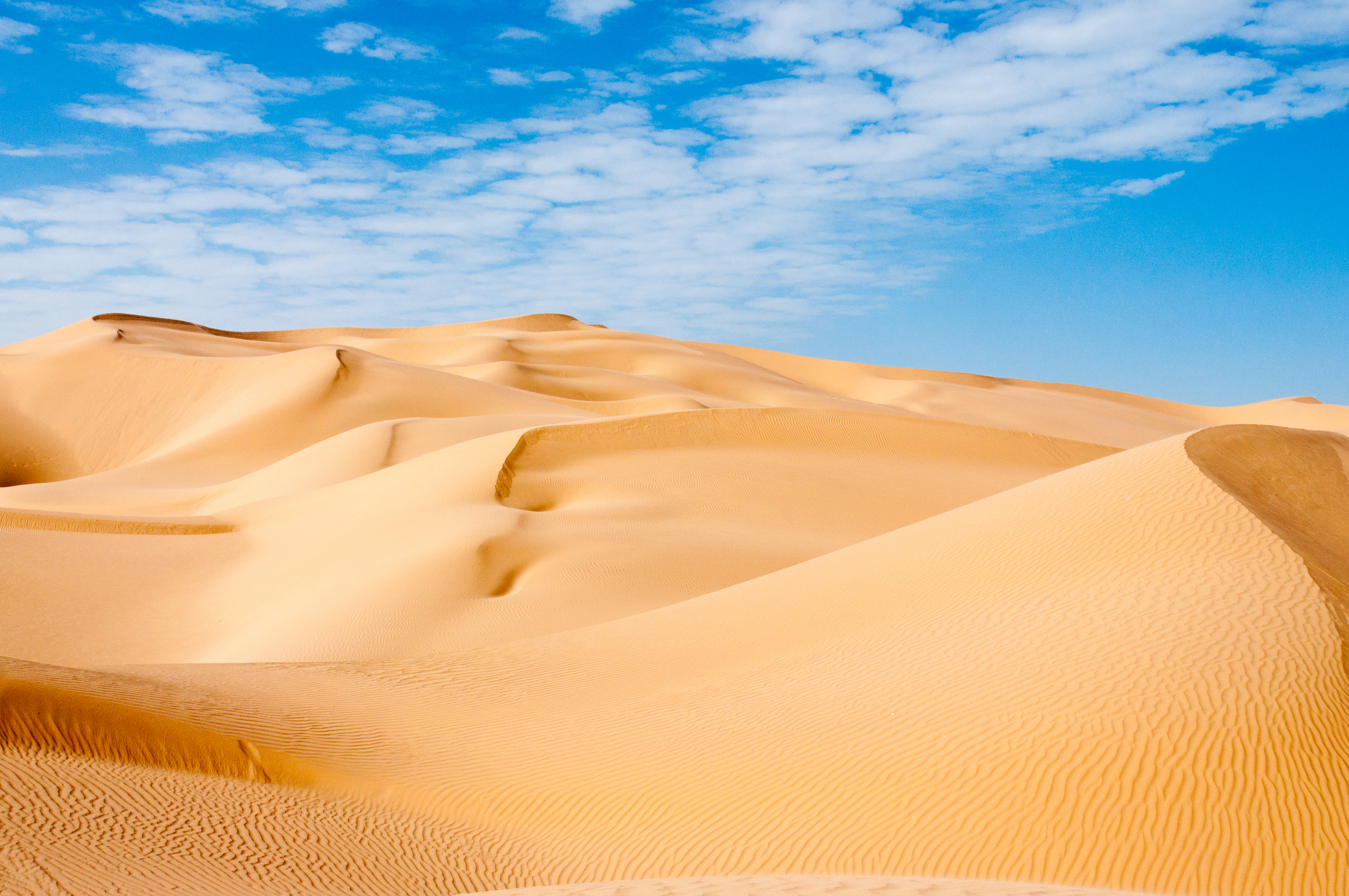
The Hotel Sidi Driss in Matmata, southern Tunisia, was used as filming location in Star Wars Episode IV': A New Hope, for the home of Luke Skywalker (left) and the Imperial Sand Dunes in Southern California (right) was used to represent Tatooine's dune sea.

Tatooine is a desert planet located in the Outer Rim Territories of the galaxy, orbiting a binary star system. It is depicted as a remote, arid world with harsh climatic conditions, limited water resources, and minimal political influence on galactic affairs. (Note: Fry & Wallace 2009, p. 105, ch. "Tatooine") The planet serves as the birthplace of Anakin Skywalker and the childhood home of Luke Skywalker, thereby occupying a significant position within the overarching narrative of the saga. Tatooine's surface is characterized by expansive dune seas, rocky canyons, and isolated moisture farming communities that use atmospheric condensers to extract water. (Note: Bray et al., pp. 178–181, ch. "Tatooine") Major settlements include Mos Eisley, a spaceport known for its criminal underworld activity, and Mos Espa, a trade hub noted for hosting podracing events. (Note: Bray et al., pp. 182–183, ch. "Mos Espa Grand Arena")

Indigenous species include the nomadic Tusken Raiders, a largely primitive and xenophobic alien race, (Note: Lewis 2006, p. 136, ch. "Tusken Raider (Sand People)") and the scavenging Jawas, a rodent-like people known for their mechanical salvaging and trading practices, (Note: Lewis 2006, p. 64, ch. "Jawa") both of whom have adapted to the planet's extreme environment. (Note: Wallace 1998, pp. 176–177) Tatooine exists largely beyond the practical reach of centralized galactic governance, with authority instead exercised through informal power structures dominated by the Hutts. Their control over trade and extralegal commerce has influenced patterns of migration to the planet, particularly toward established landing sites that support transient traffic. Harsh climatic conditions and limited resources have constrained permanent habitation, and repeated settlement initiatives have produced a low-density population distribution characterized by widely separated communities and minimal territorial integration. (Note: Bray et al., pp. 178–181, ch. "Tatooine")

The landscape George Lucas chose to depict in Tatooine scenes was largely based on real-world geographical features. Southern Tunisia’s semi-arid and desert climate provided a suitable environment for filming, representing the planet's harsh conditions. Several key scenes involving Luke Skywalker and Darth Vader's early lives were shot in this region, and the film sets have since become notable cultural landmarks in Tunisia. Tunisia is also the namesake of the planet Tatooine. Although Lucas initially intended to name the planet Utapau, he changed it during the filming of Star Wars (1977) (Note: Later retitled Star Wars: Episode IV – A New Hope) upon realizing the name was similar to that of a female character in Star Trek. The planet was subsequently named after the Tunisian city of Tataouine, which served as a base for Lucas and his crew during production. George Lucas used three Tunisian ksour—fortified Berber granaries—in and around the city of Tataouine to represent the slave quarters featured in the Star Wars prequel films. These included Ksar Hadada, Ksar Ouled Soltane, and the ksar of Medenine.

==== Alderaan ====
Alderaan is situated in the Core Worlds region of the galaxy, (Note: Bray, Horton & Barr 2017, p. 12, ch. "Core and Colonies Planets") characterized by temperate climate zones and developed urban infrastructure. (Note: Fry & Wallace 2009, p. 38, ch. "Alderaan") The planet holds political significance within the Galactic Republic and later the Galactic Senate during a large portion of the fictional timeline, and is the homeworld of Princess Leia Organa. (Note: Bray et al., pp. 92–94, ch. "Princess Leia") (Note: Wallace 1998, pp. 6–8, ch. "Alderaan") In Legend's sources, human colonization of Alderaan predated the formal establishment of the Galactic Republic, following the depopulation of the planet by the indigenous Killik species. Alderaan is regarded in cannon works as among the Republic's oldest and most prominent member worlds, widely associated with cultural production, academic institutions, and longstanding humanitarian engagement with other systems. As described by Kevin J. Anderson in The Illustrated Star Wars Universe (1995), Alderaan's surface is dominated by open grasslands, broad plains, forested regions, and extensive mountain systems, while entirely devoid of a global ocean. Alderaan is home to several native animal species, including thrantas, grazers, and nerfs. The High Council of Alderaan, led by a First chairman and a Viceroy, oversaw the planet's governance. Alderaan itself operated as a hereditary constitutional monarchy, with ultimate authority vested in the King or Queen of the Royal House of Antilles, later succeeded by the House of Organa through marriage.

In the waning years of the Republic, Alderaan was represented by Bail Organa, a Loyalist Senator who publicly supported Supreme Chancellor Palpatine while advocating assistance for refugees displaced by the Clone Wars. Organa became alarmed by the continued expansion of Republic's executive power during the war and, toward its conclusion, quietly coordinated with other Senators in anticipation of possible resistance. In the post-Clone Wars period, Alderaan instituted a formal policy of planetary pacifism. (Note: Velasco 1984, p. 4, ch. "Alderaan") While Alderaan remained an Imperial member world, Organa clandestinely aided the formation of the Rebel Alliance and prepared Leia Organa to assume his senatorial role. In 0 BBY, Alderaan is destroyed by the Death Star’s superlaser during the events of Episode IV – A New Hope, resulting in complete planetary annihilation.

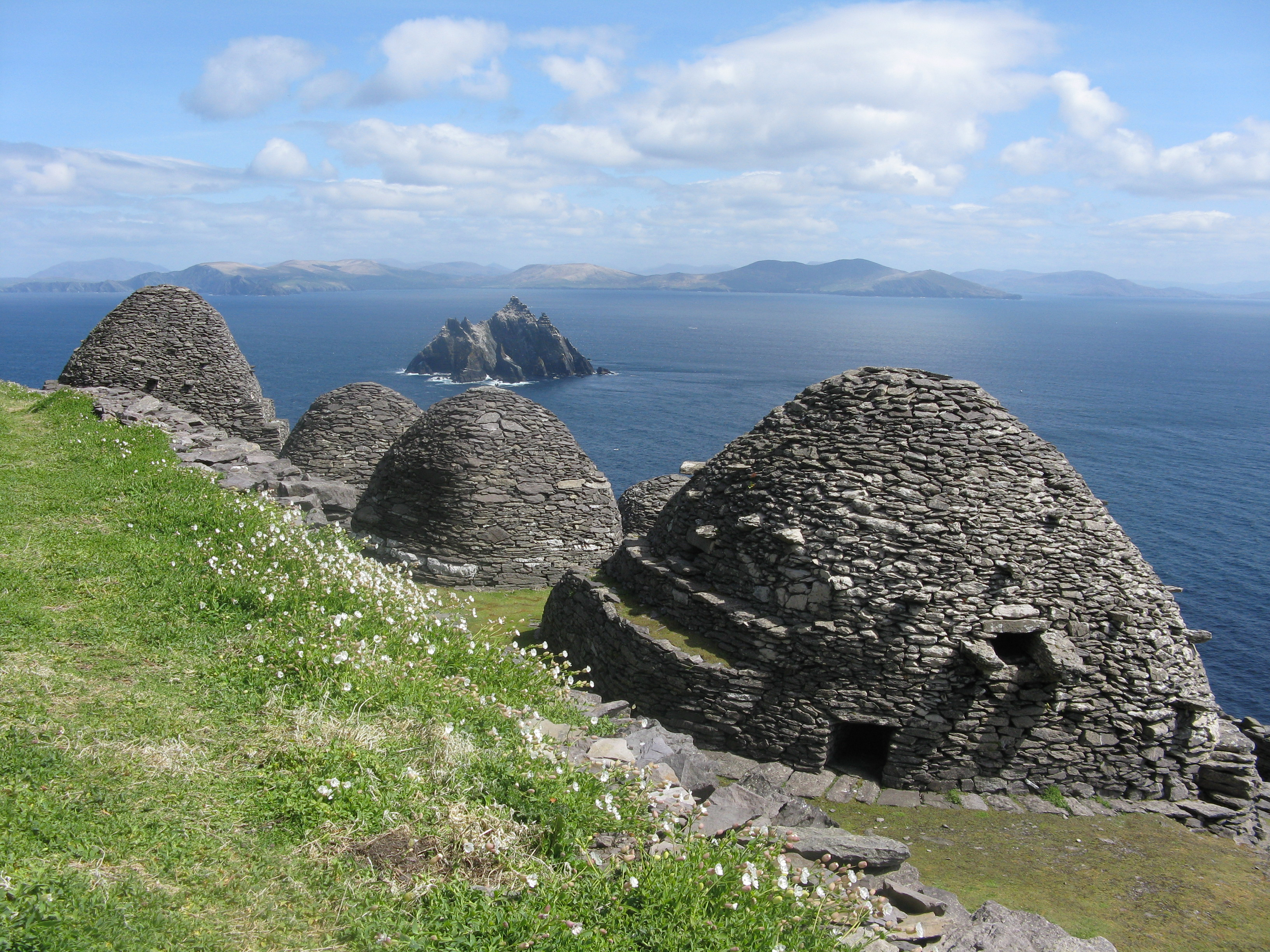
Beehive style huts on Skellig Michael, an island off the coast of Kerry, Ireland and the filming location of Temple Island on the planet of Ahch-To.

==== Ahch-To ====
Ahch-To is a remote, mostly water-covered planet in the uncharted Unknown Regions of the Galaxy. The planet is known as the birthplace of the Jedi Order and home to the first Jedi Temple. As seen in the events of Star Wars: The Last Jedi, Luke Skywalker found the remote world and chose to live in exile in the years following the victory over the Galactic Empire, where he was eventually discovered by Rey. Ahch-To is inhabited by Porgs, small avian puffin-like species, as well as the Caretakers, an enclave of females from the Lanai species who attend to the Temple Island's ancient structures.

==== Hoth ====
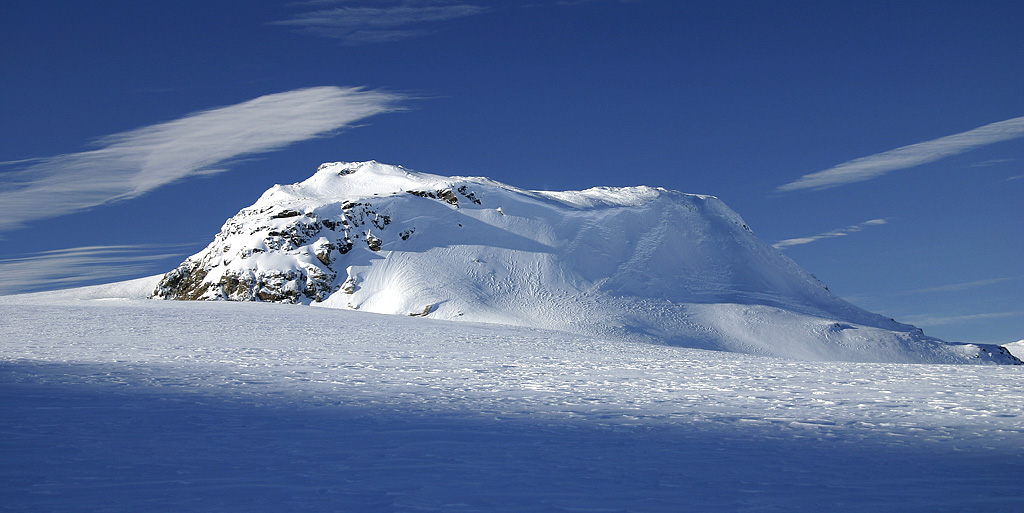
Hardangerjøkulen Glacier in Norway, used for exterior scenes during the Battle of Hoth

Hoth is an ice-covered planet situated in the Outer Rim Territories, featuring extensive glaciation and subzero temperatures. (Note: Bray, Horton & Barr 2017, pp. 112–113) Its terrain is dominated by mountain ranges that feed slow-moving glaciers, forming expansive snowfields and icy tundra. (Note: Wallace 1998, pp. 98–99, ch. "Hoth") The planet is subject to frequent meteoroid impacts due to its proximity to an unstable asteroid belt. (Note: Bray et al., p. 230, ch. "Hoth" part: "Hoth Astroid Belt") Despite these conditions, life has adapted to the environment; geothermal activity beneath the ice sustains limited ecosystems, including herbivorous TaunTauns that feed on lichens in glacial caves, (Note: Lewis 2006, p. 125, ch. "TaunTaun") and predatory Wampas that hunt tauntauns and rear their young in subterranean ice formations. (Note: Lewis 2006, p. 148, ch. "Wampa") Sapphire ice worms inhabit the burrows of these caves, their activity producing wind-carried sounds across the frozen landscape. (Note: Bray et al., pp. 228–230, ch. "Hoth") As depicted in The Empire Strikes Back, the planet hosted Echo Base, a concealed Rebel outpost that was assaulted by Imperial forces during the Battle of Hoth in 3 ABY, leading to a Rebel tactical withdrawal. (Note: Velasco 1984, p. 16, ch. "The Battle of Hoth") Imperial ground forces advanced across the icy terrain, meeting resistance from Rebel starfighter squadrons, while Rebel transports evacuated personnel and materiel under heavy fire. Following the engagement, the Imperial forces secured the battlefield, and scavengers later arrived to recover wreckage.

During the production of the original Star Wars film, George Lucas created early notes outlining potential settings for future installments. Among the listed concepts were a "gaseous planet with a floating city," a "Wookie planet," and an "ice planet." The gaseous planet concept was later developed into Bespin, featuring Cloud City located in its upper atmosphere. The ice planet concept evolved into Hoth, which served as a primary setting in The Empire Strikes Back. The depiction of Hoth in The Empire Strikes Back presented significant production challenges. George Lucas envisioned the planet as a "very hostile" environment with strong winds and cold temperatures, and proposed an underground Rebel base concealed beneath snow-covered terrain. To achieve the desired visual aesthetic, the production team searched for a suitable filming location and ultimately selected Finse, a mountain village in Norway, in the spring of 1978. The area featured expansive glacial landscapes and provided necessary logistical accommodations, including a railway connection and hotel facilities for cast and crew. Although the initial shoot was scheduled for three weeks, production in Finse extended to over eight weeks due to adverse weather conditions and other complications.

==== Yavin 4 ====
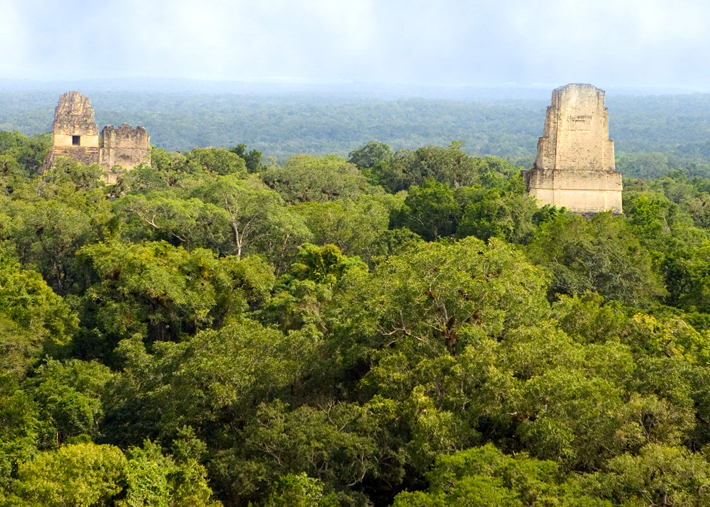
Ruins of the ancient Mayan city of Tikal, where scenes depicting Yavin 4 were filmed for A New Hope

Yavin 4, the fourth of 26 natural satellites of the red gas giant, Yavin, located in the "Yavin System" of the Outer Rim Territories, is a terrestrial moon covered by dense tropical rainforests and ancient Massassi ruins. It functioned as the primary Rebel Alliance military base led by General Dodonna during the Galactic Civil War, following their evacuation from Dantooine. (Note: Bray et al., pp. 222–224, ch. "Yavin 4") The moon comprises numerous pyramidal temple complexes constructed by the native Massassi species. The largest of these structures served as the Rebel Alliance's primary command center, as depicted in Episode IV – A New Hope, from which Alliance starfighter forces were mobilized against the Death Star's vulnerability. The Battle of Yavin, which occurred in 0 BBY, was launched from this location and concluded with the destruction of the first Death Star. Yavin 4 is featured as the setting in multiple Star Wars media, including Episode IV – A New Hope, the standalone film Rogue One: A Star Wars Story, in which the moon is depicted as the staging area for Rebel operations during the Battle of Scarif, as well as the animated series Star Wars Rebels, and the live-action series Andor.

According to The Definitive Guide to the Star Wars Universe (2019), Alderaan's geography largely consists of extensive mountain ranges, open plains, and numerous river systems. Volcanic formations contribute to fertile soils, while natural basins and lakes are scattered throughout the surface. The planet is covered by diverse ecosystems, including temperate forests, grasslands, and coastal wetlands, which support a wide variety of plant and animal species, while the absence of significant industrial development has allowed much of the natural landscape to remain preserved. The moons flora and fauna include the Grenade fungi in the forest understory, and bioluminescent orchids are flowering plants that emit light. Woolamanders occupy the canopies of marge Massassi trees, rearing their young in tree hollows, while golden whisper birds dwell among the upper foliage.

In Legends history, Yavin 4 was initially settled by the Sith Lord Naga Sadow, who established a long-term presence on the moon through the use of the Massassi and other subordinate forces. After the end of the Great Sith War, Jedi forces pursued Exar Kun to Yavin 4 and carried out an orbital bombardment that destroyed much of the surface jungle. Some of the resulting environmental damage was later addressed through the construction of a subterranean terraforming installation. Following these events, the Jedi Order removed references to the moon from navigational charts and historical records, citing its remote location beyond major hyperspace routes and its association with Sith activity. The Yavin system was later rediscovered by hyperspace scouts operating along the Hydian Way, leading to a brief period of economic activity focused on the recovery of Corusca stones from the gas giant Yavin.

==== Coruscant ====
Coruscant is a Core World planet that serves as the political, administrative, and economic capital of the Galactic Republic, the Galactic Empire, and subsequent galactic governments. (Note: Bray et al., pp. 184–186, ch. "Coruscant") Containing a planet-spanning metropolis, Coruscant is a prominent setting across multiple Star Wars media, first introduced on screen in Star Wars: Episode I – The Phantom Menace (1999), featured largely throughout in the prequel trilogy, and appearing briefly in the original (Note: Featured in a montage for the 1997 Special Edition re-release of Return of the Jedi.) and sequel trilogies. Coruscant includes a vertical and continuous urban environment spanning hundreds of levels, with affluent upper levels reliant on artificially circulated air and lower levels forming densely populated undercity districts inhabited by marginalized populations and a variety of species and cultural groups. (Note: Fry & Wallace 2009, p. 52, ch. "Coruscant") The planet was used as the central hub for several major galactic institutions, including the Jedi Temple, a chief administrative headquarters and central monastery for the Jedi Order, housing the Jedi Archives before being dismantled following Order 66, and the Galactic Senate, the seat of legislative governance for the Republic. As depicted in the early events of Star Wars: Episode III – Revenge of the Sith, Coruscant became a focal point of military and political activity during the Clone Wars. (Note: Wallace 1998, p. 62, ch. "Coruscant")

==== Dagobah ====
Dagobah is a swamp planet located in the Sluis sector of the Outer Rim Territories, characterized by dense forests and wetlands, and best known as the exile location of Jedi Master Yoda during the Galactic Civil War. (Note: Fry & Wallace 2009, p. 54, ch. "Dagobah") The planet supports a diverse and highly competitive ecosystem, including gnarltrees with a multi-stage life cycle in which mobile arachnid-like juveniles mature into rooted adult forms, as well as dragonsnakes, swamp slugs, and carnivorous fungi. Its limited accessibility via minor hyperspace routes and inconsistent appearance on galactic star charts contributed to several unsuccessful exploratory missions prior to the Clone Wars. (Note: Bray et al., pp. 208–209, ch. "Dagobah") Dagobah later became associated with Luke Skywalker's Jedi training in 3 ABY and continued to be noted for its significance in relation to the Force. (Note: Wallace 1998, p. 64, ch. "Dagobah")

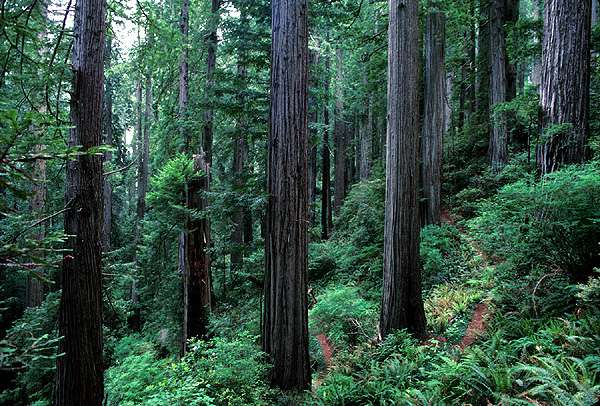
Redwood National Park in Del Norte County, California, where scenes of the forest moon of Endor were filmed for Star Wars: Episode VI – Return of the Jedi.

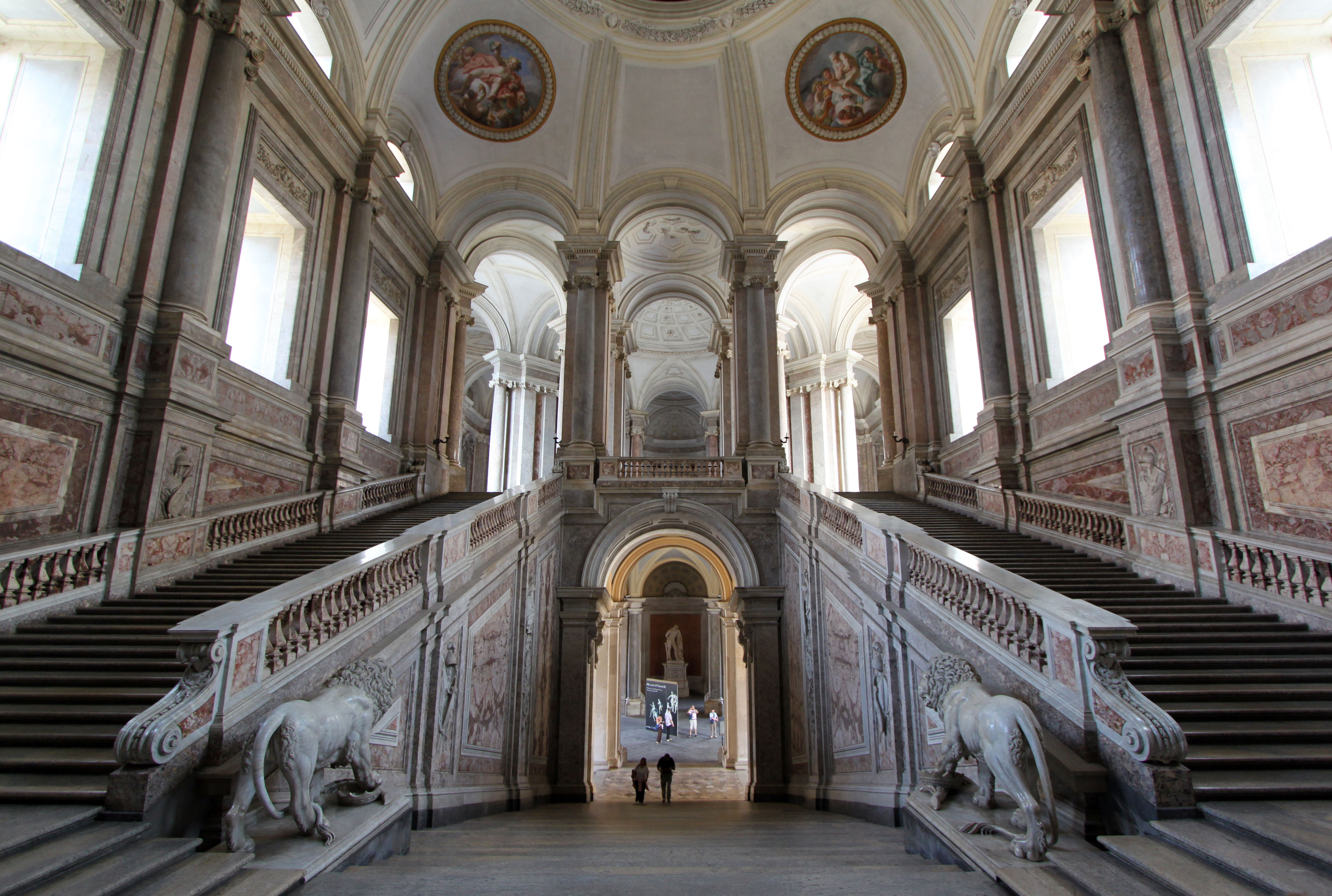
The Royal Palace of Caserta used as the interior for Theed City Naboo Palace

==== Endor ====
Endor is a forested moon orbiting a gas giant within the binary Endor system, located in the Outer Rim Territories. It is the largest of nine moons in the system, sometimes called the Forest Moon of Endor or "Sanctuary Moon." The planet's dense temperate forests allow for the habitation of the indigenous Ewok species, along with other native inhabitants including the Dulok, Yuzzum, Gorax, and Wistie. The Ewoks inhabit arboreal settlements built among the forest canopy and maintain a subsistence lifestyle based on hunting and foraging. Settlement structures are constructed through woodcraft, forming tribal village networks organized around extended family groups and governed by chieftains and elders. Fishing villages are prevalent along the shorelines of freshwater bodies. (Note: Bray et al., p. 234, ch. "Endor") The planet contained a shield generator installation protecting the second Death Star. The Battle of Endor in 4 ABY involved a Rebel assault on this installation, facilitating the destruction of the Death Star. (Note: Fry & Wallace 2009, p. 58, ch. "Endor") (Note: Velasco 1984, p. 15, ch. "The Battle of Endor")

==== Naboo ====
Naboo is a terrestrial planet situated in the Chommell sector of the Mid Rim, characterized by its vast grassland plains, dense swamps, and underwater oceanic systems. (Note: Fry & Wallace 2009, p. 82, ch. "Naboo") It features a dual-ecology, supporting both surface-dwelling humans and the aquatic Gungan species. The planet's capital, Theed, is known for its classical architecture and governmental functions. Naboo is notable in the Star Wars prequel trilogy as the site of the Invasion of Naboo in The Phantom Menace and as the homeworld of Padmé Amidala and Emperor Palpatine. (Note: Bray, Horton & Barr 2017, p. 110) The planet holds strategic political relevance within the Galactic Republic during the early stages of the Clone Wars.

== Fictional chronology ==
The Star Wars canonical timeline is structured around the Battle of Yavin, a military engagement between Rebel and Imperial forces depicted in A New Hope (1977), which serves as the central temporal reference point. Dates are expressed as BBY (Before the Battle of Yavin) and ABY (After the Battle of Yavin). The earliest era, occurring over 25,000 years BBY, includes the origins of the Jedi Order, the establishment of the Galactic Republic, and early galactic civilization. This expansive period is only partially detailed in canonical sources. Between 22 BBY and 19 BBY, the Clone Wars transpire, marking a large-scale conflict between the Galactic Republic and the separatist Confederacy of Independent Systems. (Note: Fry & Wallace 2009, p. 147) This conflict concludes with the fall of the Republic and the rise of the Galactic Empire under Emperor Palpatine. The Imperial Era encompasses the reign of the Empire until its decline, with key events including the destruction of the first Death Star at the Battle of Yavin (0 BBY), the Battle of Hoth (3 ABY), and the Battle of Endor (4 ABY), the latter resulting in the death of Emperor Palpatine and the effective dissolution of Imperial central authority. (Note: Baver et al. 2023, pp. 186–196) Following the Empire's collapse, the New Republic is founded with the objective of reestablishing democratic governance and stability in the galaxy. (Note: Baver et al. 2023, p. 248) However, Imperial loyalists survive as scattered remnants, eventually regrouping as the First Order. Beginning around 34 ABY, the sequel trilogy era portrays renewed conflict initiated by the First Order’s expansion, as well as the rise of new Force-sensitive individuals and continuing legacies of prior generations. (Note: Baver et al. 2023, p. 272) This era includes the Resistance movement opposing the First Order and culminates with confrontations that reshape galactic power structures. (Note: Baver et al. 2023, p. 280)

== Organizations ==
=== Confederacy of Independent Systems (CIS) ===
The separatist Confederacy of Independent Systems (CIS) is a central faction in the Star Wars universe, initially introduced in George Lucas’ prequel trilogy. In the events of Star Wars: Episode II – Attack of the Clones, the separatist movement, organized by former Jedi Master Count Dooku, is formed by several planetary systems seceding from the Galactic Republic due to dissatisfaction with several problems in the Republic: ineffectual government, heavy taxes, and perceived favoritism of the Core Worlds over the Outer Rim planets. As numerous corporate interests in the galaxy pledge their allegiance to the Confederacy, war soon develops between Republican Clone forces and Separatist Battle droid armies. Alongside military strategist General Grievous and business executive and politician Nute Gunray, the CIS and the Clone Wars were covertly orchestrated by secret Sith Lord and Republic Supreme Chancellor Palpatine (also known by his Sith name Darth Sidious), to facilitate the Sith's ultimate plot to purge the Jedi and regain control of the galaxy. The Confederacy and its three-year engagement in the Clone Wars is featured in numerous Star Wars books, comics and games, predominantly in two eponymous animated television shows and a 2008 film.

=== First Order ===
The First Order was implemented as the main antagonistic faction of the Star Wars sequel trilogy and introduced in the trilogy's first installment, Star Wars: The Force Awakens. A military dictatorship and rump state, the First Order originated from the remnants of the Galactic Empire following its defeat at the Battle of Endor in 4 ABY, as depicted in the events of Return of the Jedi. (Note: Fry & Urquhart 2012, pp. 185–220) As various surviving Imperial factions began to reorganize, the emergent New Republic experienced an internal power struggle between two ideologically divergent parties within its senate. As described in Star Wars: Bloodline, a Centrist coalition (largely consisting of former Imperials) in the New Republic Senate opposes the anti-centralist policies of the Populists, led by Leia Organa, and succeeds to combine with a developing government called "the First Order", considered to be the successor of the Empire. In the following years, the First Order builds its forces under the autocratic guidance of Supreme Leader Snoke, a proxy for the resurrected Emperor Palpatine. Exploiting the New Republic's political complacency, it launches a devastating surprise attack on the Republic's capital and fleet using the Death Star-like superweapon, Starkiller Base. Throughout the sequel films, the First Order demonstrates a high level of military and technological capacity, using Resurgent-class Star Destroyers, advanced TIE fighter variants, and elite ground forces including specialized stormtroopers and heavy assault walkers such as the AT-M6. Central to the plot of Star Wars: The Last Jedi, the First Order develops the ability for "hyperspace tracking," enabling them to pursue Resistance ships through lightspeed. The ultimate loss of leadership through the deaths of Emperor Palpatine alongside Supreme Leader Kylo Ren enables a decisive Resistance-coordinated and civilian-led assault on the Sith Eternal fleet, known as the Final Order, which results in the complete collapse of the First Order during the Battle of Exegol in 35 ABY.

=== Galactic Empire ===
The Galactic Empire, simply referred to as the Empire, rose during the waning authority of the Galactic Republic after the Clone Wars. Under the leadership of Supreme Chancellor Palpatine, the Republic was reorganized into an empire, with Palpatine declaring himself Emperor, as seen in the final acts of Star Wars: Episode III – Revenge of the Sith. (Note: Fry & Urquhart 2012, pp. 109–120 "Rise of The Empire") The new imperial regime quickly centralized power, dissolved the Senate's authority, and imposed strict control over much of the galaxy with little opposition from institutions such as the Jedi Order, which had largely been eradicated through Order 66. The Empire's conflict with the insurgent Rebel Alliance is the main focus of the original trilogy, portraying a galaxy-wide civil war between an authoritarian state and a revolutionary movement aiming to restore democratic rule. Central to this conflict is the Empire's construction of the Death Star, an orbital space station, equipped with a superlaser capable of destroying entire planets. The first Death Star was destroyed by the Rebel Alliance during the Battle of Yavin, while the incomplete second Death Star was also destroyed at the Battle of Endor, where the Rebel victory led to the death of Emperor Palpatine and the eventual collapse of the Empire.

=== Galactic Republic ===
The Galactic Republic, commonly known as The Republic, is the central protagonistic faction appearing prominently in the Star Wars prequel films. Serving as the primary governing body in the galaxy prior to the rise of the Galactic Empire, the Republic is depicted as a representative democracy with a central legislature known as the Galactic Senate, which includes representatives from numerous star systems and sectors. Executive functions are managed by a Supreme Chancellor, elected by the Senate. It is characterized by a long-standing alliance with the Jedi Order, which serves in roles such as diplomacy and military leadership during times of crisis. The Republic's three-years involvement in the Clone Wars marked the final phase of its decline, as emergency powers were granted to Palpatine, who centralized authority and limited democratic representation. (Note: Fry & Urquhart 2012, pp. 49–57 "Decline of The Republic")

=== Jedi Order ===
The Jedi Order is a monastic, spiritual, and paramilitary organization featured prominently in the Star Wars franchise. Established thousands of years prior to the events of the films, the Order is based on the study and use of the Force, particularly its light side. Its affiliation with the Galactic Republic throughout the prequel films is characterized by its role as peacekeepers. The Order maintains a hierarchical structure headed by the Jedi High Council and operates from the Jedi Temple on Coruscant, where it oversees the training of Force-sensitive initiates and administers its affairs. Adhering to a strict moral and philosophical code, the Jedi frequently intervene in conflicts across the galaxy at the request of the Republic. Their diminishing influence and growing entanglement in galactic politics ultimately contribute to their downfall during the rise of the Galactic Empire.

=== Mandalorian ===
The Mandalorians are a group of warrior clans originating from the planet Mandalore and its surrounding systems in the Star Wars universe. Known for their distinctive armor and combat skills, they have a complex culture centered on honor, combat prowess, and clan loyalty. Historically, the Mandalorians have been both mercenaries and conquerors, often involved in conflicts across the galaxy. Their society is marked by a strong martial tradition and a code that values strength and resilience. Mandalorians have appeared throughout Star Wars media, including the animated series The Clone Wars and Rebels, as well as the live-action series The Mandalorian. The character of Boba Fett, a notable bounty hunter who made his debut wearing Mandalorian armor, further popularized the culture. Over time, the Mandalorians have undergone significant changes, from their origins as fierce warriors to becoming more diverse in roles and affiliations.

=== Rebel Alliance ===
The Rebel Alliance, formally known as the Alliance to Restore the Republic, is a resistance movement in the Star Wars universe that emerges in opposition to the Galactic Empire. Formed from a coalition of dissident systems, former senators, and underground cells, the Alliance seeks to overthrow Imperial rule and restore democratic governance. (Note: Fry & Urquhart 2012, pp. 143–150) In the original trilogy, it plays a central role in the Galactic Civil War, beginning with the theft of the Death Star plans and the station's destruction in A New Hope. The Alliance faces major setbacks in The Empire Strikes Back but ultimately defeats the Empire in the events of Return of the Jedi through a coordinated assault that leads to the destruction of the second Death Star and the death of Emperor Palpatine. (Note: Fry & Urquhart 2012, pp. 151–179) Its early activities and formation are further depicted in Rogue One and other expanded media. (Note: Hidalgo, Horton & Zehr 2020, pp. 430–431)

=== Resistance ===
The Resistance is a fictional paramilitary organization in the Star Wars franchise, introduced in Star Wars: The Force Awakens (2015) as a response to the rise of the First Order. Formed by General Leia Organa, it operates separately from the New Republic, which maintains a policy of non-intervention toward the First Order. The Resistance engages in reconnaissance, limited military actions, and intelligence gathering, including the destruction of Starkiller Base. In Star Wars: The Last Jedi (2017), it is reduced to a small remnant following heavy losses. Star Wars: The Rise of Skywalker (2019) depicts its final mobilization alongside civilian and former military forces to confront the First Order and the Sith Eternal on Exegol. The group's structure and operations draw parallels to the earlier Rebel Alliance, with an emphasis on decentralized command and independent cells.

=== Sith ===
The Sith are a fictional order of Force-sensitive individuals in the Star Wars franchise who use the dark side of the Force. Originating thousands of years before the events of the films, the Sith follow a philosophy centered on the use of passion and power to achieve their objectives. The order is structured around a master-apprentice hierarchy, with teachings emphasizing the acquisition and exercise of personal strength through the dark side. Sith Lords often operate in secrecy and employ manipulation and conflict as tools to consolidate power. Notable Sith figures include Darth Sidious and Darth Vader, who play significant roles in the political and military developments within the galaxy. The Sith serve as primary antagonists in the prequel and original film trilogies, as well as in various expanded universe media.

=== Trade Federation ===
The Trade Federation is a large commercial and political organization in the Star Wars franchise, primarily featured in the prequel trilogy. It operates as a powerful trade consortium controlling significant portions of interstellar commerce and shipping. The Federation maintains its own droid army and starship fleet, which it employs to enforce trade blockades and protect its interests. It plays a central role in the events leading up to the Clone Wars, notably initiating a blockade and invasion of the planet Naboo in The Phantom Menace (1999). The Trade Federation's actions are later revealed to be influenced and manipulated by Sith Lords seeking to destabilize the Galactic Republic.

== Species and languages ==
=== Humans ===
Humans are a widespread and highly adaptable sentient species in the Star Wars universe, characterized by a bilateral, bipedal physiology and a wide range of phenotypic variation. As the most numerous and politically influential species in the galaxy, humans have played a central role in the development of galactic civilization throughout all major eras of canonical history. Humans are believed to have originated on the Core World of Coruscant, although alternative theories—especially in expanded universe and non-canon sources—suggest other potential ancestral homeworlds such as Corellia or even multiple locations due to early interstellar migration. By the era of the Galactic Republic, humans had colonized thousands of planets, resulting in significant cultural and linguistic diversification across regions. Despite this, the species maintained genetic consistency sufficient to interbreed with certain near-human species. The standard spoken language among humans is Galactic Basic Standard, often abbreviated as Basic. This language functions as the lingua franca of the galaxy and is used for interspecies communication, government proceedings, military operations, and trade. While many species understand Basic, humans are typically monolingual unless trained otherwise, relying on droids or protocol specialists for translation. Humans have constituted the majority of political, military, and administrative leadership across various regimes, including the Old Republic, the Galactic Empire, the New Republic, and the Resistance. Their dominance in political structures—particularly under the Galactic Empire—was associated with policies of speciesism and human-centric governance, though subsequent governments took varied approaches to species inclusion. Notable human individuals include Jedi Knights such as Anakin Skywalker and Rey, political leaders such as Padmé Amidala and Leia Organa, and military figures like Han Solo and Cassian Andor.

=== Wookiees ===
Wookiees are a sentient species native to the forested planet Kashyyyk, located in the Mid Rim region of the galaxy. Characterized by their tall, muscular build and dense fur covering their bodies, Wookiees possess notable physical strength and agility, which they combine with advanced technical skills and a cultural emphasis on loyalty. Their language, Shyriiwook, or Wookieespeak, consists primarily of growls and roars, which are generally unintelligible to non-Wookiees but can be understood by some species, including Chewbacca, among the most notable Wookiee. Wookiees live in large, tree-based communities built high in the dense forests of Kashyyyk, using the natural environment to create intricate villages and defensive structures. Historically, Wookiees have been known for their resistance to slavery and oppression, most notably during their uprising against the Galactic Empire's enslavement programs. They also played significant roles in various galactic conflicts, including the Clone Wars and the Galactic Civil War, often allying with the Galactic Republic, the Rebel Alliance, and later the Resistance.

=== Hutts ===
The Hutts are a sentient slug-like species native to the planet Nal Hutta, located in the Outer Rim Territories. Known for their immense size, longevity, and hedonistic lifestyles, Hutts are among the most influential non-human power brokers in the Star Wars galaxy. They operate through a decentralized criminal syndicate known as the Hutt Cartel, exerting economic and political control over vast regions, particularly Hutt Space and neighboring systems. Although not officially aligned with galactic governments, the Hutts have maintained de facto authority over several Outer Rim sectors, often through corruption, coercion, and organized crime. The dominant language of the species is Huttese, a widespread trade tongue that has evolved into one of the galaxy's most commonly spoken languages, especially in regions under Hutt influence. While native to the Hutts, Huttese is spoken fluently by many non-Hutt species such as Twi’leks, Rodians, Jawas, and Humans, particularly those involved in smuggling, bounty hunting, or black-market economies. The language features a simple phonetic structure and is typically transcribed using the Latin alphabet, though it also has distinct written scripts. Huttese's extensive use in interstellar commerce, diplomacy, and criminal dealings reflects both the cultural imprint and the socio-economic dominance of the Hutt species. Notable Hutt individuals, such as Jabba Desilijic Tiure, frequently converse in Huttese.

=== Jawas ===
Jawas are a rodent-like sentient species native to Tatooine, recognizable by their diminutive stature, glowing yellow eyes, and hooded brown robes. They are scavengers and traders by nature, known primarily for their practice of collecting, repairing, and reselling discarded technology, especially droids and mechanical components. Jawas travel in large, sand-crawling vehicles called sandcrawlers, which serve as both mobile homes and salvage depots. Their society is clan-based, with strong communal ties, and they maintain a barter economy rooted in opportunistic commerce and rapid negotiation tactics. Jawas speak a rapid, high-pitched language known as Jawaese, which is characterized by its tonal modulation and squeaky vocalizations. The language is largely unintelligible to most other species without translation devices or familiarity through trade interactions. Jawaese is distinct from the Basic language, and its structure reflects the secretive and insular nature of Jawa society. While Jawas are most prominently associated with Tatooine, canonical sources suggest the possibility of related subspecies or cultural analogs on other desert worlds.

=== Writing systems ===
Aurebesh is the primary written script used to represent Galactic Basic Standard, the most widely spoken language in the Star Wars galaxy. (Note: Bray, Horton & Barr 2017, pp. 124–126) It functions as an alphabetic system composed of 26 characters, each corresponding to a letter in the Latin alphabet, along with various ligatures for common letter combinations. Aurebesh is ubiquitous throughout the galaxy and appears on signage, displays, and interfaces across diverse planets and technological systems. While the spoken form of Galactic Basic is commonly rendered in English for media representation, Aurebesh visually differentiates the Star Wars universe by encoding the language in a stylized typographic system. The script was formalized in-universe by the Galactic Republic and continued to be used during the reign of the Galactic Empire, the New Republic, and later political regimes. Aurebesh is not unique to any species and is instead a cross-species, standardized writing system, enabling communication across galactic cultures. In-universe, it serves the same function as a universal script for trade, governance, and technology. Its name derives from the first two letters of its alphabet: "Aurek" and "Besh."

== Technology ==
=== Space travel ===
Space travel in the Star Wars universe is primarily facilitated by hyperdrive technology, which enables starships to traverse vast interstellar distances by entering hyperspace, an alternate dimension allowing faster-than-light travel. Ships equipped with hyperdrives rely on complex systems including 'hypermatter' reactors and navigational computers to calculate safe routes that avoid gravitational hazards such as stars and black holes. In realspace, ion engines provide sublight propulsion for maneuvering and planetary operations. Comprehensive life support systems maintain habitable environments during extended missions, while advanced communication arrays enable near-instantaneous data exchange across the galaxy. Starships vary widely in design and function—from small fighters to massive capital ships—each optimized for their specific operational requirements, incorporating extensive redundancy and safety measures to ensure mission success in the challenging conditions of space.

=== Droids and weapons ===
Droids in the Star Wars universe are autonomous or semi-autonomous robotic entities designed to perform a wide range of tasks, from basic labor and maintenance to complex tactical and diplomatic functions. They operate using sophisticated artificial intelligence and programming protocols that enable learning, decision-making, and interaction with organic beings. (Note: Bray, Horton & Barr 2017, pp. 140) Droids are constructed from durable materials capable of withstanding diverse environmental conditions, including combat scenarios and space travel. Common classifications include protocol droids, which specialize in communication and translation; astromech droids, which assist with starship navigation and repair; and battle droids, designed for combat operations. (Note: Bray, Horton & Barr 2017, pp. 136–144)

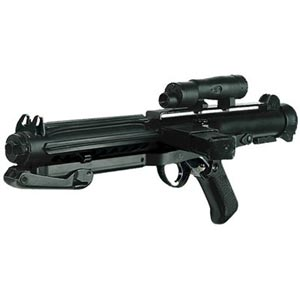
TIE Fighter (left) and a model replica of a E-11 blaster rifle (right)

Weaponry and defense systems in the Star Wars universe encompass a wide array of advanced technologies designed for offensive and protective purposes across multiple scales, from personal armaments to planetary fortifications. (Note: Cavelos 1999, pp. 126–150) Personal energy weapons, such as blasters, operate by projecting concentrated beams of high-energy plasma or particle bolts capable of inflicting significant damage to organic and inorganic targets. (Note: Cavelos 1999, p. 169) (Note: Bray, Horton & Barr 2017, p. 162) The iconic lightsaber functions through a plasma blade contained within a magnetic field, enabling precise cutting and deflection of energy projectiles. On a larger scale, starships and space stations employ turbolasers and ion cannons, which deliver powerful directed energy or electromagnetic pulses to disable or destroy enemy vessels and infrastructure. (Note: Bray, Horton & Barr 2017, p. 160) (Note: Cavelos 1999, pp. 144–170) Planetary defense systems often include shield generators capable of producing large-scale energy barriers to protect strategic locations from orbital bombardment or invasion. These technologies integrate principles of energy generation, magnetic containment, and directed energy weaponry, reflecting a complex understanding of physics adapted for military applications.

=== Spacecraft ===
Star Wars features several spacecraft types, each designed for specific operational roles. Starfighters, such as the notable X-wing and TIE fighter, serve as fast, maneuverable combat vessels primarily used in dogfights and small-scale skirmishes. Larger vessels like cruisers and frigates perform multipurpose functions including fleet command, escort, and heavy firepower support; examples include the Mon Calamari Cruisers and Imperial Star Destroyers. (Note: Cavelos 1999, p. 168) Transport ships, such as the Corellian freighters, are engineered for cargo hauling and personnel movement, balancing capacity with speed and defensive capabilities. Specialized ships include reconnaissance craft equipped with advanced sensor arrays for intelligence gathering, and troop transports designed for rapid deployment of ground forces. Additionally, capital ships like the Executor-class Super Star Destroyers function as mobile command centers and heavily armed warships capable of projecting power across star systems. Each spacecraft category integrates design features suited to its mission, ranging from agility and speed to firepower and defensive resilience. (Note: Cavelos 1999, pp. 126–135)

== Analysis and analogues ==
George Lucas has repeatedly stated in interviews that Joseph Campbell's work served as a model for the Star Wars universe, which incorporates elements from various philosophies, mythological narratives, academic concepts, theatrical traditions, and religious beliefs. In an interview with Bill Moyers, Lucas revealed that initially he believed mythology played no role in his films, but after researching fairy tales, folklore, and reading Joseph Campbell's The Hero with a Thousand Faces, he recognized that his first draft of Star Wars (1977) followed Campbell's classic motifs, thus shaping the film's narrative. George Lucas intentionally applied Joseph Campbell's monomyth theory in creating Star Wars and later developed a friendship with Campbell after publicly acknowledging his influence on the films. Campbell's work posits that all cultures have produced fundamentally similar myths throughout history. Recognizing this, Lucas developed a mythic framework designed to resonate widely by incorporating common archetypal elements found in these myths. Lucas has acknowledged that the Star Wars saga was, in part, conceived as an homage to the film serials popular during the 1930s and 1940s, which he watched growing up. Among the most influential of these was the Flash Gordon series, which featured a space-faring protagonist combating villains across the galaxy—a narrative framework that strongly parallels the premise of Star Wars.

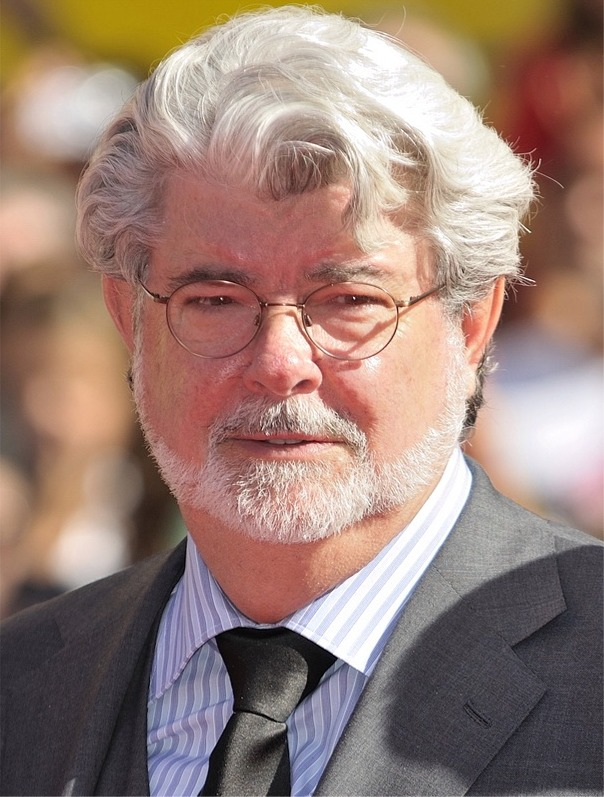
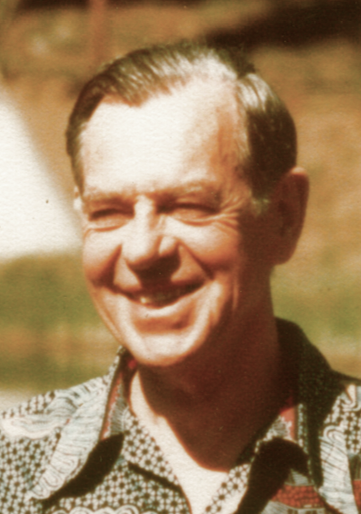
George Lucas drew much of his inspiration for the mythological concepts and narratives in Star Wars from the writings and theories of Joseph Campbell, particularly his concept the monomyth, as well as his themes of spiritual energy and duality, which helped shape the idea of the Force.

The story being told in 'Star Wars' is a classic one. Every few hundred years, the story is retold because we have a tendency to do the same things over and over again. Power corrupts, and when you're in charge, you start doing things that you think are right, but they're actually not.

— George Lucas

In addition to influences from comic books, science fiction, and film serials, Lucas drew inspiration from historical narratives and American cultural mythology. Much of the popular imagery associated with the American "Old West" originated from 19th-century dime novels that dramatized the exploits of historical figures. These stories helped shape archetypes such as the "lone gunman"—a figure who often embodied themes of individualism and frontier justice. The Star Wars universe incorporates similar narrative elements, particularly through characters who resemble solitary heroes confronting injustice in a large, untamed setting. These Western-style narratives were often loosely based on real historical figures, including Wyatt Earp, Doc Holliday, and Bat Masterson.

Nazi Germany is one of the most notable historical influences on the depiction of the Galactic Empire in Star Wars. The Empire's aesthetic and ideological traits—including its emphasis on uniformity and suppression of diversity—mirror those of the Nazi regime. George Lucas explicitly named the Empire's foot soldiers "stormtroopers," a direct reference to the Nazi Sturmabteilung, or SA, which served as Adolf Hitler’s paramilitary wing. Visual symbolism further reinforces this connection. The Empire is associated with a palette of white (stormtroopers), black (Darth Vader), and red (the Emperor's Royal Guard)—colors that correspond to the flag of Nazi Germany. The Galactic Empire also functions as a metaphor for authoritarian control in a broader cultural sense, representing a faceless and oppressive regime reminiscent of "Big Brother" or "the man" in modern discourse. Lucas's depiction of the Empire draws upon familiar historical and fictional archetypes of tyranny, making its narrative role both accessible and resonant with audiences.

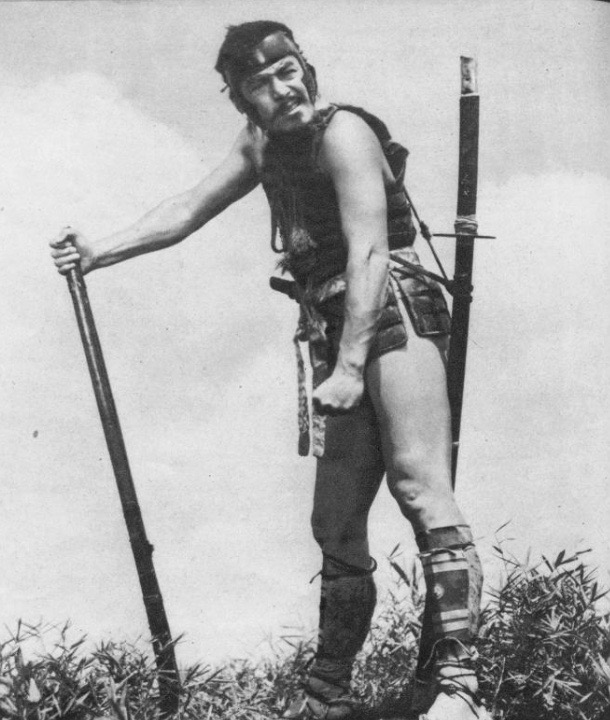
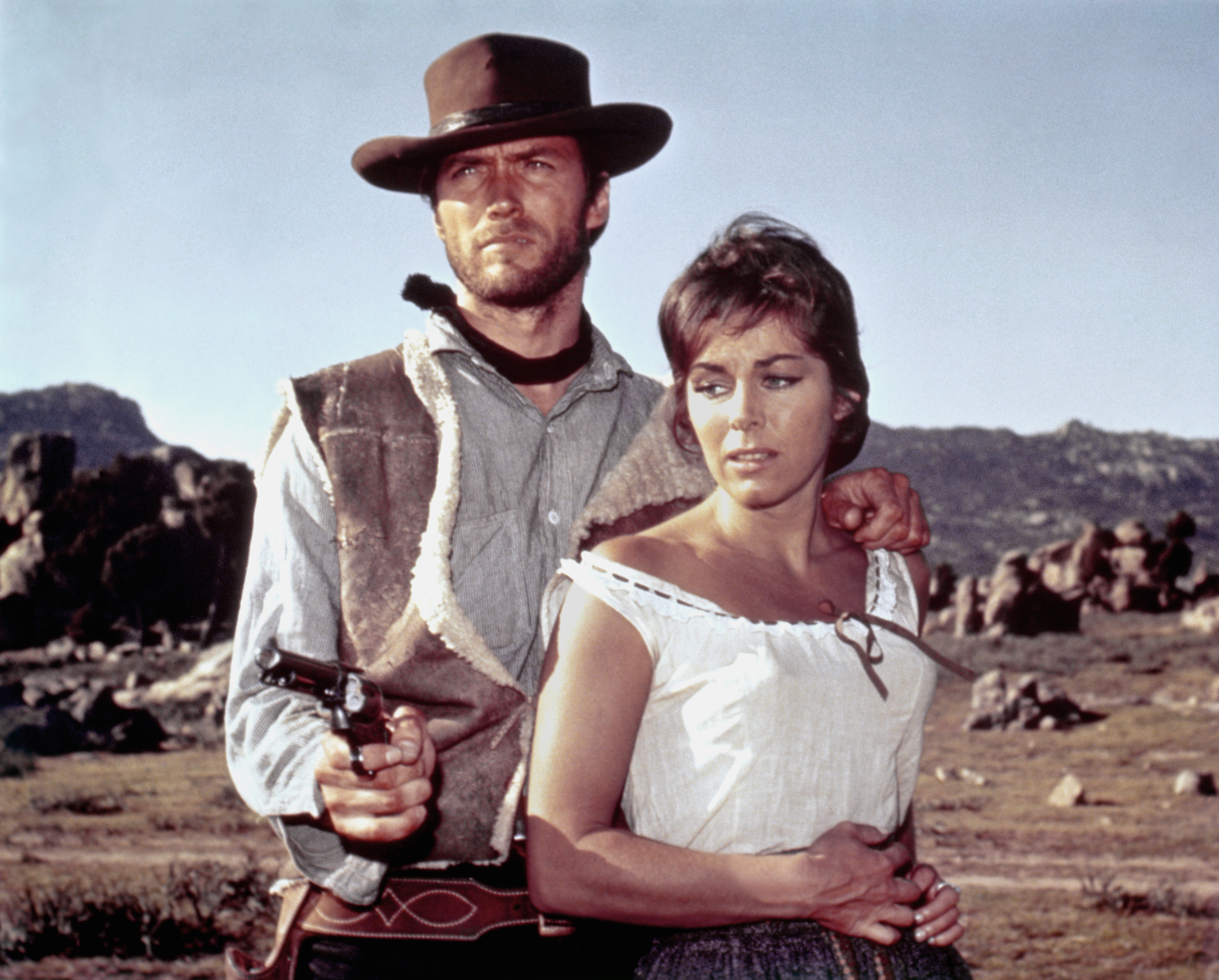
Toshiro Mifune as Kikuchiyo (left), holding a musket taken from the bandits in Seven Samurai (1956) and Clint Eastwood and Marianne Koch in A Fistful of Dollars (1964)

The transformation of the Galactic Republic into the Galactic Empire in Star Wars has also been compared to the historical transition of the Roman Republic into the Roman Empire. In both cases, a central leader rises to power by exploiting political unrest and military conflict, wherein Roman general Julius Caesar played a key role in dismantling republican governance, paving the way for autocratic rule. Similarly, in the Star Wars narrative, Chancellor Palpatine uses the Clone Wars to justify emergency powers and ultimately establish an authoritarian regime. Further influences on Lucas's narrative framework include the Japanese filmmaker Akira Kurosawa, known for his period dramas set in feudal Japan. Kurosawa's film The Hidden Fortress (1958), which centers on two peasants escorting a princess and a samurai general, directly inspired several elements of A New Hope (1977), notably the introduction of R2-D2 and C-3PO. In addition to his admiration for Kurosawa, Lucas drew heavily from samurai culture in conceptualizing the Jedi Order.

== Adaptations ==
=== Canonicity ===
While developing a Star Wars roleplaying game in collaboration with Lucasfilm, Wizards of the Coast game designers felt that an internal database was needed to track new content being developed for the Star Wars franchise. Lucas Licensing initially compiled official Star Wars universe material in reference books called Bibles, containing all canon story synopses and glossaries. This led to the divergence of two majors continuities of the universe: Canon and the Expanded Universe (EU), the latter of which originally served as an extension of the in-universe cannon which appeared in the first six films as well as the Star Wars: The Clone Wars television series developed and produced by Lucas. To distinguish these continuities, various levels of canon were established; G-canon (for "George Lucas canon") served as the in-universe contents included in Episodes I–VI, while T-Canon ("Television canon") and C-canon ("Continuity canon") consisted of the continuities of Lucas’ co-created The Clone Wars and most of the material from the Expanded Universe's books, comics, and video games. While the expanded material continued to maintain consistency with film and television content, most of the EU was rebranded as Legends in 2014 after Disney's acquisition of Lucasfilm in 2012, demarcating it as non-canonical to the universe. A new reconstructed canon was later established under the direction of "Lucasfilm Story Group".

=== Literature ===
A ghostwritten novelization of the Star Wars (1977) by Alan Dean Foster was one of the earliest depictions of Star Wars in-universe material. Published in 1976, six months prior to the theatrical release of the first film, its contents were largely based on Lucas's original screenplay for the first film, but also elaborated on in-universe lore such as languages, species, planetary systems, and chronology. However, there were several differences and inconsistencies between the film and its novelization. The portrayal of Emperor Palpatine is notably conflicting with Lucas's subsequent films and prequel trilogy, as the novelization presents him less as an all-powerful Sith Lord and more as a politically isolated figure manipulated by his advisors. Following the release of the first film, Alan Dean Fostered was commissioned to write a sequel novel, Splinter of the Mind's Eye, published in 1978 as a fallback plan in the event that Star Wars did not perform well in theaters. The novel is considered to be the first installment of the Expanded Universe. (Note: Hidalgo 2012, p. 264) Subsequent novelizations of The Empire Strikes Back and Return of the Jedi were written by Donald F. Glut and James Kahn, respectively. Several other derivative works would later be added to the EU in the ensuing decades; novelizations depicting alternate plots and variations of canon universe material were included as part of Legends, such as The Han Solo Adventures (1979–80), The Lando Calrissian Adventures (1983), and Thrawn (1991–98).

== See also ==
- List of science fiction universes
- List of Star Wars planets and moons
- List of Star Wars filming locations
- List of Star Wars creatures
- Star Wars in other media
