= Physics and Star Wars =

The interstellar space opera epic Star Wars uses science and technology in its settings and storylines. The series has showcased many technological concepts, both in the movies and in the expanded universe of novels, comics and other forms of media. The Star Wars movies' primary objective is to build upon drama, philosophy, political science and less on scientific knowledge. Many of the on-screen technologies created or borrowed for the Star Wars universe were used mainly as plot devices.

The iconic status that Star Wars has gained in popular culture and science fiction allows it to be used as an accessible introduction to real scientific concepts. Many of the features or technologies used in the Star Wars universe are not yet considered possible. Despite this, their concepts are still probable.

== Tatooine's twin stars ==
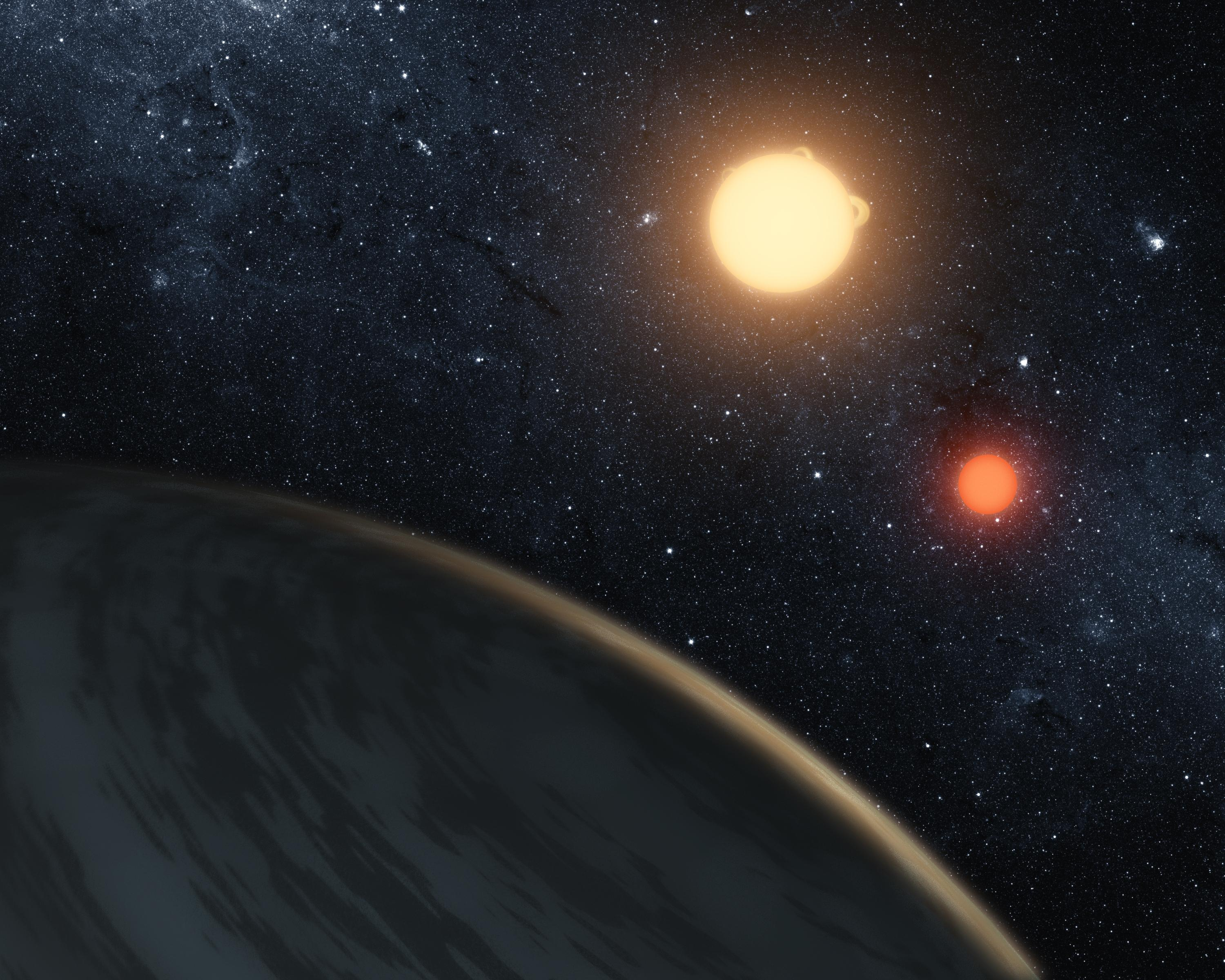
A NASA depiction of a theoretical viewpoint from Kepler-16b's orbit of its two stars

In the past, scientists thought that planets would be unlikely to form around binary stars. However, recent simulations indicate that planets are just as likely to form around binary star systems as single-star systems. Of the 3457 exoplanets currently known, 146 actually orbit binary star systems (and 39 orbit multiple star systems with three or more stars). Specifically, they orbit what are known as "wide" binary star systems where the two stars are fairly far apart (several AU). Tatooine appears to be of the other type — a "close" binary, where the stars are very close, and the planets orbit their common center of mass.

The first observationally confirmed binary — Kepler-16b — is a close binary. Exoplanet researchers' simulations indicate that planets form frequently around close binaries, though gravitational effects from the dual star system tend to make them very difficult to find with current Doppler and transit methods of planetary searches. In studies looking for dusty disks—where planet formation is likely—around binary stars, such disks were found in wide or narrow binaries, or those whose stars are more than 50 or less than 3 AU apart, respectively. Intermediate binaries, or those with between 3 and 50 AU between them, had no dusty disks. In 2011 it was reported by The Guardian that NASA space telescope Kepler had discovered a planet, named Kepler-16b, with twin suns as seen in the Star Wars films.

Certified astrophysicist and Star Wars fan Jeanne Cavelos explains that scientists have been skeptical about the likelihood of binary star systems such as Tatooine since the gravity of one star may prevent planets from developing around the other. Two stars of different masses orbiting one another would cause gravity fields to shift, causing potential instabilities in the orbits of any planets in their system.

According to her, even planets in more stable orbits of a binary star system would suffer other kinds of problems such as climatic problems. As an example, a planet in a binary star system orbiting the larger star would be drawn closer to its gravitational field, causing the planet to endure heat of great temperatures during this period. As the planet passes its larger star and reaches the orbit of its smaller star, the gravitational field of that star would give the planet more distance from it. The distance (perhaps along with the smaller solar projection of the star) would send the planet into extreme frigid temperatures.

According to Cavelos, astronomers hypothesize at least two possible solutions to these problems exist and that even life supporting binary star systems could exist. One scenario could be two stars billions of kilometres apart. A planet or planets would be able to orbit one star while at minimum influence of the other. A star known as Proxima Centauri, or Alpha Centauri C, is about one trillion kilometres away from its sister stars, Alpha Centauri A and B. Also according to Cavelos, astronomers believe that Proxima Centauri could have planets of its own. If so, they would be minimally influenced by Proxima Centauri's sister stars due to the vast distance between them and these sister stars. Assuming the existence of planets around Proxima Centauri, from these planets the sister suns would appear as bright stars in the sky.

Another scenario would be two stars that would be closer to one another at a distance of only a few million kilometres. A planet orbiting far enough away would be affected by their gravitational fields almost as if there were one. If the distance between the two stars was a small fraction of the distance between them and the planet, it would be stable for the planet. Dawn and dusk would occur on such a planet as they would on Tatooine.

== Blaster bolts ==
Star Wars makes heavy use of blaster and ion weaponry, attributed to laser, plasma, or particle based bolts of light. Characters can be seen escaping, or even dodging those bolts, and the blaster bolts themselves can be seen flying at a moderate-fast speed. Dodging a laser bolt would be nearly impossible, as it would travel at the speed of light. Due to that, it is reasonable the blaster fire would pass like a sparkle, and hit its target. Sometimes, characters will call the bolts "laser bolts" that, while they do not travel at light speed, are made of intense light energy.

However, many official canonical Star Wars sources state that blaster technology is different from real lasers. According to official canon, they are a form of particle beam. This is supported by how "magnetically sealed" walls deflect them.

The Polish Academy of Sciences in collaboration with the University of Warsaw managed to film an ultra short laser pulse by using cameras that produce billions of frames per second. These laser pulses were so powerful that they almost instantly ionized the atoms they encountered, resulting in the formation of a plasma fiber filament.

The effects of a blaster on a live target were portrayed more or less the same in every part of the Star Wars series. Since blaster bolts consist of light or particle based energy, the bolts would burn through the flesh of a target, with some even exploding against their target, exerting great force. The latter effect was usually from a blaster with greater size. Blasters have even been shown to have plasma energy as ammunition, which is portrayed as blue bolts. As of The Force Awakens, these blue bolts rupture and damage flesh with little to no burning, which causes bleeding injuries, as Poe shot a Stormtrooper with a blaster that caused him to bleed until death. Another instance of a blaster causing bleeding was when Chewbacca shot Kylo Ren with his Bowcaster, the small explosion against his body causing a bleeding injury coupled with burns. In many modern showings of blaster fights, someone hit by a blaster has cinders and soot outlining the area where they were shot. Also blasters hit with great amounts of friction and kinetic energy, enough to cause sparks to fly off the target, make the target burst into flames, or kill a target on impact, even if the target is not penetrated by the bolt, as it is when some targets are armored against blasters.

== Vibration in vacuum ==
Star Wars is famously known for its epic space dogfights. Blaster, engine, and explosion sounds can be heard in those space scenes. Space is a vacuum, however, and since sound requires matter to propagate, the audience should not hear any sound.

This has been explained in some Star Wars media as the result of a sensor system that creates three-dimensional sound inside the cockpit or bridge matching the external movement of other vessels, as a form of multimodal interface, although the audience is still able to hear sound even from a perspective that is in space. In the canon novel Lords of the Sith it is explained that the characters in a galaxy far, far away indeed do not hear any sound in space if no longer confined by their vessels:

[Vader's] interceptor streaked toward the gun bubble, aimed directly at it. Content with the trajectory, he unstrapped himself, overrode the interceptor's safeties, threw open the cockpit hatch, and ejected into space.

Immediately he was spinning in the zero-g, the ship and stars alternating positions with rapidity. Yet he kept his mental hold on the air-lock handle, and his armor, sealed and pressurized, sustained him in the vacuum. The respirator was loud in his ears.

His ship slammed into the gun bubble and the transport, the inability of the vacuum to transmit sound causing the collision to occur in eerie silence. Fire flared for a moment, but only a moment before the vacuum extinguished it.

Therefore, the ability to hear sound in a vacuum by the audience is not heard by the iconic characters, but only to the audience as an interpretation to imagine what sounds we hear in the films as out-of-universe artifacts.

== Asteroid field in Episode V ==
In The Empire Strikes Back, after the Battle of Hoth, the Millennium Falcon is pursued by Imperial ships through a dense asteroid field. The chunks of rock in the field are moving at rapid speeds, constantly colliding, and densely packed. Ordinarily, an asteroid field or belt is unlikely to be so densely packed with large objects, because collisions reduce large objects to rubble. About the only way for an asteroid belt to maintain itself would be to "balance destructive high-speed collisions with constructive soft collisions", but it is unclear whether this is happening in the film.

In contrast to Star Wars, the ship featured in 2001: A Space Odyssey, Discovery One, had a course that took it directly through the asteroid belt in the novel, without real fear of collision on the part of the mission organizers. However, the Solar System's Asteroid Belt is far less dense and several real spacecraft have passed through it without harm.

On the other hand, the so-called Trojan asteroid fields, named after the asteroids found in Jupiter-Sun Lagrange points, are known to be packed much more densely. The Solar System contains two such fields, the Greek Trojans and the Trojan Trojans, and two more (Neptune's trojans) have been discovered recently, but little is known about them currently.

Also, contained within this scene is a portion in which Han and Leia emerge from the Millennium Falcon, and are seen wearing only a facemask for air. The lack of pressure would have likely caused rapid decompression of their bodies, as the asteroid likely did not have an atmosphere. (See Effect of spaceflight on the human body.)

== Flight dynamics ==
Unlike the true flight dynamics of space, those seen in Star Wars closely mirror the familiar dynamics of flying in Earth's atmosphere. For example, fixed-wing aircraft must make banked turns because they use air pressure to operate. Yet, in the airless vacuum of space in Star Wars, the spaceships always (unnecessarily) bank when turning. Physicist Lawrence M. Krauss says this is for a simple reason: "it looks good." By banking, the center of gravity would be maintained so up is still up but the g forces generated at such speeds would surely injure the occupants. This is handled in the films by devices known as "inertial compensators".

In order to turn in non-atmospheric flight, some force must still be applied to the craft, presumably by some sort of thruster or generated force field wave, the location of which (in relation to the craft's centre of gravity) will dictate the orientation of the ship, or bank angle, required to make the turn.

== Destruction over Endor ==
Following the events of Return of the Jedi, there has been widespread speculation that the destruction of the second Death Star as seen in the film would cause a radiation spread on the forest moon of Endor's atmosphere and surface, given that the explosion was caused by an attack on its (nuclear) core reactor.

The phenomenon has been around supposedly since 1997 following a number of comic book productions on Star Wars beyond the original trilogy (of unknown canonicity, although like most other works it has been declared non-canonical and part of the distinct Star Wars Legends continuity in 2014) and has been known as "The Endor Holocaust". It came about from a rational analysis in multiple commentaries of the aftermath of the second Death Star's destruction and its hypothetical effects on the forest moon and its living inhabitants. Based on all the information from the stories, it has been concluded that a nuclear fallout would cause radioactive contamination on the surface of the planet (or moon), leading to widespread death and destruction.

More recent analysis by physicists has supported the theory from a scientific perspective.

Studying and analyzing the second Death Star's destruction, physicists hypothesize its results and consequences. Astrophysicist and Star Wars fan Dave Mosher covers the film's events in a 10,000 word essay. His first argument is the Death Star explosion resulting from the rebel attack on its nuclear reactor, the whole space station would be reduced to a large number of fine metallic pieces raining down on Endor. The debris would burn up in Endor's atmosphere turning into toxic soot and spark planetary firestorms.

Another scientist, Sarah Stewart, reanalyzes the situation and theorizes the moon's previous state after some environmental cleanup from the Death Star's fallout.

Matija Cuk, who studies orbital dynamics, theorizes the Death Star's reactor blowing up in one second, sending enormous chunks of debris at about 220,000 miles per hour. He argues the energy carried by the debris would not be sufficient to destroy the moon, but erode the side facing the Death Star. He also argues all ships near the Death Star at the time of its explosion would be destroyed by it. He also adds the rebels witnessing the explosion from the planet's surface would be killed by the radiation released from the explosion even before the debris reaches them.

He concludes the debris following the explosion would strike the moon's surface and would send rocks on the surface to the far side of the moon. In his analysis, the extinction of the Ewoks is inevitable.

Planetary physicist Erik Asphaug, who also studies giant impacts on moons and planets opposes these theories. He argues the Death Star would not be reduced to tiny bits following explosion. He argues that all nuclear explosions in rock would vaporize matter near it, but break matter a further distance away into pieces. The further away the pieces, the less they would break. He concludes large chunks of the Death Star would hit the forest moon's surface, some even creating craters. The most problematic result in his analysis is the fire caused by the large radioactive debris that would set the moon's forests ablaze.

A detailed analysis to the aftermath of the Death Star explosion in Return of the Jedi by planetary scientist Dave Minton, concludes all the Ewoks would have died as a result. Using the information provided from the holograms in the briefing scene aboard the giant cruiser Home One in Episode VI, Minton estimates the diameter of the Death Star (or Death Star II to distinguish it from the first Death Star in Episode IV: A New Hope) is about three hundred forty three kilometers or about seven percent the diameter of Endor.

This would make Endor slightly larger than Mars but about 15% the size of Earth. He also notes that in diameter, Endor would still be smaller than Mars, but denser in mass by his measurement formula. Endor's composition being smaller would be unusual, but not impossible according to him.

He applies this data to the orbital dynamics problem. Discounting the possibility of the second Death Star being preserved in Endor's orbit by the use of anti-gravitational repulsors (a commonality in the Star Wars galaxy), Minton instead compares the Death Star in the forest moon's orbit to that of a satellite in Earth's orbit. Applying Kepler's Third Law, he determines an orbital period as exactly one day. But applying this law, he determines astrophysical problems with the Death Star using Endor's gravity to sustain itself in the forest moon's orbit. For simplicity, he assumes a day on Endor as 24 hours.

Minton also argues the explosion of the second Death Star in Episode VI is lighter than that of the first one in Episode IV. His argument is drawn from the two films where the one in A New Hope explodes instantaneously; wheres the second one in Return of the Jedi explodes in a longer time period, allowing the rebel pilots to escape alive and their ships unharmed by the explosion. The film specifically shows Wedge Antilles and Lando Calrissian hitting two main sections of the core reactor from an X-wing fighter and the Millennium Falcon (co-piloted by Nien Nunb), causing the reactor to collapse and start a chain explosion and resulting in the Death Star blowing up from a series of internal explosions and collapses.

Minton therefore concludes there would be little vaporization of remaining material and that the explosion would move a lot slower than what is required to keep them in orbit, which he estimates is about 212 miles per second. Using the equation representing orbital velocity of the Death Star, he theorizes the fragments would need to be orbiting at about 4.5 kilometers per second to maintain orbit at the same altitude the Death Star had been. Since this does not happen, he argues the remains of the former Death Star would fall straight into the area where the shield generator has been on the moon's surface.

To estimate the effects of the second Death Star, Minton looks into its mass. According to estimated data from some students of Lehigh University, the steel mass needed for building one would be around 770 kilograms times the mass cubed in weight — this would give the Death Star a mass of about 10^{19} kg. Using this data, Minton produces equations that lead him to conclude the fragments would hit the moon's surface so hard it would cause craters almost four times the size of the Chicxulub crater in Mexico. This impact would cause a planetary firestorm and vaporize all lifeforms on the moon.

== Hyperspace travel ==
The hyperspace travel in the Star Wars franchise requires two elements, light speed travel and hyperspace. Ships in the Star Wars Universe have engines capable of propelling them to the speed of light. However, current physical theory states that it is impossible for any physical object to attain that speed, as long as the object has a non-zero mass, because an infinite amount of energy would be required to accelerate the mass to such a speed — a logical impossibility in our universe. Moreover, even if one were traveling at light speed, it would still take thousands of years to travel even a moderately sized galaxy. It is for these reasons that Star Wars space vessels use a "hyperdrive".

This is explained by having the ships warp to another "dimension", presumably a brane universe with different physical laws. Gravity supposedly reaches between branes. In Star Wars, gravity in real spaces forms gravitational "mass shadows" in hyperspace. Hyperspace in Star Wars is unrelated to the presumed space between universal "bubbles" in real life physics.

Hyperspace travel has also been noted to have some form of air resistance, as seen in "Deal No Deal", an episode of the Star Wars: the Clone Wars TV series. Trace Martez – smuggler and friend of Ahsoka Tano – apologises for flight turbulence on her heavily modified Nebula-class freighter, nicknamed the "Silver Angel", having "left the air brakes on". This would be normal, if Martez was encountering air resistance in the atmosphere of Coruscant - the planet she had just left. However, she only encountered turbulence once she entered hyperspace, which suggests that hyperspace has some form of gaseous atmosphere, for lack of a better term.

== Planets, moons and planetoids ==
Map of the Star Wars galaxy

In the Star Wars franchise, almost everyone can breathe and move on many planets, and these, as well as the star systems, are treated as small places. Both defects have an accurate explanation.

The Star Wars Expanded Universe states that many of the planets of the galaxy were colonized and adapted to the atmosphere and gravity of the most populated species, and there are also many species—such as Kel Dor and Skakoans—that need to use devices like breathing masks or pressurized suits. In the other case, since the Star Wars franchise develops itself to the intergalactic level, it is assumed that almost all the planets on it are planetary civilizations, a theory well-based in reality and that could possibly happen in a distant future.

The novelization of A New Hope, ghostwritten by Alan Dean Foster, mentions that humans colonized Tatooine in the section introducing the Tusken Raiders. The section implies that humans colonized the planet and settled in the more remote areas of the much sparsely populated planet, which did not give much chance of contact between the Tusken Raiders and the human colonists, who settled on the planet in small numbers.

Also in the same novel, the section introducing the planet Yavin describes it as uninhabitable. Its satellite moons are described as planet sized. The fourth moon called "Yavin IV" as it was named by early human colonizers is described rich with plant and animal life. It describes an ancient civilization that once existed in the jungles of the moon but disappeared centuries before human explorers ever set foot on the moon. The only evidence of their existence the ancient architectural sites and monuments they left behind (as seen in the film), most of which were mysteriously built. At the time the Rebel Alliance used territory on Yavin as their hidden base, the only thing left on the moon was plant, insect and animal life.

Jeanne Cavelos points to the Tales of the Jedi comic book series that document the early colonization of much of the populated Star Wars galaxy. Her argument is that the humans in the Star Wars galaxy being a single species, as well as appearing and living like human beings on Earth, likely originated from a single Earth-like planet, though the exact origin or home world of the human species in the Star Wars universe is not exactly known. She suggests that to be able to colonize other planets, the humans of the Star Wars galaxy could not have been genetically altered. She points to the fact that Luke Skywalker lived his life on Tatooine but did not require any genetic altering to adapt to Hoth, a planet with a climate estimately the opposite of Tatooine.

There are also problems with the possibility of humans altering the climate of the planet they colonize. She mentions the fact that there are native species on planets that humans live on, such as the Jawas alongside the Tusken Raiders on Tatooine who survive in the same climate as humans live on. If they lived in another climate prior to human colonization and environmental modification/alternation, such as terraforming, they are unlikely to survive.

Another possibility she suggests is the use of artificial aids that would help the colonists adapting to life on a newly settled planet before gradually adapting to life there. Some variations in climate and gravity would be adaptable to the colonists over a few generations as long as the variations are not too great. Through a period of generations, the colonists would evolve and adapt, even perhaps by evolutionary mutations.

There is also the unlikelihood of other planets having air just like Earth's and automatically being breathable according to other scientists, Cavelos claims. Only a small number of such planets probably exist. The chances are greater of finding planets with similar atmospheres that would require minimal atmospheric modification, but unlikely to be identical to Earth's that arriving humans could simply survive on them.

Another issue amongst this is that if human species would be unlikely to encounter a planet with an exact Earth-like environment, it would be even more unlikely for so many different alien species to be of the same environmental background and surviving in the same environmental conditions as seen at the Mos Eisley cantina in A New Hope.

== Lightsabers ==
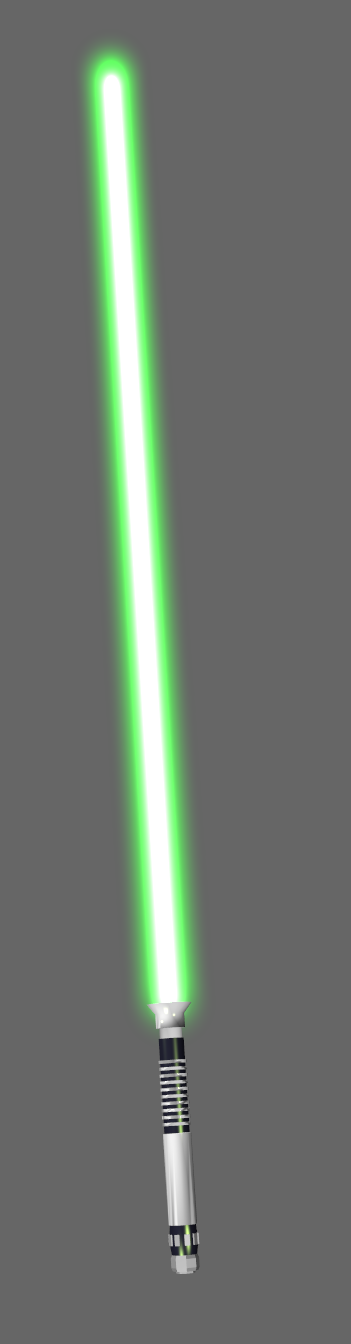
Green lightsaber

Often, lightsabers are said to be composed of lasers. However, using lasers raises several issues:

- The necessity of something to reflect the end of the beam.
- Having a compact and powerful enough power source.
- Lasers do not clash when their beams cross.
- Lasers are silent.
- There are some materials that can withstand a lightsaber, and some can even deactivate one upon contact.

Earlier forms of the weapon were known as "protosabers" in the Star Wars galaxy that required battery packs which were connected to the lightsaber hilt through a power cord. The battery pack was attached to a belt worn by the Jedi using the lightsaber, similar to how a flamethrower is worn, but was not ideal as it restricted the Jedi's movements during combat.

Lightsabers have been generally explained as plasma kept in a force field, usually an electric or magnetic field. The force field could not be magnetic, because the field contains heat, something a magnetic field is incapable of doing. Thus, the force field must be a shield not known by modern technology. Additionally, when two plasma blades would come into direct contact, it would almost certainly result in magnetic reconnection, causing an explosive release of the plasma contained in both sabers.

The problems with lightsabers that use actual light blades mentioned at the beginning of this section are not all insurmountable. For instance, it is mentioned that "Lasers do not clash when their beams cross", which is a statement based on our day-to-day experience with light. But Euler and Heisenberg have shown in 1936 that, for sufficiently high intensities, light can actually interact with itself (an effect due to quantum fluctuations of the vacuum). Given this, then it is possible to imagine a scenario of two lightsabers clashing in which photons coming from the hilt of one lightsaber are scattered toward the hilt of the other lightsaber (the scattering is done in the region where the two lightsabers overlap). Since photons have momentum, those scattered photons would exert radiation pressure on the hilt of the other lightsaber. Using techniques from ultrahigh intensity lasers, it has been shown that for lasers with an electric field strength of the order of 10^{15} V/m, the force felt in the hilt of each lightsabers is approximately 10 N (roughly the weight of a one kilogram object). This force due to scattered photons would give an impression of blade solidity when the two lightsabers clash. An incredible amount of energy is necessary to power such a lightsaber. For instance, powering a lightsaber with an electric field strength of 10^{15} V/m for one minute requires 10^{25} J, or ten times less than the total energy output of the Sun in one second. If the energy source is nuclear fusion, such a lightsaber would require 10^{11} kg of nuclear fusion fuel to operate for one minute. In other words, one would need to fit the equivalent of ten Great Pyramid of Giza-s of nuclear fusion fuel in the hilt to operate such a lightsaber for one minute.

== See also ==
- Technology in Star Wars
- Star Wars: Where Science Meets Imagination
