= Return of the Jedi (novel) =

1983 novel by James Kahn

- Author: James Kahn
- Language: English
- Series: Star Wars Novelizations; Canon G
- Subject: Star Wars
- Genre: Science fiction
- Publisher: Del Rey
- Publication date: Hardcover: October 1, 1994; Paperback: May 12, 1983
- Publication place: United States
- Media type: Print (Hardcover & paperback)
- Pages: Hardcover: 225; Paperback: 192
- ISBN: 0-345-30767-4
- Preceded by: Hard Merchandise
- Followed by: The Truce at Bakura

Return of the Jedi is a science-fiction novel, written by James Kahn and published on May 12, 1983 by Del Rey. It is based on the script of the film of the same name. According to Publishers Weekly, it was the bestselling novel of that year.

== Characters ==
- Admiral Ackbar
- Anakin Skywalker
- Bib Fortuna
- Boba Fett
- C-3PO
- Chewbacca
- Crix Madine
- Darth Vader
- Han Solo
- Jabba
- Moff Jerjerrod
- Lando Calrissian
- Leia Organa
- Luke Skywalker
- Mon Mothma
- Nien Nunb
- Obi-Wan Kenobi
- Emperor Palpatine
- R2-D2
- Wicket W. Warrick
- Yoda

== Differences from the film ==
- When Leia is captured by Jabba, instead of him saying, "I'm sure," to her warning of her powerful friends, he says, "I'm sure, but in the meantime, I shall thoroughly enjoy the pleasure of your company." Additionally, instead of simply licking his lips as seen in the movie, he is described as planting "a beastly kiss squarely on the Princess's lips".
- On the cover art, the laser light of Luke's lightsaber is blue, but in the film it is green.
- Obi-Wan Kenobi states that Owen Lars was his own brother and that Luke and Leia's mother died when they were four. The prequel trilogy establishes that Owen Lars is Anakin Skywalker's stepbrother and Luke and Leia's mother, Padmé Amidala, dies in childbirth.
- Obi-Wan recounts his battle with Anakin, stating that the latter "fell into a molten pit", part of the backstory later adapted as Star Wars: Episode III – Revenge of the Sith (2005). Additionally, Obi-Wan tells Luke that Anakin did not know that their mother was pregnant, while in Revenge of the Sith he is aware of the pregnancy.
- C-3PO's story alone does not convince the Ewoks to help the Rebels. Han attempts to persuade them by telling them the Empire is draining Endor's resources, but also fails. It is ultimately the Ewok Wicket who convinces the tribal elders to help. C-3PO is also described as having a "wobbly, amazed smile" after being levitated by Luke to impress the Ewoks, though the films depict the droid's face as immotile.
- Ewoks Paploo and Teebo are shown doing many things done by other Ewoks in the film. They are not members of the party that captures the Rebels as in the film, but argue over what to do with them before Logray steps up with an opposing point of view. Teebo commands the Ewok army and initiates each phase of the attack. Also, Wicket and Teebo are the ones to assist Chewbacca hijacking the AT-ST, not Widdle and Wunka as seen in the film.
- In an expanded version of the initial conversation between Luke and the Emperor, Palpatine questions Luke about who instructed him after Kenobi's death. Upon learning that it was Yoda, the Emperor mocks the late Jedi Master by mimicking his object–subject–verb style of speech.
- The space battle above Endor is given an expanded treatment and a much larger Rebel fleet is described.
- Moff Jerjerrod is depicted as a sadist who derives an inflated sense of his own power from dominating his subordinates and fighting the Rebels as brutally as possible. This differs from scenes shot for (but not included in) the final film, in which Jerjerrod has a crisis of conscience in the final act.

== See also ==
- Star Wars: From the Adventures of Luke Skywalker
- The Empire Strikes Back (novel)
