= The Empire Strikes Back (novel) =

1980 science-fiction novel by Donald F. Glut

- Author: Donald F. Glut
- Language: English
- Series: Film novelizations Canon G
- Subject: Star Wars
- Genre: Science fiction
- Publisher: Del Rey
- Publication date: Hardcover: August 21, 1995; Paperback: April 12, 1980
- Publication place: United States
- Media type: Hardcover & Paperback
- Pages: Hardcover: 224; Paperback: 224
- ISBN: 0-345-28392-9
- Preceded by: Splinter of the Mind's Eye (1978)
- Followed by: Shadows of the Empire (1996)

The Empire Strikes Back is a science-fiction novelization written by Donald F. Glut and first published by Del Rey. It is based on the screenplay to the film of the same name by Leigh Brackett and Lawrence Kasdan from story by George Lucas. Along with the film, it introduces new characters, most notably Lando Calrissian and Boba Fett (though Fett had been seen in the earlier low-canon Star Wars Holiday Special, which was made completely apocryphal in 2014).

The novelization was released on April 12, 1980, over one month before the film's theatrical release on May 21. It was originally released in two forms; a standard edition and a special Young Readers' Edition that was condensed into 150 pages. Initial printings of both versions contained 8 pages of color photographs in the middle of the book.

== Development ==
The book was written by Donald F. Glut, who had been originally asked to write the novelization of Star Wars, but Glut turned down the offer because he wouldn't get paid very much and it would be credited to George Lucas. Glut had a much more negative experience while writing the novel than Alan Dean Foster did when Foster wrote the novelization of Star Wars, as information about the film's production was segmented inside of Lucasfilm. On one occasion he asked a Lucasfilm employee if a production sketch depicted Yoda, and the employee replied "Don't tell me! I don't want to know." In addition, Glut did not have access to film footage while writing the book, so his portrayal of Han Solo was more in line with what was portrayed in Star Wars rather than The Empire Strikes Back. Glut did not give additional insight into the film's characters or events, a fact that can be traced to the paranoia of the film's producers.

== Plot ==
Despite the destruction of the Death Star in the 1976 novel Star Wars: From the Adventures of Luke Skywalker, the Galactic Empire stills retains an iron grip on the galaxy. Upon discovering the Rebel Alliance's secret base, the Empire strikes with massive force, sending the rebels scrambling across the galaxy. Han Solo, Princess Leia, Chewbacca ("Chewie") and C-3PO are slowed down from escaping with the rest of the group by collapsing ice on Hoth. Throughout the story, they remain within the Empire's reach.

Luke Skywalker and R2-D2 flee to Dagobah, but not to regroup with the others. Instead, Luke seeks Yoda in order to be trained as a Jedi Knight. His development of Force sensitivity during his training gives him a sensation of the danger shadowing his friends. Subsequently, Luke's friends are captured in Cloud City. Han is frozen in carbonite and taken to Jabba the Hutt. Luke leaves Dagobah to save his friends. But it is a trap, as the unprepared Luke is drawn into an unsuccessful confrontation with the Imperial Sith Lord Darth Vader. He is left with a missing hand, near-death and reeling from the shocking revelation that Vader is his father. However, he is rescued by the Millennium Falcon.

As in the film, the ending sees Luke, Leia, Chewie, 3PO and R2-D2 reunited, with Luke and Lando finalizing their plan to rescue Han Solo from Jabba's captivity.

== Differences from the film ==
The book has some differences from the film, such as:

- Yoda has blue skin in the novel, in line with early concept art of the character, while in all other appearances his skin is greenish.
- Luke Skywalker's training with Yoda is given more detail than in the film.
- The Hoth battle is extended somewhat, such as when General Veers' AT-AT is destroyed by a Snowspeeder shortly after blowing up the rebels' shield generator.
- Darth Vader's lightsaber blade is blue in the novel, whereas in the films it is red.
- When Luke is attacked by Stormtroopers in Cloud City, he returns fire with his blaster, unlike in the film, where he does not fire a single shot.
- In the Battle of Hoth, Dack cannot get his harness done, as opposed to 'setting his approach vector'.

== Publishing history ==
The novel was published one week prior to the premiere of the film and three million copies were sold.

== Sequel ==
The book was followed in 1983 by Return of the Jedi, written by James Kahn. It is the third and final novel adaptation of the Star Wars classic trilogy.
