= Star Wars: From the Adventures of Luke Skywalker =

1976 novel by Alan Dean Foster

- First edition cover
- Author: Alan Dean Foster (credited to George Lucas)
- Cover artist: Ralph McQuarrie
- Language: English
- Series: Film novelizations Canon G
- Genre: Science fiction
- Publisher: Ballantine (United States), Sphere Books (UK)
- Publication date: November 12, 1976
- Publication place: United States
- Media type: Print (hardcover & paperback)
- Pages: 272
- ISBN: 0-345-26061-9
- Followed by: Splinter of the Mind's Eye (1978)

Star Wars: From the Adventures of Luke Skywalker is the novelization of the 1977 film Star Wars, ghostwritten by American author Alan Dean Foster, but credited to the film's writer and director George Lucas. It was first published on November 12, 1976, by Ballantine Books, several months before the release of the film. In later years, it was republished under the title Star Wars: A New Hope to reflect the retroactive addition of a subtitle to the film in 1981.

The prologue includes references to Palpatine and his rise to power, setting up the backstory for future films. The book also contains some differences from the film.

== Development ==
The book was written by Foster and based upon Lucas's screenplay for the first Star Wars film. Foster already knew Lucas' work through his films THX 1138 and American Graffiti.

Foster not only adapted the film's events, but also fleshed out the backstory of time, place, physics, planets, species, languages, history, and technology. When asked whether it was difficult for him to see Lucas receive credit for the novelization, Foster said:

Not at all. It was George's story idea. I was merely expanding upon it. Not having my name on the cover didn't bother me in the least. It would be akin to a contractor demanding to have his name on a Frank Lloyd Wright house.

Lucas, for his part, has been open about the fact that Foster ghostwrote the novel, noting this fact in his introduction to later editions of the book.

== Publishing history ==
The paperback book was first published in the US as Star Wars: From the Adventures of Luke Skywalker by Ballantine Books on November 12, 1976, six months before the theatrical release of the film. The cover art was by Star Wars conceptual artist Ralph McQuarrie, who was commissioned by Ballantine Books executive Judy Lynn Del Rey while he was working on visualization work for Lucas's forthcoming film. The cover depicts Luke Skywalker carrying a lightsaber, Chewbacca, C-3PO, and R2-D2 standing in front of an enlarged head of Darth Vader. On the back of the book was written, "Soon to be a spectacular motion picture from Twentieth Century Fox".

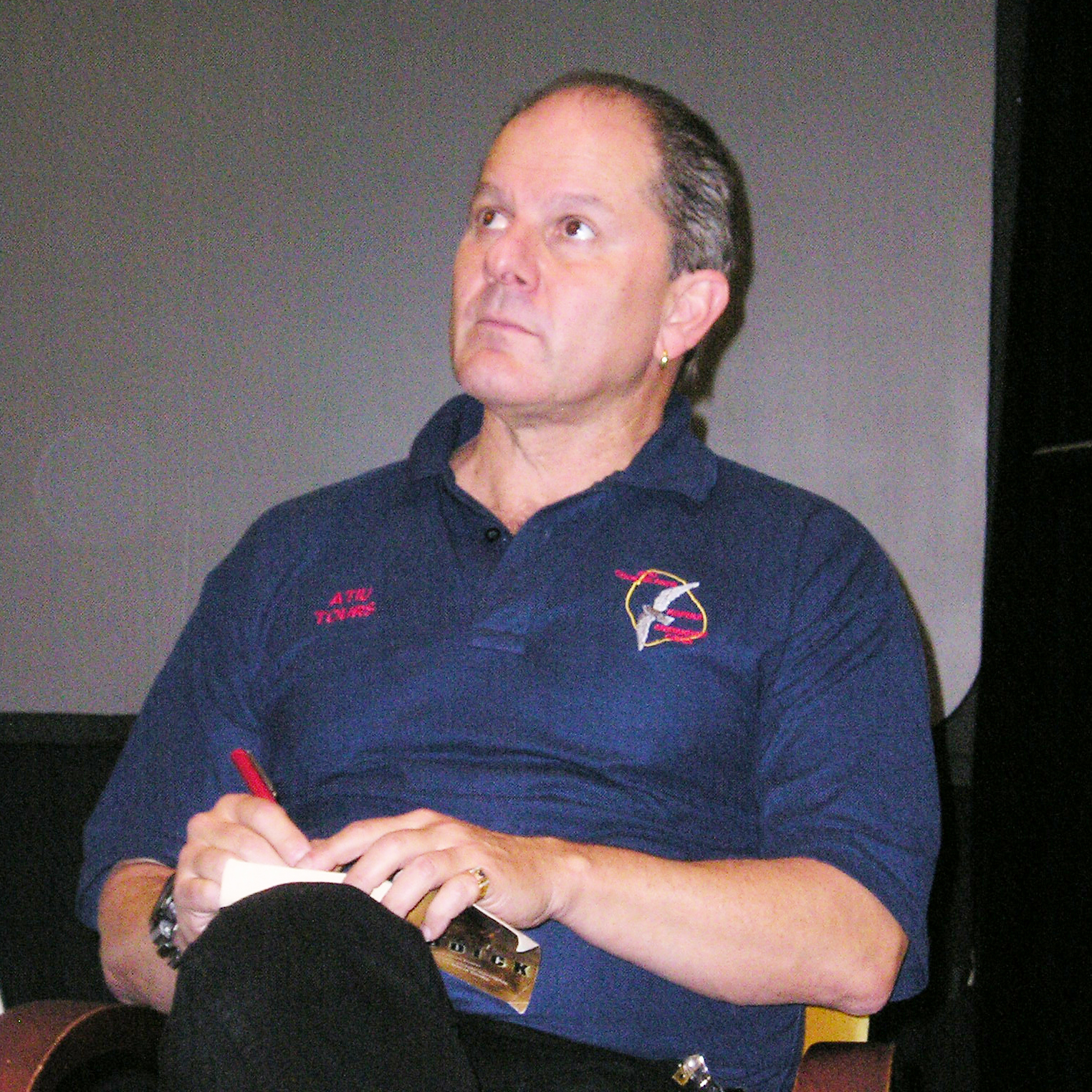
Ghostwriter Alan Dean Foster, pictured in 2007

In the United Kingdom, the novelization was published by Sphere Books, and featured cover art by John Berkey. Sphere reportedly paid $225,000 for the British publishing rights.

By February 1977, still three months before the film was released, the novelization sold out its initial print run of 500,000 copies. In the next three months, Ballantine had sold 3.5 million copies. The novel's massive success contributed somewhat to the popularity of the film. Some later editions contain sixteen pages of full-color photos from the motion picture.

Later editions of the novelization were published under altered titles to reflect the retitling of the film, such as Star Wars: A New Hope, and Star Wars IV: A New Hope.

== Differences from the film ==
The words that open each Star Wars film, "A long time ago in a galaxy far, far away...." are absent from the novelization, substituted by the similar "Another galaxy, another time."

In place of how the film uses its famous opening crawl to describe the events that had just happened when the film starts, the novelization includes a prologue explaining the political backstory called "From the First Saga: Journal of the Whills" (referencing the title of Lucas' first story outline for the saga). It contains the first reference to the Emperor's name, Palpatine, though his description is somewhat at odds with his depiction as a Sith Master in The Empire Strikes Back, Return of the Jedi, and the prequel trilogy. Lucas later explained that the first film was written in the era of Richard Nixon, when the story was intended to explore "how a democracy turns itself over to a dictator—not how a dictator takes over a democracy." The book's introduction reads:

Aided and abetted by restless, power-hungry individuals within the government, and the massive organs of commerce, the ambitious Senator Palpatine caused himself to be elected President of the Republic. He promised to reunite the disaffected among the people and to restore the remembered glory of the Republic. Once secure in office he declared himself Emperor, shutting himself away from the populace. Soon he was controlled by the very assistants and boot-lickers he had appointed to high office, and the cries of the people for justice did not reach his ears.

Several other portions of the novel deviate from the film, including scenes that were filmed but not inserted into the final cut of the movie. Most notable of these are scenes with Luke Skywalker and his friends at Tosche Station on Tatooine. Also included is the scene with Jabba the Hutt that was re-inserted in the Special Edition of the film; however, in this novelization he is written as a fat biped with an ugly, "shaggy skull" and "jowels" that shake with his head, and he has scars that are a sign of his ferocious reputation in combat. This differs both from the script's version of Jabba (which is described as a creature with "eyes on stalks"), and the giant slug creature that finally appeared in Return of the Jedi.

There are various small details throughout, such as Luke's squadron in the Death Star assault being Blue Squadron, thus Luke's call sign is "Blue Five" instead of "Red Five". The official term for "droid" in the novelization is "mechanical", and it is implied that "droid" is a slang term, spelled with an apostrophe preceding it as a contraction of the word "android". Additionally, the word "rebel" is never capitalized, unlike its appearance when describing the Rebel Alliance in the film's opening crawl. The novel and various merchandising tie-ins also refer to Darth Vader as a Sith Lord, although he is not referred to as such in the movie. The term is used in a deleted scene from the original film in which General Tagge describes Darth Vader as a Sith Lord during the Death Star meeting. The term was not mentioned in the films until 1999's Episode I: The Phantom Menace.

In the novel, the Imperial stormtroopers board the Tantive IV through the ceiling rather than blasting through a door. Luke's landspeeder has an enclosed cockpit, unlike its open cockpit in the film. Obi-Wan Kenobi lives in a cave instead of a hut, and he smokes a pipe. The scene in the Mos Eisley cantina where Obi-Wan defends Luke involves three aliens, as opposed to two in the film, and Obi-Wan cuts one of them in half. Chewbacca is described as having bright, yellow eyes. Admiral Motti, the man Darth Vader chokes in the conference room in the movie, is not included in the novel, instead replaced by a character named Romodi, who has severe facial scarring. The call sign of the stormtroopers guarding the Millennium Falcon is THX-1138 (referencing Lucas' directorial debut), as opposed to TK-421 in the film. Grand Moff Tarkin is present during Princess Leia's torture. The destruction of Alderaan is not described in the book, nor does Obi-Wan sense it. Kenobi's death is also different in the book, in that Vader succeeds in defeating him during their lightsaber duel, while in the film Obi-Wan allows Vader to strike him down to provide a diversion for Luke and his allies to escape.

The order of events in the final dogfight over the Death Star is somewhat different. In the novel, Blue Leader (whose film equivalent is Red Leader) makes two bombing runs down the trench toward the exhaust port. In the film, he only manages to make one before being shot down. In the film, Wedge's X-wing fighter is damaged by Darth Vader and his wingmen, forcing him to leave the battle, and then Biggs is killed outright by the pursuing Vader and his fighters. In the novelization, Biggs is killed, and then Wedge must retreat, due to a malfunction caused in the battle with the enemy fighters. At the end of the novel, in addition to Han Solo and Luke receiving medals, Leia also gives Chewbacca a medal, though she must strain to do so.

At one point, Han mentions a Corellian friend named Tocneppil (Lippincot backwards). This is a reference to Charles Lippincott, the mastermind of the Star Wars marketing campaign. The book also features a singular reference to a duck by Obi-Wan, which leads Luke to ask, "What's a duck?". In The Phantom Menace, ducklike birds appear swimming on Naboo, and there is also a reference to the species in the form of the phrase "sitting ducks".

== Sequels ==
After the massive success of the film, Alan Dean Foster wrote a novel called Splinter of the Mind's Eye, which was originally commissioned by George Lucas for the purpose of being filmed as a low-budget sequel, as a fallback plan in the event that Star Wars did not do well. It was published in 1978, a year after the movie's release. This made it the first full-length original novel to be published in the Star Wars expanded universe. The next official novelization of a Star Wars movie was The Empire Strikes Back by Donald F. Glut in 1980.
