= Languages in Star Wars =

Fictional languages and scripts

The Aurebesh alphabet is the primary constructed writing system seen throughout the franchise.

Star Wars, a space opera franchise created by George Lucas, features various fictional languages throughout its setting. The lingua franca of the franchise is known in-universe as Galactic Basic, which refers to the language of the film or work itself, be it English or a language into which that work was dubbed or translated.

Characters often speak languages other than Basic, notably Shyriiwook spoken by Chewbacca and other Wookiees, droidspeak spoken by R2-D2 and BB-8, Ewokese spoken by Ewoks, and Huttese spoken by Jabba the Hutt. None of these language names appear in the Star Wars films themselves.

The fictional languages were approached as sound design and developed largely by Ben Burtt, sound designer for both the original and prequel trilogies of films. He created alien dialogue out of the sounds of primarily non-English languages, such as Quechua, Haya, and Tibetan. This methodology was also used in The Force Awakens by Sara Forsberg. Lucas also insisted that written text throughout the films look as dissimilar from the English alphabet as possible, and constructed alphabets were developed.

Critics contend the languages constructed for the films compared unfavorably with the true constructed languages found in some other fictional works. The usage of heavily accented English for extraterrestrials characters was also criticized as contributing to the suggestion of racial stereotypes.

== Development ==
Language development was approached as sound design and was handled by Ben Burtt, sound designer for both the original and prequel trilogies. He created the alien dialogue out of existing non-English language phrases and their sounds, such as Quechua for Greedo in the original Star Wars film and Haya for the character Nien Nunb in Return of the Jedi. He also used English, as in the original Star Wars, where he synthesized originally English dialogue from a Western film until it sounded alien. Burtt said of the process: "It usually meant doing some research and finding an existing language or several languages which were exotic and interesting, something that our audience — 99 percent of them — would never understand."

This methodology to create the sound of alien languages was carried into production of The Force Awakens. Director J. J. Abrams asked Sara Forsberg, who lacked a professional background in linguistics but created the viral video series "What Languages Sound Like to Foreigners" on YouTube, to develop alien dialogue spoken by Indonesian actor Yayan Ruhian. Forsberg was asked to listen to "Euro-Asian languages", and she drew from Gujarati, Hindi, and other Asian languages as well as Indonesian and Sundanese, Ruhian's native language. She also listened to languages she did not understand to better structure the words and sentences to sound believable.

During production of the prequel trilogy, Lucas insisted that written text throughout the films look as dissimilar from the English alphabet as possible and strongly opposed English-looking characters in screens and signage. In developing typefaces for use in Episode II – Attack of the Clones, including Mandalorian and Geonosian scripts, graphic artist Philip Metschan created alphabets that did not have twenty-six letters like the English alphabet.

== Galactic Basic ==
Galactic Basic, often simply Basic, is the language of the work itself — in-universe, it is the lingua franca predominantly spoken by the inhabitants of the galaxy.

=== Accents ===
Lucas intended to balance American accents and British accents between the heroes and villains of the original film. He also strove to keep accents "very neutral", noting Alec Guinness and Peter Cushing's particular British accents, which he perceived as "sort of mid-Atlantic neutral accents". In critical commentary on Episode I – The Phantom Menace, Patricia Williams of The Nation felt there was a correlation between accent and social class, noting that Jedi speak with "crisp British accents" while the "graceful conquered women of the Naboo" and "white slaves" such as Anakin and Shmi Skywalker "speak with the brusque, determined innocence of middle-class Americans".

To decide on the sound of Nute Gunray, a Neimoidian character portrayed by Silas Carson, Lucas and Rick McCallum listened to actors from different countries reading Carson's lines. Eventually, they chose a heavily Thai-accented English, and Carson rerecorded the dialogue to mimic the Thai actor's accent. Gunray's accent was described by critics to be "Hollywood Oriental" that contributed to criticism of Gunray as an Asian stereotype. Watto's accent was similarly criticized as lending to anti-Semitic and anti-Arab connotations.

=== Non-standard Basic ===
"When gone am I, the last of the Jedi will you be."

— an example of Yoda's unusual word order from Return of the Jedi

Yoda characteristically speaks a non-standard syntax of Basic, primarily constructing sentences in object–subject–verb word order rare in natural languages. This sentence construction is cited as a "clever device for making him seem very alien" and characterizes his dialogue as "vaguely riddle-like, which adds to his mystique". This tendency is noted to be written for an English-speaking audience; the word order is retained in Estonian subtitles, where it is grammatical but unusual and emphatic, and Yoda's dialogue is in subject–object–verb word order in Czech dubs.

Gungan characters, notably Jar Jar Binks, speak in a heavily accented Basic dialect critics described as a "Caribbean-flavored pidgin", "a pidgin mush of West African, Caribbean and African-American linguistic styles", "very like Jamaican patois, albeit a notably reductive, even infantilized sort", and suggestive of stereotypical African-American culture. This was cited as a trait that led to criticism of the Gungan species as a racially offensive stereotype or caricature.

=== Aurebesh ===
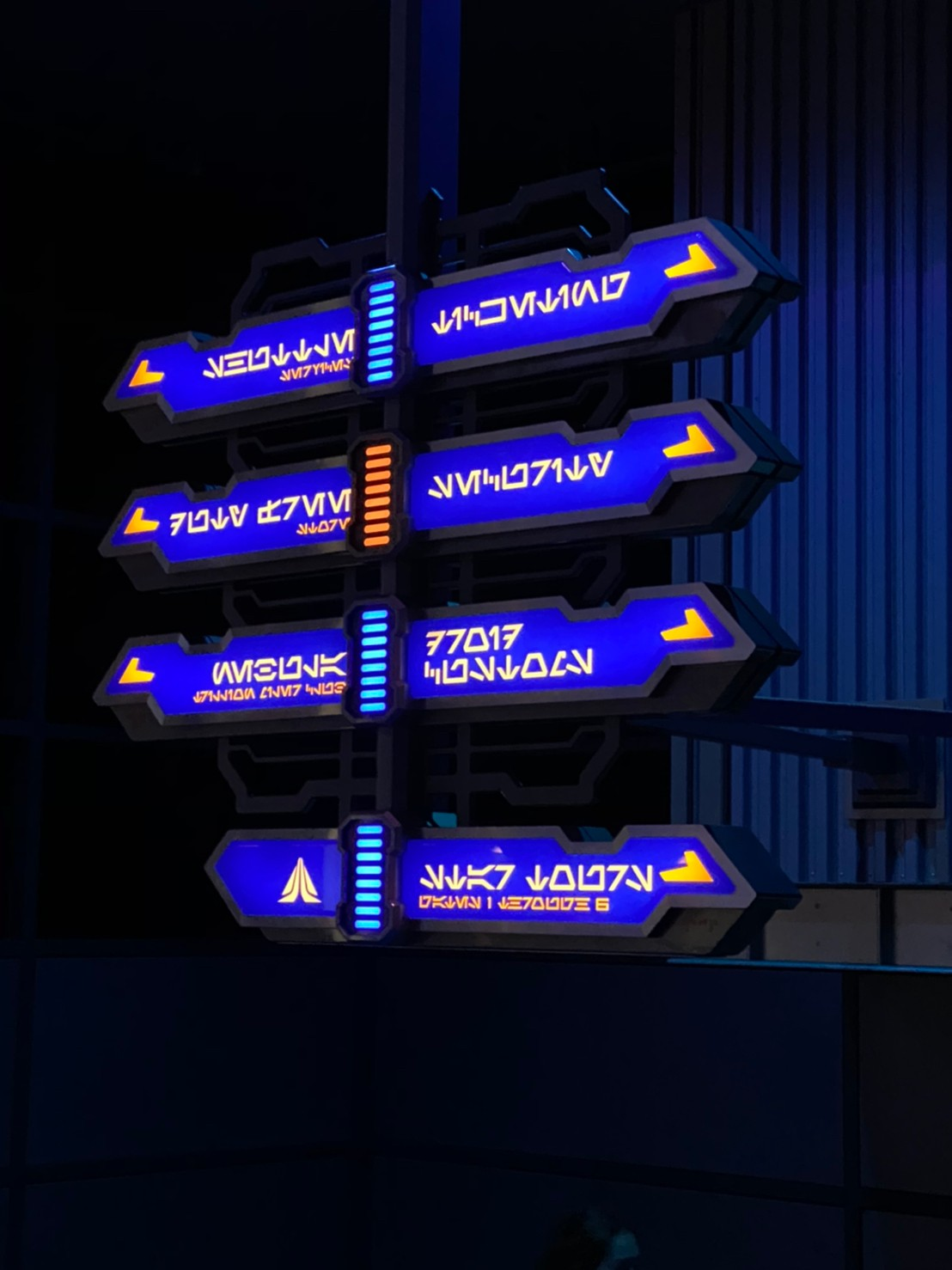
Aurebesh signage at Star Tours, in Tokyo Disneyland

Aurebesh is an alphabet used to represent spoken Galactic Basic (i.e. English) and is the most commonly seen form of written language in the Star Wars franchise. Its letters correspond to each English letter, plus certain English digraphs (pair of characters).

The alphabet was based on shapes designed by Joe Johnston for the original trilogy, which are briefly featured in screen displays in Return of the Jedi. Johnston's design, called Star Wars 76, was used to create a font and again used in Attack of the Clones by Metschan, who incorporated the font alongside the later Aurebesh version used in the spin-off products. The 2004 DVD release of the original trilogy replaced Latin characters with Aurebesh.

In the early 1990s, Stephen Crane, art director at West End Games, became intrigued with the shapes as they appeared on the Death Star. He sought to develop them into an alphabet to be used in West End Games' licensed Star Wars products, primarily to allow players to render their characters' names, and received permission from Lucasfilm to do so as long as it was presented as one of many alphabets in the Star Wars galaxy, not the sole and exclusive alphabet. After copying the letters from screenshots by hand, he standardized the letters based on shapes similar to the Eurostile font. He named and assigned a value to each letter, and derived the name "Aurebesh" from the names of the first two letters: aurek and besh. Once Crane completed the alphabet, Lucasfilm requested a copy to distribute to other licensees.

In anticipation of the December 2015 release of The Force Awakens, Google Translate added a feature to render text into Aurebesh in November 2015, which was subsequently removed in February 2016.

== Other languages ==
=== Dathomiri ===
Archaic speech samples are found in The Clone Wars season 3. Mother Talzin, a Witch of Dathomir associated with the Nightsisters, is found speaking Dathomiri while possessing Darth Maul on Dathomir.

In April 1994, the then unidentified language first appeared in Dave Wolverton's The Courtship of Princess Leia, when the young Teneniel Djo unleashes a Spell of Storm on Luke Skywalker and Prince Isolder of Hapes. Through retroactive continuity, Ewoks: The Battle for Endor (a 1985 made-for-TV film) was the language's first real appearance. In this story, Charal – a witch later retconned as a Nightsister – was seen incanting spells over a crystal oscillator.

=== Binary (Language) ===
Binary is a language consisting of beeps and other synthesized sounds used by some droid characters, such as R2-D2, BB-9E and BB-8. Burtt created R2-D2's dialogue in the original Star Wars with an ARP 2600 analog synthesizer and by processing his own vocalizations via other effects. In The Force Awakens, BB-8's dialogue was created by manipulating the voices of Bill Hader and Ben Schwartz with a talkbox running through a sound effects application on an iPad. Although binary is unintelligible to the viewing audience, many characters in the Star Wars films are able to understand it, most notably Luke Skywalker.

=== Ewokese ===
The Ewoks of the forest moon of Endor speak a "primitive dialect" of one of the more than six million other forms of communication that C-3PO is familiar with. Ben Burtt, Return of the Jedi's sound designer, created the Ewok language Ewokese.

On Return of the Jedi DVD commentary track, Burtt identified the language that he heard in the BBC documentary as Kalmyk Oirat, a tongue spoken by the isolated nomadic Kalmyks. He describes how, after some research, he identified an 80-year-old Kalmyk refugee. He recorded her telling folk stories in her native language, and then used the recordings as a basis for sounds that became the Ewok language and were performed by voice actors who imitated the old woman's voice in different styles. For the scene in which C-3PO speaks Ewokese, actor Anthony Daniels worked with Burtt and invented words, based on the Kalmyk recordings. In a previous scene as C-3PO levitates, the Ewoks also spoke words (such as "look", "this", and "beautiful") of Tagalog.

Marcia Calkovsky of the University of Lethbridge holds that Tibetan language contributed to Ewok speech along with Kalmyk, starting the story from attempts to use language samples of Native Americans and later turning to nine Tibetan women living in the San Francisco area, as well as one Kalmyk woman. The story behind these languages' choices is referenced in Burtt's 1989 telephone interview, and many of the used Tibetan phrases translated. The initial prayer Ewoks address to C-3PO is the beginning of a Tibetan Buddhist prayer for the benefit of all sentient beings and/or brahmavihāras (or apramāṇas). There is also the second quarter of a refuge prayer. People of the Tibetan diaspora were puzzled, as many phrases they understood did not correlate to events on screen.

=== Ghor ===
Ghor is the language of Ghorman, featured in the second season of Andor. A specific language for Ghorman was created to emphasize its sense of community, insularity, pride, and desire to maintain control over itself. Because French actors were cast for Ghorman character, the language was developed by Marina Tyndall based on French and French phonology. Marion Deprez, a French dialogue coach, also contributed to its development. There are two writing systems: Ghorelle (High Ghor) and Dixian (Low Ghor), named after graphic designers Elle McKee and Lauren Dix, respectively.

=== Rodian ===
In the original Star Wars film, Greedo speaks an unspecified alien language understood by Han Solo; it was later identified as Rodian. Bruce Mannheim described Greedo as speaking Southern Quechua in "morphologically well-formed" phrases with sentences ultimately meaningless. Allen Sonnefrank, a Quechua speaker and linguistic anthropology student at University of California, Berkeley, claimed Lucasfilm contacted him to record Quechua dialogue for the film. He was told the dialogue was to be played backward for the film. Sonnefrank refused to record the dialogue, feeling it to be a "potentially exploitative move best made by one whose first language was Quechua, if at all".

=== Huttese ===
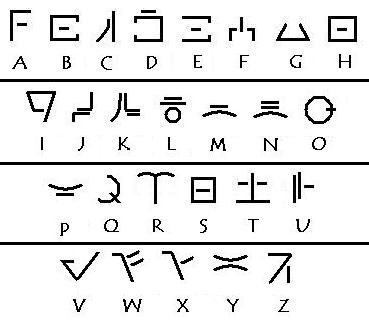
"Jabba's alphabet" from a Star Wars-themed Pizza Hut box

A language based on the Quechuan languages, Huttese was developed by Ben Burtt and Larry Ward, a linguist from University of California, Berkeley. Ward also provided Jabba's voice in Return of the Jedi. Huttese is a lingua franca in the Star Wars universe. It is spoken by many groups and species, on Nal Hutta, Nar Shaddaa, Tatooine and other worlds in and around Hutt Space, the region of the galaxy under the Hutts' sphere of influence. In the Star Wars Legends continuity, the area covers former Hutt Empire dominions.

It is spoken in the films by both non-humans (Jabba the Hutt, Watto, Sebulba and others) and humans. Notably The Max Rebo Band communicate and sing in Huttese. Many Huttese alphabets are featured through the franchise, most notably the Boonta alphabet and Nal Huttese. The one considered "canonical" by fans is one found on promotional Pizza Hut pizza boxes.

=== Jawaese and Jawa trade language ===
The Jawas, also found on Tatooine, speak in a high-pitched, squeaky voice. To speak to others of their species, along with speech, they emit a smell showing their emotions. When trading droids and dealing with non-Jawas, they speak without the smell because many consider the smell "foul". A famous exclamation in Jawaese is "Utinni!", as screamed by a Jawa to the others in A New Hope, shortly after blasting R2-D2.

=== Kenari language ===
The Kenari language spoken in the third episode of Andor is a blend of Portuguese, Spanish, and Hungarian (Magyar).

=== Mando'a ===
The Mandalorian script was created for displays in Attack of the Clones.

A written form of the Mandalorian language was developed by Metschan for the display screens of Jango Fett's ship Slave I in Attack of the Clones, and it was later reused in The Clone Wars and Rebels. Composer Jesse Harlin, needing lyrics for the choral work he wanted for the 2005 Republic Commando video game, invented a spoken form, intending it to be an ancient language. It was named Mando'a and extensively expanded by Karen Traviss, author of the Republic Commando novel series.

Mando'a is identified as a primarily spoken, agglutinative language lacking grammatical gender in nouns and pronouns. The language is also identified as lacking a passive voice, primarily speaking in an active voice. It is often vague and described as having three grammatical tenses (present, past, and future). Its speakers typically do not use the tenses other than the present. The language is described as having a mutually intelligible dialect called "Concordian" spoken on the planet Concord Dawn, as stated in Traviss's novels Order 66 and 501st, and a dialect spoken on Mandalore's moon Concordia is heard in "The Mandalore Plot", a season two episode of The Clone Wars.

=== Sith ===
The Sith language, intended to be spoken by Sith characters, was created by Ben Grossblatt for the Book of Sith, published in February 2012. Language development and a writing system began in November 2010. Grossblatt sought to create a pronounceable language that was not "cartoonish" and "would conform to the patterns of principles of [human] [sic] language". He felt that it needed to "feel martial and mystical" and be a "suitable, aesthetically-pleasing vehicle for communication". He intended the language's sound as "tough—but not barbarous" and as "convey[ing] a kind of confident, elegant cruelty". To achieve "formal, quasi-military" and "imposing, undeniable" qualities, he preferred closed syllables, creating brisk and choppy words. The language is constructed as agglutinative.

=== Shyriiwook ===
Shyriiwook, also known as Wookieespeak, is a language consisting largely of roars and growls spoken by the Wookiee species, notably Chewbacca. Non-Wookiee characters are capable of understanding Shyriiwook, such as Chewbacca's friend Han Solo. Chewbacca's dialogue was created from walrus, camel, bear, and badger recordings from Burtt's personal sound library. One of the most prominent elements was an American black bear living in Happy Hollow Park & Zoo, San Jose, California. The sounds were mixed in different ratios to create different roars.

=== Tusken Raiders ===
Tatooine's Tusken Raiders use a language difficult for non-Tuskens to understand, although the Mandalorian in The Mandalorian was able to understand and respond in their sign language. According to the Knights of the Old Republic video game, they speak a language of their own. In the game, a droid named HK-47 assists the player in communicating with the Tusken Raiders. They commonly utter roars and battle cries when seen in public.

The script for The Mandalorian episode "Chapter 5: The Gunslinger" stated that the Mandalorian and a Tusken Raider communicate using a sign language, and a hearing member of the crew who knew sign language encouraged the production to look for a deaf person to consult on the sign language and play the Tusken Raider. Troy Kotsur was cast in the role, and he developed the Tusken Sign Language based on the environment and culture of the Tusken Raiders rather than using American Sign Language. The hand shapes used for the language were kept simple. For example, the sign name for the Mandalorian is a flat handshape based on the letter M to outline the gaps in a Mandalorian helmet and the sign name for Grogu is one's hands on either side of the head to indicate big ears. The Tusken Raiders also converse in Tusken Sign Language in The Book of Boba Fett.

=== Ubese ===
Ubese is a language heard in a Return of the Jedi scene where a disguised Princess Leia bargains with Jabba the Hutt through C-3PO as a translator. Leia repeats the same Ubese phrase three times, translated differently in subtitles and by C-3PO each time. David J. Peterson, a constructed language creator, cited his attempt as a young fan to reconcile this apparent impossibility as an example of how even casual fans may notice errors in fictional constructed languages. He identified Ubese as a "sketch" of a language rather than a fully developed language and categorized it as a "fake language" intended to "give the impression of a real language in some context without actually being a real language". Ultimately, he was critical of Ubese as "poorly constructed and not worthy of serious consideration".

== Critical commentary ==
Ben Zimmer labeled the method of language construction in Star Wars "a far cry" from that of constructed languages like Klingon, Na'vi, and Dothraki, and he described the use of language as "never amount[ing] to more than a sonic pastiche".

Linguistic anthropologist Jim Wilce summarized analyses of language in Star Wars conducted through the Society for Linguistic Anthropology's electronic mailing list. David Samuels described the approach to language as instrumental and compared the films to a Summer Institute of Linguistics convention, in which "there are no untranslatable phrases, and everyone can understand everyone else", and pointed out that the "idea that the Force is something that would be understood differently in the context of different grammars is never broached". Hal Schiffmann made five observations about language in Star Wars: all humans speak English and no other real-world language, there is "mutual passive bilingualism" in which characters speaking different languages understand one another, non-human creatures may have their own languages but are translated by C-3PO, certain non-English vocalizations serve to confuse or amuse the audience rather than serve as language, even non-English speaking characters are expected to understand English. Zimmer supported Schiffmann's claim that untranslated alien languages are not representations of real languages by pointing to the film's script, which describes the language of the Jawas as "a queer, unintelligible language" and that of the Tusken Raiders as "a coarse, barbaric language". Wilce also pointed out discussion on the usage of real non-English to create the "Otherness" of characters such as Jabba the Hutt, Greedo, and the Ewoks.

== See also ==
- Alien language in science fiction
