= James Kahn =

American author

James Kahn (born December 30, 1947) is an American medical specialist and writer, best known for his novelization of Return of the Jedi. Born in Chicago, Kahn received a degree in medical studies from the University of Chicago. His post-graduate training, specializing in Emergency Medicine, was completed at USC–LA County Hospital and UCLA. His original work includes three novels in the New World series: World Enough, and Time (1980), Time's Dark Laughter (1982), and Timefall (1987). As well as Return of the Jedi, he wrote the novelizations of the films Poltergeist and Indiana Jones and the Temple of Doom. He has also written for well-known television series such as Melrose Place and Star Trek: The Next Generation. He was the producer of Melrose Place from 1996 to 1998.

== Early life ==
Kahn was born in Chicago in 1947, and began playing the guitar at age 12. He graduated from Maine Township High School West in 1965; then attended the University of Chicago, where he majored in biology, drew a draft lottery number of 3, became involved in the anti-Vietnam War movement, participated in the 1968 Democratic Convention riots, and studied with the Byronic scholar Jerome McGann. When, during his fifth year in the college, his short story, "The Box", won second place in a U. of C. contest, one of the judges, Daryl Hine, sent Kahn's story to Playboy magazine, which bought it and published it in March 1971 – marking Kahn's debut as a professional writer.

== Career ==
Kahn went to medical school at the University of Chicago, as well, graduating in 1974. In 1973 he had another short story, "Mobius Trip," published in the short-lived, Chicago-based magazine Gallery. He did a medical internship at the University of Wisconsin at Madison, then took a year-long hiatus during which he wrote his first novel, Diagnosis: Murder, which was later published by Carlyle Press, now defunct. He proceeded to do the first year of a Residency in Emergency Medicine at L.A.County Hospital/USC then took off another year in his training program to work various emergency departments around Los Angeles. He finished his Residency training at UCLA, where he helped create the residency program in Emergency Medicine, and subsequently became part of the group of specialists who created and then ran the emergency department at St. John's Hospital in Santa Monica, California.

It was during this period that he wrote his science fiction trilogy – World Enough, and Time; Time's Dark Laughter; and Timefall – the first two published by Del Rey Publishing, the third by St. Martin's Press, which later published his medical thriller, The Echo Vector.

While working at St. John's Hospital, he and others in the emergency department there were contacted by Kathleen Kennedy and Melissa Matheson soliciting technical assistance in the resuscitation of an alien. Kahn and others were invited to join the cast and crew in the production of the Steven Spielberg film E.T. the Extra-Terrestrial (at that time tentatively titled A Boy's Life). In the film, Kahn plays the doctor who confirms E.T.'s death. While on the set, Kahn gave a copy of his novel, World Enough, and Time, to Spielberg – which resulted in Kahn getting the assignment to novelize the movie Poltergeist, then in post-production.

Kahn did several more novelizations after that – Return of the Jedi, Indiana Jones and the Temple of Doom, The Goonies and Poltergeist II. During this period he also began to get television work, writing first for St. Elsewhere, and later, E/R – a sitcom about an emergency department starring Elliott Gould and Mary MacDonald, in which Kahn created the character of a teen orderly named Ace, played by a young George Clooney.

Kahn wrote primarily for television for the next 20 years. Among the series he worked on were Family Medical Center, Star Trek: The Next Generation, Beyond Reality, TekWar (created by William Shatner), Medicine Ball, Xena: Warrior Princess, Melrose Place (which he also co-executive produced in its last years), Star Trek: Voyager (also Supervising Producer) and All My Children (for which he and the writing staff were Emmy-nominated).

Later, under the tutelage of singer-songwriter Kate Wallace, and music producer/multi-instrumentalist David West, he focused more on writing music, releasing the Americana/folk CD Waterline in 2011, followed by the music video/short film Dolores Quits Dancing, the first song from his second album, Roadhouse Full of Blues (set for release in 2012).

== Discography ==
=== Studio albums ===
- Waterline (self-released, 2011)
- Roadhouse Full of Blues (2012)

== Selected bibliography ==
- Diagnosis: Murder
- The Echo Vector (1987)

=== New World series ===
1. World Enough, and Time (1980)
2. Time's Dark Laughter (1982)
3. Timefall (1987)

=== Novelizations ===
==== Star Wars ====
- Star Wars Episode VI: Return of the Jedi (1983)

==== Indiana Jones ====
- Indiana Jones and the Temple of Doom (1984)

==== Poltergeist ====
1. Poltergeist (1982)
2. Poltergeist II: The Other Side (1986)

==== The Goonies ====
- The Goonies (1985)

=== Short stories ===
- The Box (Playboy, March, 1971)
- Mobius Trip (Gallery, 1973)

== See also ==
- List of horror fiction authors
