= V-wing =

There have been several vehicles in the Star Wars Universe designated V-wing:

- V-wing starfighter: Starfighter mass-produced during the Clone Wars.
- V-wing airspeeder: Airspeeder that first saw service with the New Republic at the Battle of Mon Calamari.
- V-wing speeder transport: Orbital-capable transport that could carry up to four V-wing Airspeeders.
