= Star Wars: Attack Squadrons =

- Developer: Area 52 Games
- Publisher: Disney Interactive Studios
- Series: Star Wars
- Engine: Unity
- Platform: Web browser
- Genre: Action
- Mode: Multiplayer

Star Wars: Attack Squadrons is a cancelled freemium multiplayer space combat action video game developed by Area 52 Games, originally intended to be published by Disney Interactive Studios and licensed by LucasArts for web browsers, developed with Unity.

Star Wars: Attack Squadrons was announced by Disney Interactive Studios on December 17, 2013. A closed beta period began in North America on January 14, 2014. On May 23, 2014, it was announced that following the beta test, the decision was made not to go forward with the game. A similar game, Star Wars: Squadrons, was released on October 2, 2020.

== See also ==
- Star Wars: Squadrons
