= A-wing =

Starfighter in the Star Wars franchise

Kuat RZ-1 A-wing Interceptor
- An RZ-1 A-wing filming model used for Return of the Jedi
- First appearance: Return of the Jedi (1983)
- Created by: Ralph McQuarrie

Information
- Affiliation: Rebel Alliance; New Republic; Resistance
- Made by: Kuat Systems Engineering
- Auxiliary vehicles: Ejector seat

General characteristics
- Class: Interception starfighter
- Armaments: RZ-1/RZ-2: Laser cannons (2); Concussion missile launchers (2); 12 missiles total; RZ-1T: Laser cannons (2)
- Defenses: Deflector shield generator; Armor plating; Sensor jammer
- Maximum speed: RZ-1; 5,100 G (maximum acceleration); 1,300 km/h (808 mph; maximum atmospheric speed); 120 MGLT (megalight per hour; subluminal speed); 1.0 HCR (hyperdrive class rating; superluminal speed); RZ-2; 5,200 G (maximum acceleration); 1,350 km/h (839 mph; maximum atmospheric speed); 125 MGLT (megalight per hour; subluminal speed); 1.0 HCR (hyperdrive class rating; superluminal speed)
- Propulsion: Sublight engines (2); Hyperdrive motivators (2)
- Power: Fusion reactors (2)
- Length: RZ-1: 6.9 meters; RZ-2: 7.682 meters
- Width: RZ-1: 4.47 meters; RZ-2: 4.623 meters
- Height: RZ-1: 2.47 meters; RZ-2: 2.016 meters
- Population volume: 1 pilot

Kuat RZ-1 A-wing Interceptor are starfighters in the Star Wars franchise. Designed and manufactured by Kuat Systems Engineering, they are the fastest ship in the Rebel Fleet (not including hyperspace travel). The A-Wing was conceived for high-speed surgical strikes, deep reconnaissance, and escort fighter duty.

A-wings first appear in Return of the Jedi (1983) and later in numerous Star Wars materials and productions. It gained popularity through its depiction in several video games, and since 1985 the A-wing has been merchandised by several companies. They are the fastest vessels in the Star Wars canon, with the advantage of being the smallest hyperspace drive-equipped craft without relying on a carrier, allowing the vessel to extricate itself from a losing battle or to escape hostile territory after performing an attack.

== Appearances ==
RZ-1 A-wings from Green Squadron participate in the climactic Battle of Endor depicted in Return of the Jedi (1983). At Endor, an A-wing piloted by Arvel Crynyd (Hilton McRae) crashes into the bridge of the Super Star Destroyer Executor, resulting in the Executor crashing out of control into the second Death Star. In addition to McRae, two women recorded A-wing cockpit footage; one of the actors was cut, and the other was dubbed over by a male actor.

A-wings later appear in various Star Wars Expanded Universe television shows, books, and games. Some Expanded Universe material says Jan Dodonna created the A-wing based on his analysis of the role of speed in the Battle of Yavin, the climactic battle in Star Wars (1977). Later material, such as the Star Wars Rebels television series, depicts the starfighters in use before the events of Star Wars.

The A-wings of Phoenix Squadron play an important role in Rebels' second season (2015–2016). Rebels producers used the A-wing in part because the ship was not used much in Return of the Jedi The fighter's presence in the cartoon was meant to show that different groups used different craft to fight the Empire. The series's episodes "The Holocrons of Fate" and "Twin Suns" also feature the two-seater RZ-1T trainer, a training spacecraft used by the rebels to train recruits. The RZ-1T also appears in the novel Battlefront II: Inferno Squad.

The RZ-1 A-Wing is based on the R-22 A-Wing, also made by Kuat Systems Engineering.

A later variant, the RZ-2 A-wing, features in Star Wars Battlefront II and in Star Wars: The Last Jedi. It is a bigger spacecraft used by the Resistance against the First Order.

== Concept and design ==
Ralph McQuarrie's production art for the A-wing. The A-wings in Star Wars Rebels use McQuarrie's alternative blue-and-white color scheme.

The A-wing was one of two new Rebel Alliance starfighters created for Return of the Jedi. It was dubbed the A fighter because it was the first of the two designs created. Ralph McQuarrie's production paintings of A-wing starfighters were completed after filming and displayed alternative blue markings.

Joe Johnston designed the ship, Wesley Seeds and Lorne Peterson of Industrial Light & Magic built the model, apparently based on the kitbashed fuselage of a model Grumman F-14 Tomcat, and its pilot figure is based on a World War I German airman. A battle-damaged engine "wing" was snapped into place to represent Arvel Crynyd's damaged fighter as it crashed into the Executor.

McQuarrie's alternative blue-and-white coloring was used for the craft's appearance in Rebels. Photographs from the filming of Star Wars: The Last Jedi show an A-wing on the film set. Screen Rant suggests the A-wing seen in the photographs evokes some of McQuarrie's interpretation of the design, such as the blaster cannon shape and the presence of additional ports in the cockpit.

== Depiction ==
According to Star Wars canon, the A-wing is first produced by Kuat Systems Engineering, which had built the Delta-7 starfighter for the Jedi Order. With the Jedi eradicated (as depicted in Star Wars: Episode III – Revenge of the Sith) and the Delta-7 nearly impossible for non-Jedi to pilot, Kuat designed a new starfighter, the R-22 A-wing, in hopes the Galactic Empire would purchase it. While impressed with prototypes of the R-22, the Empire instead went with the TIE fighter and forbade Kuat from mass-producing the A-wing. The prototypes are sold to the kingdom of Tammuz-an, which over a decade later sell them to the Rebel Alliance.

Rebel engineers make many alterations to the original R-22 design to produce the RZ-1 model as seen in Return of the Jedi. The original engines are swapped out for more powerful ones, while other major components are replaced with lightweight versions so a supraluminal hyperdrive can be added. The resulting fighter is faster than even the Empire's TIE interceptor. In combination with a powerful jammer and multi-spectral sensors, this makes the A-wing perfect for hit-and-run attacks, long-range patrols, and reconnaissance missions. Its two Borstel RG-9 laser cannons, mounted on special swivel mounts, can elevate or depress 60° vertically; some are modified for full 360° rotation but these have a greater chance to jam. However, engineers could not fit the A-wing with an astromech droid, which limits how many hyperspace coordinates it can carry. The lack of droid assistance also makes it challenging even for a being with Jedi-like reflexes to control a fighter so fast and maneuverable. Consequently, only the best Rebel pilots are allowed to fly the A-wing.

After the Empire is defeated, Kuat Systems Engineering make a number of improvements to the design to create the RZ-2 A-wing for the New Republic Defense Fleet. Even faster than the original, the RZ-2 requires less maintenance than the RZ-1, and the swivel mounts that allow its laser cannons to rotate 360° without the risk of jamming. Thanks to the New Republic's disarmament campaign, RZ-2s find their way into the Resistance, which like the Rebellion before allows only the best pilots to fly the A-wing.

== Impact ==
CinemaBlend said the A-wing received little attention after Return of the Jedi because no prominent characters pilot the craft. Kenner in 1985 released an A-wing pilot figure as part of its Power of the Force line, and it released a "magnificent" A-wing toy as part of the Star Wars: Droids line. Since then, the A-wing has been recreated as various other toys, models, and collectibles by companies that include Galoob, Hasbro, Model Products Corporation, Estes Industries, Lego, and Fantasy Flight Games.

Screen Rant said the A-wing gained popularity as a playable craft in the Star Wars: X-Wing space combat simulator (1993), which The Escapist said depicted the ship as "an excellent dogfighter". Subsequent video games that allowed players to pilot the A-wing also contributed to the ship's popularity. Blastr ranked the A-wing 16th on its list of the best Star Wars vehicles.

Prince Harry was photographed sitting in an A-wing cockpit during his and the Duke of Cambridge's April 2016 visit to the Star Wars: Episode VIII set. Responding to the photographs, various publications called the A-wing "iconic", an "unsung hero", "woefully underappreciated", and "a classic".

In 2018 a number of Star Wars starfighters - including the A-wing - had their aerodynamic abilities tested using the Autodesk Flow Design virtual wind tunnel program. Of those starfighters tested the A-wing was among the most aerodynamic designs of all with a drag coefficient of .17, though it was still worse than the real-life example of the F-4E Phantom with a .02 rating. These poor results were rationalized with the in-universe explanations that drag coefficient plays no role in space travel, and that Star Wars fighters can use repulsorlifts and deflector shields to give themselves better flight profiles.
