= Rebel Alliance =

Fictional military alliance in Star Wars

Alliance to Restore the Republic Rebel Alliance
- Star Wars organization
- Emblem of the Rebel Alliance
- First appearance: Star Wars: From the Adventures of Luke Skywalker (1976 novelization); Star Wars (1977 film)
- Last appearance: Andor (2025)

In-universe information
- Type: Stateless resistance movement; Pro-democratic republic coalition; Anti-imperialist movement; Self-determination movement; Doctrine of asymmetric warfare
- Founded: 2 BBY, officially formed after Declaration of Rebellion is broadcast galaxy-wide
- Defunct: 5 ABY, dissolved after the Battle of Jakku and reorganised into the New Republic
- Location: Alderaan, Atollon, Dantooine, Yavin, Hoth, Tureen VII, various other hidden bases
- Leader: Senator/Chancellor Mon Mothma; Senator Bail Organa; Alliance High Command
- Key people: Queen Breha Organa (until 0 BBY); Princess Leia Organa; Fleet Admiral Gial Ackbar; General Lando Calrissian; Admiral Raddus; Jedi Knight/Commander Luke Skywalker; General Han Solo; General Hera Syndulla; General Jan Dodonna; General Crix Madine; Spymaster Ahsoka Tano; Luthen Rael; Kleya Marki; Alliance Cabinet
- Technologies: Pressurized rooms, medical droids
- Affiliations: Galactic Republic; Alliance Grand Army; Alliance Pathfinders; Alliance Starfleet Navy; Alliance Starfighter Corps; Jedi Purge Survivors; Clandestine cell systems
- Enemies: Galactic Empire
- Currency: Galactic Standard Credit (Imperial Dataries)
- Founding document: Declaration of Rebellion
- Official language: Basic

The Rebel Alliance (known formally in-universe as the Alliance to Restore the Republic), also known simply as the Rebellion, is a fictional organization in the Star Wars franchise. Created by George Lucas, the Alliance is depicted as a stateless coalition of rebel dissidents and defectors who oppose the Galactic Empire and its authoritarian rule. Its stated goal is to restore the previous Galactic Republic, which had been dissolved after its leader Palpatine seized absolute power and declared himself emperor. It is the main protagonistic faction of the original Star Wars trilogy and was inspired by anti-authoritarian and anti-imperialist movements, with Lucas citing the Viet Cong as a direct influence.

In the Star Wars universe, the rebel insurgency conducts covert operations on Imperial garrison worlds, utilizing a stateless strategy in conjunction with wolfpack-guerrilla warfare against the Imperial fleet throughout the galaxy. Capital ships are portrayed as having no place in the Rebellion, as they are logistically expensive to build, maintain, and crew. The Rebellion operates with limited manpower and resources, making hit-and-run attacks on high-value targets a priority. While the Empire labels all dissenters and rebels as extremists and terrorists in Imperial propaganda, the Alliance is depicted in various Star Wars media as a group of resilient freedom fighters, based on tolerance, self-empowerment, and hope for a better future, employing insurgency weapons and tactics.

The Rebel Alliance first appeared as the main protagonistic faction in the films A New Hope (1977), The Empire Strikes Back (1980) and Return of the Jedi (1983). The faction's origins were alluded to in Revenge of the Sith (2005), and its early activities are featured in the Disney XD television series Rebels, the anthology film Rogue One (2016), and the Disney+ series Andor.

== Development and influences ==
George Lucas has cited the Communist Viet Cong rebels (Note: Also known as the National Liberation Front) who fought against American Imperialism during the Vietnam War, as an inspiration for the Rebel Alliance. Like the Viet Cong, the Rebellion is depicted as a stateless, technologically inferior force employing asymmetric warfare, guerrilla tactics, jungle warfare, and hit-and-run attacks against a larger, better-equipped imperial power. The Galactic Empire serves as a parallel to the United States, which Lucas explicitly called the "American empire," as well as drawing parallels to the British and Roman empires. Lucas has also elaborated on the anti-authoritarian and anti-colonial themes in the Rebellions inspiration. The rebel leader Saw Gerrera created by George Lucas was directly inspired by the Argentinian marxist revolutionary Che Guevara. Gerrera's name itself is a "mnemonic riff" on Guevara's.

The series Andor draws explicit inspiration from the French Resistance against fascist German occupation during the Second World War; showrunner Tony Gilroy has said the production hired predominantly French actors to portray the people of Ghorman and built the invented Ghor language from French phonetics, drawing a deliberate line to the historical Resistance. The series depicts the early Rebel Alliance as a coalition of civilians, spies, and militants who gradually unite into a single rebellion, mirroring the fragmented, multi-factional nature of the historical Resistance. Historians Terrence G. Peterson and Meghan K. Roberts have compared Luthen Rael's strategic calculus to that of the FLN during the Algerian War, arguing both deliberately provoked disproportionate state repression to make that violence visible and mobilize broader support for their respective rebellions.

== Depiction ==
=== Origins ===
Note: All dates in this article are in the BBY/ABY format. This is a fictional in-universe dating system centred on the Battle of Yavin in Episode IV: A New Hope in which the first Death Star is destroyed. BBY is Before the Battle of Yavin; ABY is After the Battle of Yavin.

==== Founding members ====
- Senator Mon Mothma – Co-founder; current commander-in-chief
- Senator Bail Organa – Co-founder; early constituting member and head of the Alliance Council
  - Died during Episode IV: A New Hope, when the Death Star destroys Alderaan
- Senator Padmé Amidala – Co-founder; early constituting member. She died a few days after founding the Alliance. (While the scene from Revenge of the Sith was deleted from the film, the information was affirmed by other official sources. Scene still present on Disney+)
  - Died during Episode III: Revenge of the Sith while giving birth to twins Luke and Leia; the latter was adopted by Organa.

==== Early insurgency ====
Significant dates in the uprising are:

- 19 BBY - the Delegation of 2000 Senators which demanded Chancellor Palpatine to lay down his emergency powers; the Clone Wars end, the Jedi are purged, and Palpatine is declared Emperor ad infinitum. Most of these Senators disappear from public service.
- 5 BBY - the heist of the Imperial payroll vault on Aldhani. Proto-rebels including Cassian Andor steal 80 million credits to fund further anti-Imperial actions. The response was an over-reaction of imperialism and authoritarianism meant as deterrence, suppressing political discourse, dismantling grassroots democratic movements, and criminalizing dissent, failed; instead, every violent crackdown was met with radicalization, every assassination with retaliation, and Tarkin Doctrine only exponentially escalated insurrection.
- 2 BBY - Anti-Imperialism reaches its pinnacle. Mon Mothma's Senate speech condemning the Ghorman Massacre incident as genocide perpetrated by Emperor Palpatine; avoids numerous assassination attempts; the formal Declaration of Rebellion.

===== Delegation of 2000 (19 BBY) =====
The earliest possible origins of the Alliance to Restore the Republic are told during the events of Revenge of the Sith. In deleted scene 2 called "A Stirring in the Senate", a group of six Senators including Padmé Amidala, Mon Mothma and Bail Organa meet in the latter's office to discuss ways to counter the already unjustified extraordinary powers of Supreme Chancellor Palpatine "subverting the Constitution" as the Clone Wars were waning, with Mothma stating their goal was "preserving democracy within the Republic". Amidala was initially skeptical of Palpatine's evil intentions because he had supported her during the Trade Federation's occupation of Naboo (The Phantom Menace, 32 BBY), but Organa and Mon Mothma announced the formation of an anti-Palpatine 'organization'; the six Senators agreed to a pact of silence. In deleted scene 3 titled "Seeds of Rebellion" (in Amidala's apartment with two new Senators joining the group), it is explained that the Delegation of 2000 disgruntled Senators will present a petition to the Chancellor. Amidala was more willing to oppose Palpatine now, but wanted to involve the Jedi, at least Anakin Skywalker. However, aside from one Senator agreeing, the others doubted whether the Jedi Council would be loyal to the Republic or the Chancellor, and opted to wait. (Note: These deleted scenes were included in the 2005 DVD home edition, with director George Lucas stating: 'There is an entire sub-plot with Padmé joining the Rebel Alliance with Mon Mothma and Bail Organa. This was really her story that was going along at the same time that Anakin was being seduced by Palpatine in the beginning before he turns. And ultimately, we decided that it was very important that we focus on Anakin's story. So it was with deep regrets that I had to— to let that whole sub-plot go.') Amidala died in premature childbirth not long after her last-ditch attempt to prevent Anakin's fall. In The Imperial Handbook, Grand Moff Tarkin related that most members of the Delegation of 2000 were arrested; Mothma and Organa retained their Senatorship by remaining outwardly obedient to Palpatine, while secretly leading the unification of disparate bands of insurgents into what they termed the Rebel Alliance.

===== First major battles, rebel fleet (5 BBY) =====
The Disney series Rebels depicts the development of the rebellion against the Galactic Empire beginning five years before A New Hope (5 BBY) and fourteen years after the fall of the Galactic Republic and the Jedi Order in Revenge of the Sith (19 BBY). The show focuses on a motley group of rebels (all of whom have been affected by the Empire in one form or another) that banded together aboard a freighter starship called Ghost. They called themselves the Spectres and were led by Hera Syndulla. By the end of the first season, it is revealed that there were various clandestine cell systems that were resisting the Empire, such as Jun Sato's Phoenix Squadron. Senator Bail Organa (along with his wife, queen Breha Organa) of Alderaan and former Jedi Ahsoka Tano both play a pivotal role in coordinating these splinter cells into a legitimate threat capable of challenging Imperial rule. Funded primarily by the Royal House of Alderaan, the alliance began to allocate resources towards a united front against Imperial rule. The Spectres and Phoenix Squadron were later integrated into the Massassi Group based on Yavin 4, which by Rogue One (1 BBY) and A New Hope (0 BBY) was commanded by General Jan Dodonna. One last important rebel cell that later became part of the Rebel Alliance was the Mon Calamari Exodus Fleet, commanded by Admiral Raddus and Admiral Ackbar, formed out of civilian spacecraft during the Imperial occupation of Mon Cala in 18 BBY (1 year into the Empire, 18 years prior to the Battle of Yavin). Other Star Wars media depicts groups such as the crew of the Stinger Mantis led by Jedi Knight Cal Kestis and Jedi Master Cere Junda, the Axis network, a spy network led by Luthen Rael who sought to unite the fragmented conflicting factions into a formal coalition against the Empire, and the Ghorman Front, the local resistance of the planet Ghorman that was indifferent to galactic affairs but whose involvement was pivotal to the formal organization of the Rebel Alliance.

===== Ghorman Massacre Condemnation and the Declaration of Rebellion (2 BBY) =====
In the second season of Andor, Senior Senator Mon Mothma denounces the Ghorman Massacre in a powerful speech where she names Emperor Palpatine as responsible for the attack. She denounces the event as "unprovoked genocide" and describes Palpatine as "the monster who will come for [them] all soon enough", highlighting the Empire's systemic oppressive rule and remarking the death of truth as "the ultimate victory of evil". This event marked the end of her double life, leading her to fully defect from the Empire. She was able to escape with the aid of Axis network agent Cassian Andor, who smuggled Mothma off Coruscant and escorted her to Yavin 4, where she was handed off to Gold Squadron and the Spectres. Her flight for her life continues in the third season of Rebels in the episode "Secret Cargo", where she escapes further assassination attempts by the Empire. Enroute to Dantooine, she called out to the various rebel cells and insurgency factions to unite into a unified coalition:

Declaration of Rebellion

We, the beings of the Rebel Alliance, do this day send forth this Declaration to His Majesty, the Emperor, and to all sentient beings in the Galaxy, to make clear to all the Purposes and Goals of this Rebellion. We believe that the Galactic Empire has willfully and malignantly usurped the rights of the free beings of the Galaxy and therefore, it is our unalienable right to abolish it from the Galaxy. We, the Rebel Alliance, do therefore in the name—and by the authority—of the free beings of the Galaxy, solemnly publish and declare our intentions:

To fight and oppose you and your forces, by any and all means at our disposal;
To refuse any Imperial law contrary to the rights of free beings;
To bring about your destruction and the destruction of the Galactic Empire;
To make forever free all beings in the galaxy.

To these ends, we pledge our property, our honor, and our lives.

Many rebel ships arrive at a rendezvous point above Dantooine to unite and form the "Alliance to Restore the Republic".

=== Government ===
==== Senior civil government, military high command and other notable figures ====
- Gial Ackbar – Admiral and Commander of the Alliance fleet at the Battle of Endor.
- Cassian Andor – Pilot, Intelligence Officer, and former Axis network agent.
  - Killed in action during Rogue One: A Star Wars Story, in the Battle of Scarif.
- Crix Madine – General of the Alliance Special Forces.
- Ahsoka Tano – Former Jedi Padawan; covert operations spymaster and first 'Fulcrum' agent.
- Breha Organa – Adoptive mother of Leia Organa; ruling monarch of Alderaan; manager of the Rebel Alliance's funds, as revealed in the 2017 novel, Leia: Princess of Alderaan. Played a pivotal role in securing Alderaan's support for the Rebel Alliance as its primary galactic advocate.
  - Killed during Episode IV: A New Hope, when the Death Star destroys Alderaan.
- Wedge Antilles – Commander of Rogue Squadron; Marshal of the Alliance Starfighter Corps; the only combatant to have survived two separate attack runs on the Death Stars.
- Raymus Antilles – Captain of the famous Alderaanian cruiser Tantive IV. Escort to members of the Royal House of Alderaan.
  - Killed in action during Episode IV: A New Hope by Darth Vader.
- Lando Calrissian – General and former Cloud City administrator.
- Carlist Rieekan – General and Commander of the Alliance's Echo Base on Hoth.
- Jan Dodonna – General and Commander of the Alliance's Base One on Yavin 4.
  - Killed in action at the Mako-Ta Space Docks by sacrificing himself to prevent the Executor from destroying the remaining elements of the Alliance.
- Hera Syndulla – General and pilot of the Ghost.
- Ezra Bridger – Jedi Padawan.
  - Declared missing in action during the Liberation of Lothal when he commanded a pod of purrgil to exile himself and Grand Admiral Thrawn to the extragalactic planet Peridea aboard his Star Destroyer Chimaera. Returned to the galaxy along with Thrawn as a stowaway on the Chimaera during the New Republic era in 9 ABY.
- Rex – Former clone trooper Captain, Advanced Recon Commando, and Commander of the 501st Legion in the Galactic Republic, Captain and Commander in the Rebel Alliance. Participated in the Battle of Endor as part of Han Solo's strike team.
- Luthen Rael – Axis network spymaster and proprietor of the Galactic Antiquities and Objects of Interest antiques shop on Coruscant which he used as a front for his operations, and the mastermind behind the formal organization of the Rebel Alliance. While he was instrumental in uniting the scattered rebel cells into a single coalition against the Empire, he left a mixed legacy as a ruthless and manipulative extremist.
  - Attempted suicide during a confrontation at his shop with Imperial Security Bureau supervisor Dedra Meero, who kept him on life support for interrogation. Later euthanized by his associate Kleya Marki during her infiltration of Lina Soh Hospital.
- Luke Skywalker – Commander and Jedi Knight; former Commander of Rogue Squadron and Jedi Master of the reformed Jedi Order on Ossus.
- Leia Organa – Representative of the planet Alderaan in the Imperial Senate and Senior diplomat of the Alliance; General of the Resistance.
- Han Solo – General and former smuggler pilot of the Millennium Falcon.

=== Military ===
The Alliance Military and its activities were overseen by Alliance High Command, who managed the logistical and strategic matters of the Rebellion's efforts against the dominant Galactic Empire. Alliance Intelligence was headed by Spymaster Bail Organa and Spymaster Ahsoka Tano, which proved essential for maintaining communications, finding missions for the various Alliance Cells, and coordinating the Alliance's highly decentralized structure. At the time of the Battle of Endor, its chief commanders were: Gial Ackbar serving as Admiral of the Alliance Starfleet; Crix Madine serving as General of Alliance Pathfinders.

==== Alliance Army ====
The Alliance military could never decisively win a "land war" with the Empire. Generally speaking, the quality of Alliance infantry varied greatly by unit. Due to the highly decentralized structure of the Alliance, these units often operated independently with little oversight, and were frequently lacking in discipline, equipment, intelligence and combat skills. They often consisted of convicts, street thugs, pirates, outlaws, and anyone whose profession placed them at odds with the Empire. These infantry were tolerated by Alliance Command, both for their willingness to mount an insurgency against the Empire, and for them being expendable.

==== Alliance Pathfinders ====
Mission critical operations were carried out by few standardized special forces units, dubbed "pathfinders", who had previous military training for infiltration, were experienced in asymmetrical warfare, and were capable of operating indefinitely without resupply. Pathfinders volunteered in the Battle of Scarif under Cassian Andor, and spearheaded the ground assault during the Battle of Endor.

==== Alliance Starfleet ====
The Alliance military largely consisted of mothballed, improvised, repurposed, or stolen civilian ships from dozens of manufacturers; they lacked the means, resources or shipyards to build, maintain and crew thousands of military-grade capital ships. The Alliance constantly had to change bases and their carrier ships routinely had to escape into hyperspace before recovering their fighter complement. The biggest and most powerful warship they had available were several MC80 star cruisers supplied to the Alliance by Mon Calamari, but the Alliance Fleet kept these in reserve and never risked deploying them, even when strategically critical bases in Atollon, Yavin, and Hoth came under siege. The Alliance fleet is geared towards fabian strategy, space superiority, wolfpack operations, hit-and-run tactics, secret missions, subterfuge, and general elements of a stateless military grand strategy. They used gunships and corvettes to screen Imperial starfighters. Their warships carried a complement of expensive starfighters equipped with FTL hyperdrives and deflector shields that traveled alongside the fleet. This was in contrast to Imperial naval doctrine, whose TIE-series starfighters were lightly armored and lacked hyperdrives to lower unit cost and discourage pilot defection. The Alliance's focus on small light combat ships and on starfighters allowed them to effectively fight the Galactic Empire's well-funded and well-armed military.

The Alliance Starfleet almost never become decisively engaged or placed their ships at risk; they avoided pitched battles, frontal assaults, wars of attrition and conventional, symmetric engagements with the Imperials at all costs. Instead of engaging the Imperials in open firefights, the Rebel Alliance largely embraced flexible non-committal attack tactics utilizing mainly fast attack CR90 corvettes supplied to the Alliance by Alderaan. The Imperial leadership considered collateral damage as "acceptable margins" in rooting out insurgents; this contrasted against the Alliance's surgical precision to avoid civilian casualties. To minimize losses, the Alliance military leadership heavily favored carrier battle groups supporting starfighter strike crafts for fast-attack style of warfare, thereby leveraging a decisive advantage over the Galactic Empire's "big powerful ships" doctrine. Anti-Imperial operations emphasized depredation and delayed actions, covertly relocating compromised bases to another secured system, interdiction in slowing down the Imperials' momentum, and inflicting maximum damage on the enemy without, in principle, becoming decisively engaged.

==== Alliance Starfighter Corps ====
The Alliance finds its strength almost entirely in the starfighter arena, offering some of the most effective and versatile small strike craft within Star Wars canon. The Alliance was plagued by lack of resources: it was low on fighters, manpower, real estate. Jan Dodonna believed unsupported hyperspace-capable starfighters could undermine the Empire's control of space and demonstrated this to the galaxy by winning high-profile victories: Star Destroyers, shipyards, local fleets and the Death Star. Despite the Corps' high-maintenance costs and being chronically understaffed, with starfighter logistics, aerospace engineers and veteran pilots being limited in numbers, the Alliance doctrine—raiding targets before they could mount a defense, then leaving—proved flawless in singling out vulnerable targets and attacking only when they had strength, and only when the results were spectacular. Seventy percent of sorties were reconnaissance missions: finding targets for starfighter raids became the top priority of Alliance intelligence. The introduction of the A-wing, B-wing and X-wing, along with the former Imperial officers who piloted them, only improved upon that advantage.

- Gold Squadron, commanded by Jon Vander, was an BTL-A4 Y-wing light bomber squadron that served as part of the Rebel Alliance's elite starfighter corps during the Galactic Civil War. This unit was instrumental in escorting Senator Mon Mothma safely to Dantooine, participated in the Battle of Scarif, and was nearly wiped out by Darth Vader in the Battle of Yavin. Under the command of Lando Calrissian, it succeeded in destroying the second Death Star's reactor during the Battle of Endor.
- Green Squadron, commanded by Arvel Crynyd, was a RZ-1 A-wing interceptor squadron that served as part of the Rebel Alliance's starfighter corps during the Galactic Civil War. The squadron most notably participated in the Alliance's most decisive campaigns, including: the Battle of Atollon; the Battle of Scarif; and the Battle of Endor. It was Arvel Cyrnyd who crashed his A-wing into the bridge of the Executor, thereby disabling the ship.
- Red Squadron, commanded by Garven Dreis, was a T-65B X-wing starfighter squadron that served as part of the Rebel Alliance's starfighter corps during the Galactic Civil War. The squadron most notably participated in the Alliance's most decisive campaigns, including: the Battle of Scarif; the Battle of Vrogas Vas; the Battle of Hoth; and the Battle of Endor.
- Blue Squadron, commanded by Antoc Merrick, was an airspeeder and starfighter squadron that served as part of the Rebel Alliance's elite starfighter corps during the Galactic Civil War. The squadron most notably participated in the Alliance's most decisive campaigns, including: the Battle of Scarif; the Siege on Tureen VII; the Battle of Hoth; and the Battle of Endor.
- Rogue Squadron, commanded by Wedge Antilles, was a starfighter squadron in the Star Wars franchise. The squadron appears in The Empire Strikes Back (1980) as "Rogue Group". In the 2016 film Rogue One, rebel fighters on a suicide mission to steal the plans for the Death Star (which causes the Battle of Scarif) self-identify as "Rogue One", which later serves as the inspiration for the group's name. To honor Rogue One, they did not use it as a callsign, with Rogue Leader preceding Rogue Two.

=== Galactic Civil War ===
After the fall of the Old Republic and the birth of the Empire, as depicted in Revenge of the Sith, numerous insurgent cells were formed to oppose the New Order, but did not have an organized command structure nor did their goals align, resulting in fighting between cells in addition to the Empire. The Galactic Civil War began in 4 BBY as the Rebellion became more organized, followed by the Ghorman Massacre in 2 BBY and the formal declaration of the Alliance to Restore the Republic with the scattered groups united into one coalition.

==== Belligerents ====
Galactic Empire

Alliance to Restore the Republic

Bail Organa was the architect of the entire Alliance to Restore the Republic movement. Even while others were still hesitant to oppose the Empire, Organa utilized his status as galactic royalty to help rescue key figures like Grandmaster Yoda, establish the Fulcrum spy network, and stockpile weapons and supplies across the galaxy for future use. Without the leadership, experience, and moral guidance provided by individuals like Organa and Mon Mothma, the rebellion likely would have never coalesced or could have been overtaken by less ideologically pure factions motivated solely by revenge.

Despite the great deal of ideological compromise and strong inspirational leadership, the Alliance was a political faction coalition that was never a single cohesive unit during its entire existence; it was a fractured mess of different Rebel cells, many with their own motives, plans, and ideologies. The Alliance Command was a centralized, de facto elected dictatorship (albeit a temporary one that reformed into a more democratic system the moment the Emperor was dead); this was just a consequence of the realities of running a revolution, but nonetheless, other Rebel leaders took issue with. Mon Mothma, despite being commander in chief, actually had no real power to command all of the various factions that supported her cause. The Alliance was a chaotic, diverse, and decentralized movement where factions often disagreed on everything. As depicted in Rogue One, every faction voted on major military and political decisions, but had maximum autonomy, with their own independent chain of commands, and were otherwise free to conduct their own anti-Imperial operations as they deem fit. Leaders of these individual factions would choose what missions they wanted to participate and refused those when they believed was detrimental to their unit. The goal was to stay alive and not get destroyed by the Empire.

- The Mothmatists - "Mothmatist" is a term used by Imperials to label anyone who preferred democracy to military dictatorship; specifically Mothma and her followers who sought to restore the Republic as it had been before Emperor Palpatine had twisted it beyond recognition. They were believers in democracy, equality, and pluralism, and wanted to see them restored as the guiding principles of a galaxy-spanning New Republic. The Mothmatists were concerned with restoring civil rights, ending the Imperial persecution of nonhumans, and abolishing slavery. The Mothmatists wanted a New Republic that was based on the Old Republic, but with some structural differences, such as reducing the power of the executive and the courts and decentralizing government affairs to give sectors and systems more autonomy.
- Bail Organa's Alderaanian Resistance - Born out of the Delegation of 2000, Bail Organa used his Senate diplomatic privileges, his own household guard in the Alderaanian Diplomatic Corps, and refugee aid programs to cover for a complex operation that were foundational of a wider rebel movement. Bail Organa established a network of informants, with spymasters known as "Fulcrum", who played key role in informing the Rebellion of the Empire's actions and goals. Bail Organa clandestinely deposited bunkers, ships, weapons, and resource caches on various "rebel safe worlds" all across the galaxy; many of these assets were later repurposed by General Leia Organa's Resistance.
- Massassi Group - Essentially the Rebellion's first regular battle-hardened professional soldiers, Massassi are ex-Imperial defectors. They are the largest, most disciplined, best trained and well-armed rebel faction; smaller than a Fleet, but large enough to carry out tactical operations against the empire. An ad hoc headquarters, Massassi operations focused on protecting Rebellion VIPs; General Jan Dodonna formed the core leadership of this group. A Clone Wars veteran Republic officer, Jan Dodonna was amongst the first captains commissioned a newly designed Imperial-class Star Destroyer ship of the line; right before he defected to the Rebellion. An individual with intimate doctrinal knowledge of the Imperial fleets down to the schematics of their individual ships, how they operate and all of their weaknesses. Jan Dodonna developed tactical doctrines, the mix of starfighters, corvettes, and blockade runners that formed the core of their fleet, and a military fighting force that perfectly countered the Imperial Navy's slower and heavily armed feet. After engaging the Battles of Scarif and Yavin 4, the Massassi group was disbanded to avoid capture by Darth Vader's ruthlessly efficient anti-rebel purging operations.
- Phoenix Fleet - The Rebellion had clandestine cell systems spread all across the galaxy, each assigned to a specific sector, tasked with harassing Imperial supply lines and raiding Imperial outposts. As depicted in Star Wars Rebels, Phoenix cell were amongst the most effective rebel cells; it was active as early as 4 BBY; assigned to the strategically important Lothal system. Lothal was home to many essential minerals and natural resource extraction sites necessary for the Imperial military industrial complex, and hosted Sienar Fleet Systems' experimental "TIE Defender" operation. Phoenix Cell tied up a disproportionate amount of Imperial resources on Lothal and proved so disruptive for the local Garrison, the Empire sent their top leaders in a desperate attempt to quash Phoenix cell: Grand Moff Tarkin, Colonel Wullf Yularen, Grand Admiral Thrawn and Darth Vader. They were involved in the Battle of Atollon and the Escape of Mon Mothma. In 1 BBY, Phoenix Cell successfully dismantled TIE Defender mass production, liberated Lothal from Imperial control and banished Thrawn's Fleet, along with the Chiss himself to the extragalactic planet of Peridea; making it amongst the first decisive victories for the Rebellion at the sector level.
- Mon Cala Planetary Defense Force (PDF) - Following the Galactic Empire's occupation of Mon Calamari in 18 BBY, under the command of Admiral Raddus, the PDF fought in a successful underwater campaign and converted many of the large underwater cities' civic buildings into warships. A large number of Mon Calamari escaped, forming the "Mon Calamari Exodus Fleet". These "buildings", the MC75 Star Cruisers were the largest ship of the line the alliance had access to. The Mon Calamari people had a historic reputation as shipbuilders, sailors, and navigators. Admiral Raddus would perish at the Battle of Scarif when his ship was boarded by Darth Vader. Post-Battle of Yavin the Mon Calamari Mercantile Fleet, commanded by Captain Ackbar, defected to the Rebellion, bringing several MC80 Cruisers which would form the backbone of the Rebel Navy.
- Axis Network - An intelligence unit led by Luthen Rael; a master manipulator who fought from the shadows, using sabotage, subterfuge, and espionage, who willingly sacrifice his allies in pursuit of greater objectives, and he was considered shifty and untrustworthy by the leaders of the Alliance. Axis operatives are the unsung heroes who sacrificed severely. As depicted in Andor, its main purpose was two-fold: to unite all rebellious factions into an Alliance capable of resistance, and provoking the Empire into a brutal crack-down on the civilian populace to further fuel dissidence. The Axis network knew the harsh reality: Palpatine was always ten steps ahead of them, and he had 10,000 times the firepower at his disposal. This resistance was less about destroying the Empire and more about making it bleed bit by bit from the inside, so that someday a true power can come in and turn these cuts into severe wounds. The Axis network knew that unless all factions cooperated, none will ever achieved anything more than small tactical victories.
- Ghorman Front - A resistance group based in Ghorman's capital city Palmo led by Imperial Loyalist, politician and businessman Carro Rylanz. Unlike other resistance groups, the Ghorman Front was not concerned with wider galactic issues and instead focused on activities on their home planet. Rylanz believed in the idealized image of Palpatine being the hero that ended the Clone Wars who had the best interests of the Empire in mind, and that abuses like those happening on Ghorman were the work of other high-ranking Imperials abusing their power, with their end goal to expose the corruption of officials to Palpatine. The Ghorman Front was active as of 5 BBY, with the Partisans being aware of their existence and regarded them as a lost cause. Its members were active in protesting the construction of a supposed office complex in the center of Palmo, in reality an Imperial armory, as they felt it was an insult to a monument constructed after then-Moff Tarkin indiscriminately landed his cruiser and crushed 500 unarmed protesters in 19 BBY. Over the course of a year beginning in 3 BBY, the Empire allowed them to grow bolder and take up armed resistance, eventually culminating in a protest against their occupation of the planet in 2 BBY, unknown to them that it was part of a larger plan to gouge-mine the planet of the mineral kalkite to coat the Death Star's reactor lenses with. This ended in a violent suppression of protesters referred to as the Ghorman Massacre. Despite the Ghorman Front's disconnection from the wider Rebellion, the event fully radicalized Mon Mothma against the Empire and caused her to publicly denounce Emperor Palpatine for genocide, spurring the formal organization of the Rebel Alliance.
- Partisans - An extremist group led by Saw Gerrera, the Partisans were less concerned about restoring the principles of the Republic than it was about striking back against the unfathomable evil of the Empire, doing whatever they could to undermine it as much as they could. Saw's ideology was anarchic aggressive anti-imperialism, one that viewed anyone that directly or indirectly helped the Imperial war machine as a collaborator and a legitimate target. Partisans launch more successful raids than any other faction against Imperial facilities; ruthless in their execution, obsessed with inflicting maximum damage against the Empire, with zero reservations to civilian mass casualties. The Partisans are Clone Wars veterans, who for twenty years, had been engaged against the Empire since day one of the Republic's collapse. The Partisans are masters in asymmetrical warfare, being trained by the Republic Special Forces on Saw's home world of Onderon to resist the Separatists occupation of his planet. The Partisans never formally joined the Alliance; the cynical Saw Gerrera hated Mon Mothma's idealism and considered all other factions as traitors for working with former enemies and cowards unwilling to fight dirty. In response, the Alliance distanced themselves from the politically damaging Partisans, and ordered for Saw Gerrera to be assassinated for his war crimes. The Partisans would fracture on Jedha after briefly liberating the moon, when the Empire tested its Death Star superweapon, killing many, including Saw. Despite this, the surviving members would continue operating into the later years of the Galactic Civil War under Saw's right-hand man Benthic who re-established a working relationship with the Rebellion, while a Partisan cell that was not present on Jedha reorganized into the Dreamers and was subsequently infiltrated and eliminated by Inferno Squad.
- Hidden Path - A secret underground railroad founded by Jedi Master, Order 66 survivor, and former Sith acolyte Quinlan Vos, the Hidden Path is dedicated to sheltering surviving Jedi and other Force-sensitives from the Galactic Empire by giving them new identities and opportunities to start anew away from their prying eyes. The Path's membership included Jedi and non-Jedi alike, among them the crew of the Stinger Mantis led by Jedi Knight Cal Kestis and Jedi Master Cere Junda, as well as Imperial officer and defector Tala Durith and con artist Haja Estree, who both aided Obi-Wan Kenobi in his mission to rescue Princess Leia Organa.
- Zero Company - A misfit mercenary group led by former Republic captain Hawks who led the 100th Clone Division and served under Jedi General and later Sith associate Pong Krell, but was later court-martialed and discharged by Admiral Tarkin after a disastrous mission on Antine that resulted in Hawks taking the blame. Zero Company takes its name from the 100th Clone Division's nickname, and was composed of operators from opposing sides of the Clone Wars, with a notable contract under the Galactic Republic to hunt the Separatist-aligned cult Infinite Coil and their leader Kundri Fathom during the final year of the conflict. Among their roster included clone trooper Trick who previously served under Hawks and deemed unfit for service, boxer Kabb Uppercut, Shu-Torun ore-baroness Jae Mordant, Umbaran soldier Luco Bronc, Jedi Padawan Tel-Rea Vokoss, and Mandalorian bounty hunter Cly Kullervo, with the group advised by former Separatist Runa Blask and Republic intelligence agent Bennic Halloren. Their mission was interrupted upon the reformation of the Republic into the Galactic Empire, with Halloren reassigned into the newly-formed Imperial Security Bureau and Trick's inhibitor chip activating, the latter whom Zero Company was forced to subdue and was sent into a coma during the firefight. Despite the dissolution of their contract, they continued their hunt for Fathom during the early Imperial era while also removing Trick's chip with Rex's aid. Hawks and Halloren established a temporary alliance to eliminate Fathom, after which Halloren defected to Zero Company.
- Clone Underground - Consisting of clone troopers that overcame their behavioral modification biochips and became disillusioned with the Empire, the Clone Underground is a Teth-based resistance group founded by former Clone Captain Rex and fought in the name of the former Galactic Republic. Their goal was to free and shelter any like-minded clone troopers that wished to defect from their ranks, and conducted attacks on Imperials to free imprisoned clones and as well as other anti-Imperial operations. The Clone Underground was largely annihilated after their base was discovered by an Imperial clone X trooper and subsequently assaulted. A small number of members escaped with the aid of the Bad Batch, including Rex who pleaded with his former friend and comrade Wolffe to spare them, to which he agreed.
- Neo Separatist Coalition holdouts - Remnants of the Confederacy of Independent Systems, the Separatist holdouts are fractured military and political elements who in their minds, are still fighting the Clone Wars; the Republic now calls itself the Empire, but its still the same enemy. The Separatists generally favored decentralization, independence, and other libertarian principles much more strongly than the Alliance, and they often clashed with other Rebel groups over the goal of restoring the Republic. These neo-Separatists were often disliked by other Rebel groups, especially those led by former Imperial Loyalists. They remain mobile and strike at the Empire in any way possible. Unlike the larger rebel movement, the Separatist holdouts are eager to end this war and free their home worlds from Imperial occupation, and so are quite ruthless and impulsive in their actions. One Separatist holdout group on the planet Agamar was led by General Kalani, whose forces avoided the shutdown order issued at the end of the Clone Wars, but refused to join the organized rebellion due to believing that the chances of overthrowing the Empire were minimal at best, though he finally acknowledged that the war was over. Another group led by Anto Kreegyr was in contact with the Axis network as part of Luthen Rael's collaboration with scattered rebel groups throughout the galaxy, but due to Saw Gerrera's initial refusal to work with the group to raid an Imperial power station on Spellhaus and the Imperial Security Bureau's knowledge of the planned attack, it was wiped out by a trap due to Luthen choosing not to warn Kreegyr's cell and protecting ISB supervisor and spy Lonni Jung.
- Free Ryloth movement - The people of Ryloth suffered greatly during the Clone Wars, when separatist forces occupied and pillaged the planet for resources. The resistance leader Cham Syndulla, with the help of Republic Clone forces, beat back the Confederacy; however, in the post-war period, it became very obvious that the newly formed Empire were not liberators, but occupiers with no intention to leave. Cham Syndulla led a new insurgency, the Free Ryloth movement, which focused defensive tactics and on domestic issues. His daughter, Hera Syndulla, would leave to join Phoenix Fleet, knowing that cooperation was the best way to free her home world.
- Cloud Riders - Pirates and marauders that would raid settlements, harass Imperial logistical networks and other soft Targets in the Imperial military; their goal was to ultimately raise funds so that they could fight the Empire. This organization was started because the individuals making up this organization were all fleeing oppression from the Empire and the many criminal syndicates that supported the Empire.
- Crimson Dawn - As depicted in Solo: A Star Wars Story, the Crimson Dawn is a criminal organization once led by the former Sith Lord Maul. After Maul was killed on Tatooine by his arch-nemesis Obi-Wan Kenobi in 2 BBY, the Crimson Dawn faded away from the public eye until 3 ABY, where it resurfaced under Qi'ra's leadership. She had an ambitious plan to use the criminal underworld to wage war against the Sith, though her plans of eliminating them ended in failure when she was betrayed by the Knights of Ren, causing the organization's collapse. Despite the end of the Crimson Dawn, Qi'ra's goal was ultimately realized when she contributed to their defeat by revealing the existence of the second Death Star to the Alliance, allowing them to regroup and eventually destroy the battle station at the Battle of Endor, which also resulted in the deaths of Palpatine and Vader.
- Amidalans - A Naboo-based resistance group founded by former handmaiden Sabé in the wake of Padmé Amidala's death, the Amidalans pledged to hunt down and kill whoever was responsible. Three years after the Battle of Yavin, they came to the conclusion that her murderer was Darth Vader, though only Sabé herself was able to deduce that he was also Amidala's former husband Anakin Skywalker.
- Kashyyyk Resistance - The Wookies on the planet, given their close ties to the Jedi Order, helped hide and protect key members of the Jedi Council. The Empire crack down on the Wookies with a fury not seen on other worlds, and much of the Wookie population would be enslaved and fitted with explosive collars. The Wookie resistance, a diverse collection of individual tribes and families would melt away into the deep forest of the planet and remain a thorn in the side of the Imperial occupation for the entire conflict. The Wookies were fiercely independent and refused to be dominated. The Empire carried out massive deforestation operations in order to extract the rich resources of the world.
- Mandalorian Resistance - With the Separatist threat destroyed with the Jedi completely decimated, the last remaining warrior culture that presented any threat to the Empire was the Mandalorians. The Mandalorians in the last moments of the Clone Wars had joined forces with the Clone Army to retake their home world from Maul and his Death Watch faction. Bo-Katan, the legitimate leader of the True Mandalorians, held on to the title of regent for just one day before the Republic collapsed and was reorganized into the Galactic Empire. The clone troopers who had helped the Mandalorians became an occupying force and Bo-Katan was expected to bend knee to Palpatine; she refused. The Empire carried out the great genocidal purge of Mandalore. The Empire spared no expense in keeping the Mandalorian survivors fragmented because they were such a massive threat.

==== 5 BBY ====
As portrayed in the live-action series Andor, one single moment in Galactic history completely changed the Empire's policy towards its citizens and therefore changed its relationship with its citizens. In 5 BBY, on the relatively unremarkable planet of Aldhani, a small rebel team managed to infiltrate the local Imperial depository, stealing a decent portion of the sector payroll. This created a massive Imperial overreaction, increasing their security spending and draconian law enforcement policies, making all future rebellious activity even more costly and difficult, which is exactly what the mastermind of this heist Luthen Rael wanted. Luthen Rael's objective is uniting dozens of different insurgent and rebel factions who are all individually fighting the Empire; he believes provoking the Empire's brutality will force these factions into a Coalition and turn them into a real fighting force. As the Empire tightened their grip, more star systems slipped from their grasps.

During the funeral procession in Rix Road, a holographic message Maarva Andor had pre-recorded inspired the people of Ferrix to rise up against the Empire and form a resistance movement. A planet-wide riot spontaneously erupted as residents charged the Imperial checkpoints and garrisons; this riot became a massacre as Imperials troops were ordered to fire indiscriminately into the crowd.

The Rebels episode, "Zero Hour", demonstrates the Imperials' absolute naval supremacy when they successfully entrapped the "Phoenix Fleet" during the Battle of Atollon, and forced them in engaging on equal footing; resulting a decisive victory for the Imperials and the total decimation of the rebel fleet. Phoenix Cell would successfully liberated Lothal from Imperial control in 1 BBY and banished Thrawn's Fleet to another galaxy; making it amongst the first decisive victories for the Rebellion at the sector level.

==== 0 BBY ====
During the events of Rogue One and A New Hope, the Alliance learns of the construction of the 'Death Star', an enormous superweapon capable of obliterating entire planets, intended to cement the Empire's rule of terror. Intelligence gathered reveals that a Death Star engineer antipathetic to the causes of the Empire had intentionally included a design flaw that, if exploited, could bring down the entire station. With the help of the Rogue One squad led by Jyn Erso and Cassian Andor, a rebel assault on an Imperial facility on the heavily defended planet Scarif successfully manages to capture schematics of the Death Star. The Battle of Scarif was the first major conventional engagement against the Empire, and ended in a pyrrhic victory; all members of Rogue One are killed in action, and the rebel fleet was decimated.

After successfully capturing the Death Star plans, Alderaanian soldiers aboard a Mon Calamari flagship barely manage to escape the 501st Legion and Death Squadron with the stolen data plans. Immediately following the Battle of Scarif, the Tantive IV, an Alderaanian corvette carrying Princess Leia Organa is captured by Lord Vader's flagship, Imperial I-class Star Destroyer Devastator, while attempting to deliver the plans to Bail Organa on Alderaan. All members of the Alderaanian Consular Security onboard are either killed or taken prisoner and Princess Leia Organa is held hostage for a time by Darth Vader. In order to punish both her and her home planet's central involvement in the Rebel Alliance, Leia is forced to witness Alderaan's destruction by the Death Star. The Princess is subsequently rescued by Luke Skywalker, Han Solo, Chewbacca, and Obi-Wan Kenobi, who then deliver the station schematics to the Alliance. Subsequent analysis of the schematics reveals the critical vulnerability to be an exhaust port leading directly to the station's reactor core.

The Empire discovers the location of the primary Alliance headquarters on a moon of the planet Yavin through a tracking device covertly planted on Han Solo's vessel, and deploys the Death Star to destroy the base and crush the insurgency once and for all. During the ensuing battle of Yavin, rebel starfighter squadrons lead an assault on the Death Star in a last-ditch attempt to exploit the vulnerability before it could fire upon the rebel base. Despite fighters sustaining heavy losses, one pilot—the Force-sensitive Luke Skywalker—successfully guides torpedoes down the exhaust port. The Death Star is obliterated in a catastrophic explosion, and the battle ends in a decisive rebel victory.

==== 1 ABY ====
The Alliance, spurred on by their victory at Yavin 4 and a flood of new recruits, took the fight to the Empire and assaulted the Mid Rim on various fronts, known as Mid Rim Offensive. The initial ferocity of the offensive forced the Empire to withdraw from several worlds. The Imperial military wasn't designed to fight a determined conventional enemy: it was designed for oppression of the civilian populace. But eventually, this offensive's momentum ran out due to a lack of coordination at the sector level. The Alliance fleet wasn't capable of protecting the advance of rebel ground forces, especially their increasingly extended and vulnerable supply lines. By the third year of the offensive, the rebel logistical system was on the verge of collapse. The operation failed and was renamed the Mid Rim Retreat.

In the Star Wars comics, the Rebellion wins numerous victories against the Empire after the destruction of the Death Star, destroying its major weapons factory on Cymoon 1, breaking an Imperial blockade around the rebel world of Tureen VII by stealing the Imperial I-class Star Destroyer Harbinger and recruiting the Mon Calamari trading fleet to be refitted as an assault fleet. Such firepower would finally allow the Alliance to attack the Empire on a larger scale. However, one of the Rebellion's allies, Queen Trios of Shu-Torun (whose world's technology had been fitted into the ships of the new rebel fleet), revealed herself as an undercover Imperial agent sent by Darth Vader to sabotage their efforts. With their ships unexpectedly paralyzed by the Shu-Torun technology, the gathered rebel fleet could do little as they were targeted for destruction by Vader's Imperial fleet. Half the rebel ships were destroyed in the battle before Leia found a way around the sabotage and allowed the remaining ships to escape. However, Generals Jan Dodonna and Davits Draven, as well as several other high-ranking rebel officers, were killed during the battle and the remaining rebel ships were separated in their flight. Mon Mothma instructed all rebel cells to regroup in time while striking out at the Empire when and how they could. Not until the Battle of Endor would the whole force of the Rebellion be once again united in a single place.

==== 3 ABY ====
In The Empire Strikes Back, the Alliance suffers a crushing defeat on Hoth when one of their main command centers, Echo Base, is overrun by the Darth Vader's elite personal Imperial armed forces, the Death Squadron and the 501st Legion. The remaining forces of the Rebellion are forced to stay mobile, using Admiral Ackbar's flagship, Home One, as their headquarters. Vader would continue to systematically and ruthlessly dismantle Alliance assets, and to hunt for Luke in the process, forcing Alliance survivors to abandon all static bases and regroup with Alliance HQ.

==== 4 ABY ====
By Return of the Jedi, after four years of major defeats and wipeouts of entire rebel units by Lord Vader's elite forces, the Alliance has regrouped and learned that a second, more powerful Death Star is being constructed and will be completed under Emperor Palpatine's personal supervision. Although the Imperial Navy possessed overwhelming numerical and strategic superiority, the fleet assembled by the Rebel Alliance above Endor was also their largest and most powerful they had ever assembled. The Alliance took Emperor Palpatine's bait of falsified information to explicitly lure them into a trap of his own design. Nearly every faction's member and major Alliance sector command contributed ships to the operation, bringing together rebels that spent years fighting independently across the galaxy. Although the Rebel Alliance had been a cohesive organization for some time now, there would likely never be another opportunity to challenge the Empire on such a scale. The operation was a three front attack: Mon Mothma assigns Admiral Ackbar supreme command of the Alliance fleet; Lando Calrissian and Wedge Antilles command of the Alliance starfighters interception and tactical insertion into the Death Star's vulnerable core; and dispatches General Crix Madine, Han Solo and Princess Leia in leading the Alliance's elite pathfinder ground infiltration strike team to disable the station's defenses; throughout the battle, Luke distracts Darth Vader and Emperor Palpatine. Upon realizing the trap as sprung, Ackbar ordered the fleet to "Assault Through" and engage full-throttle into the enemy's center of gravity; entering into "knife-fight" broadside engagements with Imperial forces in an attempt to shield themselves from the Death Star's one-shot superweapon. The Alliance subsequently wins the Battle of Endor, in which Emperor Palpatine, Darth Vader, the Death Squadron-Imperial armada, and much of the Imperial hierarchy are killed in action. The loss of the second Death Star and other invaluable Imperial naval assets, along with the deaths of Imperial leaders aboard, marked the beginning of the end of Imperial rule over the galaxy.

=== Successor ===
Following their victory at the Battle of Endor, a provisional New Republic was officially formed by Alliance members. This political momentum, combined with the Imperial power vacuum, political infighting, and Operation Cinder—Palpatine's post-mortem scorched earth contingency plan—encouraged thousands of inhabited planets to either declare independence from the collapsing Empire or defect to the Alliance.

The New Republic found itself with no shortage of recruits and resources: the declining popularity of the Empire pushed many long time Imperial loyalists to the rebel cause, including those of Inferno Squadron, who after Operation Cinder, which saw the destruction of countless Imperial worlds, opened the eyes of many to the atrocities of the Empire. Even the most dedicated Imperials such as Inferno Squadron commander Iden Versio were moved to defect after the witnessing the destruction of her homeworld Vardos. Finally realizing the Empire's propaganda had deceived them, many Imperials began to feel shame over their actions, in particular over the destruction of Alderaan.

Despite fact that the New Republic was now winning the war, had a lot more resources than before—and a lot more recruits—the New Republic was suffering from logistic nightmares. The decentralized structure that served them well became a liability; described as "a ragtag force strategically ill-fed and cobbled together of incompatible ships and squadrons". The Alliance fleet shifted military doctrine; the guerrilla warfare aspect of the grand strategy was de-emphasized, and conventional forces took over the primary prosecution of the war. Once the New Republic became powerful enough, the Alliance fleet was reorganized into the New Republic Military, charged with the defense of the New Republic.

About a year after the Battle of Endor, the Rebellion defeated Imperial forces during the Battle of Jakku, formally established the New Republic government, and suspends offensive operations. Thus, the Galactic Civil War came to a close. Three decades later, by the time of The Force Awakens, the New Republic became divided over the First Order, a new military power formed by hardline remnants from the Empire. Publicly, they tolerated the Resistance which was formed to fight the First Order on more direct terms, but continued to disregard the Order as a minor threat until the destruction of the Hosnian system by their Starkiller Base superweapon.

=== Legends ===
After Disney's acquisition of the franchise, Lucasfilm announced in 2014 that previous works outside the theatrical films and The Clone Wars would no longer be considered canon, but began to be republished under the Legends banner.

- According to Star Wars: The Roleplaying Game, the Cantham House Meetings of Coruscant, including the participation of Senators Mon Mothma and Bail Organa, take place with the purpose of discussing the formation of a Galactic Alliance in opposition to Palpatine's Galactic Empire. In addition, the RPG tells that although throughout the galaxy many sectors are already fighting against Imperial interests, resistance is relatively quiet until the incident on the planet Ghorman, which takes place 18 years before the Battle of Yavin. The incident begins when an Imperial military cruiser commanded by Captain Wilhuff Tarkin is blocked by peaceful anti-Empire protesters who refuse to move off the ship's landing pad. With implied permission from the Emperor, Tarkin lands the ship anyway, injuring and killing many, an incident that history would record as the Ghorman Massacre. The myriad of civilizations which are fighting the Empire continue to grow in number and progressively coalesce into a ragtag organization known as the Resistance. They intend upon removing the evil Emperor, but the growing ruthlessness of the Imperial state forces them into secrecy, as they are initially unable to undermine the Empire's regime. The RPG tells that part of the strategy of the Rebel Alliance is the Doctrine of Space Denial, wherein the Rebellion would attack Imperial shipping frigates in hit and run raids, both to disrupt Imperial supplies and operations, and also to loot desperately needed materials. These rebel starfighters were equipped with hyperdrive capability along prearranged routes which would allow this kind of harassment and escape before the Empire may react.
- The video game The Force Unleashed presents a differing view of the Alliance's beginnings, hinting that the Emperor actually secretly pushed for its formation. Palpatine clandestinely bids for the creation of another opposing force, intent on starting yet another war in order to consolidate his power with the fledgling Empire, just as he had done earlier with the Confederacy of Independent Systems. The Emperor orders his apprentice Darth Vader to use his own secret apprentice, Galen Marek (called "Starkiller"), as a pawn to gather together the Empire's enemies, manipulating him into believing that the intention is to start a rebellion. Vader quickly realizes that that is obviously a ploy by Palpatine in order to lure any significant rebels into a trap; however, it is unclear whether Vader (or the Emperor) had intended for the Rebellion to survive. At the supposedly secret meeting known as the Corellian Treaty, Mon Mothma, Bail Organa, Garm Bel Iblis, Jedi-General Rahm Kota, and others meet to formally create the Rebellion against the Empire. However, the proceedings are ambushed by Vader under orders from the Emperor, whom had actually secretly orchestrated the Treaty himself in order to gather all the rebel leaders together and eliminate them. Starkiller, now aligned with the Rebellion after two betrayals by his former master, manages to save the principal founders from the Empire, though at the cost of his own life. Regrouping on Kashyyyk, the Senators formally proclaim an open Declaration of Rebellion, which states the grievances of the Empire against the Alliance to Restore the Republic and concludes with an open threat to depose the Emperor. This marks the formal "founding" of the Rebel Alliance, and Galen Marek's family crest is chosen by Leia as its official symbol. Thus, the Rebel Alliance is effectively founded by Darth Vader himself, and, by extension, Emperor Palpatine, though it is clear neither had imagined that the Alliance would actually ever become a serious threat. The Galactic Civil War consequently ensues, during which the Rebellion confronts the Empire many times throughout the galaxy.
- Empire at War depicts various allies contributing secretly to the Alliance, slowly making the united Rebel Force more powerful. The most notable equipment contributions include the defection of the Incom Corporation staff and all relevant material involved in the development of an advanced spacefighter, the X-wing.
- A "Declaration of Rebellion" was depicted in the 1990 book The Star Wars Rebel Alliance Sourcebook.
- After its victory on Endor, the Rebellion was temporarily stationed there and renamed the "Alliance of Free Planets".

==== Members ====
Canon members:

- General Leia Organa
- Senator Bail Organa
- Admiral Raddus – Captain of the Profundity
- Nien Nunb – Rebel Engineer and pilot
- Han Solo – Captain of the Millennium Falcon
- Hera Syndulla – Pilot, leader of the Phoenix Squadron
- Commander Jun Sato
- Jyn Erso – Member of the Rogue One group

===== Founders =====
- Senator Bana Breemu – Co-founder; early constituting member (deceased)
- Senator Garm Bel Iblis – Co-founder; financed private army to fight against the Empire; rejoined Alliance during the Thrawn campaign.
- Senator Bail Organa of the Imperial Senate (deceased)
- Senator Mon Mothma of the Imperial Senate

===== Senior civil government and military high command =====
- Col Serra – Commander of Renegade Squadron
- Ylenic It'kla – Commander and Jedi Knight who escaped Order 66, serving as a personal aide to Bail Organa on Alderaan. Works with Alderaanian authorities to coordinate rebel activity.
- Qu Rahn – General and Jedi Master who survived Order 66, mostly due to his connection and training with Yoda.
- Rahm Kota – General and former Jedi Master who survived Order 66, thanks to the aid of his own private militia.
- Echuu Shen-Jon – General and Jedi Master who survived Order 66, thanks to his exile on Krant.
- Talon Karrde – General and former smuggler who aided the New Republic during the Thrawn campaign.

== See also ==
- Galactic Republic
- Galactic Empire
- New Republic

== Brief list of appearances ==
- Star Wars: Episode III – Revenge of the Sith (2005; founded in a deleted scene)
- Star Wars: The Bad Batch (2021–2024) (Mentioned only)
- Solo: A Star Wars Story (2018)
- Andor (2022−2025)
- Star Wars Rebels (2014–2018)
- Rogue One: A Star Wars Story (2016)
- Star Wars: Episode IV – A New Hope (1977) (First appearance)
- Star Wars: Episode V – The Empire Strikes Back (1980)
- Star Wars: Episode VI – Return of the Jedi (1983)
- Star Wars Battlefront (2015)
- Star Wars Battlefront II (2017)
- The Mandalorian (2019–2023) (Mentioned only)
- Ahsoka (2023−present) (Mentioned only)
- Star Wars Resistance (2018−2020) (Mentioned only)
- Star Wars: The Force Awakens (2015) (Mentioned only)
- Star Wars: The Last Jedi (2017) (Mentioned only)
