= List of Star Wars starfighters =

The following is a list of starfighters from the science-fiction setting Star Wars. Within the Star Wars setting, a starfighter is defined as a "small, fast, maneuverable, and heavily armed starship used in direct confrontations between opposing forces." In addition to appearing in the saga's movies and TV series, several LucasArts games depict the player as a starfighter pilot.

In the Star Wars universe, starfighters are equipped with the same fictional technology found on other starships. Sublight drives propel starfighters at below lightspeed velocities, with the most common type being the ion engine. These engines are used to lift off from planetary surfaces, travel in deep space and engage other starships in space battles, while inertial dampeners protect the occupants from forceful accelerations. Repulsorlifts are carried as secondary drives for atmospheric flight and when docking or making planetary landings. Some starfighters are also equipped with an internal hyperdrive or connect to an external hyperdrive unit for faster-than-light travel. The primary weapon on most starfighters are laser cannons, with additional weapons like proton torpedoes boasting additional firepower. Some starfighters are also equipped with deflector shields which can be adjusted to protect specific areas of the ship.

== Starfighters appearing in the Original Trilogy ==
=== A-wing ===
The Kuat RZ-1 A-wing Interceptor is a class of starfighter, depicted as fast but fragile interceptors of the Rebel Alliance, conceived for high-speed surgical strikes, deep reconnaissance and escort fighter duty. A-wings first appear in Return of the Jedi (1983) during the climactic Battle of Endor. It gained popularity through its depiction in several video games, such as Battlefront II and 2015 Battlefront, and has been merchandised by several companies.

=== B-wing ===
A/SF-01 B-wing starfighter
- Star Wars vehicle
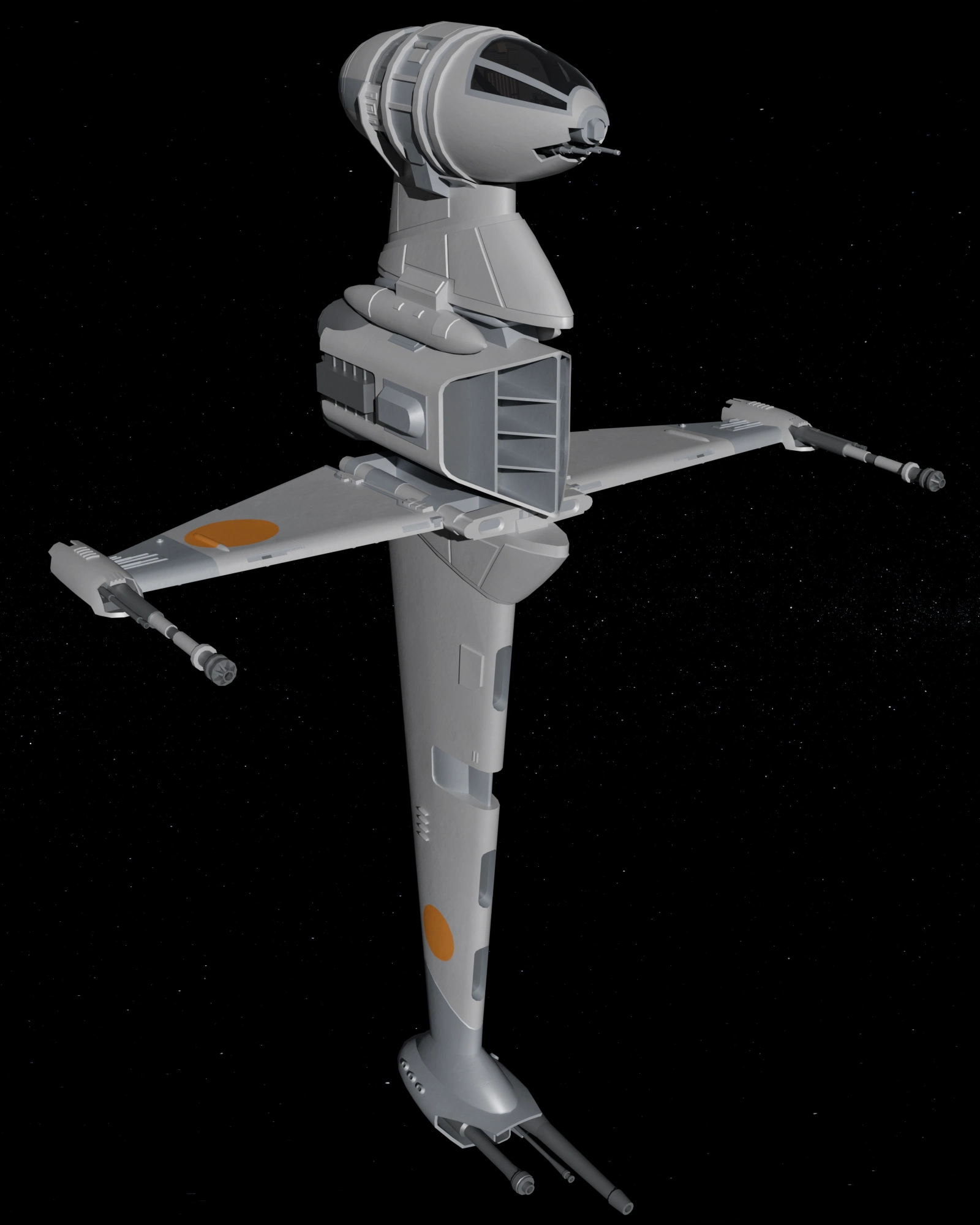
- First appearance: Return of the Jedi (1983)
- Created by: Slayn & Korpil

Information
- Affiliation: Rebel Alliance; New Republic; Resistance

General characteristics
- Class: Heavy assault starfighter
- Armaments: Standard configuration; Ion cannons (3); Heavy laser cannon (1); Twin autoblasters (1); Proton torpedo launchers (2)
- Defenses: Deflector shield generator; Sensor jammer
- Maximum speed: 2,390 G (maximum acceleration); 950 km/h (590 mph; maximum atmospheric speed); 91 MGLT (megalight per hour; subluminal speed); 2.0 HCR (hyperdrive class rating; superluminal speed)
- Propulsion: Hyperdrive motivator (1); Sublight engine with 4 thrusters
- Length: 16.9 meters (55 ft 5 in)
- Width: 2.9 meters (9 ft 6 in)
- Height: S-foils closed: 2.5 meters (8 ft 1 in); S-foils open: 7.3 meters (23 ft 11in)
- Population volume: 1 pilot

The A/SF-01 B-wing starfighter is a Rebel Alliance and New Republic starfighter. They first appear in Return of the Jedi (1983) and subsequently in the Star Wars expanded universe's books, comics, and games. It is commonly depicted as a heavy strike fighter. A variety of B-wing merchandise has been released by toy companies.

Origin and design

Although initial plans called for B-wings to appear in several scenes, its narrow appearance from some angles made it difficult to see against the backdrop of space. The ship's rotating cockpit stems from an initial design for the Millennium Falcon.

Depiction

The B-wing's origin in the Disney canon (as the Blade Wing) is as a "blockade buster" designed by the Mon Calamari engineer Quarrie, first depicted in the Star Wars Rebels second season episode "Wings of the Master." (In the previous Legends continuity, Admiral Ackbar helped design the B-wing). Quarrie designs the Blade Wing for the Rebel Alliance by combining aspects of previous ships built by the Verpine Slayn & Korpil corporation including the V-19 Torrent starfighter, H-60 Tempest bomber, and T-6 shuttle. While Quarrie's Blade Wing helps the crew of the Ghost break through an Imperial blockade, the prototype is plagued with a number of technical challenges. Senator Bail Organa later convinces Slayn & Korpil to work with Quarrie to fix these issues and create a production model, the A/SF-01.

The A/SF-01 is the most well-armed starfighter in the galaxy at the time it is introduced. With its eight modular weapon-mounting points, a single B-wing is capable of attacking and destroying enemy capital ships. However, it is also slower and less maneuverable than any other Rebel starfighter and requires the most maintenance. The B-wing's gyrostabilized cockpit allows the pilot to maintain a consistent horizon while the craft's body rotates around it, minimizing g-stresses on the pilot and letting them concentrate on flying and targeting. However, if the gyro-stabilization system is not kept in prime condition, it could fail under the tremendous pressure and lock up. The B-wing features S-foils similar in function to those of the X-wing fighter. Reference material also describes newer versions of the B-wing, designated Mark II, being developed; repurposed components of these fighters are used by the Resistance to construct troop transport ships.

Merchandise

Both Kenner and Hasbro released B-wing toys, the B-wing is part of two Micro Machines three-packs, and Lego has made several B-wing sets. A Micro Machines Alpha Fleet package includes models both of the B-wing's film appearance and of an initial production design. Decipher and Wizards of the Coast published B-wing cards for the Star Wars Customizable Card Game and Star Wars Trading Card Game, respectively. The second expansion pack for the X-Wing flight simulator, B-Wing, introduces the B-wing as a playable starfighter; several other LucasArts products also depict B-wings.

=== TIE fighter (and variants) ===
TIE fighters—and variants such as TIE interceptors and TIE bombers—appear throughout the original trilogy. They are usually not equipped with shields or a hyperdrive, which makes them mass-producible and allows for considerable weapon payloads, or alternatively, for high speed and agility. The pilot has to wear a pressurized suit, as TIE fighters also lack life support systems. Heavier and more advanced TIE craft appear throughout both the original and current Expanded Universes, often including shields and hyperdrives as well as heavier armor and weapons; the higher costs for these craft often relegate them to limited deployment.

=== X-wing ===
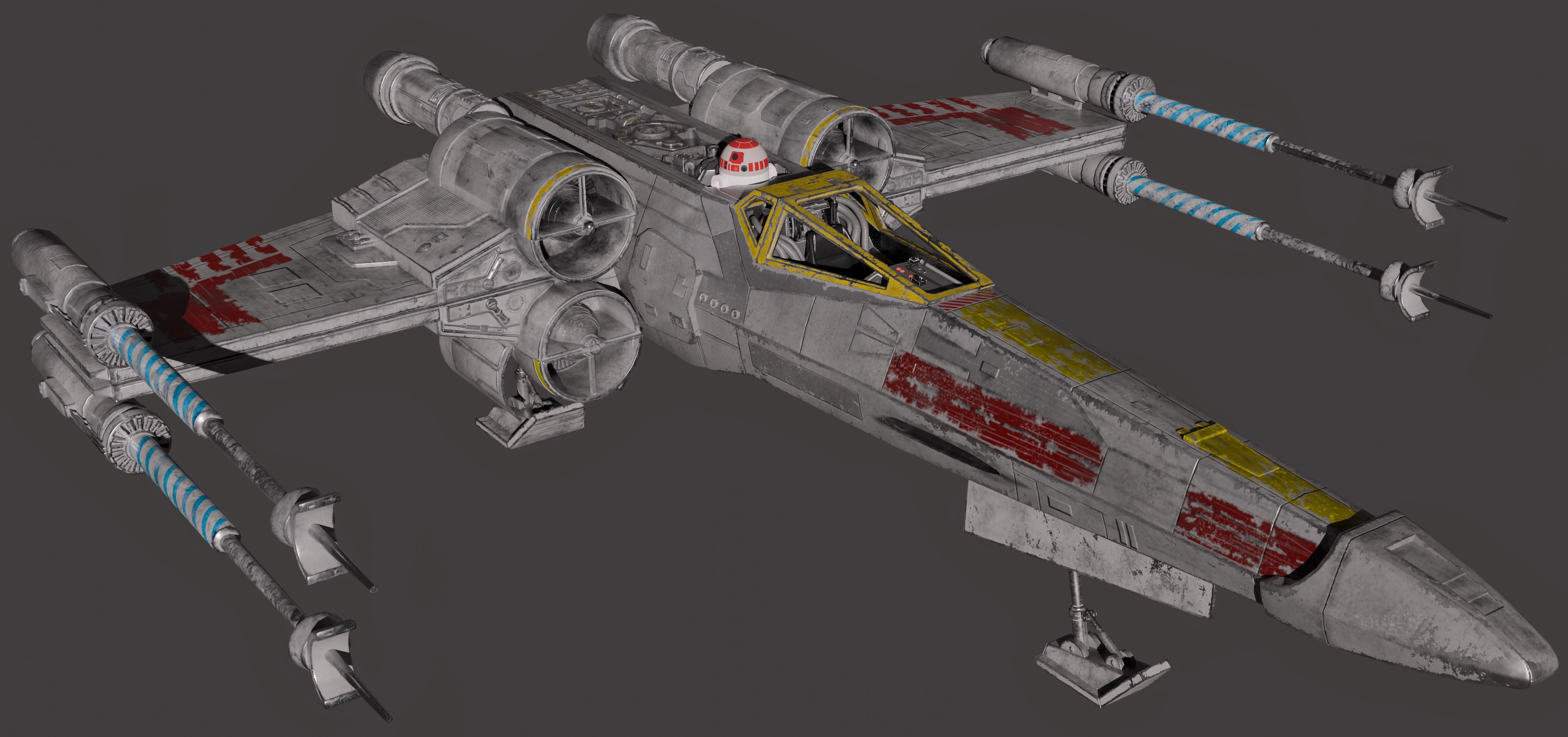
X-Wing

The X-wing starfighter, named for the distinctive shape made when its S-foils are in attack position, was a class of starfighter used by the Rebel Alliance in their conflict with the Galactic Empire. It made its theatrical debut, as the T-65B model, in Star Wars (1977) as the spacecraft piloted by Luke Skywalker and the Red Squadron when Luke destroyed the Death Star. The starfighter featured extensively in the Star Wars original trilogy and in the Expanded Universe that followed.

It would later reappear in the sequel trilogy and associated media with the T-70 and T-85 models, and has been merchandised as a variety of toys and models. It is commonly depicted as an aerospace superiority fighter with a secondary capability as strike fighter.

=== Y-wing ===
The Y-wing assault starfighter/bomber are depicted as the primary fighter-bombers of the Galactic Republic, Rebel Alliance (stripped-down and heavily modified version of the former Galactic Republic Y-wing), New Republic, and the newer Y-wing model for the Resistance; being ideally suited for anti-shipping, close air support, and ground attack missions. They made their theatrical appearance in Star Wars Episode IV: A New Hope (1977) and have featured in movies, television shows, and the Star Wars expanded universe's books, comics, and games.

== Starfighters appearing in the Prequel Trilogy ==
=== ARC-170 ===
The ARC-170 starfighter or Aggressive ReConnaissance-170 starfighter was flown by clone pilots of the Galactic Republic during the Clone Wars. They first appear in the opening battle sequence of Star Wars: Episode III – Revenge of the Sith (2005) and have featured in the 2008 Clone Wars television series. The fighter's name stems from "ART 170", the file name of the art that established the ship's appearance; during scripting it was simply referred to as the "Clone Fighter."

According to background material, the ARC-170 is a rugged and versatile starfighter that can fulfill a variety of roles. A joint venture between the Incom and Subpro corporations, the ARC-170 measures 14.5 m (48 ft) long, with a wingspan of 22.6 m (74 ft) and height of 4.78 m (15.7 ft). Its crew includes a pilot, a co-pilot/forward gunner, a tail gunner, and an astromech droid to act as navigator and make repairs. With its hyperdrive and five day's worth of supplies, the ARC-170 can operate deep behind enemy lines, where the variety of scanners and sensor jammers in its heavy nose help it conduct dangerous scouting missions. Its weaponry includes a pair of forward-facing medium laser cannons, mated with targeting rangefinders, which are powerful enough to punch through capital ship armor plating; two aft-facing laser cannons for staving off pursuing starfighters; and six proton torpedoes which allow it to conduct bombing missions. Deflector shielding protects the fighter from enemy attack and allows it to achieve hypersonic speed in an atmosphere by dispersing the heat created from air friction.

After the end of the Clone Wars, the ARC-170 would continue to serve under the Galactic Empire until replaced in favor of the TIE Fighter. It would also serve as the in-universe inspiration for Incom's next starfighter, the X-wing. Like the X-wing, the ARC-170 features S-foils, which open during combat to shed waste heat, enlarge the starfighter's deflector shields, and function as stabilizer surfaces during atmospheric flight.

=== Droid Tri-Fighter ===
A pair of Droid Tri-Fighters during the Battle of Coruscant

Droid Tri-fighters are droid starfighters used by Separatist forces during the Clone Wars. They made their first theatrical appearance in the opening battle of Revenge of the Sith (2005). Original plans to equip the fighters with boosters were abandoned when Lucas decided they were an unnecessary distraction in the already chaotic scene. Its curved braces are deliberately reminiscent of the Trade Federation's circular battleship.

The tri-fighter is a compact and heavily armed starfighter with three arms surrounding a rotating gyroscopic core. Measuring 5.4 m (18 ft) long, with a 1.96 m (6 ft 5 in) wingspan and 3.45 m (11.3 ft) width, its in-universe manufacturer are the Colicoids, the same species which produced Droideka. They are more dangerous than Vulture droids thanks to an advanced heuristic droid brain which better learns from enemy tactics and can be linked to coordinate multi-fighter attacks. While not as fast as a Jedi interceptor, the tri-fighter has three independent thrusters to give it impressive agility. Four laser cannons, one light cannon on each arm and one nose-mounted medium cannon, can fire together or independently. It can also carry between two and six missiles, including proton torpedoes, concussion missiles and buzz droids.

=== Geonosian starfighter ===
Two Geonosian starfighters in the First Battle of Geonosis

Geonosian Nantex-class Starfighters appear in the climactic Battle of Geonosis in Star Wars: Episode II – Attack of the Clones when they chase after a Republic attack gunship carrying Anakin Skywalker (Hayden Christensen), Obi-Wan Kenobi (Ewan McGregor) and Padmé Amidala (Natalie Portman). The craft was also set to appear in an air battle during which Republic attack gunships attack a Geonosian airstrip but the scenes were ultimately cut. The starfighter technically made its first appearance in the video game Star Wars: Jedi Starfighter which was released prior to the movie.

Within the Star Wars universe these craft were considered nimble fighters, working equally well in space or in an atmosphere, and afforded the pilot a 360° field of view. Formally known as the Nantex-class starfighter and produced by the Huppla Pasa Tisc Shipwrights Collective, the Geonosian fighter is 9.8 m (32 ft) long, 1.9 m (6 ft 3 in) wide and 2.2 m (7 ft 3 in) tall (excluding the cockpit bubble). In addition to a magnetically suspended laser cannon turret, the fighter is equipped with 100 independently aiming narrow-beam tractor/repulsor projectors. These projectors are used not only to grapple with other spacrcraft but to help maneuver the fighter by pulling or pushing against surrounding objects. While these fighters are said to possess tremendous acceleration and maneuverability thanks to a unique engine mount (also magnetically suspended), few of these fighters are exported as they are designed specifically around Geonosian senses and dexterity to operate.

=== Jedi starfighter ===
The Delta-7 Aethersprite-class light interceptors (better known as "Jedi starfighters") appear in Star Wars Episode II: Attack of the Clones (2002), when Obi-Wan Kenobi (Ewan McGregor) travels via Jedi starfighter to Kamino to investigate the attempted assassination of Padmé Amidala (Natalie Portman); he also flies a Jedi starfighter to Geonosis in an attempt to track down the bounty hunter Jango Fett (Temuera Morrison). Later, Plo Koon (Matt Sloan) flies a Jedi starfighter when he is shot down by clone troopers carrying out Darth Sidious' (Ian McDiarmid) Order 66 in Revenge of the Sith (2005). In the 2003 Clone Wars animated series, Anakin Skywalker is seen flying a customized Delta-7, called the Azure Angel, of which a Lego model was later made.

The Jedi starfighter's triangular shape stems from the shape of Imperial Star Destroyers in the original Star Wars trilogy. Industrial Light & Magic designer Doug Chiang identified the Jedi starfighter as one of the first designs that bridges the aesthetic between the prequel and original trilogies. Chiang noted that viewers' familiarity with the Star Destroyer's appearance and Imperial affiliation gives added symbolism to the Jedi craft's appearance and foreshadows the Empire's rise to power. A full-scale model of the starfighter was also created for filming purposes. During scenes taking place on the rain-swept landing pads of Kamino, the model had to be painted and specially prepared in order to resist any water damage.

Star Wars expanded universe material states that the Delta-7 was designed specifically with the Jedi's Force-aided reflexes in mind by stripping them down and making their controls as responsive as possible. Manufactured for the Jedi by Kuat Systems Engineering, the starfighter measures just 8 m (26 ft) long, 3.92 m (12.9 ft) wide and 1.44 m (4 ft 9 in) high, making it difficult to detect. An astromech droid fits in an off-center socket on the port side of the Delta-7, but the tiny fighter's size requires the droid's body be modified in order to fit (later Delta-7B models place the socket in front of the cockpit to allow full-sized astromech units). A pair of laser cannons and deflector shielding allows the Jedi pilot to engage in combat, though ideally as a last resort. Lacking an internal hyperdrive, the Jedi starfighter uses an external hyperspace transport wing to which it can attach for faster-than-light travel. Its two Novaldex J-44 "Jetforce" sublight engines are equipped with electromagnetic thrust nozzles that focus and time engine bursts to match the Jedi's abilities. This also makes the starfighter overwhelmingly difficult for a non-Jedi to pilot. When the Jedi were destroyed after Order 66, Kuat Systems Engineering designed a new starfighter that would be more manageable for non-Jedi pilots: the A-wing.

=== Jedi interceptor ===
The Eta-2 Actis-class light interceptors, also known as "Jedi interceptors", made their first theatrical in Star Wars Episode III: Revenge of the Sith (2005). In the opening space battle, Obi-Wan Kenobi (Ewan McGregor) and Anakin Skywalker (Hayden Christensen) pilot Jedi interceptors on a mission to rescue Chancellor Palpatine (Ian McDiarmid) from General Grievous. The craft's design was purposefully meant to echo the earlier Jedi starfighter and the TIE fighter, while its opening wing panels were influenced by a feature on Hasbro's toy model of the Jedi starfighter. For filming close-ups of the actors, a single full-scale model of the Jedi interceptor was created. Since Obi-Wan and Anakin's interceptors were individualized with their own color schemes, each actor would perform their scenes separately and switch out, allowing the model to be redressed in between.

In-universe material states that this new starfighter was meant to expand the Jedi's arsenal as they found themselves on the front lines of the Clone Wars, being smaller but possessing greater firepower than the earlier Delta-7 with twin laser cannons and twin ion cannons. Also built by Kuat Systems Engineering, the Eta-2 is even smaller than the Delta-7 at just 5.47 m (17.9 ft) long, 4.3 m (14 ft) wide and 2.5 m (8 ft 2 in) high with wings deployed, though with enough space for an astromech droid socket inside the port wing. It is also even more maneuverable with two ion engines that can deflect thrust up to 30 degrees. The Eta-2 has no deflector shields or bulky flight controls in order to save weight and maximize speed and agility, instead relying on the Jedi's Force abilities to compensate. In order to manage heat levels, the interceptor is fitted with S-foils on the tip of each wing which open to reveal radiator panels. After the Jedi were destroyed during Order 66, the Eta-2 would serve as the inspiration for the Galactic Empire's TIE fighter.

=== Naboo N-1 starfighter ===
The Naboo N-1 starfighter made its theatrical appearance in Star Wars: Episode I – The Phantom Menace. During the climactic Battle of Naboo, a squadron of the fighters attacked the orbiting Trade Federation Droid Control Ship Saak'ak. Anakin Skywalker (Jake Lloyd) accidentally steals a Naboo N-1 starfighter and pilots it into the Droid Control Ship's docking bay, destroying the vessel from the inside. N-1 starfighters also appear in the beginning of Star Wars: Episode II – Attack of the Clones escorting senator Padmé Amidala's (Natalie Portman) Naboo Royal Cruiser upon its arrival to Coruscant. The N-1 also appears at the end of the edited and remastered 2004 "Special Edition" DVD version of Return of the Jedi. A modified N-1 starfighter appears in the Disney + series The Book of Boba Fett (2022), built by Tatooine mechanic Peli Motto (Amy Sedaris) and used as a replacement for Din Djarin's (Pedro Pascal) destroyed Razor Crest. Djarin's N-1 starfighter is heavily featured in the third season of The Mandalorian (2023). The fighter technically first appeared as an unlockable vehicle in Star Wars: Rogue Squadron, which was released approximately six months before The Phantom Menace, and was available as a playable vehicle in the video games Star Wars: Battle for Naboo and Star Wars: Starfighter.

The N-1 initially had the same angular design as craft in the original Star Wars trilogy; only in later designs did it take on a streamlined appearance. A life-size model of a Naboo starfighter hangs suspended from the ceiling of the Blue Wing at the Boston Museum of Science, in Boston, Massachusetts. This 1:1 scale model was unveiled at the museum in April 2004, as a prelude to the Star Wars: Where Science Meets Imagination exhibit. The model was previously used as a prop during the filming of The Phantom Menace.

Based on in-universe background material, the N-1's sleek design exemplifies the philosophy of art and function in Naboo technology. At 11 m (36 ft) long, the starfighters are built by the Theed Palace Space Vessel Engineering Corps using a number of standard components in a custom-built spaceframe. The chromium finish on the starfighter's forward surfaces indicate its royal status as an escort for Naboo's Queen. The "rat-tail" finial of the main body serves dual roles as a high-voltage charge collector and receiver of encrypted information when the fighter is plugged in at the palace hangar, while the secondary finials contain engine heat sinks. Behind the pilot's cockpit, an astromech droid plugs in to perform in-flight navigation and maintenance, although the fighter is also equipped with a capable automatic pilot feature. Armament includes twin laser cannons and twin proton torpedo launchers with a capacity for 10 torpedoes.

In 2018 a test was conducted using the Autodesk Flow Design virtual wind tunnel program to look at the aerodynamic properties of several Star Wars starfighter models. Of those models which were tested, the N-1 was found to be the most aerodynamic of all with a drag coefficient of .1, which while somewhat poor compared to the real-life .02 rating of the F-4E Phantom was significantly better than all other starfighters tested.

=== Rogue-class starfighter ===
The Rogue-class starfighter appears in Revenge of the Sith as a starfighter piloted by the native Utapauns during the Battle of Utapau. Although featured in a full two-page spread in the Revenge of the Sith Incredible Cross-Sections book, the fighter's role was significantly reduced in the final film. This was due to the fact that the P-38's digital model, being a late addition to the film, was not completed to the level originally planned, and so was relegated to a background craft. Reference material describes the Rogue-class starfighter being purchased in large numbers by local governments in the Mid and Outer Rims, and by the Separatists, the latter of whom allow MagnaGuard droids to pilot them combat with the Republic. 12.7 m (42 ft) long by 12.88 m (42.3 ft) wide and 2.71 m (8 ft 11 in) high, the starfighter features two laser cannons, deflector shields, sensor jammers, and a hyperdrive. These systems are powered by wing reactors, each of which can annihilate up to 3.1 kg (6.8 lb) of fuel per second. The Rogue-class would gain prominence in Star Wars: The Clone Wars, most notably as Cad Bane's personal starfighter Xanadu Blood. Among the modifications made to the starfighter are a roomier cabin for three passengers, engines which can run 'silent' for brief periods of time, and a rare cloaking device.

=== Soulless One ===
The Soulless One was General Grievous' personal starfighter, a customized version of a Belbullab-22 starfighter, which made its first theatrical appearance in Revenge of the Sith (2005). The starfighter is also mockingly referred to as "Spineless One" by enemies due to Grievous' tendency to escape from danger with it. After Obi-Wan Kenobi (Ewan McGregor) defeated General Grievous on Utapau, he used Grievous' starfighter to escape from his clone troopers attempting to carry out Order 66 and rendezvoused with Yoda and Senator Bail Organa (Jimmy Smits). Obi-Wan later pilots the starfighter with the infant Luke Skywalker to Nar Shaddaa before selling it for transportation to Tatooine, leaving its fate unknown.

=== V-wing ===
The V-wing Fighter or Alpha-3 Nimbus-class V-Wing made its theatrical appearance in the Revenge of the Sith (2005), as the Galactic Republic is formally transformed into the Galactic Empire. Originally, animation director Rob Coleman proposed that TIE fighters be featured to signify this transition, but George Lucas pointed out that (in the film's chronology) there were nineteen years between the events of Revenge of the Sith and the original Star Wars. Allowing additional time for the TIE fighter to be introduced, a new starfighter was created instead, purposefully similar in both design and sound to the TIE fighter while also resembling the Jedi's Delta-7 starfighter.

According to Star Wars canon, the V-wing's design combines elements of the ARC-170, V-19 and Delta-7, making it an ideal escort fighter. Introduced by Kuat Systems Engineering during the final days of the Clone Wars, the compact V-wing is just 7.9 m (26 ft) long and 3.8 m (12 ft) wide, with its height expanding to 5.84 m (19.2 ft) when the wings are deployed. An astromech droid assists the pilot with in-flight navigation and maintenance. Two pairs of laser cannons on swivel mounts in the wing struts provide a rapid-fire offensive punch. The V-wing is far more maneuverable than the ARC-170, making it perfect for combating swarms of Tri-fighters and Vulture droids, while a pair of powerful ion engines can propel the fighter to a top atmospheric speed of 52,000 km/h (32,000 mph). In order to save on weight to make the fighter so fast and maneuverable, it does not feature a hyperdrive or pressurized cockpit. Additionally, folding wings on either side of the hull contain radiator panels to manage heat levels during intense activity.

=== Vulture Droid ===
The Vulture Droid or Variable Geometry Self-Propelled Battle Droid is a droid starfighter that made its theatrical appearance in The Phantom Menace (1999) as part of the Trade Federation's space fleet and appeared again, slightly different, in Revenge of the Sith (2005), as a Separatist space unit (likely coming from the Trade Federation, which sells its droid forces to the CIS, as established in Attack of the Clones). Original designs depicted the droid starfighter not as a droid itself, but instead piloted by a battle droid. In order to demonstrate that it was both a robotic being as well as vehicle, it was decide to give the vulture droid a transformative element, allowing its wings to fold down and serve as legs. Two 18" maquettes of the vulture droid were built - one in ship mode and one in walking mode - to help create the digital model. In order to represent the idea of three vulture droids sharing one "brain," animators purposefully linked the motion of each three-ship flight when creating the climactic battle of The Phantom Menace.

As per Star Wars sources, vulture droids were originally produced by the Xi Char cathedral factories of Hoar Chall Engineering for the Trade Federation before later becoming a mainstay of Separatist fighter squadrons during the Clone Wars. At 3.5 m (11 ft) long when in flight mode, these droid starfighters are designed to engage the enemy in overwhelming swarms, partially to overcome their lack of cunning and resourcefulness. Electromagnetic thrust-vectoring makes vulture droids elusive targets to hit, powered by concentrated solid fuel slugs which provide tremendous power but with the drawback of limited range. For armament the droid carries a pair of twin blaster cannons in the wings while two energy torpedo launchers are mounted in the main body; when the wings retract they conceal the blasters and protect them from microparticle and atmospheric corrosion. When necessary, the droid can uses its repulsorlifts to land and transform into a four-legged walking configuration to occupy territory, angling its energy torpedo launchers for antipersonnel use. Originally, vulture droids were controlled by a central command ship, but were later given a limited degree of independence.

A variant of the vulture droid is the Hyena Bomber Droid, with a larger, sturdier hull and larger wings. It also has a second hull with downward-facing photoreceptors for precision bomb dropping. The Hyena Bomber Droid made its first appearance in the 2008 Clone Wars television series.

== Starfighters appearing in the Sequel Trilogy ==
=== Resistance Bomber ===
MG-100 StarFortress SF-17
- Star Wars vehicle
- First appearance: Star Wars: The Last Jedi (2017)
- Created by: Slayn & Korpil

Information
- Affiliation: New Republic; First Order; Resistance

General characteristics
- Class: Heavy Bomber
- Armaments: Laser cannon turrets (3); Medium laser cannons (6); Up to 1,048 proton bombs
- Defenses: Deflector shield generator; Electronic counter-measures
- Propulsion: Sublight ion thrusters; Hyperdrive
- Length: 29.67 meters (97 ft 4 in)
- Width: 15.3 meters (50 ft 2 in)
- Height: 21.65 meters (71 ft)
- Population volume: Pilot (1); Flight engineer (1); Bombardier (1); Gunners (2)

The MG-100 StarFortress SF-17 heavy bomber is a fictional Resistance starfighter which made its first theatrical appearance in Star Wars: The Last Jedi (2017), attempting to buy the Resistance fleet time to escape from the First Order. They have subsequently appeared in other Star Wars media. The StarFortress is depicted as a heavy bomber able to unleash devastating firepower on the enemy but also capable of being adapted to a variety of other roles.

Origin and design

Director Rian Johnson noted how the original Star Wars borrowed heavily from the aesthetics of World War II with its dogfights and submarine-like spaceships but never depicted the type of aerial bombardment which played a critical role in the conflict. Johnson had the idea of a design heavily inspired by the Boeing B-52 Stratofortress, but when James Clyne presented him with concept art of a vertical bomber, he liked it so much he rewrote the script to accommodate this vertical element. Making the bombers hulking and slow-moving was also a purposeful choice by Johnson to emphasize the tension of the scene as they attack the First Order, stating "the temptation is always there to make ships sleek and cool looking. The notion of working against that was intriguing." The bombs themselves had also been originally modeled after those carried by B-52s but were adapted into a spherical design to more closely match Star Wars visuals.

Depiction

Within Star Wars canon, the MG-100 StarFortress is described as being acquired by the nascent New Republic to finish their conflict with the remnants of the Empire. Carrying a payload far greater than any starfighter, the heavy bomber's bomb bay is detachable from the main fuselage to allow for easier stowage and post-flight maintenance. Ordnance carried in the bomb bay are propelled along their racks via sequenced electromagnetic clips, giving them sufficient momentum to continue towards their target even when operating in microgravity. Slow and ungainly, the MG-100 StarFortress carries a number of laser cannons - some remotely operated and others mounted in transparisteel-enclosed ball turrets - but is heavily dependent on escort fighters to protect it. With the end of the war, the subsequent demilitarization effort saw many of these bombers sent to the scrapyards, but a number of decommissioned StarFortresses were repurposed for civilian use in search and rescue, exploration, and firefighting. Some of these found their way to the Resistance where they were used for military and non-military missions.

The StarFortresses of Cobalt and Crimson Squadrons were described as already being on a mercy mission and so unable to take part in the attack on Starkiller Base as depicted in Star Wars: The Force Awakens (2015). The survivors of this mission returned in time to help the Resistance evacuate from D'Qar as depicted in the opening scene of The Last Jedi, and when the First Order dreadnought Fulminatrix arrives, the entire force is sent to stop it. Only Paige Tico's bomber reaches the target and it is thanks to her efforts that the Fulminatrix is destroyed, though at a heavy cost.

Analysis

Theo Milonopoulos, an assistant professor at the Naval War College, cites the attack by the Resistance Bombers in The Last Jedi as an example of what Clausewitz calls the "victory disease." With early success, military commanders suffering from this 'disease' can exceed their operational mandate and inadvertently undermine strategic considerations. In this instance, he argues that Poe Dameron (Oscar Isaac) overshot the "culminating point of victory" in the battle when he orders the bombers to destroy the Fulminatrix. "Doing so proves both operationally unnecessary in facilitating the Resistance evacuation and excessively costly through the mass slaughter of trained starfighter pilots needed for the Resistance’s survival."

Dr. Robert Farley of the University of Kentucky also cites the Resistance Bomber attack scene as being indicative of the Interwar period debate regarding the value of air strikes against surface vessels. Just as the Resistance bombers showed that small craft could take out large ships (albeit at significant cost), so too did the sinking of the SMS Ostfriesland as part of a demonstration by General William "Billy" Mitchell in arguing for the primacy of bombers. Ultimately, Farley argues that technological progress has made some of these arguments irrelevant, since modern surface vessels are no longer expected to absorb much damage.

== Starfighters appearing in other Star Wars media ==
=== E-wing ===
An improved successor to the X-wing, the E-wing first appeared in Legends continuity in Dark Horse Comics' Dark Empire series, and was later made canon in the twenty-third issue of Star Wars: Poe Dameron, followed by its television debut in Star Wars: Ahsoka. They are one of few Expanded Universe vehicles to be a part of Micro Machines' Action Fleet line. Armed with three Taim & Bak IX9 Medium Laser Cannons and two proton torpedo launchers, the E-wing's aerodynamic frame made the fighter highly maneuverable and exceptional in atmospheric flight. Its Class 1 Hyperdrive allowed for extended reconnaissance missions and rapid strategic redeployment. As part of a larger force, the E-wing filled a versatile mid-range multirole combat aircraft or light torpedo bomber.

=== Gauntlet Fighter ===
A Gauntlet Fighter, or Kom'rk-class fighter, is a Mandalorian class of ship. Larger than most starfighters, it can carry a larger crew and accommodate passengers. They were introduced in Star Wars: The Clone Wars being used by the Mandalorian splinter group Death Watch. Another one known as the Nightbrother later served as Darth Maul's personal craft in Star Wars Rebels. Kom'rk-class fighter/transports are equipped with four laser cannons, a Class 1 hyperdrive, and space to carry up to 24 soldiers. Two versions of the starfighter model exist, one 68 m (223 ft) long and a smaller variant 52.3 m (172 ft) long.

=== Fanblade starfighter ===
Asajj Ventress flies the fanblade in the animated Star Wars: Clone Wars series. Just as Ventress' appearance was inspired by a Samurai stance, the ship itself has Asian influences: its design is based on a sensu folding fan. Background literature refers to these as Ginivex-class fanblade starfighters, with only six built for Asajj's personal use. At 13.1 metres (43 ft) long, the starfighters' retractable solar sail helps make the ship extremely fast with a powerful deflector shield but also makes it easier to spot. It is also equipped with a Class 1 hyperdrive and a rotating laser cannon mounted on either end of the solar sail.

=== U-wing ===
UT-60D U-wing starfighter/support craft
- Star Wars vehicle
- First appearance: Rogue One: A Star Wars Story (2016)
- Created by: Incom Corporation

Information
- Affiliation: Rebel Alliance; New Republic

General characteristics
- Class: Starfighter/Gunship/Troop transport
- Armaments: Taim & Bak KX7 laser cannons (2); Infantry-based heavy weapons (up to 2, optional)
- Defenses: Chempat deflector shield generator
- Maximum speed: 2,600 G (maximum acceleration); 950 km/h (590 mph; maximum atmospheric speed); 95 MGLT (megalight per hour; subluminal speed); 1.0 HCR (hyperdrive class rating; superluminal speed)
- Propulsion: Incom GBk-585 hyperdrive motivators (4); Incom 4J.7 fusial thrust engines (4)
- Length: 23.99 meters (78 ft 8 in)(S-foils forward)
- Width: 8.54 meters (28 ft) (S-foils forward)
- Height: 3.51 meters (11 ft 6 in)
- Population volume: 2 pilots; 2 door gunners (optional); 8 passengers

The UT-60D U-wing starfighter/support craft is a Rebel troop transport/gunship model manufactured by Incom Corporation for the purpose of supporting special operations forces insertion and extraction into denied areas from strategic distances. Used to penetrate enemy zones to drop off Rebel infantry, provide close air support, and extract them upon mission completion. U-wings first appeared in the movie Rogue One, where they were pivotal in the transport and protection of the Rebel Alliance's ground forces during the Battle of Scarif.

Origin and design

Director Gareth Edwards wanted Rogue One to be grounded in the aesthetics of the Korean or Vietnam War in order to contrast it with the more World War II look of the original Star Wars film. Thus when it came time to design a unique ship for the film's heroes to travel around in, he wanted it to be akin to a "Huey" version of the X-wing. While experimenting with different models and names ("Z-wing, R-wing, Q-wing, etc."), the final design picked was in part because it looked like an inverted X-wing. For filming interior scenes, a full-size U-wing cockpit was built and mounted on a manually controlled gimbal in front of a wall of LED panels. The panels were used instead of traditional film lights so that more natural lighting could be simulated.

Depiction

In-universe material states that the UT-60 was the last starfighter design created by Incom Corporation before the company was nationalized by the Galactic Empire. Originally intended as a transport ship for couriers and planetary defense forces, the last of the UT-60D starfighters to be built were secured for the Rebel Alliance thanks to the efforts of Senator Bail Organa (Jimmy Smits). Rebel mechanics and technicians transformed their U-wings into sturdy gunships and troop transports for Rebel Alliance Special Forces (SpecForces) making dangerous insertions into Imperial territory. The U-wing's engine configuration was inspired in part by the X-wing, and like the X-wing featured S-foils but in a variable-sweep wing format, opening them to improve atmospheric maneuverability and enlarge its deflector shield. However the ship was not designed for the tight turns necessary for dogfights, and while the U-wing did feature a hyperdrive for faster-than-light travel, extended operations with a full passenger complement would quickly deplete the vessel's life support systems. The U-wing's two laser cannons could be supplemented by a pair of infantry heavy weapons handled by dedicated door gunners.

=== V-19 Torrent ===
The V-19 Torrent starfighter first appeared in the 2003 Clone Wars animated series and have appeared in other media related to the Clone Wars. Background material states the V-19 had impressive speed and maneuverability, making it a tricky starfighter to fly. It had three S-foils that functioned like those on the X-wing and was equipped with two laser cannons and twin concussion missile launchers. At the beginning of the Clone Wars, V-19 starfighters did not have hyperdrives for faster-than-light travel, instead relying on external hyperspace transport rings to which they would attached. Later models were modified to be equipped with an internal hyperdrive. The V-19 would later be succeeded by the V-wing.

=== Z-95 Headhunter ===
The Z-95 Headhunter is a class of starfighter which was first described in the Brian Daley's 1979 novel Han Solo at Stars' End as having swing-wings and a bubble cockpit. In the 1980–81 comic strip adaptation, they are depicted like triangular, twin-tailed airplanes. It was next depicted in Tatooine Manhunt (1988), an adventure book for Star Wars: The Roleplaying Game, with artwork based on an early Joe Johnston production sketch. At least as early as A Guide to the Star Wars Universe (1994), it was established that the Z-95 was the precursor to the X-wing. The Z-95 is featured variously in the Expanded Universe, including the X-wing: Rogue Squadron comic series (c. 1996–1997), as well as in 2008's The Clone Wars television series, in which it is used by the Galactic Republic.

The Z-95 Headhunter is described in the Star Wars Databank as a versatile snub-fighter despite being outdated at the time of the Clone Wars. Incom Corporation originally designed the Z-95 for planetary defense forces, and while lacking many features like a hyperdrive or astromech droid it was appreciated for its armaments and internal environmental controls. The Republic commissioned upgraded models of the Z-95 for their clone pilots which featured more powerful weaponry and deflector shields, as well as superior endurance and adaptability. At the beginning of the one-shot comic Age of Resistance: Rose Tico, a young Paige and Rose Tico find out who is a better pilot of the Z-95.

== See also ==
- List of Star Wars spacecraft
- Star Wars planetary vehicles
- Weapons in science fiction

== Bibliography ==
- Barr, Tricia; Bray, Adam; Horton, Cole; Horton (2017). Star Wars: The Visual Encyclopedia. United States: DK Publishing. ISBN 978-1-4654-5962-6.
- Barr, Patricia; Bray, Adam; Jones, Matt; Horton, Cole; Wallace, Daniel; Windham, Ryder (2019). Ultimate Star Wars New Edition. United States: DK Publishing. ISBN 978-1-4654-7900-6.
- Dougherty, Kerrie; Fry, Jason; Hidalgo, Pablo; Reynolds, David West; Saxton, Curtis; Windham, Ryder (2020). Star Wars Complete Vehicles New Edition. United States: DK Publishing. ISBN 978-0-7440-2057-1.
- Luceno, James; Reynolds, David West; Windham, Ryder; Fry, Jason; Hidalgo, Pablo (2018). Star Wars: The Complete Visual Dictionary. United States: DK Publishing. ISBN 978-1-4654-7547-3.
- Walker, Landry Q. (2018). Star Wars Encyclopedia of Starfighters and Other Vehicles. United States: DK Publishing. ISBN 9781465482716.
- Windham, Ryder (2019). Star Wars Rebel Starfighters Owner's Workshop Manual. United States: Insight Editions. ISBN 978-1-68383-936-1.
- Windham, Ryder (2018). Star Wars YT-1300 Millennium Falcon Owner's Workshop Manual. United States: Insight Editions. ISBN 978-1-68383-528-8.
