= Galactic Republic =

Fictional state in the Star Wars universe

- Star Wars organization
- Emblem and Flag of the Galactic Republic

In-universe information
- Type: Federal parliamentary republic with an executive Chancellery
- Founded: c. 25,000 BBY (Old Republic); 1000 BBY (Modern Republic)
- Fate: Reorganized 19 BBY, into the Galactic Empire; Restored 4 ABY, as the New Republic
- Location: Star Wars galaxy (Core Worlds)
- Leader: Galactic Senate (legislature) Supreme Chancellor (executive): Tarsus Valorum (around 1000 BBY); Finis Valorum (40–32 BBY); Sheev Palpatine (32–19 BBY); Judicial Department (judiciary)
- Key people: Yoda; Obi-Wan Kenobi; Mace Windu
- Affiliations: Jedi Order; Clone Army; Sith (Secretly, 32 BBY-19 BBY)
- Enemies: Sith; Confederacy of Independent Systems (Separatists)
- Capital: Coruscant
- Currency: Republic Datary (Galactic Credit)
- Official language: Basic

The Galactic Republic, commonly known as the Republic, is a fictional state in the Star Wars universe that predates the formation of the Galactic Empire. It is prominently featured in the prequel trilogy of Star Wars films, offering a glimpse into its history and functioning. In the original trilogy, which takes place after the events of the prequels, the Republic is referred to as the Old Republic, suggesting its long-established nature. In the prequel era, which takes place during the last years of the Republic, the term "Old Republic" referred to the Galactic Republic of ancient time, which was reorganized into the modern High Republic, a thousand years before the Battle of Yavin (1000 BBY).

The Republic is portrayed as a democratic republic-union of sovereign planets, analogous to the United Nations, that has sustained itself peacefully for over twenty-five thousand years but was tied up in layers of bureaucracy, its government ineffective and prone to corruption. A decentralized system where planets are represented and maintain a degree of independence, the Republic's authority is primarily focused on inter-planetary relations and trade, to foster cooperation and maintain order among their members. It was mainly overseen by the Galactic Senate, the Republic's legislative branch, consisting of elected officials from each system and populated world. These officials elected a head of state for the Office of the Supreme Chancellor, the Republic's executive branch. The Chancellor and Senate were moderated by an impartial Judicial Department, the Republic's judiciary branch.

Pre-Clone Wars era, the Republic did not have a standing military; it was protected by the Jedi Order, who served as peacekeepers throughout the Star Wars galaxy. After the end of the Galactic Empire, the New Republic was founded. It was enforced by the former Rebel Alliance, reorganized into the New Republic Military. The consolidation of the New Republic is depicted in The Mandalorian as it sought to wipe out remnants of the Imperial forces and was eventually destroyed by the First Order, under Supreme Leader Snoke's direction, in Star Wars: The Force Awakens.

== Fictional history (canon) ==
=== Fictional timeline (canon) ===
In the Star Wars chronology, the destruction of the first Death Star during the Battle of Yavin serves as a significant event used to establish the calendar era. The battle is depicted in Star Wars: Episode IV - A New Hope (1977), the first film released in the franchise. Following this event, the conventional notation for standard years is "BBY" (Before the Battle of Yavin) and "ABY" (After the Battle of Yavin). Alternative notations such as "BSW4" ("Before Star Wars Episode 4") and "ASW4" ("After Star Wars Episode 4") may be used.

=== Background ===
In the Star Wars universe, the earliest history of the galaxy before the Republic is not extensively explored. However, it is believed that various species, including humans, evolved in the Core Worlds and eventually became dominant throughout the galaxy. According to the hypothesis, humans are thought to have originated from Coruscant, a central planet in the Star Wars galaxy. From there, they settled in other Core Worlds, such as Alderaan, and eventually expanded their presence to colonize other planets across the galaxy. According to Smith (1996), the origin of hyperdrive technology in the Star Wars galaxy is uncertain. It is speculated that hyperdrive might have been invented by the humans of the Core Worlds, or it could have been introduced to them by alien traders from the Unknown Regions. Regardless of its origin, there is a consensus that hyperspace travel predated the Republic and played a crucial role in enabling the formation of a "galactic civilization." It allowed for interstellar travel and facilitated the establishment of central governments spanning multiple planetary systems, ultimately leading to the rise of the Galactic Republic.

=== Old Republic ===
According to the large body of films and other fiction that belong to the Star Wars franchise, the Old Republic was formed 25,000 years before the events of Star Wars: Episode IV – A New Hope (1977) when the first "Galactic Constitution" was signed on Coruscant, after hyperdrive connected many worlds in the Core and enabled the establishment of an interstellar central government. Coruscant became the capital planet of the Old Republic, the Galactic Empire, and the New Republic, and the entire surface evolved into one big city, with skyscrapers reaching more than 5,000 levels. The Republic was made up of several hundred thousand worlds, and each planet or system had representation in the Republic Senate, which comprised most of the Republic's Legislative Branch and the government itself. It started merely as an economic and protective alliance, mainly among the Core worlds. It eventually expanded to the Colonies and other outlying worlds and regions, becoming a superpower rather than an alliance, and it became the sole superpower in the galaxy.

The Core Worlds, such as Coruscant and Alderaan, were notable for their prosperity; later, they were matched by the Colonies, while the Inner Rim and Expansion Region were slightly less secure and poorer than the Core Worlds or Colonies. The Mid Rim was an unsafe region that saw much of the fighting in the Galactic Civil War on planets such as Naboo and Kashyyyk, as it was far from the Republic's military concentration in the Core. The Outer Rim was the most unsafe place in the galaxy: both the Republic and the Empire were unable to gain sufficient de facto hold to maintain order, leading to lawlessness, widespread violence, and crime syndicates; many key battles of the Clone Wars took place here. A large part of the Outer Rim, including Tatooine was traditionally ruled by the Hutts and therefore it was considered to be in the galactic Oversector known as Hutt Space. This is despite Tatooine and the rest of the binary star system, actually located beyond Hutt Space, in the Arkanis Sector.

As the Republic expanded, it came into contact with the slave empire of Zygerria. Because slavery was disallowed in the Republic, it disliked the Zygerrian Empire, as slavery was central to the Empire's political and economic system; consequently, the Empire refused to become part of the Republic. The Republic and Jedi declared war on the Empire and won. The Empire was reduced to a small, harmless alliance on Zygerria.

==== Sith Empire and reforms ====
The Sith (which formed in the Republic's early years) return to their original strength and invaded Malachor. The first Sith War began, which led to the demise of the first Republic. The power of the new Sith Empire increased as the Republic decreased. The Republic and Jedi forces failed to keep the Empire's Forces out of Republic Space. Soon, the Sith became a second superpower. Around this time, an ancestor of Pre Vizsla stole the Darksaber from the Jedi Temple. Around 1000 years prior to Star Wars, the Dark Age began, and the Old Republic was brought to the brink of collapse, but with the Liberation of Coruscant, the Sith Empire collapsed first. After the Sith Empire was defeated c. 1032 BBY, the Old Republic reformed and became a democracy known as the Galactic High Republic. It demilitarized at the Ruusan Reformation, shortly after the Seventh Battle of Ruusan. Following the end of the two millennia long Jedi-Sith War, Darth Bane emerged as the sole survivor, where he and his Sith successors, had secretly plotted the corruption of the Republic, from within. This process took centuries, and was called the Grand Plan.

=== High Republic ===
The multimedia project Star Wars: The High Republic depicts the galaxy 200 years before The Phantom Menace.

The Republic began to diplomatically influence its neighboring worlds, as it reforms itself after the perpetual Jedi-Sith War, rather than conquer them by force. The High Republic era would last for 1,013 years. In 1032 BBY, the reformation of the Republic, is considered to be the ancient galactic government's "formation". This meant the Republic expanded slowly. The Republic finally took control of the Mid Rim. Power blocs formed out of the Republic, but the Jedi kept order. The Republic was peaceful but became corrupt, and a Core-Rim distrust formed. After Supreme Chancellor Finis Valorum came to power, a standoff between the Trade Federation and the Republic, had led to the Invasion, and the subsequent Battle of Naboo (32 BBY), as was depicted in Star Wars: Episode I – The Phantom Menace. This resulted in the Trade Federation losing Naboo and putting a dent in the TF Megacorporation.

While the Republic flourished, the Empire of Zygerria tried to cause a war, known as the Zygerrian War. However, after a few minor battles, the Zygerrians quickly withdrew their army, since it stood no chance in this war.

==== Separatist Crisis ====
Count Dooku: 'As I explained to you earlier, I'm quite convinced that 10,000 more systems will rally to our cause with your support, gentlemen.' (...)
Wat Tambor: 'The Techno Union army is at your disposal, Count.'
San Hill: 'The Banking Clan will sign your treaty.'
Dooku: 'Good, very good. Our friends from the Trade Federation have pledged their support, and when their battle droids are combined with yours, we shall have an army greater than any in the galaxy. The Jedi will be overwhelmed. The Republic will agree to any demands we make.'

— Fragment from the Separatist council meeting on Geonosis, portrayed in Attack of the Clones

Several trade organizations represented in the Senate, such as the Trade Federation and Commerce Guild, kept armies of droids to protect their profits and occasionally took advantage of this, such as when the Trade Federation invaded and occupied Naboo. Individual sectors also maintained their security forces, such as the Naboo Security Force or the CorSec from Corellia, and these were sometimes used to combat small threats. However, there was no centralized and official military of the Republic. The Trade Federation and other cartels within the Republic desired that the Republic government lack significant central military power so that it could not enforce any legal regulations on their business.

Dissatisfied with several problems in the Republic, such as ineffectual government, heavy taxes, and perceived favoritism of the Core Worlds over the Outer Rim planets, the Confederacy of Independent Systems (CIS) was formed in 24 BBY: several systems seceded from the Republic and formed a new state, thus triggering the Separatist Crisis. The CIS was ostensibly headed by former Jedi Master Count Dooku (although Palpatine was actually in command of both sides), who gained much popularity among critics of the Republic after his scathing Raxus Address outlining the problems of the Republic, leading many systems to side with him and form the Confederacy. The Separatists became a huge threat to the Republic after some of the galaxy's mega-corporations allied with the CIS, as they possessed vast resources and private armies of battle droids. A Military Creation Act was proposed in the Republic Senate, strongly opposed by many of the Republic's pacifist leaders, such as Padmé Amidala, the Queen of Naboo, who feared the possibility of war. But most of the Senate advocated a permanent, official, and central military to oppose the Separatist threat. Supporters of the Act include Orn Free Taa of Ryloth and Ask Aak of Malastare. With the formation of the Confederacy of Independent Systems on Raxus Prime, a galactic wide Cold War between the Confederacy and the Republic had begun. The relatively peaceful tensions turned hot with the Battle of Geonosis. Therefore, the Galactic Cold War had become a Galactic Conventual War known as the Clone Wars.

However, a Clone Army had already been created in secret on the planet Kamino on the edge of the galaxy ten years earlier, commissioned without authorization by Master Sifo-Dyas, a former Jedi perceiving chaos in the galaxy. When it became clear the Confederacy had no intention of negotiating, the Republic quickly accepted the Army made for them, and it was dubbed the Grand Army of the Republic.

==== Clone Wars ====
Despite the high quality of its armaments and cloned troops, the Republic's war effort was initially hindered because most of the major industrial companies in the galaxy had, under the aegis of the Techno Union, sided with the Confederacy. Eventually, though, the Republic became a humongous superpower not only economically but also militarily. The rapid militarization of the Republic during the Clone Wars, overseen by Supreme Chancellor Palpatine, had far-reaching effects. The Confederacy won most battles in the first year of the Clone Wars. During the second and middle year of the Clone Wars however, the Republic defended itself from Separatist attacks and retaliated with its own assaults, many of which were successful. During the third and final year of the Clone Wars, the Republic won many offensive battles in the Mid Rim and pushed the Separatist forces back to the Outer Rim with its "Outer Rim Sieges" campaign.

==== Fall of the Republic ====
During the Clone Wars, the Senate increasingly granted enormous amounts of power to Palpatine, who was the Commander-in-Chief. Such actions were deemed justified in the name of security and were considered a perfectly reasonable way to increase the wartime government's efficiency. Eventually, Palpatine and his office gained enough political power to equal the Senate.

Tension between Palpatine and the Jedi grew as the war progressed. Many members of the Jedi Council remained skeptical of Palpatine's growing power. In time, the Jedi believed that Palpatine would not surrender his emergency powers, nor his position (which had long gone over-term) by the end of the war. This suspicion was also shared by some senators, including Padmé Amidala of Naboo, Bail Organa of Alderaan, and Mon Mothma of Chandrila.

After the death of Separatist leaders Count Dooku and General Grievous (the Head of State of the Confederacy and Commander of the Separatist Army, respectively), and the discovery that Palpatine was actually Darth Sidious, the Sith Lord behind the war, the Jedi activated their contingency plans. And finally, Anakin's massacring the Separatist Council on Mustafar, including their representative Nute Gunray, who Anakin had saved for last.

==== Order 66 ====
A small group of experienced Jedi led by Mace Windu attempted to arrest Palpatine for treason. Palpatine killed all but Windu with minimal effort, and engaged Windu in a lightsaber duel. Windu appeared to have won, but was prevented from executing Palpatine by the intervention of Anakin Skywalker, at which point Palpatine killed Windu. At that moment, Skywalker took the title and name of Darth Vader, pledging himself to the dark side as a Lord of the Sith.

Shortly afterwards, Palpatine secretly issued "Order 66", compelling the Clone army to exterminate all Jedi. Because of inhibitor chips implanted inside the clones' heads, the clones were forced to kill most of the Jedi in what would later become known as the Great Jedi Purge. The Jedi Padawans remaining on Coruscant were eliminated by Darth Vader, formerly known as Anakin Skywalker, and his personal legion.

=== Galactic Empire vs. Rebel Alliance ===
Before the conclusion of the Clone Wars, Palpatine addressed the Senate. He related the story of an unsuccessful "assassination attempt" on his life by the Jedi. Claiming that it was a "rebellion" and that their next move would be to kill all the Senators, he declared the Jedi Order to be enemies of the Republic. Palpatine announced that the Galactic Republic should be reorganized into the Galactic Empire, and he should be the emperor for life. Deluded by Palpatine's charisma and skill (and perhaps also by his considerable dark side power), the majority of the Senate cheered him on loudly in approval. The official continuation of the Galactic Republic was the Galactic Empire.

As the Clone Wars entered their final year, Palpatine's once near-unanimous support had begun to falter. As depicted in the Star Wars: Episode III – Revenge of the Sith novelization and deleted scenes from the film itself, a bloc of senators began to emerge, even before the Clone Wars end, who opposed Palpatine's authoritarian rule and resented his treatment of the Jedi and other opponents. This bloc, originally led by influential politicians such as Bail Organa, Mon Mothma, and later by Bail's adopted daughter Princess Leia Organa, eventually became the political voice of the emerging Rebel Alliance. For almost twenty years, the resistance against the Empire was an isolated insurgency, but following the Battle of Scarif, in 1 BBY, tensions had evolved into another Galactic Conventional War.

In mere days, the Imperial Senate was dissolved and replaced with Moffs, which leads to the Battle of Yavin and the First Death Star being destroyed by the Rebel Alliance. This was the first major victory for the rebellion, against the Empire. Before the events leading up to Yavin, the rebels were seen as a mere nuisance. But after the battle, the Empire considered them to be a much more serious threat, to their existence.

=== New Republic ===
Flag of the New Republic (as seen in "The Mandalorian" season 3, 2023)

The New Republic was a restoration of the Galactic Republic after the Galactic Empire was crushed following Palpatine's death. This was during the destruction of the Second Death Star in the Battle of Endor in 4 ABY. The event was near the end of another Galactic Conventional War, known as the Galactic Civil War.

After the fall of the Emperor, remnants of the Empire were ordered to initiate "Operation: Cinder", a contingency plan created by Palpatine to annihilate both its organization, its followers and its enemies as an act of punishment for failing to prevent his demise, including the planets they have controlled. The Rebels however prevented the Empire's self-destruction in the Battle of Jakku, finally ending Palpatine's rule over the galaxy. In the following years, the remnants of the Empire fought each other, as well as being at a Cold Peace and eventually a Cold War with the New Republic.

In 28 ABY, part of the New Republic, concerned about corruption emerging in the Senate and its unwillingness to see the First Order as a major threat, created the Resistance to fight the First Order. The New Republic is first portrayed onscreen in Star Wars: The Force Awakens (2015), where it is depicted as the ruling government of the galaxy and primary target of the First Order, a neo-Imperialist military junta that sought to reclaim the Empire's legacy.

30 years after the events portrayed in Return of the Jedi (1983), the New Republic effectively collapsed when the First Order's planet-converted superweapon, Starkiller Base, destroyed Hosnian Prime and the New Republic fleet and Senate with its phantom energy beam. This started yet another Galactic Conventional War, this time, it was called the First Order-Resistance War. In Star Wars: The Rise of Skywalker (2019), after the Battle of Exegol, Rey, a reformed Ben Solo and the Resistance have successfully put an end to the First Order. Who by then had renamed themselves as the Final Order, along with the Sith Eternal, and the resurrected Palpatine. Therefore, making way for the Republic to be reborn anew.

This ends the Third Galactic War, after over a year, of interstellar conflict. The Battle of Exegol, had also ended a grand total of 54 years of the Empire's existence, 67 years of Palpatine's galactic influence, and 1067 years of the Sith's Grand Plan.

Legends

The successor government to the Empire was explored as early as Marvel Comics' self-titled Star Wars series, which ran until 1986. The New Republic per se debuted in the 1991 Star Wars Legends novel, Heir to the Empire, by author Timothy Zahn.

== Institutions ==
=== Senate, Chancellor and Jedi Order ===
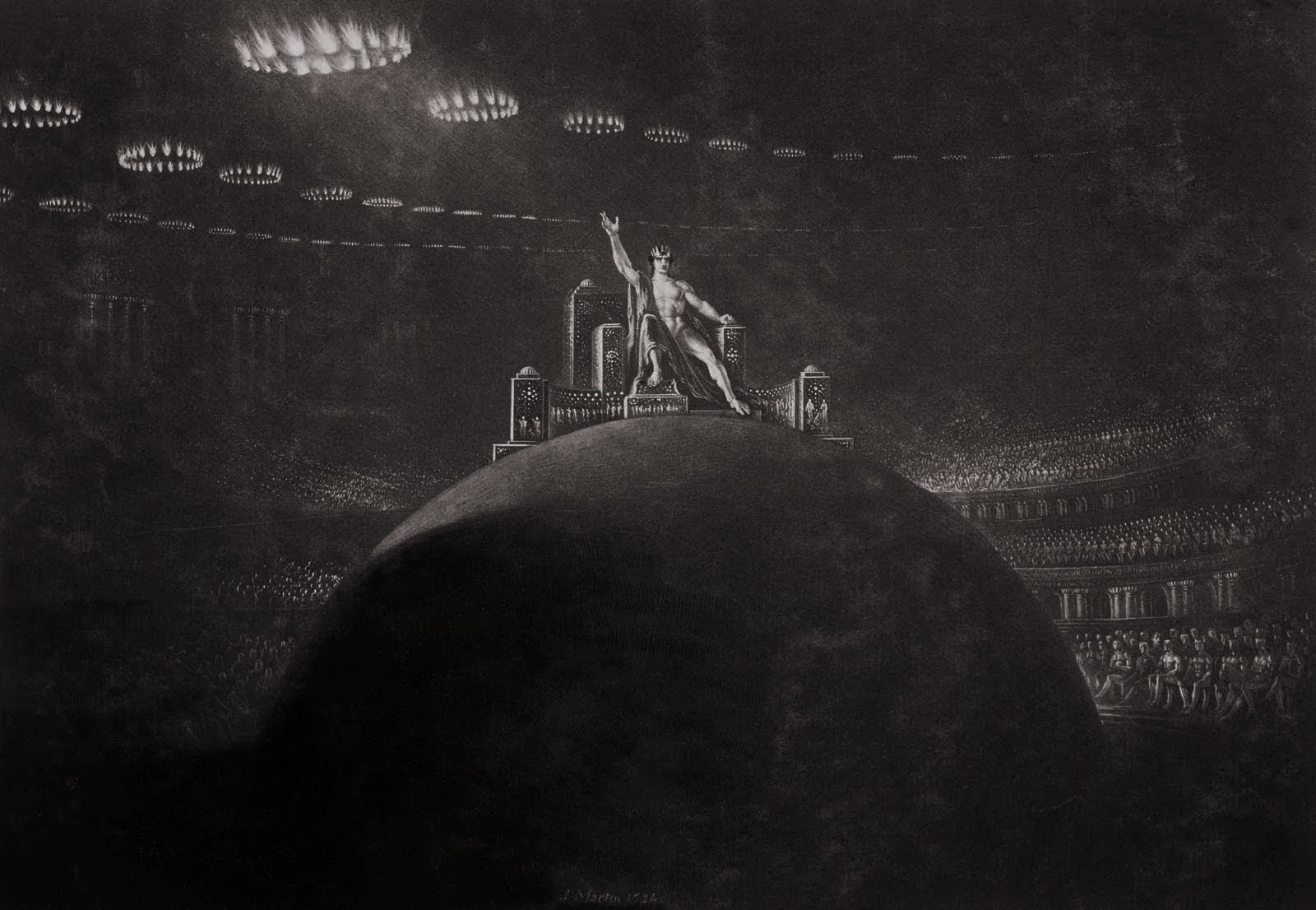
John Martin's c. 1823–1827 engraving, Satan Presiding at the Infernal Council, served as the design of the Galactic Senate in the 1999 film Star Wars: Episode I – The Phantom Menace.

The Republic begins as a mutual protection and economic alliance among a number of planets in the Core. Each member world or system chooses a Senator to represent them in the Galactic Senate, the main body of the legislative branch of the government. Senators are ambassadors of their homeworlds or systems. Member worlds and systems maintain their governments and societies as long as it does not defy any central and core Republican laws. There are a wide variety of different local governments along the political spectrum: from human-like monarchies and republics to alien conglomerates and hive-like communes; libertarians and authoritarians; autocracies, oligarchies and democracies.

When the Republic's power and influence expand, many new areas of the galaxy are incorporated into the Republic. The Core and Colonies are the base of the Galactic Republic. A reorganization of senatorial representation occurs 1,000 years prior to Star Wars during the Ruusan Reformation. The most common organization for these new territories is to group regions into Sectors of about 50 inhabited worlds. Each sector is represented by a Senatorial Delegation. When the number of sectors becomes too large, sectors are organized into roughly a thousand regions, each represented by one delegation to the Senate.

The Senate serves as the unicameral main body of the legislative branch, but has immense power over the entire Galactic Republic. The capital of the Republic, which contains the most political power and wealth, is Coruscant.

Inside the Senate Building, there is an area in which the Senate debates, casts votes, and makes or passes bills. It contains 1,024 floating platforms, each of which contain a senator and his or her aides. Each platform in the senate represents a "sector" of the galaxy. A few platforms represent individual worlds of high importance, or worlds bringing special pleas to the Senate. Some represent special interest groups such as the Trade Federation, and other companies, corporations, and industries. Each senatorial delegation has one vote.

The members of the Senate elect a Supreme Chancellor from among their ranks who serves as the Senate's presiding officer and as the Republic's de facto leader. The Chancellor is assisted by the Vice Chair, who is presumably elected in the same manner as the Chancellor; the same Vice Chair is present throughout the entire prequel trilogy. The Senate follows pseudo-parliamentary rules. Supreme Chancellor Finis Valorum was forced out of office by the Senate in a motion of no confidence, introduced by Queen Padmé Amidala of Naboo, for example.

Senators receive one vote in all matters, procedural and substantive. The Chancellor is elected from within the Senate for a set term. The Senate gives the Chancellor emergency powers in times of crisis and removes them from office when necessary. The assembly is in turn divided into individual committees, each specializing in specific fields of government administration, and which were responsible for creating legislation to be reviewed by the full assembly. The Senate has some form of judicial power as well, although the Republic has a judicial branch, in which the Supreme Court was the main body.

The main functions of the Senate are to mediate disputes between members, provide for the common defense, create and pass laws into effect that would benefit most of the Republic, and regulate inter-system trade. The Jedi Order, although technically not officially part of the Republic, are considered the defenders of the general Republic. The Republic often orders the Jedi to specific areas that require assistance. In this way, they are eventually the unofficial police force of the Republic. They become representatives of the Senate as well, to some extent.

Despite the seemingly organized structure of the Republic, the waning years of the Republic are a time of corruption and great social injustice. The Senate becomes divided between those who genuinely wish to uphold the values and ideals of the Republic and those who wish to further their own goals. Following a series of weak and ineffectual Chancellors, there is a crisis involving the invasion of Naboo by the Trade Federation over a tariff passed by the Senate.

After Senator Palpatine of Naboo becomes Chancellor, he increases the power of the office, from acting as commander-in-chief of the Grand Army of the Republic, or the Republic Military to the institution of his personal bodyguard organization, the Red Guard. The Office of the Supreme Chancellor is given power equaling that of the Senate. The Galactic Senate also meets less often, as the Chancellor is voted more emergency powers to act on his own during the time of crisis.

Eventually, many Outer Rim planets and companies leave the Republic due to the amount of corruption and unfair treatment to Outer Rim worlds. Together, they form a secessionist movement known as the Confederacy of Independent Systems, almost exclusively referred to in the films as the Separatists. Some large industrial companies, including the Trade Federation, side with the Separatists, providing them with their military and its resources.

=== Galactic politicians ===
Politicians include Senators, the Supreme Chancellor, the Vice Chair of the Senate, the Administrative Aide, various Representatives from systems, and to an unofficial extent, the members of the Jedi Council. Jedi Council members hold special status as they appear to have the ability to watch Senate meetings and advise such Senators on various matters. The Jedi order protects these people.

=== Military ===
While the Old Republic had an Army and Navy for thousands of years, after the Ruusan Reformations, the High Republic does not maintain a professional military except for a small token force known as the Judicial Forces, responsible for safeguarding Coruscanti space. Every High Republic member world were responsible for their own security; wealthy metropolitan planets were headquarters of law enforcement academies, private security firms and defense contractors; while impoverished border worlds relied on marshals, freelanced bounty hunters and mercenaries for justice and protection, respectively.

=== Palpatine and the Jedi ===
The Jedi with the most authority served on the Jedi High Council, among whom Yoda and Mace Windu act as de facto leaders at the height of the Republic. Although the Senate holds some degree of political authority over the Jedi, very little pressure was ever put on the council before Palpatine took office and demanded that Anakin Skywalker become a member of the Council in Star Wars: Episode III - Revenge of the Sith, despite the misgivings of the Jedi. While the Jedi Council allowed Anakin to sit among them, they did not grant him the rank of Master.

== Reception and analysis ==
The story of the Galactic Republic's rise, fall and resurrection have been compared to those of the real-world Roman Republic and Weimar Germany. The story of its "fall and redemption" has also been compared to that of Anakin Skywalker.

Brake and Chase (2016) compared the hypothesized colonization of the Core Worlds by Coruscanti humans to the state of the space colonisation by humans from the Earth, which had taken its first step with NASA's Apollo program of 1961–1972, just before George Lucas invented Star Wars. They argued that Lucas offered a solution to the Fermi paradox: indeed, most of the Star Wars galaxy was conquered/colonized and submitted to the central government of the Republic rather quickly by the expansionist humans from the Core Worlds soon after they acquired the necessary rocket technology for interstellar travel, but there are still large uncharted Unknown Regions which are simply too far from the fashionable Core Worlds to have been fully explored (as exploration of the Unknown Regions is lethally dangerous), let alone colonized. Thus, it's possible that the Solar System is also situated "in the Milky Way's version of the Unknown Regions", and that even if there are other species in the Milky Way, which may even have established a Star Wars-like Galactic Republic or Empire, the Earth and its human civilization have so far been in uncharted and dangerous hyperspace-travel territory (from that galactic civilization's point of view), and humans themselves are still too technologically limited to make contact with it.

Silvio (2007) posits that Star Wars films should be understood as being heavily influenced by the time in which they were created. The prequel trilogy where the Galactic Republic was first depicted was influenced by the presidency of George W. Bush, including the war on terror, the Iraq War, and the increased U.S. security apparatus with the Patriot Act. Anakin Skywalker's line "If you're not with me, then you're my enemy" is an echo of Bush's war on terror dichotomy that "Either you are with us, or you are with the terrorists." George Lucas even confirmed that Padmé Amidala's line "So this is how liberty dies... with thunderous applause" invokes the Bush administration's passing of the Patriot Act and Wars in Iraq and Afghanistan without public scrutiny.

== Appearances in the chronological order ==
- Star Wars: Young Jedi Adventures (2023–2025)
- The Acolyte (2024)
- Tales of the Jedi (2022)
- Star Wars: The Phantom Menace (1999) (First appearance)
- Star Wars: Attack of the Clones (2002)
- Star Wars: The Clone Wars (2008 animated film)
- Star Wars: The Clone Wars (2008–2020)
- Star Wars: Revenge of the Sith (2005)
- Star Wars: The Bad Batch (2021−2024) (Briefly)
- Star Wars: Maul – Shadow Lord (2026–present) (Symbol and mentioned only)
- Andor (2022−2025) (Symbol and mentioned only)
- Star Wars: Rebels (2014–2018) (Symbol and mentioned only)
- Star Wars: A New Hope (1977) (First mentioned)
- Star Wars: The Empire Strikes Back (Mentioned only)
- The Mandalorian (2019–2023) (Mentioned only)
- The Book of Boba Fett (2021–2022) (Mentioned only)
- Ahsoka (2023–present) (Mentioned only)
- Star Wars: The Rise of Skywalker (2019) (Mentioned only)

=== New Republic appearances in the chronological order ===
- Star Wars: Rebels (2014–2018) (Indirect mention earlier)
- Star Wars: Squadrons (2020)
- Star Wars: Battlefront II (2017)
- The Mandalorian (2019–2023)
- The Book of Boba Fett (2021–2022) (Mentioned only)
- Ahsoka (2023–present)
- Star Wars: Skeleton Crew (2024–2025)
- The Mandalorian and Grogu (2026)
- Star Wars Resistance (2018–2020) (Briefly)
- Star Wars: The Force Awakens (2015) (First appearance)
- Star Wars: The Last Jedi (2017) (Mentioned only)

== Literature ==
- Brake, Mark; Chase, Jon (2016). The Science of Star Wars: The Scientific Facts Behind the Force, Space Travel, and More!. New York: Simon and Schuster. ISBN 9781944686291.
- Horton, Cole; Hidalgo, Pablo; Zehr, Dan (2020). The Star Wars Book: Expand Your Knowledge of a Galaxy Far, Far Away. London: Dorling Kindersley. p. 321. ISBN 9780241502211.
