= Technology in Star Wars =

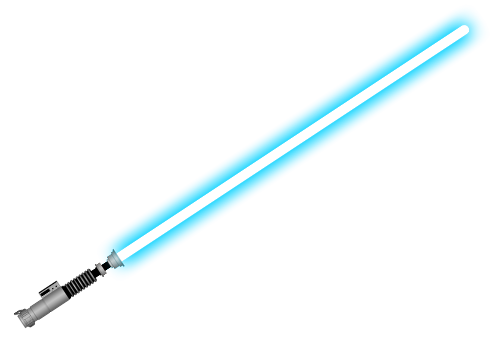
The lightsaber, a fictional energy sword used in the franchise

The space-opera blockbuster franchise Star Wars has borrowed many real-life scientific and technological concepts in its fictional universe. In turn, Star Wars has depicted, inspired, and influenced several futuristic technologies, some of which are in existence and others under development. In the introduction of the Return of the Jedi novelization, George Lucas wrote: "Star Wars is also very much concerned with the tension between humanity and technology, an issue which, for me, dates back even to my first films. In Jedi, the theme remains the same, as the simplest of natural forces brought down the seemingly invincible weapons of the evil Empire."

While many of these technologies are in existence and in use today, they are not nearly as complex as seen in Star Wars. Some of these technologies are not considered possible at present. Nevertheless, many of the technologies depicted by Star Wars parallel modern real-life technologies and concepts, though some have significant differences.

== Biotechnology ==
=== Cloning and genetic engineering ===
Star Wars also depicts the practice of cloning and genetic engineering, though far more advanced and sophisticated than modern scientific and technological standards. Cloning in Star Wars was first mentioned in the original 1977 Star Wars film (A New Hope) and its novelization. It was first seen on film in Star Wars: Episode II – Attack of the Clones (2002).

There are major differences between the current ability to clone humans and those seen in Star Wars. Current human cloning methods need to use the somatic cell nuclear transfer (SCNT), which requires an unfertilized egg from a female donor to have its nucleus removed, resulting in an enucleated egg. DNA from the subject being cloned would need to be extracted and electronically fused together with the enucleated egg. A surrogate mother needs to be impregnated with the embryos to give birth to the clone.

Cloning in Star Wars does not seem to use this process, and instead depicts advanced machinery that directly processes the human subject's DNA, and produces the clone or clones, by the thousands, if desired. The clones in Star Wars can also be genetically altered during their pre-birth phase to have their growth hormones and learning abilities accelerated, as well as their independence and self-consciousness restricted.

According to Jeanne Cavelos, a science-fiction writer and former NASA astrophysicist, who is also author of the book The Science of Star Wars, all of this is a future possibility with the progress of science and technology. What is not possible, according to her, is the ability to accelerate either the growth of clones, or their ability to learn faster.

=== Regeneration ===
Submersion in a liquid called bacta causes mutilated flesh to regenerate in the Star Wars universe. According to an in-universe reference book, bacta is a blue-hued chemical compound; it must be mixed with a synthetic liquid which mimics bodily fluids. The combined bacterial medium regenerates traumatized flesh and promotes tissue growth. Luke Skywalker was first seen using a bacta tank in The Empire Strikes Back; his father Darth Vader has a similar tank in Rogue One. Clone troopers also use such healing technology in The Clone Wars. Bacta can also be administered in a spray form.

=== Prosthetics ===
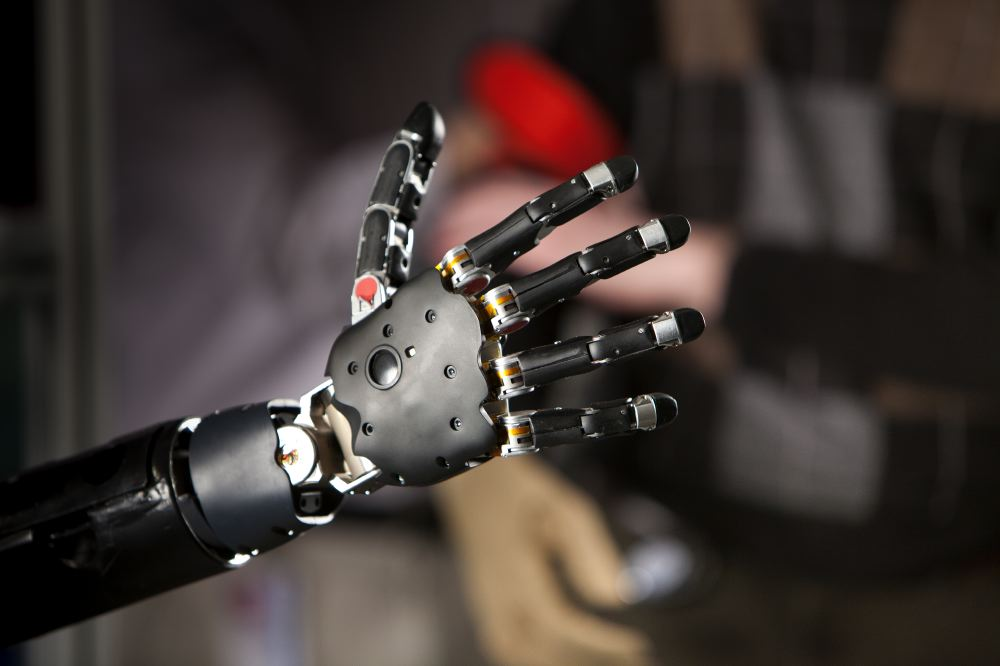
A modern brain-controlled prosthetic hand and arm co-developed by the Applied Physics Laboratory and the Food and Drug Administration

In Star Wars, prosthetics are first seen on film towards the end of Star Wars Episode V: The Empire Strikes Back. The prosthetic limbs seen in the films bear an almost absolute resemblance to natural limbs, in terms of size, shape, and movement. The only distinction is the material that the prosthetic limbs are made of, which differs greatly from the organic material of the natural limbs and other organs that the prosthetic limbs replace. Such precision is not considered possible by current technological means. However, according to recent research and development conducted at the Case Western University, which produced prosthetic limbs similar to the ones seen in Star Wars, the ability for prosthetics to produce feeling has become closer to reality.

A similar production, even closer to natural organic limbs, known as the DEKA Arm System and dubbed "The Luke", after Luke Skywalker's prosthetic arm, was approved for mass production by the US Food and Drug Administration after eight years of testing and development.

More recently, scientists have begun to develop artificial skin jackets to cover prosthetic limbs, creating an effect similar to what is seen in the Star Wars films.

== Body armor ==
Body armor is seen throughout the Star Wars films, television shows and other media. Their main purpose is to protect the wearer from attacks and other hazards as in ancient and current times on Earth. They are most commonly seen on Imperial stormtroopers, clone troopers, bounty hunters and others, providing various levels of protection and other functions. According to Star Wars lore, the armor worn by stormtroopers is generally impervious to projectile weapons and blast shrapnel and can deflect a glancing blow from a blaster but will be punctured by a direct hit. Meanwhile, the traditional armor worn by Mandalorians, made from the fictional material known as beskar, is capable of repelling a lightsaber; though by the time the films take place in, most sets only had small amounts of beskar, which was alloyed with other metals. This was because most of the beskar in Mandalore's crust had mined out millennia prior.

Major characters in the Star Wars franchise are also known for wearing body armor. The bounty hunter Boba Fett wore modified body armor fitted with various gadgets like his predecessor, Jango Fett. This armor has multi-purpose tactical abilities along with many scrapes and dents which Fett wears with pride. Darth Vader wears an armored suit which protects him in combat as well as provides life-support functions for his badly burned body.

Such type of armor has slowly begun to become a scientific reality. In 2016, ballistic and body armor company, AR500, in collaboration with Heckler & Koch produced body armor modelled after the iconic villain, Boba Fett.

== Carbonite freezing ==
Carbonite freezing in Star Wars is first seen in the film The Empire Strikes Back when Darth Vader places Han Solo in a carbonite casing to be delivered to Jabba the Hutt. The reverse process is seen in Return of the Jedi, where he is thawed. The technology also appears in The Mandalorian.

Carbonite freezing is based on the concept of cryonics, which involves freezing a living organism to keep it in suspended animation. The technology is still being researched and developed by scientists into a more sophisticated form. Carbonite exists in real life as a type of gunpowder. According to professor James H. Fallon, the carbonite used in Star Wars might be a "dry ice" with an opposite charge. He further speculates that it is a form of carbon dioxide mineral, which, like in cryonics, is kept at very low temperatures, to the point that there is no need for oxygen or blood-flow. This could keep living organisms and living tissue in suspended animation. While the freezing process as depicted in the films is realistic, reversing the same process by heating, he argues, is more challenging, and can be dangerous if heated too fast. He also argues that this process, as depicted in the film, is a scientific, physical challenge. In 2020, researchers were able to preserve Panagrolaimus superbus nematodes in a suspended animation state known as anhydrobiosis (i.e. while extremely desiccated) inside a liquid metal cage (Gallium, which later solidified) during seven days, and then recovered them alive.

== Computers and other artificial intelligence ==
Aside from droids/robots, the use of artificial intelligence and computers is found very commonly in the Star Wars universe. Computing technology exists in many different forms in both the Star Wars movies and other media, with the capacity to process large volumes of data every millisecond and store it for safekeeping. Examples include simple viewscreens that receive and display information; scanners which examine an object, interpret the collected data and present it to the user; and data-pads, portable computers (often handheld) which allow individuals to access and interpret information.

An example of computing devices which perform very complex tasks in the Star Wars franchise are navigational computers, also called nav-computers or navi-computers, which form a key part of many Star Wars spacecraft. Such computers are said to store vast libraries of astrogation knowledge and work with their ships' sensors and hyperdrive to plot safe courses in real-space and hyperspace. Source material makes it clear that only the desperate or foolhardy would attempt traveling in hyperspace without an up-to-date navi-computer as a ship can easily smash into a hazard without one. Some small Star Wars spacecraft (such as the X-wing) use an astromech droid in place of a navi-computer due to size restrictions.

A unique form of data storage found in the Star Wars universe is the Holocron, a type of artefact used by both Jedi and Sith to store vital and sensitive knowledge, usually concerning the Force. Holocrons resemble evenly-proportioned polyhedra and typically store information in the form of holographic lessons. Many will only permit access to someone who is sensitive in the Force, and for additional security may require a separate memory crystal in order to activate. More mundane forms of data storage exist in the Star Wars franchise, though some have tremendous capacity. The IGV-55 Surveillance Vessel, a class of Imperial spy ship seen in the Star Wars Rebels television series, possess a massive database that can store billions of yottabytes of data.

In a 2016 article for TechCrunch, contributor Evaldo H. de Oliveira estimated the amount of data needed to manage the Death Star was in excess of 40,000 yottabytes. This included an estimate that the Death Star's crew would generate 8.84 exabytes per year, with an additional 2.08 exabytes generated per year by its droid population.

An example of multi-purpose artificial intelligence is seen in moisture vaporators, devices that produce water from hydrogen and oxygen in the air. These are first seen on film on the planet Tatooine in A New Hope. Their artificial intelligence is more basic than most other forms of artificial intelligence seen in the Star Wars universe, dealing with input from humidity and air density sensors. They use this input to help them take samples from the air and produce water. They also require input from robots. The film also shows Owen Lars, Luke's uncle, telling C-3PO that he needs a droid that can really understand the language of moisture vaporators, with the droid claiming that it is in his programming.

Cybersecurity also plays a major role in the films and other media, with many real-world counterparts. The term slicer is the in-universe designation for a hacker in the Star Wars universe, describing individuals such as DJ (Benicio del Toro) from The Last Jedi. A form of security token is worn by Imperial and First Order officers called a code or access cylinder, which grants them access to restricted areas or databases.

A report analysing the Empire's cyber-security systems used in Rogue One, in which IT experts were consulted, made a few conclusions. One claim by information systems management professor Hsinchun Chen was that the theft of digital architectural designs are a common phenomenon in real life. He concludes that software breaches should not just be resisted, as in the case of Star Wars, but successfully prevented by taking security measures far prior to any attempted attacks. Corey Nachreiner, in a 2017 GeekWire article, also examined some of the lessons in cyber-security offered by Rogue One. This include the need to safeguard the Internet of Things represented by the droid character K-2SO (Alan Tudyk) and the need for strong multi-factor authentication.

== Cybernetics ==
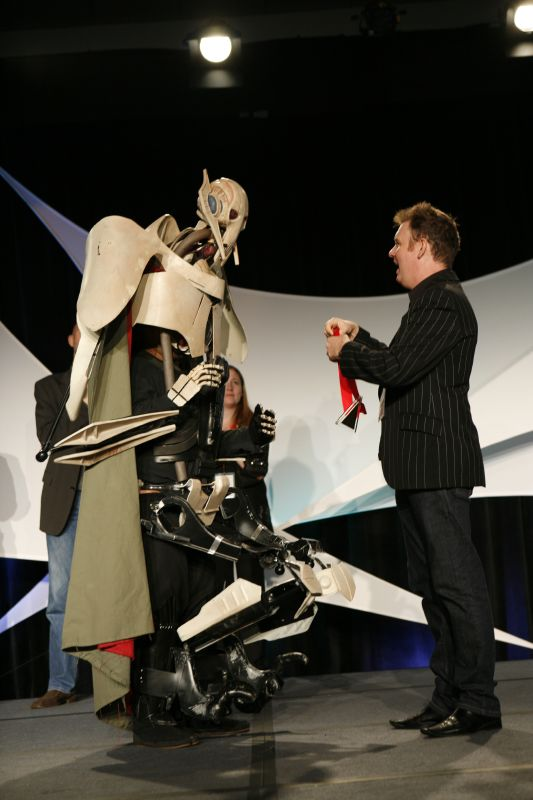
A fan-made replica costume of General Grievous, whose entire body is mechanical

The use of cybernetics in Star Wars is documented by much of the Star Wars media, including novels, comics, and television series. It is used by characters for both enhancements and replacements for damaged or destroyed body parts. Within the Star Wars universe, characters who uses cybernetics to enhance their bodies are referred to as cyborgs. Cybernetics are used to replace organic body parts at a deeper and more complex level than prosthetics, and the process is usually irreversible. In the films, it is most recognizably used on two major characters: General Grievous and Darth Vader, both whom are cyborgs. Its applications are also first seen on film in Star Wars: Episode III – Revenge of the Sith.

Darth Vader, previously Anakin Skywalker, lost one of his limbs starting in the Clone Wars, and later, towards the end of the Clone Wars, lost most of his limbs after a deadly lightsaber duel with Obi-Wan Kenobi. Shortly after the duel, he was caught in the heat range of molten lava, resulting in the burning and melting of much of his flesh and tissue.

Vader lost many of his nervous and sensory systems, most of which were replaced by prosthetics, bionics, and, later, cybernetics. Besides having cybernetic limbs, Vader wore a suit equipped with cybernetic systems, both to help him function, and to protect his damaged body from exposure. His belt included high and low range audio sensors. The belt also included respiratory and temperature regulation adjustment controls. Vader's neural functions were also regulated by neuro sensors, located towards the back of his helmet. Additionally, to help him see, breathe, and maintain cognition, Vader's helmet was equipped with enhanced visual sensors, body heat vents, and neural function sensors.

Vader's internal oxygen, blood, and nutrient flows, as well as nervous systems, were regulated by the control plate on his chest. His muscular system was enhanced by a neuro-electrical nervous pulse system in his cybernetic suit, giving him amplified physical strength. Scientists and scientific commentators have suggested that Vader lost his lungs by inhaling air in extreme temperatures within the heat range of lava on the planet Mustafar, causing damage to his lung tissue. This would require the need for a filter mask to take in more purified oxygen, as well as replacement lungs, most of which are possible by modern scientific and technological means.

A peer reviewed journal by two Danish physicians concluded that Darth Vader's suit acts as a wearable hyperbaric chamber, which supports his supposedly chronically injured lungs. It also protects his damaged and vulnerable skin from infection. In a study on the breakdown of Vader's breathing habits, one of the two physicians concluded that the suit would not be their top preference, but rather that lung transplantation would be a better choice.

General Grievous's body is almost entirely cybernetic. Animation director Rob Coleman explained that Grievous was made with technological flaws, and experienced difficulties such as poor manoeuvrability and coughing, the latter caused by his lungs constantly filling with liquid. His mechanical body did, however, give him advantages in combat, due to being made of solid material, instead of organic bones and limbs.

Grievous's organic body being destroyed in conflict left him with only a brain, eyes, and internal organs, which scientists placed in a constructed cybernetic body. Anatomy and neurobiology professor James H. Fallon of the University of California explains that one problem with this type of cybernetic body is the lack of knowledge in brain circuitry coding, which has yet to be decrypted. Fallon argues that most prosthetic and cybernetic technology in Star Wars is still plausible with continuous research and development in the relevant fields.

Many other minor characters and organizations within the Star Wars universe are known to utilize cybernetics. Lobot, the chief administrative aide of Bespin's Cloud City, is fitted with an AJ^6 cyborg construct. While it allows direct neural interface with computer systems via wireless signal and overall productivity increase, the implant tends to negatively affect the user's personality in what is referred to as the "lobotomy effect." Imperial Death Troopers are fitted with implants which provide biofeedback information and can stimulate sensory organs for increased performance. Foot soldiers of the Guavian Death Gang, first appearing in The Force Awakens, receive cybernetic augmentations in exchange for their loyalty, including a second mechanical heart which pumps speed- and aggression-enhancing chemicals directly into the bloodstream.

== Energy technology ==
The Imperial TIE Fighter (artist's render on the left) using the same concept of solar-based energy for ion propulsion as NASA craft Deep Space 1 (right) by the use of solar panels

Reference material identifies a number of different methods by which energy is created in the Star Wars universe. Examples of power sources used for domestic devices include chemical, fission and fusion reactors. In Star Wars spacecraft and other large structures, fusion reactors powered by the fictional "hypermatter" fuel are considered the most common source of energy. These fuels are typically hazardous to organic life, taking the form of corrosive liquids or poisonous gases.

Solar power technology is a method of energy generation used mainly by the Imperial TIE fighter, which features in many Star Wars films and other media. According to the TIE Fighter Owner's Workshop Manual, these spacecraft are fitted with two hexagonal wings that have six trapezoidal solar arrays on both sides which collect energy from nearby stars and use it to power the fighter's ion engines. Another Star Wars ship noted for using solar power is the solar sailer piloted by Count Dooku (Christoper Lee) in Attack of the Clones and other media. It deploys a solar sail 100 m (330 ft) wide which captures interstellar energy in order to travel without requiring fuel.

An electron transfer experiment conducted by scientists in 2005 involved a supramolecular TIE fighter ship design. It is unclear whether the experiment managed to achieve the desired results or not.

== Force fields ==
External videos
- Shields Up! The Physics of Star Wars Leicester University

The use of force fields in the Star Wars universe is documented both in the main films of the Star Wars saga and in spin-off media, such as The Clone Wars, as well as other media adaptations. According to reference material, protective force fields used to defend starships, buildings, armies and other objects from attack are known as deflector shields and come in two main types. Particle shields repel solid objects such as space debris or high-velocity projectiles. Ray shields (or energy shields) repel radiation, lasers, blasters and other energy-based attacks. Deflector shields which envelop an object can either be generated by it or be projected onto it from another location.

Deflector fields come in many different sizes and varieties in the Star Wars universe, as seen in the films and explained in background literature. Droidekas, which made their theatrical appearance in The Phantom Menace, are equipped with deflector shields that are polarized to allow their own blaster bolts to pass through while stopping any fire coming from outside. In The Empire Strikes Back a shield system protects the Rebels' Echo Base on Hoth. Projected by modules studded throughout the surrounding territory and powered by a central generator, only slow-moving ground-contact vehicles (such as Walkers) can penetrate the shield. The incomplete Death Star II is protected remotely via deflector shield generator located on the Endor in Return of the Jedi. Identified as a SLD-26 Planetary Shield Generator, it can envelop a small moon (or large space station) with a nearly impenetrable shield for an indefinite period of time. In Rogue One: A Star Wars Story, the tropical planet Scarif is completely enveloped in a deflector shield to prevent anyone from landing or leaving the planet without Imperial authorization except by a single shield gate.

Many Star Wars spacecraft and starfighters are said to possess generators which create both types of deflector shields around them to protect against normal space travel and enemy attacks. Smaller vessels may only have a single deflector shield generator which can be adjusted to protect specific parts of the ship, while larger vessels may have multiple generators each protecting a specific area. Large starships with hangar bays will also employ another type of force field called a magnetic shield. These are activated whenever the hangar's blast doors are opened, retaining a pressurized atmosphere within the bay while allowing smaller vessels to come and go.

The Gungans are described in Star Wars sources employing unique hydrostatic field generators to create their underwater bubble cities as seen in The Phantom Menace. This same technology is used to make defensive shields for their army, from small handheld versions that can deflect solid objects and blasters to large generators carried on fictional Fambaa creatures. These generators can envelop an area as wide as one kilometre in a protective bubble which will stop weapons fire but not battle droids from marching through the perimeter.

In 2014, physics students at the University of Leicester developed a module of plasma-based deflector shields, inspired by the ones in Star Wars and other science fiction stories. However, the field poses some issues. One issue is that the deflector shield would have to be much stronger to repel than to hold the plasma in position. Another is that the shield would deflect electromagnetic energy, including light. This would make it impossible for someone inside the shield to see anything.

In 2015, the American company Boeing built plasma-based force fields, similar in size and dimensions to the force fields used in Star Wars ground battles. Like the ground force fields in the Star Wars films, these shields cannot block or repel solid matter, but are instead built to protect vehicles from the force of explosions.

== Gravity technology ==
Technology which allows for the manipulation of gravity is a common feature in the Star Wars films and other media. Examples include the use of tractor beams, force fields which envelop an object and manipulate it remotely, and repulsorlifts, which push against a planet's gravity to create lift. Artificial gravity and inertial dampeners are also used on Star Wars spacecraft, protecting their occupants from the crushing gravitational forces of high-speed manoeuvres or when landing on a high-gravity world. Interdiction fields create gravitational shadows which prevent Star Wars ships from using their hyperdrives or pull them out of hyperspace.

=== Repulsorlift ===
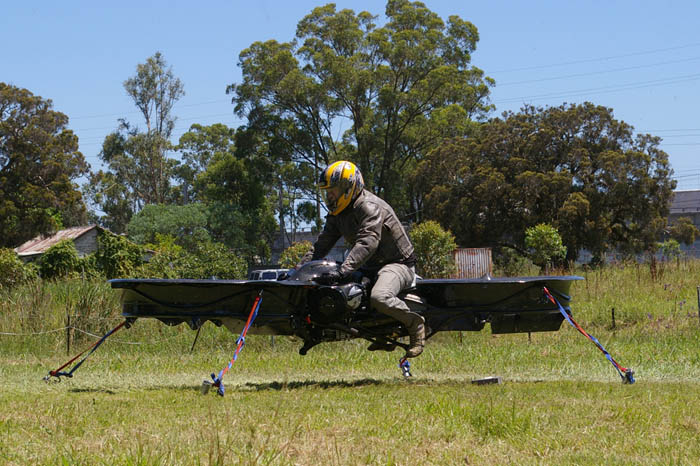
Although the Malloy hoverbike may appear very similar to a Star Wars hoverbike in terms of size, shape and performance, its input and levitation is by air propulsion with the use of turbofans as opposed to a Star Wars hoverbike which uses anti-gravity "repulsorlift" engines.

Levitation is depicted throughout the Star Wars films, as well as in most other spin-off media of the franchise. Levitation in Star Wars is primarily caused by a type of anti-gravity technology known within the setting as a "repulsorlift engine." According to in-universe material, a fusion-powered repulsorlift or 'antigrav' creates a field of negative gravity that pushes against the natural gravitational field of a planet. Terrestrial vehicles such as landspeeders and speeder bikes use this technology to propel themselves across a planet's surface. Repulsorlifts are also used by spacecraft as secondary engines for atmospheric flight and planetary landings and take-offs.

Other vehicles that utilize repulsorlift engines include Jabba the Hutt's sail barge and snowspeeders. Many droids and robots also use this technology to hover and move above a planet's surface, such as the Imperial Probe Droid. The carbonite freezing coffin that kept Han Solo in suspension was suspended in mid-air using a gravity repulsion force field.

Levitation by this method is currently considered a physical impossibility by today's means. Despite being a current scientific impossibility, research on such concepts are still being hypothesized and exercised by scientists today, with occasional minor breakthroughs.

Magnetic levitation already exists in modern times, but with fundamental differences from levitation seen in Star Wars. An example of vehicles that maintain constant levitation without the use of constant propulsion is the Maglev train. The Maglev train stays afloat by using the magnetic repulsion of like charges, but relies on the surface that it travels above— in its case, the train tracks— to have the same charge as its own coils, resulting in a magnetic repulsion.

One possibility for magnetic levitation as seen in Star Wars is suggested by physics associate professor Michael Dennin. According to him, if a planet were made out of the right magnetic materials, such as iron or nickel, the vehicle could then produce a repulsive charge, allowing it to lift above the surface.

In 2010, Australian inventor and engineer Chris Malloy constructed a hoverbike that uses turbofans to enter flight. It is claimed to fly up to 10,000 feet (3,050 m) and fly at a horizontal speed of 173 miles per hour (278 km/h). The hoverbike has been repeatedly compared to the hoverbikes seen in the Star Wars films. It is unclear, however, whether these hoverbikes were actually inspired by Star Wars or not. Another fundamental difference, besides their power sources, is that the hoverbikes in Star Wars can only climb a few meters above the ground, unlike the current ones being developed. Malloy's company, Malloy Aeronautics, is reported to have partnered with an American-based company for further experimenting, as well as developing Malloy's hoverbikes for the US military.

=== Tractor beams ===
A tractor beam is described as an invisible force field that can grab, trap, suspend, and move objects with force. According to Star Wars sources, tractor beams generators and projectors are common components on many spacecraft, with both military and civilian applications. Tractor beams can be used to move cargo, tow disabled vessels, or assist in docking manoeuvres. They can also be used offensively to slow down or immobilize an opponent, though targeting fast and manoeuvrable ships can be challenging. Additional uses are made of this technology for other purposes as well. Open-topped taxis on Coruscant emit tractor fields when in flight to keep passengers securely seated without requiring restraints. The AT-TE possess tractor-field generators in its footpads for a stronger grip over uneven ground. The Starhawk-class battleships had tractor beam generators that doubled as weapons powerful enough to tear the hull off starships.

Scientists have explored the concept of tractor beams, having some success since the early 2010s. In that time, they have managed to produce lasers with unusual intensity-beam profiles that allow them to attract and repel tiny particles. Some breakthroughs include the successful project of a team of science researchers from the Australian National University, who managed to produce a doughnut shaped laser that can drag hollow glass spheres by a distance of roughly 7.8 inches, several times the distance of previous experiments.

Another successful experiment was conducted at the University of Bristol, which revealed that sound could be manipulated to produce possible future tractor beams, rivalling light. This could be done using a precisely timed sequence of sound waves, produced by tiny loudspeakers, creating a limited space with low pressure that can counteract gravity and levitate objects.

== Holography ==
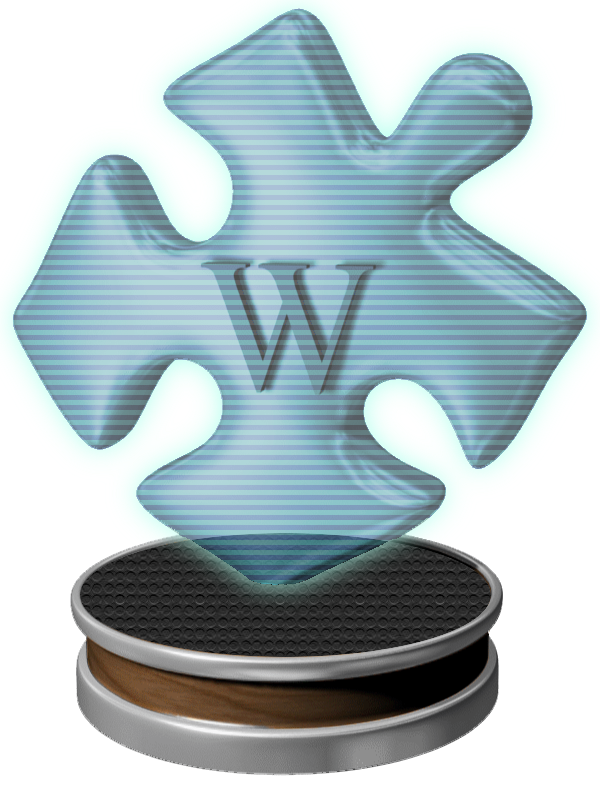
A 3D graphic illustration of a Star Wars style hologram

Holography in Star Wars was first seen on film in the fourth film of the saga Episode IV: A New Hope. Holographs were used for various purposes, mainly communication. At the time of the release of the original Star Wars films, holographic technology in 3D format, as seen in the films, was not available.

Neowin reports that research conducted by Microsoft has brought about the creation of 3D holographic technology. The technology is intended be used for various purposes, such as plotting data on maps.

ExtremeTech reports that smartphones created at HP labs are now bringing 3D holographic technology from Star Wars closer to reality.

Also, Fox News reported that Australian National University students were close to developing Star Wars-style holograms. A researcher for the project said that the material the device consists of will be transparent and used in a wide range of applications, as well as “complex manipulations with light.”.

== Interstellar travel ==
In the Star Wars universe, two different types of fictional propulsion exist to allow starships to travel in space and across the galaxy: sublight drives and hyperdrives. Sublight drives propel starships below the speed of light and are used upon leaving a planet's atmosphere and during space battles. Many different varieties of sublight drives or sublight engines exist, but the most common are electromagnetic propulsion types like ion engines which release charged particles to propel the ship forward. Ion engines also lack moving parts and high-temperature components, making them easier to maintain. Sublight drives can propel Star Wars vessels clear of a planet's atmosphere and gravity in a matter of minutes.

The hyperdrive allows Star Wars spaceships to travel between stars by transporting them into another dimension, known as hyperspace, in which objects with mass are capable of traveling faster than the speed of light. The in-universe explanation for how hyperdrives function is that they utilize supralight 'hypermatter' particles (such as coaxium) to launch ships into hyperspace at faster-than-light speeds without changing their complex mass/energy configuration. Hyperdrives are categorized by class, with the lower class indicating higher speed. Hyperspace is one of two dimensions of space-time. It is coterminous with 'realspace' and permeated by "shadow" counterparts of realspace objects. Any object in hyperspace colliding with one of these shadows is destroyed, so in order to navigate safely, starships must utilize navigational computers (or navi-computers) to calculate a safe route through hyperspace. Thanks to hyperdrive technology, Star Wars ships can cover interstellar distances which would normally require thousands of years in a matter of hours.

Deep Space 1 was the first NASA spacecraft to use ion propulsions, with comparisons made directly between it and the Empire's TIE Fighter. According to NASA, while their means of propulsion were the same, advances in power generation would be needed in order to develop an ion engine as powerful as those used on TIE fighters. The space probe Dawn also uses ion propulsion, although unlike the TIE fighter it was fitted with three instead of just two.

In an examination of the amount of force generated by Star Wars sublight engines, Rhett Allain, associate professor of physics at Southeastern Louisiana University, looked at the scene of a Hammerhead corvette ramming one Imperial Star Destroyer into another during the final space battle of Rogue One: A Star Wars Story. He argues that the Hammerhead's engines would have to have exerted 2×10^{11} (or 200 billion) Newtons in order to push the Star Destroyer. This would make them 6,000 times more powerful than a Saturn V rocket.

== Radios and other communications devices ==
In Star Wars, a subspace transceiver, also known as a subspace comm, subspace radio, and hyper-transceiver, was a standard device used for instantaneous, faster-than-light communications between nearby systems. Similar to its shorter-ranged cousin, the com-link, the subspace transceiver relied on energy to broadcast signals. Starships carried these units to broadcast distress signals and other important messages. They used subspace as the communications medium. The subspace transceiver of an Imperial Star Destroyer had a range of 100 light-years.

Devices for shorter-range communications, such as the com-link, can be either hand-held (as seen in A New Hope) or strapped to the wrist (as seen in The Empire Strikes Back, during the early scenes on the planet Hoth). These devices can also be tuned with encryption algorithms for private communication.

Most humanoid droids, such as C-3PO, communicate long distances using these com-links. Other droids, such as R2-D2 and Imperial Probe Droids, use antennas to transmit/receive messages and signals for longer range communications.

Devices for long-range communications within a planet are connected by satellites orbiting the planet.

== Robotics ==
Star Wars depicts robotics which resembles current robotics technology, though at a much more advanced and developed level. Robotics in Star Wars are generally divided into two categories, as in modern reality: military and civil.

=== Civil ===
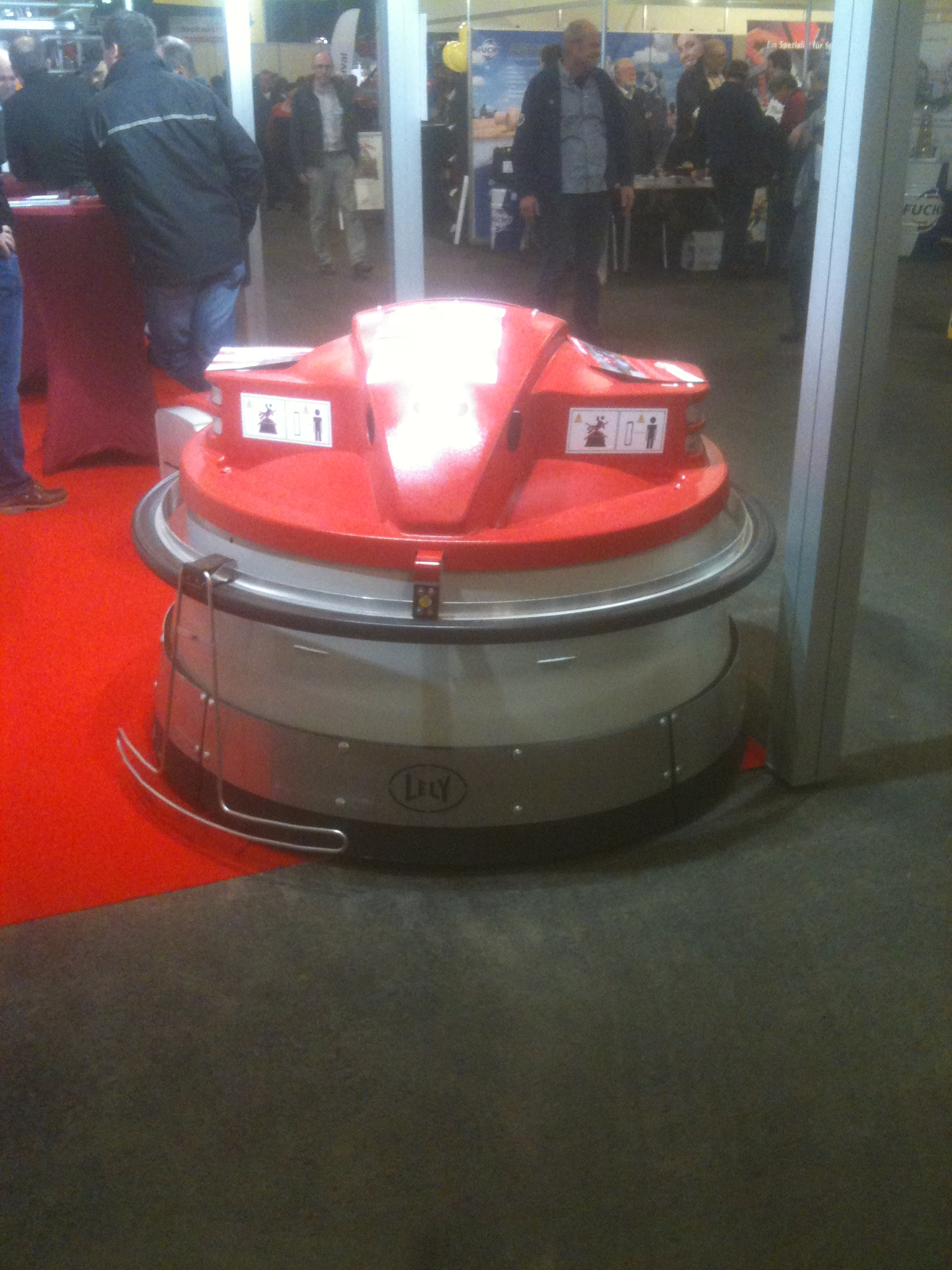
Agricultural barrel-shaped robots such as the Greenlive Lely Juno play important roles in assisting humans with labour chores (in this case farming) similar to the civilian robots seen in Star Wars.

Some robots in the Star Wars universe are capable of performing multiple types of tasks, while others can only perform one type of task. For example, 21-B is built for the sole purpose of performing medical tasks. Others, such as humanoid protocol droids like C-3PO, are built for multiple purposes. These range from basic physical chores to translating between different forms of communication, including with sophisticated computers and other forms of artificial intelligence. Other, barrel-shaped robots, such as R2-D2, are built with multiple features and capabilities. These include repairing and programming advanced devices, as well as maintaining them.

The basic concepts and purposes for robotics in Star Wars, as in real life, are to reduce human labour, assist humans with sophisticated requirements, as well as store and manage complex information. Another parallel to the modern world is the use of robots in Star Wars for tasks not considered safe or acceptable for humans. Robots are also seen as a source of cutting human labour costs.

The Japanese radio control manufacturer Nikko developed a toy robot version of R2-D2, with more limited abilities than the R2-D2 has in the Star Wars films. The toy can respond to a small number of verbal commands. Most of the robot's operations must be done manually, due to its limited abilities. A related development is the creation of the droid BB-8 for the film Star Wars Episode VII: The Force Awakens (made by different manufacturers). In the film, BB-8 is a semi-automated robot, operated by remote control, unlike C-3PO (played by Anthony Daniels) and R2-D2 (played by Kenny Baker), who were portrayed by actual actors. The BB-8 toy is operated by remote control, but it also has some independent features, and shares its manner of movement and other features with the film's BB-8.

In 2010, NASA developed robots inspired by the hovering remote-controlled droids, seen in the Star Wars films and other media, and used by the Jedi for lightsaber combat training. These robots were used in NASA space stations for experimentation. Also in 2010, a hacker developed similar robots, but only capable of floating beyond a limited magnetic range.

=== Military ===
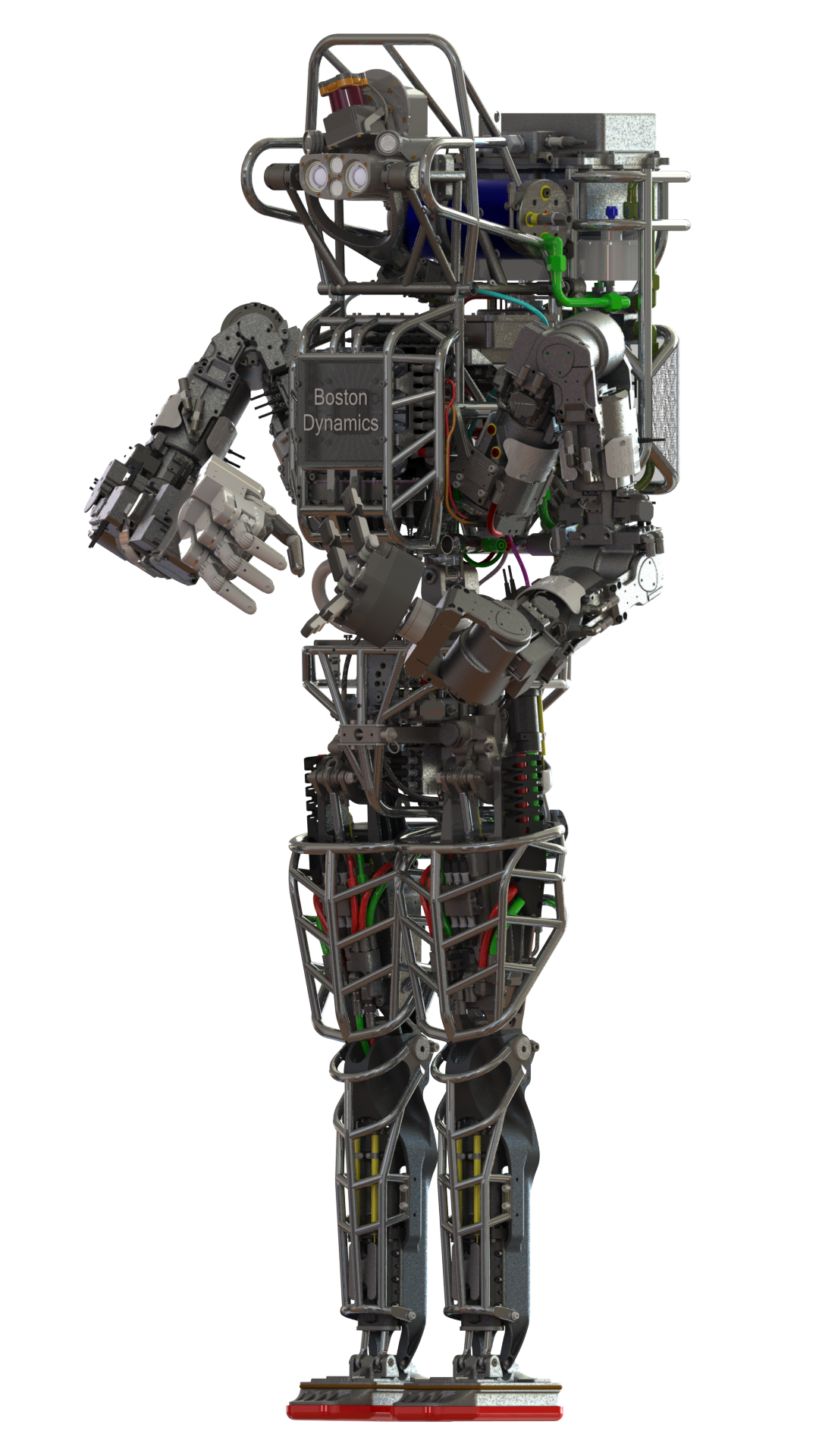
Front view illustration of an Atlas robot developed by Boston Dynamics (now owned by Google) in co-operation with an agency of the United States Department of Defense

Military robots in the Star Wars universe are built on the same principles as modern military robotics. While most military robots in the modern world are designed in various shapes, depending on their purpose, the military robots of the Star Wars universe are primarily humanoid, and built to imitate live, organic soldiers, mainly human ones.

A major similarity between modern military robotics and those of the Star Wars universe is that different robots are built and designed for different specific purposes, whether those purposes are ground warfare, maritime warfare, aerial warfare, or space warfare, as seen in the Star Wars prequel films. Such uses are considered unpractical and unfeasible by current means, given the sophistication and resources each individual unit would require.

Another significant, recognizable distinction of the robots in the Star Wars universe, whether military or civilian, is their strong sense of independence and self-awareness, compared to current robots. This is mainly due to Star Wars robots having much more advanced sensors and self-computing systems than current robots do. Despite the limited abilities of current robots, Dr. Jonathan Roberts, director of CSTRO Autonomous Systems Laboratory, proclaims that the role of robots in assisting humans is going to increase, similarly to what is seen in Star Wars.

The Christian Science Monitor reported in 2011 that an American blogger, out of patriotism, tried to raise money to build a robotic AT-AT for the US military. Heikko Hoffman, a robotics expert from HRL Laboratories, who was not associated with the project, claims that AT-ATs are possible, though some of their designs should be changed from those seen in the Star Wars universe, for safety, and for financial and operational costs. The project, though not terminated, was suspended, due to intellectual property concerns from Lucasfilm.

In 2012, the United States Navy built a robot modelled after C-3PO, but appears to function for both military and civilian purposes.

== Macro-engineering ==
Examples of Macro-engineering on vast scales feature prominently in the Star Wars films and other media. The most famous example is the Death Star from the original Star Wars film. A giant battle station which is said to be 160 km (99 mi) in diameter, it was built in secret over a twenty-year period and operated with a crew of over one million. The Death Star II which appears in Return of the Jedi is even larger at 200 km (120 mi) in diameter. In The Force Awakens, the First Order unveils Starkiller Base, a planetoid 660 km (410 mi) in diameter which has been transformed into a mobile weapons platform. The flagship of the First Order that appears in The Last Jedi, the Supremacy, is a Mega-class Star Destroyer 60 km (37 mi) wide and a crew of over two million.

As part of a team project, a group of students at Lehigh University in 2012 attempted to determine the cost and time needed to build a Death Star. They determined that the amount of steel alone needed to build a Death Star was 1.08×10^{15} (or 1.08 quadrillion) tons, which at then-current production rates would take 833,315 years and cost $852 quadrillion USD. They also estimated that the total amount of mineable iron ore in the Earth would be enough to build two billion Death Stars. Zachary Feinstein, an assistant professor at the McKelvey School of Engineering at Washington University in St. Louis, estimated that the total cost for the first Death Star would amount to $193 quintillion USD. Conversely, he estimated that the cost of building Starkiller Base would be a fraction of that price at $9.315 quintillion USD, but only if it was naturally able to maintain a self-sustaining atmosphere.

== Other technologies ==
Aside from major technologies, the Star Wars universe also includes technologies that play less important roles with respect to the plot of the stories.

=== Optical Instruments ===
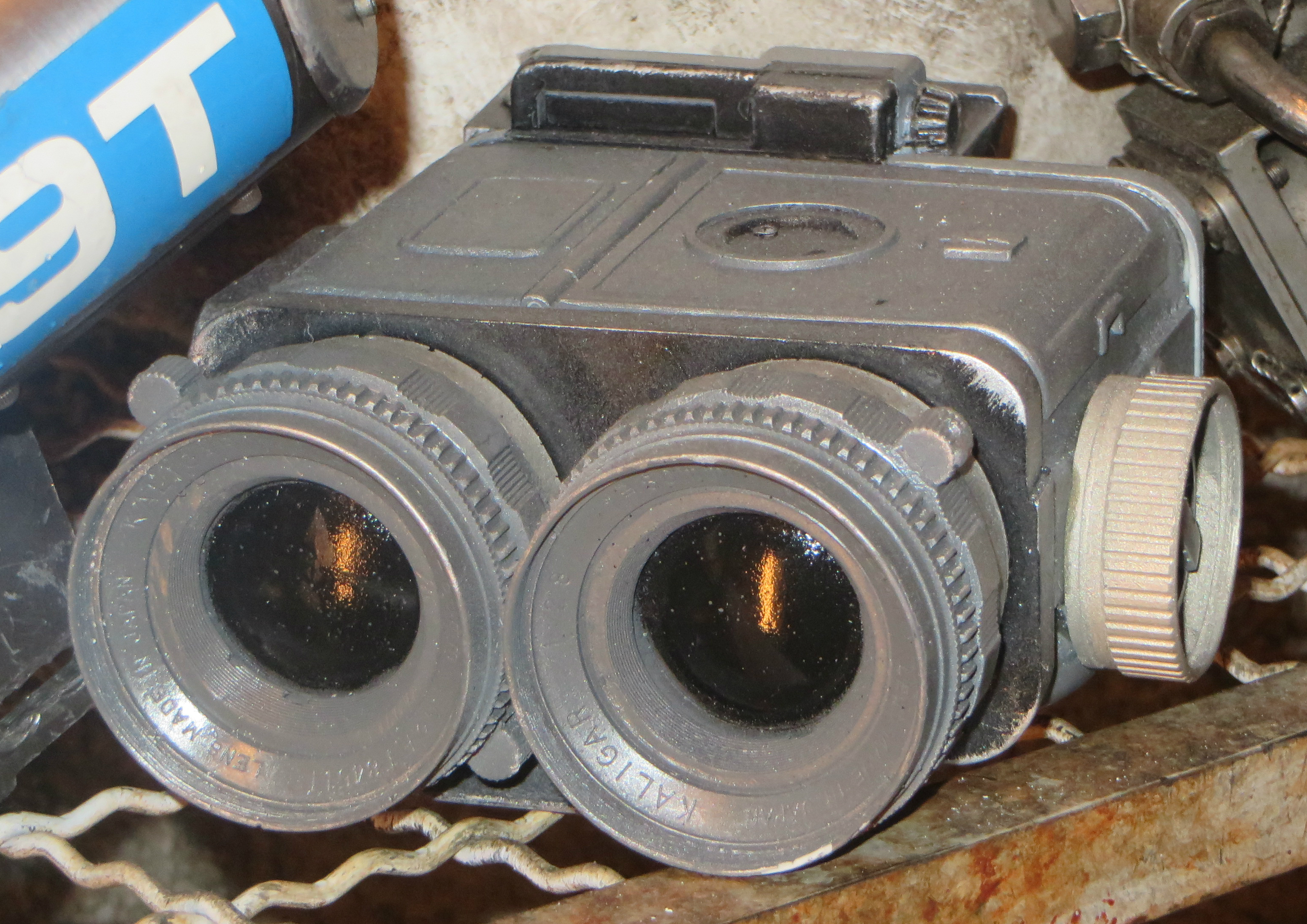
Macrobinoculars on display at Star Wars Launch Bay

Viewing devices feature in the Star Wars universe, from simple monoculars and telescopes to more advanced devices. Reference material describe macrobinoculars as hand-held devices that function like binoculars, with the purpose of giving the user the ability to see vast distances. It was first seen on film in A New Hope and mentioned in its novelization. Commonly used by farmers, hunters, and less advanced militaries, macrobinoculars have limited features such as zooming and distance measuring. Quadnoculars feature two pairs of telescopes, while electrobinoculars have greater capabilities such as particle detectors, night vision and image editing.

The websites tested.com reports that Sony has developed macrobinoculars comparable to the ones seen in Star Wars, known as DEVs, and produced in separate types of models. These give the user the ability to see great distances clearly and record their sightings.

== See also ==
- List of Star Wars air, aquatic, and ground vehicles
- List of Star Wars weapons
- Science fiction prototyping
- Star Wars: Where Science Meets Imagination

== Bibliography ==
- Barr, Tricia; Bray, Adam; Horton, Cole; Horton (2017). Star Wars: The Visual Encyclopedia. United States: DK Publishing. ISBN 978-1-4654-5962-6.
- Barr, Patricia; Bray, Adam; Jones, Matt; Horton, Cole; Wallace, Daniel; Windham, Ryder (2019). Ultimate Star Wars New Edition. United States: DK Publishing. ISBN 978-1-4654-7900-6.
- Dougherty, Kerrie; Fry, Jason; Hidalgo, Pablo; Reynolds, David West; Saxton, Curtis; Windham, Ryder (2020). Star Wars Complete Vehicles New Edition. United States: DK Publishing. ISBN 978-0-7440-2057-1.
- Luceno, James; Reynolds, David West; Windham, Ryder; Fry, Jason; Hidalgo, Pablo (2018). Star Wars: The Complete Visual Dictionary. United States: DK Publishing. ISBN 978-1-4654-7547-3.
- Lund, Kristin; Beecroft, Simon; Dougherty, Kerrie; Luceno, James; Fry, Jason (2016). Star Wars: Complete Locations. United States: DK Publishing. ISBN 978-1-4654-5272-6.
- Walker, Landry Q. (2018). Star Wars Encyclopedia of Starfighters and Other Vehicles. United States: DK Publishing. ISBN 9781465482716.
- Windham, Ryder (2019). Star Wars Rebel Starfighters Owner's Workshop Manual. United States: Insight Editions. ISBN 978-1-68383-936-1.
- Windham, Ryder (2019). Star Wars TIE Fighter Owner's Workshop Manual. United States: Insight Editions. ISBN 978-1-68383-527-1.
- Windham, Ryder (2018). Star Wars YT-1300 Millennium Falcon Owner's Workshop Manual. United States: Insight Editions. ISBN 978-1-68383-528-8.
