= Walker (Star Wars) =

Fictional weapons system in Star Wars

All Terrain Walkers are armored fighting vehicles from the Star Wars universe that traverse the landscape on mechanical legs. They are used by the Old Republic, the Galactic Empire, and the First Order for ground assault, reconnaissance or transport. Throughout the saga walkers have played a pivotal role in the fate of characters and the outcome of battles. Industrial Light and Magic (ILM) is responsible for their animation and design, often using models, stop-motion animation, and relevant matte paintings to depict their presence in the films.

There are a variety of walkers: The Empire Strikes Back and Return of the Jedi introduced the All Terrain Armored Transport (AT-AT) and All Terrain Scout Transport (AT-ST). Star Wars: Episode II – Attack of the Clones, Star Wars: Episode III – Revenge of the Sith and The Clone Wars introduced earlier Clone Wars-era models of walkers, such as the All-Terrain Tactical Enforcer (AT-TE), and the All Terrain Recon Transports (AT-RT). The Star Wars Legends continuity features numerous walker variants, several of which have been merchandised in popular culture, while the later films Rogue One and Star Wars: The Last Jedi depicted, respectively, the AT-ACT variant to the standard AT-AT, a restyled AT-AT for the First Order, and a new, even larger walker known as the AT-M6.

== All Terrain Armored Transport (AT-AT) ==
All Terrain Armored Transport
- Star Wars vehicle
- Imperial AT-AT walkers, as depicted in The Empire Strikes Back
- First appearance: The Empire Strikes Back
- Created by: Joe Johnston

Information
- Affiliation: Galactic Empire
- Made by: Kuat Drive Yards
- Auxiliary vehicles: Speeder bikes (5)

General characteristics
- Class: Walker
- Armaments: 2 heavy laser cannons; 2 medium repeating blasters; 2 targeting rangefinders
- Maximum speed: 60 km/h (37 mph)
- Length: 25.9 m (85 ft)
- Height: 22.2 m (73 ft); 22.5 m (74 ft)
- Population volume: Pilot (1); Gunner (1); Commander (1); Passengers (40)

The All Terrain Armored Transport (AT-AT) is a quadruped mechanized infantry combat vehicle used by Imperial ground forces.

The AT-AT (pronounced either casually as 'at at', or using only the letters 'A.T. A.T.') was first introduced in The Empire Strikes Back (as the Galactic Empire's main units against Rebel Alliance infantry during the Battle of Hoth) and also appears in Return of the Jedi and in Rogue One (in the AT-ACT variant).

The AT-AT also appears in a destroyed form in Star Wars: The Force Awakens, explained in the video game Star Wars Battlefront (2015) to be a residue of the Battle of Jakku, which was the Empire's last defeat and resulted in its dissolution, where Rey uses its husk for shelter. Updated forms appear in The Last Jedi (used by the First Order to attack Resistance forces in a former Rebel base).

The theme park attraction Star Wars: Rise of the Resistance, set after The Last Jedi, features two full-sized AT-ATs in a hangar bay. These walkers, while mostly static, can move their cannons to allow for a scene in which the walker's drivers spot the ride vehicles and fire at them.

=== Origin and design ===
Joe Johnston's original design for the Empire's war machines was a giant, multi-wheeled vehicle; this design later became the "Juggernaut" in West End Games' roleplaying material, and the design was reworked into the clone turbo tank for Star Wars: Episode III – Revenge of the Sith. Johnston said Lucas wanted the walkers to look like anthropomorphic walking tanks to make them frightening.

For The Empire Strikes Back, however, the final design was a four-legged walker. Inspiration for the AT-AT came from Paraceratherium, an extinct genus most closely related to living rhinoceroses, and one of the largest known land mammals. The design was also partially inspired by a Syd Mead illustration from a U.S. Steel brochure depicting walking trucks. George Lucas later dismissed claims that the AT-AT design was inspired by container cranes at the Port of Oakland (across San Francisco Bay from ILM's San Rafael offices), calling it a "myth"; animator Phil Tippett told the San Francisco Chronicle the same thing.

ILM created models ranging from six to fifty centimetres (2–20 inches) in height. ILM filmed the AT-ATs using stop-motion animation against matte paintings created by Michael Pangrazio because attempts at compositing miniature footage against live-action background footage yielded mediocre results. Additionally, ILM studied elephants to determine the best way to animate the four-legged AT-ATs. Although the stop-motion animation style gave the AT-ATs a jerky, "staccato-like" effect on film, ILM found this movement acceptable because of the AT-ATs' mechanical nature.

The sound of the AT-AT walking was created by sound designer Ben Burtt using a punch press.

=== Depiction ===
The All Terrain Armored Transport is an assault walker used by Imperial ground forces to blast through enemy lines with its sheer mass and firepower and deploy a platoon of crack assault troops. The thick armor plating on the AT-AT will deflect or absorb anything but the heaviest turbolaser weaponry, although the neck and belly are vulnerable to missiles and blasters. Standing over 22 meters (72 ft) tall, the AT-AT is as much a weapon of terror as anything else, and its mere presence is often enough to intimidate the local populace into obedience. This prodigious height helps the walker see over obstacles and provides a clear line of sight for its weaponry, carried in its heavily armored head, and it can traverse most difficult terrain using advanced terrain sensors. Its size also makes the AT-AT a conspicuous target, and the combination of a high center of gravity with unstable legs makes it susceptible to tripping. When it comes time to deploy, troops carried in the AT-AT exit out of the sides via harness-and-cable from extendable boom racks while speeder bikes exit out the front and back using harnesses.

In the Battle of Hoth, General Veers leads a group of AT-ATs and AT-STs dubbed Blizzard Force in the attack on the Rebels' Echo Base, as only slow-moving ground vehicles can penetrate the base's shield system. During the battle, the AT-AT designated Blizzard Two is destroyed when Wedge Antilles and Wes Janson use their snowspeeder's tow cable to trip it up and target its now-exposed neck with blaster fire to blow it up. Luke Skywalker destroys another AT-AT, Blizzard Four, by using a magnetic grapple to reach its underbelly, cut open a hole with his lightsaber and throw in a grenade. Ultimately the Empire is victorious as General Veers' Blizzard One destroys the shield generator, and in the ensuing rout he orders the remaining AT-ATs and AT-STs to overrun the Rebels' trenches and capture as many as possible.

A ruined AT-AT appears in Star Wars: The Force Awakens as the makeshift home of the scavenger Rey on the planet Jakku. Using scavenged parts from the walker and other vehicles, Rey is able to construct a power system for her home along with booby traps and motion sensors to deter potential thieves. The First Order uses an updated model of the AT-AT during the Battle of Crait at the end of Star Wars: The Last Jedi. Built by Kuat-Entralla Drive Yards, these versions of the venerable AT-AT address some of its stability issues and use lighter armor material to increase protection without increasing weight.

=== Analysis ===
In 2011, a fan-led effort to get a life-sized, fully functional AT-AT built was stopped by Lucasfilm as violating their intellectual property. Commenting on the effort, Heiko Hoffman, a robotics expert at HRL Laboratories, argued that building an AT-AT would easily cost US$100 million or more. He also argued that building such a vehicle would pose challenges since structural strength does not increase the same way as mass and there would be tremendous stress on the legs and joints, though he noted the AT-AT's method of walking was "statically stable" and appropriate for a heavy vehicle. A later estimate conducted in 2016 argued that building a real-life AT-AT would cost US$228.5 million. Using the M1 Abrams as a starting point, such a vehicle would weigh over 1,000 tons and generate 19 megawatts of power.

Dr. Malcolm Davis, director of the Defense & Strategy Program at the Australian Strategic Policy Institute, argues that the AT-AT has several flaws which make it an ineffective design. Compared to tracked vehicles, Davis states that while walking vehicles like the AT-AT can potentially step over obstacles, they cannot run as fast, and destroying a leg would topple one over. The AT-AT also has a limited field of fire with all its weapons mounted in the head and its slab sides would be more vulnerable to shaped charge munitions as opposed to angled sides. He notes however that its height would give its line-of-sight weaponry a greater reach and puts its occupants well above any IED explosion.

Joe Pappalardo of Popular Mechanics also argues that the AT-AT is a poorly-designed troop transport, being slow, top-heavy and conspicuous with its legs being a particular vulnerability. He contends that the Empire would have won the Battle of Hoth faster and more easily if they had deployed smaller conventional vehicles.

=== Cultural impact ===
Kenner debuted a toy version of the AT-AT to tie into the release The Empire Strikes Back, which was rereleased with updated packaging for Return of the Jedi. Lego has released many different sets of the AT-AT walker since the first one debuted in 2003. When the Ultimate Collector Series version of the AT-AT was released in 2021, it represented the second-largest Star Wars set to date, containing 6,785 pieces at a retail cost of US$799.99.

In 2017, William Plessinger of the Clintonville neighborhood in Columbus, Ohio unveiled a handmade replica of the AT-AT walker on his front lawn on Halloween night. Standing an estimated 15 to 20 feet tall, the replica took months to design and construct, and required reinforcement after it suffered storm damage. As of 2025 Plessinger has continued to put up the AT-AT every Halloween season. It also drew the attention of the 501st Legion fan club, which has used it as a backdrop for their photos.

== All Terrain Scout Transport (AT-ST) ==
All Terrain Scout Transport
- Star Wars vehicle
- An AT-ST walker, as depicted in Return of the Jedi
- First appearance: The Empire Strikes Back

Information
- Affiliation: Galactic Empire
- Made by: Kuat Drive Yards

General characteristics
- Class: Walker
- Armaments: Twin blaster cannon; Twin light blaster cannon; Concussion grenade launcher
- Maximum speed: 90 km/h (56 mph)
- Power: High-density power cells
- Height: 8.6 m (28.2 ft); 9 m (29.5 ft); 9.04 m (29.7 ft)
- Population volume: Pilot (1); Gunner (1)

The All Terrain Scout Transport (AT-ST) is a two-legged mech walker introduced briefly in the Battle of Hoth in The Empire Strikes Back and featured extensively in the Battle of Endor in Return of the Jedi. These vehicles were designed to screen and protect the flanks of slower moving AT-ATs and the larger tanks used by the Empire. Due to their design and movement, they are often dubbed as a "chicken walker". The name Scout Walker is also used to refer to an AT-ST. This name was used for the official toy instead of the AT-ST name.

An AT-ST also appears briefly in Rogue One: A Star Wars Story, patrolling Jedha City following an attack by Saw Gerrera's forces. A modified AT-ST later appears in The Mandalorian under the possession of a group of raiders, as the Empire has ceased to exist by the time of the series. An updated model of the AT-ST is used by the First Order in The Last Jedi. Shortly before the film's climax, an AT-ST is commandeered by BB-8.

Video games such as Star Wars: Rogue Squadron and Shadows of the Empire (in a much expanded Battle of Hoth) include numerous AT-STs, and these can be destroyed by direct shooting from the player's craft, in contrast to the heavily armored AT-ATs which have to be tripped by tow cables. AT-STs are also player-controllable units in several real-time strategy games.

=== Origin and design ===
A single AT-ST makes a brief appearance in The Empire Strikes Back alongside the larger AT-ATs during the Battle of Hoth. The AT-ST was meant to have more screen time; however, one scene depicting a snowspeeder shooting at the AT-ST model was ruined when the set's background shifted.

For Return of the Jedi, ILM made the AT-ST design more detailed. Numerous models were created, including a full-sized AT-ST for on-location shooting. Director Richard Marquand and producer Robert Watts had cameos as AT-ST operators for the scene in which Chewbacca (Peter Mayhew) and a pair of Ewoks commandeer an AT-ST.

Lee Seiler sued Lucasfilm in the mid-1980s, claiming that the AT-ST infringed on his copyright on what he called a "Garthian Strider", which he said he created in 1976 or 1977. The case was dismissed with the court noting that not only did Seiler not produce the supposed drawings at trial, but that the copyright came one year after The Empire Strikes Back debuted.

=== Depiction ===
According to Star Wars sources, the AT-ST was constructed as a companion to the larger AT-AT, protecting the flanks during major battles and hunting down infantry and smaller threats which evade the assault walkers. Advanced stability and sensor technology, along with the pilots' dexterity and sense of balance, allow it to move faster than and traverse terrain which would be impassible to an AT-AT. This helps it fulfill a variety of missions, including patrolling, reconnaissance and mop-up operations. In order to achieve its speed and size, the AT-ST is forced to sacrifice offensive and defensive capability. Its chin-mounted twin blaster cannon is only effective out to 2 km (1.2 mi), while the modular cheek-mounted weaponry has less range. Lightweight armor plating is proof against blasters and other small arms but cannot withstand heavier laser cannons and missiles. The AT-ST must rely on high-intensity power cells as it is too small to carry a full power generator, limiting its range.

In The Empire Strikes Back, AT-STs scout for and provide support for the slower AT-ATs during the Battle of Hoth; when the shield generator is destroyed, they race ahead of the assault walkers to capture as many of the fleeing Rebels as possible. During the ground skirmish of the Battle of Endor in Return of the Jedi, after initially inflicting heavy casualties on the Rebels and Ewoks, several AT-STs are destroyed when they prove highly vulnerable to the Ewoks' primitive booby traps, with one crushed between two large tree trunks swung on ropes. Another is hijacked thanks to Chewbacca climbing aboard and using his strength to rip open its roof hatch; he proceeds to turn its weapons against the other AT-STs to help win the battle.

An updated model of the AT-ST is used by the First Order during the Battle of Crait in The Last Jedi. Based on the classic Imperial scout walker, this version boasts improved stability and greater protection thanks to new lightweight armor plating.

=== Analysis ===
In episode 208 of MythBusters, the Build Team (Grant Imahara, Kari Byron and Tory Belleci) tested the plausibility of the scene in Return of the Jedi wherein a swinging log trap destroyed an AT-ST. The team determined that the logs in the scene each weighed approximately 10,000 lb (4,500 kg) and were swung at a 45 degree angle at the walker, impacting with the energy equivalent of around two megajoules. To test this in real life, the team created a swinging log rig out of telephone poles and, after shoring the structure up with steel reinforcement, swung replica logs at an armored truck. The team declared the myth plausible when the logs succeeded in punching the truck's side panels off its frame.

=== Cultural impact ===
In 2018, Paul Parker of Ashburton, Devon installed in his field next to the A38 road a 4.5 m (15 ft) tall replica of an AT-ST. The replica had been created by Dean Harvey four years prior as a climbing frame for his daughters, but Mr. Harvey donated the structure to Mr. Parker when they outgrew it. Mr. Parker installed the replica as a way to bring awareness to Ashburton, but was informed by the Teignbridge Council that he would have to remove due to lack of prior permission. However, the Council later allowed for the structure to remain in place for the next 10 years.

== All Terrain Tactical Enforcer (AT-TE) ==
All Terrain Tactical Enforcer
- Star Wars vehicle
- First appearance: Attack of the Clones
- Last appearance: Rebels
- Created by: Rothana Heavy Engineering

Information
- Affiliation: Galactic Republic
- Auxiliary vehicles: (2×) AT-RTs or speeders

General characteristics
- Class: Walker
- Armaments: Mass driver cannon; 6 antipersonnel laser cannon turrets
- Maximum speed: 60 km/h (37 mph)
- Length: 13.2 m (43 ft) (hull only)
- Width: 5.7 m (19 ft)
- Height: 5.7 m (19 ft) (hull and legs)
- Population volume: Pilot (1); Spotter (1); Gunners/Support Crew (4); Main Turret Gunner (1); Passengers (20)

The All Terrain Tactical Enforcer, or AT-TE walker, is a mechanized infantry combat vehicle used by the Grand Army of the Republic ground forces. Having six grappling legs and a low centre of gravity, this armored walker could navigate any terrain – even climbing vertical cliffs. It appears in Attack of the Clones, Revenge of the Sith, The Clone Wars multimedia campaign, Star Wars Battlefront II and in the early episodes from the second season of Star Wars Rebels.

=== Origin and design ===
Conceived by Ryan Church as a predecessor to the AT-AT, the AT-TE's animation for Attack of the Clones was supervised by Rob Coleman. Tom St. Amand, who worked on the AT-AT scenes in The Empire Strikes Back, provided his experience to create a similar appearance for the AT-TE.

=== Depiction ===
AT-TEs first appear in Attack of the Clones during the Battle of Geonosis, where they serve as both assault vehicles and infantry transports for the Grand Army of the Republic. Their in-universe manufacturer is Rothana Heavy Engineering, a subsidiary of Kuat Drive Yards and long-time enemy to the Trade Federation and Techno Union. A total of 2,160 AT-TEs are deployed in the battle, airlifted across the battlefield by special LAAT/c carriers to engage Separatist forces.

The walker's unique six-legged design and flexible midsection gives it excellent stability and allows it to transport two squads of clone troopers across otherwise impassible terrain. Its footpads contain terrain sensors and tractor-field generators which enhance its purchase on rough ground. They can also be magnetized, allowing the AT-TE to even hang upside-down on metal surfaces. The turret-mounted mass driver cannon atop the AT-TE can be used to bombard fixed emplacements or shoot down slow-moving aircraft, while the walker's conductive armor spreads the heat from weapon impacts and is well-shielded against electromagnetic pulse and ion attacks.

In the Star Wars Rebels episode "Relics of the Old Republic", a heavily customized AT-TE is used by clone troopers Rex, Wolffe and Gregor as a mobile residence on the planet Seelos. Modifications made to the walker include renovating the interior to make room for bunk beds and a kitchen, and replacing the main cannon with rod and reel for catching the planet's wildlife. During a confrontation with a group of Imperial AT-ATs, the clones' AT-TE is destroyed, but thanks to the crew of the Ghost the Imperials are defeated and a captured AT-AT is used to replace it.

=== Analysis ===
B.K. Lok of That Hashtag Show argues that the AT-TE is the best-designed walker in the Star Wars universe. Specifically in comparison to the AT-AT, they argue it's harder to hit, is more stable, and possess greater all-around weapons coverage. Daniel Dimanna of Screen Rant, however, argues that the AT-AT is the superior walker. While acknowledging the AT-TE's better stability and maneuverability, he cites the AT-AT's more powerful weaponry, impenetrable armoring, and greater carrying capacity as making it the definitive Star Wars walker. Blake Hawkins of CBR refers to the AT-TE as "slow, awkward and kind of ridiculous" but states that Episode 10 of The Bad Batch helped redeem it by showcasing its ability to navigate over difficult obstacles and its ability to intimidate the local populace.

== All Terrain MegaCaliber Six (AT-M6) ==
All Terrain MegaCaliber Six
- Star Wars vehicle
- First appearance: Star Wars: The Last Jedi
- Created by: Kuat-Entralla Drive Yards

Information
- Affiliation: First Order

General characteristics
- Class: Walker
- Armaments: MegaCaliber Six turbolaser; 2 heavy fire-linked dual laser cannons; 2 medium antiship laser cannons
- Length: 40.87 m (134.1 ft)
- Width: 17.95 m (58.9 ft)
- Height: 36.18 m (118.7 ft)
- Population volume: Pilot (1); Gunner (1); Vehicle Commander (1); Weapon Engineers (2); Passengers (12)

The All Terrain MegaCaliber Six, or AT-M6 walker, is a mobile siege engine utilized by the First Order in their attempt to reconquer the galaxy. Built around a massive turbolaser cannon carried on its back, this simian-shaped walker combines equal parts devastating firepower and psychological warfare. These walkers made their theatrical appearance in The Last Jedi as the First Order attempted to wipe out the Resistance in the Battle of Crait, and have appeared in other multimedia related to the sequel trilogy.

As part of a promotional tie-in for the release of The Last Jedi, Nissan unveiled a concept car based on the AT-M6 called the Nissan Titan. Weighing about 6,500 pounds and using primarily molded aluminum parts, the Titan was built in partnership with Vehicle Effects, which also built cars for the Fast & Furious and Marvel Cinematic Universe (MCU) franchises. It was the most labor-intensive of several Star Wars-themed cars debuted in the run-up to the movie's release.

=== Origin and design ===
In making a new walker vehicle based on the AT-AT for the First Order, the creative team behind The Last Jedi wanted to address the tow-cable vulnerability which had been highlighted in The Empire Strikes Back. Kevin Jenkins, the movie's design supervisor, suggested to Rian Johnson that it be based on a gorilla instead of a dog so they could not be tripped up. Photos of real-life gorillas were used as a starting point for the final design and helped to give the AT-M6 a distinctive and aggressive posture.

=== Depiction ===
According to background material, the AT-M6 is considered the First Order's most powerful combat walker. Unlike the preceding AT-AT which functioned as an assault transport, the AT-M6 is primarily a platform for a MegaCaliber Six turbolaser carried on its back. Capable of penetrating deflector shields rated to withstand planetary bombardments, the weapon requires a dedicated power plant and several auxiliary fuel cells to reduce recharge time. The AT-M6's heavily armored front legs were modified to handle the weight and massive recoil of firing the weapon, and feature ventilation gates which double as cable-cutters. This locomotion system also gives the walker the appearance of a giant simian predator which, combined with firepower to rival a battleship, is meant to help intimidate an opponent into submission.

With the Resistance entrenched on Crait at a former Rebellion base, a contingent of AT-M6s are among the First Order forces deployed to the planet's surface to engage them, providing escort for a massive superlaser siege cannon. Despite the Resistance's best efforts, the walkers are able to hold them off and the cannon punches a hole through their defenses. However, the arrival of Jedi Master Luke Skywalker distracts the First Order and allows the Resistance to successfully escape.

=== Analysis ===
In comparing the AT-M6 to its predecessor, Dr. Malcolm Davis notes that, while the specific vulnerability to tow-cable attacks was addressed, many of the same criticisms applied to the AT-AT still hold true for the First Order's walker. A more realistic design he argues would look similarly to the massive tanks which feature in the Bolo universe. Joe Pappalardo likewise believes that the AT-M6 is even worse than the AT-AT because it has all of the same problems but increased in scale. He argues it was a lost opportunity to not give the walker the same agility as its simian inspiration and allow it to use its massive arms to walk, climb and swing more easily over obstacles.

== List of other Star Wars walkers ==
Many vehicles were created for various Star Wars media and depicted as technological evolutionary predecessors and successors to the walkers featured in the original trilogy.

=== In film and television ===
Utilized by the Republic, Empire and First Order

- All Terrain Attack Pod (AT-AP): Featured in Revenge of the Sith and Clone Wars media, as a variation of the AT-PT. Alex Jaeger designed the AT-AP per Lucas' request to "diversify the Clone armor". Nicknamed the "sniper tank", the AT-AP features a variety of artillery weapons, a retractable third leg for stability, and other offensive features.
- All Terrain Open Transport (AT-OT): Introduced in Revenge of the Sith and other sources, is a heavily armored transport whose open design makes it vulnerable from above. The AT-OT can transport 34 clone troopers, who are protected by thick armor and four laser cannons. During the late stages of Revenge of the Sith's development, it was called the "Clone CAT walker".
- All Terrain Recon Transports (AT-RT): Introduced in Revenge of the Sith operated by clone troopers searching for Yoda (Frank Oz) on Kashyyyk. The AT-RT is described as a precursor to the AT-ST, though it also shares similarities to the AT-PTs of the same era. A scene cut from Revenge of the Sith would have shown Yoda distracting clone troopers while Chewbacca removes them from their AT-RT in a manner similar to how he obtains control of an AT-ST in Return of the Jedi. AT-RT animators studied AT-ST movement to recreate part of the "original funkiness of movement" caused by the stop-animation style used in the original trilogy. For the 2026 San Diego Comic-Con, Hasbro plans to unveil an AT-RT with accompanying ARF clone trooper as part of its Black Series of models. Retailing at $79.99 USD, the model will be exclusive to the Hasbro booth at the convention before receiving limited release on their website. A remote-control AT-RT toy was released by Jada Toys to tie into the release of The Mandalorian and Grogu which features a scene of the eponymous characters riding the vehicle. Lego also released a minifigure version of the AT-RT for the movie's release.
- All Terrain Defense Pod (AT-DP): Introduced in Star Wars Rebels, the AT-DP is described by Star Wars references as a successor to the AT-RT, combining speed with an armored cockpit to protect a pilot and gunner. Standing 11.6 m (38 ft) high and weighing 11,200 kg (24,700 lb), the AT-DP can reach speeds of 90 km/h (56 mph). Because it is only armed with a single Kyuzo Maad-38 heavy laser cannon, the Empire primarily uses AT-DPs for defensive purposes like policing or sentry duty. A miniature version of the AT-DP was released by Lego in 2015 as part of a polybag set which was included with other Star Wars sets.
- All Terrain Mobile Artillery (AT-MA): Introduced in The Force Awakens, the AT-MA is a model of quadruped base defense walker used by the First Order to defend Starkiller Base. While it resembled the All Terrain Armored Transport once used by the Galactic Empire in terms of size and weaponry, the AT-MA was primarily designed for defense, rather than transport or assault. Several of these walkers were deployed across the planet to protect its installations, and at least three of them were present during General Armitage Hux's speech before the destruction of the Hosnian system. Several AT-MAs were portrayed in the ground vehicles storage area of a Resurgent-class Star Destroyer.
- All Terrain Armored Cargo Transport (AT-ACT): Introduced in Rogue One, these walkers are slightly larger than the standard AT-AT, with a hollowed-out center section that can hold a cargo container. Director Gareth Edwards instructed the film's concept artists to design walkers based on their idealized memory of the AT-AT. According to background material, the AT-ACT was built for hauling cargo at Imperial construction sites and research facilities. Larger than AT-ATs at 31.9 m (105 ft) tall, an AT-ACT's central container can hold 550 m^{3} (19,000 cu ft) of cargo. Although not meant for use on the battlefield, the AT-ACT is heavily armored against most handheld weapons and equipped with two Taim & Bak MS-2 heavy laser cannons, allowing it to be deployed into combat in an emergency. For the release of the Rogue One movie, Beast Kingdom announced a 1:7-scale model of the AT-ACT. Measuring 12 ft (3.7 m) tall by 4.2 ft (1.3 m) wide and 9.8 ft (3.0 m) long, the model weighed 3,800 lb (1,700 kg) and retailed for $35,000. Also coinciding with the release of the movie, Colin Furze partnered with eBay to build a replica of the AT-ACT. The 5.5 m (18 ft) tall model took Furze and his team a month to complete and was given away to a Star Wars fan.
- All Terrain Heavy Hauler (AT-HH): Featured in The Last Jedi, the AT-HH is described in Star Wars sources as a tug walker, a vehicle designed to pull heavy loads on the battlefield. The walker measures 29.57 m (97.0 ft) in length, 27.43 m (90.0 ft) in width and 14.29 m (46.9 ft) in height, and has a crew of two pilots, one commander, two engineers and four gunners. With thirty-one legs in total split between three rows, the AT-HH can lose twelve of its legs and still fulfill its mission, using tow cables (each a bundle of 27,572 steelton wires) to drag objects into position. In addition to heavy armor plating, each AT-HH is defended by medium fire-linked dual laser cannons, one per corner.
- All Terrain Heavy Scout (AT-HS): A model of walker fielded by the First Order. The LEGO version of the AT-HS was based on a piece of concept art for The Last Jedi which, although canon, was ultimately not used in the final cut of the film.
- All Terrain Cold-weather Mobile Heavy Cannon (AT-CMHC): A remodeled variant of the Umbaran UMHC used by the Imperial Military. This prototype model was specialized in sub-zero temperatures.

Utilized by other factions

- Skara Nal Keeper: An ancient droid walker and superweapon created by the Ancients long before the founding of the Jedi Order, this walker was buried on the planet of Skara Nal, with a crystal known as the Heart of the Mountain keeping it dormant. The walker was massive and was propelled by four legs, and was armed with a head-mounted superlaser that was capable of significant amounts of destruction. It was the subject of a pirate legend that the Bad Batch investigated with treasure hunter Phee Genoa, who activated it by removing the Heart. The walker was destroyed when the crystal was returned to prevent the destruction of the Bad Batch's shuttle Marauder.
- Umbaran mobile heavy cannon (UMHC): Used by Umbarans during the Clone Wars. Later, both the Imperial Army and Alliance to Restore the Republic used them during the Galactic Civil War. MHCs were heavily armored and had an articulated electromagnetic plasma cannon mounted on top of its dome-like body.

=== In Expanded Universe media ===
- All Terrain Personnel Transport (AT-PT): Introduced during the climax of Timothy Zahn's novel Dark Force Rising, is a two-legged, one-person vehicle designed for the Old Republic as a one-man squad. These were designed to only fit one pilot, who gets in through a small side door. In an emergency, an extra person can be squeezed into the claustrophobic cockpit. This walker also had the interesting feature of having legs that can "crouch" when needed.The AT-PT is equipped with two blaster cannons, a concussion grenade launcher, and an array of sensors.The Empire would later end up finding and stealing these designs as the inspiration to the AT-AT and the AT-ST. The AT-PT is also featured in several video games, including Star Wars: Rogue Squadron, Star Wars: Force Commander, and Star Wars: Galactic Battlegrounds.
- Mountain Terrain Armored Transport (MT-AT): Introduced in Jedi Academy Trilogy, dubbed "spider walkers", are octrupedalism specially for mountain terrain. These specific walkers can walk almost vertically, and are delivered through pods launched from larger ships
- All Terrain Anti-Aircraft (AT-AA): Featured in various Expanded Universe media, is a four-legged anti-aircraft vehicle used by the Galactic Empire.

The All Terrain Advance Raider (AT-AR) appears in Marvel Comics' Star Wars series, and an All Terrain Experimental Transport (AT-XT) appears in LucasArts' Star Wars: The Clone Wars game. DK Publishing's Attack of the Clones: Incredible Cross-Sections book mentions an All Terrain Heavy Enforcer (AT-HE).

== Merchandise ==
Kenner released AT-AT and AT-ST toys as part of their Empire Strikes Back line, and Hasbro released toys based on those molds when the Special Edition trilogy was distributed. Micro Machines also released AT-AT, AT-ST, and AT-TE toys. Both Decipher Inc. and Wizards of the Coast published AT-AT and AT-ST cards for their Star Wars Customizable Card Game and Star Wars Trading Card Game, respectively. Lego has released AT-AT, AT-ST, AT-DP, AT-AP, AT-OT, AT-RT, AT-TE, AT-M6, and AT-HS models.

== See also ==
- Mecha
- Iron Dobbin, an early mechanical horse from 1933
- Walking Truck, a real-world quadrupedal "walker" from 1969
- BigDog, a dynamically stable quadruped military robot built in 2005

== Bibliography ==
- Barr, Tricia; Bray, Adam; Horton, Cole; Horton (2017). Star Wars: The Visual Encyclopedia. United States: DK Publishing. ISBN 978-1-4654-5962-6.
- Barr, Patricia; Bray, Adam; Jones, Matt; Horton, Cole; Wallace, Daniel; Windham, Ryder (2019). Ultimate Star Wars New Edition. United States: DK Publishing. ISBN 978-1-4654-7900-6.
- Dougherty, Kerrie; Fry, Jason; Hidalgo, Pablo; Reynolds, David West; Saxton, Curtis; Windham, Ryder (2020). Star Wars Complete Vehicles New Edition. United States: DK Publishing. ISBN 978-0-7440-2057-1.
- Luceno, James; Reynolds, David West; Windham, Ryder; Fry, Jason; Hidalgo, Pablo (2018). Star Wars: The Complete Visual Dictionary. United States: DK Publishing. ISBN 978-1-4654-7547-3.
- Lund, Kristin; Beecroft, Simon; Dougherty, Kerrie; Luceno, James; Fry, Jason (2016). Star Wars: Complete Locations. United States: DK Publishing. ISBN 978-1-4654-5272-6.
- Taylor, Chris (2014). How Star Wars Conquered the Universe: The Past, Present, and Future of a Multibillion Dollar Franchise (eBook). Basic Books. OCLC 889674238.
- Walker, Landry Q. (2018). Star Wars Encyclopedia of Starfighters and Other Vehicles. United States: DK Publishing. ISBN 9781465482716.
