= Malloy Hoverbike =

The Malloy Hoverbike is a single-seater turbo-fan powered, vertical take-off and landing (VTOL) quadcopter developed in 2006 by New Zealand inventor Chris Malloy. The hoverbike has two forward and two aft-mounted vertical propellers each enclosed in a hoop nacelle. The nacelles feature steerable blades beneath which control the direction of flight. Each propeller pair has partial overlap and when not in use they can be folded over each other to further reduce the parking footprint and make packing and transportation easier.

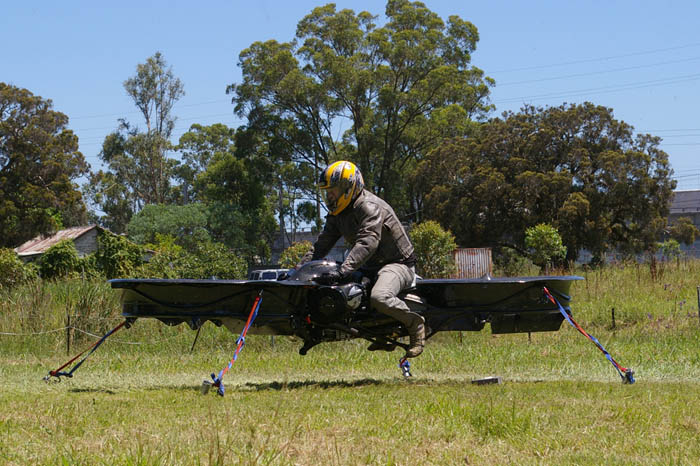
An early tethered flight test

With the production of the Malloy Hoverbike, Chris Malloy set up his aeronautical firm Malloy Aeronautics, based at White Waltham airfield, South-West of London, United Kingdom. The company was responsible for the commercial development and production of the hoverbike. The hoverbike participated in the 2015 Paris Airshow.

Hoverbike is constructed from carbon fibre composite and aluminium and is powered by a petrol engine. It can be piloted with minimum training or fly autonomously and has a "Home" button. It can carry a 130-kilogram (290 lb) payload at a speed of 96 kilometres per hour (60 mph) and has a ceiling of 3,044 meters (9,987 ft).

In support of the U.S. Army Armament Research, Development and Engineering Center (ARDEC), Malloy Aeronautics has been working collaboratively with SURVICE Engineering Company. Under a contract with the United States Army Research Laboratory Survice and Malloy took part in the Army's Picatinny Pallet Sustainment Aerial Mobility Vehicle (SAMV) programme.

The Malloy Hoverbike has been compared to the speeder bikes seen in George Lucas's popular science fiction saga Star Wars although the input functions of the hoverbikes seen in Star Wars are significantly distinct from the input functions of the Malloy Hoverbike.

Malloy Aeronautics Ltd continues to work in the area of VTOL technology and is currently building heavy lift electric unmanned logistics drones.

In January 2024 the company was acquired by BAE Systems.
