= Lely =

Lely can refer to:

- Cornelis Lely, Dutch engineer and statesman
- Peter Lely, Dutch portrait painter of the 17th century
- Jan Anthony Lely, inventor of the Lely method
- Durward Lely, Scottish opera singer and actor
- Lely, a census-designated place in Florida, the United States
- Lely, a Dutch agricultural machine manufacturer
- Lely High School, a high school in Naples, Florida
