= Walking Truck =

Experimental transport robot

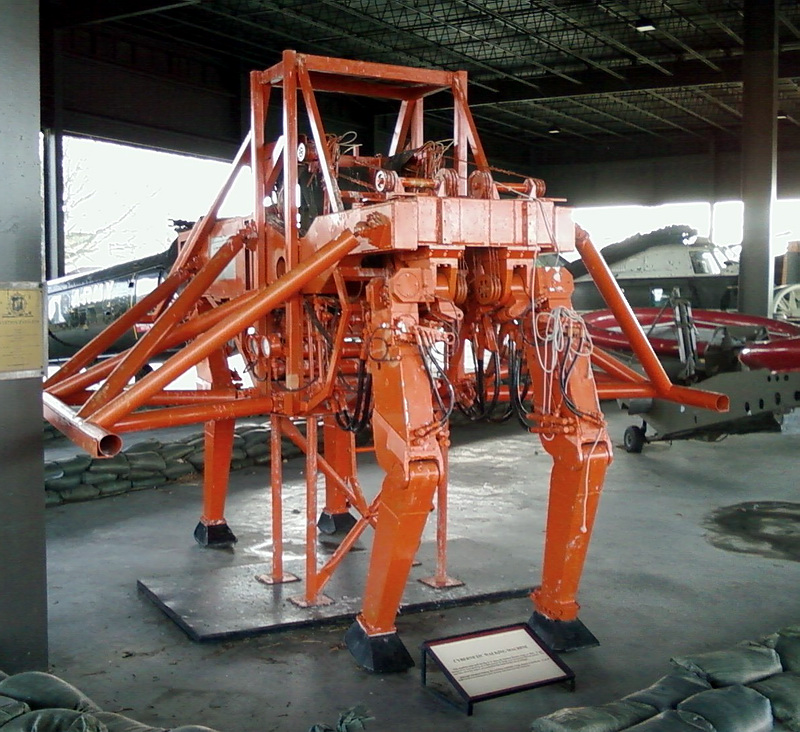
Walking truck in the U.S. Army Transportation Museum in Fort Eustis

The Walking Truck or Pedipulator was an experimental quadruped walking vehicle created in 1965 by General Electric. It was intended for use by the United States Army and was designed by Ralph Mosher as a way to transport equipment over rough terrain. The Walking Truck was controlled by a human operator positioned inside the machine, with human foot and hand motion coupled to the movements of mechanical legs. Only one prototype of the Walking Truck was produced, which weighed about 3000 lb and failed to reach speeds greater than 5 mph. It alternatively bore the name CAM, an acronym for Cybernetic Anthropomorphous Machine. In 1968, Walter Cronkite covered the Walking Truck in a segment of The 20th Century.

== Operation ==
The stepping of the machine was controlled by a human operator through foot and hand movements coupled to hydraulic valves. The complex movements of the legs and body pose were done entirely through hydraulics. The hydraulic fluid and pressure was supplied through an off-board system. The walking truck was one of the first technological hardware design applications to incorporate force feed-back to give the operator a feel of what was happening.

As of 2019, the surviving prototype can be seen at the U.S. Army Transportation Museum in Fort Eustis, Virginia. The robot weighed 3,000 pounds (1,400 kg) and could walk up to 5 miles per hour (8 km/h). It was exhausting to control and, according to program lead Ralph Mosher who was the designer and primary driver, operators could only drive the walking truck for a limited time.

== Modern variants ==
Plustech, a Finnish subsidiary of American agricultural, construction, and forestry machinery manufacturer John Deere, developed a "Timberjack Walking Machine" or "Walking Tractor" meant to traverse forested terrain. Locomotion is provided by six articulated legs, and it is capable of moving forward, backward, sideways, and diagonally.

== See also ==
- Hardiman, another project of Ralph Mosher's
- BigDog
- Iron Dobbin
- Walker (Star Wars), in particular the AT-AT
- Strandbeesten
