= Hoverbike =

Personal vehicle capable of hovering

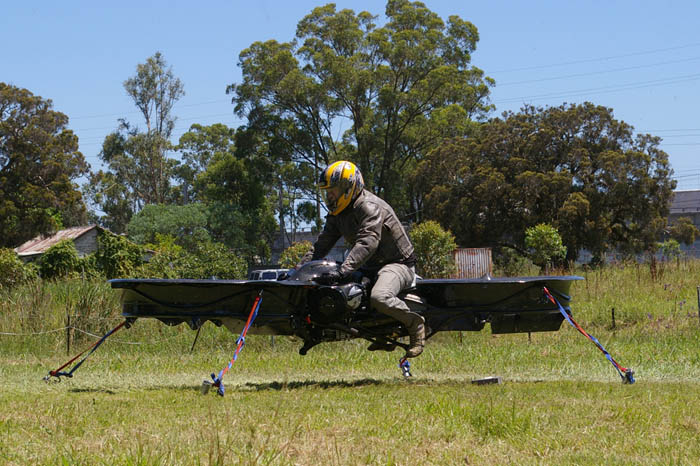
The Malloy Hoverbike, an early hoverbike, undergoing tethered hover testing in 2010

A hoverbike (or hovercycle) is a vehicle that can hover, resembling a flying motorbike, having at least two propulsive portions—one in front of and one behind the driver. It is often used as a staple vehicle in science fiction and near future settings, but since the early 2010s, some attempts have been made at developing a functional, practical hoverbike.

== Aeronautic motors ==
Starting in 2014, Malloy Aeronautics has been developing the Malloy Hoverbike, which uses a quadcopter-like lift. In 2015, the company announced collaboration with the United States Department of Defense at the Paris Airshow.

External videos
- World's first fully-manned hoverbike tested in Moscow on YouTube

In April 2016, British inventor Colin Furze announced he had created a hoverbike using two paramotors.

The Aero-X is a hoverbike designed to carry up to two people.

The Hoversurf Scorpion 3 is a hoverbike launched in 2017. It is used in limited numbers by the Dubai Police Force.

The A.L.I. Technologies XTurismo was on sale in Japan from 2021, and in the United States the following year. It requires a pilot's licence in most countries, but not in Japan. It is considered a proof of concept with 200 to be made, with a smaller version planned for 2025, at a much lower price. The concept existed in Japan since 2000.

Subaru filed a patent for a "land and air" vehicle with the first application was published by the U.S. Patent and Trademark Office (USPTO) on March 4, after being filed on May 13, 2020, with an original filing in Japan on August 28, 2019.

A one-person, or unmanned cargo, flying vehicle with four jet motors at the corners using artificial intelligence to maintain stability that has been described as a "flying motorbike" and named "Speeder" was under development in 2022, an idea that emerged from work with the US Navy. By early 2022, several full-size prototypes had been built, with a top speed of 200 miles per hour (320 km/h), and flight endurance of 60 minutes.

== In fiction ==
- This concept is commonly used in futuristic cyberpunk games such as Mass Effect 3 or Cyberpunk 2077.
- In the Star Wars universe, characters use speeder bikes lifted by repulsorlift engines.
- The Halo video game franchise features the single-pilot Ghost hovercraft/hoverbike.
- In the video game Heroes of the Storm, heroes can use numerous types of hovercycles as mounts to increase their movement speed on the battlefield.
- The video game Grand Theft Auto Online features the Oppressor Mk II, an armed jet-powered hoverbike itself loosely based on the hoverbikes seen in the 2012 film Looper, added to the game in 2018.
- In the television series Kamen Rider Revice, Kamen Rider Revi rode a hoverbike based on the A.L.I. Technologies XTurismo as his main mode of transport.
- The Jet Moto video game series was focused around Hoverbike racing.
- The arcade game V-Racer Hoverbike.

== See also ==
- Hoverboard
- Hovercar
- Flying platform
- Ground effect vehicle
- Personal hovercraft
