= Lely Juno family =

Automated farm equipment brand

Lely Juno
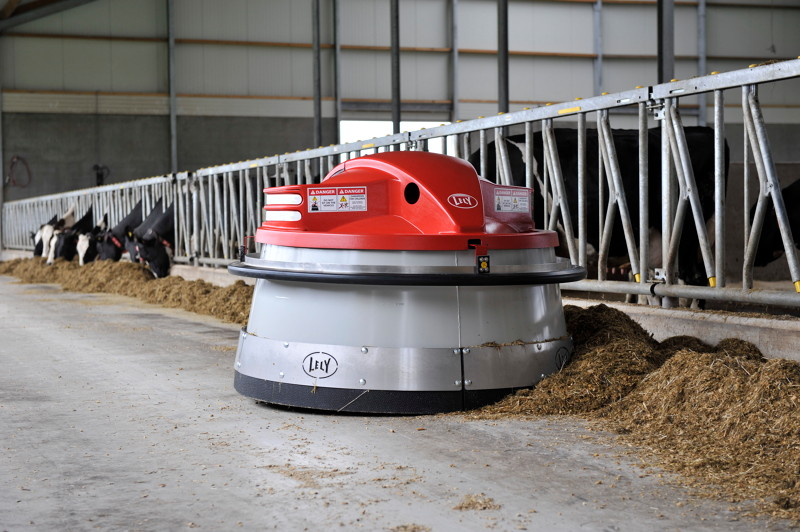
- Manufacturer: Lely Industries N.V.
- Year of creation: 2008; 18 years ago
- Type: Automatic feed pusher
- Purpose: Agricultural robot

The Lely Juno family is a family of robot series produced by Lely, headquartered in the Netherlands. The Lely Juno is an autonomous feed pushing robot designed to move forage closer to the feed fence at regular intervals. In total more than 13,000 Juno models have been installed so far.

== Models ==
The robots come in various models.

Former models
| | Year of introduction | Notes | References | Photo |
|---|---|---|---|---|
| Lely Juno | 2008 | first generation | | |
| Lely Juno 150 | 2011 | | | |
| Lely Juno 100 | 2011 | | | |
| Lely Juno (J1) | 2018 | Retroactively after the introduction of the J2, this Juno was referred to as the Juno J1 in technical documents, among other things. | | |

Current models
| | Year of introduction | Notes | References | Photo |
|---|---|---|---|---|
| Lely Juno (J2) | 2022 | refresh, J2 | | |
| Lely Juno Max | 2024 | | | |
