= Iron Dobbin =

Mechanical horse first described in 1933

The iron Dobbin that appeared in Popular Science Monthly in April 1933

The Iron Dobbin was a mechanical horse which was first described in Popular Science Monthly in April 1933. The machine, designed by an Italian inventor, was powered by a gasoline engine and moved upon steel pipes allowing it to traverse a rough field. The device was to be used to train the youth of the Gioventù Italiana del Littorio to ride, but was rejected by the Italian military as impractical.

The German military, after seeing the Iron Dobbin in Popular Science, designed the Panzerpferd for their Gebirgsjaeger troops, which was also rejected.

== See also ==
- Walking truck
- BigDog
- Cislaghi Motoruota
