= Lely (company) =

Dutch dairy robots manufacturer

Lely Industries N.V.
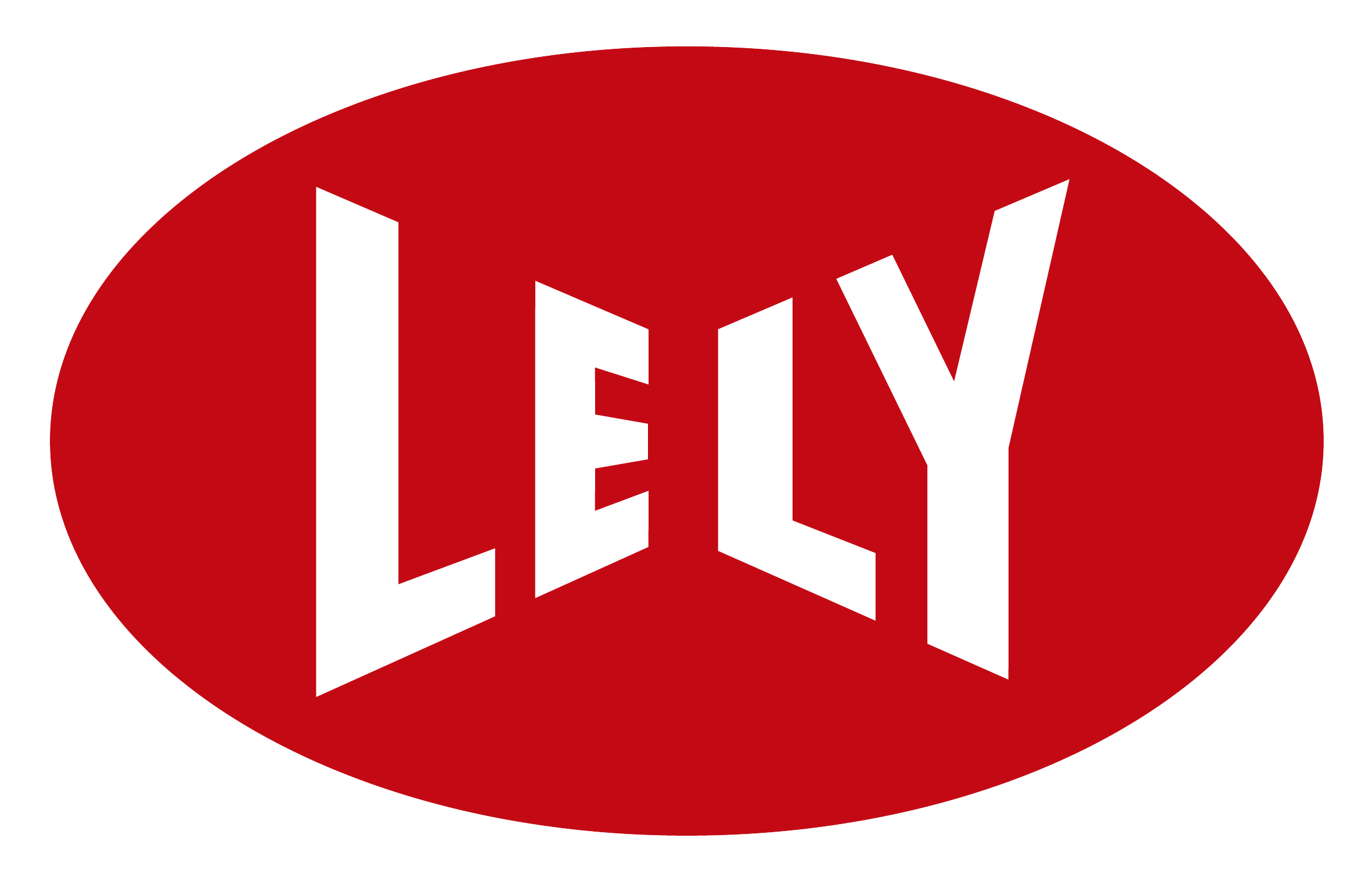
- Type: Private company
- Industry: Agriculture
- Founded: 1948; 78 years ago
- Founders: Cornelis van der Lely; Arij van der Lely
- Headquarters: Maassluis, Netherlands
- Revenue: ▲€1,014 million (2025)
- Number of employees: 2500
- Website: www.lely.com

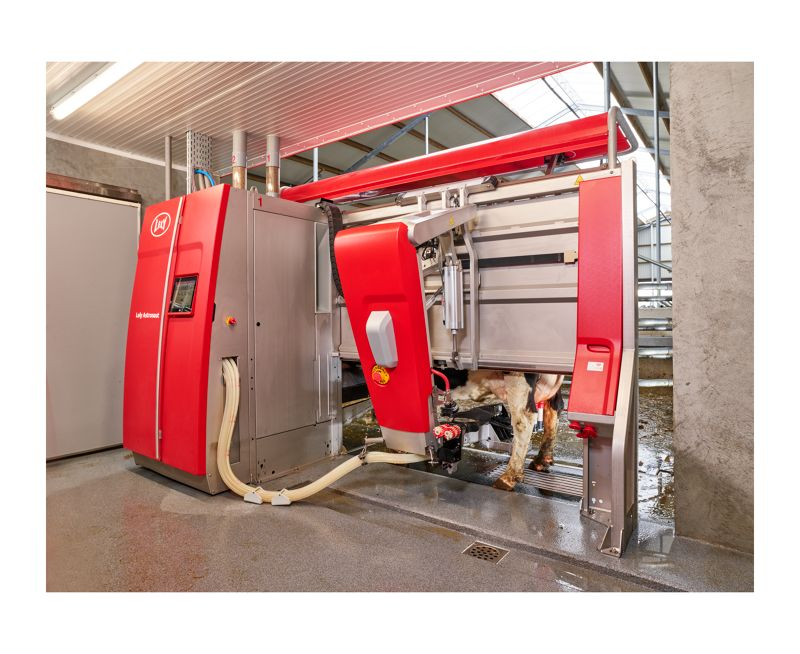
Milking robot Lely Astronaut A5

Lely Industries N.V. is a Dutch agricultural machine and robots manufacturer which is based in Maassluis, the Netherlands. It is considered one of the leading dairy robot manufacturers.

== History ==
The company was founded in 1948 by the Lely brothers, Cornelis van der Lely and Arij van der Lely, in Maassluis.

In 2004, Lely established their North America headquarters in Pella, Iowa.

In 2011, Lely set up their automated milking machine assembly on the Vermeer Corporation campus.

In 2012, the company acquired Aircon GmbH and subsequently renamed it as Lely Aircon B.V.

At the end of 2016, Lely ceased tipper production in Waldstetten.

In March 2017, the sale of the forage harvesting technology division with the plants in Waldstetten (loader wagons) and Wolfenbüttel (baling presses) to AGCO was announced.

In 2019, the company's milking system reached the finals of the 2019 European Inventor Award.

In 2022, Lely expanded their Pella, Iowa campus and moved their manufacturing to a new building.

Products

- Lely Astronaut A5 (and A5 Next)
- Lely Astronaut A4
- Lely Astronaut A3 (and A3 Next)
- Lely Astronaut A2
- Lely Astronaut A1
- Lely AMF Automatic Milking Filter
- Lely Cosmix
- Lely Discovery
- Lely Discovery Collector
- Lely Discovery Collector C2
- Lely Zeta
- Lely Horizon
- Lely Luna
- Lely Meteor
- Lely Calm
- Lely Vector
- Lely Juno
- Lely Juno Max
- Lely Orbiter

== See also ==
- Automated milking
