= Aero-X =

The Aero-X hoverbike was an aircraft created by Aerofex, an aerospace engineering corporation based in Los Angeles, designed to carry up to two people. Public sales were planned to start in 2017, but has since been discontinued. No Aero-X hoverbikes were ever listed for sale.

== Vehicle ==
Aerofex say that the vehicle could rise 10 feet from the ground and could travel at a maximum of 45 miles per hour. It was expected to weigh 785lb and be 15 feet in length. The bike ran for around 75 minutes on a full tank of fuel.

The Aero-X did not fly with the same energy efficiency as a helicopter, due to its rotor blades being shorter, but it is much smaller in size and safer near humans. This craft reportedly did not produce the brownout of helicopters, as it was designed to be able to operate near people without blowing any significant amount of dust.

== Development ==
The vehicle started development in 2008 and was originally planned for use by one person or as an unmanned drone.

One of the difficulties of this technology involves stability and control, preventing the craft from frequent rollovers and crashes. To achieve this, Aerofex added two control bars which the rider could access at knee level and easily lean to one side or the other to balance the craft.

The price had been given as $85,000.

== Planned usages ==
The planned usages included agricultural field work, delivering materials in rough terrain, and for search and rescue vehicles. In December 2017, Aerofex received a second international patent in Japan. The Peripheral Control Ejectors (PCE) patented will allow Aerofex unmanned vehicles to spray crops.

== See also ==
- Roadable aircraft
- Hovercraft
- Hovertrain
- Hoverboard
- Hovercar
