= Speeder bike =

Fictional transport device

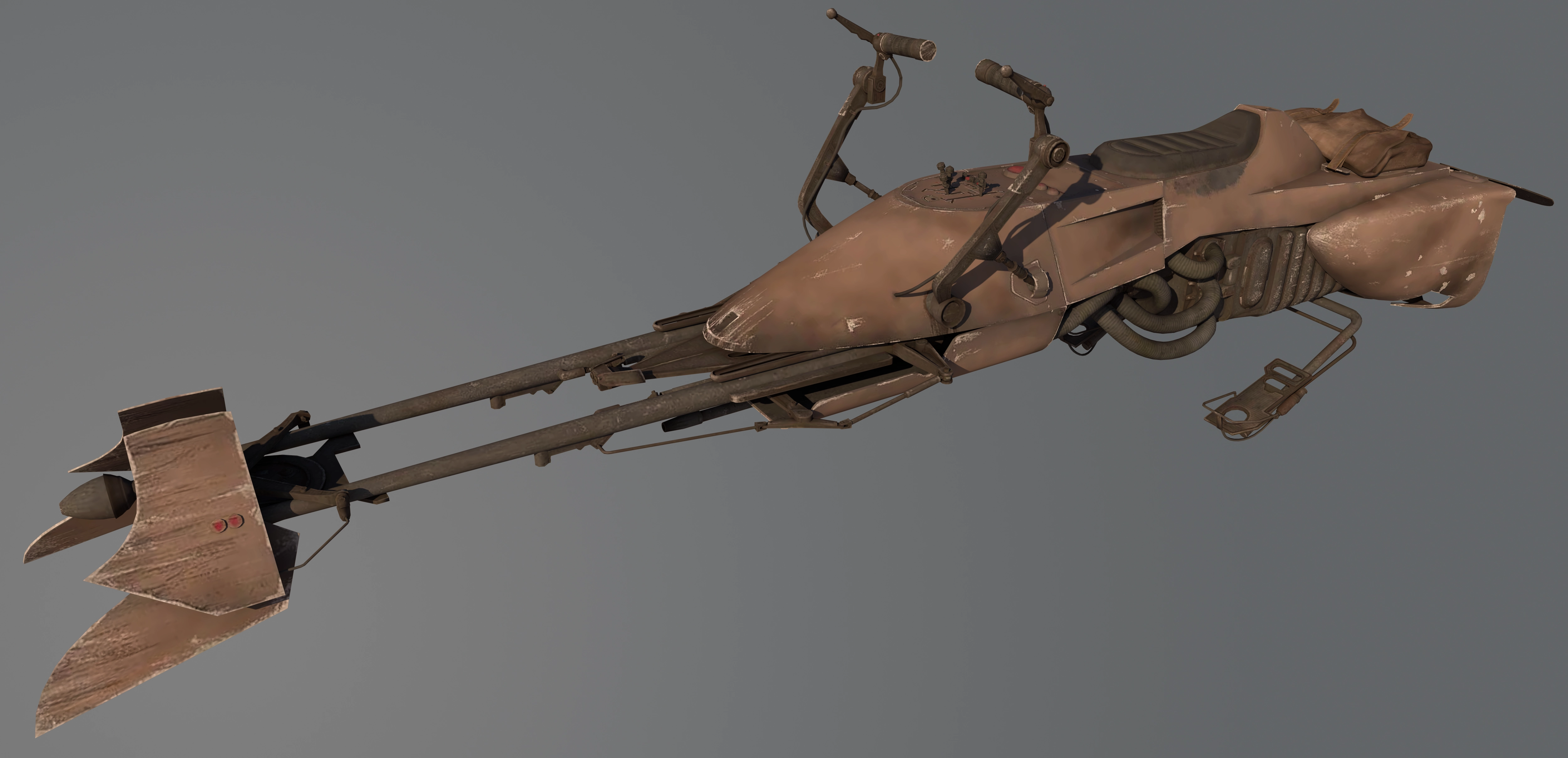
Speeder bike

Speeder bikes (also known as "jumpspeeders" or "hover bikes") and swoop bikes (or just "swoops") are small, fast transports that use repulsorlift engines in the fictional Star Wars universe. Return of the Jedi includes a prominent speeder bike chase; speeders and swoops also appear in Episode I: The Phantom Menace, Episode II: Attack of the Clones, Episode III: Revenge of the Sith, Episode IV: A New Hope (added in the 1997 Special Edition), the animated TV series Star Wars: The Clone Wars and Star Wars Rebels, and the Star Wars Expanded Universe's books, comics, and games.

== Origin and design ==
Brian Daley's 1979 novel Han Solo's Revenge makes the first mention of a swoop, described as a kind of scooter.

Franchise creator George Lucas called for a "rocket-powered scooter" in Return of the Jedi, leading to various concept sketches for the speeder bike. While Industrial Light & Magic's (ILM) Nilo Rodis-Jamero designed a blocky vehicle with a large engine, Ralph McQuarrie's designs were more fanciful but with less of a sense of the vehicle's power source. The final designs resulted in full-scale Imperial speeder bikes used by the actors for film against a bluescreen, along with miniatures mounted by articulated puppets. ILM used a steadicam recording at 1 frame per second to record the speeder bikes' path through the forest moon of Endor—in reality, a California forest. Playing the footage at the standard rate of 24 frames per second caused a blurring effect, which ILM used to simulate the vehicles' high speed; what was shot at 5 miles per hour (8.0 km/h) looked like 100 miles per hour (160 km/h).

The BARC speeder in Revenge of the Sith was designed to appear like a predecessor to the speeder bikes in Return of the Jedi. ILM's Doug Chiang designed Darth Maul's (Ray Park) speeder in The Phantom Menace to resemble a scythe, and Chiang's initial designs for the droid army's STAP vehicle resembled the speeder bikes from Return of the Jedi. An all-CGI swoop appearing in A New Hope stems from a design created for Star Wars: Shadows of the Empire, and the swoop also appears briefly in The Phantom Menace.

== Depiction ==
In the Star Wars universe, speeder bikes are a type of "repulsorcraft", vehicles which use anti-gravity devices called repulsorlifts to hover above the surface of a planet. Compared to other repulsorcraft, speeder bikes sacrifice unnecessary systems in order to achieve greater speed or agility. Swoop bikes, being little more than an engine with seats, are similar but better suited for operating at higher altitudes. In the Legends video game Knights of the Old Republic, swoop racing is a main part of the story with the player having to work for The Hidden Beks, a swoop gang, by infiltrating rival swoop gang, The Black Vulkars, and competing against them in a swoop race in order to rescue Bastila. "Swoop racing" is described as a dangerous, fast-paced competition between skilled pilots.

=== Types of speeder bikes ===
- 74-Z Speeder Bike: The 74-Z speeder bike makes its first appearance in Return of the Jedi as Imperial scout troopers patrol the forest surrounding the shield generator on Endor; during the movie's speeder bike chase Luke Skywalker (Mark Hamill) and Leia Organa (Carrie Fisher) pilot a pair of speeders to chase down scout troopers who might reveal the Rebel Alliance's presence on Endor. Background material on the bike explains how the 74-Z, built by the Aratech Repulsor Company, was originally used by the Republic during the Clone Wars before being adopted by the Empire. The bike measures 3.3 m (11 ft) long, can carry one or two passengers, and achieves a maximum speed of 500 km/h (310 mph). In addition to a self-charging battery system, sensors and communication equipment, the 74-Z is armed with an Ax-20 blaster cannon, though being stripped of all excess weight the bike offers no protection for the rider.
- Sith Speeder: Darth Maul is seen using a speeder bike to chase down Qui-Gon Jinn (Liam Neeson) and Anakin Skywalker (Jake Lloyd) in The Phantom Menace, identified in Star Wars material as a Razalon FC-20 speeder bike. It is described as being a popular model with assassins and other criminals because of its ability to perform sharp turns and a compactness that makes it harder to track, though the small size also requires it be more frequently recharged. Darth Maul's bike, the Bloodfin, has been stripped of all weaponry and sensors to make his lighter and faster, achieving a top speed of 650 km/h (400 mph).
- Flitknot Speeder: The Flitknot speeder bike is first seen in Attack of the Clones, when Count Dooku (Christopher Lee) uses one to escape the battle of Geonosis to return to his solar sailer. These bikes are of simple design, with more bulk at the back in the engines than anywhere else, as well as two handholds and two footholds. They are fast and maneuverable, able to outrun Republic gunships.
- BARC Speeder: The BARC speeder first appears in Revenge of the Sith as Jedi Master Stass Allie is turned upon by her clone trooper escorts when Darth Sidious (Ian McDiarmid) initiates Order 66. Manufactured by the Aratech Repulsor Company, the speeder bike's name is explained as being derived from the specialist clone troopers (Biker Advanced Recon Commandos) who typically pilot these craft. Armed with a pair of blaster cannons, the BARC speeder is 4.6 m (15 ft) long and can reach a top speed of 520 km/h (320 mph). It normally seats only one passenger but can be modified with mission-specific sidecars.
- C-PH Patrol Speeder Bike: Also known as Imperial patrol speeders, these bikes are used by Imperial patrol troopers to police shipyards and industrial facilities of value to the Empire. Manufactured by the Aratech Repulsor Company, they use a bank of forward-facing repulsorfield vector guides. They first appear in Solo: A Star Wars Story, in which a patrol trooper piloting one such speeder pursues Han Solo and Qi'ra.
- Zephyr-J: The Zephyr-J is a model of speeder bike used in the Outer Rim territories and manufactured by Mobquet Swoops and Speeders. It makes its debut in "Chapter 5: The Gunslinger" of The Mandalorian; the titular character uses this type of speeder.

== Cultural impact ==
Ben Brosofsky of Screen Rant has called speeder bikes an iconic part of Star Wars ever since their introduction in Return of the Jedi and described them as capturing the intensity of the movie. Ryan Britt of Inverse and Ben Sherlock of Screen Rant both describe the speeder bike chase as one of the most iconic scenes of the Star Wars saga. Ken Napzok in Why We Love Star Wars: The Great Moments That Built a Galaxy Far, Far Away contrasts the speeder bike chase scene with the drag race scene in American Graffiti and how both represent George Lucas' love for "fast-moving things".

The speeder bike, specifically the 74-Z as seen in Return of the Jedi, was ranked as one of the top vehicles of the Star Wars universe by Dean Evans of DRIVEN Car Guide. Described as the "ultimate superbike" and "cooler than Boba Fett", he argues its real-world equivalent would be the Ducati 996. Ken Napzok also praises the 74-Z as being a sublime design which even young fans can grasp easily.

Many fans of the Star Wars series have also been inspired to build life-size "working" replicas. In 2016, a group of fans used Jetovator water-propelled jet packs to create several 74-Z replicas to film a recreation of the speeder bike chase scene. Vintage Works of Green Bay, Wisconsin, built a replica 74-Z speeder bike in 2017 using a Zero electric motorcycle. Also in 2017, a team from Lithium Cycles worked with YouTube prankster Jesse to build a pair of 74-Z bikes using their Super 73 electric street motorcycles which they showed off on the streets of New York City. In order to give the appearance the vehicles "hovered", the team placed mirrors underneath the bikes to shroud the wheels.

Although lacking the anti-gravity technology ascribed to speeder bikes, real-life hoverbikes utilize different principles of levitation with the goal of achieving a similar effect. Mark DeRoche of Aero-X maker Aerofex said it was "a tribute to George Lucas' team" that their prototype hoverbike – a low-altitude tandem duct aerial vehicle – resembled Star Wars speeders. The HoverSurf HoverBike has also been compared to Star Wars speeder bikes, though it achieves flight by the same methods as a traditional quadcopter. The Japanese manufacturer AERWINS Technologies introduced in 2022 the XTURISMO hoverbike, which was inspired by and has been compared to Star Wars speeder bikes.

Since their inception, speeder bikes have been included in several Star Wars product lines, including Lego models and Hasbro miniatures.

== Bibliography ==
- Barr, Tricia; Bray, Adam; Horton, Cole; Horton (2017). Star Wars: The Visual Encyclopedia. United States: DK Publishing. ISBN 978-1-4654-5962-6.
- Barr, Patricia; Bray, Adam; Jones, Matt; Horton, Cole; Wallace, Daniel; Windham, Ryder (2019). Ultimate Star Wars New Edition. United States: DK Publishing. ISBN 978-1-4654-7900-6.
- Luceno, James; Reynolds, David West; Windham, Ryder; Fry, Jason; Hidalgo, Pablo (2018). Star Wars: The Complete Visual Dictionary. United States: DK Publishing. ISBN 978-1-4654-7547-3.
- Lund, Kristin; Beecroft, Simon; Dougherty, Kerrie; Luceno, James; Fry, Jason (2016). Star Wars: Complete Locations. United States: DK Publishing. ISBN 978-1-4654-5272-6.
- Walker, Landry Q. (2018). Star Wars Encyclopedia of Starfighters and Other Vehicles. United States: DK Publishing. ISBN 9781465482716.
