= Malloy Aeronautics =

British manufacturer of unmanned aerial vehicles

- Industry: Aerospace
- Founded: 2013
- Founder: Chris Malloy
- Headquarters: Maidenhead, England
- Key people: Neil Appleton (CEO)
- Products: See Products
- Parent: BAE Systems
- Website: https://www.malloyaeronautics.com

Malloy Aeronautics is a British company which specialises in the research and development of heavy lift vertical take-off and landing (VTOL) unmanned aerial vehicles (UAVs). Based in Maidenhead, England, the company was founded in 2013 by Chris Malloy and has activities in the United Kingdom, United States and Australia. Its products include the T-series of heavy lift drones, which are primarily designed for logistics purposes, for private, commercial, military and government use. In the United States, its products are sold in partnership with SURVICE Engineering. In February 2024, the company was acquired by BAE Systems and merged into its FalconWorks division.

== Products ==
The company designs and manufactures a range of electrical vertical take-off and landing (eVTOL) drones for private, commercial, military and government use. They are primarily designed for logistics and resupply, but larger models can also be used for casualty evacuation, anti-submarine warfare, mine countermeasures, search and rescue, close air support, surveillance and monitoring. They are capable of autonomous flight and are equipped with sense and avoid technologies and autoland systems.

In the United States, the drones are marketed and manufactured by SURVICE Engineering in Belcamp, Maryland.

T-Series Drones
Product	Maximum payload capacity	Range	Cruise speed	Notes
T80	30 kilograms (66 lb)	55 kilometres (34 mi)	25 metres per second (56 mph)	
T150	68 kilograms (150 lb)	70 kilometres (43 mi)	30 metres per second (67 mph)	
T400	180 kilograms (400 lb)	70 kilometres (43 mi)	35 metres per second (78 mph)	
T600	200 kilograms (440 lb)	80 kilometres (50 mi)	38 metres per second (85 mph)	
T650	300 kilograms (660 lb)	80 kilometres (50 mi)	38 metres per second (85 mph)	

The T-650 was unveiled in September 2021 at the DSEI trade exhibition in London. It was developed in collaboration with BAE Systems and was showcased carrying a Sting Ray torpedo. In September 2022, it was showcased with three Brimstone ground-attack missiles.

In September 2023, the T600 took part in Exercise REP(MUS) in Portugal and demonstrated its ability to release a Sting Ray torpedo. During the same year, the company had produced nearly 200 drones, a significant increase over the 12–15 it had produced in 2021. To meet this increased demand, the company grew from 30 to 90 employees.

== Customers ==
=== United States ===
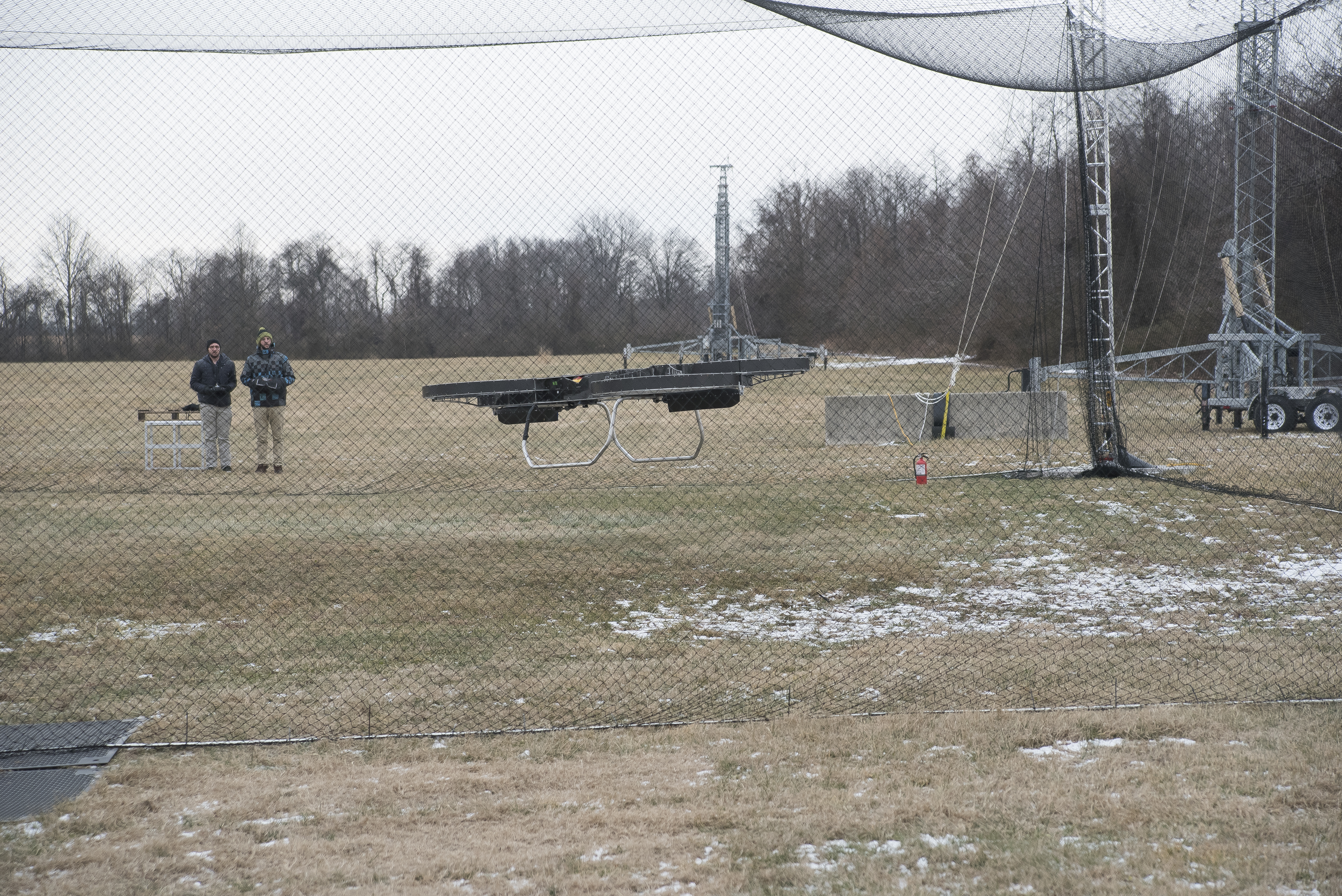
The JTARV prototype during a flight demonstration in January 2017.

In June 2015, it was reported that the United States Department of Defense had signed a contract with Malloy Aeronautics to develop a derivative of its Malloy Hoverbike, named the Joint Tactical Aerial Resupply Vehicle (JTARV). It was envisioned for multiple roles, including troop transport, surveillance, logistics and resupply. A one-third scale version was developed in the UK for a proof of concept prior to a demonstration of a full-scale prototype by the US Army in September 2016 and January 2017. The prototype was designed for a maximum payload of 136 kilograms (300 lb) with the intention to later increase this to 362 kilograms (798 lb). Initially a US Army project, it was later joined by the US Marine Corps in June 2016.

The DoD also acquired a number of smaller tactical drones under the Tactical Resupply Unmanned Aircraft System (TRUAS) program for trials and experimentation. These included the T80 and the T150, known in service as Tactical Resupply Vehicles (TRVs). These vehicles won first place in a NAVAIR fly-off competition in 2020, ahead of competing vehicles from AirBuoyant, Bell Textron and Pacific Aerospace Consulting. The T150 also participated in trials at sea as part of the US Navy's Fleet Experimentation Program (FLEX) in 2022. The trials involved the drone landing autonomously onboard USNS Burlington (T-EPF-10). In April 2023, the US Navy and Marine Corps placed an order for around 200 TRVs. This was followed by an order for 23 T150s for the US Marine Corps in December 2023. The first six production models entered service in November 2023.

=== United Kingdom ===
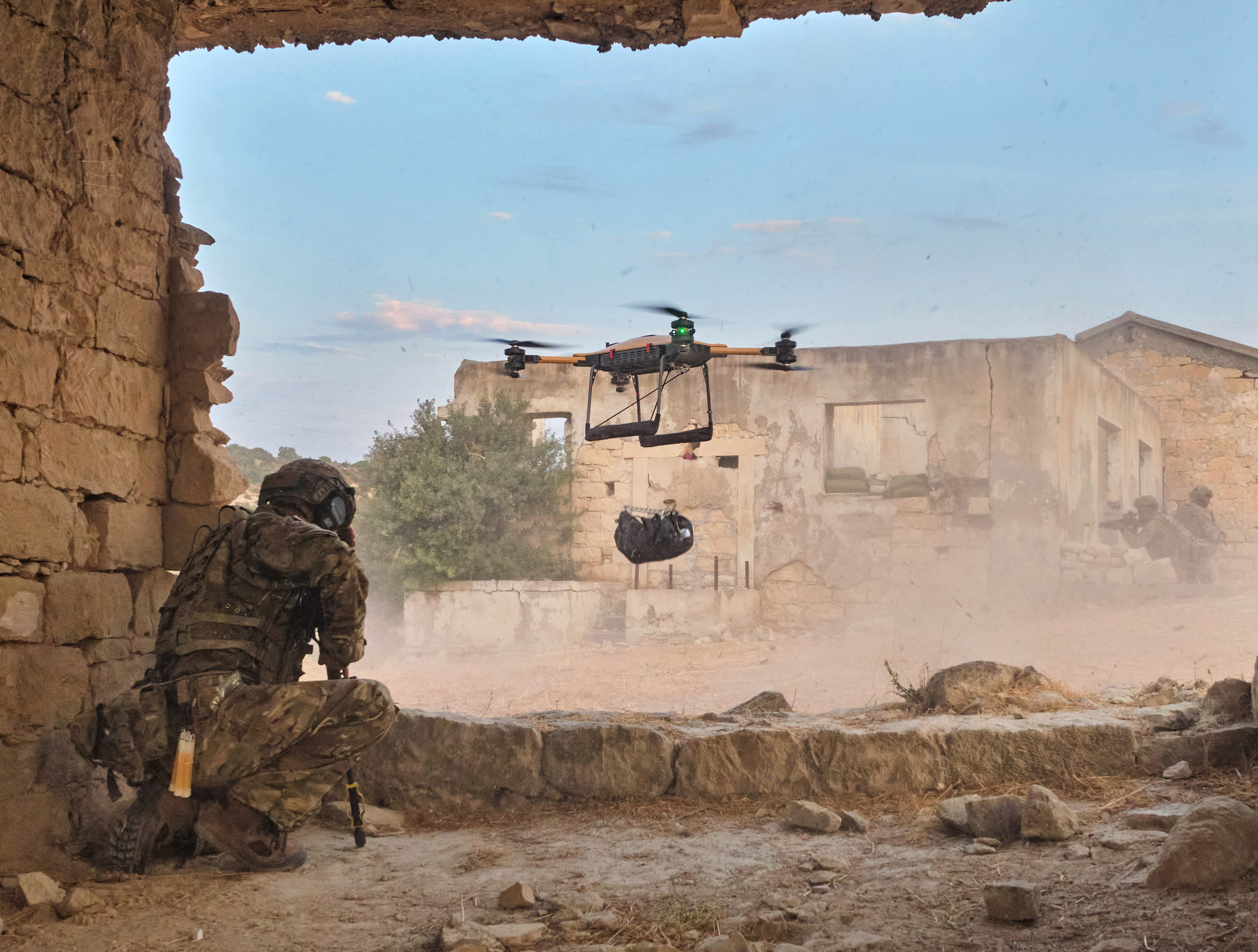
A Malloy Aeronautics T-150 during trials with the Royal Marines in 2020.

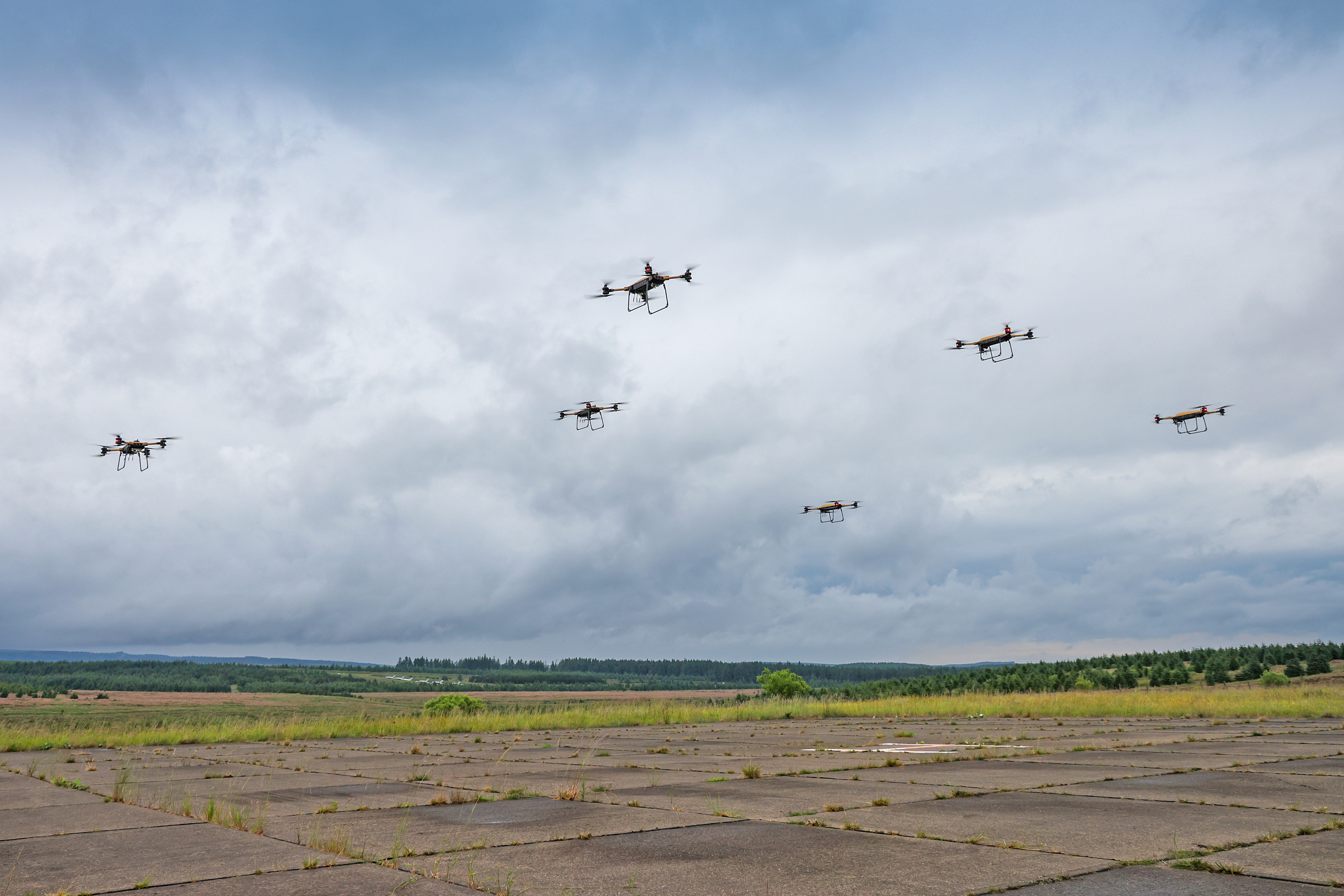
A swarm of six T150s supporting the Royal Marines in 2022; this was the UK's first military drone swarm.

The Ministry of Defence procured an unknown number of drones for use in trials and experimentation. In 2018, Malloy Aeronautics collaborated with Qinetiq and several other industry partners in Team Metis to develop an autonomous resupply vehicle concept for an MOD competition, named Last Mile Resupply. The company's hoverbike was a key part of the concept which ultimately won the competition.

In November 2020, a number of T150 drones were used by the Royal Marines during a trial deployment of the nascent Littoral Response Group (North). The drones were used extensively to fly from ship to shore with ammunition, food and supplies to replenish commandos on the ground. During the same year, under Project Minerva, the MOD awarded Malloy Aeronautics a contract to develop its T80 drone to be used as a man overboard recovery system for the Royal Navy. The Royal Navy also tested a Malloy Aeronautics drone for its ability to operate in extreme weather conditions, as well as its ability to land on moving vessels. In August 2020, three T150s were showcased onboard aircraft carrier HMS Prince of Wales (R09) with each configured differently with cargo, an unmanned underwater vehicle (UUV) and a life raft delivery system.

In July 2021, six T150s were used by the Royal Marines in the UK's first military drone swarm. The swarm was autonomously controlled from a single ground control station and was tasked with resupplying commandos with ammunition and blood. It was later re-tasked to carry out reconnaissance for commando raids.

The T600 participated in the Royal Navy's two Heavy Lift Challenges held in 2021 and 2022. These challenges tested a variety of commercially available drones for their ability to carry supplies to the frontline for disaster relief or to support Royal Marines operations. They were also tested for their ability to supply vessels, such as aircraft carriers. The first challenge involved lifting payloads greater than 100 kg but this was upscaled to 200 kg in the second challenge. The results were described as "spectacular" by Royal Navy Chief Technology Officer Brigadier Dan Cheesman CBE.

In November 2022, the British Army trialed a T400 for casualty evacuation (CASEVAC).

In February 2024, following years of trials use, the Royal Marines confirmed an order for 22 T150s.

In April 2025, the Royal Navy announced plans to deploy nine T150s, operated by 700X Naval Air Squadron, as part of a UK Carrier Strike Group deployment to the Far East. The drones will be used to transfer stores between ships, a task previously undertaken by helicopters.

=== Ukraine ===
An undisclosed number of T150s were supplied to Ukraine by the United Kingdom as military aid during the Russo-Ukrainian War. They were used to deliver blood, munitions and other key supplies to Ukrainian marines operating on the bank of the Dnieper river. Russian forces have claimed to have downed at least one of the drones, which they stated was fitted with an explosive device. In April 2026, Ukrainian forces reportedly destroyed a bridge over the Konka river in the Russia occupied part of Kherson region. The T-150 drones were used to place a total of 1.5 tonnes of explosives under the bridge in a 60-day long mission.

=== Others ===
Japan ordered two T150s for evaluation in February 2024.

In October 2023, Danish energy company Ørsted trialed a Malloy Aeronautics drone to service a wind turbine in the Hornsea Wind Farm in a world first.
