= Star Wars Rebels =

American animated television series

- Genre: Action-adventure; Science fiction; Comedy-drama; Tragedy; Dystopia
- Created by: Simon Kinberg; Dave Filoni; Carrie Beck
- Based on: Star Wars by George Lucas
- Voices of: Taylor Gray; Vanessa Marshall; Freddie Prinze Jr.; Tiya Sircar; Steve Blum; Dave Filoni
- Composers: Kevin Kiner; John Williams (themes)
- Country of origin: United States
- No. of seasons: 4
- No. of episodes: 75 (list of episodes)

Production
- Executive producers: Simon Kinberg; Dave Filoni; Greg Weisman (Season 1)
- Producers: Kiri Hart; Athena Yvette Portillo; Carrie Beck
- Running time: 22 minutes
- Production companies: Lucasfilm; Lucasfilm Animation

Original release
- Network: Disney XD
- Release: October 3, 2014 – March 5, 2018

Related
- Star Wars: The Clone Wars; Star Wars: The Bad Batch; Ahsoka

Star Wars Rebels is an American animated science fiction television series produced by Lucasfilm Animation and set in the shared universe of Star Wars. The series begins 14 years after Star Wars: Episode III – Revenge of the Sith (2005) and progresses toward the events of the original film (1977). (Note: Later titled Star Wars: Episode IV – A New Hope) It depicts the Galactic Empire hunting down the last of the Jedi while a fledgling rebellion against the Empire emerges. The visual style of the series is inspired by the original Star Wars trilogy concept art by Ralph McQuarrie. The series features new characters, along with some from the original trilogy and from the previous animated series, Star Wars: The Clone Wars (2008–14; 2020). The series comprises four seasons.

The series premiered as a one-hour television film, Spark of Rebellion, on October 3, 2014, on Disney Channel prior to the premiere of the series on October 13 on Disney XD. The second season premiered on June 20, 2015, with a one-hour television film, The Siege of Lothal. The third season premiered on September 24, 2016, with the television film, Steps Into Shadow. The fourth and final season premiered on October 16, 2017, with another one-hour television film, Heroes of Mandalore. Its final episode aired on March 5, 2018.

Dave Filoni, Simon Kinberg, and Greg Weisman served as executive producers of the first season. Weisman left the show after the first season. Filoni was also the supervising director for the first two seasons, a role he relinquished after accepting a promotion that expanded his creative role into overseeing all Lucasfilm Animation projects; he chose Justin Ridge to succeed him for the third season. Filoni re-assumed the role for the fourth season.

Rebels has been generally well-received with several award wins and nominations. The show was nominated for the Critics' Choice Television Award for Best Animated Series and the Primetime Emmy Award for Outstanding Children's Program. Rebels became the first recipient of the Saturn Award for Best Animated Series on Television, winning for its final two seasons.

A number of tie-in media have been released to expand upon the series' lore such as the comic book series Kanan, the novel A New Dawn, and the novel series Thrawn. Characters, storylines, and elements introduced in the series would also appear in subsequent Star Wars media, including the Disney+ live-action series The Mandalorian and Ahsoka, the latter of which serves as a direct continuation of Rebels.

== Premise ==
Fourteen years after the fall of both the Galactic Republic and the Jedi Order and the rise of the Galactic Empire, a motley group of rebels called the Spectres unite aboard a light freighter called the Ghost and begin to conduct covert operations against Imperial forces on and around the planet Lothal and on other planets that are menaced by the Empire.

== Cast and characters ==
=== Main ===
- Taylor Gray as Ezra Bridger, a teenage street kid who is taken in by Kanan to be trained as a Jedi
- Vanessa Marshall as Hera Syndulla, a Twi'lek pilot turned Rebel Commander (later General) and the daughter of Ryloth freedom fighter Cham Syndulla.
- Freddie Prinze Jr. as Kanan Jarrus, formerly known as Jedi Padawan Caleb Dume, who survived the events of Order 66. He is Ezra's mentor and leader of the Ghost crew.
- Tiya Sircar as Sabine Wren, a young Mandalorian warrior who's fixated on art.
- Steve Blum as Garazeb "Zeb" Orrelios, a former Lasat honor guard member and rebel who wants the Empire to pay for massacring his people.
- Dave Filoni as Chopper (credited as "Himself" prior to the series finale), Hera's astromech droid who can be a bit reckless.

=== Recurring ===
- David Oyelowo as Agent Kallus, an influential member of the Imperial ground team who is tasked with overviewing Imperial activities.
- James Earl Jones as Darth Vader (seasons 1–2, 4), a powerful Sith Lord who was once the Jedi Knight Anakin Skywalker, but is now the apprentice of Darth Sidious. This would be the final time Jones would voice Darth Vader himself after signing over the rights to recreate his voice
  - Matt Lanter as Anakin Skywalker, a former Jedi Knight who became Darth Vader.
- Jason Isaacs as the Grand Inquisitor (season 1–2), a former Jedi Temple Guard who turned to the dark side and was tasked with hunting down surviving Jedi.
- David Shaughnessy as Commandant Cumberlayne Aresko and Taskmaster Myles Grint (season 1), Imperial officers stationed on the planet Lothal.
- Liam O'Brien as
  - Yogar Lyste (season 1–3), an Imperial lieutenant stationed on Lothal.
  - Morad Sumar (season 1, 3), a farmer on Lothal, and an old friend of Ezra Bridger's parents.
- Keith Szarabajka as Cikatro Vizago (season 1–2, 4), a Devaronian crime lord who the Ghost crew occasionally runs errands and smuggles goods for in exchange for credits and information.
- Kath Soucie as
  - Maketh Tua (season 1–2), a Lothal native and a minister for the Galactic Empire, and a graduate of the Imperial Academy.
  - Mira Bridger (season 1–2, 4), Ezra's mother, who was taken captive by the Empire
- Phil LaMarr as Bail Organa (season 1, 3–4), the Senator of planet Alderaan, owner of the droids C-3PO and R2-D2, secretly one of the leaders organizing the Rebel Alliance, and adoptive father of Leia Organa.
- Brent Spiner as Gall Trayvis (season 1), an Imperial Senator posing as a dissident in an attempt to lure rebel forces out of hiding.
- Dante Basco as Jai Kell (season 1, 4), a Lothalian aiding Ezra and the Ghost crew during the Imperial occupation of Lothal as part of Ryder Azadi's rebel cell
- Dee Bradley Baker as
  - Kassius Konstantine (season 1–3), a dismissive Imperial Navy admiral in charge of the Imperial blockade on Lothal and later assisting in the Empire's rebellion pursuit.
  - Ephraim Bridger (season 1–2, 4), Ezra's father, who was taken captive by the Empire
  - Old Jho (season 1–3), an Ithorian who operated a cantina known as Old Jho's Pit Stop on Lothal
  - Captain Rex (season 2–4), a former high-ranking Clone trooper who served under Anakin Skywalker in the Clone Wars. He also voices Commander Wolffe and Captain Gregor.
- Ashley Eckstein as Ahsoka Tano (season 1–2, 4), the former Padawan of Anakin Skywalker, who aids the rebellion with pivotal assets.
- Stephen Stanton as
  - Grand Moff Tarkin (season 1, 3–4), a ruthless Imperial officer who oversees many of the Empire's activities.
  - AP-5 (season 2–3), an inventory droid that sides with the Rebels and assists them in finding a suitable base after developing an unlikely friendship with Chopper.
  - Ben Kenobi (season 3), a Jedi Master in exile on Tatooine.
- Keone Young as Commander Jun Sato (seasons 2–3), the leader of the Phoenix Squadron rebel cell.
- Ian McDiarmid as Darth Sidious, (season 2^{[a]}, 4) the tyrannical ruler of the galaxy and the Sith Lord known to the galaxy as Emperor Palpatine as well as the master of Darth Vader.
- Philip Anthony-Rodriguez as Fifth Brother (season 2), an Inquisitor of an unknown species and the partner of the Seventh Sister.
- Sarah Michelle Gellar as Seventh Sister (season 2), a Mirialan Inquisitor and the partner of the Fifth Brother.
- Jim Cummings as Hondo Ohnaka (season 2–4), a Weequay who led a group of space pirates that operated on the Outer Rim during the Clone Wars.
- Gina Torres as Ketsu Onyo (season 2, 4), a Mandalorian bounty hunter working for the Black Sun, is an old friend of Sabine Wren.
- Clancy Brown as Ryder Azadi (season 2–4), the former Governor of Lothal and a family friend to Ephraim and Mira Bridger.
- Kevin McKidd as Fenn Rau (season 2–4), the Protector of Concord Dawn, part of the elite Protectors organization who guard the royal family of Mandalore.
- Sam Witwer as Maul (season 2–3), a rogue Sith Lord and former apprentice to Darth Sidious who seeks to hunt down his nemesis Obi-Wan Kenobi.
  - Witwer voices Darth Sidious in season 2.
- Lars Mikkelsen as Grand Admiral Thrawn (season 3–4), a Chiss high-ranking senior officer of the Galactic Empire known for his tactical cunning.
- Mary Elizabeth McGlynn as Arihnda Pryce (season 3–4), a high-ranking officer of the Galactic Empire and Governor of the Lothal sector. She is mentioned in prior seasons but does not physically appear until S3.
- Tom Baker as The Bendu (season 3), a Force-sensitive alien who resided on the remote planet of Atollon and represented the "center" of the Force, between the light side and the dark side.
- Nathan Kress as Wedge Antilles (season 3–4), a former Imperial TIE fighter pilot who defects to the rebellion.
- Mario Vernazza as Vult Skerris (season 3–4), a pilot who served as an Imperial captain, he flew a TIE/IN interceptor with red markings, and wore a TIE pilot flight suit with yellow stripes on the helmet and arms.
- Zachary Gordon as Mart Mattin (season 3–4), a nephew of Commander Jun Sato and the leader of Iron Squadron.
- Forest Whitaker as Saw Gerrera (season 3–4), a Rebel extremist and former freedom fighter.
- Sharmila Devar as Ursa Wren (season 3–4), Sabine's mother, the current leader of Clan Wren, and former member of Death Watch.
- Ritesh Rajan as Tristan Wren (season 3–4), Sabine's brother.
- Genevieve O'Reilly as Mon Mothma (season 3–4), the official leader of the Rebel Alliance.
- Michael Bell as Jan Dodonna (season 3–4), a general and leader of the Rebel base on Yavin IV.
- Warwick Davis as Rukh (season 4), a Noghri assassin who, while technically not being a part of the Empire's forces, serves as an agent and tracker to Admiral Thrawn.

=== Guest appearances ===
- James Arnold Taylor as Obi-Wan Kenobi, a Jedi Master. Appears as a message on the holocron.
- Anthony Daniels as C-3PO, a protocol droid who assists allies in the rebellion.
- Greg Ellis as Valen Rudor, a TIE fighter pilot from Corulag in service to the Galactic Empire on Lothal.
- Bryton James as Zare Leonis, an Imperial cadet at the Academy for Young Imperials on the planet Lothal who worked as a spy for the rebels.
- Peter MacNicol as Tseebo, a Rodian who worked for the Imperial Information Office on Lothal.
- Frank Oz as Yoda, the wise and powerful Grand Master of the Jedi who is exiled on the planet Dagobah.
- Billy Dee Williams as Lando Calrissian, a smuggler in the underworld.
- James Hong as Azmorigan, a Jablogian crime lord whom the Ghost crew encounter while working with other smugglers.
- Derek Partridge as Brom Titus, an imperial officer male who served as an admiral and later as a commander in the Galactic Empire's navy.
- Julie Dolan as Princess Leia Organa, the princess of the planet Alderaan, Bail Organa's adopted daughter, and rebel.
- Robin Atkin Downes as Cham Syndulla, Hera's father who in the aftermath of the Clone Wars, opposes the newly established Galactic Empire's occupation of his world.
- Corey Burton as
  - Gobi Glie, a Twi'lek rebel, Cham Syndulla's right hand.
  - Quarrie, a Mon Calamari who built a prototype B-wing starfighter on the remote planet Shantipole.
- Catherine Taber as Numa, a Twi'lek rebel under the command of Cham Syndulla.
- Grey DeLisle as Chava the Wise, a Lasat mystic who survived the fall of Lasan at the hands of the Galactic Empire.
- Gary Anthony Williams as Gron, a Lasat member of the Lasan High Honor Guard who survived the fall of Lasan at the hands of the Galactic Empire.
- Fred Tatasciore as Yushyn, a Moyn who worked as the boss of a Mining Guild Asteroid Belt Gas Refinery.
- Robbie Daymond as the Eighth Brother, a Terrellian Inquisitor sent to hunt down Maul.
- Trevor Devall as Derek "Hobbie" Klivian, a former Imperial TIE fighter pilot, who defects to the rebellion.
- André Sogliuzzo as Slavin, an Imperial officer who served as a captain during the Imperial occupation of Ryloth.
- Gregg Berger as General Kalani, a super tactical droid who leads a still-active, but depleted, army of Separatist Battle Droids and Droidekas on Agamar.
- Matthew Wood as battle droids.
- Ray Stevenson as Gar Saxon, the Imperial Viceroy of Mandalore, having been appointed as a figurehead leader by the Empire, and the leader of the Imperial Super Commandos.
- Meredith Anne Bull as Gooti Terez, a Theelin who served as member of Iron Squadron.
- Eric Lopez as Jonner Jin, a human who served as member of Iron Squadron.
- Tom Kane as Wullf Yularen, an admiral during the Clone Wars, becoming a colonel in the Imperial Security Bureau.
- Josh Brener as Erskin Semaj, a commander who served as an aide to Senator Mon Mothma in the rebellion and later served in the Alliance to Restore the Republic.
- Yuri Lowenthal as Jon "Dutch" Vander, an ace pilot, served as the leader of Gold Squadron, a squadron made up of BTL Y-wing light bombers, with the rank of captain.
- Josh Gad as LT-319, a controller and officer that served in the Galactic Empire's Information Office.
- Katee Sackhoff as Bo-Katan Kryze, a regent of Mandalore, former member of the Mandalorian group known as Death Watch during the Clone Wars, opposing the ideals of her sister Duchess Satine under Pre Vizsla until he was usurped by Darth Maul and forming the Nite Owls to oppose him.
- Cary-Hiroyuki Tagawa as Alrich Wren, Sabine's father.
- Tobias Menzies as Tiber Saxon, a Mandalorian who served as the governor of Mandalore following the death of his brother, Viceroy Gar Saxon.
- Andrew Kishino as Hark, a Mandalorian who served as a captain in the Imperial Super Commandos.
- Seth Green as Seevor, a male Trandoshan who worked for the Mining Guild.
- Malcolm McDowell as Veris Hydan, an adviser with the title of minister who served the Galactic Emperor Palpatine.

== Episodes ==
Season	Episodes	Originally released	
Season	Episodes	First released	Last released
Shorts	4	August 11, 2014	September 1, 2014
1	15	October 3, 2014	March 2, 2015
2	22	June 20, 2015	March 30, 2016
3	22	September 24, 2016	March 25, 2017
4	16	October 16, 2017	March 5, 2018

== Production ==
The series was announced in May 2013, with a one-hour special set to debut in fall 2014 before airing as a full series on Disney XD. The announcement came two months after the cancellation of Star Wars: The Clone Wars. Simon Kinberg, Dave Filoni and Greg Weisman were announced as executive producers.

Concept art from the series, including a first look at the Ghost, was shown at the Star Wars Celebration that July. In September 2013, The Hollywood Reporter reported that Freddie Prinze Jr., Vanessa Marshall, Taylor Gray and David Oyelowo were being cast as the series leads.

At the 2013 New York Comic Con, it was revealed that the series would take place 14 years after Revenge of the Sith and 5 years before A New Hope. An image of the Inquisitor, the main villain of the series, was shown at the convention.

In its April 2014 announcement of the Star Wars Legends decision, Lucasfilm explained that Star Wars Rebels would be part of the new Star Wars canon and would incorporate elements introduced in Legends, such as the Inquisitor, the Imperial Security Bureau and Sienar Fleet Systems.

== Release ==
=== Broadcast ===
The first two episodes, titled Spark of Rebellion, premiered on October 3, 2014, on Disney Channels worldwide and on Family Channel in Canada. In Australia, the series premiered on October 17 on Disney XD. The Siege of Lothal premiered on June 28, 2015, and the second season debuted on October 18. In Canada, the series premiered on October 19 on the DHX-owned Disney XD. However, due to DHX Media losing the rights to Disney content, the show was later moved to Disney Channel. The second season premiered on November 7, and it was moved to the Corus-owned Disney XD channel on December 1.

In the Middle East and Africa, Spark of Rebellion premiered on October 11 and the series debuted on October 18 on Disney XD. Siege of Lothal premiered on October 10, followed the official season premiere on October 17. In Southeast Asia, Spark of Rebellion premiered on Disney XD on October 4 and the series officially started on November 29. Siege of Lothal premiered on October 3 on Disney XD and Disney Channel, and the second season was released on October 24. In the United Kingdom and Ireland, the series debuted on October 16 on Disney XD. Siege of Lothal premiered on July 18, 2015, followed by the second-season debut on October 17.

=== Home media ===
DVD/Blu-ray name	DVD Releases			Blu-ray Releases	
DVD/Blu-ray name	Region 1	Region 2	Region 4	Region A	Region B
Spark of Rebellion (DVD only)	October 14, 2014	October 13, 2014	November 5, 2014	Spark of Rebellion included in Complete Season One	
Complete Season One	September 1, 2015	September 14, 2015	September 16, 2015	September 1, 2015	September 14, 2015
Complete Season Two	August 30, 2016	October 3, 2016	November 2, 2016	August 30, 2016	October 3, 2016
Trials of the Darksaber (DVD only)	January 21, 2017	January 22, 2017	January 23, 2017	February 9, 2017	February 10, 2017
Legacy of Mandalore (DVD only)	February 18, 2017	February 19, 2017	February 20, 2017	March 9, 2017	March 12, 2017
Complete Season Three	August 29, 2017	October 2, 2017	December 6, 2017	August 29, 2017	October 2, 2017
Complete Season Four	August 12, 2018	October 26, 2018	November 28, 2018	August 12, 2018	October 26, 2018

Star Wars Rebels: Spark of Rebellion was released by Walt Disney Studios Home Entertainment on DVD in the US at all retailers on October 14, 2014. DVD bonus features include character shorts, a 3D model kit of the Ghost ship, and a preview of season 1.

The Complete Season One of Star Wars Rebels was released by Walt Disney Studios Home Entertainment on DVD and Blu-ray on September 1, 2015, in America, and in Germany on September 10, 2015. The Season 1 collection contains the expanded version of Spark of Rebellion with the Darth Vader/Grand Inquisitor prologue shown on ABC-TV. The Complete Season Two of Star Wars Rebels was released by Walt Disney Studios Home Entertainment on DVD and Blu-ray on August 30, 2016, in North America. The Complete Season Three of Star Wars Rebels was released on DVD and Blu-Ray on August 29, 2017. The Complete Season Four is announced to be released on DVD and Blu-ray on November 15, 2018, in Germany, and July 31, 2018, in the United States.

The series is also available on the Disney+ streaming service, which launched on November 12, 2019.

== Reception ==
=== Ratings ===
In the United States, the one-hour special garnered 2.74 million viewers on Disney Channel and 2.40 million viewers on ABC (excluding Boston, whose local station WCVB preempted it for a Steve Harvey special). Worldwide, it delivered a total of 6.5 million viewers. On Disney Channel, the first and second episodes delivered 2.33 million and 1.92 million viewers, respectively. The third and fourth episodes garnered 2.32 million and 1.84 million, respectively. The fifth, sixth and seventh episodes were watched by 1.43 million, 1.30 million and 1.60 million viewers, respectively. The eighth and ninth episodes got 1.92 and 1.44 million viewers, respectively.

In Canada, the second episode was watched by 274,500 viewers, making it the most-watched broadcast ever on the network. In the United Kingdom, the film was the highest-rated broadcast that week, with 81,000 viewers.

Season	Timeslot (ET)	Episodes	Premiered		Ended		Viewers (in millions)
Season	Timeslot (ET)	Episodes	Date	Premiere viewers (in millions)	Date	Finale viewers (in millions)	Viewers (in millions)
1	Mondays 9pm/8c	13	October 13, 2014	1.03	March 2, 2015	0.72	0.68
2	Wednesdays 9:30pm/8:30c (10/14/15–12/09/15) Wednesdays 9pm/8c (1/20/16–3/30/16)	22	October 14, 2015	0.46	March 30, 2016	0.69	0.81
3	Saturdays 9pm/8c	22	September 24, 2016	0.56	March 25, 2017	0.50	0.66

=== Critical response ===
On the review aggregation website Rotten Tomatoes, the first season has received a 92% positive score, based on 13 reviews with an average rating of 8.20/10, the website's critics consensus reads, "Rebels adds new dimension to an unexplored sector of the Star Wars timeline, inserting a ragtag group of lovable characters into a galactic adventure that all ages can enjoy." Seasons 2 and 3 have received a 100% score based on 6 reviews for season 2 and 6 reviews for season 3, with an average rating of 7.40/10 for season 2 and 9/10 for season 3. Season 4 has received a 100% score based on 10 reviews with an average rating of 9.20/10, the website's critics consensus reads, "The Force is with these Rebels in a thrilling conclusion that plays to its characters' strengths while serving up plenty of galactic spectacle." On Metacritic, the first season has a weighted average score of 78 out of 100 based on 4 critics, indicating "generally favorable reviews".

IGN and Variety in particular had strong praise for the pilot film, Spark of Rebellion, with their only criticism being the appearance of the Wookiees in the film, being cited as not all that impressive compared to the rest of the animation. SyFy Wire calls the series "Pure fun", further stating that it "captures the awe and joy of A New Hope" and is "thematically ambitious" with a "dramatic edge". Emily Ashby of Common Sense Media called the series "exciting" with cartoon violence and "positive messages." Ashby also argued that the series has a "broad appeal for kids and adults" particularly those interested in Star Wars. Graeme Virtue of The Guardian wrote that the series was inspired by the television Space Western Firefly.

=== Accolades ===
Award	Category	Recipient	Result
2015 Teen Choice Awards	Choice TV: Animated Show	Star Wars Rebels	Nominated
42nd Annie Awards	Outstanding Achievement, Storyboarding in an Animated TV/Broadcast Production	Nathaniel Villanueva & Douglas Lovelace	Nominated
5th Critics' Choice Television Awards	Best Animated Series	Star Wars Rebels	Nominated
2014 BTVA Awards	Best Male Lead Vocal Performance in a Television Series – Action/Drama	Steve Blum as Zeb Orrelios	Nominated
2014 BTVA Awards	Best Female Lead Vocal Performance in a Television Series – Action/Drama	Tiya Sircar as Sabine Wren	Nominated
2014 BTVA Awards	Best Female Lead Vocal Performance in a Television Series – Action/Drama	Vanessa Marshall as Hera Syndulla	Nominated
2014 BTVA Awards	Best Male Vocal Performance in a Television Series in a Supporting Role – Action/Drama	Jason Isaacs as The Inquisitor	Won
2014 BTVA Awards	Best Female Vocal Performance in a Television Series in a Supporting Role – Action/Drama	Kath Soucie as Maketh Tua	Nominated
2014 BTVA Awards	Best Male Vocal Performance in a Television Series in a Guest Role – Action/Drama	Frank Oz as Yoda	Nominated
2014 BTVA Awards	Best Male Vocal Performance in a Television Series in a Guest Role – Action/Drama	James Arnold Taylor as Obi-Wan Kenobi	Nominated
2014 BTVA Awards	Best Male Vocal Performance in a Television Series in a Guest Role – Action/Drama	James Earl Jones as Darth Vader	Won
2014 BTVA Awards	Best Vocal Ensemble in a New Television Series	Star Wars Rebels	Nominated
6th Critics' Choice Television Awards	Best Animated Series	Star Wars Rebels	Nominated
2015 BTVA Awards	Best Female Lead Vocal Performance in a Television Series – Action/Drama	Vanessa Marshall as Hera Syndulla	Nominated
44th Annie Awards	Outstanding Achievement, Music in an Animated TV/Broadcast Production	Kevin Kiner for Twilight of the Apprentice	Nominated
44th Annie Awards	Outstanding Achievement, Voice Acting in an Animated TV/Broadcast Production	Lars Mikkelsen as Grand Admiral Thrawn in Hera's Heroes	Nominated
44th Annie Awards	Outstanding Achievement, Editorial in an Animated TV/Broadcast Production	Joe E. Elwood and Alex McDonnell for Twilight of the Apprentice	Nominated
Writers Guild of America Awards 2016	Best Writing in Animation	Steven Melching for "A Princess on Lothal"	Nominated
2016 BTVA Awards	Best Male Vocal Performance in a Television Series in a Supporting Role	David Oyelowo as Agent Kallus	Nominated
2016 BTVA Awards	Best Male Vocal Performance in a Television Series in a Supporting Role	Lars Mikkelsen as Grand Admiral Thrawn	Nominated
43rd Saturn Awards	Best Animated Series or Film on Television	Star Wars Rebels	Won
69th Primetime Creative Arts Emmy Awards	Outstanding Children's Program	Star Wars Rebels	Nominated
2017 BTVA Awards	Best Vocal Ensemble in a Television Series	Star Wars Rebels	Nominated
2017 BTVA Awards	Best Male Vocal Performance in a Television Series in a Guest Role	Stephen Stanton as Obi-Wan Kenobi	Won
2017 BTVA Awards	Best Female Vocal Performance in a Television Series in a Supporting Role	Genevieve O'Reilly as Mon Mothma	Nominated
44th Saturn Awards	Best Animated Series or Film on Television	Star Wars Rebels	Won
70th Primetime Creative Arts Emmy Awards	Outstanding Children's Program	Star Wars Rebels	Nominated
70th Primetime Creative Arts Emmy Awards	Outstanding Music Composition for a Series (Original Dramatic Score)	Kevin Kiner for "Family Reunion – and Farewell"	Nominated
70th Primetime Creative Arts Emmy Awards	Outstanding Sound Editing for a Comedy or Drama Series (Half-Hour) and Animation	Matthew Wood, David Acord, Bonnie Wild, Sean Kiner, Ronni Brown, Margie O'Malley for "A World Between Worlds"	Nominated

== Other media ==
=== Live-action ===
==== Films ====
Chopper and the Ghost appear in the 2016 film Rogue One: A Star Wars Story, and Hera's surname is called on a loudspeaker at the Rebel base on Yavin IV, where Chopper can briefly be seen. In addition, the Ghost takes part in the climactic battle over Scarif.

The Ghost also appears in the 2019 film Star Wars: The Rise of Skywalker during the final battle over Exegol. The voice of Freddie Prinze Jr. as Kanan Jarrus can also be heard in the film as one of the voices of Jedi past who provide Rey with encouragement to defeat Emperor Palpatine.

==== Television series ====
The Grand Inquisitor and Fifth Brother appear in Obi-Wan Kenobi, portrayed by Rupert Friend and Sung Kang, respectively.

The Purrgil appear in The Mandalorian season 3 episode "Chapter 17: The Apostate". Zeb makes his live action debut in season three episode, "Chapter 21: The Pirate", voiced again by Steven Blum.

Sabine Wren, Ezra Bridger, and Hera Syndulla made their live-action debut in the series Ahsoka, portrayed by Natasha Liu Bordizzo, Eman Esfandi, and Mary Elizabeth Winstead, respectively. Dave Filoni and Lars Mikkelsen reprise their roles as Chopper and Grand Admiral Thrawn. Clancy Brown reprises his role as Ryder Azadi, the governor of Lothal. Vinny Thomas appears as Jai Kell, who was previously voiced by Dante Basco. Evan Whitten appears as Jacen Syndulla: Hera and Kanan Jarrus's son. Temuera Morrison appears as Rex in the fifth episode in flashbacks.

Erskin Semaj made his live-action debut in the series Andor, portrayed by Pierro Niel-Mee. The Andor episode "Welcome to the Rebellion" directly precedes and alludes to the events of the Rebels episode "Secret Cargo."

=== Animation television series ===
Ray Stevenson and Sharmila Devar reprise their roles as Gar Saxon and Ursa Wren, respectively in the seventh season of Star Wars: The Clone Wars. Freddie Prinze Jr. and Vanessa Marshall reprise their roles as younger versions of Kanan Jarrus (then still going by his original name, Caleb Dume) and Hera Syndulla in three episodes of Star Wars: The Bad Batch, with the former also making brief non-speaking cameo appearances in the seventh season of The Clone Wars and the series Tales of the Jedi. The Grand Inquisitor also appeared in the fourth episode of its sequel, Tales of the Empire, with Jason Isaacs reprising his role as the character.

=== Literature ===
==== Novels ====
On August 5, 2014, a junior novel called Ezra's Gamble was published by Disney–Lucasfilm Press (written by Ryder Windham and set shortly before the animated series Star Wars Rebels).

On September 2, 2014, Del Rey Books published Star Wars: A New Dawn, a prequel novel by John Jackson Miller telling the story of how Kanan and Hera met (set about six years before the series). One of the first canon Star Wars novels to be released by Disney Publishing Worldwide and Del Rey Books, It includes a foreword by Dave Filoni.

In the years 2014-2015 a tie-in novel series called Servants of the Empire was published by Disney–Lucasfilm Press (written by Jason Fry).

In 2017, a new novel, entitled Thrawn, was released. The book marked the entrance of Grand Admiral Thrawn into the current canon. It was written by the character's original creator, Timothy Zahn. A sequel to Thrawn, titled Thrawn: Alliances, was released on July 24, 2018. It explored Thrawn's partnerships with Darth Vader and Anakin Skywalker. Another Thrawn novel, Thrawn: Treason was released on July 23, 2019. It takes place during the events of Star Wars Rebels' fourth season.

Hera Syndulla would go on to appear in Alexander Freed's Star Wars: Alphabet Squadron novel trilogy, as a general of the recently christened New Republic's eponymous starfighter squadron in the final days of the Galactic Civil War, hunting down the weakened Imperial forces after the battle of Endor and the death of Emperor Palpatine.

==== Comics ====
From April 1, 2015, through March 16, 2016, Marvel Comics published a 12-issue comic series, titled Kanan, and set during the events of the first season. Written by former executive producer of the series Greg Weisman and illustrated by Pepe Larraz, Jacopo Camagni and Andrea Broccardo, the story is centered on Kanan having flashbacks to his days as a Padawan in the Jedi Temple and the Clone Wars. The other members of the Ghost crew also appear.

In the summer of 2017, Marvel announced that a comic book miniseries adaptation of Zahn's Thrawn novel was being planned, scheduled to be released in early 2018. The first issue was released on February 14, 2018, with new issues being released over the following five months.

A few days after the series finale was aired, IDW Publishing released the seventh issue of the long-running Star Wars Adventures multi-era comic book series, which contained the first of a two-part comic arc, set between the second and third season, in which the Spectres embark on a mission to save a rare endangered bird from Imperial custody. The second part appeared in the next issue, which was released on March 28, 2018.

=== Video games ===
A side-scrolling run-and-gun game based on the show's first season, titled Star Wars Rebels: Recon Missions, was released by Disney Mobile on iOS, Android and Windows Store in early 2015, before being discontinued on July 28, 2016, due to the limitations of the support team. Ezra Bridger is the only playable character, with other characters available via in-app purchases, which also grant early access to most of the game's levels in the mobile versions and are required to play the full campaign in the Windows Store version. Disney's online game Club Penguin hosted a special Star Wars Rebels event from January 22 to February 4, 2015.

Additionally, several of the characters from the series are playable in other games such as Disney Infinity 3.0, Angry Birds Star Wars II, Roblox (as virtual accessories and gears), Lego Star Wars: The Force Awakens and The Skywalker Saga (as downloadable content only), Star Wars: Galactic Defense, Star Wars: Force Arena and Star Wars: Galaxy of Heroes. Maul as he appeared in this series is also an unlockable skin for the Darth Maul hero character in the 2017 video game Star Wars: Battlefront II, developed by EA Motive.

Vanessa Marshall reprised her role as Hera Syndulla for the 2020 video game Star Wars: Squadrons, providing voice work and motion capture for the character.

== Themes ==
=== Historical influences ===
Characters in Star Wars Rebels have taken influence from Biblical, Hebrew, and Greco-Roman mythological names. Star Wars writers have often used biblical names for Jedi while giving galactic Imperial characters Roman names. In 2015 an interview was conducted with Dave Filoni and Simon Kinberg where Kinsberg stated that they wanted to connect to the original films by using the biblical naming scheme seen in the films. Both Caleb and Ezra are historically Hebrew names, with Ezra translating to "helper". Characters with Roman names include Clone Captain Rex which translates to "King" in Latin (although that character was created for The Clone Wars) along with Sabine Wren, Admiral Brom Titus and Admiral Kassius Konstantine.

== See also ==
- 2015 in science fiction
