= List of Star Wars Rebels characters =

Star Wars Rebels (2014–2018) is an American 3D CGI animated television series produced by Lucasfilm Animation. The series follows a motley group of rebels conducting covert operations to thwart the sinister Galactic Empire, including Kanan Jarrus, Hera Syndulla, Ezra Bridger, Zeb Orrellios, Chopper, and Sabine Wren. The 2023 live-action series Ahsoka serves as a direct continuation of Rebels, following on from the events of its series finale.

== Overview ==
Starring
No appearances

Note: Only characters appearing over multiple seasons appear in this list.

Character	Star Wars Rebels				Ahsoka	
Character	Season 1	Season 2	Season 3	Season 4	Season 1	Season 2
Character	2014–2015	2015–2016	2016–2017	2017–2018	2023	2027
=== Main cast ===
Ezra Bridger	Taylor Gray	Taylor Gray	Taylor Gray	Taylor Gray	Eman Esfandi	Eman Esfandi
Kanan Jarrus	Freddie Prinze Jr.	Freddie Prinze Jr.	Freddie Prinze Jr.	Freddie Prinze Jr.	Photograph	
Hera Syndulla	Vanessa Marshall	Vanessa Marshall	Vanessa Marshall	Vanessa Marshall	Mary Elizabeth Winstead	Mary Elizabeth Winstead
Sabine Wren	Tiya Sircar	Tiya Sircar	Tiya Sircar	Tiya Sircar	Natasha Liu Bordizzo	Natasha Liu Bordizzo
Garazeb "Zeb" Orrelios	Steve Blum	Steve Blum	Steve Blum	Steve Blum	Photograph	Steve Blum
C1-10P "Chopper"	Dave Filoni (Note: Credited as "Himself" prior to the series finale.)	Dave Filoni	Dave Filoni	Dave Filoni	Dave Filoni	Dave Filoni
Captain Rex		Dee Bradley Baker	Dee Bradley Baker	Dee Bradley Baker	Temuera Morrison	
Grand Admiral Thrawn			Lars Mikkelsen	Lars Mikkelsen	Lars Mikkelsen	Lars Mikkelsen
Ahsoka Tano	Ashley Eckstein	Ashley Eckstein		Ashley Eckstein	Rosario Dawson	Rosario Dawson
Ahsoka Tano	Ashley Eckstein	Ashley Eckstein		Ashley Eckstein	Ariana Greenblatt	Ariana Greenblatt
Baylan Skoll					Ray Stevenson	Rory McCann
Shin Hati					Ivanna Sakhno	Ivanna Sakhno
Morgan Elsbeth					Diana Lee Inosanto	
Huyang					David Tennant	David Tennant
Jacen Syndulla				No voice actor	Evan Whitten	TBA
Mon Mothma			Genevieve O'Reilly	Genevieve O'Reilly	Genevieve O'Reilly	TBA
Darth Vader Anakin Skywalker	James Earl Jones (Note: Ben Burtt provided breaths.)	James Earl Jones		James Earl Jones (Note: Via original recordings.)	Hayden Christensen	Hayden Christensen
Darth Vader Anakin Skywalker		Matt Lanter		Hayden Christensen Matt Lanter	Hayden Christensen	Hayden Christensen
C-3PO	Anthony Daniels				Anthony Daniels	TBA
=== Rebel Alliance / New Republic ===
Obi-Wan "Ben" Kenobi	James Arnold Taylor (Note: As the young Obi-Wan Kenobi.)		James Arnold Taylor Stephen Stanton (Note: Voicematching Alec Guinness as the older "Ben Kenobi".)	James Arnold Taylor Stephen Stanton Alec Guinness		
Cikatro Vizago	Keith Szarabajka	Keith Szarabajka		Keith Szarabajka		
Yoda	Frank Oz	Frank Oz		Frank Oz		
Bail Organa	Phil LaMarr		Phil LaMarr	Phil LaMarr		
Jai Kell	Dante Basco			Dante Basco	Vinny Thomas	TBA
Commander Jun Sato		Keone Young	Keone Young			
Captain Gregor Commander Wolffe		Dee Bradley Baker		Dee Bradley Baker		
Hondo Ohnaka		Jim Cummings	Jim Cummings	Jim Cummings		
Ketsu Onyo		Gina Torres		Gina Torres		
Ryder Azadi		Clancy Brown	Clancy Brown	Clancy Brown	Clancy Brown	TBA
Fenn Rau		Kevin McKidd	Kevin McKidd	Kevin McKidd		
Cham Syndulla		Robin Atkin Downes	Robin Atkin Downes			
Numa		Catherine Taber	Catherine Taber			
AP-5		Stephen Stanton	Stephen Stanton	Stephen Stanton		
Wedge Antilles			Nathan Kress	Nathan Kress		
Mart Mattin			Zachary Gordon	Zachary Gordon		
Saw Gerrera			Forest Whitaker	Forest Whitaker		
Ursa Wren			Sharmila Devar	Sharmila Devar		
Tristan Wren			Ritesh Rajan	Ritesh Rajan		
Jan Dodonna			Michael Bell	Michael Bell		
Hamato Xiono					Nelson Lee	Nelson Lee
=== Galactic Empire ===
Agent Kallus	David Oyelowo	David Oyelowo	David Oyelowo	David Oyelowo		
The Grand Inquisitor	Jason Isaacs	Jason Isaacs				
Minister Maketh Tua	Kath Soucie	Kath Soucie				
Admiral Kassius Konstantine	Dee Bradley Baker	Dee Bradley Baker	Dee Bradley Baker			
Grand Moff Tarkin	Stephen Stanton		Stephen Stanton	Stephen Stanton		
Emperor Palpatine / Darth Sidious		Sam Witwer (Note: Before 2019, Witwer was the original voice actor for Emperor Palpatine in season two, before his lines were redubbed by Ian McDiarmid.)		Ian McDiarmid		
Governor Arihnda Pryce			Mary Elizabeth McGlynn	Mary Elizabeth McGlynn		
Captain Enoch					Wes Chatham	Wes Chatham

== Main characters ==
=== Ezra Bridger ===
Ezra Bridger (voiced by Taylor Gray), call sign Spectre 6, is a teenaged human street urchin and con-artist with Force abilities, whose parents were imprisoned by Imperial forces. The episode "Empire Day" reveals he was born the same day Palpatine inaugurated the Galactic Empire.

At the start of the series, his main motivation is to find his parents. In the pilot episode the Jedi Padawan Kanan Jarrus decides to take him as his apprentice. In "Path of the Jedi", Ezra is formally inducted into the Jedi Order, when Yoda's voice helps him to find a kyber crystal to create his first lightsaber, which after being constructed, is blue and features a built-in stun blaster patterned after his street urchin trademark weapon, an energy slingshot. In the second-season episode "Legacy", he discovers that his parents were killed in a prison revolt. In "Shroud of Darkness" it is revealed Kanan fears Ezra might turn to the dark side, which partially happens when the former Sith Lord Maul draws him closer in "Twilight of the Apprentice", and in further episodes also keeps calling him "apprentice", showing a marked interest in him. His first lightsaber is also destroyed by Darth Vader. In the season 3 premiere episode "Steps Into Shadow", Ezra replaces it with a green-bladed lightsaber. In the same episode, Ezra is promoted to the rank of Lieutenant Commander of the Phoenix Squadron, and also assumes field leadership of the Ghost crew, due to Kanan's blindness preventing him from continuing the role. However, due to his reckless leadership at the time, he was suspended from command as Lieutenant Commander until further notice. The episodes "Shroud of Darkness", "The Holocrons of Fate" and "Twin Suns" reveal Ezra's main motivation of the third season, to "find the key to destroying the Sith", who he interprets as the exiled Jedi Master Obi-Wan Kenobi. After eventually finding and talking to Kenobi however, Ezra realized his true mission is to be with the other rebels and help them fight against the Empire. During the season 3 finale, by taking command of a squad during the battle against Grand Admiral Thrawn's fleet, it shows that at this point, Ezra's status as Lieutenant Commander has been fully restored.

Ezra becomes somewhat lost after the death of his master Kanan, but begins to understand Kanan's final lessons after he penetrates the Jedi Temple in "A World Between Worlds". His connection to the Force-sensitive creatures of Lothal increases, and in the penultimate episode "A Fool's Hope" and the one-hour series finale "Family Reunion – and Farewell" (both of which aired March 5, 2018), Ezra summons both the Loth-Wolves and the Purrgil to defeat Thrawn, Pryce, and the Imperial forces on Lothal. Because the Purrgil have shattered the bridge observation ports on Thrawn's Star Destroyer, onto which he has been taken, Ezra uses the Force to create a protecting air pocket for himself and Thrawn, and deliberately and selflessly allows himself to be taken away with Thrawn by the Purrgil.

On his character, Gray stated: "He's a pickpocket, he's a little thief. But he's doing it all because he needs to survive". Executive producer Greg Weisman said: "We see this whole series very much through Ezra's eyes. As his eyes get opened to what the Empire's capable of, his eyes are opened to the fact that there are people who care, who are trying to fight the good fight, and he becomes one of them."

The character made his live-action debut in the series Ahsoka (2023), portrayed by Eman Esfandi, in which he depicted as having been living in another galaxy on the same planet as Thrawn for over a decade.

=== Kanan Jarrus ===
Kanan Jarrus (voiced by Freddie Prinze, Jr.), call sign Spectre 1, is one of the last surviving Jedi of the fallen Republic whose real name is Caleb Dume. The episode "Legacy" reveals that Kanan entered the Jedi Order before getting to know his parents. The comic Star Wars: Kanan explores how before the events of Rebels, Caleb Dume is a human Jedi Padawan student of Jedi Master Depa Billaba, until Order 66 made the clone troopers betray and kill the Jedi Order, including Kanan's Master.

During the Dark Times, Caleb is forced to take the identity of Kanan instead of his real name, in order to hide his Jedi heritage to survive, as explored in the book Star Wars: A New Dawn which also explains how he met Hera Syndulla a few years before the events in Rebels. At the beginning of Rebels, Kanan is the co-leader of the Ghost crew with Hera. Despite Kanan having not finished his own Jedi training himself, after seeing the potential in Ezra Bridger, he decides to take him as his Jedi Padawan. In "The Lost Commanders" he initially finds it difficult to trust Captain Rex, due to having experienced Order 66. In "Shroud of Darkness", Kanan was promoted to the rank of Jedi Knight by a vision within a Jedi Temple on the planet Lothal. In the episode "Twilight of the Apprentice" after visiting the planet Malachor, Kanan is blinded by Maul. While still part of the missions and his Force abilities compensating for his acquired handicap, he is from then on forced to take a less active role as a leader. Season 4 confirmed Kanan and Hera as a romantic couple.

In the episode "Jedi Night", Kanan sacrifices himself while rescuing Hera from being killed by Governor Pryce in the year 0BBY. In the following episode "DUME", Ezra has a vision of a giant Loth-Wolf with a white trident-shaped mark on its forehead that introduced itself as Dume (voiced by "The Force"). Dume directs Ezra into traveling to the Lothal Temple with the surviving Ghost crew. The wolf is later assumed by Ahsoka in the episode "A World Between Worlds" as an extension of Kanan's will through the cosmic Force into the Loth-Wolves to teach Ezra a final lesson and prevent both the final and the most powerful secrets of the Lothal temple from being fully compromised. Sometime after his death and before the Battle of Endor, Hera gives birth to their son Jacen Syndulla.

Executive producer Dave Filoni describes the character as a "cowboy Jedi". Animation supervisor Keith Kellogg said: "He is a Jedi but he's not a Jedi in the traditional sense that we've had before on the show. He's a little more rough around the edges. He's kept his lightsaber locked away, so he hasn't used it in a long time." After being blinded, Kanan has been compared to the Star Wars Legends character Rahm Kota from Star Wars: The Force Unleashed, another Jedi who was blinded, which led Pablo Hidalgo from the Lucasfilm story group to say on Twitter, that both characters were inspired by Zatoichi.

=== Hera Syndulla ===
Hera Syndulla (voiced by Vanessa Marshall), call sign Spectre 2, is a Twi'lek from the planet Ryloth who is the owner and pilot of the Ghost. She is the daughter of Cham Syndulla, who appeared in the episode "Liberty on Ryloth" of Star Wars: The Clone Wars before reappearing on Rebels. She and Kanan share a strong connection; in season 4, they are confirmed to be lovers, and episode 15 introduces their son Jacen Syndulla. Hera has trained herself as a pilot of outstanding skill, known to some as "one of the best star pilots this side of the Outer Rim." commanding the respect of friends and foes alike. In "Wings of the Master", Hera was promoted to Captain of the Phoenix Squadron by Kanan's recommendation, and in "Rebel Assault" she has advanced in rank to General.

In the 2016 film Rogue One a voice is heard asking General Syndulla to report to a meeting in the Rebel Base of Yavin IV, confirming her rise to the rank of General. The Ghost is among the ships seen during the dogfight over the atmosphere of Scarif, but it is unknown if Hera was piloting her ship during such events, as Dave Filoni said: "I can imagine doing that entire [Scarif] battle from their point of view, whoever is on the Ghost at that point."

Hera also stars in the animated micro-series Star Wars Forces of Destiny, an animated short features Hera teaming up with Princess Leia, Han Solo and Ewoks, while on the forest moon of Endor. This was also confirmed in the 2018 series finale "Family Reunion – and Farewell", where it is revealed that she fought in the Battle of Endor and that she and Kanan have a son named Jacen Syndulla.

Hera reappears in the videogame Star Wars: Squadrons as the superior officer of former Imperial Captain Lindon Javes and Vanguard Squadron, overseeing the development of the first prototype of the Starhawk class of New Republic battleships some time after the Battle of Endor.

A younger Hera appears in Star Wars: The Bad Batch with Chopper in the episode "Devil's Deal". In this appearance, she has more of a French accent.

Hera returned in the 2023 series Ahsoka, portrayed by Mary Elizabeth Winstead.

Filoni has stated: "She is a very strong-minded character, kind of the heart of the group, keeps everyone together when they would otherwise fall apart".

=== Sabine Wren ===
Sabine Wren (voiced by Tiya Sircar), call sign Spectre 5, is a 16-year-old Mandalorian graffiti artist, Imperial Academy dropout and a former bounty hunter with expert knowledge of weapons and explosives. As a member of the Ghost crew, she acts as their chief engineer and cargo transport, weapons and demolitions expert, as well as their linguist, being fluent in a wide variety of languages. Originally a dedicated student and fledgling inventor for the Empire, she deserted when one of the weapons she had created was planned to be used against her own people.

In "The Protector of Concord Dawn", Sabine is revealed to come from House Vizsla, thus leading her to be related with Death Watch, a Mandalorian terrorist group in The Clone Wars. The episode "The Antilles Extraction" reveals she was the one who helped pilot Wedge Antilles defect from the Empire and join the Rebellion. The episode "Imperial Supercommandos" reveals her mother, Ursa Wren, is sided with the Empire. In "Visions and Voices", Sabine acquires the Darksaber, a weapon used by Death Watch and also by Darth Maul during the Clone Wars. In "Trials of the Darksaber", Sabine's past is fully revealed, and Kanan trains Sabine in lightsaber combat (Sabine does not use The Force). By the next episode, Sabine decides to stay with her family in order to help unite the clans against the Empire. Sabine returns to the group in "Zero Hour" when Grand Admiral Thrawn leads his forces to attack Atollon.

In the series finale epilogue, it is revealed that Sabine stayed on Lothal, living in Ezra's tower. Earlier in the episode, Ezra told her that "I can always count on you", which she took to mean that he needed her to stay on Lothal and protect his people; however, in the epilogue, she understands what Ezra really meant and joins Ahsoka Tano in finding him and bringing him home.

Sabine also stars in the animated micro-series Star Wars Forces of Destiny.

CG supervisor of lighting and FX Joel Aron said, "She's adding something that we haven't really seen before in the Star Wars universe. You have a character that is expressively creative through art—whether it's the color of her hair or what she's done to her armor." Her last image in the series finale is with deep purple hair cut short.

In November 2021, Deadline Hollywood announced that Natasha Liu Bordizzo had been cast to portray Sabine in live-action in the 2023 series Ahsoka.

=== Garazeb "Zeb" Orrelios ===
Garazeb Orrelios (voiced by Steven Blum), call sign Spectre 4, nicknamed "Zeb," is a Lasat who was the Captain of the Lasan High Honor Guard. His people were one of the first species to rise up against the Empire in its early days. The Imperial response was a genocide campaign against them. This near-extinction has left him with a gruff demeanor, but he has remained loyal to the struggle against the Empire, eventually to discover that his fellow Lasat still exist as a culture on their hidden homeworld of Lira San in the episode "Legends of the Lasat". In season 3, Zeb is revealed to have become Phoenix Squadron's Chief of Security, which was mentioned in the episode "Warhead".

Zeb is known for the frequent use of the Lasat expletive "Karabast!" as an expression of surprise or frustration. His common expletive was heard in the 2016 film Rogue One from the character Pao during the Battle of Scarif. The Ghost is among the ships seen during the dogfight over the atmosphere of Scarif, it is presumed Zeb was on board the ship along with Hera and Chopper as Dave Filoni said: "I can imagine doing that entire [Scarif] battle from their point of view, whoever is on the Ghost at that point." and all three heroes remained in the Rebellion until at least after the Battle of Endor.

His physical appearance is based on Ralph McQuarrie's original conceptual artwork for Chewbacca. Art director Kilian Plunkett said: "Zeb actually is very articulate and witty and funny, and that's sort of juxtaposed with what he looks like, makes for an interesting character".

In the series finale "Family Reunion – and Farewell", Zeb takes part in the final battle against Grand Admiral Thrawn and Governor Pryce on Lothal, where he engages in a second confrontation with Thrawn's Noghri assassin Rukh, which ends with him electrocuting the assassin as he traps him on to the coils of a shield generator conductor just before they were activated. Sometime after the Battle of Endor, Zeb brings Kallus to Lira San where the Lasat are currently living. He returns in the third season of The Mandalorian and its follow-up film The Mandalorian and Grogu, again voiced by Blum.

=== Chopper ===
C1-10P, nicknamed "Chopper" (voiced by Dave Filoni, credited as "Himself" prior to the series finale), call sign Spectre 3, is an irritable astromech droid owned by Hera, who recovered and reconstructed the droid after it crashed on Ryloth during the Clone Wars. The droid's nickname Chopper is derived from its name resembling the word "CHOP" when written out. Chopper has a psychopathic and bloodthirsty streak, having endangered and killed many droids and sentient beings over the course of the series. In the 2016 film Rogue One the character has a brief cameo moving around the Rebel Base on Yavin IV. In the episode "An Imperial Feast" from Star Wars Forces of Destiny, Chopper makes an appearance alongside Hera. Chopper appears in the epilogue of the series finale "Family Reunion – and Farewell" where he is seen aboard the Ghost with Hera and Kanan's son Jacen Syndulla. Chopper is a recurring character in Ahsoka season 1 confirming his survival into the New Republic era.

Chopper's design is heavily modeled on the original conceptual artwork for R2-D2. Describing the character, Filoni said, "He likes to do things the way that he wants, not necessarily the way the crew wants or as fast as the crew would like, but he gets the job done. He's incredibly loyal". Chopper is also summarized as, "If R2-D2 is your favorite dog, Chopper is the cat". For Chopper's live action cameo, Matt Martin, a member of Lucasfilm Story Group, served as the on-set operator of Chopper.

Chopper returned in the 2023 live-action series Ahsoka, again voiced by Filoni. Unlike in Rebels, Chopper's dialogue is less muffled, allowing everything he says to be audible.

== Members of the Rebel Alliance ==
The following are members of the Rebel Alliance:

=== Wedge Antilles ===
Wedge Antilles (voiced by Nathan Kress) is a former Imperial TIE fighter pilot turned Rebel pilot who appears throughout the original film trilogy. He encounters an undercover Sabine at the Imperial Pilot Academy and later defects along with his friend Hobbie to the Rebel Alliance.

=== Saw Gerrera ===
Saw Gerrera (voiced by Forest Whitaker, reprising his role from Rogue One) is the leader of a rebel cell who helped lead the resistance movement to victory over the Separatist occupation of the planet Onderon during the Clone Wars once trained by Padawan Ahsoka Tano, Jedi Knight Anakin Skywalker, Jedi Master Obi-Wan Kenobi and Clone Captain Rex. But liberation resulted in the death of Saw's sister Steela, and eventually Onderon was lost to the Empire, turning him into an extremist rebel. In the two-part episode "Ghosts of Geonosis", Saw is sent with a squad to Geonosis by the Rebellion to investigate the disappearance of the Geonosian race. After being rescued by the Ghost crew after his team was taken out by Separatist droids controlled by a frightened Geonosian survivor, he later set up his partisan cell and continued to investigate the nature of the super weapon the Empire created in secret.

=== Zare Leonis ===
Zare Leonis (voiced by Bryton James) is a cadet at the Imperial Academy, where his sister Dhara disappeared due to apparent Force-sensitivity. He stays in the academy as a spy in order to find her, as well as to feed information to the rebels, until he is himself taken by the Grand Inquisitor.

=== Mon Mothma ===
Mon Mothma (voiced by Genevieve O'Reilly, reprising her role from Episode III) is the former Senator of Chandrila in the Republic and later Imperial Senates. She defected from the Empire prior to the events of "Secret Cargo", after giving a speech condemning the false portrayal of the Ghorman Massacre and naming Emperor Palpatine culpable for genocide. She is pursued by Imperial forces with the Ghost crew and Gold Squadron providing an escort as she formally gathers the Rebel Alliance at Dantooine. She later speaks with Ezra in "Zero Hour" and she informs him that they are unable to send reinforcements to Atollon, as doing so would play into Grand Admiral Thrawn's hands.

=== Mart Mattin ===
Mart Mattin (voiced by Zachary Gordon) is a young human Rebel pilot who was in Hera Syndulla's fighter squad during their ultimately ill-fated attack on Lothal City's Imperial base in "Rebel Assault". He is the only other Rebel pilot besides Hera and Chopper to survive the battle and escape captivity, and is later on retrieved to join the Lothal Rebel cell in their guerilla fight against the Empire. Appearing mostly in cameo roles, he has a slightly expanded role in the series' finale when he implements a secret plan devised by Ezra Bridger to bring in a pod of Purrgil against Admiral Thrawn's fleet.

Mattin's name is a tuckerization of Matt Martin, a member of Lucasfilm Story Group.

=== Quarrie ===
Quarrie (voiced by Corey Burton) is a Mon Calamari engineer living on the planet Shantipole. He built the prototype B-wing, the Blade Wing, which was gifted to Hera in "Wings of the Master", and later oversaw the secret construction of more B-wings for the Rebel Alliance at Senator Organa's request.

He is named after Star Wars concept artist Ralph McQuarrie.

=== Commander Sato ===
Commander Jun Sato (voiced by Keone Young) is the leader of the Phoenix Squadron rebel cell. In "Zero Hour" Pt. 1 during the fight against Grand Admiral Thrawn's forces at Atollon, Commander Sato decides to open an escape corridor for Ezra by executing a kamikaze strike against an enemy vessel. With two volunteer crew members staying on board, Commander Sato leads them on a collision course against Admiral Konstantine's Interdictor cruiser, which kills the remaining crews of both ships.

=== AP-5 ===
AP-5 (voiced by Stephen Stanton) is a former Galactic Republic analyst droid and navigator during the Clone Wars, who was reduced to being an inventory droid on Imperial Cargo Transport 241. He sides with the Rebels and assists them in finding a suitable base after developing an unlikely friendship with Chopper. He was introduced in the episode “The Forgotten Droid” (S2E18).

=== Ahsoka Tano ===
Ahsoka Tano (voiced by Ashley Eckstein) is a Togruta and former Padawan of Anakin Skywalker who left the Order out of disillusionment with the Jedi Council for not defending her while on Republic trial for crimes she did not commit. Following the establishment of the Galactic Empire, having originally hid and crafted a pair of white lightsabers, Ahsoka became a key informant of Senator Organa under the codename "Fulcrum". Ahsoka relayed intelligence to the Lothal rebels prior to revealing herself to them in the season 1 finale "Fire Across the Galaxy". After her rebel cell Phoenix Squadron was nearly extinguished by Darth Vader in "The Siege of Lothal", she and her remaining followers join the Ghost. In "Shroud of Darkness", Ahsoka is forced to accept Darth Vader is her corrupted former master. In "Twilight of the Apprentice", Ahsoka takes Ezra and Kanan to Malachor to search for Sith knowledge. She later sacrifices herself to buy Ezra and Kanan some time to get away from Darth Vader, forcing him to fight her as the Sith temple collapses on top of them.

Ahsoka reappears in the fourth-season episode "A World Between Worlds", revealed to have been momentarily removed from time during the Sith temple's destruction when Ezra pulled her through a time-space doorway just as Vader was about to kill her, ending up in the void between time and space which Ezra entered through another portal at the Jedi temple on Lothal. She stops Ezra from an impulsive attempt to change fate by trying to save Kanan from his own demise, just as he had saved her, before the Emperor attacks them through the breach the Lothal portal has created. Promising Ezra to find him, Ahsoka escapes back through the Malachor portal, leading to the ambiguous end shown in "Twilight of the Apprentice", where she is seen walking away from the ruins of the Sith temple.

In the epilogue of the series finale "Family Reunion – and Farewell" which takes place after the Battle of Endor, she reappears again to join Sabine in searching the galaxy for Ezra.

Ahsoka reappeared in the second season of The Mandalorian, portrayed by Rosario Dawson.

=== Captain Rex ===
Captain Rex (CT-7567) (voiced by Dee Bradley Baker) is a Clone trooper captain who served under Anakin Skywalker in the Clone Wars. After the Clone Wars subsided and being one of the few to have not participated in Order 66, Rex and his fellow clones made their home in exile in the Outer Rim's planet Seelos, living in a still-operational six-legged AT-TE walker on Seelos' surface, before they are discovered by the Lothal Rebels and Rex agrees to aid the Rebel forces.

In the epilogue of the series finale "Family Reunion – and Farewell", it is revealed that he fought alongside Hera at the Battle of Endor.

=== Organa family ===
==== Bail Organa ====
Senator Bail Organa (voiced by Phil LaMarr) is the Senator of planet Alderaan, owner of the droids C-3PO and R2-D2, and secretly one of the leaders organizing the Rebel Alliance. After discreetly using the droids to inspect the Lothal rebel cell in the first episode "Droids in Distress", he sends a small fleet of frigates to aid the escape of the Lothal rebels in the season 1 finale, recruiting them to the greater rebellion. He periodically reappears to send supplies and give the Ghost crew missions. In "Twin Suns", it is revealed that he publicly confirmed the death of Jedi Master Obi-Wan Kenobi, though this was done to protect Kenobi's mission and location on Tatooine.

==== Princess Leia Organa ====
Princess Leia Organa (voiced by Julie Dolan in the second season and archival audio of Carrie Fisher in the fourth season) is the princess of the planet Alderaan, Bail Organa's adopted daughter, and (unbeknownst to both herself and the majority of the galaxy) Darth Vader's biological daughter.

Filoni stated: "One of the complex challenges of depicting Leia in Rebels is that we have to remind the audience that at this point she is part of the Empire. She does not believe in the Empire, but she is acting the part, almost a double agent."

==== R2-D2 and C-3PO ====
R2-D2 (voiced by Ben Burtt) is an astromech droid and C-3PO (voiced by Anthony Daniels) is a protocol droid built by Anakin Skywalker. During the series, both droids are owned by Bail Organa who has tasked R2-D2 with secret missions to undermine Imperial activities, appearing in "Droids in Distress". Prior to the rise of the Empire, both droids were owned by the deceased close friend of Bail Organa named Padmé Amidala.

== Members of the Galactic Empire ==
The following are members of the Galactic Empire:

=== Sith ===
==== Emperor Palpatine ====
Emperor Palpatine (voiced by Sam Witwer in the 'original' airing of Season two) / (Ian McDiarmid in Season four and then Season two as of 2019) is the Emperor of the Galactic Empire and Darth Vader's Sith Master Darth Sidious, having orchestrated his rise to power as Supreme Chancellor of the Galactic Republic along with engineering the Clone War and the removal of the Jedi Order once the war ends and he restructures the Republic into the Empire. After learning from Vader that Ahsoka Tano is among the rebel forces, Palpatine orders Vader to capture her as she may know the whereabouts of surviving Jedi while sending an Inquisitor after the Rebels. In "A World Between Worlds", he attempts to use Ezra to access the world between worlds to manipulate the Galaxy's timeline to his design. But he fails to catch Ezra as he closes the gateway.

In the series finale "Family Reunion – and Farewell", Emperor Palpatine uses a hologram masked in the image of his former self when Grand Admiral Thrawn brings Ezra to him. He attempts to tempt Ezra into reactivating what remained of the gate by presenting him the moment in time when Ezra's parents were still alive. But Ezra emotionally releases his parents and destroys the gate to Palpatine's dismay.

==== Darth Vader / Anakin Skywalker ====
Darth Vader (voiced by James Earl Jones and Ben Burtt as Darth Vader, Matt Lanter as Anakin Skywalker, archive audio of Hayden Christensen as Anakin Skywalker in the fourth season) is the Imperial army's cyborg Sith commander and a former Jedi corrupted by Emperor Palpatine.

He first appears in his second chronological appearance in "Fire Across the Galaxy" where he appears before Grand Moff Tarkin and Agent Kallus sometime after the Grand Inquisitor's death. He later appears in the season 2 premiere movie "The Siege of Lothal", after Tarkin requests assistance against the Jedi presence in the rebels. Vader then wipes out most of the rebel cell in the Lothal system, injures half the Ghost crew, destroys Ezra's home and a community of displaced people on Lothal and has Minister Tua murdered with the rebels blamed for the crime. After learning Ahsoka Tano—his former Jedi apprentice—is among the rebels, Vader is ordered by the Emperor to dispatch another Inquisitor to go after her in hopes of using her to find the remaining Jedi. Ahsoka later learns of Vader's identity through a vision in a Jedi temple on Lothal, where Vader arrives after it is claimed by the Inquisitors. He then journeys to Malachor and attempts to claim the ancient Sith weapon hidden there, only to face Ahsoka in battle after claiming to have destroyed Anakin. He later emerges alone from the ruins. In "Shroud of Darkness," he appears as his former self—Anakin Skywalker, hero of the Clone Wars and Ahsoka's former Jedi master—as both a vision to Ahsoka and a holographic recording providing lightsaber instructions, found within Kanan's holocron. Skywalker's voice is also heard briefly in a duel between Vader and Ahsoka in "Twilight of the Apprentice" after Ahsoka slices Vader's helmet open.

The character's first chronological appearance was the extended cold opening that was added to ABC's broadcast of "Spark of Rebellion" on October 26, 2014, where he orders the Grand Inquisitor through a communications hologram to hunt down the remaining Jedi and try to lure any Force-sensitive children they take as their Padawans. Filoni stated: "We wanted to do something special for the ABC broadcast. We've added a scene which gives audiences insight into the Inquisitor and includes a cameo by Darth Vader, voiced by the distinguished actor James Earl Jones."

=== Inquisitors ===
The Imperial Inquisitors are Force-sensitive "Dark Side Adepts" of the Galactic Empire, who are sanctioned by and answer only to Darth Vader and Emperor Palpatine. Highly skilled in assassination, espionage, interrogation, and target acquisition, their task is to hunt down the remaining Jedi as well as any children with Force potential. All of the Inquisitors are armed with gyroscopic double-bladed lightsabers, based on an unused concept from Star Wars: The Force Unleashed video game.

==== The Grand Inquisitor ====
The Grand Inquisitor (voiced by Jason Isaacs) is a Pau'an Inquisitor. The Grand Inquisitor first appeared in the extended cold opening of "Spark of Rebellion", where he is ordered by Darth Vader to hunt down any Jedi who survived Order 66 and lure to the dark side any Force-sensitive children the Jedi may have taken as Padawans or destroy them if they refuse. The Grand Inquisitor saw the opportunity to do so when called by Agent Kallus to help him hunt down the rebels after Kanan is revealed to be a Jedi. After being defeated by Kanan in "Fire Across the Galaxy", he kills himself by falling into an exploding reactor core. It is later stated by Dave Filoni that he did this because he was more afraid of facing Vader's punishment for his failure.

As the Seventh Sister revealed in "Always Two There Are", the Grand Inquisitor's death left an opening for the other Inquisitors to compete to take his place.

In "Shroud of Darkness", his spirit appears to Kanan in the temple on Lothal and reveals that he was once a member of the Temple Guard and thus, a fallen Jedi Knight. After testing Kanan and helping him realize that he cannot protect Ezra from everything, he dubs Kanan a Jedi Knight before calling upon other illusory Temple Guards to delay the Fifth Brother and Seventh Sister in their pursuit of Kanan, Ezra, and Ahsoka.

The character appeared in live-action form in the Disney+ series Obi Wan Kenobi, which is set 10 years after Revenge of the Sith, played by Rupert Friend.

==== The Fifth Brother ====
The Fifth Brother (voiced by Philip Anthony-Rodriguez) is an Inquisitor of an unknown species and the partner of the Seventh Sister. After "The Siege of Lothal", he is sent by Darth Vader under Emperor Palpatine's orders to hunt the rebels down after Ahsoka is discovered among them. He first appeared in "Relics of the Old Republic", where he meets with Admiral Konstantine telling him that he will finish the job that Admiral Konstantine and Agent Kallus had failed. In "Always Two There Are", the Fifth Brother and the Seventh Sister attack Ezra, Sabine, Zeb, and Chopper during their visit to an old base that was used during the Clone Wars. In "Twilight of the Apprentice", the Fifth Brother accompanies the Seventh Sister and the Eighth Brother as they follow Ezra, Kanan, and Ahsoka to Malachor. He is later killed by Maul.

The character made his live-action debut in the Disney+ series Obi-Wan Kenobi, portrayed by Sung Kang.

==== The Seventh Sister ====
The Seventh Sister (voiced by Sarah Michelle Gellar) is a Mirialan Inquisitor in a metal mask that covers her entire face-though the faceplate can be retracted-and the partner of the Fifth Brother, accompanied by miniature Probe Droids. She first appeared in "Always Two There Are", acting on her own to capture the crew of the Ghost with The Fifth Brother assisting her. In "Twilight of the Apprentice", the Seventh Sister accompanies the Fifth Brother and the Eighth Brother as they follow Ezra, Kanan, and Ahsoka to Malachor. She is later killed by Maul.

==== The Eighth Brother ====
The Eighth Brother (voiced by Robbie Daymond) is the fourth Inquisitor introduced in the series, a masked Terellian Jango Jumper who trailed the former Sith Lord Darth Maul to the planet Malachor. After briefly engaging Ahsoka and Kanan he was captured but managed to signal the Fifth Brother and Seventh Sister, who came to his aid only for all three to be driven off when Maul teamed up with the Jedi. The three later attacked the Jedi and Maul again during their bid to reach the top of a Sith temple containing a Holocron that would activate its superweapon mode, with the Eighth Brother demonstrating a new saw feature built into the Inquisitor lightsaber. However, the Eighth Brother's lightsaber was damaged during his battle with Kanan. He attempted to escape by spinning the lightsaber blades like helicopter rotors, but the maneuver failed and he fell to his death on the surface far below.

=== Grand Moff Tarkin ===
Wilhuff Tarkin (voiced by Stephen Stanton) is an Imperial Grand Moff and the Imperial Governor of the Outer Rim Territories, within which Lothal is located. When Kanan and his group become too powerful for Kallus and the Grand Inquisitor to defeat, he comes to Lothal to personally take charge. He is able to capture Kanan, but loses his Star Destroyer Sovereign against the Ghost's crew when they rescue Kanan. In season 2, when the Lothal authorities continue to prove ineffectual against the Rebels, he eventually brings in Darth Vader to take charge. In season 3, Governor Pryce tells him that she believes the solution to destroy the Rebellion is "someone who saw a bigger picture", and he allows her to use the Imperial fleet commanded by Grand Admiral Thrawn.

=== Agent Kallus ===
Agent Alexsandr Kallus (voiced by David Oyelowo) is a former high-ranking agent of the Imperial Security Bureau and skilled rebel hunter, serving under Darth Vader and working with the Inquisitors. More often than not, he is able to recognize rebel traps and set his own, which nearly succeed in capturing the Lothal rebels. Kallus was present when the Empire massacred the Lasat homeworld of Lasan (Zeb's species) and personally gave the order to use soon-after banned disruptor weapons in the assault. It is later revealed that his hatred of Lasats stems from a harrowing encounter with a Lasat mercenary in his early ISB years, where he was the sole survivor of his unit. Despite his antipathy for Lasats, Kallus respects them as warriors and in fact bears a degree of remorse over the fact that genocide was used to conquer Lasan. He is also a highly trained hand-to-hand combatant and carries a rare Lasat bo-rifle which was given to him by a Lasat Honor Guard he defeated in single combat when their homeworld fell to the Galactic Empire.

On Vader's orders, Kallus sets up Minister Maketh Tua's murder by rigging her shuttle to explode. After he and Zeb crash-land on an ice moon in Geonosis' orbit, they are forced to work together to survive until they are separately rescued, leading Kallus to develop a friendship with Zeb and beginning to sympathize with the rebels. In season 3, he continues to chase the rebels under Governor Pryce and Grand Admiral Thrawn. In the episode "An Inside Man", he is revealed to be spying for the rebels as the latest person to use the alias of Fulcrum; however, his secret is eventually discovered by Thrawn in "Through Imperial Eyes". After escaping Thrawn, Kallus defects to the rebel side.

In the series' finale, he joins the Lothal rebels in their final assault on the Imperial garrison. Sometime after the Battle of Endor, he is rewarded by Zeb by being led to the new Lasat homeworld on Lira San where he is welcomed to stay.

=== Grand Admiral Thrawn ===
Grand Admiral Mitth'raw'nuruodo "Thrawn" (voiced by Lars Mikkelsen) is a high-ranking official in the Imperial Military and one of the few non-humans of notable station in the Empire, born to a species known as the Chiss – a humanoid race defined by blue skin and hair with red eyes.

He was originally introduced in Timothy Zahn's 1990s Thrawn trilogy of novels, and reintroduced into the rebooted timeline with the announcement of his involvement in the third season of Rebels, as well as a new stand-alone novel titled Thrawn that was released in 2017. Filoni stated: "You couldn't have grown up a Star Wars fan without encountering Thrawn in Heir to the Empire. It was a dark time when there weren't any more movies, and it blew our minds that there could be more" when illustrating how important the character was for the expanded universe and the impact of bringing the character back into canon.

During the final battle on Lothal, Thrawn engages Ezra on his Star Destroyer, which is then entangled by the Purrgil that drag it into hyperspace to an unknown location.

Mikkelsen reprise his role in the live-action 2023 series Ahsoka.

=== Commandant Aresko and Taskmaster Grint ===
Commandant Cumberlayne Aresko and Taskmaster Myles Grint (both voiced by David Shaughnessy) are Imperial officers stationed on the planet Lothal. In the episode "Call to Action", Grand Moff Tarkin gives the Grand Inquisitor an order to execute both Aresko and Grint, whom are beheaded offscreen due to their persistent failures to capture the Lothal rebels.

=== Captain Brunson ===
Brunson (voiced by Leslie L. Miller) is a captain who appears in season 3 in the episode "Ghost of Geonosis" part 2, piloting a Light Cruiser and trying to capture the Ghost's crew to gain a promotion for her and her crew. Rebels destroy her ship, but she survives. She is later interviewed with Commander Brom Titus in "Through Imperial Eyes" during Grand Admiral Thrawn's search for the Rebellion agent Fulcrum.

=== The Controller ===
The Controller (voiced by Josh Gad) is an Imperial agent who commands an Imperial spy ship and is capable of controlling droids and machinery. In "Double Agent Droid", he gains control of Chopper to try and discover their hidden base. After failing to eject the Ghost crew into space, they stop Chopper before he can transfer the information. As payback for what he did to her droid, Hera sends in overwhelming data that destroys his ship along with him and his crew.

=== Admiral Konstantine ===
Admiral Kassius Konstantine (voiced by Dee Bradley Baker) is a dismissive Imperial Navy officer in charge of the Imperial blockade on Lothal and later assisting in the Empire's rebellion pursuit in season 2. Later in season 2, he serves Darth Vader, and then the Inquisitors. In season 3, he continues to chase the Rebels under Governor Arihnda Pryce and Grand Admiral Thrawn. In "Zero Hour" part 1, Konstantine assists Thrawn and Pryce in their fight on Atollon. Fed up with taking Thrawn's orders, Konstantine breaks off from the formation and his Imperial Interdictor engages the rebel forces, which ends with Commander Sato setting a collision course that destroys both ships.

=== Alton Kastle ===
Alton Kastle (voiced by Steve Blum) is a journalist working as a broadcaster on HoloNet News on Lothal. He helps to spread propaganda for the Galactic Empire.

=== Yogar Lyste ===
Yogar Lyste (voiced by Liam O'Brien) is an Imperial officer stationed on Lothal as Imperial Supply Master of Capital City. In season 2, he is promoted Lieutenant. In season 3, he is under Thrawn's orders when he comes on Lothal and is manipulated by Kallus into believing Governor Pryce is the rebel spy, and him being framed as the rebel agent called "Fulcrum".

=== Governor Pryce ===
Arihnda Pryce (voiced by Mary Elizabeth McGlynn) is the Governor of the Lothal sector that works for the Galactic Empire. She first appears in season 3 of Rebels. After repeated successes by the rebels against the Empire, Pryce was summoned by Grand Moff Tarkin, who asked how she intended to solve this persistent problem. Pryce responded that she needed "someone who saw a bigger picture", the "someone" turning out to be none other than the feared Grand Admiral Thrawn. After arriving to wipe out the rebels stealing Y-wings, Thrawn orders Pryce to let them escape after realizing that the task force was not the entire rebel fleet. Pryce later ventures to Skystrike Academy to find defecting pilots. After the defectors attempt a botched escape led by rebel Sabine Wren, Pryce interrogates and fights Sabine, only to be electrocuted by her, and the defectors escape. Pryce arrives on Lothal with Thrawn to investigate the sabotage of Imperial equipment. After Thrawn uncovers and kills rebel Morad Sumar, Pryce and the staff put the factory on lockdown, only for the Jedi rebels, Ezra Bridger and Kanan Jarrus to escape with info about a new TIE fighter project with the help of rebel spy Agent Kallus, who later frames Pryce as the Rebel Spy, leading Lyste to shun her. In "Zero Hour", she learns of Kallus's treason after Thrawn exposes him and later assists Thrawn during the battle of Atollon. When Kallus angers her by saying the Rebels are stronger and more malignant than her, she orders for his imprisonment before he neutralized her two Death Troopers and escapes. In "Jedi Night", she deliberately destroys Lothal's Imperial fuel depot in a failed attempt to prevent the Rebels' escape, killing Kanan in the process. Though Pryce attempted to cover up the incident with a celebratory parade, Thrawn learned of the fuel depot's destruction and expressed his anger that the cost of killing the Jedi had foolishly halted the TIE Defender production project. In "A Fool's Hope", she and Rukh launch an attack on the Rebel Base after their location is given away, little realizing that it's a trap, which leads to her capture. In the series finale "Family Reunion – and Farewell", she demonstrates her loyalty to the Empire one last time by choosing to remain on the exploding Command Center rather than remain a prisoner of the Rebels.

=== Valen Rudor ===
Baron Valen Rudor (voiced by Greg Ellis) is an Imperial TIE fighter pilot stationed on Lothal to test new TIE fighter products coming out of Sienar Fleet Systems development in season 1. He returns in the season 4 episode "The Occupation", where, after the death of Old Jho, he has taken over Jho's bar as a reward from the Empire.

=== Rukh ===
Rukh (voiced by Warwick Davis) is a Noghri assassin who, while technically not being a part of the Empire's forces, serves as an agent and tracker to Admiral Thrawn. He has a keen sense of smell which he uses to track down victims, and he wields an electrostaff. He first appears in "Kindred" to track the Ghost rebels after they try to escape with vital information about the TIE Defender, and in "Rebel Assault" he captures Hera Syndulla after the Rebel Alliance's failed attack on the Lothal TIE factory. In "Jedi Night", Rukh battles Kanan during Hera's escape and is knocked off the roof. In "Dume", while tracking the escapees, he battles both Zeb and Sabine, but is defeated and nearly beaten to death by Zeb until Sabine stops him and sends him back unconscious and covered in paint by Sabine to the city as a living message to the Imperial forces.

In "A Fool's Hope", Rukh and Pryce lead an attack on the Rebel Base after the location is betrayed, but it is revealed to be a trap for the Imperials. He is then thrown over a cliff by a Loth-Wolf. In "Family Reunion – and Farewell", Rukh is revealed to have survived the fall and he ambushes Cikatro Vizago, Wolffe, and Mart Mattin, but the Loth-Wolf forces him to flee to warn Thrawn. Rukh reaches Lothal Command Center, where Zeb traps him on a shield generator conductor, and the activation of the generator electrocutes Rukh to death.

Rukh is an original character from the Star Wars Legends Thrawn novel trilogy, where he is Thrawn's bodyguard who ultimately turns against and kills Thrawn.

=== Vult Skerris ===
Vult Skerris (voiced by Mario Vernazza) is an Imperial navy commander and TIE pilot, described by Thrawn as "[my] best pilot." He first appears as one of the instructors at Skystrike Academy in "The Antilles Extraction," where he demonstrates a ruthless disregard for life. Skerris later attempts to prevent the escape of Sabine Wren, Wedge Antilles, and Derek "Hobbie" Klivian, only to be thwarted by the arrival of a Rebel ship that takes the three to safety. He reappears in "Secret Cargo" piloting the prototype TIE Defender in pursuit of Mon Mothma, and though he fails to capture her, he succeeds in destroying three of Gold Squadron's Y-wings. He dies in "Rebel Assault" during the Alliance's attack on the Imperial fleet above Lothal, after Hera Syndulla disables his TIE Defender's shields with a trick and subsequently shoots him down.

=== Brom Titus ===
Brom Titus (voiced by Derek Partridge) is an Admiral who is the steward of a new experimental Imperial Interdictor in season 2. His ship is destroyed by the Rebellion. After his failure, Titus is demoted to a Commander in season 3. He is later interviewed with Captain Brunson in "Through Imperial Eyes" during Grand Admiral Thrawn's search for the Rebellion agent Fulcrum. In the episode "In the Name of the Rebellion: Part 1", he is killed with his crew when his Light Cruiser Marauder is destroyed by Saw Gerrera's explosives on Jalindi.

=== Slavin ===
Captain Slavin (voiced by André Sogliuzzo) is the second in command of Grand Admiral Thrawn. He is first appeared in "Hera's Heroes" in season 3 as nemesis of Cham Syndulla and later of Hera Syndulla. In the episode "In the Name of the Rebellion: Part 2", he commands a Star Destroyer to take a large kyber crystal. He is killed with his crew when the crystal damaged by Saw Gerrera blows up, destroying his ship.

=== Gall Trayvis ===
Senator Gall Trayvis (voiced by Brent Spiner) is an exiled Senator who has the courage to speak out publicly against the Empire by occasionally hacking into holonet news broadcasts. In "Vision of Hope", it is revealed that he is actually in league with the Empire to expose insurgents, and that he had attempted to lure the Ghost crew into a trap. In the same episode, it is revealed that Trayvis knew Ezra's parents. After his plan fails and he is exposed, in the following episode "Call to Action" he publicly proclaims his loyalty to the Empire and places a bounty on the heads of the Rebels.

=== Maketh Tua ===
Minister Maketh Tua (voiced by Kath Soucie) is a Lothal native and a minister for the Galactic Empire, and a graduate of the Imperial Academy. With Planetary Governor Pryce frequently absent conducting business on Coruscant itself, Minister Tua is in charge of the Imperial bureaucracy which runs the day-to-day government on Lothal. Her major tasks include the ongoing efforts to centralize commerce and production on the planet under Imperial control, and promoting development of the planet's new TIE fighter factory, to meet the economic goals set by Tarkin's Five Year Plan. After Kanan's escape from Tarkin at Mustafar during the season 1 finale, Minister Tua fears she will be blamed for failing to apprehend the other Lothal rebels and tries to defect to the Rebel forces. She is killed when her shuttle is blown up on the orders of Darth Vader, who then frames the Rebels for her death to turn the population of Lothal against them.

=== Colonel Yularen ===
Colonel Wullf Yularen (voiced by Tom Kane) was an admiral during the Clone Wars, becoming a colonel in the Imperial Security Bureau. In "Through Imperial Eyes", he is called by Grand Admiral Thrawn during his research of the Rebel agent Fulcrum. He is reunited with his best student Agent Kallus. When Kallus neutralizes Lyste by claiming that he is Fulcrum, Yularen arrests Lyste and congratulates his student. But Thrawn and Yularen ultimately discover that Kallus is Fulcrum, leaving Yularen astonished because he never suspected his best student.

=== Minister Hydan ===
Minister Veris Hydan (voiced by Malcolm McDowell) is an Imperial Minister and expert in archeology and ancient languages who appears as the antagonist in the episodes "Wolves and a Door" and "A World Between Worlds". Hydan is sent by Emperor Palpatine to the Jedi temple on Lothal to uncover a doorway to a void between worlds, which the Emperor intends to use as a stepping stone to gain control of the cosmic Force by manipulating the universe's timeline. Ezra, led by several Loth-Wolves affiliated with the Force, manages to unlock the portal to the void and enter it. Sabine, who has accompanied him to the temple's site, is captured by the Imperial guards and brought before Hydan, who appeals to her interest in art to help him in deciphering the temple's pictograms and murals to find the secret for himself. Sabine is able to discover how to seal the portal, and right afterwards is rescued by Hera and Zeb and subsequently rejoined by Ezra, who uses the knowledge Sabine has gained to seal the portal and collapse the temple. Hydan falls to his death while standing before the crumbling temple, lamenting that all the knowledge he hoped to gain has been wiped out.

=== Stormtroopers ===
The stormtroopers (various voices) are the foot soldiers of the Galactic Empire.

== Mandalorians ==
In season 4 episode 2, the following Mandalorian clans are mentioned:

- Clan Eldar
- Clan Kryze
- Clan Rook
- Clan Saxon (the only clan not to swear loyalty to Bo-Katan Kryze)
- Clan Wren
- Clan Vizsla
- Protectors of Concord Dawn

=== Clan Kryze ===
==== Bo-Katan Kryze ====
Bo-Katan Kryze (voiced by Katee Sackhoff) is a former member of the Mandalorian group known as Death Watch during the Clone Wars, opposing the ideals of her sister Duchess Satine under Pre Vizsla until he was usurped by Darth Maul and forming the Nite Owls to oppose him. A year later, once Maul was driven off Mandalore, Kryze briefly became Regent of Mandalore until her refusal to follow the newly appointed Emperor Palpatine resulted with Clan Saxon being placed in power. Siding with Clan Wren during the Mandalorian Civil War, believing that she had lost the right, she accepted the Darksaber from Sabine to lead their people once more as Mandalore after Sabine and their people convinced her that there was no other that could do it better.

Sackhoff reprises her role in the second season of The Mandalorian, appearing in "Chapter 11: The Heiress" and "Chapter 16: The Rescue" for the character's first live-action appearance.

=== Clan Saxon ===
==== Gar Saxon ====
Gar Saxon (voiced by Ray Stevenson) was the Imperial Viceroy of Mandalore, having been appointed as a figurehead leader by the Empire, and the leader of the Imperial Super Commandos. After discovering that the Protectors of Concord Dawn had allowed rebel ships to pass through their system, he led a squad in annihilating them in order to lure Fenn Rau back to the system. Upon confronting Sabine Wren, he informed her that her family had sided with him and the Empire, but was defeated in battle by her. Saxon would later offer her mother Ursa Wren Sabine's safety in exchange for turning over Kanan and Ezra, only to go back on his word and attempt to wipe out Clan Wren. Having acquired the Darksaber from Ursa, he engaged Sabine in a duel and was defeated. Ursa then shot and killed him after he attempted to shoot Sabine in the back.

==== Tiber Saxon ====
Tiber Saxon (voiced by Tobias Menzies) was Gar Saxon's brother, appointed Imperial Governor of Mandalore and leader of the Super Commandos after his brother was killed by Clan Wren. To put down the Mandalorian rebellion, he ordered the construction of a weapon known as an Arc Pulse Generator, code-named the "Duchess" (after the late Duchess Satine Kryze), developed by Sabine Wren when she was a cadet at the Imperial Academy on Mandalore. The weapon specifically targeted the alloy used in Mandalorian armor and superheated it, vaporizing the wearer. However, as Sabine had destroyed the plans and damaged the prototype when she defected, the weapon was not at its full potential; Grand Admiral Thrawn ordered the new Governor Saxon to capture Sabine to perfect the weapon. Imprisoned aboard Saxon's Star Destroyer in the Mandalorian capital, Sabine altered the weapon to affect the alloys in Imperial armor, before breaching its core with the Darksaber and escaping. The explosion vaporized the Star Destroyer, killing Saxon and those of his men still on board.

=== Clan Wren ===
==== Ursa Wren ====
Countess Ursa Wren (voiced by Sharmila Devar) is Sabine Wren's mother and the current leader of Clan Wren. A former member of the Mandalorian group known as Death Watch, she was later forced to side with the Empire after Sabine created a weapon that the Empire then turned on their own people. Sabine, Kanan, and Ezra travel to her system to straighten things out with her, although she dislikes having Jedi in her headquarters. Concerned primarily with the safety of her family and clan, she made a deal with Gar Saxon in which she will hand over Kanan and Ezra if he promises to leave Sabine alone, only to be betrayed. Ursa would then kill Gar Saxon when he attempted to shoot Sabine in the back after she defeated him, leading Clan Wren in the ensuing Mandalorian Civil War.

==== Alrich Wren ====
Alrich Wren (voiced by Cary-Hiroyuki Tagawa) is Sabine's and Tristan's father and Ursa Wren's husband. Unlike his wife and children, he is not born into Clan Wren and is not a warrior. But, like Sabine, he is a proud Mandalorian artist and can also use technology and explosives to that effect as well. He was a hostage of Gar Saxon, but is freed by his family and the rebels.

==== Tristan Wren ====
Tristan Wren (voiced by Ritesh Rajan) is Sabine's younger brother and the son of Ursa Wren. After Sabine was thought to have betrayed the people of Mandalore, their father was made a captive of Gar Saxon's regime. Seeking to preserve his father's life and restore some measure of standing to Clan Wren, Tristan joined the Imperial Super Commandos, an all Mandalorian Imperial unit under Gar Saxon's command. However, he would later side with his family when Gar Saxon threatened to wipe them out, and later joined Sabine in going to the aid of the rebels on Atollon when Thrawn attacked the planet.

=== Protectors of Concord Dawn ===
==== Fenn Rau ====
Fenn Rau (voiced by Kevin McKidd) was the leader of the Protectors of Concord Dawn, part of the elite Protectors organization who guard the royal family of Mandalore. A veteran of the Clone Wars, he accepted Imperial bribes to prevent rebel travel through his system, but later ordered his men to permit rebel passage to keep the Empire away after being captured by Sabine. He later sided with the Rebellion after his men were slaughtered by the Imperial Super Commandos and eventually joined Clan Wren in the Mandalorian Civil War.

== Underworld figures ==
The crew of the Ghost has also engaged with figures from the galaxy's criminal underworld:

=== Azmorigan ===
Azmorigan (voiced by James Hong) is a Jablogian crime lord and business partner of Vizago's. In his first appearance in "Idiot's Array", he was tricked by Lando Calrissian into giving the entrepreneur a mining-purposed puffer pig and trading it for Hera, who then outsmarted Azmorigan and escaped from his ship, the Merchant One, to Calrissian and the Ghost crew. Azmorigan cornered them at Vizago's mining estate, intending to reclaim the puffer pig and Hera along the Ghost and its crew but was defeated there and is forced to flee. He reappears in "Brothers of the Broken Horn", and is defeated once again by Ezra and Hondo. In The Wynkahthu Job, having formed an alliance with Hondo, with the two of them attacking an Imperial cargo ship only to have it become caught in the storms of a nearby planet, forcing them to call upon the Ghost crew for help. The salvage operation gets the rebels several proton bombs and an encounter with Imperial Sentry Droids, while Hondo only succeeds in unintentionally recovering one of his Ugnaughts.

=== Lando Calrissian ===
Lando Calrissian (voiced by Billy Dee Williams) is a gambling smuggler who wins Chopper in a game of Sabacc against Zeb. He returns him when the Ghost crew smuggled him and his puffer pig past the Imperial blockade. Lando later aids the Ghost crew in their escape from Darth Vader's forces on Lothal in exchange for stolen Imperial goods.

=== Hondo Ohnaka ===
Hondo Ohnaka (voiced by Jim Cummings) is a Weequay who led a group of space pirates that operated on the Outer Rim called the Ohnaka Gang during the Clone Wars. He achieved the legendary feat of capturing Obi-Wan Kenobi, Anakin Skywalker, and Count Dooku at the same time. He lost his crew to the Galactic Empire at some point between The Clone Wars and Rebels. Ezra and Chopper met Hondo in Brothers of the Broken Horn when they answered his distress signal and learned he had won Cikatro Vizago's ship. Following a fight with Azmorigan, Ezra learned that Hondo actually took over Vizago's ship and locked him up aboard it. After Vizago is freed, Hondo escaped from Vizago's ship only to fly back to the Ghost. Hondo allows the crew of the Ghost to keep the generators that Commander Sato needed and takes his leave. He reappeared in Legends of Lasat where he gave intel to the crew of the Ghost on where to find other Lasat survivors, halfway through the episode he was captured by the Empire. In "Steps into Shadow," Ezra, Sabine, Zeb and Chopper rescue him from an Imperial prison in exchange for information on where the Rebellion can steal Y-wings. He joins them on the mission, but escapes midway by stolen Imperial shuttle with a new crew of Ugnaughts. Hondo later returns in The Wynkahthu Job having formed an alliance with Azmorigan, with the two of them attacking an Imperial cargo ship only to have it become caught in the storms of a nearby planet, forcing them to call upon the Ghost crew for help. The salvage operation gets the rebels several proton bombs and an encounter with Imperial Sentry Droids, while Hondo only succeeds in unintentionally recovering one of his Ugnaughts. Hondo later assists the crew of the Ghost during the final battle against Governor Pryce and Grand Admiral Thrawn on Lothal.

=== Ketsu Onyo ===
Ketsu Onyo (voiced by Gina Torres) is a Mandalorian bounty hunter who is an old friend of Sabine Wren. She and Sabine broke out of the Imperial academy on Mandalore together. But when Ketsu left Sabine for dead, she joined the Black Sun while Sabine joined the crew of the Ghost. They met up again in "Blood Sisters" and were initially enemies, but ended up as friends once again after fighting off some Imperial soldiers. Ketsu later assisted the rebels in "The Forgotten Droid" when it comes to finding a star system that is not occupied by the Galactic Empire. Onyo later took part in the final battle to free Lothal in the series finale "Family Reunion and Finale", and continued fighting for the Rebellion elsewhere.

=== Cikatro Vizago ===
Cikatro Vizago (voiced by Keith Szarabajka) is a Devaronian crime lord who the Ghost crew occasionally runs errands and smuggles goods for in exchange for credits and information. In the fourth season, he aids the Ghost crew in getting past the Imperial blockade of Lothal ("The Occupation"), but is found out, sold as a slave to the Mining Guild and made to operate an ore crawler skimming Lothal's surface for minerals ("Crawler Commandeers"). After being freed by Ezra's team, he joins the Lothal rebels, and assists the Ghost crew in the final battle against Governor Pryce and Grand Admiral Thrawn ("A Fool's Hope" and "Family Reunion – and Farewell").

== Lothal residents ==
=== Ryder Azadi ===
Ryder Azadi (voiced by Clancy Brown) is the former Governor of Lothal and a family friend to Ephraim and Mira Bridger. He secretly assisted them in their campaign against the Galactic Empire which led to their arrest. Ryder escaped prison, but his friends did not. He later met Ezra and Kanan on Lothal. After helping in a mission that also involved Princess Leia, Ryder decided to form a new Rebel cell on Lothal. He later pretends to betray the Rebels in order to lure Governor Pryce into a trap. During the final part of the battle, Ryder tries to get Pryce to come along quietly when the Imperial base begins to take off and explode to no avail, but Pryce chooses to die, staying loyal to the Empire until the end.

Brown reprised his role as Ryder in the 2023 live-action miniseries Ahsoka, in which he is revealed to having assisted in the reconstruction of Lothal and once again assumed governorship over it following its liberation, Lothal having quietly sat out the fall of the Empire, avoiding any Imperial retaliation.

=== Ephraim and Mira Bridger ===
Ephraim and Mira Bridger (voiced by Dee Bradley Baker and Kath Soucie respectively) are Ezra's parents who went missing 7 years after Ezra's birth. They were good friends with Ryder Azadi and the Sumar family. According to Ryder Azadi, Ephraim and Mira were killed during a mass prison break. In the series' finale "Family Reunion – and Farewell", Palpatine offers to return Ezra to his parents by having him alter reality, thereby wiping out all that the Rebels have accomplished. However, Ezra decides against it and lets go of his lost past, with his parents giving him their final blessing through the Force.

=== Old Jho ===
Old Jho (voiced by Dee Bradley Baker) is an Ithorian bartender and the owner of Old Jho's Pit Shop, a popular cantina on Lothal, who uses a voice synthesizer to speak with non-Ithorians. He occasionally provides intelligence to the rebels and later becomes a full-fledged member of Ryder Azadi's Rebel cell. It is later learned that he was caught helping members of the Lothal rebel cell and summarily executed by the Empire. His bar was given to Valen Rudor as a reward for his services to the Empire.

=== Jai Kell ===
Jai Kell (voiced by Dante Basco) is a young Lothalian who enthusiastically joined the Imperial Academy, where he encountered Ezra, who was attending undercover to steal an Imperial encoder. When he learned that the Inquisitor intended to take him away for "special training", just as he had done with Jai's sister, Jai defected with Ezra's help, rejoined his mother and went into hiding ("Breaking Ranks"). Jai returns in the fourth season, aiding Ezra and the Ghost crew during the Imperial occupation of Lothal as part of Ryder Azadi's rebel cell ("The Occupation").

=== Morad and Marida Sumar ===
Morad and Marida Sumar (voiced by Liam O'Brien and Vanessa Marshall) are a Lothal farmer couple who are friends of Ezra's parents. The two are taken captive by the Empire but later freed by Ezra, after which he end up joining Ryder Azadi's Rebel cell. Morad is later killed by Grand Admiral Thrawn in "An Inside Man" after helping Kanan and Ezra infiltrate the Imperial factory on Lothal, where he had been working as a saboteur.

=== Tseebo ===
Tseebo (voiced by Peter MacNicol) is a Rodian friend of Ezra's parents who is wanted by the Empire for uploading half their secrets into the Imperial cybernetic digital implant fused into his brain.

== Clone Wars veterans ==
The following characters are veterans in the Clone Wars:

=== Clone troopers ===
==== Captain Gregor ====
Captain Gregor/CC-5576-39 (voiced by Dee Bradley Baker) is a clone commando and survivor of the Foxtrot Group, who was promoted to commander after his near-death ordeal on Abafar while helping Meebur Gascon on his mission. Sometime after the Clone Wars, Gregor suffered brain damage and suffers from brief moments of mild insanity. In the series' finale "Family Reunion – and Farewell", Gregor and Wolffe join the Lothal Rebels in their final fight against the Empire, and is mortally wounded while aiding in activating the Imperial base's shield generator to protect Lothal City from Imperial bombardment.

==== Commander Wolffe ====
Commander Wolffe/CC-3636 (voiced by Dee Bradley Baker) is a clone commander who served under Jedi Master Plo-Koon during the Clone Wars, Wolffe is physically notable for his maimed right eye. In "The Lost Commanders", motivated to protect his fellow clones, he betrayed the Ghost crew and told the Empire their location; but returned to rescue them. He and Gregor later join the Lothal rebels in the series' finale to liberate their planet from Imperial occupation.

=== Battle droids ===
A battalion of battle droids (voiced by Matthew Wood) remain on Agamar under Kalani's command, along with droidekas. They fight the Rebels and then allied with them against the Empire. The surviving Battle Droids escape with Kalani.

==== General Kalani ====
General Kalani (voiced by Gregg Berger) is a super tactical droid who leads a still-active, but depleted, army of Separatist Battle Droids and Droidekas on Agamar. He first appeared during Season 5 of The Clone Wars as the droid general on Onderon. He blocked the deactivation command during Order 66, thinking it a Republic trap, and he and his troops remained active on Agamar. Kalani wanted to fight Rex to finish the Clone Wars and to prove who was superior, droid or clone, once and for all. But Ezra prevented Rex from destroying him, and makes him understand that the Empire manipulated Droids and Clones alike to strengthen and become more powerful. Kalani then makes peace with Rex and allied with the Rebels to fight the Empire and escaped. He decides not to join the Rebellion for the moment, projecting their chance of victory as minuscule.

== Force wielders ==
=== Maul ===
Maul (voiced by Sam Witwer) is a Zabrak former Sith Lord and apprentice to Emperor Palpatine, having lost his position when Obi-Wan Kenobi defeated him in The Phantom Menace. Maul resurfaced during the Clone Wars and attempted to set up a criminal empire before Palpatine personally dealt with him. Ending up on the run and his race no more after the Nightsisters' slaughter by the Separatists, Maul travels to the planet Malachor where he meets Ezra while seeking an underground Sith temple. Despite having a mutual enemy in the Inquistors by killing the Fifth Brother and the Seventh Sister, Maul reveals his true intentions and desire to take Ezra as an apprentice. After Maul blinds Kanan during the resulting scuffle, he ultimately escapes Malachor in one of the Inquisitors' TIE Fighters after the temple is destroyed. He would later return in the third season to claim both the Jedi and Sith Holocrons to peer into the future, escaping once more with only a faint image of a man he had assumed dead: Obi-Wan Kenobi. For the first time in a long while, this gives Maul clarity and purpose: to find and kill his old adversary. After talking Ezra into a using a Nightsister ritual to access the other's mind for the rest of the vision in "Visions and Voices," Maul's only clue of finding Obi-Wan is on a desert planet with twin suns. Although he succeeds in finding his old rival in "Twin Suns", he is ultimately cut down after a short duel. The dying Maul learns that Obi-Wan is protecting "the Chosen One". He states that "he will avenge us," finally letting go of his hate for Obi-Wan, and dies in his old enemy's arms.

=== The Bendu ===
The Bendu (voiced by Tom Baker) debuted in the season 3 episode, "Steps Into Shadow". Bendu was a Force-sensitive individual who resided on the remote planet of Atollon and represented the "center" of the Force, between the light side and the dark side. "Jedi and Sith wield the Ashla and Bogan. The light and the dark. I'm the one in the middle. The Bendu..." stated Bendu. The term "Bendu" first appears in the original script for Star Wars as the name of the Jedi Knights, the "Jedi-Bendu". In his first appearance, he teaches Kanan how to get along with the krykna hexapod spiders that roam the planet, following Kanan's blinding by Maul on Malachor, with the Sith Holocron becoming entrusted to The Bendu afterwards. In "The Holocrons of Fate", Ezra and Kanan return to retrieve it from him in order to save their friends from Darth Maul, during which he warns them that combining the knowledge of the Sith and Jedi Holocrons can be dangerous. In the two-part episode "Zero Hour", Bendu tells Kanan that he will not help him upon Grand Admiral Thrawn bringing war to Atollon since he is neutral and his anger worsens when Kanan calls him a coward. He later creates a storm to attack the Imperials and Rebels to force them off the planet, buying the Ghost crew some time to get away while he is shot down by AT-AT fire. When Thrawn shot at him, Bendu disappears, leaving Thrawn with a prophecy of his eventual defeat when "many arms surround him in a cold embrace". Bendu's prophecy comes true in the series finale "Family Reunion – and Farewell" when Thrawn's Star Destroyer is removed from Lothal by the Purrgil.

=== The Presence ===
The Presence (voiced by Nika Futterman) is housed inside a Sith Holocron used to gain access to an Ancient Sith Temple found on Malachor. The voice of the holocron tries to convince Ezra to use the Temple to gain absolute power to use against his enemies. During Ahsoka's battle with Vader, Kanan and Ezra work together to remove the holocron from its base, destabilizing the entire temple in the process as the collected energy releases explosively and collapses the structure. Ezra later opens the Holocron and learns dark side secrets from the Presence, before the Holocron is taken by Kanan and entrusted to the Bendu. Ezra and Kanan later recover it and brought it to a meeting with Maul. The merging of this Holocron and Kanan's Jedi Holocron allow Ezra and Maul to see a vision, but the encounter is disrupted, causing both Holocrons to shatter and presumably destroying the Presence.

=== The White Loth-Wolf ===
The Loth-Wolf (voiced by "Himself") is a member of a rare predatory species on Lothal, who resemble giant Earth wolves as tall as a human and are in tune with the Force residing on Lothal. This specific Loth-Wolf is differentiated from his kin by a white coat and his ability to formulate singular words in Galactic Common. Though indifferent to the conflict between the Rebellion and the Empire, he and the other Loth-Wolves, aware of the grave threat the latter posed, assist the Ghost crew, particularly Kanan and Ezra, in their struggle against it. He first appears in the fourth-season episode "Flight of the Defender".

=== Jedi ===
==== Obi-Wan Kenobi ====
Obi-Wan Kenobi (voiced by James Arnold Taylor as a young man, Stephen Stanton and Alec Guinness as the older "Ben Kenobi") is a former General of the Clone Wars and the original Jedi Master of Darth Vader who appears throughout the original and prequel trilogies. A younger version of Obi-Wan broadcasts a holographic message declaring the fall of the Galactic Republic and the Jedi Order after Order 66 while warning any surviving Jedi to lay low. Kenobi broadcasts this warning off-screen in Revenge of the Sith, but it is shown in the first episode of Rebels. A holocron bearing Kenobi's message is among Kanan's possessions. Getting the holocron to work is used by Kanan as a test for Ezra's Force potential in "Spark of Rebellion".

In the episode "Holocrons of Fate" while Ezra is studying the Holocrons to determine how to destroy the Sith, Maul sees in the Holocrons that Obi-Wan is still alive. In the episode "Visions and Voices", Maul and Ezra both discover that Obi-Wan Kenobi is in hiding on a desert planet with twin suns. In "Twin Suns", Maul travels to Tatooine with the goal of killing Obi-Wan, luring Ezra to the planet in an attempt to draw out Obi-Wan. After rescuing Ezra from the planet's harsh desert conditions, Obi-Wan Kenobi gives the young rebel advice regarding his true mission. Obi-Wan then guides Ezra off the planet before engaging and killing Maul in a duel. Before Maul dies, Obi-Wan confirms to him that his purpose on Tatooine is to protect the "Chosen One." The threat now eliminated, Obi-Wan continues his secret mission of watching over a young Luke Skywalker (the secret biological son of Darth Vader) whom he believes to be the "Chosen One", destined to bring balance to the Force and defeat the Sith.

When Ezra enters the Lothol Jedi Temple in "A World Between Worlds," Obi-Wan's voice is among those heard. Ezra later calls out to both Obi-Wan and Yoda believing they might be present.

==== Yoda ====
Yoda (voiced by Frank Oz) is the 900 year old Jedi Master, who went into exile on Dagobah following the Jedi Purge. Though he is mentioned numerous times by Kanan, Ahsoka, and Ezra thought the series, he first appears as a disembodied voice in "Path of the Jedi" where he guides Ezra through the Jedi Temple. In "Shroud of Darkness," Yoda appears before Ezra (and later Ahsoka) in a vision of a starfield and instructs him to find Malachor. When Ezra enters the Lothal Jedi Temple in "A World Between Worlds" Yoda's voice is among those heard. Ezra later calls out to both Obi-Wan and Yoda believing they might be present.

Filoni stated: "I felt personally to keep Yoda as this disembodied thing it would confuse the audience less. I didn't want you to think Yoda could be teleporting from planet to planet".

== Incidental characters ==
=== 2-1B ===
2-1B is a medical droid who first appeared in The Empire Strikes Back, tending to Luke Skywalker in the bacta tank after the Wampa attack on Hoth, and replacing Luke's hand, to Anakin Skywalker in Revenge of the Sith, and again to other characters in Star Wars Rebels.

=== Jan Dodonna ===
Jan Dodonna (voiced by Michael Bell) is a general and leader of the Rebel base on Yavin IV, who previously appeared planning the starfighter attack on the first Death Star in A New Hope. returning in Rogue One, Rebels, and several issues of Marvel's comic series Star Wars, being the first character to utter the phrase "May the Force be with you".

=== Gonk Droid ===
The Gonk Droid, also known as the GNK power droid, is a boxy, rectangular-shaped droid that walks very slowly. It is literally a bipedal, walking power generator. After appearing in the Jawa's sandcrawler in the original 1977 Star Wars film, a "Power Droid" figure was produced for Kenner's Star Wars action figure line in 1978, before returning in the Rebels episode "Blood Sisters", and the film Rogue One.

=== Hobbie Klivian ===
Derek "Hobbie" Klivian (voiced by Trevor Devall) is a Rogue Squadron pilot and member of the Rebel Alliance in Rebels, introduced in The Empire Strikes Back.

=== RA-7 ===
RA-7 ("Death Star droid") is a droid who has a recurring role in Rebels, assisting Hera Syndulla's Phoenix Squadron. Originally appearing in the 1977 film Star Wars, these protocol droids are primarily used by Imperial officers as servants. They are also known as "Insect droids" or '"Death Star droids", due to the large numbers used aboard the Death Star. An RA-7 droid dubbed "Death Star Droid", was produced for Kenner's Star Wars action figure line in 1978. The RA-7 type droid named AP-5

=== Cham Syndulla ===
Cham Syndulla (voiced by Robin Atkin Downes) is a Twi'lek freedom fighter and Hera's father, who opposes the Separatists independently before allying with the Republic Army when the Clone Wars come to Ryloth. In the aftermath of the Clone Wars, Cham opposes the newly established Galactic Empire's occupation of his world and becomes distanced from Hera after the death of her mother due to his single-minded determination to liberate Ryloth at any cost. The pair are later reconciled after Cham and his warriors Gobi and Numa team up with Hera's crew to steal an Imperial carrier and shoot down an Imperial cruiser over Ryloth. The character first appeared in Star Wars: The Clone Wars.

=== Jacen Syndulla ===
Jacen Syndulla is the Twi'lek and human hybrid son of Hera Syndulla and Kanan Jarrus, born in the series finale of Rebels. He was conceived some point shortly before his father's death and was born some point during the Galactic Civil War after Liberation of Lothal. Through his mother he is the grandson of the Twi'lek freedom fighter General Cham Syndulla, and inherits his mother's love of flying. He makes his live-action debut in the 2023 series Ahsoka, portrayed by Evan Whitten, depicted as having inherited Force sensitivity from his father.

== See also ==
- List of Star Wars characters
- List of Star Wars cast members
