= Vanto =

Vanto may refer to:

- The Vanto Group, the parent company of Landmark Worldwide
- Eli Vanto, a character first appearing in the novel Star Wars: Thrawn
