= Thrawn trilogy =

1991–93 Star Wars universe novel trilogy

- Heir to the Empire (1991); Dark Force Rising (1992); The Last Command (1993)
- Author: Timothy Zahn
- Country: United States
- Language: English
- Genre: Science fiction
- Publisher: Bantam Spectra
- Published: 1991–1993
- Media type: Print (hardcover & paperback); Audiobook; E-book

The Thrawn trilogy, also known as the Heir to the Empire trilogy, is a trilogy of novels set in the Star Wars universe, written by Timothy Zahn between 1991 and 1993. The first book marked the end of a notable drought of new Star Wars material over a four-year period, between the 10th anniversary of the original 1977 film's release and the release of Heir to the Empire (1991).

Set approximately five years after the events depicted in Return of the Jedi, the trilogy details the offensive campaigns of military genius Grand Admiral Thrawn as he attempts to bring down the recently founded New Republic in a bid to restore the Galactic Empire to power. In addition to Thrawn, the trilogy introduces several new and notable characters, including Mara Jade and Talon Karrde.

The Thrawn trilogy sold a combined total of 15 million books, with Heir to the Empire reaching #1 on the New York Times Best Seller list. The trilogy has been met with critical acclaim, and its success is credited to the creation of the Star Wars Expanded Universe (EU), with the planet Coruscant from the trilogy later being adapted by George Lucas to his prequel trilogy of Star Wars films.

On the Star Wars expanded universe's 2014 reboot, characters and concepts from the Thrawn trilogy were adapted to canon media, with Thrawn appearing in the animated Disney XD series Star Wars Rebels (2014) and, later, in the Disney+ live-action series Ahsoka (2023), portrayed by Lars Mikkelsen. Rukh, an assassin and bodyguard for Thrawn, appears in Rebels as well as Tales of the Empire (2022), voiced by veteran Lucasfilm talent Warwick Davis—the original actor behind the Ewok character Wicket W. Warrick in films like Return of the Jedi (1983) and Caravan of Courage (1984), among others. Gilad Pellaeon, an Imperial officer, was seen in the third season of The Mandalorian (2023), portrayed by Xander Berkeley.

Zahn has also written two additional, alternate Thrawn trilogies in the new canon—Thrawn (2017–2019) and Thrawn Ascendancy (2020–2021); he has also consulted on Ahsoka.

== Books ==
=== Heir to the Empire (1991) ===
In Heir to the Empire (1991), master tactician Grand Admiral Thrawn plots to destroy the New Republic despite their numerical advantage over the remaining Imperial forces. He sets his sights on the Wayland storehouse of the late Emperor Palpatine, which contains a massive array of Spaarti cloning cylinders and a working cloaking shield. To this end, Thrawn and his subordinate Gilad Pellaeon, captain of the Star Destroyer Chimaera, enlist the help of smuggler Talon Karrde and his second-in-command Mara Jade to obtain several salamander-like creatures called ysalamiri. Thrawn uses the ysalamiri, which possess the natural ability to repel the Force, to subdue the storehouse's guardian Joruus C'baoth, a twisted clone of a Jedi Master whom the Grand Admiral had killed years before. C'baoth offers his allegiance in exchange for two acolytes to bend to his will: Darth Vader's twin children, Luke Skywalker and Princess Leia Organa. Thrawn sends some of his Noghri killers to capture Luke and a pregnant Leia, but their attempts repeatedly fail. Leia defends herself from one attack and is surprised when the Noghri suddenly surrenders. Thrawn launches his first offensive, a series of hit-and-run attacks into New Republic territory, before stealing a complement of mole miners from Lando Calrissian's mining operations on Nkllon. In need of warships, and with his previous tactics having forced over 100 lightly crewed ships to be stationed at the Sluis Van shipyards as he planned, Thrawn invades. His stormtroopers use the stolen miners to board and hijack the ships; however, his efforts are thwarted, as Calrissian seizes control of the miners, remotely. Thrawn withdraws his forces; thanks to his plotting, his New Republic nemesis, the Mon Calamari Admiral Ackbar, is subsequently arrested on accusations of treason.

=== Dark Force Rising (1992) ===
In Dark Force Rising (1992), it is revealed that before the Clone Wars, the Old Republic had constructed a fleet of highly automated heavy cruisers, known as the Katana fleet. A virus infected the crews of the entire fleet and drove them insane. The fleet was never seen again until Karrde discovered it (several years before the events of the first book). With access to Palpatine's private storehouse on the planet Wayland, Thrawn presses his advantage to marshal more forces for the battle against the New Republic. Mara Jade, in an attempt to exonerate the Empire's warrant for Karrde's arrest, goes to Thrawn and offers to reveal the location of the Katana fleet. Instead, he has her followed and Karrde is captured. Luke and Mara rescue Karrde from Thrawn's Star Destroyer as Thrawn attempts to capture another man who knows about the Katana fleet. Meanwhile, Leia learns that the Noghri serve the Empire because they revere her late father, Darth Vader, who they believe saved their planet Honoghr from ecological disaster. Leia convinces them that they have been deceived and effectively enslaved by the Empire, and they switch sides. With Ackbar temporarily neutralized as a tactical opponent, Thrawn leads an army of clones to claim the so-called "Katana fleet", outmaneuvering Luke, Lando, and Han Solo.

=== The Last Command (1993) ===
In The Last Command (1993), set about a month after the previous book, Thrawn uses the Katana fleet, crewed with clones, to mount a successful offensive against the New Republic. Seizing one planet after the other, Thrawn soon immobilizes the galactic capital world, Coruscant. He has placed multiple cloaked asteroids around the planet, and through a ruse, he has led the New Republic leadership to believe that Coruscant is surrounded with them. Learning of the deception, the Republic fleet attacks the Imperial shipyards at Bilbringi to capture a device that can find the cloaked asteroids, but Thrawn's forces intercept and surround them. Meanwhile, Luke and Leia lead a group to destroy the cloning facility on Wayland, killing C'baoth and destroying the cloning cylinders. Just as Thrawn and Pellaeon learn that the Noghri aided in the attack on Wayland, Thrawn's Noghri bodyguard, Rukh, kills the Grand Admiral—whose last words are, "But ... it was so artistically done." The tide of battle at Bilbringi turns, and with the hope of victory dashed by Thrawn's death, Pellaeon orders the Imperial forces to retreat.

== Development ==
The idea for a post-Star Wars film trilogy was conceived by Lou Aronica, an editor at Bantam Books who proposed a series as "ambitious as the films were". George Lucas was initially skeptical of the proposal, but acquiesced; Bantam Spectra then brought Timothy Zahn on board to write the trilogy.

Zahn was given freedom to develop the direction the story should go in, with minimal pushback from Lucasfilm. Before starting work on the books, Zahn was only given two rules: the series had to take place three to five years after Return of the Jedi, and no characters killed in the films could return. Changes requested by Lucasfilm included changing an evil clone of Obi-Wan Kenobi to the new character of Joruus C'baoth and the renaming of Rukh's species from Sith to Noghri. In order to provide him with existing worldbuilding material, Lucasfilm supplied Zahn with supplementary content from the tabletop RPG Star Wars: The Roleplaying Game.

When conceiving of the antagonist for the series, Zahn desired a villain who was less brutal than Darth Vader or Emperor Palpatine. Instead, Zahn sought inspiration from military commanders throughout history and envisaged an adversary who could outsmart the protagonists. In creating the character of Thrawn, Timothy Zahn said:

I think it's because he was so different from any other villain we'd seen in Star Wars to that time. Most Imperials seemed to follow the "hit it with a rock" school of thought regarding opposition. Thrawn, in contrast, used strategy and careful planning and usually managed to be two or three steps ahead of the New Republic. Readers like their villains to be a challenge to the heroes because that forces the heroes to bring their best game to the field. The more clever the opponent, and the more difficult the fight, the more satisfying the victory.

The original, working title for Heir to the Empire was "Wild Card", which was rejected by Lucasfilm because they believed it was too similar to Bantam's Wild Cards series. The alternate name "The Emperor's Hand" was also rejected. Warlord's Gambit was also a potential title, but ultimately Heir to the Empire was chosen, which according to Zahn was suggested by Aronica.

== Adaptations ==
Denis Lawson, who portrayed Wedge Antilles in the original Star Wars trilogy and Star Wars: The Rise of Skywalker, narrates the abridged audiobook of Heir to the Empire. Anthony Daniels, who portrayed C-3PO in ten live-action Star Wars films, (Note: Every film of the nine part Skywalker saga and one anthology film, Rogue One.) and one animated film narrates Dark Force Rising and The Last Command. Lucasfilm and Varèse Sarabande Records producer Robert Townson discussed the creation of a score to promote the trilogy. (Note: They later collaborated on the Shadows of the Empire soundtrack.) All three books were adapted as comic books by Dark Horse Comics between 1995 and 1998. The series was divided into six issues per book, written by Mike Baron, who says, "I didn't invent any language. All the language is Zahn's." The first volume was illustrated by French artists Olivier Vatine and Fred Blanchard, the second by Terry Dodson and Kevin Nowlan, and the third by Edvin Biuković and Eric Shanower. The entire trilogy was collected in 2009 as a single graphic novel. In 2011, a 20-year anniversary edition of the book was published, which included an introduction and annotations by Timothy Zahn, commentary by Lucasfilm and Del Rey books, and a new novella centered around the character of Thrawn. For the trilogy's 20th anniversary, Heir to the Empire, Dark Force Rising and The Last Command would be granted brand new unabridged audiobook productions, narrated by Marc Thompson and featuring official Star Wars music and sound effects. From 2012 to 2014, the trilogy was adapted into an exclusively German full cast audio drama, directed by Oliver Döring and featuring the original voice actors from the German movie dubs as well as sound effects and John Williams' score from the movies.

Each novel in the trilogy had its own Star Wars role-playing game sourcebook created for it by West End Games. When the rules for the Star Wars RPG changed, the three volumes were collected into one book for the entire Thrawn trilogy, which also served as a second edition to the original three sourcebooks. According to Zahn, the writing of the trilogy was coordinated with preexisting West End Games materials (at the behest of Lucasfilm). Also, "They filled in a bunch of gaps I hadn't got around to filling in."

== Reception ==
Heir to the Empire reached #1 on the New York Times Best Seller list, and the trilogy sold a combined total of 15 million copies. The trilogy has been called "influential, much-loved, and ground breaking". In August 2011, the series was voted into NPR's top 100 science-fiction and fantasy books (coming in at place 88), as voted on by over 60,000 participants. Writing for Tor.com, Ryan Britt stated that the Heir to the Empire was closer to traditional science fiction rather than the epic space fantasy Star Wars was known for; he also compliments the character of Mara Jade for improving the perception of female characters in the franchise and not adhering to "damsel in distress" stereotypes. Zahn's use of supplementary material from Star Wars: The Roleplaying Game has been credited for creating a sense of unity between different publications, allowing for a more believable shared universe.

Some reviews have been more critical, with prolific fansite author Jonathan Hicks saying that the Force is trivialised and that there were too many references to the original movies, in a 2000 review republished by starwars.com.

The trilogy allowed Lucasfilm to expand its non-film media into the mainstream, as opposed to the more niche comic book and role-playing game markets it was previously focusing on. The success of the series prompted Lucasfilm to immediately commission more books to continue the Star Wars story.

== Legacy ==
The Thrawn trilogy is widely credited with revitalizing the Star Wars franchise, although Zahn himself was skeptical of this. In The Secret History of Star Wars, Michael Kaminski suggests that this renewed interest was a factor in George Lucas' decision to create the Star Wars prequel trilogy. The trilogy's success has been cited as beginning the Star Wars Expanded Universe.

Zahn would go on to write a pair of sequel books, in the Hand of Thrawn duology (Specter of the Past (1997) and Vision of the Future (1998)), expanding on the background of the Thrawn character. He would later develop Thrawn's legacy further by writing Survivor's Quest (2004), and subsequently the prequel novel Outbound Flight (2006).

Mara Jade, first appearing in the trilogy, went on to become a major character in the Star Wars Expanded Universe, appearing in future novels, comics, and video games. She was chosen by IGN as the 19th top Star Wars character, and by UGO Networks as the seventh top Star Wars Expanded Universe character.

Although Lucas did not consider the Expanded Universe to be canonical, he adopted the name Coruscant for the galactic capital in the prequel trilogy, which was created by Zahn in the Heir to the Empire. While the Thrawn trilogy was rendered noncanonical following the Disney acquisition of the Star Wars franchise, the character of Thrawn was later re-canonized by Lucasfilm when he was introduced on Star Wars Rebels, voiced by Lars Mikkelsen, in which Rukh also appeared, voiced by Warwick Davis. Zahn returned soon after to write an alternate trilogy surrounding the Thrawn character, in Star Wars: Thrawn (2017), Thrawn: Alliances (2018), and Thrawn: Treason (2019), and later a prequel trilogy about the character in the Ascendency trilogy. Zahn consulted on Thrawn's adaptation to live-action in the television series Ahsoka, with Mikkelsen reprising his role as Thrawn from Rebels. Gilad Pellaeon also made his live-action and Star Wars canon debut in the third season of The Mandalorian, portrayed by Xander Berkeley. Mikkelsen, Berkeley and Davis reprised their roles in Tales of the Empire: The Path of Anger. The Chimaera captained by Thrawn appeared in Rebels and Ahsoka. In the current canon, the New Republic has been featured in The Mandalorian, The Book of Boba Fett and Ahsoka and Mon Mothma was elected chancellor. The events of the Thrawn trilogy and The Mandalorian take place five years after the events of Return of the Jedi.

== See also ==
- Heir to the Empire Sourcebook
- Dark Force Rising Sourcebook
- The Last Command Sourcebook
