= Star Wars: Thrawn =

2017 novel by Timothy Zahn

- Author: Timothy Zahn
- Language: English
- Series: Star Wars
- Genre: Science fiction
- Publisher: Del Rey Books
- Publication date: April 11, 2017
- Publication place: United States
- Media type: Print; E-book; Audiobook
- Pages: 448
- ISBN: 978-0-345-51127-0 (First edition)
- Followed by: Thrawn: Alliances

Star Wars: Thrawn (also known simply as Thrawn) is a Star Wars novel by Timothy Zahn, published on April 11, 2017, by Del Rey Books. It chronicles the rise of Grand Admiral Thrawn, a popular character originating from the Star Wars Legends line of works, which were declared non-canon to the franchise after Disney redefined Star Wars continuity in April 2014. The novel was announced in July 2016 alongside news that the character Thrawn would be reintroduced into the Star Wars franchise on the 3D CGI animated television series Star Wars Rebels.

A sequel, titled Thrawn: Alliances, was released in July 2018. A third novel, Thrawn: Treason, was released in July 2019.

== Plot ==
Found on an unnamed Outer Rim planet, the exiled Chiss warrior Thrawn pledges himself to Emperor Palpatine and joins the Imperial navy. Thrawn's cunning and expertise as a tactician help him to rise through the ranks with unprecedented speed, though his renegade tactics ignite the ire of his superiors. At Thrawn's side is his translator-turned-aide-de-camp, Ensign Eli Vanto, whom he trains in the ways of war. Meanwhile, ruthless administrator Arihnda Pryce plots her own rise to power.

== Development ==
The character of Thrawn was originally introduced in Zahn's 1991 novel Heir to the Empire, and became a fan favorite. He went on to appear in several other novels, short stories, comics, and video games. Following the 2012 acquisition of Lucasfilm by The Walt Disney Company, most of the licensed Star Wars fiction produced since the originating 1977 film Star Wars were rebranded as Star Wars Legends and declared non-canon to the franchise in April 2014.

In a prerecorded video, Zahn announced at the London Star Wars Celebration in July 2016 that he was writing a new novel for Del Rey Books titled Thrawn. The same day, Del Rey confirmed on Twitter the novel's spring 2017 release. In a subsequent interview with StarWars.com, Zahn noted that the novel would cover several years between Thrawn's "first encounter" with the Empire and the events of the third season of Star Wars Rebels, an animated television series in which the character will appear prior to the book's release. He said:

It's very exciting [to write Thrawn again]. A writer never knows which characters are going to click with the readers, and it was highly gratifying to me that Thrawn captured the imaginations of so many people over the past quarter century. Over the years I've written a lot of books and stories that featured him, but with this book I'll be visiting a part of his life that I never before had a chance to explore.

Asked if he would be incorporating any material from previous Thrawn novels, Zahn said, "I've thrown in a few bits and pieces. Nothing too blatant, just little Easter eggs for those who are familiar with my other books." Though in Legends works Thrawn was mostly used in post-Return of the Jedi storylines, both Rebels and Thrawn take place prior to the events of the original 1977 film and show his rise to power. Zahn said, "I get to show how he's treated by his fellow officers and shipmates on his way up the military ladder, particularly when he's not in a command position over them."

A full synopsis of the novel was released in January 2017, followed by an excerpt in March 2017.

== Publication ==
Thrawn was published on April 11, 2017. Del Rey Books produced three variant covers: the standard edition is white, featuring Thrawn's face split by the spine; the Barnes & Noble-exclusive edition has the same cover design in black, with a double-sided pull out poster that has a Thrawn portrait on one side and the Del Rey novel timeline on the other; and the Star Wars Celebration limited edition has a textless cover with Thrawn's full face, the portrait on the back cover, and special end papers.

== Reception ==
The Verge said that the book "a welcome resurrection of one of the extended universe’s brightest points." Nerdist wrote: "Overall, Thrawn takes some familiarities, expands them, and paints an intimate portrait that gives new life to a beloved character." Gizmodo compared the novel to other recent Star Wars books: "Zahn is simply a better storyteller with a better handle on his characters and his plots than we’ve seen in a while." Den of Geek gave a mixed review, and said that "the novel gets dragged down by its own pacing".

== Comic adaptation ==
In July 2017, Marvel Comics announced that a comic book miniseries adaptation of Thrawn is scheduled for release in early 2018. The first issue was released on February 14, 2018, with five more to follow on a monthly basis.

== Sequels ==
=== Thrawn: Alliances ===
A sequel to Thrawn, titled Thrawn: Alliances, was announced during New York Comic Con in October 2017. The novel was scheduled to be released on June 26, 2018, but was later delayed to July 24, 2018. The cover artwork was revealed in November 2017, and an excerpt was released on the official Star Wars website on March 23, 2018. The excerpt was the first canon appearance of the planet Batuu, which was featured in Star Wars: Galaxy's Edge, the new theme park expansion at Disneyland and Disney's Hollywood Studios, in 2019. Thrawn: Alliances was released by Del Rey Books on July 24, 2018, and debuted at #1 on The New York Times Best Seller list.

Thrawn: Alliances focuses on Thrawn's partnership with Darth Vader, whom he meets at the conclusion of Thrawn. In the novel, Grand Admiral Thrawn and Darth Vader are sent on a mission to the unknown regions to explore a disturbance in the Force felt by Emperor Palpatine. The mission is more than that, however, as Thrawn's split loyalties between the Empire and his native people the Chiss and Vader's past as a Jedi require a test of loyalty for both. The book also features flashbacks to a Clone Wars conflict featuring Thrawn and Anakin Skywalker.

=== Thrawn: Treason ===
In December 2018, it was announced that Timothy Zahn would write and publish another Thrawn sequel, titled Thrawn: Treason. The novel was released by Del Rey Books on July 23, 2019, and debuted at #5 on The New York Times Best Seller list.

The novel explores the crisis Thrawn encounters when he discovers that his people are in peril, forcing him to choose between loyalty to the Empire or loyalty to the Chiss Ascendancy.

== Prequels ==
At the 2019 New York Comic Con, a new prequel trilogy from Zahn was announced to launch with Book I: Chaos Rising in May 2020. After being delayed twice, the first novel was ultimately released on September 1, 2020. In October 2020 a sequel to Chaos Rising was announced, titled Greater Good, which was released on 27 April 2021. On April 1, 2020, the final novel in the Thrawn Ascendency trilogy was announced, titled Lesser Evil, which was released on November 16, 2021.
