= The Blackcollar =

1983 novel by Timothy Zahn

The Blackcollar is the debut novel by Timothy Zahn published in 1983. First in the Blackcollar trilogy.

== Plot summary ==
In the early 25th century, the Terran Democratic Empire is drawn into a war with an alien race known as the Ryqril. Among the weapons they develop in hopes of defending themselves are the Blackcollars, ultimate guerilla fighters with enhanced speed and reflexes, equipped with ancient but undetectable weapons such as slingshots, throwing stars, and nunchaku.

Unfortunately, it was a case of too little, too late. Humanity lost the war thoroughly, and the Ryqril took over government of the TDE's worlds by means of loyalty-conditioned administrators and security personnel, backed up by heavily armed Ryqril soldiers. Twenty-nine years later, an underground member named Allen Caine is equipped with carefully forged identification papers and sent on a mission that could change the balance of power once again.

Unfortunately, his resistance cell is destroyed before they can provide him with the papers he needs to complete his mission, so when he arrives on the unfamiliar planet of Plinry he is forced to seek help from the local Blackcollars, led by the enigmatic Damon Lathe. Allen's hope is that if he can recruit Lathe's Blackcollars to rejoin the fight against the Ryqril, they can help the Terran resistance to find a missing fleet of Nova-class starships that might spark a new war for freedom. But Prefect Gallaway and other loyalty-conditioned humans may prove a bigger hindrance to the Blackcollars than they ever imagined.

== Reception ==
Dave Langford reviewed The Blackcollar for White Dwarf #81, and stated that "The conclusion has a touch of political realism which almost makes the whole farrago credible. Lightweight entertainment."

== Reviews ==
- Review by Tom Easton (1984) in Analog Science Fiction/Science Fact, February 1984
- Review by Ken Lake (1987) in Paperback Inferno, #64
