= Conquerors trilogy =

Novel trilogy by Timothy Zahn

The Conquerors trilogy is a trilogy of science fiction novels by American writer Timothy Zahn, published between 1994 and 1996.

Set in a space opera future, the trilogy is concerned with a failed first contact that leads to an interstellar war between humanity and an alien race, the Zhirrzh (nicknamed by humans "the Conquerors"). Meanwhile, other alien races try to take advantage of the conflict between the two powers.

== Conquerors' Pride ==
Conquerors' Pride
- Author: Timothy Zahn
- Language: English
- Series: Conquerors' Trilogy
- Genre: Science Fiction/Space Opera
- Publisher: Spectra (August 1, 1994)
- Publication date: 1994
- Publication place: USA
- Media type: Paperback
- Pages: 416
- ISBN: 0-553-56892-2
- OCLC: 30999425
- Followed by: Conquerors' Heritage

Conquerors' Pride, published in 1994, is the first novel in the series. The book begins with the invasion of unknown aliens who, after a brutally efficient battle, take with them a prisoner: Commander Pheylan Cavanagh. Adam Quinn, under orders from Lord Stewart Cavanagh, later leads a team of elite fighter pilots to embark on a perilous mission to rescue Commander Cavanagh. Books 1 and 2 in the trilogy were released in hardcover, paperback and audio cassette, while Conquerors' Legacy (Book 3) was only released in hardcover and paperback.

== Conquerors' Heritage ==
Conquerors' Heritage
- Author: Timothy Zahn
- Language: English
- Series: Conquerors' Trilogy
- Genre: Science fiction
- Publisher: Spectra
- Publication date: 1 August 1995
- Publication place: USA
- Media type: Paperback
- Pages: 368
- ISBN: 0-553-56772-1
- OCLC: 32938651
- Preceded by: Conquerors' Pride
- Followed by: Conquerors' Legacy

Conquerors' Heritage, published in 1995, is the second installment of the trilogy. Unlike the first novel, it is told from the viewpoint of the Zhirrzh.

In the book, the human Pheylan Cavanagh has escaped his captors. He soon believes his only hope is to convince the Zhirrzh authorities that the humans were not responsible for the war. Meanwhile, his former captor Thrr-gilag struggles with the disgrace of permitting Cavanagh's escape; and gradually comes to believe that his own people are weakened by their customs. It is herein revealed that the Zhirrzh preserve the psyches of their dead as holographic 'Elders', and that the injury done to these by radio transmission, has provoked most of their interstellar wars.

== Conquerors' Legacy ==
Conquerors' Legacy
- Author: Timothy Zahn
- Language: English
- Series: Conquerors' Trilogy
- Genre: Science fiction
- Publisher: Spectra
- Publication date: 1996
- Publication place: USA
- Media type: Paperback
- Pages: 496
- ISBN: 0-553-57562-7
- OCLC: 35010708
- Preceded by: Conquerors' Heritage

Conquerors' Legacy, published in 1996, is the third installment of the trilogy, and is told from multiple viewpoints.

In the novel, Lord Stewart Cavanagh looks for a defense against the Zhirrzh race's planned attack. Individuals from both sides of the war discover the foundations for it, a tragic misunderstanding that threatens to destroy both sides.
