= Sharmila Devar =

American actress

- Occupation: Actress
- Years active: 1999–present

Sharmila Devar is an American actress. She is best known for her roles Lata in the NBC comedy series, Outsourced, and as Lauren Wellman, one of President's assistants, in the ABC political drama, Scandal.

== Career ==
Devar graduated from the University of Chicago with her Bachelor's degree in economics. She also guest starred on Gilmore Girls, Grey's Anatomy, and Private Practice.

== Filmography ==
=== Film ===
Year	Title	Role	Notes
2003	Eastern Son	Sara	Short
2004	Seen	-	Short
2008	Shades of Ray	Shirmeen	
2013	Happy and You Know It	Devika	Short
2015	Playhouse of Cards	Lynda	Short
2017	Raksha	Shilpa	Short
2019	The Kiss-Off	Molly	Short
2019	Marriage Story	Carly	
2022	Father Stu	Los Angeles Nurse	
2022	The World's Worst Porn Film	Sasha	Short

=== Television ===
Year	Title	Role	Notes
1999	Chicago Hope	Nurse #1	Episode: "Team Play"
2000	The Others	ER Nurse/Angela (voice)	Episode: "Luciferous" & "The Ones That Lie in Wait"
2000	Gilmore Girls	Harvard Rep	Episode: "Rory's Birthday Parties"
2003	Strong Medicine	X-Ray Tech	Episode: "Addicted to Love"
2005	Grey's Anatomy	Female Intern	Episode: "If Tomorrow Never Comes"
2005	Monk	Cashier	Episode: "Mr. Monk Goes Home Again"
2005	Joey	Renata	Episode: "Joey and the ESL"
2007-08	The Young and the Restless	Reporter	Regular Cast
2008	House	Nurse	Episode: "House's Head"
2008	The Mentalist	Meera	Episode: "Red Hair and Silver Tape"
2010-11	Outsourced	Lata	Recurring cast
2012	Private Practice	Lisa	Episode: "Georgia On My Mind"
2013	Marvin Marvin	Mrs. Conroy	Episode: "Battle of the Bands"
2013	Arrested Development	Indian Medical Student #1	Episode: "A New Start"
2013-14	Scandal	Lauren Wellman	Recurring cast: season 2-4
2014	The Thundermans	Librarian	Episode: "Phoebe's a Clone Now"
2017	Star Wars Rebels	Ursa Wren (voice)	Recurring cast: season 3-4
2020	Star Wars: The Clone Wars	Ursa Wren (voice)	Recurring cast: season 7

=== Video games ===
Year	Title	Role	Notes
2012	Diablo III	Additional Voices (voice)	
2014	Diablo III: Reaper of Souls	Additional Voices (voice)	
