= Thrawn: Alliances =

2018 novel by Timothy Zahn

Star Wars: Thrawn: Alliances
- The primary cover art of Thrawn: Alliances
- Author: Timothy Zahn
- Language: English
- Series: Star Wars: Thrawn trilogy
- Genre: Adventure; War; Science fiction
- Publisher: Del Rey Books
- Publication date: July 24, 2018
- Publication place: United States
- Pages: 496 (paperback)
- ISBN: 9781787460645
- Preceded by: Star Wars: Thrawn
- Followed by: Thrawn: Treason

Thrawn: Alliances is a 2018 Star Wars novel by Timothy Zahn, published on July 24, 2018 by Del Rey Books. It continues the chronicles of Grand Admiral Thrawn, a character that Zahn originated in his Heir to the Empire trilogy published in 1991–1993. It is the sequel to Zahn's Star Wars: Thrawn novel, the second installment of the newer Thrawn trilogy, and the ninth Thrawn novel overall. A sequel, Thrawn: Treason, was released in July 2019.

== Development ==
At the New York Comic Con in 2017, Timothy Zahn, the author of the first eight Thrawn novels, announced that he had been working on a sequel to the 2017 Thrawn novel. He said that the book was actually finished and had been turned in a few weeks prior. @DelReyStarWars, the official Star Wars Del Rey Twitter account, published a comment that read: "Thrawn is back. And he's bringing Vader with him. Coming summer 2018." The book was initially planned for release on June 26, 2018, but was later delayed to July 24, 2018.

Zahn said about coming back to writing about Thrawn: "Thrawn is a great character to write. It was really like I was never away from the last books I did. He’s a fun character to deal with..."

== Plot ==
Thrawn: Alliances focuses on Thrawn's partnership with Darth Vader, whom he meets at the conclusion of Thrawn. In the novel, Grand Admiral Thrawn and Darth Vader are sent on a mission to Batuu to explore a disturbance in the Force felt by Emperor Palpatine. The mission is more than that however, as Thrawn's split loyalties between the Empire and his native people the Chiss and Vader's past as a Jedi require a test of loyalty for both of the characters. The book also features flashbacks to a Clone Wars conflict featuring Thrawn and Anakin Skywalker on the same planet several years ago. Additionally, Padmé Amidala is featured, investigating the disappearance of an old ally.

The novel also introduces the fictional Grysk species, which later return in Thrawn: Treason.

== Reception ==
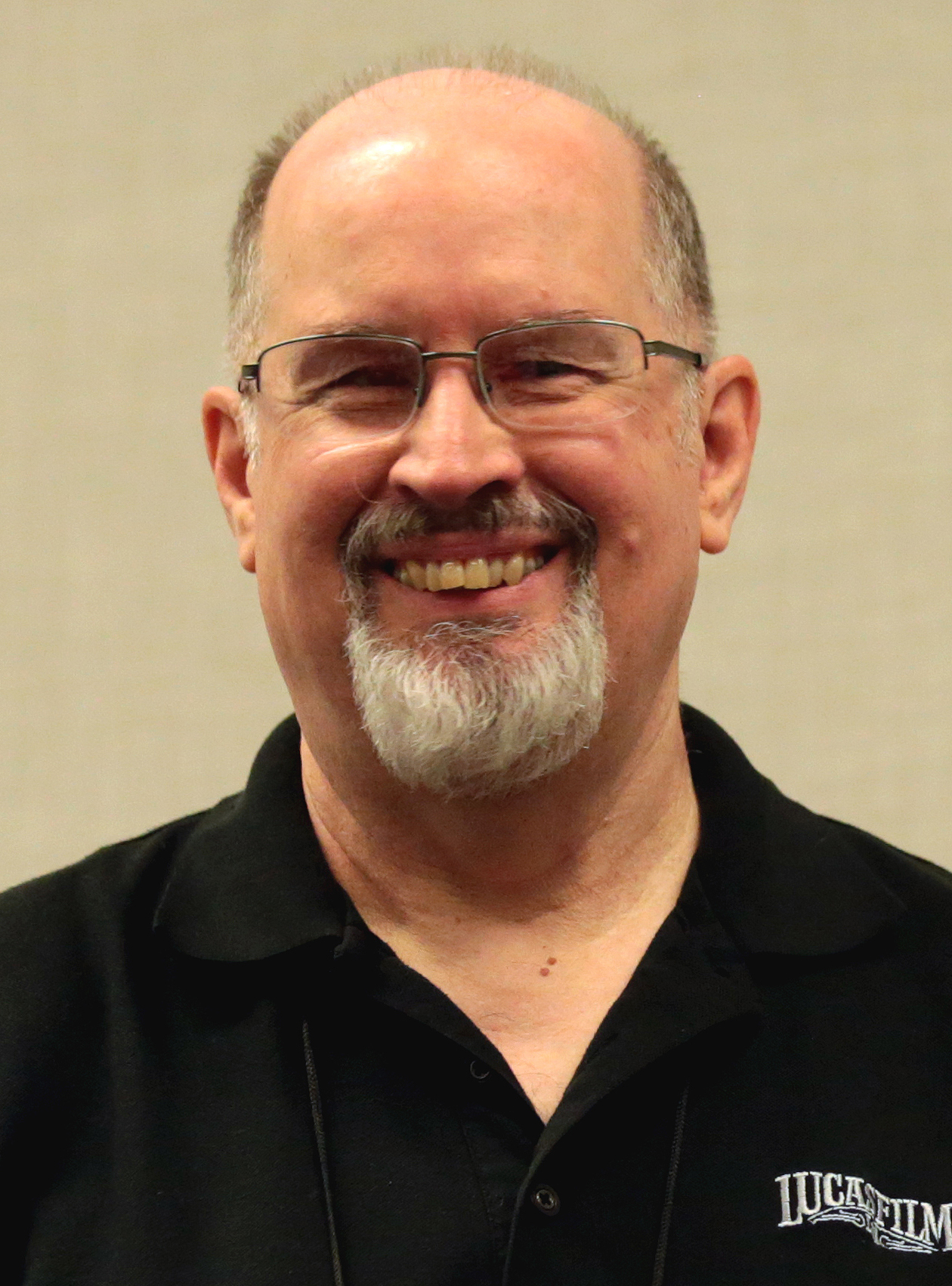
Timothy Zahn authored Thrawn: Alliances

Thrawn: Alliances topped The New York Times Best Seller list for Hardcover Fiction on the August 12, 2018 edition, and stayed there the next week. It placed second in Hardcover Fiction for the August 6, 2018 edition of Publishers Weekly's list of the week's best-sellers.

Megan Crouse of Den of Geek wrote:"The sequel moves a lot faster and has a more energetic central dynamic than the first book. It’s a science fiction beach read in the best way, brisk and amusing, with some cool additions to the Star Wars galaxy."

In 2019, Alliances won a Dragon Award for Best Media Tie-In Novel.

== See also ==
- List of Star Wars books, the list of novels published in the Star Wars series
