= Thrawn: Treason =

2019 novel by Timothy Zahn

- The primary cover art of Thrawn: Treason
- Author: Timothy Zahn
- Language: English
- Series: Star Wars: Thrawn trilogy
- Genre: Adventure; War; Science fiction
- Publisher: Del Rey Books
- Publication date: July 23, 2019
- Publication place: United States
- Pages: 448
- ISBN: 9781984820983
- Followed by: Thrawn Ascendancy

Thrawn: Treason is a 2019 Star Wars novel by Timothy Zahn, published on July 23, 2019, by Del Rey Books. It continues the chronicles of Grand Admiral Thrawn, a character that Zahn originated in his Heir to the Empire trilogy published in 1991–1993. It is the sequel to Zahn's Thrawn: Alliances novel, the third installment of the newer Thrawn trilogy, and the tenth Thrawn novel overall.

== Development ==
In December 2018, Lucasfilm and Del Rey Books announced that Timothy Zahn, the author of the first nine Thrawn novels, was writing a sequel to the Star Wars: Thrawn and Thrawn: Alliances, comprising a new Thrawn trilogy. Zahn said about writing Thrawn: Treason: "I'm playing both sides of the chessboard, [nor do] I want stupid villains or stupid heroes. That's boring. I want both sides to be smart within their own parameters, within the range of what they know, and so it's a matter of both sides are clever. I usually go in knowing which side is going to win and I work in that direction."

== Reception ==
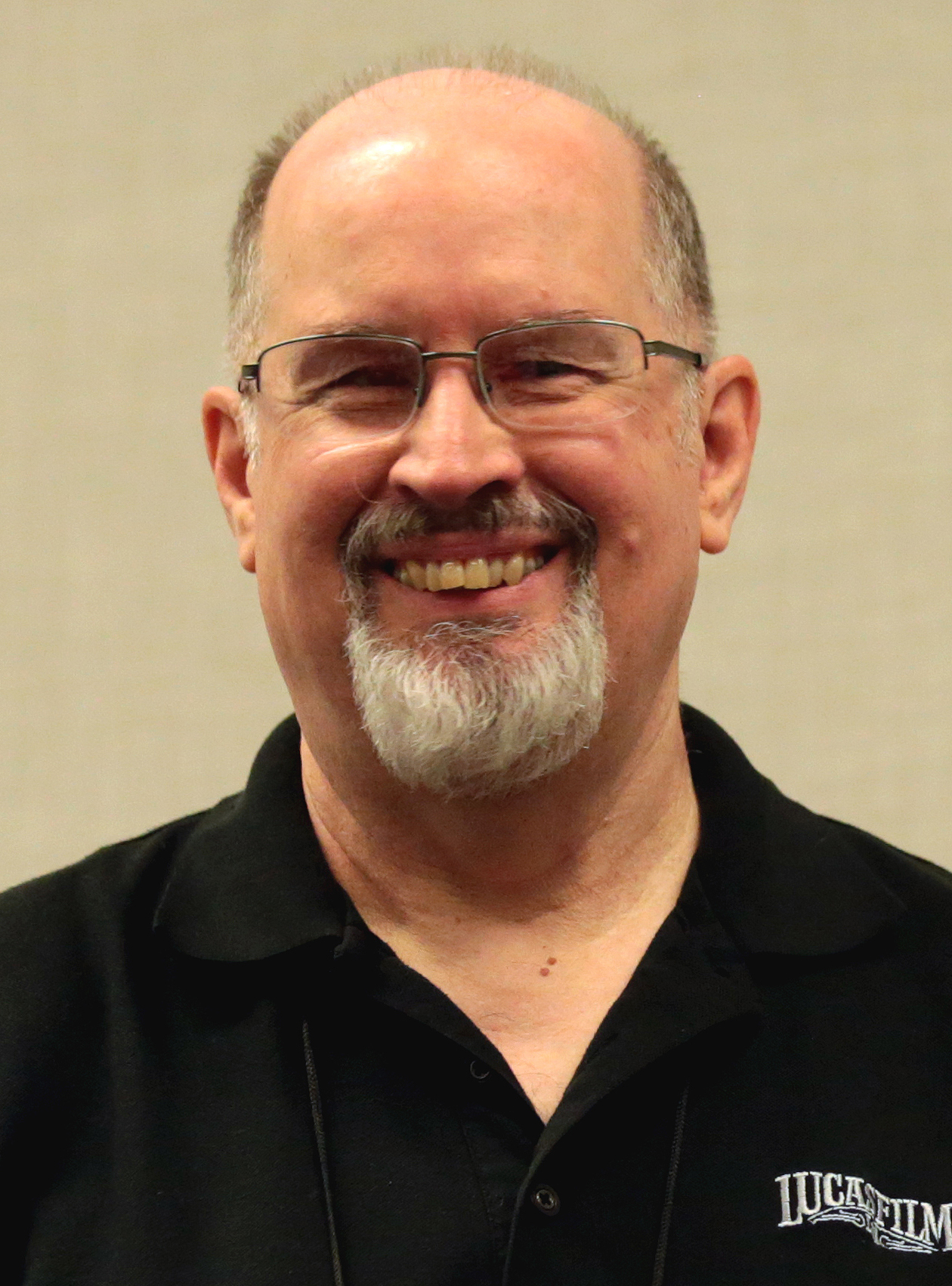
Timothy Zahn authored Thrawn: Treason.

Thrawn: Treason placed The New York Times Best Seller list for Hardcover Fiction on the August 11, 2019 edition, and stayed there for three weeks, placing fifth.

Megan Crouse of Den of Geek wrote that Treason is "a solidly constructed story that includes a lot of almost-explored threads worthy of their own novels."

== See also ==
- Star Wars: Thrawn, the first book in the trilogy
- Thrawn: Alliances, the second book in the trilogy
- Timothy Zahn, the creator of Grand Admiral Thrawn and writer of this book
- Grand Admiral Thrawn, the main character of this book
- List of Star Wars books, the list of novels published in the Star Wars series
