= Timothy Zahn =

American science fiction author (born 1951)

- Zahn at Galaxy Con San Jose in 2026
- Born: September 1, 1951 (age 75); Chicago, Illinois, U.S.
- Education: Michigan State University; University of Illinois
- Occupation: Author
- Writing career
- Genres: Science fiction, fantasy
- Notable works: Thrawn trilogy (1991–1993); Thrawn Trilogy (2017–2019); Thrawn Ascendancy (2020–2021)

Timothy Zahn (born September 1, 1951) is an American writer of science fiction and fantasy. He is known best for his prolific collection of Star Wars books, chiefly the Thrawn trilogy, and has published several other series of sci-fi and fantasy novels of his own original creation, in addition to many works of short fiction. His books have been credited with helping revive interest in Star Wars after the franchise's movie branch ran into trouble with profitability and cross-generational interest.

Zahn grew up in Lombard, Illinois, and attended Glenbard East High School in Lombard. He has been a fan of sci-fi since he was a child. He attended Michigan State University, before working towards a doctorate in physics at the University of Illinois.

== Career ==
Zahn's novella Cascade Point won the 1984 Hugo Award. Zahn novels also won five Dragon Awards. He is the author of the Blackcollar trilogy and the Cobra series, which includes nine novels. His work in the Star Wars Expanded Universe includes thirteen novels featuring Grand Admiral Thrawn: the Thrawn trilogy, the Hand of Thrawn duology, Outbound Flight, Choices of One, Thrawn, Thrawn: Alliances, Thrawn: Treason, and the Thrawn Ascendancy trilogy.

Lucasfilm at times used some of the more detailed Star Wars: The Roleplaying Game supplements from West End Games as references, and West End sent boxes of their sourcebooks to Zahn when he started work on a new Star Wars novel trilogy. At the time, Zahn was writing Heir to the Empire (1991), the first book in what became known as the Thrawn trilogy, and West End in turn released sourcebooks from 1992 to 1994 based on Zahn's three novels.

Zahn also wrote the young adult Dragonback series and the Conquerors trilogy. In 2014 Zahn collaborated with David Weber on the Manticore Ascendant series set within the Honorverse.

=== Star Wars expanded universe ===
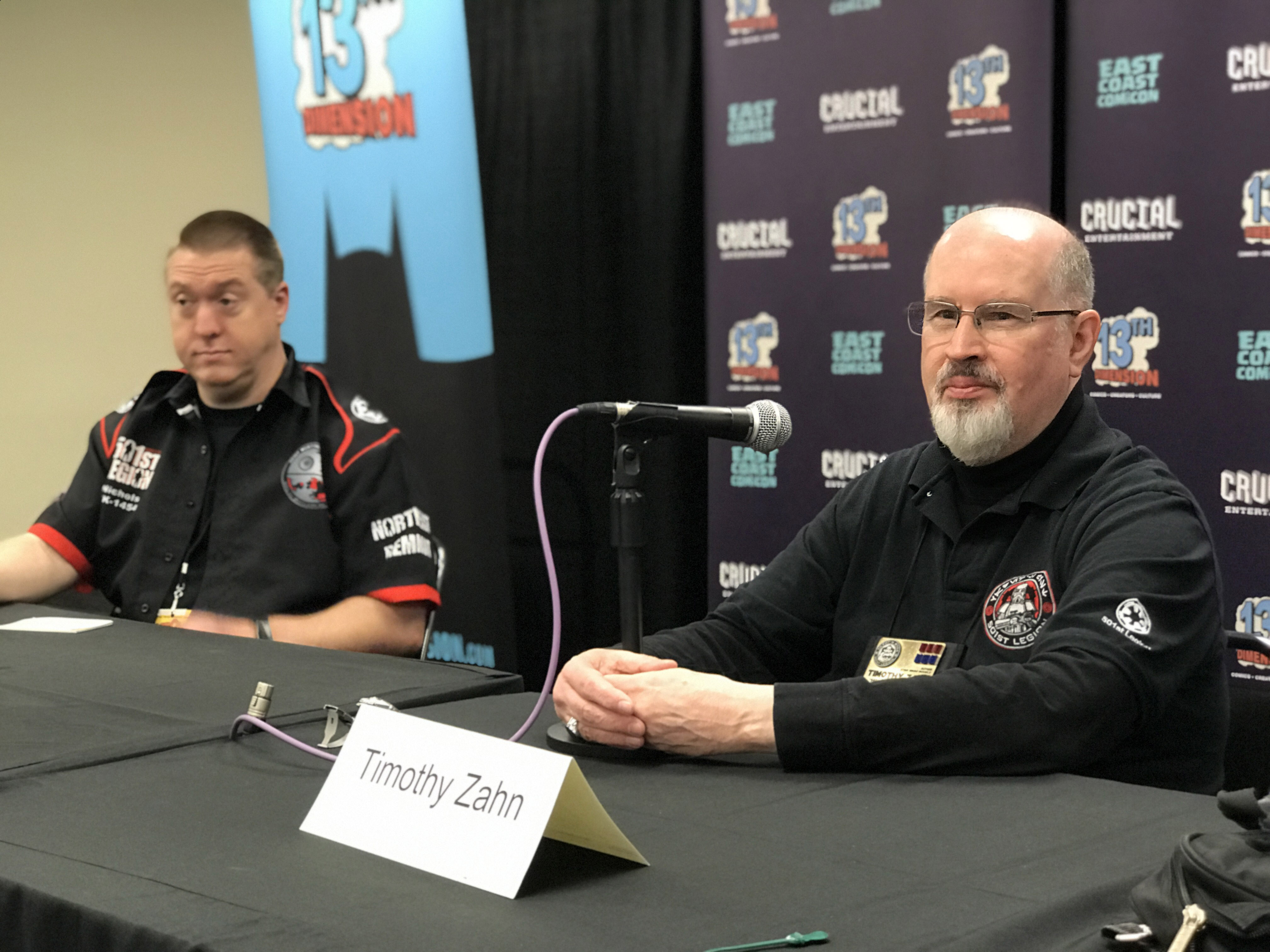
Zahn, right, during a Q&A discussion at the 2018 East Coast Comicon in New Jersey

The Thrawn trilogy marked a revival in the fortunes of the Star Wars franchise, bringing it widespread attention for the first time in years; all three Thrawn trilogy novels made The New York Times Best Seller list, and set the stage and tone for most of the franchise's expanded universe content.

In 2023, Dave Filoni confirmed during the Star Wars Celebration Europe that Zahn served as a creative consultant for the Disney+ miniseries Ahsoka in order to assist the creative team in writing Thrawn correctly, as Filoni felt that only Zahn could advise them with the "right" way to adapt Thrawn as the character's creator.

== Bibliography ==
=== Highlights ===
- The Blackcollar series
- Thrawn series
