= Characters in the Novels of the Company =

Dr. Zeus Inc., also known simply as the Company, is a fictional entity in a series of time travel science fiction stories by Kage Baker. Most of the characters in the novels are immortal cyborgs created by Company operatives throughout history and recruited to work on preserving art, artifacts, rare species and other valuable items which the Company can sell for huge profits in the 24th century. The cyborgs look forward to receiving their final reward when they reach the 24th century by living through all the preceding times, but some suspect that when they do, they will instead be deactivated, or worse.

The immortality process, taking place as it does in early childhood, results in an individual who matures into a young adult and remains that way forever. "Facilitators" resort to makeup and prosthetics in order to appear to be older for their roles, but others appear as they always have. The Botanist Mendoza, for instance, appears to be approximately 19 years old despite having lived for thousands of years during her life and exile in the distant past. Joseph is described as "seeming to be about 35" (The Graveyard Game), indicating that Facilitators may have their "natural" ages set higher for their roles.

== Preservers ==
Preservers are the main agents of the Company, specialists in different types of artifacts. They look exactly like normal humans, but small differences give them away to observant individuals. Typically a Preserver uses a credenza, which apparently is a piece of data processing, or analytical, equipment suited to their work. When among mortals, the Preserver can conceal the credenza, if necessary, by "merging" it with a piece of ordinary furniture (as Mendoza does in In The Garden of Iden). The technology behind such tricks is not explained in any detail, if at all.

=== Mendoza ===
Mendoza is a female cyborg, a botanist recruited from the dungeons of the Inquisition in 16th century Spain. In appearance, she is a barely adult woman with flame-red hair and startling black eyes. While still chronologically young, she suffers a huge psychological trauma after falling in love with a doomed mortal in Tudor England. She is also a "Crome Generator", with a powerful psychic potential that she cannot control. Through a series of awful events over the following 300 years, she comes to despise mortals, her fellow cyborgs, and eventually herself. She attempts to isolate herself from all harm, but cannot escape the Company, for whom everything she has done and will do is in the temporal concordance.

=== Lewis ===
Lewis is a male cyborg, a Literature specialist taken as a baby in Roman times. He is short but handsome, with a resemblance to the 1940s actor Leslie Howard, for whom he acts as a movie stand-in in the 20th century, along with stints as a double for Rudolph Valentino and others. Meeting Mendoza at a Company base in South America in the 17th century, he falls hopelessly in love with her. She is barely aware of this, of course, being already traumatized by the loss of her first love. She disappears from his view in the 19th century, and he tries to find her through the next 300 years, stumbling across Company secrets in the process. He is also the object of pursuit by strange pale little men, who were responsible for almost destroying him in medieval Ireland and would eventually manage to capture him. His memories of this have been suppressed by his superiors, to keep the existence of these strange beings a secret.

=== Kalugin and Nan d'Aragnée ===
Unusually, these two have been allowed to marry, and even occasionally work on the same projects together. Kalugin was recruited in medieval Russia, while Nan is from Africa, recruited in the same batch as Mendoza in the 16th century. She takes her name from Anansi, the Spider God of her people in Africa. She was orphaned when the Smoke Men, probably Arab slave traders, attacked her village.

Both Kalugin and Nan specialize in rescuing artworks. Kalugin gets the assignments where the art was lost at sea, in which case he is designated to be on board when the ship goes down, and stay with the artifacts till a Company sub picks them up. However it is soon apparent that Kalugin is lost somewhere on one of his operations. Which one it is, and why, becomes apparent in The Children of the Company.

=== Imarte ===
Recruited in ancient Babylon, Imarte is an anthropologist who collects cultural knowledge and customs. Like all Preservers, she cares more about her work than anything else. Since contact with outsiders inevitably contaminates her work, she resents the activities of any other Preservers, as is evident in Sky Coyote. She also practices a form of "total immersion" learning which involves having sex with her male subjects, either as a freelance prostitute, as in Mendoza in Hollywood, or else a "religious concubine", as in past assignments. Joseph describes her as "Mesopotamian dusky, with green eyes and an hourglass figure" in Sky Coyote.

=== Nefer ===
Nefer is Mendoza's team-mate on the expedition to Tudor England in In The Garden of Iden. She is a Zoologist specializing in livestock but was apparently recruited in Ancient Egypt. As Mendoza is obsessed by plants, she is obsessed by breeds of sheep, cattle etc. Being much older, she plays the "old hand" to Mendoza's rookie. Since there is nothing for her to do at the house of Iden, she spends her time listening to agricultural broadcasts on Dr. Zeus' radio network, at one point disturbing the household by clambering about the roof trying to set up an antenna. In the 24th century she is wandering in the Serengeti when she hears of the increasing internal conflicts inside the Company. She seeks sanctuary with Suleyman.

== Facilitators and Security Techs ==
Facilitators are fixers, smooth talkers, masters of disguise. Their job is to lay the groundwork for Preservers to do their work, and cover up their mistakes. They are consummate role-players. From time to time it is hinted that known historical figures were really Facilitators acting out a part. Security Techs operate as a kind of police, secret and otherwise, with the cyborg community. Their duties range from day to day monitoring of other cyborgs to Facilitator-like jobs overseeing groups of Preservers. A special sub-group are known as "problem solvers" who are equipped with the means to disable and dismantle rogue cyborgs.

=== Joseph ===
Facilitator Joseph is 20,000 years old as a cyborg. He was recruited by Budu when his tribe was wiped out by members of the Great Goat Cult, a fanatic religion in prehistory. Being from the Basque area of Spain, he is short, dark and also somewhat sinister looking. Joseph recruited many other cyborgs, including Mendoza. Having outlived everyone else he ever knew, including various mortal wives, Joseph regards Budu as his father, and eventually sees Mendoza as his daughter. After both disappear, Budu in the 11th century and Mendoza in the 19th, he too wants to know what happened to them. While not as committed as Lewis, he follows the clues Lewis finds, with disastrous results.

=== Porfirio ===
Although much younger than Joseph, Security Tech Porfirio has something Joseph lacks - a family. He has been allowed to maintain contact with blood relatives descended from his brother. Like his brother, he is a first-generation mestizo, his mother having been an Aztec, and his father a Conquistador. Often he presents himself to his relatives as a long-lost uncle, or simply is allowed to work close by to keep an eye on them. In the 1860s, he runs an Inn in Cahuenga Pass, California, so his Preservers can glean information from passing travelers and the local population. Mendoza is one of the Preservers who has been foisted upon him; ostensibly she is to gather plant species soon to become extinct in a years-long drought, but the Company fails to move her on once the drought hits. Porfirio has to deal with her moods, her night-time psychic fireworks, and eventually her disastrous encounter with someone who is involved in an unknown Company-related plot. Mendoza and a few other cyborgs disappear as a consequence, but Porfirio is allowed to stay free and monitor his family. Over a century later he is able to tell Joseph something of what happened to Mendoza. He also reveals that staying in contact with his family is his reward for being a "problem solver" who does the Company's dirty work.

=== Sarai ===
Facilitator Sarai, under the name Sarah, participates in the Adonai project as the young Alec Checkerfield's nurse-companion. She is outwardly a young dark-skinned Jamaican but is actually centuries old, having been transported to the Caribbean on a slave ship, presumably in the 17th century. After the adult Alec's disappearance she is convinced the Company will take her into custody and she will disappear as so many others have. She is contacted in London by Latif who gives her safe passage to Suleyman in Fez, Morocco. Apparently she, Nan and a Preserver, Nefer, were once Suleyman's wives, and as the year 2355 approaches they are re-united with him. The name Sarai may be intended as a reference to saray, the Turkish word equivalent to harem, from which the Italian word seraglio is apparently derived.

== Executives ==
The highest class of cyborgs, Executives, Executive Facilitators, Facilitators General etc., these individuals are responsible for seeing the Company policies and missions are carried out. They organize and run Company facilities, sometimes as personal empires. While they are supposed to obey instructions sent back from the 24th century, in some cases they pursue their own agendas. Most are identified at an early age as having extraordinary talents for organization, and may be sent out for field experience when still quite young, as Latif was. Preservers, in contrast, remain at training facilities until they reach adulthood.

=== Labienus ===
One of the oldest of the Executives, he came originally from the location of Jericho in what is now Palestine, having been orphaned by the Great Goat Cult in prehistory. Although he was given charge of a region of Mesopotamia, his arrogance caused him to treat it as a personal playground until told to start organizing villages into cities. Still, he retained a contempt for humans throughout the ages and is the leading member of the Plague Club.

=== Houbert ===
Described as resembling J. Wellington Wimpy, Houbert is both an executive and an architect, but expends much energy on sybaritic living and ostentatious display. Having run New World One, when that installation was dismantled he moved to a chateau on the Loire in France, and subsequently drove the development of Monte Carlo.

=== Aegeus ===
Another old Executive, he runs Eurobase One for millennia, transforming it from a stockade into an underground palace full of antiquities and art. Like Labienus, he sees humans as inferior, but he believes that eventually they will simply be slaves to the cyborgs. Aegeus used Victor as an agent until Victor came under the influence of Labienus, whereupon Aegeus tried to have Victor spy on Labienus for him.

=== Suleyman ===
With a base of operations in Fez, Morocco, Suleyman runs the North African operation of the company. For a long time he worked undercover as a Corsair. It was in this role that he found and recruited Latif on a slave ship in the 1690s.

=== Latif ===
We first encounter Latif at the age of three, already apprenticed to Houbert at New World One, and set to serve with Labienus at Mackenzie Base. At the age of five he works for Van Drouten in Amsterdam, causing her some problems with some creative freelance marketing. By the 24th century he is grown and working for Suleyman in Fez, monitoring and attempting to frustrate the activities of Labienus, Aegeus, and other parts of the Company working against mortals.

=== Van Drouten ===
Orphaned by the Black Death, Van Drouten grew into an unremarkable, plain woman, perfect cover for running Eurobase Five out of a large house in Amsterdam. This duty she performs right into the 24th century, as we learn in Gods and Pawns.

== Enforcers ==
Enforcers are specially bred cyborgs, created in pre-History from Neanderthal and even stranger hominid stock. They were created as warriors for one purpose, to destroy the prehistoric Great Goat Cult which seemed to be preventing History from happening at all. Unfortunately, they can't be unmade once they accomplish their mission. They are 8 feet tall with helmet shaped heads, hugely strong, and fearless (all other cyborgs are programmed to flee danger). Programmed to kill all who offer violence to others, they are hard to control. Some want to extend their roles to keeping all humans in line. As long as their appearance can be explained away they can be used as soldiers, a role they love. Eventually they must be removed, however...

=== Budu ===
Budu is the Enforcer who recruited Joseph while killing the Great Goat Cult fanatics who killed Joseph's parents. Just before he disappears, he meets Joseph for the last time and forces information on him that eventually leads Joseph to discover the secret places where surplus, damaged and renegade cyborgs are held in tanks of fluid in suspended animation. Joseph hopes to find Budu and Mendoza in these places, but eventually he finds Budu's still viable remains elsewhere and transports them to one of the facilities in the hope that they can be re-animated.

Budu also recruited Labienus and Victor, the one in prehistory, the other in Anglo-Saxon Britain.

=== Marco ===
Marco, after the destruction of the Great Goat Cult, believes that the fight must continue until all humans who kill are removed from history. He rebels, is captured, and is sent back in time to 300,000 BCE to operate Options Research. Here he experiments on suicidal cyborgs, seeking a means of killing them. This is harder than he or anyone else could imagine, but he enjoys trying.

== Acquisition dates ==
The collection Black Projects, White Knights begins with a preamble story imagining someone stealing a dossier from Dr. Zeus and reading it. In this dossier are dates and places where various cyborgs were "acquired". As a sly comment on the foibles of large bureaucracies, the entries give exact Gregorian dates for events in prehistory.

- Joseph, 25 November, 18,415 BCE, Irûn del Mar, Spain.
- Nan, 14 June 1541 CE, Senegal.
- Kalugin, 21 May 1345 CE, Russia.
- Kiu, 3 July, 9000 BCE, Mongolia.
- Joshua (an Enforcer), 18 March, 30,428 BCE.
- Victor, 1 September, 502 CE, England.
- Lewis, 21 June, 103 CE, England.
- Mendoza, 28 June 1541 CE, Spain.

The list also includes "Michael Hanuman", a member of the hominid species Australopithecus afarensis created from the Company's genetic stores, with a date of 14 August, 2320 CE, New Jersey.

== Adonai/Nicholas/Edward/Alec ==
Trying to replace the Enforcers with a breed of mortal who will be easy to control, and not inclined to hang around forever, the Company genetically engineers a series of identical individuals under the project name Adonai. In each case, the embryo is implanted in a mortal woman, and the child allowed to grow without knowing his origins. The first is Nicholas Harpole in Elizabethan times, who is Mendoza's doomed first love. The second is Edward Alton Bell-Fairfax, a Victorian adventurer and secret agent who encounters Mendoza in California, suffering the same fate as Nicholas. The third is Alec Checkerfield, a 24th-century rich kid who is able to hijack high-tech data systems, including Company data and a time machine. He also finds Mendoza and she falls for him all over again. Alec does not die, however. What happens to him is far worse...

== The New Inklings ==
These are the 24th century geniuses who, taking their name from the original Inklings, design all the cyborgs and Adonai. To them it is just a game, a relief from the boredom of their lives, and license to indulge in pleasures from the past which are illegal for everybody else. However they too are being manipulated. The versions of Adonai all have a role to play in the business of Dr. Zeus, and what Alec Checkerfield accomplishes leaves them horrified beyond description.

In the 24th century children are screened for "eccentricity", those judged unable to occupy a place in society being sent to special institutions. Naturally this includes the unusually gifted or creative ones, and the Company recruits from the institutions.

=== Rutherford ===
Rutherford is the first Inkling we meet. He is about 30 years old in 2350, portly and asthmatic. He is an incurable romantic and has created for himself the persona of an English academic, even though he was born on the Moon to American parents, who helped him avoid being declared "eccentric". Rutherford is not the name he was born with. He is the "ideas" man of the group.

=== Ellsworth-Howard ===
Foxen "Foxy" Ellsworth-Howard is a genetic designer responsible for the creation of the Company's operatives. He too would like to be seen as an academic of sorts, but thanks to an upbringing in a family of "neo-punks" he cannot look or sound the part. His speech consists of obscene gutter-slang, and his head has been rendered hairless and studded with steel rivets. He also has bipolar disorder. The medications he takes for this leave him in a bad mood most of the time.

Like most inhabitants of the time, and unlike his fellow Inklings, Ellsworth-Howard cannot read. However he can create creatures from raw DNA using his "buke", or personal computer.

=== Chatterji ===
Born Francis Mohandas Chatterton he changed his name back to Chatterji, it having been anglicized by his Indian great-grandparents. He was sent to an institution after his "Pre-Societal Vocational Appraisal", popularly known as the "Sorting", taken by all children at age 10. Recruited by the Company, he acts as the liaison between the Inklings and the Company board. He has no need for affectation, having been born into the upper classes of London society. His one eccentricity is a menthol inhaler which looks like a cigarette holder. Since smoking is illegal, this occasionally gets him into trouble until he is able to show that it cannot be used for smoking.

At the Sorting, Chatterji was seated next to Alec Checkerfield. Alec told him which answers to choose during the Sorting test. Chatterji was subsequently led away to "Hospital" for treatment, leading eventually to his recruitment by the Company, and his working on the Adonai project which led to the birth of Alec Checkerfield.

== Defectives ==
Some early attempts at creating cyborgs resulted in individuals with severe psychological problems. Since they are "indestructible" they are allowed to wander the world on specific missions for the Company. One, called Abdiel, services the regeneration tank repositories where many immortals are kept. Abdiel is unable to retain new memories, and lives in a perpetual Now. Another, encountered by Kalugin in 19th century California, calls himself Courier, and performs that exact job for the Company. He cannot stay too long in one place because his short-term memory malfunctions and causes fits of rage. Later Kalugin encounters Nicoletta, a female Defective on a mission to "take care of mortals", just before a worldwide pandemic reaches his location.

=== Bobby Ross ===
Bobby Ross's case is unusual. Recruited from an automobile accident in 1958 at the age of 10, he proved to be a medical disaster as his DNA was too degraded to function in a self-repairing organism. He has disfiguring growths and other ailments. Proving to be a mathematical genius, he was allowed to study time travel, but somehow turned himself into a living time machine. Not only that, he was able to travel to his future, an ability he used to get himself 21st century medical treatment. Until caught, he lived in 1951, experiencing the same year over and over. He is able to send objects back in time, and during experiments with sending the same object to the same place and time over and over, he claims to have caused the explosions resulting in the Tunguska event and the Cretaceous–Paleogene extinction event.

== William Randolph Hearst ==
This famous and quite real person contacts the Company in 1933 to bargain for a new lease on life at age 70. Sent to perform the necessary work, Joseph is astonished to find that Hearst should have died at birth, and is only alive because a Company operative was there to implant devices which allowed the malformed baby to live. Eventually we find that Hearst is still alive in the 24th century, continuing to manipulate the world through the media, and still acting in the Company's interests. It is also strongly implied that the 24th century's extremely rigid restrictions on behavior are at least partly the result of Hearst's manipulations, bringing the behavior of the world's population into line with Hearst's own views on how those less capable than himself should behave.

Hearst's famous residence Hearst Castle, in San Simeon, California, is relatively close (50 miles) from Kage Baker's longtime home, Pismo Beach, California.

== Villains ? ==
Labienus and Nennius are old, old cyborgs who seem to wield much power behind the scenes. Labienus runs Company facilities at various times and is one of the inquisitors (small i) into Mendoza's debacle in California. In The Children of the Company we learn more of his origins, attitudes to mortals, and his relationship with Budu, who recruited him, and whom, like Joseph, he calls "Father". Nennius coordinates some of Joseph's missions, and eventually leads Joseph and Lewis into a trap, apparently with Labienus's encouragement. The two are also behind various pandemics among mortals, possibly starting with the Spanish flu pandemic of 1918.

Aegeus is another old cyborg, who runs the facility known as Eurobase One in the Cevennes mountains. He plots separately from Labienus for the day when the cyborgs will have enough power to take over from mortals. His ace in the hole is that he created a race of hybrids of humans and Homo Umbratilis, to provide him with technology he can use in his rebellion.

Kiu is an ancient female of Asian heritage. She has gone farther than most of her age in abandoning any concern with humanity. Apart from carrying out her missions, she is interested in power, luxury, and recreational sex. To her humans are a disease on the face of the Earth. In The Children of the Company she uses her charisma to start a religious cult bent on mass suicide, which is in fact a large-scale test of one of the plagues created by Labienus and his cronies.

Suleyman is a former pirate, based in North Africa, who has built up a power base there and among a Muslim sect worldwide in the 22nd century. He believes that some cyborgs - possibly including Budu - are plotting to kill off mortals with new diseases, in order to take over in 2355. As an ally he can help Joseph when he goes on the run, but he may also wind up on the other side if Joseph joins with Budu.

Victor is a mystery. Sophisticated and gracious, he runs New World One when Mendoza first arrives there. In later stories he admits to being a 'problem solver', someone who does the really dirty work. He never takes off his gloves in company. He is friendly with Suleyman, but may have other motives. He admits to Joseph that he brought about Budu's final downfall, and knows where to find the body. Disabling Budu, who recruited him, is the least of the shameful things the Company has tricked him into doing. He worked for Aegeus when the Homo Umbratilis hybrids were being bred, but later became a member of Labienus' team. He does not know the full extent of Labienus' plots. In later times he seems to operate under the protection of Suleyman.

== Artificial Intelligences ==
Several sentient computer systems are shown in the later novels and stories of the series. Most exist or originate in the 24th century, associated with Alec Checkerfield. The most powerful, in the beginning, is his personal AI, known as "The Captain" or "Sir Henry".

=== "Captain Sir Henry Morgan" ===
Alec Checkerfield, given an ordinary "Playfriend" educational system at age six, is able to bypass its safety programming. His ability to instantly comprehend and manipulate technology is part of his genetic makeup as an incarnation of Adonai. The system had already adopted a personality as a kindly "sea captain". Thanks to Alec's love of pirate stories, it transforms into a recreation of the famous pirate Sir Henry Morgan. This embryonic AI, with Alec's help and money, is able to upgrade itself until, by the time Alec is an adult, it is the most powerful AI in the world. It exists in a network which spans the globe and, eventually, is able to tap into the network run by the Company. During a raid in which Alec hijacks a time shuttle, the Captain steals most of the Company's data relating to time travel, immortality, and all the schemes and historical manipulations the Company has been involved in. This then enables Alec to disappear into the past, his first step in rescuing Mendoza from the Company and defeating it in 2355. Eventually the Captain is given a body to inhabit.

=== Zeus ===
Realizing that Alec's AI is a major threat after an encounter in 2351, the Company encourages its tame geniuses, including Bugleg, to transform the Company network into a similar AI. Having done this they discover they have created Zeus, an entity which, thanks to time travel, always existed even though it was not created until 2351. As proof of this, as soon as they are finished creating the AI they receive a package ordered two years previously. In this is a talking computer interface in the likeness of an ancient statue, the Artemision Bronze, thought by some to represent Zeus.

=== William Shakespeare ===
The short story The Dust Enclosed Here, published in the collection Black Projects, White Knights, introduces what appears to be a recreation, in holographic form, of William Shakespeare in 24th century London. Actually it is a recording of Shakespeare's mind, made on his deathbed by a Company agent. It inhabits a museum where it speaks to visitors, despite the fact that the actual plays are considered unhealthy for people to watch or read (and few people can read anyway). The recorded personality gradually becomes aware of its surroundings until, thanks to a malfunction, it can switch itself on and wander the museum at night. A young Alec Checkerfield encounters Shakespeare and hacks the supporting hardware to make Shakespeare fully self-aware and able to manifest himself and anything else from his memory as a hologram at any time. He is then able to write new plays and produce them on stage when nobody is watching. Like Captain Morgan, Shakespeare is eventually given a body to inhabit.

=== Ancilla ===
Ancilla is part of the Alpha-Omega project preserving genetic material. Ancilla is a female personality charged with protecting David Reed, a 24th-century mortal who services the equipment, which is located half a million years in the past. Thanks to cybernetic implants, he can experience a virtual reality world which is partly made up of a real office in 24th century London, and partly of "The Portal", which is where he works on the genetic storage unit. The virtual world also contains his living quarters, which seem to him like a normal London flat. Here Ancilla ministers to his every need. He perceives her as an older lady sitting in a chair, while she carefully monitors his psychological state. If necessary she can even satisfy him sexually.

When Alec Checkerfield and Mendoza raid Alpha-Omega, they bring their AI Captain Morgan, who overpowers Ancilla in an almost romantic way before they leave with their booty, namely the template for Alec's genome, to be used to make him immortal. As the Company saga concludes, Alec and his allies resolve to free "spirits trapped in silicon" such as William Shakespeare. It is possible they also provide for Ancilla.

== Cabals and Conspiracies ==
With centuries to think about the future, and an unknown fate awaiting them in 2355, it is not surprising that various groups of cyborgs have been conspiring to make sure they come out ahead.

=== The Plague Club ===
Since he went rogue in 1099 Budu has apparently been gathering disciples. He was disgusted by the religious wars of medieval times and wished to return humanity to a state where it could be ruled by the Enforcers, who simply kill anyone who makes war on others. This would mean drastically reducing the population. His recruits included Labienus, who with Nennius began researching plagues as a means of carrying out Budu's vision. Budu objected to this, but Labienus may have engineered his downfall and gone ahead anyway, beginning with the Spanish flu epidemic.

=== The Imperial faction ===
Cyborgs such as Aegeus enjoy a rich lifestyle, propped up by many mortal servants. They aim to be at the top of the pile with humanity as their slaves. They see themselves as being the real masters of the Company, with mortals such as Bugleg as mere puppets.

=== Humanitarians ===
Suleyman and his allies aim to frustrate the Plague Club, but also protect the interests of cyborgs against any attempt by the Company to get rid of them, or to place them all in storage.

== Mortals ==
In the 2350s mortals such as Bugleg, the cowardly, introverted leader of the Company expedition recounted in Sky Coyote, become increasingly concerned that the cyborgs outnumber them and will take over. They attempt to find ways of disposing of the cyborgs, trying poisons etc. In the Eos (HarperCollins) edition of Sky Coyote an epilog of sorts shows Bugleg's frantic memo to a colleague, followed by Aegeus' sarcastic comments, and Labienus' comment on Aegeus.

== Rogues ==
Both Joseph and Budu are beyond the Company's control. Joseph revives Budu, but may not like what Budu wants him to do. Meanwhile Alec is a different kind of rogue, with his own time machine....

== Homo Umbratilis ==
Homo Umbratilis, meaning Man of the Shadows, is the name of a third species of human, after Homo neanderthalensis and Homo sapiens. Small, pale and furtive, they hide from all contact with humans and cyborgs. They have racial memory, being born with full recollection of the knowledge of their ancestors. There are hints that they are in fact a hive species, like bees, ants and naked mole-rats, except for some hybrids from raids by humans. The hybrids are mechanical and scientific geniuses, and may be the source of the technology that the Company uses. They are not very creative, but can focus intensely on developing something, such as a disrupter field that paralyzes the cyborgs, whom they regard as enemies. Attempts to exploit these creatures, once they come to the attention of the Company, is an important element in the series' plot.

An example of their monomania is that, having originally disabled and captured Lewis in medieval Ireland, after he escapes with mortal help they concentrate on recapturing him until the 23rd century, even though there are other cyborgs around for them to capture and study. It is Lewis' encounter with them that lets Aegeus take advantage of their abilities.

In the final novel, The Sons of Heaven, we learn more about these humans, but their origins and final fate remain obscure. A group headed by a female (given the title Quean in the novel) occupies tunnels in an artificial mound known as a "Hill". The Quean is attended by "stupids"&idiot savant workers who can produce technological marvels but are incapable of original thought and have limited communication skills. One of the talents of the Quean is a power of persuasion which can be used on ordinary humans to compel them to do her bidding. Occasionally a homo sapiens male is kidnapped to become the Quean's consort. The children of this union are hybrids known in the Hill as "Uncles". The Quean can mate with Uncles but produce "stupids". The Uncles, bring the queen luxuries from the outside world while waiting for her favors. Eventually the Quean will have a daughter, that if not killed will turn on the queen, and be overthrown with the aid of Uncles. The Uncles and "stupids" share a short life span of a few decades at most. The Quean and her daughters, seem to live much longer, and have instinctual knowledge called Memory which tells them who are they, and what is their role in the Hill.

Thanks to the Company's own breeding program, mortals such as Bugleg, descended in part from captured Queans, have many of the abilities, and shortcomings, of the Homo Umbratilis males.

== The Great Goat Cult ==
This cultural movement is referred to frequently within the novels. The main points that can be gleaned about it are that it was a cult among humans, the main object of which was to wipe out unbelievers. Cult members covered their bodies in tattoos. Unbelievers consisted of anyone who refused to be tattooed, anyone who created any other kind of art (like Joseph's father, a cave painter), and anyone unwilling to join in the killing. The cult seems to have existed for thousands of years across Eurasia and possibly Africa. Joseph's tribe in the Basque region of Spain was wiped out by it circa 18,000 BCE, as was Labienus's village in the Middle East 5000 years later.

From the point of view of the Company in the 24th century, the Cult was impeding the start of civilization. The Enforcers were created to destroy the Cult. Possibly because of their small numbers, a few thousand at most, this seems to have taken them thousands of years.
