= Mendoza (name) =

Mendoza is a Basque surname, also occurring as a place name.

The name Mendoza means "cold mountain", derived from the Basque words mendi (mountain) and (h)otz (cold) + definite article -a (Mendoza being mendi+(h)otza). The original Basque form with an affricate sibilant (/ts/, Basque spelling ⟨tz⟩) evolved in Spanish to the current form.

== History ==
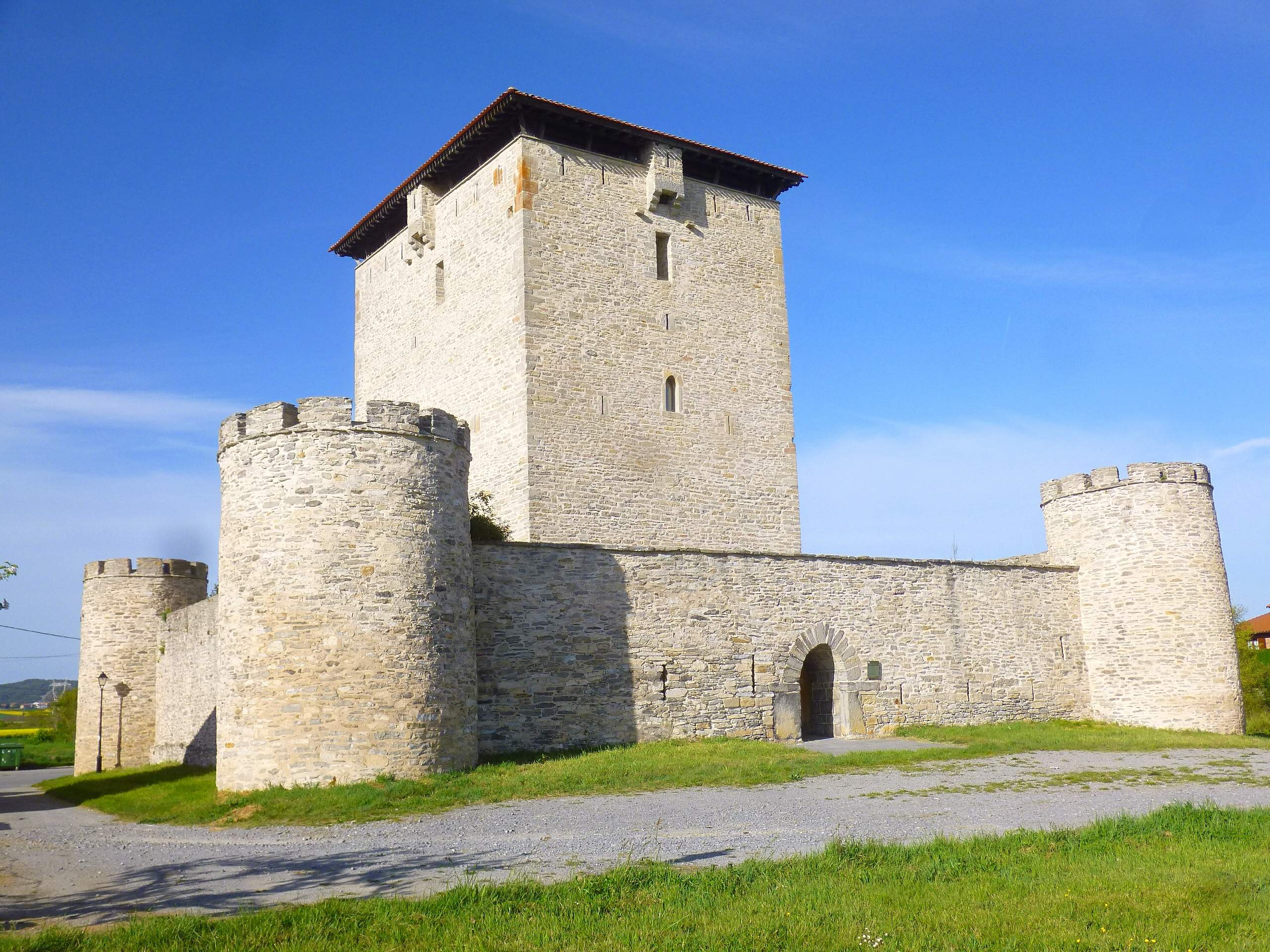
The Towerhouse of Mendoza (Basque Country, Spain). Built in the thirteenth century as a residence of the House of Mendoza.

Records of the Mendoza family can be traced back to the Middle Ages in Alava, in the Basque Country, Spain. It is believed that the family descends from the ancient Lords of Llodio (Alava), where the original patronymic house would have been. The Mendozas belonged to the local nobility, and branched out into different family lines early on.

The most distinguished branch of the family originated in what nowadays is known as the village of Mendoza, near Vitoria-Gasteiz, Basque Country; the village takes its name after the family. A certain scion of this family, Iñigo Lopez de Mendoza, distinguished himself in the Battle of Las Navas de Tolosa (1218), where he probably served under the Navarrese banner. He was responsible for building the ancestral home of the family, the Tower of Mendoza, which still stands. This branch of the family entered the service of the Kingdom of Castile during the reign of Alfonso XI (1312–1350), and took active part in the Reconquista, where they quickly acquired extensive land holdings in Castile and southern Spain through military and political service. The members of the House of Mendoza intermarried extensively with the Castilian nobility, and the family has many descendants nowadays, with numerous nobility titles attached to it. The line of the Dukes of the Infantado formed one of the main branches of the family.

Another branch of the family was based in Laudio, 50km northwest from Vitoria-Gasteiz. The family got involved in the medieval bloody War of the Clans. Finally, in Erandio, a baserri exists under the same name. Its original name "mendotza" developed to "mendontze" in the 1890s, "mendoche" in the 1920s, "mendotxe" in the 1980s to the restored original of "mendotza" being the current. The surname spread quickly through Castile during the Middle Ages. With the discovery of America, many of its members would emigrate to the Americas, where the surname is common.

== Notable people with the surname ==
=== Business ===
- Eugenio Mendoza, Venezuelan businessman
- Lorenzo Mendoza, Venezuelan businessman
- Tom Mendoza, Vice Chairman of NetApp, Inc. and namesake of Notre Dame's business school

=== Arts, entertainment and media ===
- Amalia Mendoza, a Mexican singer
- Brillante Mendoza, a Filipino film director
- Dayana Mendoza, a Venezuelan actress, model who won Miss Universe 2008
- Doris Rosetta Elizabeth Mendoza, an Australian pianist and theatre director
- Eduardo Mendoza Garriga, a Spanish novelist
- Hazel Ann Mendoza, a Filipina actress
- Javier Mendoza (boxer), Mexican professional boxer
- June Mendoza, portrait painter
- Kerry-Anne Mendoza, editor of The Canary
- Linda Mendoza, an American film and television director
- Daus Mendoza, an American-Mexican influencer and YouTuber
- Lydia Mendoza, a Tex-Mex singer and interpreter of "corridos"
- Maine Mendoza, a Filipina actress
- Marco Mendoza, bass player
- Margot Rojas Mendoza (1903–1996), Cuban pianist and teacher
- Mark Mendoza, bass player
- Natalie Mendoza, a Hong Kong-born Australian actress and musician
- Pauline Mendoza, a Filipina actress
- Philip Mendoza, a British artist and cartoonist
- Rebecca Jackson Mendoza, an Australian actress, singer and dancer
- Mario Mendoza Zambrano, a Colombian Writer
- Vince Mendoza, an American jazz composer and arranger

=== Criminals ===
- Moises Sandoval Mendoza (1984–2025), Mexican-American convicted murderer

=== Fiction ===
- Aristotle "Ari" Mendoza, main character from the book Aristotle and Dante Discover the Secrets of the Universe, written by Benjamin Alire Sáenz
- Armando Mendoza Sáenz, coprotagonist of the Colombian Telenovela Yo soy Betty, la fea
- Jason Mendoza, a Filipino main character in the show The Good Place
- Maria Mendoza, an alternate Peruvian Wonder Woman created by Stan Lee
- Mendoza, a recurring gag character in The Simpsons
- Mendoza, fictional character of the "Company" books by Kage Baker
- Rodrigo Mendoza, fictional character of the movie The Mission
- Kai Mendoza, a character in the television show Almost Paradise
- Fat Dog Mendoza, main character from the animated television series of the same name

=== Military ===
- Íñigo López de Mendoza y Quiñones, Castilian general instrumental in the final stages of the Reconquista
- Diego Hurtado de Mendoza, Castilian nobleman
- César Mendoza, member of Government Junta of Chile (1973) as chief of Carabineros de Chile
- Pedro de Mendoza, conquistador
- Bernardino de Mendoza, Captain General
- Markos Alexander Mendoza, U.S. Army First Sergeant

=== Politics and government ===
- Diego Hurtado de Mendoza, 1st Duke of the Infantado, Spanish nobleman
- Antonio de Mendoza, first Viceroy of New Spain
- Bernardino de Mendoza, Spanish statesman and ambassador
- Carlos Antonio Mendoza, acting President of Panama
- César Mendoza, Chilean soldier
- Cristóbal Mendoza, First President of Venezuela
- Eduardo Mendoza Goiticoa, a Venezuelan cabinet minister and scientist
- Estelito Mendoza, Filipino politician and solicitor general
- Eugenio Mendoza, a Venezuelan cabinet minister and industrial
- García Hurtado de Mendoza, a Spanish governor of Chile
- Gloria Mendoza, American politician
- Heidi Mendoza, a Filipino public servant and former Undersecretary General for the United Nations Office of Internal Oversight
- Inés Mendoza, wife of Puerto Rico Governor Luis Muñoz Marín
- Íñigo López de Mendoza, 1st Marquess of Santillana, Castilian statesman and poet
- Juan González de Mendoza, Spanish minister and historian
- Leandro Mendoza, Philippine Secretary of Transportation and Communications
- Patricio Mendoza, Ecuadorian politician
- Pedro González de Mendoza, Spanish cardinal and statesman
- Sandra Mariela Mendoza, Argentine politician
- Susana Mendoza, Chicago, Illinois politician
- Victoria Muñoz Mendoza, Puerto Rico politician

=== Religion ===
- Pedro González de Mendoza, Spanish cardinal and statesman

=== Royalty ===
- Ana de Mendoza y de la Cerda, Spanish aristocrat
- Beatriz Fajardo de Mendoza y de Guzmán, Baroness of Polop and Benidorm

=== Science ===
- Josef de Mendoza y Ríos (1761–1816), Spanish astronomer and mathematician

=== Sport ===
- Alberto Mendoza (born 2006), American football quarterback and younger brother of fellow quarterback Fernando
- Alvin Mendoza, Mexican football (soccer) player
- Ana Mendoza (footballer), Mexican football (soccer) player
- Ana Mendoza (swimmer), Mexican breaststroke swimmer
- Carlos Mendoza (baseball coach), Venezuelan baseball coach
- Carlos Mendoza (outfielder), baseball player
- Daniel Mendoza, English boxer
- Elías Mendoza Habersperger, Peruvian lawyer, diplomat and politician, Chief Scout of Peru
- Fernando Mendoza (born 2003), American football quarterback
- Gabriel Mendoza, Chilean footballer
- Gleiker Mendoza, Venezuelan footballer
- Jessica Mendoza, American softball player
- Jesús Mendoza, Mexican football player
- Jonny Mendoza, Venezuelan boxer
- Luis Mendoza Benedetto, Venezuelan footballer
- Luis Mendoza, baseball player
- Luis Angel Mendoza, Mexican football player
- Mario Mendoza, baseball player
- Mauriño Mendoza (born 1964), Peruvian footballer
- Michael Mendoza, American football player
- Mike Mendoza, baseball player
- Ramiro Mendoza, baseball player
- Raul Mendoza, professional wrestler
- Rigoberto Mendoza (disambiguation), several people
- Rodrigo Mendoza, Spanish footballer
- Ruben Mendoza (American football), American football
- Sergio Michel Pérez Mendoza, Mexican racing driver

=== Other ===
- Indyra Mendoza (born 1968), Honduran LGBTQ+ activist
- Kayla Mendoza (born 1992), American serving 24 years in prison after being charged with vehicular homicide

== See also ==
- Mendonça, Portuguese variant
