= In the Garden of Iden =

1997 novel by Kage Baker

In The Garden of Iden
- First US edition
- Author: Kage Baker
- Cover artist: Michael Koelsch
- Language: English
- Series: The Company
- Genre: Science fiction
- Publisher: Harcourt (US); Hodder & Stoughton (UK)
- Publication date: 1997
- Publication place: United States
- Media type: Print (hardcover)
- Pages: 329
- ISBN: 0-15-100299-1
- OCLC: 37107094
- Dewey Decimal: 813/.54 21
- LC Class: PS3552.A4313 I5 1997
- Followed by: Sky Coyote

In the Garden of Iden is a 1997 science fiction novel by American writer Kage Baker. Although it is set entirely in the 16th century, in Spain and England, it is a science fiction story revolving around the activities of a group of immortal cyborgs, individuals who appear human but have been transformed by high technology.

Mendoza is a cyborg, who, like others of her kind, has been rescued from certain death as a small child and turned into an immortal machine, then made to work for "The Company." She loves her work and hates 'mortals'. All that changes when, on her first mission, she encounters love and learns the terrible price she has paid to live forever.

American illustrator Michael Koelsch painted the cover art of Baker's first three novels in The Company series, beginning with In the Garden of Iden.

== Plot introduction ==
This novel is the first in a series about "The Company" and its servants, human and otherwise. The series continues with Sky Coyote, Mendoza in Hollywood, The Graveyard Game, and The Life of the World to Come. The collection Black Projects, White Knights consists of Company stories, and there are allusions in the collection Mother Ægypt and Other Stories.

The story is told by Mendoza, a cyborg botanist. In the introduction, she describes a 24th-century organization called "Dr. Zeus Inc." or simply "The Company". The Company has the secrets of immortality and time travel. Unfortunately the immortality treatment can only be used on young children; and time travel is difficult, expensive, and only possible when going into the past and returning to your own time. History cannot be changed.

Dr. Zeus uses the technology simply to get rich. By travelling far into prehistory, the company creates its own immortal cyborg agents, who then have the mission of preserving cultural artifacts and other valuable items for sale in the 24th century. Usually these items are hidden in safe places, but in the case of extinct species, for instance, they are kept in secret Company caches run by the cyborgs. In the 24th century the Company then 'finds' the long-lost objects and sells them.

The cyborgs are expected to arrive in the 24th century the old-fashioned way, by living through the intervening millennia. On the way, they can create more cyborgs from those who would otherwise die as children.

=== Explanation of the novel's title ===
Mendoza and her companions journey to England, to the county Kent estate of Sir Walter Iden, who keeps a collection of exotic plants in a walled garden. Mendoza's job is to take genetic samples. Iden's estate also includes a recreation of the place where Alexander Iden, a Kentish nobleman, captured and killed Jack Cade, a rebel leader during the civil wars in the previous century. Alexander Iden and Jack Cade are both historical figures, as well as being characters in William Shakespeare's play, Henry VI, part 2. The fictional Sir Walter may have purchased both title and estate rather than inheriting them.

== Plot summary ==
Mendoza tells how she is snatched as a child from the Inquisition in Spain, having first been sold by her real parents to some 'noble Christians' who want her for pagan rites, but are instead arrested. In prison she is called Mendoza, after the name used by the pagans. She does not remember ever having a name of her own before that, her parents simply calling her "daughter" (hija in Spanish). She does not even know her family name, or the name of her village. One of the Inquisitors is Joseph, a cyborg, who is able to deliver her to his fellow agents for 'augmentation'.

Fifteen years later she returns to Spain for her first mission. Although she trained as a botanist and wants to go the New World, she has to spend time in Europe on an expedition to England. She finds that the expedition leader is Joseph, the cyborg who saved her. He is about 20,000 years old, having been recruited from the Basque region as a child when his village was massacred. Joseph is a Facilitator, a 'fixer', a top agent. He is also world-weary, cynical and irreverent. His passion is his work, like all the cyborgs, but he also has a deep-seated hatred of religious fanaticism, partly because his parents were killed by a cult, partly because of what he has seen in his long life. The group also includes Nefer, whose specialty is farm animals, and Flavius, a technician.

The mission is to travel to England as part of the entourage of Prince Philip of Spain, who is going to marry Queen Mary. Then they will go to the estate in Kent of Sir Walter Iden, who has been persuaded to let them sample rare plants from his garden. Mendoza is not pleased by all this. She is already deathly afraid of all 'mortals' as she calls them, and is further dismayed by the prospect of going to cold, wet, violent, disease-ridden England.

When they arrive, without Flavius who stays in London, two things quickly change her mind. One is a hedge of Ilex tormentosum, or Julius Caesar's Holly, a plant with tremendous medicinal properties. It is already rare and, in the future, it is extinct. The other is Nicholas Harpole, Sir Walter's secretary. Nicholas is "tall even for an Englishman" and has a horse-like face but is very intelligent and well-educated. She is immediately attracted to him, and Joseph, always on the lookout for an advantage, encourages her to seduce Nicholas. This she does, and settles in for a long stay, having decided that the Garden is full of unusual plants that will take years to catalogue.

Nicholas, it turns out, has a dark past, having been a member of an ecstatic Christian cult that practised sexual freedom. Deciding that the cult leader was simply exploiting his fellows, he broke away and began preaching radical ideas, for which he was arrested and put in chains. Although Nicholas is illegitimate, he had well-connected friends and was freed with the warning to sin no more.

Mendoza also has problems. As she matures, she finds she emits "Crome radiation", a psychic field which can have unpredictable effects on time and space. This is not supposed to be possible for cyborgs, who are screened for such abilities when recruited. (In a later Company story, we learn that Joseph caused the tests to be fudged because otherwise Mendoza would be tortured to death by the Inquisition.)

As the novel progresses, she is increasingly torn by love for Nicholas and the need to lie to him, to play her assigned part. Nicholas himself is suspicious of Mendoza and her companions. Old Sir Walter Iden, having been given rejuvenating treatments by Joseph as payment for their stay, decides to sell the estate and move to London. The entire household is already amazed by his transformation from doddering old man to virile middle-age. Joseph is furious but can do nothing. Then, while the household is being inventoried for the sale, Joseph is damaged in an accident which would have killed a normal human. Though he talks his way out of the immediate situation with his usual skill, he is eventually found out by Nicholas, who sees him doing self-repairs to his internal machinery.

Nicholas, having been prepared to elope with Mendoza, confronts her, believing her to be a devil in human form. She admits that, even in her own eyes, she is no longer human. Nicholas flees the estate.

Later she learns he has returned to preaching in Rochester, and has been condemned to burn by the new Catholic authorities. She runs away herself to Rochester, but is unable to convince him to recant. At this point Joseph appears, having followed Mendoza. His only purpose now is to prevent her becoming a Company renegade. He denounces Nicholas as just another fake messiah who can only lead others to destruction along with himself. He reveals to Nicholas that he has lived many thousands of years and has yet to see anything resembling the Truth that Nicholas and his like preach. Telling Nicholas that "of all the burnings I've witnessed, this is one I will actually enjoy" he takes Mendoza away.

The next morning, they witness Nicholas' death. Returning to the Iden estate, Joseph promises to pull strings and get Mendoza sent to the New World, as she originally wanted.

In the final chapter, Mendoza arrives at New World One in the South American jungle. It is a secret Company base run like a luxury hotel, where the servants are Mayans rescued from sacrifices. She settles into her new air-conditioned existence, with an unknowable future.

== Characters ==
- Mendoza, the narrator, is a "good machine". She obeys her masters except when her heart, mechanical though it may be, says otherwise. Mendoza does not actually know her real name, having been addressed only as "daughter" in her family. The Inquisition calls her Mendoza, the surname of the woman who pretended to be her mother.
- Joseph, the Facilitator who "recruited" Mendoza for the Company, is an ancient operative, a sly old fox who mistakenly believes the world has no surprises left for him.
- Nicholas Harpole is a tall, intelligent, devout Englishman with a dark past. He is reputedly the natural son of some unknown noble, raised by foster parents and supplied with a good education by his mysterious father. Although a man of his time he has unusual ideas which, if shared with the wrong people, are dangerous both to him and to them. In this he is at least 200 years ahead of his time. He speaks several languages, both Classical and contemporary. When not working for Sir Walter he spends his time in intense study, turning the pages of his books with machine-like regularity as he absorbs the text. He seems superhuman in some respects, more like the Company cyborgs than the people he works for. As the saga unfolds, Mendoza and Joseph discover how different he really is.

== Reception ==
Kirkus Reviews praised it as "highly impressive and thoroughly engrossing", and "sparkl(ing) with wit". Publishers Weekly found it to be "lively" and an "agreeable read" for fans of time travel stories, with "robust and detailed" characters and setting, but faulted its pacing and its "unusually far-fetched" premise.
