= Paul Youll =

British artist (born 1965)

- Born: June 8, 1965 (age 60); Hartlepool, England
- Education: Durham New College of Art and Design, Sunderland University
- Known for: Painting, illustration
- Movement: Fantasy, science fiction
- Family: Stephen Youll (brother)
- Website: paulyoull.com

Paul Youll (born 1965 in Hartlepool, England) is a science fiction and fantasy artist and illustrator. He was born as one of five sons and, at one time, was part of a two-man illustration team with his twin brother, Stephen. He got his start in the genre when his work, done in conjunction with Stephen's, was seen in 1987 at the 45th World Science Fiction Convention in Brighton, England. His first commission, a collaboration with Stephen, was for the cover painting for Emerald Eyes by Daniel Keys Moran that was published by Bantam Books.

After graduating from the Durham New College of Art and Design, Paul spent two more years at Sunderland University. Since 1989, when Stephen moved to America, Paul has worked independently and has produced paintings mainly for Bantam Books. Youll currently resides with his wife Annmarie in the country village of Esh Winning, on the border of Derwent Side and County Durham. He illustrates primarily for the U.S. softcover (paperback) book market.

== Works ==
This list is incomplete

- Star Wars: X-wing
  - Rogue Squadron (1995)
  - Wedge's Gamble (1995)
  - The Krytos Trap (1996)
  - The Bacta War (1996)
  - Wraith Squadron (1997)
  - Iron Fist (1997)
  - Solo Command (1997)
  - Isard's Revenge (1998)
  - Starfighters of Adumar (1999)
- Tales From the New Republic (1998)
- The Icarus Hunt (1999) by Timothy Zahn
- Dr. Zeus Inc. series by Kage Baker
  - The Life of the World to Come (2004)
  - The Children of the Company (2005)
  - Gods and Pawns (2007)
- The Merchant Princes series by Charles Stross
  - The Family Trade (2004)
  - The Hidden Family (2005)
  - The Clan Corporate (2006)
  - The Merchants' War (2007)
  - The Revolution Business (2009)
  - The Trade of Queens (2010)
- The Age of Fire series by E. E. Knight
  - Dragon Champion (2005)
  - Dragon Avenger (2006)
  - Dragon Outcast (2007)
  - Dragon Strike (2008)
- Excession by Ian M. Banks (1998)
- The Mirrored Heavens by David J. Williams (2008)

=== Joint works ===
These works were done in collaboration with his brother, Stephen.

This list is incomplete

- Emerald Eyes (1988) by Daniel Keys Moran
- On My Way to Paradise (1989) by Dave Wolverton
- Infinity Hold by Barry B. Longyear
- Shaping the Dawn by Sheila Finch
- To the Land of the Living by Robert Silverberg
- The Atheling by Grace Chetwin
- A Fire in the Sun by George Alec Effinger
- The Exile Kiss by George Alec Effinger
- Lord of Snow and Shadows by Sarah Ash
- The Garden of the Shaped by Sheila Finch
- A Feast for Crows by George R.R. Martin
- Mistress of Dragons by Margaret Weis
- Beauty by Sheri S. Tepper
- The Gates of Winter by Mark Anthony
- Fool's Errand by Robin Hobb
- Golden Fool by Robin Hobb
- Hung Out by Margaret Weis and Don Perrin
- A Forest of Stars by Kevin J. Anderson
- Hidden Empire by Kevin J. Anderson
- Defender by C. J. Cherryh
- Gojiro by John Barnes
- The Wellstone by Wil Mccarthy
- The Collasium by Wil Mccarthy
- The Green Brain by Frank Herbert
- The Eyes of Heisenberg by Frank Herbert
