= The Merchant Princes =

Series of novels by Charles Stross

Cover art to The Family Trade, the first novel of the series.

The Merchant Princes is a science fantasy and alternate history series of nine novels by British writer Charles Stross. In the series, there exist a number of parallel worlds, all of which are on the same geographical Earth but with different societies at different points of development. Members of a certain bloodline can travel between these worlds along with their immediate possessions. The series largely follows Miriam Beckstein, a technology journalist raised in a familiar "normal" Earth, who discovers she was born in a parallel world and is a member of this bloodline. She quickly becomes entangled in political maneuvering and assassination plots with her estranged family. Miriam uses modern technology and investigative journalism to attempt to stay a step ahead.

The implications of this world-traveling ability are thoroughly explored by the series. The ability to take clothing and held items across allows a phenomenally lucrative import/export trade between worlds; wielders of this power have used it to become wealthy. Invaluable modern technology and medicine can be shipped to the feudal world; illegal drugs can be shipped in a world where the DEA has no power; and packages or messages that would take months to deliver by horseback can simply be mailed via FedEx in the modern world. This power has implications for security and crime as well, since it is now possible to commit a crime then disappear into thin air, and difficult to lock someone up in any effective manner. It also means there is immense social pressure on members of the genetic bloodline to breed with other compatible members to increase the likelihood of the ability manifesting.

The first six novels in the series were released from 2004 to 2010, and take place in 2002–2004 of an alternate present. The books were later re-released in 2014 as A Merchant Princes Omnibus, a trilogy of three books with each book a combination of two of the original novels: The Bloodline Feud (books 1 and 2), The Traders' War (books 3 and 4), and The Revolution Trade (books 5 and 6). The re-release also included a considerable amount of editing and rewriting by Stross, although no major plot changes. A new trilogy began in 2017 with the release of Empire Games featuring new characters and updating the year in-setting to 2020.

The first three novels of the series collectively won the Sidewise Award for Alternate History in 2006. The series was also nominated for the 2022 Hugo Award for Best Series.

== Development and themes ==
According to Stross, in 2001, he had already sold two books to the publisher Ace Books, Singularity Sky and Iron Sunrise. Ace also had the right of first refusal to any future science fiction books Stross would publish, and would likely only publish one book of his a year so as not to have his books compete against themselves. His agent advised him that if he wished to sell more books without breach of contract and also to avoid self-cannibalization, he should branch out genres, and encouraged Stross to try his hand at a fantasy series. Stross was hesitant, but gave it a shot. He wanted to be original but not "too original" and create something hard to market. He decided his series would be his own spin on both the works of Roger Zelazny's The Chronicles of Amber, which featured a hero with special world-travelling powers, and the Paratime series of H. Beam Piper, which features an organization with the power to basically raid and exploit multiple alternate histories. The main world to be visited would also be a feudal one more out of the Renaissance, per many other fantasy stories. Stross chose to limit the scope of "magical" powers to solely the world-travelling. Stross was able to sell his new fantasy series to Tor Books, and would later adjust his contract with Ace to specifically exclude The Merchant Princes. This allowed Stross to explain the magic in the series with background science fiction without worrying about breach of contract, while also satisfying his desire for a consistent explanation of what was "really" going on behind the scenes.

One of the themes that Stross wanted to explicitly explore in the series was that of the development trap, or more generally developmental economics, the issues involved in helping poor and stratified societies to rapidly "catch up." Economist Paul Krugman wrote about the series that Stross noticed that "the fantasy thought experiment, in which someone brings modern science and technology to a backward society, isn't a fantasy. It is, instead, something that's been tried all across the very real Third World," to mixed success at best. While some countries such as South Korea became rich powerhouses, others such as Thailand have only modernized somewhat, and some states like Somalia remain desperately poor, just with access to cell phones and guns. The case of the Gulf oil states such as Saudi Arabia remains a special case, with a fabulously privileged upper class able to be educated abroad and get cutting-edge medical care and the like, but not expanding the economy of their societies beyond the treasure trove that is their wealth from natural resources – which is compared with the Clan's treasure trove from interdimensional trade. Krugman qualified his praise of the economics with a proviso that the books "are, first and foremost, great fun" with a "rollicking plot," and not a bland essay about the implications of such trade.

== The Family Trade ==
The Family Trade
- Author: Charles Stross
- Cover artist: Paul Youll
- Language: English
- Series: The Merchant Princes
- Genre: Science fantasy Alternate history
- Publisher: Tor Books
- Publication date: December 2004
- Publication place: United States
- Media type: Print (Hardcover and Paperback)
- Pages: 303
- ISBN: 0-7653-0929-7
- OCLC: 55044730
- Dewey Decimal: 813/.6 22
- LC Class: PR6119.T79 F36 2004
- Followed by: The Hidden Family

The Family Trade is the first book of The Merchant Princes, published in 2004. It introduces the reader to technology journalist Miriam Beckstein, who finds herself in a parallel world in which her extended family holds power.

Miriam's adoptive mother Iris gives her a shoebox filled with items that belonged to Miriam's birth mother, a Jane Doe who died mysteriously when Miriam was only a baby. Among other items, Miriam finds a locket. Inside is a design not unlike a Celtic knot, and when she focuses on it, she is transported to a parallel world of a feudal Massachusetts whose technology is mostly in the Dark Ages—except for the men on horses armed with guns, and an upper class that has access to "imported" baubles from Miriam's normal Earth.

Miriam quickly finds herself caught up in the feuds of her estranged family, which calls itself the Clan. The Clan has used the genetic ability to travel back and forth between the two worlds to build a lucrative import/export trade, and enrich themselves. However, their founder and progeny were from the feudal world, and thus their mores and beliefs are as well; they are content to merely enrich themselves, and seek to ingratiate themselves to the local nobility, rather than to help the commonfolk. The easy money from their power also complicates reform. Miriam compares them to Saudi princes who visit the United States and Europe, but think in an entirely different way. The Clan's most profitable transport is currently drugs, which bothers Miriam both for ethical reasons, and in her belief that the Clan could do far better. She decides to attempt to reform the business from within, while dodging the various assassination plots hatched against her. She also understands that the drug trade will only last so long; anonymity and carrying large amounts of raw cash are growing steadily more suspicious.

Miriam finds a number of potential allies in her travels. They include Paulie, a research assistant from her former job with some experience in the field of law; Roland, a distant relation, economist, and potential love interest who would also like to be free of the Clan's machinations and prefers the United States to the feudal Gruinmarkt; Duke Angbard Lofstrom, Miriam's uncle and head of security for the Clan, as well as leader of its Boston operations; Olga, a young and flighty noble who helps explain to Miriam the politics and notables of Gruinmarkt; and Briliana and Kara, two lesser noble ladies-in-waiting assigned to Miriam's service in Gruinmarkt's capital of Niejwein.

Reviews of the book often note its rather abrupt ending. This is because both it and The Hidden Family were originally written as one novel, but that novel was then split for brevity's sake, as 600 pages was too long. The Family Trade placed fifth in the annual Locus Poll for best fantasy novel. The Family Trade and The Hidden Family were later released together as The Bloodline Feud, with some editing and adjustments.

== The Hidden Family ==
The Hidden Family
- Author: Charles Stross
- Cover artist: Paul Youll
- Language: English
- Series: The Merchant Princes
- Genre: Science fantasy Alternate history
- Publisher: Tor Books
- Publication date: June 2005
- Publication place: United States
- Media type: Print (Hardcover and Paperback)
- Pages: 303
- ISBN: 0-7653-1347-2
- OCLC: 57286043
- Dewey Decimal: 813/.6 22
- LC Class: PR6119.T79 H53 2005
- Preceded by: The Family Trade
- Followed by: The Clan Corporate

The Hidden Family is the second book of The Merchant Princes, published in 2005. It completes the story begun in The Family Trade of Miriam Beckstein's attempts to understand and explore the new worlds she has access to. As the title suggests, the existence of families with the power to "worldwalk" unknown to the Clan becomes important in this book, as a shadow war to undermine the Clan continues. The story also includes Miriam's exploration of a third world largely unknown to the Clan, where Massachusetts is part of "New Britain" and the British monarchy fled to America; this nation has roughly Edwardian mores and 1930s technology. The existence of this third world also complicates security expectations, as it provides an angle to attack the Clan from locations which might seem safely guarded in both worlds, but are unguarded in the third world.

In The Hidden Family, Miriam correctly hypothesizes that the Clan civil war that took place around the time she was born was caused and intensified by a third party – a distant branch of the Clan that, while weaker, was unknown and had access to a different world. They were thus able to perform attacks that seemed as if they must come from a rival world-walker within the Clan, but actually came from the Hidden Family. Miriam also believes this third party to be behind the attack on her birth mother. For reasons she cannot entirely understand, this branch family considers her existence a threat as well. Miriam also has to contend with elements in the Clan who distrust her. She is warned that in six months, a large Clan meeting will occur at Beltaigne, and her rivals – including her own blood grandmother Hildegarde – are likely to motion to have her declared incompetent, which would deny her the funds held in trust that was her inheritance. Lastly, Miriam believes that Duke Lofstram's security forces have a mole working for the Hidden Family, after several security lapses and attempts on her life that seemed to know too much.

Most of the book concerns Miriam's efforts in New Britain, both to research the hidden family as well as to build her own personal base of power separate from the alternative of marrying a Clan noble and throwing herself under his faction's protection. Miriam gained access to it via taking a New Britain locket off one of the hidden assassins who attacked her at the end of The Family Trade. There, she ships gold – tightly regulated under the mercantilist belief that the government requires a large supply of bullion – and allies with the Levellers, dissidents from the Royal government who demand something like the rights secured in the American Revolution in Miriam's world. Erasmus Burgeson, a Leveller quartermaster and pawnshop owner, helps set Miriam up with false identity papers, and Miriam moves on to her next money-making plan. After shipping gold to get some initial funds, she will instead ship ideas. She buys a business and begins to take to New Britain old patents from the 1900s–1950s unfamiliar there, and sell rights to the ideas.

Publishers Weekly in their review said "Stross continues to mix high and low tech in amusing and surprising ways. However, while giving a gritty SF portrait of the marvels of modern market economics and correcting the too pretty portrait of too many medieval fantasy lands, he sometimes overlooks the realities that constrain both. Still, less historically minded readers can lose themselves in Miriam's attempts to survive the Clan's equally dangerous high-stakes business and social games. Stross weaves a tale worthy of Robert Ludlum or Dan Brown." Roland Green reviewing the book for Booklist compared it to the early novels in Roger Zelazny's Amber series. The Hidden Family was a finalist for the 2006 Prometheus Award.

== The Clan Corporate ==
The Clan Corporate
- Author: Charles Stross
- Cover artist: Paul Youll
- Language: English
- Series: The Merchant Princes
- Genre: Alternate history, Science fantasy
- Publisher: Tor Books
- Publication date: May 16, 2006
- Publication place: United States
- Media type: Print (Hardcover and Paperback)
- Pages: 320
- ISBN: 0-7653-0930-0
- OCLC: 62393136
- Dewey Decimal: 813/.6 22
- LC Class: PR6119.T79 C63 2006
- Preceded by: The Hidden Family
- Followed by: The Merchants' War

The Clan Corporate is the third book of The Merchant Princes, published in 2006. It is the first part of the series' second story. In The Clan Corporate, Miriam Beckstein runs into trouble. Her experimental corporation in New Britain has been somewhat abandoned with other Clan minders overseeing it, officially due to concerns she might be assassinated, but actually due to political rivalries. The truce between the Clan and the Lee Family of New Britain seems to hold, at least. The Clan still does not trust the upstart; Miriam is largely kept isolated in the first parallel world of Gruinmarkt, a virtual prisoner, and unable to travel unchaperoned. Miriam escapes surveillance for a time and finds out about the "insurance policy", a plot by the more modernizing faction of the Clan to create hundreds more world-walkers by offering mass artificial insemination at compromised sperm banks, then attempt to recruit the resulting children. She stirs up enough trouble in her investigations that she is quickly re-imprisoned, her activities even more strongly circumscribed than before.

On normal Earth, a parallel subplot involves Mike Fleming, a DEA cop who dated Miriam in the past. Mike is pulled into a secret government task force that is investigating the Clan's activities; from the US Government's perspective, the Clan is "transdimensional narcoterrorists". This "Family Trade Organization" has a key asset in the Clan defector from the first two books who had arrived seeking a witness protection program. The defector's aid helps the government arrest other Clan couriers, seize Clan assets, and begin to compile an English-Hochsprache dictionary. This language study will allow agents to communicate if they can reach Gruinmarkt via captured couriers outfitted with Battle Royale-esque time bombs on their heads. The government is also alarmed to learn that the Clan possesses nuclear weapons, while Mike is concerned by the quasi-legality and loose morality of the operation. The plan goes awry as their defector source begins to grow restless and realizes that he is being held by the military now, not by law enforcement, and witness protection is not forthcoming. In a desperate bid to take a hostage and escape, both the defector and Mike's co-worker Pete are killed.

A trapped Miriam learns her fate: she is to be spared for her indiscretions, but only to be tied down in a political marriage, the only thing that can satisfy the more conservative instincts of the Clan. The Clan seeks to tie itself to the royal family so that it can rule Gruinmarkt. The King's two sons each have problems; the eldest son Egon has a cruel streak and is known as the "Pervert," while the youngest son, Creon, has PKU and is considered an "Idiot" after being poisoned with sweetener at a young age. Egon does not bear the recessive world-walker genes from the Clan member that had managed to sneak into the royal line, while Creon does, thus making the Clan favor Creon. Miriam's great-uncle Henryk, the king's head of spies, explains that if she marries Creon, his affliction would not affect his children, so she could produce potential world-walker Clan members to eventually reign. Miriam is treated by a Clan fertility doctor and reluctantly goes forward with the plan after she is threatened with her ailing mother losing access to medical care, despite her strong aversion to marrying for "duty."

In the final act, Clan allies gather for the banquet to celebrate the forced engagement of Miriam and Creon. Agent Fleming is sent by the government to the banquet as well as part of a plan to make contact with her and turn her into an informant, posing as a captured West Coast courier. All the plans fall to pieces when the anti-Clan Prince Egon launches a coup, correctly fearing he would be denied the succession and possibly murdered had Creon produced an heir. The King and Creon are slain; Miriam escapes to New Britain; and Mike is captured by Miriam's mother Patricia and her ally Olga.

Reviews noted that The Clan Corporate suffers from a similar issue to the first book; it is clearly the first part of a two-part story, and ends on a cliffhanger with its plot threads still hanging.

== The Merchants' War ==
The Merchants' War
- Author: Charles Stross
- Cover artist: Paul Youll
- Language: English
- Series: The Merchant Princes
- Genre: Alternate history, Science fantasy
- Publisher: Tor Books
- Publication date: October 16, 2007
- Publication place: United States
- Media type: Print (Hardcover and Paperback)
- Pages: 336
- ISBN: 978-0-7653-1671-4
- OCLC: 124036350
- Dewey Decimal: 823/.92 22
- LC Class: PR6119.T79 M47 2007
- Preceded by: The Clan Corporate
- Followed by: The Revolution Business

The Merchant's War is the fourth book of The Merchant Princes, published in 2007. Protagonist Miriam Beckstein is on the run in the world of New Britain (Timeline 3) after narrowly escaping an attack in Gruinmarkt (Timeline 1). The Clan itself struggles with a war on two fronts: one against Prince Egon's coup for control of Gruinmarkt, and another against the secretive US government task force investigating the Clan (Timeline 2).

In New London, the equivalent of New York City in Timeline 2 and Niejwein in Gruinmarkt, Miriam seeks out one of Erasmus Burgeson's Leveler contacts, Lady Bishop, for aid and shelter. The situation in New Britain is not good: the King has dismissed Parliament, another colonial war rages overseas, and the Treasury is paying its bills by printing money, leading to stagflation. The Levelers wish to create a democratic system, but are wary of moving until the burst of war-fueled government support wears off. Miriam still fears elements of the Clan are out to murder her. She reconnects with Erasmus, dodges both Clan agents and the police, recovers the laptop she stowed in Boston, and heads west with Erasmus to meet a noted Leveler intellectual and leader. However, Miriam feels strangely sick, especially while briefly world-walking to Gruinmarkt to evade the police.

Duke Angbard Lofstrom of the Clan charges his agent Briliana d'Ost with recovering Miriam, or, failing that, to ensure she no longer poses a threat to the Clan. The situation is complicated by the fact that Miriam's mother seemingly arranged for her to be artificially inseminated by Prince Creon during her examinations, meaning she is pregnant with the heir to the throne. Pregnant world-walkers cannot safely travel if their child would be a world-walker themselves, though, and Miriam comes from a world where, if she were to find out about her condition, abortion is legal. Angbard also summons Huw, an MIT grad student, and assigns him with investigating both the lockets and exploration of potential new worlds. Experimentation had largely been forbidden for fear of losing valuable couriers before, but with their base in the United States under threat, the Clan needs to seek out alternatives. Huw and his team discover that the Lee family Locket, while ineffective in Massachusetts and New York in the United States, works in Maryland, and leads to a fourth world in the grip of an Ice Age with polar sheets covering the northern States. The fourth world (Timeline 4) is seemingly empty, but shows signs of a highly advanced, dead civilization.

In Timeline 2, Mike Fleming recovers from his injuries sustained in the escape from Miriam's wedding banquet. Luckily for him, the infection in his leg is not resistant to penicillin, as overuse of antibiotics has not affected Gruinmarkt's bacteria. While Fleming recovers, the viewpoint character shifts to Colonel Eric Smith, his superior. Smith is considerably more ruthless than Fleming in his viewpoint and morality. He is introduced to government scientists that have figured out how to send tiny cell samples on their own without need for captured Clan couriers; managing attempts to use Mike's contact Olga to negotiate over the Clan's nuclear weapons; and attempting to hunt down (with the help of NIRT) a potential nuclear weapon that is already a ticking time bomb in Boston planted by the defector. In the long term, the government seeks to deal with peak oil via potentially invading alternate-universe Texas.

Prince Egon confounds the Clan with intelligence tactics designed to minimize the Clan's advantages in technology and firepower. He immediately takes to the field, moves with a small detachment, does not dress in royal frippery but as a normal officer and keeps body doubles around, and has an elite guard armed with modern Earth weapons such as MP5s. All this renders assassinating him chancy. In battlefield strategy, he splits his forces into small groups which raid Clan manors, execute anyone vaguely related to the Clan, then melt back into the forest. This causes panicked requests for aid from the Clan's lesser allies, spreading the Clan forces thinly; it is compared to the strategic hamlets in the Vietnam War, where similar insurgency tactics were used. After spreading the Clan out, Egon seeks to concentrate the core Clan members so they can be annihilated; this requires a risky concentration of his own forces, but through misdirection and treachery, he and his ally Baron Otto Neuhalle take the key Hjalmar Palace the Clan held. It is not known if he has a world-walker ally keeping him informed, or if he is adeptly using information gained from his grandmother on the Clan's powers and limitations.

Eventually, the Family Trade Organization, under Colonel Smith, finds the planted nuke. They also track down a large group of Clan members assembling in the US to retake the Hjalmar Palace. The Clan is forced to act in haste; they do retake the Palace, but at the cost of being unable to return to the United States easily in that location. Miriam and Erasmus arrive in California, but find a deadly reception from the British Sheriff who has orders for their arrest. Briliana, Huw, and Huw's team sweeps in to save Miriam and ambush the police with advanced American weaponry. Miriam is offered a path back to the Clan and to aid the "progressive" faction against the conservatives.

Publishers Weekly and other reviewers praised the book, although thought the addition of the government subplot meant that the characterization was spread a little too thinly with not enough room to develop all the characters' plots.

== The Revolution Business ==
The Revolution Business
- Author: Charles Stross
- Language: English
- Series: The Merchant Princes
- Genre: Science fiction Alternate history
- Publisher: Tor Books
- Publication date: April 15, 2009
- Publication place: United States
- Media type: Print (Hardcover and Paperback)
- ISBN: 0-7653-1672-2
- OCLC: 243544986
- Dewey Decimal: 823/.92 22
- LC Class: PR6119.T79 R48 2009
- Preceded by: The Merchants' War
- Followed by: The Trade of Queens

The Revolution Business is the fifth book of The Merchant Princes, published in 2009. The Clan, the world-walking crime syndicate, is still in turmoil after the incapacitation of one of its key leaders and an ongoing crackdown by the US government. Miriam Beckstein returns to the fold, but only to find the Clan itself splintering into factions.

== The Trade of Queens ==
The Trade of Queens
- Author: Charles Stross
- Language: English
- Series: The Merchant Princes
- Genre: Science fantasy Alternate history
- Publisher: Tor Books
- Publication date: March 16, 2010
- Publication place: United States
- Media type: Print (Hardcover and Paperback)
- ISBN: 978-0-7653-5591-1
- Preceded by: The Revolution Business
- Followed by: Empire Games

The Trade of Queens is the sixth book in The Merchant Princes, published in 2010. The Clan has split between conservative and progressive factions and the bitter internal struggle reaches its peak. Meanwhile, the United States plots its revenge on the Gruinmarkt. The sixth book culminates in a dramatic ending that changes worlds forever.

In Timeline 2 (USA) DEA Agent Mike Fleming finds himself targeted by his superiors at the Family Trade Organization (FTO) and running out of time to stop the Clan's planned terrorist attack. When Miriam's former press colleague Steve Schroeder mistakes Fleming for a kook, the warning goes unheeded to drastic results. In 2003, the Clan detonates an atom bomb in Washington, DC, killing the President and thousands of civilians. Realizing his mistake, Schroeder tells the FBI about Fleming's visit and his story concerning the Clan and stolen US nuclear weapons.

== Empire Games ==
Empire Games
- Author: Charles Stross
- Language: English
- Series: The Merchant Princes
- Genre: Alternate history, science fiction
- Publisher: Tor Books
- Publication date: 2017
- Publication place: United States
- Media type: Print (Hardcover and Paperback)
- ISBN: 978-1-4472-4628-2
- Preceded by: The Trade of Queens
- Followed by: Dark State

Empire Games is the seventh book in the series, published in January 2017. It is the start of a new trilogy in the series. Empire Games begins 17 years after the end of The Trade of Queens.

In a flashback, it is revealed that having fled the US-nuked Gruinmarket (Timeline 1) Clan progressives spent time in a prison camp in the Commonwealth (Timeline 3). There, they devised a plan to work with Sir Adam to industrialize New Britain and make tremendous technological strides under the Clan's technological transfer program. When Miriam Beckstein, Brilliana d'Ost, Olga Thorold, and Huw and Hulius Hjorth are seen again in 2020, they are high-ranking citizens, prepping to launch New Britain's first astronaut into orbit.

Meanwhile, the United States (Timeline 2) has become an increasingly authoritarian and paranoid police state. A new protagonist, Rita Douglas, is introduced. Rita is the biological daughter of Miriam and her first husband, given up for adoption while Miriam was still in college. Though Rita has no knowledge of her bio-relatives, she has been on the government's radar since the Clan's 2003 nuclear strike. Now in her mid-twenties, Rita gets scooped up by the Dept. of Homeland Security and is thrust into service. Why now? The US has stumbled upon a "new" timeline—one in which three of their drones have been shot down—and thinks they may have finally found the long-lost world-walkers.

After undergoing basic orientation, Rita visits her Grandpa Kurt, who, it is implied, has a shady past during the Cold War. Suspicious of her work with the government, Kurt tells Rita about the time the Stasi tried to recruit him as an informer and gives her a dog-eared copy of The Grasshopper Lies Heavy, with the cryptic message, "You should read this."

Commonwealth spy Major Hulius Hjorth makes a trip of his own to rendezvous with Paulette in Timeline 2. After 15 years, Paulie is tired of the spy life, but refuses to leave the US. When Yul is nearly caught, New Britain's Department of Para-historical Research (DPR) decides Paulette must be retired, as she knows too much, and Brilliana proposes voluntary or semi-voluntary extraction vs. liquidation. Brill also notes that the Commonwealth is aware of Rita's absence in Timeline 2.

Rita undergoes surgery to have her abilities "switched on." Unlike her world-walking relatives, she does not suffer from the same complications—elevated blood pressure, blinding headaches, nausea, and a required waiting period for jaunts. She is taken to Camp Singularity, where Rita experiences "the Gate", which crosses two timelines at once, in one of which a planetary black hole is all that is left of Earth.

After a few successful reconnaissance jaunts to a train yard in Timeline 3's version of Allentown, Pennsylvania, to gather intelligence for the US, Rita has some down time and meets up with an old flame, Angie, who also has a connection to Rita's grandfather.

Unbeknownst to Rita, Miriam, now a Commissioner in the Commonwealth, is the subject of an assassination attempt, and the suspect's train ticket leads the government to hunt for a sleeper cell in the same area as the train yard. New Britain's King-in-Exile, John Frederick Charles of Hanover, has teamed up with the Dauphin Louis of the French continental empire to foment dissent in the new government during Sir Adam's declining health. Already mistrustful of the monarchist, the Commonwealth goes on alert, and Rita is captured on one of her missions.

Should she lie, or go along with questioning? She was seen mid-jaunt, and they swabbed for DNA, so Rita confesses. Before others in the Party can use Rita to their advantage, Olga steps in and whisks her away to a secret meeting where the history of the Clan and the US government is explained. She is now tasked with acting as a reluctant go-between for the two governments.

Back in the US, Kurt receives a mysterious letter advising him of Rita's recent activities. Old emotions are stirred, as his secret past is revealed and he contemplates its effect on the future.

There is an Afterword in the book, discussing the origins of the FTO, the DHS, multi-verses, and an interesting revelation about the Clan's founding member.

== Dark State ==
Dark State
- Author: Charles Stross
- Language: English
- Series: The Merchant Princes
- Genre: Alternate history, science fiction
- Publisher: Tor Books
- Publication date: 2018
- Publication place: United States
- Media type: Print (Hardcover and Paperback)
- ISBN: 978-1-4472-4758-6
- Preceded by: Empire Games
- Followed by: Invisible Sun

Dark State is the eighth book in the series, published in January 2018. The New American Commonwealth (formerly "New Britain") faces its first regime change since the revolution. The Commonwealth must juggle tense relations with the United States and with former Royalists across the Atlantic plotting a comeback. Meanwhile, Para-time archaeologists from the US inadvertently stir up an ancient threat in the multiverse greater than anything previously imagined.

== Invisible Sun ==
Invisible Sun
- Author: Charles Stross
- Language: English
- Series: The Merchant Princes
- Genre: Alternate history, science fiction
- Publisher: Tor Books
- Publication date: 2021
- Publication place: United States
- Media type: Print (Hardcover and Paperback)
- ISBN: 978-1-4472-4759-3 (978-1-4472-4762-3 for the smaller paperback)
- Preceded by: Dark State

Invisible Sun is the ninth and final book in the series. It concludes the story arcs that began in Empire Games and continued in Dark State.
