= The Icarus Hunt =

Book by Timothy Zahn

- Author: Timothy Zahn
- Cover artist: Paul Youll
- Language: English
- Series: Yes
- Genre: Science fiction
- Publisher: Bantam Spectra
- Publication date: August 3, 1999
- Publication place: United States
- Media type: Print (hardback & paperback) & Audiobook
- Pages: 368 (Hardcover)
- ISBN: 0-553-10702-X
- OCLC: 40681703
- Dewey Decimal: 813/.54 21
- LC Class: PS3576.A33 I28 1999

The Icarus Hunt is a science fiction novel by American writer Timothy Zahn. It was first published in hardcover in August 1999, and was released in paperback in July 2000. It is a homage to the thriller novels of Alistair MacLean.

== Plot summary ==
Jordan McKell, a smuggler for a crime lord nicknamed Brother John and his boss, Mr. Antoniewicz, is offered a job by a man named Alexander Borodin, whom he recognizes as the famous industrialist Arno Cameron. Cameron wants McKell to pilot the ship Icarus, which is carrying very important cargo, to Earth. McKell accepts the job.

A series of bizarre events leads McKell to believe that they have a saboteur aboard. Convinced the Icarus is carrying something far more important than he had originally supposed, and that they are being hunted, he lands the Icarus under a false name. An old acquaintance tells him that there is now a reward out for knowledge of his whereabouts.

McKell realizes that the Icarus is being hunted by the Patth, an alien race who have a near-monopoly on the galaxy's shipping industry. There are more sabotage incidents aboard the ship, leading McKell to believe that one of the crew is a Patth agent. It is revealed the ship's computer tech, Tera, is the daughter of Arno Cameron and that Cameron himself had stowed away aboard the Icarus.

While exploring deep inside the Icarus' interior, McKell discovers that the Icarus is an interstellar teleportation device called a stargate. Arno Cameron had not jumped ship as previously supposed, but was instead stuck at the stargate's other end.

On the isolated planet Beyscrim, they are confronted by Antoniewicz, and it is revealed that Antoniewicz had engineered most of the sabotage incidents, believing McKell was no longer loyal to him. Recognizing the Icarus' value, he had decided to take it for himself, and maneuvered the Icarus and its crew into coming to Beyscrim.

McKell reveals that he is not a smuggler, but instead a member of a military intelligence organization assigned to infiltrate Antoniewicz's operation. Landing the Icarus on Beyscrim had been bait to bring Antoniewicz out of his cover. The book concludes with the crew celebrating their rescue, while Cameron makes plans for smuggling the Icarus back to Earth for research.

== Reception ==
Roland Green of Booklist called the book "one of the better novels in some time for readers moving from Star Wars and its clones to other sf". Jackie Cassada of Library Journal called it a "good choice for most sf collections". Don D'Ammassa of the Science Fiction Chronicle called it an "old fashioned space opera in the very best sense of the term".

John Foyston of The Oregonian said that the "characters are lifelike if not fully dimensional". John R. Alden of The Plain Dealer wrote that the book is "about as original as a bologna sandwich". Brad Skillman of the Associated Press wrote that the book is "not very deep", contains "quite a few plot aggravations" and called the ending a "tad manipulative".
