= Tower of Mendoza =

- Mendoza dorretxea (Basque)
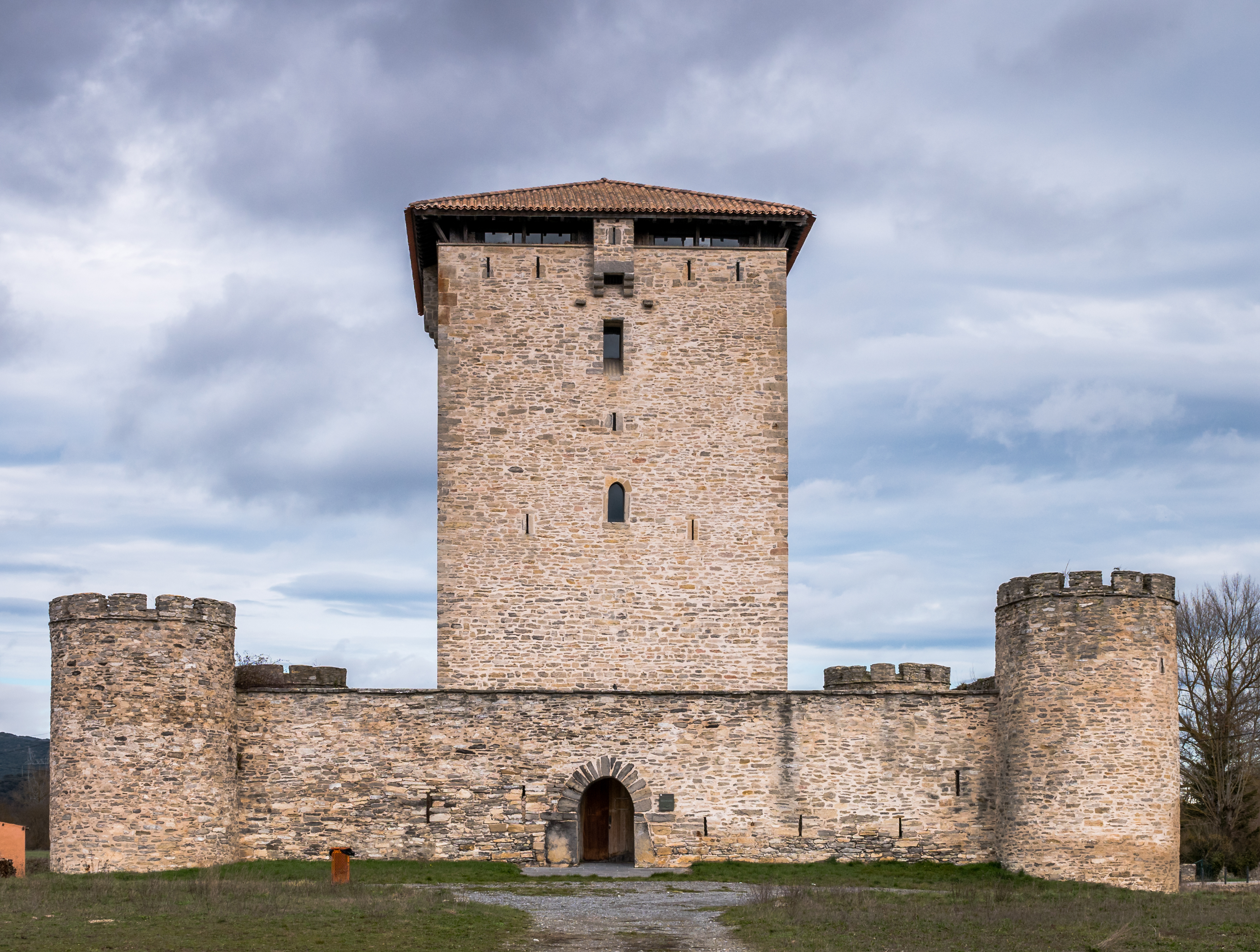

- Location within Spain
- 42.859722°N 2.773611°W
- Location: Vitoria-Gasteiz, Spain

Spanish Cultural Heritage
- Official name: Torre de Mendoza
- Type: Non-movable
- Criteria: Monument
- Designated: 1984
- Reference no.: RI-51-0005119

The Tower of Mendoza (Spanish: Torre de Mendoza, Basque: Mendoza dorretxea) is a tower located in Vitoria-Gasteiz, Spain. It was declared Bien de Interés Cultural in 1984. The tower is strategically located between the roads of Old Castile and the Ebro river.

The Tower of Mendoza is a fortified tower located in the village of Mendoza, near Vitoria-Gasteiz (Álava, País Vasco, Spain). It was built in the thirteenth century as a residence of the House of Mendoza.

== History ==
The Mendoza's entered to the service of the kingdom of Castile during the reign of Alfonso XI (1312-1350). Álava is one of the Basque territories incorporated into the Castilian monarchy with jurisdictions. Before the Mendoza's went to Castile, Álava was a battlefield, in which the lordly families resolved their fights over generations. In 1332, the Mendoza's had already battled several times with the Guevara. Once this castle entered into the service of the kings of Castilla, those contests were ended.

Iñigo Lopez de Mendoza built the Tower of Mendoza in the early 13th century. He participated in the Battle of Las Navas de Tolosa in 1212 and for having contributed to the breaking of the siege of the chains that guarded the store of Almohade, Muhammad al-Nasir (Miramamolin) (1199-1213), added to his coat of arms a border with chains.

The Dukes of the Infantado maintained possession of the Tower of Mendoza until its 1856 sale to the Victorian Bruno Martinez of Aragon and Fernandez de Gamboa.

For 50 years, it was assigned to the Diputación Foral de Álava and hosted the Museum of Heraldry of Álava, with a collection of medieval shields and clothing and information on Alava's heraldry. On December 15, 2012, it was returned to its owners because it does not meet the accessibility requirements for a museum.

== Description ==
The tower stands out of the whole castle. The wall surrounds the building with four round towers in the corners. It has five floors: the ground floor and the first floor are made of wood and in the three remaining ones there are openings for defence. The top floor is finished with a cover or roof to avoid water entering the castle.

The castle now has a room where there are the shields of the most important families of Álava.
