= The Empress of Mars =

2003 novella by Kage Baker

- Short story by Kage Baker
- Language: English
- Genre: Science fiction

Publication
- Published in: Asimov's Science Fiction
- Publication type: Magazine
- Publication date: July 2003
- Publication place: United States

"The Empress of Mars" is a science fiction novella by American writer Kage Baker, published in 2003. It won the 2004 Theodore Sturgeon Award and was nominated for the 2004 Hugo Award for Best Novella as well as the 2004 Nebula Award for Best Novella. The novella was expanded into a novel published in 2009.

== Plot summary ==
The Empress of Mars is set in a future in which Mars was colonized by the British Arean Company. Following the collapse of the colonization effort, a few score settlers are left to fend for themselves. The story follows Mary Griffith, a woman who owns the only bar on Mars, the titular Empress of Mars. After being let go as the xenobotanist for British Arean, she makes a new life for herself and her daughters on Mars. The story charts the gradual development of the tiny colony into a self-sufficient city. A series of new settlers arrive on Mars over the course of events, each of whom ends up becoming pivotal in the establishment of a new service for the city. Mary and her allies must contend with interference by British Arean, resistance from various local collectives and a Neo-Pagan Ephesian Church.
