= Tales from the New Republic =

1999 Star Wars anthology

Tales of the New Republic
- Editor: Peter Schweighofer; Craig Carey
- Author: Chris Cassidy; Tish Pahl; Timothy Zahn; Michael A. Stackpole; Patricia A. Jackson
- Cover artist: Paul Youll
- Language: English
- Series: Canon C
- Subject: Star Wars
- Genre: Science fiction
- Publisher: Bantam Spectra
- Publication date: December 1, 1999
- Publication place: United States
- Media type: Paperback
- Pages: 432
- ISBN: 0-553-57882-0
- Preceded by: The Truce at Bakura
- Followed by: The Glove of Darth Vader

Tales from the New Republic (1999) is an anthology of short stories set in the fictional Star Wars universe. The book is edited by Peter Schweighofer and Craig Carey.

== Contents ==
1. "Interlude at Darknell" by Timothy Zahn and Michael A. Stackpole (1 BBY)
  1. Part One by Timothy Zahn
  2. Part Two and Three by Michael A. Stackpole
  3. Part Four by Timothy Zahn
2. "Jade Solitaire" by Timothy Zahn (17 ABY)
3. "Gathering Shadows" by Kathy Burdette (4 ABY)
4. "Hutt and Seek" by Chris Cassidy and Tish Pahl (8 ABY)
5. "The Longest Fall" by Patricia A. Jackson (3 ABY)
6. "Conflict of Interest" by Laurie Burns (7 ABY)
7. "No Disintegrations, Please" by Paul Danner (4-19 ABY)
8. "Day of the Sepulchral Night" by Jean Rabe (5 ABY)
9. "Uhl Eharl Khoehng" by Patricia A. Jackson; concerns Adalric Cessius Brandl (9 ABY)
10. "The Last Hand" by Paul Danner (4 ABY)
11. "Simple Tricks" by Chris Cassidy and Tish Pahl (12 ABY)

"The Longest Fall", "Conflict of Interest", "No Distintegrations, Please", "Day of the Sepulchral Night", "Uhl Eharl Khoehng" and "The Last Hand" had previously been published in Issues 8, 11, 13 and 14 of the Star Wars Adventure Journal magazine, while "Jade Solitaire", "Gathering Shadows" and "Hutt and Seek" were originally intended to be published in the magazine's cancelled 16th and 17th Issues.
