= The Graveyard Game =

2001 novel by Kage Baker

- First Edition cover
- Author: Kage Baker
- Cover artist: Kelly Nelson
- Language: English
- Series: The Company
- Genre: Science fiction
- Publisher: Harcourt
- Publication date: January 2001
- Publication place: United States
- Media type: Print (Hardcover)
- Pages: 288
- ISBN: 0-15-100449-8
- OCLC: 43615632
- Dewey Decimal: 813/.54 21
- LC Class: PS3552.A4313 G73 2001
- Preceded by: Mendoza in Hollywood
- Followed by: The Life of the World to Come

The Graveyard Game is a science fiction novel by American writer Kage Baker, the fourth installment in the time travel series concerning the exploits of The Company.

== Plot introduction ==
The protagonists of the series are mostly immortal cyborgs, specifically the botanist Mendoza, and the Facilitator Joseph. They were recruited as children to serve the Company in its ostensible mission to preserve artifacts from the past for a better future.

Like the second novel, Sky Coyote, this is a volume which fills in background that is not apparent to Mendoza, the narrator of the first and third books. The principal characters are Joseph and his friend, the Literature Specialist Lewis. Action starts in 1996 and continues through the next 250 years. Over this period the world changes profoundly. Japan suffers violent earthquakes and sinks into the sea. Japanese society relocates to Mexico. The USA fragments into independent republics. Animal rights movements and other activists pass laws eliminating the consumption of meat, dairy products, coffee, chocolate, alcohol, tobacco and many other stimulants and foods. Los Angeles becomes an anarchic war-zone walled off from the rest of California. Terrorists use a nuclear weapon to destroy Belfast, Northern Ireland. Anti-gravity is "re-discovered", having been known to the ancient Egyptians.

=== Explanation of the novel's title ===
Graveyards, both figurative and literal, recur as a motif in the narrative. Porfirio is introduced during a traditional visit to a cemetery on the Day of the Dead festival. The repositories where cyborgs, mostly Enforcers, are held in suspended animation, are a kind of graveyard. One such has its entrance inside a tomb. Joseph has to disinter Budu from an urban park, as neat as any cemetery, and take him to a repository for revival.

== Plot summary ==
=== Frame story ===
Segments titled "Joseph in the darkness" appear before and after each of the episodes described below. Joseph, apparently talking to his father-figure, Budu, fills in historical detail in the storyline and discusses his own motivations.

=== 1996: Hollywood ===
In Mendoza in Hollywood, the botanist Mendoza and her companion Einar were thrown forward in time from 1863 to 1996 in Laurel Canyon, Los Angeles. This is supposed to be impossible, but Mendoza is a Crome generator, a psychic who cannot control her potential, and Laurel Canyon is a focus of Crome radiation (explaining its attraction for certain kinds of people over the years!).

As the action of this novel opens, Lewis is arriving at Company HQ in Laurel Canyon in 1996. Entering the building he is just in time to see Mendoza being sent back to her own time, and tries to warn her "Don't go with him!", meaning the English agent she encounters later. From his point of view, that encounter was the cause of her disappearance. She vanishes as the transfer takes place.

Lewis takes advantage of work in San Francisco to contact Joseph who is working in the hi-tech industry there. Joseph persuades him to try out a new virtual reality helmet, which turns out to have a fault that disables cyborgs' implanted monitors for 24 hours. Joseph and Lewis can now talk freely, without Company eavesdropping. Initially reluctant, Joseph drives Lewis to Bodega Bay to talk to Juan Bautista who was the last cyborg to see Mendoza. They give him a dose of VR and then pump him for information.

Juan Bautista is able to draw a picture of the man Mendoza met in 1863 and subsequently ran away with. To Joseph's shock, the man is a double for Nicholas Harpole, the religious fanatic with whom Mendoza fell in love in Tudor England, and who was subsequently burned at the stake. Joseph sees Nicholas as the main cause of Mendoza's troubles. He also hates religious fanatics of all stripes. Leaving Juan Bautista, Joseph and Lewis agree to meet from time to time as circumstances allow, and as they learn more.

=== 2025: Austin, Texas ===
A family is celebrating the "Day of the Dead" at a graveyard in Texas. The paterfamilias, actually an uncle, is Porfirio, Mendoza's Facilitator in 1863. Under cover of an electrical storm, Joseph contacts Porfirio and asks what he knows about Mendoza. Porfirio tells him Mendoza was sent back in time, Back Way Back, over 100,000 years. The Company operated resorts for rich clients back before the arrival of humans in the New World. She must have been sent there, but why? Porfirio sends Joseph on his way with one request: don't come back.

=== 2026: London, England ===
Lewis poses as an antiquarian, buying old papers and books, and comes into possession of a box which contains a picture of a man named Edward Alton Bell-Fairfax, who he recognizes as the man in the picture drawn by Juan Bautista. Further research turns up a well-born man, apparently a natural son of someone in high places, with powerful friends who guide his life. He served as an agent of various shadowy entities. Lewis contacts Joseph and they meet in London. They make a junket to the north of England.

They spend time in the country of "The Innocents", an imagined novel combining elements of Animal Farm and Watership Down. This novel and its loony fans are among the catalysts for the growing animal-rights movement which will eventually ban meat consumption in many countries. They stay at a house run by two of the more extreme fans, but Joseph has other motives. He has finally decoded some information Budu forced on him, and he means to act on it.

Under cover of another storm, Joseph sneaks out of the house, with Lewis tailing him. They uncover a secret installation in a hillside, containing many cyborgs suspended in tanks of fluid. Are Mendoza and Budu in places like this? Lewis' Company conditioning, intended to keep cyborgs out of forbidden places, causes him to re-experience his suppressed memories of being disabled and kidnapped in medieval Ireland. He begins to understand why the Company left him in South America for 700 years, until the events recorded in Sky Coyote.

=== 2142: London and Fez ===
Lewis is still researching Edward when he can. He learns that Nennius, another cyborg, was monitoring or guiding Edward, even being the headmaster of his school. Joseph seeks out Suleyman, a former Barbary Coast pirate who has built up an independent power base in Fez, Morocco. Suleyman has also found means of frustrating the Company monitoring. Suleyman reveals that he himself is working secretly against other factions, some of whom seem to be creating new diseases to wipe out humans. He implicates Budu in this, to Joseph's consternation.

Joseph and Lewis meet again in London. Joseph now has one of Suleyman's masking devices. Lewis tells him all he knows about Edward. Edward was working for people who wanted to gain possession of Santa Catalina island, off the California coast. Joseph has a meeting with Victor, who reveals that he did bring Budu down, a few hours before the San Francisco earthquake in 1906, and tells Joseph where to find him.

=== 2225: London; Irún del Mar, Spain ===
Lewis is working in a library. Finding his cover blown by a strange little man, Lewis drops out of sight and heads to Spain for another meeting with Joseph. On the way he encounters more of the strange men, and is injured with some kind of disrupter that partially disables his hand. This is not supposed to be possible, as the cyborgs have self-repair mechanisms. Told to take a vacation, he accompanies Joseph on a tour of the local archeological sites— the places where Joseph was raised, 20,000 years previously, before checking into a Company base for repairs.

=== 2275: Santa Catalina Island, California ===
Lewis has an "accidental" encounter with Nennius aboard a cruise ship, and Nennius feeds him a story about Edward. Lewis contacts Joseph, and they proceed to Santa Catalina where Lewis believes the key to the mystery is hidden. It is a trap. Lewis is taken, and Joseph severely injured. Rolling off a cliff and into the sea, he eventually washes up onshore and is able to reach one of Suleyman's mosques, from where he is taken to Suleyman himself. When he recovers, his implant has been removed. He is a free agent, but also a fugitive. If the Company ever discovers he is still alive, there will be Hell to pay. Suleyman gives him the same message as Porfirio did: go, and don't come back.

=== 2275: San Francisco and Mount Tamalpais, California ===
Joseph follows Victor's instructions and locates Budu, buried by the 1906 San Francisco earthquake. He takes the remains to one of the Company's storage facilities under Mount Tamalpais and starts the process of revivification, with help from the cyborg Abdiel, whose entire life consists of journeying between these facilities, maintaining them.

=== Joseph in the darkness ===
Joseph settles down to wait for Budu to re-activate, and tells his recovering corpse his story. He likens himself to Hamlet, for delaying too long in taking action, resulting in the deaths of all around him. But he still has 74 years until 2355...

== Characters ==
Facilitator Joseph is a major character in this novel, as he is in most of the Company stories. At the end of the previous installment, Sky Coyote, his first-person narrative concluded with him expressing a certain ill-defined unease at his life, which by then had moved from Spain to Old California to Hollywood. For the first time in his thousands of years of life he was questioning his own motives as a Company operative. Lewis's news of Mendoza's appearance in 1996, coupled with the discovery that her disappearance in 1863 had been connected with the identical twin of the man who ruined her in Elizabethan England, begins his estrangement from the organization he has served since prehistory. He finally decodes the information given to him by his own father, Budu, which reveals to him the hidden Company graveyards where damaged and inconvenient immortals sleep. The novel ends with him turned into a demon of sorts, a malevolent free spirit determined to bring doom on those who have abused him and his loved ones for so long.

Literature Specialist Lewis was introduced in Sky Coyote as a mild mannered Company flunky with no skeletons in his closet. In this novel his tragic background, both as a victim of the mysterious little men and as a man doomed to love an unattainable woman, come to the fore. Unfortunately he is soon out of his depth. As a Preserver, his ability to carry out clandestine operations is practically nonexistent. Even Joseph, normally the lead man in any deception, cannot help him when the party being deceived is the all-knowing Dr. Zeus.

Security Tech Porfirio is, in some ways, a more extreme version of Joseph. Like Joseph, he has formed a deep attachment to others, in his case the descendants of his brother. His distaste for Company work is suppressed by his need to stay in touch with his family. It is a Devil's bargain that the Company is quite happy with.

Executive Facilitator Suleyman is, at the very least, a few thousand years old, and one of the major players in the Company itself. He has the power to help Joseph, but at the same time he is suspicious of the motives of anyone outside his own sphere of influence, but especially Joseph himself. Suleyman suspects that Joseph's father Budu is behind the plagues that appear from time to time, decimating the mortals.

Facilitator Victor is a cipher, a man who knows more than he is willing to admit, and who is deeply troubled by his work for the Company. His story is told in the shorter works in the Company stories. His connection with Lewis is more important than either suspects.

The Botanist Mendoza and her lover, in his different incarnations, are the offstage, unseen characters in the story. Joseph seeks Mendoza through the Company's secret vaults, while Lewis seeks her through his investigations of Edward Alton Bell-Fairfax, who may or may not be also Nicholas Harpole, the Elizabethan religious zealot so hated by Joseph.

== Major themes ==
Joseph is concerned about Mendoza - he recruited her and more or less thinks of her as a daughter - but he is also trying to find out what happened to Budu, who recruited him and whom he regards as his father. Budu happened to have been an Enforcer, an 8-foot killing machine with mixed ancestry from humans, Neanderthals and God knows what else the Company used. Far from being monsters, Enforcers were gentle beings who only killed those who killed others.

Chapters throughout the book, all entitled "Joseph in the Darkness", seem to consist of Joseph addressing his father, relating events as decades pass between encounters with Lewis. At the end we discover where these conversations take place.

Lewis is simply in love with Mendoza. He initially contacts Joseph to try to find out why Mendoza disappeared in 1863. Through the following decades and centuries, he stumbles across clues to the Company's real origins, but in following them he may just be following a trail of breadcrumbs laid by the Company itself.

A major plot element throughout the book is that all the cyborgs have implants that transmit everything they see and hear to a central database. Much of the plot is driven by attempts to circumvent this.

Socially the book presents a dystopic view of the future. Not only does the U.S.A. fragment, California descending into anarchy, but the rise of extreme animal rights agitation and various prohibition movements means that in the future meat-eating, coffee, alcohol, tobacco, chocolate and all manner of other social and private stimulants are illegal.

In the future, Britain is somewhat resurgent as a country, despite being wracked by domestic terrorism. It also becomes clear that the Company's origins are there. People in general are not doing well, though. The population is declining in many countries, partly due to a rash of unexplained epidemics, partly due to disgust with the process of procreation itself.

== Allusions/references to actual history, geography and current science ==
New Syon House in the story is a fictional building in London. Syon House is a real mansion by the Thames, opposite Kew.

Bodega Bay is well known as the site for much of the filming of the movie The Birds. It is also close to Drake's Bay, once thought to be the site of Sir Francis Drake's landing on the American mainland. One of the main plot points of this series is the discovery of certain artifacts on Santa Catalina by members of the Drake expedition.
