= Black Projects, White Knights =

Black Projects, White Knights: The Company Dossiers
- First edition cover
- Author: Kage Baker
- Cover artist: J. K. Potter
- Language: English
- Series: The Company
- Genre: Science fiction
- Publisher: Golden Gryphon Press
- Publication date: September 2002
- Publication place: United States
- Media type: Print (hardcover)
- Pages: 288
- ISBN: 1-930846-11-8
- OCLC: 49225258
- Dewey Decimal: 813/.54 21
- LC Class: PS3552.A4313 B55 2002

Black Projects, White Knights is a collection of short stories by American writer Kage Baker, published by small-press science fiction publisher Golden Gryphon Press, assembling various short stories set in the universe of The Company series, which comprises the bulk of her published fiction. Almost all of the stories contained within this volume have been published previously in the pages of Asimov's Science Fiction, with the remainder being previously unpublished. Note: not all of the Company stories extant at the time of publishing were collected into this volume.

== Contents ==
The stories in this volume are:

- "Introduction: The Hounds of Zeus": A brief introduction to the world of The Company.
- "Noble Mold": Mendoza and Joseph attempt to secure a special plant from a Native American family living in 19th century Mission California.
- "Smart Alec": On the origins of the mysteriously talented Alec Checkerfield.
- "Facts Relating to the Arrest of Dr. Kalugin": Vasilii Kalugin has a bad week in the company of a very old Company operative.
- "Old Flat Top": A young Cro-Magnon learns some facts about how his valley came to be settled from the Enforcer Joshua.
- "The Dust Enclosed Here": A simulacrum of William Shakespeare encounters Alec Checkerfield and comes out of the experience changed.
- "The Literary Agent": Robert Louis Stevenson hallucinates a strangely contemporary encounter with a Mephistophelean figure who helps him rediscover his inspiration.
- "Lemuria Will Rise": Mendoza encounters an eccentric hermit in 19th century Pismo Beach.
- "The Wreck of the Gladstone": Victor and Kalugin have to recover Company property from a wreck off the coast of Los Angeles without damaging the local mortals too badly.
- "Monster Story": Young Alec Checkerfield goes to take his exams.
- "Hanuman": Mendoza gets hit on by an augmented australopithecine with a story to tell about his tragic upbringing.
- "Studio Dick Drowns Near Malibu": Joseph goes to shed one mortal identity and assume a new one, but first he has to resolve a complication.
- "The Likely Lad": Alec Checkerfield and his amoral pet artificial intelligence take to the high seas.
- "The Queen in Yellow": Literature Preservation Specialist Lewis is given a job on a dig in Egypt for which he is poorly suited.
- "The Hotel at Harlan's Landing": A storm on the coast of California during the Great Depression where Company secrets are revealed, and more questions posed.

The story "Smart Alec" was later incorporated into the novel The Life of the World to Come.

The story "The Literary Agent" runs counter to other Company stories in that it shows Joseph using a time travel capsule as a routine tool. The basis for much of the backstory is that the time travel technology is too expensive and risky for this.

In "Monster Story", Alec Checkerfield "helps" another boy to answer the test questions, resulting in that boy being committed to a "special" school for those with deviant psychological profiles. In a later story a character, who is apparently that boy grown up, leads the Company's "Adonai" project, which results in the birth of Alec Checkerfield.
