= Rigoberto Mendoza =

Rigoberto Mendoza may refer to:

- Rigoberto Mendoza (basketball) (born 1992), Dominican basketball player
- Rigoberto Mendoza (marathon) (born 1946), Cuban retired marathon runner
- Minnie Mendoza (Rigoberto Mendoza, 1934–2024), Cuban baseball player
