= Daus Mendoza =

American social media influencer (born 2005)

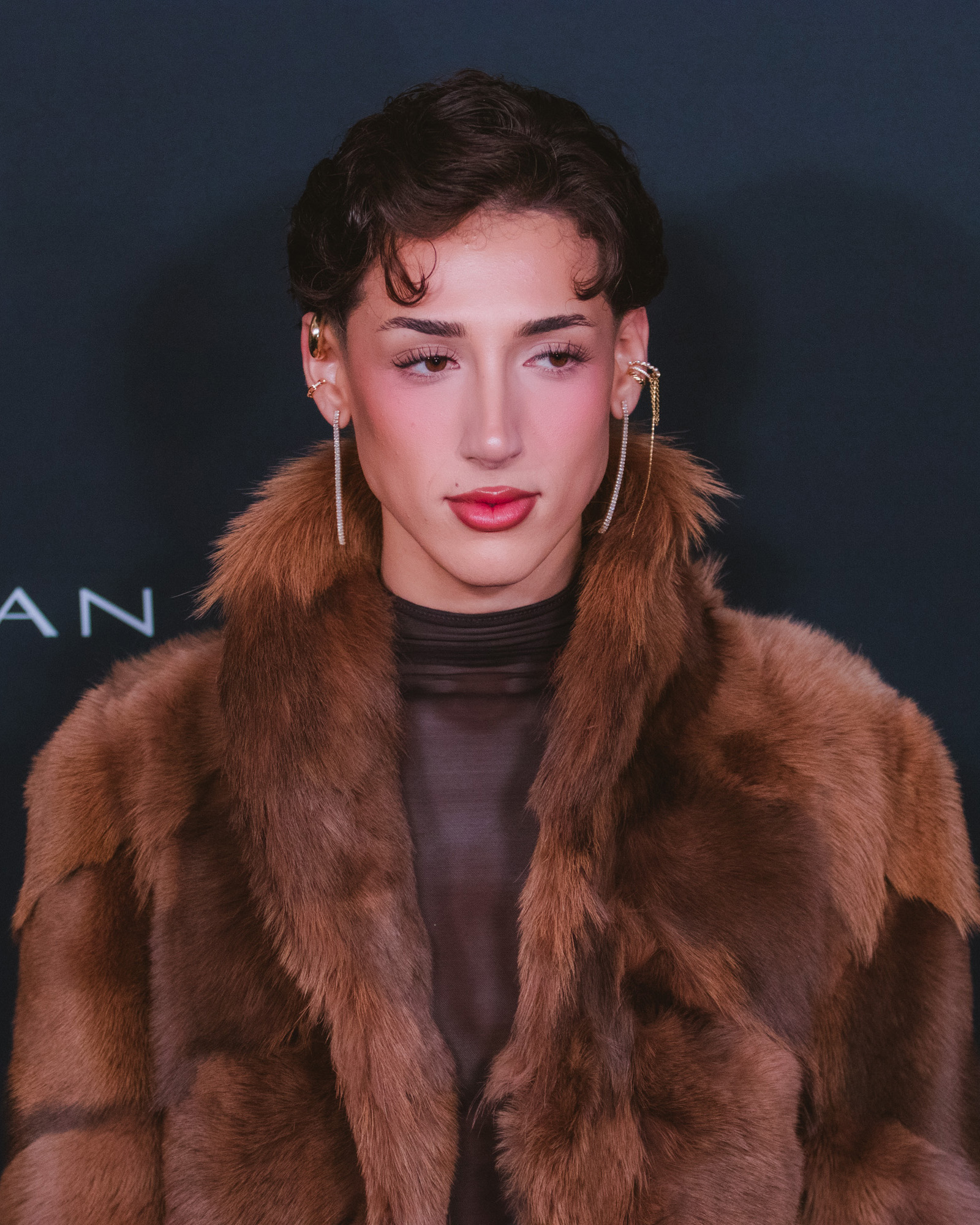
- Mendoza in 2026
- Born: Daus Mendoza; May 8, 2005 (age 21); Fountain Valley, California, U.S.
- Occupations: Influencer; make-up artist; content creator
- Years active: 2021–present
- Height: 1.85 m (6 ft 1 in)

Instagram information
- Page: dausmendoza
- Followers: 880 thousand (September 28, 2025)

TikTok information
- Page: daus_mendoza
- Followers: 5.7 million

YouTube information
- Channel: Daus Mendoza
- Genres: Vlog; makeup; beauty; fashion
- Subscribers: 228 thousand
- Views: 26.8 million

Daus Mendoza (born May 8, 2005) is a Mexican-American influencer, make-up artist and content creator. He is best known for his bold fashion sense, colorful makeup looks, and engaging Get Ready With Me (GRWM) videos. By 2024, he had become one of the most recognizable young LGBTQ+ collaborating with major beauty brands.

== Early life ==
Mendoza was born on May 8, 2005, in Fountain Valley, California, United States to a family of Mexican descent. Growing up in Southern California, he developed an early interest in makeup and fashion, experimenting with bright colors and unique styles while still in middle school.

== Career ==
Mendoza began his social media career in October 2021 when he started posting videos on TikTok. His early content featured lip-sync clips and casual fashion posts, but he quickly gained a following for his makeup tutorials and GRWM videos. By 2022, Mendoza’s TikTok audience had grown into the hundreds of thousands, and he expanded to Instagram to share longer-form fashion and beauty content.

In 2024, Mendoza was named to GLAAD’s 20 Under 20 list, highlighting influential LGBTQ+ creators making a positive cultural impact and featured on Teen Vogue magazine. In 2025, he began collaborating with major beauty brands, including Rare Beauty by Selena Gomez and ONE/SIZE by Patrick Starrr. The same year, he launched a signature on makeup collection with Glamlite Beauty brand, which featured an eyeshadow palette, blushes, and lip products inspired by his vibrant personal aesthetic. In September 2025, he joined the fashion industry as he founded his clothing brand namely Dausnamic.

== Accolades ==
Year	Association	Category	Nominated works	Result	Ref.
2024	GLAAD’s 20 Under 20	Influential LGBTQ+ Creators	Himself	Honoured	
