= Gods and Pawns =

2007 collection of short stories by Kage Baker

- First edition cover
- Author: Kage Baker
- Cover artist: Paul Youll
- Language: English
- Series: The Company
- Genre: Science fiction
- Publisher: Tor Books
- Publication date: January 2007
- Publication place: United States
- Media type: Print (hardcover)
- Pages: 335
- ISBN: 0-765-31552-1
- OCLC: 70867042
- Dewey Decimal: 813/.54 22
- LC Class: PS3552.A4313 G63 2007

Gods and Pawns is a collection of science fiction short stories by American writer Kage Baker, published by Tor Books. The stories are set in the same universe as her series about The Company.

== Background ==
Operating in the 24th century, a group of scientists and businessmen has created immortal cyborgs at different times throughout history. These loyal servants preserve items from the past for the Company to sell, at huge profit. Recruited as very young children, the cyborgs leave their humanity behind. There are exceptions, however.

== Contents ==
- "To the Land Beyond the Sunset" — In 17th-century Yucatan, Literature Specialist Lewis wins a vacation from Company base New World One and decides to take Mendoza with him to Amazonia. They discover an unnaturally fertile land where gods are mortal and one mortal in particular pays the terrible price of being the fertility deity. Though based on real research about the Amazonian "terra preta", Baker explains it differently.
- "The Catch" — an early Company attempt at creating an immortal servant went badly wrong in 1964, and now a time-traveling rogue is loose. Bobby Ross loves 1951, the year of Hank Bauer's famous World Series catch, and he will live through that year over and over. Security Tech Porfirio is on the case.
- "The Angel in the Darkness" — Porfirio's brother's descendants have fallen on hard times in 1991 Los Angeles. Another Company rogue, a self-appointed Angel of Death, is stalking them. Porfirio would intervene, but he is supposed to be dead.
- "Standing in his Light" — Facilitator Van Drouten introduces Johannes Vermeer to the "camera obscura" and has him run off six dozen canvasses for the Company to sell centuries later. To help him out, she also teaches him photography.
- "A Night on the Barbary Coast" (originally in "The Silver Gryphon", 2003) — Facilitator Joseph goes in search of a gold claim and its miner. He takes Botanist Mendoza to the wild and woolly San Francisco of the Gold Rush. She turns out to be much more help than he expected. This short story won the first of the Norton awards in 2003.
- "Welcome to Olympus, Mr. Hearst!" — In 1933 the famous publisher is looking for a new lease on life. Facilitator Joseph is there to seal the deal. Lewis tags along with a valuable movie-script to hide in the mansion. Nothing goes right. Theft and a bogus spiritual medium, along with some star cameos, create a story whose outcome astonishes even Joseph.
- "Hellfire at Twilight" — In 18th-century England, Lewis has to steal a fabled scroll from the underground lair of the notorious Hellfire Club, and becomes a god for a night.
