= Sky Coyote =

1999 novel by Kage Baker

- First Edition cover
- Author: Kage Baker
- Cover artist: Michael Koelsch
- Language: English
- Series: The Company
- Genre: Science fiction
- Publisher: Harcourt
- Publication date: 1999
- Publication place: United States
- Media type: Print (hardcover)
- Pages: 310
- ISBN: 0-15-100354-8
- OCLC: 38833366
- Dewey Decimal: 813/.54 21
- LC Class: PS3552.A4313 S58 1999
- Preceded by: In The Garden of Iden
- Followed by: Mendoza in Hollywood

Sky Coyote is a science fiction novel by American writer Kage Baker. It is the second in the series of The Company, which began with In The Garden of Iden and continues with Mendoza in Hollywood. American illustrator Michael Koelsch painted the cover art of Baker's first three novels in The Company series, including Sky Coyote.

== Plot introduction ==
The preceding novel, In The Garden of Iden, introduced the Botanist Mendoza, from her time of recruitment in the dungeons of the Spanish Inquisition to her love affair with a mortal in Tudor England, followed by her being sent to base New World One in the Americas. Her recruiter and also her superior on the England mission was a much older operative, Joseph, who is the narrator of this novel. The story begins almost 150 years after Mendoza's arrival at New World One, when Joseph arrives there in the dying days of 1699 with a new mission in California. This episode focuses on operatives Lewis, Latif and Imarte, all of whom have roles in future stories.

== Plot summary ==
Joseph's latest role is that of Sky Coyote, the trickster, the foolish one, the animal god of many Native American traditions. He will play it for the Chumash, a tribe in California in the late 17th century. His job is to persuade the village of Humashup to give up their entire lifestyle, which the company will take and "preserve," while the Chumash are shipped out to work in a Company facility. The Spanish are coming soon, and the Chumash culture will be wiped out along with all the others.

Of course, Joseph can't do this alone. He assembles a small army of his kind, including the erratic and moody botanist Mendoza, whom he occasionally regrets recruiting in 16th-century Spain; the anthropologist and former Babylonian Imarte; who is not averse to bedding her subjects to get more data; and many other specialists. Joseph is the Master of Ceremonies, however. He's also wearing a lot of non-standard equipment to turn him into a cavorting, fast talking (and priapic) god.

The Chumash are depicted as a settled society with a structured social and economic system. They are described as a skilled craftsmen whose daily life centers on work, communal events, and religious practices. Social and institutional functions are fulfilled by organizations such as the kantap, which serves roles comparable to community or civic institutions. Guild-like structures regulate the distribution of goods and services within the community. The narrative also portrays commercial activity, including individuals engagded in trade and negotiation. The character Joseph interacts with the Chumash, noting both their familiarity with everyday social structures and their surprise at his presence, before successfully completing his task.

There are snags, but not the usual kind. For a start, actual 24th-century Company operatives have come back to supervise. They are disgusted that the cyborgs eat meat, drink alcohol and consume other stimulants banned in their era. The cyborgs are not too impressed with the childish, phobia-ridden operatives either, but a job is a job. Mendoza starts her feud with Imarte, which continues in the next installment. There is a messianic religion encroaching on Chumash territory. This gets Joseph's hackles up. Nature throws in an earthquake or two.

The Chumash go to their reward, the Company gets all the valuable information and samples it needs to sell to the rich and not-so-smart in the 24th century, and Joseph is left with a nagging doubt. For one thing, why does nobody know what happens after 2355, even though all history is available to the cyborgs up to that point? And why do cyborgs who talk too much about this tend to get suddenly reassigned? Why do the 24th-century people seem so cowardly and stupid? Didn't they go all the way back to 30,000 BC to start the ball rolling? Or was it 40,000? Nobody is quite sure.

However, Joseph is mostly satisfied, but unfulfilled and, at his core, unhappy. Mendoza has been released to wander the redwood forest, a dream task for the botanist. Joseph believes that in 1923 he saw her with a mortal she fell for in Tudor England, but that story is not completed in this volume. Joseph has more or less adopted Mendoza as his daughter, though he cannot admit it. By the end of the book he has become a 20th-century Hollywood studio executive, hiding artifacts of the era for the company.

== Characters ==
- Joseph, Facilitator par excellence. Like all agents of The company, Joseph is an immortal cyborg. He is older than most, having been converted from a human child in about 20,000 BC, give or take a thousand. Since he was about to have his brains bashed in when he was taken, he thinks he came out of it pretty well. Joseph has always been a Company man, playing role after role for them as they 'preserve' the past for 'discovery' in the future, a business which is very lucrative indeed.
- Budu, seen only in Joseph's flashbacks, Budu is the archaic Homo sapiens Enforcer who recruited Joseph, and who Joseph considers to be his father. Few in the Company know about Enforcers, who were part of an old Company mission to slaughter violent groups in pre-historical times. Now, almost no Enforcers are left. Budu warns Joseph of some potential ill-doings surrounding their disappearance, and implants in Joseph a file with more information, which Joseph refuses to open.

== Allusions/references to actual history, geography and current science ==
The Chumash were a real tribe in the location described. The monotheistic Chinigchinix religion which threatens them, and is in turn threatened by encroaching colonialism, was also real; although it was not necessarily as oppressive and violent as it is portrayed here.
