= Mendoza in Hollywood =

2000 novel by Kage Baker

- First edition cover
- Author: Kage Baker
- Cover artist: Michael Koelsch
- Language: English
- Series: The Company
- Genre: Science fiction novel
- Publisher: Harcourt
- Publication date: February 2000
- Publication place: United States
- Media type: Print (hardcover)
- Pages: 336
- ISBN: 0-15-100448-X
- OCLC: 41035354
- Dewey Decimal: 813/.54 21
- LC Class: PS3552.A4313 M46 2000
- Preceded by: Sky Coyote
- Followed by: The Graveyard Game

Mendoza in Hollywood is a science fiction novel by American writer by Kage Baker; it is the third novel in her series concerning the activities of The Company. In the UK, it was published as At the Edge of the West. American illustrator Michael Koelsch painted the cover art of Baker's first three novels in The Company series including Mendoza in Hollywood.

== Plot introduction ==
The narrator is the botanist Mendoza. What we are reading is apparently her confession of why she deserted her post and ran away with a mortal, and then violently killed the six others responsible for his death.

== Plot summary ==
As the novel opens, Mendoza is walking through incessant rain in the hills above old Los Angeles. It is winter, 1862, and to the east America is at war with itself. For over 150 years, Mendoza has lived wild in the Pacific coast forest, collecting and cataloging plant species, and rarely interacting with anybody else, human or cyborg. This existence suits her fine, and she resents being commanded down to Cahuenga Pass for a special mission. As usual, however, she wants to be a "good little machine". She already knows what the mission is. The rain will be followed by a long drought, and there will be much to be preserved, which would otherwise be lost. What the drought cannot eradicate, starving cattle will. Meanwhile, smallpox will reduce the local population, especially the Native Americans.

Arriving at the Inn at the pass, she quickly meets her fellow cyborgs, the Facilitator Porfirio, Anthropologist Oscar, Zoologist Einar, Ornithologist Juan Bautista, and the Anthropologist Imarte, with whom she renews her ongoing feud. With all the traffic passing by, the Inn is a perfect cover for Company research and other work. However, when Mendoza arrives, the main problem is lighting a fire to cook dinner given that everything is soaked by the rain.

Mendoza's first night is a rough one as she dreams incessantly of Nicholas Harpole, her lover in 16th century England who was burned at the stake. She is woken by Porfirio, who tells her she has been blasting the place with "Crome radiation", the blue radiance of psychic activity. She dismisses his concerns, yet she worries about this sudden resurgence of her previous troubles.

Later, she is led into the hills by Einar to collect samples in the "Temperate Belt" that will be severely affected by the drought. This just happens to follow the future path of Sunset Boulevard. Along the way, Einar has to kill one of the locals. The hills are infested with bandits, crazy pioneers, and other mortals likely to shoot first and warn later. Mendoza is shocked - cyborgs are programmed to run from danger and not harm mortals. Einar informs her that the rules are different here. She is even given a Navy pistol to use if necessary.

The Inn's inhabitants pass the time with movies supplied by the company. In one chapter, we get a long and reverent description of them watching D.W. Griffith's Intolerance, with Einar as Chorus describing every scene. Since Imarte was actually alive in Babylon, one of the movie's famous settings, we hear much about what life was really like.

Everything is thrown into tumult, however, when Mendoza decides to forage in Laurel Canyon. The place is known to be saturated with Crome radiation from a bizarre underground quartz formation. It is this which will attract so many unusual people to the site in the 20th century, and give rise to many of the underground stories of Hollywood. Despite precautions and a lot of very futuristic equipment, Mendoza and Einar suddenly find themselves thrown forward in time to 1996. Mendoza the botanist is suddenly in urban LA, where the soil is concrete and the major life form is the automobile.

Staggering up to a Company safe house whose future location they know, they are hastily taken inside by the staff, who have been expecting this event. Horses and all, they are placed in a Time Transfer chamber for return to their own time, but at the last minute Mendoza sees the cyborg Lewis enter the building. Lewis had befriended Mendoza at the facility New World One and she suspected he was in love with her. Lewis makes an attempt to talk to Mendoza, and tries to warn her "Don't go with him!". She has no idea what he means, and in any case, the transfer takes place before any more can be said.

Returning to the Inn, short one horse which died from the Transfer, Mendoza confronts Porfirio. He must have known what was going to happen to her. He grudgingly admits he knew something, but was just told to let it happen. He also knew only what he needed to know, and nothing more.

The drought starts to bite, and Mendoza is going further and further around the bend. Her lover haunts her dreams every night, and the resulting Crome's radiation provides nocturnal fireworks for her colleagues. She can no longer do any real work. Then one of Imarte's clients leaves behind a briefcase with amazing documents in it. They seem to relate to a British plot to exploit the disarray in the United States and take over the Channel Islands, specifically Santa Catalina. From there, a few well-armed ships could control the seas of Western North America. Imarte records all the papers and heads for San Francisco to do more research. All the others are called away also, except for Mendoza and Juan Bautista, who has finally allowed his pets to be shipped out with all the other biological samples.

At this point, Mendoza is astonished by the arrival of her ex-lover, Nicholas Harpole, except that he does not recognize her and goes by the name of Edward Alton Bell-Fairfax, an Englishman with mysterious intentions. Mistaking her for Imarte's assistant, he requests the usual service. Mendoza eagerly complies.

Soon Edward reveals he has come for the briefcase. However he is also intrigued by Mendoza, who shows sexual sophistication despite being virgo intacta - apparently the healing capability of the cyborg physiology has gone to extremes in her. She is able to persuade him to take her away, as she will enable him to avoid U.S. agents hot on his trail as he goes to meet his fellow conspirators.

Once more Mendoza embarks on an idyll, as they trek to San Pedro, and then to Santa Catalina, where a mysterious sailing ship awaits. Edward starts to show unexpected abilities, especially in being aware of things that humans usually cannot perceive. But then the ship turns out to be a trap, set by the Pinkertons. Edward is killed while disposing of the incriminating documents, and Mendoza finally snaps. She goes into overdrive, killing all the agents. When the British finally show up, she throws assorted body parts at them, whereupon they flee.

In the rest of the story Mendoza, having completed her confession, awaits her punishment. In the meantime, she examines her considerable store of information about the history of old LA, noticing for the first time how Santa Catalina has some kind of significance in the activities of the company. Apparently something on the island is vital to the actual creation of the company, but what?

Before she can pursue this further, she is put in a Time Transfer box and sent Back Way Back, or in more usual terms, to about 150,000 BCE. She is left on Santa Catalina itself, still forested rather than the barren island of later millennia. Her job is to raise food for a Company resort on Santa Cruz Island, where rich folks come back to hobnob with mastodons and hunt saber-tooths, or maybe vice versa. Her memory has been interfered with, so she can no longer remember details of the history she once knew. She also has a mission to alert the Company when certain unusual beings show up to colonize the center of the island. Apparently they have something the Company needs....

Mendoza seems hopelessly trapped. Can she survive to the 19th century all over again, or is her immortality as suspect as other things have become? Twice now she has met her demon lover. She knows he will come for her again.

== Characters ==
- Anthropologist Imarte is doing her research the old-fashioned way, by playing the part of "lady of easy virtue" and recording the things her customers tell her.
- Einar is obsessed by Hollywood, since he is also a Film Preservation Specialist, a role he expects to play when the region is urbanized. For him, every patch of scrub is the site of some notable future place, event, or scene in a movie. Meanwhile, he collects examples of California Brown Bear, and the local coyote subspecies, both of which are shortly to be extinct.
- Juan Bautista, who happens to have been born one of the last remaining Channel Island Indians, with the silver hair that comes with the ancestry, insists on keeping a pet condor and pelican inside rather than in the outhouses. The others are not happy with the noise and smell. As movie-obsessed as any cyborg, Juan Bautista names the condor Erich von Stroheim, after the future movie director, and the pelican Marie Dressler, after a future academy-award-winning actress born in the second half of the 19th century. Unfortunately "Erich" cannot bear to be parted from Juan Bautista, and makes everyone's life unbearable whenever this happens. Later Juan Bautista confiscates an eagle from a passing stagecoach, and names the bird John Barrymore.
- Anthropologist Oscar plays the role of go-getting salesman to the hilt. He is having trouble unloading some of his more expensive items, such as the brass-bound Yankee pie cupboard. With no Yankees to speak of in the area, pies are not a common menu item. However his real purpose is to gain entry to people's houses so he can record their lives. Still, it would be quite a coup to unload that cupboard.
- Porfirio presides over all this while keeping watch on his "family," or at least his brother's descendants. Both he and his brother were orphaned, but only Porfirio was suitable for conversion to cyborg, so the Company placed the brother with foster parents. Porfirio has been carrying out his mother's last wish to look after his baby brother. For 300 years.

== Allusions and references to history, geography and current science ==
Many real places and people feature in this novel. The action takes place in Cahuenga Pass, by modern Hollywood, old Los Angeles, San Pedro, and the island of Santa Catalina. The time is the 1860s, concurrent with the American Civil War. References are made to personalities such as Phineas Banning and his stagecoach company.

When thrown forward in time, Mendoza and Einar, along with their horses, find themselves alongside a busy 20th century highway. This appears to be Laurel Canyon Boulevard. They then proceed up a ridge to houses, first on Vulcan Drive, then along Mt. Olympus Drive to Zeus Drive, where the company has a facility. These are all real locations.

== Reception ==
F&SF reviewer Charles de Lint gave the novel a mixed review. "There are all sorts of interesting things going on in it. But the book is slow going since it takes about two thirds of the way through before much of a plot kicks in. . . . That first half to two thirds of Mendoza in Hollywood does make for an engrossing, if desultory reading experience."
