= Kage Baker =

American writer (1952–2010)

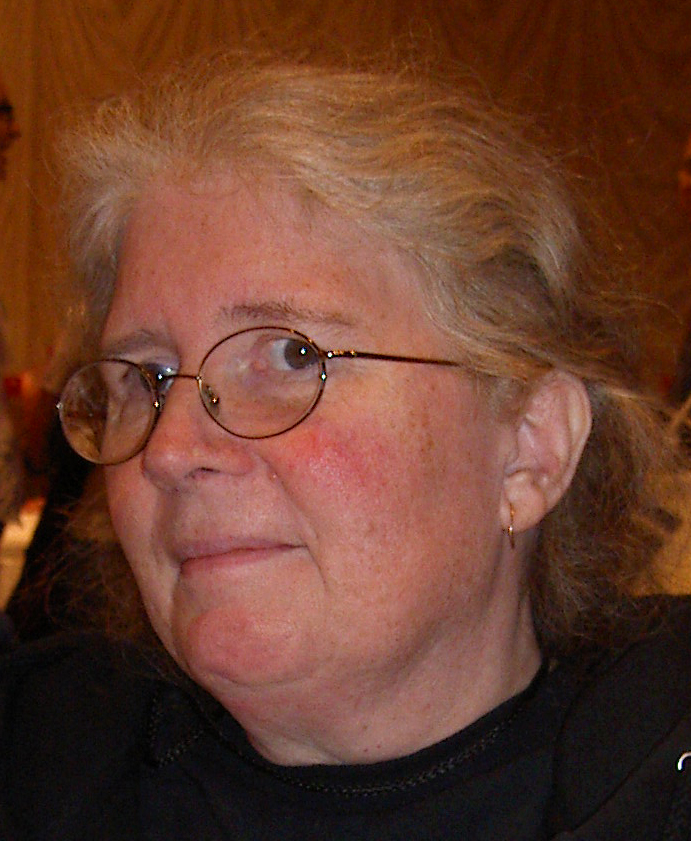
- Kage Baker in 2009
- Born: Mary Kate Genevieve Baker; June 10, 1952; Hollywood, California, United States
- Died: January 31, 2010 (aged 57); Pismo Beach, California, United States
- Occupation: Writer
- Writing career
- Period: 1997–2010
- Genres: Science fiction Fantasy
- Website: kagebaker.com (archived)

Kage Baker (June 10, 1952 – January 31, 2010) was an American science fiction and fantasy writer.

== Biography ==
Baker was born and raised in Hollywood, California, and lived in Pismo Beach later in life. Before becoming a professional writer she spent many years in theater, including teaching Elizabethan English as a second language. Baker had Asperger syndrome.

She is best known for her "the Company/Dr. Zeus, Inc." series of historical time travel science fiction. Her first stories were published in Asimov's Science Fiction in 1997, and her first novel, In the Garden of Iden, by Hodder & Stoughton in the same year. Other notable works include Mendoza in Hollywood (novel, 2000) and "The Empress of Mars" (novella, 2003), which won the Theodore Sturgeon Award and was nominated for a Hugo Award.

In 2008, she donated her archive to the department of Rare Books and Special Collections at Northern Illinois University.

In 2009, her short story "Caverns of Mystery" and her novel House of the Stag were both nominated for World Fantasy Awards; neither piece won.

In January 2010, it was reported that Baker was seriously ill with cancer. She died from uterine cancer on January 31, 2010, in Pismo Beach, California.

In 2010, Baker's The Women of Nell Gwynne's was nominated for a Hugo Award and a World Fantasy Award in the Best Novella categories. On May 15, 2010, that work was awarded the 2009 Nebula Award in the Best Novella category.

Kage spent much of the last year of her life watching and reviewing silent films. Many of her reviews were collected posthumously into Ancient Rockets: Treasures and Trainwrecks of the Silent Screen (2011), edited by her sister Kathleen Bartholomew. From the foreword:

All these reviews were written during the last year of Kage's life. I don't think that affected her view much—sometimes she was so tired that watching films and composing reviews was all she could manage, so they got her nearly undivided attention. As the year wore on, more and more of them were composed ex tempore and dictated to me; I think there is a more conversational style in those, as we argued out the reviews. One she recited in a single long soliloquy in her hospital room; it was written that evening, as I doggedly transferred Kage's voice from my head to paper.

The last one is dated December 21, 2009. Three days later, we discovered her cancer had metastasized to her brain. A month later, she was gone.

Baker left an unfinished novel, Nell Gwynne's On Land and At Sea, which was completed by her sister Kathleen Bartholomew based on extensive notes left by Baker, and was published in 2012.

== Bibliography ==
=== The Company universe ===
Novels

- In the Garden of Iden (1997)
- Sky Coyote (1999)
- Mendoza in Hollywood (2000) (published in the UK as At the Edge of the West)
- The Graveyard Game (2001)
- The Life of the World to Come (2004)
- The Children of the Company (2005)
- The Machine's Child (2006)
- The Sons of Heaven (2007)
- The Empress of Mars (2009) (novel version)
- Not Less than Gods (2010)
- Nell Gwynne's On Land and At Sea (2012)

Short story collections

- Black Projects, White Knights: The Company Dossiers (2002)
- Gods and Pawns (2007)
- In the Company of Thieves (2013)

Short stories and novellas

- The Empress of Mars (2003) (novella version)
- The Angel in the Darkness (limited edition chapbook, 2003)
- Where the Golden Apples Grow (2006) (novella)
- Rude Mechanicals (2007)
- The Women of Nell Gwynne's (limited edition, 2009) (Also released as 'Nell Gwynne's Scarlet Spy')

=== Novels ===
- The Hotel Under the Sand (2009) (juvenile) Tachyon Publications

The Anvil of the World

- The Anvil of the World (2003)
- The House of the Stag (2008) (Prequel to The Anvil of the World)
- The Bird of the River (2010)

=== Short fiction ===
Collections

- Mother Ægypt and Other Stories (2004) (title story takes place in the Company universe)
- Dark Mondays (2006)
- The Best of Kage Baker (2012) (includes stories set in and out of the Company universe)

Stories

Title	Year	First published	Reprinted/collected	Notes
Or Else My Lady Keeps the Key	2008			Novella
Pareidolia	2015	Bartolomew, Kathleen & Kage Barker (March 2015). "Pareidolia". Asimov's Science Fiction. 39 (3): 22–39.		Novelette

=== Non-fiction ===
- Ancient Rockets: Treasures and Trainwrecks of the Silent Screen, ed. Kathleen Bartholomew (2011) Tachyon Publications
