= Mendoza, Álava =

Hamlet in Álava, Spain

Mendoza
- Concejo
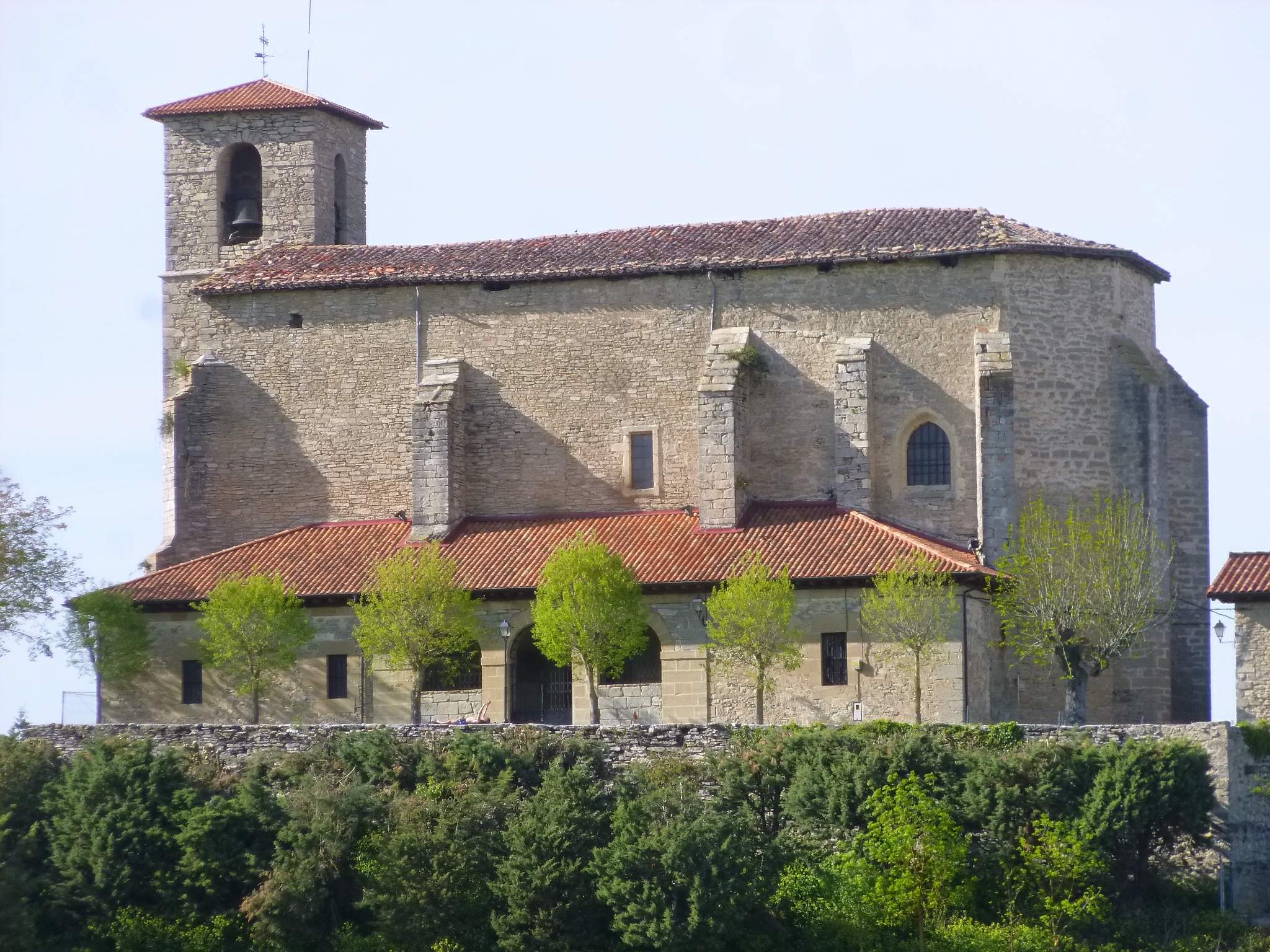
- Church of San Esteban in Mendoza

- Location within Álava Location within the Basque Country Location within Spain
- Coordinates: 42°52′N 2°47′W
- Country: Spain
- Autonomous community: Basque Country
- Province: Álava
- Comarca: Vitoria-Gasteiz
- Municipality: Vitoria-Gasteiz
- Elevation: 521 m (1,709 ft)

Population (2021)
  - Total: 107
- Postal code: 01191

Mendoza (Spanish pronunciation: [menˈdoθa], Basque pronunciation: [mendos̻a]) is a hamlet and concejo located in the municipality of Vitoria-Gasteiz, in Álava province, Basque Country, Spain.
