= The Life of the World to Come =

2004 novel by Kage Baker

- First edition cover
- Author: Kage Baker
- Cover artist: Paul Youll
- Language: English
- Series: The Company
- Genre: Science fiction
- Publisher: Tor Books
- Publication date: December 2004
- Publication place: United States
- Media type: Print (hardcover)
- Pages: 336
- ISBN: 0-7653-1132-1
- OCLC: 55036769
- Dewey Decimal: 813/.54 22
- LC Class: PS3552.A4313 L54 2004
- Preceded by: The Graveyard Game
- Followed by: The Children of the Company

The Life of the World to Come (2004) is a science fiction novel by American writer Kage Baker, the fifth installment in the time travel series concerning the exploits of The Company.

== Plot introduction ==
This novel is another chapter in the disastrous life of the cyborg botanist Mendoza who was recruited by the Company in 16th century Spain and exiled to the far past. Twice in her life, the same man, under different identities, visited her, became her lover, and was killed. In both instances, he didn't seem to know her at first.

Alec Checkerfield is a 24th-century data pirate and smuggler who steals a time machine. He encounters Mendoza. She encounters him. It's deja vu all over again for her, and he is mystified. This meeting catalyzes the most horrific event in human history. All involved are left wondering what they have done and why. Meanwhile, Dr. Zeus seems to go from strength to strength.

== Plot summary ==
The first part is an extension of the first person accounts previously supplied by Mendoza, which accounts are apparently previous chapters in her journal, written on any material she can get. Somehow all of this manages to stay intact for the unknown amount of time, perhaps 3000 years, that Mendoza spends in exile on Santa Catalina. The period is uncertain because Mendoza herself cannot remember living through some portions of it. From time to time she looks down at her plants, and next time she looks up months or years have slipped by. She may just be doing the cyborg version of 'zoning out', but since she has already slipped forward in time once, there's no telling what might be happening. What is certain is that she is about 150,000 years in the past, growing fruit and vegetables for a Company resort on Santa Cruz island.

One day, a man shows up in a Company Time Shuttle. These previously unknown vessels let the Company ship tourists back to the past, but can only be piloted by cyborgs. Nonetheless, the man is the image of her two previous lovers, and she does unto him what she did unto them. This time, however, he leaves behind genetic material when he goes back to the future. She is able to learn from this that he is no more human than she, but in a different way. His name is Alec Checkerfield.

Next we learn about "Smart Alec", precocious scion of rich privileged 24th century Londoners, who leave him in the care of their housekeepers so they can get on with their lives away from dismal, puritanical England. Alec affects all around him, especially machines. Given a highly controlled moral teaching unit at a young age, he is able to re-program it by instinct to become his personal assistant and, eventually, partner in crime. This entity becomes "The Captain", after the pirate Captain Morgan. They resolve to rule the oceans of the world, using smuggling to pay the bills. Since meat, alcohol, chocolate etc. are illegal in most of the developed world, this is both easy and lucrative.

With the assistance of the Captain, Alec outwits the company and becomes master of his own time machine. This is in no small part thanks to Mendoza, who disables the self-destruct device on the one he initially stole from the company. However, at the peak of his achievements, he finds he has committed one of the most heinous crimes of history. He, Mendoza and the Inklings all become aware of their parts in this. All are left desolated, filled with self-loathing and worse.

== Characters ==
Alec Checkerfield grows up in 24th century London, part of a privileged class of Administrators. Alec is different. He instinctively understands computers, and can impose his will on others to some extent. At first he uses these abilities to get the usual things, money, women etc., but then he comes to the attention of Dr. Zeus Inc., which operates openly at this time. Warned by his Artificial Intelligence companion, "The Captain", that a person he is talking to is a cyborg, he makes an exit from the Company offices, and begins to work on finding out the truth, while living off the proceeds of smuggling alcohol, chocolate, coffee, meat and other illegal commodities.

Alec Checkerfield, Nicholas Harpole, and Edward Alton Bell-Fairfax are one and the same, or at least different versions of the same man, created for the Adonai project. Genetically they are tetraploid, which means that even if Mendoza were still human, there would be certain obstacles to her enjoying full connubial bliss with any one of them.

The "New Inklings" are idle geniuses who have, at least in their own minds, designed and deployed, from their lofty perches in the 24th century, all the Enforcers, Facilitators, Preservers and other cyborgs working for the Company throughout history. Given how much trouble it was to deal with the Enforcers once they stopped being useful, since they could hardly be passed off as normal humans, they begin the project Adonai, creating a non-cyborg human who will have the qualities they want and be easier to control, not to mention kill if necessary. Their first test run involves a man in Tudor England who grows up to be Nicholas Harpole....

== Major themes ==
In previous episodes, Santa Catalina Island off California seems to be a focus of Company attention and the key to its history. In this episode one learns more of what is there, and how Mendoza's lovers, and indirectly the "New Inklings," played a part in its initial discovery, which gave rise to the Company itself.

Other major players in previous novels, such as Joseph and Lewis, do not appear here. In fact the only cyborg named is Mendoza herself.
