= Timothy Zahn bibliography =

A list of works by, or about, American science fiction and fantasy author Timothy Zahn.

== Star Wars universe ==
=== Thrawn trilogy ===
- Heir to the Empire (1991)
- Dark Force Rising (1992)
- The Last Command (1993)

=== Hand of Thrawn duology ===
- Specter of the Past (1997)
- Vision of the Future (1998)

=== Thrawn series ===
- Thrawn (2017)
- Thrawn: Alliances (2018)
- Thrawn: Treason (2019)

=== Thrawn Ascendancy ===
- Thrawn Ascendancy: Chaos Rising (2020)
- Thrawn Ascendancy: Greater Good (2021)
- Thrawn Ascendancy: Lesser Evil (2021)

=== Other Star Wars novels ===
- Survivor's Quest (2004)
- Outbound Flight (2006)
- Allegiance (2007)
- Choices of One (2011)
- Scoundrels (2012)

=== Graphic novels ===
- Mara Jade: By the Emperor's Hand; a graphic novel with Michael A. Stackpole (1999)
- Mara Jade: A Night on the Town, comic in Star Wars Tales 1

=== Short stories ===
- "First Contact": short story in Star Wars Adventure Journal 1, later republished in Tales from the Empire (1994)
- "Mist Encounter": short story in Star Wars Adventure Journal 7, later republished in the paperback edition of Outbound Flight (1995)
- "Hammertong": short story in Tales from the Mos Eisley Cantina (1995)
- "Sleight of Hand": short story in Tales from Jabba's Palace (1996)
- "Command Decision": short story in Star Wars Adventure Journal 11 (1996)
- "Side Trip": novella with Michael A. Stackpole in Star Wars Adventure Journal 12 and Star Wars Adventure Journal 13, later republished in Tales from the Empire (1997)
- "Jade Solitaire": short story intended for the cancelled Star Wars Adventure Journal 17, later published in Tales from the New Republic (1999)
- "Crisis of Faith": short story published in Heir to the Empire: The 20th Anniversary Edition (2011)
- "Interlude at Darkknell": novella with Michael A. Stackpole, in Tales from the New Republic (1999)
- "Fool's Bargain": eBook; also reprinted in the paperback edition of Survivor's Quest (2004)
- "Hero of Cartao": short story in Star Wars Insider (2003)
- "Changing Seasons": short story in Star Wars Insider (2004)
- "Judge's Call": short story on Del Rey's website (2004)
- "Duel": short story / Hasbro tie-in (2003)
- "Handoff": short story in Star Wars Gamer (2002)
- "The Saga Begins": short story in The Darkstryder Campaign (1995)

== Other novels ==
=== Blackcollar trilogy ===
- The Blackcollar (1983)
- The Backlash Mission (1986)
- The Judas Solution (2006)

Both The Blackcollar and The Backlash Mission were released in one joint novel titled Blackcollar in 2006.

=== Cobra series ===
The three Cobra trilogies are an ongoing series of adventure novels set in a space opera future where "Cobras", augmented supersoldiers, defend colony worlds from the overbearing Dominion of Man and from the alien Troft.

Cobra trilogy

1. Cobra (1985)
2. Cobra Strike (1986)
3. Cobra Bargain (1988)

The first two books were also released in one compilation called Cobras Two in 1992. A complete compilation was released as the Cobra Trilogy in 2004.

Cobra War trilogy

1. Cobra Alliance (2009)
2. Cobra Guardian (2011)
3. Cobra Gamble (2012)

Cobra Rebellion trilogy

1. Cobra Slave (2013)
2. Cobra Outlaw (February 2015)
3. Cobra Traitor (January 2018)

=== Conquerors' trilogy ===
The Conquerors trilogy of novels concerns a failed first contact between humans and aliens that leads to an interstellar war.

- Conquerors' Pride (1994)
- Conquerors' Heritage (1995)
- Conquerors' Legacy (1996)

=== Icarus series ===
- The Icarus Hunt (1999)
- The Icarus Plot (2022)
- The Icarus Twin (2023)
- The Icarus Job (2024)
- The Icarus Changeling (2024)
- The Icarus Needle (2024)
- The Icarus Coda (2025)

=== Manticore Ascendant ===
Co-written with David Weber and Thomas Pope, and set in the early days of Weber's Honorverse, circa 1529 to 1543 Post Diaspora. The series focuses on Travis Uriah Long of the Royal Manticoran Navy and the events leading to the discovery of the Manticore Wormhole Junction.

- A Call to Duty (2014, co-author Weber)
- A Call to Arms (2015, co-authors Weber and Pope)
- A Call to Vengeance (2018, co-authors Weber and Pope)
- A Call to Insurrection (February 1, 2022; co-authors Weber and Pope)

=== Dragonback series ===
- Dragon and Thief (2003)
- Dragon and Soldier (2004)
- Dragon and Slave (2005)
- Dragon and Herdsman (2006)
- Dragon and Judge (2007)
- Dragon and Liberator (2008)

=== Terminator Salvation ===
- Terminator Salvation: From the Ashes (2009)
- Terminator Salvation: Trial by Fire (2010)

=== Quadrail or Frank Compton series ===
- Night Train to Rigel (2005)
- The Third Lynx (2007)
- Odd Girl Out (2008)
- The Domino Pattern (2009)
- Judgment at Proteus (2012)

=== Sibyl's War series ===
- Pawn (2017)
- Knight (2019)
- Queen (2020)

=== StarCraft series ===
- StarCraft Evolution (2016)

=== Other novels ===
- A Coming of Age (1984)
- Spinneret (1985)
- Triplet (1987)
- Deadman Switch (1988)
- Warhorse (1990)
- Angelmass (2001)
- Manta's Gift (2002)
- The Green and the Gray (2004)
- Soulminder (2014)
- Cloak (2015) [re-released as Cloaked Deception (2024)]

== Comics ==
- Star-Lord #1-3 (December 1996 - February 1997)

== Short fiction ==
Collections

- Cascade Point and Other Stories (1986)
- Time Bomb and Zahndry Others (1988)
- Distant Friends and Others (1992) [expanded and re-released as Distant Telepaths (2025)]
- Star Song and Other Stories (2002)
- Pawn's Gambit: And Other Stratagems (2016)

List of stories

- "The Dreamsender" short story in Analog July 1980, later republished in Cascade Point and Other Stories (1986)
- "The Challenge" short story in Space Gamer December 1980, later republished in Cascade Point and Other Stories (1986)
- "The Energy Crisis of 2215" short story in Amazing Stories March 1981, later republished in Cascade Point and Other Stories (1986)
- "Hollow Victory" short story in Analog March 1981
- "The Giftie Gie Us" short story in Analog July 20, 1981, later republished in Cascade Point and Other Stories (1986)
- "Job Inaction" short story in Analog November 1981, later republished in Cascade Point and Other Stories (1986)
- "Dragon Pax" short story in Regal Science Fiction Fall 1982, later republished in Cascade Point and Other Stories (1986)
- "The Shadows of Evening" short story in The Magazine of Fantasy and Science Fiction March 1983, later republished in Cascade Point and Other Stories (1986)
- "The Final Report on the Lifeline Experiment" short story in Analog May 1983, later republished in Cascade Point and Other Stories (1986)
- "The Cassandra" short story in Analog November 1983, later republished in Cascade Point and Other Stories (1986)
- "Cascade Point" short story and Hugo winner in Analog December 1983, later republished in Cascade Point and Other Stories (1986)
- "Return to the Fold" short story and Hugo nominee in Analog September 1984, later republished in Cascade Point and Other Stories (1986)
- "Ernie" short story in Analog September 1979, later republished in Time Bomb and Zahndry Others (1988)
- "Reason d'Etre" short story in Analog October 1981, later republished in Time Bomb and Zahndry Others (1988)
- "The Price of Survival" short story in Analog June 22, 1981, later republished in Time Bomb and Zahndry Others (1988)
- "Houseguest" short story in The Magazine of Fantasy and Science Fiction January 1982, later republished in Time Bomb and Zahndry Others (1988)
- "Between a Rock and a High Place" short story in Analog July 1982, later republished in Time Bomb and Zahndry Others (1988)
- "The Presidents Doll" short story in Analog July 1987, later republished in Time Bomb and Zahndry Others (1988)
- "Banshee" short story in Analog September 1987, later republished in Time Bomb and Zahndry Others (1988)
- "Time Bomb" short story in New Destinies May 1988, later republished in Time Bomb and Zahndry Others (1988) and Time Traveled Tales vol 1 (2013)
- "The Peacemakers" short story in There Won't Be War (1991)
- "Red Thoughts at Morning" short story in Analog April 1981, later republished in Distant Friends and Others (1992)
- "Dark Thoughts at Noon" short story in Analog December 1982, later republished in Distant Friends and Others (1992)
- "Black Thoughts at Midnight" short story in Distant Friends and Others (1992)
- "Final Solution" short story in Analog March 1982, later republished in Distant Friends and Others (1992)
- "Pawn's Gambit" short story and Hugo nominee in Analog March 29, 1982, later republished in Distant Friends and Others (1992)
- "The Peaceful Man" short story in The Magazine of Fantasy and Science Fiction September 1982, later republished in Distant Friends and Others (1992)
- "Expanded Character" short story in Analog September 1983, later republished in Distant Friends and Others (1992)
- "The Evidence of Things Not Seen" short story in Analog June 1986, later republished in Distant Friends and Others (1992)
- "Guardian Angel" short story in Far Frontiers VII December 1986, later republished in Distant Friends and Others (1992)
- "Point Man" short story in New Destinies vol. 1 1987, later republished in Star Song and Other Stories (2002)
- "The Broccoli Factor" short story in Analog February 1990, later republished in Star Song and Other Stories (2002)
- "Hitmen - See Murderers" short story in Amazing Stories June 1991, later republished in Star Song and Other Stories (2002)
- "The Art of War" short story in The Magazine of Fantasy and Science Fiction March 1997, later republished in Star Song and Other Stories (2002)
- "The Play's the Thing" short story Analog March 1997, later republished in Star Song and Other Stories (2002)
- "Star Song" short story in Analog July/August 1997, later republished in Star Song and Other Stories (2002)
- "Sword's Man": short story in The Space Gamer
- "Symmkyn's Edge": short story in The Space Gamer
- "Vampire Trap": short story in The Space Gamer
- "Fantasy World": short story in The Space Gamer
- "When Jonny Comes Marching Home" short story (1982) (This was expanded into the first book in the Cobra series)
- "Return to the Fold" short story and Hugo nominee (1984)
- "Teamwork" short story (1984)
- "Music Hath Charms" short story in Analog, April 1985
- "Clean Slate" short story in Amazing Stories, January 1989
- "Protocol" short story in Analog, September 2002
- "Old-Boy Network" short story in Sol's Children, August 2002
- "Proof" short story in Amazing Stories, September 2004
- "The Ring" short story in Pandora's Closet (DAW Books), August 2007
- "Trollbridge" short story in Spells of the City (DAW Books), December 2009
- "With One Stone": Honorverse short story in The Service of the Sword (2003)
- "Vampin' Down the Avenue" short story in Twilight Zone: 19 Original Stories on the 50th Anniversary (2009)
- "A Matter of Trust" short story eBook for Heroes Reborn, November 2015
- "Ghost Riders in the Sky" (2020)

== Others ==
- Ahsoka (2023) Creative consultant

== Critical studies and reviews of Zahn's work ==
Soulminder

- Sakers, Don (April 2015). "The Reference Library". Analog Science Fiction and Fact. 135 (4): 104–107.
