= Thrawn (disambiguation) =

Grand Admiral Thrawn is a character who appears in Star Wars media.

Thrawn may also refer to the title of several Star Wars novels featuring the character:

- The Thrawn trilogy (1991–1993) by Timothy Zahn, also known as the Heir to the Empire trilogy
- The 2010s Thrawn trilogy by Zahn, comprising
  - Star Wars: Thrawn (2017)
  - Thrawn: Alliances (2018)
  - Thrawn: Treason (2019)
- The Thrawn Ascendancy trilogy (2020–2021) by Zahn, also known as Thrawn: The Ascendancy Trilogy or The Ascendancy Trilogy
  - Thrawn Ascendancy: Chaos Rising (2020)
  - Thrawn Ascendancy: Greater Good (2021)
  - Thrawn Ascendancy: Lesser Evil (2021)
