= Chaos Rising =

Chaos Rising may refer to:

- Warhammer 40,000: Dawn of War II – Chaos Rising, real-time strategy video game
- Star Wars: Thrawn Ascendancy: Chaos Rising, the first in the Thrawn: Ascendancy trilogy
- "Chaos Rising", a song of Cirith Ungol from the album Paradise Lost
