= Elom =

The name Elorm or Elom may refer to:

- Elorm, a traditional name belonging to the Ewe people meaning "God loves me" or "beloved by God".
- Elom (fictional race), a fictional alien race in the Star Wars franchise
  - Elom (Star Wars), the planet from which they originate
