= Dragon and Thief =

2003 novel by Timothy Zahn

- First edition
- Author: Timothy Zahn
- Cover artist: Jon Foster
- Language: English
- Series: Dragonback series
- Genre: Young adult fiction
- Publisher: Tor Books
- Publication date: February 2003
- Publication place: United States
- Media type: Print (hardback & paperback)
- Pages: 256
- ISBN: 0-7653-4272-3
- Followed by: Dragon and Soldier (2004)

Dragon and Thief is a science fiction/adventure novel published in 2003 by Timothy Zahn. It is the first of a six-part series, concluded in 2008, following the adventures of a reformed juvenile thief alongside a draconoid 'symbiont'.

== Characters ==
Jack Morgan is a fourteen-year-old boy, raised by his adoptive uncle, Virgil Morgan, as a professional thief and confidence artist but presently interested in reform. Throughout the first book, he lives aboard the starship Essenay, protected by an artificial intelligence mimicking his uncle.

Draycos is a 'k'da': a pseudo-reptile resembling a wingless dragon, requiring periodic physical contact with an anthropoid host to retain existence, and in return serving the host as bodyguard. Deprived of his customary host in battle, he befriends Jack Morgan to identify his attackers.

Virgil Morgan, the adoptive uncle of Jack, is a professional thief and confidence artist, notorious throughout the Orion Arm, and therefore sought as an ally by the story's antagonists; but has died before the events of the initial book, and is represented largely in Jack's memories. Because his death is kept secret by Jack, he is believed alive by supporting characters until the final book.

Uncle Virge is the artificial intelligence guiding the starship Essenay. Being created to mimic the late Virgil, he is the reader's chief source of information upon the latter, and serves as devil's advocate in any discussion by Jack, Draycos, and himself of future plans.

Arthur Neverlin is the chairman of the board of Braxton Universis, an interstellar megacorporation, who arranges to frame Jack Morgan for theft, and later murder, in order to interest Virgil Morgan in Neverlin's own feud with Cornelius Braxton, his superior.

Lieutenant Raven is Neverlin's subordinate, who frames Jack for theft by planting dry ice in place of cargo, and later for murder by killing two noncombatants. Himself killed by Draycos.

Drabs is Raven's subordinate.

Cornelius Braxton is the founder and CEO of Braxton Universis; nearly assassinated by Neverlin, but saved by Jack and Draycos.

Harper is Braxton's bodyguard and gatekeeper.

Polphir is Draycos' former host, who dies in battle. He is Shontine, a race similar to humans.

== Plot ==
After two years in space, the two species Shontine and K'da reach Iota Klestis, the world they have bought to flee from their enemies, the Valaghua; but are attacked by mercenary starships using the Valaghua's weapon, known as the Death. Of the crew, only Draycos survives; later to acquire Jack as host. They are twice attacked by human soldiers, of whom they imprison one and render the other senseless; but prevent the second from probable death. In leaving Iota Klestis, they are attacked by two other spacecraft, but escape when Draycos frightens these into collision. Thereafter Draycos explains that he is part of an 'advance team' of refugees fleeing the Valaghua, and must now discover who revealed their arrival to enemies. Because Jack is in danger of arrest for a theft he did not commit, they travel to the planet Vagran, to clear his name. There, Jack deduces that the stolen cargo consisted solely of dry ice, and was entrusted to him to ensure his blame for disappearance of a non-extant machine. Pursued by Drabs and Raven, they conceal themselves among the local 'Wistawki', masquerading as entertainers at a wedding party. Upon leaving this, they are ambushed by Lieutenant Raven and two other soldiers, who frame Jack for murder by killing two Wistawki, then transfer him unconscious to the spacecraft Advocatus Diaboli. Here, Jack is assigned by Neverlin to exchange a genetic sample for an unidentified poison, aboard the spaceborne luxury liner Star of Wonder. Having obtained the original device, Jack and Draycos offer it directly to the owner (identified belatedly as Cornelius Braxton), only to be captured at once by Raven and his subordinates Vance and Meyers. These then transfer Braxton, Jack, and the concealed Draycos to a cargo bay, intending to suffocate them in an airlock; but Vance and Meyers are struck senseless by Draycos, and Raven killed. Cornelius Braxton then clears Jack's name of criminal charges; but after Jack leaves, orders an investigation of Jack and his uncle, and of the mark made by Draycos to distinguish the true genetic sample from the false.

=== Publication history ===
2003, United States, Tor, Pub date February 2003, Hardback and Softcover

=== Sequels ===
This book is the first of six, whereof the titles combine the phrase 'Dragon and[...]' with the name of Jack's temporary vocation. The second of the series is Dragon and Soldier; the third Dragon and Slave, etc.

== Awards and nominations ==
- American Library Association: Best Library Book for Young Adults

== Reception ==
- Publishers Weekly says "Zahn keeps the story moving at a breakneck pace, maintaining excitement even when the plot becomes clichéd."
- Kirkus Reviews calls it "A palatable adventure for a young audience, well paced and smoothly narrated."
