= Dragon and Soldier =

2004 novel by Timothy Zahn

- First edition
- Author: Timothy Zahn
- Cover artist: Jon Foster
- Language: English
- Series: Dragonback series
- Genre: Sci-fi
- Published: 2004, Starscape
- Publication place: United States
- Media type: Print
- Pages: 304 pages
- ISBN: 0765301253
- Preceded by: Dragon and Thief
- Followed by: Dragon and Slave

Dragon and Soldier is a 2004 science fiction novel by Timothy Zahn and the second book in his Dragonback series. It was preceded by 2003's Dragon and Thief and was followed by Dragon and Slave. It was first published on June 1, 2004 by Starscape and is set on two Earth-like planets and an intelligent spacecraft. It follows the human Jack Morgan and his dragon-esque partner Draycos as they set off on an unsuccessful investigation.

== Plot ==
To identify which, among the various mercenary armies operating in the Orion Arm, coöperated with Draycos' most-recent attackers, Jack enlists in the mercenary force 'Whinyard's Edge', to investigate whether they, or any of their rivals, were participants in the ambush; but when Jack's burglary of their records is interrupted by that of fellow-recruit 'Alison Kayna', both burglars, and their four closest acquaintances among the new recruits, are betrayed by their officers to the rival organization 'Shamshir'. Having escaped, and later rescued Jack's comrades, Jack and Draycos feign destruction of the mine for which both organizations are fighting, whereupon the organizations abandon the mine to local claimants. Thereafter Jack plans to investigate the slave-trade supplying all the mercenary societies with 'Brummgas' (a troll-like species), in hope of there finding the desired information. In the epilogue, Alison Kayna investigates Jack's possessions; but the results are unseen until the sixth book of the series, Dragon and Liberator.

== Reception ==
This second novel in the series received generally positive reviews. The introduction of a new lead character, Alison, a girl about Jack's age, provides scope for additional character development.
