= Outbound Flight =

Star Wars Expanded Universe book

- Author: Timothy Zahn
- Cover artist: Dave Seeley
- Language: English
- Series: Star Wars
- Genre: Science fiction
- Publisher: Del Rey
- Publication date: January 31, 2006
- Publication place: United States
- Media type: Hardcover & Paperback
- Pages: 464
- ISBN: 9780345456830
- Preceded by: Jedi Quest: The Way of the Apprentice
- Followed by: Jedi Quest: The Trail of the Jedi

Outbound Flight is a novel set in the Star Wars expanded universe, published by Del Rey on January 31, 2006. Written by Timothy Zahn, it is a prequel to Zahn's 2004 novel, Survivor's Quest.

== Setting ==
Outbound Flight is set in 27 BBY, five years after The Phantom Menace and 49 years before the events of Survivor's Quest.

== Plot ==
The Bargain Hunter, a smuggling ship on the run from pirates, flees into the Unknown Regions. Before the confrontation can continue, a flotilla of unknown ships arrive, and defeat the much better armed pirates. The crew of the Bargain Hunter is then invited onto the flotilla's flagship, where they meet Force Commander Mitth'raw'nuruodo of the alien Chiss Expansionary fleet.

Commander Mitth'raw'nuruodo speaks with the navigator of the Bargain Hunter, a young human named Jorj Car'das. He offers to repair damages to the ship, and to provide them with additional goods, so long as the crew stay a few months with the Chiss fleet in order to teach their language. Car'das agrees, provided he can also learn the Chiss language in return.

Meanwhile, in Coruscant, Jedi Master Jorus C'Baoth and his Padawan, Lorana Jinzler, struggle to obtain funding for the Outbound Flight Project: a mission to leave the galaxy and establish colonies in the neighboring areas. They are told by Chancellor Palpatine and his aide, Kinman Doriana, that funding might come through if they mediate a mining strike on the planet Barlok. C'Baoth and Jinzler head to Barlok, accompanied by Obi-Wan Kenobi and Anakin Skywalker, who were assigned by the Jedi Council to keep an eye on them.

In the Unknown Regions, Commander Mitth'raw'nuruodo—who has allowed Car'das to call him by his core name, "Thrawn,"—enters a skirmish with the Vagaari, a nomadic group of slavers and pirates. Thrawn is injured, though his force wins the battle. Upon his return, Car'das and the rest of the Bargain Hunter crew must contend with Mitth'ras'safis, or "Thrass," a politician and Thrawn's brother, who resents the free reign the smugglers have been given, as well as Thrawn's disrespect for the Chiss doctrine against preliminary attacks.

On Barlok, Lorana, Obi-Wan, and Anakin discover a plot to bomb the negotiators, though they are unable to prevent it. The saboteurs launch a missile at the negotiating site, but C'Baoth stops it with the Force, and uses the moment to resolve all disputes. C'Baoth uses this political goodwill to gain funds for Outbound Flight, and it is revealed that Doriana—who serves not only Palpatine, but Darth Sidious—masterminded the saboteurs in order to create a grand win for C'Baoth to gain his funding. Sidious believes Outbound Flight is the perfect opportunity to wipe out a large amount of Jedi without arousing suspicion. Outbound Flight leaves, carrying 6 Jedi Masters, 12 Jedi Knights, and hundreds of crew and their families.

Doriana is assigned by Sidious to destroy Outbound Flight, and is given a battle fleet to do so. This fleet waits at the edge of the Unknown Regions, where they are discovered by Commander Thrawn. Though Thrawn has a much smaller force, he destroys the fleet with superior tactics. Doriana pivots to an attempt to recruit Thrawn. He tells Thrawn of dangerous species outside of the known galaxy, which Outbound Flight might anger into invasion, and begs Thrawn to destroy Outbound Flight. Thrawn agrees to do so.

Car'das escapes the Chiss, increasingly alarmed by Thrawn's actions, and goes to the Vagaari in an attempt to bargain for his and the crew's freedom. The Vagaari agree to attack the battle fleet, though they keep Car'das as a hostage.

Outbound Flight is confronted by Thrawn, who offers them a chance to turn back. C'Baoth refuses. The Vagaari arrive, and hostilities ensue. C'Baoth begins to Force choke Thrawn and, in response, Doriana activates a backup measure Thrawn instituted, which bombards the entire Outbound Flight, killing almost all of its passengers. Thrawn, recovered, forces the Vagaari to retreat, while Car'das manages to escape.

It is revealed that Car'das had been working with Thrawn, luring the Vagaari into battle to allow Thrawn to defeat them without breaking the Chiss doctrine against preemptive strikes. Thrass and Car'das enter the ruins of Outbound Flight, and discover survivors: Lorana Jinzler, along with several families.

Thrass and Lorana decide to move Outbound Flight to a remote location in order to prevent its seizure by Chiss forces without harming the survivors. Car'das is sent back to Thrawn to update him on this development. Lorana and Thrass move the ship, but it has sustained too much damage and crashes, killing them both but leaving the families alive and stranded.

Thrawn allows Car'das and the Bargain Hunter to return to the Republic. Doriana offers Car'das a job, and promises Thrawn that he and his master will be in touch.

== Development ==
The fate of the Outbound Flight project was initially described in Timothy Zahn's Thrawn trilogy. The idea to make it a full novel came from Lucasfilm, where executive editor Sue Rostoni approached Zahn's editor to see if he had any interest in expanding the story into a novel. It was initially not linked to Survivor's Quest, though as Zahn began working on Survivor's Quest, he realized that he could "pull the same trick George Lucas himself was doing, prequel-wise, and have Survivor's Quest tell the end of the Outbound Flight story before the readers actually got to see the beginning."

== Reception ==
The book was generally well received. Publishers Weekly wrote: "Though more time with the doomed Outbound Flight's passengers, who are the subject of Survivor's Quest, would round out the story, the book is nonetheless an enthralling page-turner sure to appeal to its target audience."

The novel reached number seven on The New York Times Bestsellers List.
