= Grand Admiral Thrawn =

Star Wars character

Mitth'raw'nuruodo; Grand Admiral Thrawn
- Star Wars character
- Thrawn from the Star Wars Miniatures game Imperial Entanglements expansion pack packaging (2009)
- First appearance: Heir to the Empire (1991)
- Created by: Timothy Zahn
- Portrayed by: Lars Mikkelsen (Ahsoka)
- Voiced by: Marc Thompson (Thrawn novels, audiobooks); Tris King (TIE Fighter); Tim Russell (Dark Forces: Soldier for the Empire, audio drama); Robin Atkin Downes (Empire at War: Forces of Corruption); Lars Mikkelsen (Rebels, Tales of the Empire)

In-universe information
- Full name: Mitth'raw'nuruodo; Kivu'raw'nuru (birth name)
- Nicknames: Thrawn; Vurawn
- Species: Chiss
- Gender: Male
- Titles: Grand Admiral of the Imperial Navy; Agent of the Chiss Ascendancy; Senior Captain
- Occupation: Grand Admiral; Admiral; Commodore; Commander of the Seventh Fleet
- Affiliation: Chiss Ascendancy; Galactic Empire; Shadow Council; Empire of the Hand (Legends)
- Relatives: Mitth'ras'safis "Thrass" (brother); Cohbo'rik'ardok (sister)
- Homeworld: Rentor (Canon); Csilla (Legends)

Grand Admiral Thrawn (full name: Mitth'raw'nuruodo; born: Kivu'raw'nuru) is a fictional character in the Star Wars franchise. He first appeared in what came to be known as the Thrawn trilogy of novels (1991–1993) by Timothy Zahn. An Imperial military leader and a member of the Chiss race, Thrawn leads remnants of the scattered Galactic Empire in the aftermath of its fall.

In the Thrawn trilogy, Thrawn returns from the unknown regions and leads Imperial remnants in a campaign against the New Republic, facing off against classic Star Wars characters Luke Skywalker, Princess Leia, Han Solo, Chewbacca, and Lando Calrissian, before seemingly being resurrected in the Hand of Thrawn duology (1997–1998), with his backstory explored in various other novels, short stories, comics, and video games in the Star Wars expanded universe. In 2014, these stories were rebranded as Star Wars Legends by Lucasfilm and rendered non-canon.

Thrawn reentered official canon in the 3D animated TV series Star Wars Rebels from 2016 to 2018, voiced by Lars Mikkelsen. Zahn published a new Thrawn trilogy (2017–2019) and then the Thrawn Ascendancy trilogy (2020–2021), reinventing Thrawn as an anti-villain and double agent who infiltrates the Empire's ranks on behalf of his own people and the galactic government of the Unknown Regions, the Chiss Ascendancy. He intends to use Imperial resources to engage in open warfare with the extragalactic fanatics, the Grysk, before they can invade the galaxy, in the meantime opposing the Rebel Alliance on Palpatine's behalf before being forcibly sent to another galaxy by and alongside Ezra Bridger. Thrawn made his live-action debut in the Disney+ series Ahsoka (2023), with Mikkelsen reprising his role. Mikkelsen later reprised the voice role in the animated anthology series Tales of the Empire (2024).

Thrawn has been called one of the most significant and popular characters in the Legends continuity. Several Star Wars action figures and other merchandise have been produced of the character.

== Character ==
Thrawn first appeared in the 1991 Timothy Zahn novel Heir to the Empire, the first installment of what became known as the first Thrawn trilogy. He is a Grand Admiral in the Imperial Navy, and categorically "the most brilliant of the Emperor's minions". A member of the alien Chiss species, native language Cheunh, Thrawn is described as a tall, solidly built humanoid with blue skin and glowing red eyes who wears the white uniform befitting his rank. He has risen in power thanks to his "tactical brilliance and cunning", and has been described as "one of the most threatening antagonists" in the Star Wars universe. He is an unparalleled military strategist and tactical genius who has made extensive study of military intelligence and the artwork of other cultures, and the Thrawn trilogy finds him commanding the remnants of the Imperial Fleet in a series of stunning victories against the New Republic. His full name was given as Mitth'raw'nuruodo.

IGN described the character as "diabolical, brilliant and ruthless". Zahn describes Thrawn's command style as considerably different from that of Darth Vader and other typical Imperial commanders; instead of punishing failure and dissent, Thrawn promotes creativity among his crew and accepts ideas from subordinates. Zahn said in 2017:

Most of the Imperial leaders we see in the movies rule through a combination of fear and manipulation. I wanted to create something different: a commander who could lead through loyalty. The result was Thrawn, a tactical genius whose troops follow him willingly, and who will fight for him whether or not he's watching over their shoulders.

Referencing Zahn's annotations in the 20th Anniversary Edition of Heir to the Empire, John Booth wrote in Wired that Zahn "created and developed Thrawn as a character [by] deliberately establishing the Grand Admiral as a villain who leads not by coercion and fear but through valuing strategy and loyalty". Zahn explained in 2008 that Thrawn's version of the Empire is different from that of Palpatine because Thrawn does not have Palpatine's megalomania and xenophobia. Calling Thrawn and Mara Jade his favorite of the characters he created, Zahn noted in 2006 that writing the Grand Admiral "provides the intellectual challenge of trying to come up with new, clever, and (hopefully) workable tactics and strategies." Zahn has also stated that Thrawn's entire motivation, both serving in the Empire and the Ascendancy, is to protect the Chiss people and "everything else flows from that."

=== Portrayal ===
Thrawn is voiced by Tris King in the 1994 computer game Star Wars: TIE Fighter, and by Tim Russell in the 1997 audio drama Dark Forces: Soldier for the Empire. In seasons three and four of Star Wars Rebels, Thrawn is voiced by Lars Mikkelsen. Mikkelsen reprised his role as Thrawn from Rebels in live-action in the 2023 Disney+ series Ahsoka.

== Appearances ==
=== Legends works ===
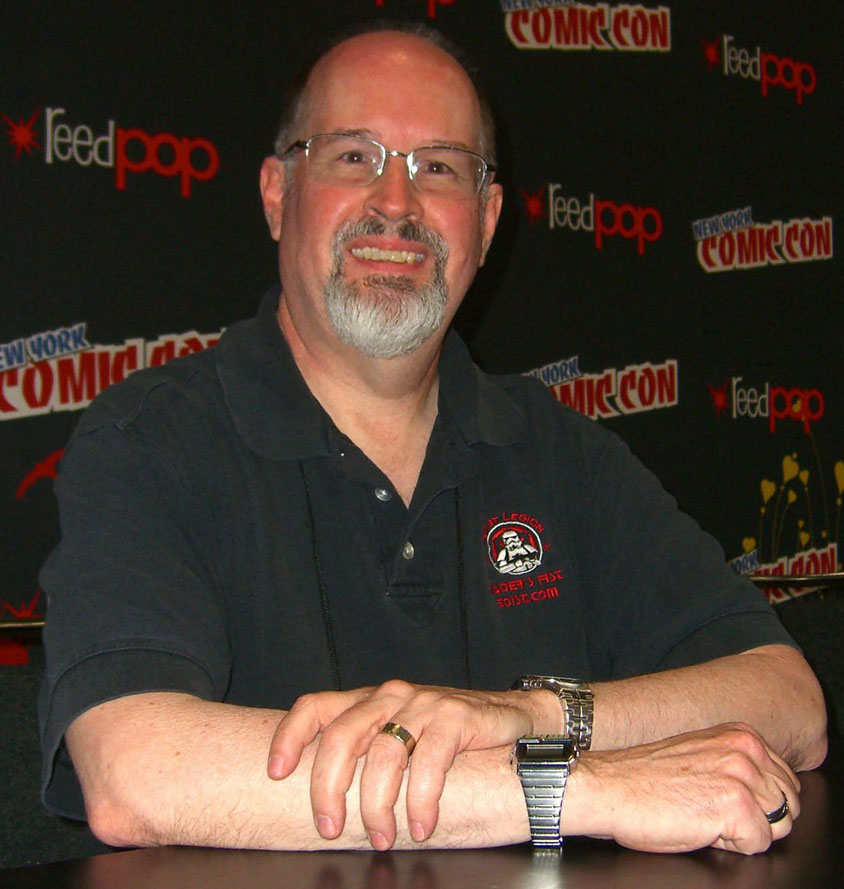
Timothy Zahn in 2012

According to Zahn, Lou Aronica of Bantam Spectra had negotiated a book deal with Lucasfilm in 1989, and the publisher put Zahn's name at the top of their list of possible authors. He said, "My original instructions from LucasArts [sic] consisted of exactly two rules: the books were to start 3–5 years after Return of the Jedi, and I couldn't use anyone who'd been explicitly killed off in the movies." Zahn used information from the original film trilogy as his primary source, but supplemented that with details from the many sourcebooks created for West End Games' Star Wars: The Roleplaying Game, saying that they "saved me from having to reinvent the wheel many times". (Note: Zahn noted that he invented the concept that a lightsaber could be locked on.) In turn, each novel in the trilogy had its role-playing game sourcebook created for it by West End Games. (Note: When the rules for the Star Wars RPG changed the three volumes were collected into one book for the entire Thrawn trilogy, which also served as a second edition to the original three sourcebooks.)

Introduced in the Thrawn trilogy (1991–1993), Thrawn became a fan favorite and subsequently appeared in multiple works in what became known as the Star Wars Expanded Universe, including novels, comics and video games, through 2006. He is often cited as one of the most popular characters in the franchise. Star Wars Rebels executive producer Dave Filoni said of the character in 2016, "You couldn't have grown up a Star Wars fan without encountering Thrawn in Heir to the Empire. It was a dark time when there weren't any more movies, and it blew our minds that there could be more." The Thrawn trilogy itself is widely credited with reviving interest in the Star Wars franchise. In 2010, Star Wars: The Clone Wars creator Filoni expressed interest in using Thrawn in that series. Some fans of Zahn's Thrawn series had long hoped the books would be adapted, and after the 2012 announcement that The Walt Disney Company had acquired Lucasfilm and planned to produce film sequels to Return of the Jedi, Zahn commented that if material from the expanded universe were used in the films, "we'd all be thrilled to death".

With the 2012 acquisition of Lucasfilm by Disney, most of the licensed Star Wars novels and comics produced since the originating 1977 film Star Wars were rebranded as Star Wars Legends and declared non-canon to the franchise in April 2014. Though Lucasfilm made it clear that new media would "not tell the same story told in the post-Return of the Jedi Expanded Universe", it was also established that "creators of new Star Wars entertainment have full access to the rich content of the Expanded Universe." Acknowledging that Thrawn had long been considered by Lucasfilm when developing projects, Filoni later said in 2016 that in particular the character had been on his list of potential villains when developing Star Wars Rebels.

==== Thrawn trilogy (1991–1993) ====
The Thrawn trilogy, also known as the Heir to the Empire trilogy, was written by Timothy Zahn between 1991 and 1993. Approximately five years after the events depicted in Return of the Jedi, the Rebel Alliance, now known as the New Republic, has driven out the remnants of the old Imperial Starfleet to a distant corner of the galaxy and is attempting to set up a functional government. Princess Leia and Han Solo are married and expecting twins. Luke Skywalker has become the first in a long-awaited new line of Jedi Knights. Thousands of light years away, Grand Admiral Thrawn, the last and most brilliant of the 12 grand admirals, has taken command of the shattered Imperial Fleet and prepared it to attack the New Republic. Thrawn is searching for a Dark Jedi to join his side and is confident he can restore the Empire.

In Heir to the Empire (1991), (Note: Zahn's working title for the book was Wild Card, which Bantam vetoed because of its similarity to their other series, Wild Cards. Bantam also rejected his second favorite title, The Emperor's Hand. Warlord's Gambit was also a potential title, but ultimately Heir to the Empire was chosen, which according to Zahn was suggested by Aronica.) Thrawn plots to destroy the New Republic despite their numerical advantage over the remaining Imperial forces. He sets his sights on the Wayland storehouse of the late Emperor Palpatine, which contains a massive array of Spaarti cloning cylinders and a practical cloaking shield. To this end, Thrawn and his subordinate Gilad Pellaeon, captain of the Star Destroyer Chimaera, enlist the help of smuggler Talon Karrde and his second-in-command Mara Jade to obtain several salamander-like creatures called ysalamiri. Thrawn uses the ysalamiri, which possess the natural ability to disrupt the Force, to subdue the storehouse's guardian Joruus C'baoth, a twisted clone of a Jedi Master whom the Grand Admiral had killed years before. C'baoth offers his allegiance in exchange for two acolytes to bend to his will: Darth Vader's twin children, Luke and Leia. Thrawn sends some of his Noghri killers to capture Luke and a pregnant Leia, but their attempts repeatedly fail. Leia defends herself from one attack and is surprised when the Noghri suddenly surrenders. Thrawn launches his first offensive, a series of hit-and-run attacks into New Republic territory, and then steals a complement of mole miners from Lando Calrissian's mining operations on Nkllon. In need of warships, and with his previous tactics having forced over 100 lightly crewed ships to be stationed at the Sluis Van shipyards as he planned, Thrawn invades. His stormtroopers use the stolen miners to board and hijack the ships, but they are thwarted when Lando seizes control of the miners remotely. The Grand Admiral withdraws his forces, but thanks to Thrawn's plotting, his New Republic nemesis Admiral Ackbar is soon arrested for treason.

Dark Force Rising (1992) reveals that before the Clone Wars, the Old Republic had constructed a fleet of highly automated heavy cruisers, known as the Katana fleet. A virus infected the crews of the entire fleet and drove them insane. The fleet was not seen again until smuggler Talon Karrde discovered it (several years before the events of the first book). With access to Palpatine's private storehouse on the planet Wayland, Thrawn presses his advantage to marshal more forces for the battle against the New Republic. Mara Jade, in an attempt to exonerate the Empire's warrant for Karrde's arrest, goes to Thrawn and offers to reveal the location of the Katana fleet. Instead, he has her followed and Karrde is captured. Luke and Mara rescue Karrde from Thrawn's Star Destroyer as Thrawn attempts to capture another man who knows about the Katana fleet. Meanwhile, Leia learns that the Noghri serve the Empire because they revere her late father, Darth Vader, who they believe saved their planet Honoghr from ecological disaster. Leia convinces them that they have been deceived and effectively enslaved by the Empire, and they switch sides. With Ackbar temporarily neutralized as a tactical opponent, Thrawn leads an army of clones to claim the so-called "Katana fleet", outmaneuvering Luke, Lando, and Han Solo.

In The Last Command (1993), set about a month after the previous book, Thrawn uses the Katana fleet, crewed with clones, to mount a successful offensive against the New Republic. Seizing one planet after the other, the Grand Admiral soon immobilizes the galactic capital world, Coruscant. He has placed multiple cloaked asteroids around the planet, and through a ruse, he has led the New Republic leadership to believe that Coruscant is surrounded with them. Learning of the deception, the Republic fleet attacks the Imperial shipyards at Bilbringi to capture a device that can find the cloaked asteroids, but Thrawn's forces intercept and surround them. Meanwhile, Luke and Leia lead a group to destroy the cloning facility on Wayland, killing C'baoth and destroying the cloning cylinders. Just as Thrawn and Pellaeon learn that the Noghri aided in the attack on Wayland, Thrawn's Noghri bodyguard, Rukh, kills the Grand Admiral—whose last words are, "But ... it was so artistically done." The tide of battle at Bilbringi turns, and with the hope of victory dashed by Thrawn's death, Pellaeon orders the Imperial forces to retreat.

==== The Hand of Thrawn duology (1997–1998) ====
Zahn's Specter of the Past (1997) finds Thrawn seemingly resurrected ten years after his death when he reappears to lead the decimated Imperial forces against the unstable New Republic. A record surfaces called the Caamasi Document, which indicates that a small group of Bothans were perpetrators in the tragic destruction of the planet Caamas and causes more than a hundred alien warships to gather in orbit over the Bothans' homeworld, which the Empire hopes to use to its benefit.

In Vision of the Future (1998), Admiral Gilad Pellaeon admits that the Empire, down to only a few sectors, is now fighting a losing battle, and initiates peace talks with Princess Leia. However, Moff Disra hires a con artist, Flim, to impersonate the deceased Grand Admiral Thrawn to motivate the Imperial forces. Major Grodin Tierce, the clone of a former stormtrooper imbued with Thrawn's tactical intellect by the grand admiral himself, strategizes that the false Thrawn could also rally support for the Empire and intimidate the New Republic. The tactic is successful until Pellaeon and Talon Karrde—on opposing sides but both desiring peace—expose Flim. Meanwhile, at a fortress called the Hand of Thrawn, Luke and Mara discover a gestating and near-complete clone of Thrawn, which is killed during their escape. An expedition by Thrawn to the galaxy's Unknown Regions is also mentioned. Finally, a peace treaty is signed by Pellaeon and the New Republic's president.

==== Other works ====
===== Novels =====
Thrawn appears as a captain in the 1997 William C. Dietz novella Dark Forces: Soldier for the Empire. A younger Thrawn, ranked Captain, makes a cameo appearance in the 1998 young reader's book Galaxy of Fear: The Swarm by John Whitman, set between A New Hope and The Empire Strikes Back. In the novel, Tash and Zack Arranda and their uncle Hoole, natives of Alderaan who are fugitives from the Empire, have a chance encounter with Thrawn on the planet of the S'krrr species. Though suspicious, Thrawn is cordial and later reluctantly aids them in stopping the drog beetles from overrunning the planet.

Before the theatrical release of Attack of the Clones, Lucasfilm suggested that Zahn write a prequel-era book. (Note: Outbound Flight was initially scheduled to be published in 2002, and subsequently rescheduled for November 2005, and then January 2006.) Zahn decided to have his 2004 novel Survivor's Quest (the sequel to The Hand of Thrawn duology) cover the end of the Outbound Flight story arc before exploring its beginning in his prequel novel. (Note: Zahn said in 2006 that the idea for the expedition known as Outbound Flight "began life basically as a throwaway line". He explained: It was a way to confirm for the readers in Heir to the Empire that Joruus C'baoth was indeed a clone and not the original Jorus, as well as to provide another reference to Grand Admiral Thrawn's military skills. It also seemed like something Palpatine might reasonably have done: create something else to distract the Jedi and perhaps prune away some of the troublemakers in advance of his full extermination scheme.) In Survivor's Quest, Luke and Mara journey to investigate the wreckage of Outbound Flight, a Jedi expedition destroyed by Thrawn years before. Newly discovered by the Chiss, the remains turn out to be the lure in a trap laid by the bloodthirsty Vagaari to avenge themselves on the Chiss.

Zahn's 2006 novel Outbound Flight is set fifty years before Survivor's Quest. (Note: Or five years after the events of Star Wars: Episode I – The Phantom Menace (1999)) It follows the story of the doomed titular expedition, led by Jedi Master Jorus C'baoth, that is attacked by a young Chiss commander named Mitth'raw'nuruodo—informally known as Thrawn. In the story, a Republic fleet comes across the Chiss for the first time. The alien commander, Thrawn, can handily defeat the Republic ships despite inferior weapons and numbers. Darth Sidious, Palpatine's alter-ego, seeks to destroy the Outbound Flight, and he and his agent Kinman Doriana convince Thrawn that the ship and its Jedi pose a threat to the peaceful future of the galaxy. Thrawn agrees, hoping to get C'baoth to turn back before taking more drastic action. The Jedi refuses and Thrawn fires on the ship, but Doriana launches an assault that kills every Jedi and sends the Outbound Flight careening to its destruction on a nearby planet. Thrawn's brother Thrass and Lorana, the sole surviving Jedi, sacrifice their lives to save what survivors they can. Thrawn is reprimanded by his Chiss superiors for his hostile behavior, and summoned back to his home planet Csilla. Publishers Weekly called Thrawn the "true star" of the novel, noting that his attack on the ship, secretly influenced by Palpatine's agents, "insures his own eventual exile from his race and sets other sinister wheels in motion". Zahn said of writing the novel, "as always, it was immensely fun to play tactics with Thrawn". Though StarWars.com suggests that in Outbound Flight, Thrawn is "too smart and basically decent to become the servant of Palpatine that he later becomes", Zahn explains:

My sense has always been that [Thrawn] was manipulating Palpatine just as much as Palpatine is manipulating him. After all, he only came to the Empire so that he could gain command rank, collect all the military hardware Palpatine was willing to give him, and then get himself kicked back out to the Unknown Regions.

Set between Star Wars: A New Hope and The Empire Strikes Back, Zahn's Choices of One (2011) pits Thrawn against the alien warlord Nuso Esva, his nemesis from the Unknown Regions.

===== Short stories =====
Thrawn, exiled by the Chiss to an inhospitable planet, is found by the Imperial Captain Voss Parck in "Mist Encounter" a short story by Zahn that was originally published in Star Wars Adventure Journal #7 (August 1995). Parck realizes Thrawn's value as a strategist and decides to bring him to the Emperor. An edited version of the story was published in the paperback edition of Outbound Flight. In "Command Decision", a November 1996 short story by Zahn published in Star Wars Adventure Journal #11, Thrawn is an admiral in the Imperial Navy with Parck as his subordinate. Thrawn orchestrates a plan to locate a Rebel base in "Side Trip" by Zahn and Michael A. Stackpole, published in Star Wars Adventure Journal #12 (February 1997) and #13 (May 1997), and reprinted in the November 1997 anthology Tales from the Empire. The success of this mission earns him the command of Darth Vader's Noghri commandos. Zahn's novella Crisis of Faith, published with the 20th Anniversary Edition of Heir to the Empire on September 6, 2011, is set immediately before Heir to the Empire and finds Thrawn finally able to defeat Nuso Esva.

===== Comics =====
Thrawn trilogy comic adaptations
Star Wars: Heir to the Empire #1–6	October 1995–April 1996
Star Wars: Dark Force Rising #1–6	May–October 1997
Star Wars: The Last Command #1–6	November 1997–July 1998

Trade paperbacks:

- Heir to the Empire (collects Star Wars: Heir to the Empire #1–6, 160 pages, September 1996, ISBN 1-56971-202-6)
- Dark Force Rising (collects Star Wars: Dark Force Rising #1–6, 160 pages, February 1998, ISBN 1-56971-269-7)
- The Last Command (collects Star Wars: The Last Command #1–6, 144 pages, June 1999, ISBN 1-56971-378-2)
- The Thrawn Trilogy (collects Star Wars: Heir to the Empire #1–6, Star Wars: Dark Force Rising #1–6, and Star Wars: The Last Command #1–6, 420 pages, December 2009, ISBN 1-59582-417-0)

In the 1997 Dark Horse comic Star Wars: X-wing – Rogue Squadron 25: The Making of Baron Fel, set four years after A New Hope, Imperial pilot Soontir Fel participates in an ambush on a Rebel convoy. He realizes that the operation was planned by the "alien Admiral" Thrawn, who is given no acknowledgement by Vader or the Emperor. Fel understands that such reliance on an alien undercuts the xenophobic foundation of the Empire, and Thrawn goes unrewarded after the successful mission.

===== Video games =====
In the "Tour of Duty III" segment of the 1994 space flight simulator/combat computer game Star Wars: TIE Fighter, then-Vice Admiral Thrawn establishes order in a "wild" system at the frontiers of the Empire. The game expansion packs Defender of the Empire and Enemies of the Empire follow the story of how Thrawn thwarts the efforts of the traitorous Grand Admiral Zaarin to depose the Emperor, and Thrawn is promoted to Grand Admiral in his place. Thrawn is also a recruitable character for The Empire in the 1998 strategy computer game Star Wars: Rebellion, and later appears in Forces of Corruption expansion pack for the 2006 real-time strategy game Star Wars: Empire at War. Thrawn cameos in Star Wars Battlefront: Renegade Squadron as a "Leader" character for the Galactic Empire in Galactic Conquest, earned by conquering all planets in the Northern Quadrant of the map and allows an army to move twice in one turn if the first move is begun within said quadrant. This power is shared with Admiral Ackbar for the Rebel Alliance. He is also a collectible character in the 2015 mobile collectible Role-playing video game, Galaxy of Heroes, and a DLC character in Lego Star Wars: The Skywalker Saga.

=== Canon works ===
==== Star Wars Rebels (2016–2018) ====
Thrawn as he appears in Star Wars Rebels

In April 2014, with the sequel film Star Wars: The Force Awakens in production, most of the licensed Star Wars novels and comics produced since the 1977 film Star Wars were declared non-canon to the franchise. However, Star Wars Rebels executive producer Dave Filoni announced at the London Star Wars Celebration in July 2016 that Thrawn would be reintroduced into the franchise in the third season of the Rebels series. The character debuted in the season 3 premiere, "Steps Into Shadow", which aired on September 24, 2016.

Though in Legends works Thrawn was mostly used in post-Return of the Jedi storylines, Rebels takes place within the five years before the events of the original 1977 film. After seeing an advanced clip from the series, Zahn told StarWars.com, "even that short bit was awesome, and just a bit surrealistic. Authors don't get to see our creations come to life very often, and it was a real treat to see a walking, talking Grand Admiral Thrawn".

Acknowledging that Thrawn had long been considered by Lucasfilm when developing projects, Filoni said that in particular, the character had been on his list of potential villains when developing Rebels. He explained that unlike how the character Ahsoka Tano has been a foil for Darth Vader in previous seasons of Rebels, "There's no one to defend [the Rebels] against Thrawn. We want to treat him like a big-time villain, as much as Darth Vader, but on the strategic, military side of things."

==== Storylines ====
In "Steps into Shadow", Thrawn is the commander of the Seventh Fleet, recently promoted to Grand Admiral for crushing a rebel insurgency on Batonn without regard for civilian casualties. He is brought in by Imperial Governor Arihnda Pryce to help destroy the series' eponymous rebel cell. A patient tactician, Thrawn allows the rebels to escape, intending to manipulate them into orchestrating the complete downfall of their rebellion. In "Hera's Heroes", he takes command of the Imperial occupation of Ryloth, home planet of Hera Syndulla, and has his first face-to-face contact with the rebels. He reappears in "Iron Squadron", where he orders the incompetent Admiral Konstantine to deal with rebels and rebel sympathizers in the Mykapo system; after Konstantine's ship is disabled, Thrawn arrives in his personal Star Destroyer, the Chimaera, and is revealed to have previously encountered rebel Commander Jun Sato. "An Inside Man" reveals Thrawn now in charge of the Imperial occupation of the planet Lothal, overseeing the factory where the new TIE Defender and various other pieces of equipment are manufactured. He puts an end to rebel acts of sabotage by enforcing a policy of the workers testing their creations and is also shown to be studying pieces of artwork that grant insight into each member of the Ghost crew. He also determines that there is a rebel spy within the Imperial ranks, but intends to use this to his advantage. In "Warhead", Thrawn uses probe droids to determine that Sato's hidden rebel base is located on one of less than a hundred planets. Thrawn is shown to be skilled in hand-to-hand combat in "Through Imperial Eyes", and learns that Agent Kallus is the rebel spy. In "Secret Cargo", Thrawn and Pryce pursue Senator Mon Mothma, who is being transported to safety by the rebels after speaking out publicly against Palpatine. In "Zero Hour", Thrawn confronts Kallus about being Fulcrum, and executes his carefully planned attack on the rebel base on Atollon. He is thwarted by the ingenuity of the rebels and the assistance of Bendu, who cryptically warns Thrawn of his impending defeat, "like many arms surrounding you in a cold embrace". In the series finale "Family Reunion – and Farewell", Thrawn's Star Destroyer is attacked by purrgil while hovering over Lothal. Ensnared in the creatures' tentacles while simultaneously being confronted by the Force-wielding Ezra Bridger, who brought the purrgil to defend Lothal, the Star Destroyer is dragged by them into hyperspace, leaving both Thrawn's and Bridger's fates unknown.

==== Thrawn trilogy (2017–2019) ====
In a prerecorded video also presented at the July 2016 London Star Wars Celebration, Zahn announced that he was writing a new novel titled Star Wars: Thrawn, which was released by Del Rey Books in April 2017. According to Zahn, it was "very exciting" to write the character again, and he noted that "with this book I'll be visiting a part of his life that I never before had a chance to explore". Zahn later said, "I get to show how he's treated by his fellow officers and shipmates on his way up the military ladder, particularly when he's not in a command position over them."

Although in Legends works Thrawn was mostly placed in post-Return of the Jedi storylines, Thrawn is set before the events of the original 1977 film. It covers several years between Thrawn's "first encounter" with the Empire and the events of the third season of Rebels, chronicling his rise to power. In the novel, seemingly exiled Chiss warrior Thrawn is rescued by Imperial soldiers, and soon proves a valuable asset to the Empire. His cunning and expertise as a tactician soon attract the attention of Emperor Palpatine, though Thrawn's renegade tactics ignite the ire of his superiors. As he rises in rank, Thrawn trains his aide-de-camp Ensign Eli Vanto in the ways of war, and finds himself in an uneasy alliance with ruthless administrator Arihnda Pryce while in search of rebel leader Nightswan. Ultimately, Thrawn reveals himself to Nightswan as a double agent for the Chiss Ascendancy, his exile having been faked in order to assist with his infiltration.

A six issue comic book miniseries adaptation of the first novel by Marvel Comics began in early 2018, and ended in June of that year.

A sequel to the novel, titled Thrawn: Alliances, was released on July 24, 2018. This novel is set during the reign of the Empire. The main story line follows Grand Admiral Thrawn a "brilliant strategist" and the "ruthless enforcer" Darth Vader on a mission to investigate a threat to the Empire on a planet called Batuu, which resides at the edges of the Unknown Regions. This is the same planet that many years previously Thrawn, then an officer of the Chiss Ascendancy, crossed paths with General Anakin Skywalker, flashbacks to this encounter tells of their "uneasy alliance" while facing several dangers.

A third novel, Thrawn: Treason, was released on July 23, 2019. Set before the finale of Rebels, Thrawn: Treason features Grand Admiral Thrawn crossing paths with Director Krennic as well as the return of Eli Vanto. Chronologically, Thrawn: Treason is set between the Rebels episodes "Rebel Assault" and "Family Reunion – and Farewell."

==== Thrawn: Ascendancy trilogy (2020–2021) ====
At the 2019 New York Comic Con, a new trilogy from Timothy Zahn was announced, to be entitled Thrawn: The Ascendency Trilogy, or simply the Thrawn Ascendancy trilogy, to launch with Book I: Chaos Rising in May 2020. After being delayed twice, the first novel was ultimately released on September 1, 2020. In the novel, it was revealed that Thrawn was born as Kivu'raw'nuru (core name Vurawn) before being adopted by the Mitth family, changing his name to Mitth'raw'nuru (core name Thrawn). The novel also covered more of Thrawn's backstory alongside other Chiss characters, such as Ar'alani, that also appeared in Thrawn: Treason, the previous novel by publication order.

A sequel to Chaos Rising, titled Thrawn Ascendancy: Greater Good, was released on April 27, 2021.

The third book of the trilogy called Thrawn Ascendancy: Lesser Evil, was released on November 16, 2021.

==== Ahsoka (2023) ====
Lars Mikkelsen as Grand Admiral Thrawn in Ahsoka, the character's first live-action appearance

Grand Admiral Thrawn is mentioned by Ahsoka Tano in the Disney+ series The Mandalorian in "Chapter 13: The Jedi" (2020) as the master to Morgan Elsbeth, the Magistrate of Corvus. He is mentioned again in "Chapter 23: The Spies" (2023) during a meeting between Moff Gideon and the Shadow Council, a group of remnant Imperial warlords, who debate his rumored return and the delivery of Project Necromancer.

Thrawn made his live-action debut in the 2023 Disney+ series Ahsoka in "Part Six: Far, Far Away". It is revealed that the purrgil took Thrawn and Ezra to the planet Peridea, homeworld of the Dathomir witches, and located outside the original Star Wars galaxy. While Ezra managed to get away from him, Thrawn woke the local Nightsisters and allied with their Great Mothers, and is served by Stormtrooper Captain Enoch. Dark Jedi Baylan Skoll, his apprentice Shin Hati and a liberated Morgan Elsbeth locate Thrawn to bring him out of his exile to lead the remnants of the Galactic Empire. "Part Eight: The Jedi, the Witch, and the Warlord" culminates with Thrawn's return to the galaxy. Thrawn's Star Destroyer, the Chimaera, is depicted approaching the planet Dathomir, docked to the hyperspace ring ship Eye of Sion, following his escape from Peridea. Unbeknownst to him, Ezra stowed away onboard his ship and returned to the Republic.

==== Tales of the Empire (2024) ====
Thrawn appears in the second season of Star Wars: Tales, titled Tales of the Empire, with Lars Mikkelsen returning to voice the character. The series focuses on the start of his partnership with Morgan Elsbeth, when Thrawn was an Admiral in the Empire.

==== Other works ====
Thrawn is mentioned in the 2017 Chuck Wendig novel Star Wars: Aftermath: Empire's End as the source of the information about the Unknown Regions which Palpatine uses in his Contingency plan. This plan results in the creation of the First Order.

==== Video games ====
Thrawn appears as a playable character in the 2017 real-time strategy mobile game Star Wars: Force Arena, and was later introduced to Star Wars: Galaxy of Heroes, a turn-based role-playing game, that summer, as both a special event boss and playable character. He is a bonus playable character in Lego Star Wars: The Skywalker Saga, available in the Star Wars Rebels character pack sold as downloadable content.

== Reception ==
In 2016, Anthony Breznican of Entertainment Weekly called Thrawn a "fan favorite" and "one of the most significant characters to ever emerge from the Expanded Universe", and Brian Truitt of USA Today named the character "one of Star Wars fandom's favorite villains". Comicbook.com called Thrawn "arguably the most popular character in the Star Wars Legends universe" in 2017, and Linda Hansen-Raj wrote that the character "carries a lasting legacy as one of Star Wars' greatest and most complex antagonists." In 2014, GamesRadar's Sam Ashurst called Thrawn "hugely popular amongst fans, partly because of his tactical genius, partly because of his progressive attitude to his employees but mainly due to the fact he's got a blue face" and "easily the coolest villain in the Expanded Universe", noting Thrawn's loss as one of the major consequences of Lucasfilm's abandonment of the old expanded universe for Star Wars: The Force Awakens. Emmet Asher-Perrin of Tor.com noted in 2016 that as "one of the most popular Expanded Universe villains" and "one of the most threatening antagonists that the Star Wars universe had on hand", the character's removal from canon continuity "had many fans crying foul".

In 2008, Jesse Schedeen of IGN credited Thrawn and the Thrawn trilogy with "kickstarting" the Star Wars expanded universe", and in 2015 Empire suggested that Thrawn's character helped "revitalize and legitimise" the expanded universe when it was failing. Eric Goldman wrote for IGN in 2008, "Diabolical, brilliant and ruthless, Thrawn was an excellent Star Wars villain, following in the footsteps of the likes of Grand Moff Tarkin," adding that "his status as the highest ranking non-human in the Empire was a very interesting aspect". In 2006, Zahn called Thrawn and Mara Jade his favorite of the characters he created. Zahn said in July 2016, "A writer never knows which characters are going to click with the readers, and it was highly gratifying to me that Thrawn captured the imaginations of so many people over the past quarter century."

The character has been on many "top" lists of Star Wars characters, praising his villainy and character. In a list of fifteen Star Wars villains, Schedeen placed Thrawn as second best, beaten by Darth Vader, focusing on his greatness as a commander and tactician. In 2008, IGN ranked him as the tenth best overall Star Wars character, noting his influence in the expanded universe, and UGO listed him as the third greatest expanded universe character the same year. Empire listed Thrawn fifth in their list of the 25 best of the more obscure Star Wars characters in 2015.

In November 2016, Lars Mikkelsen was nominated for a 2017 Annie Award for Outstanding Achievement, Voice Acting in an Animated Feature Production for his portrayal of Thrawn on Star Wars Rebels. For his live-action debut in Ahsoka, Mikkelsen was nominated for a Critics' Choice Super Award for Best Villain in a Series in 2024.

== Merchandising ==
An Admiral Thrawn 3 3/4 inch action figure was produced by Kenner/Hasbro as part of their 1998 Power of the Force 2 Expanded Universe line. Another figure was released for the 2008 Legacy Collection, bundled in a "Comic 2-Pack" with a Talon Karrde figure and a Dark Horse Heir of the Empire issue #1 comic. Two versions of Thrawn were produced for the Star Wars Miniatures collectible miniatures game: one for the 2005 Universe expansion, and a second for the 2009 Imperial Entanglements expansion. In 2010, Sideshow Collectibles released a sixth scale Thrawn figure, with a command chair as part of the deluxe version. A 6.75" Thrawn mini bust was produced by Gentle Giant in 2014. All representations of the character have included a pet ysalamir, except the 2009 miniature. Hasbro released a Thrawn action figure as part of its Rebels series of figures in 2016. In 2017, Hasbro released a 6" Thrawn figure as a part of its Black Series line, as well as a San Diego Comic Con version featuring enhanced packaging and accessories. In the same year, Funko released the Star Wars Rebels Grand Admiral Thrawn #170 POP! figurine as a "2017 Galactic Convention Exclusive" related to the 2017 Star Wars Celebration. Additionally, Lego released a Grand Admiral Thrawn minifigure, included in the 2017 set The Phantom.
