= Survivor's Quest =

2004 novel by Timothy Zahn

- Author: Timothy Zahn
- Cover artist: Steven D. Anderson
- Language: English
- Series: Star Wars
- Genre: Science fiction
- Publisher: Del Rey
- Publication date: Hardcover: February 1, 2004; Paperback: December 1, 2004
- Publication place: United States
- Media type: Hardcover & Paperback
- Pages: Hardcover: 368; Paperback: 480
- ISBN: 0-345-45918-0
- Preceded by: Fool's Bargain
- Followed by: The Golden Globe

Survivor's Quest is a novel set in the Star Wars expanded universe, published by Del Rey on February 1, 2004. Written by Timothy Zahn, it is a sequel to Zahn's 1998 Star Wars novel Vision of the Future.

== Setting ==
Survivor's Quest is set in 22 ABY, three years after the events of Vision of the Future and three years before those of Vector Prime.

== Characters ==
- Luke Skywalker
- Mara Jade Skywalker
- Aristocra Chaf'orm'bintrano
- Dean Jinzler
- Evlyn
- 501st Legion
- Chak Fel
- Jorad Pressor
- General Prard'ras'kleoni
- Talon Karrde

== Plot ==
Survivor's Quest opens with a meeting between Talon Karrde and Luke and Mara Jade Skywalker. Karrde's people had earlier picked up an urgent transmission, addressed to Luke, coming from Admiral Voss Parck on the planet Nirauan. Before the message could be passed on, however, it had been stolen by a member of Karrde's own organisation, one Dean Jinzler. Fearing that the message might be somehow connected with the unknown menace Parck and Baron Fel had warned them about two years earlier, Luke and Mara decide to head out to Nirauan.

There, they learn that the message had in fact come from Chiss Aristocra Chaf'orm'bintrano (or "Formbi"). The Chiss have found the remains of the colonization and exploratory vessel Outbound Flight, which had been destroyed by Grand Admiral Thrawn many years previous. Now, the Chiss wish to hand over their find to the New Republic, and Luke and Mara join the odd group—which includes a squad of stormtroopers from the 501st, a remnant of an alien people, the Geroons, who owe a strange debt to the people of Outbound Flight, and a false New New Republic ambassador—which will visit the site of the tragedy.

As they voyage on the Chaf Envoy deeper into Chiss space, into a treacherous cluster of stars known as the Redoubt, Luke and Mara grow more uneasy. Occurrences of sabotage and theft only serve to deepen their suspicions. On top of that, Mara begins to feel torn between her duty to the New Republic and her troubled respect for the Empire.

The expedition reaches its destination: the remains of the Dreadnaught cruisers that made up the Outbound Flight project. Not only are the ships fairly intact, but Mara can sense life. There are survivors, possibly hundreds of them. Suddenly, everything comes together in a whirlwind of events. The supposedly peaceloving Geroons instead are revealed to be the bloodthirsty Vagaari, who desire revenge against the Chiss and Outbound Flight for their defeat at the hands of Thrawn during the Jedi vessel's destruction. Luke, Mara, the Chiss, the Imperials, and the embittered survivors now must work together against the Vagaari if any of them are to come out alive.

They manage to defeat the Vagaari, who in turn sabotage the Chaf Envoy and commandeer one of the Dreadnaughts. The Vagaari then head back through the Redoubt to attack the Chiss command station, leaving Luke, Mara, and the others practically stranded. Following the welcome discovery of a Delta-Twelve Skysprite vessel, however, Luke and Mara are soon pursuing the rogue Dreadnaught. They catch up to it and make their way aboard, killing its crew and commandeering the vessel. They find out that the main Vagaari "colony ship" is actually a starfighter carrier that is beginning to overwhelm the Chiss station's defenses. Using a fake signal, Luke and Mara trick the Vagaari into believing the Dreadnaught to be a friendly ship. However, Luke and Mara use the Dreadnaught under their control after a showdown with a droideka and the fanatical Vagaari Supreme Commander Estosh, to aid the Chiss fighters and to defeat the other Vagaari forces.

The survivors are entrusted into the care of the Empire of the Hand, and Luke and Mara finally have time to settle down and enjoy their marriage.

== Development ==
Lucasfilm and Del Rey planned Survivor's Quest as a Luke/Mara parallel to Tatooine Ghost, a Han Solo/Princess Leia book being written at the time. During the outline process, Zahn got the idea to connect the novel to Outbound Flight, another Star Wars novel he was writing about a doomed space expedition. He decided to have Survivor's Quest cover what was essentially the end of the Outbound Flight Project story before the beginning was explored in the titular novel, already in the works but scheduled to be published second.

== Fool's Bargain ==
Fool's Bargain is an e-book novella written by Zahn in conjunction with Survivor's Quest. Set before the events of that novel, it tells the backstory of a 501st Legion stormtrooper. The novella was first released electronically on February 3, 2004, and later published in the paperback edition of Survivor's Quest on December 28, 2004.

== Reception ==
Publishers Weekly summarized: "Full of action and more twists than a corkscrew, this stand-alone SF adventure novel is sure to satisfy its target teen audience." Booklist said: "Not for beginners with Star Wars fiction, perhaps, but in the hands of tie-in Master Zahn, a thoroughly absorbing story for the seasoned reader."

The novel reached number nine on The New York Times Best Seller list.
