= Quadrail series =

Science fiction book series by Timothy Zahn

The Quadrail series is a sequence of five (as of 2012) science fiction novels by Hugo Award–winning author Timothy Zahn.

In a space opera setting, human Frank Compton is hired by the Spiders, servant beings who operate the intergalactic Quadrail network, and their enigmatic masters the Chahwyn, to investigate a group-mind, the Modhri, which infiltrates other sentient beings and controls them either directly, or by subconscious suggestion. Together with Bayta, an enigmatic woman the Spiders have assigned to help him, he researches and combats the Modhri and later its controller, the Shonkla'raa.

== Books ==
=== Night Train to Rigel ===
Night Train to Rigel
- Author: Timothy Zahn
- Language: English
- Series: Quadrail series
- Genre: Science fiction
- Publisher: Tor
- Publication date: 2005
- Publication place: United States
- Followed by: The Third Lynx

Night Train to Rigel is the first book in the series, published in 2005.

==== Plot ====
The story starts with former government agent, Frank Compton, meeting a young man who drops dead at his feet. Compton finds a ticket to a strange, interstellar train called the Quadrail. During Compton's ride on the Quadrail he falls asleep, and wakes up in the custody of the spiders, the operators of the Quadrail. The Spiders explain to Compton their worries of a weapon of mass destruction, which may be able to bypass their Quadrail security. Compton agrees to help, and is given a pass for the Quadrails and they assign him a traveling companion named Bayta, who has a strange talent for being telepathic in her communication to the Spiders.

Frank Compton discovers the power behind the Quadrail system: an ancient civilization called the Chahwyn. On the course of his travels on the Quadrail, he learns of the existence of the Modhri: the equally ancient enemy of the Chahwyn. The Modhri has its mind bent on controlling the galaxy.

=== The Third Lynx ===
The Third Lynx
- Author: Timothy Zahn
- Language: English
- Series: Quadrail series
- Genre: Science fiction
- Publisher: Tor
- Publication date: 2007
- Publication place: United States
- Preceded by: Night Train to Rigel
- Followed by: Odd Girl Out

The Third Lynx is the second book in the series, released in hardcover on October 30, 2007.

==== Plot ====
The Third Lynx starts several months after the events of Night Train to Rigel. Having destroyed the hub world of the Modhri, Frank Campton is riding the Quadrail with Bayta, his traveling companion and friend, when a murder occurs on the Quadrail car which he is traveling on. The victim is a middle-aged man who had proposed a deal to Compton a few hours before.

=== Odd Girl Out ===
Odd Girl Out
- Author: Timothy Zahn
- Language: English
- Series: Quadrail series
- Genre: Science fiction
- Publisher: Tor
- Publication date: 2008
- Publication place: United States
- Preceded by: The Third Lynx
- Followed by: The Domino Pattern

Odd Girl Out is the third book in the series, published in 2008.

==== Plot ====
The story starts shortly after the events in The Third Lynx. Upon arriving home, Frank Compton is awaited in his apartment by an unknown girl, who asks his aid in saving her sister. Declining her request, he sends her away.

The following day, he learns the girl has been brutally murdered, and one of his weapons is found at the scene. Together with Bayta, Compton travels to New Tigris to locate the girl's sister. There he learns both girls are part of an experiment by the Chahwyn, Compton and Bayta's employers, to create friendlier, symbiotic version of the Modhran coral they have been fighting for the past year. However, the Modhri has become aware of the project, and aims to assimilate the 'Abomination' before it can escape.

=== The Domino Pattern ===
The Domino Pattern
- Author: Timothy Zahn
- Language: English
- Series: Quadrail series
- Genre: Science fiction
- Publisher: Tor
- Publication date: 2010
- Publication place: United States
- Preceded by: Odd Girl Out
- Followed by: Judgment at Proteus

The Domino Pattern is the fourth installment in the series. The Domino Pattern was published by Tor Books and was released in hardcover on January 5, 2010.

==== Plot ====
Frank and Bayta plan to travel to the Filian sector of the universe, to follow up on the Mohdri-infected Filiaelians they encountered in Odd Girl Out. To get there they need to take one of the Quadrail super-express trains, which won't make any stops for six weeks. Once their journey has started, passengers start to die, apparently murdered, despite the fact that Spider procedures should prevent any weapons or poisons from entering the train. What follows is a race against the clock to find the murderer.

=== Judgment at Proteus ===
Judgment at Proteus
- Author: Timothy Zahn
- Language: English
- Series: Quadrail series
- Genre: Science fiction
- Publisher: Tor
- Publication date: 2012
- Publication place: United States
- Preceded by: The Domino Pattern

Judgment at Proteus is fifth and apparent final novel in the series. Judgment at Proteus was published by Tor Books and was released in hardcover on June 5, 2012.

==== Plot ====
After their discovery in The Domino Pattern that the Shonkla’raa, the original masters of the Modhri, were in fact a special cast of Filiaelian, and that the Filiaeli have re-engineered their genetic structure, Frank and Bayta escort Terese German, who seems to be of special interest to their enemies, to Proteus Station, one of the main Filiaeli genetic research centers.

== Universe ==
=== Characters ===
==== Frank Compton ====
A Human from Earth's Western Alliance (a political/geographical subdivision, including, at least, some of North and South America), and former agent of Western Alliance Intelligence (Westali). In the first book he is recruited under false pretenses by the Spiders, to help stop a force which is trying to take over the Quadrail from them. Compton was fired from Westali for publicly questioning the politics of his superiors. He is well-versed in different combat techniques, investigation and military strategy.

==== Bayta ====
Although human in appearance, Bayta is in fact a symbiotic hybrid of Human and Chahwyn, and as such capable of communicating telepathically with the Chahwyn and the Spiders. She is assigned as Compton's assistant in 'Night Train to Rigel', and remains so throughout the series.

==== The Modhri ====
A group mind formed by salt-water coral, the Modhri can infect other creatures when they touch (are scratched by) the coral, after which a small colony of coral polyps will form in the host's nervous system, able to influence or control the host. Usually the host will not be aware of being controlled, either because it is done in the form of subconscious suggestion, or, in the case of direct control, it being rationalized as blackouts or sleep. When close enough, different sections of coral communicate telepathically, linking all coral and coral-infected hosts (walkers, or eyes) together in a single group mind, the size and composition of which constantly changes as portions of the mind move into and out of contact with other portions, exchanging knowledge as they do. The range of the telepathic link is mostly determined by the size of the combined coral segments.

==== The Melding ====
A "kinder, gentler" version of The Modhri which works cooperatively and symbiotically with its hosts, instead of covertly controlling them or taking them over completely, as the Modhri does. Introduction of the coral polyps is performed differently for these hosts, to allow the more harmonious relationship. It is speculated, however, that if the normal touch infection vector is used, the Melding may operate the same as the Modhri, and take over its hosts, although the Modhri's deal with Morse in the 5th book, implies this need not be the case.

==== Other recurring characters ====
- Bruce McMicking
- Larry Cecil Hardin
- Korak Fayr
- Ackerley Morse
- Rebekah Beach
- Terese German

=== Races ===
- Humans
- Chahwyn
- Spiders
- Filiaeli
- Bellidos
- Juriani
- Cimmaheem
- Shorshians
- Halkas
- Tra‘ho’sej
- Nemuti
- Fibibib
- Pirk

== The Quadrail ==
The Quadrail is a train system including multiple tracks, each consisting of four rails, wrapped inside of a tube. The tube is intended to operate at vacuum, although leakage through the pressure seals at the stations over hundreds of years has allowed a small air pressure to accumulate. The tube allows for faster-than-light transport through most of the known galaxy and includes the 12 Empires recognized in Zahn's Quadrail series.

At the core of the Quadrail is a "quantum thread" known as the Coreline. The Coreline is the mechanism which accelerates the Quadrail train system through an unexplained physical phenomenon, although the passengers aren't aware of this (general speculation is that one of the four rails provides the motive power). Standard Quadrail trains can travel at up to a light-year a minute, but in all actuality, train speed is controlled by proximity to the Coreline (e.g. the closer an object gets to the Coreline, the faster it moves). Therefore, some specialized Quadrail maintenance trains can travel faster than standard Quadrail trains.

The Quadrail is operated throughout the Galaxy by the Spiders - an enigmatic race with long mechanical spider like legs and spherical bodies.

There are three classes of seating on a typical Quadrail train - First, Second, and Third. Among the different types of cars are compartment cars, only available in first class, coach (seating) cars, available in all three classes with decreasing comfort depending on the class, dining cars, available in all three classes with decreasing conveniences and selections depending on the class, recreation/entertainment cars, which include exercise facilities and bathing facilities, available in all three classes, and baggage cars. Typically a train will have, going from front to back, an engine car, which is not internally accessible, one or more compartment cars (individual compartments have sleeping, bathing and toilet facilities), one or more first class seating cars, a first class dining car, a first class recreation/entertainment car, second class seating, dining and entertainment cars, third class seating, dining and entertainment cars, and one or more baggage cars. The cars are internally pressurized and are joined by pass-through airlocks. Passage from one car to another is controlled by the class of ticket, with each class ticket giving entry to its own class and lesser class cars. Each class has a first aid station/infirmary, located either in the dining car or the entertainment car.

=== Known Quadrail stations ===
- Terran Federation
- Terra
- Yandro
- New Tigris
- Helvanti
- Proteus
- Kerfsis
- Sistarrko
- Homshil

=== Types ===
- Tender
- Local
- Express
- Super-Express
