= John Whitman (author) =

American writer and video game designer

- Born: United States
- Occupation(s): Writer and martial arts instructor

John Whitman is an American author and martial arts instructor. He is the founder of the Krav Maga Alliance and the former president of Krav Maga Worldwide.

== Early life ==
Whitman was born on February 13, 1967, and attended the University of California, Berkeley, from 1985 to 1989, where he graduated with a B.A. in literature. He also attended Boston University from 1990 to 1991, graduating with an M.A. in Creative Writing.

He was the victim of several violent encounters in his youth, which involved having a gun pointed at him and being attacked by two separate people, which inspired him to learn self-defense. He attended his first Krav Maga demonstration in October 1991.

== Krav Maga ==
Whitman founded the Krav Maga Alliance, and he has been teaching Krav Maga since 1994, and served as president of Krav Maga Worldwide for eight years. He also became the first person in the world to be given a Senior Instructor degree from the Wingate Institute. As well as teaching Krav Maga to civilians and military personnel, Whitman helped to develop training programs to be utilised by other instructors of the martial art. He has also written two books about the martial art, and continues to teach Krav Maga.

He has instructor degrees from the Krav Maga Association of America, Krav Maga Worldwide, and Wingate University.

Whitman was awarded a sixth Degree Black Belt in Krav Maga in 2017. He also helped to develop the Krav Maga Pro app. He has also served as the CEO of Focus Self Defense and Fitness.

== Writing ==
Whitman worked as the Executive Editor of Time Warner Audio books from 1991 to 1999. He also wrote the scripts for various Star Wars radio dramas, and was also responsible for editing Brian Daley's scripts after Daley's death.

From 1997 to 1998, he also wrote the Star Wars: Galaxy of Fear series, which was a series of young readers horror books set within the Star Wars universe. The series was inspired by the success of Goosebumps, and was originally planned to last for six books, before Lucasfilm asked Whitman to expand it to twelve. Whitman was asked to include the character Mammon Hoole, who had appeared in Star Wars books written by other authors, as a key character in Galaxy of Fear. Although most of the other characters in the Galaxy of Fear series were created by Whitman, the books also included appearances from characters from the Star Wars films. Whitman also had to gain approval from George Lucas to kill off the character Dr. Evazan.

Other Star Wars books written by Whitman include A Droid's Tale, Luke Skywalker's Race Against Time, and The Greatest Battles, and he wrote dialogue for the Droid Works video game. He has also written various books based on the 24 television series, as well as adaptations of Digimon and The Mummy Returns.

In 2023, Whitman returned to writing and published Disunion: Book One - The Mantiz Gambit, the first book in a new science fiction series.

== Bibliography ==
Star Wars Galaxy of Fear: Eaten Alive

Star Wars Galaxy of Fear: City of the Dead

Star Wars Galaxy of Fear: Planet Plague

Star Wars Galaxy of Fear: The Nightmare Machine

Star Wars Galaxy of Fear: Ghost of the Jedi

Star Wars Galaxy of Fear: Army of Terror

Star Wars Galaxy of Fear: The Brain Spiders

Star Wars Galaxy of Fear: The Swarm

Star Wars Galaxy of Fear: Spore

Star Wars Galaxy of Fear: The Doomsday Ship

Star Wars Galaxy of Fear: Clones

Star Wars Galaxy of Fear: The Hunger

Star Wars: Droid Works (video game)

Digimon: Adventures on File Island

Digimon: Leomon's Challenge

The Mummy Returns (Junior Novelization)

Planet of the Apes (Junior Novelization)

Planet of the Apes: Force

Planet of the Apes: Resistance

24 Declassified: Cat's Claw

24 Declassified: Chaos Theory

24: Trinity

24: Veto Power

Complete Krav Maga : The Ultimate Guide to over 230 Self-Defense and Combative Techniques

Black Belt Krav Maga: Advanced Training In Krav Maga

Disunion: Book One - The Mantiz Gambit
