= Galaxy of Fear =

Science fiction novels series

Star Wars: Galaxy of Fear is a series of 12 young adult, science fiction horror novels set in the Star Wars galaxy six months after Star Wars: Episode IV – A New Hope. The series was written by John Whitman, and released from February 1997 through to October 1998. The books ranged from 100 pages to 200 pages in large print.

== Synopsis ==
The books tell the stories of three people and a droid: Tash Arranda, Zak Arranda, their Shi'ido uncle Mammon Hoole, and his droid DV-9. Tash and Zak are survivors of the destruction of Alderaan, two Force-sensitive children who are trying to hide from the Galactic Empire while investigating the lost histories of the Jedi.

The first six books form an arc. The protagonists discover pieces of a large Imperial experiment in biological weapons, codenamed Project Starscream. The first six books deal with the heroes discovering the various components of Project Starscream, each dangerous in its own right.

The next six books lacked a central arc. The protagonists, now wanted fugitives, travel from planet to planet attempting to avoid Imperial authorities.

== List of books ==
1. Eaten Alive (February 1997)
2. City of the Dead (February 1997)
3. Planet Plague (April 1997)
4. The Nightmare Machine (June 1997)
5. Ghost of the Jedi (August 1997)
6. Army of Terror (October 1997)
7. The Brain Spiders (December 1997)
8. The Swarm (February 1998)
9. Spore (April 1998)
10. The Doomsday Ship (June 1998)
11. Clones (August 1998)
12. The Hunger (August 1998)

== Reviews ==
Devin Rose reviewed the series of books for the Chicago Tribune and said "I think all this Star Wars' mania is a bit of a yawn but Eaten Alive was star-rific!".

Natalie Zutter at Reactormag reviewed the series and wrote "Galaxy of Fear was the stuff of your deepest, darkest fears: slimy bump monsters, boneworms that sucked you dry, brain-swapping spider robot monks, cute li’l babies that could turn people into goo and suck them up…"

== See also ==
- Goosebumps
