= Thrawn Ascendancy =

Star Wars novels trilogy

Star Wars: Thrawn Ascendancy
- Thrawn Ascendancy: Chaos Rising, the first book in the series, promotional banner
- Chaos Rising (2020); Greater Good (2021); Lesser Evil (2021)
- Author: Timothy Zahn
- Country: United States
- Language: English
- Genre: Adventure; War; Science fiction
- Publisher: Del Rey Books
- Published: September 1, 2020 – November 16, 2021
- Media type: Print (hardcover and paperback), audiobook, e-book
- No. of books: 3

Thrawn Ascendancy, also known as Thrawn: The Ascendancy Trilogy or simply The Ascendancy Trilogy, is a trilogy series of Star Wars novels by Timothy Zahn. The books Chaos Rising (2020), Greater Good (2021), and Lesser Evil (2021), follow Thrawn as he rises through the ranks of the Chiss Expansionary Defense Fleet as war brews between the various Chiss families throughout the Unknown Regions.

The trilogy is a prequel to Thrawn's exploits in Thrawn (2017) and the TV series Star Wars Rebels (2014–2018). According to the timeline of the books, the events in Thrawn Ascendancy occur after the 2002 film Attack of the Clones and before the events of the 2015 novel Dark Disciple: A Clone Wars Novel and the 2005 film Revenge of the Sith.

== Setting ==
Thrawn Ascendancy takes place in the Chiss Ascendancy, an oligarchic autocracy residing deep in the Unknown Regions of the galaxy. The system is headed by the Nine Ruling Families: Boadil, Chaf, Clarr, Dasklo, Irizi, Mitth, Obbic, Plikh, and the Ufsa and is overseen by a ruling body named the Syndicure.

Due to their heavily isolationist belief systems, the Ascendancy was not involved in any external affairs and kept their presence hidden to the rest of the galaxy except in fairy tales heard from inhabitants in the Outer Rim. Their focus is primarily on research and exploration rather than expansion into the Galactic Empire, but Thrawn's eventual rise to power in the Empire went against their primary desires.

The Chiss Expansionary Defense Fleet composes the Ascendancy's military fleet and monitored the rise of the Grysk forces as enemies of the Ascendancy.

== Novels ==
=== Chaos Rising (2020) ===
The first novel explores Thrawn and his companion Ar'alani's backstory set against the present day several years into the Clone Wars where Thrawn, a controversial figure in the Ascendancy, is tasked with tracking down a threat by the Nikardun Destiny led by Yiv the Benevolent.

=== Greater Good (2021) ===
The second novel takes place several months after Chaos Rising and sees Thrawn's fleet continuing to track the Nikardun threat when a mysterious figure called the Magys seeks his help to save her planet from extinction. The resulting expedition leads Thrawn, Ar'alani, and their compatriots to discover a new threat that has been quietly brewing. Flashbacks show Haplif, an Agbui spy, infiltrating Chiss society at the behalf of Jixtus (eventually revealed to be a Grysk) in order to sow discord between the Mitth and Irizi families.

=== Lesser Evil (2021) ===
The final novel, Lesser Evil, follows Thrawn exploring the legend of the Starflash, a mythic weapon from ancient Chiss history and having to make a difficult decision in his quest for the Ascendancy's salvation as the tides of war continue to grow within and without the Ascendancy.

== Reception ==
Gizmodo said of Chaos Rising: "[it is] a Star Wars book quite unlike anything we’ve experienced so far in the last six years—in ways that are good and bad," calling the world "fascinatingly fleshed out" and the novel a "treat worth sinking your teeth into, although it may prove to be a little too rich for its own good at times." Star Wars News Net stated that the novel "will make you look at Thrawn in a completely new light...My faith in Star Wars feels very strong after finishing Chaos Rising." CNET reviewed Greater Good: "It becomes more engaging as it goes along, but fails to satisfy as a standalone story and ends on a disappointingly limp note."

Chaos Rising debuted at number 9 on the New York Times Best Seller list for Hardcover Fiction in the week of September 20, 2020. Greater Good debuted at number 10 during the week of May 16, 2021.

== See also ==
- Star Wars: Thrawn, the first novel in the canon Thrawn series.
- Timothy Zahn, the creator of Grand Admiral Thrawn and writer of this book.
- Grand Admiral Thrawn, the main character of this book.
- List of Star Wars books, the list of novels published in the Star Wars series.
