= Star Wars: Thrawn Ascendancy: Lesser Evil =

2021 novel by Timothy Zahn

- Cover of Star Wars: Thrawn Ascendancy: Lesser Evil
- Author: Timothy Zahn
- Language: English
- Series: Star Wars: Thrawn trilogy
- Genre: Science fiction
- Publisher: Del Rey Books
- Publication date: November 16, 2021
- Publication place: United States
- Pages: 548
- ISBN: 9780593158326
- Preceded by: Star Wars: Thrawn Ascendancy: Greater Good

Star Wars: Thrawn Ascendancy: Lesser Evil is a Star Wars novel by Timothy Zahn, published on November 16, 2021 by Del Rey Books.

== Plot ==
Lesser Evil focuses on the end of Grand Admiral Thrawn's rise through the ranks in the Chiss Ascendancy nation. It introduces the fictional Kilji species, whose leaders act as co-villains alongside Jixtus.

== Reception ==
Sean Keane of CNET called it a "fun Thrawn adventure" but criticized the lack of information revealed about the series' villains, "Jixtus" and the Grysks. The book received the 2022 Dragon Award for "Best Media Tie-In Novel".

== See also ==
- List of Star Wars books, the list of novels published in the Star Wars series.
