= List of Star Wars species (A–E) =

This is a list of Star Wars species, containing the names of fictional sentient species from the Star Wars franchise beginning with the letters A through E. Star Wars is an American epic space opera film series created by George Lucas. The first film in the series, Star Wars, was released on May 25, 1977, and became a worldwide pop culture phenomenon, followed by five sequels, three prequels and several spin-off films and television series. Many species of alien creatures (often humanoid) are depicted. For the other species listed alphabetically, see the following:

- List of Star Wars species (F–J)
- List of Star Wars species (K–O)
- List of Star Wars species (P–T)
- List of Star Wars species (U–Z)

== Abednedo ==
The Abednedo are a common sentient species native to the planet of the same name. Abednedos are tall humanoids with mouth tendrils, long faces, and widely spaced fleshy nostrils; they often have a brown or tan skin color. Abednedos appearing in the Star Wars saga include Resistance pilots Ello Asty and C'ai Threnalli.

== Abyssin ==
The Abyssin inhabit the planet Byss. They are a nomadic race, often described as "brutish and violent." They stand approximately two meters tall and have a humanoid appearance, with long limbs and weathered skin. They also possess a single large slit-pupiled eye which dominates their greenish-tan foreheads. Abyssins do not take kindly to derogatory nicknames regarding their eye, such as "monoc," "one-eye," or "cyclops." They are quick to anger, especially when taunted or insulted. They are known to look for conflict and rarely show restraint. All Abyssins have the ability to heal quickly and to regenerate body parts, which leads to their belief that change is impossible, and as such they rarely stray from their home world. Abyssins dislike blaster fire and space-battles.

== Aleena ==
The Aleena are a short-bodied alien race native to the planet Aleen. They are characterized by their thick bodies and short limbs. They waddle when they walk, and are ungainly to look upon. Their heads are dominated by a long, thin plate of body which extends back from the skull, and their faces are flat. Two little eyes sit over a wide mouth which is filled with short, sharp teeth. Individuals are bred for their color variation, another way they avoid becoming prey. As a people, the Aleena have a strong warrior tradition. They possess exceptional reflexes as well as a fast metabolism which allows them to convert food into energy very rapidly in order to escape predators (such as sagcatchers) on their harsh home planet.

== Amani ==
The Amani are large, mainly arboreal aliens descended from planarian worms. They have long arms and a broad body, and their heads resemble that of a hooded cobra, but with a humanoid face. They hail from Maridun, where they prefer to travel in the trees, using their arms to swing among branches, but their shapes also allow them to curl into a ball and roll at incredible speeds. They organize into small, technologically primitive tribes that form war parties to fight the other tribes for territory. They have a cultural aversion to advanced technology introduced by the “off-worlder” or greater outside galactic civilization, and they generally prefer to fight with traditional spears and arrows. They are also popular as guards and bodyguards with the criminal elements of the galaxy. The Hutts are the biggest users of their services.

An Amanin can be seen briefly in Return of the Jedi. This alien serves as one of Jabba's guards in his palace and can be seen guarding one of Jabba's most prized possessions: Han Solo encased in carbonite. He is yellow with brown/green stripes and carries a long spear decorated with severed humanoid heads.

== Amaran ==
Amarans are fox-like sentients from the planet Amar which are heavily involved in the animal trade.

== Annoo dat Prime ==
The Annoo dat Prime is a four eyed, reptilian race hailing from the planet Annoo. The average height for an Annoo dat Prime is 8 feet (2.4 m). They tend to have rough, yellow scaled skin, with a small row of spines running down their backs and to the end of their short tails. They have four eyes, the upper two red and the lower two blue. The only Annoo dat Prime to ever be named or shown in expanded universe was the separatist General Ashaar Khorda. He appears in the Zam Wessel comic book, and subsequently dies following a plot to destroy Coruscant.

== Anomid ==
Anomid are humanoid, with gray hair and silver-blue eyes, and are native to the Yablari system. They communicate largely by using their own sign language. Boba Fett impersonated one in Rebel Dawn, part of the Han Solo trilogy of books. They are reportedly one of the more social species in the Star Wars galaxy.

== Ansionian ==
Ansionians are tall and thin. In addition to possessing a single nostril, they have relatively large eyes. The Ansionians hail from the planet of Ansion, and are known to be lovers of peace. Many Ansionians, called Alwari, live in tribal factions on the plains, away from the human settler-created cities. They are relatively nomadic and resent technology and the fact that it has ruined the face of their planet, but not to such an extent so as to cause violence.

== Anzati ==
These aliens appear similar to humans, the only differences being two prehensile probosci and a somewhat enlarged nose and surrounding facial structure. People of their species are rare, but they have a lifespan that can last for over a millennium. They tend to behave like vampires. The proboscises lie coiled and hidden in pockets within the cheeks and can be extended to drain a victim's 'luck' or 'soup' by piercing the brain through the nose. The Anzati are capable of mild telepathic control to render their victims paralyzed, and are assassins of legendary skill. The Jedi hunting mercenary Aurra Sing was trained by these assassins, as was the Jedi Master Tholme. Their planet of origin has never been verified, as all sent to investigate the planet suspected to be Anzat are never seen again. Two more famous Anzati were Dannik Jerriko, an assassin of great renown who hunted Han Solo, as written in Tales from the Mos Eisley Cantina. (Dannik Jerriko appears in person and actually demonstrates killing someone in Galaxy of Fear: Ghost of the Jedi) and the dark Jedi Nikkos Tyris.

== Aqualish ==
The most notorious of the Aqualish, Ponda Baba, suffered a severed arm at the hands of Obi-Wan Kenobi during a fight in the Mos Eisley cantina. The species has a reputation for being nasty, crude and aggressive, and generally pursue careers as mercenaries, bounty hunters and pirates. The Aqualish are divided into three different subspecies, the Aquala, the Ualaq and the Quara; these subspecies are differentiated by their hand structure. The Aqualish hail from the planet Ando. Their home planet is almost entirely covered by water; the only hospitable land consists of a few rocky outcroppings and swamp-covered islands. Aqualish flesh does not cauterize, nor does their blood coagulate, when wounded by a lightsaber. This can be seen in Star Wars Episode IV: A New Hope. Aqualish also have the tendencies to involve themselves in the spice trade.

== Arcona ==
Arcona are scale-less, reptilian humanoids. They have flat, anvil-shaped heads, with clear, marble-like eyes, and skin tone that ranges from mahogany to ebony. The Arcona's weaknesses have been exploited in the past; off-worlders used to trade water for mineral rights, but discovered their easy addiction to salt. Traders then imported large amounts of the mineral before communities outlawed the dealings. When the species has become addicted to salt, their eyes turn from green to gold. To survive an Arconan must periodically consume a substance known as dactyl. Salt increases an Arconan's need for this substance by a hundredfold. A well known Arcona was the Jedi Knight Izal Waz (Troy Denning's Star Wars: The New Jedi Order - Star By Star).

== Argazdan ==
Argazdans were a green-skinned humanoid species native to the planet Argazda.

One individual named Raygar was first featured in the Ewoks episode "Battle for the Sunstar".

== Aruzan ==
Aruzans, the inhabitants of Aruza, are humanoids with faintly blue skin and dark, nearly black hair. They have the ability to share their memories and emotions with one another by means of cybernetic implants During the time of Imperial subjugation, the Aruzans hired Dengar to assassinate General Kritkeen, who was the planetary commander.

== Askajian ==
These near-human aliens appear to be bulky, flabby creatures and are often dismissed as such. The bulk is actually stored water, a genetic trait acquired from evolving on a desert planet. When needed, the Askajian can draw on this water to survive, in which case they become dramatically thinner as the stored water is used up. Askajian tend to have multiple children per pregnancy, and thus as an evolutionary trait females of the species have three sets of breasts. Jabba the Hutt had an Askajian dancer in his palace on Tatooine, whom he kept at near-maximum water weight as he found her bulk attractive.

== Azumel ==
Azumels are a species that has gray, mottled brown, or tan colored skin. They also have six eyestalks. They made an appearance in Solo: A Star Wars Story.

== Balosar ==
Balosars are a sentient humanoid species from the world Basolar, which is a ruined planet, located in the Core Worlds section of the galaxy. Balosars appear to be sickly compared to common galactic species due to the heavy pollution of the Balosar homeworld. Balosars commonly are labeled as depressed, weak-willed, sarcastic, and cynical.

The Balosar Elan Sleazebaggano appears in Attack of the Clones. He approaches Obi-Wan Kenobi, and asks Obi-Wan if he would like to buy some deathsticks. Obi-Wan quickly turns him away using a Jedi mind trick, convincing him to go home and rethink his life.

The Balosar species are resistant to balo mushroom extract, also known as death sticks.

== Bando Gora ==
Shown in the game Star Wars: Bounty Hunter, the Bando Gora are the Star Wars version of the living dead. These souls of ancient warriors were brought back by the dark Jedi Komari Vosa.

They are found all over the galaxy, but originated on one of the moons of Bogden. These beings appear as dark, humanoid creatures, wrapped in black. They answer only to their master. The Bando Gora were the personal army of Vosa, and she used them in crippling attacks on some of the galaxy's top industries. In the end, the Bando Gora, along with Vosa, were destroyed by Jango Fett. Fett was secretly hired by Count Dooku to kill Vosa and the Bando Gora. Dooku wanted to test Fett to see if he had the high ability needed to be the template for the Republic clone army.

Although Vosa died, the Bando Gora did not die with her. Whoever does the proper sacrifice on the moon of Bogden will gain control of what's left of the Bando Gora.

== Barabel ==
The Barabel are a reptilian species that appears human, save for the scales covering their bodies and long tails. They are extremely strong and have long pointed teeth. They are one of the most feared aliens in the Star Wars Galaxy. They will eat almost any kind of meat providing it is or was recently alive. They take great thrill in hunting for their food. However, they show an immense amount of respect to the Jedi, and seem to value their wisdom above all else. This is because in their distant history, a wandering Jedi had settled a bloody dispute between two major clans over prime hunting grounds. A trio of Barabels accompanied Anakin Solo and a handful of other young Jedi, on a mission to destroy the "Queen" voxyn on a Yuuzhan Vong planet in Denning's Star by Star. Two of the Barabel on the mission perished, as did Anakin Solo. Two of the most famous Barabels are Saba Sebatyne and her son Tesar Sebatyne.

The Barabel were well known for their aggressiveness, and for never apologizing. Apologizing was an unknown concept for the Barabel, and being apologized to was considered mildly insulting by the Barabel. Apologizing to a Barabel usually made the situation worse.

== Besalisk ==
Besalisks are a race of four-armed humanoids from the icy planet of Ojom, though female Besalisks can have up to eight arms. Besalisks evolved from large flightless avians, though they are often mistaken for a reptilian species. They are bulky, fleshy beings able to survive for long periods without food or water. They tend to have a bony crest surrounded by short feathers, and a wide mouth with an elastic sack dangling from it. Because of their size, they are often seen as gluttonous, though this is a misconception. Another misconception is that they are nervous or in poor shape because they sweat profusely, though this is in fact due to the normally freezing temperatures on their home planet. The average Besalisk stands approximately 1.8 meters tall. Their language consists of grunts, growls, and barks, and their written language has a simple alphabet and short words, although Besalisks can speak Galactic Basic with ease.

Although Besalisks have contributed very little to the galaxy in terms of resources and technology, they are sociable, gregarious, and keen-witted, are found easily in the galactic community and can readily use what other species have to offer. During the reign of the Galactic Empire, Besalisks narrowly avoided slavery by calling in favors with various influential underworld connections. Many are still working off their freedom, especially besalisks that were foolish or desperate enough to seek aid from the Hutts. Besalisks have never sought official representation in the Galactic Senate and generally seem content to go about their business and leave Galactic affairs to politicians and bureaucrats of other species. Communities on their homeworld are sparsely populated, and few offworld colonies of Besalisks are found in any era.

One Besalisk, Dexter Jettster, is the owner of Dex's Diner in Coco Town, Coruscant and a good friend of Obi-Wan Kenobi, is seen in Attack of the Clones. Dexter helped Kenobi by telling him where a poisoned dart had come from, eventually leading to the discovery of the clone army on Kamino.

Besalisk Jedi Master Pong Krell served during the Clone Wars. In combat, he would take advantage of his six-limbed anatomy by wielding two double-bladed lightsabers, often to devastating effect. Pong Krell turned on his clone troopers in the battle of Umbara, sending them unknowingly to kill other clone troopers. His plan was to prove to count Dooku that he was ready to join him.

== Bith ==
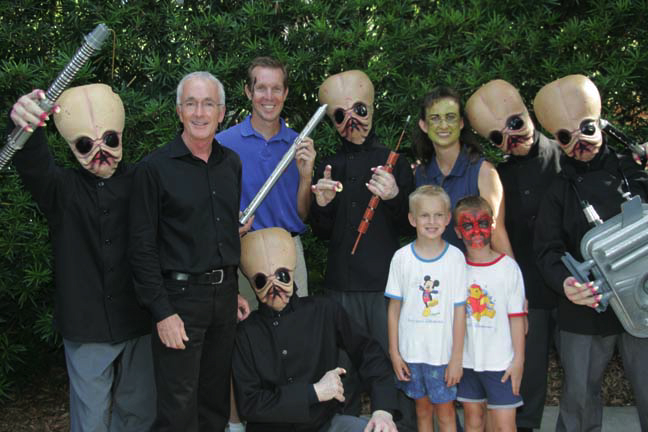
Fans pose with Figrin D'an and the Modal Nodes at Disney Weekend.

Bith are native to the planet Clak'Dor VII. They have pale skin, large heads and eyes, and long fingers. Their mouths are hidden within three folds of moist skin, and their ears are capable of hearing frequencies far beyond those that most species can perceive. In some cases, Bith have been known to hear high-powered communication broadcast signals without using artificial equipment. Due to their highly tuned audio senses, Bith are often sought after as musicians across the galaxy. They also have great reputations as starship mechanics and scientists. Figrin D'an and the Modal Nodes are a Bith band seen playing music in the Mos Eisley Cantina. Darth Tenebrous, the Sith master of Darth Plagueis, was a Bith. Bith are also able to store large amounts of information in a very short period of time and retain that information in an undamaged binary state for short periods of time. They are considered mature at ten years of age and are known for long life.

== Blarina ==
The Blarina are an alien race introduced in the 2015 novelization of Star Wars: The Force Awakens by Alan Dean Foster. In the novel, X-wing fighter pilot Poe Dameron, stranded on the desert planet Jakku, is aided by the Blarina scavenger Naka Iit. Naka is described as being humanoid but scaly, a little more than half the height of a human, with a short, wide snout and gold-hued, slit eyes. He has claws and sharp teeth, and more teeth than humans have. Poe notes that the Blarina are "not especially strong, but ... very, very quick". Naka also mentions a Blarina merchant named Ohn Gos in the Jakku settlement of Blowback Town.

== Blood Carver ==
Blood Carvers are thin humanoids, golden in skin color, with three jointed arms and legs. Their nose is two separate flaps that contain both the senses of smell and of hearing.

Their society hates the idea of wealth and money and sees little to no use for it, basing their hierarchy on honor rather than money.

== Boltrunian ==
Boltrunians are a large and muscular reptilian near-human species with hairless heads, craggy faces, wide noses, and heavy brow ridges. Boltrunians could live to be over 700 years old. Well-known Boltrunians included Warto and the Dark Jedi Maw. Often, a Boltrunian would be mistaken for a Trandoshan.

== B'omarr monks ==
The B'omarr are not actually a species; rather they were an order of monks whose monastery eventually became Jabba the Hutt's Palace. They believe that cutting themselves off from civilization and all corporeal distractions leads to enlightenment and to that end undergo surgery to separate their brains from their bodies and continue their existence as a brain in a jar. They learn to communicate telepathically and by controlling technology attuned to their abilities. On the rare occasions when they need to move, they are able to use a spider-like walking apparatus. The B'omarr were still in Jabba's Palace at the time it appears in Return of the Jedi, and indeed, as C-3PO enters Jabba's palace, a spiderwalker can be seen. The monks inhabit the lower part of the palace and allow the various smugglers and crime lords like Jabba to use the upper levels, as long as they add another section to the lower levels for use by the B'omarr. When the current ruler of the upper levels is deposed they drive out the stragglers and add the brains of those who do not leave to their order. The infamous Bib Fortuna himself eventually (unwillingly) became a monk, as he had sought power through the monks' teachings. The animated film "The Clone Wars" establishes that the B'omarr order maintained monasteries on several planets. The facility on Teth, built on the top of a steep mountain, served as the hideout for Separatist forces who kidnapped Jabba the Hutt's son Rotta. The architecture was very similar to Jabba's palace. According to dialogue in the film, many of the abandoned monasteries are used as hideouts for smugglers.

== Bothan ==
In Star Wars Legends, Bothans hail from the industrial Mid Rim planet of Bothawui, though they also populate various colony worlds like Kothlis and Torolis. Most Bothans stand about 5–6 ft. tall. They have tapered pointed ears, elongated heads, and a very few from both sexes have beards. They are manipulative, crafty, suspicious, curious by nature, loyal, brave, and very smart. They developed their technology to travel among the stars millennia ago and are longstanding members of the galactic civilization.

Bothans place high value on information, viewing it as both an economic resources and strategic asset. Their culture has traditionally favored intelligence gathering and negotiations over direct economic, political, or military confrontation, on the grounds that open conflict can damage the objectives sought by all parties. As a result,, espionage has become a prominent Bothan profession, and information services are among their principal exports. The Bothan spynet is described as the galaxy's largest independent intelligence gathering network. Its services are used by influential individuals and organizations across the galaxy. Critics have argued that Bothans use information to gain political or financial advantage, while others consider access to the spynet valuable enough to maintain working relationships with Bothan agents.

The most renowned Bothans from Chaos Squadron are Jorec Thebe, Giddic Ryne and Relluf Xander, the three surviving Bothans who provided the Death Star plans in Return of the Jedi. Another Bothan is Borsk Fey'lya, who later became leader of the New Republic and sacrificed himself during the Yuuzhan Vong invasion. Fey'lya led a campaign against Admiral Ackbar in the Thrawn books.

In canon, the only mention of Bothans are by Mon Mothma in Return of the Jedi. Many Bothans died to bring the rebellion information about the Death Star II in Return of the Jedi.

== Bouncer ==
Bouncers are furry green floating orbs with thin black tails that live on the planet Ruusan. They also appear in the novels and audio dramatizations of Star Wars: Dark Forces upon the planet Sulon. Morgan Katarn, father of soon-to-be Jedi Master Kyle Katarn, discovers the creatures in the Valley of the Jedi in Ruusan, naming them appropriately. Bouncers apparently move with the wind, lifting flaps of skin to use them as sails to guide their bodies. They use rocks and other formations to bounce them high, gliding them through the air for travel. Bouncers are said to be attuned with the Force and can communicate with those who can manipulate it. They can also become hostile when exposed to massive amounts of energy from the dark side of the Force, such as Lord Kaan's thought bomb. They communicate with other species by speaking into their minds. They can attempt to predict the future.

== Caamasi ==
The Caamasi are a species of golden-furred humanoids known for their calm wisdom and pacifist nature. Strongly loyal to the Old Republic, many Caamasi died when their homeworld of Caamas was devastated by the Galactic Empire.

== Caskadag ==
Caskadags are a sentient species hailing from a desert planet. They had two stomachs and were long-lived, with member Anglang Lehet preparing to retire after 102 years of work, as he considered himself old despite believing he had decades of life left in his future.

A notable Caskadag family was the wealthy Bool family led by its patriarch Kedron Bool, who owned the Bool Corporation during the New Republic era. His youngest son Kestar was deemed unsuitable for a position of power within the family, and set out to make a name for himself as a racer in the Galactic League founded by Darius Pax and usurping his position with his family's support.

== Cathar ==
The Cathar are cat-like humanoids from the planet Cathar. Famous Cathar are the Jedi Juhani and Crado and Sylvar, pupils of the ancient Jedi Master Vodo Siosk-Baas. The party member character Juhani from Star Wars: Knights of the Old Republic belongs to the Cathar race (though she's actually part of a subspecies of the Cathar that was notable for appearing less catlike than the baseline Cathar species). Aric Jorgan, a companion character to the Trooper class in the MMORPG Star Wars: The Old Republic, is also a member of the Cathar species. This race is also now playable in game.

== Celegian ==
The Celegians are a species of intelligent scyphozoans native to Celegia, appearing as floating brains trailing a cluster of prehensile tentacles. The species are renowned for their wisdom and intellect, and they often travel far seeking to expand their knowledge.

Celegians evolved from ocean-dwelling ancestors, and developed a natural form of levitation similar to an organic repulsorlift generator. Their homeworld has a cyanogen atmosphere, which is lethal to most species but necessary for the Celegains, for whom oxygen is toxic. Because of this, when they travel offworld, they are normally encased in a chamber filled with cyanogen; this causes them to appear as if afloat in a watery brine. Because of their fragile form and life support requirements, they are rarely encountered.

== Cerean ==
Cereans are a species with long cone-like heads (because they have an extra heart on top of their dual brains) that hail from the planet Cerea. One example is Jedi Master Ki-Adi-Mundi. They have a very low number of males compared to females, therefore Master Mundi was allowed to have one bond wife (Shea) and several honor wives even though he was a Jedi. Cereans sport binary brains within their large heads, and although their coordination is generally somewhat impaired relative to humans or other species, they make up for it with incredible mind control and thought processes.

== Chadra-Fan ==
The Chadra-Fan are short, furry mammalianoids with bat-like faces and flap-like ears. A famous Chadra-Fan was Tekli of the New Jedi Order, who later became a healer for the Jedi. Her race was often received well because they had what many Star Wars authors referred to as adorable features.

== Chalactan ==
The Chalactans are a near-human race native to Chalacta. One example is Depa Billaba.

== Chagrian ==
Chagrians are blue skinned humanoids with horns and lethorns. One example is Mas Amedda, who is the Speaker of the Galactic Senate. The Chagrian homeworld's twin suns produce vast amounts of radiation that would kill a normal human. Chagrians evolved their blue skins to filter the radiation.

== Chikarri ==
A Chikarri was a seldom-seen squirrel-like sentient from the planet Plagen. Like real squirrels, they were good climbers. They were known to be fascinated with technology, though they took care to make sure none harmed their homeworld.

== Chironian ==
The Chironian were a centaur-like race from Chiron. The only known character of this species is Lusa, a force-sensitive introduced in the novel The Crystal Star. They've been known to express their emotions by the movement of their legs (stomping when impatient, tapping when excited).

== Chiss ==
In the Star Wars universe, the Chiss are a humanoid species with pale blue skin, blue-black hair, and glowing red eyes, their native language is Cheunh. First introduced to the Star Wars expanded universe in Timothy Zahn's Thrawn trilogy through his arch villain Grand Admiral Thrawn, the Chiss have since developed into a popular species amongst fans and other Expanded Universe authors.

Another notable Chiss was Sev'rance Tann, a Dark Acolyte serving Count Dooku and a general in the Armed Forces of the Confederacy of Independent Systems (believed to have actually preceded General Grievous as Supreme Commander of the Droid Armies).

In the Expanded Universe, Csilla is identified as the homeworld of the Chiss. Csilla is a cold world of glaciers and snowy wastes located deep within Chiss Space, and serves as the capital of the Chiss Empire.

The Chiss are noted for their lack of reliance on droids, or any kind of artificial intelligence. Baron Soontir Fel attempted to change this during the Yuuzhan Vong invasion, by introducing self-thinking spacecraft. Any progress on this is more or less unknown.

While their history has been marked by nearly continual warfare and conquest of other worlds, the Chiss are generally not personally violent: indeed, one of the major laws of their society (the breaking of which resulted in Thrawn's exile from their space) is that the Chiss cannot launch preemptive attacks, even against obvious aggressors.

Chiss are a playable species in Star Wars: The Old Republic. Noted for their typical alliance to the Empire, they can initially be Agents or Bounty Hunters and unlocked to be played as a Republic class. They are primarily Imperial Agents as in game characters and stationed on the ice planets of Hoth and Ilum.

== Chistori ==
The Chistori are a lizard like humanoid race. They resemble bipedal lizards with a prominent muzzle, an impressive line of teeth, and thick scales. Few things are known in connection with the reptilians known as the Chistori because they are a secretive race. Even the Jedi Files do not know their native world. Due to their reptilian nature, they are cold blooded. If a Chistori is exposed to cold temperatures for a prolonged period of time they will undoubtedly die. One example of a Chistori would be Desann.

== Clawdite ==
Clawdites are a genetic offspring of the Zolanders, the dominant species on planet Zolan. When the Zolanders discovered that their Moon had increased its radioactive emissions, they tried to unleash a gene in the Clawdites skin cells to activate natural protection against radiation. The results created a new species, Clawdites, which were metamorphs. Clawdites can change their appearance, if keeping body mass as a constant and not retaining the same aspect for a long time. The Clawdites then joined the Sith Empire as part of the Storm Trooper Army, a group of Clawdites with advanced shapeshifting skills.

Zam Wessel, the bounty hunter working with Jango Fett on Coruscant in Attack of the Clones, is the most famous example of a Clawdite in Star Wars. Clawdites are also referred to as Changelings because of their ability to shape-shift.

== Codru-Ji ==
Codru-Ji are four-armed humanoids with pointed ears who, while not xenophobic in the typical sense, have not yet integrated themselves into galactic society. They guard their society and their young with equal ferocity, which can be surprising since an immature Codru-Ji appears almost nothing like a mature Codru-Ji, and in fact can be mistaken for a pet. Immature Codru-Ji, also known as Wyrwulf, are small, six-limbed lupine creatures who enter a chrysalis phase in puberty and emerge a mature Codru-Ji.

== Colicoid ==
Colicoids are a bug-like race from Colla IV. They founded the Colicoid Creation Nest, a company that manufactured the three-legged droidekas that resembled and were able to curl into balls and roll around like them. Their other products included droid tri-fighters, Trident-class assault ships, and Pistoeka sabotage droids, or buzz droids. They tended to be both ruthless and greedy in terms of personality.

== Coway ==
The Coway appear in the 1978 novel Splinter of the Mind's Eye, by Alan Dean Foster. The Coway are a fur-covered humanoid species that are native to the planet Mimban, of the Circarpous Major system. Coways live deep underground, and have a strong aversion to surface-dwellers. Coways have small eyes, but are able to see in the dark due to their infrared vision. Additionally, they are able to eat foods normally poisonous to humans because of their more tolerant digestive system. They wear simple, primitive clothing.

The underground world of the Coway can be reached through deep shafts known as Thrella Shafts (named after the Thrella, an extinct species known for their numerous tunnels and wells). Often these have side-tunnels that lead to Coway dwellings. The tribal government of the Coway consists of a triumvirate who make the major decisions for the tribe.

== Cragmoloid ==
The Cragmoloids are a race of elephant-like people from the planet Ankus who are often hunted for their ivory, and consider removing their tusks a form of embarrassment. They are short-tempered, direct, proud and social, and hate being alone.

== Crocin ==
The Crocin are a race of crocodilian people native to the planet Croce that were originally introduced in Solo: A Star Wars Story via the character Karjj. They have short builds, teeth protruding from their mouths, and are unused to sunlight due to living in cities built into caverns. When traveling to warmer and brighter climates, they wear goggles to protect their sensitive eyes from sunlight.

One notable Crocin named Biddy Blas appears in Star Wars: Galactic Racer as a competitor in the Galactic League racing organization after the fall of the Empire at the Battle of Jakku as his fourth attempt at stardom after Huttball, modeling, and jatz. He displayed poor sportsmanship ranging from taunting his opponents and sabotaging his opponents' vehicles with explosives under the guise of an alleged Crocin gift-giving tradition, but also exhibited a softer side towards his mother who he supports with his winnings and hopes to make proud one day by earning enough fame to appear on a cereal box.

== Dashade ==
In the new Jedi Order books the Dashade people are almost exterminated by the Yuuzhan Vong; but Anakin Solo steps in, and saves one particular tribe before beginning a terrible journey back to the main settlement whilst being pursued by Yuuzhan Vong warriors.

Another famous Dashade is Khem Val, a companion character for the Sith Inquisitor in Star Wars: The Old Republic.

== Defel ==
The Defel were introduced through the presence of Arleil Schous in the Mos Eisley cantina of Star Wars Episode IV: A New Hope.

== Devaronian ==
Devaronians were one of the first species in the galaxy to develop interstellar travel, and the males of the species have been common sights in spaceports throughout the galaxy for thousands of years. A distinguishing physical feature of Devaronians are the devil-like horns emerging from the tops of their heads. Devaronian males are driven by an urge to wander, usually taking the first opportunity to move on from one place to another. As such, they are often found traveling the galaxy as tramp freighter captains and scouts. Female Devaronians, on the other hand, are content to remain in a single location, and, as such, raise the young and run the government of Devaron. The males send as much money as they can manage back to their home world to support their families, but otherwise hardly ever return once they have begun to travel the stars. The females are content with this arrangement, as they tend to view the restless males as disruptive to home life.

One Devaronian, Kardue'sai'Malloc (going by the name of Labria) was seen smiling and seated at the bar in the cantina scene of A New Hope. He had one of the galaxy's highest bounties posted by the Rebel Alliance for his war crimes at the Devaronian city of Montellian Serat, and was eventually captured by Boba Fett. Unlike most Devaronian males, Labria had a rare mutation that gave him two sets of teeth, a normal male set and a female set that he could retract at will. Such mutants were prized as scouts, as they could travel afar and survive on food normally inedible to males.

Another notable Devaronian is Vizago from the Star Wars television series, Rebels. Vizago is the captain of the Broken Horn.

== Dizonite ==
Dizonites are an extinct sentient species from the Outer Rim Territories moon Dizon Fray mentioned in Andor. At some point prior to 5 BBY during the Imperial era, the Dizonites resisted the Empire's plans to build a refueling center, and all present on their homeworld were massacred by Imperial forces, with the genocide broadcast and recorded as proof of their mission. It was discovered that their choral dying screams caused severe emotional distress to its listeners, leading Imperial interrogator Doctor Gorst to curate the recordings to use screams of what he believed to be Dizonite children as a torture method. He used them on Bix Caleen to interrogate her for information regarding Cassian Andor. Over the next two years, Gorst's torture methods using Dizonite screams were expanded into their own program, with a facility on Coruscant donated to it. He was subject to his own torture methods by Bix as part of an assassination mission and her revenge plot before she and Cassian destroy the facility with him in it, putting an end to the program.

== Dowutin ==
Dowutins are an alien species featured in legends and other films. They have horns on their chins and have hooved feet. They are usually very large. Examples include: Grummgar the Hunter, who is seen in Maz Kanata's castle in The Force Awakens, and the Ninth Sister, who is an Inquisitor featured in Star Wars comics and in the Star Wars: Jedi video game series.

== Drach'nam ==
Drach'nam appear in the short story "Jade Solitare" in the compilation Tales from the New Republic. They are a very brutal and violent race employing neuronic whips (a whip with a conductive lash which sends hundreds of volts through the victim's body), and long, 15 inch, serrated knives. Their home planet is very diverse on the surface ranging from very hot to extremely cold. The planet rotates extremely slowly - one day is about two hundred earth years - so as a result all of the Drach'nam cities are dark and dank tunnels.

The only famous Drach'nam is Chay Praysh, who is famous for employing female slaves in his palace. Mara Jade once became a slave to his brutal regime to rescue Ja Bardrins daughter Sansia.

== Dressellian ==
Dressellians are wrinkled humanoids from the planet Dressel. Dressellians believe fiercely in an individual's freedom and will often find it difficult to work in groups, even so many formed a freedom fighting force during the time of the Empire to fight for their right to live as they wanted. Dresselians treasure freedom above everything else. Dressellians use slugthrowers (rifles and pistols firing metal projectiles) instead of blasters.

Several Dressellians appear briefly on screen in Return of the Jedi, attending the Rebel Alliance meeting on board the Home One star cruiser, just prior to the Battle of Endor. An action figure of a Dressellian dubbed "Prune Face" was produced for Kenner's Star Wars action figure line in 1984.

== Droch ==
Source of the mysterious Death Seed plague, the drochs are an insect race from Nam Chorios that start off life as non-sentient but can become sentient by absorbing the life of victims. A droch can burrow under the skin of its intended victim and drink their life while they sleep, or sometimes while they are awake. Their small size, great agility and fast reproductive cycle means that they can wipe out the population of a city in a matter of only a few days. As the drochs drink of sentient victim's life, they also absorb intelligence. Larger, "captain drochs" can absorb life through the smaller drochs without having to come into contact with the victims themselves. One mutated captain droch, named Dzym, lived to be 250 years old and grew to human size, able to disguise himself as a human and gaining sentience from absorbing intelligence for all that time.

== Drovian ==
Drovians are a tall and burly species from Nim Drovis with thick trunk-like legs that, like their arms, end in three sharp pincers. The Drovians divided into two tribes, the Gopso'o and the Drovians, centuries ago, and have been at war with each other since. Nearly all Drovians are addicted to a narcotic called zwil; originally imported as a cake flavoring, the Drovians can absorb it directly into their systems through their breathing tubes.

== Dug ==
Dugs are shown in Star Wars: Bounty Hunter as an enemy on the planet Malastare. Dugs have been known to be greedy, and are most of the time looking for a deal on any product.

In Attack of the Clones a Dug is seen in one of the airspeeders during the speeder chase sequence and another is seen in Dexter's diner. One infamous Dug is Sebulba, a deeply arrogant podracer and Anakin's main competitor in the Boonta Eve Classic on Tatooine in The Phantom Menace. Decades later during the New Republic era after the fall of the Galactic Empire, Sebulba mellowed somewhat due to a combination of his old age and prior loss to Anakin. He recognized the talent in the new generation of racers, and was willing to help Shade fly his backup podracer to defeat Kestar Bool and allow their mechanic Hibi to modify it to allow the non-Force sensitive human to handle it, while also calling in favors from other retired podracers to privately train Shade. More Dugs can be seen in the Star Wars TV show, The Clone Wars.

== Dulok ==
Duloks are a green-colored furry species of Endor and are biologically related to Ewoks, though they tend to act more like Tusken Raiders of Tatooine. They first appeared in the Ewoks series, and one makes an appearance on Coruscant in Clone Wars.

== Duros ==
Duros are hairless beings with blue or green skin and large red eyes, said to be among the first spacefaring humanoid species, including humans. They are known for their superior astronavigational skills. Their homeworld is Duro, which is in the galactic core. Two Duros can be seen in the Mos Eisley Cantina in the 1977 film Star Wars. Cad Bane, a Duro on the Cartoon Network show The Clone Wars, is a professional bounty hunter. Duros have also appeared in a few Star Wars games, including Knights of the Old Republic and Knights of the Old Republic II: The Sith Lords.

The Duros have not set foot on their world since the Empire polluted it with weapons factories. Instead they live in large orbital cities surrounding the planet.

Duros are related to the Neimoidians, the aliens in charge of the Trade Federation in the prequel films, because many years before the Republic, the Duros colonized the planet Neimoidia, and thus the Neimoidians, a newer "version" of Duros, were born. Ironically the two races differed in temperament: Duros were normally seen as adventurous, while Neimoidians were mostly skittish. The Duros consider the Neimoidians to be cowardly and take offense at being mistaken by other beings for a Neimoidian. Duros are also known for their great story-telling skills because of the many places that they have visited during their travels throughout the galaxy: their preferred form of address is "Traveller", as shown in The Paradise Snare. Their planet was remade by the Yuuzhan Vong during the war into a bio-shipyard for the Vong's living creations.

== Echani ==
The Echani are a mysterious race of well taught fighters, whose most prominent appearance was in Star Wars: Knights of the Old Republic II: The Sith Lords. Five Echani Handmaiden sisters reside with Jedi Master Atris at her academy at the polar ice cap on Telos IV. These Echani were trained by Atris to construct barriers in their minds in order to resist Force-based powers. The Echani race possess natural martial art skill and wear light armor in battle, although they prefer to wear very little when training to restrict their movements less. The Echani maidens were often used to hunt down rogue Jedi and subdue them for the Order. Human in appearance, they often have leucistic skin and hair and closely resemble their parents, and therefore their siblings. As long as they have the same parents, Echani siblings are identical in appearance.

The best known of the Echani in the Star Wars universe was Brianna, the last of Atris' Handmaidens. She served with her Mistress on Telos IV, until the Jedi Exile arrived. After speaking with the Exile, she stowed away on board his ship, the Ebon Hawk. Eventually, it is revealed that her mother was a Jedi Knight and she herself starts on the path of the Jedi. This fact is the reason that Brianna looks different from her sisters - she does not share the same mother. This story depended on the player of the game choosing a male character. If the player chose a female character, the above story would not occur as so.

It is known that the Echani held a traditional rivalry with the Mandalorians. Echani and Mandalorians both saw each other as worthy opponents, therefore causing a war between them to prove whose skills were the better.

Due to the combat training of the Echani on a daily level, their bones become tougher, making them more durable. A version of the Echani style of unarmed combat is taught to members of Palpatine's Imperial Guard and Sith guard. This style has been adapted to be more brutal and efficient and less flashy. Echani were often seen on snowy/cold planets such as Hoth and Eshan. They made their bases underground since they would have been made out of durable materials.

Though not much is known about their aging process it is presumed that they age at the same rate of a human and their life expectancy is around one hundred years.

== Elomin ==
The Elomin are tall, demon-like thin humanoids with pointed ears and four horns. They live on the surface of the planet Elom. As a society, the Elomin strove to find order in all things, and worked to create order where it didn't exist. So when they discovered that another species, the Eloms, shared the same planet with them, most Elomin refused to acknowledge that their underground brethren even existed.

== Epicanthix ==
The Epicanthix are tall, muscular, near-humans native to the planet Panatha. They were known as warriors, having conquered many bordering planets such as Bunduki. They live longer than humans, with a life-span of around 130 years. They possess a rare genetic immunity to Force assisted mental tricks, influence, domination and mind reading. Although Epicanthix appeared very similar to baseline human, they were distinct enough that they could be recognized by sight, as in the case of Epicanthix Imperial Agent Ula Vii, who was so recognized by a pair of Imperials and ridiculed for his non-Human ancestry.

== Er'Kit ==
Er'Kit are usually skinny and grayish-blue, with long ears. The only well-known one is Ody Mandrell. Er'Kit inhabit the desert planet Er'Kit, for which they were named. One can be seen in The Phantom Menace during the pod race.

== Evocii ==
The Evocii are a primitive humanoid race from Nal Hutta, formerly known as Evocar.

== Ewok ==
Ewoks are a primitive tribal species from the forest moon of Endor. They are approximately half the size of humans and covered with fur. The Ewoks are best known for their aid to the Rebel mission to remove the deflector shield protecting the Second Death Star known as the battle of Endor. Some would humorously argue that the Ewoks are responsible for the downfall of the Empire, because without them, the Rebel fleet would have been completely destroyed. While peaceful by nature, they are extremely territorial and have been known to fight ferociously in protection of their society. Though they are known as Ewoks, the species name itself was never mentioned in Return of the Jedi. They can also be found in the Lucasfilm movies Caravan of Courage and The Battle for Endor.

== See also ==
- List of Star Wars species (F–J)
- List of Star Wars species (K–O)
- List of Star Wars species (P–T)
- List of Star Wars species (U–Z)
