= List of Star Wars books =

Star Wars is an American epic space-opera media franchise, centered on a film series created by George Lucas that includes Star Wars (1977), The Empire Strikes Back (1980), and Return of the Jedi (1983). The series depicts the adventures of various characters "a long time ago in a galaxy far, far away". Many derivative Star Wars works have been produced in conjunction with, between, and after the original trilogy of films, and later installments. This body of work was collectively known as the Star Wars Expanded Universe for decades.

In October 2012, The Walt Disney Company acquired Lucasfilm for $4.06 billion. In April 2014, Lucasfilm rebranded the Expanded Universe material as Star Wars Legends and declared it non-canon to the Star Wars franchise. The company's focus would be shifted towards a restructured Star Wars canon based on new material. The first new canon adult novel was Star Wars: A New Dawn by John Jackson Miller, published in September 2014.

This is a list of original novels, novel adaptations, original junior novels, junior novel adaptations, young readers, and short stories in the Star Wars franchise. This list does not include journals, graphic novels or comic books, which can be found in the list of Star Wars comic books. Reference books and roleplaying gamebooks can be found at the list of Star Wars reference books.

Fictional timeline abbreviations

- BBY : Before the Battle of Yavin, prior to the culminating event of the original 1977 Star Wars film
- ABY : After the Battle of Yavin, events following the original 1977 Star Wars film

Maturity rating abbreviations

- AA : Adult audiences.
- YA : Young readers; typically shorter than an adult novel, and accessible for younger audiences.
- EB : eBook; originally released as digital short stories, but may be included with other novels.

== Film, television and video game adaptations ==
The novelizations offer alternate takes on the events of the movies, with many including discarded or slightly altered plotlines. Those published before 25 April 2014 are considered Legends like all other media.

=== Legends ===
==== Films ====
Timeline	Original Work	(Sub)title	Author	Release date	Maturity	Audiobook	Note
32 BBY	Episode I – The Phantom Menace	The Phantom Menace	Terry Brooks	1999-04-21	AA	Yes	
32 BBY	Episode I – The Phantom Menace	The Phantom Menace	Patricia Wrede	1999-05-03	YA	No	
32 BBY	Episode I – The Phantom Menace	Journal series: Anakin Skywalker	Todd Strasser	1999	YA	No	(Note: Novelization from a specific character's perspective)
32 BBY	Episode I – The Phantom Menace	Journal series: Darth Maul	Jude Watson	1999	YA	No	(Note: Novelization from a specific character's perspective)
32 BBY	Episode I – The Phantom Menace	Journal series: Queen Amidala	Jude Watson	1999	YA	No	(Note: Novelization from a specific character's perspective)
0 BBY–0 ABY	The Phantom of Menace	Star Wars Part the First	Ian Doescher	2013-07-02	AA	Yes	(Note: Part of the William Shakespeare's Star Wars series) (Note: Collected in William Shakespeare's The Phantom of Menace: Star Wars Part the First)
22 BBY	Episode II – Attack of the Clones	Attack of the Clones	R.A. Salvatore	2002-04-23	AA	Yes	
22 BBY	Episode II – Attack of the Clones	Attack of the Clones	Patricia Wrede	2002-04-23	YA	No	
0 BBY–0 ABY	The Clone Army Attacketh	Star Wars Part the Second	Ian Doescher	2013-07-02	AA	Yes	(Note: Collected in William Shakespeare's The Clone Army Attacketh: Star Wars Part the Second)
22 BBY	The Clone Wars film	The Clone Wars	Karen Traviss	2008-07-26	AA	Yes	
22 BBY	The Clone Wars film	The Clone Wars	Tracey West	2008-07-26	YA	No	
0 BBY–0 ABY	Tragedy of the Sith's Revenge: Star Wars Part the Third	Star Wars Part the Third	Ian Doescher	2013-07-02	AA	Yes	(Note: Collected in William Shakespeare's Tragedy of the Sith's Revenge: Star Wars Part the Third)
19 BBY	Episode III – Revenge of the Sith	Revenge of the Sith	Matthew Stover	2005-04-02	AA	Yes	
19 BBY	Episode III – Revenge of the Sith	Revenge of the Sith	Patricia Wrede	2005-04-02	YA	No	
0 BBY–0 ABY	Episode IV – A New Hope	From the Adventures of Luke Skywalker	Alan Dean Foster	1976-11-12	AA	Yes	
0 BBY–0 ABY	Episode IV – A New Hope	A New Hope	Ryder Windham	2004-10-01	YA	No	
0 BBY–0 ABY	Episode IV – A New Hope	Star Wars: Verily, A New Hope	Ian Doescher	2013-07-02	AA	Yes	(Note: Collected in William Shakespeare's The Star Wars Trilogy: The Royal Box Set)
3 ABY	Episode V – The Empire Strikes Back	The Empire Strikes Back	Donald F. Glut	1980-04-12	AA	Yes	
3 ABY	Episode V – The Empire Strikes Back	The Empire Strikes Back	Ryder Windham	2004-10-01	YA	No	
3 ABY	Episode V – The Empire Strikes Back	The Empire Striketh Back: Star Wars Part the Fifth	Ian Doescher	2014-03-18	AA	Yes	
4 ABY	Episode VI – Return of the Jedi	Return of the Jedi	James Kahn	1983-05-12	AA	Yes	
4 ABY	Episode VI – Return of the Jedi	Return of the Jedi	Ryder Windham	2004-10-01	YA	No	
4 ABY	Episode VI – Return of the Jedi	The Jedi Doth Return: Star Wars Part the Sixth	Ian Doescher	2014-07-01	AA	No	

==== Video games ====
Timeline	Original Work	(Sub)title	Author	Release date	Maturity	Audiobook
3–2 BBY	The Force Unleashed	The Force Unleashed	Sean Williams	2008	AA	(Note: Abridged audiobook only)
1 BBY	The Force Unleashed II	The Force Unleashed II	Sean Williams	2010	AA	Yes
1 BBY	Dark Forces	Soldier for the Empire	William C. Dietz	1997	AA	(Note: Only as a full cast audio drama)
5 ABY	Jedi Knight: Dark Forces II	Rebel Agent	William C. Dietz	1998	AA	Maybe
5 ABY	Jedi Knight: Dark Forces II	Jedi Knight	William C. Dietz	1998	AA	Maybe

=== Canon ===
==== Films ====
Timeline	Original Work	(Sub)title	Author	Release date	Maturity	Audiobook	Note
32 BBY	Episode I – The Phantom Menace	The Phantom of Menace: Star Wars Part the First	Ian Doescher	2015-04-07	AA	No	
22 BBY	Episode II – Attack of the Clones	The Clone Army Attacketh: Star Wars Part the Second	Ian Doescher	2015-07-07	AA	No	
19 BBY	Episode III – Revenge of the Sith	Tragedy of the Sith's Revenge: Star Wars Part the Third	Ian Doescher	2015-09-08	AA	No	
13–10 BBY	Solo: A Star Wars Story	Expanded Edition	Mur Lafferty	2018-09-04	AA	Yes	
13–10 BBY	Solo: A Star Wars Story	A Junior Novel	Joe Schreiber	2018-09-11	YA	No	
0 BBY	Rogue One: A Star Wars Story	Rogue One	Alexander Freed	2016-12-16	AA	Yes	
0 BBY	Rogue One: A Star Wars Story	A Junior Novel	Matt Forbeck	2016-12-16	YA	No	
0 BBY–0 ABY	Episode IV – A New Hope	A New Hope	Ryder Windham	2017-05-04	YA	No	(Note: Edited version of 2004 Legends junior novelization)
0 BBY–0 ABY	Episode IV – A New Hope	The Princess, the Scoundrel, and the Farm Boy	Alexandra Bracken	2015-09-22	YA	Yes	
3 ABY	Episode V – The Empire Strikes Back	The Empire Strikes Back	Ryder Windham	2017-05-04	YA	No	
3 ABY	Episode V – The Empire Strikes Back	So You Want to Be a Jedi?	Adam Gidwitz	2015-09-22	YA	Yes	
4 ABY	Episode VI – Return of the Jedi	Return of the Jedi	Ryder Windham	2017-05-04	YA	No	
4 ABY	Episode VI – Return of the Jedi	Beware the Power of the Dark Side!	Tom Angleberger	2015-09-22	YA	Yes	
34 ABY	Episode VII – The Force Awakens	The Force Awakens	Alan Dean Foster	2015-12-18	AA	Yes	
34 ABY	Episode VII – The Force Awakens	A Junior Novel	Michael Kogge	2016-02-16	YA	Yes	
34 ABY	Episode VII – The Force Awakens	Rey's Story	Elizabeth Schaefer	2016-02-16	YA	No	
34 ABY	Episode VII – The Force Awakens	Finn's Story	Jesse J. Holland	2016-09-13	YA	No	
34 ABY	Episode VII – The Force Awakens	The Force Doth Awaken: Star Wars Part the Seventh	Ian Doescher	2017-10-03	AA	No	
34 ABY	Episode VIII – The Last Jedi	Expanded Edition	Jason Fry	2018-03-06	AA	Yes	
34 ABY	Episode VIII – The Last Jedi	A Junior Novel	Michael Kogge	2018-03-06	YA	Yes	
34 ABY	Episode VIII – The Last Jedi	Jedi the Last: Star Wars Part the Eighth	Ian Doescher	2018-07-10	AA	No	
35 ABY	Episode IX – The Rise of Skywalker	Expanded Edition	Rae Carson	2020-03-17	AA	Yes	
35 ABY	Episode IX – The Rise of Skywalker	A Junior Novel	Michael Kogge	2020-04-16	YA	Yes	
35 ABY	Episode IX – The Rise of Skywalker	The Merry Rise of Skywalker: Star Wars Part the Ninth	Ian Doescher	2020-07-28	AA	No	
32 BBY–34 ABY	Episode I – Episode VIII	The Skywalker Saga	Delilah S. Dawson	2019	YA	No	

==== Television shows ====
Timeline	Original Work	(Sub)title	Adapted material	Author	Release date	Maturity	Audiobook
32 BBY–4 ABY	Galaxy of Adventures	Galaxy of Adventures		Meredith Rusu	2019	YA	No
21 BBY–34 ABY	Forces of Destiny	Daring Adventures: Volume 1	Forces of Destiny Season 1, Episodes 1–2, 6 and 9	Emma Carlson Berne	2017-08	YA	Yes
21 BBY–3 ABY	Forces of Destiny	Daring Adventures: Volume 2	Forces of Destiny Season 1, Episodes 4–5 and 7	Emma Carlson Berne	2017-10	YA	Yes
5 BBY	Rebels	Rise of the Rebels	Rebels prequel shorts	Michael Kogge	2014-08	YA	No
5 BBY	Rebels	The Rebellion Begins	Rebels Season 1, Episodes 1–2	Michael Kogge	2014-10	YA	No
5 BBY	Rebels	Droids in Distress	Rebels Season 1, Episodes 1–3	Michael Kogge	2014-11	YA	No
4 BBY	Rebels	Ezra's Duel with Danger	Rebels Season 1, Episodes 6–8	Michael Kogge	2015-03	YA	No
4 BBY	Rebels	Battle to the End	Rebels Season 1, Episodes 11–13	Michael Kogge	2015-06	YA	No
3 BBY–4 ABY	Forces of Destiny	Daring Adventures: The Leia Chronicles	Forces of Destiny Season 1, Episodes 3, 8 and 14	Emma Carlson Berne	2018-01	YA	Yes
9 ABY	The Mandalorian	Junior Novel	The Mandalorian Season 1	Joe Schreiber	2021-01-05	YA	No
9 ABY	The Mandalorian	Season 2 Junior Novel	The Mandalorian Season 2	Joe Schreiber	2022-01-04	YA	No
9 ABY	The Book of Boba Fett	Junior Novel	The Book of Boba Fett Season 1	Joe Schreiber	2023-01-03	YA	Yes
34 ABY	Forces of Destiny	Daring Adventures: The Rey Chronicles	Forces of Destiny Season 1, Episodes 10 and 15 and Season 2, Episode 5	Emma Carlson Berne	2018-03	YA	Yes

== Disney canon stories (2014–present) ==
Since 2014, the official Star Wars canon includes all of the movie episodes, The Clone Wars film and the television shows Star Wars: The Clone Wars, Star Wars Rebels, and Star Wars Resistance, as well as any books, comics, film, television, and video games published after April 2014.

=== Adult and young reader books ===
Timeline	Series	Title	Author	Release date	Maturity	Audiobook	Note
382 BBY	The High Republic Phase II	Convergence	Zoraida Córdova	2022-11-22	AA	Yes	
382 BBY	The High Republic Phase II	Quest for the Hidden City	George Mann	2022-11-01	YA	Yes	
382 BBY	The High Republic Phase II	Path of Deceit	Tessa Gratton & Justina Ireland	2022-10-04	YA	Yes	
382 BBY	The High Republic Phase II	The Battle of Jedha	George Mann	2023-02-14	AA	Yes	(Note: Script book of audio drama)
382 BBY	The High Republic Phase II	Cataclysm	Lydia Kang	2023-04-04	AA	Yes	
382 BBY	The High Republic Phase II	Path of Vengeance	Cavan Scott	2023-05-02	YA	Yes	
382 BBY	The High Republic Phase II	Quest for Planet X	Tessa Gratton	2023-04-04	YA	Yes	
233–232 BBY	Young Jedi Adventures		Michael Olson	2023–2025	TV	N/A	
232 BBY	The High Republic Phase I	Into the Dark	Claudia Gray	2021-02-02	YA	Yes	
232 BBY	The High Republic Phase I	Light of the Jedi	Charles Soule	2021-01-05	AA	Yes	
232 BBY	The High Republic Phase I	A Test of Courage	Justina Ireland	2021-01-05	YA	Yes	
231 BBY	The High Republic Phase I	The Rising Storm	Cavan Scott	2021-06-29	AA	Yes	
231 BBY	The High Republic Phase I	Race to Crashpoint Tower	Daniel Jose Older	2021-06-29	YA	Yes	
231 BBY	The High Republic Phase I	Out of the Shadows	Justina Ireland	2021-07-27	YA	Yes	
231 BBY	The High Republic Phase I	Tempest Runner	Cavan Scott	2022-03-01	AA	Yes	
230 BBY	The High Republic Phase I	Mission to Disaster	Justina Ireland	2022-01-04	YA	Yes	
230 BBY	The High Republic Phase I	Midnight Horizon	Daniel José Older	2022-02-01	YA	Yes	
230 BBY	The High Republic Phase I	The Fallen Star	Claudia Gray	2022-01-04	AA	Yes	
229 BBY	The High Republic Phase III	The Eye of Darkness	George Mann	2023-11-14	AA	Yes	
229 BBY	The High Republic Phase III	Escape from Valo	Daniel Jose Older & Alyssa Wong	2024-01-30	YA	Yes	
228 BBY	The High Republic Phase III	Defy the Storm	Tessa Gratton & Justina Ireland	2024-03-05	YA	Yes	
228 BBY	The High Republic Phase III	Temptation of the Force	Tessa Gratton	2024-06-11	AA	Yes	
228 BBY	The High Republic Phase III	Tears of the Nameless	George Mann	2024-09-24	YA	Yes	
228 BBY	The High Republic Phase III	Beware the Nameless	Zoraida Cordova	2024-08-27	YA	Yes	
228 BBY	The High Republic Phase III	Tempest Breaker	Cavan Scott	2025-05-13	AA	Yes	
228 BBY	The High Republic Phase III	Trials of the Jedi	Charles Soule	2025-06-17	AA	Yes	
228 BBY	The High Republic Phase III	Into the Light	Claudia Gray	2025-04-01	YA	Yes	
228 BBY	The High Republic Phase III	A Valiant Vow	Justina Ireland	2025-05-06	YA	Yes	
152 BBY	The Acolyte	Wayseeker	Justina Ireland	2025-05-06	AA	Yes	
136 BBY	The Acolyte	The Crystal Crown	Tessa Gratton	2025-07-29	YA	Yes	
132 BBY	The Acolyte		Leslye Headland	2024	TV	N/A	
41 BBY	Padawan		Kiersten White	2022-07-26	YA	Yes	
40 BBY	Master and Apprentice		Claudia Gray	2019-04-16	AA	Yes	
33 BBY	The Living Force		John Jackson Miller	2024-04-09	AA	Yes	
32 BBY (Note: Epilogue set in 0 BBY)	Padmé	Queen's Peril	E.K. Johnston	2020-06-02	YA	Yes	
32 BBY	Episode I – The Phantom Menace		George Lucas	1999-05-19	Movie	Yes	
32 BBY	Mace Windu: The Glass Abyss		Steven Barnes	2024-10-15	AA	Yes	
28 BBY	Padmé	Queen's Shadow	E.K. Johnston	2019-03-05	YA	Yes	
26 BBY	Choose Your Destiny	An Obi-Wan and Anakin Adventure	Cavan Scott	2019-03-19	YA	Yes	
23 BBY (Note: Flashbacks set in ~100 BBY)	Dooku: Jedi Lost		Cavan Scott	2019-04-30	AA	Yes	
22 BBY	Episode II – Attack of the Clones		George Lucas	2002-05-16	Movie	Yes	
22 BBY	Padmé	Queen's Hope	E.K. Johnston	2022-04-05	YA	Yes	
22-14 BBY	Inquisitor: Rise of the Red Blade		Delilah S. Dawson	2023-07-18	AA	Yes	
22 BBY	Brotherhood		Mike Chen	2022-05-10	AA	Yes	
22 BBY	The Clone Wars (film)		Henry Gilroy & Steven Melching & Scott Murphy	2008-08-14	Movie	N/A	
22–19 BBY	The Clone Wars (TV series)		George Lucas	2008–2020	TV	N/A	
21–17 BBY	Catalyst: A Rogue One Novel		James Luceno	2016-11-15	AA	Yes	
19 BBY (Note: Flashbacks set in 39 BBY)	Thrawn Ascendancy	Chaos Rising	Timothy Zahn	2020-09-01	AA	Yes	
19 BBY	Dark Disciple		Christie Golden	2015-07-07	AA	Yes	
19 BBY	Episode III – Revenge of the Sith		George Lucas	2005-05-19	Movie	Yes	
19 BBY	Master of Evil		Adam Christopher	2025-11-11	AA	Yes	
19 BBY	Reign of the Empire	The Mask of Fear	Alexander Freed	2025-02-25	AA	Yes	
19–18 BBY	The Bad Batch		Dave Filoni	2021–2024	TV	N/A	
18 BBY	The Bad Batch	Sanctuary	Lamar Giles	2025-08-05	AA	Yes	
18 BBY	Adventures in Wild Space	The Escape	Cavan Scott	2016-02-25	YA	Yes	
18 BBY	Adventures in Wild Space	The Snare	Cavan Scott	2016-02-25	YA	Yes	
18 BBY	Adventures in Wild Space	The Nest	Tom Huddleston	2016-02-25	YA	Yes	
18 BBY	Adventures in Wild Space	The Heist	Cavan Scott	2016-02-30	YA	Yes	
18 BBY	Adventures in Wild Space	The Darkness	Tom Huddleston	2016-02-30	YA	Yes	
18 BBY	Adventures in Wild Space	The Cold	Cavan Scott	2017-03-09	YA	Yes	
18 BBY	Adventures in Wild Space	The Rescue	Tom Huddleston	2017-05-04	YA	Yes	
18 BBY	Thrawn Ascendancy	Greater Good	Timothy Zahn	2021-04-27	AA	Yes	
18 BBY (Note: Flashbacks set from 39–19 BBY)	Thrawn Ascendancy	Lesser Evil	Timothy Zahn	2021-11-16	AA	Yes	
18 BBY	Ahsoka		E.K. Johnston	2016-10-11	YA	Yes	(Note: Builds on the television series Star Wars: The Clone Wars; was later partially adapted in The Clone Wars and Tales of the Jedi)
17 BBY	Maul: Shadow Lord		Dave Filoni	2026	TV	N/A	
15–2 BBY	Thrawn Imperial	Thrawn	Timothy Zahn	2017-04-11	AA	Yes	
14 BBY	Lords of the Sith		Paul S. Kemp	2015-04-28	AA	Yes	
14 BBY	Tarkin		James Luceno	2014-11-04	AA	Yes	
14 BBY	Jedi: Fallen Order		Aaron Contreras & Chris Avellone	2019-11-15	Game	N/A	
13–0 BBY	Rebel Rising		Beth Revis	2017-05-02	YA	Yes	
13 BBY	Most Wanted		Rae Carson	2018-05-25	YA	Yes	
12 BBY	Jedi: Battle Scars		Sam Maggs	2023-03-07	AA	Yes	(Note: Builds on the video game Star Wars Jedi: Survivor (2023))
11 BBY	Lando's Luck		Justina Ireland	2018-10-02	YA	Yes	(Note: Part of the Flight of the Falcon publishing campaign)
11 BBY	A New Dawn		John Jackson Miller	2014-09-02	AA	Yes	(Note: Builds on the television series Star Wars Rebels)
13-10 BBY	Crimson Climb		E.K. Johnston	2023-10-10	YA	Yes	
19-10 BBY	Outlaws	Low Red Moon	Mike Chen	2026-02-03	AA	Yes	
13–10 BBY	Solo: A Star Wars Story		Lawrence Kasdan & Jon Kasdan	2018-05-25	Movie	N/A	
9 BBY	Obi-Wan Kenobi		Joby Harold	2022	TV	N/A	
9 BBY	Jedi: Survivor		Aaron Contreras & Danny Homan & Pete Stewart & Cheyenne Morrin	2023-04-28	Game	N/A	
8 BBY	Choose Your Destiny	A Han & Chewie Adventure	Cavan Scott	2018-04-17	YA	No	
6 BBY	Reign of the Empire	Edge of the Abyss	Rebecca Roanhorse	2026-09-14	AA		
6 BBY–5 ABY	Servants of the Empire	Edge of the Galaxy	Jason Fry	2014-10-21	YA	No	
5–0 BBY	Andor		Tony Gilroy	2022–2025	TV	N/A	
5 BBY	Rebels	Ezra's Gamble	Ryder Windham	2014-08-05	YA	No	
5–1 BBY	Rebels		Simon Kinberg & Dave Filoni & Carrie Beck	2014–2018	TV	N/A	
5 BBY	Servants of the Empire	Rebel in the Ranks	Jason Fry	2015-03-03	YA	No	(Note: Partial adaptation of Star Wars Rebels Season 1, Episode 4)
4 BBY	Servants of the Empire	Imperial Justice	Jason Fry	2015-07-07	YA	No	
4 BBY	Servants of the Empire	The Secret Academy	Jason Fry	2015-10-06	YA	No	
3 BBY	Leia, Princess of Alderaan		Claudia Gray	2017-09-01	YA	Yes	(Note: Part of the Journey to Star Wars: The Last Jedi promotional campaign)
2 BBY	Thrawn Imperial	Alliances	Timothy Zahn	2018-07-24	AA	Yes	
1 BBY	Thrawn Imperial	Treason	Timothy Zahn	2019-07-23	AA	Yes	
1 BBY	The Mighty Chewbacca in the Forest of Fear!		Tom Angleberger	2018-05-25	YA	Yes	
1 BBY	Guardians of the Whills		Greg Rucka	2017-05-02	YA	No	
c. 1 BBY	Reign of the Empire	From the Ashes	Fran Wilde	2027-08-10	AA		
0 BBY	Rogue One: A Star Wars Story		John Knoll & Gary Whitta	2016-12-16	Movie	N/A	
0 BBY–0 ABY	Episode IV – A New Hope		George Lucas	1977-05-25	Movie	N/A	
0 BBY–0 ABY (Note: Takes place partially concurrently with Episode IV – A New Hope)	Battlefront II: Inferno Squad		Christie Golden	2017-07-25	AA	Yes	(Note: Builds on the video game Star Wars Battlefront II (2017))
0 ABY (Note: Prologue and epilogue set in 34 ABY)	Smuggler's Run		Greg Rucka	2015-09-04	YA	Yes	(Note: Part of the Journey to Star Wars: The Force Awakens promotional campaign)
0 ABY	Princess of the Rebellion		Claudia Gray	2027-05-04	YA		
0 ABY	Heir to the Jedi		Kevin Hearne	2015-03-03	AA	Yes	
0 ABY (Note: Prologue and epilogue set in 34 ABY)	The Weapon of a Jedi		Jason Fry	2015-09-04	YA	Yes	
0 ABY	Choose Your Destiny	A Luke & Leia Adventure	Cavan Scott	2018-10-02	YA	No	
0 ABY	Doctor Aphra		Sarah Kuhn	2021-04-06	AA	Yes	
c. 1 ABY	Hiding from the Dark		Kiersten White	2026-09-01	YA		
3 ABY	Episode V – The Empire Strikes Back		George Lucas	1980-05-06	Movie	N/A	
3 ABY (Note: Flashbacks set in 6 BBY, 4 BBY, 0 BBY and 0 ABY)	Battlefront: Twilight Company		Alexander Freed	2015-11-03	AA	Yes	(Note: Builds on the video game Star Wars Battlefront (2015))
3 ABY	Outlaws		Navid Khavari	2024-08-30	Game	N/A	
4 ABY (Note: Prologue and epilogue set in 34 ABY)	Moving Target		Cecil Castellucci & Jason Fry	2015-11-03	YA	Yes	
4 ABY	Episode VI – Return of the Jedi		George Lucas	1983-05-25	Movie	N/A	
4 ABY	The Princess and the Scoundrel		Beth Revis	2022-08-16	AA	Yes	
4 ABY	Twin Crossroads		Beth Revis	2027-04-06	AA		
4 ABY	Alphabet Squadron	Alphabet Squadron	Alexander Freed	2019-06-11	AA	Yes	
4 ABY	Aftermath	Aftermath	Chuck Wendig	2015-09-04	AA	Yes	
4 ABY	Squadrons		Joanna Berry	2020-10-02	Game	N/A	
5 ABY	Alphabet Squadron	Shadow Fall	Alexander Freed	2020-06-23	AA	Yes	
5 ABY (Note: Prologue and epilogue set in 35 BBY)	Aftermath	Life Debt	Chuck Wendig	2016-07-12	AA	Yes	
5 ABY	Alphabet Squadron	Victory's Price	Alexander Freed	2021-03-02	AA	Yes	
5 ABY (Note: Prelude takes place concurrently to Episode VI – Return of the Jedi)	Aftermath	Empire's End	Chuck Wendig	2017-02-21	AA	Yes	
4–5 ABY	Battlefront II		Walt Williams & Mitch Dyer	2017-11-17	Game	N/A	
6 BBY–5 ABY (Note: Prologue set in 11 ABY)	Lost Stars		Claudia Gray	2015-09-04	YA	Yes	
7 ABY (Note: Flashbacks set in 8 BBY and 3 BBY)	Last Shot		Daniel José Older	2018-04-17	AA	Yes	
9 ABY	Hunters: Battle for the Arena		Mark Oshiro	2023-03-07	YA	Yes	(Note: Builds on the video game Star Wars: Hunters (2023))
9–10 ABY	The Mandalorian		Jon Favreau	2019–2023	TV	N/A	
9 ABY	The Book of Boba Fett		Jon Favreau	2021–2022	TV	N/A	
c. 10 ABY	Skeleton Crew		Jon Watts & Christopher Ford	2024–2025	TV	N/A	
c. 10 ABY	Ahsoka		Dave Filoni	2023–2027	TV	N/A	
c. 10 ABY	The Mandalorian and Grogu		Jon Favreau & Dave Filoni & Noah Kloor	2026-05-22	Movie	N/A	
18 ABY	Poe Dameron: Free Fall		Alex Segura	2020-08-04	YA	Yes	
21 ABY	Shadow of the Sith		Adam Christopher	2022-06-28	AA	Yes	
28 ABY	Bloodline		Claudia Gray	2016-05-03	AA	Yes	
31–32 ABY	Force Collector		Kevin Shinick	2019-10-04	YA	Yes	(Note: Part of the Journey to Star Wars: The Rise of Skywalker promotional campaign)
33 ABY	Eyes Like Stars		Ashley Poston	2026-07-21	YA	Yes	
31–34 ABY	Before the Awakening		Greg Rucka	2015-12-18	YA	Yes	
34–35 ABY	Resistance		Dave Filoni	2018–2020	TV	N/A	
34 ABY	Join the Resistance	Join the Resistance	Ben Acker & Ben Blacker	2017-03-07	YA	Yes	
34 ABY	Join the Resistance	Escape from Vodran	Ben Acker & Ben Blacker	2017-10-03	YA	Yes	
34 ABY	Phasma		Delilah S. Dawson	2017-09-01	AA	Yes	
34 ABY	Episode VII – The Force Awakens		Lawrence Kasdan & J. J. Abrams & Michael Arndt	2015-12-14	Movie	Yes	
34 ABY (Note: Takes place concurrently with Episode VII – The Force Awakens)	Join the Resistance	Attack on Starkiller Base	Ben Acker & Ben Blacker	2018-07-31	YA	Yes	
34 ABY (Note: Takes place partially concurrently with Episode VII – The Force Awakens)	The Last Jedi: Cobalt Squadron		Elizabeth Wein	2017-12-15	YA	Yes	
34 ABY	Galaxy's Edge	Black Spire	Delilah S. Dawson	2019-09-03	AA	Yes	
34 ABY	Episode VIII – The Last Jedi		Rian Johnson	2017-12-15	Movie	Yes	
34 ABY	The Legends of Luke Skywalker		Ken Liu	2017-10-31	YA	Yes	
34 ABY	Resistance Reborn		Rebecca Roanhorse	2019-11-05	AA	Yes	
34 ABY	Choose Your Destiny	A Finn & Poe Adventure	Cavan Scott	2019-10-04	YA	No	
34 ABY	Spark of the Resistance		Justina Ireland	2019-10-04	YA	Yes	
34 ABY	Pirate's Price		Lou Anders	2019-01-08	YA	Yes	
34 ABY	Galaxy's Edge	A Crash of Fate	Zoraida Córdova	2019-08-06	YA	Yes	
c. 35 ABY	Legacy		Madeleine Roux	2026-07-28	AA	Yes	
35 ABY	Episode IX – The Rise of Skywalker		J. J. Abrams & Chris Terrio	2019-12-20	Movie	Yes	
35 ABY	The Last Order		Kwame Mbalia	2025-10-21	YA	Yes	
35 ABY	The Rise and Fall of the Galactic Empire		Dr. Chris Kempshall	2024-07-09	AA		
c. 35 ABY	Star Pilots		Dr. Chris Kempshall	2026-10-06	AA		
c. 40 ABY	Starfighter		Jonathan Tropper	2027-05-28	Movie		

=== Short stories ===
==== Star Wars Insider (2014–present) ====
Since 2014, various short stories have been published in Star Wars Insider. Some of these stories were later reprinted in the paperback editions of various novels, or the hardcover Star Wars: The Fiction Collection compilation.

Timeline	Title	Issue number	Author	Release date	Note
4 ABY	Blade Squadron: Part 1	#149	David J. & Mark S. Williams	April 2014	
4 ABY	Blade Squadron: Part 2	#150	David J. & Mark S. Williams	June 2014	
0 ABY	One Thousand Levels Down	#151	Alexander Freed	July 2014	
10 BBY	The End of History	#154	Alexander Freed	December 2014	
0 ABY	Last Call at the Zero Angle	#156	Jason Fry	March 2015	
14 BBY	Orientation	#157	John Jackson Miller	April 2015	
4 BBY	Rebel Bluff	#158	Michael Kogge	June 2015	
20 BBY	Kindred Spirits	#159	Christie Golden	July 2015	
4 ABY	Blade Squadron: Zero Hour	#160	David J. & Mark S. Williams	September 2015	
3 ABY	Inbrief	#161	Janine K. Spendlove	November 2015	
34 ABY	Bait	#162	Alan Dean Foster	December 2015	
28 ABY	Scorched	#165	Delilah S. Dawson	May 2016	
11–1 BBY	TK-146275	#166	Sylvain Neuvel	June 2016	
5 ABY	Blade Squadron: Kuat	#168	Mark Williams & David Williams	September 2016	
4 ABY	Turning Point	#169	Jason Hugh	October 2016	
17 BBY	The Voice of the Empire	#170	Mur Lafferty	December 2016	
5 ABY	Blade Squadron: Jakku	#172	Mark Williams & David Williams	April 2017	
22 BBY	Galactic Tales: The Wesell Run	#209	S.T. Bende	March 2022	
22 - 19 BBY	Galactic Tales: Saber Truth	#210	Richard Dinnick	May 2022	
22 BBY	Galactic Tales: Inheritance	#211	George Mann	June 2022	
22 - 19 BBY	Galactic Tales: From The Shadows Come The Karn	#212	Rodney Barnes	August 2022	
4 ABY	Galactic Tales: Shockwave	#220	Alexander Freed	August 2023	
4 ABY	Galactic Tales: Lost in the Woods	#221	S.T. Bende	September 2023	
4 ABY	Galactic Tales: Valnir and Laizhu	#222	Richard Dinnick	October 2023	

==== The Rise of the Empire (Released October 2015) ====
Timeline	Title	Author	Note
14 BBY	Mercy Mission	Melissa Scott	
12 BBY	Bottleneck	John Jackson Miller	
4 ABY	The Levers of Power	Jason Fry	

==== The Perfect Weapon ====
Timeline	Title	Author	Release date	Note
34 ABY	The Perfect Weapon	Delilah S. Dawson	November 2015	This story is part of the Journey to Star Wars: The Force Awakens promotional campaign. Printed in the paperback edition of the Star Wars: The Force Awakens novelization.

==== Tales from a Galaxy Far, Far Away: Aliens ====
The collection Tales from a Galaxy Far, Far Away: Aliens is part of the Journey to Star Wars: The Force Awakens promotional campaign. Some stories were originally published as individual e-books, and later collected with other new stories. However, they were all published together as a book called Star Wars: Tales From a Galaxy Far, Far Away

Timeline	Title	Author	Release date	Note
34 ABY	All Creatures Great and Small	Landry Q. Walker	November 2015	
34 ABY	High Noon on Jakku	Landry Q. Walker	November 2015	
31 ABY; flashbacks to 19 BBY	The Crimson Corsair and the Lost Treasure of Count Dooku	Landry Q. Walker	November 2015	
34 ABY	The Face of Evil	Landry Q. Walker	November 2015	
Pre–32 BBY	A Recipe for Death	Landry Q. Walker	April 2016	
34 ABY	True Love	Landry Q. Walker	April 2016	

==== From a Certain Point of View (Released October 2017) ====
Timeline	Title	Author	Note
0 BBY	Raymus	Gary Whitta	
0 BBY	The Bucke	Christie Golden	
0 BBY	The Sith of Datawork	Ken Liu	
0 BBY	Stories in the Sand	Griffin McElroy	
0 BBY	Reirin	Sabaa Tahir	
0 BBY	The Red One	Rae Carson	
0 BBY	Rites	John Jackson Miller	
0 BBY	Master and Apprentice	Claudia Gray	
0 BBY	Beru Whitesun Lars	Meg Cabot	
0 BBY	The Luckless Rodian	Renee Ahdieh	
0 BBY	Not for Nothing	Mur Lafferty	
	We Don't Serve Their Kind Here	Chuck Wendig	
0 BBY	The Kloo Horn Cantina Caper	Kelly Sue DeConnick & Matt Fraction	
0 BBY	Added Muscle	Paul Dini	
0 BBY	You Owe Me a Ride	Zoraida Cordova	
0 BBY	The Secrets of Long Snoo	Delilah S. Dawson	
0 BBY	Born in the Storm	Daniel Jose Older	
0 BBY	Laina	Wil Wheaton	
0 BBY	Fully Operational	Beth Revis	
0 BBY	An Incident Report	Daniel M. Lavery	
0 BBY	Change of Heart	Elizabeth Wein	
0 BBY	Eclipse	Madeleine Roux	
0 BBY	Verge of Greatness	Pablo Hidalgo	
0 BBY	Far Too Remote	Jeffrey Brown	
0 BBY	The Trigger	Kieron Gillen	
0 BBY	Of MSE-6 and Men	Glen Weldon	
0 BBY	Bump	Ben Acker & Ben Blacker	
0 BBY	End of Watch	Adam Christopher	
0 BBY	The Baptist	Nnedi Okorafor	
0 BBY	Time of Death	Cavan Scott	
0 BBY	There Is Another	Gary D. Schmidt	
0 BBY	Palpatine	Ian Doescher	
0 BBY–0 ABY	Sparks	Paul S. Kemp	
0 BBY–0 ABY	Duty Roster	Jason Fry	
0 BBY–0 ABY	Desert Son	Pierce Brown	
0 BBY–0 ABY	Grounded	Greg Rucka	
0 BBY–0 ABY	Contingency Plan	Alexander Freed	
0 ABY	The Angle	Charles Soule	
0 ABY	By Whatever Sun	E.K. Johnston & Ashley Eckstein	
0 ABY	Whills	Tom Angleberger	

==== Canto Bight (Released December 2017) ====
Timeline	Title	Author	Note
34 ABY	Rules of the Game	Saladin Ahmed	
34 ABY	Hear Nothing, See Nothing, Say Nothing	Rae Carson	
34 ABY	The Wine in Dreams	Mira Grant	
34 ABY	The Ride	John Jackson Miller	

==== Black Spire: Return to a Shattered Planet ====
Timeline	Title	Author	Release date	Note
34 ABY	Black Spire: Return to a Shattered Planet	Delilah S. Dawson	June 2020	This story was printed in the paperback edition of the novel "Galaxy's Edge: Black Spire", also written by Dawson.

==== From a Certain Point of View: The Empire Strikes Back (Released November 2020) ====
Timeline	Title	Author	Note
3 ABY	Eyes of the Empire	Kiersten White	
3 ABY	Hunger	Mark Oshiro	
3 ABY	Ion Control	Emily Skrutskie	
3 ABY	A Good Kiss	C.B. Lee	
3 ABY	She Will Keep Them Warm	Delilah S. Dawson	
3 ABY	Heroes of the Rebellion	Amy Ratcliffe	
3 ABY	Rogue Two	Gary Whitta	
3 ABY	Kendal	Charles Yu	
3 ABY	Against All Odds	R.F. Kuang	
3 ABY	Beyond Hope	Michael Moreci	
3 ABY	The Truest Duty	Christie Golden	
3 ABY	A Naturalist on Hoth	Hank Green	
3 ABY	The Dragonsnake Saves R2-D2	Katie Cook	
3 ABY	For the Last Time	Beth Revis	
3 ABY	Rendevouz Point	Jason Fry	
3 ABY	The Final Order	Seth Dickinson	
3 ABY	Amara Kel's Rules for TIE Pilot Survival (Probably)	Django Wexler	
3 ABY	The First Lession	Jim Zub	
3 ABY	Disturbance	Mike Chen	
3 ABY	This Is No Cave	Catherynne M. Valente	
3 ABY	Lord Vader Will See You Now	John Jackson Miller	
3 ABY	Vergence	Tracy Deonn	
3 ABY	Tooth and Claw	Michael Kogge	
3 ABY	STET!	Daniel José Older	
3 ABY	Wait for It	Zoraida Córdova	
3 ABY	Standard Imperial Procedure	Sarwat Chadda	
3 ABY	There Is Always Another	Mackenzi Lee	
3 ABY	Fake It Till You Make It	Cavan Scott	
3 ABY	But What Does He Eat?	S.A. Chakraborty	
3 ABY	Beyond the Clouds	Lilliam Rivera	
3 ABY	No Time for Poetry	Austin Walker	
3 ABY	Bespin Escape	Martha Wells	
3 ABY	Faith in an Old Friend	Brittany N. Williams	
3 ABY	Due on Batuu	Rob Hart	
3 ABY	Into the Clouds	Karen Strong	
3 ABY	The Witness	Adam Christopher	
3 ABY	The Man Who Build Cloud City	Alexander Freed	
3 ABY	The Backup Backup Plan	Anne Toole	
3 ABY	Right-Hand Man	Lydia Kang	
3 ABY	The Whills Strike Back	Tom Angleberger	

==== Published Stories of Jedi and Sith (Released June 2022) ====
Short story anthology published by Disney Lucasfilm Press in June 2022.

Timeline	Title	Author	Note
	What a Jedi Makes	Michael Kogge	
	Resolve	Alex Segura	
	The Eye of the Beholder	Sarwat Chadda	
	A Jedi's Duty	Karen Strong	
	Worthless	Delilah S. Dawson	
	The Ghosts of Maul	Michael Moreci	
	Blood Moon Uprising	Vera Strange	
	Luke on the Bright Side	Sam Maggs	
	Masters	Tessa Gratton	
	Through the Turbulence	Roseanne A. Brown	

==== Star Wars Insider: The High Republic: Starlight Stories (December 2022) ====
Short story anthology published by Titan Comics in December 2022 collecting five stories originally published in Issues #199 to #208 of the Star Wars Insider magazine.

Timeline	Title	Author	Note
	Go Together	Charles Soule	
	First Duty	Cavan Scott	
	Hidden Danger	Justina Ireland	
	Past Mistakes	Cavan Scott	
	Shadows Remain	Justina Ireland	

==== From a Certain Point of View: Return of the Jedi (Released August 2023) ====
Timeline	Title	Author	Note
4 ABY	Any Work Worth Doing	Amal El-Mohtar	
4 ABY	Fancy Man	Phil Szostak	
4 ABY	The Key to Remembering	Olivia Chadha	
4 ABY	Fortuna Favors the Bold	Kwambe Mbalia	
4 ABY	Dune Sea Songs of Salt and Moonlight	Thea Guanzon	
4 ABY	The Plan	Saladin Ahmed	
4 ABY	Reputation	Tara Sim	
4 ABY	Kickback	K. Arsenault Rivera	
4 ABY	Everyone's a Critic	Sarah Glenn Marsh	
4 ABY	Satisfaction	Kristin Baver	
4 ABY	My Mouth Never Closes	Charlie Jane Anders	
4 ABY	Kernels and Husks	Jason Fry	
4 ABY	The Light That Falls	Akemi Dawn Bowman	
4 ABY	From a Certain Point of View	Alex Jennings	
4 ABY	No Contingency	Fran Wilde	
4 ABY	The Burden of Leadership	Danny Lore	
4 ABY	Gone to the Winner's Circle	Patricia A. Jackson	
4 ABY	One Normal Day	Mary Kenney	
4 ABY	Divine (?) Intervention	Paul Crilley	
4 ABY	The Buy-In	Suzanne Walker	
4 ABY	The Man Who Captured Luke Skywalker	Max Gladstone	
4 ABY	Ackbar	Jarrett Krosoczka	
4 ABY	Marieke Nijkamp	Marieke Nijkamp	
4 ABY	Ending Protocol	Hannah Whitten	
4 ABY	The Last Flight	Ali Hazelwood	
4 ABY	Twenty and Out	Lamar Giles	
4 ABY	The Ballad of Nanta	Sarah Kuhn	
4 ABY	Then Fall, Sidious	Olivie Blake	
4 ABY	Impact	Sean Williams	
4 ABY	Trooper Trouble	Laura Pohl	
4 ABY	To the Last	Dana Schwartz	
4 ABY	The Emperor's Red Guards	Gloria Chao	
4 ABY	Wolf Trap	Alyssa Wong	
4 ABY	The Extra Five Percent	M.K. England	
4 ABY	When Fire Marked the Sky	Emma Mieko Candon	
4 ABY	The Chronicler	Danielle Paige	
4 ABY	The Veteran	Adam Lance Garcia	
4 ABY	Brotherhood	Mike Chen	
4 ABY	The Steadfast Soldier	Adam Christopher	
4 ABY	Return of the Whills	Tom Angleberger	

==== Star Wars Insider: The High Republic: Tales of Enlightenment (April 2024) ====
Short story anthology published by Titan Comics in April 2024 collecting five stories originally published in Issues #213 to #219 of the Star Wars Insider magazine, all of which were written by George Mann. It also includes a completely new short story titled "Missing Pieces", also written by Mann.

Timeline	Title	Author	Note
382 BBY	New Prospects	George Mann	
382 BBY	A Different Perspective	George Mann	
382 BBY	The Unusual Suspect	George Mann	
382 BBY	No Such Thing as a Bad Customer	George Mann	
382 BBY	Last Orders	George Mann	
377 BBY	Missing Pieces	George Mann	

=== Children's books ===
Canon storybooks for younger readers that are shorter than a standard novel or young adult novel.

Timeline	Title	Author	Release date	Note
32 BBY-34 ABY	5-Minute Star Wars Stories	Various Authors	December 2015	
32 BBY-34 ABY	5-Minute Star Wars Stories Strike Back	Various Authors	December 2017	
32 BBY-19 BBY	The Prequel Trilogy Stories	Various Authors	December 2017	
32 BBY	The Phantom Menace Read-Along Storybook and CD	Elizabeth Schaefer	January 2017	
32 BBY	The Phantom Menace	Courtney Carbone	July 2015	
22 BBY	Attack of the Clones	Geof Smith	July 2015	
22 BBY	Attack of the Clones Read-Along Storybook and CD	Lucasfilm Book Group	February 2017	
21 BBY-34 ABY	Forces of Destiny: Tales of Hope & Courage	Elizabeth Schaefer	October 2017	
19 BBY	Revenge of the Sith	Geof Smith	July 2015	
19 BBY	Revenge of the Sith Read-Along Storybook and CD	Lucasfilm Book Group	March 2017	
5 BBY	Chopper Saves the Day	Elizabeth Schaefer	August 2014	
5 BBY	Sabine's Art Attack	Jennifer Heddle	February 2015	
5 BBY	Zeb to the Rescue	Michael Siglain	August 2014	
5 BBY	Ezra and the Pilot	Jennifer Heddle	August 2014	
5 BBY	Ezra's Wookiee Rescue	Meredith L. Rusu	October 2014	
5 BBY	The Secret Jedi: The Adventures of Kanan Jarrus: Rebel Leader	Ben Harper	February 2015	
5 BBY	A New Hero	Pablo Hidalgo	August 2014	
5 BBY	TIE Fighter Trouble	Brooke Vitale	March 2015	
5 BBY	The Inquisitor's Trap	Meredith L. Rusu	December 2014	
5 BBY	Hera's Phantom Flight	Elizabeth Schaefer	October 2015	
5 BBY	Kanan's Jedi Training	Elizabeth Schaefer	August 2015	
5 BBY	Always Bet on Chopper	Meredith L. Rusu	October 2015	
0 BBY	Rogue One Secret Mission	Jason Fry	March 2017	
0 BBY	Bounty Hunt	Katrina Pallant	April 2016	
0 BBY	Escape from Darth Vader	Michael Siglain	October 2014	
0 BBY	Trouble on Tatooine	Nate Millici	May 2017	
0 BBY	Trapped in the Death Star!	Michael Siglain	November 2016	
0 BBY	Death Star Battle	Michael Siglain	February 2016	
0 BBY-0 ABY	A New Hope	Geof Smith	July 2015	
0 BBY-0 ABY	A New Hope Read-Along Storybook and CD	Randy Thornton	February 2015	
0 BBY-0 ABY	The Rise of a Hero	Louise Simonson	May 2017	
0 BBY-4 ABY	The Adventures of Luke Skywalker, Jedi Knight	Tony DiTerlizzi	October 2014	
0 BBY-4 ABY	Star Wars in Pictures: The Original Trilogy	Ryder Windham	August 2015	
0 BBY-4 ABY	The Original Trilogy Stories	Various Authors	September 2015	
0 BBY-4 ABY	The Power of the Dark Side	Benjamin Harper	September 2015	
0 BBY-34 ABY	The Chewbacca Story	Benjamin Harper	August 2016	
0 BBY-34 ABY	A Leader Named Leia	Jennifer Heddle	September 2017	Part of the Journey to Star Wars: The Last Jedi promotional campaign.
0 ABY	Han and the Rebel Rescue	Nate Millici	May 2017	
0 ABY	Luke and the Lost Jedi Temple	Jason Fry	November 2016	
3 ABY	The Empire Strikes Back	Geof Smith	July 2015	
3 ABY	The Empire Strikes Back Read-Along Storybook and CD	Randy Thornton	May 2015	
3 ABY	AT-AT Attack!	Calliope Glass	November 2015	
3 ABY	Use the Force	Michael Siglain	April 2015	
4 ABY	Leia and the Great Island Escape	Jason Fry	December 2016	
4 ABY	Return of the Jedi	Geof Smith	July 2015	
4 ABY	Return of the Jedi Read-Along Storybook and CD	Randy Thornton	April 2015	
4 ABY	Rescue from Jabba's Palace	Michael Siglain	April 2015	
4 ABY	Ewoks Join the Fight	Michael Siglain	August 2015	
34 ABY	Poe and the Missing Ship	Nate Millici	January 2017	
34 ABY	The Force Awakens	Christopher Nicholas	April 2016	
34 ABY	The Force Awakens Storybook	Elizabeth Schaefer	April 2016	
34 ABY	The Force Awakens Read-Along Storybook & CD	Elizabeth Schaefer	April 2016	
34 ABY	Rey to the Rescue!	Lisa Stock	January 2017	
34 ABY	Finn & The First Order	Brian Rood	December 2015	
34 ABY	Rey Meets BB-8	Elizabeth Schaefer	December 2015	
34 ABY	Finn & Poe Team Up!	Nate Millici	June 2016	
34 ABY	Finn & Rey Escape!	Brian Rood	December 2015	
34 ABY	Han & Chewie Return!	Michael Siglain	December 2015	
34 ABY	Chaos at the Castle	Nate Millici	August 2016	
34 ABY	The Fight in the Forest	Nate Millici	January 2017	
34 ABY	The Force Awakens: New Adventures	David Fentiman	December 2015	
34 ABY	Finn's Mission	David Fentiman	June 2016	
34 ABY	The Adventures of BB-8	David Fentiman	June 2016	
34 ABY	BB-8 on the Run	Drew Daywalt	September 2017	
34 ABY	Lightsaber Rescue	Erin Rose Wage	December 2015	
34 ABY	Rolling with BB-8!	Benjamin Harper	February 2016	
34 ABY	Rey's Journey	Ella Patrick	December 2017	
34 ABY	Rose and Finn's Mission	Ella Patrick	December 2017	
34 ABY	Chewie and the Porgs	Kevin Shinick	December 2017	

In 2015, the original six Star Wars films were adapted as Little Golden Books. In 2017, A New Hope was also released as a Big Golden Book. Additionally, Solo: A Star Wars Story and the sequel trilogy were adapted. Many other original titles featuring scenes from throughout the saga have been released, including I Am a Padawan by Ashley Eckstein. An upcoming release will adapt The Mandalorian.

== Star Wars Legends stories (1976–2014) ==
This body of work represents the original Star Wars expanded universe, which was rebranded as Star Wars Legends and declared non-canon to the franchise in April 2014.

Beginning with the 1999 release of Star Wars: Episode I – The Phantom Menace, Lucasfilm has divided its titles by fictional "era" with symbols designating such:

Publishing eras

- Before the Republic: stories taking place before 25,000 BBY.
- Old Republic: stories taking place between 25,053 BBY to 1,000 BBY.
- Rise of the Empire: stories taking place between 1000 BBY to 0 BBY.
- Rebellion: stories taking place between 0 BBY to 5 ABY.
- New Republic: stories taking place between 5 ABY to 25 ABY.
- New Jedi Order: stories taking place between 25 ABY to 37 ABY.
- Legacy: stories taking place after 37 ABY.

=== Adult and young reader books ===
Timeline	Series	Title	Author	Release date	Maturity	Audiobook	Note
25,793 BBY	Dawn of the Jedi	Into the Void	Tim Lebbon	2013-05-07	AA	Yes	(Note: All versions of Dawn of the Jedi: Into the Void also contain the short story "Eruption")
5,000 BBY	Lost Tribe of the Sith	Precipice	John Jackson Miller	2009-05-28	EB	No	(Note: Collected in Lost Tribe of the Sith: The Collected Stories)
5,000 BBY	Lost Tribe of the Sith	Skyborn	John Jackson Miller	2009-07-21	EB	No	(Note: Collected in Lost Tribe of the Sith: The Collected Stories)
4,985 BBY	Lost Tribe of the Sith	Paragon	John Jackson Miller	2010-02-10	EB	No	(Note: Collected in Lost Tribe of the Sith: The Collected Stories)
4,975 BBY	Lost Tribe of the Sith	Savior	John Jackson Miller	2010-04-27	EB	No	(Note: Collected in Lost Tribe of the Sith: The Collected Stories)
3,960 BBY	Lost Tribe of the Sith	Purgatory	John Jackson Miller	2010-10-25	EB	No	(Note: Collected in Lost Tribe of the Sith: The Collected Stories)
3,960 BBY	Lost Tribe of the Sith	Sentinel	John Jackson Miller	2011-02-21	EB	No	(Note: Collected in Lost Tribe of the Sith: The Collected Stories)
3,956 BBY	Knights of the Old Republic		Drew Karpyshyn	2003-07-16	Game	N/A	
3,954–3,950 BBY (Note: Epilogue set in 3,900 BBY)	The Old Republic	Revan	Drew Karpyshyn	2011-11-15	AA	Yes	
3,951 BBY	Knights of the Old Republic II		Chris Avellone	2004-12-06	Game	N/A	
3,653 BBY	The Old Republic	Deceived	Paul S. Kemp	2011-03-22	AA	Yes	
3,645 BBY	Red Harvest		Joe Schreiber	2010-12-28	AA	Yes	
3,643 BBY	The Old Republic	Fatal Alliance	Sean Williams	2010-07-20	AA	Yes	
3,643–3,639 BBY	The Old Republic			2011-12-13	Game	N/A	
3,640 BBY	The Old Republic	Annihilation	Drew Karpyshyn	2012-11-13	AA	Yes	
3,000 BBY	Lost Tribe of the Sith	Pantheon	John Jackson Miller	2011-07-18	EB	No	
3,000 BBY	Lost Tribe of the Sith	Secrets	John Jackson Miller	2012-03-05	EB	No	
2,975 BBY	Lost Tribe of the Sith	Pandemonium	John Jackson Miller	2012-07-24	EB	No	
1,032 BBY	Knight Errant		John Jackson Miller	2011-01-25	AA	No	(Note: Builds on the Star Wars: Knight Errant comic series)
1,003–1,000 BBY	Darth Bane	Path of Destruction	Drew Karpyshyn	2006-09-26	AA	Yes	
1,000–990 BBY	Darth Bane	Rule of Two	Drew Karpyshyn	2007-12-26	AA	Yes	
980 BBY	Darth Bane	Dynasty of Evil	Drew Karpyshyn	2009-12-08	AA	Yes	
89–22 BBY	Legacy of the Jedi		Jude Watson	2003-08-01	YA	No	(Note: Collected in Legacy of the Jedi/Secrets of the Jedi omnibus)
67–32 BBY	Darth Plagueis		James Luceno	2012-01-10	AA	Yes	
51–21 BBY	The Wrath of Darth Maul		Ryder Windham	2012-01-01	YA	No	
44 BBY	Jedi Apprentice	The Rising Force	Dave Wolverton	1999-05-03	YA	No	
44 BBY	Jedi Apprentice	The Dark Rival	Jude Watson	1999-05-03	YA	No	
44 BBY	Jedi Apprentice	The Hidden Past	Jude Watson	1999-08-01	YA	No	
44 BBY	Jedi Apprentice	The Mark of the Crown	Jude Watson	1999-10-01	YA	No	
44 BBY	Jedi Apprentice	The Defenders of the Dead	Jude Watson	1999-12-01	YA	No	
44 BBY	Jedi Apprentice	The Uncertain Path	Jude Watson	2000-02-01	YA	No	
44 BBY	Jedi Apprentice	The Captive Temple	Jude Watson	2000-04-01	YA	No	
44 BBY	Jedi Apprentice	The Day of Reckoning	Jude Watson	2000-06-01	YA	No	
44 BBY	Jedi Apprentice	The Fight for Truth	Jude Watson	2000-08-01	YA	No	
44 BBY	Jedi Apprentice	The Shattered Peace	Jude Watson	2000-10-01	YA	No	
44–29 BBY	Jedi Apprentice	Special Edition: Deceptions	Jude Watson	2001-07-01	YA	No	
44–9 BBY	The Life and Legend of Obi-Wan Kenobi		Ryder Windham	2008-08-27	YA	No	
43 BBY	Jedi Apprentice	The Deadly Hunter	Jude Watson	2000-12-01	YA	No	
43 BBY	Jedi Apprentice	The Evil Experiment	Jude Watson	2001-02-01	YA	No	
43 BBY	Jedi Apprentice	The Dangerous Rescue	Jude Watson	2001-04-01	YA	No	
41 BBY	Jedi Apprentice	The Ties That Bind	Jude Watson	2001-08-01	YA	No	
41 BBY	Jedi Apprentice	The Death of Hope	Jude Watson	2001-10-01	YA	No	
41 BBY	Jedi Apprentice	The Call to Vengeance	Jude Watson	2001-12-01	YA	No	
40 BBY	Jedi Apprentice	The Only Witness	Jude Watson	2002-02-01	YA	No	
40 BBY	Jedi Apprentice	The Threat Within	Jude Watson	2002-03-01	YA	No	
39–28 BBY	Jedi Apprentice	Special Edition: The Followers	Jude Watson	2002-04-01	YA	No	
39–22 BBY	Secrets of the Jedi		Jude Watson	2005-03-01	YA	No	
39 BBY–4 ABY	The Rise and Fall of Darth Vader		Ryder Windham	2007-10-01	YA	No	
33 BBY	Darth Maul: Saboteur		James Luceno	2001-02-15	EB	No	(Note: Later reprinted in the paperback version of Darth Maul: Shadow Hunter)
33 BBY	Maul: Lockdown		Joe Schreiber	2014-01-28	AA	Yes	
32 BBY	Cloak of Deception		James Luceno	2001-05-29	AA	Yes	
32 BBY	Darth Maul: Shadow Hunter		Michael Reaves	2001-01-30	AA	Yes	(Note: The second paperback version of Darth Maul: Shadow Hunter also contains the short story "Restraint")
32 BBY	Episode I – The Phantom Menace		George Lucas	1999-05-19	Movie	N/A	
29 BBY	Rogue Planet		Greg Bear	2000-05-02	AA	Yes	
28 BBY	Jedi Quest	Path to Truth	Jude Watson	2001–09	YA	No	
27 BBY	Jedi Quest	The Way of the Apprentice	Jude Watson	2002-04-23	YA	Yes	
27 BBY	Outbound Flight		Timothy Zahn	2006-01-31	AA	Yes	
27 BBY	Jedi Quest	The Trail of the Jedi	Jude Watson	2002-04-23	YA	Yes	
27 BBY	Jedi Quest	The Dangerous Games	Jude Watson	2002-08-01	YA	Yes	
25 BBY	Jedi Quest	The Master of Disguise	Jude Watson	2002-11-01	YA	Yes	
25 BBY	Jedi Quest	The School of Fear	Jude Watson	2003-02-01	YA	No	
25 BBY	Jedi Quest	The Shadow Trap	Jude Watson	2003-05-01	YA	No	
25 BBY	Jedi Quest	The Moment of Truth	Jude Watson	2003-11-01	YA	No	
24 BBY	Jedi Quest	The Changing of the Guard	Jude Watson	2004-03-01	YA	No	
24 BBY	Jedi Quest	The False Peace	Jude Watson	2004-07-01	YA	No	
23 BBY	Jedi Quest	The Final Showdown	Jude Watson	2004-11-01	YA	No	
22 BBY	The Approaching Storm		Alan Dean Foster	2002-01-29	AA	Maybe	
22 BBY	Episode II – Attack of the Clones		George Lucas	2002-05-16	Movie	N/A	
22 BBY	Boba Fett	The Fight to Survive	Terry Bisson	2003-04-23	YA	No	
22 BBY	Boba Fett	Crossfire	Terry Bisson	2003-11-01	YA	No	
22 BBY	Boba Fett	Maze of Deception	Elizabeth Hand	2003–04	YA	No	
22 BBY	Clone Wars	The Cestus Deception	Steven Barnes	2004-06-01	AA	Maybe	
22 BBY	Clone Wars	The Hive	Steven Barnes	2004-05-27	EB	No	(Note: Later reprinted in The Cestus Deception)
22 BBY	Clone Wars	Jedi Trial	David Sherman & Dan Cragg	2004-10-26	AA	Maybe	
22 BBY	The Clone Wars		Henry Gilroy & Steven Melching & Scott Murphy	2008-08-14	Movie	N/A	
22 BBY	The Clone Wars: Secret Missions	Breakout Squad	Ryder Windham	2009-09-03	YA	No	
22 BBY	The Clone Wars: Secret Missions	Curse of the Black Hole Pirates	Ryder Windham	2010-07-22	YA	No	
22 BBY	The Clone Wars: Secret Missions	Duel at Shattered Rock	Ryder Windham	2011-03-03	YA	No	
22 BBY	The Clone Wars: Secret Missions	Guardians of the Chiss Key	Ryder Windham	2012-03-15	YA	No	
22 BBY	The Clone Wars	Wild Space	Karen Miller	2008-12-09	AA	Yes	
22 BBY	Boba Fett	Hunted	Elizabeth Hand	2003-10-01	YA	No	
22 BBY	Republic Commando	Hard Contact	Karen Traviss	2004-10-26	AA	Yes	
22 BBY	Clone Wars	Shatterpoint	Matthew Stover	2003-06-03	AA	Yes	
22 BBY	The Clone Wars	No Prisoners	Karen Traviss	2009-05-19	AA	Yes	
22 BBY	Republic Commando	Triple Zero	Karen Traviss	2006-02-28	AA	No	(Note: The versions of Republic Commando: Triple Zero published by Del Rey also contain the short story "Omega Squad: Targets")
21 BBY	Clone Wars Gambit	Stealth	Karen Miller	2010-02-23	AA	Yes	
21 BBY	Clone Wars Gambit	Siege	Karen Miller	2010-07-06	AA	Yes	
21 BBY	Republic Commando	True Colors	Karen Traviss	2007-10-30	AA	No	(Note: All versions of Republic Commando: True Colors also contain the short story "Republic Commando: Odds")
20 BBY	Clone Wars	MedStar I: Battle Surgeons	Michael Reaves & Steve Perry	2004-06-29	AA	Maybe	
20 BBY	Clone Wars	MedStar II: Jedi Healer	Michael Reaves & Steve Perry	2004-09-28	AA	Maybe	
19 BBY	Clone Wars	Yoda: Dark Rendezvous	Sean Stewart	2004-11-23	AA	Yes	
19 BBY	Boba Fett	A New Threat	Elizabeth Hand	2004-04-01	YA	No	
19 BBY	Boba Fett	Pursuit	Elizabeth Hand	2004-10-28	YA	No	
19 BBY	Labyrinth of Evil		James Luceno	2005-01-25	AA	Yes	
19 BBY (Note: Takes place partially concurrently with Episode III – Revenge of the Sith)	Republic Commando	Order 66	Karen Traviss	2008-09-16	AA	No	
19 BBY	Episode III – Revenge of the Sith		George Lucas	2005-05-19	Movie	N/A	
19 BBY	Kenobi		John Jackson Miller	2013-08-27	AA	Yes	(Note: The paperback version of Kenobi also contains the short story "Incognito")
19 BBY	Imperial Commando: 501st		Karen Traviss	2009-10-27	AA	No	(Note: Standalone continuation to the Republic Commando series)
19 BBY	Dark Lord: The Rise of Darth Vader		James Luceno	2005-11-22	AA	Yes	
19 BBY	Coruscant Nights	Jedi Twilight	Michael Reaves	2008-06-24	AA	No	
18 BBY	The Last of the Jedi	The Desperate Mission	Jude Watson	2005-04-02	YA	No	
18 BBY	The Last of the Jedi	Dark Warning	Jude Watson	2005-09-01	YA	No	
18 BBY	The Last of the Jedi	Underworld	Jude Watson	2005-12-01	YA	No	
18 BBY	The Last of the Jedi	Death on Naboo	Jude Watson	2006-04-01	YA	No	
18 BBY	Coruscant Nights	Street of Shadows	Michael Reaves	2008-08-26	AA	No	
18 BBY	The Last of the Jedi	A Tangled Web	Jude Watson	2006	YA	No	
18 BBY	The Last of the Jedi	Return of the Dark Side	Jude Watson	2006	YA	No	
18 BBY	The Last of the Jedi	Secret Weapon	Jude Watson	2007	YA	No	
18 BBY	The Last of the Jedi	Against The Empire	Jude Watson	2007	YA	No	
18 BBY	The Last of the Jedi	Master of Deception	Jude Watson	2008	YA	No	
18 BBY	The Last of the Jedi	Reckoning	Jude Watson	2008	YA	No	
18 BBY	Coruscant Nights	Patterns of Force	Michael Reaves	2009	AA	No	
18 BBY	The Last Jedi		Michael Reaves & Maya Kaathryn Bohnhoff	2013	AA	No	(Note: Standalone continuation to the Coruscant Nights trilogy)
15 BBY–4 ABY	A New Hope: The Life of Luke Skywalker		Ryder Windham	2009	YA	No	
10 BBY	Han Solo	The Paradise Snare	A.C. Crispin	1997	AA	Maybe	
5–4 BBY	Han Solo	The Hutt Gambit	A.C. Crispin	1997	AA	Maybe	
3–2 BBY	The Force Unleashed		Haden Blackman	2008	Game	N/A	
3–2 BBY	Adventures of Lando Calrissian	The Mindharp of Sharu	L. Neil Smith	1983	AA	No	
3–2 BBY	Adventures of Lando Calrissian	The Flamewind of Oseon	L. Neil Smith	1983	AA	No	
3–2 BBY	Adventures of Lando Calrissian	The Starcave of ThonBoka	L. Neil Smith	1983	AA	No	
3–0 BBY	Death Star		Michael Reaves & Steve Perry	2009	AA	No	
2–0 BBY	Han Solo	Rebel Dawn	A.C. Crispin	1998	AA	Maybe	
2–1 BBY (Note: Takes place concurrently with Rebel Dawn)	Han Solo Adventures	Han Solo at Stars' End	Brian Daley	1979	AA	No	
2–1 BBY	Han Solo Adventures	Han Solo's Revenge	Brian Daley	1979	AA	No	
2–1 BBY	Han Solo Adventures	Han Solo and the Lost Legacy	Brian Daley	1980	AA	No	
1 BBY	The Force Unleashed II		Haden Blackman	2010	Game	N/A	
1 BBY–2 ABY	Dark Forces		Justin Chin	1995-02-28	Game	N/A	
1 BBY	Death Troopers		Joe Schreiber	2009-10-13	AA	Yes	
0 BBY	Shadow Games		Michael Reaves & Maya Kaathryn Bohnhoff	2011	AA	No	
0 BBY–0 ABY	Episode IV – A New Hope		George Lucas	1977	Movie	N/A	
0 ABY	Winner Lose All		Timothy Zahn	2012-12-10	EB	No	(Note: Later reprinted in the paperback version of Scoundrels)
0 ABY	Scoundrels		Timothy Zahn	2013-01-01	AA	Yes	
0 ABY	Rebel Force	Target	Alex Wheeler	2008	YA	No	
0 ABY	Rebel Force	Hostage	Alex Wheeler	2008	YA	No	
0 ABY	Rebel Force	Renegade	Alex Wheeler	2009	YA	No	
0 ABY	Rebel Force	Firefight	Alex Wheeler	2009	YA	No	
0 ABY	Rebel Force	Trapped	Alex Wheeler	2010	YA	No	
0 ABY	Allegiance		Timothy Zahn	2007	AA	Yes	
0 ABY	Rebel Force	Uprising	Alex Wheeler	2010	YA	No	
0 ABY	Galaxy of Fear	Eaten Alive	John Whitman	1997	YA	No	
0 ABY	Galaxy of Fear	City of the Dead	John Whitman	1997	YA	No	
0 ABY	Galaxy of Fear	Planet Plague	John Whitman	1997	YA	No	
0 ABY	Galaxy of Fear	The Nightmare Machine	John Whitman	1997	YA	No	
0 ABY	Galaxy of Fear	Ghost of the Jedi	John Whitman	1997	YA	No	
0 ABY	Galaxy of Fear	Army of Terror	John Whitman	1997	YA	No	
0 ABY	Galaxy of Fear	The Brain Spiders	John Whitman	1997	YA	No	
0 ABY	Galaxy of Fear	The Swarm	John Whitman	1998	YA	No	
0 ABY	Choices of One		Timothy Zahn	2011	AA	No	
0 ABY	Galaxy of Fear	Spore	John Whitman	1998	YA	No	
0 ABY	Galaxy of Fear	The Doomsday Ship	John Whitman	1998	YA	No	
0 ABY	Galaxy of Fear	Clones	John Whitman	1998	YA	No	
1 ABY	Galaxy of Fear	The Hunger	John Whitman	1998	YA	No	
1 ABY	Galaxies: The Ruins of Dantooine		Voronica Whitney-Robinson & Haden Blackman	2003	AA	No	(Note: Builds on the video game Star Wars Galaxies (2003))
2 ABY	Splinter of the Mind's Eye		Alan Dean Foster	1978-03	AA	(Note: Audiobook for the disabled only)	
2 ABY	Empire and Rebellion	Razor's Edge	Martha Wells	2013	AA	Yes	
2–3 ABY	Empire and Rebellion	Honor Among Thieves	James S. A. Corey	2014	AA	Yes	(Note: All versions of Honor Among Thieves also contain the short story "Silver and Scarlet")
3 ABY	Episode V – The Empire Strikes Back		George Lucas	1980	Movie	N/A	
3–4 ABY	Shadows of the Empire		Steve Perry	1996	AA	Yes	
3–4 ABY	Shadows of the Empire		Christopher Golden	1996	YA		
4 ABY	Episode VI – Return of the Jedi		George Lucas	1983	Movie	N/A	
4 ABY (Note: Takes place concurrently with Episode VI – Return of the Jedi)	Bounty Hunter Wars	The Mandalorian Armor	Kevin Wayne Jeter	1998	AA	Maybe	
4 ABY	Bounty Hunter Wars	Slave Ship	Kevin Wayne Jeter	1998	AA	Maybe	
4 ABY	Bounty Hunter Wars	Hard Merchandise	Kevin Wayne Jeter	1999	AA	Maybe	
4 ABY	The Truce at Bakura		Kathy Tyers	1993	AA	Maybe	
5 ABY	Luke Skywalker and the Shadows of Mindor		Matthew Stover	2008-12-30	AA	No	
5 ABY	Jedi Prince	The Glove of Darth Vader	Paul Davids & Hollace Davids	1992-07-01	YA	No	(Note: Collected in Star Wars: Book One)
5 ABY	Jedi Prince	The Lost City of the Jedi	Paul Davids & Hollace Davids	1992-07-01	YA	No	(Note: Collected in Star Wars: Book One)
5 ABY	Jedi Prince	Zorba the Hutt's Revenge	Paul Davids & Hollace Davids	1992-08-01	YA	No	(Note: Collected in Star Wars: Book One)
5 ABY	Jedi Prince	Mission from Mount Yoda	Paul Davids & Hollace Davids	1993-02-01	YA	No	(Note: Collected in Star Wars: Book Two)
5 ABY	Jedi Prince	Queen of the Empire	Paul Davids & Hollace Davids	1993-03-01	YA	No	(Note: Collected in Star Wars: Book Two)
5 ABY	Jedi Prince	Prophets of the Dark Side	Paul Davids & Hollace Davids	1993-05-01	YA	No	(Note: Collected in Star Wars: Book Two)
5 ABY	Jedi Knight: Dark Forces II		Peter Chan	1997-10-09	Game	N/A	
6 ABY	X-wing	Rogue Squadron	Michael A. Stackpole	1996	AA	Yes	
7 ABY	X-wing	Wedge's Gamble	Michael A. Stackpole	1996	AA	Yes	
7 ABY	X-wing	The Krytos Trap	Michael A. Stackpole	1996	AA	Yes	
7 ABY	X-wing	The Bacta War	Michael A. Stackpole	1997	AA	Yes	
7 ABY	X-wing	Wraith Squadron	Aaron Allston	1998	AA	Yes	
7 ABY	X-wing	Iron Fist	Aaron Allston	1998	AA	Yes	
7 ABY	X-wing	Solo Command	Aaron Allston	1999	AA	Yes	
8 ABY	The Courtship of Princess Leia		Dave Wolverton	1994	AA	Yes	
8 ABY	A Forest Apart		Troy Denning	2003	EB	No	(Note: Later reprinted in Tatooine Ghost)
8 ABY	Tatooine Ghost		Troy Denning	2003	AA	Maybe	
9 ABY	Thrawn	Heir to the Empire	Timothy Zahn	1991	AA	Yes	
9 ABY	Thrawn	Dark Force Rising	Timothy Zahn	1992	AA	Yes	
9 ABY	Thrawn	The Last Command	Timothy Zahn	1993	AA	Yes	
9 ABY	X-wing	Isard's Revenge	Michael A. Stackpole	1999	AA	Maybe	
11 ABY	Jedi Academy	Jedi Search	Kevin J. Anderson	1994	AA	Maybe	
11 ABY	Jedi Academy	Dark Apprentice	Kevin J. Anderson	1994	AA	Maybe	
11 ABY	Jedi Academy	Champions of the Force	Kevin J. Anderson	1994	AA	Maybe	
11 ABY	I, Jedi		Michael A. Stackpole	1998	AA	Yes	(Note: Standalone continuation to the Jedi Academy trilogy)
12 ABY	Callista	Children of the Jedi	Barbara Hambly	1995	AA	Maybe	
12 ABY	Jedi Knight II: Jedi Outcast		Michael Stemmle	2002-03-28	Game	N/A	
12 ABY	Callista	Darksaber	Kevin J. Anderson	1995	AA	Maybe	
13 ABY	X-wing	Starfighters of Adumar	Aaron Allston	1999	AA	Maybe	
13 ABY	Callista	Planet of Twilight	Barbara Hambly	1997	AA	Maybe	
14 ABY	The Crystal Star		Vonda McIntyre	1994	AA	Maybe	
14 ABY	Jedi Knight: Jedi Academy			2003-09-16	Game	N/A	
16–17 ABY	Black Fleet Crisis	Before the Storm	Michael P. Kube-McDowell	1996	AA	Maybe	
16–17 ABY	Black Fleet Crisis	Shield of Lies	Michael P. Kube-McDowell	1996	AA	Maybe	
16–17 ABY	Black Fleet Crisis	Tyrant's Test	Michael P. Kube-McDowell	1996	AA	Maybe	
17 ABY	The New Rebellion		Kristine Kathryn Rusch	1996	AA	Maybe	
18 ABY	Corellia	Ambush at Corellia	Roger MacBride Allen	1995	AA	Maybe	
18 ABY	Corellia	Assault at Selonia	Roger MacBride Allen	1995	AA	Maybe	
18 ABY	Corellia	Showdown at Centerpoint	Roger MacBride Allen	1995	AA	Maybe	
19 ABY	Hand of Thrawn	Specter of the Past	Timothy Zahn	1997-11-03	AA	Yes	
19 ABY	Hand of Thrawn	Vision of the Future	Timothy Zahn	1998-09-01	AA	Yes	
19 ABY	Scourge		Jeff Grubb	2012-04-24	AA	No	(Note: Adaptation of an adventure for the Star Wars Roleplaying Game (2000))
22 ABY	Junior Jedi Knights	The Golden Globe	Nancy Richardson	1995-10-08	YA	No	
22 ABY	Junior Jedi Knights	Lyric's World	Nancy Richardson	1996-01-01	YA	No	
22 ABY	Junior Jedi Knights	Promises	Nancy Richardson	1996-04-01	YA	No	
22 ABY	Junior Jedi Knights	Anakin's Quest	Rebecca Moesta	1997-05-01	YA	No	
22 ABY	Junior Jedi Knights	Vader's Fortress	Rebecca Moesta	1997-07-01	YA	No	
22 ABY	Junior Jedi Knights	Kenobi's Blade	Rebecca Moesta	1997-09-01	YA	No	
22 ABY	Fool's Bargain		Timothy Zahn	2004-02-03	EB	No	(Note: Later reprinted in Survivor's Quest)
22 ABY	Survivor's Quest		Timothy Zahn	2004-02-03	AA	Yes	
23 ABY	Young Jedi Knights	Heirs of the Force	Kevin J. Anderson & Rebecca Moesta	1995-06-01	YA	No	(Note: Collected in Young Jedi Knights: The Rise of the Shadow Academy) (Note: Collected in Young Jedi Knights: Jedi Shadow)
23 ABY	Young Jedi Knights	Shadow Academy	Kevin J. Anderson & Rebecca Moesta	1995-09-01	YA	No	(Note: Collected in Young Jedi Knights: The Rise of the Shadow Academy) (Note: Collected in Young Jedi Knights: Jedi Shadow)
23 ABY	Young Jedi Knights	The Lost Ones	Kevin J. Anderson & Rebecca Moesta	1995-12-01	YA	No	(Note: Collected in Young Jedi Knights: The Rise of the Shadow Academy) (Note: Collected in Young Jedi Knights: Jedi Shadow)
23 ABY	Young Jedi Knights	Lightsabers	Kevin J. Anderson & Rebecca Moesta	1996-03-01	YA	No	(Note: Collected in Young Jedi Knights: Jedi Sunrise)
23 ABY	Young Jedi Knights	Darkest Knight	Kevin J. Anderson & Rebecca Moesta	1996-06-01	YA	No	(Note: Collected in Young Jedi Knights: Jedi Sunrise)
23 ABY	Young Jedi Knights	Jedi Under Siege	Kevin J. Anderson & Rebecca Moesta	1996-09-01	YA	No	(Note: Collected in Young Jedi Knights: Jedi Sunrise)
23–24 ABY	Young Jedi Knights	Shards of Alderaan	Kevin J. Anderson & Rebecca Moesta	1997-01-01	YA	No	(Note: Collected in Young Jedi Knights: The Fall of the Diversity Alliance)
24 ABY	Young Jedi Knights	Diversity Alliance	Kevin J. Anderson & Rebecca Moesta	1997-04-01	YA	No	(Note: Collected in Young Jedi Knights: The Fall of the Diversity Alliance)
24 ABY	Young Jedi Knights	Delusions of Grandeur	Kevin J. Anderson & Rebecca Moesta	1997-07-01	YA	No	(Note: Collected in Young Jedi Knights: The Fall of the Diversity Alliance)
24 ABY	Young Jedi Knights	Jedi Bounty	Kevin J. Anderson & Rebecca Moesta	1997-10-01	YA	No	(Note: Collected in Young Jedi Knights: The Fall of the Diversity Alliance)
24 ABY	Young Jedi Knights	The Emperor's Plague	Kevin J. Anderson & Rebecca Moesta	1998-01-01	YA	No	(Note: Collected in Young Jedi Knights: The Fall of the Diversity Alliance)
24 ABY	Young Jedi Knights	Return to Ord Mantell	Kevin J. Anderson & Rebecca Moesta	1998-05-01	YA	No	(Note: Collected in Young Jedi Knights: Under Black Sun)
24 ABY	Young Jedi Knights	Trouble on Cloud City	Kevin J. Anderson & Rebecca Moesta	1998-08-01	YA	No	(Note: Collected in Young Jedi Knights: Under Black Sun)
24 ABY	Young Jedi Knights	Crisis at Crystal Reef	Kevin J. Anderson & Rebecca Moesta	1998-12-01	YA	No	(Note: Collected in Young Jedi Knights: Under Black Sun)
24–25 ABY	Boba Fett: A Practical Man		Karen Traviss	2006-08-15	EB	No	(Note: Later reprinted in Legacy of the Force: Sacrifice)
25 ABY	The New Jedi Order	Vector Prime	R.A. Salvatore	1999-10-05	AA	Maybe	
25 ABY	The New Jedi Order	Dark Tide I: Onslaught	Michael Stackpole	2000-02-01	AA	Maybe	
25 ABY	The New Jedi Order	Dark Tide II: Ruin	Michael Stackpole	2000-06-06	AA	Maybe	
25 ABY	The New Jedi Order	Agents of Chaos I: Hero's Trial	James Luceno	2000-08-01	AA	Maybe	
25 ABY	The New Jedi Order	Agents of Chaos II: Jedi Eclipse	James Luceno	2000-10-03	AA	Maybe	
26 ABY	The New Jedi Order	Balance Point	Kathy Tyers	2000-10-31	AA	Maybe	
26 ABY	The New Jedi Order	Recovery	Troy Denning	2001-12-03	EB	No	(Note: Later reprinted in The New Jedi Order: Star by Star)
26 ABY	The New Jedi Order	Edge of Victory I: Conquest	Greg Keyes	2001-04-03	AA	Maybe	
26 ABY	The New Jedi Order	Edge of Victory II: Rebirth	Greg Keyes	2001-07-31	AA	Maybe	
27 ABY	The New Jedi Order	Star by Star	Troy Denning	2001-10-30	AA	Maybe	
27 ABY	The New Jedi Order	Dark Journey	Elaine Cunningham	2002-01-29	AA	Maybe	
27 ABY	The New Jedi Order	Enemy Lines I: Rebel Dream	Aaron Allston	2002-03-26	AA	Maybe	
27 ABY	The New Jedi Order	Enemy Lines II: Rebel Stand	Aaron Allston	2002-05-28	AA	Maybe	
27 ABY	The New Jedi Order	Traitor	Matthew Stover	2002-07-30	AA	Maybe	
28 ABY	The New Jedi Order	Destiny's Way	Walter Jon Williams	2002-10-01	AA	Maybe	
28 ABY	The New Jedi Order	Ylesia	Walter Jon Williams	2002-09-03	EB	No	(Note: Later reprinted in Dark Nest I: The Joiner King)
28 ABY	The New Jedi Order	Force Heretic I: Remnant	Sean Williams & Shane Dix	2003-02-04	AA	Maybe	
28 ABY	The New Jedi Order	Force Heretic II: Refugee	Sean Williams & Shane Dix	2003-04-29	AA	Maybe	
28 ABY	The New Jedi Order	Force Heretic III: Reunion	Sean Williams & Shane Dix	2003-07-01	AA	Maybe	
28 ABY	The New Jedi Order	The Final Prophecy	Greg Keyes	2003-09-30	AA	Maybe	
29 ABY	The New Jedi Order	The Unifying Force	James Luceno	2003-11-04	AA	Maybe	
35 ABY	Dark Nest	The Joiner King	Troy Denning	2005-07-26	AA	Maybe	
36 ABY	Dark Nest	The Unseen Queen	Troy Denning	2005-09-27	AA	Maybe	
36 ABY	Dark Nest	The Swarm War	Troy Denning	2005-12-27	AA	Maybe	
40 ABY	Legacy of the Force	Betrayal	Aaron Allston	2006-05-30	AA	Maybe	
40 ABY	Legacy of the Force	Bloodlines	Karen Traviss	2006-08-29	AA	Maybe	
40 ABY	Legacy of the Force	Tempest	Troy Denning	2006-11-28	AA	Maybe	
40 ABY	Legacy of the Force	Exile	Aaron Allston	2007-02-27	AA	Maybe	
40 ABY	Legacy of the Force	Sacrifice	Karen Traviss	2007-05-29	AA	Maybe	
40 ABY	Legacy of the Force	Inferno	Troy Denning	2007-08-28	AA	Maybe	
40 ABY	Legacy of the Force	Fury	Aaron Allston	2007-11-27	AA	Maybe	
41 ABY	Legacy of the Force	Revelation	Karen Traviss	2008-02-26	AA	Maybe	
41 ABY	Legacy of the Force	Invincible	Troy Denning	2008-05-13	AA	Maybe	
41 ABY (Note: Flashbacks set in 5000 BBY)	Crosscurrent		Paul S. Kemp	2010-01-26	AA	No	
41 ABY	Riptide		Paul S. Kemp	2011-10-25	AA	No	
43 ABY (Note: Flashbacks set in 60 BBY, 19 BBY, 10 BBY and 5 BBY)	Millennium Falcon		James Luceno	2008-10-21	AA	Yes	
43 ABY	Fate of the Jedi	Outcast	Aaron Allston	2009-03-24	AA	Yes	
43 ABY	Fate of the Jedi	Omen	Christie Golden	2009-06-23	AA	Yes	
43 ABY	Fate of the Jedi	Abyss	Troy Denning	2009-08-18	AA	Yes	
43 ABY	Fate of the Jedi	Backlash	Aaron Allston	2010-03-09	AA	Yes	
44 ABY	Fate of the Jedi	Allies	Christie Golden	2010-05-25	AA	Yes	
44 ABY	Fate of the Jedi	Vortex	Troy Denning	2010-11-30	AA	Yes	
44 ABY	Fate of the Jedi	Conviction	Aaron Allston	2011-05-24	AA	Yes	
44 ABY	Fate of the Jedi	Ascension	Christie Golden	2011-08-09	AA	Yes	
44 ABY	Fate of the Jedi	Apocalypse	Troy Denning	2012-03-13	AA	Yes	
44 ABY	X-wing	Mercy Kill	Aaron Allston	2012-08-07	AA	Yes	
45 ABY (Note: Flashbacks set in 13 ABY, 19 ABY and 29 ABY)	Crucible		Troy Denning	2013-07-09	AA	Yes	

=== Short stories ===
==== Star Wars Adventure Journal (1994–1997) ====
Several short stories have been published in the Star Wars Adventure Journal Magazine published by West End Games.

Timeline	Title	Author	Release date	Issue#	Note
6 ABY	A Glimmer of Hope	Charlene Newcomb	February 1994	#1	
0 BBY	Breaking Free: The Adventures of Dannen Lifehold	Dave Marron	February 1994	#1	
7 ABY	Chessa's Doom	Peter Schweighofer	February 1994	#1	
4 ABY	Escape from Balis-Baurgh	Paul Balsamo	February 1994	#1	
7 ABY	Big Quince	Peter Schweighofer	May 1994	#2	
3 BBY	Out of the Cradle	Patricia A. Jackson	May 1994	#2	
6 ABY	Whispers in the Dark	Charlene Newcomb	May 1994	#2	
0 BBY	Changing the Odds: The Adventures of Dannen Lifehold	Dave Marron	August 1994	#3	
0 ABY	Droid Trouble	Chuck Sperati	August 1994	#3	
7 ABY	Explosive Developments	Peter Schweighofer	August 1994	#3	
8 ABY	Mission to Zila	Charlene Newcomb	August 1994	#3	
2 BBY	When the Domino Falls	Patricia A. Jackson	August 1994	#3	
8 ABY	Shadows of Darkness	Charlene Newcomb	November 1994	#4	
7 ABY	Starter's Tale	Peter Schweighofer	November 1994	#4	
0 ABY	A Bitter Winter	Patricia A. Jackson	February 1995	#5	
	One of a Kind	Paul Danner	February 1995	#5	
6 BBY	Turning Point	Charlene Newcomb	February 1995	#5	
7 ABY	Vengeance Strike	Peter Schweighofer	February 1995	#5	
1 ABY	Finder's Fee	Peter Schweighofer	May 1995	#6	
9 ABY	Rendezvous with Destiny	Charlene Newcomb	May 1995	#6	
0 BBY	Ringers	Laurie Burns	May 1995	#6	
0 ABY	To Fight Another Day	Kathy Tyers	May 1995	#6	
7 ABY	Kella Rand, Reporting...	Laurie Burns	May 1995	#6	
19 BBY	Mist Encounter	Timothy Zahn	August 1995	#7	
3 BBY	Passages	Charlene Newcomb	August 1995	#7	
3 ABY	Firepower	Carolyn Golledge	November 1995	#8	
2 ABY	Combat Moon	John Whitman	February 1996	#9	
4 ABY	Easy Credits	Paul Danner	February 1996	#9	
3 ABY	Desperate Measures	Carolyn Golledge	May 1996	#10	
0 ABY	Only Droids Serve the Make	Kathy Tyers	May 1996	#10	
2 ABY	The Capture of 'Imperial Hazard	Nora Mayers	May 1996	#10	
2 ABY	Command Decision	Timothy Zahn	November 1996	#11	
0 BBY	Spare Parts	Pablo Hidalgo	November 1996	#11	
0 ABY	The Most Dangerous Foe	Angela Philips	November 1996	#11	
9 ABY	Betrayal by Knight	Charlene Newcomb/Patricia A. Jackson	February 1997	#12	
2 ABY	Idol Intentions	Patricia A. Jackson	February 1997	#12	
0 ABY	Small Favors	Paul Danner	February 1997	#12	
0 ABY	The Occupation of Rhamalai	M. H. Watkins	May 1997	#13	
2 ABY	Crimson Bounty	Charlene Newcomb	August 1997	#14	
13 ABY	Murder in Slushtime	Barbara Hambly	August 1997	#14	
1 ABY	The Breath of Gelgelar	Jean Rabe	August 1997	#14	
11 ABY	Firestorm	Duane Maxwell	November 1997	#15	
2 ABY	Laughter after Dark	Patricia A. Jackson	November 1997	#15	
2 ABY	The Draw	Angela Philips	November 1997	#15	
0 ABY	The Great Herdship Heist	Daniel Wallace	November 1997	#15	
17 ABY	Two for One	Paul Danner	November 1997	#15	

==== Star Wars Gamer (2000–2002) ====
A few short stories have been published in the short lived Star Wars Gamer Magazine, published bi-monthly by Wizards of the Coast.

Timeline	Title	Author	Release date	Issue#	Note
33 BBY	The Starfighter Trap	Steve Miller	November 2000	#1	
0 ABY	Fair Prey	Daniel Wallace	November 2000	#1	
4 ABY	A Credit for Your Thoughts	Tish Eggleston Pahl/Chris Cassidy	February 2001	#2	
36 BBY	The Monster	Daniel Wallace	February 2001	#2	
1000 BBY	Bane of the Sith	Kevin J. Anderson	April 2001	#3	
32 BBY	Deep Spoilers	Ryder Windham	June 2001	#4	
24 ABY	The Crystal	Elaine Cunningham	July 2001	#5	
1000 BBY	Darkness Shared	Bill Slavicsek	July 2001	#5	
2 BBY	Rebel Bass	Kathy Tyers	August 2001	#6	
19 ABY	Red Sky, Blue Flame	Elaine Cunningham	October 2001	#7	
26 ABY	Battle on Bonadan	Greg Keyes	January 2002	#8	
27 ABY	The Apprentice	Elaine Cunningham	January 2002	#8	
26 ABY	Dark Tidings	Greg Keyes	March 2002	#9	
26 ABY	The War on Wayland	Greg Keyes	May 2002	#10	
4 ABY	Handoff	Timothy Zahn	May 2002	#10	

==== Star Wars Insider (2002–2014) ====
Various short stories have been published in Star Wars Insider. Some of these were later reprinted in the Paperback Editions of various Novels, or The Fiction Collection Compilations.

Timeline	Title	Author	Release date	Issue#	Note
26 ABY	Relic of Ruin	Greg Keyes	October 2002	#62	
26 ABY	A Perilous Plan	Greg Keyes	November 2002	#63	
26 ABY	Emissary of the Void	Greg Keyes	December 2002	#64	
21 BBY	The Clone Wars: The Pengalan Tradeoff	Aaron Allston	January 2003	#65	
22 BBY	Elusion Illusion	Michael A. Stackpole	March 2003	#66	
8 ABY	The Trouble with Squibs	Troy Denning	April 2003	#67	
22 BBY	Hero of Cartao: Hero's Call	Timothy Zahn	June 2003	#68	
22 BBY	Hero of Cartao: Hero's Rise	Timothy Zahn	July 2003	#69	
22 BBY	Hero of Cartao: Hero's End	Timothy Zahn	September 2003	#70	
22 BBY	League of Spies	Aaron Allston	January 2004	#73	
1 ABY	Pearls in the Sand	Voronica Whitney-Robinson	February 2004	#74	
28 ABY	Or Die Trying	Sean Williams/Shane Dix	April 2004	#75	
22 BBY	Changing Seasons: Guardian of the People	Timothy Zahn	May 2004	#76	
22 BBY	Changing Seasons: People of the Guardian	Timothy Zahn	August 2004	#77	
22 BBY	Death in the Catacombs	Mike W. Barr	November 2004	#79	
22 BBY	Omega Squad: Targets	Karen Traviss	March 2005	#81	
20 BBY	MedStar: Intermezzo	Michael Reaves/Steve Perry	August 2005	#83	
18 BBY	A Two-Edged Sword	Karen Traviss	November 2005	#85	
21 BBY	Odds	Karen Traviss	April 2006	#87	
19 BBY	Ghosts of the Sith	Jude Watson	June 2006	#88	
3667 BBY	The Old Republic: The Third Lession	Paul S. Kemp	March 2011	#124	
41 ABY	First Blood	Christie Golden	April 2011	#125	
5 ABY	Buyer's Market	Timothy Zahn	June 2011	#126	
0 BBY	And Leebo Makes Three	Michael Reaves/Maya Kaathryn Bohnhoff	September 2011	#128	
41 ABY	A Fair Trade	Paul S. Kemp	October 2011	#129	
3 ABY	Vader Adrift	Ryder Windham	November 2011	Special Edition 2012	
67 BBY	The Tenebrous Way	Matthew Stover	December 2011	#130	
17 BBY	The Guns of Kelrodo-Ai	Jason Fry	March 2012	#132	
19 ABY	Hunting the Gorach	Jeff Grubb	May 2012	#133	
44 ABY	Getaway	Christie Golden	June 2012	#134	
44 ABY	Roll of the Dice	Karen Miller	July 2012	#135	
24 BBY	Reputation	Ari Marmell	September 2012	#136	
3640 BBY	The Last Battle of Colonel Jace Malcom	Alexander Freed	October 2012	#137	
0 ABY	Heist	Timothy Zahn	December 2012	#138	
21 BBY	Speaking Silently	Jason Fry	January 2013	#139	
25,793 BBY	Eruption	John Ostrander	April 2013	#141	
45 ABY	Good Hunting	Christie Golden	June 2013	#142	
19 BBY	Incognito	John Jackson Miller	July 2013	#143	
22 BBY	Hondo Ohnaka's Not-So-Big Score	Jason Fry	September 2013	#144	
2BBY-0 BBY	Constant Spirit	Jennifer Heddle	October 2013	#145	
36 BBY	The Syrox Redemption	Joe Schreiber	December 2013	#146	
19 BBY	Hammer	Edward M. Erdelac	January 2014	#147	

==== Tales from series (1995–1999) ====
These books contain short Star Wars stories from several notable science-fiction authors with stories that span different eras.

===== Tales from the Mos Eisley Cantina (July 1995) =====
Edited by Kevin J. Anderson.

===== Tales from Jabba's Palace (1995) =====
Edited by Kevin J. Anderson.

===== Tales of the Bounty Hunters (1996) =====
Edited by Kevin J. Anderson.

===== Tales from the Empire (1997) =====
Edited by Peter Schweighofer.

===== Tales from the New Republic (1999) =====
Edited by Peter Schweighofer and Craig Carey.

==== The Old Republic (2014–2022) ====
Between 2014 and 2022, several Short Stories were published on the Official Website of the Star Wars: The Old Republic MMORPG as tie-ins. They are notable for being among of the last pieces of new Legends Media to be published after the Canon Reboot in 2014.

Timeline	Title	Author	Release date	Note
	Lana Beniko's Journal: Darth Arkous	Sean McKeever		
	Surface Details	Charles Boyd		
	Wanted: Dead and Dismantled			
	Remnants	Charles Boyd		
	Wanted: Dead and Dismantled			
	Bedtime on Concordia	Charles Boyd		
	The Price of Power	Courtney Woods		
	One Night in the Dealer's Den	Courtney Woods		
	The Final Trial	Courtney Woods		
	Regrets	Courtney Woods		
	The Sixth Line	Courtney Woods		
	Vacation	Courtney Woods		
	Brothers	Courtney Woods		
	A Mother's Hope	Drew Karpyshyn		
	Trading Scars: A Short Story on Umbara	Samantha Wallschlaeger		
	Copero	Charles Boyd		
	Quite A Story To Tell	Caitlin Sullivan Kelly		
	Seeing Red	Jay Watamanuik		
	All That's Left	Caitlin Sullivan Kelly		
	Bottled Fury	Jay Watamanuik		
	Snare	Jay Watamanuik		

==== Other ====
Timeline	Title	Author	Release date	Note
	A Grand Admiral returns	Bill Slavicsek	1992-07-01	Published in the Heir to the Empire Sourcebook
	X-Wing: The Farlander Papers	Rusel DeMaria	1993-06-01	Published in the X-Wing: The Official Strategy Guide Sourcebook.
	TIE Fighter: The Stele Chronicles	Rusel DeMaria	1994-07-18	Published in the TIE Fighter: The Official Strategy Guide Sourcebook.
	Crisis of Faith	Timothy Zahn	2011-09-06	Published in the special 20th anniversary edition of Heir to the Empire.

=== Children's books ===
Storybooks published before 2014 for younger readers that are shorter than a standard or young adult novel.

==== Science Adventures (1999) ====
Timeline	Title	Author	Release date	Note
	Emergency in Escape Pod Four	Jude Watson/K.D. Burkett	1999	
	Journey Across Planet X	Jude Watson/K.D. Burkett	1999	

==== The Further Adventures ====
24-page read-along adaptations of the 1977 Star Wars comic by Marvel Comics. They are accompanied by a 7-inch 33 1/3 record or cassette.

Timeline	Title	Adapter	Illustrator	Release date	Note
3 ABY	Droid World	Archie Goodwin	Dick Foes	1983	adaptation of Star Wars #47
3 ABY	Planet of the Hoojibs	David Michelinie	Greg Winters	1983	adaptation of Star Wars #55

==== The Ewoks Join the Fight ====
A partial adaptation of Return of the Jedi as a 32-page read-along book with color illustrations. A read-along version accompanied by a 7-inch 33 1/3 record or cassette was also released in the same year.

Timeline	Title	Adapter	Illustrator	Release date	Note
4 ABY	The Ewoks Join the Fight	Bonnie Bogart	Diane de Groat	1983	

==== Golden Books ====
24-page illustrated children's books by Golden Books

Timeline	Title	Author	Release date	Note
0 BBY	Journey to Mos Eisley	Jay Rudko	1998	
3 ABY	The Hoth Adventure	Jay Rudko	1998	
4 ABY	Escape from Jabba's Palace	Jay Rudko	1998	

== Other ==
Non-canon stories that are not part of the Star Wars Legends branding.

Timeline	Series	Title	Author	Release date	Maturity	Audiobook	Note
196 BBY	Jedi Academy	Jedi Academy	Jeffrey Brown	2013-08-27	YA	No	(Note: Collected in Jedi Academy: Trilogy Box Set)
195 BBY	Jedi Academy	Return of the Padawan	Jeffrey Brown	2014-07-29	YA	No	(Note: Collected in Jedi Academy: Trilogy Box Set)
194 BBY	Jedi Academy	The Phantom Bully	Jeffrey Brown	2015-06-30	YA	No	(Note: Collected in Jedi Academy: Trilogy Box Set)
182 BBY	Jedi Academy	A New Class	Jarrett J. Krosoczka	2016-07-26	YA	No	
181 BBY	Jedi Academy	The Force Oversleeps	Jarrett J. Krosoczka	2017-07-25	YA	No	
180 BBY	Jedi Academy	The Principal Strikes Back	Jarrett J. Krosoczka	2018-07-31	YA	No	
180 BBY	Jedi Academy	Revenge of the Sis	Amy Ignatow	2019-03-26	YA	No	
179 BBY	Jedi Academy	Attack of the Furball	Amy Ignatow	2019-09-03	YA	No	
178 BBY	Jedi Academy	At Last, Jedi	Amy Ignatow	2020-04-21	YA	No	
N/A	Ronin: A Visions Novel		Emma Mieko Candon	2021-10-12	AA	Yes	(Note: Builds on the Star Wars: Visions episode "The Duel")
