= Servants of the Empire =

Science fiction novel series by Jason Fry

- Cover of Edge of the Galaxy
- Edge of the Galaxy (2014); Rebel in the Ranks (2015); Imperial Justice (2015); The Secret Academy (2015)
- Author: Jason Fry
- Country: United States
- Language: English
- Genre: Star Wars; Science fiction
- Publisher: Disney-Lucasfilm Press
- Media type: Print (paperback); E-book
- No. of books: 4

Servants of the Empire is a young reader science fiction novel series by Jason Fry. Set in the Star Wars universe, the novels are affiliated with the television series Star Wars Rebels and follow the Rebels character Zare Leonis.

== Novels ==
- Servants of the Empire: Edge of the Galaxy (October 21, 2014)
- Servants of the Empire: Rebel in the Ranks (March 3, 2015)
- Servants of the Empire: Imperial Justice (July 7, 2015)
- Servants of the Empire: The Secret Academy (October 6, 2015)
