= Twilight Falling =

2003 novel by Paul S. Kemp

- Cover of the first edition
- Author: Paul S. Kemp
- Language: English
- Genre: Fantasy novel
- Published: 2003
- Publication place: United States
- Media type: Print (Paperback)
- ISBN: 978-0-7869-2998-6
- Followed by: Dawn of Night

Twilight Falling is a fantasy novel by Paul S. Kemp, set in the world of the Forgotten Realms, and based on the Dungeons & Dragons role-playing game. It is the first novel in "The Erevis Cale Trilogy". It was published in paperback in July 2003 (ISBN 978-0-7869-2998-6). The Erevis Cale Trilogy was later reprinted as an omnibus in June 2010 (ISBN 978-0-7869-5498-8).

== Plot summary ==
Erevis Cale serves a new master, the deity Mask, after accepting the gift of the Fane of Shadows.

== Reception ==
In a moderately positive review, critic Don D'Ammassa wrote, "There's enough suspense to keep you guessing, and reading, right to the end." The book was also reviewed by Don Bassingthwaite in Black Gate, Fall 2004.

== Reviews ==
Review by Don D'Ammassa (2004) in Chronicle, #243 January 2004
