= Paul S. Kemp =

American novelist

- Education: University of Michigan–Dearborn; University of Michigan Law School
- Occupation: Author
- Spouse: Jennifer
- Writing career
- Genre: Fantasy

Paul S. Kemp is an American fantasy author known for his Forgotten Realms and Star Wars novels.

== Education ==
Kemp is a graduate of the University of Michigan–Dearborn. Kemp is a 2000 graduate of the University of Michigan School of Law.

== Career ==
Some examples of his work include Resurrection, the final installation of War of the Spider Queen series. He is also a strong defender of shared world fiction.

== Personal life ==
Kemp is a Dungeons & Dragons player. He also practices corporate law in Detroit. Kemp lives in Grosse Pointe, Michigan, with his wife Jennifer.

== Bibliography ==
=== The Erevis Cale Trilogy ===
- Twilight Falling (July 2003)
- Dawn of Night (June 2004)
- Midnight's Mask (November 2005)

=== Sembia ===
- Shadow's Witness (November 2000)

=== The Twilight War Trilogy ===
- Shadowbred (November 2006)
- Shadowstorm (August 2007)
- Shadowrealm (2008)

=== War of the Spider Queen ===
- Resurrection (Book VI) (April 2005)

=== Star Wars novels ===
- Crosscurrent (January 26, 2010)
- The Old Republic: Deceived (March 2011)
- Riptide (October 2011)
- Star Wars: Lords of the Sith (April 21, 2015)

=== Egil and Nix ===
- The Hammer and the Blade (June 26, 2012)
- A Discourse in Steel (June 25, 2013)
- A Conversation in Blood (January 24, 2017)

=== The Sundering ===
- The Godborn (2013)

=== Short fiction ===
- Another Name for Dawn (November 2000)
- Too Long in the Dark (A Piece of Realms of Shadow) (April 2002)
- And All the Sinners, Saints (July 2002)
- Cause and Effect (November 2002)
- Soulbound (A Piece of Realms of the Dragon) (August 2004)
- Confession (June 2007)
- Spinner (August 2007)
- Continuum (A Piece of Realms of War) (January 2008)
- Star Wars: The Old Republic: The Third Lesson (March 2011)
