= Dawn of Night =

2004 novel by Paul S. Kemp

- Cover of the first edition
- Author: Paul S. Kemp
- Language: English
- Genre: Fantasy novel
- Published: 2004
- Publication place: United States
- Media type: Print (Paperback)
- ISBN: 978-0-7869-3225-2
- Preceded by: Twilight Falling
- Followed by: Midnight's Mask

Dawn of Night is a fantasy novel by Paul S. Kemp, set in the world of the Forgotten Realms, and based on the Dungeons & Dragons role-playing game. It is the second novel in "The Erevis Cale Trilogy". It was published in paperback in June 2004. The Erevis Cale Trilogy was later reprinted as an omnibus in June 2010 (ISBN 978-0-7869-5498-8).

== Plot summary ==
Erevis Cale has gained more power and taken on more responsibility as a follower of the deity Mask.

== Reception ==
Critic Don D'Ammassa opined that "the story is quite well done, although you won't be particularly surprised by any of the plot twists."
