= Midnight's Mask =

Novel by Paul S. Kemp

- First edition
- Author: Paul S. Kemp
- Cover artist: Ron Spears
- Language: English
- Genre: Fantasy
- Publication place: United States
- Media type: Print (paperback)
- Pages: 312
- ISBN: 0-7869-3643-6
- OCLC: 62208898
- Preceded by: Dawn of Night

Midnight's Mask is a fantasy novel by Paul S. Kemp, set in the world of the Forgotten Realms, and based on the Dungeons & Dragons role-playing game. It is the third novel in "The Erevis Cale Trilogy". It was published in paperback in November 2005 (ISBN 978-0-7869-3643-4). The Erevis Cale Trilogy was later reprinted as an omnibus in June 2010 (ISBN 978-0-7869-5498-8).

== Plot summary ==
Erevis Cale is one of the Chosen of the deity Mask. The novel follows Cale along his path away from his own humanity.

== Reception ==
In a positive review, Don D'Ammassa wrote that the story is "complex", highlighting how the main character "is a man tormented by questions of right and wrong."
