= Star Wars: Scoundrels =

2013 novel by Timothy Zahn

- Author: Timothy Zahn
- Series: Star Wars
- Publisher: Del Rey
- Publication date: December 26, 2012
- Media type: Hardcover
- Pages: 464
- ISBN: 978-0-345-51150-8

Star Wars: Scoundrels is a Star Wars novel written by Timothy Zahn, released by Del Rey Books on December 26, 2012. It is set just after the events of the originating 1977 film Star Wars: A New Hope and features Han Solo, Chewbacca, and Lando Calrissian.

== Plot ==
Soon after the destruction of the Death Star, Han, Chewbacca, and Lando recruit eight others for a high stakes heist. Han still needs credits to pay off his debt, and this is the perfect opportunity.

== Development ==
For Scoundrels, Zahn was inspired by team caper films. He said, "This is the Star Wars version of Ocean's 11. In fact, my original title was Solo's 11, but they decided that might be a little too close to the trademark."

== Reception ==
Wired criticized the excessive number of characters but overall the novel was called "a fun ride" and "easy to enjoy". SFX gave a score of 3 out of 5 and concluded: "Forced nods to the original trilogy, diminishing new content. JJ Abrams, take note." Reactor recommended the book to both the casual readers and Expanded Universe fans. The ending was highlighted as exhilarating. Kirkus Reviews called it "a crisply told Star Wars adventure."
