= Lydia Kang =

American author

- Born: Baltimore, Maryland, United States
- Occupations: Internal medicine physician and novelist
- Writing career
- Language: English
- Period: 2009–present
- Genres: Science fiction; Nonfiction; Star Wars; Young adult; Historical fiction
- Website: lydiakang.com

Lydia Kang is an American author of adult and young adult fiction, poetry, and nonfiction. She is also an internal medicine physician, and practices internal medicine in Omaha, Nebraska. Her most popular works include the 1899-era story Opium & Absinthe (2020), which entailed a story of a young woman from a rich New York family whose sister dies unexpectedly with bite wounds in her neck and sets out on a mission to find the killer, A Beautiful Poison (2017), which is a sequel of Opium & Absinthe, where a series of deaths during the Spanish flu pandemic becomes so spontaneous and close to the main character, Allene, that it prompts suspicion, and her Star Wars novels.

== Life and education ==
Lydia Kang was born in Baltimore, Maryland. She graduated from Roland Park Country School in 1989 and received her BA from Columbia University. She was a research assistant at the Columbia University Department of Biology during her undergraduate years and in graduate school. She received her MD from New York University Grossman School of Medicine in 1998. After completing a primary care internal medicine residency at New York University's Langone Department of Medicine, she served as chief resident from 2001 to 2002 before staying on as an attending physician at Bellevue Hospital. In 2006, she moved to Omaha, Nebraska with her family and is an associate professor in the Division of General Internal Medicine at the University of Nebraska Medical Center.

== Career ==
In 2009, she joined the writing workshop The Seven Doctors Project at the University of Nebraska Medical Center. After writing two novels, she sold her third, a young adult science fiction novel, Control, to Penguin Random House in 2011 which subsequently released in 2013. The sequel, Catalyst, was published in 2015. In 2017, she released three more books, A Beautiful Poison, Quackery: A Brief History of the Worst Ways to Cure Everything (co-written with Nate Pedersen), and The November Girl. The November Girl won a 2018 Nebraska Best Book Award for Young Adult Literature. Quackery was a Science Friday Best Science Book of 2017. Her young adult novel, Toxic, was published in 2018 and was a YARWA Athena Award winner for speculative fiction and a Junior Library Guild selection. She also published three more adult historical fiction novels, including The Impossible Girl in 2018, Opium and Absinthe in 2020, and The Half-Life of Ruby Fielding in 2022.

Her second co-written nonfiction book, Patient Zero: A Curious History of the World's Worst Disease, was published in 2021 and received a starred review from Publishers Weekly. It was the 2022 winner of the Nebraska Book Award in the NonFiction Popular History category.

Her third co-written nonfiction book, Pseudoscience: An Amusing History of Crackpot Ideas and Why We Love Them was published in 2025 and began receiving support from Kang's loyal nonfiction readers. The book explores the history of popular scientific ideas and phenomena that have been disproved by science.

Her writing is included in the young adult anthology, Color Outside the Lines: Stories about Love. Her short story, Right-Hand Man, is included in the 2020 anthology From a Certain Point of View: The Empire Strikes Back, which describes the critical scene in The Empire Strikes Back in which 2-1B attached Luke Skywalker's prosthetic hand. In 2022, StarWars.com announced the addition of Kang to their Phase II multimedia project for the novel, Cataclysm. In 2023, her short story "The Call of Coruscant" was released in Star Wars: The High Republic Tales of Light and Life, a Young Adult anthology.

She has helped other writers with medical accuracy in their fiction. She has also published poetry and essays in JAMA, The Canadian Medical Association Journal, Flatwater Free Press, Journal of General Internal Medicine, The Annals of Internal Medicine, Great Weather for Media, and the Linden Review.

== Works ==
Young Adult Novels

- Control (Dial Books, Penguin Random House, 2013)
- Catalyst (Kathy Dawson Books, Penguin Random House, 2013)
- The November Girl (Entangled Publishing, 2017)
- Toxic (Entangled Publishing, 2018)
- K-Jane (Quill Tree Books, 2025)

Short Stories

- Yuna and the Wall in Color Outside the Lines: Stories about Love (Soho Press, 2019)
- The Right-Hand Man in Star Wars: From a Certain Point of View: The Empire Strikes Back (Random House Worlds, 2020)
- Star Wars: The High Republic - Tales of Light and Life (Disney Lucasfilm Press, 2023)

Adult Novels

- A Beautiful Poison (Lake Union Publishing, 2017)
- The Impossible Girl (Lake Union Publishing, 2018)
- Opium and Absinthe: A Novel (Lake Union Publishing, 2020)
- The Half-Life of Ruby Fielding (Lake Union Publishing, 2022)
- Star Wars: Cataclysm (Del Rey Books, 2023)

Adult Nonfiction

- Quackery: A Brief History of the Worst Ways to Cure Everything (Workman Publishing, 2017)
- Patient Zero (Workman Publishing, 2022)
- Pseudoscience: An Amusing History of Crackpot Ideas and Why We Love Them (Workman Publishing, 2025)
