= Star Wars: Tales From a Galaxy Far, Far Away: Aliens: Volume I =

2016 Star Wars short story anthology

Star Wars: Tales From a Galaxy Far, Far Away
- First edition
- Author: Landry Q. Walker
- Cover artist: Tyler Scarlett
- Language: English
- Series: Star Wars Books, Star Wars Canon, Journey to Star Wars: The Force Awakens
- Genre: Adventure; Science fiction; Action Thriller
- Publisher: Disney Book Group
- Publication date: April 5, 2016
- Publication place: United States
- Pages: 352
- ISBN: 9781484741412
- Followed by: Star Wars: Before the Awakening, by Greg Rucka

Star Wars: Tales From a Galaxy Far, Far Away: Aliens: Volume 1 is a collection of six short stories written by Landry Q. Walker. The stories take place in the Star Wars Universe, set near the events of Star Wars: The Force Awakens. The book was published by Disney Lucasfilm Press in 2016.

== Plot Summaries ==
=== High Noon on Jakku ===
Constable Zuvio, the Constable of Niima Outpost, must get to the bottom of things when a trustworthy droid commits a bank robbery on a banking ship.

=== The Face of Evil ===
Two Frignosian cryptosurgeons on Takodana high in the tower of Maz Kanata's Castle must conduct a plastic surgery on a well-known criminal looking to hide her identity.

=== True Love ===
Two of Unkar Plutt's thugs plan on tricking him into giving them riches by programming a computer to steal his information through a dating site.

=== All Creatures Great and Small ===
Bobbajo the crittermonger tells a story how he was trapped on the Death Star while he and the citizens of Niima Outpost wait out an attack on their town.

=== A Recipe for Death ===
When his sous chef is found dead and his recipe book missing, the head chef at Maz Kanata's Castle must figure out who the culprit is through hosting a cooking contest for his staff.

=== The Crimson Corsair and the Lost Treasure of Count Dooku ===
Pirates, gangs, and bounty hunters all race to find Count Dooku's lost treasure on a desert planet far in the Outer Rim, and everyone will do whatever it takes to get their hands on it.

== Publishing ==
This collection of short stories was published on April 5, 2016, by Disney Lucasfilm Press, an imprint of Disney Book Group. Its hardcover ISBN is 9781484741412.

== Reception ==
- According to Goodreads, the book has a 3.61/5, based on 526 ratings
- Youtini rated this book 7.3/10
- The Barnes & Noble community gave this book 5/5 stars, based on 1 review.
- SanFransicoBookReview.com rated this book 4/5 stars
