= Death Troopers =

Star Wars novel written by Joe Schreiber

- Author: Joe Schreiber
- Cover artist: Indika
- Language: English
- Series: "Virus duology", preceded by Red Harvest
- Genre: Science fiction novel Horror novel
- Publisher: Del Rey Books
- Publication date: October 13, 2009
- Publication place: United States
- Media type: Print (Hardcover & Paperback)
- Pages: 288 (first edition, hardback);
- ISBN: 0-345-50962-5 (first edition, hardback)
- Preceded by: Red Harvest

Death Troopers is a Star Wars novel written by Joe Schreiber. Schreiber's idea was to create a horror story in the Star Wars universe that pulled from horror movies he enjoyed such as The Shining and Alien. The novel is the first Star Wars horror story since the Galaxy of Fear series, released in the late 1990s. Released on October 13, 2009, Death Troopers is set just before the events shown in A New Hope. It was heavily featured in the MMORPG Star Wars Galaxies with SOE confirming a full page of information and advertisements of the game in the book. On September 22, 2010, Ballantine Books revealed the cover of the prequel novel, also by Schreiber, called Red Harvest.

== Plot ==
The Imperial prison barge Purge breaks down in a distant, uninhabited part of space. Its only hope appears to lie with the Star Destroyer Vector, drifting nearby, derelict and seemingly abandoned. When a boarding party from the Purge is sent to scavenge for parts, only half of them come back, bringing with them a contagion so lethal that within hours, almost all aboard the Purge are dead – the half-dozen survivors include two teenage brothers, Kale and Trig Longo, the ruthless captain of the guards, Jareth Sartoris, and chief medical officer, Zahara Cody, all of whom seem to possess natural immunity.

The Purge's onboard computer informs Cody that there are also two survivors in isolation, and Cody leaves the medibay to release them and administer an antidote synthesized from her blood by the incumbent 21B medical droid "Waste". The isolated prisoners are Han Solo and Chewbacca who initially are skeptical of the situation, but allow her to immunize them, and make their way back to medical. Upon returning to medical they find it empty, and Waste destroyed. The dead have become undead and begin to hunt the survivors who are forced to abandon Purge and take shelter in the Vector, unaware that the Destroyer is not the better place to be.

All the survivors are separated: Sartoris faces the few living survivors who have become cannibalistic, and are hiding in an Imperial Assault shuttle previously captured by the Vector tractor beam. Solo and Chewbacca make their way to the bridge in an attempt to either fly the Vector, or at least turn off the tractor beam. Kale dies from an infected wound, returns to life as a zombie, and is subsequently killed again by Trig. Cody finds herself in the Vector medbay, and with the aid of the Destroyer's own 21B discovers the cause of the contagion: Codenamed Blackwing, it is an artificially created virus – intended to slow the onset of decay and rigor mortis, and increase the healing capacity of the human body prior to death. The Vector was taking it to an isolated outpost for testing. However, the contagion – characterised by a grey goo – leaked from its containers and infected the ship, converting its 8,000 crew into the undead. Cody observes from her vantage point that the remaining ships in the docking bay are being filled with the zombies, who are attempting to leave the Vector and spread their contagion throughout the galaxy.

After escaping from the shuttle, Sartoris meets up with Solo, Chewbacca and Trig, then sacrifices himself to allow them to escape, after revealing he has been bitten by an undead and is himself turning into a zombie. They return to the shuttle and successfully leave the Vector, but discover that a zombie has made it aboard the shuttle and killed the two remaining original survivors. The zombie is shot by Cody – who they had previously thought killed when the shuttle ready room she was hiding in was destroyed by the zombies – and she points out that the rest of the escaped ships are no longer controlled, as they watch two infested TIE fighters collide with each other and explode. Cody theorises that Blackwing is only effective when in range of the original contagion source on the Destroyer, and that now removed from the source the zombies have again "died".

The four survivors leave the Vector and the now-derelict ships, and find a planet where they sell the shuttle to a pirate group. Solo and Chewbacca leave to re-buy their impounded ship, while Cody and Trig use their share of the sale to visit a distant planet – home to one of the dead prison guards, and deliver a note he was in the process of writing when Blackwing took him.

== Reception ==
Critical reception has been mixed to positive.

- The book got an 8/10 from Fantasy Book Reviews

== Adaptations ==
In 2009, an update to Star Wars Galaxies was released called "Death Troopers", based on the novel. In 2012, the Blackwing virus from the novel would be added to the Disney Star Wars canon when it was added to the game Star Wars Commander.

In 2024, Stephano Cagani created a fan game based on the novel and released it on Itch.io.

== See also ==
- Galaxy of Fear
