= Joe Schreiber =

American novelist (born 1969)

- Born: 1969 (age 56–57)
- Occupations: Writer, MRI technician
- Known for: Death Troopers, Chasing the Dead, Perry & Gobi Series

Joe Schreiber (born 1969) is an American novelist known for his horror and thriller novels.

== Bibliography ==
- Chasing the Dead (2006, adapted into comic format in 2012)
- Eat the Dark (2007)
- No Windows, No Doors (2009)
- Supernatural: The Unholy Cause (2010)
- Lenny Cyrus, School Virus (2013)
- Game Over, Pete Watson (2014)
- Con Academy (2015)
- She's Dating The Gangster (2014)

=== Star Wars ===
1. Death Troopers (2009)
2. Red Harvest (2011)
3. Maul: Lockdown (2014)
4. Solo: A Star Wars Story: A Junior Novel (2018)
5. The Mandalorian Junior Novel (2021)
6. The Mandalorian Season 2 Junior Novel (2022)
7. The Book of Boba Fett Junior Novel (2023)

=== Perry & Gobi ===
1. Au Revoir, Crazy European Chick (2011 - later re-titled Pretty Deadly for a 2014 re-release)
2. Perry's Killer Playlist (2012 - later re-titled Pretty Lethal for a 2015 re-release)

== Personal life ==
As of 2014, Schreiber also worked as an MRI technician in Pennsylvania.
