= Star Wars: Lords of the Sith =

Star Wars novel by Paul S. Kemp

- Author: Paul S. Kemp
- Cover artist: Aaron McBride
- Language: English
- Series: Star Wars
- Genre: Science fiction
- Publisher: Del Rey Books
- Publication date: April 28, 2015
- Publication place: United States
- Media type: Print (Hardcover)
- Pages: 320 (First edition, hardcover)
- ISBN: 978-0-345-51144-7 (First edition, hardcover)

Star Wars: Lords of the Sith is a Star Wars novel by Paul S. Kemp, published in April 2015. Set between the film Revenge of the Sith and the novel Star Wars: Tarkin, as well as the TV show Star Wars Rebels, it features Darth Vader and Emperor Palpatine facing off against revolutionaries, led by Rebel Alliance Partisan Cham Syndulla. Lords of the Sith was one of the first four novels published in the franchise after Lucasfilm redefined Star Wars continuity in April 2014.

== Overview ==
In Lords of the Sith, Vader and Palpatine find themselves hunted by revolutionaries on the Twi'lek planet Ryloth.

== Publication ==
With the 2012 acquisition of Lucasfilm by The Walt Disney Company, most of the licensed Star Wars novels and comics produced since the originating 1977 film Star Wars were rebranded as Star Wars Legends and declared non-canon to the franchise in April 2014. Lords of the Sith was subsequently announced as one of the first four canon novels to be released in 2014 and 2015.

== Impact ==
Lords of the Sith introduces Moff Delian Mors, a lesbian whom New York Daily News noted is the first openly lesbian character in the new Star Wars canon.

== Reception ==
IGN gave a score 8.5 out of 10, and called it a well done novel with a rushed ending. Den of Geek said the novel "will likely be a satisfying read for fans of Vader and Palpatine."
