= Jason Fry =

American author, editor, digital consultant and online contributor

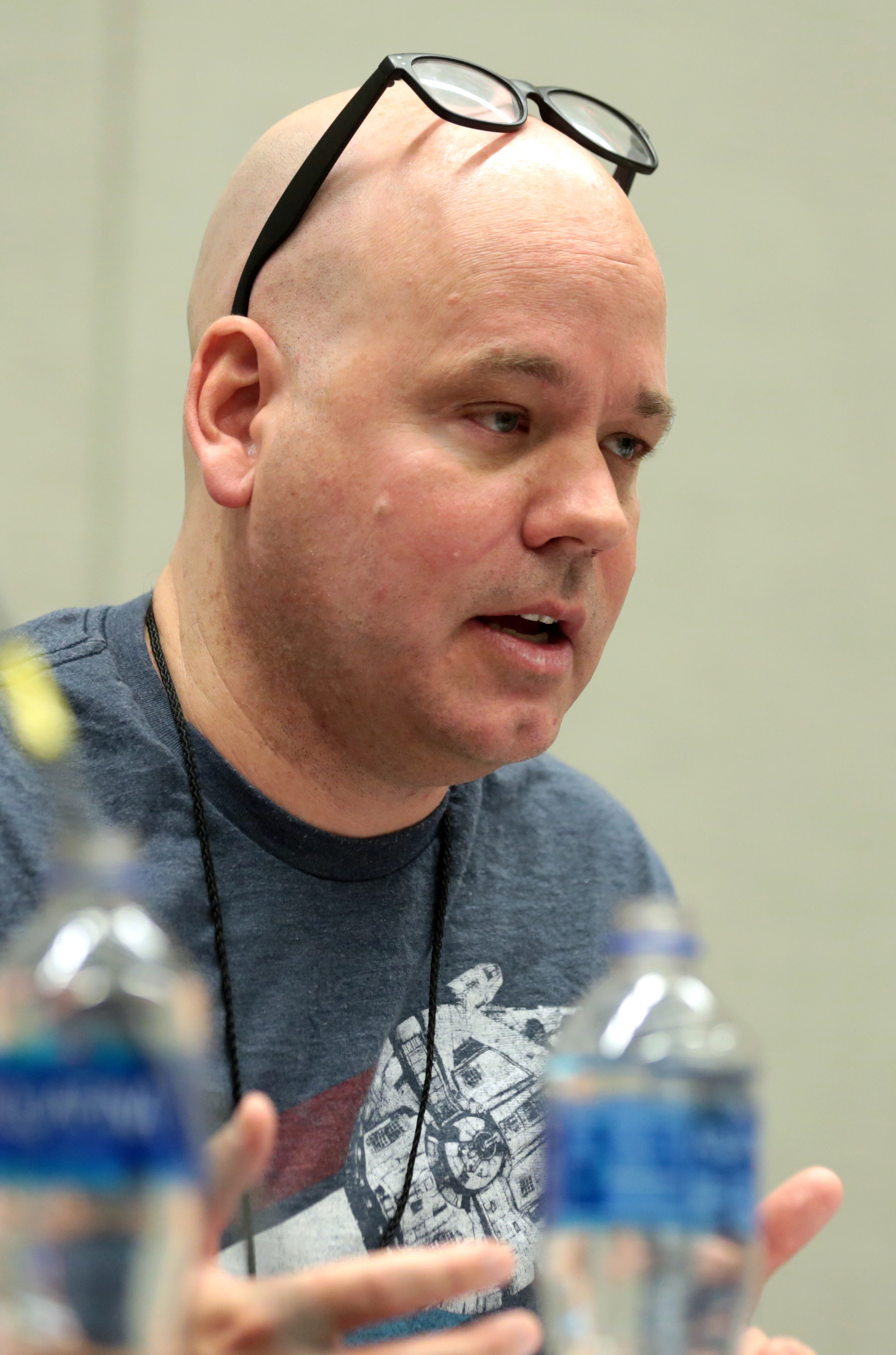
- Fry at the 2018 Phoenix Comic Fest
- Born: 1969 (age 56–57)

Jason C. Fry (born 1969) is an American author, editor, digital consultant and online contributor. His written works include the novelization of Star Wars: The Last Jedi, as well as about a dozen other books and short stories from the Star Wars universe. Fry is also the author of The Jupiter Pirates, a young adult space fantasy saga. He currently resides in Brooklyn, New York.

== Early life ==
Fry was born in Charlottesville, Virginia in 1969 and grew up on Long Island. He graduated from Yale University with a degree in American studies.

== Early career ==
Fry worked at The Wall Street Journal for 13 years. In 2008, he went on to work as a digital media consultant for a maker of publishing software, before becoming an independent writer in 2009.

== Writing career ==
Fry first wrote for Star Wars in 1999, publishing a column on Vector Prime. He then went on to write the Star Wars: The Clone Wars: The Visual Guide, which was published in 2008, and several other Star Wars books. He also wrote Star Wars: The Last Jedi (Expanded Edition), the novelization of the 2017 movie Star Wars: The Last Jedi.

Fry's other works include The Jupiter Pirates, a book series about a family of space pirates, in which only one child can become the captain. Three books have been published, with two more still being written. According to Fry, The Jupiter Pirates was partially inspired by Star Wars.

He also written one Minecraft novel. Minecraft: The Voyage is about a young man named Stax Stonecutter, who doesn't like to go exploring, and gets his home invaded one morning. Stax soon found that being away from home gives him the chance to find his curiosity and freedom, as he found some friends along the way.
